= 2020 St Kilda Football Club season =

St Kilda Football Club
2020 season
- President: Matt Finnis
- Coach: Brett Ratten (2nd season)
- Captain: Jarryn Geary (4th season)
- Home grounds: Docklands Stadium (Capacity: 53,347)
- Pre-Season: 2-0
- AFL season: 6th (10–7)
- Finals Series: 5th (semi finalists)
- Trevor Barker Award: Jack Steele
- Leading goalkicker: Dan Butler (27)
- Club membership: 48,588

The 2020 St Kilda Football Club season was the 124th in the club's history. Coached by Brett Ratten and captained by Jarryn Geary, they competed in the AFL's 2020 Toyota Premiership Season.

== 2019 off-season list changes ==
=== Retirements and delistings ===
Player	Reason	Career games	Career goals	Ref
David Armitage	Retired	169	98	
Billy Longer	Retired	66 (57 St Kilda, 9 Brisbane)	4	
Lewis Pierce	Delisted	5	1	
Sam Rowe	Delisted	100 (1 St Kilda, 99 Carlton)	17	
Bailey Rice	Delisted	11	-	
Brandon White	Delisted	11	1	
Robbie Young	Delisted	3	2	
Jack Newnes	Delisted	155	55	
Paddy McCartin	Delisted	35	34	

=== Trades ===
The Saints began the 2019 trade period with a significant amount of work to do, following at least four players requesting to join the club. Bradley Hill (Fremantle), Paddy Ryder (Port Adelaide), Dougal Howard (Port Adelaide) and Zak Jones (Sydney) all told their respective clubs of their desire to be traded to the Saints at the end of the 2019 season. The Saints also discussed at trading out four-time best and fairest winner Jack Steven, widely rumoured to desire a move to Geelong for personal reasons, while many in the media reported that Josh Bruce was interested in a trade to the Western Bulldogs. Richmond's Dan Butler and Port Adelaide's Sam Gray have also expressed interest in being traded to the Saints.

The Saints began the trade period holding picks 6, 59, 76 and 82.

Date	Gained	Lost	Trade partner	Ref
10 October 2019	Picks 12 and 18	Picks 6 (On-traded to Adelaide, Fischer McAsey) and 59 (Thomas Hutchesson)	Greater Western Sydney	
15 October 2019	Dougal Howard Paddy Ryder Pick 10 2020 4th round pick	Picks 12 (Miles Bergman), 18 (Mitch Georgiades) 2020 3rd round pick	Port Adelaide	
16 October 2019	Pick 58	Jack Steven	Geelong	
16 October 2019	Bradley Hill; 2020 3rd round pick	Picks 10 (on-traded to Melbourne, Kysaiah Pickett), 58 2020 2nd and 4th round picks Blake Acres	Fremantle	
16 October 2019	Picks 32 and 51 (Ryan Byrnes)	Josh Bruce	Western Bulldogs	
16 October 2019	Zak Jones Pick 56 2020 4th round pick	Pick 32 (Elijah Taylor) 2020 3rd round pick	Sydney Swans	
16 October 2019	Dan Butler	Pick 56 (Bigoa Nyuon)	Richmond	

=== Free agents ===
On 22 November 2019, the Saints acquired former Geelong ruckman Ryan Abbott as a delisted free-agent.

=== Draft ===
At the 2019 National Draft on 28 November 2019, the Saints selected Ryan Byrnes (pick 52) and Leo Connolly (Pick 64). At the 2019 Rookie Draft St Kilda used pick five to draft Jack Bell.

=== 2020 squad change summary ===
In:

Player	Reason
Bradley Hill	Trade
Dougal Howard	Trade
Paddy Ryder	Trade
Zak Jones	Trade
Dan Butler	Trade
Ryan Abbott	Free Agent
Ryan Byrnes	Draft
Leo Connolly	Draft
Jack Bell	Rookie Draft

Out:

Player	Reason
David Armitage	Retired
Billy Longer	Retired
Lewis Pierce	Delisted
Sam Rowe	Delisted
Josh Bruce	Trade
Jack Steven	Trade
Blake Acres	Trade
Bailey Rice	Delisted
Brandon White	Delisted
Robbie Young	Delisted
Jack Newnes	Delisted
Paddy McCartin	Delisted

== Pre-season ==
The Saints secured the opportunity to hold opening game of the pre-season Marsh Community Series by hosting the first senior game in more than 25 years at their spiritual home of Moorabbin Oval (currently known as RSEA Park due to naming sponsorship). The Saints' played a practice game a week later, also again the Hawks. The Saints' second pre-season series game saw the team travel to the regional town of Morwell in the La Trobe Valley of East Gippsland in south-eastern Victoria.

**Rd**	**Date and local time**	**Opponent**	**Scores** (St Kilda's scores indicated in **bold**)			**Venue**	**Attendance**
**Rd**	**Date and local time**	**Opponent**	Home	Away	Result	**Venue**	**Attendance**
1	Thursday 20 February, 7.10 pm	Hawthorn	**17.9 (111)**	13.12 (90)	Won by 21 points	RSEA Park (H)	8,187
Practice	Friday 28 February, 4.30 pm	Hawthorn	11.8 (74)	**6.12 (48)**	Lost by 26 points	Morwell (A)	3,000
2	Sunday 8 March, 3.50 pm	Collingwood	9.3 (57)	**10.8 (68)**	Won by 11 points	Morwell (A)	5,341

== Regular season ==
The Saints were scheduled to play a match in Shanghai in June against Port Adelaide, however, ahead of the 2020 season the AFL announced that the game had been moved to Melbourne due to the COVID-19 pandemic. The fixture change will see the Saints play the Power at Docklands Stadium in Round 12 on 7 June, as opposed to in Shanghai in Round 11. As the coronavirus situation deteriorated in early March, the AFL determined that no spectators would be permitted to attend games until further notice. On 22 March, at the conclusion of Round 1, the AFL determined to suspend the remainder season until further notice due to the coronavirus situation. In mid-May, the AFL announced that the resumption of the 2020 season would begin on 11 June, with non-contact training to be permitted from the 18th and contact training to be permissible from 25 May.

Due to the COVID-19 pandemic, the AFL announced that the 2020 fixture would be reduced from 23 rounds to 17. The first five rounds of the revised 2020 AFL fixture were announced by the AFL on 25 May. Due to COVID-19, players are required to follow strict guidelines and avoid contact with the wider public as part of the conditions set by the government and AFL to allow resumption of the competition. Rounds six and seven are expected to be announced following the conclusion of Round three. On 29 June the AFL announced that the Saints' round 5 game with Carlton was rescheduled from Saturday 4th (at the MCG) to Thursday 2 June (at Docklands). This was due to additional restrictions being placed on Victorian teams flying to Queensland following a spike in Coronavirus cases in Victoria in late June, resulting in the need to again adjust the fixture. On 3 July the AFL announced a significant fixture change along with a relocation of the Saints to a 'hub' in the Queensland region of Noosa, possibly for the remainder of the season. This was due to a deteriorating COVID-19 situation in Victoria. The Saints' revised round six and seven fixtures (against Geelong at the Docklands on the 9th and Port Adelaide on the 19th also at Docklands) were replaced with matches against Fremantle and Adelaide in Queensland and South Australia respectively. The change in fixture coincided with the relocation of all 10 Victorian teams to 'hubs' in Sydney and south-east Queensland. Due to the status of the Saints of a relatively young side, with few players having spouses or children, it was theorised that the temporary relocation would give them an edge over older sides, whose players had been demoralised as a result of having to leave their families behind In order to continue playing. On Monday 13 July, the AFL announced the Round 8 fixture. On 24 July the Saints announced that veteran defender Nathan Brown would leave the team's Queensland hub to return to Melbourne for family reasons. Brown's decision was fully supported by the club with Simon Lethlean saying that "he is such a respected member of our team and the spiritual leader of the connection, culture and standards that we are building here at the Saints. The players and staff love the big fella and we will miss him – but he has made the right call for him and his family, and we are very proud of him for that."

=== Ladder ===
Pos	Team	Pld	W	L	D	PF	PA	PP	Pts	Qualification
1	Port Adelaide	17	14	3	0	1185	869	136.4	56	Finals series
2	Brisbane Lions	17	14	3	0	1184	948	124.9	56	Finals series
3	Richmond (P)	17	12	4	1	1135	874	129.9	50	Finals series
4	Geelong	17	12	5	0	1233	901	136.8	48	Finals series
5	West Coast	17	12	5	0	1095	936	117.0	48	Finals series
**6**	St Kilda	**17**	**10**	**7**	**0**	**1159**	**997**	**116.2**	40	Finals series
7	Western Bulldogs	17	10	7	0	1103	1034	106.7	40	Finals series
8	Collingwood	17	9	7	1	965	881	109.5	38	Finals series
9	Melbourne	17	9	8	0	1063	986	107.8	36	
10	Greater Western Sydney	17	8	9	0	1007	1053	95.6	32	
11	Carlton	17	7	10	0	1017	1078	94.3	28	
12	Fremantle	17	7	10	0	866	924	93.7	28	
13	Essendon	17	6	10	1	938	1185	79.2	26	
14	Gold Coast	17	5	11	1	996	1099	90.6	22	
15	Hawthorn	17	5	12	0	1004	1194	84.1	20	
16	Sydney	17	5	12	0	890	1077	82.6	20	
17	North Melbourne	17	3	14	0	858	1205	71.2	12	
18	Adelaide	17	3	14	0	826	1283	64.4	12	

Source: AFL
Rules for classification: 1) points; 2) percentage; 3) number of points for.
(P) Premiers

=== Revised 2020 AFL fixture ===
- Fixture as at 14 August 2020

**Rd**	**Date and local time**	**Opponent**	**Scores** (St Kilda's scores indicated in **bold**)			**Venue**	**Attendance**	**Ladder**
**Rd**	**Date and local time**	**Opponent**	Home	Away	Result	**Venue**	**Attendance**	**Ladder**
1	Sunday 22 March, 1.10pm	North Melbourne	8.8 (56)	**7.12 (54)**	Lost by 2 points	Marvel Stadium (A)	0^{a}	10th
2	Sunday 14 June, 6.05 pm	Western Bulldogs	**14.4 (88)**	7.7 (49)	Won by 39 points	Marvel Stadium (H)	0^{a}	6th
3	Saturday 20 June, 4.35 pm	Collingwood	12.9 (81)	**5.7 (37)**	Lost by 44 points	MCG (A)	0^{a}	11th
4	Saturday 27 June, 4.35 pm	Richmond	**15.3 (93)**	10.7 (67)	Won by 26 points	Marvel Stadium (H)	0^{a}	7th
5	Thursday 2 July, 7.40 pm	Carlton	8.7 (55)	**11.7 (73)**	Won by 18 points	Marvel Stadium (A)	0^{a}	4th
6	Saturday 11 July, 12.35pm	Fremantle	12.7 (79)	**11.7 (73)**	Lost by 6 points	Carrara (A)	638	7th
7	Monday 20 July, 7.10pm	Adelaide	8.7 (55)	**12.6 (78)**	Won by 23 points	Adelaide Oval (A)	18,173	6th
8	Saturday 25 July, 7.10pm	Port Adelaide	6.8 (44)	**12.1 (73)**	Won by 29 points	Adelaide Oval (A)	16,727	4th
9	Saturday 1 August, 5.10pm	Sydney	**15.11 (101)**	6.12 (48)	Won by 53 points	Gabba (H)	2,978	3rd
10	Thursday 6 August, 8.10pm	Gold Coast	11.8 (74)	**12.6 (78)**	Won by 4 points	Carrara (A)	3,095	2nd
11	Monday 10 August, 6.10pm	Geelong	14.9 (93)	**4.10 (34)**	Lost by 59 points	Gabba (A)	3,903	5th
12	Sunday 16 August, 3.35pm	Essendon	**10.8 (68)**	5.3 (33)	Won by 35 points	Gabba (H)	4,686	5th
13	Sunday 23 August, 3.35pm	Brisbane Lions	6.14 (50)	**7.6 (48)**	Lost by 2 points	Gabba (A)	13,750	6th
14	Saturday 29 August, 7.40pm	Melbourne	8.4 (52)	**7.7 (49)**	Lost by 3 points	Traeger Park (A)	1,917	7th
15	**Bye Round**							7th
16	Saturday 6 September, 1.05pm	Hawthorn	**11.14 (80)**	9.12 (66)	Won by 14 points	Carrara (H)	2,740	6th
17	Thursday 10 September, 7.10pm	West Coast	**6.14 (50)**	9.11 (65)	Lost by 15 points	Gabba (H)	1,925	7th
18	Friday 18 September, 7.50pm	Greater Western Sydney	**12.10 (82)**	3.12 (30)	Won by 52 points	Gabba (H)	1,528	6th

Notes: ^{a}From round 1 to round 5, all matches were played behind closed doors due to the COVID-19 pandemic.

=== Original AFL fixture (pre-COVID-19) ===
Round	Date and local time	Opponent	Venue
1	Sunday 22 March, 1.10 pm	North Melbourne	Docklands (A)
2	Sunday 29 March, 3.20 pm	West Coast	Docklands (H)
3	Sunday 5 April, 3.20 pm	Richmond	Docklands (H)
4	Sunday 12 April, 3.20 pm	Melbourne	Docklands (H)
5	Sunday 19 April, 4.40 pm	Geelong	Kardinia Park (A)
6	Sunday 26 April, 4.40 pm	Adelaide	Docklands (H)
7	Friday 1 May, 7.50 pm	Collingwood	Docklands (A)
8	Saturday 9 May, 7.25 pm	Carlton	Docklands (H)
9	Saturday 16 May, 4.35 pm	GWS	Giants Stadium (A)
10	Saturday 23 May, 1.45 pm	Fremantle	Docklands (H)
11	Bye		
12	Sunday 7 June, 5.40 pm	Port Adelaide	Docklands (H)
13	Sunday 13 June, 4.05 pm	Gold Coast	TIO (A)
14	Sunday 20 June, 1.45 pm	Essendon	Docklands (A)
15	Sunday 28 June, 3.20 pm	Sydney	Docklands (H)
16	Saturday 4 July, 7.10 pm	Adelaide	Adelaide Oval (A)
17	Saturday 11 July, 1.45 pm	Melbourne	MCG (A)
18	Saturday 18 July, 7.25 pm	Western Bulldogs	Docklands (H)
19	Sunday 26 July, 3.20 pm	Brisbane	Gabba (A)
20	Saturday 1 August, 7.25 pm	Hawthorn	Docklands (H)
21	Saturday 8 August, 6.10 pm	Fremantle	Optus Stadium (A)
22	Saturday 16 August, 1.10 pm	Geelong	Docklands (H)
23	Saturday 22 August, TBC	Carlton	Docklands (A)

== 2020 Finals Series ==
The Saints qualified for finals having finished the regular season in 6th place on the premiership ladder. The ladder position also allowed the Saints to 'host' the Second Elimination Final, with the Saints negotiating to play at the Gabba despite reports of a league desire to play the game at the Adelaide Oval. "We have played a lot footy at the Gabba this season and, given where we are currently based in Noosa, it was certainly our preference. Saying that, we were prepared to play wherever the game was fixtured and I know internally with the discussions I have had with players and coaches, that was certainly the mindset of the group," CEO Matt Finnis stated. Teams who finish the regular season in positions five to eight on the ladder compete in a 'sudden death' elimination final. The Saints won the Second Elimination Final against the Western Bulldogs, qualifying for a Semi-final place. Although kicking 2 goals, tapping 20 hit-outs and being involved in seven scoring attempts in a best-on-ground performance, Paddy Ryder injured his hamstring in the dying minutes of the game; the injury was deemed severe enough to rule Ryder out for the remainder of the year in a serious blow for the Saints. The Saints will face Richmond in the semi-final after the Tigers lost to Brisbane in their Qualifying Final. As Richmond finished in third place on the ladder, the Tigers had the right to select the Queensland-based venue for their 'home' final and chose Carrara Stadium on the Gold Coast. Defender Jake Carlisle left the Saints' quarantine hub on 5 October to be present for the birth of his third child. Carlisle had been one of his side's best players in the win over the Bulldogs. Of Carlisle's departure (which will rule him out for he remainder of the season), Chief Operating Officer Simon Lethlean said the club was fully supportive of the decision: "we thank Jake for staying as long as he possibly could before heading to NSW to be with Mel for the birth. He has been away from his young family for a number of months now and we thank him for making that sacrifice. We support him in this decision and wish Jake, Mel, Nash and Layker all the best in the coming weeks." Following the win against the Western Bulldogs, defender Ben Long was charged with 'Engaging in Rough Conduct' against the Bulldogs' Jack Macrae by the Match Review Panel who assessed the incident as Careless Conduct, Medium Impact and High Contact and was offered a one match suspension. The Saints appealed the ruling, however, it was upheld by the AFL Tribunal. The Saints appealed again to the AFL Appeals Board, however despite a two-hour hearing and 30-minute deliberation this also failed with Long ultimately handed a one-match sanction. As a result of the three forced changes, Shane Savage, Josh Battle and Jonathan Marsh were added to the squad for the semi-final against Richmond. The Saints were ultimately defeated by Richmond by 31-points who dominated scores from stoppages and centre clearances, normally not a trait of 2019 premiers.

**Final**	**Date and local time**	**Opponent**	**Scores** (St Kilda's scores indicated in **bold**)			**Venue**	**Attendance**
**Final**	**Date and local time**	**Opponent**	Home	Away	Result	**Venue**	**Attendance**
Second Elimination	Saturday 3 October, 4.40pm	Western Bulldogs	**10.7 (67)**	9.10 (64)	Won by 3 points	Gabba (H)	10,651
Semi-final	Friday 9 October, 6.50pm	Richmond	12.8 (80)	**6.13 (49)**	Lost by 31 points	Cararra (A)	13,788

Qualifying and elimination finals
1 Oct, Adelaide Oval
1	Port Adelaide	9.4 (58)
4	Geelong	5.12 (42)
3 Oct, Optus Stadium
5	West Coast	11.9 (75)
8	Collingwood	12.4 (76)
3 Oct, Gabba
6	**St Kilda**	10.7 (67)
7	Western Bulldogs	9.10 (64)
2 Oct, Gabba
2	Brisbane Lions	10.9 (69)
3	Richmond	8.6 (54)

Semi-finals
10 Oct, Gabba
Geelong	15.10 (100)
Collingwood	5.2 (32)
9 Oct, Metricon Stadium
Richmond	12.8 (80)
**St Kilda**	6.13 (49)

Preliminary finals
16 Oct, Adelaide Oval
Port Adelaide	6.4 (40)
Richmond	6.10 (46)
17 Oct, Gabba
Brisbane Lions	6.6 (42)
Geelong	11.16 (82)

Grand final
24 Oct, Gabba
Richmond	12.9 (81)
Geelong	7.8 (50)

== Post-Season Awards and Accolades ==
Hunter Clark (half back), Nick Coffield (interchange) and Max King (full forward) were selected for the AFL Players' Association 22Under22 side which recognises the best players aged 22 and under throughout the course of the season. Coffield took a team-high 100 marks from his 16 games, completing the season as one of only five players – and the youngest – to make 100. Coffield topped St Kilda's total intercepts (86) and intercept marks (34), finished equal-second for rebound-50s (47) alongside Dougal Howard and overall second for effective disposals (202). Clark finished top-three for his side's disposals (274) and ground-ball gets (85) and was also voted in over 80 per cent of the total fan-submitted 22Under22 teams. King finished runner-up in the Saints’ goalkicking (20) and outright first for marks inside-50 (26) and earned a Rising Star nomination in round 12 against Essendon. Jack Steele finished equal third (with Melbourne's Christian Petracca) in the Brownlow Medal after polling votes in nine games and earning best on ground in the matches against Carlton, Adelaide, Port Adelaide and Gold Coast.

2020 Season Awards
Recipient	Award	Presented By	Notes	Ref
Jack Steele	Trevor Barker Award	St Kilda Football Club	Club Best and Fairest	
Tim Membrey	Robert Harvey Best Clubman	St Kilda Football Club	For team-first approach and leadership	
Nick Coffield	Best Emerging Player	St Kilda Football Club		
Max King	Rising Star (Nomination)	AFL (NAB Rising Star Award)	For performance in Round 12 (three goals)	
Hunter Clark	22Under22	AFL Players' Association	Half-Back	
Nick Coffield	22Under22	AFL Players' Association	Interchange	
Max King	22Under22	AFL Players' Association	Full forward	
Jack Steele	All Australian	AFL	Interchange	
Dan Butler	All Australian (40-man Preliminary Squad)	AFL	Not selected for final 22-man squad	

St Kilda 2020 Brownlow Medal Tally
Player	Votes	Notes
Jack Steele	20	Equal third
Dan Butler	9	
Rowan Marshall	8	
Zak Jones	7	
Jade Gresham	5	
Jack Billings	2	
Bradley Hill	2	
Nicholas Hind	2	
Ben Long	2	
Jake Carlisle	1	
Luke Dunstan	1	
Seb Ross	1	
Paddy Ryder	1	

== Players and staff ==
St Kilda Football Club
Senior list		Rookie list	Coaching staff
1 Nick Coffield; 2 Jake Carlisle; 3 Zak Jones; 4 Jade Gresham; 5 Shane Savage; 6 Sebastian Ross (vc); 7 Luke Dunstan; 8 Bradley Hill; 9 Jack Steele; 10 Dan Hannebery; 11 Hunter Clark; 12 Max King; 13 Jack Lonie; 14 Jarryn Geary (c); 15 Jack Billings; 16 Dan Butler; 17 Dylan Roberton; 18 Paddy Ryder; 19 Rowan Marshall; 20 Dougal Howard	21 Ben Long; 22 Nathan Brown; 23 Jack Bytel; 24 Logan Austin; 25 Dean Kent; 26 Josh Battle; 27 Ryan Abbott; 28 Tim Membrey; 29 Jimmy Webster; 30 Ed Phillips; 31 Ryan Byrnes; 33 Ben Paton; 34 Matthew Parker; 35 Jack Sinclair; 36 Daniel McKenzie; 37 Leo Connolly; 38 Oscar Clavarino; 39 Darragh Joyce; 40 Nick Hind	42 Jack Bell; 43 Jonathon Marsh; 44 Callum Wilkie; 45 Sam Alabakis (B); 46 Doulton Langlands; 48 Jack Mayo	Head coach: Brett Ratten; Assistant coaches: Brendon Lade (forwards/team offense); Aaron Hamill (backline/team defense); Adam Skrobalak (midfield/contest); Robbie Chancellor (stoppages & structures/development); Ben McGlynn (VFL coach/development manager); Jake Batchelor (development); David Rath (head of football program); Billy Slater (leadership and development program); Jarryd Roughead (football operations assistant); Ben Robbins (Head of Mental Health and Well Being); Sean Dempster (assistant); Legend: (c) Captain(s); (vc) Vice-captain(s); (B) Category B rookie; italics - Inactive player list; Long-term injury; (ret.) Retired; Updated: 1 November 2026; Source(s): Playing list, Coaching staff

== Notes ==
Key

- H Home match.
- A Away match.

Notes

- **^{a}** Collingwood's scores are indicated in **bold** font.
