= 2019 St Kilda Football Club season =

St Kilda Football Club
2019 season
- President: Matt Finnis
- Coach: Alan Richardson (6th season)
- Captain: Jarryn Geary (3rd season)
- Home ground: Marvel Stadium (Capacity: 53,347)
- AFL season: 14th
- Leading goalkicker: Tim Membrey(44 goals)
- Club membership: 43,038

The 2019 St Kilda Football Club season was the 123rd in the club's history. Coached by Alan Richardson and captained by Jarryn Geary, they competed in the AFL's 2019 Toyota Premiership Season.

== 2018 off-season list changes ==
=== Retirements and delistings ===
Player	Reason	Career games	Career goals	Ref
Koby Stevens	Retired	91	40	
Ray Connellan	Delisted	0	0	
Hugh Goddard	Delisted	10	1	
Nathan Wright	Delisted	35	9	
Nathan Freeman	Delisted	2	1	
Sam Gilbert	Delisted	208	38	
Darren Minchington	Delisted	28	22	
Maverick Weller	Delisted	121	58	

=== Trades ===
Date	Gained	Lost	Trade partner	Ref
10 October	Pick 39	Tom Hickey	West Coast	
10 October	Pick 39	Pick 60	West Coast	
10 October	2019 4th round pick	2019 4th round pick	West Coast	
12 October	Dan Hannebery	Pick 39	Sydney	
12 October	Pick 28	2019 2nd round pick	Sydney	
12 October	Dean Kent	Pick 65	Melbourne	
17 October	Pick 46	Pick 28	Melbourne	
17 October	Pick 36		Melbourne	

=== National draft ===
Round	Overall pick	Player	Team from	League from	Ref
1	4	Max King	Sandringham Dragons	TAC Cup	
2	41	Jack Bytel	Calder Cannons	TAC Cup	
3	47	Matthew Parker	South Fremantle	WAFL	
3	54	Nick Hind	Essendon	VFL	
4	67	Robbie Young	North Adelaide	SANFL	

=== Rookie draft ===
Round	Overall pick	Player	Team from	League from	Ref
1	3	Callum Wilkie	North Adelaide	SANFL	

=== Pre-season supplemental selection period ===
Date	Player	Team from	League from	Ref
14 March 2019	Jonathon Marsh	East Fremantle	WAFL	
15 March 2019	Sam Rowe	Carlton	AFL	

=== Mid-season draft ===
Round	Overall pick	Player	Team from	League from	Ref
1	8	Jack Mayo	Subiaco	WAFL	

== Squad ==
St Kilda Football Club
Senior list		Rookie list	Coaching staff
1 Nick Coffield; 2 Jake Carlisle; 3 Jack Steven; 4 Jade Gresham; 5 Shane Savage; 6 Sebastian Ross (vc); 7 Luke Dunstan; 8 Blake Acres; 9 Jack Steele; 10 Dan Hannebery; 11 Hunter Clark; 12 Max King; 13 Jack Lonie; 14 Jarryn Geary (c); 15 Jack Billings; 16 Jack Newnes; 17 Dylan Roberton; 18 Billy Longer; 19 Rowan Marshall; 20 David Armitage	21 Ben Long; 22 Nathan Brown; 23 Jack Bytel; 24 Logan Austin; 25 Dean Kent; 26 Josh Battle; 27 Josh Bruce; 28 Tim Membrey; 29 Jimmy Webster; 30 Ed Phillips; 31 Brandon White; 32 Paddy McCartin; 33 Ben Paton; 34 Matthew Parker; 35 Jack Sinclair; 36 Daniel McKenzie; 37 Bailey Rice; 38 Oscar Clavarino; 40 Nick Hind; 41 Robbie Young	39 Darragh Joyce (B); 42 Lewis Pierce; 43 Jonathon Marsh; 44 Callum Wilkie; 45 Sam Alabakis (B); 46 Doulton Langlands; 47 Sam Rowe; 48 Jack Mayo	Head coach: Alan Richardson; Assistant coaches: Danny Sexton (director of coaching); Brett Ratten (forward and ball movement); Brendon Lade (senior assistant); Henry Playfair (defence); Ben McGlynn (forwards); Adam Skrobalak (ruck); Peta Searle (development); Jake Batchelor (development); Danny Frawley (part-time assistant); Aaron Hamill (midfield, VFL coach); Billy Slater (leadership and development program); Legend: (c) Captain(s); (vc) Vice-captain(s); (B) Category B rookie; italics - Inactive player list; Long-term injury; (ret.) Retired; Updated: 22 February 2026; Source(s): Playing list, Coaching staff

== Season summary ==
=== Pre-season ===
**Rd**	**Date and local time**	**Opponent**	**Scores** (St Kilda's scores indicated in **bold**)			**Venue**	**Attendance**	**Ref.**
**Rd**	**Date and local time**	**Opponent**	Home	Away	Result	**Venue**	**Attendance**	**Ref.**
1	Saturday 2 March, 1:10pm	North Melbourne	11.11 (77)	**15.12 (102)**	Won by 25 points	Avalon Airport Oval (A)	1,596	
2	Sunday 10 March, 4:10pm	Western Bulldogs	12.7 (79)	**14.9 (93)**	Won by 14 points	Mars Stadium (A)	4,384	

=== Regular season ===
**Rd**	**Date and local time**	**Opponent**	**Scores** (St Kilda's scores indicated in **bold**)			**Venue**	**Attendance**	**Ladder**	**Ref.**
**Rd**	**Date and local time**	**Opponent**	Home	Away	Result	**Venue**	**Attendance**	**Ladder**	**Ref.**
1	Sunday 24 March, 1:10pm	Gold Coast	**13.8 (86)**	13.7 (85)	Won by 1 point	Marvel Stadium (H)	20,291	9th
2	Saturday 30 March, 4:35pm	Essendon	9.11 (65)	**10.16 (76)**	Won by 11 points	Marvel Stadium (A)	44,252	5th
3	Sunday 7 April, 5:20pm	Fremantle	11.5 (71)	**9.12 (66)**	Lost by 5 points	Optus Stadium (A)	38,227	10th
4	Sunday 14 April, 3:20pm	Hawthorn	**10.14 (74)**	10.9 (69)	Won by 5 points	Marvel Stadium (H)	35,883	5th
5	Saturday 20 April, 4:35pm	Melbourne	7.13 (55)	**15.5 (95)**	Won by 40 points	MCG (A)	35,558	2nd
6	Saturday 27 April, 4:35pm	Adelaide	**10.8 (68)**	15.7 (97)	Lost by 29 points	Marvel Stadium (H)	28,404	6th
7	Saturday 4 May, 1:45pm	Greater Western Sydney	18.6 (114)	**10.10 (70)**	Lost by 44 points	UNSW Canberra Oval (A)	12,633	8th
8	Saturday 11 May, 7:25pm	West Coast	**10.10 (70)**	12.16 (88)	Lost by 18 points	Marvel Stadium (H)	24,246	12th
9	Saturday 18 May, 1:45pm	Collingwood	17.10 (112)	**10.11 (71)**	Lost by 41 points	MCG (A)	60,702	13th
10	Sunday 26 May, 3:20pm	Carlton	**9.14 (68)**	8.7 (55)	Won by 13 points	Marvel Stadium (H)	35,058	11th
11	Sunday 2 June, 2:20pm	Port Adelaide	**9.15 (69)**	22.7 (139)	Lost by 70 points	Jiangwan Stadium (H)	9,142	12th
12	Bye							13th
13	Saturday 15 June, 1:45pm	Gold Coast	11.10 (76)	**11.14 (80)**	Won by 4 points	Riverway Stadium (A)	7,243	11th
14	Saturday 22 June, 4:35pm	Brisbane Lions	**8.11 (59)**	17.13 (115)	Lost by 56 points	Marvel Stadium (H)	22,885	11th
15	Sunday 30 June, 1:10pm	Richmond	**10.10 (70)**	16.7 (103)	Lost by 33 points	Marvel Stadium (H)	40,962	14th
16	Sunday 7 July, 3:20pm	North Melbourne	17.10 (112)	**11.7 (73)**	Lost by 39 points	Blundstone Arena (A)	10,696	15th
17	Saturday 13 July, 7:25pm	Geelong	12.12 (84)	**8.9 (57)**	Lost by 27 points	GHMBA Stadium (A)	24,035	15th
18	Sunday 21 July, 4:40pm	Western Bulldogs	**17.14 (116)**	14.5 (89)	Won by 27 points	Marvel Stadium (H)	21,705	14th
19	Saturday 27 July, 7:25pm	Melbourne	**15.14 (104)**	13.7 (85)	Won by 19 points	Marvel Stadium (H)	22,854	13th
20	Saturday 3 August, 7:40pm	Adelaide	14.8 (92)	**10.10 (70)**	Lost by 22 points	Adelaide Oval (A)	39,984	14th
21	Sunday 11 August, 1:10pm	Fremantle	**10.12 (72)**	10.9 (69)	Won by 3 points	Marvel Stadium (H)	17,715	13th
22	Saturday 17 August, 1:45pm	Carlton	11.12 (78)	**10.8 (68)**	Lost by 10 points	MCG (A)	51,786	14th
23	Saturday 24 August, 1:45pm	Sydney	17.7 (109)	**8.16 (64)**	Lost by 45 points	SCG (A)	33,722	14th

== Ladder ==
Pos	Team	Pld	W	L	D	PF	PA	PP	Pts	Qualification
1	Geelong	22	16	6	0	1984	1462	135.7	64	Finals series
2	Brisbane Lions	22	16	6	0	2004	1694	118.3	64	Finals series
3	Richmond (P)	22	16	6	0	1892	1664	113.7	64	Finals series
4	Collingwood	22	15	7	0	1885	1601	117.7	60	Finals series
5	West Coast	22	15	7	0	1902	1691	112.5	60	Finals series
6	Greater Western Sydney	22	13	9	0	1926	1669	115.4	52	Finals series
7	Western Bulldogs	22	12	10	0	1941	1810	107.2	48	Finals series
8	Essendon	22	12	10	0	1702	1784	95.4	48	Finals series
9	Hawthorn	22	11	11	0	1742	1602	108.7	44	
10	Port Adelaide	22	11	11	0	1806	1714	105.4	44	
11	Adelaide	22	10	12	0	1776	1761	100.9	40	
12	North Melbourne	22	10	12	0	1824	1834	99.5	40	
13	Fremantle	22	9	13	0	1579	1718	91.9	36	
14	St Kilda	22	9	13	0	1645	1961	83.9	36	
15	Sydney	22	8	14	0	1706	1746	97.7	32	
16	Carlton	22	7	15	0	1609	1905	84.5	28	
17	Melbourne	22	5	17	0	1569	1995	78.6	20	
18	Gold Coast	22	3	19	0	1351	2232	60.5	12	

Source: AFL Tables
Rules for classification: 1) points; 2) percentage; 3) number of points for.
(P) Premiers
