= 2018 St Kilda Football Club season =

St Kilda Football Club
2018 season
- President: Matt Finnis
- Coach: Alan Richardson (5th season)
- Captain: Jarryn Geary (2nd season)
- Home ground: Etihad Stadium (Capacity: 53,347)
- AFL season: 16th

The 2018 St Kilda Football Club season was the 122nd in the club's history. Coached by Alan Richardson and captained by Jarryn Geary, they competed in the AFL's 2018 Toyota Premiership Season.

== Squad ==
St Kilda Football Club
Senior list		Rookie list	Coaching staff
1 Tom Hickey; 2 Jake Carlisle; 3 Jack Steven; 4 Jade Gresham; 5 Shane Savage; 6 Sebastian Ross; 7 Luke Dunstan; 8 Blake Acres; 9 Jack Steele; 10 Nathan Freeman; 11 Hunter Clark; 13 Jack Lonie; 14 Jarryn Geary (c); 15 Jack Billings; 16 Jack Newnes; 17 Dylan Roberton; 18 Billy Longer; 19 Sam Gilbert; 20 David Armitage; 21 Ben Long	22 Nathan Brown; 23 Hugh Goddard; 24 Logan Austin; 25 Koby Stevens (ret); 26 Josh Battle; 27 Josh Bruce; 28 Tim Membrey; 29 Jimmy Webster; 30 Ed Phillips; 31 Brandon White; 32 Paddy McCartin; 33 Nick Coffield; 34 Nathan Wright; 35 Jack Sinclair; 36 Daniel McKenzie; 37 Bailey Rice; 38 Oscar Clavarino; 41 Darren Minchington; 44 Maverick Weller; 45 Ben Paton	39 Darragh Joyce (B); 40 Ray Connellan (B); 42 Lewis Pierce; 43 Rowan Marshall; 46 Doulton Langlands	Head coach: Alan Richardson; Assistant coaches: Danny Sexton (director of coaching and strategy); Rohan Welsh (forwards); Henry Playfair (defense); Adam Kingsley (midfield); Adam Skrobalak (ruck); Simon McPhee (head of development); Peta Searle (development); Ben McGlynn (development); Danny Frawley (specialist defensive coach); Aaron Hamill (Sandringham VFL coach); Robbie Chancellor (manager of performance analysis); Legend: (c) Captain(s); (vc) Vice-captain(s); (B) Category B rookie; (ret) retired; Updated: 6 April 2018; Source(s): Playing list, Coaching staff

== Season summary ==
=== Pre-season ===
**Rd**	**Date and local time**	**Opponent**	**Scores** (St Kilda's scores indicated in **bold**)			**Venue**	**Attendance**
**Rd**	**Date and local time**	**Opponent**	Home	Away	Result	**Venue**	**Attendance**
1	Wednesday 28 February, 7:10pm	Carlton	13.11 (89)	**9.13 (67)**	Lost by 22 points	Ikon Park (A)	8,098
2	Thursday 8 March, 7:05pm	Melbourne	18.11 (119)	**14.9 (93)**	Lost by 26 points	Casey Fields (A)	4,567

=== Regular season ===
**Rd**	**Date and local time**	**Opponent**	**Scores** (St Kilda's scores indicated in **bold**)			**Venue**	**Attendance**	**Ladder**	**Ref.**
**Rd**	**Date and local time**	**Opponent**	Home	Away	Result	**Venue**	**Attendance**	**Ladder**	**Ref.**
1	Saturday, 24 March (3:35 pm)	Brisbane Lions	**16.11 (107)**	12.10 (82)	Won by 25 points	Etihad Stadium (H)	23,731	6th
2	Friday, 30 March (4:20 pm)	North Melbourne	13.17 (95)	**5.13 (43)**	Lost by 52 points	Etihad Stadium (A)	33,966	13th
3	Saturday, 7 April (7:25 pm)	Adelaide	**7.13 (55)**	15.14 (104)	Lost by 49 points	Etihad Stadium (H)	19,324	15th
4	Sunday, 15 April (4:40 pm)	Geelong	15.13 (103)	**7.14 (56)**	Lost by 47 points	GMHBA Stadium (A)	27,338	16th
5	Saturday, 21 April (1:45 pm)	Greater Western Sydney	**10.13 (73)**	9.19 (73)	Match drawn	Etihad Stadium (H)	14,956	15th
6	Saturday, 28 April (7:25 pm)	Hawthorn	13.11 (89)	**7.12 (54)**	Lost by 35 points	University of Tasmania Stadium (A)	15,741	16th
7	Sunday, 6 May (3:20 pm)	Melbourne	**9.13 (67)**	16.10 (106)	Lost by 39 points	Etihad Stadium (H)	25,496	16th
8	Saturday, 12 May (8:10 pm)	Fremantle	13.11 (89)	**8.11 (59)**	Lost by 30 points	Optus Stadium (A)	41,752	16th
9	Saturday, 19 May (7:25 pm)	Collingwood	**10.12 (72)**	15.10 (100)	Lost by 28 points	Etihad Stadium (H)	33,994	16th
10	Saturday, 26 May (1:45 pm)	Richmond	15.15 (105)	**12.5 (77)**	Lost by 28 points	MCG (A)	48,850	16th
11	Saturday, 2 June (7:20 pm)	West Coast	16.5 (101)	**14.4 (88)**	Lost by 13 points	Optus Stadium (A)	54,188	16th
12	Saturday, 9 June (7:25 pm)	Sydney	**7.13 (55)**	19.12 (126)	Lost by 71 points	Etihad Stadium (H)	27,569	16th
13	Saturday, 16 June (4:35 pm)	Gold Coast	11.12 (78)	**11.14 (80)**	Won by 2 points	Metricon Stadium (A)	10,181	16th
14	Bye Round							16th
15	Sunday, 1 July (1:10 pm)	Melbourne	18.9 (117)	**18.11 (119)**	Won by 2 points	MCG (A)	38,910	15th
16	Saturday, 7 July (4:35 pm)	Port Adelaide	12.14 (86)	7.8 (50)	Lost by 36 points	Adelaide Oval (A)	36,253	15th
17	Friday, 13 July (7:50 pm)	Carlton	**16.20 (116)**	7.10 (52)	Won by 64 points	Etihad Stadium (H)	33,780	15th
18	Friday, 20 July (7:40 pm)	Richmond	**8.9 (57)**	16.15 (111)	Lost by 54 points	Etihad Stadium (H)	36,269	15th
19	Saturday, 28 July (4:05 pm)	Greater Western Sydney	13.8 (86)	**8.13 (61)**	Lost by 25 points	Spotless Stadium (A)	12,014	15th
20	Saturday, 4 August (7:25 pm)	Western Bulldogs	**9.14 (68)**	15.13 (103)	Lost by 35 points	Etihad Stadium (H)	20,748	15th
21	Friday, 10 August (7:50 pm)	Essendon	18.14 (122)	**11.13 (79)**	Lost by 43 points	Etihad Stadium (A)	37,483	15th
22	Saturday, 18 August (7:25 pm)	Hawthorn	**11.10 (76)**	12.8 (80)	Lost by 4 points	Etihad Stadium (H)	24,795	16th
23	Sunday, 26 August (4:40 pm)	North Melbourne	14.10 (94)	**17.15 (117)**	Lost by 23 points	Etihad Stadium (H)	19,866	16th

== Ladder ==
Pos	Team	Pld	W	L	D	PF	PA	PP	Pts	Qualification
1	Richmond	22	18	4	0	2143	1574	136.1	72	2018 finals
2	West Coast (P)	22	16	6	0	2012	1657	121.4	64	2018 finals
3	Collingwood	22	15	7	0	2046	1699	120.4	60	2018 finals
4	Hawthorn	22	15	7	0	1972	1642	120.1	60	2018 finals
5	Melbourne	22	14	8	0	2299	1749	131.4	56	2018 finals
6	Sydney	22	14	8	0	1822	1664	109.5	56	2018 finals
7	Greater Western Sydney	22	13	8	1	1898	1661	114.3	54	2018 finals
8	Geelong	22	13	9	0	2045	1554	131.6	52	2018 finals
9	North Melbourne	22	12	10	0	1950	1790	108.9	48	
10	Port Adelaide	22	12	10	0	1780	1654	107.6	48	
11	Essendon	22	12	10	0	1932	1838	105.1	48	
12	Adelaide	22	12	10	0	1941	1865	104.1	48	
13	Western Bulldogs	22	8	14	0	1575	2037	77.3	32	
14	Fremantle	22	8	14	0	1556	2041	76.2	32	
15	Brisbane Lions	22	5	17	0	1825	2049	89.1	20	
16	St Kilda	22	4	17	1	1606	2125	75.6	18	
17	Gold Coast	22	4	18	0	1308	2182	59.9	16	
18	Carlton	22	2	20	0	1353	2282	59.3	8	

Source: AFL
Rules for classification: 1) points; 2) percentage; 3) number of points for.
(P) Premiers
