= Oscar Clavarino =

Australian rules footballer (born 1999)

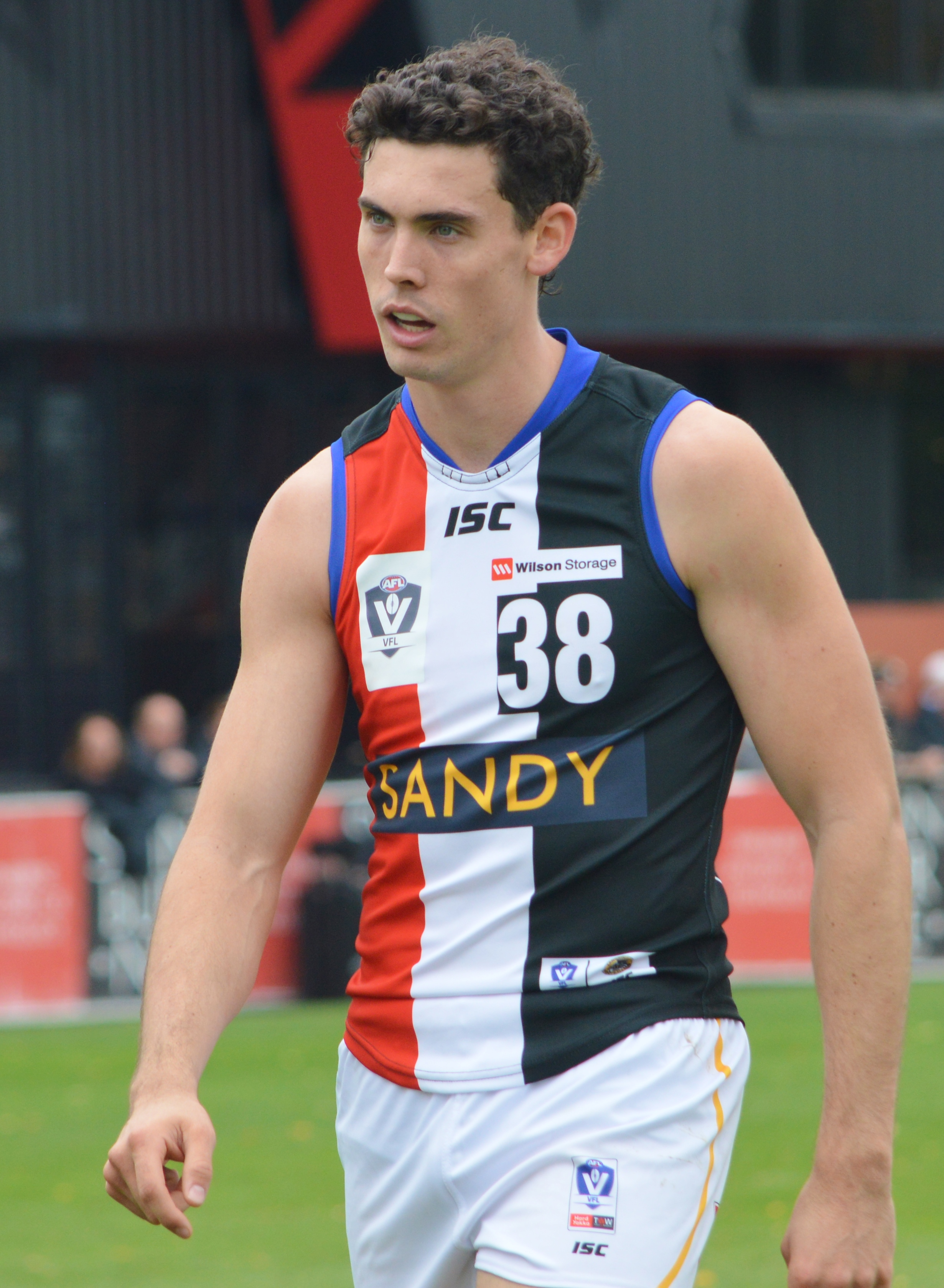
- Clavarino with Sandringham in April 2021

Personal information
- Born: 22 May 1999 (age 27)
- Original team: Berwick (SEFNL)
- Draft: No. 35, 2017 national draft
- Debut: Round 11, 2021, St Kilda vs. North Melbourne
- Height: 197 cm (6 ft 6 in)
- Weight: 89 kg (196 lb)
- Position: Key defender

Playing career^{1}
Years	Club	Games (Goals)
2021	St Kilda	5 (0)
- ^{1} Playing statistics correct to the end of the 2021 season.

Oscar Clavarino (born 22 May 1999) is an Australian rules footballer who played for St Kilda in the Australian Football League (AFL). Clavarino, a key defender, is noted for his intercept marking ability.

Drafted as a second-round pick in 2017, Clavarino's AFL career was curtailed by slow development, ankle and hamstring injuries, and interruptions from the COVID-19 pandemic. He spent most of his time at St Kilda playing for their second-tier Victorian Football League (VFL) affiliate, Sandringham. In 2021, Clavarino finally made his AFL debut, 1283 days after he had been drafted. St Kilda delisted him at the season's conclusion; he continued his football with South Adelaide in the South Australian National Football League (SANFL).

== Early life and junior football ==
Clavarino grew up in Melbourne's southeast. A Hawthorn supporter, he aspired to playing AFL "since he [could] remember". He played his junior football with Berwick, beginning as a tall utility comfortable playing forward or in defence. When Clavarino was nine years old, he played in an Auskick match on the Melbourne Cricket Ground.

Clavarino was educated at Haileybury, a member of the Associated Public Schools (APS) group, and was in the leadership group for the school's football team. He gained two mentors at Haileybury: Josh Battle, a good friend who was drafted by St Kilda a year before Clavarino and gave him advice on the time and diet management required of professional footballers; and Matthew Lloyd, the former Essendon forward, who was Clavarino's assistant coach from the age of 16.

Clavarino played in the TAC Cup for the Dandenong Stingrays. In 2017, his draft year, he captained the team, averaging 16 disposals and six marks per game.

In 2015, Clavarino represented Vic Country at the AFL under-16 national championships, held on the Gold Coast in July. He appeared at the 2016 under-18 national championships as a bottom-ager. On his return in 2017, he co-captained Vic Country alongside James Worpel and made the All-Australian side.

In August 2016, Clavarino was named among thirty prospective draftees for the following year in the AFL Academy's level-two intake. In December that year, he trained with Melbourne for two weeks as part of an Academy program to give prospective draftees insight into life at an AFL club.

Ahead of the 2017 national draft, it was unclear when Clavarino would be selected; media assessments placed him between a late first-round pick to an early third-round pick. He was considered the best intercept marker in his cohort and noted for his leadership.

== AFL career ==
Clavarino was drafted by St Kilda with pick 35 in the 2017 national draft. Clavarino was St Kilda's third selection; the club had already taken Hunter Clark and Nick Coffield with picks 7 and 8 and went on to choose Ben Paton with pick 46. St Kilda sent Clavarino's new teammate David Armitage around to his home to present him with a club guernsey.

Clavarino spent his early seasons with St Kilda developing his strength to AFL standards. Describing himself as a "tall and skinny" player in his reflections, Clavarino did not expect to play at AFL level for a few seasons. He named several mentors at St Kilda: among the staff, Aaron Hamill, the VFL coach; and Steve Forcone, the strength and conditioning coach. Among the players, he named defensive veterans Nathan Brown and Dylan Roberton.

In February 2019, Clavarino injured his ankle in a marking contest during an intra-club practice match. The injury sidelined him for eight weeks. This was a serious setback – Clavarino had been anticipated to make his AFL debut in the opening round of the season, since Brown was suspended and fellow key defender Jake Carlisle was recovering from an injured back. Clavarino ended up playing 14 VFL matches with Sandringham for the year, but did not play an AFL game. He signed a one-year contract extension in October; Simon Lethlean, the club's general manager of football, acknowledged Clavarino's position as a "bigger-bodied defender" meant he would take some time to develop as a player.

Clavarino's development was further interrupted in 2020 by the emerging COVID-19 pandemic. The AFL season was suspended for more than two months and only resumed under strict quarantine arrangements – the VFL season was cancelled altogether. In the absence of reserves football, Clavarino pressed his case for AFL selection through the practice games arranged against other clubs. These scratch matches were played under relaxed rules and reduced numbers; on one occasion, Clavarino and some teammates played for Essendon to balance their match. The pandemic was not the only interruption to Clavarino's progress; he also suffered a hamstring injury in June, which kept him out of football for several weeks. In November, St Kilda moved Clavarino and his teammate Darragh Joyce to its rookie list under a new AFL provision permitting clubs to transfer two senior players in this way without waiting for the rookie draft.

In May 2021, Clavarino finally played his first AFL match, 1283 days after being drafted; a twenty-point victory over North Melbourne in round 11. Forcone delivered him the news of his selection at a team meeting. Victoria was still in COVID-19 lockdown and AFL matches in the state were played without crowds, so Clavarino's family was unable to attend the game; St Kilda set up a videoconference so they could watch his guernsey presentation. Clavarino held his place for the following week's nine-point loss against Sydney, but he was then dropped. He returned in round 19 against West Coast, where he played what saints.com.au regarded as his best match; he accrued 14 disposals, three inside-50s and six marks. Clavarino played in St Kilda's final two matches for the year, ending with a 58-point win over Fremantle.

St Kilda delisted Clavarino in September. During his time at the club, he played five AFL matches and 39 VFL matches.

== State-league football ==
Upon his delisting by St Kilda, Clavarino received contract offers from several VFL and SANFL clubs. He opted for the SANFL because he wanted a fresh start; he also felt VFL clubs with AFL affiliates tended to change their starting lineups too often because they needed to accommodate their AFL-listed players. Clavarino set himself the goal of getting a second opportunity in the AFL.

Clavarino signed with South Adelaide. His recruitment was considered timely, as key defender Sam Skinner had just left for Port Adelaide's AFL side. Port Adelaide also listed Clavarino among 20 players its AFL side could call upon if too many of its own players became unavailable through COVID-19 isolation procedures. Clavarino made his SANFL debut in the opening round of the 2022 season against Central Districts. By 2023, he had been named in South Adelaide's leadership group; in 2024, he became the club's vice-captain.
