= Bailey Rice =

Bailey Rice may refer to:

- Bailey Rice (Australian footballer) (born 1997), Australia rules footballer and American college football punter
- Bailey Rice (Scottish footballer) (born 2006), Scottish football midfielder (Rangers FC)
