= Zak Jones =

Australian rules footballer (born 1995)

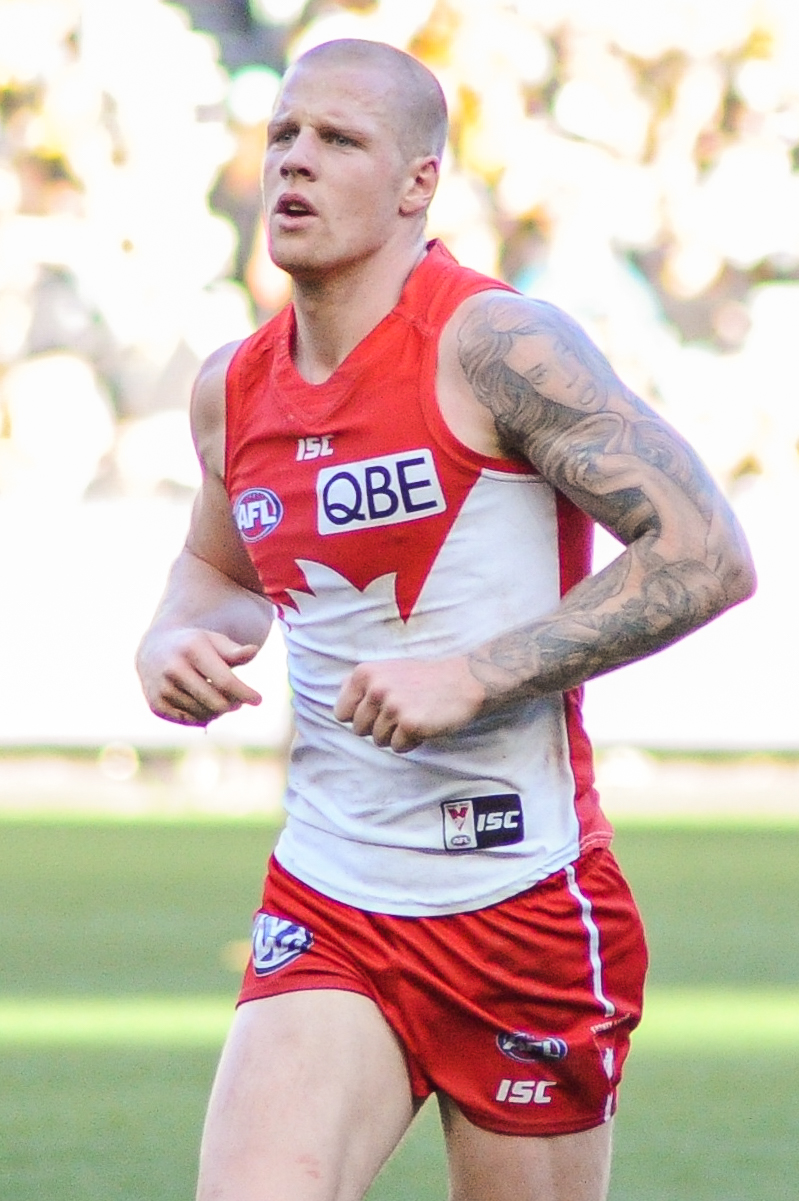
- Jones playing for Sydney in June 2017

Personal information
- Full name: Zachary Jones
- Born: 15 March 1995 (age 31)
- Original team: Dandenong Stingrays (TAC Cup)
- Draft: No. 15, 2013 national draft
- Height: 181 cm (5 ft 11 in)
- Weight: 79 kg (174 lb)
- Position: Midfielder

Playing career
Years	Club	Games (Goals)
2014–2019	Sydney	90 (23)
2020–2025	St Kilda	74 (13)
Total		164 (36)

Career highlights
- Silk–Miller Medal: 2021

Zak Jones (born 15 March 1995) is a former professional Australian rules footballer who played for the Sydney Swans and St Kilda in the Australian Football League (AFL).

== Early life ==
Zachary is the younger brother of former Melbourne captain Nathan Jones. Jones played for the Dandenong Stringrays in the TAC Cup and was a joint-winner of the Most Valuable Player for Vic Country at the 2013 AFL Under 18 Championships and was named in the All-Australian team.

He was recruited by the Sydney Swans with the 15th overall selection in the 2013 national draft.

== AFL career ==
=== Sydney Swans ===
He made his senior debut against Richmond, at the MCG in round 14 of the 2014 AFL season.

In 2016, he was able to overcome an ankle injury and a severe concussion through the season, and was selected to play in the 2016 AFL Grand Final, cementing himself a spot in the team.

Coming out of contract at the end of the 2019 season, Jones requested a trade to St Kilda. Swans CEO Tom Harley said of Jones "everyone knows within footy circles he comes from a really strong and tight family and his desire to return to Victoria is to be closer to his family. St Kilda is the club that has expressed interest and Zak has let us know that, he has been really transparent about that...We actually had some challenges in re-signing him last time so this wasn’t totally unexpected." At the conclusion of the 2019 AFL season, Jones and pick 56 was traded to St Kilda for pick 32, 76 and a 2020 3rd Round pick.

=== St Kilda FC ===
Jones made his St Kilda debut in Round 1 of the 2020 AFL Season against North Melbourne. Jones was one of the best-on-ground in the Saints' round two win over the Western Bulldogs, collecting 29 disposals and a goal in a match with shortened 16-minute quarters. Jones left the field early in the Saints' Round 4 win against Richmond, and missed the Round 5 win against Carlton as a result. Jones eventually managed 16 of a possible 19 games (including two finals for nine wins and seven losses) in his first year at the Saints, finishing sixth in the Trevor Barker Award.

Jones suffered a hamstring injury in the 2021 pre-season and did not participate in the Saints' pre-season matches. Jones had a career best game in round seven against Hawthorn, winning the Silk–Miller Memorial Medal in the Blue Ribbon Cup game and collecting 37 disposals, two goals, six tackles, eight marks and had 13 score involvements. The following week, against Gold Coast, Jones had 31 disposals and laid seven tackles to be amongst the Saints' best in their round eight win. In mid-May, Jones ruptured his right quad at training ahead of round nine. He underwent surgery and was unavailable for selection for approximately eight weeks. Despite the injuries, Jones returned immediately to the side Round 17 and having a big impact, collecting twenty-six disposals (13 contested) and a game-high 10 clearances from just over 60 percent game-time. Jones ultimately played seven consecutive games to see out the season, including a prolific 32-disposal game against West Coast and a strong 30 disposal game against Carlton. Of his return to the side despite injury, teammate Seb Ross stated that "every time Jonesy’s had an injury, he’s basically nearly returned straight into the AFL team off just the work he’s been able to do in rehab. You don’t see that too often. The way he attacks his rehab and prepares his mind and body to be able to come straight in and not look out of place with his run and drive is a real credit to his professionalism."

Jones was delisted by St Kilda at the end of the 2025 AFL season, after 74 matches over 6 seasons with the club..

== Injuries ==
- Zak got injured against North Melbourne in 2019, tweaking his left hamstring after receiving a shove from Jed Anderson.
- Jones in 2016 missed 4-6weeks after a high ankle sprain which he suffered in a match against Hawthorn at the SCG

== Statistics ==
Legend
G	Goals	K	Kicks	D	Disposals	T	Tackles
B	Behinds	H	Handballs	M	Marks

Season	Team	No.	Games	Totals							Averages (per game)							Votes
Season	Team	No.	Games	G	B	K	H	D	M	T	G	B	K	H	D	M	T	Votes
2014	Sydney	10	4	1	0	11	18	29	3	7	0.3	0.0	2.8	4.5	7.3	0.8	1.8	0
2015	Sydney	10	11	0	0	69	49	118	20	27	0.0	0.0	6.3	4.5	10.7	1.8	2.5	0
2016	Sydney	10	16	3	1	153	85	238	33	52	0.2	0.1	9.6	5.3	14.9	2.1	3.3	0
2017	Sydney	10	23	10	6	256	202	458	109	79	0.4	0.3	11.1	8.8	19.9	4.7	3.4	2
2018	Sydney	10	19	6	3	194	176	370	76	35	0.3	0.2	10.2	9.3	19.5	4.0	1.8	0
2019	Sydney	10	17	3	7	217	163	380	68	67	0.2	0.4	12.8	9.6	22.4	4.0	3.9	0
2020 (Note: The 2020 season was played with 17 home-and-away matches per team (down from 22) and 16-minute quarters with time on (down from 20-minute quarters with time on) due to the impact of the COVID-19 pandemic.)	St Kilda	3	16	5	8	157	147	304	47	57	0.3	0.5	9.8	9.2	19.0	2.9	3.6	7
2021	St Kilda	3	13	4	2	163	141	304	49	57	0.3	0.2	12.5	10.8	23.4	3.8	4.4	4
2022	St Kilda	3	13	2	1	117	118	235	38	46	0.2	0.1	9.0	9.1	18.1	2.9	3.5	0
2023	St Kilda	3	4	0	2	26	34	60	9	11	0.0	0.5	6.5	8.5	15.0	2.3	2.8	0
2024	St Kilda	3	13	2	0	102	105	207	42	33	0.2	0.0	7.8	8.1	15.9	3.2	2.5	1
2025	St Kilda	3	15	0	3	112	130	242	50	26	0.0	0.2	7.5	8.7	16.1	3.3	1.7	0
Career			164	36	33	1577	1368	2945	544	497	0.2	0.2	9.6	8.3	18.0	3.3	3.0	14
