= Josh Battle =

Australian rules footballer

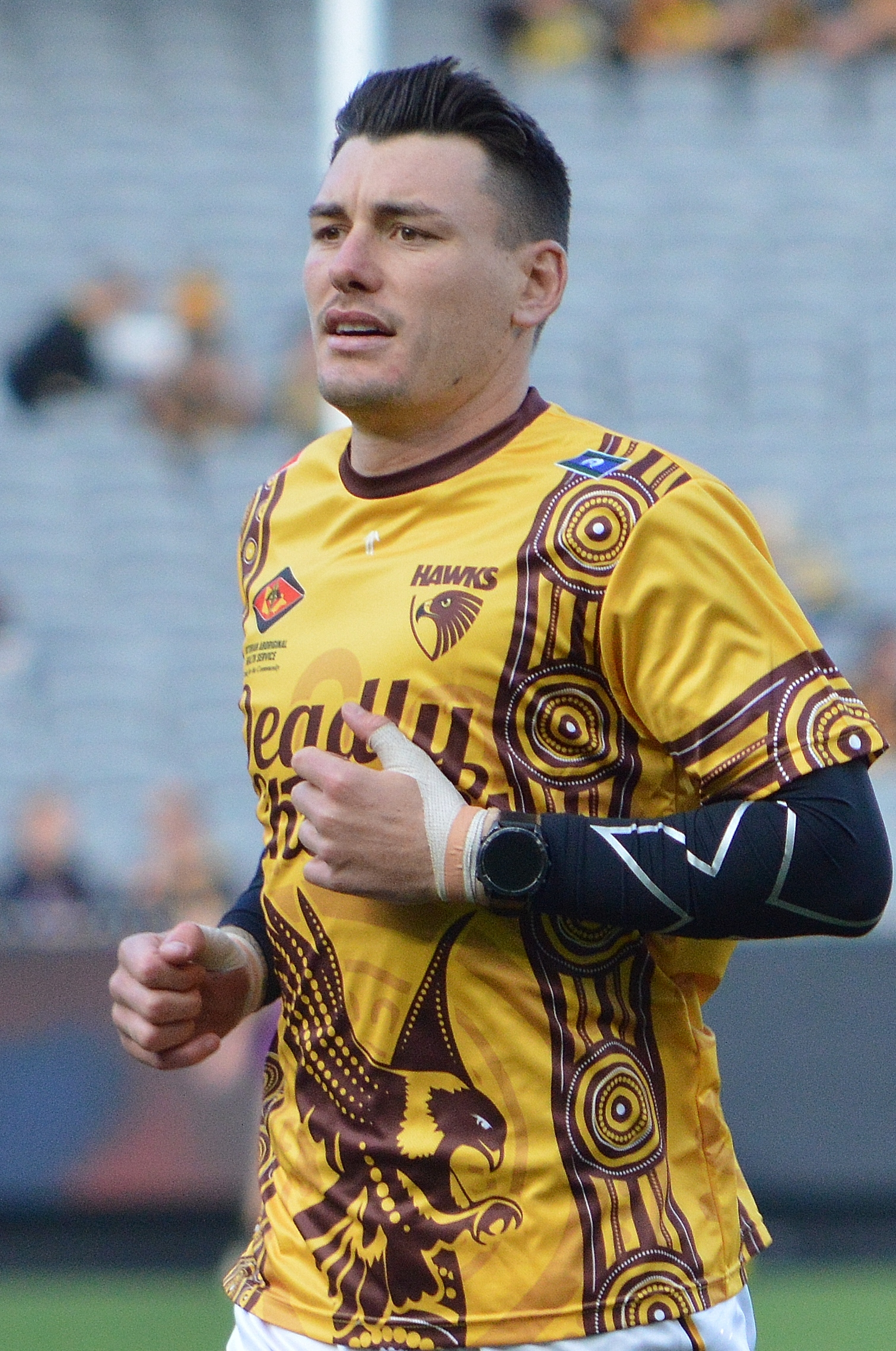
- Battle playing for Hawthorn in May 2026

Personal information
- Full name: Josh Battle
- Born: 1 September 1998 (age 28)
- Original teams: Dandenong Stingrays (TAC Cup), Haileybury (APS)
- Draft: No. 39, 2016 national draft
- Debut: Round 17, 2017, St Kilda vs. Essendon, at Etihad Stadium
- Height: 193 cm (6 ft 4 in)
- Weight: 89 kg (196 lb)
- Position: Key defender

Club information
- Current club: Hawthorn
- Number: 24

Playing career^{1}
Years	Club	Games (Goals)
2017–2024	St Kilda	123 (30)
2025–	Hawthorn	49 (2)
Total		172 (31)

Representative team honours^{2}
Years	Team	Games (Goals)
2026–	Victoria	1 (0)
- ^{1} Playing statistics correct to the end of 2026.^{2} Representative statistics correct as of 2026.

Career highlights
- All-Australian team: 2025; AFL Rising Star nominee: 2019

Josh Battle (born 1 September 1998) is a professional Australian rules footballer playing for the Hawthorn Football Club in the Australian Football League (AFL). He was originally drafted by St Kilda Football Club with their second selection and thirty-ninth overall in the 2016 national draft. He made his debut in the sixty-one point loss to Essendon at Etihad Stadium in round seventeen of the 2017 season. Battle joined Hawthorn as an unrestricted free agent following the 2024 AFL season and won an All Australian Blazer in his first year at Hawthorn.

== Early career ==
Battle played his junior football for Hallam Hawks football club and Narre South Lions in the South East Juniors. Battle was a Hawthorn supporter as a child.

Before committing to AFL, Battle was a talented cricketer as a junior receiving a cricket scholarship to Haileybury College. He also played in the Victorian Under-17 side. Battle eventually chose AFL after he was selected by the AIS/AFL Academy. On his choice, Battle stated that "in Year 10, when footy was starting to ramp up with bottom-age Stingrays and trying to play cricket, I knew I couldn't do both, because it was just too hard on the body. I was missing trainings for either one of the two, so it wasn't fair on other guys that were missing out. I sat down with Dad and he said, 'Do whatever you find most enjoyable and what you see yourself doing in the future', and that was footy."

At Haileybury College, Battle formed a friendship with Essendon great Matthew Lloyd, who was an assistant coach of the school's senior football team. Prior to commencing at Haileybury in year 9, he attended Fountain Gate Secondary College in Narre Warren.

Battle was regarded as one of the best forwards in his draft year, after kicking the most goals of any division at the under-18s championships - 11 goals in four games for Vic Country. Battle also impressed at TAC Cup level, booting 24.13 across eight games. Battle was invited to the AFL Draft Combine where he impressed with his elite endurance by running a 10:07 3km time-trial and reaching 13.7 in the Beep Test. He also won the 3km test at the AFL Academy camp in January that year.

== AFL career ==
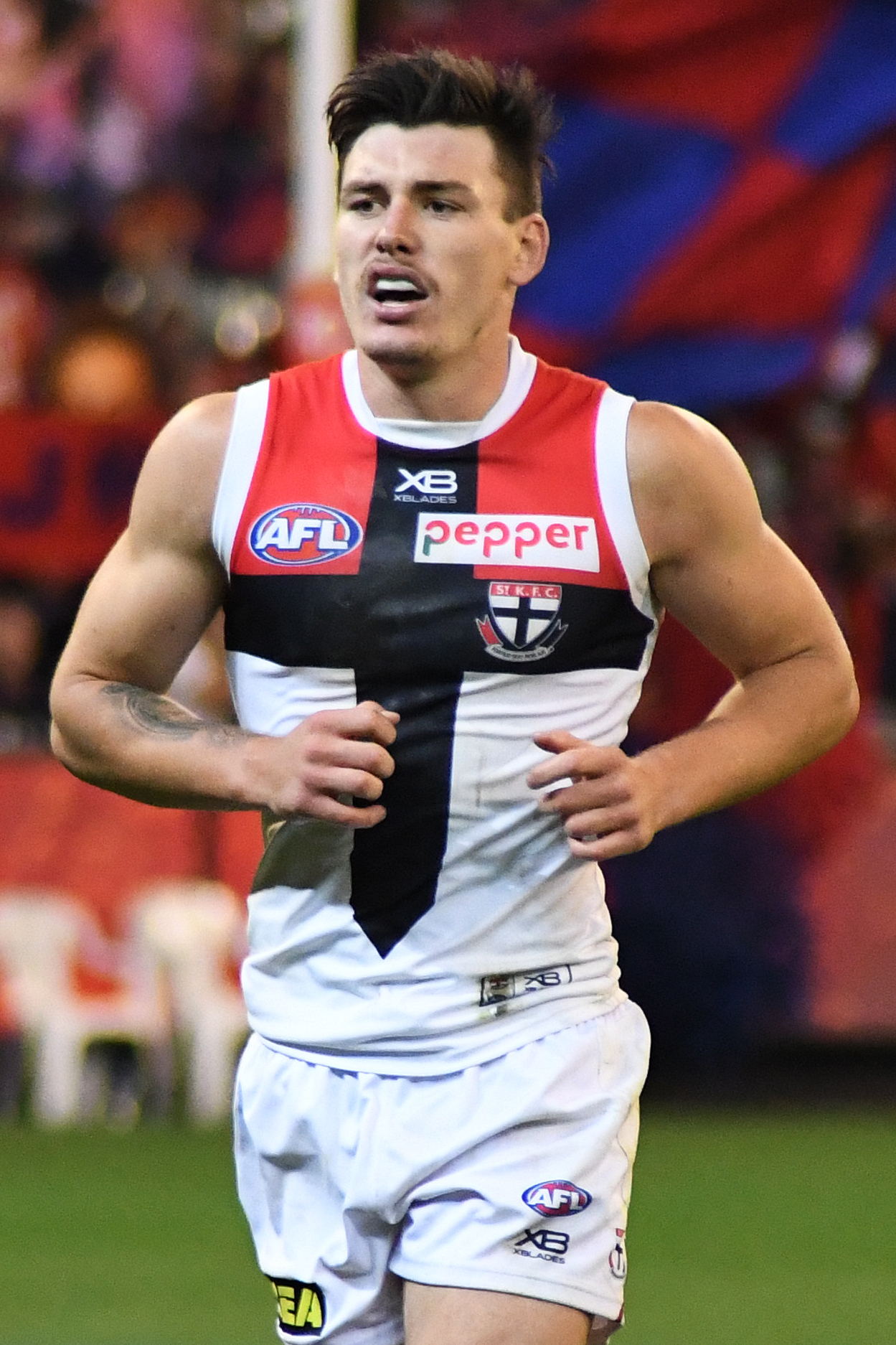
Battle playing for St Kilda during the 2019 AFL season

=== St Kilda ===
Battle completed year 12 studies in his first season at the Saints. Of juggling both high school and football commitments, Battle stated that "at the time I just wanted to play footy and wasn't too keen on school, but I had good people in my corner who said it would be best to finish school because you don't know how long footy will last. It was difficult because I was only at footy one day a week and the rest of the time I'd train on my own with a couple of coaches, but I was lucky enough to make my debut on the school holidays – that was pretty cool." Battle made his debut, still as a schoolboy, in round 17 against Essendon.

Battle played six games in 2018, and may have appeared in more if it were not for injuries. Battle sustained a fractured eye socket and also battled concussion symptoms in the last three rounds of 2018. Battle kicked two and three-goal hauls in his second and third games of AFL respectively. Of just his second game, Coach Alan Richardson described Battle's performance as "a shining light...He kicked a couple of goals, but it was probably more his physicality, his ability to be able to put enormous pressure on when he had the opportunity to tackle." In 2017 and 2018, Battle spent 90% of his time playing as a key forward.

In 2019, Battle played primarily as a defender, a position he'd never played prior. Coach Richardson saw Battle able to play a James Sicily-type role. He was a mainstay of the St Kilda side that year, playing 19 of a possible 22 games and averaged 14.7 possessions, six marks and three tackles a game. Battle found himself playing on some of the stars of the competition, including Jack Gunston (who he kept goalless and had 16 touches himself in a round four win) and Jack Darling (who he conceded just one goal and collected a career-high 21 possessions in a three-goal loss). Battle received a 2019 AFL Rising Star nomination in round 22 for his 16 disposal effort against Carlton.

2020 saw the Saints reach finals for the first time since 2011, and Battle played a big part in a COVID-interrupted season. Battle was unable to break into the side early in the season, with new defender Dougal Howard cementing a place in defence. Battle was called up in round four and played four straight games, including three wins. Battle suffered a concussion following the round seven win over Adelaide. He returned the week later, and played nine consecutive games before a foot injury ruled him out of the Saints' elimination final. Battle recovered and played his first AFL final in the Saints' Semi Final loss to eventual premiers Richmond. He ultimately played 14 of a possible 19 games that year.

2021 saw Battle playing as a utility, seeing action in most parts of the ground. According to Champion Data, he spent 39.5 per cent of his time as a key forward, 34.2 per cent of his time on a wing, 21.2 per cent of his time as a key defender, and 5.1 percent of his time in the ruck. Battle played 16 consecutive matches in 2021 (eight wins, eight losses, two as a medical sub), before a stress fracture in his left ankle forced him to miss the remainder of the season.

Ahead of the 2022 season, Battle was asked to play as a key defender. In the Round Two win again Fremantle, Battle had an influential game with 21 disposals, 13 marks and 13 intercepts possessions.

=== Hawthorn ===
At the conclusion of the 2024 AFL season, Battle announced his intention to move to his childhood club, Hawthorn, as an unrestricted free agent. The move was made official on 4 October.

Battle made his debut for Hawthorn in a 20-point victory over the Sydney Swans at the Sydney Cricket Ground in Opening Round of the 2025 season. Battle played every match for Hawthorn in his first season, and was rewarded with his first selection in an All-Australian team.

== Statistics ==
Updated to the end of 2026.

Legend
G	Goals	K	Kicks	D	Disposals	T	Tackles
B	Behinds	H	Handballs	M	Marks

Season	Team	No.	Games	Totals							Averages (per game)							Votes
Season	Team	No.	Games	G	B	K	H	D	M	T	G	B	K	H	D	M	T	Votes
2017	St Kilda	26	1	1	0	3	2	5	2	0	1.0	0.0	3.0	2.0	5.0	2.0	0.0	0
2018	St Kilda	26	6	7	4	33	24	57	17	13	1.2	0.7	5.5	4.0	9.5	2.8	2.2	0
2019	St Kilda	26	19	3	1	204	76	280	115	52	0.2	0.1	10.7	4.0	14.7	6.1	2.7	0
2020 (Note: The 2020 season was played with 17 home-and-away matches per team (down from 22) and 16-minute quarters with time on (down from 20-minute quarters with time on) due to the impact of the COVID-19 pandemic.)	St Kilda	26	14	12	9	108	34	142	52	26	0.9	0.6	7.7	2.4	10.1	3.7	1.9	0
2021	St Kilda	26	16	3	7	113	73	186	61	46	0.2	0.4	7.1	4.6	11.6	3.8	2.9	0
2022	St Kilda	26	21	0	0	254	94	348	142	40	0.0	0.0	12.1	4.5	16.6	6.8	1.9	0
2023	St Kilda	26	23	1	0	216	112	328	146	39	0.0	0.0	9.4	4.9	14.3	6.3	1.7	0
2024	St Kilda	26	23	3	3	253	156	409	174	30	0.1	0.1	11.0	6.8	17.8	7.6	1.3	0
2025	Hawthorn	24	26	0	2	296	184	480	136	49	0.0	0.1	11.4	7.1	18.5	5.2	1.9	5
2026	Hawthorn	24	23	2	3	298	157	455	145	34	0.1	0.1	13.0	6.8	19.8	6.3	1.5	5
Career			172	32	29	1778	912	2690	990	329	0.2	0.2	10.3	5.3	15.6	5.8	1.9	10

== Honours and achievements ==
Individual

- All-Australian team: 2025
- AFL Rising Star nominee: 2019

== Personal life ==
Josh has a partner, Casey, and two children named Bobbi and Billie.
