= Dougal Howard =

Australian rules footballer

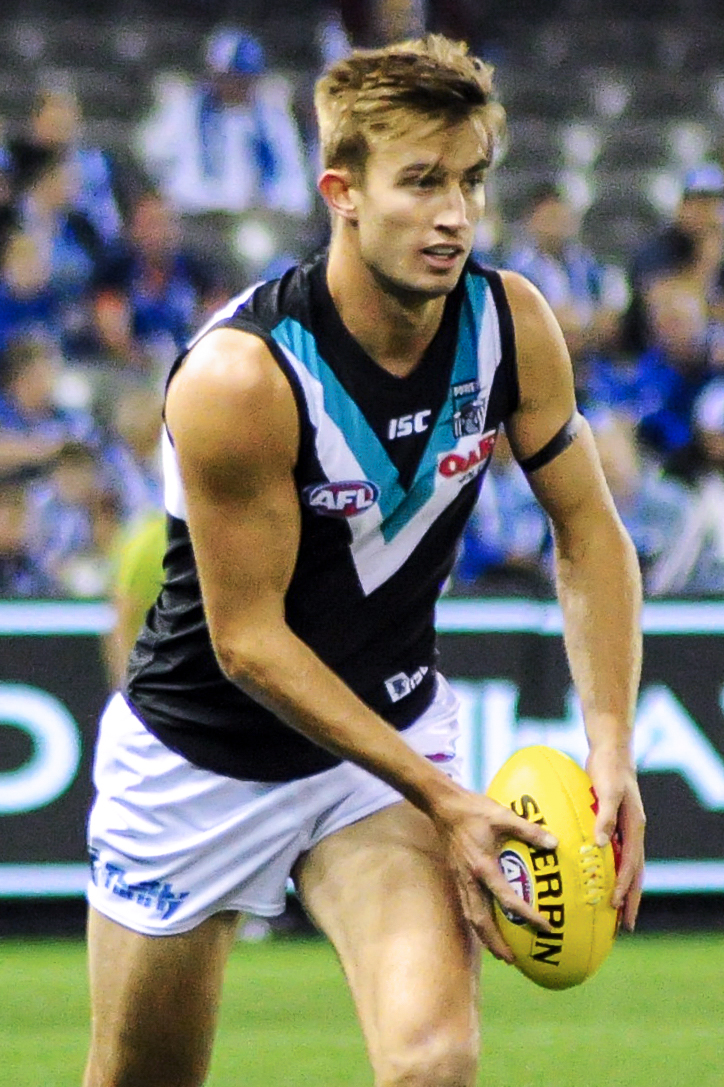
- Howard playing in 2018 for Port Adelaide

Personal information
- Born: 25 March 1996 (age 30); Wagga Wagga, New South Wales
- Original team: Murray Bushrangers (TAC Cup)/Wagga Tigers (NSW)
- Draft: No. 56, 2014 national draft
- Height: 199 cm (6 ft 6 in)
- Weight: 95 kg (209 lb)
- Position: Key defender

Playing career^{1}
Years	Club	Games (Goals)
2015–2019	Port Adelaide	45 (14)
2020–2026	St Kilda	100(1)
Total		145 (15)
- ^{1} Playing statistics correct to the end of round 22, 2026.

Dougal Howard (born 25 March 1996) is a former professional Australian rules footballer who most recently played for the St Kilda Football Club in the Australian Football League (AFL). Formerly playing for Port Adelaide, which recruited him with pick 56 in the 2014 national draft, he was traded to St Kilda at the end of the 2019 season.

== Early life and junior football ==
Howard was born and raised in Wagga Wagga, New South Wales and he played his junior football with the East Wagga Kooringal club. As a teenager he moved to Albury to study at university where he played with the Murray Bushrangers and attracted the interest of AFL scouts.

== AFL career ==
=== Port Adelaide ===
Howard made his debut in the first Showdown of the 2016 AFL season at Adelaide Oval. Howard played only three games until an anterior cruciate ligament injury ended his season prematurely.

Howard played 20 games in the 2018 AFL season, only missing two games with a broken hand. He played some impressive shut-down jobs on the league's best forwards and lead the competition for one-percenters with 230. He signed a three-year contract extension with Port Adelaide until the end of 2022. In 2019, Howard captained Port Adelaide in the club's round 9, 38-point win against Gold Coast at Adelaide Oval. After the game, coach Ken Hinkley said of Howard that "we absolutely believe that Dougal's an emerging leader of our football club ... We saw an occasional mistake, we saw some really impressive stuff, we saw a willingness to take the game on – that's what you want from a young leader, that's not to let it burden him."

=== St Kilda ===
At the conclusion of the 2019 AFL season, Howard requested a trade to St Kilda. The trade was finalised on 15 October and Howard was traded to St Kilda along with Port teammate Paddy Ryder and pick 10 and a 2020 fourth-round selection, in return for the Saints' picks 12 and 18 and a 2020 third-round selection. Howard also attracted attention from North Melbourne and Essendon but ultimately chose St Kilda. Before moving to the Saints, Howard was told at his exit interview that Port saw his future as a forward rather than a defender. A week after the exit interview, Port Adelaide list manager Jason Cripps suggested that a trade could be an option for Howard, who ultimately explored his options and eventually requested a move to St Kilda.

Howard played every game in defence in his first season at St Kilda, which ultimately resulted in the club's first finals berth since 2011. He was subsequently named St Kilda's vice-captain ahead of the 2021 AFL season.

In round 2 of the 2021 season, Howard was one of the best in the Saints' loss to Melbourne, collecting 29 disposals, eight marks, nine intercept possessions, nine rebound 50s, four score involvements and gained 769 metres (most on ground).Howard finished seventh in the Trevor Barker Award in 2021.

Howard announced his retirement at the end of the 2026 season, having struggled with injury and fallen out of favour, only managing 10 games across his final two seasons.

== Statistics ==
Updated to the end of round 22, 2026.

Legend
G	Goals	K	Kicks	D	Disposals	T	Tackles
B	Behinds	H	Handballs	M	Marks

Season	Team	No.	Games	Totals							Averages (per game)							Votes
Season	Team	No.	Games	G	B	K	H	D	M	T	G	B	K	H	D	M	T	Votes
2016	Port Adelaide	32	6	3	4	30	20	50	14	17	0.5	0.7	5.0	3.3	8.3	2.3	2.8	0
2017	Port Adelaide	32	4	1	0	43	12	55	27	3	0.3	0.0	10.8	3.0	13.8	6.8	0.8	0
2018	Port Adelaide	32	20	0	0	158	60	218	87	29	0.0	0.0	7.9	3.0	10.9	4.4	1.5	0
2019	Port Adelaide	32	15	10	6	114	60	174	67	22	0.7	0.4	7.6	4.0	11.6	4.5	1.5	0
2020 (Note: The 2020 season was played with 17 home-and-away matches per team (down from 22) and 16-minute quarters with time on (down from 20-minute quarters with time on) due to the impact of the COVID-19 pandemic.)	St Kilda	20	19	1	1	160	38	198	76	23	0.1	0.1	8.4	2.0	10.4	4.0	1.2	0
2021	St Kilda	20	21	0	1	256	68	324	102	25	0.0	0.0	12.2	3.2	15.4	4.9	1.2	0
2022	St Kilda	20	17	0	0	153	48	201	83	16	0.0	0.0	9.0	2.8	11.8	4.9	0.9	0
2023	St Kilda	20	18	0	1	150	81	231	99	15	0.0	0.1	8.3	4.5	12.8	5.5	0.8	0
2024	St Kilda	20	15	0	0	117	55	172	97	10	0.0	0.0	7.8	3.7	11.5	6.5	0.7	0
2025	St Kilda	20	3	0	0	25	8	33	19	7	0.0	0.0	8.3	2.7	11.0	6.3	2.3	0
2026	St Kilda	20	6	0	0	58	14	72	42	1	0.0	0.0	9.7	2.3	12.0	7.0	0.2	0
Career			144	15	13	1264	464	1728	713	168	0.1	0.1	8.8	3.2	12.0	5.0	1.2	0
