= Simon Lethlean =

Australian football manager (born 1975)

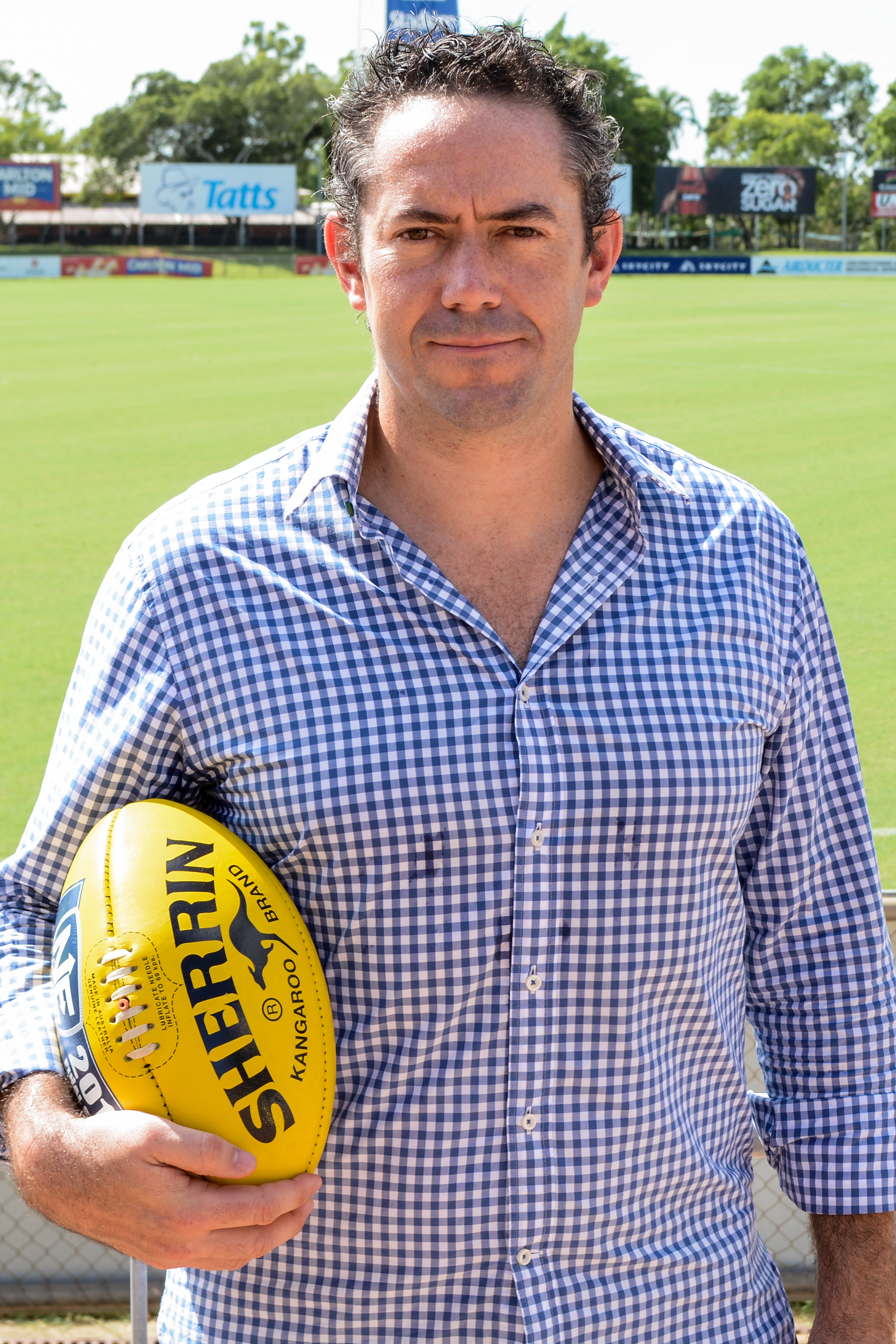
- Lethlean in February 2016
- Born: Simon Lethlean; 17 November 1975 (age 50)
- Education: Camberwell Grammar; Monash University; Melbourne University
- Occupation: St Kilda Football Club CEO
- Known for: Australian Football League executive

Simon Lethlean (born 17 November 1975) is a former Australian Football League (AFL) football operations manager and the former CEO of the St Kilda Football Club.

== Career ==
Previously working as a commercial solicitor, Lethlean began working for the AFL in 2004. He worked across various roles at the league, where he was involved in the legal department, broadcasting, fixturing, and game development. As general manager of game development at the league he was involved in the creation of the AFL Women's league, and oversaw its inaugural season.

In March 2017, AFL CEO Gillon McLachlan announced that Lethlean would be replacing outgoing football operations manager Mark Evans, who was taking on the CEO position at Gold Coast Football Club. Lethlean retained his role in running the AFL Women's competition.

In July 2017 following media reports of "inappropriate relationships" within AFL headquarters, McLachlan announced that Lethlean had resigned from his position within the league. It emerged that Lethlean had been involved in an extra-marital relationship with a younger female staff member from the AFL's New South Wales office. The relationship had begun a year earlier in August 2016, but had ended prior to Lethlean taking on the football operations role. He also resigned from his position as a director of statistics company Champion Data, which is part owned by the league.

Following his departure from the AFL, it was reported that Lethlean was seeking a CEO position at an AFL club. He had been linked to chief executive openings at Collingwood, Carlton, and Hawthorn, and later to the head of football department role at Essendon, but in December 2017 it was announced that he would become general manager of football at the St Kilda Football Club from the beginning of 2018. The role became vacant following a restructure caused by the departure of Saints chief operating officer Ameet Bains. Lethlean became St Kilda's CEO in 2022.

== Playing/coaching career ==
Lethlean played for the Hawthorn reserves side, playing in 40 games during the 1990s before later playing for the Old Xaverians, where he was involved in five premierships. He went on to captain the Victorian Amateur Football Association (VAFA) representative team. Lethlean later returned to the Old Xaverians as coach, winning premierships again in 2009 and 2010. He also coached the VAFA representative side to six wins from six games.

== Personal life ==
Lethlean attended Camberwell Grammar and studied law through the University of Melbourne's Sports Law Program. He previously completed a Bachelor of Commerce and Bachelor of Laws through Monash University. He is married and has four children.
