= Nick Hind =

Australian rules footballer (born 1994)

Personal information
- Full name: Nicholas Hind
- Born: 19 August 1994 (age 32); Clunes, Victoria
- Original team: Essendon (VFL) / East Point / Keilor
- Draft: No. 54, 2018 national draft
- Height: 180 cm (5 ft 11 in)
- Weight: 78 kg (172 lb)
- Position: Defender, Forward

Playing career
Years	Club	Games (Goals)
2019–2020	St Kilda	21 (17)
2021–2024	Essendon	74 (15)
Total		95 (32)

Nick Hind (born 19 August 1994) is a former professional Australian rules footballer who played for the St Kilda Football Club and Essendon Football Club in the Australian Football League (AFL). He was selected by St. Kilda with pick 54 in the 2018 national draft.

== AFL career ==
Hind made his senior debut against Gold Coast in round 13 of the 2019 AFL season.

At the conclusion of the 2020 AFL season, he was traded to Essendon, the club he once represented in the Victorian Football League (VFL). After 74 games for Essendon between 2021 and 2024, Hind was delisted by the club.

== Personal life ==
Born and raised in Clunes, Victoria, not far from Ballarat, Hind's family owned the National Hotel, a pub in Clunes. Hannah McGuire, who was murdered in 2024, was Nick Hind's cousin.

== Statistics ==
Legend
G	Goals	K	Kicks	D	Disposals	T	Tackles
B	Behinds	H	Handballs	M	Marks

Season	Team	No.	Games	Totals							Averages (per game)							Votes
Season	Team	No.	Games	G	B	K	H	D	M	T	G	B	K	H	D	M	T	Votes
2019	St Kilda	40	11	11	10	86	34	120	22	21	1.0	0.9	7.8	3.1	10.9	2.0	1.9	0
2020 (Note: The 2020 season was played with 17 home-and-away matches per team (down from 22) and 16-minute quarters with time on (down from 20-minute quarters with time on) due to the impact of the COVID-19 pandemic.)	St Kilda	40	10	6	5	56	42	98	17	28	0.6	0.5	5.6	4.2	9.8	1.7	2.8	2
2021	Essendon	19	22	4	2	365	127	492	114	45	0.2	0.1	16.6	5.8	22.4	5.2	2.0	0
2022	Essendon	19	21	2	6	338	91	429	93	37	0.1	0.3	16.1	4.3	20.4	4.4	1.8	1
2023	Essendon	19	16	3	1	220	71	291	68	24	0.2	0.1	13.8	4.4	18.2	4.3	1.5	0
2024	Essendon	19	15	6	4	130	44	174	37	29	0.4	0.3	8.7	2.9	11.6	2.5	1.9	0
2025	Essendon	19	0	—	—	—	—	—	—	—	—	—	—	—	—	—	—	0
Career			95	32	28	1195	409	1604	351	184	0.3	0.3	12.6	4.3	16.9	3.7	1.9	3
