= Nick Coffield =

Australian rules footballer

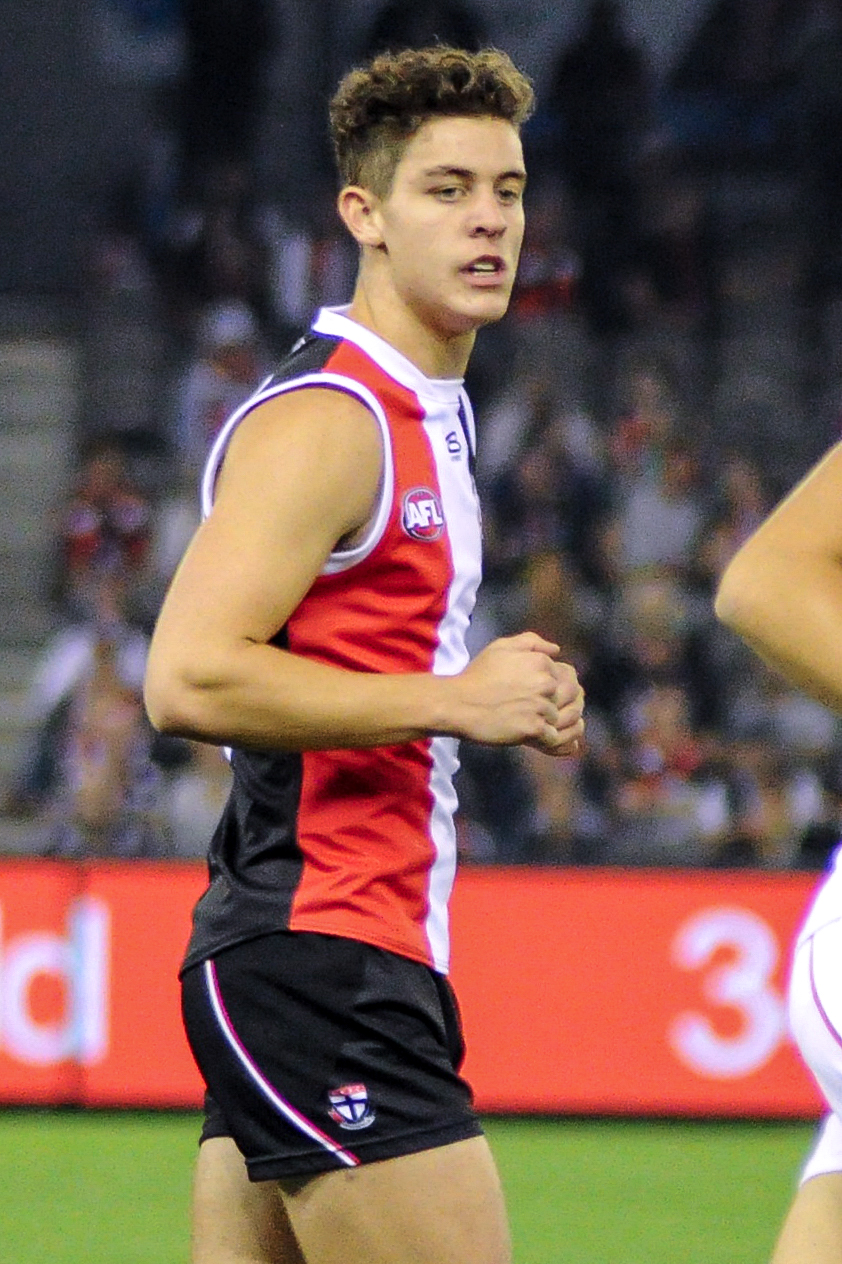
- Coffield playing for St Kilda in April 2018

Personal information
- Full name: Nicholas John Coffield
- Born: 23 October 1999 (age 27)
- Original team: Eltham Football Club Northern Knights (TAC Cup)
- Draft: No. 8, 2017 national draft
- Debut: Round 3, 2018, St Kilda vs. Adelaide, at Etihad Stadium
- Height: 191 cm (6 ft 3 in)
- Weight: 82 kg (181 lb)
- Position: Defender / midfielder

Club information
- Current club: Western Bulldogs
- Number: 17

Playing career^{1}
Years	Club	Games (Goals)
2018–2023	St Kilda	52 (2)
2024–	Western Bulldogs	25 (0)
Total		75 (2)
- ^{1} Playing statistics correct to the end of round 22, 2026.

Career highlights
- VFL premiership player: 2025

Nicholas John Coffield (born 23 October 1999) is a professional Australian rules footballer playing for the Western Bulldogs in the Australian Football League (AFL). He was drafted by St Kilda with their second selection and eighth overall in the 2017 national draft.

== Early life ==
Coffield captained his school football side and the Northern Knights when he was 18. He also had a standout national carnival representing Vic Metro in the TAC Cup, earning All-Australian selection in his final year of junior footy.

== AFL career ==
Coffield made his debut in the forty-nine point loss to Adelaide at Etihad Stadium in round three of the 2018 season. In April 2018, Coffield and fellow 2017 draftee Hunter Clark extended their contracts with St Kilda until the end of 2021. He ultimately managed 10 games in his debut season, averaging slightly less than 15 disposals at an average of 85% efficiency, the fourth highest average for St Kilda in 2018.

Coffield played nearly all of the first half of the 2019 season in St Kilda's VFL affiliate Sandringham, before playing his first senior AFL game in Round 11 against Port Adelaide in Shanghai. Overall, he played 8 games in the 2019 Season. His season ended early after suffering a dislocated shoulder in St Kilda's Round 21 match against Fremantle.

Coffield is currently studying a Bachelor of Arts/Commerce at Deakin University.

2020 was a breakout year for Coffield, with the defender playing every game for the season with the exception of Round 1, plus two finals, playing 18 of a possible 19 games in a COVID-interrupted season. Despite the shortened season and quarters, Coffield established himself a prominent defender who averaged over 15 disposals and six marks a game. Coffield finished the regular season with a team high 100 marks from 16 games, as well as finished first at the Saints for intercept marks and total intercepts. He was also equal second for rebound-50s and effective disposals. Coffield's form was rewarded an interchange position in the AFL's 22Under22 side.

Coffield's 2021 season reflected his team's, an inconsistent year that didn't reach the heights of the previous. Coffield also found himself in and out of the side, playing 16 of a possible 22 games including missing three due to a hamstring injury. He did however have a strong performance against Richmond in Round five, collecting 23 disposals and 12 marks and a good game against Fremantle in Round 23 where he had 21 disposals and seven marks.

Coffield was traded to the Western Bulldogs following the 2023 AFL season.

Coffield made his debut for the Western Bulldogs in round 1 of the 2024 AFL season against Melbourne at the Melbourne Cricket Ground.

== Statistics ==
Updated to the end of round 22, 2026.

Legend
G	Goals	K	Kicks	D	Disposals	T	Tackles
B	Behinds	H	Handballs	M	Marks

Season	Team	No.	Games	Totals							Averages (per game)							Votes
Season	Team	No.	Games	G	B	K	H	D	M	T	G	B	K	H	D	M	T	Votes
2018	St Kilda	33	10	1	0	86	62	148	46	14	0.1	0.0	8.6	6.2	14.8	4.6	1.4	0
2019	St Kilda	1	8	0	0	80	39	119	46	9	0.0	0.0	10.0	4.9	14.9	5.8	1.1	0
2020 (Note: The 2020 season was played with 17 home-and-away matches per team (down from 22) and 16-minute quarters with time on (down from 20-minute quarters with time on) due to the impact of the COVID-19 pandemic.)	St Kilda	1	18	0	0	180	93	273	118	17	0.0	0.0	10.0	5.2	15.2	6.6	0.9	0
2021	St Kilda	1	16	1	1	159	69	228	89	25	0.1	0.1	9.9	4.3	14.3	5.6	1.6	0
2022	St Kilda	1	0	—	—	—	—	—	—	—	—	—	—	—	—	—	—	0
2023	St Kilda	1	0	—	—	—	—	—	—	—	—	—	—	—	—	—	—	0
2024	Western Bulldogs	17	8	0	0	58	21	79	34	6	0.0	0.0	7.3	2.6	9.9	4.3	0.8	0
2025	Western Bulldogs	17	4	0	0	31	20	51	27	4	0.0	0.0	7.8	5.0	12.8	6.8	1.0	0
2026	Western Bulldogs	17	13	0	0	130	55	185	76	20	0.0	0.0	10.0	4.2	14.2	5.8	1.5	0
Career			77	2	1	724	359	1083	436	95	0.0	0.0	9.4	4.7	14.1	5.7	1.2	0
