= Josh Bruce =

Australian rules footballer

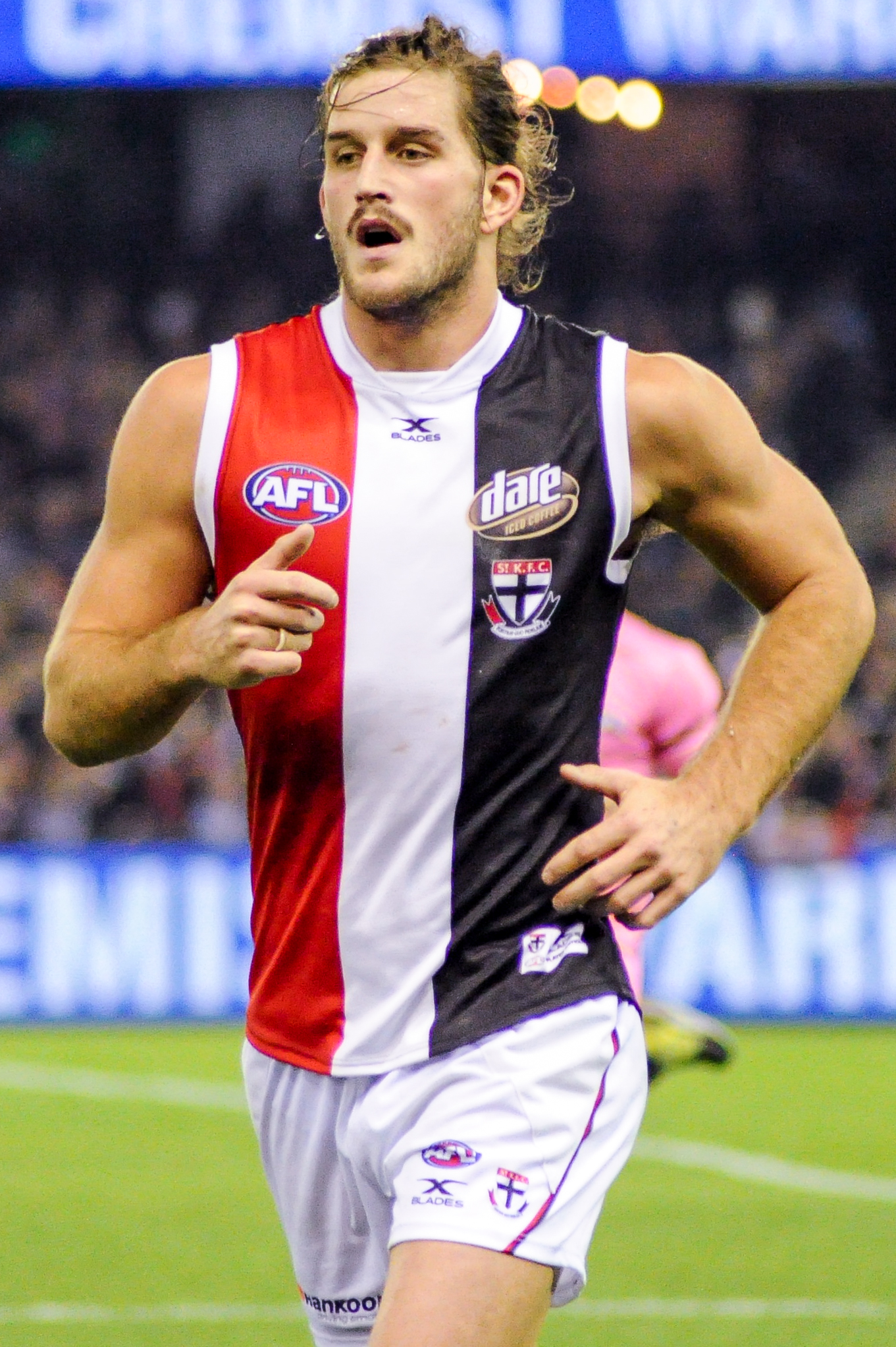
- Bruce playing for St Kilda in 2017

Personal information
- Full name: Joshua Bruce
- Nickname: Babie Jabie
- Born: 8 June 1992 (age 34); Canberra, Australian Capital Territory
- Debut: Round 5, 2012, Greater Western Sydney vs. Western Bulldogs, at Manuka Oval
- Height: 197 cm (6 ft 6 in)
- Weight: 102 kg (225 lb)
- Position: Key forward

Playing career^{1}
| Years | Club | Games (Goals) |
| 2012–2013 | Greater Western Sydney | 14 (3) |
| 2014–2019 | St Kilda | 99 (168) |
| 2020–2023 | Western Bulldogs | 50 (63) |
| Total | | 163 (234) |
- ^{1} Playing statistics correct to the end of the 2023 season.

Career highlights
- St Kilda leading goalkicker: 2015; Western Bulldogs leading goalkicker: 2021

Joshua Bruce (born 8 June 1992) is a former professional Australian rules footballer who last played for the Western Bulldogs in the Australian Football League (AFL) and currently serving as a development coach for the Bulldogs' AFLW team. He previously played for the Greater Western Sydney Giants between 2012 and 2013 and the St Kilda Saints between 2014 and 2019. Bruce was St Kilda's leading goalkicker in 2015 and the Western Bulldogs' leading goalkicker in 2021.

== Early life ==
Bruce was born in Canberra, Australian Capital Territory and attended St Edmund's College and Canberra Grammar School. His older brother, Aaron, was rookie-listed by Sydney in 2008. Bruce played junior football for the Eastlake Football Club in the AFL Canberra competition. Greater Western Sydney drafted Bruce as an ACT zone selection to play with their TAC Cup team in 2010. He continued to play with the Giants in 2011 while the club was competing in the North East Australian Football League (NEAFL).

== AFL career ==
=== Greater Western Sydney (2012–2013) ===
Bruce made his debut in round 5, 2012 against the Western Bulldogs at Manuka Oval, in his home territory, as a late replacement for the injured Chad Cornes. Bruce played just the three games in his debut season, kicking two goals. Bruce played in eleven games for just the one win in 2013, playing mostly as a key defender. At the end of 2013, Bruce was traded to St Kilda.

=== St Kilda (2014–2019) ===
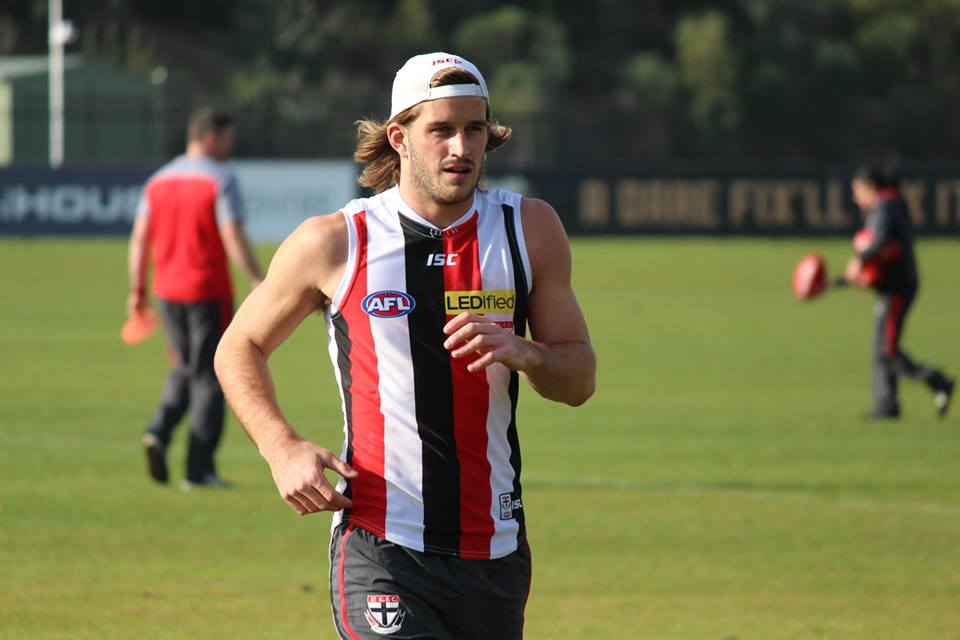
Bruce at training in June 2015

Bruce played his first game for St Kilda in round 5, 2014 against Essendon. While quiet initially, he was tried as a forward in round 19 against Gold Coast. After a three-goal display, his next pre-season was spent training with the forwards. In 2015, he had a break-out year up forward, playing in all 22 games, and kicking a six-goal haul against Gold Coast and five-goal displays against Essendon (twice) and Adelaide. He went on to become St Kilda's leading goalkicker for 2015, kicking 50 goals and finishing eighth in that year's Coleman Medal tally. Bruce had a similarly consistent year in 2016; though he kicked less goals for the year, this still included another five-goal haul against Essendon. Bruce's output dropped slightly in the first half of the 2017 season, and he was dropped for the first time since 2014, having played every game in 2015–2016. Upon his return to the senior team, he kicked four goals against Adelaide and had an improved finish to the year.

At the conclusion of the 2019 season Bruce requested a trade to the Western Bulldogs. He was traded on 16 October.

=== Western Bulldogs (2020–2023) ===
After a mediocre 2020 AFL season, Bruce stamped his credentials as one of the competition's menacing key forwards when he kicked 10 goals against North Melbourne in the 3rd round of the 2021 AFL season. Bruce enjoyed a consistent year in 2021, kicking 48 goals in 20 matches before his season was cut short by an ACL rupture. On the 22nd of August 2023, Bruce announced his retirement effective immediately.

== Statistics ==
Statistics are correct to the end of round 3 2021.

Legend
| G | Goals | K | Kicks | D | Disposals | T | Tackles |
| B | Behinds | H | Handballs | M | Marks |

| Season | Team | No. | Games | Totals | | | | | | | Averages (per game) | | | | | | |
| Season | Team | No. | Games | G | B | K | H | D | M | T | G | B | K | H | D | M | T |
|---|---|---|---|---|---|---|---|---|---|---|---|---|---|---|---|---|---|
| 2012 | Greater Western Sydney | 47 | 3 | 2 | 1 | 16 | 17 | 33 | 12 | 2 | 0.7 | 0.3 | 5.3 | 5.7 | 11.0 | 4.0 | 0.7 |
| 2013 | Greater Western Sydney | 47 | 11 | 1 | 0 | 85 | 47 | 132 | 46 | 27 | 0.1 | 0.0 | 7.7 | 4.3 | 12.0 | 4.2 | 2.5 |
| 2014 | St Kilda | 27 | 10 | 4 | 1 | 69 | 45 | 114 | 45 | 16 | 0.4 | 0.1 | 6.9 | 4.5 | 11.4 | 4.5 | 1.6 |
| 2015 | St Kilda | 27 | 22 | 50 | 24 | 165 | 75 | 240 | 110 | 56 | 2.3 | 1.1 | 7.5 | 3.4 | 10.9 | 5.0 | 2.5 |
| 2016 | St Kilda | 27 | 22 | 38 | 22 | 127 | 106 | 233 | 100 | 59 | 1.7 | 1.0 | 5.8 | 4.8 | 10.6 | 4.5 | 2.7 |
| 2017 | St Kilda | 27 | 20 | 36 | 27 | 143 | 94 | 237 | 104 | 41 | 1.8 | 1.4 | 7.2 | 4.7 | 11.9 | 5.2 | 2.1 |
| 2018 | St Kilda | 27 | 3 | 4 | 0 | 13 | 22 | 35 | 12 | 7 | 1.3 | 0.0 | 4.3 | 7.3 | 11.6 | 4.0 | 2.3 |
| 2019 | St Kilda | 27 | 22 | 36 | 20 | 151 | 109 | 260 | 96 | 40 | 1.6 | 0.9 | 6.7 | 5.0 | 11.8 | 4.4 | 1.8 |
| 2020 (Note: The 2020 season was played with 17 home-and-away matches per team (down from 22) and 16-minute quarters with time on (down from 20-minute quarters with time on) due to the impact of the COVID-19 pandemic.) | Western Bulldogs | 17 | 17 | 14 | 8 | 55 | 81 | 136 | 47 | 28 | 0.8 | 3.2 | 4.8 | 8.0 | 12.8 | 1.6 | 2.5 |
| 2021 | Western Bulldogs | 17 | 20 | 48 | 21 | 138 | 28 | 221 | 100 | 26 | 4.7 | 0.7 | 11.3 | 3.7 | 15.0 | 8.7 | 1.0 |
| Career | | | 133 | 199 | 105 | 858 | 607 | 1465 | 598 | 278 | 1.5 | 0.8 | 6.5 | 4.6 | 11.0 | 4.5 | 2.1 |

== Honours and achievements ==
Brownlow Medal votes
| Season | Votes |
| 2012 | 0 |
| 2013 | 0 |
| 2014 | 0 |
| 2015 | 4 |
| 2016 | 1 |
| 2017 | 0 |
| Total | 5 |

- Individual
  - St Kilda leading goalkicker: 2015
  - Western Bulldogs leading goalkicker: 2021

== Coaching ==
Bruce was appointed as the development coach of the Bulldogs' AFLW team in October 2021.
