= Lewis Pierce =

Australian rules footballer (born 1994)

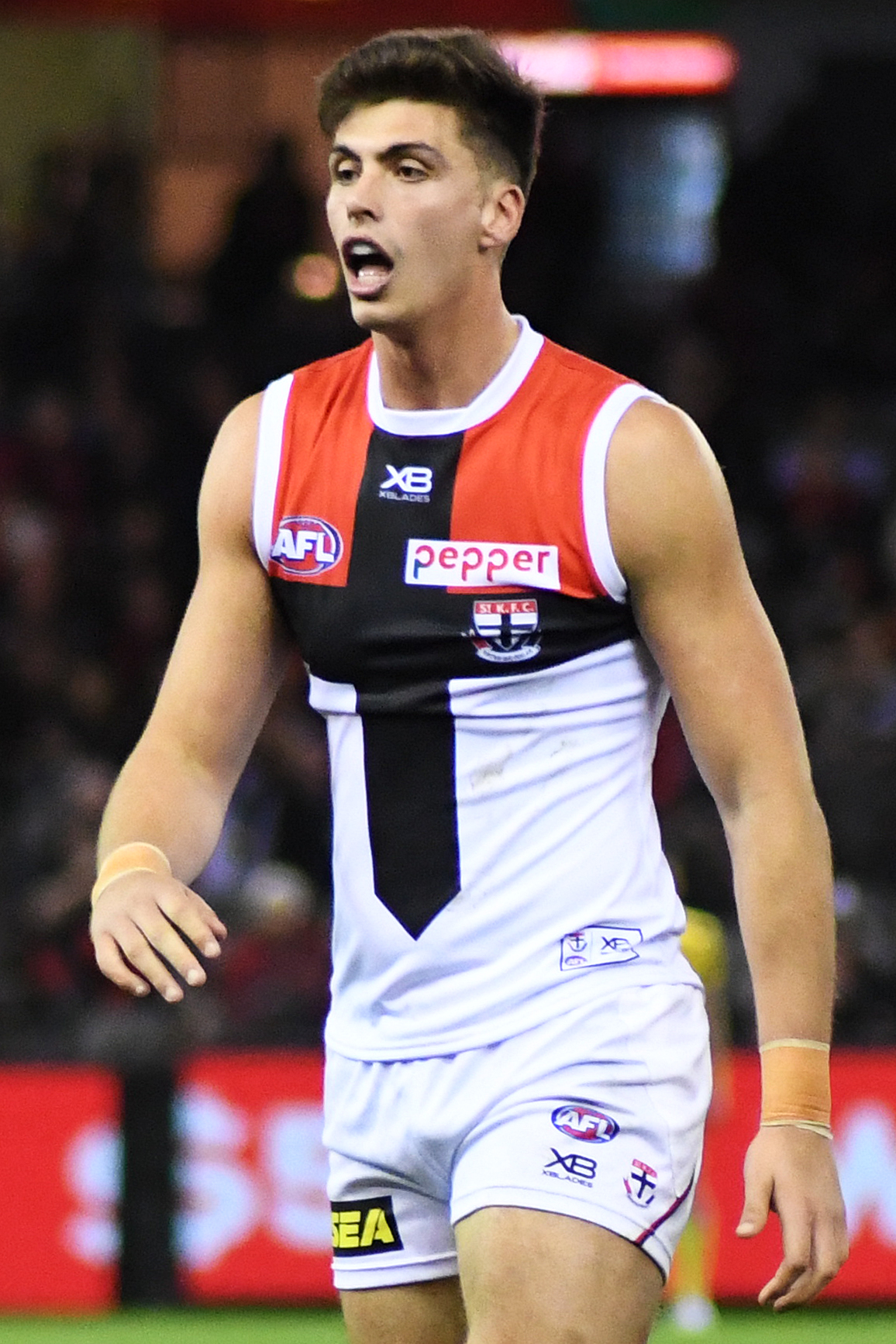
- Pierce playing for St Kilda in August 2018

Personal information
- Full name: Lewis Pierce
- Born: 16 November 1994 (age 31)
- Original team: Dandenong Stingrays (TAC Cup)
- Draft: No. 75, 2012 AFL national draft
- Height: 202 cm (6 ft 8 in)
- Weight: 88 kg (194 lb)
- Position: Ruckman

Club information
- Current club: St Kilda
- Number: 42

Playing career^{1}
Years	Club	Games (Goals)
2013–2019	St Kilda	5 (1)
- ^{1} Playing statistics correct to the end of 2019.

Lewis Pierce (born 16 November 1994) is an Australian rules footballer who played for the St Kilda Football Club in the Australian Football League (AFL). He played his first game in round 12 of the 2016 season against Carlton. He was delisted at the conclusion of the 2017 season but was redrafted by St Kilda in the rookie draft. He was again delisted at the end of the 2019 season.
