= Ed Phillips (footballer) =

Australian rules footballer

Personal information
- Full name: Edward Phillips
- Born: 29 March 1998 (age 28)
- Original teams: Oakleigh Chargers (TAC Cup), Caulfield Grammar School (APS)
- Draft: No. 56, 2016 national draft
- Debut: Round 8, 2018, St Kilda vs. Fremantle, at Optus Stadium
- Height: 187 cm (6 ft 2 in)
- Weight: 80 kg (176 lb)
- Position: Midfielder

Playing career^{1}
Years	Club	Games (Goals)
2017–2020	St Kilda	15 (4)
- ^{1} Playing statistics correct to the end of 2020.

Edward Phillips (born 29 March 1998) is a former professional Australian rules footballer who played for the St Kilda Football Club in the Australian Football League (AFL). He was drafted by St Kilda with their third selection and 56th overall in the 2016 national draft. He made his debut in the thirty point loss to Fremantle at Optus Stadium in round 8 of the 2018 season. In four years with the Saints, Phillips was unable to cement a permanent spot in the side. He was delisted at the end of the 2020 season.
