= Doulton Langlands =

Australian rules footballer (born 1999)

Personal information
- Born: 29 July 1999 (age 27)
- Original team: Murray Bushrangers
- Draft: No. 8 in the 2018 Rookie draft
- Debut: 21 July 2019, St Kilda vs. Western Bulldogs, at Docklands
- Height: 187 cm (6 ft 2 in)
- Weight: 83 kg (183 lb)

Club information
- Current club: St Kilda
- Number: 46

Playing career^{1}
Years	Club	Games (Goals)
2019-2020	St Kilda	3 (2)
- ^{1} Playing statistics correct to the end of 2020.

Doulton Langlands (born 29 July 1999) is an Australian rules footballer who played for the St Kilda Football Club in the Australian Football League (AFL). He was selected at pick #8 in the 2018 Rookie draft.

== Early life ==
Langlands was raised in Albury and played junior football with the North Albury Football Club and also represented the Murray Bushrangers. He was recruited by AFL club St Kilda at No. 8 in the 2018 Rookie draft.

== AFL career ==
Langlands' 2019 pre season was interrupted by a concussion and hamstring tendon injury. He made his senior debut against Western Bulldogs in round 13 of the 2019 season. Langlands ultimately played three games in 2019 before he was sidelined again by a groin injury. He managed two goals from these games. Following the 2019 season, Langlands signed a one-year contract extension to remain on St Kilda's rookie list in 2020.

At the beginning of the 2020 pre season, Langlands came 2nd in St Kilda's 3km time trial, beating his previous personal best by 40 seconds.

At the conclusion of the 2020 premiership season, Langlands was delisted by the St Kilda Football Club. In 2021 he moved to Western Australia to play for Perth in the West Australian Football League (WAFL).
