= Brandon White =

Australian rules footballer

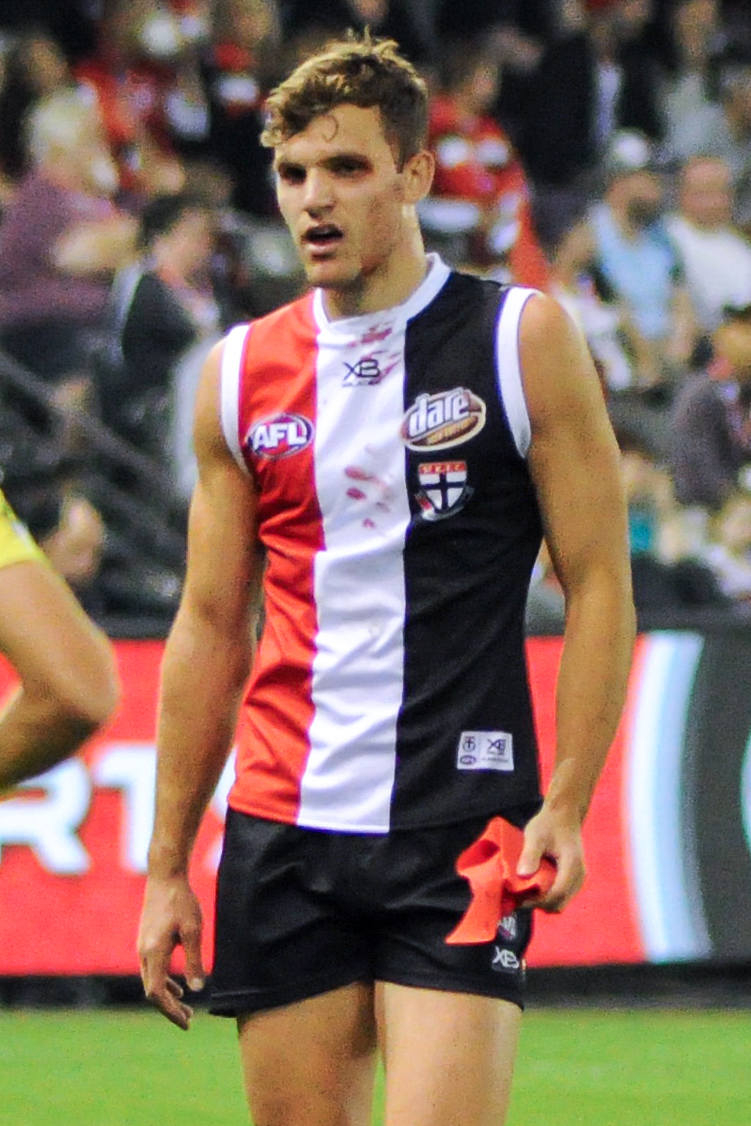
- White playing for St Kilda in April 2018

Personal information
- Full name: Brandon White
- Born: 13 January 1997 (age 29)
- Original team: Beaconsfield/Dandenong Stingrays (TAC Cup)
- Draft: No. 40, 2015 national draft
- Debut: Round 23, 2016, St Kilda vs. Brisbane Lions, at Etihad Stadium
- Height: 189 cm (6 ft 2 in)
- Weight: 88 kg (194 lb)
- Position: Defender

Playing career^{1}
Years	Club	Games (Goals)
2015–2019	St Kilda	11 (1)
- ^{1} Playing statistics correct to the end of 2019.

Brandon White (born 13 January 1997) is a former Australian rules footballer who played for the St Kilda Football Club in the Australian Football League (AFL).

He was drafted by St Kilda with their second selection and fortieth overall in the 2015 national draft. He made his debut in the fifty-eight point win against the Brisbane Lions in round 23, 2016 at Etihad Stadium. He was delisted at the conclusion of the 2019 AFL season.
