= David Armitage (footballer) =

Australian rules footballer

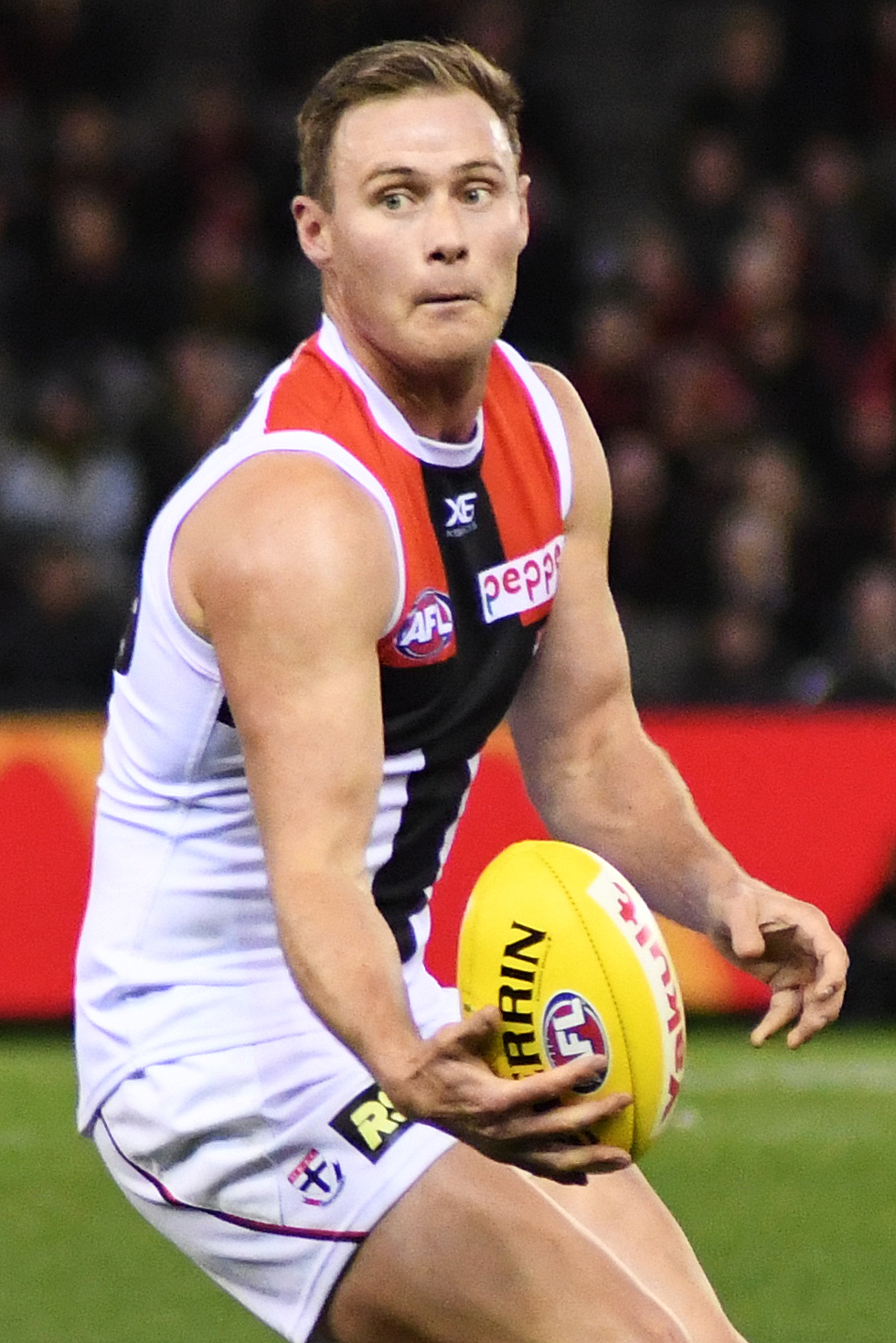
- Armitage playing for St Kilda in August 2018

Personal information
- Full name: David Clancy Armitage
- Born: 16 June 1988 (age 38); Mackay, Queensland
- Original team: Morningside (QAFL)
- Draft: No. 9, 2006 National Draft, St Kilda
- Height: 183 cm (6 ft 0 in)
- Weight: 84 kg (185 lb)

Playing career^{1}
Years	Club	Games (Goals)
2007–2019	St Kilda	169 (98)
- ^{1} Playing statistics correct to the end of 2019.

David Clancy Armitage (born 16 June 1988) is a former Australian rules footballer who played for the St Kilda Football Club in the Australian Football League (AFL).

== Early life and junior football ==
Armitage was born in Mackay, Queensland. His father, Greg, was an avid Australian rules fan and introduced David to the game at a young age. By the age of 5 David played his junior football for the Eastern Swans in the AFL Mackay competition. He made his senior debut for the Swans in 2002 at 14 years old and kicked five goals against Bakers Creek. In 2005, at the age of 16, he made the decision to move to Brisbane and play for Morningside in the hope of increasing his chances of getting drafted to an AFL club. While at Morningside, he represented the under 18s Queensland team several times and played alongside future AFL players Courtenay Dempsey and Lee Spurr. He also competed in the 2005 QAFL Grand Final. The decision paid off as he was drafted to St Kilda with the 9th pick in the 2006 AFL draft.

== AFL career ==
Armitage made his AFL debut in Round 8, 2007 against Hawthorn. He played in St Kilda’s 2008 NAB Cup winning side, the club's third preseason cup win. He played in three of 22 matches in the 2009 season's home and away rounds in which St Kilda qualified in first position for the finals series, winning the club’s third minor premiership. He became a regular player in St Kilda's midfield from the 2011 season.

After his 2014 season had been interrupted by injury, Armitage planned with St Kilda coach Alan Richardon and committed to shedding excess muscle to re-design himself as a player, modeling himself after Hawthorn premiership player Jordan Lewis. In 2015 pre-season training he emphasized his running rather than his weight-lifting and shed five kilograms of weight, which led to a major improvement in his game, and he enjoyed career-best form in the 2015 season. He played almost every game of the season for St Kilda, in August he was one of the top five in the AFL for possessions, and he filled in as captain for three games in the absence of Nick Riewoldt. Already contracted until for 2016, he signed a three-year contract extension to stay at the club until the end of 2019. He finished off the season having played 21 out of 22 games for St Kilda and came second in the Trevor Barker Award, St Kilda's best and fairest, as well as polling 12 votes in the Brownlow Medal.

In 2017 Armitage struggled with a groin injury, which required surgery and sidelined him from all but 2 of St Kilda's matches for the year. His final years at the club were hampered by injury and he finished the 2019 season on the sidelines due to concussion. He retired at the end of the 2019 season.

== Statistics ==
Statistics are correct to end of 2019

Legend
G	Goals	K	Kicks	D	Disposals	T	Tackles
B	Behinds	H	Handballs	M	Marks

Season	Team	No.	Games	Totals							Averages (per game)						
Season	Team	No.	Games	G	B	K	H	D	M	T	G	B	K	H	D	M	T
2007	St Kilda	20	3	0	0	11	9	20	7	7	0.0	0.0	3.7	3.0	6.7	2.3	2.3
2008	St Kilda	20	13	10	6	77	56	133	39	43	0.8	0.5	5.9	4.3	10.2	3.0	3.3
2009	St Kilda	20	3	3	1	30	17	47	9	26	1.0	0.3	10.0	5.7	15.7	3.0	8.7
2010	St Kilda	20	9	4	2	64	77	141	29	50	0.4	0.2	7.1	8.6	15.7	3.2	5.6
2011	St Kilda	20	22	12	12	180	156	336	63	99	0.5	0.5	8.2	7.1	15.3	2.9	4.5
2012	St Kilda	20	21	17	8	275	151	426	100	98	0.8	0.4	13.1	7.2	20.3	4.8	4.7
2013	St Kilda	20	21	10	10	248	209	457	71	115	0.5	0.5	11.8	10.0	21.8	3.4	5.5
2014	St Kilda	20	15	11	6	176	154	330	59	67	0.7	0.4	11.7	10.3	22.0	3.9	4.5
2015	St Kilda	20	21	11	12	282	315	597	83	125	0.5	0.7	13.4	15.0	28.4	4.0	6.0
2016	St Kilda	20	22	11	2	214	264	478	78	125	0.5	0.1	9.7	12.0	21.7	3.6	5.7
2017	St Kilda	20	2	1	1	18	15	33	9	8	0.5	0.5	9.0	7.5	16.5	4.5	4.0
2018	St Kilda	20	15	8	11	152	147	299	70	43	0.5	0.7	10.1	9.8	19.9	4.7	2.9
2019	St Kilda	20	2	0	0	20	13	33	8	6	0.0	0.0	10.0	6.5	16.5	4.0	3.0
Career			169	98	71	1747	1583	3330	625	812	0.6	0.4	10.3	9.3	19.7	3.7	4.8
