= Aaron Hamill =

Australian rules footballer

Personal information
- Born: 20 August 1977 (age 49)
- Original team: Tuggeranong (ACTFL)
- Debut: Round 15, 13 July 1996, Carlton vs. Adelaide, at Optus Oval
- Height: 184 cm (6 ft 0 in)
- Weight: 94 kg (207 lb)

Playing career^{1}
Years	Club	Games (Goals)
1996–2000	Carlton	92 (114)
2001–2006	St Kilda	98 (125)
Total		190 (239)
- ^{1} Playing statistics correct to the end of 2007.

Career highlights
- Carlton pre-season cup winning side 1997; St Kilda Football Club captain 2005; 3rd in Trevor Barker Award 2001; St Kilda pre-season cup winning side 2004

Aaron Hamill (born 20 August 1977) is a former professional Australian rules footballer, who is best known for his time at the St Kilda Football Club in the Australian Football League (AFL) when he briefly captained the club. He also played five seasons with Carlton.

== Early life ==
Having played rugby league, rugby union and basketball as a junior, Hamill first played Australian rules football in the Australian Capital Territory for the Tuggeranong Football Club. He attended Fadden Primary School, Marist College, Melrose High School and Phillip College (now Canberra College). He went to Melrose High School with Essendon and Richmond player Justin Blumfield.

== Playing career ==
=== Carlton ===
Hamill was recruited late in the 1994 AFL draft, with the 79th overall pick. Making his senior debut in 1996 with the Carlton Blues, Hamill was a favourite among supporters for his strong marking and goalkicking. He was a key part of the Blues 1997 pre-season premiership side and was also part of Carlton's runner up team in 1999. He played with Carlton from 1996 to 2000 with 92 games and 114 goals. At the end of the 2000 season, he was traded to St Kilda, after having an argument with Carlton president John Elliott.

=== St Kilda ===
At the end of 2000 he moved to St Kilda, among other big name signings, such as Fraser Gehrig and Steven Lawrence.

He was named captain of the Saints for the 2003 season and his influence for the team was unquestionable. He had a tough, uncompromising style, always committing himself to the contest. As a result, he sustained many injuries over his career, and midway through 2005 he missed a large part of the season with an assortment of hip, shoulder, and knee injuries. Due to the same array of injuries, he missed the entire 2007 season. Doctors advised Hamill that he should retire from the game due to the toll it takes on his body. Although he had the desire to continue, many coaches and medicos told him he was unable to continue. After seeking a trade mid season, he decided to retire, closing the book on an illustrious career at both Carlton and St Kilda.

Hamill played with St Kilda from 2001 until 2006 for a total of 98 games and 125 goals.

=== Retirement ===
On 3 October 2007, Hamill announced his retirement from AFL football.

Hamill played 190 AFL matches with Carlton and St Kilda. In a career crippled by injury towards the end, he was remembered for his uncompromising attack on the football. He was a member of preseason premiership sides at both clubs. Hamill made the following statement on his retirement from his playing career:

"The decision to retire has been one of the hardest to make in my football career. However, I felt it was in the best interest of the club moving forward", Hamill said. "This will now allow a younger player to step up and cement themselves in the St Kilda side ... I would like to thank my family and close friends for their support over the journey. I am grateful to the Carlton Football Club for providing me with the opportunity to play and develop as a footballer", he said. "Their inspirational leaders taught me to crave success and dedication to a cause, which will stay with me forever. I would also like to express my gratitude to Grant Thomas whose efforts did not go unnoticed by the playing group during his six years as coach. I wish Ross Lyon and the St Kilda Football Club all the best moving forward and hope that the current playing group will achieve the ultimate success."

St Kilda Football Club senior coach Ross Lyon reflected on Hamill's contribution to the club. "Aaron is a tremendously respected figure and he has played a significant role in getting this team to where it stands today. We all wish him the best in his retirement as he prepares for life after footy."

== Coaching career ==
=== St Kilda Football Club ===
Following his retirement, Hamill took on coaching roles. In December 2011, he returned to St Kilda as the forward-line assistant coach for the 2012 season. Over ten years with the club, He was St Kilda assistant coach under senior coaches Scott Watters, Alan Richardson and Brett Ratten during his tenure as Santis assistant coach, he later served as senior coach of the club's VFL-affiliate Sandringham from 2018 to 2019, and became the club's senior assistant coach in 2020. He then departed St Kilda at the end of the 2021 season.

=== Carlton Football Club ===
Hamill was appointed backline assistant coach at Carlton under senior coach Michael Voss for the 2022 season.

In February 2022, Hamill made a statement on his role as assistant coach at Carlton Football Club by stating "We want to be able to put in a great system in front of them and an environment which ‘Vossy’ and us as coaches are facilitating. We feel we’re on the right path".

Hamill departed the Carlton Football Club at the end of the 2025 AFL season.

== Career statistics ==
- Games: 190
- Goals: 239
- Brownlow Medal: 22 career votes

== Honours ==
- Third in St Kilda's best and fairest 2001
- St Kilda AFL WHL Cup winning side 2004
- Carlton pre-season premiership side 1997
- St Kilda captain 2003
