= Bailey Rice (Australian footballer) =

American football player

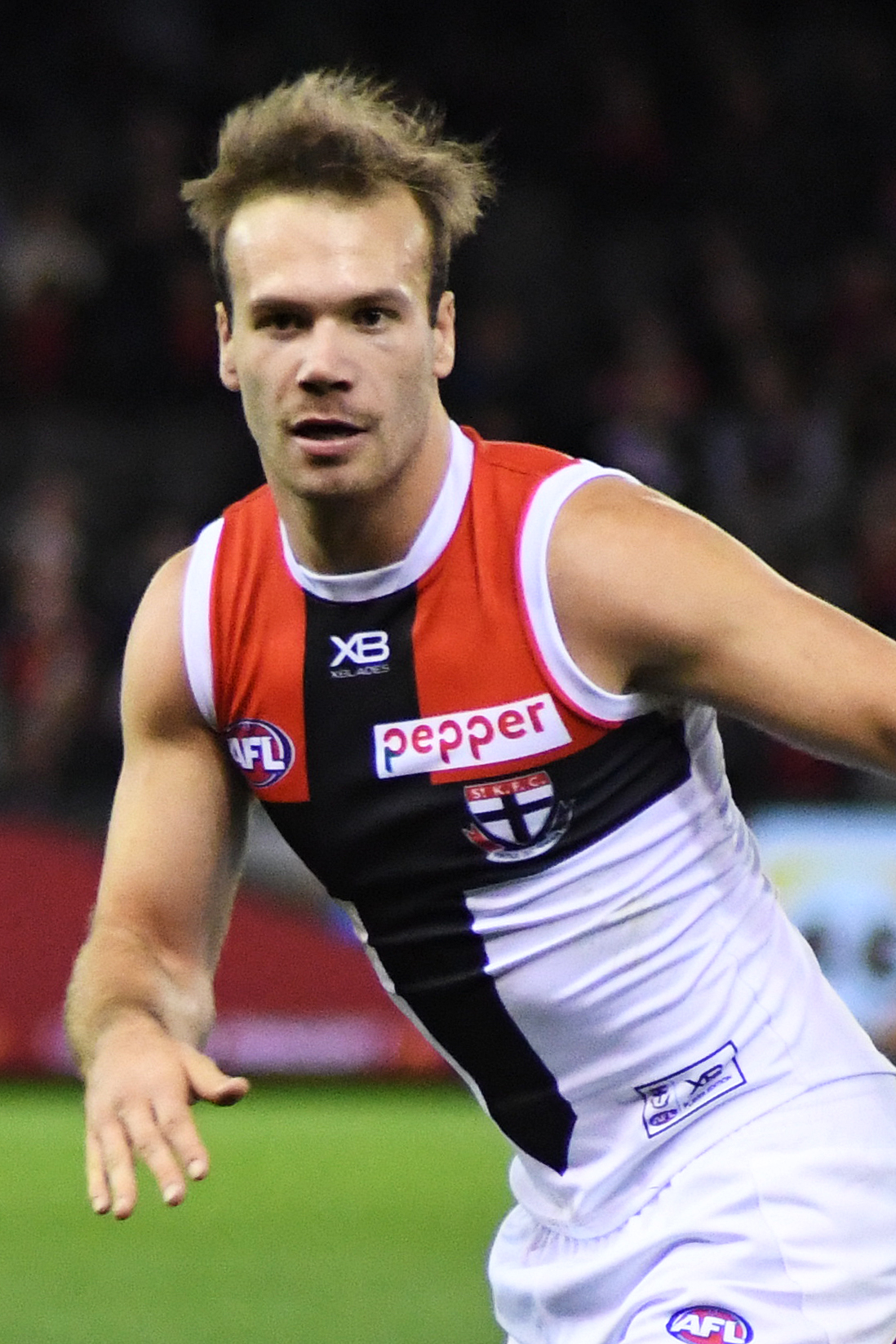
- Rice playing for St Kilda in August 2018
- Born: 10 February 1997 (age 29); Melbourne, Australia
- Football career

No. 37 – Charlotte 49ers
- Position: Punter
- Class: Freshman

Personal information
- Listed height: 6 ft 1 in (1.85 m)
- Listed weight: 205 lb (93 kg)

Career information
- High school: Hallam Senior College (Hallam, Australia)
- College: Charlotte (2021–present)
Australian rules football career
Personal information
- Original team: Dandenong Stingrays
- Draft: No. 49, 2015 national draft
- Height: 184 cm (6 ft 0 in)
- Weight: 83 kg (183 lb)
- Position: Defender
Playing career^{1}
Years	Club	Games (Goals)
2018–2019	St Kilda	11 (0)
- ^{1} Playing statistics correct to the end of 2019.

Bailey Rice (born 10 February 1997) is a college football punter and former Australian rules footballer who plays for the Charlotte 49ers.

He was selected by St Kilda at pick #49 in the 2015 national draft as a father-son selection, with St Kilda matching a bid from Richmond. Carlton had put in a father-son bid for Rice who had nominated St Kilda as his preferred club. He made his senior debut against Collingwood in round 9 of the 2018 season. He was delisted at the conclusion of the 2019 AFL season.

In 2021, Rice switched to American football, accepting a collegiate scholarship with the Charlotte 49ers after a stint with Australian training outfit The Punt Factory.

Rice is the son of Dean Rice who played for St Kilda and Carlton.
