= Hunter Clark =

Australian rules footballer

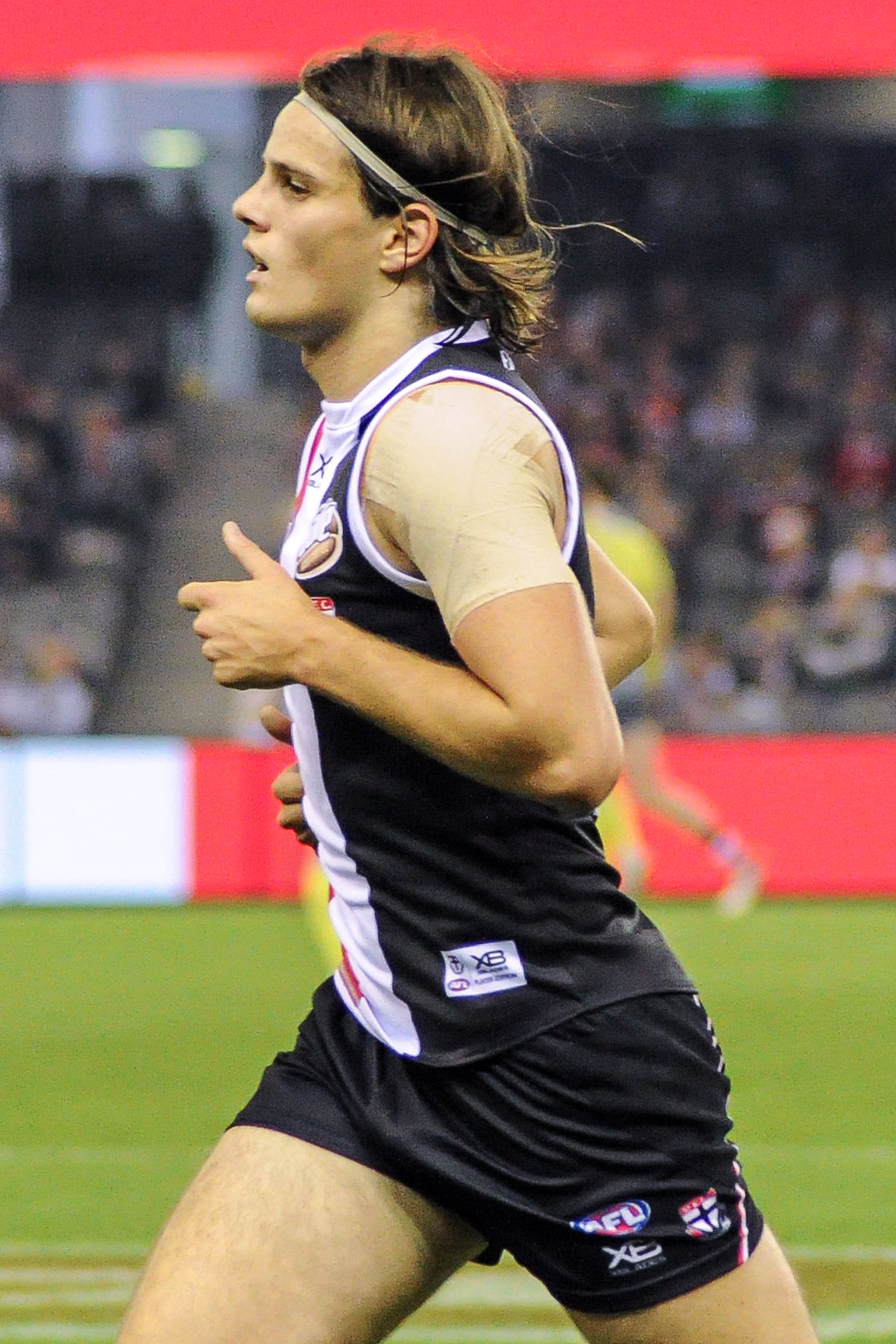
- Clark playing for St Kilda in April 2018

Personal information
- Nickname: Huntzy
- Born: 26 March 1999 (age 27); Melbourne Australia
- Original team: Dandenong Stingrays (TAC Cup)
- Draft: No. 7, 2017 national draft
- Debut: Round 1, 2018, St Kilda vs. Brisbane Lions, at Etihad Stadium
- Height: 186 cm (6 ft 1 in)
- Weight: 79 kg (174 lb)
- Position: Midfielder

Club information
- Current club: St Kilda
- Number: 11

Playing career^{1}
Years	Club	Games (Goals)
2018–	St Kilda	118 (14)
- ^{1} Playing statistics correct to the end of round 22, 2026.

Career highlights
- AFL Rising Star nominee: 2018; 22under22 team: 2020

Hunter Clark (born 26 March 1999) is a professional Australian rules footballer with the St Kilda Football Club in the Australian Football League (AFL). He was drafted by St Kilda with their first selection and seventh overall in the 2017 national draft.

== Early life ==
Clark is from Mount Martha on the Mornington Peninsula and played junior football with the Mount Martha Football Club. As a boy, Clark was fascinated by jungle animals and wildlife. Clark was also a budding saxophone player as a youngster, but ultimately opted for a career in football. Clark attended Padua College with fellow footballer Tom De Koning.

== AFL career ==
Clark made his debut in the twenty-five point win against the Brisbane Lions at Etihad Stadium in the opening round of the 2018 season. In round 13 of the 2018 season, Clark was nominated for the AFL Rising Star after a 17-disposal performance in St Kilda's win against Gold Coast. He ultimately played 15 games in his debut season.

The 2019 season began quietly for Clark who was left out of the senior side for the first two rounds due to form. Clark played rounds three and four, before being dropped again for two games and making a return in round seven. Clark was dropped for rounds 8–12, but returned in round 13 and played every game until the end of the season. In the second half of the season, Clark had improved considerably and averaged 20 disposals, five marks and four intercepts a game. Two standout games came in round 17 against Geelong where he had 25 disposals and laid nine tackles, and round 18 against the Bulldogs where he had 26 disposals, three clearances and two goals.

In a COVID-interrupted 2020 season, Clark played largely across half-back but spent increased time in the midfield late in the season. He played 18 of a possible 19 matches for the year, including two finals. Clark was instrumental late in the game to help the Saints defeat the Suns by 4 points in round 10. Clark was one of the best players afield against the win over ladder leaders Port Adelaide in round eight, with a game-high 24 disposals and five rebounds. Clark was selected at half-back in the AFL's 22Under22, a fan-voted award where the AFL's best 22 players under the age of 22 are recognised annually. Clark also finished top three for his team in disposals in the regular season, as well as ground-ball-gets.

Clark had an injury-affected 2021 year, managing only 13 games from a possible 22. Clark suffered multiple jaw fractures in a round 13 game against Adelaide and required surgery to repair the damage. Clark returned in Round 20 to face Carlton, but suffered a concussion in that game. The concussion ultimately ruled Clark out for the remainder of the season. Despite the frustrating season, Clark had some standout performances, in particular a 33 disposal game against Richmond in Round five, and a 26 disposal two goal and six tackle performance against Hawthorn in Round seven.

== Statistics ==
Updated to the end of round 22, 2026.

Legend
G	Goals	K	Kicks	D	Disposals	T	Tackles
B	Behinds	H	Handballs	M	Marks

Season	Team	No.	Games	Totals							Averages (per game)							Votes
Season	Team	No.	Games	G	B	K	H	D	M	T	G	B	K	H	D	M	T	Votes
2018	St Kilda	11	15	3	4	121	110	231	43	42	0.2	0.3	8.1	7.3	15.4	2.9	2.8	0
2019	St Kilda	11	14	2	4	153	134	287	64	43	0.1	0.3	10.9	9.6	20.5	4.6	3.1	0
2020 (Note: The 2020 season was played with 17 home-and-away matches per team (down from 22) and 16-minute quarters with time on (down from 20-minute quarters with time on) due to the impact of the COVID-19 pandemic.)	St Kilda	11	18	1	1	189	122	311	64	46	0.1	0.1	10.5	6.8	17.3	3.6	2.6	0
2021	St Kilda	11	13	2	1	154	95	249	53	40	0.2	0.1	11.8	7.3	19.2	4.1	3.1	0
2022	St Kilda	11	8	0	0	82	39	121	22	17	0.0	0.0	10.3	4.9	15.1	2.8	2.1	0
2023	St Kilda	11	19	4	2	185	161	346	54	68	0.2	0.1	9.7	8.5	18.2	2.8	3.6	0
2024	St Kilda	11	11	1	2	132	80	212	30	46	0.1	0.2	12.0	7.3	19.3	2.7	4.2	0
2025	St Kilda	11	13	1	4	113	90	203	44	55	0.1	0.3	8.7	6.9	15.6	3.4	4.2	0
2026	St Kilda	11	7	0	0	63	36	99	28	16	0.0	0.0	9.0	5.1	14.1	4.0	2.3	0
Career			118	14	18	1192	867	2059	402	373	0.1	0.2	10.1	7.3	17.4	3.4	3.2	0
