= 2023 St Kilda Football Club season =

125th St Kilda Football Club season

St Kilda Football Club
2023 season
- President: Andrew Bassat
- Coach: Ross Lyon
- Captain: Jack Steele
- Home ground: Marvel Stadium
- Pre-season: 1–0–1
- Home and away season: 6th
- Finals series: Elimination-finalist (Lost 11.11 (77) to 15.11 (101) vs Greater Western Sydney, 2nd Elimination Final)
- Leading goalkicker: Jack Higgins (36 goals)
- Highest home attendance: 69,255 (1 April vs Essendon, Round 3)
- Lowest home attendance: 18,279 (23 July vs North Melbourne, Round 19)
- Average home attendance: 33,045
- Club membership: 60,239

The 2023 St Kilda Football Club season was the 125th competing in the VFL/AFL and 139th in the club's history. Coached by Ross Lyon and captained by Jack Steele, they are competed in the AFL's 2023 Premiership Season. The season also celebrated the club's 150th anniversary since their establishment in 1873.

== Squad information ==
=== Playing and coaching staff list ===
The playing squad and coaching staff of the St Kilda Football Club for the 2023 AFL season.

Senior list		Rookie list	Coaching staff
1 Nick Coffield; 3 Zak Jones; 4 Jade Gresham; 5 Brad Crouch; 6 Sebastian Ross; 7 Nasiah Wanganeen-Milera; 8 Bradley Hill; 9 Jack Steele (c); 10 Mitch Owens; 11 Hunter Clark; 12 Max King; 13 Ryan Byrnes; 15 Jack Billings; 16 Dan Butler; 17 Marcus Windhager; 19 Rowan Marshall; 20 Dougal Howard (vc); 21 Zaine Cordy	22 Jack Higgins; 23 Jack Bytel; 25 Mattaes Phillipou; 26 Josh Battle; 27 Oscar Adams; 28 Tim Membrey (vc); 29 Jimmy Webster; 30 Matthew Allison; 31 James Van Es; 33 Ben Paton; 34 Tom Highmore; 35 Jack Sinclair; 36 Daniel McKenzie; 37 Leo Connolly; 38 Tom Campbell; 39 Olli Hotton; 40 Isaac Keeler; 44 Callum Wilkie (vc)	14 Liam Stocker; 18 Jack Hayes; 32 Mason Wood; 41 Angus McLennan (B); 42 Max Heath; 43 Cooper Sharman; 45 Jack Peris (B); 47 Anthony Caminiti	Head coach: Ross Lyon; Assistant coaches: Corey Enright (defence); Lenny Hayes (midfield); Robert Harvey (forwards); Damian Carroll (head of development & learning); Jake Batchelor (VFL coach/development); Brendon Goddard (development coach); Legend: (c) Captain(s); (vc) Vice-captain(s); (B) Category B rookie; italics - Inactive player list; Updated: 28 September 2026; Source(s):

== Squad changes ==
=== Retirements and delistings ===
Player	Method	Career games	Career goals	Ref.
Jarryn Geary	Retired	207	34	
Dan Hannebery	Retired	208 (Sydney), 18 (St Kilda)	100	
Darragh Joyce	Delisted	13	0	
Dean Kent	Retired	100 (37 St Kilda, 63 Melbourne)	91	
Josiah Kyle	Retired	0	0	
Jarrod Lienert	Delisted	34 (St Kilda 11, Port Adelaide 23)	1	

=== Trade period ===
Clubs involved	Trade		Ref
Gold Coast St Kilda	to Gold Coast (from St Kilda): Ben Long; 2023 fourth round pick (St Kilda)	to St Kilda (from Gold Coast): pick #32	

=== Free agency ===
2022 AFL free agency period signings
Player	Free agent type	Recruited from	Compensation	Ref
Zaine Cordy	Unrestricted	Western Bulldogs	None ^{[a]}	

=== National Draft ===
Round	Pick	Player	Recruited from		Notes
Round	Pick	Player	Club	League	Notes
1	10	Mattaes Phillipou	Woodville-West Torrens	SANFL	
2	31	James Van Es	Greater Western Victoria Rebels	NAB League	
2	35	Olli Hotton	Sandringham Dragons	NAB League	←Gold Coast←Fremantle (2021)
3	44	Isaac Keeler	North Adelaide	SANFL	

=== Category B rookie selections ===
Player	Recruited from		Notes
Player	Club	League	Notes
Angus McLennan	Sandringham Dragons	NAB League	Next Generation Academy selection (Born in Egypt)

=== Pre-season supplemental selection period ===
Player	Recruited from		Notes
Player	Club	League	Notes
Liam Stocker	Carlton	AFL	
Anthony Caminiti	Northern Knights	NAB League	

=== Coaching staff changes ===
Position	New	Replaced	Ref.
Coach	Ross Lyon	Brett Ratten	
Assistant Coach (Forwards)	Robert Harvey	Brendon Lade	
Assistant Coach (Midfield)	Lenny Hayes	Ben McGlynn	
Development Coach	Brendon Goddard	Nil	
Executive General Manager of Football	Geoff Walsh	Nil	
Executive General Manager of Football	David Misson	Geoff Walsh	

== Pre-season ==
24 February 2023; 16:00 AEDT (UTC+11:00)	St Kilda	46–105	Melbourne	RSEA Park, Melbourne
	2.1 (13); 2.3 (15); 5.8 (38); 6.10 (46)	Report	3.3 (21); 8.6 (54); 10.7 (67); 16.9 (105)	Attendance: ≈5,000
		Goals
	Phillipou 2, Byrnes, Cordy, Steele, Windhager		Petracca 3, Pickett 3, Brown 2, Gawn 2, Chandler, Grundy, Hunter, McDonald, Neal-Bullen, Rivers

3 March 2023; 16:10 AEDT (UTC+11:00)	St Kilda	67–32	Essendon	RSEA Park, Melbourne
	0.2 (2); 6.2 (38); 9.2 (56); 10.7 (67)	Report	1.6 (12); 1.7 (13); 2.13 (25); 3.14 (32)	Attendance: ≈8,000; Umpires: Curtis Deboy, Daniel Johanson, Nathan Toner, Jordan Fry
		Goals
	Owens 3, Higgins 3, Butler, Marshall, Phillipou, Wood		Davey Jnr, Durham, Wright
		Bests
	Crouch, Owens, Marshall, Wood, Wanganeen-Milera		Ridley, McGrath, Setterfield, Merrett, Davey Jnr

== Premiership season ==
=== League table ===
Pos	Team	Pld	W	L	D	PF	PA	PP	Pts	Qualification
1	Collingwood (P)	23	18	5	0	2142	1687	127.0	72	Finals series
2	Brisbane Lions	23	17	6	0	2180	1771	123.1	68	Finals series
3	Port Adelaide	23	17	6	0	2149	1906	112.7	68	Finals series
4	Melbourne	23	16	7	0	2079	1660	125.2	64	Finals series
5	Carlton	23	13	9	1	1922	1697	113.3	54	Finals series
6	St Kilda	23	13	10	0	1775	1647	107.8	52	Finals series
7	Greater Western Sydney	23	13	10	0	2018	1885	107.1	52	Finals series
8	Sydney	23	12	10	1	2050	1863	110.0	50	Finals series
9	Western Bulldogs	23	12	11	0	1919	1766	108.7	48	
10	Adelaide	23	11	12	0	2193	1877	116.8	44	
11	Essendon	23	11	12	0	1838	2050	89.7	44	
12	Geelong	23	10	12	1	2088	1855	112.6	42	
13	Richmond	23	10	12	1	1856	1983	93.6	42	
14	Fremantle	23	10	13	0	1835	1898	96.7	40	
15	Gold Coast	23	9	14	0	1839	2006	91.7	36	
16	Hawthorn	23	7	16	0	1686	2101	80.2	28	
17	North Melbourne	23	3	20	0	1657	2318	71.5	12	
18	West Coast	23	3	20	0	1418	2674	53.0	12	

Source: afl.com.au
Rules for classification: 1) points; 2) percentage; 3) number of points for
(P) Premiers

=== Result by round ===
Round	1	2	3	4	5	6	7	8	9	10	11	12	13	14	15	16	17	18	19	20	21	22	23	24
Ground	H	A	H	H	N	A	H	A	A	A	H	–	A	A	H	A	H	A	H	A	H	H	H	A
Result	W	W	W	W	L	W	L	W	L	W	L	B	W	L	L	W	L	L	W	W	L	W	W	L
Position	5	2	1	1	1	1	3	3	5	5	5	5	5	5	5	5	6	6	6	5	7	6	6	6

Updated to match(es) played on 21 August 2023. Source: Australian Football League
A = Away; H = Home; N = Neutral; B = Bye; W = Win; D = Draw; L = Loss

=== Matches ===
1 19 March 2023; 16:40 AEDT (UTC+11:00)	St Kilda	67–52	Fremantle	Marvel Stadium, Melbourne
	3.3 (21); 5.4 (34); 6.6 (42); 10.7 (67)	Report	2.1 (13); 5.4 (34); 7.6 (48); 7.10 (52)	Attendance: 23,429; Umpires: Daniel Johanson, Curtis Deboy, Nathan Toner, Simon Meredith
		Goals
	Gresham 2, Owens 2, Wood 2, Bytel, Cordy, Higgins, Phillipou		Schultz 2, Aish, Frederick, Switkowski, Taberner, Treacy
		Bests
	Sinclair, Crouch, Steele, Wilkie, Wood, Byrnes		Cox, Young, Ryan, Clark, Henry, Schultz

2 25 March 2023; 19:25 AEDT (UTC+11:00)	Western Bulldogs	41–92	St Kilda	Marvel Stadium, Melbourne
	0.1 (1); 4.5 (29); 5.8 (38); 5.11 (41)	Report	4.1 (25); 5.4 (34); 11.5 (71); 14.8 (92)	Attendance: 33,294; Umpires: Matt Stevic, Nick Foot, John Howorth, Jamie Broadbent
		Goals
	Naughton 2, Garcia, English, Baker		Phillipou 3, Owens 3, Gresham 2, Cordy 2, Caminiti 2, Wood, Steele
		Bests
	English, Smith, Crozier, Liberatore, Bontempelli		Steele, Sinclair, Owens, Crouch, Marshall, Wood, Phillipou

3 1 April 2023; 19:25 AEDT (UTC+11:00)	St Kilda	92–74	Essendon	Melbourne Cricket Ground, Melbourne
	5.4 (34); 7.5 (47); 9.7 (61); 14.8 (92)	Report	1.1 (7); 4.5 (29); 6.6 (42); 11.8 (74)	Attendance: 69,255; Umpires: John Howorth, Eleni Tee, Jamie Broadbent, Matt Stevic
		Goals
	Higgins 4, Butler 4, Wood, Owens, Caminiti, Gresham, Windhager, Hill		Perkins 2, Caldwell 2, Shiel 2, Langford, Stringer, Menzie, Martin, Parish
		Bests
	Wood, Wilkie, Marshall, Ross, Crouch, Higgins		Kelly, Ridley, Parish, Merrett, Shiel, Martin

4 8 April 2023; 19:30 AEST (UTC+10:00)	St Kilda	113–60	Gold Coast	Marvel Stadium, Melbourne
	3.2 (20); 8.6 (54); 13.10 (88); 17.11 (113)	Report	3.4 (22); 4.8 (32); 5.11 (41); 8.12 (60)	Attendance: 21,049; Umpires: Nicholas Brown, Mathew Nicholls, Jamie Broadbent, Cameron Dore
		Goals
	Higgins 5, Hill 2, Caminiti 2, Owens 2, Windhager, Sinclair, Ross, Phillipou, Cordy, Butler		Rosas, King, Jeffrey, Casboult, Anderson, Ainsworth, Sexton, Holman
		Bests
	Owens, Hill, Higgins, Sinclair, Marshall, Wilkie, Crouch		Anderson, Miller, Powell, Collins, Ainsworth

5 16 April 2023; 19:25 ACST (UTC+09:30)	Collingwood	70–64	St Kilda	Adelaide Oval, Adelaide
	2.2 (14); 4.4 (28); 6.10 (46); 10.10 (70)	Report	2.2 (14); 4.3 (27); 6.4 (40); 9.10 (64)	Attendance: 43,796; Umpires: Leigh Fisher, Jamie Broadbent, Robert Findlay, Brent Wallace
		Goals
	Hill 3, Mihocek 2, McCreery, Mitchell, Ginnivan, Johnson, Elliott		Caminiti 2, Higgins 2, Crouch 2, Phillipou, Clark, Byrnes
		Bests
	N.Daicos, Moore, Hill, J.Daicos, Maynard, Mitchell		Wilkie, Crouch, Battle, Sinclair, Marshall, Wood, Ross

6 23 April 2023; 15:20 AEST (UTC+10:00)	Carlton	60–82	St Kilda	Marvel Stadium, Melbourne
	3.4 (22); 6.7 (43); 7.10 (52); 8.12 (60)	Report	3.2 (20); 6.3 (39); 11.7 (73); 12.10 (82)	Attendance: 45,770; Umpires: Alex Whetton, Simon Meredith, Nathan Williamson, Nathan Toner
		Goals
	C.Curnow 3, Silvagni 2, McKay, Durdin, Cerra		Butler 3, Owens 2, Wood, Membrey, Marshall, Higgins, Gresham, Cordy, Clark
		Bests
	Cripps, McKay, Newman, Cerra, Walsh, C.Curnow		Gresham, Sinclair, Butler, Owens, Marshall, Wood

7 28 April 2023; 19:50 AEST (UTC+10:00)	St Kilda	76–83	Port Adelaide	Marvel Stadium, Melbourne
	5.2 (32); 5.6 (36); 8.8 (56); 11.10 (76)	Report	2.2 (14); 6.7 (43); 9.10 (64); 12.11 (83)	Attendance: 25,845; Umpires: Daniel Johanson, Matt Stevic, Brendan Hosking, Brent Wallace
		Goals
	Owens 2, Gresham 2, Higgins, Cordy, Membrey, Wood, Butler, Steele, Clark		Rioli 2, Powell-Pepper 2, Dixon 2, Finlayson 2, Duursma, Boak, Houston, McEntee
		Bests
	Steele, Sinclair, Marshall, Wanganeen-Milera, Wilkie		Horne-Francis, Boak, Butters, Houston, Powell-Pepper

8 7 May 2023; 16:40 AEST (UTC+10:00)	North Melbourne	34–64	St Kilda	Marvel Stadium, Melbourne
	0.4 (4); 0.7 (7); 3.7 (25); 4.10 (34)	Report	1.6 (12); 3.9 (27); 6.15 (51); 8.16 (64)	Attendance: 22,065; Umpires: Leigh Fisher, Jeff Dalgleish, Nicholas Brown, Nicholas McGinness
		Goals
	Larkey 3, Stephenson		Butler 2, Higgins 2, Sinclair, Sharman, Owens, Wood
		Bests
	Ziebell, McKay, Sheezel, Goldstein, Shiels		Wilkie, Steele, Clark, Owens, Marshall, Hill

9 14 May 2023; 12:40 ACST (UTC+09:30)	Adelaide	121–69	St Kilda	Adelaide Oval, Adelaide
	6.2 (38); 10.2 (62); 15.6 (96); 19.7 (121)	Report	1.1(7); 5.5 (35); 7.7 (49); 10.9 (69)	Attendance: 33,805; Umpires: Nick Foot, Matt Stevic, Robert O'Gorman, Andrew Heffernan
		Goals
	Walker 5, Rankine 2, Pedlar 2, Fogarty 2, Smith, Thilthorpe, Jones, Rachele, Soligo, Keays, Murphy, McHenry		Higgins 3, Caminiti 2, Wood 2, Butler, Byrnes, Membrey
		Bests
	Dawson, Smith, Walker, Milera, Soligo, Pedlar		Crouch, Marshall, Steele, Wood, Higgins, Clark

10 21 May 2023; 16:40 AEST (UTC+10:00)	Greater Western Sydney	80–92	St Kilda	GIANTS Stadium, Sydney
	4.1 (25); 8.3 (51); 11.4 (70); 12.8 (80)	Report	3.3 (25); 8.3 (51); 11.7 (73); 13.14 (92)	Attendance: 7,508; Umpires: Leigh Haussen, Alex Whetton, Nicholas McGinness, James Strybos
		Goals
	Hogan 2, Greene 2, Daniels 2, O'Halloran, Kelly, Coniglio, Cadman, Briggs, Bedford		King 4, Higgins 3, Sinclair 2, Gresham 2, Butler 2
		Bests
	Coniglio, Green, Greene, Whitfield, Daniels, Hogan		Sinclair, Marshall, Wanganeen-Milera, Higgins, Wilkie, Gresham

11 27 May 2023; 13:45 AEST (UTC+10:00)	St Kilda	78–88	Hawthorn	Marvel Stadium, Melbourne
	3.2 (20); 5.4 (34); 11.4 (70); 12.6 (78)	Report	2.4 (16); 4.10 (34); 7.14 (56); 12.16 (88)	Attendance: 32,022; Umpires: John Howorth, Robert Findlay, Tom Bryce, Eleni Tee
		Goals
	King 4, Butler 2, Caminiti, Wood, Phillipou, Crouch, Byrnes, Sharman		Lewis 3, Breust 3, Moore, Koschitzke, Macdonald, Impey, Butler, Brockman
		Bests
	King, Crouch, Wanganeen-Milera, Wilkie		Sicily, Newcombe, Day, Lewis, Moore, Nash

Round 12 (Bye for St Kilda)

13 8 June 2023; 19:20 AEST (UTC+10:00)	Sydney	66–80	St Kilda	Sydney Cricket Ground, Sydney
	0.0 (0); 5.5 (35); 7.10 (52); 9.12 (66)	Report	1.1 (7); 4.2 (26); 7.4 (46); 12.8 (80)	Attendance: 30,123; Umpires: Mathew Nicholls, Jamie Broadbent, Craig Fleer, Andre Gianfagna
		Goals
	Franklin 2, Papley 2, Campbell, Clarke, Gulden, Lloyd, Wicks		King 3, Butler 2, Owens 2, Caminiti, Higgins, Phillipou, Sharman, Wanganeen-Milera
		Bests
	Florent, Rowbottom, Warner, Papley, Campbell		Sinclair, Marshall, Crouch, Wanganeen-Milera, Wilkie, Owens

14 17 June 2023; 19:25 AEST (UTC+10:00)	Richmond	90–70	St Kilda	Melbourne Cricket Ground, Melbourne
	6.4 (40); 10.7 (67); 11.10 (76); 13.12 (90)	Report	5.0 (30); 8.2 (50); 11.3 (69); 11.4 (70)	Attendance: 62,686; Umpires: Curtis Deboy, Hayden Gavine, Brendan Hosking, Ray Chamberlain
		Goals
	Bolton 3, Short 2, Miller 2, Cotchin 2, Vlastuin, McIntosh, Baker, Taranto		Butler 3, King 2, Higgins 2, Gresham, Caminiti, Byrnes, Battle
		Bests
	Vlastuin, Cotchin, Taranto, Balta, Short, Martin		Sinclair, Crouch, Butler, Hill, Wilkie, Marshall

15 23 June 2023; 19:50 AEST (UTC+10:00)	St Kilda	56–84	Brisbane Lions	Marvel Stadium, Melbourne
	1.0 (6); 2.3 (15); 6.5 (35); 8.8 (56)	Report	3.4 (22); 5.8 (38); 9.8 (62); 12.12 (84)	Attendance: 28,985; Umpires: Justin Power, Matthew Nicholls, Jamie Broadbent, Andre Gianfagna
		Goals
	Wanganeen-Milera, Sinclair, Hill, Higgins, Gresham, Caminiti, Byrnes, Butler		Hipwood 4, Daniher 2, Rayner, Dunkley, Coleman, Cameron, Berry, Bailey
		Bests
	Sinclair, Wood, Wanganeen-Milera, Battle, Hill, Higgins		Andrews, Hipwood, Neale, Dunkley, Berry, Rayner

16 2 July 2023; 14:40 AWST (UTC+8:00)	West Coast	77–85	St Kilda	Optus Stadium, Perth
	4.1 (25); 9.2 (56); 12.2 (74); 12.5 (77)	Report	3.0 (18); 5.2 (32); 11.7 (73); 12.13 (85)	Attendance: 35,579; Umpires: Leigh Fisher, Hayden Gavine, Alan Whetton, Paul Rebeschini
		Goals
	Allen 2, Hewett 2, Maric 2, Cripps, Darling, Long, Petruccelle, B.Williams, J.Williams		Owens 4, Camaniti 2, Butler 2, King, Higgins, Gresham, Wood
		Bests
	Shuey, Barrass, Hurn, Duggan, Sheed, B Williams		Marshall, Crouch, Owens, Sinclair, Gresham, Steele

17 8 July 2023; 19:25 AEST (UTC+10:00)	St Kilda	58–79	Melbourne	Marvel Stadium, Melbourne
	3.5 (23); 4.7 (31); 6.8 (44); 8.10 (58)	Report	5.0 (30); 7.2 (44); 9.5 (59); 12.7 (79)	Attendance: 30,749; Umpires: Chris Donlin, Nick Foot, Andrew Stephens, Nathan Williamson
		Goals
	Owens 2, Gresham 2, Steele, Wood, Billings, Sharman		Petracca 4, Melksham 2, Sparrow 2, Neal-Bullen, Hunter, Brown, Langdon
		Bests
	Steele, Sinclair, Marshall, Wanganeen-Milera		Petracca, Langdon, Neal-Bullen, May, Sparrow, Viney

18 15 July 2023; 14:10 AEST (UTC+10:00)	Gold Coast	77–51	St Kilda	Metricon Stadium, Gold Coast
	3.2 (20); 5.6 (36); 9.7 (61); 11.11 (77)	Report	0.1 (1); 2.2 (14); 5.3 (33); 8.3 (51)	Attendance: 13,015; Umpires: Andrew Stephens, Andrew Heffernan, Peter Bailes, Andrew Adair
		Goals
	Lukosius 4, Atkins 2, Macpherson, Humphrey, Casboult, Anderson, Ainsworth		Sharman 3, Wood, Phillipou, Marshall, Gresham, Caminiti
		Bests
	Flanders, Powell, Anderson, Atkins, Lukosius, Witts, Holman		Windhager, Wanganeen-Milera, Sharman, Hill, Crouch

19 23 July 2023; 16:40 AEST (UTC+10:00)	St Kilda	69–61	North Melbourne	Marvel Stadium, Melbourne
	3.3 (21); 3.7 (25); 4.12 (36); 9.15 (69)	Report	2.0 (12); 6.1 (37); 8.4 (52); 9.7 (61)	Attendance: 18,279; Umpires: Hayden Gavine, Alex Whetton, Eleni Tee, Cameron Jones
		Goals
	Owens 2, Higgins 2, Marshall, Sharman, Sinclair, Caminiti, Steele		Thomas 3, Larkey 3, Xerri, Ford, Ziebell
		Bests
	Steele, Sinclair, Marshall, Windhager, Wilkie, Higgins		Davies-Uniacke, McKay, Sheezel, Thomas, Phillips, Tucker

20 30 July 2023; 13:10 AEST (UTC+10:00)	Hawthorn	93–122	St Kilda	Marvel Stadium, Melbourne
	3.1 (19); 6.4 (40); 12.6 (78); 14.9 (93)	Report	9.2 (56); 11.3 (69); 14.5 (89); 19.8 (122)	Attendance: 22,769; Umpires: Chris Donlon, John Howorth, Martin Rodger, Matthew Young
		Goals
	Breust 6, Wingard 2, Lewis 2, Day 2, Ryan, Moore		Butler 4, Crouch 3, Sharman 2, Higgins 2, Caminiti 2, Wood, Wanganeen-Milera, Marshall, Gresham, Cordy, Clark
		Bests
	Breust, Day, Worpel, Newcombe, Wingard		Crouch, Butler, Steele, Wood, Sinclair, Wanganeen-Milera

21 6 August 2023; 15:20 AEST (UTC+10:00)	St Kilda	54–73	Carlton	Marvel Stadium, Melbourne
	3.1 (19); 7.2 (44); 8.3 (51); 8.6 (54)	Report	2.4 (16); 3.4 (22); 6.7 (43); 10.13 (73)	Attendance: 42,656; Umpires: Chris Donlon, Robert O'Gorman, Ray Chamberlain, Martin Rodger
		Goals
	King 2, Butler 2, Phillipou, Marshall, Higgins, Crouch		Motlop 2, Acres 2, Owies, Martin, Dow, De Koning, C.Curnow, Cuningham
		Bests
	Crouch, Wood, Wilkie, Clark, Battle, Marshall, Clark		Newman, Fisher, Acres, Cripps, Weitering, Docherty, Dow

22 13 August 2023; 15:20 AEST (UTC+10:00)	St Kilda	93–57	Richmond	Marvel Stadium, Melbourne
	5.0 (30); 10.2 (62); 13.6 (84); 14.9 (93)	Report	2.1 (13); 5.3 (33); 6.5 (41); 8.9 (57)	Attendance: 31,119; Umpires: John Howorth, Alex Whetton, Andre Gianfagna, Matthew Young
		Goals
	King 6, Gresham 3, Higgins, Marshall, Owens, Phillipou, Sharman		Baker 2, Bauer 2, Broad, Bolton, Riewoldt, Taranto
		Bests
	Sinclair, Ross, King, Steele, Marshall, Gresham, Wanganeen-Milera		Taranto, Short, Nankervis, Martin, Broad

23 19 August 2023; 19:25 AEST (UTC+10:00)	St Kilda	88–55	Geelong	Marvel Stadium, Melbourne
	4.3 (27); 6.8 (44); 9.14 (68); 12.16 (88)	Report	2.3 (15); 4.4 (28); 6.5 (41); 8.7 (55)	Attendance: 40,103; Umpires: Jamie Broadbent, Nathan Williamson, Craig Fleer, Jacob Mollison
		Goals
	King 3, Sharman 2, Higgins 2, Butler 2, Owens, Phillipou, Marshall		Hawkins 2, Z. Guthrie, Stengle, Duncan, Holmes, Tuohy, Atkins
		Bests
	Sinclair, Marshall, Crouch, King, Steele, Windhager		Stewart, Atkins, Z.Guthrie, Duncan

24 26 August 2023; 16:35 AEST (UTC+10:00)	Brisbane Lions	72–60	St Kilda	The Gabba, Brisbane
	2.8 (20); 4.11 (35); 7.11 (53); 9.18 (72)	Report	3.1 (19); 3.3 (21); 7.5 (47); 9.6 (60)	Attendance: 31,689; Umpires: Justin Power, Robert O'Gorman, Brendan Hosking, Craig Fleer
		Goals
	Cameron 2, Daniher 2, Zorko, Rayner, McInerney, McCluggage, Fletcher		Membrey 3, Wood, Phillipou, Hayes, Gresham, Crouch, Butler
		Bests
	Neale, Zorko, Coleman, Daniher, McInerney, Wilmot		Wilkie, Marshall, Wood, Sinclair, Crouch, Membrey

== Finals series ==
=== Bracket ===
Qualifying and elimination finals
7 September – Melbourne
1	Collingwood	9.6 (60)
4	Melbourne	7.11 (53)
8 September – Melbourne
5	Carlton	11.8 (74)
8	Sydney	9.14 (68)
9 September – Melbourne
6	St Kilda	11.11 (77)
7	Greater Western Sydney	15.11 (101)
9 September – Brisbane
2	Brisbane Lions	19.9 (123)
3	Port Adelaide	11.9 (75)

Semi-finals
15 September – Melbourne
Melbourne	9.17 (71)
Carlton	11.7 (73)
16 September – Adelaide
Port Adelaide	9.16 (70)
Greater Western Sydney	13.15 (93)

Preliminary finals
22 September – Melbourne
Collingwood	8.10 (58)
Greater Western Sydney	8.9 (57)
23 September – Brisbane
Brisbane Lions	11.13 (79)
Carlton	9.9 (63)

Grand final
30 September – Melbourne
Collingwood	12.18 (90)
Brisbane Lions	13.8 (86)

=== Matches ===
EF2 9 September 2023; 15:20 AEST (UTC+10:00)	St Kilda	77–101	Greater Western Sydney	Melbourne Cricket Ground, Melbourne
	2.3 (15); 6.6 (42); 9.8 (62); 11.11 (77)	Report	5.3 (33); 10.5 (65); 13.9 (87); 15.11 (101)	Attendance: 68,465; Umpires: Chris Donlon, Nick Foot, Brett Rosebury, Robert O'Gorman
		Goals
	King 3, Sharman 2, Hill 2, Higgins, Marshall, Owens, Wanganeen-Milera		Riccardi 3, Bedford 2, Brown 2, Hogan 2, Kelly 2, Callaghan, Greene, Daniels, Lloyd
		Bests
	Steele, Sharman, Marshall, Wanganeen-Milera, Hill		Green, Kelly, Whitfield, Ash, Briggs, Bedford, Idun
