= 2024 St Kilda Football Club season =

126th St Kilda Football Club season

St Kilda Football Club
2024 season
- President: Andrew Bassat
- Coach: Ross Lyon
- Captain: Jack Steele
- Home ground: Marvel Stadium
- Pre-season: 2–0–0
- Home and away season: 12th
- Finals series: Did not qualify
- Leading goalkicker: Jack Higgins (36)
- Highest home attendance: 69,517 vs. Collingwood at Melbourne Cricket Ground (Round 2)
- Lowest home attendance: 17,992 vs. Gold Coast at Marvel Stadium (Round 13)
- Average home attendance: 29,257
- Club membership: 60,332

The 2024 St Kilda Football Club season was the 126th competing in the VFL/AFL and 140th season in the club's history. Coached by Ross Lyon and captained by Jack Steele, they competed in the AFL's 2024 Premiership Season.

== Squad information ==
=== Playing squad ===
The playing squad and coaching staff of the St Kilda Football Club for the 2024 AFL season.

St Kilda Football Club
Senior list		Rookie list	Coaching staff
1 Jack Higgins; 2 Marcus Windhager; 3 Zak Jones; 4 Lance Collard; 5 Brad Crouch; 6 Sebastian Ross; 7 Nasiah Wanganeen-Milera; 8 Bradley Hill; 9 Jack Steele (c); 10 Mitch Owens; 11 Hunter Clark; 12 Max King; 13 Ryan Byrnes; 14 Liam Stocker; 15 Paddy Dow; 16 Dan Butler; 17 Isaac Keeler; 19 Rowan Marshall; 20 Dougal Howard	21 Zaine Cordy; 22 Darcy Wilson; 23 Liam Henry; 24 Angus Hastie; 25 Mattaes Phillipou; 26 Josh Battle; 27 Arie Schoenmaker; 28 Tim Membrey; 29 Jimmy Webster; 30 Matthew Allison; 31 James Van Es; 32 Mason Wood; 33 Ben Paton; 34 Hugo Garcia; 35 Jack Sinclair; 36 Riley Bonner; 38 Tom Campbell; 39 Olli Hotton; 44 Callum Wilkie (vc)	18 Jack Hayes; 40 Max Hall; 41 Angus McLennan (B); 42 Max Heath; 43 Cooper Sharman; 45 Liam O'Connell (B); 47 Anthony Caminiti	Legend: (c) Captain(s); (vc) Vice-captain(s); (B) Category B rookie; italics - Inactive player list; Long-term injury; (ret.) Retired; Updated: 14 August 2024; Source(s):

=== Coaching staff ===
The coaching staff of the St Kilda Football Club for the 2024 AFL season as of 19 April 2024.

Position	Name
AFL senior coach	Ross Lyon
Backline assistant coach	Corey Enright
Midfield assistant coach	Brendon Goddard
Forwards assistant coach	Robert Harvey
Head of development and learning	Damian Carroll
VFL senior coach and development	Jake Batchelor
Development coach	Lenny Hayes

== Squad changes ==
=== Retirements and delistings ===
Player	Method	Career games	Career goals	Ref.
Jack Bytel	Delisted	22	3	
Leo Connolly	Delisted	7	1	
Jack Peris	Delisted	1	0	
Oscar Adams	Delisted	0	0	
Tom Highmore	Delisted	16	0	
Daniel McKenzie	Delisted	73	11	

=== Free agency ===
2023 AFL free agency period losses
Player	Free agent type	New club	Compensation	Notes	Ref
Jade Gresham	Restricted	Essendon	End of First Round		

=== Trade period ===
Clubs involved	Trade		Ref
St Kilda Fremantle	to St Kilda (from Fremantle): Liam Henry; 2024 fourth round pick (Fremantle)	to Fremantle (from St Kilda): 2024 second round pick (St Kilda); 2024 fourth round pick (St Kilda)	
St Kilda Western Bulldogs Carlton Essendon	to St Kilda: Paddy Dow (from Carlton); pick #40 (from Western Bulldogs); 2024 third round pick (from Carlton); to Western Bulldogs: Nick Coffield (from St Kilda); pick #52 (from Essendon); pick #56 (from St Kilda)	to Carlton: 2024 third round pick (from Essendon); 2024 fourth round pick (from Western Bulldogs); 2024 fourth round pick (Fremantle, from St Kilda); to Essendon: pick #35 (from St Kilda); 2024 fourth round pick (from Carlton)	
Melbourne St Kilda	to Melbourne (from St Kilda): Jack Billings	to St Kilda (from Melbourne): 2024 third round pick (Melbourne)	
Picks swapped at the 2023 National Draft
St Kilda Melbourne	to St Kilda (from Melbourne): pick #42	to Melbourne (from St Kilda): 2024 third round pick (St Kilda)	
St Kilda Gold Coast	to St Kilda (from Gold Coast): pick #27	to Gold Coast (from St Kilda): pick #40; pick #42	
Greater Western Sydney St Kilda	to Greater Western Sydney (from St Kilda): pick #17	to St Kilda (from Greater Western Sydney): pick #18; 2024 second round pick (Adelaide)	
St Kilda Greater Western Sydney	to St Kilda (from Greater Western Sydney): pick #50	to Greater Western Sydney (from St Kilda): 2024 third round pick (Carlton)	

=== National Draft ===
Round	Pick	Player	Recruited from		Notes
Round	Pick	Player	Club	League	Notes
1	18	Darcy Wilson	Murray Bushrangers	Talent League	←Greater Western Sydney←Adelaide ←Gold Coast←Melbourne
1	28	Lance Collard	Subiaco	WAFL	Free Agency Compensation pick (Gresham)
2	33	Angus Hastie	Geelong Falcons	Talent League	←Gold Coast←Adelaide←Gold Coast (2022)
3	50	Hugo Garcia	Calder Cannons	Talent League	←Greater Western Sydney
5	62	Arie Schoenmaker	Tasmania Devils	Talent League	

=== Pre-Season Draft ===
Round	Pick	Player	Recruited from	
Round	Pick	Player	Club	League
1	3	Riley Bonner	Port Adelaide	AFL

=== Mid-Season Rookie Draft ===
Round	Pick	Player	Recruited from	
Round	Pick	Player	Club	League
1	4	Max Hall	Box Hill Hawks	VFL

=== Category B rookie selections ===
Table of Category B rookie selections
Name	Origin	Note	Ref
Liam O'Connell	Cork GAA	International Selection (Ireland)	

== Pre-season ==
23 February 2024; 14:00 AEDT (UTC+11:00)	St Kilda	106–40	Essendon	RSEA Park, Melbourne
	3.3 (21); 7.8 (50); 10.9 (69); 16.10 (106)	Report	2.2 (14); 2.5 (17); 4.7 (31); 5.10 (40)	Attendance: 5,007
		Goals
	King 4, Higgins 3, Membrey 3, Sharman 3, Bonner, Garcia, Henry		Langford 2, Caldwell, Guelfi, Redman

3 March 2024; 14:10 AEDT (UTC+11:00)	St Kilda	84–65	North Melbourne	RSEA Park, Melbourne
	5.2 (32); 8.12 (60); 8.14 (62); 11.18 (84)	Report	3.1 (19); 4.2 (26); 9.5 (59); 10.5 (65)	Attendance: 7,906; Umpires: Nicholas Brown, Alex Whetton, Cameron Dore, Jacob Mollison
		Goals
	Sharman 2, Owens 2, Membrey 2, King 2, Marshall, Henry, Bonner		Larkey 3, Zurhaar 2, Duursma 2, Stephenson, Goater, Coleman-Jones
		Bests
	Owens, Wilson, Bonner, Wanganeen-Milera, Byrnes		Fisher, Stephens, Sheezel, Zurhaar, Larkey, Duursma

== Premiership season ==
=== League table ===
Pos	Team	Pld	W	L	D	PF	PA	PP	Pts	Qualification
1	Sydney	23	17	6	0	2242	1769	126.7	68	Finals series
2	Port Adelaide	23	16	7	0	2011	1752	114.8	64	Finals series
3	Geelong	23	15	8	0	2164	1928	112.2	60	Finals series
4	Greater Western Sydney	23	15	8	0	2034	1864	109.1	60	Finals series
5	Brisbane Lions (P)	23	14	8	1	2130	1747	121.9	58	Finals series
6	Western Bulldogs	23	14	9	0	2171	1736	125.1	56	Finals series
7	Hawthorn	23	14	9	0	2090	1763	118.5	56	Finals series
8	Carlton	23	13	10	0	2151	1952	110.2	52	Finals series
9	Collingwood	23	12	9	2	1991	1943	102.5	52	
10	Fremantle	23	12	10	1	1964	1755	111.9	50	
11	Essendon	23	11	11	1	1892	2024	93.5	46	
12	St Kilda	23	11	12	0	1748	1758	99.4	44	
13	Gold Coast	23	11	12	0	1925	1943	99.1	44	
14	Melbourne	23	11	12	0	1785	1812	98.5	44	
15	Adelaide	23	8	14	1	1906	1923	99.1	34	
16	West Coast	23	5	18	0	1594	2339	68.1	20	
17	North Melbourne	23	3	20	0	1619	2550	63.5	12	
18	Richmond	23	2	21	0	1505	2364	63.7	8	

Source: afl.com.au
Rules for classification: 1) points; 2) percentage; 3) number of points for
(P) Premiers

=== Result by round ===
Round	1	2	3	4	5	6	7	8	9	10	11	12	13	14	15	16	17	18	19	20	21	22	23	24
Ground	A	H	A	N	A	H	A	H	A	H	A	A	H	A	–	H	H	A	H	H	H	A	H	A
Result	L	W	L	W	L	L	L	W	L	L	L	W	W	L	B	L	W	L	W	W	L	W	W	W
Position	11	9	11	9	12	13	14	14	14	14	15	15	14	14	14	15	14	15	15	14	14	14	13	12

Updated to match(es) played on 19 April 2024. Source: AFL Season Ladder - AFL.com.au
A = Away; H = Home; N = Neutral; B = Bye; W = Win; D = Draw; L = Loss

=== Matches ===
Opening Round (Bye for St Kilda)

1 16 March 2024; 19:30 AEDT (UTC+11:00)	Geelong	76–68	St Kilda	GMHBA Stadium, Geelong
	2.3 (15); 6.7 (43); 6.13 (49); 10.16 (76)	Report	1.5 (11); 4.6 (30); 5.9 (39); 9.14 (68)	Attendance: 39,352; Umpires: Justin Power, Matt Stevic, Brendan Hosking, Martin Rodger
		Goals
	Dempsey 3, Cameron 2, Close, Dangerfield, Tuohy, O.Henry, Hawkins		Membrey 3, Wilson 2, King 2, Phillipou, Sharman
		Bests
	Holmes, Dangerfield, Dempsey, Stewart, Cameron, Duncan		Wanganeen-Milera, Steele, Marshall, Membrey, Bonner, King

2 21 March 2024; 19:30 AEDT (UTC+11:00)	St Kilda	94–79	Collingwood	Melbourne Cricket Ground, Melbourne
	5.1 (31); 6.2 (38); 11.7 (73); 14.10 (94)	Report	3.1 (19); 7.4 (46); 8.5 (53); 12.7 (79)	Attendance: 69,517; Umpires: Nick Foot, Leigh Fisher, Brendan Hosking, Jacob Mollison
		Goals
	Higgins 4, King 3, Membrey 2, Henry 2, Hill, Sharman, Phillipou		Elliott 3, McInnes 3, Lipinski 2, Hill 2, Schultz, Cameron
		Bests
	Wanganeen-Milera, Windhager, Steele, Higgins, Marshall, Owens		J.Daicos, Lipinski, Elliott, Crisp, N.Daicos

3 30 March 2024; 16:20 AEDT (UTC+11:00)	Essendon	71–67	St Kilda	Marvel Stadium, Melbourne
	3.1 (19); 5.3 (33); 8.5 (53); 10.11 (71)	Report	4.4 (28); 6.8 (44); 8.12 (60); 9.13 (67)	Attendance: 44,412; Umpires: Jamie Broadbent, Robert O'Gorman, Mathew Nicholls, Peter Bailes
		Goals
	Stringer 3, Langford 3, Jones 2, McGrath, Duursma		Higgins 3, Caminiti 2, Sinclair, Ross, Owens, Butler
		Bests
	Martin, Duursma, Merrett, Parish, Langford		Ross, Steele, Hill, Marshall, Higgins, Bonner

4 7 April 2024; 14:50 ACST (UTC+09:30)	Richmond	60–67	St Kilda	Norwood Oval, Adelaide
	4.1 (25); 5.3 (33); 7.3 (45); 9.6 (60)	Report	0.4 (4); 1.5 (11); 7.11 (53); 9.13 (67)	Attendance: 9,425; Umpires: John Howorth, Nathan Williamson, Matthew Young, Cameron Dore
		Goals
	Bolton 4, M.Rioli 2, Lefau, Koschitzke, Sonsie		Higgins 2, Membrey, Wilson, Caminiti, King, Owens, Marshall, Bonner
		Bests
	Bolton, Martin, Nankervis, Taranto, Vlastuin		Steele, Hill, Wilkie, Sinclair, Wanganeen-Milera

5 13 April 2024; 13:45 AEST (UTC+10:00)	Greater Western Sydney	80–79	St Kilda	Manuka Oval, Canberra
	4.4 (28); 7.6 (48); 10.10 (70); 11.14 (80)	Report	1.3 (9); 4.5 (29); 6.5 (41); 12.7 (79)	Attendance: 12,448; Umpires: Chris Donlon, Matt Stevic, Robert O'Gorman, Andrew Heffernan
		Goals
	Hogan 2, Greene 2, Thomas, Riccardi, Kelly, Green, Daniels, Coniglio, Cadman		Owens 2, Membrey 2, Higgins 2, Caminiti 2, Wilson, Steele, Sinclair, Hill
		Bests
	Whitfield, Green, Ash, Greene, Bedford		Hill, Marshall, Steele, Owens, Garcia, Wilkie

6 18 April 2024; 19:30 AEST (UTC+10:00)	St Kilda	64–124	Western Bulldogs	Marvel Stadium, Melbourne
	1.0 (6); 4.3 (27); 5.7 (37); 9.10 (64)	Report	7.1 (43); 12.4 (76); 17.6 (108); 19.10 (124)	Attendance: 26,719; Umpires: Andrew Stephens, Brendan Hosking, Andre Gianfagna, Jacob Mollison
		Goals
	Membrey 3, Caminiti, Jones, Garcia, Wilson, Owens, Sharman		Naughton 6, Weightman 3, Bontempelli 3, Darcy, Dale, Treloar, West, English, Gallagher, Macrae
		Bests
	Windhager, Wanganeen-Milera, Steele, Garcia		Naughton, Treloar, Dale, Weightman, Macrae, Johannisen

7 26 April 2024; 19:40 ACST (UTC+09:30)	Port Adelaide	82–72	St Kilda	Adelaide Oval, Adelaide
	1.8 (14); 6.9 (45); 9.13 (67); 11.16 (82)	Report	3.3 (21); 5.5 (35); 8.6 (54); 11.6 (72)	Attendance: 40,306; Umpires: Leigh Haussen, Simon Meredith, Nathan Williamson, Andrew Heffernan
		Goals
	Dixon 4, Rioli 2, Wines, Rozee, Powell-Pepper, Georgiades, Byrne-Jones		Owens 2, Higgins 2, Sinclair, Sharman, Phillipou, Membrey, Hill, Cordy, Caminiti
		Bests
	Drew, Butters, Dixon, Wines, Burgoyne, Houston		Sinclair, Wanganeen-Milera, Wilson, Wilkie, Owens

8 4 May 2024; 16:35 AEST (UTC+10:00)	St Kilda	103–65	North Melbourne	Marvel Stadium, Melbourne
	4.2 (26); 8.6 (54); 12.8 (80); 15.13 (103)	Report	3.2 (20); 4.2 (26); 7.4 (46); 10.5 (65)	Attendance: 27,009; Umpires: Robert O'Gorman, Tom Bryce, Paul Rebeschini, Jordan Fry
		Goals
	Wilson 3, Sinclair 2, Hill 2, Hayes 2, Wood, Ross, Membrey, King, Hastie, Marshall		Zurhaar 3, Larkey 2, Curtis 2, Wardlaw, Simpkin, Powell
		Bests
	Wilson, Sinclair, Howard, Hayes, Wanganeen-Milera, Windhager, Hill		Wardlaw, Xerri, Sheezel, McKercher, Fisher

9 11 May 2024; 13:45 AEST (UTC+10:00)	Hawthorn	58–53	St Kilda	University of Tasmania Stadium, Launceston
	4.1 (25); 6.2 (38); 8.6 (54); 8.10 (58)	Report	3.3 (21); 4.4 (28); 5.9 (39); 7.11 (53)	Attendance: 15,112; Umpires: Chris Donlon, Alex Whetton, Andrew Adair, Cameron Jones
		Goals
	Moore 2, Watson 2, Macdonald, Meek, Ginnivan, Breust		Owens 2, Battle 2, King 2, Membrey
		Bests
	Newcombe, Meek, Amon, Moore		Marshall, Steele, Wanganeen-Milera, Wilkie

10 18 May 2024; 19:30 AEST (UTC+10:00)	St Kilda	55–72	Fremantle	Marvel Stadium, Melbourne
	2.0 (12); 5.3 (33); 7.5 (47); 8.7 (55)	Report	3.2 (20); 5.6 (36); 6.11 (47); 9.18 (72)	Attendance: 19,265; Umpires: Matt Stevic, Jamie Broadbent, Cameron Dore, Jacob Mollison
		Goals
	Owens 3, Caminiti 2, Dow, Henry, Phillipou		Amiss 2, O'Meara 2, Johnson, Sharp, Voss, Banfield, Treacy
		Bests
	Marshall, Sinclair, Steele, Windhager, Battle, Owens		Clark, Serong, Jackson, Ryan, Young, Brayshaw

11 26 May 2024; 15:20 AEST (UTC+10:00)	Melbourne	100–62	St Kilda	Melbourne Cricket Ground, Melbourne
	4.7 (31); 5.9 (39); 11.10 (76); 14.16 (100)	Report	1.0 (6); 4.3 (27); 5.5 (35); 9.8 (62)	Attendance: 37,403; Umpires: Curtis Deboy, Nicholas Brown, Brendan Hosking, John Howorth
		Goals
	Van Rooyen 3, Fritsch 2, Viney 2, Petracca 2, Hunter, Gawn, Chandler, Pickett, May		King 3, Higgins 2, Owens, Steele, Sinclair, Wilson
		Bests
	Gawn, Petracca, Viney, Salem, May		Steele, Wanganeen-Milera, Sinclair, Wood

12 1 June 2024; 14:35 AWST (UTC+8:00)	West Coast	68–82	St Kilda	Optus Stadium, Perth
	2.5 (17); 6.6 (42); 8.7 (55); 10.8 (68)	Report	1.2 (8); 4.4 (28); 7.8 (50); 12.10 (82)	Attendance: 47,526; Umpires: Brett Rosebury, Nathan Toner, Paul Rebeschini, Nicholas McGinness
		Goals
	Ryan 3, Cripps 3, Darling 2, Gaff, B.Williams		Wood 4, King 2, Caminiti, Henry, Higgins, Membrey, Ross, Sinclair
		Bests
	Yeo, Barrass, Cripps, Ginbey, Duggan, Ryan, Reid		Wood, Wanganeen-Milera, Windhager, Sinclair, Dow, Wilkie, Marshall

13 8 June 2024; 19:30 AEST (UTC+10:00)	St Kilda	51–48	Gold Coast	Marvel Stadium, Melbourne
	3.1 (19); 4.5 (29); 6.7 (43); 7.9 (51)	Report	1.1 (7); 2.3 (15); 5.5 (35); 7.6 (48)	Attendance: 17,992; Umpires: Chris Donlon, Daniel Johanson, Cameron Dore, Paul Rebeschini
		Goals
	Butler 3, Higgins 2, King 2		King 2, Rowell, Ainsworth, Long, Swallow, Miller
		Bests
	Battle, Sinclair, Marshall, Wanganeen-Milera, Higgins		Collins, Flanders, Long, Jeffrey, Uwland

14 14 June 2024; 19:40 AEST (UTC+10:00)	Brisbane Lions	126–106	St Kilda	The Gabba, Brisbane
	7.2 (44); 10.5 (65); 15.9 (99); 19.12 (126)	Report	2.1 (13); 6.6 (42); 9.8 (62); 16.10 (106)	Attendance: 27,445; Umpires: Chris Donlon, Mathew Nicholls, John Howorth, Andre Gianfagna
		Goals
	Daniher 5, Morris 3, Hipwood 2, Lohmann 2, McCluggage 2, Ah Chee, Cameron, McInerney, Rayner, Starcevich		Higgins 5, King 3, Butler 2, Henry 2, Owens 2, Wilson, Wood
		Bests
	Zorko, Daniher, McCluggage, Wilmot, Berry, Lester		Sinclair, Higgins, Wood, Henry, Wilkie, Wilson

Round 15 (Bye for St Kilda)

16 30 June 2024; 13:10 AEST (UTC+10:00)	St Kilda	60–62	Port Adelaide	Marvel Stadium, Melbourne
	3.3 (21); 6.6 (42); 6.10 (46); 8.12 (60)	Report	4.1 (25); 6.6 (42); 8.11 (59); 8.14 (62)	Attendance: 18,052; Umpires: Simon Meredith, Andre Gianfagna, Andrew Heffernan, Cameron Jones
		Goals
	Marshall 3, Clark, Wood, Hill, Sharman, Higgins		Butters, Lord, Bergman, Narkle, Mead, Horne-Francis, Evans, Finlayson
		Bests
	Sinclair, Wanganeen-Milera, Marshall, Wood, Steele		Horne-Francis, Rozee, Butters, Farrell, Aliir

17 7 July 2024; 15:20 AEST (UTC+10:00)	St Kilda	84–82	Sydney	Marvel Stadium, Melbourne
	2.2 (14); 4.4 (28); 9.4 (58); 13.6 (84)	Report	2.2 (14); 8.5 (53); 11.11 (77); 11.16 (82)	Attendance: 30,267; Umpires: Mathew Nicholls, Nathan Toner, Harrison Birch, Nicholas McGinness
		Goals
	Higgins 3, Marshall 2, Sharman 2, Wilson, Butler, Wood, Henry, Phillipou, Membrey		McDonald 2, Warner 2, Heeney 2, McInerney, Campbell, Fox, Papley, Florent
		Bests
	Henry, Marshall, Steele, Phillipou, Wanganeen-Milera, Higgins		Rowbottom, Warner, Gulden, Heeney, Florent

18 13 July 2024; 19:00 ACST (UTC+09:30)	Adelaide	71–39	St Kilda	Adelaide Oval, Adelaide
	2.1 (13); 5.5 (35); 6.10 (46); 10.11 (71)	Report	3.3 (21); 4.7 (31); 5.8 (38); 5.9 (39)	Attendance: 34,549; Umpires: Nicholas Brown, Mathew Nicholls, Cameron Jones, Nicholas McGinness
		Goals
	Thilthorpe 2, Sholl 2, Murphy, Keays, Himmelberg, Fogarty, Dowling, Rachele		Wood 2, Sharman 2, Phillipou
		Bests
	Dawson, Laird, Sholl, Keays, Taylor		Marshall, Phillipou, Clark, Wanganeen-Milera

19 20 July 2024; 13:45 AEST (UTC+10:00)	St Kilda	113–41	West Coast	Marvel Stadium, Melbourne
	3.3 (21); 7.5 (41); 10.9 (69); 17.11 (113)	Report	2.0 (12); 4.4 (28); 5.5 (35); 6.5 (41)	Attendance: 18,251; Umpires: Chris Donlon, Nicholas Brown, Paul Rebeschini, Harrison Birch
		Goals
	Membrey 5, Wood 3, Sharman 2, Butler 2, Wilson, Steele, Owens, Higgins, Battle		J. Williams 3, Allen 2, Maric
		Bests
	Membrey, Steele, Wood, Marshall, Sinclair, Jones		Hunt, Reid, Barrass, Ginbey

20 27 July 2024; 16:35 AEST (UTC+10:00)	St Kilda	108–55	Essendon	Marvel Stadium, Melbourne
	5.1 (31); 7.2 (44); 14.4 (88); 17.6 (108)	Report	2.3 (15); 5.5 (35); 6.7 (43); 8.7 (55)	Attendance: 39,761; Umpires: Brett Rosebury, Alex Whetton, Nathan Toner, Nicholas McGinness
		Goals
	Caminiti 3, Sharman 3, Steele 3, Membrey 2, Higgins 2, Owens, Butler, Marshall, Wanganeen-Milera		Shiel 2, Draper, Durham, Duursma, Jones, Merrett, Stringer
		Bests
	Marshall, Steele, Wanganeen-Milera, Sharman, Sinclair		Merrett, Duursma, Durham, Caldwell

21 4 August 2024; 16:40 AEST (UTC+10:00)	St Kilda	39–124	Brisbane Lions	Marvel Stadium, Melbourne
	1.3 (9); 1.4 (10); 3.7 (25); 5.9 (39)	Report	4.0 (24); 9.3 (57); 13.6 (84); 19.10 (124)	Attendance: 23,053; Umpires: Leigh Haussen, Robert O'Gorman, Nathan Toner, Jacob Mollison
		Goals
	Marshall 2, Membrey, Phillipou, Caminiti		Daniher 4, Rayner 3, Bailey 3, Cameron 2, Ah Chee 2, Morris 2, Reville, McCluggage, Fletcher
		Bests
	Battle, Phillipou, Webster, Sinclair		Rayner, Neale, McCluggage, McInerney, Daniher, Starcevich

22 11 August 2024; 15:20 AEST (UTC+10:00)	Richmond	51–99	St Kilda	Marvel Stadium, Melbourne
	3.1 (19); 5.2 (32); 7.5 (49); 7.9 (51)	Report	4.1 (25); 7.4 (46); 11.5 (71); 15.9 (99)	Attendance: 21,375; Umpires: Jeff Dalgleish, Andrew Adair, Cameron Jones, James Strybos
		Goals
	Bauer 2, Bolton 2, Ralphsmith 2, Koschitzke		Marshall 3, Membrey 3, Sharman 2, Butler 2, Owens, Dow, Wilson, Caminiti, Higgins
		Bests
	Rioli, Hopper, Banks, Taranto, Balta		Marshall, Battle, Sinclair, Steele, Membrey

23 17 August 2024; 19:30 AEST (UTC+10:00)	St Kilda	107–89	Geelong	Marvel Stadium, Melbourne
	0.3 (3); 3.6 (24); 10.10 (70); 16.11 (107)	Report	3.2 (20); 9.3 (57); 10.4 (64); 14.5 (89)	Attendance: 31,945; Umpires: Mathew Nicholls, John Howorth, Alex Whetton, Matthew Young
		Goals
	Higgins 3, Wilson 2, Sharman 2, Owens 2, Steele 2, Wood, Membrey, Marshall, Hill, Butler		Cameron 3, Stengle 2, Mannagh 2, Rohan, Neale, Knevitt, O.Henry, Dempsey, Dangerfield, Stanley
		Bests
	Wilkie, Marshall, Steele, Wilson, Higgins		Humphries, Stewart, Mannagh, Bowes, Cameron

24 25 August 2024; 15:20 AEST (UTC+10:00)	Carlton	74–76	St Kilda	Marvel Stadium, Melbourne
	1.3 (9); 4.3 (27); 9.5 (59); 11.8 (74)	Report	2.2 (14); 5.7 (37); 10.8 (68); 11.10 (76)	Attendance: 43,843; Umpires: Curtis Deboy, Andrew Stephens, Brendan Hosking, Jacob Mollison
		Goals
	Acres 2, Carroll, Binns, Fantasia, Hewett, Kemp, Owies, Pittonet, Moir, Motlop		Membrey 2, Wood 2, Higgins 2, Phillipou, Byrnes, Dow, Jones, Marshall
		Bests
	Cripps, Newman, Walsh, Hewett, Acres		Wanganeen-Milera, Sinclair, Steele, Phillipou, Wood, Jones
