= 2022 St Kilda Football Club season =

St Kilda Football Club
2022 season
- President: Andrew Bassat
- Coach: Brett Ratten
- Captain: Jack Steele
- Home ground: Marvel Stadium; Cazalys Stadium
- Pre-season: 1–0–0
- Home and away season: 10th
- Finals series: DNQ
- Leading goalkicker: Max King (52)
- Highest home attendance: 40,129 (18 March vs Collingwood, Round 1)
- Lowest home attendance: 6,645 (30 April vs Port Adelaide, Round 7)
- Average home attendance: 25,386
- Club membership: 60,172

The 2022 St Kilda Football Club season was the 124th competing in the VFL/AFL and 138th in the club's history. Coached by Brett Ratten and captained by Jack Steele, they competed in the AFL's 2022 Premiership Season.

== Squad changes ==
=== Retirements and delistings ===
Three retirees were announced in the days following St Kilda's final game of 2021, while Dylan Roberton had announced his retirement in January. While the Saints' lost 612 games of experience, combined the retirees only managed 10 games in 2021.

Player	Reason	Career games	Career goals
Sam Alabakis	Delisted	0	0
Jake Carlisle	Retired	151 (66 St Kilda, 85 Essendon)	62
Oscar Clavarino	Delisted	5	0
Luke Dunstan	Free Agency	116	46
James Frawley	Retired	241 (2 St Kilda, 100 Melbourne, 139 Hawthorn)	24
Paul Hunter	Delisted	7	2
Jack Lonie	Delisted	87	73
Shaun McKernan	Retired	91 (4 St Kilda, 53 Essendon, 34 Adelaide)	74
Dylan Roberton	Retired	129 (92 St Kilda, 37 Fremantle)	20

=== Trade period ===
Clubs involved	Trade		Ref
Melbourne; Western Bulldogs; Adelaide; St Kilda	to Melbourne: pick #17 (from Western Bulldogs); pick #37 (from Adelaide); pick #49 (from St Kilda); to Western Bulldogs: pick #23 (from Adelaide); pick #44 (from Adelaide); pick #45 (from Melbourne)	to Adelaide: pick #33 (from Melbourne); pick #75 (from Western Bulldogs); 2022 first round pick (Melbourne); to St Kilda: pick #62 (from Adelaide); pick #66 (from Adelaide); 2022 fourth round pick (Adelaide)	

=== Delisted free agency period ===
Former North Melbourne and Western Bulldogs ruckman Tom Campbell joined the Saints as a delisted free agent on 5 November 2021.

=== National draft ===
Round	Pick	Player	Recruited from		Notes
Round	Pick	Player	Club	League	Notes
1	11	Nasiah Wanganeen-Milera	Glenelg	SANFL	
2	33	Mitchito Owens	Sandringham Dragons	NAB League	Next Generation Academy selection (Japanese descent), matched bid by Sydney
3	47	Marcus Windhager	Sandringham Dragons	NAB League	Next Generation Academy selection (Indigenous), matched bid by Geelong
3	51	Oscar Adams	Glenelg	SANFL	←Melbourne (draft)←Western Bulldogs (2020)

=== Category B rookie selections ===
Name	Origin	Note	Ref
Jack Peris	Sandringham Dragons (NAB League)	Next Generation Academy selection (indigenous)	
Josiah Kyle	Dandenong Stingrays (NAB League)	Next Generation Academy selection (indigenous)	

=== Pre-season supplemental selection period ===
Name	Recruited from		Note	Ref
Jack Hayes	Woodville-West Torrens	SANFL		
Jarrod Lienert	Port Adelaide	AFL		

=== Coaching staff changes ===
In:

- Corey Enright (Defence)
- Nick Walsh (High Performance Manager)
- Damian Carroll (Head of Development and Learning)
- Ernie Merrick (Senior Coach Mentor)

Out:

- Aaron Hamill (Defence)
- Adam Skrobalak (Forwards)
- Matt Hornsby (High Performance Manager)
- Andrew Wallis (Senior Physio)

== Pre-season ==
=== Practice matches ===
A practice match against Carlton at Princes Park was confirmed on 7 February 2022 to be played a fortnight later in preparation for the home and away season.

**Rd**	**Date and local time**	**Opponent**	**Scores** (St Kilda's scores indicated in **bold**)			**Venue**	**Attendance**
**Rd**	**Date and local time**	**Opponent**	Home	Away	Result	**Venue**	**Attendance**
Practice	Thursday 24 February, 10.00am	Carlton	9.13 (67)	**8.12 (60)**	Lost by 7 points	Princes Park (A)	TBA
1	Saturday 5 March, 7.10pm	Essendon	9.17 (71)	**12.10 (82)**	Won by 11 points	Marvel Stadium (A)	9,075

== Premiership season ==
=== League table ===
Pos	Team	Pld	W	L	D	PF	PA	PP	Pts	Qualification
1	Geelong (P)	22	18	4	0	2146	1488	144.2	72	Finals series
2	Melbourne	22	16	6	0	1936	1483	130.5	64	Finals series
3	Sydney	22	16	6	0	2067	1616	127.9	64	Finals series
4	Collingwood	22	16	6	0	1839	1763	104.3	64	Finals series
5	Fremantle	22	15	6	1	1739	1486	117.0	62	Finals series
6	Brisbane Lions	22	15	7	0	2147	1799	119.3	60	Finals series
7	Richmond	22	13	8	1	2165	1780	121.6	54	Finals series
8	Western Bulldogs	22	12	10	0	1973	1812	108.9	48	Finals series
9	Carlton	22	12	10	0	1857	1714	108.3	48	
**10**	St Kilda	**22**	**11**	**11**	**0**	**1703**	**1715**	**99.3**	44	
11	Port Adelaide	22	10	12	0	1806	1638	110.3	40	
12	Gold Coast	22	10	12	0	1871	1820	102.8	40	
13	Hawthorn	22	8	14	0	1787	1991	89.8	32	
14	Adelaide	22	8	14	0	1721	1986	86.7	32	
15	Essendon	22	7	15	0	1737	2087	83.2	28	
16	Greater Western Sydney	22	6	16	0	1631	1927	84.6	24	
17	West Coast	22	2	20	0	1429	2389	59.8	8	
18	North Melbourne	22	2	20	0	1337	2397	55.8	8	

Source: afl.com.au
Rules for classification: 1) points; 2) percentage; 3) number of points for.
(P) Premiers

=== Result by round ===
Round	1	2	3	4	5	6	7	8	9	10	11	12	13	14	15	16	17	18	19	20	21	22	23
Ground	H	A	H	A	H	A	H	A	H	A	H	–	A	H	A	A	H	A	A	H	A	H	H
Result	L	W	W	W	W	W	L	L	W	W	W	B	L	L	L	W	L	L	W	W	L	L	L
Position	12	11	9	4	4	5	4	7	6	5	4	5	6	8	10	9	9	10	9	8	9	10	10

Updated to match(es) played on 20 August 2022. Source: Australian Football League
A = Away; H = Home; B = Bye; W = Win; D = Draw; L = Loss

=== Matches ===
The fixture for the 2022 season was released on 9 December 2021, with only the first nine rounds released with dates and times for each match. The remainder of the fixture from round 10 was left as a floating fixture so as to prioritize the best matches for each round in prime-time slots, and dates were released progressively through the year.

**Rd**	**Date and local time**	**Opponent**	**Scores** (St Kilda's scores indicated in **bold**)			**Venue**	**Attendance**	**Ladder**
**Rd**	**Date and local time**	**Opponent**	Home	Away	Result	**Venue**	**Attendance**	**Ladder**
1	Friday 18 March, 7.50pm	Collingwood	**12.13 (85)**	15.12 (102)	Lost by 17 points	Docklands Stadium (H)	40,129	12th
2	Sunday 27 March, 3.20pm	Fremantle	8.7 (55)	**9.11 (65)**	Won by 10 points	Perth Stadium (A)	25,284	11th
3	Sunday 3 April, 3.20pm	Richmond	**18.9 (117)**	13.6 (84)	Won by 33 points	Docklands Stadium (H)	31,933	9th
4	Sunday, 10 April, 3.20pm	Hawthorn	10.13 (73)	**22.10 (142)**	Won by 69 points	MCG (A)	30,926	4th
5	Saturday, 16 April, 1.45pm	Gold Coast	**13.9 (87)**	9.7 (61)	Won by 26 points	Docklands Stadium (H)	18,724	4th
6	Friday, 22 April, 7.50pm	Greater Western Sydney	8.12 (60)	**10.17 (77)**	Won by 17 points	Manuka Oval (A)	14,548	5th
7	Saturday 30 April, 7.25pm	Port Adelaide	**4.18 (42)**	5.13 (43)	Lost by 1 point	Cazalys Stadium (H)	6,645	4th
8	Sunday 8 May, 1.10pm	Melbourne	14.9 (93)	**8.7 (55)**	Lost by 38 points	MCG (A)	35,767	7th
9	Saturday 14 May, 4.35pm	Geelong	**13.12 (90)**	11.14 (80)	Won by 10 points	Docklands Stadium (H)	32,517	6th
10	Saturday 21 May, 7.00pm	Adelaide	9.15 (69)	**14.6 (90)**	Won by 21 points	Adelaide Oval (A)	28,783	5th
11	Sunday 29 May, 1.10pm	North Melbourne	**16.7 (103)**	7.8 (50)	Won by 53 points	Docklands Stadium (H)	23,464	4th
12	**Bye Round**							5th
13	Saturday 11 June, 7.25pm	Brisbane Lions	10.18 (78)	**8.9 (57)**	Lost by 21 points	Gabba (A)	26,610	6th
14	Friday 17 June, 7.50pm	Essendon	**11.6 (72)**	15.17 (107)	Lost by 35 points	Docklands Stadium (H)	33,274	8th
15	Saturday 25 June, 7.25pm	Sydney	12.11 (83)	**4.8 (32)**	Lost by 51 points	SCG (A)	31,513	10th
16	Friday 1 July, 7.25pm	Carlton	10.18 (78)	**14.9 (93)**	Won by 15 points	Docklands Stadium (A)	43,194	9th
17	Saturday 9 July, 7.25pm	Fremantle	**10.10 (70)**	17.9 (111)	Lost by 41	Docklands Stadium (H)	21,652	9th
18	Friday 15 July, 7.50pm	Western Bulldogs	13.6 (84)	**7.14 (56)**	Lost by 28	Docklands Stadium (A)	25,981	10th
19	Sunday, 24 July, 4.40pm	West Coast	10.2 (62)	**14.6 (90)**	Won by 28 points	Perth Stadium (A)	35,665	9th
20	Saturday, 30 July, 4:35pm	Hawthorn	**10.15 (75)**	9.9 (63)	Won by 12 points	Docklands Stadium (H)	25,348	8th
21	Saturday, 6 August, 7:25pm	Geelong	17.8 (110)	**10.5 (65)**	Lost by 45 points	Kardinia Park (A)	20,583	9th
22	Friday, 12 August, 7:50pm	Brisbane Lions	**9.12 (66)**	12.9 (81)	Lost by 15 points	Docklands Stadium (H)	22,211	10th
23	Sunday, 21 August, 4:40pm	Sydney	**11.8 (74)**	13.10 (88)	Lost by 14 points	Docklands Stadium (H)	23,344	10th

== Players and staff ==
=== Playing and coaching staff list ===
The playing squad and coaching staff of the St Kilda Football Club for the 2022 AFL season as of 8 August 2022.

St Kilda Football Club
Senior list		Rookie list	Coaching staff
1 Nick Coffield; 3 Zak Jones; 4 Jade Gresham; 5 Brad Crouch; 6 Sebastian Ross; 7 Nasiah Wanganeen-Milera; 8 Bradley Hill; 9 Jack Steele (c); 10 Dan Hannebery; 11 Hunter Clark; 12 Max King; 13 Ryan Byrnes; 14 Jarryn Geary; 15 Jack Billings; 16 Dan Butler; 17 Marcus Windhager; 18 Paddy Ryder; 19 Rowan Marshall; 20 Dougal Howard (vc); 21 Ben Long	22 Jack Higgins; 23 Jack Bytel; 24 Mitchito Owens; 25 Dean Kent; 26 Josh Battle; 27 Oscar Adams; 28 Tim Membrey (vc); 29 Jimmy Webster; 30 Matthew McLeod-Allison; 33 Ben Paton; 34 Tom Highmore; 35 Jack Sinclair; 36 Daniel McKenzie; 37 Leo Connolly; 38 Tom Campbell; 44 Callum Wilkie (vc)	31 Jarrod Lienert; 32 Mason Wood; 39 Darragh Joyce; 42 Max Heath; 43 Cooper Sharman; 45 Jack Peris (B); 46 Josiah Kyle (B) (ret.); 47 Jack Hayes	**Head coach**: Brett Ratten; **Assistant coaches**: Brendon Lade (forwards); Corey Enright (defence); Ben McGlynn (midfield); Jake Batchelor (VFL coach/development); Jarryd Roughead (football operations assistant); Ben Jacobs (development); Damian Carroll (head of development & learning); Legend: (c) Captain(s); (vc) Vice-captain(s); (B) Category B rookie; italics - Inactive player list; Long-term injury; (ret.) Retired; Updated: 25 September 2026; Source(s):

=== Player selection and availability ===
Team selection of the St Kilda Football Club for the 2022 AFL season as of 29 May 2022.

Player	R1	2	3	4	5	6	7	8	9	10	11	13	14	15	16	17	18	19	20	21	22	23
Oscar Adams		s	s																			
Josh Battle	x	x	x	x	x	x	x	x	x	x	x											
Jack Billings	i	i	i	i	i	i			x	x	e											
Dan Butler	x	x	x	x	x	x	x	x	i	i	e											
Ryan Byrnes	x	x	e	m	m	e	e	e	e	m	e											
Jack Bytel	i	i	i																			
Tom Campbell	e	e			e	c	x	e														
Hunter Clark	i	i	i	i	i	i	i															
Leo Connolly				e	e																	
Nick Coffield	i	i	i	i	i	i	i	i	i	i	i	i	i	i	i	i	i	i	i	i	i	i
Brad Crouch	x	x	x	x	x	x	x	x	x	x	x											
Jarryn Geary	i			i					e													
Jade Gresham	x	x	x	x	x	x	x	x	x	x	x											
Dan Hannebery		i	i	i	i	i	i	i	i	i	i	i	i									
Jack Hayes	x	x	x	e	x	x	i	i	i	i	i	i	i	i	i	i	i	i	i	i	i	i
Max Heath						e																
Jack Higgins	x	x	x	i	x	x	x	x	x	i	c											
Bradley Hill	x	x	x	x	x	x	x	x	x	x	x											
Dougal Howard	x	c	x	x	x	x	x	x	x	x	x											
Tom Highmore		e		e	e	e	e			e												
Zak Jones	p	p	p	p		c		x	x	x	x											
Darragh Joyce		x	e					e														
Dean Kent	x		e																			
Max King	x	x	x	x	x	x	x	x	x	x	x											
Josiah Kyle																						
Jarrod Lienert	e	x	x	x	x	m	e		e	e	e											
Ben Long	e	e	m	x	x	x	x	x	x	x	x											
Rowan Marshall	x	x	x	x	x	x	i	x	x	x	x											
Matthew McLeod-Allison																						
Daniel McKenzie	x	x	x	x	x	x	x	x	x	x	x											
Tim Membrey	x	x	x	x	x	x	x	x	x	x	x											
Mitchito Owens	x						e			e	x											
Ben Paton	x	x	x	x	x	x	x	x	x	x	x											
Jack Peris																						
Seb Ross	x	x	x	x	x	x	x	x	x	x	x											
Paddy Ryder	i		x	x	s	s	x	x	x	x	x											
Cooper Sharman		m							x	x	x											
Jack Sinclair	x	x	x	x	x	x	x	x	x	x	x											
Jack Steele	x	x	x	x	x	x	x	x	x	i	i	i	i									
Nasiah Wanganeen-Milera	m	x	x	x	x	x	x	x		x	x											
Jimmy Webster	x	x	x	x	c	x	x	x	x	x	x											
Callum Wilkie	x	x	x	x	x	x	x	x	x	x	x											
Marcus Windhager				x	x	x	x	m	m	x	x											
Mason Wood	x	x	x	x	x	x	x	x	x	x	x											

Legend: x - selected; m - selected as the medical substitute; e - selected as an emergency; i - unavailable due to injury; s - unavailable due to suspension; p- unavailable due to personal leave; c- unavailable due to Health and Safety Protocols (COVID-19); blank - available but did not play
