= 2021 St Kilda Football Club season =

St Kilda Football Club
2021 season
- President: Andrew Bassat
- Coach: Brett Ratten
- Captains: Jarryn Geary; Jack Steele
- Home ground: Marvel Stadium
- Pre-season: 1–0–0
- Home and away season: 10th
- Finals series: DNQ
- Best and fairest: Jack Steele
- Leading goalkicker: Max King (38)
- Highest home attendance: 32,056 (15 April vs Richmond, Round 5)
- Lowest home attendance: 16,710 (10 April vs West Coast, Round 4)
- Average home attendance: 19,552
- Club membership: 55,802

The 2021 St Kilda Football Club season was the 123rd competing in the VFL/AFL and 137th in the club's history. Coached by Brett Ratten and co-captained by Jarryn Geary and Jack Steele, they are competed in the AFL's 2021 Premiership Season.

== Squad changes ==
=== Summary ===
The Saints finished the 2020 season with a semi-final loss to eventual 2019 premiers, Richmond, and made their first finals appearance in nine years. Following the loss, Coach Brett Ratten signalled the Saints would look to improve their midfield in the upcoming off-season after the loss to the Tigers; "we'll go for a few things in the trade period. It'd be good to get another midfielder in, that would really help us, and maybe pushing them more into the forward line so we could get some more goal-scoring power as well."

At the conclusion of the finals series, the Saints held draft picks 15, 58 (received from Sydney for a trade in 2019), 71 (received from Port Adelaide in 2019) and 87 ahead of the forthcoming trade period.

Due to the late completion of the 2020 AFL Season due to the coronavirus pandemic, the free agency, trade period and draft were delayed by approximately one month compared to previous years.

The revised dates are:

- Free agency period - 30 October–6 November 2020
- Trade period - 4–12 November 2020
- List lodgement #1 - 20 November 2020
- List lodgement #2 - 27 November 2020
- AFL and rookie drafts - week commencing 7 December 2020 (actual date TBC)
- Final list lodgement - Mid-December 2020 (actual date TBC)

=== Retirements and delistings ===
Player	Reason	Career games	Career goals	Ref
Nathan Brown	Retired	183 (53 St Kilda, 130 Collingwood)	7	
Doulton Langlands	Delisted	3	2	
Ryan Abbott	Delisted	6 (1 St Kilda, 5 Geelong)	5	
Jack Bell	Delisted	0	0	
Jack Mayo	Delisted	0	0	
Logan Austin	Delisted	20 (7 St Kilda, 13 Port Adelaide)	0	
Matthew Parker	Delisted	19	16	
Ed Philips	Delisted	15	4	
Jonathon Marsh	Delisted	26 (11 St Kilda, 15 Collingwood)	3	
Shane Savage	Delisted	165 (109 St Kilda, 56 Hawthorn)	63	

=== Free agency ===
On 21 October, Adelaide midfielder Brad Crouch nominated the Saints as his preferred destination during the Free Agency Period following a contract offer from the club. Crouch is a 'Restricted Free Agent' under AFL rules, meaning the Crows can match the contract offer from the Saints to force a trade. Crouch had also attracted interest from Geelong, Richmond and Port Adelaide, although it is understood that only the Saints were prepared to offer a five-year contract. On Sunday 1 November, the Saints lodged the paperwork for Crouch, with the Crows having three days to decide whether or not to match the bid. Adelaide stated publicly that a compensation pick of anything less than #2 in the AFL Draft would result in the Crows matching the bid to force a trade. Crouch himself spoke publicly of his desire for the Crows not to match the bid, stating that "I want them to not match. I've told St Kilda I'm fully committed to them, so I want to see that out. At this stage I just want to be at St Kilda and the decision I've made I'm fully committed to them." He officially joined the Saints after Adelaide failed to follow-through with their threat to match the bid at the deadline of 5pm on 4 November. Adelaide received draft pick number 23 as compensation.

On 6 November Shaun McKernan joined the Saints as a Free Agent following his delisting by Essendon. McKernan was courted by a number of clubs including Melbourne, but ultimately signed for the Saints. McKernan was brought in primarily as injury coverage for the Saints' forwards.

Former premiership-winning Hawthorn and Melbourne player James Frawley (nephew of former Saints captain Danny Frawley) joined the Saints as a delisted free agent on 26 November. Frawley had announced his retirement from the Hawks at the end of 2020 but was lured out of retirement and was eligible for selection as a delisted free agent following the first list lodgement on 25 November.

=== Trade period ===
Prior to the conclusion of the 2020 season, it was reported that the Saints were interested in current North Melbourne and former Western Bulldogs player Shaun Higgins as well as GWS youngster Jye Caldwell. The Saints' Shane Savage and Jack Lonie are believed to be on the radar of rival clubs and may seek trades. Chief Operating Officer Simon Lethlean said of the upcoming trade period that "it's a busy time of year and we'll be as active as we can be to find players that compliment [sic] us. We don't think we're finished with improving our list, we certainly think the five guys we all added (last off-season) have been almost in our best 10 players so if we can (find) more players that can make us better, that's our intention."

On 9 November Richmond forward-midfielder Jack Higgins requested a trade to St Kilda. The trade was ultimately completed on the final day of the trade period.

Date	Gained	Lost	Trade partner	Ref
12 November 2020	Jack Higgins; Pick 21 (Matthew Allison); Future 4th Round Pick (2021)	Pick 17 (Max Holmes); Future 2nd Round pick (2021)	Richmond	
12 November 2020	Pick 67 (unused); Pick 74 (unused)	Nicholas Hind; Pick 77 (unused)	Essendon	
9 December 2020	Pick 43 (Tom Highmore)	Pick 54 (Cody Brand); Future 4th Round Pick (2021)	Hawthorn	

=== National draft ===
At the 2020 AFL draft the Saints recruited two players, key forward Matthew Allison (first round, pick 26) and Tom Highmore (pick 45). The Saints traded pick 54 and a future fourth-rounder with Hawthorn on draft night to secure pick 45.

=== Pre-season supplemental selection period ===
In early February 2021, former North Melbourne forward Mason Wood was added to the Saints' playing group during the pre-season Supplemental Selection Period. The Saints used a second selection on 28-year old former Adelaide ruckman Paul Hunter in late February and hold one further Supplemental selection which they can use prior to round 1, or at the mid-season draft.

=== Mid-season rookie draft ===
On 2 June, the Saints' added junior ruckman Max Heath and forward Cooper Sharman at the 2021 AFL mid-season rookie draft. The Saints had a total of four available picks for the draft, but ultimately used only two.

== Pre-season ==
As with previous years, the AAMI Community Series sees many teams playing at small suburban or country venues. The Saints were due to play matches in the northern Perth suburb of Leederville and at their spiritual home of Moorabbin Oval (currently known as RSEA Park due to naming sponsorship), however, the AFL announced on 31 January that the Community Series would be revised "to protect the health and safety of the competition and the community by reducing travel ahead of the Toyota AFL Premiership Season."

=== Practice matches ===
**Rd**	**Date and local time**	**Opponent**	**Scores** (St Kilda's scores indicated in **bold**)			**Venue**	**Attendance**	**Ref.**
**Rd**	**Date and local time**	**Opponent**	Home	Away	Result	**Venue**	**Attendance**	**Ref.**
Practice	Thursday 25 February, 12pm	North Melbourne	6.13 (49)	**22.8 (140)**	Won by 91 points	Arden Street Oval (A)	TBA
1	Thursday 4 March, 7.10pm	Carlton	15.9 (99)	**19.11 (125)**	Won by 26 points	Marvel Stadium (A)	10,228

== Premiership season ==
=== Summary ===
In early January defender Dylan Roberton announced he was taking a break from his footballing duties to consider his future in football. Roberton has been attempting to make a full return to football following a collapse as a result of a heart condition in Round 4 2018. Roberton ultimately announced his retirement from the game on 6 March, stating that "I've come to a point where I need to put my family and future first...after lengthy discussions with my family and on the advice of my doctors, I've made the extremely hard decision to hang up the boots." In late January, Captain Jarryn Geary sustained a fracture to his fibula in the left leg while training. The injury will rule him out of early fixtures, but is likely to return to running and light training after six weeks of rehabilitation. It was announced in early March that Ruckman Paddy Ryder would temporarily step away from the club to spend time with his family and elders. Ryder received the full support of the club. Forward Max King was ruled out of round one following a concussion sustained while playing golf. The Round 2 game against Melbourne was named 'Spud's Game' in tribute to former Saints' Captain Danny Frawley, who died in 2019. The game focused on raising awareness and funding for mental health to '"promote a national conversation that can help lead to early intervention and fight the prevalence of mental ill-health in the community." The Saints' poor luck with injuries continued when Jade Gresham suffered a season-ending Achilles injury in the round 3 loss to Essendon. Ryder returned to the club on 6 April and will undertake a preseason-style training regimen to return to full fitness, eventually returning in Round 7.

After the Saints' round nine loss to Geelong, in a game they dominated but failed to kick accurately (5.17) from gettable shots at goal, former player and media commentator Nick Dal Santo said that

"this game is worth hundreds of millions of dollars and we're diluting it with our inability to kick goals. We’ve gone so far one particular way — we love people who can run, we love pressure. How about you kick the damn thing straight? That's a good starting point. Enough is enough....I'm emotional because (the inaccuracy) shouldn't happen at this level. This is the top one per cent of the competition that can't do the fundamentals of the game correctly. When will we learn? When will the industry learn? When will St Kilda learn? When will we give time and resources to the one part of our game that's diluting the product: Skills, but in particularly, goal kicking.

Following the Saints' shock 111-point loss to the Western Bulldogs in Round 10, the club launched an investigation. After Round 11, the Saints had four wins and six losses with the second-worst percentage in the AFL of just 72.6%, with the season to date a significant decline in performance and results following a top six finish the previous season. By Round 10, the Saints had six losses by an average of 62 points and won just two of the 20 quarters in those games. Brett Ratten said after the loss to the Bulldogs that "the gap between the best and our worst, it's just too big and it's unacceptable...it's unacceptable, and we’ve got to do something about it. We can't just keep going with this. Players that aren't performing will have to go back to the twos. We’ve got some players in pretty good form in the reserves and we'll have to make some changes, because we can't have that. [The players] were told that post-game.” Former Captain and club legend Nick Riewoldt questioned the playing group in the media, suggesting that he could tell early in the game that the players “weren't interested in the contest” and keen on treating it like “an athletics carnival” Riewoldt added that "it's not a dog-hungry group...the complete disregard or (lack of) desire to defend on four occasions now (in those heavy defeats) and give defensive effort is there for us all to see. The lack of accountability around that I think has now permeated through the group to the point where there would be a lack of trust." Brownlow Medalist Gerard Healy suggested that the team was "playing on its own terms and only playing well with effort every second week. That's the starting point, why the effort is so pathetic every second week." Following intense media coverage of the recent losses, General Manager of Football Simon Lethlean faced the media on Monday 24 May stating that:

"we had a good conversation and some open questions about how to make the program better, and that's on me that the program is not delivering at the moment...We’ve got a coach the players love and respect. There's more to all this and we’ve got to uncover what that is. This gulf between our best and worst is not good enough, and we’ve got to find a way to dig a bit deeper and get things back on track. We haven't got all the answers right now, but searching for them, and we're not in denial.”

President Andrew Basat issued a letter members on 24 May, writing that:

"losing by over 50 points for the fourth time this season in the space of 10 games is not just disappointing, but unacceptable. This is not where any of us want our club to be....Disappointingly and embarrassingly, we have failed to meet those expectations so far, with the results speaking for themselves. It is not just the win–loss margin that is of concern, but the manner in which some of these losses have occurred."

Despite the promise to make big changes ahead of the round 11 game against North Melbourne, the Saints only made two omissions (fringe players Lonie and Bytel) in addition to three forced injury changes (Clark, Frawley, McKernan). The selection decision was questioned by some in the media, particularly given one of the omissions, junior Jack Bytel, had been in good form over the past month while bigger name players who had been under scrutiny had been left in the side. Just earlier in the week, Riewoldt and Gary Lyon questioned the integrity of team selection in 2021, with Lyon adding they had set a bad precedent by continuing to name players who were out of form. Of the selection decision, Ratten explained that recent injuries had left the selection panel with little choice; "we have got three players outside of our emergencies available. One is a Category B ruckman, one is a first-year player and one is a second-year player. They (the latest injuries) all happened yesterday so it threw probably some of our plans out....There has been some harder conversations this week about making sure that their performance is to the level, otherwise maybe they are on their last chance before they get put out of the team."

In June, the club and players held a further internal review to address the disappointing efforts of the team and poor inacurracy in front of goal. With the team at 5-8 and with intense media criticism, the Saints held another 'raw' review in Sydney with coaches and players discussing the lack of effort and the need to improve in order to be a 'dynasty club'. The Saints coaches also addressed members following the Round 13 capitulation against cellar-dwellers Adelaide, after the team blew a 36-point margin in the third quarter to end up losing by six points.

Following the Round 14 bye, the Saints surprised reigning premiers Richmond, keeping them to just 22 points for the game in a 40-point win, and also scored wins over top eight sides and premiership contenders Sydney and Brisbane. After the bye, the Saints won five of the last nine games of the season. The Saints narrowly missed out on finals as a result, missing the top eight by 4 points (one win) and percentage. Of the Saints' four losses in that period, three were narrow and against top eight sides. Comparing the Saints' two halves of the season (rounds 1-13 then 14-23), the Saints lifted their scoring accuracy from 51.2% (17th in the competition) to 63.9% (1st), increased their average points for from 70.6 (16th) to 80.7 (7th), increased their ladder percentage from 78.3 (16th) to 116.4% (7th), goals per inside 50 from 16.3% (17th) to 20.4% (4th), reduced average points against from 90.2 (13th) to 69.3 (6th) and reduced inside 50s against from 54 (12th) to 47 (4th).

At the conclusion of the season, Ratten was optimistic that the Saints could return to finals in 2022:

"It's (mid-season honesty sessions) dangerous when you do it in that period and are open and honest. There is some risk with it, there's also some reward. We didn't make it (finals) and we didn't deserve to make it and some of the lessons learned will put us in good stead for the future. You can fall, but it's how high you can bounce. Maybe last year with COVID-19, Noosa (hub) and coming back and starting a bit later (in pre-season, were we up and about early? No, we weren't. As a team, we had a year we haven't enjoyed. We finished strongly in the back half of the year, but our first half wasn't that enjoyable with inconsistencies we had. So, the 'why not us' is about getting moving individually and the effect that'll have collectively."

=== Home and away season ===
Due to the Coronavirus pandemic, the AFL's announcement of the 2021 fixture was significantly delayed compared with previous years. The AFL announced the round one fixture on 20 December and a tentative full fixture on 21 December. 2021 sees the Saints play fellow 2020 finalists Richmond, Port Adelaide, Geelong and West Coast twice. The Saints will for the first time play an AFL match in Cairns, Queensland, when they host Adelaide in round 13; the game will be played place of the Saints' fixture against Port Adelaide in Shanghai, China (which it played in 2019, but was cancelled in 2020 due to the pandemic). AFL crowds were capped at 50% in Victoria for round 1, but the cap was lifted to 75% for Round 2 onwards. On 27 May the AFL and Victorian Government announced there would be no crowds for round 11 following the implementation of a seven-day COVID-19 lockdown in Melbourne. On 2 June, the Saints and Swans' Round 12 and Round 21 fixtures were swapped due to a COVID-19 outbreak in Melbourne.

**Rd**	**Date and local time**	**Opponent**	**Scores** (St Kilda's scores indicated in **bold**)			**Venue**	**Attendance**	**Ladder**	**Ref.**
**Rd**	**Date and local time**	**Opponent**	Home	Away	Result	**Venue**	**Attendance**	**Ladder**	**Ref.**
1	Sunday 21 March, 3.20pm	Greater Western Sydney	11.12 (78)	**13.8 (86)**	Won by 8 points	Sydney Showground Stadium (A)	5,014 (COVID-19 limit: 18,000)	8th
2	Saturday 27 March, 7.25pm	Melbourne	**11.7 (73)**	12.19 (91)	Lost by 18 points	Marvel Stadium (H)	25,903 (COVID-19 limit: 43,500)	10th
3	Saturday 3 April, 4.35pm	Essendon	22.11 (143)	**9.14 (68)**	Lost by 75 points	Marvel Stadium (A)	29,234 (COVID-19 limit: 43,500)	16th
4	Saturday 10 April, 4.35	West Coast	**15.12 (102)**	13.4 (82)	Won by 20 points	Marvel Stadium (H)	16,710 (COVID-19 limit: 43,500)	11th
5	Thursday 15 April, 7.20pm	Richmond	**7.6 (48)**	20.14 (134)	Lost by 86 points	Marvel Stadium (H)	32,056 (COVID-19 limit: 43,500)	13th
6	Sunday 25 April, 6.10pm	Port Adelaide	14.9 (93)	**5.9 (39)**	Lost by 54 points	Adelaide Oval (A)	33,125 (COVID-19 limit: 40,000)	16th
7	Saturday 1 May, 4.35pm	Hawthorn	**19.14 (128)**	9.5 (59)	Won by 69 points	Marvel Stadium (H)	26,433 (COVID-19 limit: 43,500)	14th
8	Saturday 8 May, 2.10pm	Gold Coast	7.12 (54)	**8.15 (63)**	Won by 9 points	Cararra Stadium (A)	9,271	11th
9	Friday 14 May, 7.50pm	Geelong	**5.17 (47)**	10.8 (68)	Lost by 21 points	Marvel Stadium (H)	26,712 (COVID-19 limit: 43,500)	11th
10	Saturday 22 May, 7.25pm	Western Bulldogs	21.18 (144)	**5.3 (33)**	Lost by 111 points	Marvel Stadium (A)	28,720 (COVID-19 limit: 43,500)	14th
11	Saturday 29 May, 4.35pm	North Melbourne	**12.16 (88)**	10.8 (68)	Won by 20 points	Marvel Stadium (H)	0 (COVID-19 limit: 0)	12th
12	Saturday 5 June, 1.45pm	Sydney	13.14 (92)	12.11 (83)	Lost by 9 points	SCG (A)	19,020	12th
13	Saturday 12 June, 7.25pm	Adelaide	**8.12 (60)**	9.12 (66)	Lost by 6 points	Cazalys Stadium (H)	5,969	13th
14	**Bye Round**							13th
15	Friday 25 June, 7.50pm	Richmond	2.10 (22)	**9.8 (62)**	Won by 40 points	MCG (A)	14,787 (COVID-19 limit: 25,000)	12th
16	Sunday 4 July, 3.20pm	Collingwood	8.13 (61)	**10.10 (70)**	Won by 9 points	MCG (A)	18,082 (COVID-19 limit: 25,000)	11th
17	Saturday 10 July, 7.25pm	Brisbane Lions	8.15 (63)	**14.11 (95)**	Won by 32 points	Cararra Stadium (A)	9,075	9th
18	Saturday 13 July, 7.25pm	Port Adelaide	**8.13 (61)**	10.14 (74)	Lost by 13 points	Marvel Stadium (H)	0 (COVID-19 limit: 0)	11th
19	Friday 23 July - Sunday 25 July	West Coast	14.10 (94)	**13.8 (86)**	Lost by 8 points	Perth Stadium (A)	43,657	12th
20	Friday 30 July, 7.50pm	Carlton	**12.9 (81)**	18.4 (112)	Lost by 31 points	Marvel Stadium (H)	0 (COVID-19 limit: 0)	13th
21	Saturday 7 August, 7.35pm	Sydney	**14.9 (93)**	10.4 (64)	Won by 29 points	Marvel Stadium (H)	0 (COVID-19 limit: 0)	11th
22	Saturday 14 August, 4.35pm	Geelong	13.7 (85)	**11.5 (71)**	Lost by 14 points	Kardinia Park (A)	0 (COVID-19 limit: 0)	12th
23	Sunday 22 August, 12.15pm	Fremantle Dockers	**17.5 (107)**	6.13 (49)	Won by 58 points	Bellerive Oval (H)	3,082	10th

=== Standings ===
Pos	Team	Pld	W	L	D	PF	PA	PP	Pts	Qualification
1	Melbourne (P)	22	17	4	1	1888	1443	130.8	70	Finals series
2	Port Adelaide	22	17	5	0	1884	1492	126.3	68	Finals series
3	Geelong	22	16	6	0	1845	1456	126.7	64	Finals series
4	Brisbane Lions	22	15	7	0	2131	1599	133.3	60	Finals series
5	Western Bulldogs	22	15	7	0	1994	1501	132.8	60	Finals series
6	Sydney	22	15	7	0	1986	1656	119.9	60	Finals series
7	Greater Western Sydney	22	11	10	1	1768	1773	99.7	46	Finals series
8	Essendon	22	11	11	0	1953	1790	109.1	44	Finals series
9	West Coast	22	10	12	0	1752	1880	93.2	40	
**10**	St Kilda	**22**	**10**	**12**	**0**	**1644**	**1796**	**91.5**	40	
11	Fremantle	22	10	12	0	1578	1825	86.5	40	
12	Richmond	22	9	12	1	1743	1780	97.9	38	
13	Carlton	22	8	14	0	1746	1972	88.5	32	
14	Hawthorn	22	7	13	2	1629	1912	85.2	32	
15	Adelaide	22	7	15	0	1616	1971	82.0	28	
16	Gold Coast	22	7	15	0	1430	1863	76.8	28	
17	Collingwood	22	6	16	0	1557	1818	85.6	24	
18	North Melbourne	22	4	17	1	1458	2075	70.3	18	

Updated to match(es) played on 21 August 2021. Source: AFL
Rules for classification: 1) points; 2) percentage; 3) number of points for.
(P) Premiers

== Post-season ==
=== Awards ===
Recipient	Award	Presented By	Notes	Ref
Max King	22Under22 (40-man Preliminary Squad)	AFL Players' Association		
Max King	Best Emerging Player	St Kilda		
Seb Ross	Life Membership	St Kilda		
Jack Sinclair	Robert Harvey Best Clubman Award	St Kilda		
Jack Steele	All Australian	AFL		
Jack Steele	Dare Sainter of the Year	St Kilda		
Jack Steele	Lenny Hayes Crest Player Award	St Kilda	Given to the Saint who best upheld the values of the club crest throughout the season	
Jack Steele	Trevor Barker Award	St Kilda	234 votes	

=== Best and fairest ===
Position	Player	Votes
1	Jack Steele	234
2	Jack Sinclair	155
3	Tim Membrey	136
4	Callum Wilkie	124
=5	Brad Crouch	120
=5	Brad Hill	120
6	Seb Ross	117
7	Dougal Howard	112
8	Jimmy Webster	105
9	Max King	101

== Players and staff ==
=== Players and coaching staff list ===
The playing squad and coaching staff of the St Kilda Football Club for the 2021 AFL season as of 10 October 2021.

St Kilda Football Club
Senior list		Rookie list	Coaching staff
1 Nick Coffield; 2 Jake Carlisle; 3 Zak Jones; 4 Jade Gresham; 5 Brad Crouch; 6 Sebastian Ross; 7 Luke Dunstan; 8 Bradley Hill; 9 Jack Steele (c); 10 Dan Hannebery; 11 Hunter Clark; 12 Max King; 13 Jack Lonie; 14 Jarryn Geary (c); 15 Jack Billings; 16 Dan Butler; 17 Dylan Roberton (ret.); 18 Paddy Ryder	19 Rowan Marshall; 20 Dougal Howard (vc); 21 Ben Long; 22 Jack Higgins; 23 Jack Bytel; 24 James Frawley; 25 Dean Kent; 26 Josh Battle; 27 Shaun McKernan; 28 Tim Membrey (vc); 29 Jimmy Webster; 30 Matthew McLeod-Allison; 31 Ryan Byrnes; 33 Ben Paton; 34 Tom Highmore; 35 Jack Sinclair; 36 Daniel McKenzie; 37 Leo Connolly	32 Mason Wood; 38 Oscar Clavarino; 39 Darragh Joyce; 41 Paul Hunter; 42 Max Heath; 43 Cooper Sharman; 44 Callum Wilkie; 45 Sam Alabakis (B)	Head coach: Brett Ratten; Assistant coaches: Brendon Lade (forwards/team offence); Aaron Hamill (backline/team defence); Adam Skrobalak (midfield); Ben McGlynn (development manager); Jake Batchelor (VFL coach/development); David Rath (head of football program); Billy Slater (leadership and development program); Jarryd Roughead (football operations assistant); Ben Robbins (Head of Mental Health and Well Being); Sean Dempster (assistant); Legend: (c) Captain(s); (vc) Vice-captain(s); (B) Category B rookie; italics - Inactive player list; Long-term injury; (ret.) Retired; Updated: 10 October 2021; Source(s):

=== Leadership group ===
The club elevated Jack Steele to the position of Co-Captain, alongside Jarryn Geary. 2020 leaders Bradley Hill and Dylan Roberton were omitted from the group, replaced by Dougal Howard and Callum Wilkie for 2021. The 2021 Leadership Group comprises:

- Jarryn Geary (co-captain)
- Jack Steele (co-captain)
- Dougal Howard (co-vice captain)
- Tim Membrey (co-vice captain)
- Seb Ross
- Jack Billings
- Callum Wilkie

=== Player selection and availability ===
Team selection of the St Kilda Football Club for the 2021 AFL season as of 22 August 2021.

Player	R1	2	3	4	5	6	7	8	9	10	11	12	13	15	16	17	18	19	20	21	22	23
Sam Alabakis																						
Josh Battle	x	x	x	x	x	x	x	x	x	x	x	x	x	x	m	m		i	i	i	i	i
Jack Billings	x	x	x	x	x	x	x	x	x	x	x	x	x	i	x	x	x	x	x	i	i	i
Dan Butler	x	x	x	x	x	x	x	x	x	x	x	x	x	x	x	x	x	x	x	x	x	x
Ryan Byrnes	i	i	i	i			x	x	x	x	x	x	x	x	x	x	x	x	x	x	x	m
Jack Bytel	x	m	e	x	x	m	x	x	x	x	e		m	i	i		m		e	m	e	x
Jake Carlisle	e	e	x	x	x	x	i	i	i	i	i	i	i	i	i	i	i	i	i	i	i	i
Hunter Clark	x	x	x	x	x	x	x	x	x	x	i	x	x	i	i	i	i	i	x	i	i	i
Oscar Clavarino											x	x	e					x			m	x
Leo Connolly										e			e	m	x	x	x	x	x	x	i	i
Nick Coffield	x	x	x	x	x	x	x	x	e		x	x	x	x	i	i	i	x	e	x	x	x
Brad Crouch	s	s	x	x	x	x	x	x	x	x	x	x	x	x	x	x	x	x	x	x	x	x
Luke Dunstan	e				x		e			e	x	x	x	x	x	x	x	x	x	x	x	e
James Frawley	i	i	i	i	i	i			x	x	i	i	i	i	i				i	i	i	i
Jarryn Geary	i	i	i	i	i	i	i	i		x	x	x	i	i	i	i	i	i	i	i	i	i
Jade Gresham	x	x	x	i	i	i	i	i	i	i	i	i	i	i	i	i	i	i	i	i	i	i
Dan Hannebery	i	i	i	i	i	i	i	i	i	i	i	i	i	i	i						x	x
Max Heath																						
Jack Higgins	x	x	x	x	x	x	x	x	x	x	x	x	x	x	x	i	i	i	x	x	x	x
Bradley Hill	x	x	x	x	x	x	x	x	x	x	x	x	x	x	x	x	x	x	x	x	x	x
Dougal Howard	x	x	x	x	x	x	x	x	x	x	x	x	x	x	x	x	x	x	x	i	x	x
Tom Highmore	x	x				e		e	x	m	x	m	x	x	x	x	x	i	x	x	i	i
Paul Hunter	x	x	e		x						e	e	x	e	e		e	x	x	e	e	x
Zak Jones	i	x	x	x	i	x	x	x	i	i	i	i	i	i	i	x	x	x	x	x	x	x
Darragh Joyce					e	x	x	x	e	e			e			e	e			x	x	i
Dean Kent	e		e					i	i	i	i	i	i	i	e	x	x	x	x	x	x	x
Max King	i	x	x	x	x	x	x	x	x	x	x	x	x	x	x	x	x	x	x	x	x	i
Ben Long	x	x	m	m	m	x		e	m		e	e	x	x	x	x	x	x	x		e	x
Jack Lonie	x	x	x	x	x	x	e	m	x	x	m	e	x	e	e	e	e	e		e		e
Rowan Marshall	i	i	i	x	i	x	x	x	x	i	i	i	i	x	x	x	x	c	x	x	x	x
Matthew McLeod-Allison																		e		e		e
Daniel McKenzie	x	e	x	x	x	x	s	i				i	i	x	x	x	x	i		x	x	x
Shaun McKernan	x	x	x	e		e	e		e	x	i	i	i	i	i	i	i	i				
Tim Membrey	x	x	x	x	x	x	x	x	x	x	x	x	o	x	x	x	x	x	x	x	x	x
Ben Paton	i	i	i	i	i	i	i	i	i	i	i	i	i	i	i	i	i	i	i	i	i	i
Seb Ross	x	x	x	x	x	x	x	o	x	x	x	x	o	x	x	x	x	x	x	x	x	x
Paddy Ryder	o	o	o	o	o		x	x	x	x	x	x	x	x	x	x	x	x	i	i	i	i
Cooper Sharman																		m	m	x	x	x
Jack Sinclair	x	x	x	x	x	x	x	x	x	x	x	x	x	x	x	x	x	x	i	x	x	x
Jack Steele	x	x	x	x	x	x	x	x	x	x	x	x	x	x	x	x	x	x	x	x	x	x
Jimmy Webster	x	x	i	x	x	i	x	x	x	x	x	x	x	x	x	x	x	x	x	x	x	x
Callum Wilkie	x	x	x	x	x	x	x	x	x	x	x	x	x	x	x	x	x	x	x	x	x	x
Mason Wood	m	e	x	e		e	m	x			x	x	x	x	x	i	i	i	i	i	i	i

Legend: x - selected; m - selected as the medical substitute; e - selected as an emergency; i - unavailable due to injury; s - unavailable due to suspension; o unavailable due to personal leave; c- unavailable due to COVID-19 isolation; blank - available but did not play
