= Paul Hunter (Australian footballer) =

Australian rules footballer

Personal information
- Born: 9 February 1993 (age 33)
- Original team: Redland Football Club
- Draft: No. 13, 2016 AFL rookie draft
- Debut: Round 1, 2021, St Kilda vs. Greater Western Sydney, at Sydney Showground Stadium
- Height: 200 cm (6 ft 7 in)
- Weight: 104 kg (229 lb)
- Position: Ruckman

Playing career
Years	Club	Games (Goals)
2016–2019	Adelaide	0 (0)
2021	St Kilda	7 (1)
Total		7 (1)

Paul Hunter (born 9 February 1993) is a former professional Australian rules footballer who played for the St Kilda Football Club in the Australian Football League (AFL).

== Early life ==
Hunter was raised in Redhead in New South Wales, near Newcastle. Hunter began playing football for Warners Bay Football club. In 2013, Hunter moved to Queensland to play with Redland in south-east Brisbane, which competed in the NEAFL. Hunter won the NEAFL Rising Star award in 2014 and was also awarded Redland's Best and Fairest, drawing the attention of AFL recruiters.

== AFL career ==
=== Adelaide Crows ===
Hunter was drafted as a 22-year-old in the 2016 AFL Rookie Draft at pick number 13 overall. He spent three years on the Crows' rookie list, but was unable to break into the senior side with Sam Jacobs and Reilly O'Brien preferred by the Crows. He was redrafted by the Crows with pick 24 in the 2018 Rookie Draft, but again failed to earn senior selection. He was again delisted at the conclusion of the 2019 season.

=== South Adelaide (SANFL) ===
Hunter signed with VFL side Williamstown in early 2020, but the season was cancelled due to the COVID-19 pandemic. He quickly moved to South Australia where he joined South Australian National Football League (SANFL) side South Adelaide. Playing alongside future St Kilda teammate Tom Highmore, Hunter had a prolific season and was named in the SANFL Team of the Year.

=== St Kilda ===
Hunter was given a second chance at AFL level by St Kilda, which selected him for the Pre-Season Supplemental Selection period in February 2021. He was invited to play in an intraclub game where he impressed in the absence of injured players Rowan Marshall, Paddy Ryder and Shaun McKernan. Hunter's performance earned him a contract at his second AFL club. He played in the Saints' two pre-season practice matches against North Melbourne and Carlton. With regular ruckmen Marshall and Ryder unavailable, he finally made his AFL debut at age 28 in the Saints' Round 1 game against the Greater Western Sydney Giants in Sydney.

In October 2021, Hunter was delisted by St Kilda.
