= Isaac Keeler =

Personal information
- Born: 23 April 2004 (age 22)
- Original teams: South Augusta (SGFL); North Adelaide (SANFL)
- Draft: No. 44, 2022 AFL draft
- Debut: Round 2, 2025, St Kilda vs. Geelong, at Docklands Stadium
- Height: 198 cm (6 ft 6 in)
- Position: Key Forward

Playing career^{1}
Years	Club	Games (Goals)
2023–2026	St Kilda	13 (11)
- ^{1} Playing statistics correct to the end of the 2026 season.

Isaac Keeler (born 23 April 2004) is a former professional Australian rules footballer who played for the St Kilda Football Club in the Australian Football League (AFL).

== Junior career ==
Keeler played local football for South Augusta in the Spencer Gulf Football League. He played SANFL Under 18s for North Adelaide.

Keeler was part of the Next Generation Academy of the Adelaide Crows, however after the Crows did not nominate him under NGA rules he entered the draft as part of the open draft pool.

== AFL career ==
Keeler was selected with pick 44 of the 2022 AFL draft. He was selected to make his debut in round 2 of the 2025 AFL season. At the end of the 2026 AFL season, Keeler was delisted by St Kilda.
