= Angus McLennan =

Personal information
- Born: 2 September 2003 (age 23)
- Original teams: Glen Iris (YJFL); Sandringham U18 (Talent League); Sandringham (VFL)
- Draft: 2023 Category B rookie signing
- Debut: 4 August 2024, St Kilda vs. Brisbane Lions, at Marvel Stadium
- Height: 188 cm (6 ft 2 in)
- Weight: 82 kg (181 lb)
- Position: Defender

Playing career
Years	Club	Games (Goals)
2023–2025	St Kilda	3 (0)

Angus McLennan (born 2 September 2003) is a former professional Australian rules footballer who played for the St Kilda Football Club in the Australian Football League (AFL).

Born in Australia and raised in Cairo, Egypt, McLennan was part of St Kilda's Next Generation Academy and was taken by the club as a Category B rookie selection at the 2023 rookie draft. He made his debut against the Brisbane Lions in Round 21 of the 2024 season, coming into the team as a late inclusion after Ryan Byrnes withdrew late, gathering 14 disposals in an 85-point loss.

McLennan spent three seasons at and played three senior matches for St Kilda before being delisted at the end of the 2025 AFL season.

== Statistics ==
Legend
G	Goals	K	Kicks	D	Disposals	T	Tackles
B	Behinds	H	Handballs	M	Marks

Season	Team	No.	Games	Totals							Averages (per game)							Votes
Season	Team	No.	Games	G	B	K	H	D	M	T	G	B	K	H	D	M	T	Votes
2024	St Kilda	41	2	0	0	14	11	25	13	2	0.0	0.0	7.0	5.5	12.5	6.5	1.0	0
2025	St Kilda	41	1	0	0	3	4	7	3	2	0.0	0.0	3.0	4.0	7.0	3.0	2.0	0
Career			3	0	0	17	15	32	16	4	0.0	0.0	5.7	5.0	10.7	5.3	1.3	0
