= Leo Connolly (Australian footballer) =

Australian rules footballer

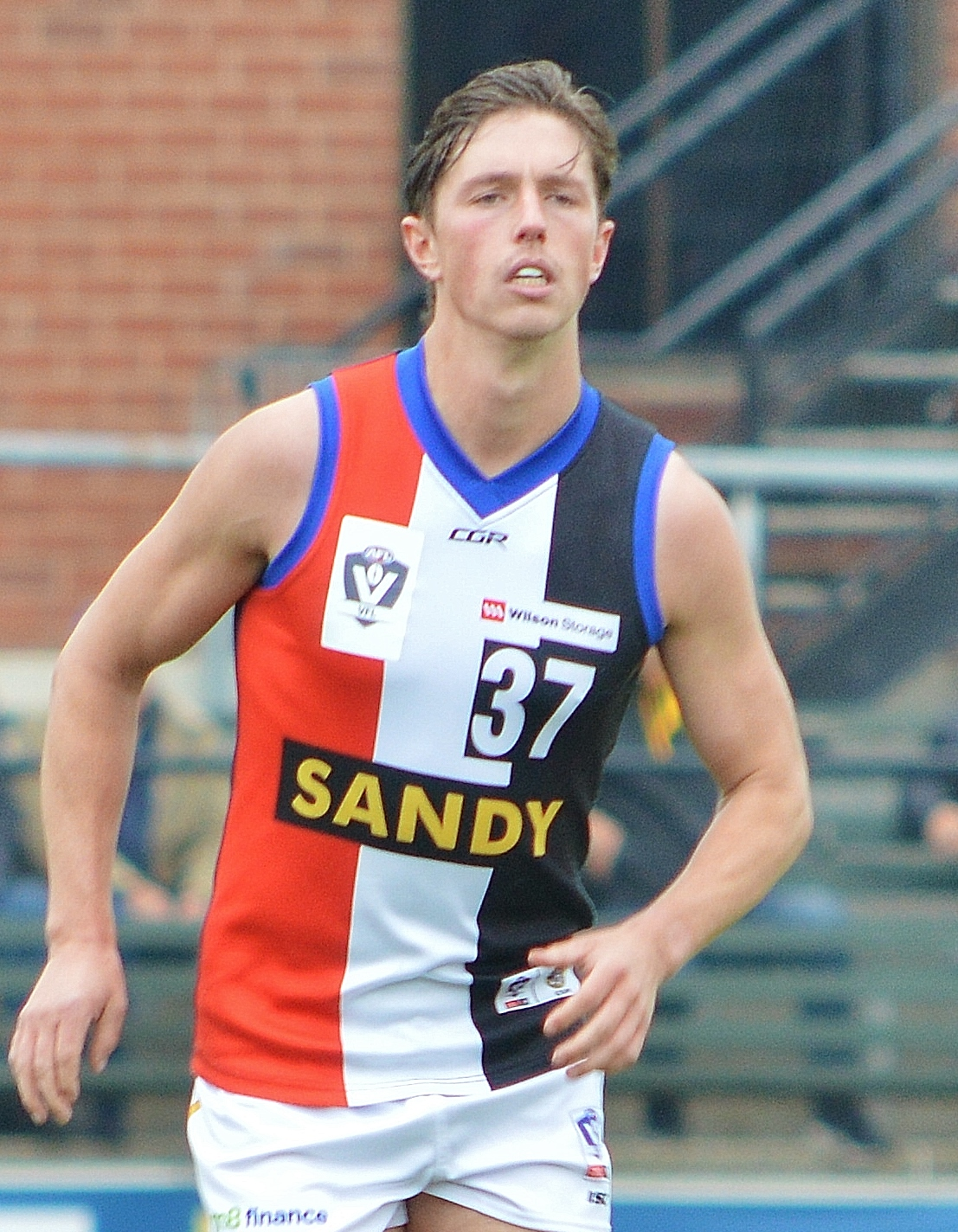
- Connolly with Sandringham in April 2021

Personal information
- Full name: Leo Connolly
- Born: 7 August 2001 (age 25)
- Original team: Gippsland Power (NAB League)
- Draft: No. 64, 2019 national draft
- Debut: 25 June 2021, St Kilda vs. Richmond, at Melbourne Cricket Ground
- Height: 181 cm (5 ft 11 in)
- Weight: 78 kg (172 lb)
- Position: Midfielder

Club information
- Current club: St Kilda
- Number: 37

Playing career^{1}
Years	Club	Games (Goals)
2020–2023	St Kilda	7 (1)
- ^{1} Playing statistics correct to the end of round 23, 2021.

Leo Connolly (born 7 August 2001) is a former Australian rules footballer who played for the St Kilda Football Club in the Australian Football League (AFL). He was recruited by St Kilda with the 64th pick in the 2019 AFL draft, and debuted for St Kilda as a medical substitute against Richmond during the 2021 AFL season.

== Early football ==
Originally hailing from the west Gippsland town of Trafalgar, Connolly began playing with the Moe Football Club in 2016, before joining the Gippsland Power in the NAB League, where he became known for his dashing run off half-back and good kicking. He was ultimately selected by the St Kilda Football Club with pick no. 64 in the 2019 AFL draft, their second and final pick.

== AFL career ==
Connolly was not able to make his debut in 2020, and in a COVID-interrupted season was largely relegated to playing scratch matches with the cancellation of the VFL following the outbreak of the pandemic. This made it difficult for Connolly to break into the senior side, who went on to make the Semi Final that year.

In 2021, minutes before St Kilda's round 15 clash with Richmond at the Melbourne Cricket Ground, Connolly replaced Nick Coffield as medical substitute, following Coffield's late inclusion in the playing 22 for Jack Billings. Connolly ultimately replaced Coffield on-field and gained 11 disposals in his first quarter of football. Following an impressive debut, Connolly retained his place in the team for seven consecutive matches before a concussion sustained in Round 21 saw him miss the final two games of the year. Connolly averaged 12 disposals, three marks, eight kicks per game in 2021, with his best game coming in Round 20 against Carlton where he had 18 disposals, 13 kicks and three marks. Connolly was delisted at the conclusion of the 2023 season.

== Statistics ==
Statistics are correct to the end of the 2021 season

Legend
G	Goals	K	Kicks	D	Disposals	T	Tackles
B	Behinds	H	Handballs	M	Marks

Season	Team	No.	Games	Totals							Averages (per game)						
Season	Team	No.	Games	G	B	K	H	D	M	T	G	B	K	H	D	M	T
2021	St Kilda	37	7	1	1	56	27	83	22	4	0.14	0.14	8.00	3.86	11.86	3.14	0.57
Career			7	1	1	56	27	83	22	4	0.14	0.14	8.00	3.86	11.86	3.14	0.57
