= Max Heath =

Australian rules footballer (born 2002)

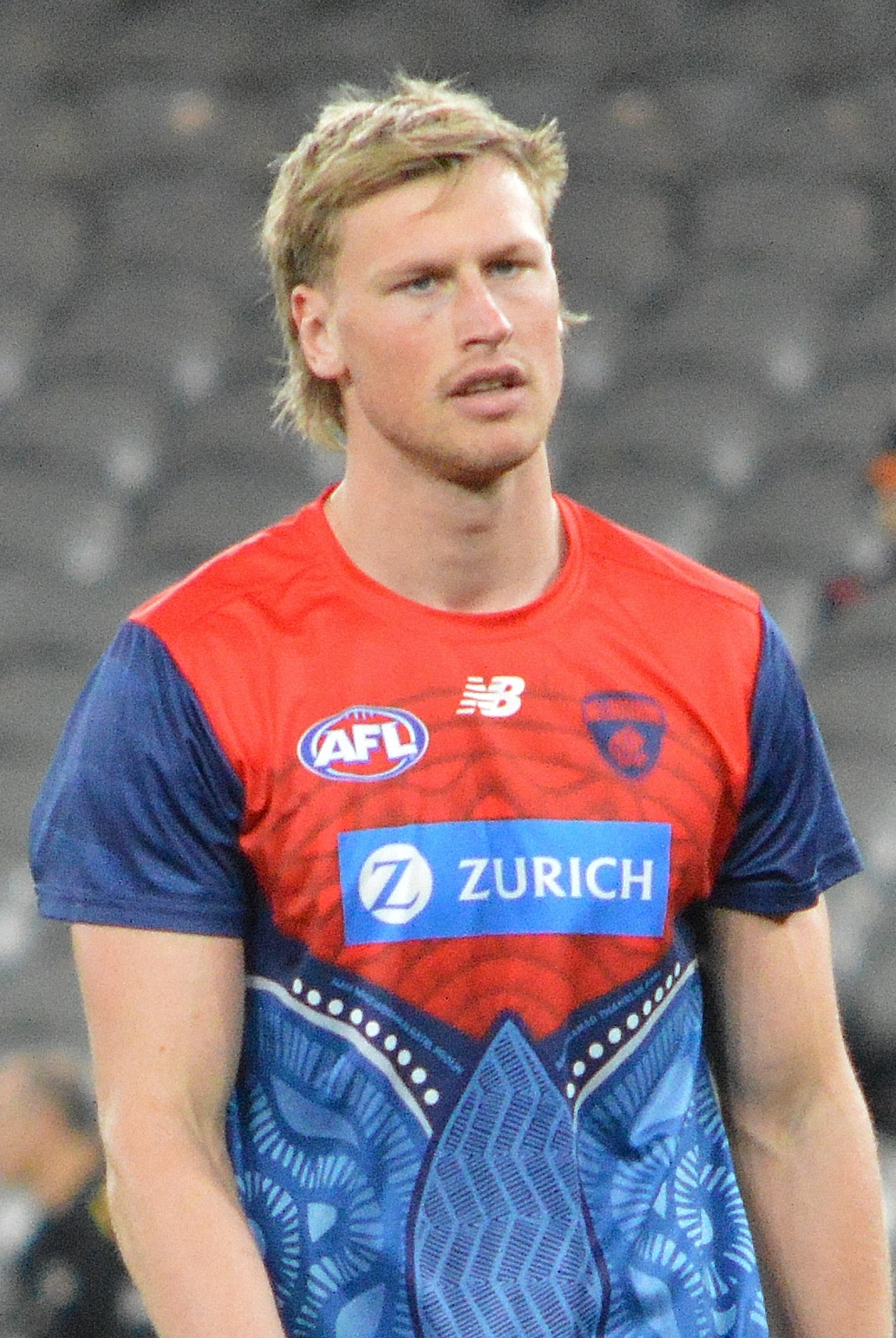
- Heath in May 2026

Personal information
- Full name: Max Heath
- Born: 24 October 2002 (age 24)
- Original team: Sandringham Dragons
- Draft: No. 7, 2021 mid-season rookie draft
- Height: 204 cm (6 ft 8 in)
- Weight: 93 kg (205 lb)
- Position: Ruckman

Club information
- Current club: Melbourne

Playing career^{1}
Years	Club	Games (Goals)
2021–2025	St Kilda	4 (3)
2026–	Melbourne	7 (2)
Total		11 (5)
- ^{1} Playing statistics correct to the end of round 22, 2026.

Max Heath (born 24 October 2002) is a professional Australian rules footballer playing for the Melbourne Football Club in the Australian Football League (AFL). Heath previously played for St Kilda, having been drafted as an 18-year-old in the 2021 Mid Season Rookie Draft.

== Early life ==
Heath is from Beaumaris in Melbourne, Victoria. Heath's father Nick was a Fitzroy-listed player and kicked over 100 goals for the Uni Blacks in 1990. As a junior, Heath played 112 games for the Beaumaris Football Club, beginning in the under 9s and playing in two premierships. Heath's favourite player as a youngster was Brisbane forward Jonathan Brown. Heath joined the Sandringham Dragons ahead of the 2019 season, but only managed one game that season given the Dragons' talented list. Instead, he played mostly with Xavier College in the APS competition. Heath re-signed with the Dragons in 2020, but due to COVID-19 there were no games that year. Heath had been tipped to play for Vic Metro in the AFL Under 18 Championships, but the pandemic saw the competition cancelled for 2020. Heath nominated for the 2020 draft, but was not selected likely due to the lack of exposure in 2020. Heath re-signed with the Dragons for 2021 and played seven games, also playing five games for Xavier College before he was drafted by St Kilda. Heath continued playing for Xavier and Sandringham as a full-time student after his listing by St Kilda. Heath had a standout game for Sandringham in Round 12 collecting 21 disposals, 26 hitouts, two goals and eight marks.

Known for his aggression and tackling pressure, Heath stated that "I just enjoy tackling and being really physical on the ground, because I know it elevates my teammates into going in harder. They know I’m going in just as hard, and hopefully I can protect them or really help them out in that sort of way. I don’t want to hurt people, [but] I want to have a real physical impact on the game and put kids into the ground. Now, I’m focused on putting men into the ground.”

== AFL career ==
Heath nominated for the 2021 Mid Season Rookie Draft and was selected by St Kilda with their first pick, number seven on 2 June. Heath was allowed to continue his year 12 studies and football at Xavier College and Sandringham for the remainder of 2021 to aid his development as junior. Heath attended some training and mentoring with Saints' ruckmen Paddy Ryder and Rowan Marshall following his listing. Heath joined on an 18-month initial contract.

Heath made his debut for St Kilda in round 18 of the 2025 AFL season. He was traded to Melbourne following the end of the season. He made his club debut for Melbourne in round 6 of the 2026 AFL season.

== Statistics ==
Updated to the end of round 22, 2026.

Legend
G	Goals	K	Kicks	D	Disposals	T	Tackles
B	Behinds	H	Handballs	M	Marks	H/O	Hit-outs

Season	Team	No.	Games	Totals								Averages (per game)								Votes
Season	Team	No.	Games	G	B	K	H	D	M	T	H/O	G	B	K	H	D	M	T	H/O	Votes
2021	St Kilda	42	0	—	—	—	—	—	—	—	—	—	—	—	—	—	—	—	—	0
2022	St Kilda	42	0	—	—	—	—	—	—	—	—	—	—	—	—	—	—	—	—	0
2023	St Kilda	42	0	—	—	—	—	—	—	—	—	—	—	—	—	—	—	—	—	0
2024	St Kilda	42	0	—	—	—	—	—	—	—	—	—	—	—	—	—	—	—	—	0
2025	St Kilda	42	4	3	3	12	15	27	7	10	35	0.8	0.8	3.0	3.8	6.8	1.8	2.5	8.8	0
2026	Melbourne	27	7	2	3	19	27	46	9	10	96	0.3	0.4	2.7	3.9	6.6	1.3	1.4	13.7	0
Career			11	5	6	31	42	73	16	20	131	0.5	0.5	2.8	3.8	6.6	1.5	1.8	11.9	0
