= Jack Peris =

Australian rules footballer (born 2003)

Personal information
- Full name: Jack Peris
- Born: 17 December 2003 (age 22)
- Original team: Sandringham Dragons (Talent League)
- Draft: 2021 category B rookie selection
- Debut: Round 18, 2023, St Kilda vs. Gold Coast, at Carrara Oval
- Height: 178 cm (5 ft 10 in)
- Weight: 74 kg (163 lb)
- Position: Wingman / forward

Club information
- Current club: Essendon reserves

Playing career^{1}
Years	Club	Games (Goals)
2022–2023	St Kilda	1 (0)
- ^{1} Playing statistics correct to the end of 2023.

Jack Peris (born 17 December 2003) played one game in the Australian Football League for the St Kilda Saints.

== AFL career ==
Having developed through St Kilda's Next Generation Academy program, Peris was signed as a rookie to the Saints prior to the 2022 season. He debuted for St Kilda in round 18, 2023 against Gold Coast at Carrara Oval. Wearing the number 45, Peris had thirteen disposals and four tackles on debut.

Peris was delisted following the conclusion of the 2023 season, having played only one game at AFL level. During 2024 and 2025, Peris played Victorian Football League (VFL) football with Essendon's reserves team.

== Personal life ==
Peris is the son of Nova Peris OAM and Daniel Batman. Both of his parents were world-class athletes who have represented Australia at the Olympics.

Peris is a descendant of the Iwatja people of Western Arnhem Land and the Yawuru and Gija people in Kimberley, Western Australia.
