= Tim Membrey =

Australian rules footballer (born 1994)

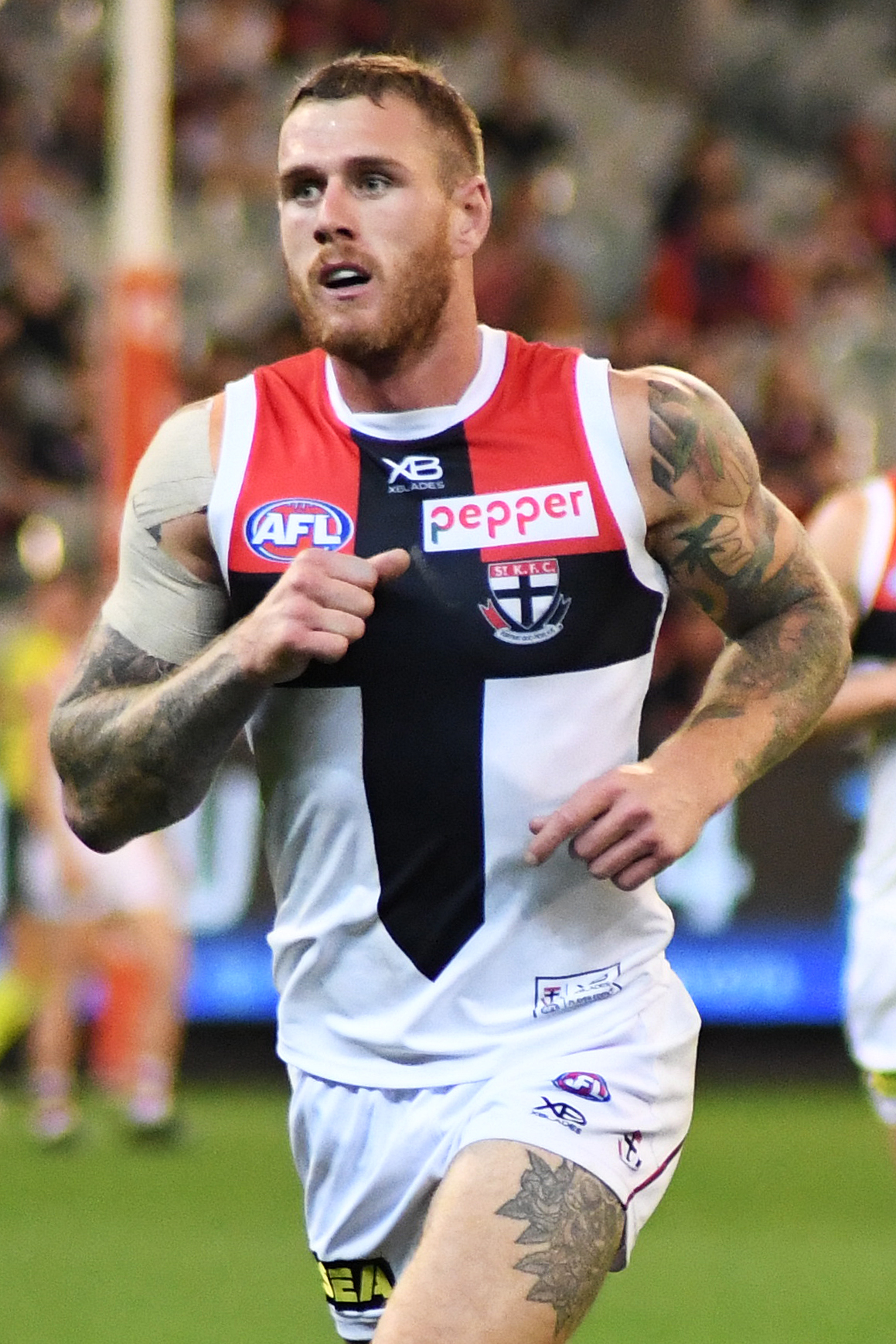
- Membrey playing for St Kilda in April 2019

Personal information
- Full name: Timothy Joel Membrey
- Nickname: Skunk
- Born: 26 May 1994 (age 32); Traralgon, Victoria, Australia
- Original team: Gippsland Power (TAC Cup)
- Draft: No. 46, 2012 national draft, Sydney
- Height: 188 cm (6 ft 2 in)
- Weight: 92 kg (203 lb)
- Position: Key forward

Club information
- Current club: Collingwood
- Number: 28

Playing career^{1}
Years	Club	Games (Goals)
2013–2014	Sydney	1 (0)
2015–2024	St Kilda	178 (293)
2025–	Collingwood	43 (65)
Total		222 (358)
- ^{1} Playing statistics correct to the end of the 2026 season.

Career highlights
- 3× St Kilda leading goalkicker: 2016, 2017, 2019; 22under22 team: 2016

Timothy Joel Membrey (born 26 May 1994) is an Australian rules footballer who plays for the Collingwood Football Club in the Australian Football League (AFL). He previously played for the Sydney Swans from 2013 to 2014 and the St Kilda Football Club from 2015 to 2024.

== Playing career ==
=== Early career ===
Membery grew up in Traralgon and attended St Gabriel's Primary School. Membrey participated in the Auskick program at Traralgon; he played junior football for Traralgon Football Club and was captain of the Gippsland Power. Membrey would play against future St Kilda teammate Jack Billings in the under 18 Grand Final, where Billings' Oakleigh Chargers won by a point.

=== Sydney Swans (2013–2014) ===
He was drafted to the Sydney Swans with the 46th pick in the 2012 AFL draft. Membrey was mentored by dual Brownlow Medalist Adam Goodes while at the Swans. Membrey had to wait until round 19, 2014 to make his debut against Essendon, when he was a late replacement for an injured Lance Franklin. In his two years in Sydney, Membrey struggled to break into a Swans lineup that included forwards Franklin, Kurt Tippett and his mentor Goodes. He played 41 games for the Swans Reserves in the North East Australian Football League, kicking 105 goals (an average of 2.5 goals per match). Following the lack of opportunities at the Swans, Membrey requested a trade to St Kilda. The two clubs could not agree on a trade and with Membrey out of contract, Sydney delisted the forward. Membrey then signed with St Kilda as a delisted free agent. On his departure, Sydney Coach John Longmire said to Membrey "we know you’re good enough to play senior football. As much as we want you, you have our blessing to leave." Saints' Chief Operating Officer Ameet Bains stated that Membrey was "a player that we liked a lot during his 2012 draft and came close to drafting."

=== St Kilda Football Club (2015–2024) ===
Membrey kicked nine goals in 12 senior games in his first season as a Saint. He debuted in round one against GWS, where he kicked two goals. At the end of the season, he injured his shoulder at training and required a shoulder reconstruction.

2016 was a breakout season for Membrey, and he was the club's leading goalkicker for the year with 44 goals in just 17 games (an average of 2.5 goals per game). The 22-year old was awarded for his good year with a 2-year contract extension.

Membrey continued his run of good form throughout 2017, playing 20 games, averaging just under 13 disposals a game and kicking 38 goals to be the Saints' leading goal-kicker for the second season in a row.

Membrey played every possible game for the Saints in 2018, the first time in his career he had played the entire season. Membrey kicked 34 goals for the year, a single goal behind the leading goal-kicker for 2018, Jade Gresham. Membrey signed a further 2-year extension at the end of the season.

Membrey was added to the five-man leadership group ahead of the 2019 season, after he began sitting in on leadership discussions towards the end of 2018. The Saints had a difficult season, registering only nine wins. Membrey kicked 44 goals, an equal career-high, and played all 22 games. Membrey's 44 goals saw him capture his third club leading-goalkicker award in four years. Membrey kicked three bags of four goals, and scored three goals in four matches.

Membrey was again part of the leadership group in 2020. In a COVID-interrupted year, Membrey played 18 of a possible 19 matches – including two finals as the Saints saw their first September action since 2011. He kicked 20 goals for the year.

Ahead of the 2021 season, Membrey was named co-vice captain alongside Dougal Howard. As he was delisted by the Swans in 2014, he was eligible for the 'free agency for life' clause in 2021. However, he immediately signed a three-year contract with the Saints through to 2024.

Membrey played a prolific game in wet, post-storm conditions in Sydney in the Saints' round-one win over GWS. He collected 21 disposals at 81 per cent efficiency, three goals, seven marks, seven inside-50s and a team-high 586 metres gained. He finished third in the 2021 Trevor Barker Award.

=== Collingwood Football Club (2025–) ===
Following the conclusion of the 2024 AFL season, Membrey was delisted by the Saints and subsequently picked up by Collingwood as a delisted free agent on a two-year contract.

Membrey had a shot on goal after the final siren to win the game for Collingwood against the Western Bulldogs in the inaugural wildcard final, but missed and kicked a behind, therefore ending Collingwood's season.

== Statistics ==
Updated to the end of round 22, 2026.

Legend
G	Goals	K	Kicks	D	Disposals	T	Tackles
B	Behinds	H	Handballs	M	Marks

Season	Team	No.	Games	Totals							Averages (per game)							Votes
Season	Team	No.	Games	G	B	K	H	D	M	T	G	B	K	H	D	M	T	Votes
2013	Sydney	1	0	—	—	—	—	—	—	—	—	—	—	—	—	—	—	0
2014	Sydney	1	1	0	0	5	4	9	4	1	0.0	0.0	5.0	4.0	9.0	4.0	1.0	0
2015	St Kilda	28	12	9	7	73	53	126	48	24	0.8	0.6	6.1	4.4	10.5	4.0	2.0	0
2016	St Kilda	28	17	44	18	149	71	220	103	27	2.6	1.1	8.8	4.2	12.9	6.1	1.6	9
2017	St Kilda	28	20	38	14	185	74	259	130	30	1.9	0.7	9.3	3.7	13.0	6.5	1.5	2
2018	St Kilda	28	20	34	28	165	82	247	132	23	1.7	1.4	8.3	4.1	12.4	6.6	1.2	4
2019	St Kilda	28	22	44	17	181	105	286	124	37	2.0	0.8	8.2	4.8	13.0	5.6	1.7	2
2020 (Note: The 2020 season was played with 17 home-and-away matches per team (down from 22) and 16-minute quarters with time on (down from 20-minute quarters with time on) due to the impact of the COVID-19 pandemic.)	St Kilda	28	18	20	9	129	55	184	83	26	1.1	0.5	7.2	3.1	10.2	4.6	1.4	0
2021	St Kilda	28	21	34	26	227	85	312	151	22	1.6	1.2	10.8	4.0	14.9	7.2	1.0	3
2022	St Kilda	28	22	34	20	212	101	313	147	27	1.5	0.9	9.6	4.6	14.2	6.7	1.2	1
2023	St Kilda	28	7	6	8	53	24	77	36	6	0.9	1.1	7.6	3.4	11.0	5.1	0.9	0
2024	St Kilda	28	19	30	9	150	71	221	98	32	1.6	0.5	7.9	3.7	11.6	5.2	1.7	1
2025	Collingwood	28	23	32	16	135	90	225	96	30	1.4	0.7	5.9	3.9	9.8	4.2	1.3	0
2026	Collingwood	28	17	30	14	119	80	199	93	16	1.8	0.8	7.0	4.7	11.7	5.5	0.9	0
Career			219	355	186	1783	895	2678	1245	301	1.6	0.8	8.1	4.1	12.2	5.7	1.4	22
