= Rowan Marshall =

Australian rules footballer

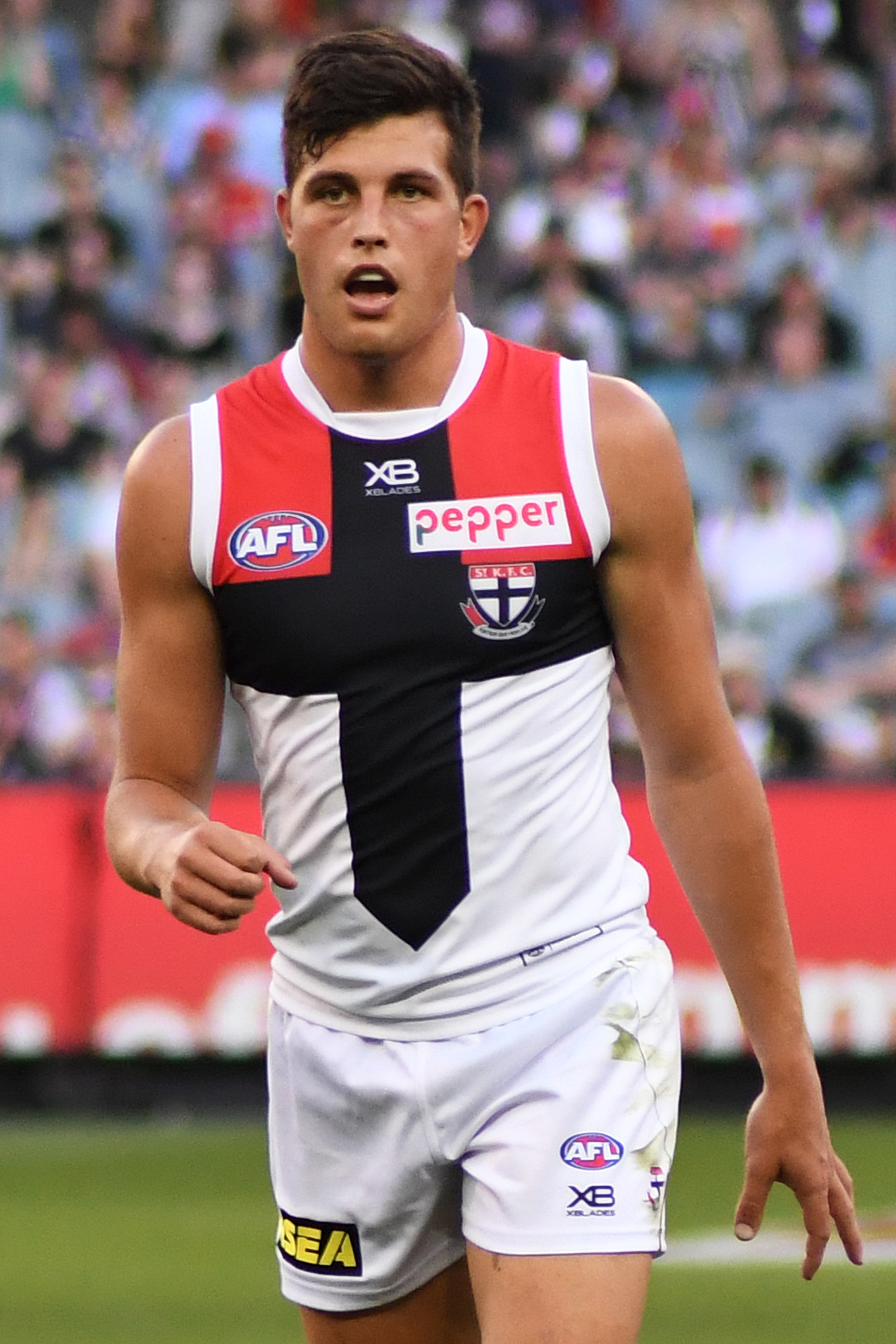
- Marshall playing for St Kilda in 2019

Personal information
- Full name: Rowan Marshall
- Born: 24 November 1995 (age 30); Taranaki, New Zealand
- Original team: North Ballarat (VFL)
- Draft: No. 10, 2017 rookie draft
- Debut: Round 18, 2017, St Kilda vs. Sydney, at Sydney Cricket Ground
- Height: 201 cm (6 ft 7 in)
- Weight: 105 kg (231 lb)
- Position: Ruck / key forward

Club information
- Current club: Geelong
- Number: 12

Playing career^{1}
Years	Club	Games (Goals)
2017–2026	St Kilda	177 (92)
2027–	Geelong	0 (0)
Total		177 (92)
- ^{1} Playing statistics correct to the end of the 2026 season.

Rowan Marshall (born 24 November 1995) is a professional Australian rules footballer playing for the Geelong Football Club in the Australian Football League (AFL). He previously played for the St Kilda Football Club from 2017 to 2026.

== Early life and career ==
Rowan Marshall was born in 1995 to mother Jan and father Don (a Taranaki rugby union player), the eldest of three brothers. Rowan moved with his parents to Queensland at the age of 18 months. At the age of 3, the family relocated to Victoria settling on a farm at Bolwarra, a few kilometres out of Portland.

Marshall participated in the Auskick program at Ballarat, Victoria As a junior, Marshall was attracted to the sport instead of his father's and cousins' preference of Rugby Union. In his penultimate year of high school at Bayview College, Marshall was invited to train with the Greater Western Victoria Rebels. Training with the rebels involved a 3-hour each way journey for Marshall, and he played seven games for the club. In 2013 he joined the Portland Tigers in the inaugural Hampden League where he played 12 under-18s matches and kicked three goals in a losing grand final. The following year in 2014 Marshall played for the North Ballarat Rebels and was included in the Vic Country team. Against the Murray Bushrangers in June Marshall was moved into the forward line in the fourth quarter to kick three important match-winning goals, and he recorded 50-plus hit-outs in two consecutive games, against Geelong Falcons and Eastern Ranges, in July. At the end of the season he was invited to the draft combine and was interviewed by several clubs. However, Marshall was not selected in the 2014 AFL draft. He continued playing in Ballarat with the North Ballarat Roosters and Ballarat league side Sebastopol, and studied at Federation University. Marshall finally met with St Kilda in 2016, who had been scouting him. Marshall was ultimately drafted in the Rookie Draft on 28 November 2016.

== AFL career ==
=== St Kilda (2017–2026) ===
Marshall was drafted by St Kilda with their first selection and tenth overall in the 2017 rookie draft. He made his St Kilda debut in the forty-two point loss to Sydney at the Sydney Cricket Ground in round eighteen of the 2017 season. At the end of the 2017 season, Marshall signed a two-year contract extension.

In the 2018 season, Marshall played 12 senior games for St Kilda and was elevated to the senior playing list following the season, having spent 2 seasons on the rookie list.

Marshall played 20 senior games in the 2019 season, averaging 29 hitouts and 18 disposals. He finished second in the club's best & fairest award, behind midfielder Seb Ross, as well as receiving the club's Lenny Hayes Players' Player Award, as voted by his teammates. Marshall also collected 7 Brownlow Medal votes in 2019, as well as being acknowledged by Champion Data as the most improved player in the AFL based on statistics.

Marshall was partnered in the ruck with Paddy Ryder for the 2020 season, after playing predominantly as a sole ruckman the previous season. In a COVID-limited season, Marshall played a key role in the Saints' reaching finals for the first time since 2011, playing all 19 possible games which included two finals.

Marshall suffered a stress injury in his foot ahead of the 2021 season, and missed the first three matches of the year. Marshall returned to the side in the Round Four win over West Coast, but missed the Saints' Round Five loss to Richmond due to a five-day break with the Saints' medical staff recommending a cautious approach following a plantar fascia injury in the West Coast game. Marshall returned in Round 6 and played four games before further injuring his plantar fascia and undergoing surgery. Marshall made his return from injury in Round 15. Marshall and teammate Darragh Joyce were forced into isolation after they attended a Wallabies game which turned out to be a COVID-19 hotspot. As a result, Marshall, who had flown to Perth, missed the Saints' Round 19 clash with West Coast which St Kilda lost by eight points. Marshall returned the following week, after completing isolation, and played in the Saints' final four games of the season. In his return against Carlton in Round 20, Marshall had 46 hitouts, five tackles, one goal and 22 disposals. Marshall also impressed with 22 disposals and two goals against Fremantle in Round 23.

Following the 2025 AFL season, Marshall requested a trade to Geelong, despite being contracted at St Kilda until 2027. St Kilda and Geelong failed to reach a deal on the trade period's deadline day, and Marshall remained at St Kilda.

=== Geelong (2027–) ===
After re-requesting a move the following year, Marshall was finally traded to Geelong during the 2026 trade period.

== Personal life ==
Marshall was born in New Zealand to Kiwi parents but moved to a 40-hectare property in Portland, Victoria at a young age. His father Don played rugby in the Taranaki region, and worked at the Portland wharf as well as on the family farm. Marshall's cousins, Rhys Marshall and Callum Gibbins, are both professional rugby union players. During the COVID-19 hiatus of the AFL season in 2020, Marshall assisted his family run their 320 head of cattle farm.

== Statistics ==
Updated to the end of round 22, 2026.

Legend
G	Goals	K	Kicks	D	Disposals	T	Tackles
B	Behinds	H	Handballs	M	Marks	H/O	Hit-outs

Season	Team	No.	Games	Totals								Averages (per game)								Votes
Season	Team	No.	Games	G	B	K	H	D	M	T	H/O	G	B	K	H	D	M	T	H/O	Votes
2017	St Kilda	43	1	0	0	5	9	14	4	2	5	0.0	0.0	5.0	9.0	14.0	4.0	2.0	5.0	0
2018	St Kilda	43	12	6	13	85	75	160	67	28	113	0.5	1.1	7.1	6.3	13.3	5.6	2.3	9.4	0
2019	St Kilda	19	20	8	2	198	157	355	83	69	569	0.4	0.1	9.9	7.9	17.8	4.2	3.5	28.5	7
2020 (Note: The 2020 season was played with 17 home-and-away matches per team (down from 22) and 16-minute quarters with time on (down from 20-minute quarters with time on) due to the impact of the COVID-19 pandemic.)	St Kilda	19	19	13	11	193	74	267	83	40	284	0.7	0.6	10.2	3.9	14.1	4.4	2.1	14.9	8
2021	St Kilda	19	13	9	5	137	66	203	63	39	241	0.7	0.4	10.5	5.1	15.6	4.8	3.0	18.5	4
2022	St Kilda	19	21	9	7	218	118	336	97	66	484	0.4	0.3	10.4	5.6	16.0	4.6	3.1	23.0	3
2023	St Kilda	19	24	8	8	314	179	493	126	115	639	0.3	0.3	13.1	7.5	20.5	5.3	4.8	26.6	3
2024	St Kilda	19	23	15	8	341	136	477	134	99	608	0.7	0.3	14.8	5.9	20.7	5.8	4.3	26.4	16
2025	St Kilda	19	23	10	13	262	165	427	103	107	627	0.4	0.6	11.4	7.2	18.6	4.5	4.7	27.3	2
2026	St Kilda	19	19	12	12	182	151	333	81	49	277	0.6	0.6	9.6	7.9	17.5	4.3	2.6	14.6	0
Career			175	90	79	1935	1130	3065	841	614	3847	0.5	0.5	11.1	6.5	17.5	4.8	3.5	22.0	43
