= Tom Highmore =

Australian rules footballer (born 1998)

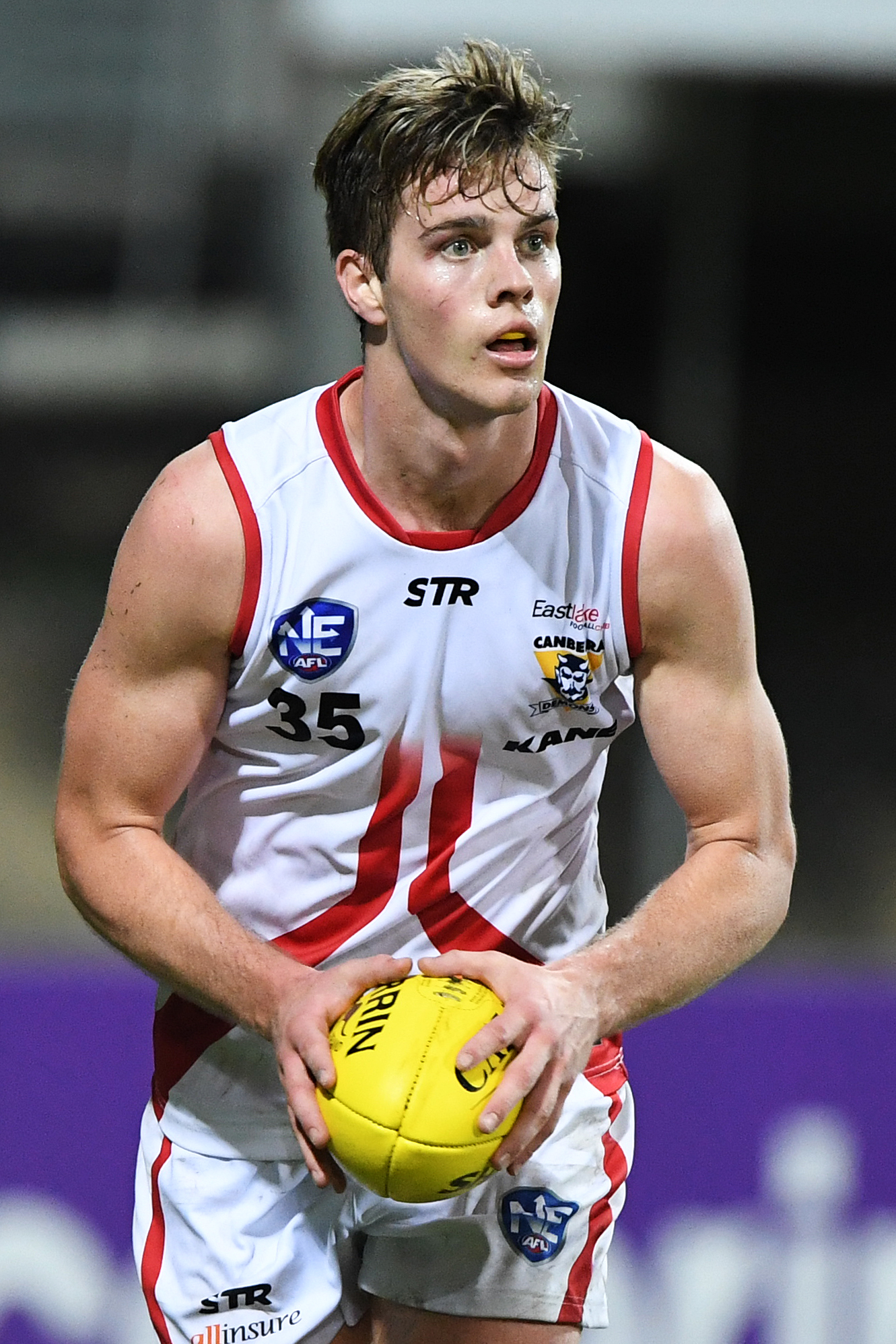
- Highmore in 2019

Personal information
- Full name: Thomas Highmore
- Born: 24 February 1998 (age 28); Canberra
- Original team: South Adelaide
- Draft: No. 45, 2020 AFL national draft
- Debut: Round 1, 2021, St Kilda vs. Greater Western Sydney, at Sydney Showground Stadium
- Height: 193 cm (6 ft 4 in)
- Weight: 89 kg (196 lb)
- Position: Defender

Playing career^{1}
Years	Club	Games (Goals)
2021-2023	St Kilda	16 (0)
Total		16 (0)
- ^{1} Playing statistics correct to the end of 2023 season.

Tom Highmore (born 24 February 1998) is a former professional Australian rules footballer who played for the St Kilda Football Club in the Australian Football League (AFL). He was drafted as a 22-year-old in the 2020 AFL draft at pick number 45 overall.

== Early life ==
Highmore was raised in the Canberra suburb of Tuggeranong and played the Tuggeranong Lions as a junior, winning a premiership with his under 12s side which was coached by his father. Highmore then played several seasons for the Tuggeranong Hawks before moving to Marist College where he was eventually recruited to NEAFL side Eastlake during his year 11 schooling. In 2016 Highmore was eligible to be drafted by GWS via their Academy (where he also trained with fellow Academy prospect and future St Kilda teammate Jack Steele), but was ultimately overlooked. Highmore continued at Eastlake which became the Canberra Demons (where he became Vice Captain) and was named in the 2019 NEAFL Team of the Year.

Highmore moved to Adelaide in 2020 to play for SANFL side South Adelaide to improve his chances of being drafted by an AFL side. Highmore debuted for the Panthers in Round 1 at Adelaide Oval. He averaged 22.6 disposals through his first six league games and took at least 10 marks three times. Highmore had a standout game in the Round 4 win over Sturt, where he gathered 27 disposals, 11 marks (including two contested marks), laid five tackles, sent the ball inside 50 on six occasions, and contributed eight rebounds.

== AFL career ==
Highmore was selected with St Kilda's second draft pick, number 45 overall in the 2020 AFL Draft. St Kilda traded pick 54 and future fourth-rounder to Hawthorn on draft night to upgrade their pick to number 45.

In his first pre-season, coach Brett Ratten described Highmore as "nearly a Wilkie clone in the way he goes about it, but he's a right-footer and he played exceptionally well mopping up. He kicks the ball well, he's brave, he's a good size… so whether he's a second-tall defender, or third, he's sort of in that category." Highmore was selected to make his debut in St Kilda's Round 1 clash with GWS, a coincidence for Highmore who had originally been part of the Giants' Academy. Highmore played round two against Melbourne, but was dropped and did not return until round nine. He was committed to the medical-substitute role for round 10. Highmore returned to play seven straight games, including an impressive performance in the round 13 loss to Adelaide where he had 22 disposals, 15 intercepts and 12 marks (8 intercepts).

Highmore was delisted at the conclusion of the 2023 season, having played 16 senior games for St Kilda.

== Statistics ==
Statistics are correct to the end of 2023 season

Legend
G	Goals	K	Kicks	D	Disposals	T	Tackles
B	Behinds	H	Handballs	M	Marks

Season	Team	No.	Games	Totals							Averages (per game)						
Season	Team	No.	Games	G	B	K	H	D	M	T	G	B	K	H	D	M	T
2021	St Kilda	34	13	0	0	97	75	172	66	31	0	0	7.5	5.8	13.2	5.1	2.4
2022	St Kilda	34	3	0	0	26	17	43	17	3	0	0	8.7	5.7	14.3	5.7	1.0
2023	St Kilda	34	0	-	-	-	-	-	-	-	-	-	-	-	-	-	-
Career			16	0	0	123	92	215	83	34	0	0	7.7	5.8	13.4	5.2	2.1
