= List of St Kilda Football Club leading goalkickers =

The following is a list of St Kilda Football Club leading goalkickers in each season of the Australian Football League (AFL), formerly known as the Victorian Football League (VFL), and the AFL Women's (AFLW). Bill Mohr holds the record for most times as the club's leading goalkicker, accomplishing this on 12 consecutive seasons from 1929 to 1940. He also kicked the most goals in the 1936 VFL Season with 101, the first St Kilda player to kick 100 goals or more in a season. Tony Lockett holds the record for most goals kicked in a season by a St Kilda player, kicking 137 in 1992. He also won the Coleman Medal twice, in 1987 and 1991, and has kicked the most career goals of any St Kilda player, totalling 898. Lockett kicked an additional 462 goals for the Sydney Swans and is the record holder for most career goals of any VFL/AFL player.

== St Kilda leading goalkickers ==
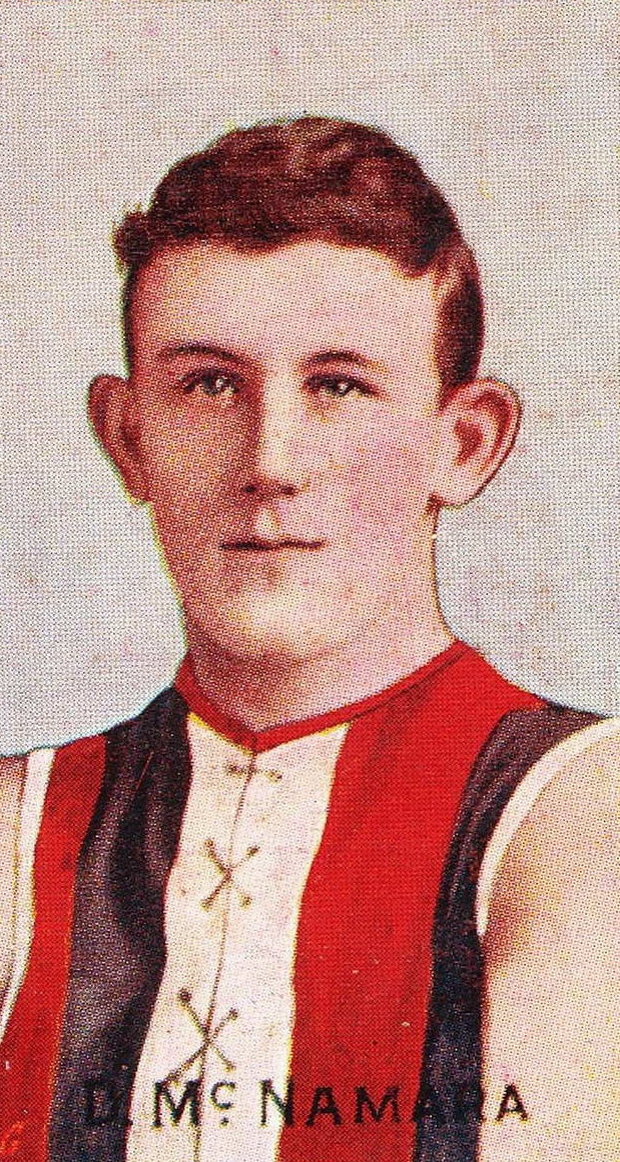
Dave McNamara led St Kilda's goalkicking on four separate occasions from 1906 to 1918. McNamara was nicknamed "Long Dave" due to his booming drop kicks and place kicks, including a record-setting 85-metre place kick in one game. He was an inaugural member of St Kilda's Hall of Fame and the Australian Football Hall of Fame.

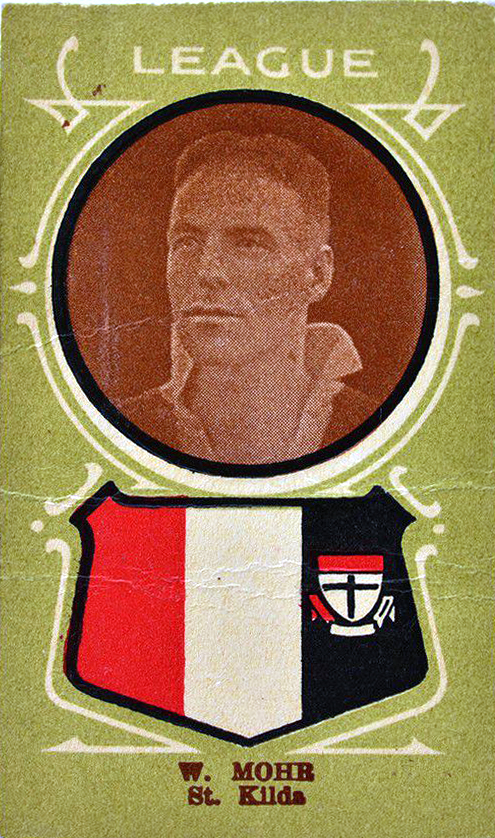
Bill Mohr holds St Kilda's all-time record for leading goalkicker awards, recording 12 successive awards from 1929–1940, including a 101-goal haul for the 1936 season. It took until Tony Lockett in 1987, 51 years later, before another St Kilda player would kick 100+ goals in a season.

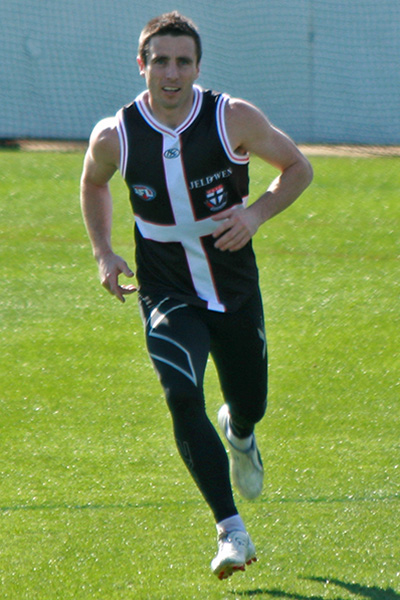
Somewhat unusually for a leading goalkicker, Stephen Milne topped St Kilda's leading goalkicker tally on four separate occasions (2002–2012) as a forward pocket

^	Denotes current St Kilda player
+	Player won Coleman/Leading Goalkicker Medal in same season
†	Team played finals (which count for the tally)

Season	Player	Goals
1897	Reg Stewart	6
1897	Bill Ahern	6
1898	Andy Stewart	23
1899	Andy Stewart (2)	16
1900	George Sutherland	14
1901	Cecil Sandford	9
1902+	Charlie Baker	30
1903	Charlie Baker (2)	22
1904	Charlie Baker (3)	30
1905	Charlie Baker (4)	19
1906	Dave McNamara	23
1907	Jim Stewart	21†
1907	Dave McNamara (2)	21†
1908	Jim Stewart (2)	28†
1909	Vic Barwick	16
1910	Artie Thomas	15
1911	Ernie Sellars	22
1912	Ernie Sellars (2)	44
1913	Ernie Sellars (3)	53†
1914	Dave McNamara (3)	48
1915	Harry Moyes	32
1918	Les Boyd	17†
1918	Dave McNamara (4)	17†
1919	Jack James	12
1920	Jack James (2)	13
1921	Harry Moyes	30
1922	Harry Moyes (2)	23
1923	Harry Moyes (3)	29
1924	Jack James (3)	28
1925	Jack Shelton	42
1926	Jack Shelton (2)	47
1927	Jack Shelton (3)	24
1928	Bert Smedley	50
1929	Bill Mohr	38†
1930	Bill Mohr (2)	83
1931	Bill Mohr (3)	57
1932	Bill Mohr (4)	68
1933	Bill Mohr (5)	74
1934	Bill Mohr (6)	66
1935	Bill Mohr (7)	83
1936+	Bill Mohr (8)	101
1937	Bill Mohr (9)	58
1938	Bill Mohr (10)	34
1939	Bill Mohr (11)	47†
1940	Bill Mohr (12)	25
1941	Bob Flegg	47
1942	Frank Kelly	21
1943	Jack Connelly	27
1944	Sam Loxton	52
1945	Jim Hall	21
1945	Sam Snell	21
1946	Sam Loxton (2)	40
1947	Peter Bennett	37
1948	Peter Bennett (2)	32
1949	Jack McDonald	33
1950	Peter Bennett (3)	59
1951	Peter Bennett (4)	47
1952	Jack McDonald (2)	31
1953	Peter Bennett (5)	36
1954	Jim Ross	34
1955	Jack McDonald (3)	24
1956+	Bill Young	56
1957	Bill Young (2)	60
1958	Bill Young (3)	56
1959	Bill Young (4)	45
1960	Bill Young (5)	37
1961	Ian Rowland	26†
1962	Darrel Baldock	33
1963	Darrel Baldock (2)	36†
1964	Darrel Baldock (3)	29
1965	Darrel Baldock (4)	44†
1966	Kevin Neale	55†
1967	Kevin Neale (2)	37
1968	Kevin Neale (3)	32†
1969	Kevin Neale (4)	50
1970	Barry Breen	35†
1971	Allan Davis	70†
1972	John Stephens	53†
1973	Allan Davis (2)	49†
1974	Bruce Duperouzel	28
1975	George Young	53
1976	George Young (2)	52
1977	George Young (3)	58
1978	George Young (4)	70
1979	Garry Sidebottom	56
1980	Mark Scott	48
1981	Con Gorozidis	34
1982	Mark Scott (2)	45
1983	Mark Jackson	41
1984	Tony Lockett	77
1985	Tony Lockett (2)	79
1986	Tony Lockett (3)	60
1987+	Tony Lockett (4)	117
1988	Nicky Winmar	43
1989	Tony Lockett (5)	78
1990	Tony Lockett (6)	65
1991+	Tony Lockett (7)	127†
1992	Tony Lockett (8)	132†
1993	Tony Lockett (9)	53
1994	Tony Lockett (10)	56
1995	Stewart Loewe	76
1996	Stewart Loewe (2)	90
1997	Jason Heatley	73†
1998	Jason Heatley (2)	48†
1999	Barry Hall	41
2000	Peter Everitt	40
2001	Barry Hall (2)	44
2002	Stephen Milne	50
2003	Fraser Gehrig	55
2004+	Fraser Gehrig (2)	103†
2005+	Fraser Gehrig (3)	78†
2006	Fraser Gehrig (4)	71†
2007	Fraser Gehrig (5)	59
2008	Nick Riewoldt	65†
2009	Nick Riewoldt (2)	78†
2010	Stephen Milne (2)	57†
2011	Stephen Milne (3)	56†
2012	Stephen Milne (4)	56
2013	Nick Riewoldt (3)	50
2014	Nick Riewoldt (4)	49
2015	Josh Bruce	50
2016	Tim Membrey	44
2017	Tim Membrey (2)	38
2018	Jade Gresham	35
2019	Tim Membrey (3)	44
2020	Dan Butler^	29†
2021	Max King^	38
2022	Max King^ (2)	52
2023	Jack Higgins^	36†
2024	Jack Higgins^ (2)	36
2025	Jack Higgins^ (3)	46
2026	Liam Ryan^	33

=== Multiple winners ===
Player	Wins	Seasons
Bill Mohr	12	1929, 1930, 1931, 1932, 1933, 1934, 1935, 1936, 1937 , 1938, 1939, 1940
Tony Lockett	10	1984, 1985, 1986, 1987, 1989, 1990, 1991, 1992, 1993, 1994
Peter Bennett	5	1947, 1948, 1950, 1951, 1953
Bill Young	5	1956, 1957, 1958, 1959, 1960
Fraser Gehrig	5	2003, 2004, 2005, 2006, 2007
Charlie Baker	4	1902, 1903, 1904, 1905
Dave McNamara	4	1906, 1907, 1914, 1918
Darrel Baldock	4	1962, 1963, 1964, 1965
Kevin Neale	4	1966, 1967, 1968, 1969
George Young	4	1975, 1976, 1977, 1978
Stephen Milne	4	2002, 2010, 2011, 2012
Nick Riewoldt	4	2008, 2009, 2013, 2014
Tim Membrey	3	2016, 2017, 2019
Jack Higgins	3	2023, 2024, 2025
Barry Hall	2	1999, 2001
Max King	2	2021, 2022

=== Leading career goalkickers ===
Player	goals	Average
Tony Lockett	898	4.91
Bill Mohr	735	3.77
Nick Riewoldt	718	2.14
Stewart Loewe	594	1.85
Stephen Milne	574	2.09
Fraser Gehrig	390	2.69

=== Most goals in a game ===
Goals	Player	Opponent	Round	Year	Venue
15.4	Tony Lockett	Sydney	13	1992	Moorabbin Oval
13.3	Tony Lockett	Carlton	21	1991	Waverley Park
12.6	Tony Lockett	Adelaide	7	1991	Moorabbin Oval
12.3	Tony Lockett	Brisbane Bears	10	1992	Moorabbin Oval
12.3	Tony Lockett	West Coast	9	1989	Moorabbin Oval
12.3	Tony Lockett	Melbourne	4	1987	MCG
12.2	Tony Lockett	Sydney	9	1991	SCG
11.2	Tony Lockett	Sydney	7	1994	SCG
11.1	Tony Lockett	Brisbane Bears	11	1993	Waverley Park
11.1	Tony Lockett	Sydney	24	1991	Moorabbin Oval
11.0	Stephen Milne	Brisbane Lions	22	2005	Docklands
11.0	Bill Mohr	North Melbourne	6	1936	Junction Oval
11.0	Bill Mohr	Collingwood	17	1931	Junction Oval

== AFL Women's leading goalkickers ==
^	Denotes current St Kilda player
+	Player won Leading Goalkicker Medal in same season
†	Team played finals (which count for the tally)

Season	Player(s)	Total
2020	Caitlin Greiser+	10
2021	Caitlin Greiser (2)	9
2022 (S6)	Nicola Xenos^	6
2022 (S7)	Kate Shierlaw	13
2023	Nat Exon	9
2024	Jesse Tawhiao-Wardlaw^	14
2025	Jesse Tawhiao-Wardlaw^ (2)	14†

== See also ==
- St Kilda Football Club Honour Roll
