= List of St Kilda Football Club individual honours =

The following is a list of AFL/VFL individual honours, which have been awarded to players or coaches of the St Kilda Football Club.

== Trevor Barker Award ==
An individual player award under various headings such as "champion player" and later "best and fairest" has been made since about 1914. In the late 1990s the club named the award the Trevor Barker Award to honour the name and memory of Trevor Barker, a former St Kilda player and reserves coach.

The person who has won the most St Kilda best and fairest awards:

- Nick Riewoldt: 2002, 2004, 2006, 2007, 2009, 2014

== Brownlow Medal ==
The Brownlow Medal is awarded to the "best and fairest" player in the Australian Football League (AFL) during the regular season (i.e., not including finals matches) as determined by votes cast by the officiating umpires after each game. It is the most prestigious award for individual players in the AFL. It is also widely acknowledged as the highest individual honour in the sport of Australian rules football.

- Robert Harvey, 1997 and 1998
- Tony Lockett, 1987
- Ian Stewart, 1965 and 1966
- Ross Smith, 1967
- Verdun Howell, 1959
- Neil Roberts, 1958
- Brian Gleeson, 1957
- Colin Watson, 1925

== Norm Smith Medal ==
- Lenny Hayes, 2010 (first Grand Final)

== Michael Tuck Medal ==
Since 1992, the Michael Tuck Medal has been awarded to the player adjudged best on ground during the AFL Cup Final held before the Premiership season begins each year. Three St Kilda Football Club players have won it.

- Jason Gram: 2008
- Robert Harvey: 2004
- Nicky Winmar: 1996

== Leigh Matthews Trophy ==
The Leigh Matthews Trophy is awarded by the AFL Players Association to the player voted the most valuable during the year, the award has been given out ever since Leigh Matthews first won it in 1982.

- Nick Riewoldt, 2004
- Robert Harvey, 1997
- Tony Lockett, 1987

== Coleman Medal ==
The Coleman Medal is awarded to the leading goal scorer in the league in the home and away season. Prior to 1955 the league's leading goal scorer was awarded the Leading Goalkicker Medal.

- Fraser Gehrig, 2004 and 2005
- Tony Lockett, 1987 and 1991
- Bill Young, 1956
- Bill Mohr, 1936
- Charlie Baker, 1902

== AFL Rising Star ==
The AFL Rising Star award is given to a young player considered to have significantly improved during the year. Every round, an Australian Football League rising star nomination is given to a standout young player. To be eligible for the award, a player must be under 21 on 1 January of that year, have played 10 or fewer senior games before the beginning of the season, and not have been suspended during the season.

- Nick Riewoldt, 2002
- Justin Koschitzke, 2001

== Australian Football Hall of Fame ==
The Australian Football Hall of Fame was established in 1996, the centenary year of the Australian Football League, to help recognise the contributions made to the sport of Australian rules football by players, umpires, media personalities, coaches and administrators. As of 2015, the following sixteen former players and coaches who served at least part of their career at St Kilda have been inducted into the AFL's Hall of Fame, with five players elevated to the top status of 'Legend', reserved for approximately 10% of the total Hall of Fame.

- Darrel Baldock, legend
- Roy Cazaly, legend
- Alex Jesaulenko, legend
- Tony Lockett, legend
- Ian Stewart, legend
- Vic Cumberland
- Carl Ditterich
- Wels Eicke
- Les Foote
- Robert Harvey
- Allan Jeans (inducted as coach)
- Dave McNamara
- Bill Mohr
- Neil Roberts
- Ross Smith
- Colin Watson
