= 2015 St Kilda Football Club season =

St Kilda Football Club
2015 season
- Coach: Alan Richardson
- Captain: Nick Riewoldt
- Home ground: Etihad Stadium (Capacity: 56,347)

The 2015 St Kilda Football Club season was the 119th in the club's history. Coached by Alan Richardson and captained by Nick Riewoldt, they competed in the AFL's 2015 Toyota Premiership Season.

== List changes ==
The following summarises all player changes between the conclusion of the 2014 season and the commencement of the 2015 season.

In:

| Player | From | via | Ref. |
|---|---|---|---|
| Tim Membrey | Sydney Swans | Delisted free agent |
| Paddy McCartin | Geelong Falcons (TAC Cup) | Pick #1, National Draft |
| Hugh Goddard | Geelong Falcons (TAC Cup) | Pick #21, National Draft |
| Daniel McKenzie | Oakleigh Chargers (TAC Cup) | Pick #22, National Draft |
| Jack Lonie | Dandenong Stingrays (TAC Cup) | Pick #41, National Draft |
| Jack Sinclair | Oakleigh Chargers (TAC Cup) | Pick #1, Rookie Draft |
| Ahmed Saad | Unattached | Pick #19, Rookie Draft |
| Brenton Payne | Western Jets (TAC Cup) | Pick #37, Rookie Draft |

Out:

| Player | To | via | Ref. |
|---|---|---|---|
| Rhys Stanley | Geelong Cats | Trade |
| James Gwilt | Essendon | Delisted free agent |
| Clinton Jones | Sandringham (VFL) | Delisted |
| Trent Dennis-Lane | Sandringham (VFL) | Delisted |
| Sam Dunell | Williamstown (VFL) | Delisted |
| Lenny Hayes | Unattached | Retired |
| Beau Maister | Unattached | Retired |

== Season summary ==
=== Pre-season matches ===
The first two practice matches were played as part of the 2015 NAB Challenge, and were played under modified pre-season rules, including nine-point goals. The final practice match was not part of the NAB Challenge, and was played under premiership season rules.

| **Rd** | **Date and local time** | **Opponent** | **Scores** (St Kilda's scores indicated in **bold**) | | | **Venue** | **Attendance** |
| **Rd** | **Date and local time** | **Opponent** | Home | Away | Result | **Venue** | **Attendance** |
| 1 | Saturday, 28 February (3:10 pm) | Brisbane Lions | 0.7.16 (58) | **0.8.7 (55)** | Lost by three points | Moreton Bay Central Sports Complex (A) | 6,200 |
| 2 | Saturday, 7 March (4:40 pm) | Essendon | 0.8.3 (51) | **0.15.11 (101)** | Won by 50 points | Morwell Recreation Reserve (A) | |
| 3 | Thursday, 19 March (7:10 pm) | Hawthorn | **1.4.6 (39)** | 0.22.13 (145) | Lost by 106 points | Etihad Stadium (H) | 7,077 |

=== Premiership Season ===
==== Home and away season ====
| **Rd** | **Date and local time** | **Opponent** | **Scores** (St Kilda's scores indicated in **bold**) | | | **Venue** | **Attendance** | **Ladder** **position** |
| **Rd** | **Date and local time** | **Opponent** | Home | Away | Result | **Venue** | **Attendance** | **Ladder** **position** |
| 1 | Sunday, 5 April (1:10 pm) | Greater Western Sydney | **11.12 (78)** | 12.15 (87) | Lost by 9 | Etihad Stadium (H) | 18,794 | 12th |
| 2 | Saturday, 11 April (6.20 pm) | Gold Coast | 10.16 (76) | **16.8 (104)** | Won by 28 | Metricon Stadium (A) | 13,649 | 8th |
| 3 | Friday, 17 April (7.50 pm) | Collingwood | 21.14 (140) | **10.6 (66)** | Lost by 74 | MCG (A) | 45,197 | 14th |
| 4 | Saturday, 25 April (1.10 pm) | Carlton | **12.9 (81)** | 18.13 (121) | Lost by 40 | Westpac Stadium (H) | 12,125 | 14th |
| 5 | Sunday, 3 May (3.20 pm) | Essendon | **11.14 (80)** | 11.16 (82) | Lost by 2 | Etihad Stadium (H) | 29,869 | 16th |
| 6 | Saturday, 9 May (2.10 pm) | Western Bulldogs | 13.9 (87) | **14.10 (94)** | Won by 7 | Etihad Stadium (A) | 29,619 | 14th |
| 7 | Saturday, 16 May (1.15 pm) | Adelaide | 18.13 (119) | **10.13 (73)** | Lost by 46 points | Adelaide Oval (A) | 43,532 | 14th |
| 8 | Saturday, 23 May (1.45 pm) | West Coast | **12.6 (78)** | 20.11 (131) | Lost by 53 | Etihad Stadium (H) | 23,598 | 15th |
| 9 | Sunday, 31 May (1.10 pm) | Brisbane Lions | 13.8 (86) | **16.12 (108)** | Won by 22 | Gabba (A) | 16,898 | 14th |
| 10 | Sunday, 7 June (4.40 pm) | Hawthorn | **10.9 (69)** | 20.12 (132) | Lost by 63 | Etihad Stadium (H) | 33,886 | 14th |
| 11 | Sunday, 14 June (4.40 pm) | Melbourne | **12.13 (85)** | 12.11 (83) | Won by 2 points | Etihad Stadium (H) | 25,217 | 14th |
| 12 | Bye | | | | | | | 14th |
| 13 | Saturday, 27 June (7.20 pm) | Western Bulldogs | **7.14 (56)** | 9.8 (62) | Lost by 6 points | Etihad Stadium (H) | 26,511 | 14th |
| 14 | Sunday, 5 July (1.10 pm) | Essendon | 8.4 (52) | **25.12 (162)** | Won by 110 points | Etihad Stadium (A) | 38,120 | 13th |
| 15 | Sunday, 12 July (1.10 pm) | Greater Western Sydney | 12.12 (84) | **6.13 (49)** | Lost by 35 | Spotless Stadium (A) | 9,178 | 13th |
| 16 | Sunday, 19 July (4.40 pm) | Richmond | **10.13 (73)** | 13.11 (89) | Lost by 16 | Etihad Stadium (H) | 45,722 | 13th |
| 17 | Sunday, 26 July (3.20 pm) | Melbourne | 6.10 (46) | **12.11 (83)** | Won by 37 | MCG (A) | 22,945 | 13th |
| 18 | Sunday, 2 August (12.40 pm) | Port Adelaide | 17.10 (112) | **6.13 (49)** | Lost by 63 | Adelaide Oval (A) | 36,850 | 13th |
| 19 | Sunday, 9 August (4.40 pm) | Fremantle | 8.11 (59) | **15.6 (96)** | Lost by 37 | Etihad Stadium (H) | 16,409 | 13th |
| 20 | Saturday, 15 August (2.10 pm) | North Melbourne | **18.12 (120)** | 11.17 (83) | Lost by 37 | Blundstone Arena (A) | 14,346 | 13th |
| 21 | Saturday, 22 August (7.20 pm) | Geelong | 14.13 (97) | 15.7 (97) | Draw | Etihad Stadium (H) | 25,245 | 13th |
| 22 | Sunday, 30 August (3.20 pm) | Sydney | 4.14 (38) | **20.15 (135)** | Lost by 97 | Etihad Stadium (H) | 27,856 | 13th |
| 23 | Saturday, 5 September (5.40 pm) | West Coast | **18.17 (125)** | 4.6 (30) | Lost by 95 | Domain Stadium (A) | 36,165 | 14th |

== Ladder ==
2015 AFL ladder
| Pos | Team | Pld | W | L | D | PF | PA | PP | Pts | |
|---|---|---|---|---|---|---|---|---|---|---|
| 1 | Fremantle | 22 | 17 | 5 | 0 | 1857 | 1564 | 118.7 | 68 | Finals series |
| 2 | West Coast | 22 | 16 | 5 | 1 | 2330 | 1572 | 148.2 | 66 | Finals series |
| 3 | Hawthorn (P) | 22 | 16 | 6 | 0 | 2452 | 1548 | 158.4 | 64 | Finals series |
| 4 | Sydney | 22 | 16 | 6 | 0 | 2006 | 1578 | 127.1 | 64 | Finals series |
| 5 | Richmond | 22 | 15 | 7 | 0 | 1930 | 1568 | 123.1 | 60 | Finals series |
| 6 | Western Bulldogs | 22 | 14 | 8 | 0 | 2101 | 1825 | 115.1 | 56 | Finals series |
| 7 | Adelaide | 21 | 13 | 8 | 0 | 2107 | 1821 | 115.7 | 54 (Note: The round 14 match between Adelaide and Geelong was cancelled due to the death of Adelaide coach Phil Walsh, and both teams were awarded two premiership points each.) | Finals series |
| 8 | North Melbourne | 22 | 13 | 9 | 0 | 2062 | 1937 | 106.5 | 52 | Finals series |
| 9 | Port Adelaide | 22 | 12 | 10 | 0 | 2002 | 1874 | 106.8 | 48 | |
| 10 | Geelong | 21 | 11 | 9 | 1 | 1853 | 1833 | 101.1 | 48 | |
| 11 | Greater Western Sydney | 22 | 11 | 11 | 0 | 1872 | 1891 | 99.0 | 44 | |
| 12 | Collingwood | 22 | 10 | 12 | 0 | 1972 | 1856 | 106.3 | 40 | |
| 13 | Melbourne | 22 | 7 | 15 | 0 | 1573 | 2044 | 77.0 | 28 | |
| 14 | St Kilda | 22 | 6 | 15 | 1 | 1695 | 2162 | 78.4 | 26 | |
| 15 | Essendon | 22 | 6 | 16 | 0 | 1580 | 2134 | 74.0 | 24 | |
| 16 | Gold Coast | 22 | 4 | 17 | 1 | 1633 | 2240 | 72.9 | 18 | |
| 17 | Brisbane Lions | 22 | 4 | 18 | 0 | 1557 | 2306 | 67.5 | 16 | |
| 18 | Carlton | 22 | 4 | 18 | 0 | 1525 | 2354 | 64.8 | 16 | |

Rules for classification: 1) points; 2) percentage; 3) number of points for.
(P) Premiers

== Awards, records and milestones ==
=== Milestones ===
- Round 1:
  - Jack Lonie – AFL debut
  - Tim Membrey – first game for St Kilda (previously Sydney Swans)
- Round 2:
  - Sam Fisher – 200th AFL game
- Round 3:
  - Patrick McCartin – AFL debut

== Brownlow Medal ==
=== Results ===
| Round | 1 vote | 2 votes | 3 votes |
|---|---|---|---|
| 1 | | | |
| 2 | | | |
| 3 | | | |
| 4 | | | |
| 5 | | | |
| 6 | | | |
| 7 | | | |
| 8 | | | |
| 9 | | | |
| 10 | | | |
| 11 | | | |
| 12 | | | |
| 13 | | | |
| 14 | | | |
| 15 | | | |
| 16 | | | |
| 17 | | | |
| 18 | | | |
| 19 | | | |
| 20 | | | |
| 21 | | | |
| 22 | | | |
| 23 | | | |

=== Brownlow Medal tally ===
| Player | 1 vote games | 2 vote games | 3 vote games | Total votes |
|---|---|---|---|---|
| Total | | | | |

- italics denotes ineligible player

== Tribunal cases ==
| Player | Round | Charge category (Level) | Verdict | Result | Victim | Club | Ref(s) |
