= 2017 St Kilda Football Club season =

St Kilda Football Club
2017 season
- President: Matt Finnis
- Coach: Alan Richardson (4th season)
- Captain: Jarryn Geary (1st season)
- Home ground: Etihad Stadium (Capacity: 53,347)
- AFL season: 11th

The 2017 St Kilda Football Club season was the 121st in the club's history. Coached by Alan Richardson and captained by Jarryn Geary, they competed in the AFL's 2017 Toyota Premiership Season.

== Squad ==
St Kilda Football Club
Senior list		Rookie list	Coaching staff
1 Tom Hickey; 2 Jake Carlisle; 3 Jack Steven; 4 Jade Gresham; 5 Shane Savage; 6 Sebastian Ross; 7 Luke Dunstan; 8 Blake Acres; 9 Jack Steele; 10 Nathan Freeman; 11 Leigh Montagna; 12 Nick Riewoldt; 13 Jack Lonie; 14 Jarryn Geary (c); 15 Jack Billings; 16 Jack Newnes; 17 Dylan Roberton; 18 Billy Longer; 19 Sam Gilbert; 20 David Armitage	21 Ben Long; 22 Nathan Brown; 23 Hugh Goddard; 24 Sean Dempster (ret); 25 Koby Stevens; 26 Josh Battle; 27 Josh Bruce; 28 Tim Membrey; 29 Jimmy Webster; 30 Ed Phillips; 31 Brandon White; 32 Paddy McCartin; 34 Nathan Wright; 35 Jack Sinclair; 36 Daniel McKenzie; 37 Bailey Rice; 41 Darren Minchington; 42 Lewis Pierce; 44 Maverick Weller; 45 Jason Holmes	33 Nick O'Kearney; 38 Nick Coughlan; 39 Darragh Joyce (B); 40 Ray Connellan (B); 43 Rowan Marshall	Head coach: Alan Richardson; Assistant coaches: Danny Sexton (director of coaching and strategy); Aaron Hamill (forwards); Rohan Welsh (defense); Adam Kingsley (midfield); Adam Skrobalak (ruck); Simon McPhee (head of development); Peta Searle (development); Ben McGlynn (development); Danny Frawley (specialist defensive coach); Lindsay Gilbee (Sandringham VFL coach); Robbie Chancellor (manager of performance analysis); Legend: (c) Captain(s); (vc) Vice-captain(s); (B) Category B rookie; (ret) retired; Updated: 6 April 2017; Source(s): Playing list, Coaching staff

== Season summary ==
=== Pre-season ===
**Rd**	**Date and local time**	**Opponent**	**Scores** (St Kilda's scores indicated in **bold**)			**Venue**	**Attendance**
**Rd**	**Date and local time**	**Opponent**	Home	Away	Result	**Venue**	**Attendance**
1	Thursday 23 February, 7:40pm	Port Adelaide	**0.8.9 (57)**	0.7.14 (56)	Won by 1 point	Etihad Stadium (H)	5,363
2	Saturday 4 March, 2:05pm	Carlton	0.4.6 (30)	**0.18.14 (122)**	Won by 92 points	Ikon Park (A)	15,485
3	Sunday 12 March, 7:10pm	Sydney	**0.10.14 (74)**	0.11.11 (77)	Lost by 3 points	Lavington Sports Ground (A)	6,893

=== Regular season ===
**Rd**	**Date and local time**	**Opponent**	**Scores** (St Kilda's scores indicated in **bold**)			**Venue**	**Attendance**	**Ladder**	**Ref.**
**Rd**	**Date and local time**	**Opponent**	Home	Away	Result	**Venue**	**Attendance**	**Ladder**	**Ref.**
1	Saturday, 25 March (4:35 pm)	Melbourne	**13.12 (90)**	17.8 (110)	Lost by 20 points	Etihad Stadium (H)	36,249	13th
2	Saturday, 1 April (4:40 pm)	West Coast	18.8 (116)	**13.19 (97)**	Lost by 19 points	Domain Stadium (A)	37,749	13th
3	Sunday, 9 April (1:10 pm)	Brisbane Lions	**14.23 (107)**	11.10 (76)	Won by 31 points	Etihad Stadium (H)	23,097	10th
4	Sunday, 16 April (3:20 pm)	Collingwood	7.13 (55)	**9.15 (69)**	Won by 14 points	Etihad Stadium (A)	36,650	10th
5	Sunday, 23 April (3:20 pm)	Geelong	**13.10 (88)**	19.12 (126)	Lost by 38 points	Etihad Stadium (H)	33,884	11th
6	Saturday, 29 April (1:45 pm)	Hawthorn	8.7 (55)	**19.16 (130)**	Won by 75 points	University of Tasmania Stadium (A)	15,571	9th
7	Friday, 5 May (7:50 pm)	Greater Western Sydney	**16.12 (108)**	12.13 (85)	Won by 23 points	Etihad Stadium (H)	21,160	8th
8	Saturday, 13 May (2:10 pm)	Carlton	**12.13 (85)**	10.6 (66)	Won by 19 points	Etihad Stadium (H)	38,014	6th
9	Saturday, 20 May (1:45 pm)	Sydney	**10.8 (68)**	18.10 (118)	Lost by 50 points	Etihad Stadium (H)	29,778	9th
10	Saturday, 27 May (1:45 pm)	Western Bulldogs	13.12 (90)	**7.8 (50)**	Lost by 40 points	Etihad Stadium (A)	34,685	10th
11	Bye							11th
12	Friday, 9 June (7:20 pm)	Adelaide	16.15 (111)	**7.12 (54)**	Lost by 57 points	Adelaide Oval (A)	46,082	12th
13	Friday, 16 June (7:50 pm)	North Melbourne	10.12 (72)	**12.17 (89)**	Won by 17 points	Etihad Stadium (A)	26,107	10th
14	Sunday, 25 June (4:40 pm)	Gold Coast	**14.20 (104)**	10.12 (72)	Won by 32 points	Etihad Stadium (H)	15,844	8th
15	Sunday, 2 July (2:40 pm)	Fremantle	12.8 (80)	**12.17 (89)**	Won by 9 points	Domain Stadium (A)	30,541	8th
16	Saturday, 8 July (7:25 pm)	Richmond	**21.12 (138)**	10.11 (71)	Won by 67 points	Etihad Stadium (H)	47,514	7th
17	Friday, 14 July (7:50 pm)	Essendon	**7.15 (57)**	17.16 (118)	Lost by 61 points	Etihad Stadium (H)	47,156	9th
18	Saturday, 22 July (7:25 pm)	Sydney	14.17 (101)	**9.5 (59)**	Lost by 42 points	SCG (A)	35,773	11th
19	Saturday, 29 July (4:05 pm)	Port Adelaide	9.9 (63)	**8.13 (61)**	Lost by 2 points	Adelaide Oval (A)	30,335	11th
20	Sunday, 6 August (1:10 pm)	West Coast	**15.13 (103)**	14.11 (95)	Won by 8 points	Etihad Stadium (H)	22,688	11th
21	Sunday, 13 August (1:10 pm)	Melbourne	14.12 (96)	**10.12 (72)**	Lost by 24 points	MCG (A)	53,115	11th
22	Sunday, 20 August (3:20 pm)	North Melbourne	**18.19 (127)**	12.6 (78)	Won by 49 points	Etihad Stadium (H)	29,126	10th
23	Sunday, 27 August (3:20 pm)	Richmond	19.8 (122)	**12.9 (81)**	Lost by 41 points	MCG (A)	69,104	11th

== Ladder ==
Pos	Team	Pld	W	L	D	PF	PA	PP	Pts	Qualification
1	Adelaide	22	15	6	1	2415	1776	136.0	62	2017 finals
2	Geelong	22	15	6	1	2134	1818	117.4	62	2017 finals
3	Richmond (P)	22	15	7	0	1992	1684	118.3	60	2017 finals
4	Greater Western Sydney	22	14	6	2	2081	1812	114.8	60	2017 finals
5	Port Adelaide	22	14	8	0	2168	1671	129.7	56	2017 finals
6	Sydney	22	14	8	0	2093	1651	126.8	56	2017 finals
7	Essendon	22	12	10	0	2135	2004	106.5	48	2017 finals
8	West Coast	22	12	10	0	1964	1858	105.7	48	2017 finals
9	Melbourne	22	12	10	0	2035	1934	105.2	48	
10	Western Bulldogs	22	11	11	0	1857	1913	97.1	44	
11	St Kilda	22	11	11	0	1925	1986	96.9	44	
12	Hawthorn	22	10	11	1	1864	2055	90.7	42	
13	Collingwood	22	9	12	1	1944	1963	99.0	38	
14	Fremantle	22	8	14	0	1607	2160	74.4	32	
15	North Melbourne	22	6	16	0	1983	2264	87.6	24	
16	Carlton	22	6	16	0	1594	2038	78.2	24	
17	Gold Coast	22	6	16	0	1756	2311	76.0	24	
18	Brisbane Lions	22	5	17	0	1877	2526	74.3	20	

Source: AFL
Rules for classification: 1) points; 2) percentage; 3) number of points for.
(P) Premiers
