= Con Gorozidis =

Australian rules footballer and cricketer

Personal information
- Full name: Con Gorozidis
- Born: 20 September 1961 (age 65)
- Original team: Caulfield (VFA)
- Height: 183 cm (6 ft 0 in)
- Weight: 86 kg (190 lb)
- Position: Forward

Playing career^{1}
Years	Club	Games (Goals)
1980–1982	St Kilda	29 (64)
1983	Footscray	5 (10)
Total		34 (74)
- ^{1} Playing statistics correct to the end of 1983.

Career highlights
- St Kilda leading goalkicker: 1981

Con Gorozidis (born 20 September 1961) is a former Australian rules footballer who played for St Kilda and Footscray in the Victorian Football League (VFL).

Gorozidis was a leading junior player with the East Brighton Football Club and had made his senior football debut at only sixteen with Victorian Football Association (VFA) side Caulfield. He was recruited by St Kilda where he made his senior VFL debut in round 8, 1980, against Geelong Football Club at Geelong's home ground, Kardinia Park. Gorozidis was St Kilda Football Club leading goalkicker in 1981, with 34 goals, but he played only one more season with St Kilda before transferring to rival VFL club Footscray for the 1983 VFL season.

Gorozidis played only one season with Footscray before returning to the VFA with Sandringham Football Club playing in the 1985 premiership.

After moving on from Sandringham Goro returned to East Brighton where he played in a premierships with mate John Bennett. Other clubs Con played for include Hampton Park, Bentleigh, Hampton Hammers and Murrumbeena.

He was also a successful cricketer, playing for over 30 years for the Brighton Union Cricket Club in the City of Moorabbin Cricket Association.
