= Jack McDonald (Australian footballer) =

Australian rules footballer (1930–2022)

Personal information
- Full name: Jack McDonald
- Born: 28 January 1930
- Died: 7 May 2022
- Original team: Camden
- Height: 180 cm (5 ft 11 in)
- Weight: 76 kg (168 lb)
- Position: Forward

Playing career^{1}
Years	Club	Games (Goals)
1948–1956	St Kilda	113 (133)
- ^{1} Playing statistics correct to the end of 1956.

Career highlights
- St Kilda leading goalkicker: 1949, 1952, 1955

Jack McDonald (28 January 1930 – 7 May 2022) was an Australian rules footballer who played for the St Kilda Football Club.

A left-footed forward from Camden, he played for the Saints from 1949 to 1956.

He was St Kilda's leading goal-kicker in 1949, 1952 and 1955.

McDonald was captain-coach of Wangaratta in 1957 and 1958, leading them to the 1957 Ovens & Murray Football League premiership and winning the 1958 O&MFL goalkicking award with 68 goals.
