= 1902 VFL season =

Sixth season of the Victorian Football League (VFL)

1902 VFL premiership season
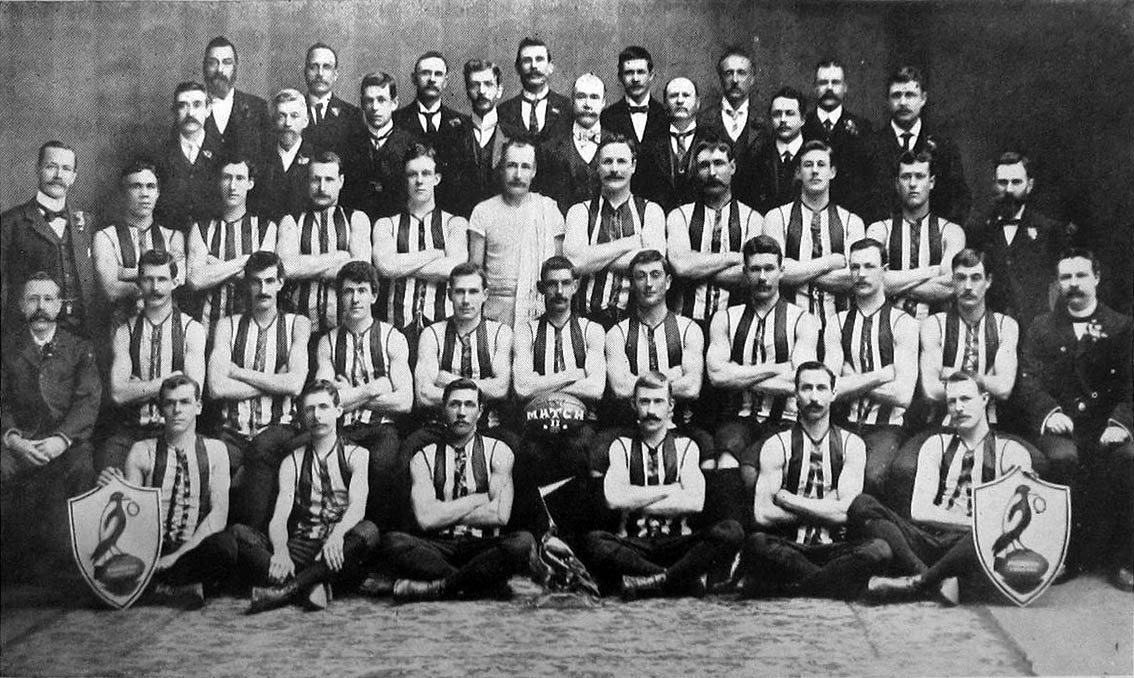
- Collingwood 1902 VFL premiership team
- Date: 3 May – 20 September 1902
- Teams: 8
- Premiers: Collingwood; 1st premiership
- Minor premiers: Collingwood; 1st minor premiership
- Leading goalkicker medallist: Charlie Baker (St Kilda); 30 goals
- Matches played: 72

The 1902 VFL season was the sixth season of the Victorian Football League (VFL), the highest-level senior Australian rules football competition in Victoria. The season featured eight clubs and ran from 3 May to 20 September, comprising a 17-round home-and-away season followed by a three-week finals series featuring the top four clubs.

Collingwood won the premiership, defeating Essendon by 33 points in the 1902 VFL grand final; it was Collingwood's first VFL premiership. Collingwood also won the minor premiership by finishing atop the home-and-away ladder with a 15–2 win–loss record. St Kilda's Charlie Baker won the leading goalkicker medal as the league's leading goalkicker.

== Background ==
In 1902, the VFL competition consisted of eight teams of 18 on-the-field players each, with no "reserves", although any of the 18 players who had left the playing field for any reason could later resume their place on the field at any time during the match.

Each team played each other twice in a home-and-away season of 14 rounds. Then, based on ladder positions after those 14 rounds, three further 'sectional rounds' were played, with the teams ranked 1st, 3rd, 5th and 7th playing in one section and the teams ranked 2nd, 4th, 6th and 8th playing in the other.

Once the 17 round home-and-away season had finished, the 1902 VFL Premiers were determined by the specific format and conventions of the amended Argus system.

== Home-and-away season ==
=== Round 1 ===
| | Round 1 |
| Saturday, 3 May (3:00 pm) | Carlton 6.4 (40) | def. by | Geelong 11.12 (78) | Princes Park |
| Saturday, 3 May (3:00 pm) | South Melbourne 3.7 (25) | def. by | Collingwood 5.13 (43) | Lake Oval |
| Saturday, 3 May (3:00 pm) | Essendon 5.9 (39) | def. by | Fitzroy 7.10 (52) | East Melbourne Cricket Ground |
| Saturday, 3 May (3:00 pm) | Melbourne 15.15 (105) | def. | St Kilda 7.9 (51) | Melbourne Cricket Ground |

=== Round 2 ===
| Home team | Home team score | Away team | Away team score | Venue | Date |
|---|---|---|---|---|---|
| St Kilda | 5.6 (36) | Fitzroy | 14.20 (104) | Junction Oval | 10 May 1902 |
| Geelong | 3.6 (24) | Essendon | 10.17 (77) | Corio Oval | 10 May 1902 |
| Melbourne | 4.10 (34) | Collingwood | 8.3 (51) | MCG | 10 May 1902 |
| South Melbourne | 8.13 (61) | Carlton | 0.8 (8) | Lake Oval | 10 May 1902 |

=== Round 3 ===
| Home team | Home team score | Away team | Away team score | Venue | Date |
|---|---|---|---|---|---|
| Fitzroy | 8.10 (58) | South Melbourne | 8.4 (52) | Brunswick Street Oval | 17 May 1902 |
| Essendon | 7.6 (48) | Melbourne | 3.7 (25) | EMCG | 17 May 1902 |
| Collingwood | 11.15 (81) | Geelong | 3.2 (20) | Victoria Park | 17 May 1902 |
| St Kilda | 2.13 (25) | Carlton | 4.9 (33) | Junction Oval | 17 May 1902 |

=== Round 4 ===
| Home team | Home team score | Away team | Away team score | Venue | Date |
|---|---|---|---|---|---|
| Geelong | 11.11 (77) | St Kilda | 5.3 (33) | Corio Oval | 24 May 1902 |
| Essendon | 5.8 (38) | South Melbourne | 4.11 (35) | EMCG | 24 May 1902 |
| Collingwood | 3.4 (22) | Fitzroy | 7.13 (55) | Victoria Park | 24 May 1902 |
| Carlton | 6.13 (49) | Melbourne | 8.12 (60) | Princes Park | 24 May 1902 |

=== Round 5 ===
| Home team | Home team score | Away team | Away team score | Venue | Date |
|---|---|---|---|---|---|
| Geelong | 5.14 (44) | South Melbourne | 3.9 (27) | Corio Oval | 31 May 1902 |
| Fitzroy | 7.17 (59) | Melbourne | 6.10 (46) | Brunswick Street Oval | 31 May 1902 |
| St Kilda | 5.5 (35) | Collingwood | 5.12 (42) | Junction Oval | 31 May 1902 |
| Essendon | 7.16 (58) | Carlton | 5.8 (38) | EMCG | 31 May 1902 |

=== Round 6 ===
| Home team | Home team score | Away team | Away team score | Venue | Date |
|---|---|---|---|---|---|
| Collingwood | 6.15 (51) | Essendon | 11.10 (76) | Victoria Park | 7 June 1902 |
| Carlton | 4.6 (30) | Fitzroy | 9.14 (68) | Princes Park | 7 June 1902 |
| South Melbourne | 5.13 (43) | St Kilda | 1.3 (9) | Lake Oval | 7 June 1902 |
| Melbourne | 2.13 (25) | Geelong | 3.8 (26) | MCG | 7 June 1902 |

=== Round 7 ===
| Home team | Home team score | Away team | Away team score | Venue | Date |
|---|---|---|---|---|---|
| Melbourne | 7.5 (47) | South Melbourne | 6.10 (46) | MCG | 9 June 1902 |
| Fitzroy | 8.14 (62) | Geelong | 3.8 (26) | Brunswick Street Oval | 9 June 1902 |
| St Kilda | 6.4 (40) | Essendon | 10.4 (64) | Junction Oval | 9 June 1902 |
| Collingwood | 8.11 (59) | Carlton | 3.3 (21) | Victoria Park | 9 June 1902 |

=== Round 8 ===
| Home team | Home team score | Away team | Away team score | Venue | Date |
|---|---|---|---|---|---|
| Collingwood | 4.26 (50) | South Melbourne | 1.8 (14) | Victoria Park | 14 June 1902 |
| St Kilda | 3.6 (24) | Melbourne | 8.7 (55) | Junction Oval | 14 June 1902 |
| Fitzroy | 5.12 (42) | Essendon | 7.6 (48) | Brunswick Street Oval | 14 June 1902 |
| Geelong | 6.7 (43) | Carlton | 7.5 (47) | Corio Oval | 14 June 1902 |

=== Round 9 ===
| Home team | Home team score | Away team | Away team score | Venue | Date |
|---|---|---|---|---|---|
| Fitzroy | 12.8 (80) | St Kilda | 2.7 (19) | Brunswick Street Oval | 21 June 1902 |
| Essendon | 2.3 (15) | Geelong | 4.10 (34) | EMCG | 21 June 1902 |
| Collingwood | 7.19 (61) | Melbourne | 4.7 (31) | Victoria Park | 21 June 1902 |
| Carlton | 4.7 (31) | South Melbourne | 2.6 (18) | Princes Park | 21 June 1902 |

=== Round 10 ===
| Home team | Home team score | Away team | Away team score | Venue | Date |
|---|---|---|---|---|---|
| Carlton | 10.12 (72) | St Kilda | 7.7 (49) | Princes Park | 5 July 1902 |
| South Melbourne | 6.10 (46) | Fitzroy | 4.10 (34) | Lake Oval | 5 July 1902 |
| Melbourne | 3.9 (27) | Essendon | 6.12 (48) | MCG | 5 July 1902 |
| Geelong | 6.8 (44) | Collingwood | 12.12 (84) | Corio Oval | 5 July 1902 |

=== Round 11 ===
| Home team | Home team score | Away team | Away team score | Venue | Date |
|---|---|---|---|---|---|
| St Kilda | 4.9 (33) | Geelong | 7.7 (49) | Junction Oval | 12 July 1902 |
| South Melbourne | 5.6 (36) | Essendon | 6.7 (43) | Lake Oval | 12 July 1902 |
| Fitzroy | 6.9 (45) | Collingwood | 9.14 (68) | Brunswick Street Oval | 12 July 1902 |
| Melbourne | 4.12 (36) | Carlton | 4.9 (33) | MCG | 12 July 1902 |

=== Round 12 ===
| Home team | Home team score | Away team | Away team score | Venue | Date |
|---|---|---|---|---|---|
| Collingwood | 19.13 (127) | St Kilda | 1.4 (10) | Victoria Park | 19 July 1902 |
| Carlton | 4.9 (33) | Essendon | 1.10 (16) | Princes Park | 19 July 1902 |
| South Melbourne | 7.13 (55) | Geelong | 6.9 (45) | Lake Oval | 19 July 1902 |
| Melbourne | 5.7 (37) | Fitzroy | 4.9 (33) | MCG | 19 July 1902 |

=== Round 13 ===
| Home team | Home team score | Away team | Away team score | Venue | Date |
|---|---|---|---|---|---|
| St Kilda | 2.10 (22) | South Melbourne | 5.7 (37) | Junction Oval | 26 July 1902 |
| Geelong | 8.6 (54) | Melbourne | 3.9 (27) | Corio Oval | 26 July 1902 |
| Essendon | 5.6 (36) | Collingwood | 7.5 (47) | EMCG | 26 July 1902 |
| Fitzroy | 4.6 (30) | Carlton | 6.8 (44) | Brunswick Street Oval | 26 July 1902 |

=== Round 14 ===
| Home team | Home team score | Away team | Away team score | Venue | Date |
|---|---|---|---|---|---|
| Essendon | 12.12 (84) | St Kilda | 3.4 (22) | EMCG | 2 August 1902 |
| Carlton | 2.3 (15) | Collingwood | 7.10 (52) | Princes Park | 2 August 1902 |
| South Melbourne | 3.9 (27) | Melbourne | 9.9 (63) | Lake Oval | 2 August 1902 |
| Geelong | 5.10 (40) | Fitzroy | 9.7 (61) | Corio Oval | 2 August 1902 |

=== Pre-sectional ladder ===
| Section A |
| Section B |

| # | Team | P | W | L | D | PF | PA | % | Pts |
|---|---|---|---|---|---|---|---|---|---|
| 1 | Collingwood | 14 | 12 | 2 | 0 | 838 | 461 | 181.8 | 48 |
| 2 | Essendon | 14 | 10 | 4 | 0 | 690 | 506 | 136.4 | 40 |
| 3 | Fitzroy | 14 | 9 | 5 | 0 | 783 | 553 | 141.6 | 36 |
| 4 | Melbourne | 14 | 7 | 7 | 0 | 618 | 610 | 101.3 | 28 |
| 5 | Geelong | 14 | 7 | 7 | 0 | 604 | 667 | 90.6 | 28 |
| 6 | Carlton | 14 | 6 | 8 | 0 | 494 | 653 | 75.7 | 24 |
| 7 | South Melbourne | 14 | 5 | 9 | 0 | 522 | 535 | 97.6 | 20 |
| 8 | St Kilda | 14 | 0 | 14 | 0 | 408 | 972 | 42.0 | 0 |

Rules for classification: 1. premiership points; 2. percentage; 3. points for
Source: AFL Tables

=== Round 15 (Sectional round 1) ===
| Home team | Home team score | Away team | Away team score | Venue | Date |
|---|---|---|---|---|---|
| Melbourne | 7.5 (47) | Carlton | 1.7 (13) | MCG | 16 August 1902 |
| Collingwood | 12.12 (84) | South Melbourne | 5.14 (44) | Victoria Park | 16 August 1902 |
| St Kilda | 3.5 (23) | Essendon | 10.12 (72) | Junction Oval | 16 August 1902 |
| Geelong | 5.6 (36) | Fitzroy | 6.15 (51) | Corio Oval | 16 August 1902 |

=== Round 16 (Sectional round 2) ===
| Home team | Home team score | Away team | Away team score | Venue | Date |
|---|---|---|---|---|---|
| Carlton | 6.11 (47) | St Kilda | 3.6 (24) | Princes Park | 23 August 1902 |
| Fitzroy | 5.4 (34) | Collingwood | 13.9 (87) | Brunswick Street Oval | 23 August 1902 |
| Essendon | 11.11 (77) | Melbourne | 8.8 (56) | MCG | 23 August 1902 |
| South Melbourne | 12.12 (84) | Geelong | 5.9 (39) | Lake Oval | 23 August 1902 |

=== Round 17 (Sectional round 3) ===
| Home team | Home team score | Away team | Away team score | Venue | Date |
|---|---|---|---|---|---|
| Carlton | 5.10 (40) | Essendon | 7.4 (46) | Princes Park | 30 August 1902 |
| Collingwood | 16.16 (112) | Geelong | 2.11 (23) | Victoria Park | 30 August 1902 |
| Fitzroy | 6.10 (46) | South Melbourne | 7.8 (50) | Brunswick Street Oval | 30 August 1902 |
| Melbourne | 10.9 (69) | St Kilda | 5.5 (35) | MCG | 30 August 1902 |

== Ladder ==
| (P) | Premiers |
| | Qualified for finals |

| # | Team | P | W | L | D | PF | PA | % | Pts |
|---|---|---|---|---|---|---|---|---|---|
| 1 | Collingwood (P) | 17 | 15 | 2 | 0 | 1121 | 562 | 199.5 | 60 |
| 2 | Essendon | 17 | 13 | 4 | 0 | 885 | 625 | 141.6 | 52 |
| 3 | Fitzroy | 17 | 10 | 7 | 0 | 914 | 726 | 125.9 | 40 |
| 4 | Melbourne | 17 | 9 | 8 | 0 | 800 | 735 | 108.8 | 36 |
| 5 | South Melbourne | 17 | 7 | 10 | 0 | 700 | 704 | 99.4 | 28 |
| 6 | Carlton | 17 | 7 | 10 | 0 | 594 | 770 | 77.1 | 28 |
| 7 | Geelong | 17 | 7 | 10 | 0 | 702 | 914 | 76.8 | 28 |
| 8 | St Kilda | 17 | 0 | 17 | 0 | 490 | 1170 | 41.9 | 0 |

Rules for classification: 1. premiership points; 2. percentage; 3. points for
Average score: 45.6
Source: AFL Tables

== Finals series ==
=== Semi-finals ===
| Home team | Home team score | Away team | Away team score | Venue | Date | Attendance |
|---|---|---|---|---|---|---|
| Essendon | 9.7 (61) | Melbourne | 7.9 (51) | Princes Park | 6 September 1902 | 8,000 |
| Collingwood | 6.12 (48) | Fitzroy | 9.10 (64) | MCG | 6 September 1902 | 13,000 |

=== Preliminary final ===
| Home team | Home team score | Away team | Away team score | Venue | Date | Attendance |
|---|---|---|---|---|---|---|
| Fitzroy | 4.10 (34) | Essendon | 6.9 (45) | MCG | 13 September 1902 | 26,000 |

=== Grand final ===
| | Grand final |
| Saturday, 20 September (2:50 pm) | Collingwood 9.6 (60) | def. | Essendon 3.9 (27) | Melbourne Cricket Ground (crowd: 35,202) |

== Win–loss table ==
The following table can be sorted from biggest winning margin to biggest losing margin for each round. If two or more matches in a round are decided by the same margin, these margins are sorted by percentage (i.e. the lowest-scoring winning team is ranked highest and the lowest-scoring losing team is ranked lowest). Opponents are listed above the margins and home matches are in bold.

By having the best overall record for the season following the second week of finals, Collingwood won the right to challenge the preliminary final winner for the premiership.

| + | Win | Qualified for finals |
| − | Loss | Eliminated |
| X | Bye | |

| Team | Home-and-away season | | | | | | | | | | | | | | | | | Ladder | Finals series | | |
| Team | 1 | 2 | 3 | 4 | 5 | 6 | 7 | 8 | 9 | 10 | 11 | 12 | 13 | 14 | 15 | 16 | 17 | Ladder | SF | PF | GF |
|---|---|---|---|---|---|---|---|---|---|---|---|---|---|---|---|---|---|---|---|---|---|
| Carlton | **GEE** **−38** | SM −53 | STK +8 | **MEL** **−11** | ESS −20 | **FIT** **−38** | COL −38 | GEE +4 | **SM** **+13** | **STK** **+23** | MEL −3 | **ESS** **+17** | FIT +14 | **COL** **−37** | MEL −34 | **STK** **+23** | **ESS** **−6** | 6 (7–10–0) | | | |
| Collingwood | SM +18 | MEL +17 | **GEE** **+61** | **FIT** **−33** | STK +7 | **ESS** **−25** | **CAR** **+38** | **SM** **+36** | **MEL** **+30** | GEE +40 | FIT +23 | **STK** **+117** | ESS +11 | CAR +37 | **SM** **+40** | FIT +53 | **GEE** **+89** | 1 (15–2–0) | **FIT** **−16** | X | **ESS** **+33** |
| Essendon | **FIT** **−13** | GEE +53 | **MEL** **+23** | **SM** **+3** | **CAR** **+20** | COL +25 | STK +24 | FIT +6 | **GEE** **−19** | MEL +21 | SM +7 | CAR −17 | **COL** **−11** | **STK** **+62** | STK +49 | **MEL** **+21** | CAR +6 | 2 (13–4–0) | **MEL** **+10** | **FIT** **+11** | COL −33 |
| Fitzroy | ESS +13 | STK +68 | **SM** **+6** | COL +33 | **MEL** **+13** | CAR +38 | **GEE** **+36** | **ESS** **−6** | **STK** **+61** | SM −12 | **COL** **−23** | MEL −4 | **CAR** **−14** | GEE +21 | GEE +15 | **COL** **−53** | **SM** **−4** | 3 (10–7–0) | COL +16 | ESS −11 | |
| Geelong | CAR +38 | **ESS** **−53** | COL −61 | **STK** **+44** | **SM** **+17** | MEL +1 | FIT −36 | **CAR** **−4** | ESS +19 | **COL** **−40** | STK +16 | SM −10 | **MEL** **+27** | **FIT** **−21** | **FIT** **−15** | SM −45 | COL −89 | 7 (7–10–0) | | | |
| Melbourne | **STK** **+54** | **COL** **−17** | ESS −23 | CAR +11 | FIT −13 | **GEE** **−1** | **SM** **+1** | STK +31 | COL −30 | **ESS** **−21** | **CAR** **+3** | **FIT** **+4** | GEE −27 | SM +36 | **CAR** **+34** | ESS −21 | **STK** **+44** | 4 (9–8–0) | ESS −10 | | |
| South Melbourne | **COL** **−18** | **CAR** **+53** | FIT −6 | ESS −3 | GEE −17 | **STK** **+34** | MEL −1 | COL −36 | CAR −13 | **FIT** **+12** | **ESS** **−7** | **GEE** **+10** | STK +15 | **MEL** **−36** | COL −40 | **GEE** **+45** | FIT +4 | 5 (7–10–0) | | | |
| St Kilda | MEL −54 | **FIT** **−68** | **CAR** **−8** | GEE −44 | **COL** **−7** | SM −34 | **ESS** **−24** | **MEL** **−31** | FIT −61 | CAR −23 | **GEE** **−16** | COL −117 | **SM** **−15** | ESS −62 | **ESS** **−49** | CAR −23 | MEL −44 | 8 (0–17–0) | | | |

Source: AFL Tables

== Season notes ==
- The VFL instituted the amended Argus system to determine the season's premiers.
- St Kilda finished last without a win, their sixth consecutive wooden spoon, and seven games behind second-last Geelong, both VFL/AFL records.
- In each of Rounds 8 and 10, while Essendon champion Albert Thurgood was serving a three-match suspension for striking, one of his team-mates took the field each week under the nom de guerre "Goodthur"; the name was used (in quote marks) in all news reports of the matches. Football historians Michael Maplestone and Stephen Rogers, through a process of elimination, determined that Goodthur was most likely Fred Mann, and official statistics reflect this.
- Collingwood's Charlie Pannam becomes the first VFL player to play 100 VFL games (at the end of the 1902 season, he had played in 104 of the 106 VFL games that Collingwood had played since the VFL's first round of games in 1897).

== Awards ==
- The 1902 VFL Premiership team was Collingwood.
- The VFL's leading goalkicker in the home-and-away season was Charlie Baker of St Kilda with 30 goals; St Kilda kicked only 64 goals for the year, of which Baker kicked 46.9%, and Baker's proportion of his team's goals is a VFL/AFL record. Including finals, Ted Rowell of Collingwood scored the most goals with 33.

== Sources ==
- 1902 VFL season at AFL Tables
- 1902 VFL season at Australian Football
