= Jack James (Australian footballer) =

Australian rules footballer

Personal information
- Born: 31 October 1892
- Died: 27 April 1977 (aged 84)
- Original team: South Yarra
- Height: 165 cm (5 ft 5 in)
- Weight: 61 kg (134 lb)
- Positions: Rover, forward pocket

Playing career^{1}
Years	Club	Games (Goals)
1915, 1918–1925	St Kilda	123 (114)
1926	Richmond	16 (19)
Total		139 (133)
- ^{1} Playing statistics correct to the end of 1926.

Career highlights
- St Kilda leading goalkicker – 1919, 1920, 1924

Jack James (31 October 1892 – 27 April 1977) was an Australian rules footballer who played for the St Kilda and Richmond Football Clubs in the Victorian Football League (VFL).

James played for the Saints in 1915 and from 1918 to 1925. He was St Kilda's leading goalkicker in 1919, 1920 and 1924.

His total of 13 goals in 1920 would make him the last player to lead a VFL/AFL club for goalkicking with 15 goals or fewer until 2020, exactly 100 years later, with Taylor Walker kicking just 15 goals in the coronavirus-affected 2020 season.

James later played 16 games for Richmond in 1926.
