= 2014 St Kilda Football Club season =

St Kilda Football Club
2014 season
- Coach: Alan Richardson
- Captain: Nick Riewoldt
- Home ground: Etihad Stadium (Capacity: 56,347)
- AFL season: 18th
- Finals series: DNQ
- Best and Fairest: Nick Riewoldt
- Leading goalkicker: Nick Riewoldt (49)

The 2014 St Kilda Football Club season was the 118th in the club's history. Coached by Alan Richardson and captained by Nick Riewoldt, they competed in the AFL's 2014 Toyota Premiership Season.

== Season summary ==
=== Pre-season ===
**Rd**	**Date and local time**	**Opponent**	**Scores** (St Kilda's scores indicated in **bold**)			**Venue**	**Attendance**
**Rd**	**Date and local time**	**Opponent**	Home	Away	Result	**Venue**	**Attendance**
1	Wednesday, 19 February, 7:10pm	Western Bulldogs	0.10.7 (67)	**1.7.5 (56)**	Lost by 11 points	Simonds Stadium (A)	2,894
2	Saturday, 1 March, 4:40pm	Greater Western Sydney	7.11.10 (139)	**0.10.11 (71)**	Lost by 68 points	Robertson Oval, Wagga Wagga (A)	7,944
Practice	Saturday, 8 March, 12:30pm	Port Adelaide	18.7 (115)	**16.10 (106)**	Lost by 9 points	Alberton Oval (A)	6,000

=== Regular season ===
**Rd**	**Date and local time**	**Opponent**	**Scores** (St Kilda's scores indicated in **bold**)			**Venue**	**Attendance**	**Ladder**
**Rd**	**Date and local time**	**Opponent**	Home	Away	Result	**Venue**	**Attendance**	**Ladder**
1	Saturday, 22 March (7:40 pm)	Melbourne	**10.8 (68)**	6.15 (51)	Won by 17 points	Etihad Stadium (H)	31,657	8th
2	Saturday, 29 March (1:40 pm)	Greater Western Sydney	**15.5 (95)**	13.10 (88)	Won by 7 points	Etihad Stadium (H)	19,640	6th
3	Saturday, 5 April (4:40 pm)	West Coast	12.11 (83)	**8.10 (58)**	Lost by 25 points	Patersons Stadium (A)	36,448	9th
4	Sunday, 13 April (3:20 pm)	Adelaide	**7.8 (50)**	20.16 (136)	Lost by 86 points	Etihad Stadium (H)	22,923	12th
5	Saturday, 19 April (7:40 pm)	Essendon	9.11 (65)	**11.15 (81)**	Lost by 16 points	Etihad Stadium (A)	36,041	9th
6	Friday, 25 April (7:45 pm)	Brisbane Lions	**11.13 (79)**	12.10 (82)	Lost by 3 points	Westpac Stadium (H)	13,409	11th
7	Saturday, 3 May (1:45 pm)	Hawthorn	27.13 (175)	**4.6 (30)**	Lost by 145 points	MCG (A)	32,924	12th
8	Monday, 12 May (7:20 pm)	Carlton	**9.15 (69)**	15.11 (101)	Lost by 32 points	Etihad Stadium (H)	26,708	14th
9	Sunday, 18 May (4:40 pm)	Gold Coast	**13.9 (87)**	19.11 (125)	Lost by 38 points	Etihad Stadium (H)	14,625	15th
10	Bye							16th
11	Friday, 30 May (7:50 pm)	Collingwood	**8.6 (54)**	21.14 (140)	Lost by 86 points	Etihad Stadium (H)	34,855	16th
12	Saturday, 7 June (4:10 pm)	Port Adelaide	19.15 (129)	**9.5 (59)**	Lost by 70 points	Adelaide Oval (A)	42,374	17th
13	Sunday, 15 June (1:10 pm)	Geelong	20.13 (133)	**5.7 (37)**	Lost by 96 points	Simonds Stadium (A)	25,180	18th
14	Sunday, 22 June (3:20 pm)	West Coast	**10.10 (70)**	15.13 (103)	Lost by 33 points	Etihad Stadium (H)	17,317	18th
15	Saturday, 28 June (2:10 pm)	Richmond	**11.7 (73)**	18.9 (117)	Lost by 44 points	Etihad Stadium (H)	28,487	18th
16	Sunday, 6 July (1:10 pm)	Carlton	24.7 (151)	**10.6 (66)**	Lost by 85 points	Etihad Stadium (A)	29,297	18th
17	Saturday, 12 July (2:10 pm)	North Melbourne	13.14 (92)	**3.15 (33)**	Lost by 59 points	Blundstone Arena (A)	10,641	18th
18	Saturday, 19 July (4:40 pm)	Fremantle	**17.16 (118)**	9.6 (60)	Won by 58 points	Etihad Stadium (H)	16,594	18th
19	Saturday, 2 August (7:40 pm)	Gold Coast	17.15 (117)	**9.10 (64)**	Lost by 53 points	Metricon Stadium (A)	12,027	18th
20	Sunday, 10 August (3:20 pm)	Western Bulldogs	**15.9 (99)**	18.14 (122)	Lost by 23 points	Etihad Stadium (H)	30,095	18th
21	Saturday, 16 August (1:45 pm)	Sydney	19.13 (127)	**8.8 (56)**	Lost by 71 points	SCG (A)	31,361	18th
22	Sunday, 24 August (4:40 pm)	Richmond	15.8 (98)	**10.12 (72)**	Lost by 26 points	MCG (A)	47,200	18th
23	Sunday, 31 August (2:50 pm)	Adelaide	22.9 (141)	**9.8 (62)**	Lost by 79 points	Adelaide Oval (A)	44,969	18th

== Standings ==
2014 AFL ladder
Pos	Team	Pld	W	L	D	PF	PA	PP	Pts	
1	Sydney	22	17	5	0	2126	1488	142.9	68	Finals series
2	Hawthorn (P)	22	17	5	0	2458	1746	140.8	68	Finals series
3	Geelong	22	17	5	0	2033	1787	113.8	68	Finals series
4	Fremantle	22	16	6	0	2029	1556	130.4	64	Finals series
5	Port Adelaide	22	14	8	0	2180	1678	129.9	56	Finals series
6	North Melbourne	22	14	8	0	2026	1731	117.0	56	Finals series
7	Essendon	22	12	9	1	1828	1719	106.3	50	Finals series
8	Richmond	22	12	10	0	1887	1784	105.8	48	Finals series
9	West Coast	22	11	11	0	2045	1750	116.9	44	
10	Adelaide	22	11	11	0	2175	1907	114.1	44	
11	Collingwood	22	11	11	0	1766	1876	94.1	44	
12	Gold Coast	22	10	12	0	1917	2045	93.7	40	
13	Carlton	22	7	14	1	1891	2107	89.7	30	
14	Western Bulldogs	22	7	15	0	1784	2177	81.9	28	
15	Brisbane Lions	22	7	15	0	1532	2212	69.3	28	
16	Greater Western Sydney	22	6	16	0	1780	2320	76.7	24	
17	Melbourne	22	4	18	0	1336	1954	68.4	16	
18	St Kilda	22	4	18	0	1480	2436	60.8	16	

Source: AFL Tables
Rules for classification: 1) points; 2) percentage; 3) number of points for.
(P) Premiers
