= George Young (Australian rules footballer) =

Australian rules footballer and cricketer (born 1949)

Personal information
- Full name: George Albert Young
- Born: 3 February 1949 (age 77); Caulfield, Victoria
- Original team: Wembley Amateurs
- Height: 185 cm (6 ft 1 in)
- Weight: 86 kg (190 lb)

Playing career^{1}
Years	Club	Games (Goals)
1969–1972	Subiaco	77 (72)
1973–1978	St Kilda	108 (284)
- ^{1} Playing statistics correct to the end of 1978.

Career highlights
- All-Australian team: 1972; St Kilda leading goalkicker: 1975, 1976, 1977 & 1978

George Albert Young (born 3 February 1949) is a former Australian rules footballer who played with St Kilda in the Victorian Football League (VFL) and Subiaco in the West Australian National Football League (WANFL) during the 1970s.

Before Young came to St Kilda, he played 76 WANFL games with Subiaco as well as representing Western Australia (where his family relocated from Melbourne when he was one year old) at interstate football; his performance at the 1972 Perth Carnival had earned him an All-Australian selection. He debuted for St Kilda in 1973 and played his first couple of seasons as a half forward flanker. In 1975, he played at full-forward and topped the club's goalkicking every season before leaving after the 1978 season. His best tally was 70 goals in 1978, a year in which he managed a bag of 10 against Fitzroy in their Round 12 encounter.

Young also played two Sheffield Shield matches for the Western Australian cricket team in the 1972–73 Australian cricket season. He was a left-handed batsman and made a century in the second match, an innings of 125 against South Australia at the WACA Ground.

== See also ==
- List of Western Australia first-class cricketers
