= 2016 St Kilda Football Club season =

St Kilda Football Club
2016 season
- Coach: Alan Richardson
- Captain: Nick Riewoldt
- Home ground: Marvel Stadium (Capacity: 56,347)
- Home and away season: 9th
- Finals series: DNQ

The 2016 St Kilda Football Club season was the 120th in the club's history. Coached by Alan Richardson and captained by Nick Riewoldt, they competed in the AFL's 2016 Toyota Premiership Season.

== Season summary ==
=== Pre-season ===
**Rd**	**Date and local time**	**Opponent**	**Scores** (St Kilda's scores indicated in **bold**)			**Venue**	**Attendance**
**Rd**	**Date and local time**	**Opponent**	Home	Away	Result	**Venue**	**Attendance**
1	Saturday 20 February, 2:05pm	North Melbourne	**1.9.10 (73)**	0.18.9 (117)	Lost by 47 points	Norm Minns Oval, Wangaratta (H)	6,216
2	Sunday 6 March	Brisbane Lions	Game Cancelled			Harrup Park Country Club, Mackay (A)
3	Sunday 13 March, 4:10pm	Melbourne	1.14.14 (107)	**0.12.11 (83)**	Lost by 24 points	Etihad Stadium (A)	8,621

=== Regular season ===
**Rd**	**Date and local time**	**Opponent**	**Scores** (St Kilda's scores indicated in **bold**)			**Venue**	**Attendance**	**Ladder**
**Rd**	**Date and local time**	**Opponent**	Home	Away	Result	**Venue**	**Attendance**	**Ladder**
1	Sunday, 27 March (2:50 pm)	Port Adelaide	20.13 (133)	**15.10 (100)**	Lost by 33 points	Adelaide Oval (A)	42,896	13th
2	Saturday, 2 April (7:25 pm)	Western Bulldogs	**5.6 (36)**	13.15 (93)	Lost by 57 points	Etihad Stadium (A)	37,7353	18th
3	Saturday, 9 April (1:45 pm)	Collingwood	**18.11 (119)**	14.6 (90)	Won by 29 points	MCG (H)	50,903	13th
4	Saturday, 16 April (2:10 pm)	Hawthorn	13.9 (87)	**13.6 (84)**	Lost by 3 points	Aurora Stadium (A)	36,650	12th
5	Sunday, 24 April (1:10 pm)	Greater Western Sydney	**12.7 (79)**	19.12 (126)	Lost by 47 points	Etihad Stadium (H)	21,052	13th
6	Saturday, 30 April (1:45 pm)	Melbourne	15.9 (96)	**20.15 (135)**	Won by 39 points	Etihad Stadium (A)	27,260	12th
7	Sunday, 8 May (3:20 pm)	North Melbourne	**11.9 (75)**	11.16 (82)	Lost by 7 points	Etihad Stadium (H)	27,254	13th
8	Sunday, 15 May (2:40 pm)	West Coast	20.12 (132)	**3.11 (29)**	Lost by 103 points	Domain Stadium (A)	36,140	14th
9	Sunday, 22 May (4:40 pm)	Essendon	**16.13 (109)**	9.9 (63)	Won by 46 points	Etihad Stadium (H)	29,026	13th
10	Saturday, 28 May (4:35 pm)	Fremantle	**15.11 (101)**	10.7 (67)	Won by 34 points	Etihad Stadium (H)	17,927	13th
11	Sunday, 5 June (4:10 pm)	Adelaide	19.19 (133)	**6.9 (45)**	Lost by 72 points	Adelaide Oval (A)	40,896	13th
12	Sunday, 12 June (1:10 pm)	Carlton	**17.8 (110)**	12.6 (78)	Won by 32 points	Etihad Stadium (H)	47,945	12th
13	Bye							12th
14	Saturday, 25 June (7:25 pm)	Geelong	**14.9 (93)**	13.12 (90)	Won by 3 points	Etihad Stadium (H)	28,745	12th
15	Saturday, 2 July (1:40 pm)	Gold Coast	15.18 (108)	**8.20 (68)**	Lost by 40 points	Metricon Stadium (A)	14,071	13th
16	Sunday, 10 July (4:40 pm)	Essendon	14.14 (98)	**17.7 (109)**	Won by 11 points	Etihad Stadium (A)	25,204	12th
17	Sunday, 17 July (3:20 pm)	Melbourne	**15.20 (110)**	11.8 (74)	Won by 36 points	Etihad Stadium (H)	26,389	10th
18	Saturday, 23 July (7:25 pm)	Western Bulldogs	9.6 (60)	**11.9 (75)**	Won by 15 points	Etihad Stadium (A)	26,532	9th
19	Saturday, 30 July (7:25 pm)	North Melbourne	12.13 (85)	**8.14 (62)**	Lost by 23 points	Etihad Stadium (A)	44,287	10th
20	Sunday, 7 August (1:10 pm)	Carlton	7.9 (51)	**19.8 (122)**	Won by 71 points	MCG (A)	37,797	9th
21	Saturday, 13 August (7:25 pm)	Sydney	**11.10 (76)**	23.8 (146)	Lost by 70 points	Etihad Stadium (H)	33,059	10th
22	Saturday, 20 August (2:10 pm)	Richmond	6.10 (46)	**7.13 (55)**	Won by 9 points	MCG (A)	35,255	9th
23	Sunday, 28 August (1:10 pm)	Brisbane Lions	**25.11 (161)**	15.13 (103)	Won by 58 points	Etihad Stadium (H)	21,834	9th

== Standings ==
Pos	Team	Pld	W	L	D	PF	PA	PP	Pts	Qualification
1	Sydney	22	17	5	0	2221	1469	151.2	68	2016 finals
2	Geelong	22	17	5	0	2235	1554	143.8	68	2016 finals
3	Hawthorn	22	17	5	0	2134	1800	118.6	68	2016 finals
4	Greater Western Sydney	22	16	6	0	2380	1663	143.1	64	2016 finals
5	Adelaide	22	16	6	0	2483	1795	138.3	64	2016 finals
6	West Coast	22	16	6	0	2181	1678	130.0	64	2016 finals
7	Western Bulldogs (P)	22	15	7	0	1857	1609	115.4	60	2016 finals
8	North Melbourne	22	12	10	0	1956	1859	105.2	48	2016 finals
9	St Kilda	22	12	10	0	1953	2041	95.7	48	
10	Port Adelaide	22	10	12	0	2055	1939	106.0	40	
11	Melbourne	22	10	12	0	1944	1991	97.6	40	
12	Collingwood	22	9	13	0	1910	1998	95.6	36	
13	Richmond	22	8	14	0	1713	2155	79.5	32	
14	Carlton	22	7	15	0	1568	1978	79.3	28	
15	Gold Coast	22	6	16	0	1778	2273	78.2	24	
16	Fremantle	22	4	18	0	1574	2119	74.3	16	
17	Brisbane Lions	22	3	19	0	1770	2872	61.6	12	
18	Essendon	22	3	19	0	1437	2356	61.0	12	

Source: AFL
Rules for classification: 1) points; 2) percentage; 3) number of points for.
(P) Premiers
