= Mark Scott (footballer) =

Australian rules footballer

Personal information
- Born: 24 March 1959 (age 67)
- Original team: Burwood United
- Height: 196 cm (6 ft 5 in)
- Weight: 80 kg (176 lb)

Playing career^{1}
Years	Club	Games (Goals)
1978–1980	Hawthorn	3 (8)
1980–1983	St Kilda	34 (110)
1983–1989	Fitzroy	41 (57)
Total		78 (175)
- ^{1} Playing statistics correct to the end of 1989.

Mark Scott (born 24 March 1959) is a former Australian rules footballer who played for Hawthorn, St Kilda and Fitzroy in the VFL during the 1980s.

Although Scott, a full-forward, had a career in the VFL which spanned over a decade, he is best known for his performances in the reserves. In 168 reserves games, he kicked 655 goals, and was a three-time reserves leading goalkicker: with Hawthorn in 1977 and 1978, and with Fitzroy in 1988.

He topped the Saints' goalkicking twice in the seniors, with 48 goals in 1980 and 45 goals in 1982. He had started the 1980 season with Hawthorn, but during the season he was traded to St Kilda for Russell Greene.
