= Jim Stewart (footballer, born 1884) =

Australian rules footballer

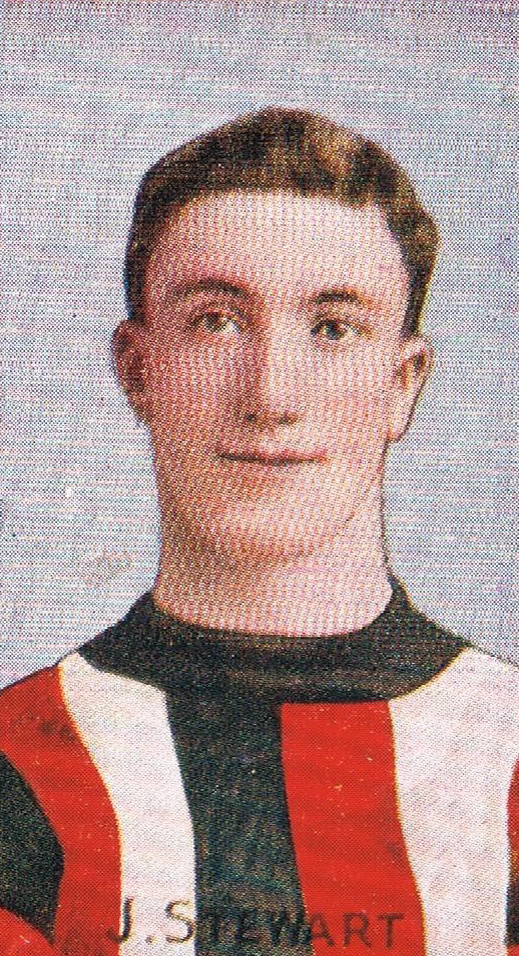
- Cigarette card of Stewart in 1908

Personal information
- Full name: James Findlay Stewart
- Born: 16 April 1884; Eaglehawk, Victoria
- Died: 4 February 1951 (aged 66); Brisbane, Queensland
- Original team: North Melbourne
- Height: 170 cm (5 ft 7 in)
- Weight: 69 kg (152 lb)
- Positions: Half-forward flank, centre

Playing career^{1}
Years	Club	Games (Goals)
1905–1910	St Kilda	83 (77)
1912	Carlton	2 (2)
Total		85 (79)
- ^{1} Playing statistics correct to the end of 1912.

James Findlay Stewart (16 April 1884 – 4 February 1951) was an Australian rules footballer who played with St Kilda and Carlton in the Victorian Football League (VFL).

Stewart was a wingman in North Melbourne's 1903 Victorian Football Association premiership team and was also a member of the side which were awarded the premiership the following year. Although Carlton tried recruiting him, Stewart opted to join St Kilda in 1905. He was used as a centreman originally but ended up spending most of his time on a half forward flank and topped St Kilda's goal-kicking in both 1907 and 1908, with 21 and 28 goals respectively. His best effort in 1907 was a seven-goal haul in a win over Geelong at Corio Oval, breaking the club record, which had stood at four goals. He returned to North Melbourne in 1911 and then spent a season with Carlton.
