= 2007 St Kilda Football Club season =

St Kilda Football Club
2007 season
- President: Rod Butterss
- Coach: Ross Lyon
- Captains: Nick Riewoldt; Lenny Hayes; Luke Ball
- Home ground: Telstra Dome (Capacity: 56,347)
- NAB Cup: First Round (Lost 1.5.6 (45) to 0.7.10 (52) vs Brisbane Lions, Match #5)
- Home and away season: 9th
- Finals series: DNQ
- Trevor Barker Award: Nick Riewoldt
- Leading goalkicker: Fraser Gehrig (59)
- Highest home attendance: 47,605 (21 April vs Essendon, Round 4)
- Lowest home attendance: 24,041 (18 August vs Fremantle, Round 20)

The 2007 St Kilda Football Club season was the 111th in the club's history. Coached by Ross Lyon and co-captained by Nick Riewoldt, Lenny Hayes and Luke Ball, they competed in the AFL's 2007 Toyota Premiership Season.

The club finished ninth on the premiership ladder; winning 11 games, losing 10 and drawing one. It was the first time since 2003 the team failed to qualify for the finals series.

== Pre-season ==
St Kilda's campaign in the 2007 NAB Cup ended in the first round, going down to Brisbane Lions at Cazalys Stadium, Cairns.

Rd	Date and local time	Opponent	Scores (St Kilda's scores indicated in bold)		Result	Venue	Attendance
			Home	Away			
NAB Cup Rd 1	Saturday, 24 February	Brisbane Lions	**1.5.6 (45)**	0.7.10 (52)	Lost by 7 points	Cazalys Stadium (A)	—

== Premiership season ==
=== League table ===
2007 AFL ladder
Pos	Team	Pld	W	L	D	PF	PA	PP	Pts	
1	Geelong (P)	22	18	4	0	2542	1664	152.8	72	Finals series
2	Port Adelaide	22	15	7	0	2314	2038	113.5	60	Finals series
3	West Coast	22	15	7	0	2162	1935	111.7	60	Finals series
4	Kangaroos	22	14	8	0	2183	1998	109.3	56	Finals series
5	Hawthorn	22	13	9	0	2097	1855	113.0	52	Finals series
6	Collingwood	22	13	9	0	2011	1992	101.0	52	Finals series
7	Sydney	22	12	9	1	2031	1698	119.6	50	Finals series
8	Adelaide	22	12	10	0	1881	1712	109.9	48	Finals series
**9**	St Kilda	**22**	**11**	**10**	**1**	**1874**	**1941**	**96.5**	46	
10	Brisbane Lions	22	9	11	2	1986	1885	105.4	40	
11	Fremantle	22	10	12	0	2254	2198	102.5	40	
12	Essendon	22	10	12	0	2184	2394	91.2	40	
13	Western Bulldogs	22	9	12	1	2111	2469	85.5	38	
14	Melbourne	22	5	17	0	1890	2418	78.2	20	
15	Carlton	22	4	18	0	2167	2911	74.4	16	
16	Richmond	22	3	18	1	1958	2537	77.2	14	

Source: AFL ladder
Rules for classification: 1) points; 2) percentage; 3) number of points for.
(P) Premiers

=== Matches ===
St Kilda finished the 2007 AFL season with a record of 11 wins, 10 losses and 1 draw (46 competition points, 96.5%), placing 9th on the ladder and missing the finals series by two points, the first time since 2003 the club had failed to qualify.

Win
Loss
Draw

Rd	Date and local time	Opponent	Home	Away	Result	Venue	Attendance	Ladder
1	Friday, 30 March (7:40 pm)	Melbourne	4.3 9.8 (62)	**2.7 13.15 (93)**	Won by 31 pts	M.C.G. (A)	49,490	2nd
2	Thursday, 5 April (7:40 pm)	Brisbane Lions	2.4 15.12 (102)	**2.3 7.8 (50)**	Lost by 52 pts	Gabba (A)	28,266	11th
3	Saturday, 14 April (7:15 pm)	Western Bulldogs	**6.3 17.14 (116)**	2.2 9.12 (66)	Won by 50 pts	Docklands (H)	38,474	6th
4	Saturday, 21 April (2:10 pm)	Essendon	**2.4 9.14 (68)**	1.2 15.9 (99)	Lost by 31 pts	Docklands (H)	47,605	10th
5	Friday, 27 April (7:45 pm)	Port Adelaide	4.2 14.12 (96)	**1.2 6.7 (43)**	Lost by 53 pts	Football Park (A)	24,438	13th
6	Friday, 4 May (7:40 pm)	Carlton	**4.3 18.17 (125)**	2.5 11.16 (82)	Won by 43 pts	Docklands (H)	45,513	11th
7	Saturday, 12 May (7:15 pm)	Sydney Swans	**4.4 15.7 (97)**	4.1 11.5 (71)	Won by 26 pts	Docklands (H)	37,816	9th
8	Saturday, 19 May (7:15 pm)	Hawthorn	2.3 10.12 (72)	**1.2 6.8 (44)**	Lost by 28 pts	M.C.G. (A)	36,069	12th
9	Friday, 25 May (8:40 pm)	Fremantle	6.6 15.11 (101)	**1.4 6.19 (55)**	Lost by 46 pts	Subiaco (A)	39,034	13th
10	Sunday, 3 June (5:10 pm)	Geelong	**4.1 9.11 (65)**	7.2 19.11 (125)	Lost by 60 pts	Docklands (H)	42,188	13th
11	Sunday, 10 June (2:10 pm)	Kangaroos	**1.3 8.10 (58)**	4.2 11.14 (80)	Lost by 22 pts	Docklands (H)	34,569	14th
12	Sunday, 24 June (4:40 pm)	West Coast Eagles	3.4 11.10 (76)	**3.3 15.9 (99)**	Won by 23 pts	Subiaco (A)	39,401	12th
13	Saturday, 30 June (7:15 pm)	Richmond	**5.1 17.15 (117)**	5.1 15.10 (100)	Won by 17 pts	Docklands (H)	38,689	12th
14	Saturday, 7 July (2:10 pm)	Collingwood	4.5 12.17 (89)	**3.3 12.8 (80)**	Lost by 9 pts	M.C.G. (A)	57,247	12th
15	Friday, 13 July (7:40 pm)	Adelaide	**2.3 11.16 (82)**	5.2 12.8 (80)	Won by 2 pts	Docklands (H)	32,210	11th
16	Saturday, 21 July (7:15 pm)	Hawthorn	**3.2 14.11 (95)**	2.3 11.12 (78)	Won by 17 pts	Docklands (H)	37,847	11th
17	Saturday, 28 July (2:10 pm)	Carlton	6.1 15.11 (101)	**5.4 16.15 (111)**	Won by 10 pts	Docklands (A)	32,327	9th
18	Friday, 3 August (7:40 pm)	Western Bulldogs	4.5 12.13 (85)	**3.3 12.13 (85)**	Drew	Docklands (A)	33,600	9th
19	Saturday, 11 August (7:40 pm)	Sydney Swans	2.2 12.10 (82)	**3.4 9.11 (65)**	Lost by 17 pts	Stadium Australia (A)	63,369	9th
20	Saturday, 18 August (2:10 pm)	Fremantle	**4.3 19.12 (126)**	4.4 14.12 (96)	Won by 30 pts	Docklands (H)	24,041	8th
21	Friday, 24 August (7:40 pm)	West Coast Eagles	**5.5 14.14 (98)**	1.1 16.10 (106)	Lost by 8 pts	Docklands (H)	38,183	9th
22	Saturday, 1 September (2:10 pm)	Richmond	2.2 13.14 (92)	**4.8 14.18 (102)**	Won by 10 pts	M.C.G. (A)	42,472	9th
