= 2013 St Kilda Football Club season =

St Kilda Football Club
2013 season
- Coach: Scott Watters
- Captain: Nick Riewoldt
- Home ground: Etihad Stadium (Capacity: 56,347)
- AFL season: 16th
- Finals series: DNQ
- Best and Fairest: Jack Steven
- Leading goalkicker: Nick Riewoldt (50)

The 2013 St Kilda Football Club season was the 117th in the club's history. Coached by Scott Watters and captained by Nick Riewoldt, they competed in the AFL's 2013 Toyota Premiership Season.

== Season summary ==
=== Pre-season ===
| **Rd** | **Date and local time** | **Opponent** | **Scores** (St Kilda's scores indicated in **bold**) | | | **Venue** | **Attendance** |
| **Rd** | **Date and local time** | **Opponent** | Home | Away | Result | **Venue** | **Attendance** |
| 1 / 1 | Sunday, 17 February, 4:10pm | Adelaide | 0.3.6 (24) | **0.8.2 (50)** | Won by 26 points | AAMI Stadium (A) | 8,966 |
| 1 / 2 | Sunday, 17 February, 5:15pm | Port Adelaide | 1.9.2 (65) | **0.2.3 (15)** | Lost by 50 points | AAMI Stadium (A) | 8,966 |
| 2 | Sunday, 3 March, 5:10pm | Sydney | **0.13.12 (90)** | 1.8.10 (67) | Won by 23 points | Etihad Stadium (H) | 6,656 |
| 3 | Saturday, 9 March, 2:30pm | Melbourne | 2.7.6 (66) | **2.10.13 (91)** | Won by 25 points | Casey Fields, Cranbourne (A) | 5,000 |
| Practice | Saturday, 16 March, 2:00pm | Greater Western Sydney | 16.6 (102) | **12.14 (86)** | Lost by 16 points | Blacktown International Sportspark (A) |

=== Regular season ===
| **Rd** | **Date and local time** | **Opponent** | **Scores** (St Kilda's scores indicated in **bold**) | | | **Venue** | **Attendance** | **Ladder** |
| **Rd** | **Date and local time** | **Opponent** | Home | Away | Result | **Venue** | **Attendance** | **Ladder** |
| 1 | Saturday, 30 March (6:45 pm) | Gold Coast | 13.12 (90) | **10.17 (77)** | Lost by 13 points | Metricon Stadium (A) | 13,832 | 12th |
| 2 | Friday, 5 April (7:50 pm) | Richmond | **12.10 (82)** | 14.15 (99) | Lost by 17 points | MCG (H) | 56,783 | 14th |
| 3 | Saturday, 13 April (4:40 pm) | Greater Western Sydney | 10.8 (68) | **21.14 (140)** | Won by 72 points | StarTrack Oval Canberra (A) | 11,092 | 9th |
| 4 | Saturday, 20 April (4:40 pm) | Essendon | **13.13 (91)** | 19.14 (128) | Lost by 37 points | Etihad Stadium (H) | 46,965 | 10th |
| 5 | Thursday, 25 April (7:50 pm) | Sydney | **9.9 (63)** | 11.13 (79) | Lost by 16 points | Westpac Stadium (H) | 22,546 | 14th |
| 6 | Friday, 3 May (7:50 pm) | Collingwood | 15.13 (103) | **11.11 (77)** | Lost by 26 points | Etihad Stadium (A) | 40,071 | 15th |
| 7 | Monday, 13 May (7:40 pm) | Carlton | **11.11 (77)** | 9.14 (68) | Won by 9 points | Etihad Stadium (H) | 34,054 | 14th |
| 8 | Sunday, 19 May (4:10 pm) | Adelaide | 12.15 (87) | **6.11 (47)** | Lost by 40 points | AAMI Stadium (A) | 34,605 | 15th |
| 9 | Saturday, 25 May (4:40 pm) | Western Bulldogs | **15.11 (101)** | 17.8 (110) | Lost by 9 points | Etihad Stadium (H) | 25,982 | 15th |
| 10 | Sunday, 2 June (4:40 pm) | North Melbourne | 19.19 (133) | **10.5 (65)** | Lost by 68 points | Etihad Stadium (A) | 25,658 | 16th |
| 11 | Sunday, 9 June (4:40 pm) | West Coast | **11.14 (80)** | 12.12 (84) | Lost by 4 points | Etihad Stadium (H) | 23,795 | 16th |
| 12 | Bye | | | | | | | 16th |
| 13 | Saturday, 22 June (4:40 pm) | Melbourne | **16.8 (104)** | 10.9 (69) | Won by 35 points | MCG (H) | 28,751 | 15th |
| 14 | Sunday, 30 June (4:40 pm) | Richmond | 17.17 (119) | **8.7 (55)** | Lost by 64 points | MCG (A) | 52,184 | 15th |
| 15 | Sunday, 7 July (1:20 pm) | Fremantle | 15.10 (100) | **11.4 (70)** | Lost by 30 points | Patersons Stadium (A) | 34,064 | 16th |
| 16 | Saturday, 13 July (7:40 pm) | Carlton | 16.14 (110) | **10.14 (74)** | Lost by 36 points | Etihad Stadium (H) | 30,949 | 16th |
| 17 | Saturday, 20 July (7:40 pm) | Port Adelaide | **13.14 (92)** | 14.13 (97) | Lost by 5 points | Etihad Stadium (H) | 14,878 | 16th |
| 18 | Saturday, 27 July (7:40 pm) | Geelong | 21.11 (137) | **5.6 (36)** | Lost by 101 points | Simonds Stadium (A) | 27,200 | 16th |
| 19 | Saturday, 3 August (7:40 pm) | Brisbane Lions | 16.12 (108) | **11.11 (77)** | Lost by 31 points | Gabba (A) | 19,856 | 16th |
| 20 | Friday, 9 August (7:50 pm) | Hawthorn | **7.14 (56)** | 14.18 (102) | Lost by 46 points | Etihad Stadium (H) | 24,765 | 16th |
| 21 | Sunday, 18 August (3:20 pm) | Sydney | 18.10 (118) | **8.11 (59)** | Lost by 59 points | SCG (A) | 26,730 | 16th |
| 22 | Sunday, 25 August (1:10 pm) | Gold Coast | **17.14 (116)** | 10.10 (70) | Lost by 46 points | Etihad Stadium (H) | 17,622 | 16th |
| 23 | Saturday, 31 August (1:45 pm) | Fremantle | **16.16 (112)** | 6.5 (41) | Won by 71 points | Etihad Stadium (H) | 22,476 | 16th |

== Standings ==
2013 AFL ladder
| Pos | Team | Pld | W | L | D | PF | PA | PP | Pts | |
|---|---|---|---|---|---|---|---|---|---|---|
| 1 | Hawthorn (P) | 22 | 19 | 3 | 0 | 2523 | 1859 | 135.7 | 76 | Finals series |
| 2 | Geelong | 22 | 18 | 4 | 0 | 2409 | 1776 | 135.6 | 72 | Finals series |
| 3 | Fremantle | 22 | 16 | 5 | 1 | 2035 | 1518 | 134.1 | 66 | Finals series |
| 4 | Sydney | 22 | 15 | 6 | 1 | 2244 | 1694 | 132.5 | 62 | Finals series |
| 5 | Richmond | 22 | 15 | 7 | 0 | 2154 | 1754 | 122.8 | 60 | Finals series |
| 6 | Collingwood | 22 | 14 | 8 | 0 | 2148 | 1868 | 115.0 | 56 | Finals series |
| 7 | Port Adelaide | 22 | 12 | 10 | 0 | 2051 | 2002 | 102.4 | 48 | Finals series |
| 8 | Carlton | 22 | 11 | 11 | 0 | 2125 | 1992 | 106.7 | 44 | Finals series |
| 9 | Essendon | 22 | 14 | 8 | 0 | 2145 | 2000 | 107.3 | 56 (Note: Essendon was relegated to ninth due to irregularities in its supplements program during the 2012 season.) | |
| 10 | North Melbourne | 22 | 10 | 12 | 0 | 2307 | 1930 | 119.5 | 40 | |
| 11 | Adelaide | 22 | 10 | 12 | 0 | 2064 | 1909 | 108.1 | 40 | |
| 12 | Brisbane Lions | 22 | 10 | 12 | 0 | 1922 | 2144 | 89.6 | 40 | |
| 13 | West Coast | 22 | 9 | 13 | 0 | 2038 | 2139 | 95.3 | 36 | |
| 14 | Gold Coast | 22 | 8 | 14 | 0 | 1918 | 2091 | 91.7 | 32 | |
| 15 | Western Bulldogs | 22 | 8 | 14 | 0 | 1926 | 2262 | 85.1 | 32 | |
| 16 | St Kilda | 22 | 5 | 17 | 0 | 1751 | 2120 | 82.6 | 20 | |
| 17 | Melbourne | 22 | 2 | 20 | 0 | 1455 | 2691 | 54.1 | 8 | |
| 18 | Greater Western Sydney | 22 | 1 | 21 | 0 | 1524 | 2990 | 51.0 | 4 | |

Source: AFL Tables
Rules for classification: 1) points; 2) percentage; 3) number of points for.
(P) Premiers
