= Harry Moyes =

Australian rules footballer

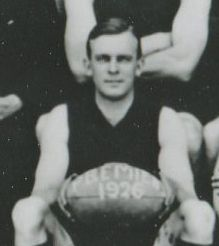

Personal information
- Full name: Harold Milne Moyes
- Born: 28 July 1896; Prahran, Victoria
- Died: 18 September 1968 (aged 72); Fairfield, Victoria
- Original team: South Yarra
- Height: 170 cm (5 ft 7 in)
- Weight: 66 kg (146 lb)

Playing career^{1}
Years	Club	Games (Goals)
1915, 1919–24	St Kilda	61 (128)
1925–27	Melbourne	45 (106)
Total		106 (234)
- ^{1} Playing statistics correct to the end of 1927.

Career highlights
- AIF Pioneer Exhibition Game, London, 28 October 1916; St Kilda leading goalkicker: 1915, 1921, 1922 & 1923; Melbourne premiership player: 1926

Harold Milne Moyes (28 July 1896 – 18 September 1968) was an Australian rules footballer who played for St Kilda and Melbourne in the Victorian Football League (VFL).

== Football ==
A left footed forward, Moyes started his league career in 1915 with St Kilda Football Club and topped St Kilda's goalkicking with 32 goals.

Due to the war he didn't return to the club until 1919 and every season from 1921 to 1923 he topped St Kilda's goalkicking.

In 1925 he crossed to Melbourne and with 55 goals in 1926 was a vital member of their premiership team that season. He kicked three goals in Melbourne's grand final win over Collingwood and his end of season tally was the third highest in the league.

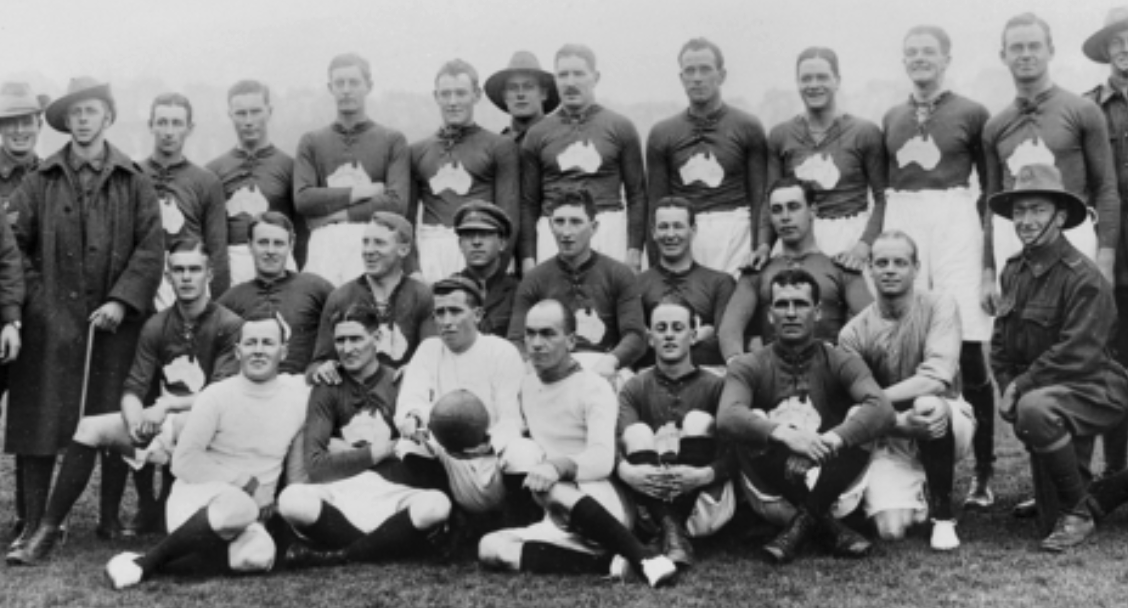
The Third Australian Divisional Team: 28 October 1916. Harry Moyes is at the extreme left of the middle row.

== Military service ==
He played for the (winning) Third Australian Divisional team in the famous "Pioneer Exhibition Game" of Australian Rules football, held in London, in October 1916. A news film was taken at the match.

== See also ==
- 1916 Pioneer Exhibition Game
