= Bill Young (footballer, born 1931) =

Australian rules footballer (1931–2020)

Personal information
- Full name: William Desmond Young
- Born: 6 June 1931
- Died: 4 March 2020 (aged 88); Sale, Victoria
- Original team: Stratford
- Debut: Round 3, 1956, St Kilda vs. Carlton, at Junction Oval
- Height: 179 cm (5 ft 10 in)
- Weight: 73 kg (161 lb)

Playing career^{1}
Years	Club	Games (Goals)
1956–1961	St Kilda	94 (274)
- ^{1} Playing statistics correct to the end of 1961.

Career highlights
- VFL Leading Goal-kicker 1956 (56 goals); Victorian B team representative 1959

William Desmond Young (6 June 1931 – 4 March 2020) was an Australian rules footballer who played with the St Kilda Football Club in the Victorian Football League (VFL).

Young was an all-round sportsman, a goal scorer in country football and a cricketer who once top-scored for a Victorian country team against England. He was also a track cyclist, represented Country Victoria at tennis and later in life was an A-grade squash player.

In 1948, 1950, 1952, 1954 and 1955, Young was leading goalkicker in the Gippsland Football League, kicking 160 goals in 1954 and 136 in 1955. His best efforts were 26 goals in a game in 1950 and 22 in 1954.

Young debuted aged 25 with the St Kilda Football Club at full-forward in 1956, kicking 56 goals in his debut year and winning the VFL's leading goalkicker award.

Being the first individually contracted player for £700 from Stratford he was St Kilda's leading goal-kicker from 1956 to 1960, including three years in a row (1956–1958) where he tallied 56 goals for the year.

Blair Campbell credited him with inventing the reverse punt shot at goal, now generally known as a banana kick. However, it is now believed the history of the banana kick goes back to South Melbourne Football Club's Allen Burns, who was described as kicking a banana kick in an article from the 1890s. Nevertheless, Young's use—whether learned or rediscovered independently—helped inspire Campbell and brought the kick into the mainstream.

Young was rather frail for a VFL full-forward—moreover, he was under 6 feet—but he used his leaping ability to mark overhead.

In 1962, he captain-coached Back Rock in the Federal Football League and won the league goalkicking with 76 goals. He accepted a role at St Kilda as an assistant coach to Allan Jeans in 1963 that ended his playing career.
