= 1966 St Kilda Football Club season =

St Kilda Football Club
1966 season
- President: Graham Huggins
- Coach: Allan Jeans
- Captain: Darrel Baldock
- Home ground: Moorabbin Oval
- VFL season: 2nd
- Finals series: Premiers
- Best and Fairest: Ian Stewart
- Leading goalkicker: Kevin Neale (55 goals)
- Highest home attendance: 50,458, vs. Essendon, 13 June
- Lowest home attendance: 15,003, vs. Melbourne, 16 July
- Average home attendance: 26,626 (total 239,628)

The 1966 St Kilda Football Club season is the most successful season in St Kilda Football Club history. It currently stands as the only premiership season for St Kilda since its entry into the VFL. (Note: Now known as the AFL.) The Saints season in 1966 also saw St Kilda win every home game, including the Grand Final rematch in round 8.

Although 1966 was St Kilda's first premiership season, the club had been to the VFL Grand Final in 1913 and more recently, 1965. Leading up to the premiership season, St Kilda had played finals football in both the 1961 and 1963 seasons.

That they won the 1966 flag was perhaps more surprising given the success of the season prior, in which the Saints finished minor premiers before winning the Second Semi Final in a thrilling one-point victory over Collingwood, and losing to Essendon in the Grand Final.

== Season summary ==
=== Fixture ===
St Kilda's 1966 VFL season fixture
Round	Date	Opponent	Home	Away	Result	Venue	Attendance	Ladder position
Round	Date	Opponent	Scores			Venue	Attendance	Ladder position
1	Monday, 25 April	Melbourne	4.9 (33)	17.7 (109)	Won (76 points)	Melbourne Cricket Ground	64,930	1st
2	Saturday, 30 April	Carlton	15.17 (107)	7.12 (54)	Won (53 points)	Moorabbin Oval	30,810	1st
3	Saturday, 7 May	North Melbourne	9.13 (67)	15.13 (103)	Won (36 points)	Arden Street Oval	17,261	1st
4	Saturday, 14 May	Geelong	15.11 (101)	7.16 (58)	Won (43 points)	Moorabbin Oval	37,140	1st
5	Saturday, 21 May	South Melbourne	7.11 (53)	13.17 (95)	Won (42 points)	Lake Oval	32,294	1st
6	Saturday, 28 May	Fitzroy	17.16 (118)	8.6 (54)	Won (64 points)	Moorabbin Oval	19,737	1st
7	Saturday, 4 June	Hawthorn	11.12 (78)	15.12 (102)	Won (24 points)	Glenferrie Oval	17,755	1st
8	Monday, 13 June	Essendon	8.8 (56)	7.7 (49)	Won (7 points)	Moorabbin Oval	50,458	1st
9	Saturday, 18 June	Richmond	16.13 (109)	11.8 (74)	Lost (35 points)	Melbourne Cricket Ground	55,426	1st
10	Saturday, 25 June	Collingwood	17.15 (117)	6.9 (45)	Lost (72 points)	Victoria Park	37,607	2nd
11	Saturday, 2 July	Footscray	15.15 (105)	7.12 (54)	Won (51 points)	Moorabbin Oval	21,507	2nd
12	Saturday, 16 July	Melbourne	12.13 (85)	6.6 (42)	Won (43 points)	Moorabbin Oval	15,003	2nd
13	Saturday, 23 July	Carlton	7.15 (57)	5.11 (41)	Lost (16 points)	Princes Park	23,367	3rd
14	Saturday, 30 July	North Melbourne	10.18 (78)	4.16 (40)	Won (38 points)	Moorabbin Oval	20,530	3rd
15	Saturday, 6 August	Geelong	14.11 (95)	10.12 (72)	Lost (23 points)	Kardinia Park	28,720	3rd
16	Saturday, 13 August	South Melbourne	19.19 (133)	10.6 (66)	Won (67 points)	Moorabbin Oval	20,583	2nd
17	Saturday, 20 August	Fitzroy	5.10 (40)	17.22 (124)	Won (84 points)	Brunswick Street Oval	12,343	2nd
18	Saturday, 27 August	Hawthorn	14.9 (93)	13.5 (83)	Won (10 points)	Moorabbin Oval	23,860	2nd
Finals
SF (2nd)	Saturday, 10 September	Collingwood	15.9 (99)	13.11 (89)	Lost (10 points)	Melbourne Cricket Ground	95,614	—N/a
PF	Saturday, 17 September	Essendon	15.4 (94)	7.10 (52)	Won (42 points)	Melbourne Cricket Ground	93,453	—N/a
GF	Saturday, 24 September	Collingwood	10.13 (73)	10.14 (74)	Won (1 point)	Melbourne Cricket Ground	102,055	—N/a

=== Ladder ===
1966 VFL ladder
Pos.	Team	P	W	L	D	PF	PA	%	Pts	GF–BF	GA–BA	F/A	A/A	W%
1	Collingwood	18	15	3	0	1687	1073	157.22	60	236–271	149–179	93.72	59.61	83.33
2	St Kilda	18	14	4	0	1641	1149	142.82	56	234–237	159–195	91.17	63.83	77.78
3	Geelong	18	14	4	0	1599	1162	137.61	56	226–243	164–178	88.83	64.56	77.78
4	Essendon	18	14	4	0	1457	1204	121.01	56	207–215	173–166	80.94	66.89	77.78
5	Richmond	18	13	4	1	1626	1320	123.18	54	232–234	183–222	90.33	73.33	72.22
6	Carlton	18	10	8	0	1233	1143	107.87	40	169–219	160–183	68.50	63.50	55.56
7	North Melbourne	18	7	10	1	1294	1381	93.70	30	178–226	191–235	71.89	76.72	38.89
8	South Melbourne	18	7	11	0	1486	1505	98.74	28	212–214	205–275	82.56	83.61	38.89
9	Hawthorn	18	5	13	0	1224	1650	74.18	20	171–198	235–240	68.00	91.67	27.78
10	Footscray	18	4	14	0	1004	1458	68.86	16	136–188	201–252	55.78	81.00	22.22
11	Melbourne	18	3	15	0	1235	1580	78.17	12	169–221	226–224	68.61	87.78	16.67
12	Fitzroy	18	1	17	0	1004	1865	53.83	4	141–158	265–275	55.78	103.61	5.56
