= Jack Connelly =

Australian rules footballer

Personal information
- Full name: Jack H. Connelly
- Born: 4 August 1918
- Died: 10 August 2006 (aged 88)
- Original team: Preston
- Height: 179 cm (5 ft 10 in)
- Weight: 80 kg (176 lb)

Playing career^{1}
Years	Club	Games (Goals)
1942–1944	St Kilda	28 (40)
- ^{1} Playing statistics correct to the end of 1944.

Jack H. Connelly (4 August 1918 – 10 August 2006) was an Australian rules footballer who played with St Kilda in the Victorian Football League (VFL).

Connelly, a forward, was St Kilda's leading goal-kicker in the 1943 VFL season, with 27 goals, despite not playing past round 11. He returned to his original club, Preston, in 1945.
