= 2012 St Kilda Football Club season =

St Kilda Football Club
2012 season
- Coach: Scott Watters
- Captain: Nick Riewoldt
- Home ground: Etihad Stadium (Capacity: 56,347)
- AFL season: 9th
- Finals series: DNQ
- Best and Fairest: Lenny Hayes
- Leading goalkicker: Stephen Milne (56)

The 2012 St Kilda Football Club season was the 116th in the club's history. Coached by Scott Watters and captained by Nick Riewoldt, they competed in the AFL's 2012 Toyota Premiership Season.

== Season summary ==
=== Pre-season ===
**Rd**	**Date and local time**	**Opponent**	**Scores** (St Kilda's scores indicated in **bold**)			**Venue**	**Attendance**
**Rd**	**Date and local time**	**Opponent**	Home	Away	Result	**Venue**	**Attendance**
1 / 1	Friday, 24 February, 6:40pm	Sydney	**0.4.5 (29)**	0.9.5 (59)	Lost by 30 points	Etihad Stadium (H)	18,880
1 / 2	Friday, 24 February, 8:50pm	Geelong	**1.3.9 (36)**	1.0.6 (15)	Won by 21 points	Etihad Stadium (H)	18,880
2	Saturday, 3 March	Essendon	Game cancelled		Won by forfeit	Wangaratta Showgrounds (A)
3	Saturday, 10 March, 5:10pm	West Coast	1.10.16 (85)	**0.7.10 (52)**	Lost by 33 points	Patersons Stadium (A)	9,411
Practice	Friday, 16 March, 4:00pm	Collingwood	10.20 (80)	**6.11 (47)**	Lost by 33 points	Visy Park (A)	3,000

=== Regular season ===
**Rd**	**Date and local time**	**Opponent**	**Scores** (St Kilda's scores indicated in **bold**)			**Venue**	**Attendance**	**Ladder**
**Rd**	**Date and local time**	**Opponent**	Home	Away	Result	**Venue**	**Attendance**	**Ladder**
1	Sunday, 1 April, 4:10pm	Port Adelaide	13.11 (89)	**13.7 (85)**	Lost by 4 points	AAMI Stadium (A)	21,179	12th
2	Sunday, 8 April, 4:40pm	Gold Coast	**21.13 (139)**	7.5 (47)	Won by 92 points	Etihad Stadium (H)	21,032	7th
3	Saturday, 14 April, 7:40pm	Western Bulldogs	5.10 (40)	**15.13 (103)**	Won by 63 points	Etihad Stadium (A)	28,971	5th
4	Friday, 20 April, 7:50pm	Fremantle	**11.13 (79)**	14.8 (92)	Lost by 13 points	Etihad Stadium (H)	30,172	7th
5	Saturday, 28 April, 7:40pm	Melbourne	10.6 (66)	**12.12 (84)**	Won by 18 points	MCG (A)	24,798	6th
6	Saturday, 5 May, 7:40pm	Hawthorn	**13.10 (88)**	18.15 (123)	Lost by 35 points	MCG (H)	42,289	9th
7	Monday, 14 May, 7:40pm	Carlton	**19.8 (122)**	14.14 (98)	Won by 24 points	Etihad Stadium (H)	38,823	8th
8	Sunday, 20 May, 2:40pm	West Coast	18.13 (121)	**13.13 (91)**	Lost by 30 points	Patersons Stadium (A)	38,174	9th
9	Saturday, 26 May, 4:40pm	Sydney	**16.15 (111)**	12.11 (83)	Won by 28 points	Etihad Stadium (H)	34,737	7th
10	Friday, 1 June, 7:50pm	Richmond	**16.17 (113)**	18.13 (121)	Lost by 8 points	Etihad Stadium (H)	49,337	9th
11	Saturday, 9 June, 4:40pm	Gold Coast	7.7 (49)	**21.18 (144)**	Won by 95 points	Metricon Stadium (A)	12,534	8th
12	Friday, 15 June, 8:10pm	Adelaide	17.13 (115)	**16.15 (111)**	Lost by 4 points	AAMI Stadium (A)	36,394	8th
13	Bye							8th
14	Sunday, 1 July, 4:40pm	North Melbourne	**15.13 (103)**	21.10 (136)	Lost by 33 points	Etihad Stadium (H)	33,106	9th
15	Saturday, 7 July, 7:40pm	Essendon	**21.7 (133)**	8.14 (62)	Won by 71 points	Etihad Stadium (H)	45,838	8th
16	Saturday, 14 July, 7:40pm	Brisbane Lions	14.8 (92)	**16.9 (105)**	Won by 13 points	The Gabba (A)	19,228	8th
17	Sunday, 22 July, 1:10pm	Sydney	15.15 (105)	**10.16 (76)**	Lost by 29 points	SCG (A)	26,834	10th
18	Sunday, 29 July, 3:15pm	Western Bulldogs	**16.22 (118)**	6.6 (42)	Won by 76 points	Etihad Stadium (H)	23,498	10th
19	Saturday, 4 August, 7:40pm	Collingwood	12.19 (91)	**13.7 (85)**	Lost by 6 points	MCG (A)	57,873	10th
20	Saturday, 11 August, 1:45pm	Melbourne	**16.11 (107)**	12.10 (82)	Won by 25 points	MCG (H)	23,464	10th
21	Friday, 17 August, 7:50pm	Geelong	18.15 (123)	**11.15 (81)**	Lost by 42 points	Etihad Stadium (A)	38,169	11th
22	Saturday, 25 August, 1:45pm	Greater Western Sydney	**25.13 (163)**	5.5 (35)	Won by 128 points	Etihad Stadium (H)	17,327	9th
23	Sunday, 2 September, 1:10pm	Carlton	12.19 (91)	**16.10 (106)**	Won by 15 points	Etihad Stadium (A)	31,393	9th

== Ladder ==
2012 AFL ladder
Pos	Team	Pld	W	L	D	PF	PA	PP	Pts	
1	Hawthorn	22	17	5	0	2679	1733	154.6	68	Finals series
2	Adelaide	22	17	5	0	2428	1833	132.5	68	Finals series
3	Sydney (P)	22	16	6	0	2290	1629	140.6	64	Finals series
4	Collingwood	22	16	6	0	2123	1823	116.5	64	Finals series
5	West Coast	22	15	7	0	2244	1807	124.2	60	Finals series
6	Geelong	22	15	7	0	2209	1886	117.1	60	Finals series
7	Fremantle	22	14	8	0	1956	1691	115.7	56	Finals series
8	North Melbourne	22	14	8	0	2359	2097	112.5	56	Finals series
9	St Kilda	22	12	10	0	2347	1903	123.3	48	
10	Carlton	22	11	11	0	2079	1925	108.0	44	
11	Essendon	22	11	11	0	2091	2090	100.0	44	
12	Richmond	22	10	11	1	2169	1943	111.6	42	
13	Brisbane Lions	22	10	12	0	1904	2092	91.0	40	
14	Port Adelaide	22	5	16	1	1691	2144	78.9	22	
15	Western Bulldogs	22	5	17	0	1542	2301	67.0	20	
16	Melbourne	22	4	18	0	1580	2341	67.5	16	
17	Gold Coast	22	3	19	0	1509	2481	60.8	12	
18	Greater Western Sydney	22	2	20	0	1270	2751	46.2	8	

Rules for classification: 1) points; 2) percentage; 3) number of points for.
(P) Premiers
