= 2005 St Kilda Football Club season =

St Kilda Football Club
2005 season
- President: Rod Butterss
- Coach: Grant Thomas
- Captain: Nick Riewoldt
- Home ground: Telstra Dome (Capacity: 56,347); Aurora Stadium (Capacity: 19,500)
- Wizard Cup: Quarter-finalists (Lost 1.9.11 (74) to 2.10.7 (85) vs Western Bulldogs, 1st Quarter Final)
- Home and away season: 4th
- Finals series: Preliminary Finalists (Lost 9.11 (65) to 15.6 (96) vs Sydney Swans, 1st Preliminary Final)
- Trevor Barker Award: Steven Baker; Luke Ball
- Leading goalkicker: Fraser Gehrig (78)
- Highest home attendance: 73,344 (16 September vs Sydney Swans, 1st Preliminary Final)
- Lowest home attendance: 12,465 (3 April vs Fremantle, Round 2)

The 2005 St Kilda Football Club season was the 109th in the club's history. Coached by Grant Thomas and captained by Nick Riewoldt, they competed in the AFL's 2005 Toyota Premiership Season.

== Standings ==
2005 AFL ladder
Pos	Team	Pld	W	L	D	PF	PA	PP	Pts	
1	Adelaide	22	17	5	0	2070	1517	136.5	68	Finals series
2	West Coast	22	17	5	0	2261	1824	124.0	68	Finals series
3	Sydney (P)	22	15	7	0	1974	1696	116.4	60	Finals series
4	St Kilda	22	14	8	0	2407	1806	133.3	56	Finals series
5	Kangaroos	22	13	9	0	2053	2069	99.2	52	Finals series
6	Geelong	22	12	10	0	2134	1906	112.0	48	Finals series
7	Melbourne	22	12	10	0	2171	2266	95.8	48	Finals series
8	Port Adelaide	22	11	10	1	2028	2066	98.2	46	Finals series
9	Western Bulldogs	22	11	11	0	2385	2351	101.4	44	
10	Fremantle	22	11	11	0	2041	2038	100.1	44	
11	Brisbane Lions	22	10	12	0	2139	2164	98.8	40	
12	Richmond	22	10	12	0	2022	2190	92.3	40	
13	Essendon	22	8	14	0	2118	2302	92.0	32	
14	Hawthorn	22	5	17	0	1904	2317	82.2	20	
15	Collingwood	22	5	17	0	1884	2425	77.7	20	
16	Carlton	22	4	17	1	2016	2670	75.5	18	

Source: AFL ladder
Rules for classification: 1) points; 2) percentage; 3) number of points for.
(P) Premiers
