= 2011 St Kilda Football Club season =

St Kilda Football Club
2011 season
- Coach: Ross Lyon
- Captain: Nick Riewoldt
- Home ground: Docklands Stadium
- NAB cup: Quarter final
- AFL season: 6th
- Finals series: Elimination Final
- Best and Fairest: Sam Fisher
- Leading goalkicker: Stephen Milne (56)

The 2011 St Kilda Football Club season was the club's 114th since their introduction to the VFL/AFL in 1897.

== Season summary ==
=== 2011 Preseason ===
**Rd**	**Date and local time**	**Opponent**	**Scores** (St Kilda's scores indicated in **bold**)			**Venue**	**Attendance**
**Rd**	**Date and local time**	**Opponent**	Home	Away	Result	**Venue**	**Attendance**
1 / 1	Friday, 18 February (8:20pm)	Brisbane Lions	0.2.3 (15)	**1.5.5 (44)**	Won by 29 points	Etihad Stadium (A)	24,158
1 / 2	Friday, 18 February (9:25pm)	Essendon	0.5.8 (38)	**0.6.2 (38)**	Draw	Etihad Stadium (A)	24,158
2	Saturday, 26 February (7:10pm)	Geelong	1.6.6 (51)	**1.15.7 (106)**	Won by 55 points	Etihad Stadium (A)	24,158
3	Friday, 4 March (7:40pm)	Essendon	0.12.12 (84)	**0.6.9 (45)**	Lost by 39 points	Etihad Stadium (A)	17,632
Practice	Saturday, 12 March, 7:00pm	Sydney	12.12 (84)	**8.5 (53)**	Lost by 31 points	BCU International Stadium, Coffs Harbour (A)	4,827

=== Regular season ===
**Rd**	**Date and local time**	**Opponent**	**Scores** (St Kilda's scores indicated in **bold**)			**Venue**	**Attendance**	**Ladder**
**Rd**	**Date and local time**	**Opponent**	Home	Away	Result	**Venue**	**Attendance**	**Ladder**
1	Friday, 25 March (7:40 pm)	Geelong	6.12 (48)	**6.11 (47)**	Lost by 1 points	MCG (A)	42,869	10th
2	Friday, 1 April (7:40 pm)	Richmond	**13.17 (95)**	14.11 (95)	Draw	MCG (H)	41,465	11th
3	Sunday, 10 April (4:40 pm)	Essendon	**12.12 (84)**	21.10 (136)	Lost by 52 points	Etihad Stadium (H)	47,762	12th
4	Bye							13th
5	Thursday, 21 April (7:40 pm)	Brisbane Lions	11.10 (76)	**13.11 (89)**	Won by 13 points	The Gabba (A)	22,520	11th
6	Saturday, 30 April (7:10 pm)	Adelaide	13.12 (90)	**9.17 (71)**	Lost by 19 points	AAMI Stadium (A)	33,854	13th
7	Monday, 9 May (7:20 pm)	Carlton	**12.9 (81)**	11.18 (84)	Lost by 3 points	Etihad Stadium (H)	38,823	14th
8	Sunday, 15 May (1:10 pm)	Hawthorn	14.15 (99)	**10.9 (69)**	Lost by 30 points	MCG (A)	42,453	15th
9	Saturday, 21 May (2:10 pm)	Melbourne	**16.10 (106)**	13.8 (86)	Won by 20 points	Etihad Stadium (H)	28.863	13th
10	Saturday, 28 May (1:10 pm)	Fremantle	7.14 (56)	**15.12 (102)**	Won by 46 points	Patersons Stadium (A)	35,483	11th
11	Saturday, 4 June (7:10 pm)	Collingwood	16.12 (108)	**7.9 (51)**	Lost by 57 points	MCG (A)	62,991	11th
12	Friday, 10 June (7:40 pm)	Western Bulldogs	**12.9 (81)**	8.9 (57)	Won by 24 points	Etihad Stadium (H)	31,237	9th
13	Saturday, 18 June (7:10 pm)	Geelong	**11.6 (72)**	15.10 (100)	Lost by 28 points	MCG (H)	39,539	12th
14	Bye							13th
15	Sunday, 3 July (4:40 pm)	North Melbourne	10.10 (70)	**12.7 (79)**	Won by 9 points	Etihad Stadium (A)	29,693	12th
16	Sunday, 10 July (2:40 pm)	Port Adelaide	8.5 (53)	**17.7 (109)**	Won by 56 points	AAMI Stadium (A)	16,887	11th
17	Saturday, 16 July (7:10 pm)	West Coast	**13.4 (82)**	9.7 (61)	Won by 21 points	Etihad Stadium (H)	31,416	10th
18	Friday, 22 July (7:40 pm)	Adelaide	**19.13 (127)**	3.6 (24)	Won by 103 points	Etihad Stadium (H)	26,546	8th
19	Saturday, 30 July (7:10 pm)	Gold Coast	6.18 (54)	**10.14 (74)**	Won by 20 points	Metricon Stadium (A)	17,482	7th
20	Friday, 5 August (7:40 pm)	Fremantle	**16.17 (113)**	10.12 (72)	Won by 41 points	Etihad Stadium (H)	26,181	6th
21	Friday, 12 August (7:40 pm)	Collingwood	**10.10 (70)**	14.5 (89)	Lost by 19 points	Etihad Stadium (H)	46,505	6th
22	Sunday, 21 August (1:10 pm)	Sydney	10.23 (83)	**10.8 (68)**	Lost by 15 points	ANZ Stadium (A)	25,025	6th
23	Saturday, 27 August (7:10 pm)	North Melbourne	**19.21 (135)**	10.10 (70)	Won by 65 points	Etihad Stadium (H)	35,848	6th
24	Saturday, 3 September (7:10 pm)	Carlton	9.12 (66)	**13.8 (86)**	Won by 20 points	MCG (A)	55,606	6th

=== 2011 Finals Series ===
**Final**	**Date and local time**	**Opponent**	**Scores** (St Kilda's scores indicated in **bold**)			**Venue**	**Attendance**
**Final**	**Date and local time**	**Opponent**	Home	Away	Result	**Venue**	**Attendance**
Second Elimination	Saturday 10 September (7.20pm)	Sydney	**8.9 (57)**	12.10 (82)	Lost by 25 points	Etihad Stadium (H)	39,205

Qualifying and elimination finals
10 September, MCG
1	**Collingwood**	**12.10 (82)**
4	West Coast	9.8 (62)
11 September, MCG
5	**Carlton**	**21.23 (149)**
8	Essendon	13.9 (87)
10 September, Etihad Stadium
6	St Kilda	8.9 (57)
7	**Sydney**	**12.10 (82)**
9 September, MCG
2	**Geelong**	**14.14 (98)**
3	Hawthorn	9.13 (67)

Semi-finals
17 September, Patersons Stadium
**West Coast**	**15.11 (101)**
Carlton	15.8 (98)
16 September, MCG
**Hawthorn**	**19.8 (122)**
Sydney	13.8 (86)

Preliminary finals
23 September, MCG
**Collingwood**	**10.8 (68)**
Hawthorn	9.11 (65)
24 September, MCG
**Geelong**	**17.15 (117)**
West Coast	10.9 (69)

Grand final
1 October, MCG
Collingwood	12.9 (81)
**Geelong**	**18.11 (119)**

== Ladder ==
2011 AFL ladder
Pos	Team	Pld	W	L	D	PF	PA	PP	Pts	
1	Collingwood	22	20	2	0	2592	1546	167.7	80	Finals series
2	Geelong (P)	22	19	3	0	2548	1619	157.4	76	Finals series
3	Hawthorn	22	18	4	0	2355	1634	144.1	72	Finals series
4	West Coast	22	17	5	0	2235	1715	130.3	68	Finals series
5	Carlton	22	14	7	1	2225	1700	130.9	58	Finals series
6	St Kilda	22	12	9	1	1891	1677	112.8	50	Finals series
7	Sydney	22	12	9	1	1897	1735	109.3	50	Finals series
8	Essendon	22	11	10	1	2217	2217	100.0	46	Finals series
9	North Melbourne	22	10	12	0	2106	2082	101.2	40	
10	Western Bulldogs	22	9	13	0	2060	2155	95.6	36	
11	Fremantle	22	9	13	0	1791	2155	83.1	36	
12	Richmond	22	8	13	1	2069	2396	86.4	34	
13	Melbourne	22	8	13	1	1974	2315	85.3	34	
14	Adelaide	22	7	15	0	1742	2193	79.4	28	
15	Brisbane Lions	22	4	18	0	1814	2240	81.0	16	
16	Port Adelaide	22	3	19	0	1718	2663	64.5	12	
17	Gold Coast	22	3	19	0	1534	2726	56.3	12	

Source: AFL ladder
Rules for classification: 1) points; 2) percentage; 3) number of points for.
(P) Premiers
