= 2006 St Kilda Football Club season =

St Kilda Football Club
2006 season
- President: Rod Butterss
- Coach: Grant Thomas
- Captain: Luke Ball
- Home ground: Telstra Dome (Capacity: 56,347); Aurora Stadium (Capacity: 19,500)
- NAB Cup: First Round (Lost 1.9.10 (73) to 2.8.8 (74) vs Collingwood, Match #7)
- Home and away season: 6th
- Finals series: Elimination Finalists (10.12 (72) to 13.12 (90) vs Melbourne, 2nd Elimination Final)
- Trevor Barker Award: Nick Riewoldt
- Leading goalkicker: Fraser Gehrig (71)
- Highest home attendance: 67,528 (8 September vs Melbourne, 2nd Elimination Final)
- Lowest home attendance: 15,282 (3 April vs Fremantle, Round 5)

The 2006 St Kilda Football Club season was the 110th in the club's history. Coached by Grant Thomas and captained by Luke Ball, they competed in the AFL's 2006 Toyota Premiership Season.

== Standings ==
2006 AFL ladder
Pos	Team	Pld	W	L	D	PF	PA	PP	Pts	
1	West Coast (P)	22	17	5	0	2257	1874	120.4	68	Finals series
2	Adelaide	22	16	6	0	2331	1640	142.1	64	Finals series
3	Fremantle	22	15	7	0	2079	1893	109.8	60	Finals series
4	Sydney	22	14	8	0	2098	1630	128.7	56	Finals series
5	Collingwood	22	14	8	0	2345	1965	119.3	56	Finals series
6	St Kilda	22	14	8	0	2074	1752	118.4	56	Finals series
7	Melbourne	22	13	8	1	2146	1957	109.7	54	Finals series
8	Western Bulldogs	22	13	9	0	2311	2173	106.4	52	Finals series
9	Richmond	22	11	11	0	1934	2245	86.1	44	
10	Geelong	22	10	11	1	1982	2002	99.0	42	
11	Hawthorn	22	9	13	0	1834	2140	85.7	36	
12	Port Adelaide	22	8	14	0	1911	2151	88.8	32	
13	Brisbane Lions	22	7	15	0	1844	2239	82.4	28	
14	Kangaroos	22	7	15	0	1754	2167	80.9	28	
15	Essendon	22	3	18	1	2021	2469	81.9	14	
16	Carlton	22	3	18	1	1791	2415	74.2	14	

Source: AFL ladder
Rules for classification: 1) points; 2) percentage; 3) number of points for.
(P) Premiers

== Players and staff ==
- 1 Justin Peckett
- 2 Aaron Hamill
- 3 Xavier Clarke
- 4 Andrew Thompson
- 5 Fergus Watts
- 6 Leigh Fisher
- 7 Lenny Hayes
- 8 Max Hudghton
- 9 Fraser Gehrig
- 10 Steven Baker
- 11 Leigh Montagna
- 12 Nick Riewoldt
- 13 Brett Voss
- 14 Luke Ball
- 15 Jason Gram
- 16 Raphael Clarke
- 17 Stephen Powell
- 18 Brendon Goddard
- 19 Sam Gilbert
- 20 Allan Murray
- 21 Matthew Ferguson
- 22 Aaron Fiora
- 23 Justin Koschitzke
- 24 Barry Brooks
- 25 Samuel Fisher
- 26 Nick Dal Santo
- 27 Jason Blake
- 28 Cain Ackland
- 29 Michael Rix
- 30 Mark McGough
- 31 Matt Maguire
- 32 Andrew McQualter
- 33 James Gwilt
- 34 Phillip Raymond
- 35 Robert Harvey
- 37 Justin Sweeney
- 38 Ed McDonnell (rookie list)
- 40 Troy Schwarze
- 44 Stephen Milne
- Cathal Corr (rookie list)
- Dylan Pfitzner (rookie list)
