= Bill Mohr =

Australian rules footballer, born 1909

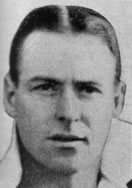

Personal information
- Born: 29 June 1909; Wagga Wagga, New South Wales
- Died: 29 March 1971 (aged 61)
- Original teams: Royal Stars, Wagga Wagga
- Height: 182 cm (6 ft 0 in)
- Weight: 80.5 kg (177 lb)
- Position: Forward

Playing career^{1}
Years	Club	Games (Goals)
1929–1941	St Kilda	195 (735)
- ^{1} Playing statistics correct to the end of 1941.

Career highlights
- VFL/AFL: VFL Leading Goalkicker Medal 1936; Victorian representative (18 games); Australian Football Hall of Fame; St Kilda Football Club: St Kilda best and fairest 1932, 1936; St Kilda captain 1937; 12× St Kilda leading goalkicker 1929–1940 (club record); St Kilda Team of the Century: half-forward flank

Wilbur T. "Bill" Mohr (29 June 1909 – 29 March 1971) was an Australian rules footballer who represented St Kilda in the Victorian Football League (VFL) during the 1930s.

== Early life ==
Mohr was born and raised in Wagga Wagga, New South Wales where he attended school at Wagga Demonstration and Wagga High schools. He played at Federal Football Club with his brother where his father was president before being recruited with his brother to the St Kilda Football Club.

== Career ==
Playing as a half-back flanker initially, Mohr later became one of the league's greatest full-forwards; he kicked 101 goals in 1936 (the first St Kilda player to kick more than 100 goals in a season) and was the VFL Leading Goalkicker in that year.

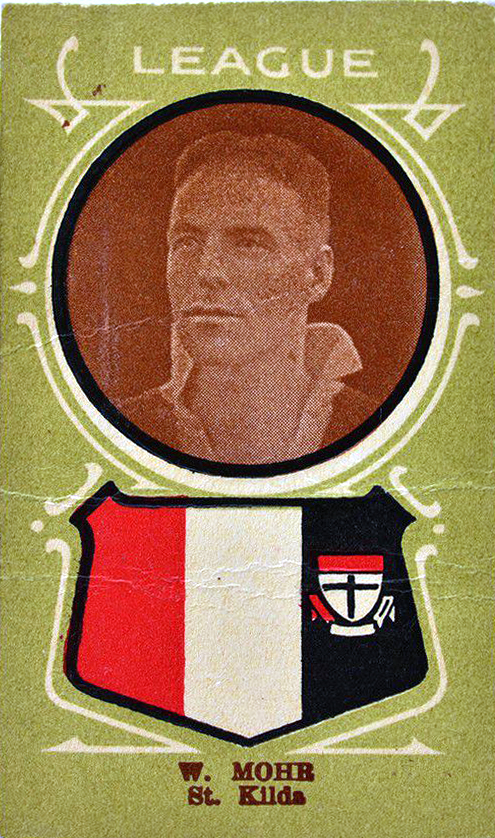
Bill Mohr, trading card, 1933

Mohr possessed an ability to kick straight from any angle, and he was one of the best exponents of the drop kick. He was appointed captain of St Kilda in 1937, and was the club's leading goalkicker in every season from 1929 to 1940. It was announced that at the start of his final season, 1941, he would play in defence. But in May that year, after having only played one game for the season, Mohr announced his retirement, saying that he felt he could not reach form and that it was also time to make way for a younger player.

In 1947, Essendon champion Dick Reynolds, in an article for the now-defunct Melbourne newspaper The Argus, wrote about Mohr that:

[He] was handicapped because he played with a team that had few successes. He was a clever position player, grand trier, and a remarkably straight kick.

In 1955, in an interview with The Argus, former South Melbourne champion Laurie Nash echoed similar sentiments about Mohr:

Bill Mohr was hampered by playing with a comparatively weak St. Kilda combination. In a stronger team he might easily have qualified for a higher place in full forward rankings. An extremely heady player, he was an accurate kick and dependable mark.

== Posthumous honours ==
Mohr was one of the first players inducted into the Australian Football Hall of Fame in 1996.

In St Kilda's Team of the Century, he was named on the half-forward flank to accommodate Tony Lockett at full-forward.
