= Charlie Baker (Australian footballer) =

Australian rules footballer and cricketer

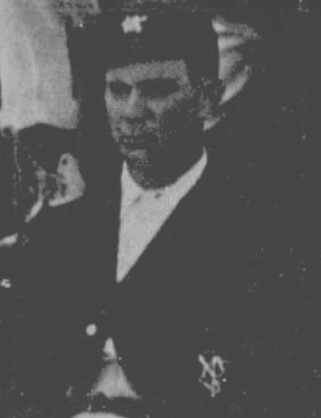

Personal information
- Full name: Charles Michael Baker
- Born: 18 June 1880; Ballarat East, Victoria
- Died: 4 May 1962 (aged 81); Ballarat, Victoria
- Original team: St Pats, Ballarat
- Height: 175 cm (5 ft 9 in)

Playing career^{1}
Years	Club	Games (Goals)
1902–1906	St Kilda	76 (122)
- ^{1} Playing statistics correct to the end of 1906.

Career highlights
- VFL leading goalkicker 1902; St Kilda leading goalkicker 1902, 1903, 1904 & 1905

Charles Michael Baker (18 June 1880 – 4 May 1962) was an Australian rules footballer who played in the Victorian Football League (VFL).

== Career ==
Recruited from St Patrick's College, Ballarat, he played 76 games for St Kilda from 1902 to 1906, and kicked 122 goals, including four of which came in his first VFL game; at the time, this was a club record. He represented Victoria in cricket and football from 1903 to 1905 before an injury ended his career.

Baker won the Leading Goalkicker Medal in 1902, a season in which St Kilda kicked only 64 goals for the year (of which Baker kicked 46.9%) and finished last without winning a match, a VFL/AFL record seven matches behind second-last-placed Geelong. Baker's proportion of his team's goals is also an VFL/AFL record.

== See also ==
- List of Victoria first-class cricketers
