= Jack Lonie =

Australian rules footballer

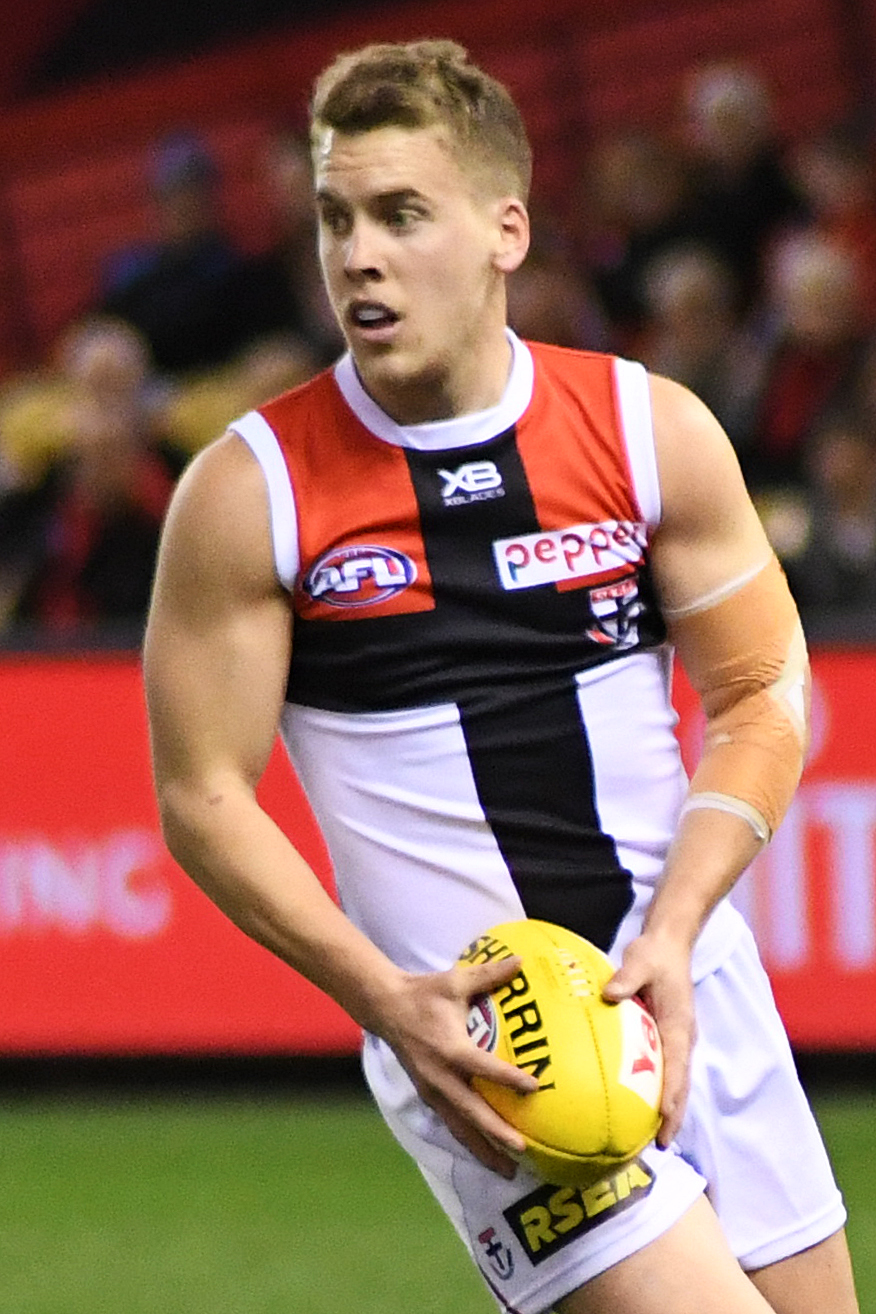
- Lonie playing for St Kilda in August 2018

Personal information
- Full name: Jack Lonie
- Born: 13 August 1996 (age 30)
- Original team: Dandenong Stingrays (TAC Cup)
- Draft: No. 41, 2014 national draft
- Height: 174 cm (5 ft 9 in)
- Weight: 70 kg (154 lb)
- Position: Forward

Playing career^{1}
Years	Club	Games (Goals)
2015-2021	St Kilda	87 (73)
- ^{1} Playing statistics correct to the end of 2020.

Career highlights
- AFL Rising Star nominee: 2015

Jack Lonie (born 13 August 1996) is an Australian rules football player. He played for the St Kilda Football Club in the Australian Football League (AFL) from 2015 to 2021.

== AFL career ==
Recruited from the Dandenong Stingrays in the TAC Cup, Lonie was drafted by the St Kilda Football Club with their fourth selection and forty-first overall in the 2014 national draft. He made his debut in the opening round of the 2015 season in the nine point loss to Greater Western Sydney at Etihad Stadium. In his twelfth match, he recorded eighteen disposals, five inside-50s, three marks, two tackles and a goal in the 110-point win over Essendon at Etihad Stadium to earn the round fourteen nomination for the 2015 AFL Rising Star.

During the 2016 season, Lonie was considered to have not played as well as he had in his debut season, as he played only 10 games, spending a large amount of the year playing for the VFL club Sandringham. Despite this, he drew positive attention for a three-goal performance in the final round of the year

In October 2018, Lonie signed a two-year contract extension with St Kilda, keeping him at the club until at least the end of 2020. During the 2019 season, Lonie's performance against the Western Bulldogs in round 18 was considered impressive.

In October 2021, Lonie was delisted by the St Kilda Football Club. He had played 87 games for the club. Since 2024 he has played for Cheltenham in the Southern Football Netball League.
