= Alan Richardson (footballer, born 1965) =

Australian rules footballer and coach

Personal information
- Full name: Alan R. Richardson
- Born: 17 May 1965 (age 61)
- Original team: East Burwood
- Height: 180 cm (5 ft 11 in)
- Weight: 83 kg (183 lb)
- Position: Defender

Playing career^{1}
Years	Club	Games (Goals)
1987–1996	Collingwood	114 (10)

Coaching career^{3}
Years	Club	Games (W–L–D)
2013	Port Adelaide	1 (0–1–0)
2014–2019	St Kilda	126 (43–81–2)
Total		127 (43–82–2)
- ^{1} Playing statistics correct to the end of 1996.^{3} Coaching statistics correct as of 2019.

Career highlights
- Joseph Wren Memorial Trophy 1988

Alan Richardson (born 17 May 1965) is a former Australian rules footballer who is the former senior coach of the St Kilda Football Club in the Australian Football League (AFL).

He was previously the Director of Coaching at Port Adelaide and had earlier roles as an assistant coach at the Western Bulldogs, Collingwood, Essendon, Carlton and Port Adelaide. He is a former player with Collingwood and played 114 senior games and now works as an assistant coach at the Melbourne Football Club.

== Playing career ==
Richardson had initially been listed at North Melbourne, where he played at reserves level, but was let go by the club without being able to break into the seniors.

=== Collingwood Football Club ===
A half back, he was given a second chance by Collingwood Football Club and made his league debut a week before his 22nd birthday, in 1987.

It was not until 1990 that he became a regular fixture in the Collingwood side and he participated in both qualifying finals against the West Coast Eagles, after the first was drawn. He also played in the semi-final win over Essendon, which saw Collingwood make the grand final, but cracked his collarbone when he collided with Adrian Burns. On the Thursday before the premiership decider, Richardson failed a fitness test after being bumped by his coach Leigh Matthews while walking off the ground. He was replaced by Shane Kerrison, a surprise inclusion ahead of Ron McKeown who had missed the semi-final. Richardson retired at the end of the 1996 season. Richardson played a total of 114 games and kicking 10 goals for Collingwood Football Club.

== Coaching career ==
=== Early coaching career ===
When his playing career ended, Richardson became a coach and was put in charge of his original club, East Burwood, in the Eastern Football League. He coached the seniors to premierships in 1999 and 2000. He was the senior coach of VFL club Coburg for the next two years.

=== Western Bulldogs ===
in 2003, he joined the Western Bulldogs as an assistant coach.

=== Collingwood Football Club ===
After three seasons at the Bulldogs, Richardson was appointed to Mick Malthouse's coaching staff at Collingwood and given the role of development manager.

=== Essendon Football Club ===
From 2008 to 2010 he was an assistant coach with Essendon.

=== Carlton Football Club ===
He joined the Carlton Football Club as an assistant coach in 2011, but was released at the end of the 2012 season because of the departure of senior coach Brett Ratten who was replaced by Mick Malthouse.

=== Port Adelaide Football Club ===
He then joined the Port Adelaide Football Club as a senior assistant and director of coaching for the 2013 season. On 4 May 2013, Richardson coached his first official AFL game as caretaker interim senior coach in place of regular senior coach Ken Hinkley, who was unavailable due to a virus. Port Adelaide under Richardson as stand-in senior coach for Hinkley, lost that game to North Melbourne by a margin of ten points in Round 6, 2013.

=== St Kilda Football Club ===
Richardson was appointed senior coach of St Kilda Football Club on 14 November 2013, when he replaced Scott Watters, who was sacked at the end of the 2013 season. Richardson received criticism by Port Adelaide over the late timing of the decision, being made only one week before the national draft.

Richardson's coaching career at St Kilda started well with three wins from their first five games, however, the club would win only one game (against then-second placed Fremantle in Round 18) for the remainder of the 2014 season and crash to its first wooden spoon since 2000. After coaching the team to the brink of finals in 2016 and 2017, the Saints fell to 16th place in 2018. The 2019 season saw considerable scrutiny applied to Richardson and his coaching tenure. Although the Saints won four of their first five games, their subsequent poor record where the Saints under Richardson sat fifteenth position on the ladder with six wins and ten losses, saw Richardson resign as St Kilda Football Club senior coach on 16 July 2019, in the middle of the 2019 season after Round 17, 2019. Richardson was then replaced by assistant coach Brett Ratten as caretaker senior coach of St Kilda Football Club for the remainder of the 2019 season, who was eventually appointed full-time senior coach of the St Kilda Football Club.

=== Melbourne Football Club ===
On 23 August, 2019, Richardson returned to coaching when he joined the Melbourne Football Club in an assistant coach role in preparation for the 2020 season. Richardson spent the 2020 season in the assistant coaching position as the club's director of coaching. Richardson was then appointed to the position of the club's General Manager of AFL Football Performance in 2021.

== Personal life ==
Richardson is married to Jo and they have two sons. He lives in the eastern suburbs of Melbourne.

== Statistics ==
=== Playing statistics ===
Legend
G	Goals	K	Kicks	D	Disposals	T	Tackles
B	Behinds	H	Handballs	M	Marks

Season	Team	No.	Games	Totals							Averages (per game)							Votes
Season	Team	No.	Games	G	B	K	H	D	M	T	G	B	K	H	D	M	T	Votes
1987	Collingwood	13	2	0	0	10	4	14	2	0	0.0	0.0	5.0	2.0	7.0	1.0	0.0	0
1988	Collingwood	13	4	0	0	34	23	57	13	2	0.0	0.0	8.5	5.8	14.3	3.3	0.5	0
1989	Collingwood	13	0	–	–	–	–	–	–	–	–	–	–	–	–	–	–	0
1990	Collingwood	13	18	7	5	170	73	243	45	12	0.4	0.3	9.4	4.1	13.5	2.5	0.7	0
1991	Collingwood	13	11	2	1	132	42	174	32	22	0.2	0.1	12.0	3.8	15.8	2.9	2.0	0
1992	Collingwood	13	22	1	1	289	124	413	79	41	0.0	0.0	13.1	5.6	18.8	3.6	1.9	0
1993	Collingwood	13	20	0	3	229	128	357	65	42	0.0	0.2	11.5	6.4	17.9	3.3	2.1	6
1994	Collingwood	13	11	0	0	75	51	126	29	11	0.0	0.0	6.8	4.6	11.5	2.6	1.0	0
1995	Collingwood	13	21	0	0	175	75	250	39	21	0.0	0.0	8.3	3.6	11.9	1.9	1.0	0
1996	Collingwood	13	5	0	1	32	16	48	11	10	0.0	0.2	6.4	3.2	9.6	2.2	2.0	0
Career			114	10	11	1146	536	1682	315	161	0.1	0.1	10.1	4.7	14.8	2.8	1.4	6

=== Coaching statistics ===
Statistics are correct to the end of the 2019 season

Legend
W	Wins	L	Losses	D	Draws	W%	Winning percentage	LP	Ladder position	LT	League teams

Season	Team	Games	W	L	D	W %	LP	LT
2013	Port Adelaide	1	0	1	0	0.0%	—N/a	18
2014	St Kilda	22	4	18	0	18.2%	18	18
2015	St Kilda	22	6	15	1	29.5%	14	18
2016	St Kilda	22	12	10	0	54.6%	9	18
2017	St Kilda	22	11	11	0	50.0%	11	18
2018	St Kilda	22	4	17	1	20.5%	16	18
2019	St Kilda	16	6	10	0	37.5%	15	18
Career totals		127	43	82	2	34.7%		
