= 2026 St Kilda Football Club season =

128th St Kilda Football Club season

St Kilda Football Club
2026 season
- President: Andrew Bassat
- Coach: Ross Lyon
- Captains: Callum Wilkie & Jack Sinclair
- Home ground: Marvel Stadium
- Pre-season: See below
- Home and away season: 11th
- Finals series: Did not qualify
- Leading goalkicker: Liam Ryan (33)
- Highest home attendance: 82,528 vs Collingwood (Opening Round)
- Lowest home attendance: 14,429 vs Gold Coast (Round 24)
- Average home attendance: 34,037

The 2026 St Kilda Football Club season was the 128th season in which the St Kilda Football Club competed in the Australian Football League (AFL), and the club's 142nd season overall.

Coached by Ross Lyon in his seventh season in charge, the club was led for the first time by co-captains Callum Wilkie and Jack Sinclair, following the departure of longtime captain Jack Steele to Melbourne during the 2025 trade period.

== Squad information ==
=== Playing squad ===
The playing squad and coaching staff of the St Kilda Football Club for the 2026 AFL season.

Senior list		Rookie list	Coaching staff
1 Jack Higgins; 2 Marcus Windhager; 3 Jack Silvagni; 4 Lance Collard; 5 Tobie Travaglia; 6 Jack Macrae; 7 Nasiah Wanganeen-Milera; 8 Bradley Hill; 9 Sam Flanders; 10 Mitch Owens; 11 Hunter Clark; 12 Max King; 13 Ryan Byrnes; 14 Liam Stocker; 15 Paddy Dow; 16 Dan Butler; 17 Isaac Keeler; 18 Jack Carroll; 19 Rowan Marshall	20 Dougal Howard; 21 Tom De Koning; 22 Darcy Wilson; 23 Liam Henry; 24 Angus Hastie; 25 Mattaes Phillipou; 26 Alix Tauru; 28 James Barrat; 30 Alex Dodson; 31 Liam Ryan; 32 Mason Wood; 34 Hugo Garcia; 35 Jack Sinclair (c); 36 Charlie Banfield; 37 Kye Fincher; 38 Hugh Boxshall; 43 Cooper Sharman; 44 Callum Wilkie (c); 47 Anthony Caminiti	33 Patrick Said; 39 Campbell Lake; 40 Max Hall; 42 Kobe McDonald (B); 45 Liam O'Connell; 46 Eamonn Armstrong (B)	Head coach: Ross Lyon; Assistant coaches: Jimmy Allan (back line); Robert Harvey (midfield); Brendon Bolton (forward line); Brendon Goddard (development); Dylan Shiel (development); Legend: (c) Captain(s); (vc) Vice-captain(s); (B) Category B rookie; italics - Inactive player list; Long-term injury; (ret.) Retired

=== List changes ===
Player	Reason	Details
Tom De Koning	In (free agency)	Signed from Carlton; pick 9 sent to Carlton as compensation
Jack Silvagni	In (free agency)	Signed from Carlton; pick 19 sent to Carlton as compensation
Sam Flanders	In (trade)	Traded from Gold Coast Suns for pick 7
Liam Ryan	In (trade)	Traded from West Coast Eagles for a 2027 third-round pick
Jack Steele	Out (trade)	Traded to Melbourne

=== Leadership ===
Callum Wilkie and Jack Sinclair were named co-captains ahead of the season — the club's 64th and 65th captains respectively — with Nasiah Wanganeen-Milera, Marcus Windhager and Mitch Owens elevated to the leadership group for the first time alongside Mason Wood. Lenny Hayes was appointed the club's General Manager of Football during the off-season.

== Pre-season ==
St Kilda played an unofficial match simulation against Gold Coast at People First Stadium on 19 February, before its AAMI Community Series match against Essendon at Mars Stadium, Ballarat, on 28 February.

**Date and local time**	**Opponent**	**Scores** (St Kilda's scores indicated in **bold**)			**Venue**	**Attendance**
**Date and local time**	**Opponent**	Home	Away	Result	**Venue**	**Attendance**
Thursday, 19 February, 7.45pm	Gold Coast	4.12 (36)	**16.11 (107)**	Won by 71 points	People First Stadium (A)	—
Saturday, 28 February, 3.10pm	Essendon	**17.13 (115)**	10.12 (72)	Won by 43 points	Mars Stadium (N)	—

== Premiership season ==
=== League table ===
Pos	Team	Pld	W	L	D	PF	PA	PP	Pts	Qualification
1	Fremantle	23	19	4	0	2286	1666	137.2	76	Finals series
2	Sydney	23	18	5	0	2543	1869	136.1	72	Finals series
3	Brisbane Lions (P)	23	16	7	0	2499	2054	121.7	64	Finals series
4	Hawthorn	23	15	6	2	2260	1881	120.1	64	Finals series
5	Geelong	23	15	8	0	2355	1925	122.3	60	Finals series
6	Adelaide	23	15	8	0	2169	1849	117.3	60	Finals series
7	Melbourne	23	15	8	0	2301	2099	109.6	60	Finals series
8	Western Bulldogs	23	13	9	1	1901	1992	95.4	54	Finals series
9	Collingwood	23	12	9	2	2021	1974	102.4	52	Finals series
10	Carlton	23	12	10	1	2007	1978	101.5	50	Finals series
**11**	St Kilda	**23**	**10**	**13**	**0**	**2030**	**1974**	**102.8**	40	
12	Greater Western Sydney	23	10	13	0	2073	2095	98.9	40	
13	Gold Coast	23	9	14	0	2011	2128	94.5	36	
14	North Melbourne	23	9	14	0	1932	2175	88.8	36	
15	Port Adelaide	23	7	16	0	1804	2048	88.1	28	
16	West Coast	23	4	19	0	1615	2333	69.2	16	
17	Richmond	23	3	20	0	1483	2373	62.5	12	
18	Essendon	23	2	21	0	1601	2478	64.6	8	

Source: afl.com.au
Rules for classification: 1) points; 2) percentage; 3) number of points for
(P) Premiers

=== Matches ===
The fixture for the 2026 season was released on 13 November 2025, with only the first 15 rounds released with dates and times for each match. The remainder of the fixture from round 16 was left as a floating fixture so as to prioritize the best matches for each round in prime-time slots, and dates were released progressively through the year.

Win Draw Loss Bye

**Rd**	**Date and local time**	**Opponent**	**Scores** (St Kilda's scores indicated in **bold**)			**Venue**	**Attendance**	**Ladder**
**Rd**	**Date and local time**	**Opponent**	Home	Away	Result	**Venue**	**Attendance**	**Ladder**
1	Sunday 8 March, 7.20pm	Collingwood	**9.12 (66)**	11.12 (78)	Lost by 12 points	MCG (H)	82,528	7th
2	Sunday 15 March, 3.15pm	Melbourne	18.12 (120)	**15.17 (107)**	Lost by 13 points	MCG (A)	44,577	14th
3	Saturday 21 March, 4.15pm	Greater Western Sydney	10.14 (74)	**11.12 (78)**	Won by 4 points	Sydney Showground (A)	9,149	10th
4	Saturday 28 March, 12.35pm	Brisbane Lions	**11.14 (80)**	17.11 (113)	Lost by 33 points	Marvel Stadium (H)	31,854	14th
5	**Bye Round**							14th
6	Sunday 12 April, 6.45pm	Port Adelaide	9.13 (67)	**12.9 (81)**	Won by 14 points	Adelaide Oval (A)	47,319	14th
7	Saturday 18 April, 7.05pm	Adelaide	15.13 (103)	**15.12 (102)**	Lost by 1 point	Adelaide Oval (A)	45,854	13th
8	Sunday 26 April, 1.10pm	West Coast	**22.11 (143)**	5.12 (42)	Won by 101 points	Marvel Stadium (H)	29,070	12th
9	Saturday 2 May, 7.35pm	Carlton	9.15 (69)	**16.12 (108)**	Won by 39 points	Marvel Stadium (A)	41,062	9th
10	Saturday 9 May, 6.40pm	Gold Coast	13.11 (89)	**8.12 (60)**	Lost by 29 points	Marrara Oval (A)	10,672	11th
11	Sunday 17 May, 3.15pm	Richmond	**16.13 (109)**	11.7 (73)	Won by 36 points	Marvel Stadium (H)	31,230	9th
12	Friday 22 May, 6.30pm	Fremantle	16.8 (104)	**11.8 (74)**	Lost by 30 points	Perth Stadium (A)	53,707	11th
13	Thursday 28 May, 7.30pm	Hawthorn	**9.13 (67)**	18.11 (119)	Lost by 52 points	Marvel Stadium (H)	33,476	12th
14	Sunday 7 June, 3.15pm	Sydney	15.14 (104)	**15.12 (102)**	Lost by 2 points	S.C.G. (A)	42,143	12th
15	Sunday 14 June, 3.15pm	Greater Western Sydney	**14.12 (96)**	13.10 (88)	Won by 8 points	Marvel Stadium (H)	17,748	10th
16	Sunday 21 June, 3.15pm	Western Bulldogs	**8.13 (61)**	12.11 (83)	Lost by 22 points	Marvel Stadium (H)	30,194	12th
17	**Bye Round**							13th
18	Sunday 5 July, 3.15pm	Essendon	7.8 (50)	**17.15 (117)**	Won by 67 points	Marvel Stadium (A)	34,713	12th
19	Saturday 11 July, 1.15pm	Port Adelaide	**13.9 (87)**	10.13 (73)	Won by 14 points	Marvel Stadium (H)	22,074	10th
20	Thursday 16 July, 7.30pm	Geelong	15.12 (102)	**11.9 (75)**	Lost by 27 points	Kardinia Park (A)	23,737	10th
21	Sunday 26 July, 3.15pm	North Melbourne	8.14 (62)	**13.15 (93)**	Won by 31 points	Marvel Stadium (A)	25,523	10th
22	Saturday 1 August, 1.05pm	Sydney	**13.10 (88)**	16.11 (107)	Lost by 19 points	Marvel Stadium (H)	32,512	11th
23	Sunday 9 August, 7.20pm	Carlton	**8.14 (62)**	16.10 (106)	Lost by 44 points	Marvel Stadium (H)	43,434	11th
24	Saturday 15 August, 12.35pm	Richmond	6.9 (45)	**14.10 (94)**	Won by 49 points	MCG (A)	35,850	11th
25	Thursday 20 August, 7.30pm	Gold Coast	**12.8 (80)**	14.19 (103)	Lost by 23 points	Marvel Stadium (H)	14,429	11th

== Milestones ==
- St Kilda's fixture opened with back-to-back games at the MCG — against Collingwood in the Opening Round and Melbourne in Round 2 — before the club's first match at Marvel Stadium came in Round 4 against reigning premiers Brisbane Lions.
- St Kilda played Port Adelaide as part of Gather Round at Adelaide Oval in Round 6, winning by 14 points.
- The club broke its all-time membership record earlier in a season than at any prior point in its history.
- Club legends Fraser Gehrig and Nick Riewoldt were inducted into the St Kilda Hall of Fame during the season.
- Co-captain Jack Sinclair suffered a serious calf injury in the opening minutes of the Round 15 win over the Western Bulldogs (Wikipedia note: originally reported as the round of injury; see reference), ending his season.
- Key forward Max King sustained a season-ending hamstring injury during the year.
- Veteran Brad Hill qualified for AFL Life Membership during the season.
- St Kilda unveiled a new club crest during the season.
- The club fielded a standalone reserves team in the Victorian Football League for the first time in 26 years, ending its affiliation with Sandringham.
