= 2025 St Kilda Football Club season =

127th St Kilda Football Club season

St Kilda Football Club
2025 season
- President: Andrew Bassat
- Coach: Ross Lyon
- Captain: Jack Steele
- Home ground: Marvel Stadium
- Pre-season: 1–0–1
- Home and away season: 12th
- Finals series: Did not qualify
- Best and fairest: Nasiah Wanganeen-Milera
- Leading goalkicker: Jack Higgins (46)
- Average home attendance: 29,776
- Club membership: 64,314

The 2025 St Kilda Football Club season was the 127th competing in the VFL/AFL and 141th season in the club's history. Coached by Ross Lyon and captained by Jack Steele, they competed in the AFL's 2025 Premiership Season.

== Squad information ==
=== Playing squad ===
The playing squad and coaching staff of the St Kilda Football Club for the 2025 AFL season.

Senior list		Rookie list	Coaching staff
1 Jack Higgins; 2 Marcus Windhager; 3 Zak Jones; 4 Lance Collard; 5 Tobie Travaglia; 6 Jack Macrae; 7 Nasiah Wanganeen-Milera; 8 Bradley Hill; 9 Jack Steele (c); 10 Mitch Owens; 11 Hunter Clark; 12 Max King; 13 Ryan Byrnes; 14 Liam Stocker; 15 Paddy Dow; 16 Dan Butler; 17 Isaac Keeler; 18 Jack Carroll; 19 Rowan Marshall	20 Dougal Howard; 21 Zaine Cordy; 22 Darcy Wilson; 23 Liam Henry; 24 Angus Hastie; 25 Mattaes Phillipou; 26 Alix Tauru; 27 Arie Schoenmaker; 28 James Barrat; 29 Jimmy Webster; 30 Alex Dodson; 32 Mason Wood; 33 Patrick Said; 34 Hugo Garcia; 35 Jack Sinclair (vc); 38 Hugh Boxshall; 42 Max Heath; 43 Cooper Sharman; 44 Callum Wilkie (vc)	31 Harry Boyd; 40 Max Hall; 41 Angus McLennan; 45 Liam O'Connell (B); 46 Eamonn Armstrong (B); 47 Anthony Caminiti	Head coach: Ross Lyon; Assistant coaches: Corey Enright (head of gameplan & strategy); Damian Carroll (head of development & learning); Jared Rivers (defence); Robert Harvey (midfield); Brendon Bolton (forwards); Brendon Goddard (VFL coach/development); Lenny Hayes (development coach); Legend: (c) Captain(s); (vc) Vice-captain(s); (B) Category B rookie; italics - Inactive player list; Long-term injury; (ret.) Retired

== Pre-season ==
A practice match against Carlton at Ikon Park was played on 22 February 2025, followed by the AAMI Community Series match against Port Adelaide at RSEA Park.

Win Draw Loss Bye

**Date and local time**	**Opponent**	**Scores** (St Kilda's scores indicated in **bold**)			**Venue**	**Attendance**
**Date and local time**	**Opponent**	Home	Away	Result	**Venue**	**Attendance**
Saturday, 22 February	Carlton	8.10 (58)	**10.9 (69)**	Won by 11 points	Ikon Park (A)	—
Saturday, 1 March	Port Adelaide	**7.7 (49)**	14.9 (93)	Lost by 44 points	RSEA Park (H)	—

== Premiership season ==
=== League table ===
Pos	Team	Pld	W	L	D	PF	PA	PP	Pts	Qualification
1	Adelaide	23	18	5	0	2278	1635	139.3	72	Finals series
2	Geelong	23	17	6	0	2425	1714	141.5	68	Finals series
3	Brisbane Lions (P)	23	16	6	1	2061	1804	114.2	66	Finals series
4	Collingwood	23	16	7	0	1991	1627	122.4	64	Finals series
5	Greater Western Sydney	23	16	7	0	2114	1834	115.3	64	Finals series
6	Fremantle	23	16	7	0	1978	1815	109.0	64	Finals series
7	Gold Coast	23	15	8	0	2173	1740	124.9	60	Finals series
8	Hawthorn	23	15	8	0	2045	1691	120.9	60	Finals series
9	Western Bulldogs	23	14	9	0	2493	1820	137.0	56	
10	Sydney	23	12	11	0	1845	1902	97.0	48	
11	Carlton	23	9	14	0	1799	1861	96.7	36	
**12**	St Kilda	**23**	**9**	**14**	**0**	**1839**	**2077**	**88.5**	36	
13	Port Adelaide	23	9	14	0	1705	2136	79.8	36	
14	Melbourne	23	7	16	0	1902	2038	93.3	28	
15	Essendon	23	6	17	0	1535	2209	69.5	24	
16	North Melbourne	23	5	17	1	1805	2365	76.3	22	
17	Richmond	23	5	18	0	1449	2197	66.0	20	
18	West Coast	23	1	22	0	1466	2438	60.1	4	

Source: afl.com.au
Rules for classification: 1) points; 2) percentage; 3) number of points for
(P) Premiers

=== Matches ===
The fixture for the 2025 season was released on 14 November 2024, with only the first 15 rounds released with dates and times for each match. The remainder of the fixtures from round 16 to 24 was left as a floating fixture so as to prioritize the best matches for each round in prime-time slots, and dates were released progressively through the year.

Win Draw Loss Bye

**Rd**	**Date and local time**	**Opponent**	**Scores** (St Kilda's scores indicated in **bold**)			**Venue**	**Attendance**	**Ladder**
**Rd**	**Date and local time**	**Opponent**	Home	Away	Result	**Venue**	**Attendance**	**Ladder**
1	**Bye Round**							—
2	Sunday 16 March, 12.05pm	Adelaide	21.9 (135)	**10.12 (72)**	Lost by 63 points	Adelaide Oval (A)	42,985	15th
3	Saturday 22 March, 7.35pm	Geelong	**15.8 (98)**	13.13 (91)	Won by 7 points	Marvel Stadium (H)	36,663	12th
4	Saturday 29 March, 4.15pm	Richmond	**20.15 (135)**	7.11 (53)	Won by 82 points	Marvel Stadium (H)	41,147	7th
5	Sunday 6 April, 2.50pm	Port Adelaide	10.12 (72)	**13.11 (89)**	Won by 17 points	Adelaide Oval (A)	34,201	7th
6	Sunday 13 April, 2.50pm	Greater Western Sydney	**12.10 (82)**	16.14 (110)	Lost by 28 points	Norwood Oval (N)	9,235	9th
7	Sunday 20 April, 7.20pm	Western Bulldogs	18.19 (127)	**8.8 (56)**	Lost by 71 points	Marvel Stadium (A)	35,511	12th
8	Saturday 26 April, 1.20pm	Brisbane Lions	**11.7 (73)**	17.16 (118)	Lost by 45 points	Marvel Stadium (H)	29,901	13th
9	Friday 2 May, 7.40pm	Fremantle	**14.10 (94)**	5.3 (33)	Won by 61 points	Marvel Stadium (H)	20,522	10th
10	Friday 9 May, 7.40pm	Carlton	**9.8 (62)**	11.11 (77)	Lost by 15 points	MCG (A)	65,680	12th
11	Sunday 18 May, 2.40pm	West Coast	16.12 (108)	**12.8 (80)**	Lost by 28 points	Perth Stadium (A)	42,860	13th
12	Sunday 25 May, 4.40pm	Gold Coast	**8.13 (61)**	12.8 (80)	Lost by 19 points	Marvel Stadium (H)	13,486	14th
13	Sunday 1 June, 2.50pm	Melbourne	7.21 (63)	**14.7 (91)**	Won by 28 points	Traeger Park (A)	6,721	11th
14	**Bye Round**							12th
15	Thursday 12 June, 7.30pm	Western Bulldogs	**8.12 (60)**	20.12 (132)	Lost by 72 points	Marvel Stadium (H)	20,508	14th
16	Saturday 21 June, 7.35pm	Collingwood	16.12 (108)	**11.8 (74)**	Lost by 34 points	Marvel Stadium (A)	43,039	15th
17	Sunday 29 June, 3.10pm	Fremantle	11.15 (81)	**9.15 (69)**	Lost by 12 points	Perth Stadium (A)	41,600	15th
18	Saturday 5 July, 7.40pm	Hawthorn	**10.14 (74)**	14.10 (94)	Lost by 20 points	Marvel Stadium (H)	36,035	15th
19	Sunday 13 July, 3.15pm	Sydney	**13.9 (87)**	14.8 (92)	Lost by 5 points	Marvel Stadium (H)	29,589	15th
20	Sunday 20 July, 1.10pm	Geelong	17.11 (113)	**12.10 (82)**	Lost by 31 points	Kardinia Park (A)	29,985	15th
21	Sunday 27 July, 3.15pm	Melbourne	**15.6 (96)**	13.12 (90)	Won by 6 points	Marvel Stadium (H)	22,570	14th
22	Sunday 3 August, 1.40pm	North Melbourne	**11.12 (78)**	10.9 (69)	Won by 9 points	Marvel Stadium (H)	31,978	14th
23	Saturday 9 August, 1.20pm	Richmond	8.8 (52)	**8.8 (56)**	Won by 4 points	MCG (A)	41,395	11th
24	Friday 15 August, 7.20pm	Essendon	11.9 (75)	**11.11 (77)**	Won by 2 points	Marvel Stadium (A)	31,107	11th
25	Sunday 24 August, 12.20pm	Greater Western Sydney	15.14 (104)	**14.9 (93)**	Lost by 11 points	Sydney Showground (A)	10,563	12th
