= St Kilda v Melbourne (2025 AFL season) =

2025 AFL Round 20
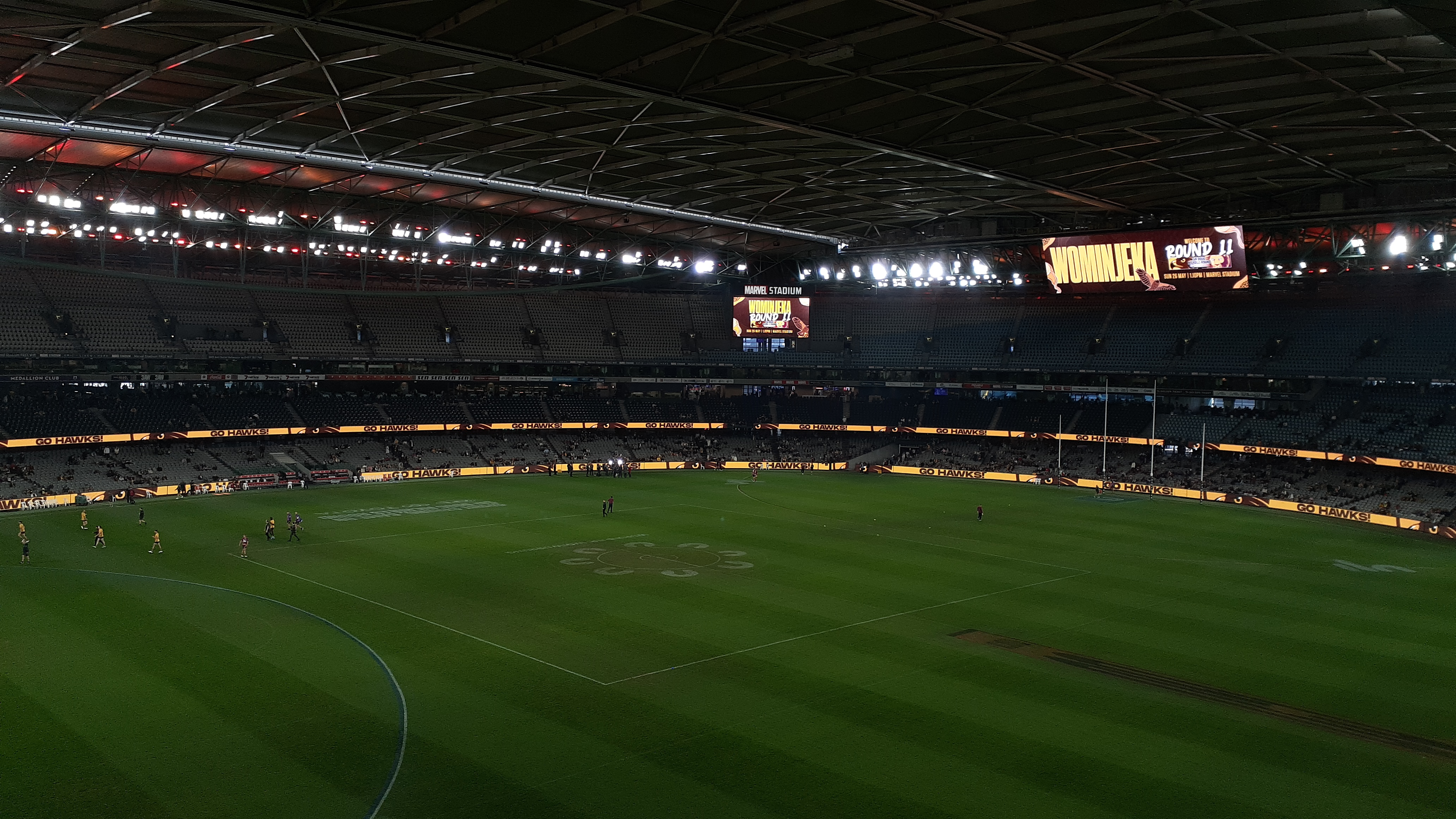

St Kilda	Melbourne
15.6 (96)	13.12 (90)
	1	2	3	4
STK	2.1 (13)	4.4 (28)	6.4 (40)	15.6 (96)
MEL	6.2 (38)	9.4 (58)	13.8 (86)	13.12 (90)
- Date: Sunday, 27 July (3:15 pm)
- Stadium: Marvel Stadium
- Attendance: 22,570
- Umpires: Jeff Dalgleish, Nick Brown, Martin Rodger, James Strybos

Accolades
- Best on Ground: Jack Viney

Broadcast in Australia
- Network: Seven Network, Fox Footy
- Commentators: Seven Network: Alister Nicholson, Jason Bennett; Fox Footy: Dwayne Russell, Kelli Underwood

In round 20, 2025, an Australian Football League (AFL) home-and-away match was played between St Kilda and Melbourne at Marvel Stadium in Melbourne on 27 July 2025.

Both sides were in the bottom six (Melbourne in 13th, and St Kilda in 15th) going into this match. St Kilda won the match by six points after trailing by 46 points at three-quarter-time, with Nasiah Wanganeen-Milera kicking the match-winning goal after the final siren to complete the biggest comeback from a three-quarter-time deficit in VFL/AFL history.

== Background ==
The match was held during Round 20 of the 2025 AFL season, at which point both St Kilda and Melbourne occupied places in the bottom six on the ladder (15th and 13th, respectively).

Going into the match, St Kilda had only won two of its previous fourteen matches, one of which was against Melbourne in Alice Springs in round 12 (in which the Demons kicked 7.21 (63)), while Melbourne had only won only once since round 11, against lowly North Melbourne at the Melbourne Cricket Ground in round 18. Melbourne were without key defenders Jake Lever and Steven May due to injury and suspension, respectively; despite this, Sportsbet offered them $1.82 for the victory with St Kilda at $2.02.

== Teams ==
St. Kilda	Melbourne

St Kilda
B:	26. Alix Tauru	44. Callum Wilkie	47. Anthony Caminiti
HB:	14. Liam Stocker	7. Nasiah Wanganeen-Milera	35. Jack Sinclair
C:	2. Marcus Windhager	6. Jack Macrae	27. Arie Schoenmaker
HF:	8. Bradley Hill	40. Max Hall	1. Jack Higgins
F:	10. Mitch Owens	32. Mason Wood	43. Cooper Sharman
Foll:	19. Rowan Marshall	11. Hunter Clark	9. Jack Steele (c)
Int:	3. Zak Jones	4. Lance Collard	13. Ryan Byrnes
Int:	24. Angus Hastie	38. Hugh Boxshall (substitute)	
Coach:	Ross Lyon		

Melbourne
B:	17. Jake Bowey	25. Tom McDonald	4. Judd McVee
HB:	6. Caleb Windsor	10. Daniel Turner	22. Blake Howes
C:	37. Kade Chandler	5. Christian Petracca	19. Harvey Langford
HF:	7. Jack Viney	31. Bayley Fritsch	20. Xavier Lindsay
F:	18. Jake Melksham	35. Harrison Petty	36. Kysaiah Pickett
Foll:	11. Max Gawn (c)	24. Trent Rivers	15. Ed Langdon
Int:	3. Christian Salem	13. Clayton Oliver	32. Tom Sparrow
Int:	2. Jacob van Rooyen	9. Charlie Spargo (substitute)	
Coach:	Simon Goodwin		

== Match summary ==
=== First quarter ===
Anthony Caminiti kicked the first goal of the match for St Kilda after one minute of play, but Melbourne would kick the next six goals, with Bayley Fritsch kicking three goals for the Demons, as well as Harvey Langford, Jack Viney and Xavier Lindsay contributing one goal each. Nasiah Wanganeen-Milera kicked his first goal late in the quarter to bring the quarter-time margin back to 25 points in Melbourne's favour.

=== Second quarter ===
Melbourne extended its quarter-time lead with goals from Jake Melksham, Kade Chandler and Christian Petracca to open up a 43-point lead. St Kilda managed to claw back two late goals through Jack Higgins and sixth-gamer Alix Tauru, who kicked his first career goal, to cut the half-time margin back to 30 points. St Kilda forward Lance Collard was substituted out of the match due to a foot injury he suffered in the first quarter, and was replaced by Hugh Boxshall.

=== Third quarter ===
Both teams traded goal for goal to begin the third quarter, with Melbourne's Xavier Lindsay and Wanganeen-Milera each scoring their second goal of the match. In a slower scoring quarter, back-to-back goals from Kysaiah Pickett and Jake Melksham allowed Melbourne to push the margin back past 40 points. Higgins' second goal for St Kilda back to 38 points, but Chandler's second goal for Melbourne came in quick succession. A behind from Melbourne forward Jacob van Rooyen in the dying seconds of the third quarter stretched the margin to a game-high 46 points at the final break.

=== Fourth quarter ===
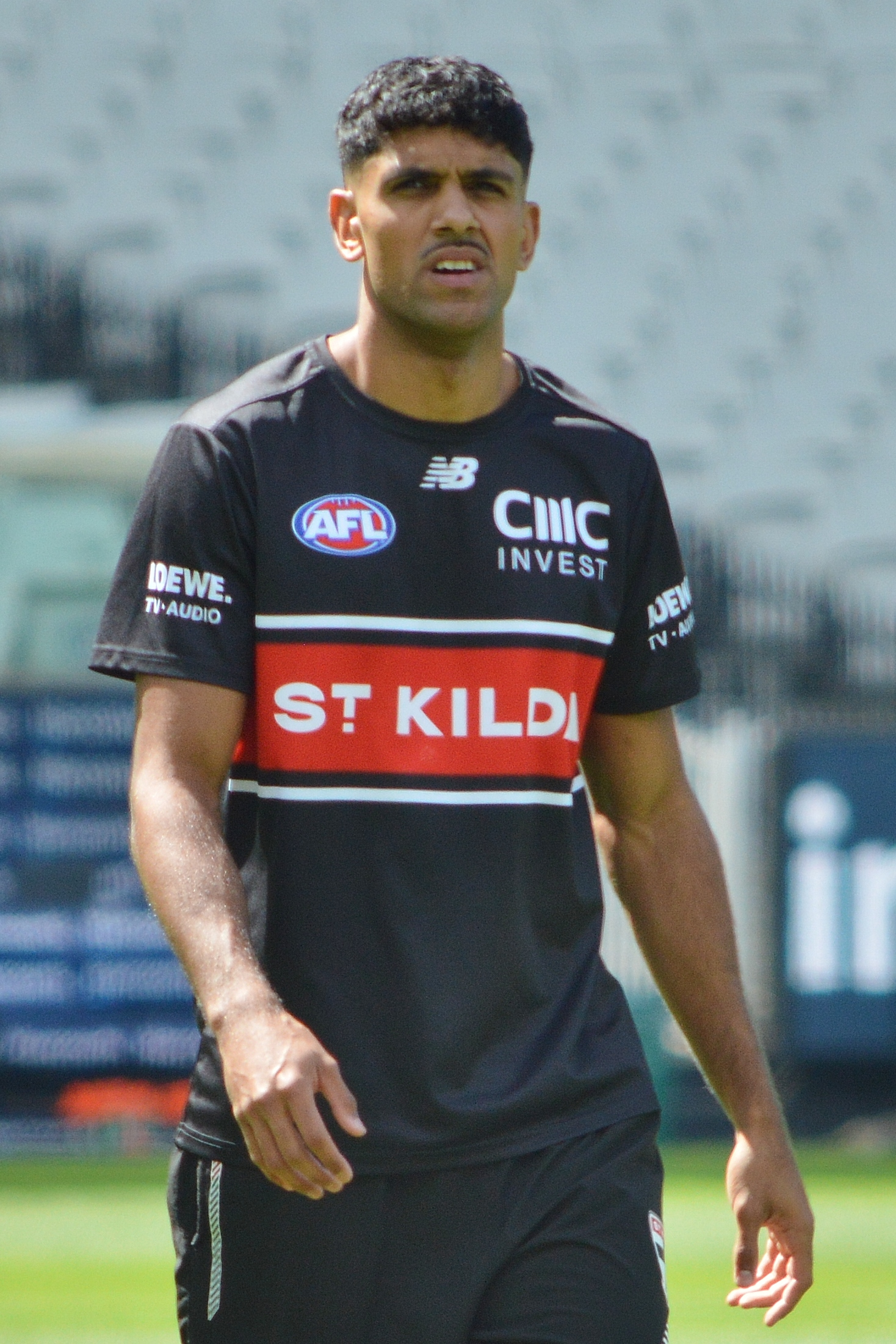
Nasiah Wanganeen-Milera's two goals in the final ten seconds of the match won the game for St Kilda.

Higgins' third goal came in the opening minute of the final term. St Kilda began to dominate the centre clearances, as Bradley Hill and Cooper Sharman added early goals to cut the margin back below 30 points. Melbourne managed to steady against St Kilda's early fight back, however missed opportunities from Clayton Oliver and Jake Melksham kept them from steadying the flow of the game. Captain Jack Steele and utility Mason Wood added back-to-back goals, before Sharman's second and Higgins' fourth cut the margin to just five points. A rushed behind to Melbourne appeared to once again steady control of the game as they held a one-goal lead, however, at this point, it had become a genuine arm-wrestle between the two teams.

With less than a minute remaining, Mason Wood kicked long inside forward 50 where Wanganeen-Milera took a spectacular mark over two Melbourne defenders and kicked his third goal of the game, levelling the scores with eight seconds remaining. At the following centre bounce, Melbourne made a 6–6–6 rule infringement, resulting in a free kick to Rowan Marshall. As a requirement of the 6-6-6 rule, Melbourne were required to reset in the formation before the free kick could be awarded to Marshall, allowing ample time for he and Wanganeen-Milera to plan a set play by directing players forward of the ball to one side of the field. Once awarded the free kick, Marshall wasted no time in kicking to the opposite side of the forward 50 where Wanganeen-Milera ran back with the flight and marked the resultant free kick before the final siren rang. Wanganeen-Milera kicked his fourth goal, resulting in St Kilda winning with a goal after the final siren.

In the final quarter alone, St Kilda kicked 9.2 (56) to 0.4 (4) to complete the comeback; it eclipsed the Brisbane Bears' comeback from a 45-point three-quarter-time deficit to defeat Hawthorn in round 16, 1995. The win ended a six-game losing streak for St Kilda, whose last win was also against Melbourne in round 12.

== Final scores ==
Round 20, 2025
Sunday, 27 July (3:15 pm)	St Kilda	def.	Melbourne	Marvel Stadium (crowd: 22,570)	Report; Stats
2.1 (13); 4.4 (28); 6.4 (40); 15.6 (96)	Q1; Q2; Q3; Final	6.2 (38); 9.4 (58); 13.8 (86); 13.12 (90)	Umpires: Jeff Dalgleish, Nick Brown, Martin Rodger, James Strybos
Higgins 4, Wanganeen-Milera 4, Sharman 2, Caminiti, Hill, Steele, Tauru, Wood	Goals	Fritsch 3, Lindsay 2, Melksham 2, Chandler, Langford, Petracca, Pickett, Viney
Wanganeen-Milera, Sinclair, Hall, Higgins, Macrae	Best	Gawn, Petracca, Oliver, Viney, Rivers, Fritsch

Brownlow Medal votes
3 J. Viney; 2 N. Wanganeen-Milera; 1 C. Petracca

== Aftermath and legacy ==
Melbourne coach Simon Goodwin was sacked over one week following the match, after the club was eliminated from finals contention for a second consecutive season. As of 2026, it has not won a final since winning the 2021 premiership. Melbourne president Brad Green, however, said the decision to sack Goodwin had nothing to do with the six-point loss to the Saints; but rather, a "four or five week" process.

In the weeks following the match, Nasiah Wanganeen-Milera re-signed with St Kilda for a further two seasons; he had come out of contract at the conclusion of the 2025 AFL season and had attracted plenty of interest from his native South Australia. Despite his match-winning efforts, Wanganeen-Milera received only two Brownlow Medal votes for the match, with Jack Viney receiving the maximum three votes and Christian Petracca receiving one vote; while Viney's 16 tackles for the match was a club record, the final votes drew much surprise and amusement from those present at the count, followed by criticism across the industry.

In a poll run by the AFL website in December 2025, the match was voted by the public as the best match of the 2025 season with more than 58 per cent of the vote.

== See also ==
- Essendon v Kangaroos (2001 AFL season)
- Brisbane Lions v Geelong (2013 AFL season)
- Greater Western Sydney v Brisbane Lions (2024 AFL semi-final)
