= 2025 Brownlow Medal =

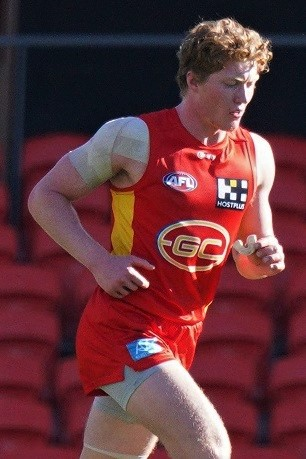
- 2025 Brownlow Medallist, Matt Rowell
- Date: Monday, 22 September 2025
- Location: Crown Palladium
- Hosted by: Hamish McLachlan and Rebecca Maddern
- Winner: Matt Rowell (Gold Coast)

Television/radio coverage
- Network: Seven Network

The 2025 Brownlow Medal was the 98th year the award was presented to the player adjudged the best and fairest player during the Australian Football League (AFL) home-and-away season. The count took place on Monday 22 September in Melbourne at the Crown Palladium, five days before the grand final. Matt Rowell of Gold Coast won the medal with 39 votes.

West Coast, who finished 18th with a 1–22 record, polled only 12 votes across all of their players combined, the lowest-ever tally for any club under the 3–2–1 voting system in a season of any length.

== Reaction ==
Rowell won the medal with 39 votes, the second highest voting score of all time under the 3–2–1 system at that time, behind only 2024 winner Patrick Cripps. The win and its dominance drew surprise, since he had been only fifth favourite in betting markets prior to the count; and several matches in which he polled votes despite not polling high in other media or coaches awards were analysed by commentators in the aftermath.

The 2025 count was also remembered for the votes in the round 20 match between St Kilda and Melbourne. St Kilda's Nasiah Wanganeen-Milera had 34 disposals and four goals, nine score involvements, six clearances, and kicked both the game-tying and game-winning goals inside the last eight seconds of St Kilda's victory – which had come after trailing by 46 points at three quarter time, the highest such deficit ever successfully overcome. His performance in the comeback had been described as "so prolific that it was almost instantly regarded as the best individual game of the season and perhaps of this generation". Wanganeen-Milera polled only two votes, with three going to Melbourne's Jack Viney – causing much surprise and amusement to those at the count, followed by controversy and discussion in the days which followed.

In part response, the rules governing voting were changed to provide player match statistics to umpires from the 2026 season to help to inform their voting.

== Leading vote-getters ==
=== Overall ===
	Player	Club	Votes
1st	Matt Rowell	Gold Coast	39
2nd	Nick Daicos	Collingwood	32
3rd	Bailey Smith	Geelong	29
4th	Jordan Dawson	Adelaide	27
5th	Andrew Brayshaw	Fremantle	26
=6th	Noah Anderson	Gold Coast	25
=6th	Marcus Bontempelli	Western Bulldogs	25
=6th	Caleb Serong	Fremantle	25
=9th	Max Gawn	Melbourne	23
=9th	Nasiah Wanganeen-Milera	St Kilda	23

=== Most votes per club ===
Club rank	Overall rank (Note: Taking into account eligibility, i.e. excluding suspended players)	Player	Club	Votes
1st	1st	Matt Rowell	Gold Coast	39
2nd	2nd	Nick Daicos	Collingwood	32
3rd	3rd	Bailey Smith	Geelong	29
4th	4th	Jordan Dawson	Adelaide	27
5th	5th	Andrew Brayshaw	Fremantle	26
6th	=6th	Marcus Bontempelli	Western Bulldogs	25
=7th	=9th	Max Gawn	Melbourne	23
=7th	=9th	Nasiah Wanganeen-Milera	St Kilda	23
=9th	=11th	Hugh McCluggage	Brisbane Lions	21
=9th	=11th	Finn Callaghan	Greater Western Sydney	21
=9th	=11th	Zak Butters	Port Adelaide	21
=9th	=11th	Chad Warner	Sydney	21
13th	=15th	Tim Taranto	Richmond	20
14th	18th	Patrick Cripps	Carlton	19
15th	=20th	Jai Newcombe	Hawthorn	17
16th	=27th	Zach Merrett	Essendon	14
17th	=32nd	Luke Davies-Uniacke	North Melbourne	11
18th	=91st	Harley Reid	West Coast	3
18th	=91st	Liam Ryan	West Coast	3

== Voting procedure and eligibility ==
The four field umpires (those umpires who control the flow of the game, as opposed to goal or boundary umpires) confer after each match and award three votes, two votes, and one vote to the players they regard as the best, second-best and third-best in the match, respectively. The votes are kept secret until the awards night, and they are read and tallied on the evening.

Any suspension throughout the home-and-away season renders a player ineligible to win the award. However, umpires must still award votes to any player they deem worthy, and all votes are tallied regardless of ineligibility.

In the event of an ineligible player receiving the most votes, the next eligible player is awarded the Brownlow Medal.

There is no countback if there is a tie on votes, with joint winners awarded.
