= Bill Gleeson =

Australian rules footballer

Personal information
- Full name: William Joseph Gleeson
- Born: 4 July 1931
- Died: 17 September 1998 (aged 67)
- Original team: Mentone
- Height: 173 cm (5 ft 8 in)
- Weight: 70 kg (154 lb)
- Position: Rover

Playing career^{1}
Years	Club	Games (Goals)
1955–56	St Kilda	15 (11)
- ^{1} Playing statistics correct to the end of 1956.

William Joseph Gleeson (4 July 1931 – 17 September 1998) was an Australian rules footballer who played with St Kilda in the Victorian Football League (VFL). His grandson, Jack Sinclair, has played for St Kilda since 2015.
