= Brad Hill =

Brad, Bradford or Bradley Hill may refer to:

- Brad Hill (baseball) (born 1962), American baseball coach
- Bradford Hill (born 1967), American politician
- Brad Hill (basketball) (born 1986), Australian basketball player
- Brad Hill (athlete) (active 1988), Australian Paralympic athlete
- Brad Hill (producer) (born 1981), American record producer
- Bradley Hill (footballer) (born 1993), Australian rules footballer

== See also ==
- Brad Hills, English footballer
- Bradford Dudley Hill, an English rugby league club based in Bradford, West Yorkshire
- Bradford Hill criteria, a group of minimal conditions necessary to provide adequate evidence of a causal relationship between an incidence and a consequence
- Bradley hill fort, an Iron Age hill fort in the county of Cheshire in northern England
- Bradley Hills Presbyterian Church, a Presbyterian Church in Bethesda, Maryland
- Buckshraft Mine & Bradley Hill Railway Tunnel, a Site of Special Scientific Interest in Gloucestershire, England
- Hill (surname)
