= Xavier Lindsay =

Australian rules footballer (born 2006)

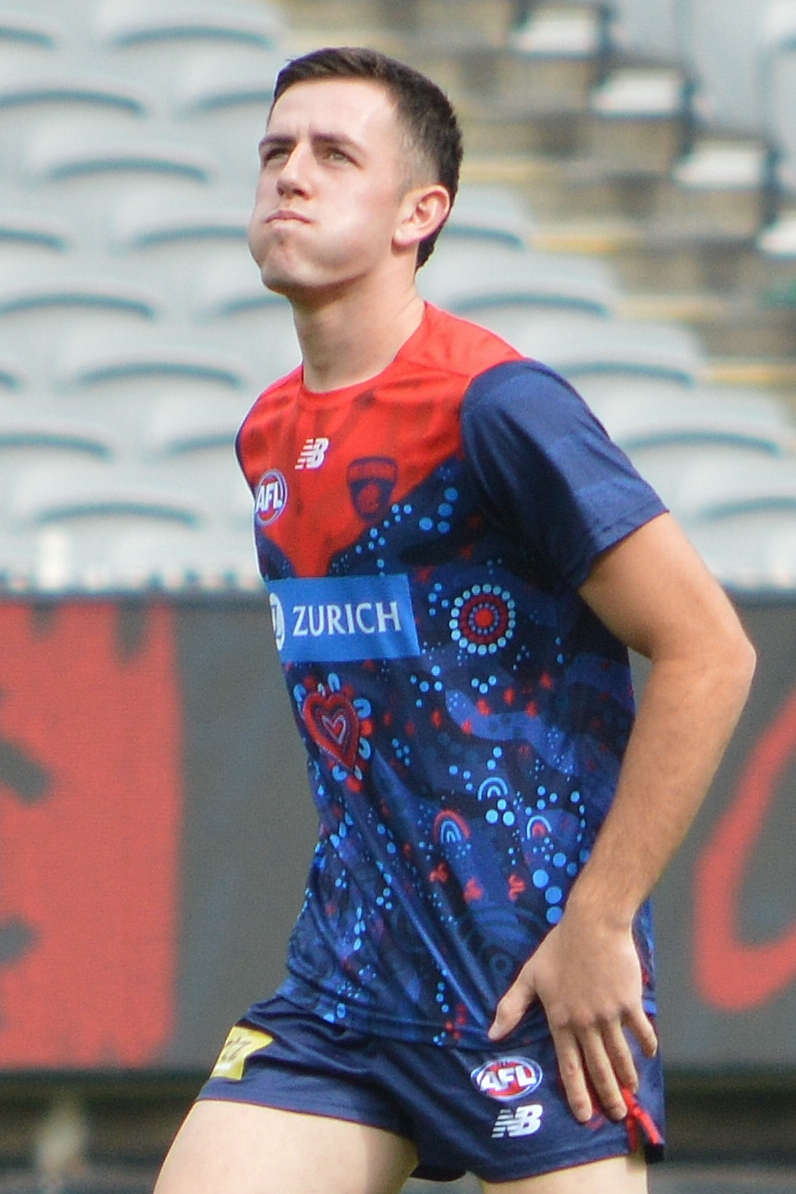
- Lindsay in April 2025

Personal information
- Born: 3 August 2006 (age 20)
- Original team: Gippsland Power
- Draft: No. 11, 2024 AFL draft
- Debut: 16 March 2025, Melbourne vs. Greater Western Sydney, at MCG
- Height: 183 cm (6 ft 0 in)
- Position: Midfielder

Club information
- Current club: Melbourne
- Number: 5

Playing career^{1}
Years	Club	Games (Goals)
2025–	Melbourne	23 (3)
- ^{1} Playing statistics correct to the end of round 22, 2026.

Career highlights
- AFL Rising Star nominee: 2025

Xavier Lindsay (born 3 August 2006) is a professional Australian rules footballer playing for the Melbourne Football Club in the Australian Football League (AFL).

Lindsay won the Morrish Medal in 2024 playing for Gippsland Power. He was selected by the Melbourne Football Club with pick 11 in the 2024 AFL draft. He made his debut in round one of the 2025 AFL season against the Greater Western Sydney Giants.

He was nominated for the 2025 AFL Rising Star after his round 7 game against Richmond.

== Statistics ==
Updated to the end of round 22, 2026.

Legend
G	Goals	K	Kicks	D	Disposals	T	Tackles
B	Behinds	H	Handballs	M	Marks

Season	Team	No.	Games	Totals							Averages (per game)							Votes
Season	Team	No.	Games	G	B	K	H	D	M	T	G	B	K	H	D	M	T	Votes
2025	Melbourne	20	18	2	6	139	105	244	57	33	0.1	0.3	7.7	5.8	13.6	3.2	1.8	0
2026	Melbourne	5	5	1	0	59	23	82	11	11	0.2	0.0	11.8	4.6	16.4	2.2	2.2	0
Career			23	3	6	198	128	326	68	44	0.1	0.3	8.6	5.6	14.2	3.0	1.9	0
