= Nasiah Wanganeen-Milera =

Australian rules footballer (born 2003)

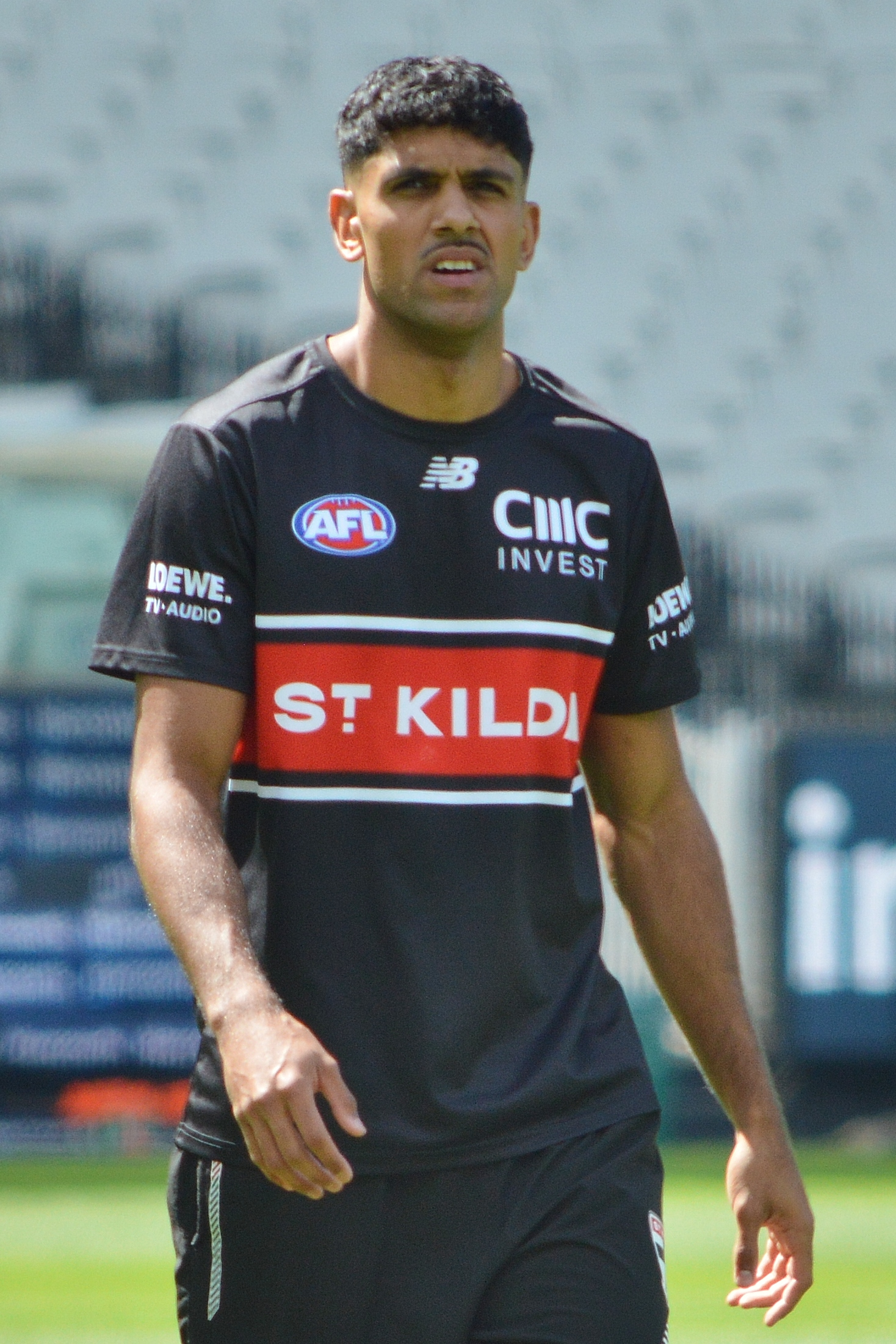
- Wanganeen-Milera in March 2026

Personal information
- Full name: Nasiah Wanganeen-Milera
- Nickname: Nas
- Born: 22 February 2003 (age 23)
- Original team: Glenelg (SANFL)
- Draft: No. 11, 2021 national draft
- Debut: Round 1, 2022, St Kilda vs. Collingwood, at Marvel Stadium
- Height: 187 cm (6 ft 2 in)
- Weight: 71 kg (157 lb)
- Position: Midfielder

Club information
- Current club: St Kilda
- Number: 7

Playing career^{1}
Years	Club	Games (Goals)
2022–	St Kilda	103 (42)

Representative team honours^{2}
Years	Team	Games (Goals)
2025	Indigenous All-Stars	1 (0)
- ^{1} Playing statistics correct to the end of the 2026 season.^{2} Representative statistics correct as of 2025.

Career highlights
- 2x All-Australian team: 2025, 2026; Trevor Barker Award: 2025

Nasiah Wanganeen-Milera (born 22 February 2003) is a professional Australian rules footballer playing for the St Kilda Football Club in the Australian Football League (AFL). He was selected in the 2025 & 2026 All-Australian teams and won the Trevor Barker Award in 2025.

== Early life ==
He is the nephew of former Port Adelaide and Essendon legend Gavin Wanganeen, and the step son of former St Kilda player Terry Milera.

His biological father is former North Melbourne player Eddie Sansbury.

In his draft year of 2021, Wanganeen-Milera played for grand finalists Glenelg in the SANFL, playing four games in the seniors and the remainder in the reserves. He averaged 15.8 disposals, 3.9 marks, 2.5 tackles and 2.4 inside 50s in 13 games for the reserves side. In his four senior games he averaged 11 disposals and three marks. Wanganeen-Milera helped the Tigers reserves claim the Reserves premiership, kicking a goal and gathering 19 touches in the Grand Final win over Central Districts. Wanganeen-Milera was also selected for the NAB AFL Academy team as well as the South Australian U18 team to compete at the National Championships. He was part of Port Adelaide's Indigenous Academy team.

== AFL career ==
Wanganeen-Milera was selected with St Kilda's first pick in the 2021 national draft, at number 11 overall. Wanganeen-Milera made his debut in round 1, 2022 against Collingwood, but did not take the field as an unused medical substitute. He made his on-field debut a week later against Fremantle, having 13 disposals.

Taken under the wing of St Kilda assistant coach Corey Enright, Wanganeen-Milera developed into a hard-working defender who would transition into the midfield.

Wanganeen-Milera kicked the last two goals in St Kilda's famous come-from-behind victory against Melbourne in round 20, 2025. St Kilda had come back from a VFL/AFL record 46-point three-quarter time deficit to trail by only six points, before Wanganeen-Milera took a high mark and kicked the equalising goal with eight seconds remaining; then, Melbourne conceded a free kick at the ensuing centre bounce for a 6–6–6 infringement, and St Kilda quickly kicked forward to Wanganeen-Milera, who marked and kicked the winning goal after the siren. With 34 disposals and four goals for the match, Wanganeen-Milera's overall performance was celebrated as one of the best individual matches in recent memory – and there was much surprise and amusement when he received only two Brownlow Medal votes for the performance.

Out of contract, attracting interest and long-term offers from both clubs in his native South Australia, in August 2025 Wanganeen-Milera signed a two-year contract extension with St Kilda worth more than $2 million per year, setting a new record for the highest per-season wage of any player in VFL/AFL history. Wanganeen-Milera capped off his successful 2025 season on an individual level with his first All-Australian team selection and Trevor Barker Award.

== Statistics ==
Updated to the end of the 2026 season.

Legend
G	Goals	K	Kicks	D	Disposals	T	Tackles
B	Behinds	H	Handballs	M	Marks
†	Led the league for the season

Season	Team	No.	Games	Totals							Averages (per game)							Votes
Season	Team	No.	Games	G	B	K	H	D	M	T	G	B	K	H	D	M	T	Votes
2022	St Kilda	7	17	1	6	166	65	231	82	32	0.1	0.4	9.8	3.8	13.6	4.8	1.9	0
2023	St Kilda	7	24	4	2	419	144	563	150	49	0.2	0.1	17.5	6.0	23.5	6.3	2.0	4
2024	St Kilda	7	22	1	7	436	129	565	146	38	0.0	0.3	19.8	5.9	25.7	6.6	1.7	8
2025	St Kilda	7	23	17	18	512	176	688	121	52	0.7	0.8	22.3^{†}	7.7	29.9	5.3	2.3	23
2026	St Kilda	7	17	19	13	365	130	495	50	44	1.1	0.8	21.5	7.6	29.1	2.9	2.6	25
Career			103	42	46	1898	644	2542	549	215	0.4	0.4	18.4	6.3	24.7	5.3	2.1	60
