= Cooper Sharman =

Australian rules footballer

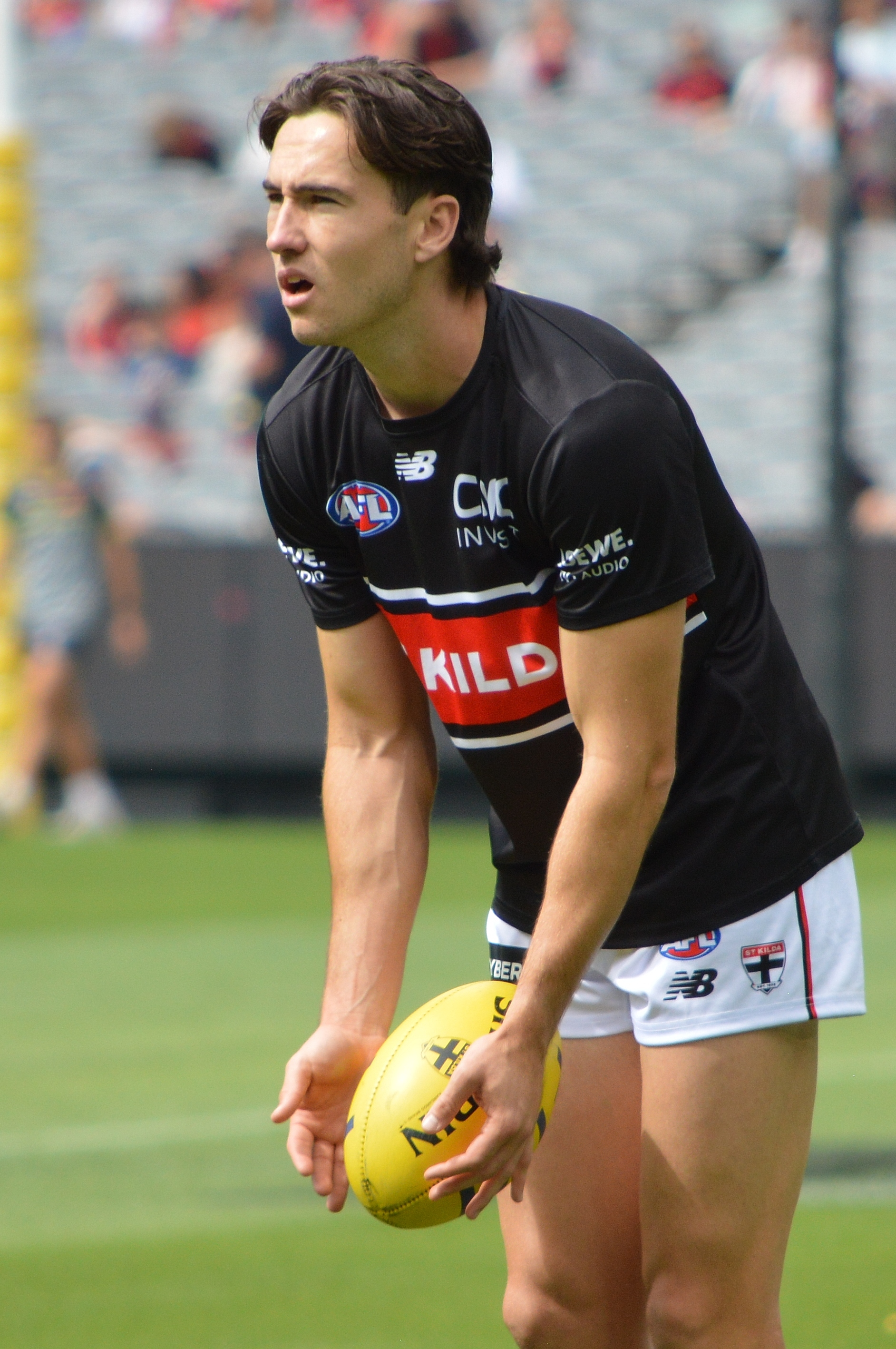
- Sharman in March 2026

Personal information
- Born: 25 July 2000 (age 26)
- Original team: Woodville-West Torrens
- Draft: No. 21, 2021 mid-season rookie draft
- Debut: Round 19, 2021 (unused medical sub), St Kilda vs. West Coast, at Perth Stadium
- Height: 193 cm (6 ft 4 in)
- Weight: 83 kg (183 lb)
- Position: Forward

Club information
- Current club: St Kilda
- Number: 43

Playing career^{1}
Years	Club	Games (Goals)
2021–	St Kilda	89 (104)
- ^{1} Playing statistics correct to the end of round 22, 2026.

Cooper Sharman (born 25 July 2000) is a professional Australian rules footballer playing for the St Kilda Football Club in the Australian Football League (AFL). He was drafted as a 21-year-old in the 2021 mid-season rookie draft at pick number 21 overall.

== Early life ==
Sharman was a participant the Auskick program at Leeton in the Riverina District of New South Wales where he played for the Leeton-Whitton Crows as a junior and was also a part of the GWS Giants Academy. Following high school, Sharman moved to Melbourne where he studied business and commerce at Deakin University. While in Melbourne he played for the Balwyn Football Club, in the local Eastern Football League, under the former AFL coach Rodney Eade. Sharman played alongside AFL elite junior talent in his 2019 season with representative junior side Oakleigh Chargers including Matt Rowell, Noah Anderson and Jamarra Ugle-Hagan, which also limited his game time to about one third of the season. Sharman ultimately kicked 13 goals at Balwyn. Sharman's form at Balwyn earned him selection for the Oakleigh Chargers where he finished with 20 disposals, five marks and one goal on debut. He played eight games (kicking 14 goals) including a premiership as a Charger. He averaged 12.7 disposals, 4.5 marks and kicked 11 goals in the NAB League including four goals against the Eastern Ranges. Sharman was spotted by recruiters and invited to the 2019 AFL Combine and eventually nominated for the 2019 AFL draft. Sharman was ultimately overlooked by all 18 clubs. Sharman joined South Australian side Woodville-West Torrens Eagles ahead of the 2021 season, playing two SANFL games and six games (15 goals) for their reserves. Sharman initially had signed with the Victorian Football League's Coburg Football Club for 2020, but only played in one practice match with the whole season being wiped out due to the COVID-19 pandemic and the Victorian lockdowns that occurred as a result. He would return to NSW to play for Leeton-Whitton in a Grand Final which they lost.

== AFL career ==
Sharman nominated for the 2021 Mid Season Draft and was selected by St Kilda with their second pick, number 21. Sharman was initially expected to stay in South Australia following his drafting, however after one further game for the Eagles he was flown to Sydney as injury coverage ahead of the Saints' Round 12 clash with Sydney. Although not named in the squad, Sharman met and trained with his new teammates for the first time while in Sydney. Sharman then moved to Melbourne and lived with teammate Mason Wood. Sharman made his 'debut' as an unused medical substitute in Round 19 against West Coast. The following week, he was again named as the medical sub in the round 20 clash with Carlton. Sharman replaced injured defender Dougal Howard in the second half, earning his first real AFL match. Sharman had just 39% time-on-ground, but made an immediate impact up forward with eight disposals, four marks and two goals. Sharman then played the final three games of the season, kicking two goals against both Geelong and Sydney and collecting 15 disposals, six marks and four goals in the final match against Fremantle. Following his good form in the four games in which he had time on the ground, Sharman was rewarded with a two-year extension to his contract.

== Statistics ==
Updated to the end of round 22, 2026.

Legend
G	Goals	K	Kicks	D	Disposals	T	Tackles
B	Behinds	H	Handballs	M	Marks

Season	Team	No.	Games	Totals							Averages (per game)							Votes
Season	Team	No.	Games	G	B	K	H	D	M	T	G	B	K	H	D	M	T	Votes
2021	St Kilda	43	5	10	4	27	17	44	19	8	2.0	0.8	5.4	3.4	8.8	3.8	1.6	1
2022	St Kilda	43	10	3	1	62	23	85	32	7	0.3	0.1	6.2	2.3	8.5	3.2	0.7	0
2023	St Kilda	43	16	15	5	97	49	146	57	23	0.9	0.3	6.1	3.1	9.1	3.6	1.4	0
2024	St Kilda	43	18	18	12	117	56	173	69	33	1.0	0.7	6.5	3.1	9.6	3.8	1.8	0
2025	St Kilda	43	21	34	22	165	77	242	114	35	1.6	1.0	7.9	3.7	11.5	5.4	1.7	2
2026	St Kilda	43	19	24	19	131	84	215	86	21	1.3	1.0	6.9	4.4	11.3	4.5	1.1	0
Career			89	104	63	599	306	905	377	127	1.2	0.7	6.7	3.4	10.2	4.2	1.4	3
