= Jack Higgins (Australian footballer) =

Australian rules footballer (born 1999)

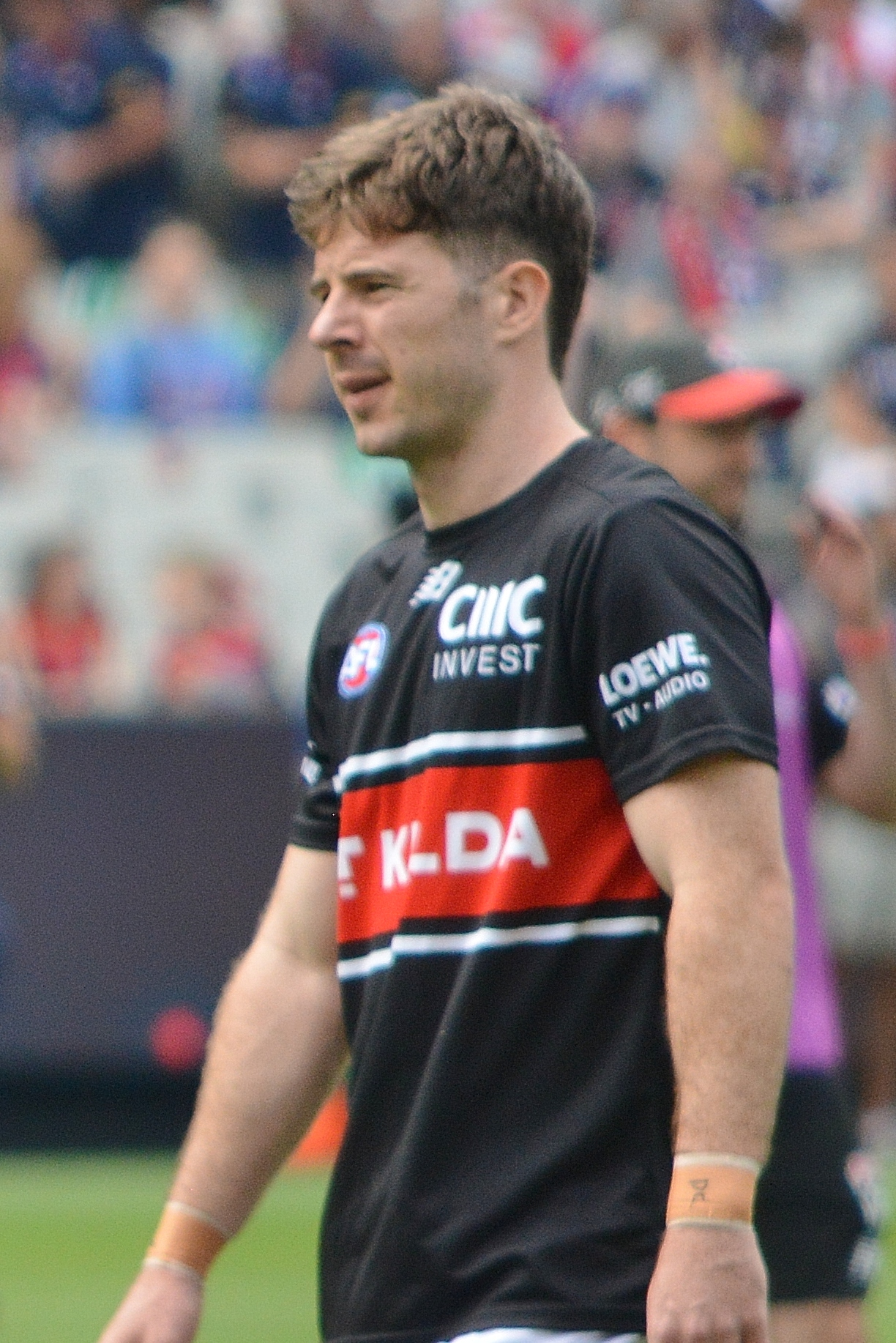
- Higgins playing for St Kilda in March 2026

Personal information
- Nicknames: Snags, Higgo, Hig
- Born: 19 March 1999 (age 27)
- Original team: Oakleigh Chargers (TAC Cup)/East Malvern Knights (SMJFL)
- Draft: No. 17, 2017 AFL national draft
- Debut: Round 3, 2018, Richmond vs. Hawthorn, at MCG
- Height: 177 cm (5 ft 10 in)
- Weight: 76 kg (168 lb)
- Position: Forward / midfielder

Club information
- Current club: St Kilda
- Number: 1

Playing career^{1}
Years	Club	Games (Goals)
2018–2020	Richmond	43 (29)
2021–	St Kilda	117 (203)
Total		158 (229)
- ^{1} Playing statistics correct to the end of round 22, 2026.

Career highlights
- AFL Goal of the Year: 2018; 3× St Kilda leading goalkicker: 2023, 2024, 2025; AFL Rising Star nominee: 2018; Cosgrove–Jenkins Award (RFC Best First-Year Player): 2018; Morrish Medal: 2017

Jack Higgins (born 19 March 1999) is a professional Australian rules footballer playing for the St Kilda Football Club in the Australian Football League (AFL). He previously played 43 games over three seasons at Richmond. As a junior, Higgins was named All-Australian at the 2017 AFL Under-18 Championships and won the Morrish Medal as the best player in the Victorian junior state league, the TAC Cup. He was drafted by Richmond with the last pick of the first round in the 2017 AFL national draft and made his debut for the club in Round 3 of the 2018 season. In his debut season, he earned the AFL Goal of the Year award and placed fourth in the league Rising Star award. Higgins missed a significant part of the 2019 season after undergoing surgery for a brain condition. In the 2020/21 off-season, he was traded to St Kilda in a multipiece deal that principally involved a second-round draft pick.

== Early life and junior football ==
Higgins spent his formative years in Caulfield, a suburb 10 kilometres south-east of Melbourne. Higgins grew up as a passionate St Kilda fan.

He first played competitive football with Ormond Football Club in the South Metro Junior Football League before later moving to play for East Malvern Junior Football Club in the same league. Higgins was an impressive junior player and leader, captaining his side to a Division 1 premiership at under-13 level in 2012 in which he was named grand final best on ground. Higgins showed intense dedication to the sport from a young age, learning to kick proficiently on both legs by age 10 and working with a specialist running coach from age 13.

His first representative football experience came when he joined the Oakleigh Chargers under-16s development program. Soon after he was named the best player at the under-16 national championships while representing the Victorian Metropolitan region in 2015.

The following year, he played his first top-level matches for Oakleigh's TAC Cup side, making 10 appearances and kicking 19 goals across the season and finals. Despite being a year below draft eligibility, Higgins led the competition for average score involvements (8.9 per game) and averaged a stunning 26.7 disposals per game. His average of 145 Champion Data ranking points per game also placed him fourth in the league, behind top-age players and that year's eventual top three AFL draft picks in Andrew McGrath, Tim Taranto and Hugh McCluggage. He finished that break-out year by playing in an under-17s All-Star match as a curtain raiser to that year's AFL grand final.

Higgins had to that point attended high school at both De La Salle College and later Caulfield Grammar School, but left at the end of year 11 in 2016. Instead he focused on his football, committing to a rigorous weights program and extensive external sprints, skills and kicking coaching. In addition to boosting his fitness, the program also improved his kicking efficiency in his TAC Cup season from 72 per cent the previous year to 78 per cent in 2017. He also spent part of his draft year studying umpiring with AFL umpires development manager Adam Davis and worked part time at a local gym.

In the months leading into the 2017 junior season Higgins participated in the AFL's Academy program and traveled with the group on its high performance training camp trip to the United States of America. He also participated in the program's showcase game at the MCG in April, in which he starred with two goals, six tackles and 19 disposals. He was noted then as a potential number one overall draft pick and drew comparisons to Greater Western Sydney forward and AFL All-Australian Toby Greene.

Higgins returned to TAC Cup football with the Oakleigh Chargers that year and held averages of 24 disposals, six marks and five tackles per game to go along with 27 goals in 13 matches. His goal-kicking tally was seventh best in the competition. Perhaps his standout game came in round 17 of the competition, when he kicked seven goals in his side's 88-point victory over the Bendigo Pioneers. He continued to earn significant praise from AFL draft experts over this time, with ESPN's Christopher Doerre labelling him a likely top-10 pick Higgins ultimately won the Morrish Medal as the TAC Cup's best and fairest player on the back of his spectacular 2017 season, polling 22 votes across nine of his 13 games to become the first player in Oakleigh history to win the award. Despite taking out the league award he missed out on the Oakleigh best and fairest, placing second behind forward Toby Wooler.

At the national championships he again represented the Vic Metro region, playing four matches and averaging 27.3 disposals, six tackles and six marks along with a tally of six goals in the title-winning side. He was named the team's best and fairest player in addition to earning All-Australian selection at the tournament.

By the time he had finished his junior career, Higgins held the all-time record for average Champion Data ranking points per game (145 across 33 games in two years), beating Tom Rockliff's record set nine years earlier.

=== AFL recruitment ===
Higgins was invited to attend the national draft combine in Melbourne in October 2017. He placed second in the class for the kicking test, missing just one of an available 30 points.

Prior to the draft, Higgins was lauded for his football IQ, goal sense, his ability to win the ball in the forward half and his scoring ability, both as a midfielder and a forward. AFL Draft Central projected Higgins to be taken with a late first round pick, while AFL Media's Callum Twomey projected Higgins to be taken with the 11th overall pick in his draft day phantom draft.

=== Junior statistics ===
Legend
G	Goals	K	Kicks	D	Disposals	T	Tackles
B	Behinds	H	Handballs	M	Marks

TAC Cup

Season	Team	No.	Games	Totals							Averages (per game)						
Season	Team	No.	Games	G	B	K	H	D	M	T	G	B	K	H	D	M	T
2016	Oakleigh Chargers	35	7	14	—	83	69	152	35	21	2.0	—	11.9	9.9	21.7	5.0	3.0
2017	Oakleigh Chargers	35	14	31	—	199	123	322	75	71	2.2	—	14.2	8.8	23.0	5.4	5.1
Career			21	45	—	282	192	474	110	92	2.1	—	13.4	9.1	22.6	5.2	4.4

Under 18 National Championships

Season	Team	No.	Games	Totals							Averages (per game)						
Season	Team	No.	Games	G	B	K	H	D	M	T	G	B	K	H	D	M	T
2016	Vic Metro	2	2	1	—	25	16	41	8	1	0.5	—	12.5	8.0	20.5	4.0	0.5
2017	Vic Metro	2	4	6	—	53	56	109	24	25	1.5	—	13.3	14.0	27.3	6.0	6.3
Career			6	7	—	78	72	150	32	26	1.2	—	13.0	12.0	25.0	5.3	4.3

== AFL career ==
=== Richmond (2018–2020) ===
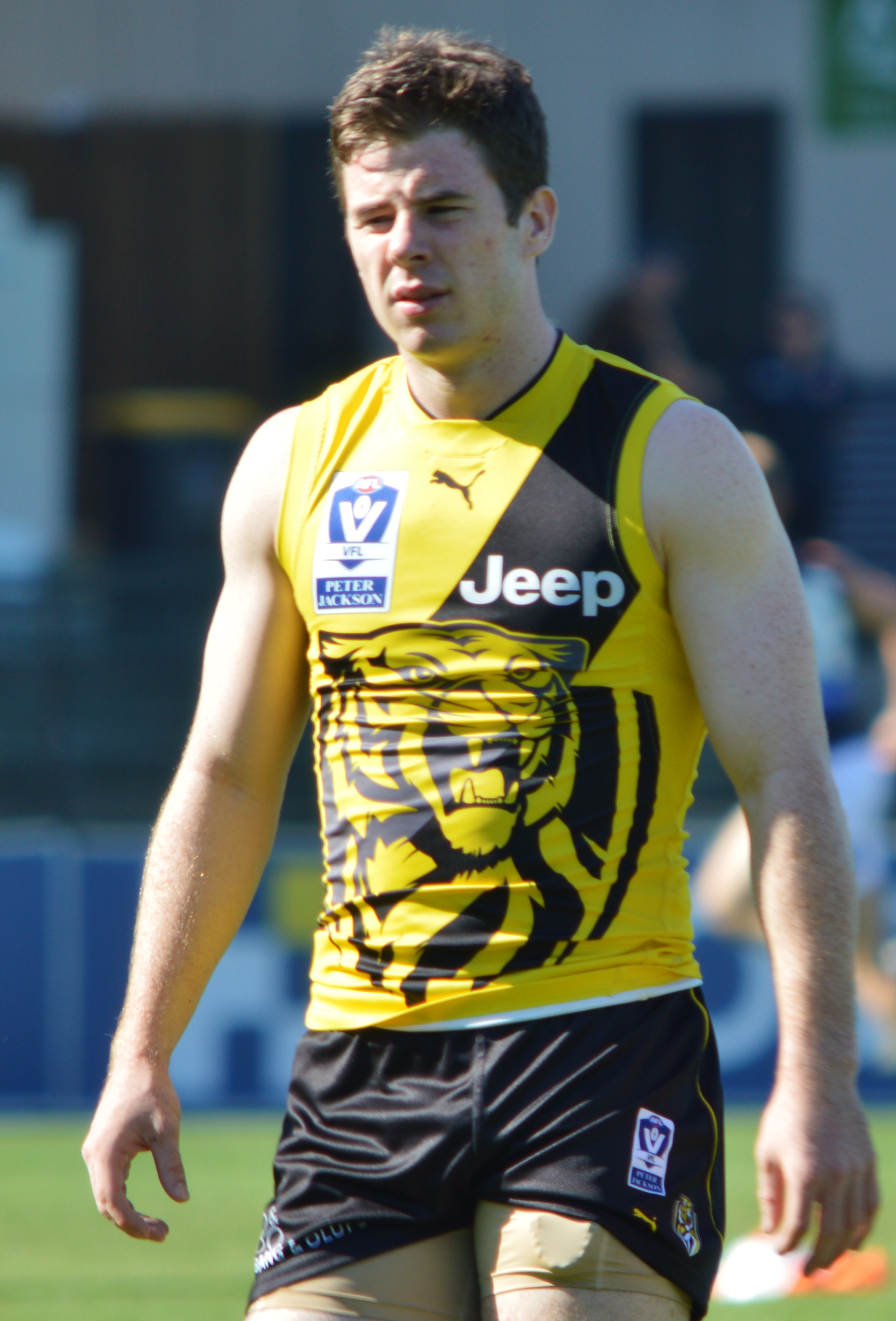
Higgins with Richmond's VFL team in March 2018

==== 2018 season ====
Higgins was drafted by Richmond with the club's first pick and the 17th selection overall, the last pick of the 1st round in the 2017 AFL national draft.

He demonstrated impressive running ability while training as a midfielder in his first AFL pre-season, before playing his first football in Richmond colours at the AFLX exhibition tournament in Sydney in February 2018. He also played limited minutes in the club's first official pre-season match, recording five disposals against Essendon in Wangaratta. He could not hold his spot into the final match of that series however, instead playing a practice match with the club's reserves side in the VFL. There he stayed through the first week of the AFL season, kicking two goals in a VFL practice match win over the Northern Blues. Higgins flew as a travelling emergency with the club's senior side to Adelaide the following week before playing another VFL practice match the next day, this time racking up 22 disposals, six marks, five tackles and a goal. Following that match, Higgins was selected to make his AFL debut against Hawthorn at the MCG in round 3. He kicked two goals in his debut, the first of which came from his first kick in league football and the second which earned him a nomination for the Goal of the Week. Despite this strong performance, Higgins was omitted from the round 4 side chosen to face the Brisbane Lions the following week, owing to the injury return of premiership players Dion Prestia and Josh Caddy. He sat out just one match, returning to AFL football with a team-high three goals in round 5's ANZAC Day eve match against Melbourne. He thus became the first Richmond player to kick multiple goals in the first two matches of their career since Justin Plapp did so in 1998. Higgins added another two goals in round 6, and played senior matches in each of the next two weeks before being a late withdrawal from the selected side in round 9. He played . Higgins spent just one week on the sidelines before returning in round 10, this time becoming the subject of major news story when he was disallowed a goal on a score-review that the AFL later admitted was incorrect. Head coach Damien Hardwick flagged an intent to give Higgins more midfield time after his round 15 performance in which he gathered 20 disposals in his side's victory over Sydney. He also earned praise from Richmond vice-captain Jack Riewoldt who praised Higgins' work off-ball, an area he said was often a weakness in first-year players. To that point he ranked second for total goal assists, third for score involvements per game, fourth for contested possessions per game and fifth for total tackles inside 50 among all Rising Star eligible players in the league that season. In round 16 he recorded a season-best 25 disposals in his side's victory over Adelaide and two weeks later he received a Rising Star nomination for an 18 disposal, four clearance and one goal contribution to his side's round 18 win over St Kilda. Higgins received another award nomination the following week, this time for Goal of the Year for a goal-line scissor kick against Collingwood which 3AW commentator Tim Lane referred to as “one of the greatest, most creative goals ever kicked in 120 years of (the sport).” The goal attracted significant controversy however, with some commentators and fans labeling it a throw as it required Higgins to elevate the ball into the air while his body travelled around the goal-line in the act of kicking. Umpiring officials later supported the on-field umpire's decision to award the goal as Higgins' action to put the ball into the air was deemed to come in the action of kicking. Higgins continued to earn selection at senior level into the finals series, where he recorded 20 disposals, eight score involvements and one goal in his side's qualifying final win over Hawthorn. He was named by AFL Media as one of Richmond's best players in the following match, a shock preliminary final loss to Collingwood in which he kicked two of his side's eight goals. At season's end Higgins was nominated for the AFL Players Association's Best First-Year Player, placed fourth in the AFL Rising Star and won Richmond's best first year player award. He also received the Goal of the Year award for his round 19 scissor-kick goal. Higgins finished 2018 having played 20 matches and ranked first for contested possessions, goal assists and score involvements per game across Rising Star eligible players that year.

==== 2019 season ====
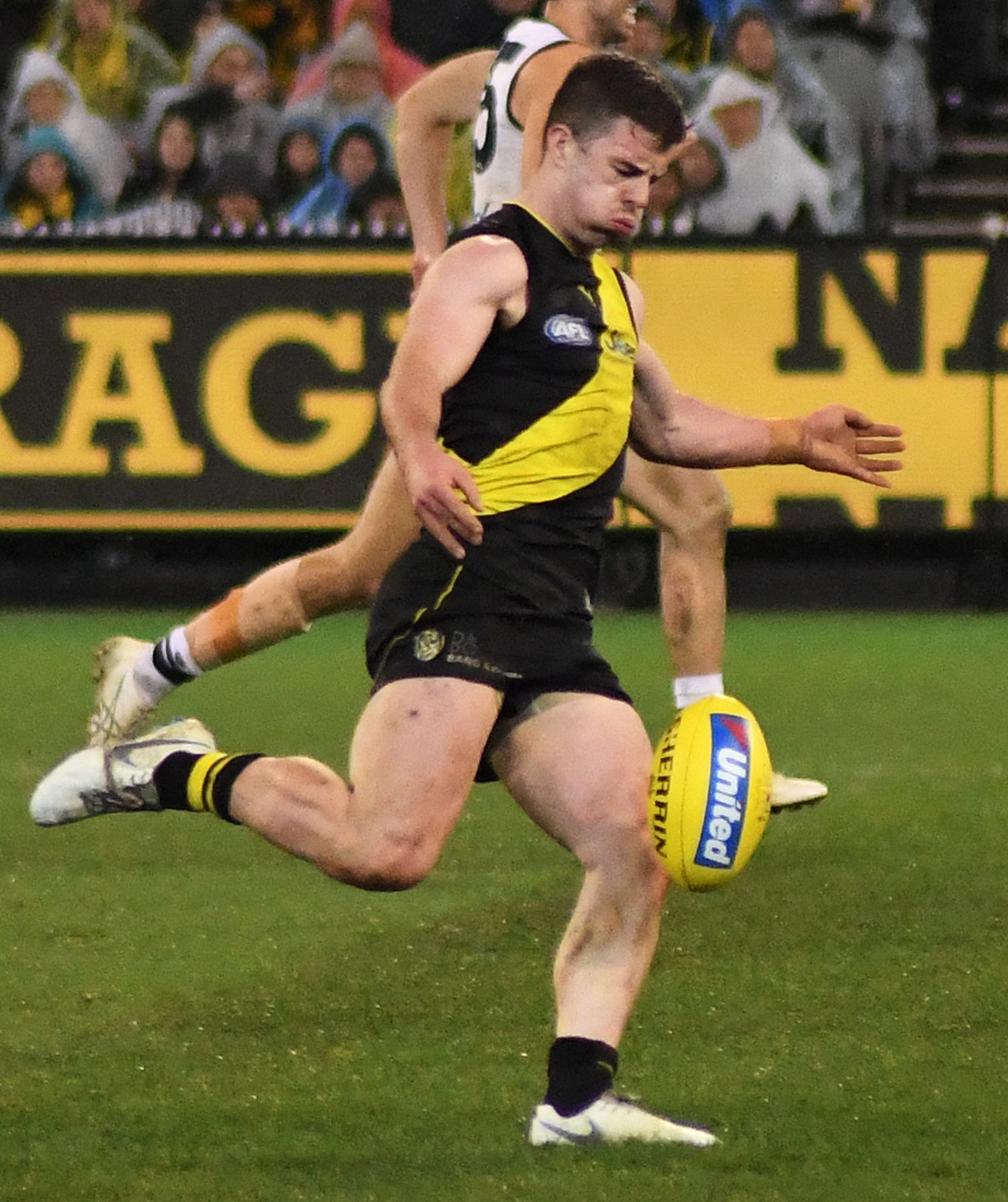
Higgins kicks during play in round 20, 2018

In the 2018/19 off-season, Higgins changed guernsey numbers to the number 13 and spent time training for a positional change to include more time as a midfielder. He began the year by being drafted to and playing for the Nat Fyfe captained Flyers team in the 2019 AFLX exhibition tournament in late February. Following that competition he played in each of Richmond's two official pre-season matches, where he averaged 20 disposals and two goals a game. In the opening round of the season-proper Higgins was impressive, earning a nomination for the league's Goal of the Week for a forward-pocket snap that was one of his three goals that night. That performance was strong enough to see him earn selection to AFL Media's Team of the Week. After kicking a total of three goals across his next two matches, Higgins was moved to a midfield role in round 4 following the loss of Trent Cotchin and Dustin Martin to injury and suspension respectively. While in the midfield he twice equaled his career-best with 25 disposals in back-to-back games in rounds 5 and 6. Higgins continued to play a hybrid forward-midfield role through the club's round 14 bye, but going goalless and failing to make a significant impact with an average of 13 disposals per game over the last three matches of that period. After the bye, and after 28 consecutive matches for Richmond at AFL level, Higgins was dropped from the club's round 14 side and forced to play reserves grade football in the VFL. He was lively at the level, playing more midfield minutes than he had in AFL matches and averaging 23 disposals and a goal a game over three matches.

He would fail to play again at any level that season however, when a series of severe headaches in mid July led to Higgins being admitted to hospital with a brain bleed. The condition was identified as a previously undiagnosed blood vessel weakness that would require surgery to repair but that could be corrected permanently and that place Higgins under no serious continuing health risk. In late July, he underwent a non-invasive surgery meant to correct the condition and allow for a return to football for the start of the 2020 season. A review of his condition one month later however, showed the need for a second, more extensive surgery in September. Estimates at that time suggested his basic recovery could take as long as six months and effectively rule him out from match play for most of the 2020 season. He was discharged from hospital in mid-September and participated in light jogging at the club in the week prior to the AFL grand final. Higgins played 13 AFL matches as well as three games at VFL level in 2019 and was one of just six players on the list to feature in neither the AFL nor VFL premierships that year.

==== 2020 season ====
Upon an all-clear diagnosis on his brain bleed, Higgins made a return to self-supervised training in the last week of October 2019 and a return to light duties at club training in December. Showing remarkable progress, Higgins participated in contact training in January 2020, and in match simulation in February. He made his return to match-play in the club's first pre-season game, contributing six disposals in limited minutes but missing out on selection for the second and final pre-season match. Instead, he kicked an equal team-high four goals in a VFL practice match in the first week March and was scheduled to play in another the following week that was eventually cancelled due to safety concerns as a result of the rapid progression of the coronavirus pandemic into Australia. Though the AFL season would start on schedule later that month, just one round of matches was played of the reduced 17-round season before the imposition of state border restrictions saw the season suspended for an indefinite hiatus. Higgins earned an AFL recall when the season resumed 11 weeks later, kicking one goal in an early-June draw with Collingwood. As with all matches that year, it was held with playing time reduced by one fifth, owing to the need for a condensed fixture with multiple games on short breaks later in the year. He held his spot over the next month, and was among Richmond's best in a round 4 loss to St Kilda after a performance that included 17 disposals, a goal and an equal game-high seven score involvements. He received six coaches votes as equal-second best on ground the following week, recording 19 disposals and a goal in a win over Melbourne. In early-July, Higgins moved with the main playing group when the club was relocated to the Gold Coast in response to a virus outbreak in Melbourne. Injuries to Dion Prestia and Trent Cotchin during the prior match and the personal-leave absence of Shane Edwards, afforded Higgins an opportunity to play in the midfield over coming weeks, including when he was named among Richmond's best by AFL Media in a round 7 win over North Melbourne. After a career-low six-disposal game in round 10, Higgins was omitted from the club's round 11 side, instead taking part in unofficial scratch matches against opposition reserves players in place of the cancelled VFL season. To that point he ranked fifth among Richmond players for total contested possessions that season, and fourth for inside-50s. A one-week injury to half-forward Kane Lambert saw Higgins return for a single AFL match in round 15, before being dropped again to reserves level the following week. He suffered a minor calf strain in a reserves match in late September, just one week before the club was to begin its AFL finals campaign. Higgins remained injured through the course of the finals series, unable to fight for selection as his teammates earned the club a successive AFL premiership.

That off-season, Higgins sought a trade away from Richmond despite being contracted until the end of 2021. Citing disappointment with missing out on AFL selection in the back half of the regular season, Higgins informed Richmond of his intention to explore contract offers with other clubs in late October according to multiple media reports. After club officials told media in early November that they remained hopeful of retaining him, Higgins formally requested a trade to St Kilda on 9 November. He had played 43 games over three seasons at Richmond.

=== St Kilda (2021–present) ===
On the final day of the 2020 trade period, Higgins was traded to St Kilda in a multi-part deal which principally involved Richmond gaining a future second round draft pick and moving four spots up in the first round of the 2020 draft.

Higgins made his St Kilda debut in Round One against the GWS Giants in Sydney, kicking two goals in the Saints' narrow win. In the Saints' Round Three loss to Essendon, Higgins was a rare shining light kicking three goals and collecting 17 disposals. Higgins continued to be a fair contributor for the Saints before kicking a career-high four goals from 18 disposals in an impressive display against the Hawks in Round Seven. In Round 12 against Sydney at the SCG, Higgins had a near best-on-ground performance with 23 disposals and 12 marks, but kicked a wayward 1.6, including missing two set shots at goal in the final quarter which would have likely seen the Saints secure victory had he converted. Higgins faced some intense media coverage as a result. At the time Higgins had kicked 17 goals for the year, one behind club leader Tim Membrey (18). Higgins collected 24 disposals the following week against Adelaide, but only managed two behinds. Higgins missed rounds 17–19 with back soreness, before returning in Round 20 against Carlton where he gathered 20 disposals and kicked a goal. Higgins gained redemption for his Round 12 performance with a 4-goal haul against Sydney in an upset win over the top-six side in Round 21. Higgins ultimately played 19 of a possible 22 games in his first season with the Saints, kicking a career-high 27 goals for the season, just 11 shy of 2021 leading goalkicker Max King (38).

In Round 4 of the 2023 AFL season Higgins kicked 5 goals and had 22 disposals in 53 point win against Gold Coast at Marvel Stadium.

== Player profile ==
Higgins plays primarily as a small forward and half-forward, and occasionally plays as an inside midfielder.

== Statistics ==
Updated to the end of round 22, 2026.

Legend
G	Goals	K	Kicks	D	Disposals	T	Tackles
B	Behinds	H	Handballs	M	Marks

Season	Team	No.	Games	Totals							Averages (per game)							Votes
Season	Team	No.	Games	G	B	K	H	D	M	T	G	B	K	H	D	M	T	Votes
2018	Richmond	28	20	15	14	150	174	324	56	49	0.8	0.7	7.5	8.7	16.2	2.8	2.5	0
2019	Richmond	13	13	9	4	120	97	217	39	39	0.7	0.3	9.2	7.5	16.7	3.0	3.0	0
2020 (Note: The 2020 season was played with 17 home-and-away matches per team (down from 22) and 16-minute quarters with time on (down from 20-minute quarters with time on) due to the impact of the COVID-19 pandemic.)	Richmond	13	10	5	7	90	56	146	36	17	0.5	0.7	9.0	5.6	14.6	3.6	1.7	0
2021	St Kilda	22	19	27	16	161	131	292	79	42	1.4	0.8	8.5	6.9	15.4	4.2	2.2	1
2022	St Kilda	22	18	30	25	147	72	219	68	21	1.7	1.4	8.2	4.0	12.2	3.8	1.2	7
2023	St Kilda	22	22	36	25	163	130	293	82	43	1.6	1.1	7.4	5.9	13.3	3.7	2.0	3
2024	St Kilda	1	20	36	20	132	111	243	59	50	1.8	1.0	6.6	5.6	12.2	3.0	2.5	1
2025	St Kilda	1	23	46	17	114	103	217	53	52	2.0	0.7	5.0	4.5	9.4	2.3	2.3	1
2026	St Kilda	1	16	29	21	98	68	166	39	29	1.8	1.3	6.1	4.3	10.4	2.4	1.8	0
Career			161	233	149	1175	942	2117	511	342	1.5	0.9	7.3	5.9	13.2	3.2	2.1	13

== Honours and achievements ==
Team

- McClelland Trophy (Richmond): 2018

Individual

- AFL Goal of the Year: 2018
- AFL Rising Star nominee: 2018
- Cosgrove–Jenkins Award (RFC Best First-Year Player): 2018
- 3× St Kilda leading goalkicker: 2023, 2024, 2025

Junior

- Morrish Medal: 2017
- Under 18 national championships premiership player: 2017
- Under 18 All-Australian: 2017
- Vic Metro best and fairest: 2017
- Under 16 national championships best & fairest: 2015
