= Jack Sinclair (footballer) =

Australian rules footballer (born 1995)

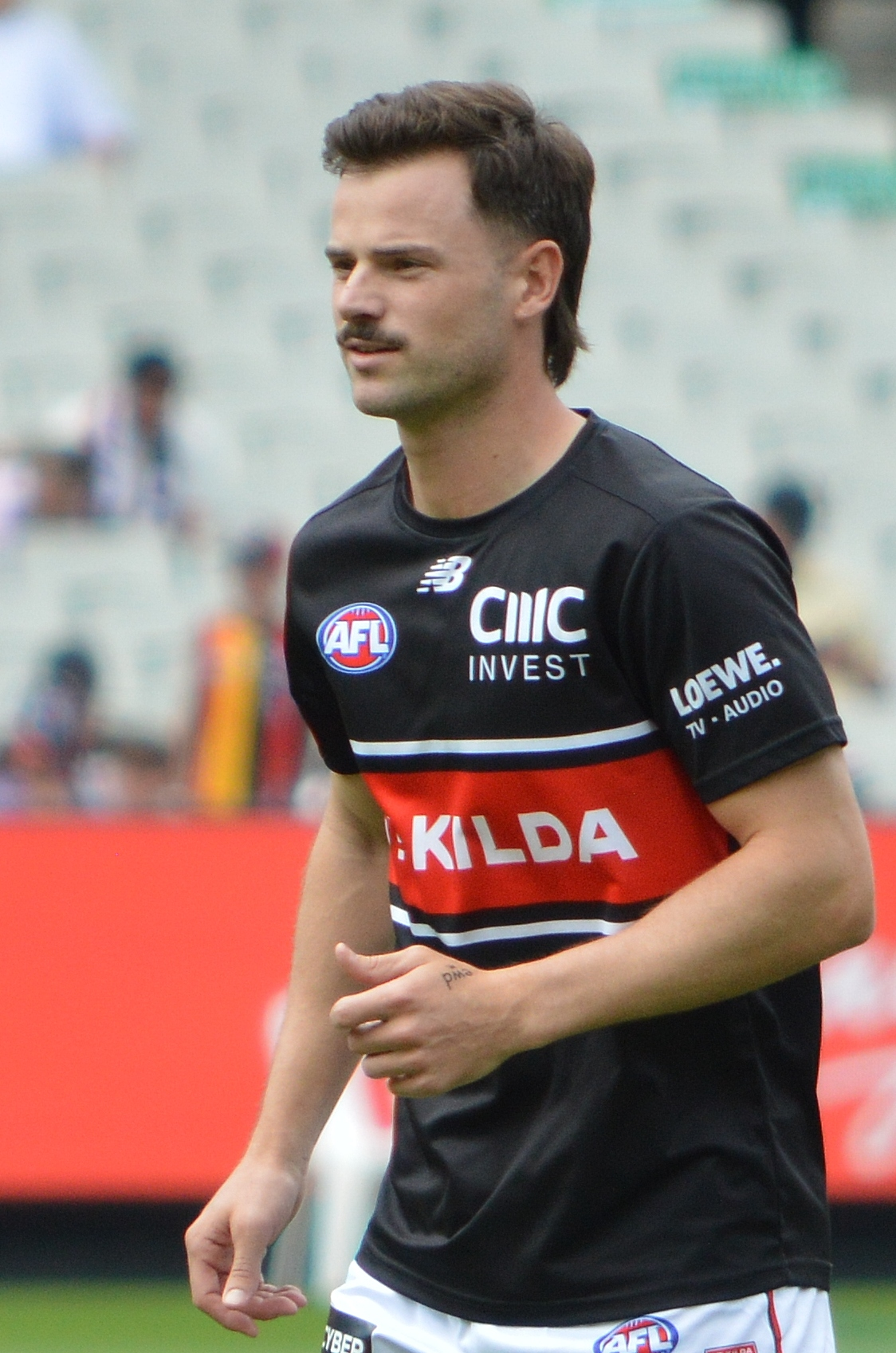
- Sinclair playing for St Kilda in March 2026

Personal information
- Full name: Jack Sinclair
- Born: 12 February 1995 (age 31)
- Original team: Oakleigh Chargers (TAC Cup)
- Draft: No. 1, 2015 Rookie Draft
- Height: 181 cm (5 ft 11 in)
- Weight: 80 kg (176 lb)
- Position: Defender

Club information
- Current club: St Kilda
- Number: 35

Playing career^{1}
Years	Club	Games (Goals)
2015–	St Kilda	225 (71)

Representative team honours
Years	Team	Games (Goals)
2026	Victoria	1 (0)
- ^{1} Playing statistics correct to the end of round 22, 2026.

Career highlights
- St Kilda co-captain: 2026–; 2x All-Australian team: 2022, 2023; 2x Trevor Barker Award: 2022, 2023; Silk-Miller Medal: 2026

Jack Sinclair (born 12 February 1995) is an Australian rules footballer who plays for and co-captains the St Kilda Football Club in the Australian Football League (AFL).

== Early life ==
Sinclair grew up supporting Carlton due to his father, but his maternal grandfather Bill Gleeson played for St Kilda, a team he would ultimately join in 2015. Sinclair attended Scotch College with future St Kilda teammate Jack Billings. He grew up in the Melbourne suburbs of Kew East and Balwyn.

Sinclair was overlooked in his draft year 2013. He then spent 2014 playing for the Oakleigh Chargers in the TAC Cup under 18 as an overage player and also played for Port Melbourne in the Victorian Football League (VFL) where he caught the eye of recruiters. Prior he played community football for Kew Comets in the Yarra Junior Football League, as well as school football for Scotch in the APS school sports competition.

== AFL career ==
He was drafted by St Kilda with the first pick in the 2014 Rookie Draft. In his first years at the club, Sinclair was mentored by Jack Newnes. Of the mentoring, Sinclair stated that "being able to work with him on a wing, I’ve learned a lot from him....It’s been great having him around, just with little things like sitting in on my reviews and trying to help me out. I really look up to him. I think he’s a really good player.” Sinclair made his AFL debut in Round 1 of the 2015 AFL season against Greater Western Sydney and played an impressive 18 games in his debut season. He would have also played finals in his debut year, however the Saints' missed the top eight on percentage only.

=== 2017-2019 ===
Sinclair was awarded Robert Harvey's number 35 ahead of the 2017 season, with Sinclair stating that “when they offered it to me I was more than happy to say yes. I watched a lot of the Sainters growing up and Robert Harvey was one of my favourite players to watch across the whole league”. Sinclair was left out of the Saints side for the first five matches of 2017, but returned to the side and did not miss another senior match for the season, playing as a wingman and half-forward. He averaged just under 21 disposals a game and had three games of 25 disposals or more.

Ahead of the 2018 season, Champion Data ranked Sinclair as one of the AFL's 55 'elite' footballers, with his inside game, his pressure and his scoreboard impact listed as he key traits. Sinclair went on to play 20 games that season, averaging just under 20 disposals a game.

Sinclair was one of seven Saints to play every game in 2019, predominantly playing on the wing and averaging 17 disposals and four tackles per game. He also was in the Saints' top three for metres gained.

=== 2020 ===
Sinclair started the season as an emergency for the first seven games of the season, squeezed out of new coach Brett Ratten's new side, particularly with the arrival of Bradley Hill, a three-time premiership wingman. Sinclair finally made his 2020 debut, collecting 15 disposals in the Saints' win over Port Adelaide. Sinclair then went on to play every game for the remainder of the season, including two finals, playing as a wingman, half-forward, and inside midfielder.

=== 2021 ===
After spending his career to date as an offensive player in the midfield or at half-forward, Sinclair was switched to the backline ahead of the 2021 season. In the pre-season game against Carlton, Sinclair had 28 disposals, 10 score involvements, eight intercepts, seven inside-50s. While he had never played in the backline in his career, Sinclair cemented his role from that moment and the switch proved a masterstroke for both the Saints and Sinclair, with the latter ultimately having his career-best season. Sinclair notched up his 100th AFL game in Round Two, where he was ceremoniously handed his guernsey pre-game by Tony Lockett. One of Sinclair's best games came in the 69-point Round Seven win over Hawthorn, where he had 26 disposals, five rebound-50s, four inside-50s and a goal. He also earned six AFL Coaches’ Association votes for that performance. He also had an influential game against Sydney in Round 12 where he had 29 disposals, 11 contested possessions and six rebounds. At the midway point of the season, Sinclair was First for St Kilda's intercepts (99), second for goal assists (eight), third for rebound-50s (46), contested possessions (99), defensive-half pressure acts (123), ground-ball gets (75). For his outstanding season, Sinclair was nominated by his teammates for the AFL Players' Association Most Valuable Player Award (each team puts forward three player nominations to the AFLPA). Sinclair also finished second in the Trevor Barker Award, collecting 155 votes as well as the Robert Harvey Best Clubman Award.

=== 2023 ===
Sinclair backed up his excellent 2022 season in 2023 with a second All-Australian selection and a second best and fairest.

== Statistics ==
Updated to the end of round 22, 2026.

Legend
G	Goals	K	Kicks	D	Disposals	T	Tackles
B	Behinds	H	Handballs	M	Marks
†	Led the league for the season

Season	Team	No.	Games	Totals							Averages (per game)							Votes
Season	Team	No.	Games	G	B	K	H	D	M	T	G	B	K	H	D	M	T	Votes
2015	St Kilda	40	18	18	7	89	105	194	40	45	1.0	0.4	4.9	5.8	10.8	2.2	2.5	0
2016	St Kilda	40	9	4	4	51	62	113	31	24	0.4	0.4	5.7	6.9	12.6	3.4	2.7	0
2017	St Kilda	35	17	8	8	168	185	353	63	56	0.5	0.5	9.9	10.9	20.8	3.7	3.3	0
2018	St Kilda	35	20	6	9	185	210	395	70	71	0.3	0.5	9.3	10.5	19.8	3.5	3.6	0
2019	St Kilda	35	22	4	11	204	165	369	62	77	0.2	0.5	9.3	7.5	16.8	2.8	3.5	0
2020 (Note: The 2020 season was played with 17 home-and-away matches per team (down from 22) and 16-minute quarters with time on (down from 20-minute quarters with time on) due to the impact of the COVID-19 pandemic.)	St Kilda	35	12	0	1	98	73	171	29	31	0.0	0.1	8.2	6.1	14.3	2.4	2.6	0
2021	St Kilda	35	21	3	2	281	162	443	102	48	0.1	0.1	13.4	7.7	21.1	4.9	2.3	0
2022	St Kilda	35	22	4	2	428^{†}	181	609	127	55	0.2	0.1	19.5	8.2	27.7	5.8	2.5	9
2023	St Kilda	35	24	6	3	470	223	693	119	49	0.3	0.1	19.6	9.3	28.9	5.0	2.0	21
2024	St Kilda	35	22	7	4	394	202	596	117	65	0.3	0.2	17.9	9.2	27.1	5.3	3.0	11
2025	St Kilda	35	23	9	6	447	173	620	110	61	0.4	0.3	19.4	7.5	27.0	4.8	2.7	7
2026	St Kilda	35	15	2	2	286	121	407	94	24	0.1	0.1	19.1	8.1	27.1	6.3	1.6	0
Career			225	71	59	3101	1862	4963	964	606	0.3	0.3	13.8	8.3	22.1	4.3	2.7	48

== Honours and achievements ==
Individual

- All-Australian team: 2022, 2023
