= Max Hall (Australian footballer) =

Australian rules football player

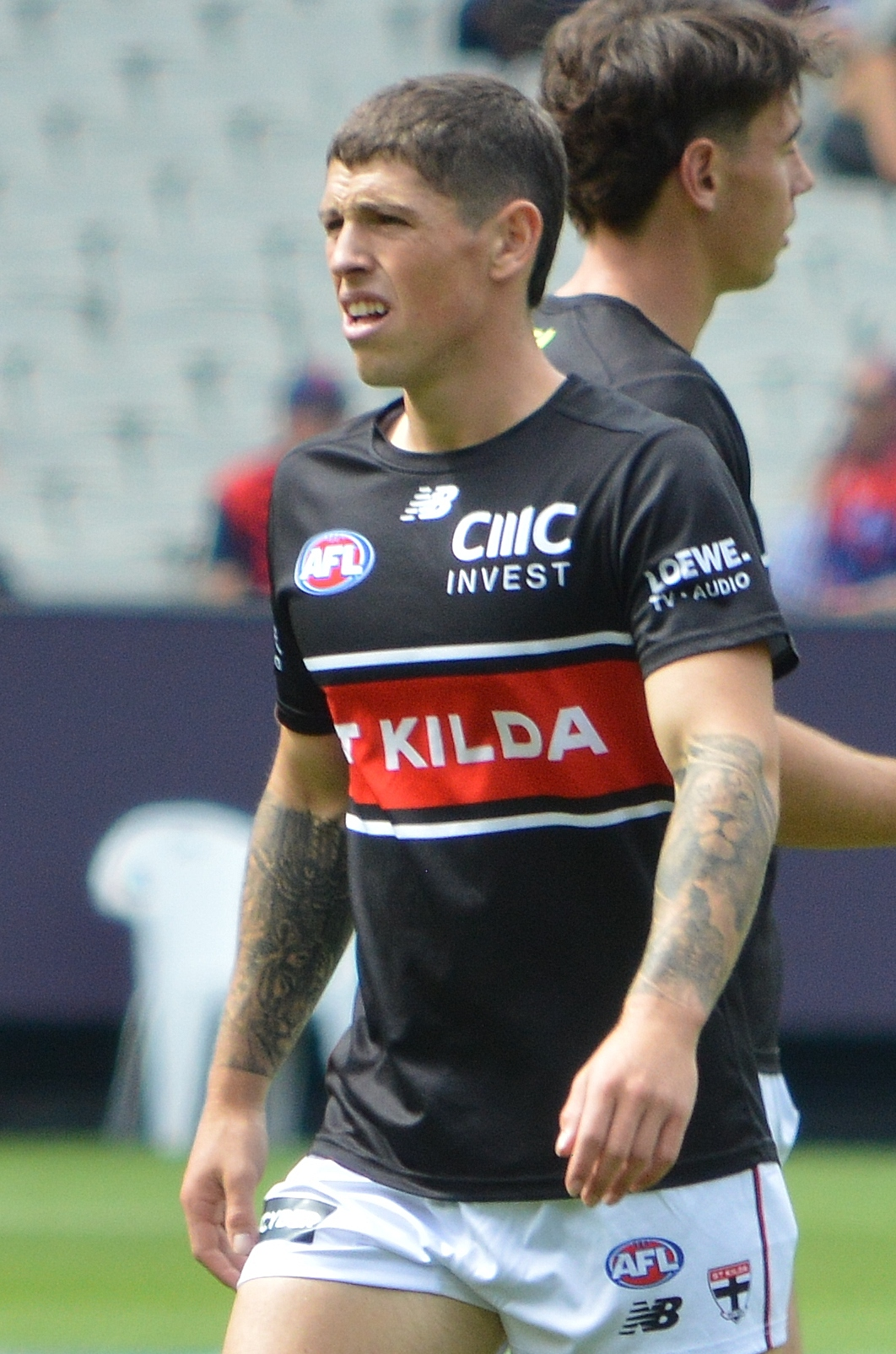
- Hall in March 2026

Personal information
- Full name: Max Hall
- Born: 15 April 2002 (age 24)
- Original team: Box Hill Hawks (VFL)
- Draft: No. 4, 2024 mid-season rookie draft
- Debut: Round 1, 2025, St Kilda vs. Adelaide, at Adelaide Oval
- Height: 183 cm (6 ft 0 in)
- Weight: 83 kg (183 lb)
- Position: Midfielder

Club information
- Current club: St Kilda
- Number: 40

Playing career^{1}
Years	Club	Games (Goals)
2024–	St Kilda	46 (49)
- ^{1} Playing statistics correct to the end of the 2026 season.

Career highlights
- AFLCA Best Emerging Player: 2026

Max Hall (born 15 April 2002) is a professional Australian rules footballer playing for St Kilda in the Australian Football League (AFL).

== Early career ==
Hall played junior football at the Montrose Football Club and the Eastern Ranges before moving onto Box Hill Hawks in the Victorian Football League (VFL). A midfielder or half-forward, Hall has good speed and endurance. He suffered from two Anterior cruciate ligament injuries at age 15 and 16. His family run a cattle farm in Yea, where he was working on the day he was drafted.

== AFL career ==
Hall was the fourth player picked in the 2024 mid-season draft. Hall made his AFL debut in round 1 2025 against Adelaide at Adelaide Oval, kicking two goals on debut. Hall's impressive debut season in which he played every game and kicked 23 goals was rewarded with a two-year contract extension, a fourth-place finish in St Kilda's Best & Fairest award the Trevor Barker Award and the club's Best Emerging Player award.

== Statistics ==
Updated to the end of the 2026 season.

Legend
G	Goals	K	Kicks	D	Disposals	T	Tackles
B	Behinds	H	Handballs	M	Marks

Season	Team	No.	Games	Totals							Averages (per game)							Votes
Season	Team	No.	Games	G	B	K	H	D	M	T	G	B	K	H	D	M	T	Votes
2025	St Kilda	40	23	23	16	180	171	351	72	69	1.0	0.7	7.8	7.4	15.3	3.1	3.0	1
2026	St Kilda	40	23	26	20	263	271	534	106	87	1.1	0.9	11.4	11.8	23.2	4.6	3.8	0
Career			46	49	36	443	442	885	178	156	1.1	0.8	9.6	9.6	19.2	3.9	3.4	1
