= Lance Collard =

Australian rules footballer (born 2005)

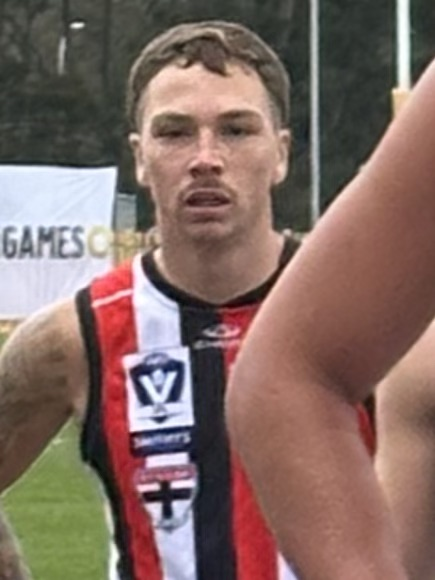
- Collard in July 2026

Personal information
- Born: 26 March 2005 (age 21)
- Original teams: Subiaco (WAFL); North Beach JFC
- Draft: No. 28, 2023 AFL draft
- Debut: 16 March 2024, St Kilda vs. Geelong, at Kardinia Park
- Height: 185 cm (6 ft 1 in)
- Weight: 70 kg (154 lb)
- Position: Forward

Club information
- Current club: St Kilda
- Number: 4

Playing career^{1}
Years	Club	Games (Goals)
2024–	St Kilda	15 (8)
- ^{1} Playing statistics correct to the end of the 2025 season.

Lance Collard (born 26 March 2005) is an Australian rules footballer who plays for the St Kilda Football Club in the Australian Football League (AFL).

== Early life ==
Originally from Perth, Western Australia, Collard played his junior football with North Beach JFC and represented Subiaco in the Western Australian Football League (WAFL).

Collard was picked by St Kilda with pick 28 of the 2023 national draft. He was part of West Coast Eagles' Next Generation Academy and was tied to the Eagles who could have matched any draft bid if he had been taken later than pick 40.

He is of Noongar and Yamatji descent.

== AFL career ==
Collard made his debut against Geelong in round 1 of the 2024 season, coming on as the substitute.

In July 2024, Collard was suspended for six matches after using homophobic slurs against multiple Williamstown opponents while playing in the Victorian Football League (VFL) for St Kilda's affiliate Sandringham.

Collard was suspended by the AFL Tribunal for nine weeks, with two weeks suspended, in April 2026 for again using a homophobic slur against another VFL player. During the tribunal hearing, St Kilda's legal representative said that the AFL's proposed ten week suspension could be "career-ending" for Collard. Collard denied having used the slur during the hearing, and St Kilda appealed the decision. The AFL Appeals Board found that Collard had used a homophobic slur, but reduced the penalty to a four week suspension (two weeks of which were suspended). The head of the AFL Appeals Board was sacked in relation to this decision, including the board's reasoning that "racist, sexist or homophobic" language is "commonplace" in professional AFL.

== Statistics ==
Updated to the end of the 2025 season.

Legend
G	Goals	K	Kicks	D	Disposals	T	Tackles
B	Behinds	H	Handballs	M	Marks

Season	Team	No.	Games	Totals							Averages (per game)							Votes
Season	Team	No.	Games	G	B	K	H	D	M	T	G	B	K	H	D	M	T	Votes
2024	St Kilda	4	3	0	0	5	2	7	2	1	0.0	0.0	1.7	0.7	2.3	0.7	0.3	0
2025	St Kilda	4	12	8	6	39	26	65	13	20	0.7	0.5	3.3	2.2	5.4	1.1	1.7	0
2026	St Kilda	4	0	—	—	—	—	—	—	—	—	—	—	—	—	—	—	
Career			15	8	6	44	28	72	15	21	0.5	0.4	2.9	1.9	4.8	1.0	1.4	0
