= Ryan Byrnes =

Australian rules footballer (born 2001)

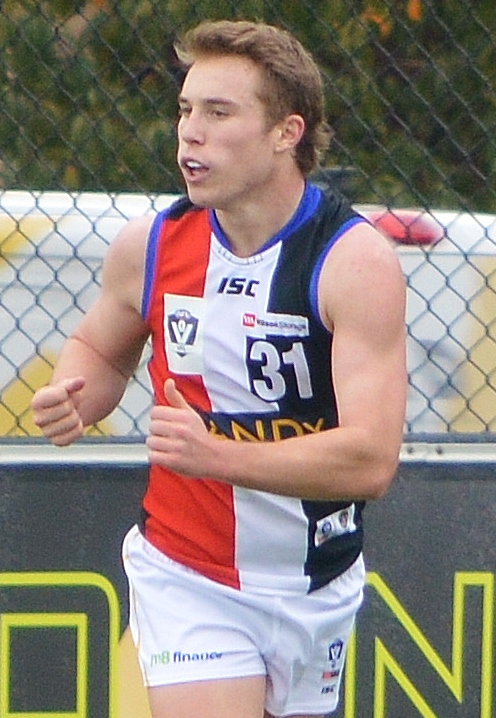
- Byrnes with St Kilda's VFL-affiliate side Sandringham in April 2021

Personal information
- Full name: Ryan Byrnes
- Born: 3 May 2001 (age 25); Manly, New South Wales
- Original team: Sandringham Dragons (NAB League)
- Draft: No. 52, 2019 national draft
- Debut: 20 July 2020, St Kilda vs. Adelaide, at Adelaide Oval
- Height: 181 cm (5 ft 11 in)
- Weight: 84 kg (185 lb)
- Position: Midfielder

Club information
- Current club: St Kilda
- Number: 13

Playing career^{1}
Years	Club	Games (Goals)
2020–	St Kilda	93 (17)
- ^{1} Playing statistics correct to the end of round 22, 2026.

Ryan Byrnes (born 3 May 2001) is an Australian rules footballer playing for the St Kilda Football Club in the Australian Football League (AFL). He was recruited by St Kilda with the 52nd pick in the 2019 AFL draft.

== Early football ==
Byrnes played junior football for his local club, St Paul's McKinnon JFC. He also played football for his school side at St Bede's College, where he was a part of their premiership team in the Associated Catholic Colleges division. Byrnes played a part in getting his school their first Herald Sun Shield win. He also played for the Sandringham Dragons in the NAB League for the 2018 and 2019 seasons, and was named captain for the latter. He also won the Dragons' best and fairest award in 2019. Over the 2 seasons he played for the club, he kicked 6 goals and participated in 27 matches. He was 3rd in the Best & Fairest 2018 for his bottom age year at Sandringham Dragons and won the Best & Fairest in his senior year up for the Sandringham Dragons. Byrnes represented Vic Metro in the AFL Under 18 Championships for the 2019 season.

== AFL career ==
Byrnes debuted in the Saints' 23 point victory over the Adelaide Crows in the 7th round of the 2020 AFL season, becoming the 1616th player to represent St Kilda. On debut, Byrnes picked up 5 disposals and 2 tackles. He signed a one-year contract extension with St Kilda on 7 February 2021, keeping him at the club until at least 2022. Byrnes suffered a hamstring injury at training in the preseason of the 2021 AFL season, which saw him miss the first four games of the season. Byrnes was called up to the senior side in round seven for just his second AFL game and collected 18 disposals and nine marks. Byrnes maintained his spot into round eight where he had 16 disposals and five marks. Byrnes had a career-high 24 disposals and 12 marks in the Round 10 loss to the Western Bulldogs. He was also impressive against top four side Brisbane in Round 17, collecting 15 disposals, had seven score involvements and kicked two goals in the Saints' upset win. Byrnes ultimately played every game from round seven to 23 (he was a used medical sub for round 23), completing 16 of a possible 22 games for the season. Byrnes was predominantly used as a half forward, winger or inside midfielder in 2021.

== Statistics ==
Updated to the end of round 22, 2026.

Legend
G	Goals	K	Kicks	D	Disposals	T	Tackles
B	Behinds	H	Handballs	M	Marks

Season	Team	No.	Games	Totals							Averages (per game)							Votes
Season	Team	No.	Games	G	B	K	H	D	M	T	G	B	K	H	D	M	T	Votes
2020 (Note: The 2020 season was played with 17 home-and-away matches per team (down from 22) and 16-minute quarters with time on (down from 20-minute quarters with time on) due to the impact of the COVID-19 pandemic.)	St Kilda	31	1	0	0	2	3	5	0	2	0.0	0.0	2.0	3.0	5.0	0.0	2.0	0
2021	St Kilda	31	16	6	1	131	116	247	76	29	0.4	0.1	8.2	7.3	15.4	4.8	1.8	0
2022	St Kilda	13	11	0	1	51	37	88	25	10	0.0	0.1	4.6	3.4	8.0	2.3	0.9	0
2023	St Kilda	13	20	5	4	184	151	335	68	42	0.3	0.2	9.2	7.6	16.8	3.4	2.1	0
2024	St Kilda	13	15	1	0	160	84	244	69	35	0.1	0.0	10.7	5.6	16.3	4.6	2.3	0
2025	St Kilda	13	17	3	2	172	114	286	90	28	0.2	0.1	10.1	6.7	16.8	5.3	1.6	0
2026	St Kilda	13	13	2	3	119	103	222	53	22	0.2	0.2	9.2	7.9	17.1	4.1	1.7	0
Career			93	17	11	819	608	1427	381	168	0.2	0.1	8.8	6.5	15.3	4.1	1.8	0
