= Marcus Windhager =

Australian rules footballer (born 2003)

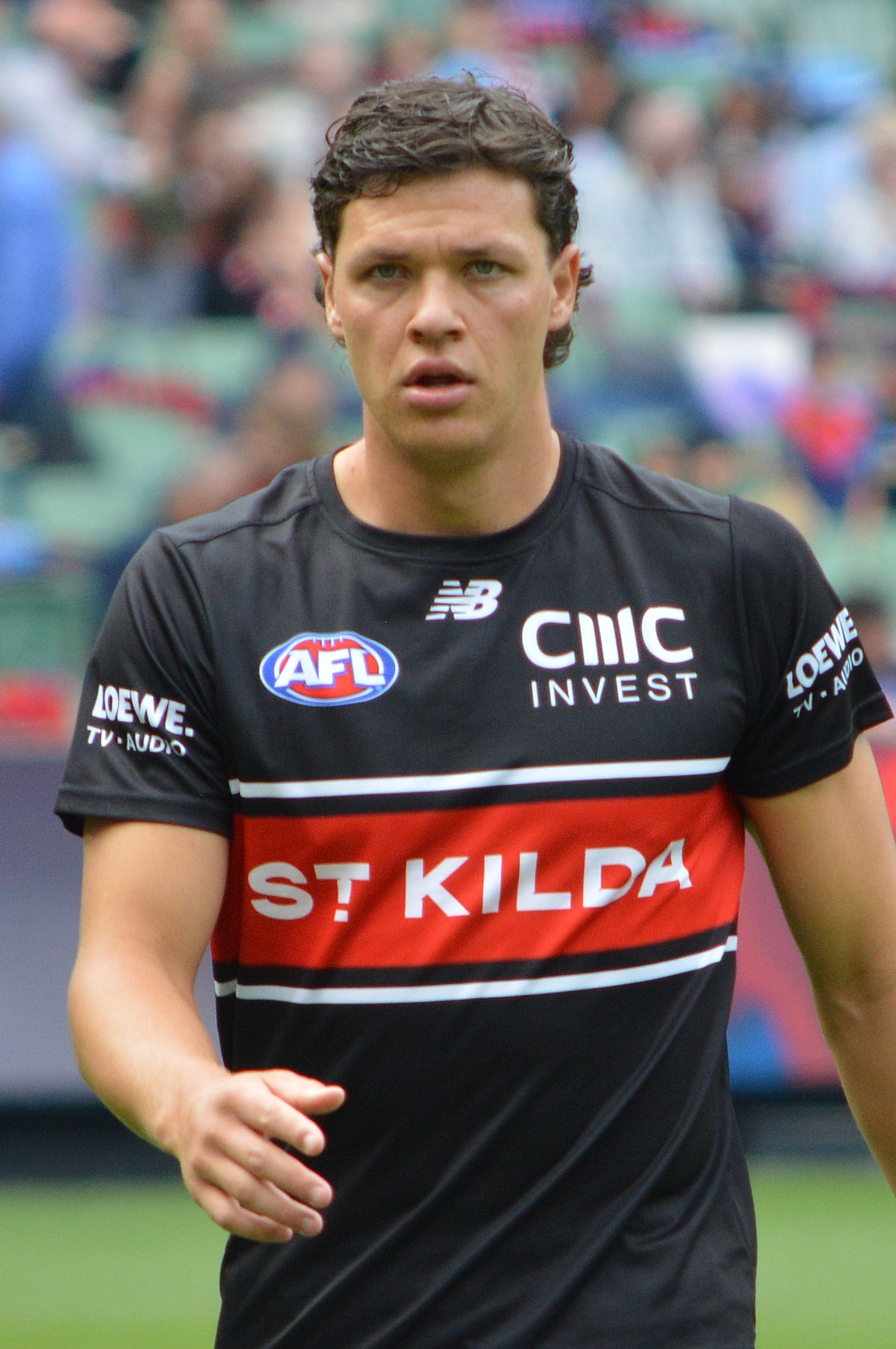
- Windhager in March 2026

Personal information
- Full name: Marcus Anthony Windhager
- Nickname: Windy
- Born: 16 May 2003 (age 23); Melbourne
- Original team: Sandringham Dragons (NAB League)/Beaumaris
- Draft: No. 47, 2021 AFL Draft
- Debut: 10 April 2022, Round 4, St Kilda vs. Hawthorn, at MCG
- Height: 185 cm (6 ft 1 in)
- Weight: 84 kg (185 lb)
- Position: Midfielder / defender

Club information
- Current club: St Kilda
- Number: 2

Playing career^{1}
Years	Club	Games (Goals)
2022–	St Kilda	96 (13)
- ^{1} Playing statistics correct to the end of round 22, 2026.

Career highlights
- AFL Rising Star nominee: 2022

Marcus Anthony Windhager (born 16 May 2003) is a professional Australian rules footballer playing for the St Kilda Football Club in the Australian Football League (AFL). He was drafted in the 2021 AFL Draft at pick number 47 overall.

== Early life ==
Windhager was a promising basketballer as a junior, and at 15, represented Australia in the 2018 FIBA Under-15 Oceania Basketball Championships, averaging 9.2 points, 3.7 rebounds and 3.2 assists across the tournament collecting a gold medal in their final against New Zealand.

As a junior footballer, Windhager was the SMJFL 2019 Under 16's Division one Best & Fairest winner and second in the goalkicking table with 23 majors from 10 games playing for Beaumaris, including a bag of 11 against Bentleigh.

Windhager was a member of St Kilda's Next Generation Academy, a pathway for indigenous and multicultural footballers who are typically under-represented and clubs incentivised with draft concessions. He was also an AMC Next Generation Academy Indigenous Scholarship holder.

Windhager was selected for Vic Metro in the 2021 Under 19 National Carnival and played an impressive 25-disposal game in a trail match against Vic Country. He then kicked a goal and had 12 disposals and three inside-50s in the U19 Championships game at Windy Hill in July. Windhager was tipped to be a top 30 pick at the 2021 draft, but suffered a back injury late in the year. Windhager also played for the Sandringham Dragons.

== AFL career ==
At the 2021 AFL draft, St Kilda matched a bid by Geelong with draft points for Windhager, and ultimately took him with pick 47 overall. Windhager made his AFL debut in 2022 in Round 4 against Hawthorn. In Round 8 Windhager kicked his first ever AFL goal in their loss to Melbourne at the Melbourne Cricket Ground. In the later half of 2022, Windhager was used as a tagger on players such as Tim Kelly and Cameron Guthrie, and in round 22 received a Rising Star nomination for keeping Brisbane player and Brownlow medallist Lachie Neale to 16 disposals, while collecting 21 touches himself.

== Statistics ==
Updated to the end of round 22, 2026.

Legend
G	Goals	K	Kicks	D	Disposals	T	Tackles
B	Behinds	H	Handballs	M	Marks

Season	Team	No.	Games	Totals							Averages (per game)							Votes
Season	Team	No.	Games	G	B	K	H	D	M	T	G	B	K	H	D	M	T	Votes
2022	St Kilda	17	18	4	4	118	95	213	52	39	0.2	0.2	6.6	5.3	11.8	2.9	2.2	0
2023	St Kilda	17	19	2	5	156	148	304	74	48	0.1	0.3	8.2	7.8	16.0	3.9	2.5	0
2024	St Kilda	2	15	0	2	135	136	271	36	77	0.0	0.1	9.0	9.1	18.1	2.4	5.1	1
2025	St Kilda	2	23	4	3	280	228	508	99	77	0.2	0.1	12.2	9.9	22.1	4.3	3.3	5
2026	St Kilda	2	21	3	2	278	202	480	97	56	0.1	0.1	13.2	9.6	22.9	4.6	2.7	0
Career			96	13	16	967	809	1776	358	297	0.1	0.2	10.1	8.4	18.5	3.7	3.1	6
