= Hugh Boxshall =

Personal information
- Born: 11 July 2006 (age 20)
- Original teams: Claremont; Swanbourne Tigers; Scotch College, Perth
- Draft: No. 45, 2024 AFL draft
- Debut: 2 May 2025, St Kilda vs. Fremantle, at Marvel Stadium
- Height: 188 cm (6 ft 2 in)
- Position: Midfielder

Club information
- Current club: St Kilda
- Number: 38

Playing career^{1}
Years	Club	Games (Goals)
2025–	St Kilda	21 (6)
- ^{1} Playing statistics correct to the end of the 2026 season.

Career highlights
- AFL Rising Star nominee: 2025

Hugh Boxshall is an Australian rules footballer who plays for the St Kilda Football Club in the Australian Football League (AFL).

Boxshall was taken by St Kilda with pick 45 of the 2024 AFL draft, after the club traded up the draft order to pick him. He made his debut against Fremantle in a 61-point win in round 8, impressing with 16 disposals and 10 contested possessions.

Boxshall extended his initial 2-year contract by another 2 years until the end of 2028.

In round 22 of the 2025 AFL season Boxshall had 14 disposals and 8 tackles against Richmond, which earnt him a nomination for the 2025 AFL rising star award.

== Statistics ==
Updated to the end of round 22, 2026.

Legend
G	Goals	K	Kicks	D	Disposals	T	Tackles
B	Behinds	H	Handballs	M	Marks

Season	Team	No.	Games	Totals							Averages (per game)							Votes
Season	Team	No.	Games	G	B	K	H	D	M	T	G	B	K	H	D	M	T	Votes
2025	St Kilda	38	11	2	2	60	79	139	35	43	0.2	0.2	5.5	7.2	12.6	3.2	3.9	0
2026	St Kilda	38	8	1	3	49	54	103	22	36	0.1	0.4	6.1	6.8	12.9	2.8	4.5	0
Career			19	3	5	109	133	242	57	79	0.2	0.3	5.7	7.0	12.7	3.0	4.2	0
