= Anthony Caminiti =

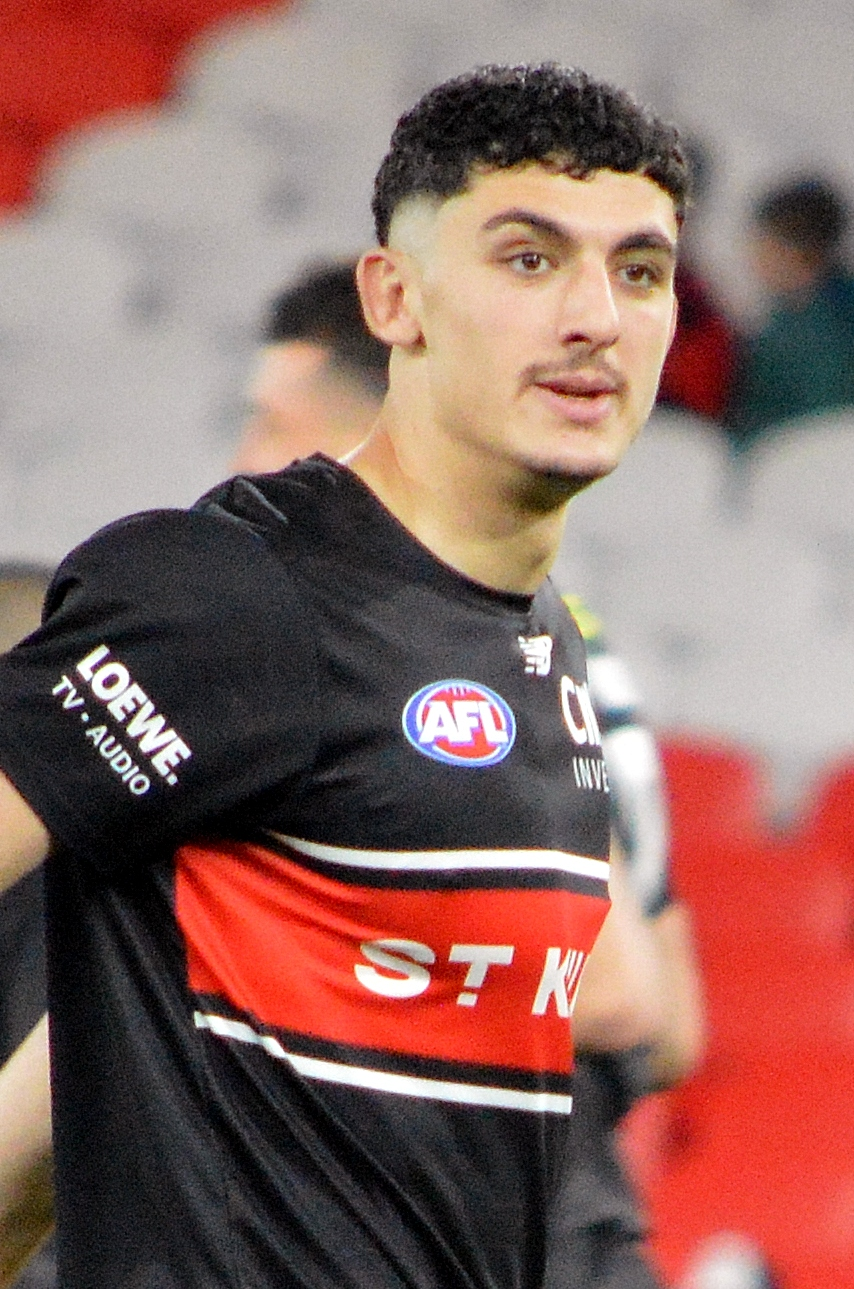
- Caminiti in August 2026

Personal information
- Born: 9 December 2003 (age 22)
- Original team: Heidelberg/Northern Knights/Carlton (VFL)
- Draft: 2023 pre-season supplemental selection period
- Debut: Round 1, St Kilda vs. Fremantle, at Marvel Stadium
- Height: 196 cm (6 ft 5 in)
- Position: Key Defender

Club information
- Current club: St Kilda
- Number: 47

Playing career^{1}
Years	Club	Games (Goals)
2023–	St Kilda	74 (46)
- ^{1} Playing statistics correct to the end of round 22, 2026.

Anthony Caminiti (born 9 December 2003) is an Australian rules footballer who plays for the St Kilda Football Club in the Australian Football League (AFL).

== Junior career ==
Caminiti played for the Northern Knights in the Talent League, averaging 9.5 disposals and 1.5 goals a game in 2022.

== AFL career ==
Caminiti signed with Carlton in the VFL after going undrafted, but was given the opportunity to train for a list spot with St Kilda during the supplemental selection period. He ultimately was added to St Kilda's list, and made his debut in round 1 of the 2023 AFL season.

== Statistics ==
Updated to the end of round 22, 2026.

Legend
G	Goals	K	Kicks	D	Disposals	T	Tackles
B	Behinds	H	Handballs	M	Marks

Season	Team	No.	Games	Totals							Averages (per game)							Votes
Season	Team	No.	Games	G	B	K	H	D	M	T	G	B	K	H	D	M	T	Votes
2023	St Kilda	47	18	19	9	78	74	152	60	50	1.1	0.5	4.3	4.1	8.4	3.3	2.8	0
2024	St Kilda	47	15	15	10	67	66	133	50	34	1.0	0.7	4.5	4.4	8.9	3.3	2.3	0
2025	St Kilda	47	23	4	1	174	104	278	131	35	0.2	0.0	7.6	4.5	12.1	5.7	1.5	0
2026	St Kilda	47	18	8	7	70	68	138	41	33	0.4	0.4	3.9	3.8	7.7	2.3	1.8	0
Career			74	46	27	389	312	701	282	152	0.6	0.4	5.3	4.2	9.5	3.8	2.1	0
