= Angus Hastie =

Australian rules footballer (born 2005)

Personal information
- Full name: Angus Hastie
- Born: 19 September 2005 (age 21)
- Original team: Geelong Falcons
- Draft: No. 33, 2023 AFL draft
- Debut: 30 March 2024, St Kilda vs. Essendon, at Docklands Stadium
- Height: 190 cm (6 ft 3 in)
- Weight: 74 kg (163 lb)
- Position: Defender

Club information
- Current club: St Kilda
- Number: 24

Playing career^{1}
Years	Club	Games (Goals)
2024–	St Kilda	19 (1)
- ^{1} Playing statistics correct to the end of round 22, 2026.

Angus Hastie (born 19 September 2005) is an Australian rules footballer who plays for the St Kilda Football Club in the Australian Football League (AFL).

Hastie had played for the Geelong West Giants and Geelong Falcons at junior level and represented Vic Country at the 2023 National Under 18 Championships. He was selected by St Kilda with pick 33 of the 2023 National Draft. He made his debut against Essendon, coming on as the substitute for the last quarter.

== Statistics ==
Updated to the end of round 22, 2026.

Legend
G	Goals	K	Kicks	D	Disposals	T	Tackles
B	Behinds	H	Handballs	M	Marks

Season	Team	No.	Games	Totals							Averages (per game)							Votes
Season	Team	No.	Games	G	B	K	H	D	M	T	G	B	K	H	D	M	T	Votes
2024	St Kilda	24	5	1	0	12	13	25	6	3	0.2	0.0	2.4	2.6	5.0	1.2	0.6	0
2025	St Kilda	24	9	0	2	50	31	81	25	15	0.0	0.2	5.6	3.4	9.0	2.8	1.7	0
2026	St Kilda	24	5	0	0	39	16	55	17	13	0.0	0.0	7.8	3.2	11.0	3.4	2.6	0
Career			19	1	2	101	60	161	48	31	0.1	0.1	5.3	3.2	8.5	2.5	1.6	0
