= Alix Tauru =

Australian rules footballer (born 2006)

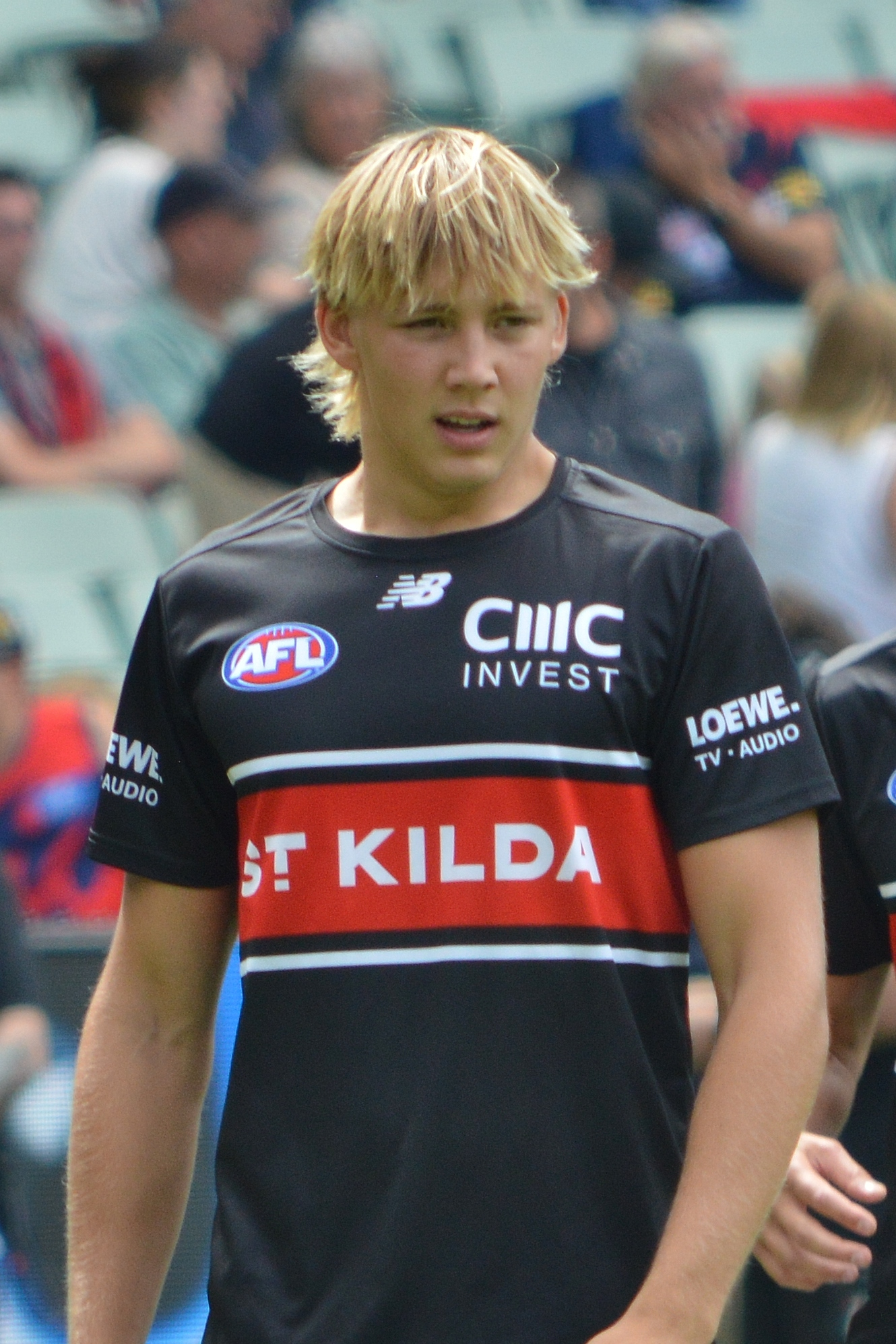
- Tauru in March 2026

Personal information
- Full name: Alixzander Tauru
- Nickname: The Flying Viking
- Born: 16 November 2006 (age 19)
- Original team: Warragul Industrials (WGFNC)/Gippsland Power
- Draft: No. 10, 2024 national draft
- Height: 193 cm (6 ft 4 in)

Club information
- Current club: St Kilda
- Number: 26

Playing career^{1}
Years	Club	Games (Goals)
2025–	St Kilda	18 (5)
- ^{1} Playing statistics correct to the end of round 22, 2026.

Alixzander Tauru (born 16 November 2006) is an Australian rules footballer who plays for the St Kilda Football Club in the Australian Football League (AFL). He was selected with pick 10 in the 2024 AFL draft.

== Early life ==
Tauru made his senior football debut at the age of 16, playing for Warragul Industrials in the West Gippsland Football Netball Competition (WGFNC). He also played for Gippsland Power in the Talent League Boys competition and for Victoria Country in the 2024 AFL National Championships.

== AFL career ==
Tauru's first AFL preseason was interrupted due to a stress fracture in his back. He made his Victorian Football League (VFL) debut for St Kilda's then reserves affiliate, Sandringham, in round 3 of the 2025 VFL season. In his third VFL match, Tauru was suspended for four matches (covering a six week period because of two byes) for rough conduct against Brisbane player Curtis McCarthy. The AFL approved under "exceptional circumstances" for the suspension to begin from Sandringham's practice match against the Tasmania Senior Talent Academy.

Tauru made his AFL debut in round 15 of the 2025 season, recording nine disposals in a 34-point loss to Collingwood. He went on to play all remaining games of the season.

== Personal life ==
Tauru's father was born in Sweden.

== Statistics ==
Updated to the end of round 22, 2026.

Legend
G	Goals	K	Kicks	D	Disposals	T	Tackles
B	Behinds	H	Handballs	M	Marks

Season	Team	No.	Games	Totals							Averages (per game)							Votes
Season	Team	No.	Games	G	B	K	H	D	M	T	G	B	K	H	D	M	T	Votes
2025	St Kilda	26	10	1	1	56	34	90	43	17	0.1	0.1	5.6	3.4	9.0	4.3	1.7	0
2026	St Kilda	26	8	4	2	41	24	65	26	7	0.5	0.3	5.1	3.0	8.1	3.3	0.9	0
Career			18	5	3	97	58	155	69	24	0.3	0.2	5.4	3.2	8.6	3.8	1.3	0
