= Mason Wood =

Australian rules footballer (born 1993)

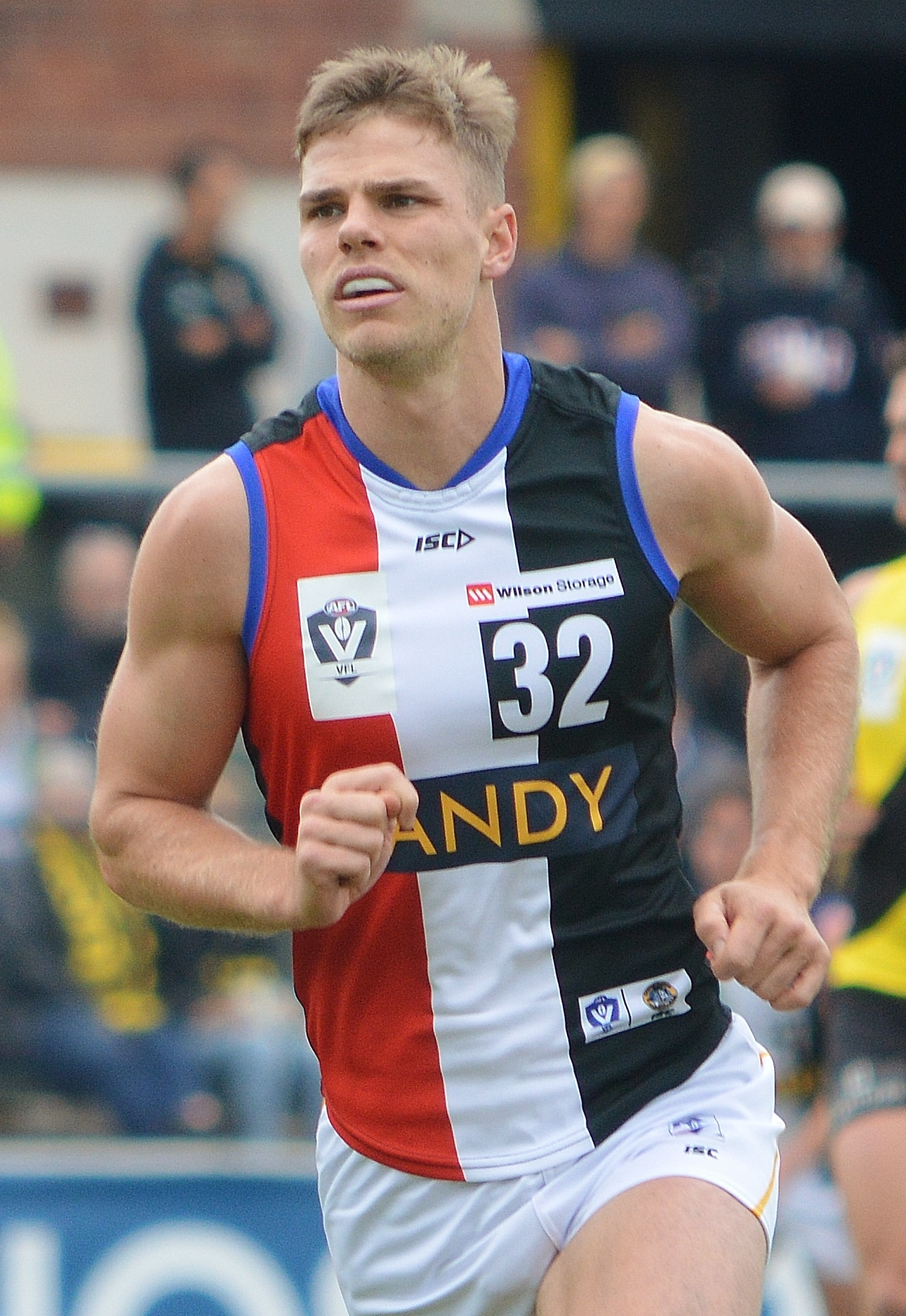
- Wood playing for St Kilda's reserves in April 2021

Personal information
- Full name: Mason Wood
- Born: 13 September 1993 (age 33)
- Original team: Geelong Falcons (TAC Cup)
- Draft: No. 41, 2012 national draft
- Height: 192 cm (6 ft 4 in) (6’3)
- Weight: 87 kg (192 lb)
- Positions: Forward, Wing

Club information
- Current club: St Kilda
- Number: 32

Playing career^{1}
Years	Club	Games (Goals)
2014–2020	North Melbourne	65 (76)
2021–	St Kilda	111 (81)
Total		174 (157)
- ^{1} Playing statistics correct to the end of round 22, 2026.

Mason Wood (born 13 September 1993) is an Australian rules footballer who plays for the St Kilda Football Club in the Australian Football League (AFL), having previously played for the North Melbourne Football Club.

== Career ==
=== North Melbourne ===
Wood was drafted to North Melbourne with pick 41 in the 2012 AFL national draft after playing for the Geelong Falcons in the TAC Cup and representing Victoria Country at the 2012 AFL Under 18 Championships.

Mason made his debut in the final game of the 2014 home and away season, kicking three goals, but was not selected during the finals.

Wood had a breakout 2019 season, scoring 22 goals in 13 games (for nine wins), including a four-goal haul against eventual premiers Richmond in round 11. However, Wood still had an interrupted season due to a number of injuries.

Wood played eight matches in 2020 in a COVID-interrupted season. He was delisted by North Melbourne at the end of the 2020 AFL season after a mass delisting by the club which saw 11 players cut from the team's list.

=== St Kilda ===
In 2021, Wood was picked up as a rookie by St Kilda ahead of the 2021 season as part of the supplementary selection period (SSP). In February 2021, Wood kicked four goals against his former club in a Saints' practice match victory against the Kangaroos, which was won by 91 points. Wood also played in the final quarter of the Saints' win against Carlton in the Community Series in early March.

== Statistics ==
Updated to the end of round 22, 2026.

Legend
G	Goals	K	Kicks	D	Disposals	T	Tackles
B	Behinds	H	Handballs	M	Marks

Season	Team	No.	Games	Totals							Averages (per game)							Votes
Season	Team	No.	Games	G	B	K	H	D	M	T	G	B	K	H	D	M	T	Votes
2013	North Melbourne	32	0	—	—	—	—	—	—	—	—	—	—	—	—	—	—	0
2014	North Melbourne	32	1	3	1	6	1	7	4	3	3.0	1.0	6.0	1.0	7.0	4.0	3.0	0
2015	North Melbourne	32	7	1	6	56	48	104	28	12	0.1	0.9	8.0	6.9	14.9	4.0	1.7	0
2016	North Melbourne	32	8	12	8	68	46	114	38	26	1.5	1.0	8.5	5.8	14.3	4.8	3.3	0
2017	North Melbourne	32	10	14	11	79	58	137	42	25	1.4	1.1	7.9	5.8	13.7	4.2	2.5	1
2018	North Melbourne	32	13	22	16	108	57	165	51	28	1.7	1.2	8.3	4.4	12.7	3.9	2.2	2
2019	North Melbourne	32	18	21	21	144	98	242	69	35	1.2	1.2	8.0	5.4	13.4	3.8	1.9	1
2020 (Note: The 2020 season was played with 17 home-and-away matches per team (down from 22) and 16-minute quarters with time on (down from 20-minute quarters with time on) due to the impact of the COVID-19 pandemic.)	North Melbourne	32	8	3	2	38	32	70	22	10	0.4	0.3	4.8	4.0	8.8	2.8	1.3	0
2021	St Kilda	32	9	7	2	51	41	92	30	24	0.8	0.2	5.7	4.6	10.2	3.3	2.7	0
2022	St Kilda	32	19	13	9	195	120	315	106	40	0.7	0.5	10.3	6.3	16.6	5.6	2.1	2
2023	St Kilda	32	24	15	11	332	180	512	161	64	0.6	0.5	13.8	7.5	21.3	6.7	2.7	1
2024	St Kilda	32	18	16	9	215	115	330	133	35	0.9	0.5	11.9	6.4	18.3	7.4	1.9	3
2025	St Kilda	32	21	22	21	207	101	308	124	34	1.0	1.0	9.9	4.8	14.7	5.9	1.6	0
2026	St Kilda	32	20	8	9	203	133	336	119	39	0.4	0.5	10.2	6.7	16.8	6.0	2.0	0
Career			176	157	126	1702	1030	2732	927	375	0.9	0.7	9.7	5.9	15.5	5.3	2.1	10
