= Sale High School, Victoria =

Former secondary school in Victoria, Australia

Coordinates: 38°5′51.65″S 147°4′57.53″E

Sale High School (formerly known as Sale Agricultural High School) was a secondary school in Sale, Victoria, Australia.

== History ==
It amalgamated with the Sale Technical School in 1996 to become the Sale College, Sale.

The Sale Agricultural High School operated on the property known as the High School farm on the Desaily's Flat to the west of Sale and from the Mechanics’ Institute building. In 1917 a new purpose-built building was opened for the school on the corner of Raymond St and Foster St (now the site of the Wellington Entertainment Centre, the Adult Continuing Education Centre, the Sale Special School and McMillan Institute). It operated in Sale from April 1907 as an agricultural school until 1928, when the agricultural section was closed down. The farm was purchased by a local Sale butcher, John G. Wakely, and is now the site of the Sale railway station.

The secondary school continued to operate until the number of students required a new premise, and the Guthridge Parade campus was opened in 1973. The High School continued to operate until 1996 when it amalgamated with the Sale Technical School. The Guthridge campus operates to this day for years 7 to 9, while years 10 to 12 attend the senior campus on the corner of Macalister and York St, Sale. The senior campus site being the old Technical School and still has on its grounds the original Mechanics’ Institute building.

=== School Logo ===
The original Sale High School's logo included a representation of a black swan, which is the symbol of Sale. The school moto – "Prorsum Semper Honeste" - "Onwards Always Honorably"

=== Educational Offerings ===
Although Sale High School no-longer exists, Sale College offers a wide range of subjects.
