= Sale College =

Location
- Sale, Victoria; Australia; 38.109231°S 147.068047°E

Information
- Type: Public, secondary, day school
- Motto: Achievement, Respect, Belonging
- Established: January 1996
- Principal: Andrew Stock
- Enrolment: ~1000 (7–12)
- Campus: Guthridge, Macalister
- Colours: Black, white, teal
- Website: salecollege.vic.edu.au

Sale College is a public day school located in Sale, in the state of Victoria, Australia. It is a high school broken up into two campuses. The Macalister campus(senior) and Guthridge campus (junior).

== History ==
It was formed in 1996 through the merger of Sale High School and Sale Technical School.

=== Sale Technical School ===
The former Sale Technical School was opened in 1885 and continued to operate until 1996.

== Facilities ==
=== Guthridge Campus ===
The Guthridge campus is the larger of the school's two campuses. This campus is used primarily for teaching years 7 to 9 but also contains two sports ovals and a performing arts center.

=== Macalister Campus ===
The Macalister campus is used primarily for teaching years 10 to 12. It incorporates the Sale Public Library within its bounds.

== Alumni ==
- Jason Gram, Australian rules footballer with the St Kilda Football Club
- Shane Birss, Australian rules footballer with the Western Bulldogs & St Kilda Football Clubs
