= Michelle Hamer =

Michelle Hamer may refer to:

- Michelle Hamer (artist), Australian visual artist
- Michelle Hamer (author), Australian author
