= Michelle Hamer (artist) =

Australian artist

Michelle Hamer is a visual artist based in Melbourne, Australia. She works across textiles, 3D, video, mark-making, photography, LED, sound, printmaking, and participatory projects. Hamer's multidisciplinary practice is primarily concerned with language as a means to interpret and disrupt relationships to urban environments.

Hamer has exhibited internationally across Australia, Europe, Asia, and the United States. Her work is held in major Australian collections, including the National Gallery of Victoria, Artbank, the City of Melbourne, Warrnambool Art Gallery, Gippsland Art Gallery, and Ararat Gallery TAMA. Her later work explores themes of dismissal and invalidation, including through the lens of healthcare, and the intersection of art and science at the Perron Institute for Neurological and Translational Science, where Hamer is an embedded researcher.

== Education and background ==
Hamer was awarded a Bachelor of Architecture (Hons) from the Royal Melbourne Institute of Technology and has worked as a lecturer across institutions.

== Selected works ==
Out of her critically acclaimed bodies of work, Hamer is best known for her hand-stitched pieces, described by Corbett Lyon as “needlepoint paintings”. Her processes are underpinned by a documentary approach of site-specificity, and photographic capture that turns “observations into revelations”. Hamer focused on the language of disbelief in her major 2024 project, I'm A Believer. It invited submissions on the topic of medical invalidation and built on Hamer's previous participatory methods.

=== Early Works (2005–2011) ===
From the beginning of her artistic practice, Hamer has been described as a “flaneur” engaged with moments in the urban space, with road signs and traffic signs as emerging themes. This imagery informed her signature half-stitch tapestries on commercially available, uniform-sized perforated plastic grids. These early stitched works culminated in series and solo shows, including Life in the Fast Lane (2005), I Get Good Advice from the Advertising World (RMIT, 2007), and Dangling Carrots (Craft Victoria, 2011). Hamer garnered attention for using everyday signage as a “cultural artefact [and] (...) marker”, inviting the audience to view it as “a projection of [their] own narratives”.

=== I Send Mixed Messages (2013) ===
In I Send Mixed Messages, exhibited at Counihan Gallery in Melbourne, Hamer presented works made in response to a 2011 Australia Council-funded residency in the US, where she took approximately 2,500 photographs of “in-between” moments, capturing the economic and political atmosphere at the time. She was praised for her compelling use of irony and dark humour, as well as the juxtaposition of the “toughness” of her source photographic imagery with the stitched quality of the finished pieces. The same panellists also highlighted Hamer's commitment to the "vernacular of place", arguing that her observations of the built environment revealed a broader shared psychological condition. Her unique and labour-intensive stitching process was described as producing a "soft pulling into focus".

The Atlantic described the “pixelated” appearance of Hamer's practice as translating contemporary digital imagery into hand-stitched works that combine "21st-century imagery with a 19th-century needlepoint veneer". Writing in 2014, design critic Steven Heller situated her work within a broader exploration of the relationship between analogue and digital image-making, highlighting her use of the stitch as a form of "primitive pixelation". Hamer explained that she was less interested in needlepoint as a traditional craft than in the conceptual relationship between manual labour and digital representation, drawing comparisons between embroidery, contemporary pixels, and historical narrative textiles such as the Bayeux Tapestry. Heller concluded that, despite the prominence of embroidery within her practice, Hamer's work was ultimately "more about time than stitching."

=== There Are No Words (2015, 2026) ===
There Are No Words is a recurring participatory project. It comprises approximately 240 hand-stitched black-and-white textile "flashcards" featuring fragments of text collected from found statements, e-mail subject lines, sticky notes, and overheard conversations.

Hamer developed the work over four years as an exhibition designed to incorporate audience participation. First presented at the Ararat Regional Art Gallery, participants were invited to rearrange the stitched text fragments into new phrases and meanings before photographing themselves with their chosen compositions. This process was documented using overhead time-lapse photography, which was subsequently projected onto a large stitched screen alongside the original textile works, extending the participatory process into the exhibition itself.

The Ararat presentation also included The Australian Challenge, a commissioned work responding to the town's built environment and local community, which entered the gallery's permanent collection. The project subsequently toured to regional galleries in Victoria.

A new iteration of the project was staged at the Rockhampton Museum of Art as part of the exhibition Intimacy, between May and July 2026; Hamer personally trained staff as facilitators. RMOA described the project as workshops of “found poetry (...) [of] language that appears as personal, very specific to time, place, and the people within the exchange, and also out of context.”

Hamer has described the work as an exploration of how meaning is constructed through the rearrangement of everyday language, while continuing her broader interest in grids, pixelation, and the relationship between manual craft and contemporary communication.

=== One Wall Two Jails (2017) ===
In 2015, Hamer received funding to travel to the US-Mexican and the Israeli-Palestinian borders, which culminated in the series One Wall Two Jails. The title comes from graffiti sighted by Hamer on the separation wall in Israel-Palestine, one of the many globally multiplying fortified barriers which the project confronts. Based on over 5,000 photographs taken in the border territories, Hamer responded with a body of “stitched photographs” and ink on paper works. She spoke about the process of image editing and selection of text, and thereafter, the editing of the image itself as tapestries in 36dpi. The capture of the photograph itself, she said, happens “in an instant”: “often when I'm moving in a car or on a bus, or walking, on my way somewhere.”

Among critics, NGV's Danielle Whitfield praised the work's “sense of map-making that reveals a very human narrative”. Former Chief Executive of Oxfam Australia Dr Helen Szoke argued that the use of cross-stitch created a contrast between the labour-intensive process of stitching and the immediacy of contemporary political messaging. Szoke interpreted the works as exploring the ambiguity of walls as structures that are both protective and exclusionary, and the ways in which signs, symbols, and language shape public understanding of conflict, migration, and human rights. She further inferred that Hamer's incorporation of mesh barriers, warning signs, and memorial symbols emphasised the contextual nature of language and contested meanings within contemporary border landscapes.

=== Are You Having A Good Night? and Relax, We’re Doing Great (both 2020) ===
Following her preparation for a survey show at Wagga Wagga Art Gallery in 2018, Hamer stated she had become increasingly aware of just how much of the language in her practice contained embedded threats. This theme led her to consider the routine verbal harassment experienced by women in public, in contrast to the more overt forms of domestic and physical violence commonly addressed by awareness-raising campaigns. The same year, she witnessed the false ballistic missile alert in Hawaii, and the resulting image of an LED traffic sign reading “THERE IS NO THREAT.” This “non-threat threat” summed up the language Hamer felt the need to explore—“a type of gaslighting that occurs,” she elaborated in an interview: “The threats can't be real because our safety is being declared.”

This culminated in two major bodies of stitched work. In Are You Having A Good Night?, tapestries of LED traffic signs featured both overt and ambiguous language typically aimed at women. In Relax, We’re Doing Great, Hamer explored pandemic-related language through the same motif of traffic signage. During this period of Hamer's career, her inclusion in the NGV's She Persists, a project focused on female artists held in the NGV's collection, highlighted Hamer's contribution to “craftivism”. Her new works were noted for their use of dark humour and ability to capture the collective experience.

Are You Having a Good Night? opened at the Fremantle Art Centre in September 2020, despite initial delays due to the COVID-19 pandemic. The show was Hamer's first solo exhibition in Western Australia. It was subsequently partially re-exhibited at the Noosa Regional Gallery in 2021, as well as the Logan Art Gallery and the Schoolhouse at Rosny Farm in Hobart, in the same year.

Relax, We’re Doing Great, a series of 124 new works made in response to the shifting language surrounding the global spread of COVID-19, enjoyed a similarly successful exhibition run. It was presented in full at MARS Gallery in 2022. Otherwise, partial showings of the body were exhibited as 2020 is Cancelled at the Warrnambool Art Centre, and subsequently acquired by the City of Nillumbik.

The projects attracted funding from the City of Nillumbik, the City of Melbourne, Creative Victoria, Creative Australia, and the Sidney Myer Fellowship. It received finalist nominations in the Sunshine Coast Art Prize and the invitation-only Redcliffe Art Prize, as well as the Fisher's Ghost Art Award.

In 2024, Hamer reflected on the impact of the shifting public discourse and language on her practice in an interview with Garland Mag. Based on observations from her archives, she commented on the relative optimism of language circa 2011, despite global events such as the global financial crisis and the post 9/11 sentiment. Hamer observed that, although public discourse became increasingly divisive following the brief sense of unity at the beginning of the COVID-19 pandemic in 2020, the language of branding and advertising had become the most "benign" she could recall. In the same interview, she reflects on the dynamic of increasing misinformation and disappearing nuance as historical phenomena and a cause for concern.

=== Wheel of Fortune (2022) ===
Working with the tapestries from Relax, We’re Doing Great, Hamer created a slot machine style video artwork exploring the “lottery” of language used in relation to the pandemic, climate change, and intensified politics. The video played nightly at Federation Square in Melbourne, from late February to the end of March in 2022.

=== I'm A Believer (2024) ===
I'm A Believer draws on Hamer's previous experience with collected imagery, publicly engaged work, and healthcare, comprising five hand-stitched pieces, 21 silkscreen print editioned pieces, and 65 monoprints, as well as an archive of redacted medical records, medical imaging, hand-written notes, and personal anecdotes. The project invited submissions of experiences of medical invalidation in a global call-out. Hamer then selected fragments of these submissions for her prints and tapestries to investigate the language of disbelief— for example, one submitted medical letter stated, “It is a fictitious condition that does not exist,”; another noted that the patient “was able to have golf lessons.” The project's title references a submission that included the line, “Personally, I am not a great believer.”

The hand-stitched pieces and the printed works were exhibited at Linden New Art in Melbourne. Redaction techniques—incorporated on account of medical privacy and to highlight the nuance and complexity of language therein—informed Hamer's aesthetic choices, including in the printmaking process with master printmaker Trent Walter, and Negative Press. To mimic a “clinically administrative” palette, the consistent use of cobalt blue, black, and grey was reserved for the letters: black for text redaction; cobalt blue for contrasting/revealing language; and grey for the traces of details from the physical letters that remained from their original printing, folding, stapling, scanning, and faxing processes. The accompanying exhibition documentation provided detailed contextual records for the individual hand-stitched works.

The exhibition was followed by a publication of the same title, featuring a multidisciplinary collection of essays by art critics and curators, a medical professional, and a fiction author. Responses to the project noted Hamer's use of medical imaging as portraiture, as well as the work revealing itself mostly through the act of redaction. Art historian and curator Dr Thomas A. Middlemost praised Hamer's “genius (...) in subverting” the bureaucratic and institutional practice of redacting—often associated with abuses of power—to “expose medical misogyny”.

=== The Perron Institute for Neurological and Translational Science (2025–ongoing) ===
Since 2025, Hamer has been working as part of a team of scientists, clinicians, and a young person with lived experience of mental illness, at the Perron Institute in Western Australia. The developing project, supported by the Stan Person Charitable Foundation and the University of Western Australia, focuses on repetitive Transcranial Magnetic Stimulation, or rTMS, as a non-invasive treatment for depression.

=== Group Shows ===
Hamer's work featured in multiple group shows, including at the Shepparton Art Museum in Victoria (Craftivism: Dissident Objects & Subversive Forms, 2019), the Museum of Contemporary Art in Sydney (The COVID Art Quilt, 2021), and at international art fairs such as the Lodz Tapestry Triennial in Poland.

In 2014, Hamer was asked by the National Gallery of Victoria to create two new Melbourne-based works, exhibited alongside some of her US-based works, for the Melbourne Now exhibition. It was at this time that she began testing involving the audience in her processes.

Multiple universities have featured Hamer's work in group exhibitions, including Michigan State University and RMIT.

== Residencies, Awards, and Collections ==
Hamer has been awarded grants since 2005, from the Australia Council, Creative Victoria, City of Melbourne, and the Sidney Myer Foundation. She is a past winner of the Australian Tapestry Workshop's Architecture in Tapestry Prize (2015) and the Fishersghost Macability Prize (2022).

Hamer's work has been acquired by private collectors, as well as permanent and public collections, including the National Gallery of Victoria; Artbank, Australia; City of Melbourne; Textile Art Museum Ararat; Warrnambool Art Gallery, Gippsland Art Gallery, Nillumbik City Council, State Library of Victoria, State Library of Western Australia, State Library of New South Wales, State Library Victoria, National Library of Australia.

== Other appointments ==
Hamer currently holds the title of Adjunct Lecturer within the School of Biological Sciences at the University of Western Australia. She is a founding and executive Director of Connective Tissue Disorders Network Australia.
