= Ann Greenwood =

Australian textile artist

- Born: 1939 (age 86–87)
- Known for: Textile arts

Ann Greenwood (born 1939) is an Australian textile artist and art teacher. Her work is represented in the collections of the National Gallery of Victoria, the art collections of Glen Eira and Monash councils in Melbourne, the Gippsland Art Gallery, and Ararat Gallery TAMA.

Ann Greenwood uses very simple weaving techniques. Over the years her work has developed more towards sculpture.

In 1990 Ann visited Bhutan at the invitation of the Australian International Development and Assistance Bureau. Her visit was "to study the implications of finer wool and see how the women, who looked after the flocks, would process it and spin it."

In 2018, aged 79, Ann moved from Gippsland to Berwick, an outer south-eastern suburb of Melbourne. In November 2018 and January 2019 an exhibition of her work entitled The Peacock Garden was held at the Gippsland Art Gallery.
