= Gippsland Times =

The Gippsland Times is a newspaper published in Sale, Victoria, Australia since 1861. It is now part of Fairfax Media's group of regional newspapers.

Its full title is The Gippsland Times and Maffra Spectator, reflecting a takeover of the previously separate Maffra Spectator, which was based in Maffra.
