= Sale, Victoria =

Sale
- City
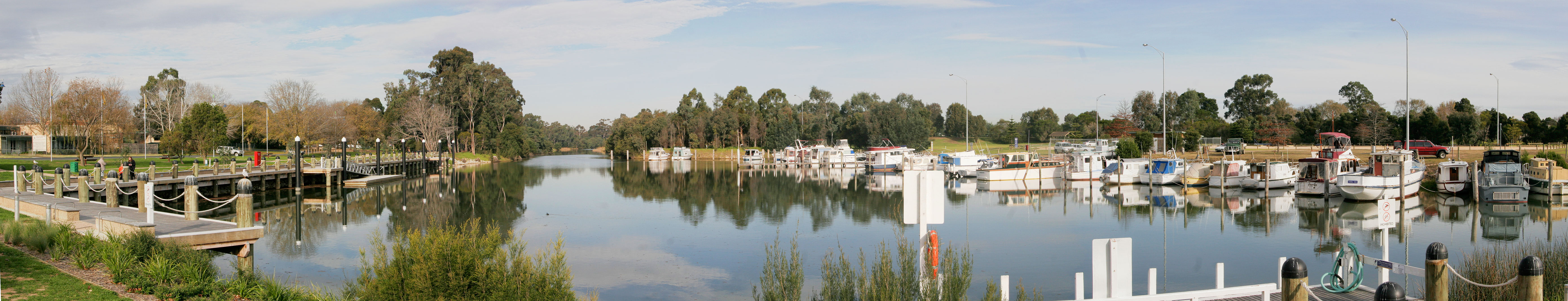
- View of the Port of Sale

- Coordinates: 38°06′S 147°04′E
- Country: Australia
- State: Victoria
- LGA: Shire of Wellington
- Location: 212 km (132 mi) from Melbourne; 105 km (65 mi) from Lakes Entrance; 218 km (135 mi) from Mansfield; 65 km (40 mi) from Bairnsdale; 54 km (34 mi) from Traralgon
- Established: 1844

Government
  - State electorate: Gippsland South
  - Federal division: Gippsland

Area (2011 urban)
  - Total: 45.6 km^{2} (17.6 sq mi)
- Elevation: 5.0 m (16.4 ft)

Population
  - Total: 14,296 (2021 census)
  - Density: 313.5/km^{2} (812.0/sq mi)
- Mean max temp: 19.7 °C (67.5 °F)
- Mean min temp: 8.2 °C (46.8 °F)
- Annual rainfall: 592.4 mm (23.32 in)
Localities around Sale
| Maffra | Stratford | Airly |
| Rosedale | Sale | Cobains |
| Pearsondale | Longford | Dutson |

Sale is a city situated in the Gippsland region of Victoria, Australia and the council capital of the Shire of Wellington. It had an estimated population of 15,305 in 2022 according to the Australian Bureau of Statistics. The total population including the immediate area around the town is approximately 19,000 according to shire website.

== Toponymy ==
The Aboriginal name for the Sale area is Wayput.

The first town plots went on sale in 1850. When the new settlement was gazetted in 1851 it was named "Sale" – a tribute to General Sir Robert Sale, a British army officer who won fame in the first Afghan war before being killed in battle in Mudki(Panjab) in 1845. An SBS TV documentary, Afghanistan: The Great Game – A Personal View by Rory Stewart, claims that it is actually named after his wife, Lady Florentia Sale (1790–1853), who wrote a famous journal of her experiences during the First Anglo-Afghan War which became a best seller in the 1840s and was serialised in The Times (UK) and possibly in Australia. Certainly, her letters to her husband were enthusiastically published in Australian papers.

In 2021, there was a proposal by locals to change the town name from 'Sale' − due to similarity with English word, sale − to either, 'Wayput' or 'Flooding Creek', but turned out to be unsuccessful.

== History ==
Two famous Gippsland explorers, Paul Strzelecki and Angus McMillan, passed through the immediate area around 1840. The first white settler was Archibald McIntosh who arrived in 1844 and established his 'Flooding Creek' property on the flood plain country which was duly inundated soon after his arrival.

In the 1840s, drovers heading south to Port Albert crossed Flooding Creek and were confronted with the difficult marsh country around the Thomson and Latrobe rivers. A punt operated across the Latrobe River until a toll bridge was erected. A Post Office named Flooding Creek opened here on 30 September 1848 being renamed, somewhat belatedly, as Sale on 1 January 1854.

The town greatly benefitted from the 1851 gold rush at Omeo as it was situated on the Port Albert to Omeo route and was an important base for the goldfields, until the arrival of the Gippsland railway line. It was also an important service centre for East Gippsland and the Monaro Plains of New South Wales. A building boom took place c. 1855–65.

In 1863 the population of Sale reached 1,800 and it became a borough. The courthouse opened the following year. Shops, hotels and offices spilled over into Raymond Street and the first Anglican Church was erected on the site now occupied by St Anne's and Gippsland Grammar School. The Gippsland Times newspaper was established in 1861 while the first Star Hotel and the Criterion Hotel were built in 1865.

In terms of access, the first reasonable road from Melbourne arrived in 1865 and Cobb & Co established a rough-and-ready 24-hour coach service linking Melbourne and Sale. The Latrobe Wharf was built in the 1870s and two hotels emerged to exploit the new centre of activity. It was located near the present swing bridge although little is left.

Anthony Trollope visited Sale in 1872. Writing of the experience in Australia and New Zealand (1873) he spoke of the town's "innumerable hotels" and concluded from his impressions that the Aborigines had little chance of surviving as a race. In late December 1874, a visitor to the township recorded a description of Sale “which has all the appearances of a flourishing township”. He observed that “the streets are wide and shops plentiful, but fruit is scarce, a few stale cherries being all I could obtain from the principal shop in the place”.

With the growth of shipping on the local waterways and the Gippsland Lakes (and the establishment of a railhead at Sale in 1879) schemes emerged to develop Sale as a port. The construction of the Sale Canal (complete with turning circle) duly commenced in the 1880s, thereby linking the town via the Thomson River and the Gippsland Lakes to the open sea. It was completed in 1890. Other elements were the Sale Swing Bridge, completed in 1883, a high wharf, and a launching ramp which still exists in the heart of the city. However, neither the bridge nor the canal created the desired surge of trade and the depression of the 1890s soon engulfed the town.

St Paul's Cathedral is the cathedral church of the Anglican Diocese of Gippsland in Australia. The cathedral building, built in 1884, is a double-storey building with a rectangular footprint and is constructed of red brick and slate roofing. A two-storey post office, with clock tower, was built in 1884 (it was demolished in 1963).

HM Prison Sale was completed in 1887 and it operated for 110 years until it was replaced by a private Fulham Correctional Centre. The building has since been demolished, with only part of the large brick fencing still remaining. The site remained empty until 2014 when construction of the new Sale Police Station commenced there. It opened in March 2015.

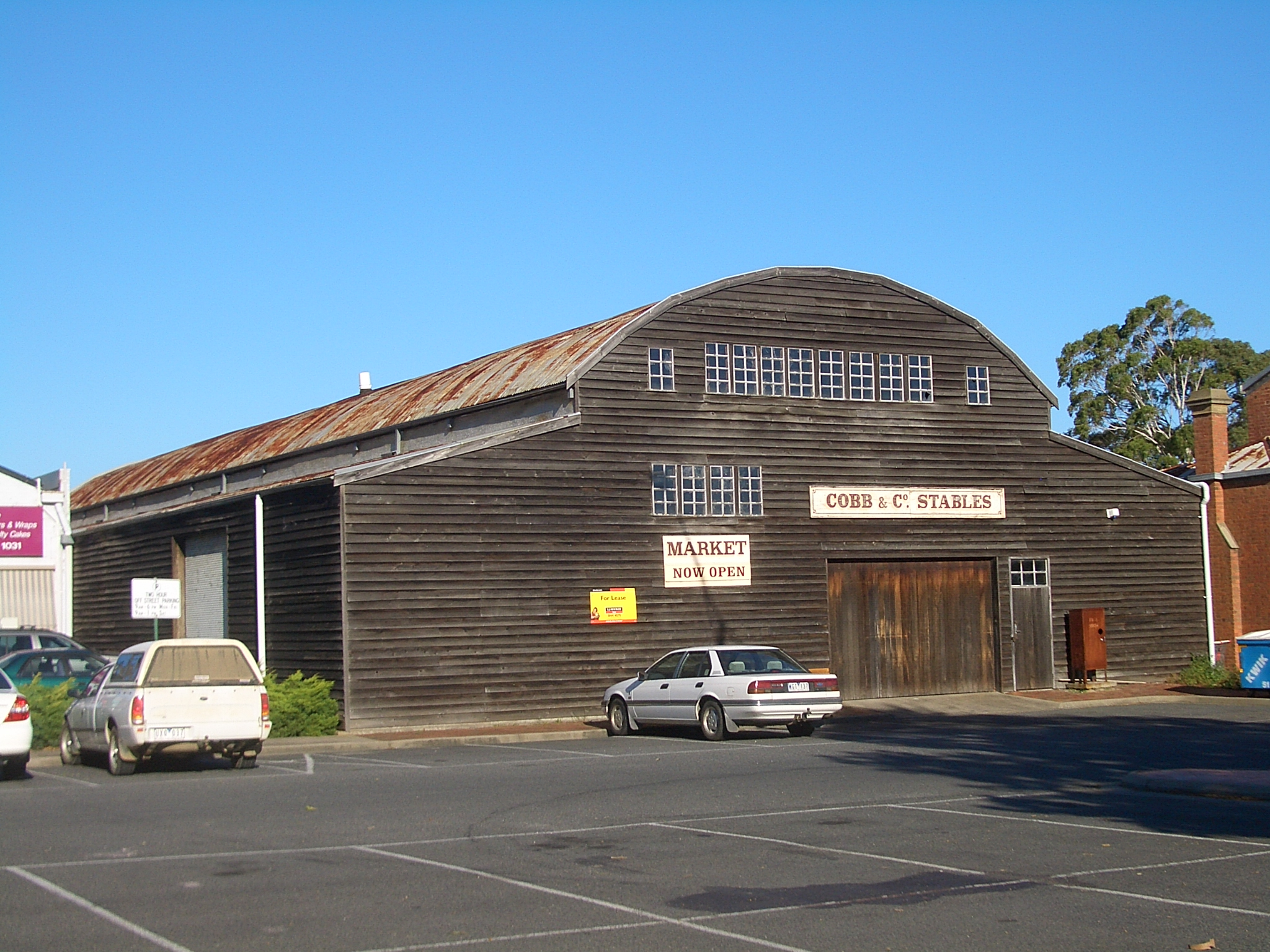
Cobb & Co stables in Sale (2008)

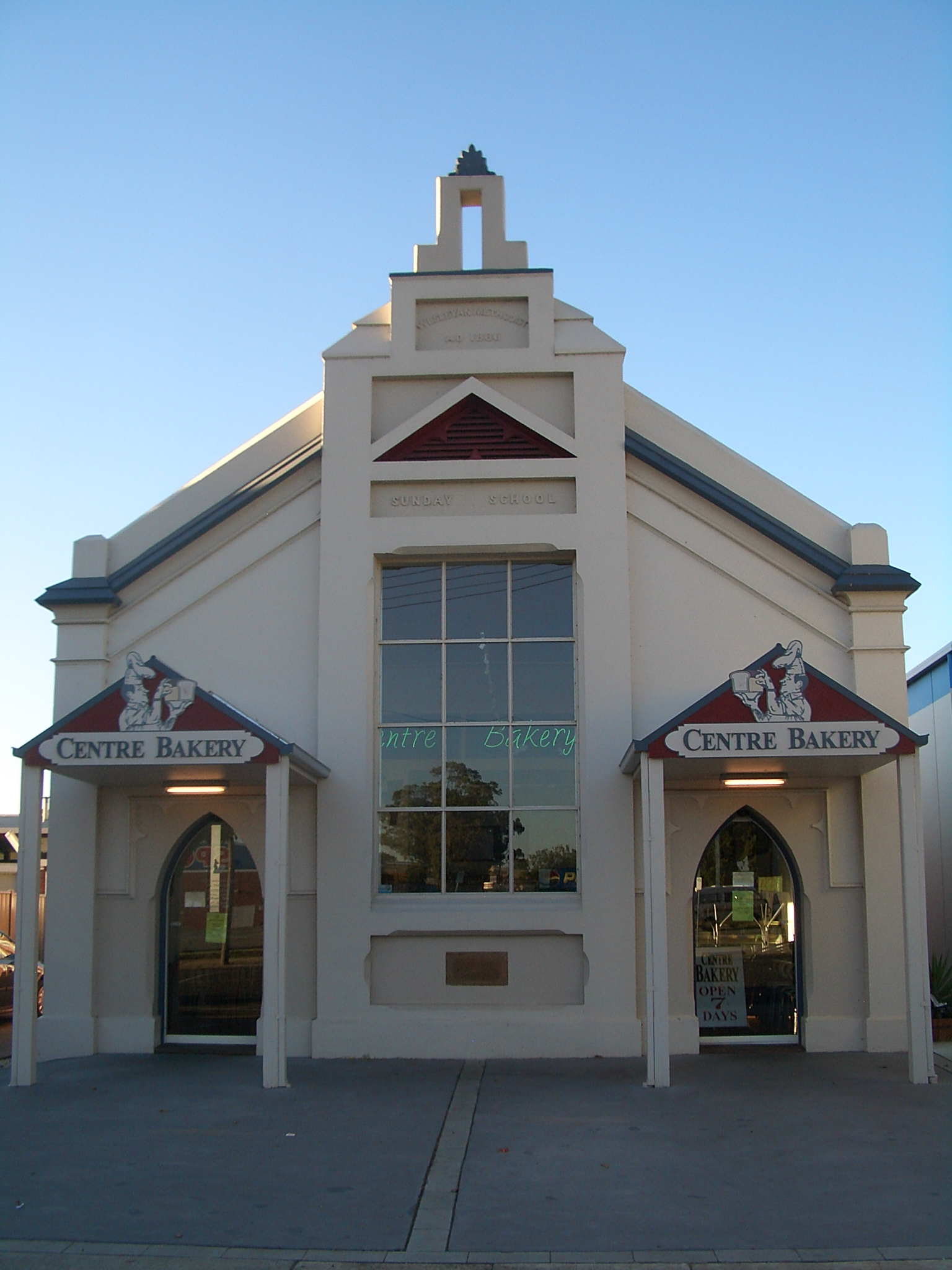
Former Wesleyan Methodist Church (now, a bakery)

Other landmarks in the town include Our Lady of Sion Convent and the Criterion Hotel. The former was designed by architects Reed, Smart and Tappin and built 1892–1901. Assembly halls and dormitory rear wing were added in 1938; the residential wing was added in 1953. The building is listed on the Register of the National Estate. The Criterion Hotel was built in 1865. It originally had a two-storey timber verandah, but this was replaced by a cast iron verandah between 1880 and 1900. It is considered "one of the most impressive hostelries in Victoria" and is listed on the Register of the National Estate. The Criterion Hotel closed in 2006 and its rapidly deteriorating condition caused local concern that it would be demolished. However, the site was subsequently purchased by a Traralgon-based developer who had previous expertise in restoration of commercial buildings. The Criterion received a complete rebuild in 2010/11 with the external heritage facade and verandah fully restored. It re-opened as a hotel, function venue and restaurant early in 2013.

Sale became a town in 1924 and a city in 1950.

In World War II, the West Sale RAAF base was the landing site of two Japanese Mitsubishi Zeros. After the war, the disused site was repurposed as a immigration centre called West Sale Migrant’s Camp (alternatively West Sale Migrant Holding Centre) from 1949–1953.

Sale has seen much development and redevelopment in the past decade, one example being the multimillion-dollar redevelopment of the city's Port of Sale.

=== Sale Swing Bridge ===
The Sale Swing Bridge, built in 1880-1883 is a heritage engineering structure that is the oldest such bridge in Australia and one of only a very small number remaining in the country. It featured in the Australian film noir movie "The Tender Hook".

== Geography ==
=== Setting ===
Sale is located in the Gippsland region of Victoria, around 212 km (132 mi) east of Melbourne. It is situated on the Princes Highway where it meets the South Gippsland Highway, and is the main urban area in the Shire of Wellington. The city is around 30 km (19 mi) inland from the coast, and is located on the edge of a large wetland system upstream of the junction of Thomson River with the Latrobe River. There is a history of significant floods affecting Sale, including in 1978, 1990 and 2007.

=== Sale Canal ===
Flooding Creek flows around the western side of the town, before becoming the Sale Canal, a 2.4 km (1.5 mi) excavated channel completed in 1890 that provides a navigable waterway from the Port of Sale to the lower reaches of the Thomson River, the Gippsland Lakes and the open sea. The Sale Canal connects to other local rivers and lakes, leading eventually to Lakes Entrance, an oceanside tourist resort situated near a managed, naturally occurring channel connecting the Gippsland Lakes to Bass Strait. Once steam boats and ocean-going craft were able to journey from Lakes Entrance to Sale, arriving at the docks at Sale to ferry passengers and goods from Eastern Victoria, although its success in such a role was short lived.

=== Lake Guthridge ===
Lake Guthridge is a low lying retention basin in the city, which serves as an ornamental lake and features a park for children, barbecues, and a walking trail around the lake and car parking facilities. Prior to refurbishment in the mid-1990s Lake Guthridge suffered a blue-green algae problem that resulted in widespread fish mortality until local joggers and nearby residents complained of the associated stench causing council to act. Lake Guthridge has never been used as a food source.

=== Climate ===
Sale has an oceanic climate (Köppen: Cfb), with mild to warm summers and cool winters. Average maxima vary from 25.6 °C (78.1 °F) in January to 13.9 °C (57.0 °F) in July while average minima fluctuate between 13.2 °C (55.8 °F) in February and 3.3 °C (37.9 °F) in July. Mean rainfall is moderately low (averaging 592.4 mm (23.32 in) per annum), as the town is affected by foehn winds. Sale receives 141.1 precipitation days annually, with a maximum frequency of rain in winter. The town only experiences 54.8 clear days whilst having 167.5 cloudy days per annum. Extreme temperatures have ranged from 44.6 °C (112.3 °F) on 25 January 2019 to −6.6 °C (20.1 °F) on 3 July 2017.

Climate data for Sale (38.12°S 147.13°E, 5 m AMSL) (1943–2024 normals & extremes)
| Month | Jan | Feb | Mar | Apr | May | Jun | Jul | Aug | Sep | Oct | Nov | Dec | Year |
|---|---|---|---|---|---|---|---|---|---|---|---|---|---|
| Record high °C (°F) | 44.6 (112.3) | 44.4 (111.9) | 40.4 (104.7) | 35.9 (96.6) | 28.3 (82.9) | 23.2 (73.8) | 24.0 (75.2) | 28.3 (82.9) | 33.0 (91.4) | 34.7 (94.5) | 40.8 (105.4) | 42.1 (107.8) | 44.6 (112.3) |
| Mean daily maximum °C (°F) | 25.6 (78.1) | 25.4 (77.7) | 23.6 (74.5) | 20.4 (68.7) | 16.9 (62.4) | 14.3 (57.7) | 13.9 (57.0) | 15.1 (59.2) | 17.2 (63.0) | 19.4 (66.9) | 21.4 (70.5) | 23.5 (74.3) | 19.7 (67.5) |
| Mean daily minimum °C (°F) | 13.0 (55.4) | 13.2 (55.8) | 11.6 (52.9) | 8.7 (47.7) | 6.3 (43.3) | 4.2 (39.6) | 3.3 (37.9) | 4.2 (39.6) | 5.6 (42.1) | 7.6 (45.7) | 9.7 (49.5) | 11.5 (52.7) | 8.2 (46.9) |
| Record low °C (°F) | 3.9 (39.0) | 3.3 (37.9) | 2.8 (37.0) | −1.7 (28.9) | −4.2 (24.4) | −4.5 (23.9) | −6.6 (20.1) | −5.6 (21.9) | −3.7 (25.3) | −1.0 (30.2) | 1.1 (34.0) | 2.2 (36.0) | −6.6 (20.1) |
| Average precipitation mm (inches) | 45.1 (1.78) | 40.6 (1.60) | 48.7 (1.92) | 48.8 (1.92) | 49.1 (1.93) | 47.2 (1.86) | 40.5 (1.59) | 45.7 (1.80) | 49.3 (1.94) | 58.6 (2.31) | 63.3 (2.49) | 55.7 (2.19) | 592.4 (23.32) |
| Average precipitation days (≥ 0.2 mm) | 8.6 | 7.7 | 9.1 | 10.6 | 12.5 | 13.6 | 14.1 | 14.8 | 14.0 | 13.7 | 12.0 | 10.4 | 141.1 |
| Average afternoon relative humidity (%) | 51 | 53 | 54 | 56 | 63 | 66 | 64 | 59 | 59 | 58 | 56 | 54 | 58 |
| Average dew point °C (°F) | 12.2 (54.0) | 12.9 (55.2) | 11.7 (53.1) | 9.7 (49.5) | 8.5 (47.3) | 7.0 (44.6) | 5.9 (42.6) | 5.7 (42.3) | 7.0 (44.6) | 8.5 (47.3) | 9.8 (49.6) | 11.1 (52.0) | 9.2 (48.5) |
| Mean monthly sunshine hours | 260.4 | 217.5 | 210.8 | 183.0 | 151.9 | 132.0 | 155.0 | 179.8 | 192.0 | 217.0 | 225.0 | 244.9 | 2,369.3 |
| Percentage possible sunshine | 58 | 57 | 55 | 55 | 49 | 46 | 51 | 54 | 54 | 53 | 53 | 53 | 53 |
Source: Bureau of Meteorology (1943–2024 normals & extremes)

== Economy and infrastructure ==
=== Oil and gas ===
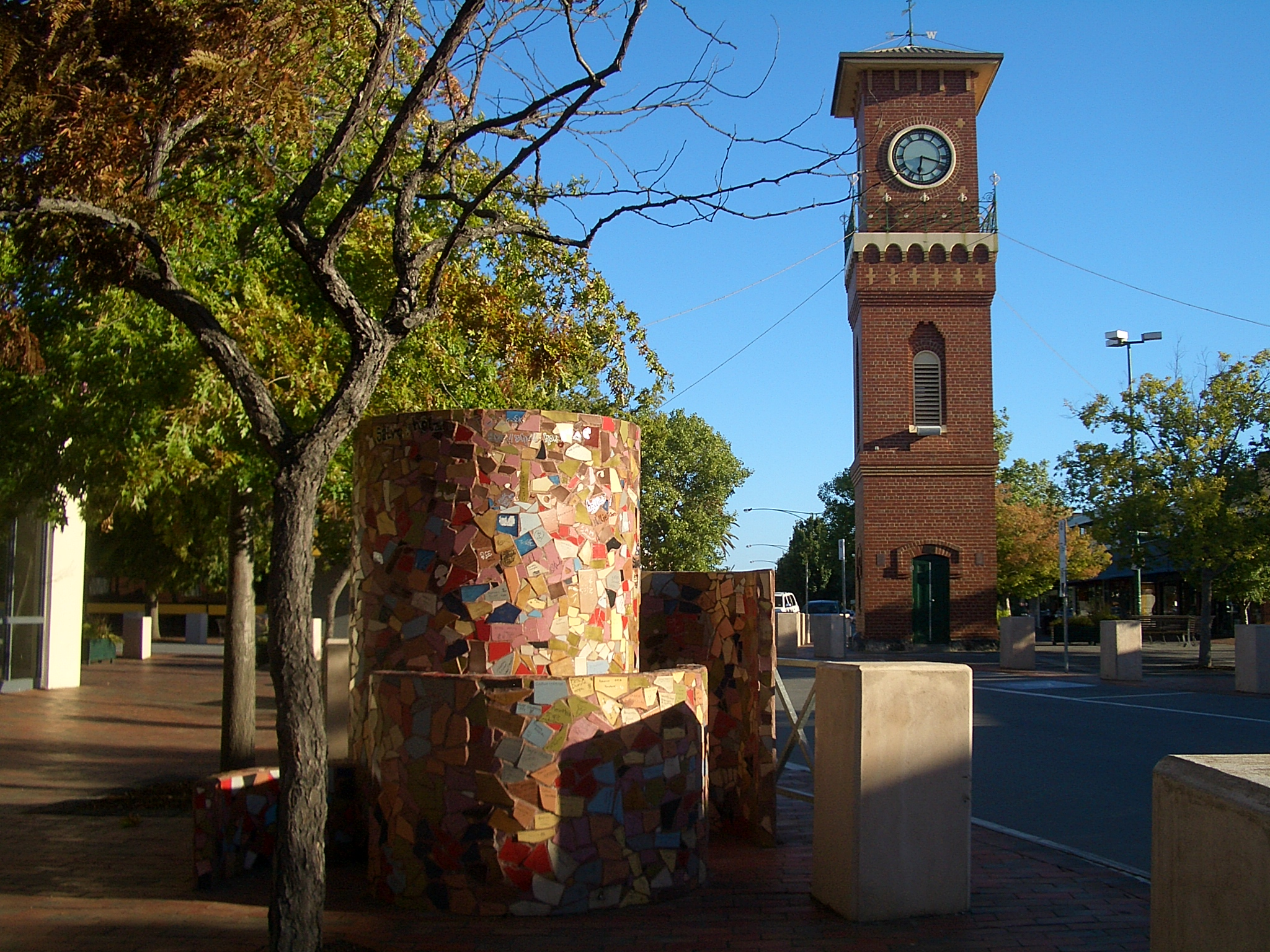
In the town centre

After oil was discovered offshore in 1965, the town experienced a boom period when it became the service and residential base of the Esso-BHP oil and gas exploration and development program. The unprocessed oil and gas are pumped through 700 kilometres (430 mi) of undersea pipes to Longford, 19 kilometres (12 mi) south of Sale. There the hydrocarbons are removed and used to produce LPG, commercial-grade natural gas, and stabilised oil. The gas is piped to Melbourne and the Victorian gas grid and up to New South Wales via the Eastern gas pipeline with a branch running under Bass Strait to Tasmania and the oil to Westernport Bay and thence to Geelong and Altona from where it is shipped interstate and overseas.

Esso's Longford gas plant was the site of a major fire on 25 September 1998 which killed two employees and crippled the state's gas supplies for a period of two weeks. Previously, Sale was significant as an office centre for the Esso corporation but these operations were relocated around 1990, leaving only the oil and gas processing facility in nearby Longford.

=== Commerce ===
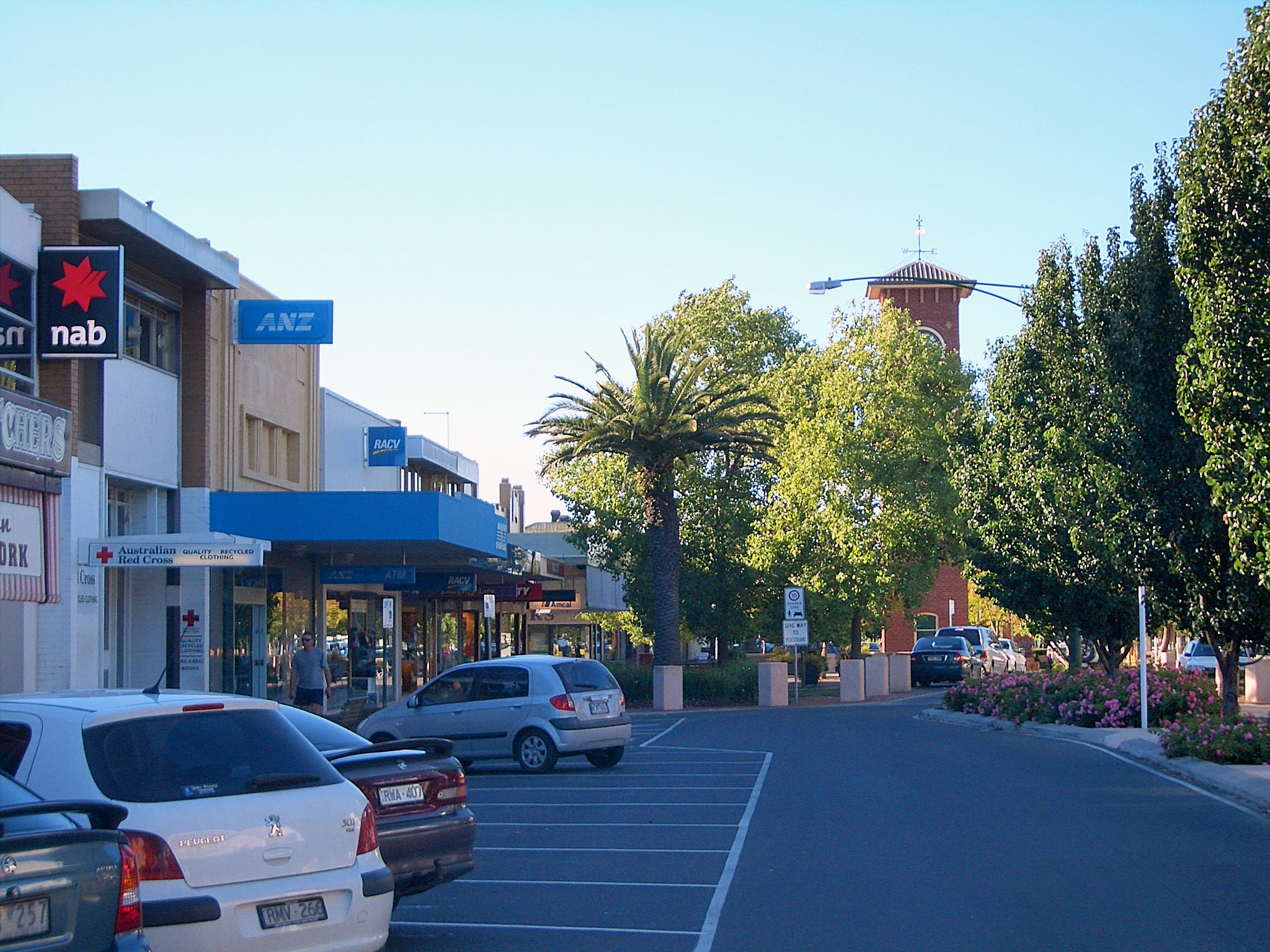
Sale City Centre

Sale's main shopping precincts are Gippsland Centre and adjacent Raymond St Mall. Most other shopping style stores including clothing, music and food can be found along Raymond St, known to be the main street of Sale.

Fulham Correctional Centre, a medium security prison, is in the locality of Fulham to the west of Sal

== Culture ==
=== Cultural venues ===
Sale is home to the Gippsland Art Gallery, a major Victorian public gallery. The gallery presents a diverse exhibition program of contemporary, modern and historical exhibitions, with a focus on the landscape of South Eastern Australia. The gallery holds a collection of nearly 1,000 artworks, with a small selection on permanent view.

The John Leslie Theatre (The Wedge) is a contemporary hub for performing arts and entertainment complete with theatre, versatile meeting rooms and modern café. It is the primary place to view live theatre, ballet and music, but also host conferences and presentations. Large events like the local Carols by Candlelight or Shakespearean performances are often performed outdoors at Fauna Park.

Every Saturday, Sunday, and Monday, the Gippsland Armed Forces Museum is open, featuring local military and significant history and artifacts. In recent times it has moved from its original location on Punt Lane to a bigger building at West Sale Airfield, after the original building was purchased for development works. The museum pays homage to the 13th Australian Light Horse Regiment, among others.

On 30 May 2009, Sale hosted Triple J's One Night Stand at the Sale Football Ground. Sale also has a strong underground music scene; events are held every few months and attract scores of young people.

=== Religion ===
Several Churches serve the Sale community including Catholic, Anglican, FIEC, Presbyterian, and Uniting. According to the 2021 census, the most common responses for religion in Sale (Urban Centres and Localities) were no religion 38.8%, Catholic 20.5%, Anglican 13.7%, Uniting Church 3.3%, and Unstated 6.9%. Overall, in 2016, 46.6% of the population nominated a religion, and 45.8% said they had no religion, compared with 43.8% and 45.7% respectively for Wellington Shire.

== Attractions and amenities ==
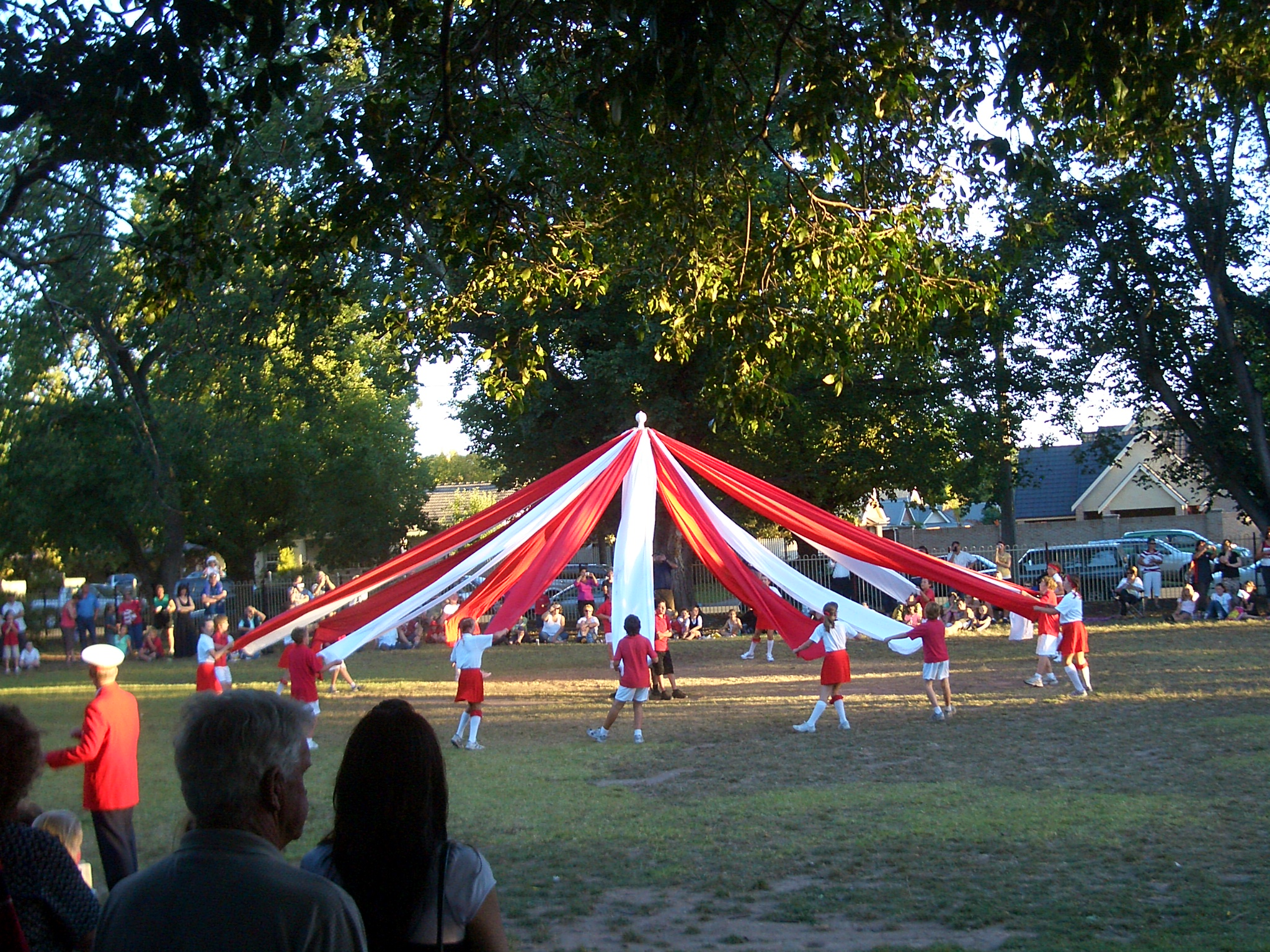
Sale Primary schoolchildren perform maypole dance

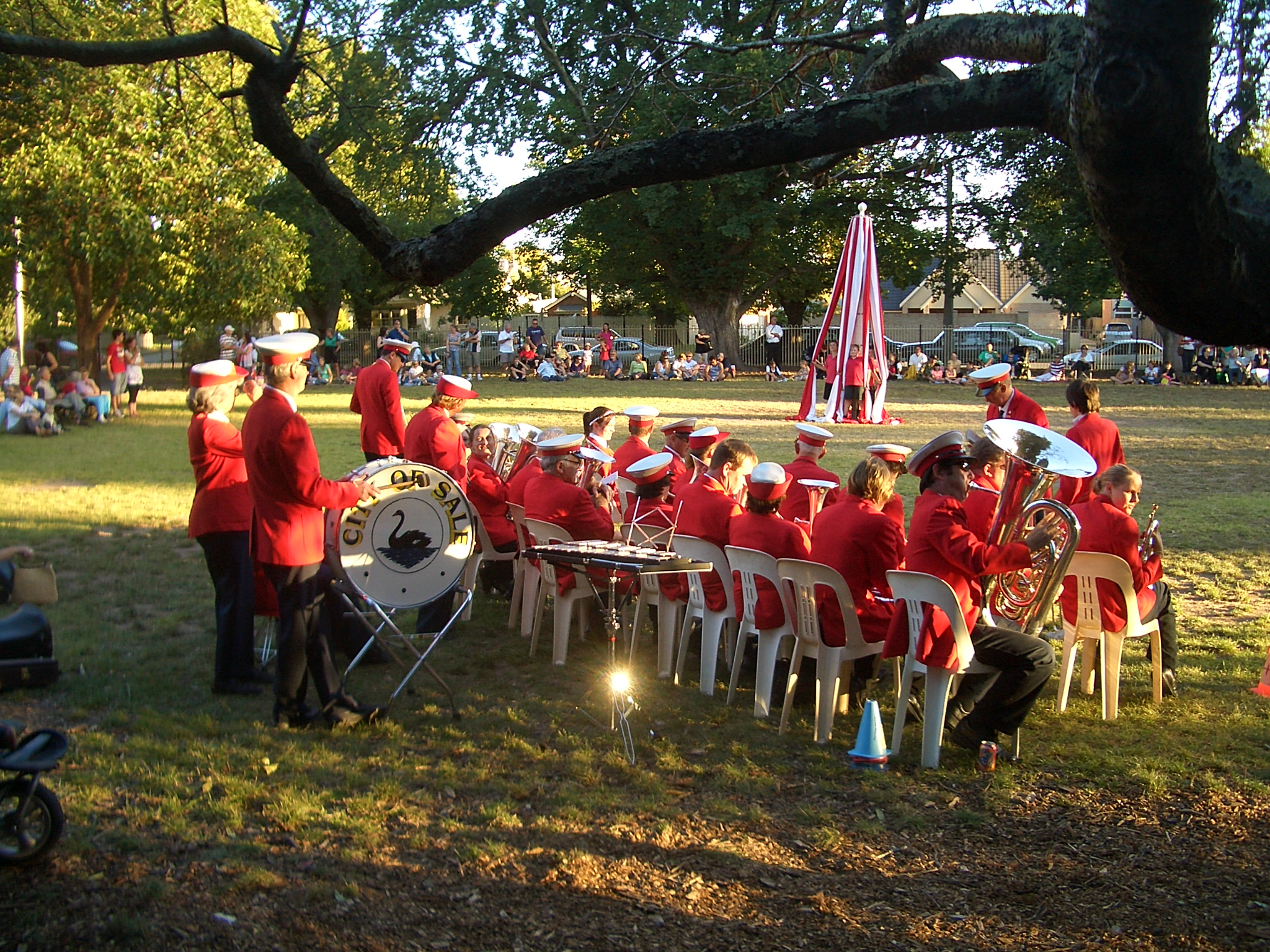
City band

=== Sale canal ===
In recent years, a grassroots effort helped to persuade the local council to invest in restoration of the foreshore and to protect against erosion. Prior to the rise of Common Carp as the predominant fish species due to nutrient overload from agricultural runoff, Sale Canal featured pristine waters and native fish stocks. The Sale Regatta is run yearly on a long straight section of the canal headed towards Longford. Visitors to Sale are usually unaware of the Canal, including its restoration, due to roadside views of it being blocked by the former Esso corporation headquarters, half of which is commercially let office space and the other half having been re-developed into a multimillion-dollar Library and Art Gallery.

=== Regular events ===
The March Labour Day weekend witnesses the Marley Point Overnight Yacht Race which is the longest overnight inland yacht race in the world. It begins near Sale and concludes at Paynesville, some 60 km away.

A fishing contest is held at Lake Guthridge every Easter and the Sale Music Festival at Gippsland Grammar School in June. The Sale Art Exhibition is held over August and September, while the Sale show falls in October.

=== Sports and recreation facilities ===
Gippsland Regional Sports Complex (GRSC), owned and operated by Wellington Shire Council, is 5 acres in size and caters for a wide variety of sports and recreational activities including basketball, netball, volleyball and hockey to name a few.

Aqua Energy, owned and operated by Wellington Shire Council, Aqua Energy has three heated indoor pools which are open all year round, and also two outdoor pools which are open during the warmer months. The facility is also home to a modern gym with group fitness classes for all ages, cafe, childcare, swim school and personal training.

== Sports ==
Australian rules football, soccer, basketball and cricket are the most popular sports in Sale. The Gippsland Regional Sports Complex hosts many other sports including basketball, Association rules football, volleyball, badminton, table tennis, indoor soccer, aerobics, group fitness and gym.

The city has two Australian rules football teams, Sale, competing in the Gippsland Football League and Sale City, who compete in the North Gippsland Football League.

Sale was one of pioneering centres of soccer in Gippsland, with a rich history dating back to 1925, where the club played in the North Gippsland Soccer Association (alongside Yallourn SC and clubs from Maffra, Glenmaggie and Nambrok)., with a league formed in 1926. The RAAF Base East Sale also later competed in the LVSL.

Sale United currently plays in the Latrobe Valley Soccer League and was crowned as league champions in 1980, as well as Battle of Britain Cup champions in 1955. The club was also the home of former National Soccer League star Marcus Stergiopoulos.

It is home to the Sale Sonics, a representative basketball team that competes in the Country Basketball League and is renowned for developing many elite Australian rules football and National Basketball League players including Jason Gram, Scott Pendlebury, Dylan McLaren and Rhys Carter .

The city is the home to two field hockey clubs in the East Gippsland Hockey Association. The Sale Hockey Club fields teams in juniors mixed under 13s, under 15s, and under 18s along with two women's teams, the Sale Cygnets and the Sale Swans, along with one open team. The Wurruk Greyhounds are the Sale district's second hockey team, located in the satellite town Wurruk.

Sale has a horse racing club, the Sale Turf Club, which schedules around 21 race meetings a year including the Sale Cup meeting in October.

The Sale Greyhound Racing Club holds regular greyhound racing meetings at the Sale Showgrounds. The Showgrounds hosted the first meeting on 6 February 1936 with newer tracks built in 1963 and 1982.

Golfers play at the course of the Sale Golf Club on Longford–Rosedale Road in neighbouring Longford.

Sale is also home to a baseball club whose baseball diamonds are located at Stephenson Park. There are both junior and senior teams competing in the Latrobe Valley Baseball Association.

== Infrastructure ==
=== Transport ===
Sale is located at the junction of the Princes Highway and the northeastern end of the South Gippsland Highway. As a tribute to the late King George V, an elm-lined section of the Princes Highway is named King George V Avenue.

The city is also on the Gippsland railway line and is served by V/Line services from Southern Cross to Bairnsdale that stops at the local railway station. Until 1983 the station was situated in the centre of town, on what is now the Gippsland Centre shopping centre.

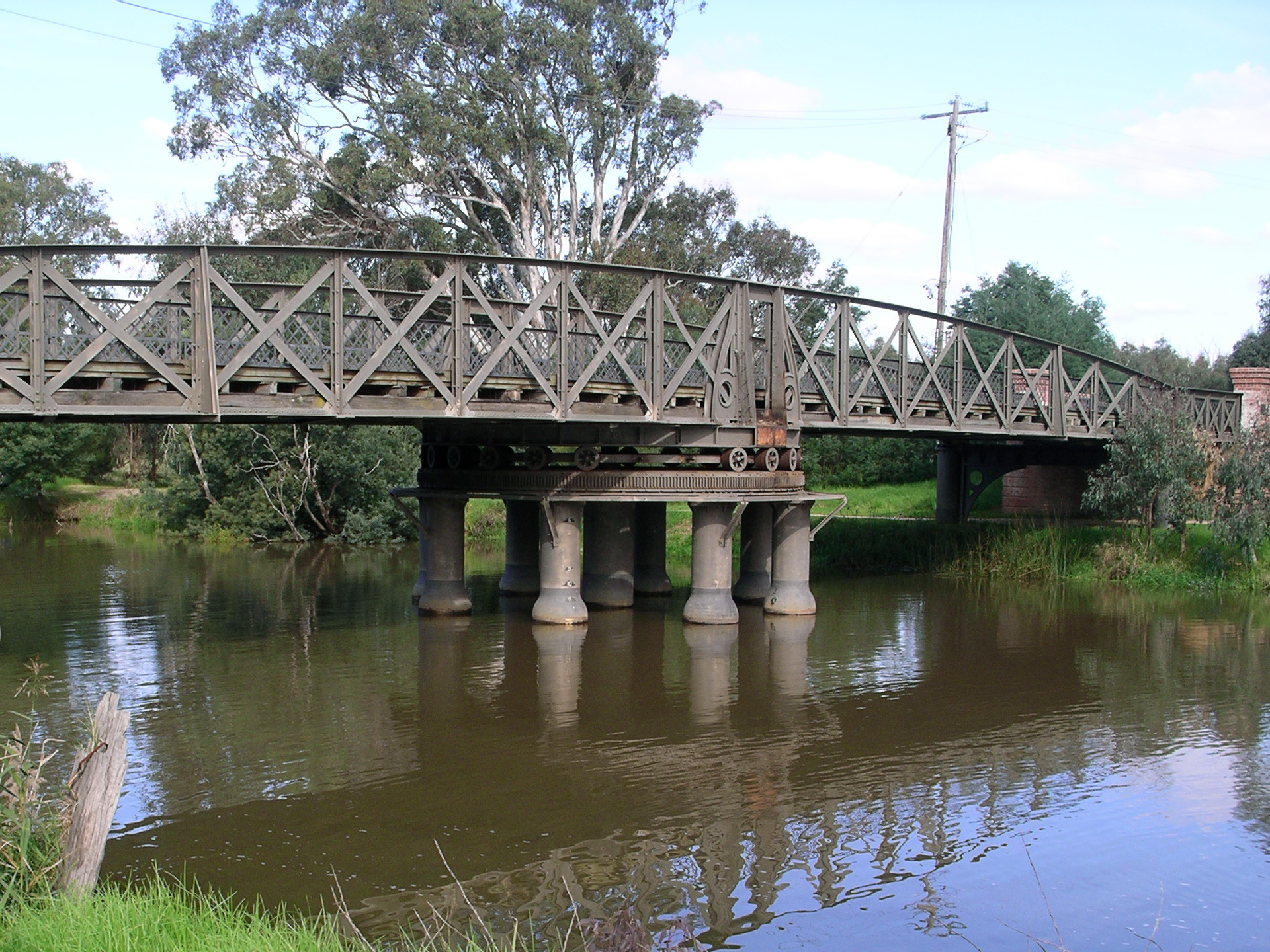
Historic Sale swing bridge over the Latrobe River

Sale has its own town bus network, adding two new routes to its existing 5 town bus routes on 1 February 2021. The routes make their way around the residential areas of Sale and some nearby small towns, linking residents to the Gippsland Shopping Centre or the Sale railway station, and are as follows:

- Route 1: Sale – Sale Hospital via Port of Sale (the 'south' route)
- Route 2: Sale – Gippsland Regional Sport Complex (the 'north' route)
- Route 3: Sale – Wurruk via Princes Highway (inter-town service)
- Route 4: Sale – Sale Station via Reeve St
- Route 5: Sale – Glebe Estate via Port of Sale
- Route 6: Sale – Glenhaven Park via Port of Sale
- Route 7: Sale – Loch Sport via Longford (inter-town service)
- Route 8: Sale – Stratford (inter-town service)

== Education ==
=== Schools ===
==== Primary ====
- Araluen Primary School (state, co-educational)
- Guthridge Primary School (state, co-educational)
- St Mary's Primary School (Catholic, co-educational)
- St Thomas' Primary School (Catholic, co-educational)
- Sale Primary School (state, co-educational)

==== Secondary ====
- Catholic College Sale (Catholic, co-educational)
- Sale College (state, co-educational)

==== Combined primary and secondary ====
- Gippsland Grammar School (independent, co-educational)

=== Tertiary education ===
A brand new major TAFE campus has also been completed in 2022 close to the CBD, built on the former old Sale netball courts. It offers tertiary training of apprenticeship trades and other industry training.

== Media ==
=== Newspapers ===
Sale's local newspaper is the Gippsland Times founded in 1861. Two issues are published each week; subscribers pay for only one issue per week. Its readership spans Wellington Shire, from north of Dargo to south of Port Albert, and to the west of Rosedale and east of Munro. The paper is part of the Fairfax Rural Media network of newspapers.

=== Television ===
The area was the first in Australia to receive its own regional television station, GLV-10 Gippsland (now Network 10), when it launched on 9 December 1961.

Programs from the three main commercial television networks (Seven, Nine and 10) are all re-broadcast into Sale by their regional stations – Seven (AMV), WIN (VTV) and 10 (GLV). All broadcast from the Latrobe Valley transmitter at Mount Tassie. All the commercial stations are based in Traralgon and have local commercials placed on their broadcasts.

Local news is available on all three commercial networks:

- WIN broadcasts a half-hour WIN News bulletin each weeknight at 5:30pm, produced from studios in Wollongong.
- Network 10 and Seven broadcast short local news and weather updates throughout the day, produced and broadcast from Seven's Canberra studios and 10's Tasmanian studios.

Nine previously produced a local news bulletin branded Nine News Gippsland and later Nine News Local for a brief period between 2017 and 2021 that aired on the Southern Cross Austereo primary channel when it was previously affiliated with Nine.

Both national public broadcasters, ABC (ABC TV) and SBS (SBS TV) are broadcast into the Latrobe Valley as well, via Mount Tassie.

Additional digital multi-channels broadcast by all the networks in addition to the ones listed above are available on the digital service called Freeview to viewers in Sale and the Gippsland/Latrobe Valley region. These channels include HD simulcasts of the primary channel (available on channels 20, 30, 50, 60 and 80). As well as ABC Family, ABC Entertains, ABC News, SBS2, SBS World Movies, SBS WorldWatch, SBS Food, 10 Drama, 10 Comedy, Nickelodeon, 7two, 7mate, 7flix, 7Bravo, 9Gem, 9Go!, 9Life and News24 Regional.

Subscription television service Foxtel (previously Austar until 2014) is available via satellite.

=== Radio ===
Traralgon based Ace Radio commercial stations — TRFM (99.5 MHz) and Gold 1242 both cover Sale. The Gold 1242 AM 1242 kHz transmitter is located in Myrtlebank between Maffra and Sale. Most ABC stations are rebroadcast locally as well as the local ABC Gippsland station (100.7 MHz / 828 kHz) that is based in Sale. Community radio station Life FM (103.9 MHz) is based in Sale. On 30 May 2009 the ABC's national network Triple J held their annual One Night Stand concert in Sale. 12,000 people attended the event at the Sale Football Ground.

== Notable people ==
=== Arts ===
- Mary Grant Bruce, Children's Author
- Henrietta Maria Gulliver, Artist, florist and landscape designer
- Emma Holland, Comedienne
- Laura Jean McKay, author
- Annemieke Mein, Dutch-born Australian textile artist
- Danny Spencer, Musician

=== Sport ===
- Shane Birss, former Australian rules footballer with St Kilda Football Club and Western Bulldogs
- Travis Birt, cricketer for Tasmania and Australia
- Rhys Carter, basketballer
- Ashley Delaney, Olympic swimmer
- Rob Foster, former Australian rules footballer with the Melbourne Football Club
- Pauline Frasca, Olympic rower
- Jason Gram, former Australian rules footballer with the St Kilda Football Club
- Dylan McLaren, former Australian rules footballer with the Brisbane Lions and the Carlton Football Club
- Alan Morrow, former Australian rules footballer with St Kilda Football Club and 1966 premiership winning player
- Scott Pendlebury, Australian rules footballer with the Collingwood Football Club
- Marcus Stergiopoulos, former soccer player with the Morwell Falcons, Lincoln City FC, Colombus Crew and South Melbourne.
- Norman Ware, former Australian rules footballer with the Footscray Football Club, Brownlow medalist, captain and team of the century

=== Politics ===
- Kevin Andrews, Liberal politician
- Darren Chester, Federal Member for Gippsland (National Party)
- Neil McInnes, State Member for Gippsland South 1973–1982, (National Party), (Liberal Party)
- Peter Ryan, former State leader of the Nationals

=== TV ===
- Wil Anderson, comedian
- Mark Howard, commentator
- Gregor Jordan, film director

== See also ==
- RAAF Base East Sale
