= Kate Just =

Australian artist (born 1974)

- Born: Hartford, Connecticut
- Known for: knitted artworks
- Website: https://www.katejust.com/

Kate Just (born 1974) is an American-born Australian feminist artist. Just is best known for her inventive and political use of knitting, both in sculptural and pictorial form. In addition to her solo practice, Just often works socially and collaboratively within communities to create large scale, public art projects that tackle significant social issues including sexual harassment and violence against women.

== Background and education ==
Kate Just was born in Hartford, Connecticut in 1974, but migrated to Melbourne, Australia in 1996. Just works in knitting, sculpture, ceramic media, and photography. She holds a PhD in sculpture from Monash University, a Master of Arts from RMIT University, and a Bachelor of Fine Arts in painting from the Victorian College of the Arts and a Bachelor of Science (Filmmaking) from Boston University. For her PhD research project, The Texture of her Skin, she was awarded the Mollie Hollman Doctoral Medal for the best PhD in Art Design and Architecture. Kate Just has been working as a Lecturer in Art at the Victorian College of the Arts Art since 2005.

Kate Just began knitting in 2000 following the tragic loss of her brother. As part of her grieving process, her mother taught her to knit. Just believes that knitting is a powerful personal, political, poetic and narrative tool and claims that her knitted artworks are autobiographical as they explore childhood and biographical experiences.

== Work ==
Just creates elaborate large-scale knitted sculptures and pictures, as well as works in resin, clay, collage and photo-based media. Just's work deals with feminist representations of the body. Her use of knitting in many of her works casts craft as a highly engaging and valid form of sculpture as well as a poetic or political tool.

In early elaborate knitted sculptures, Just became more focussed on crafting feminist representations of the body. She reinterpreted diverse mythical and historical representations of women including Greek myths of Daphne and Persephone, and the pink fountain from Heironymous Bosch's Garden of Earthly Delights in knitting to reflect personal and subjective experiences.

Just has created a number of socially engaged projects and public works in urban communities regarding violence against women. For example in the KNIT HOPE (2013), KNIT SAFE (2014) and FURIES (2015) works, Just worked with diverse groups of women from communities in the United Kingdom and Australia in which they knitted banners and photographic images challenging the ongoing issue of domestic violence and sexual harassment.

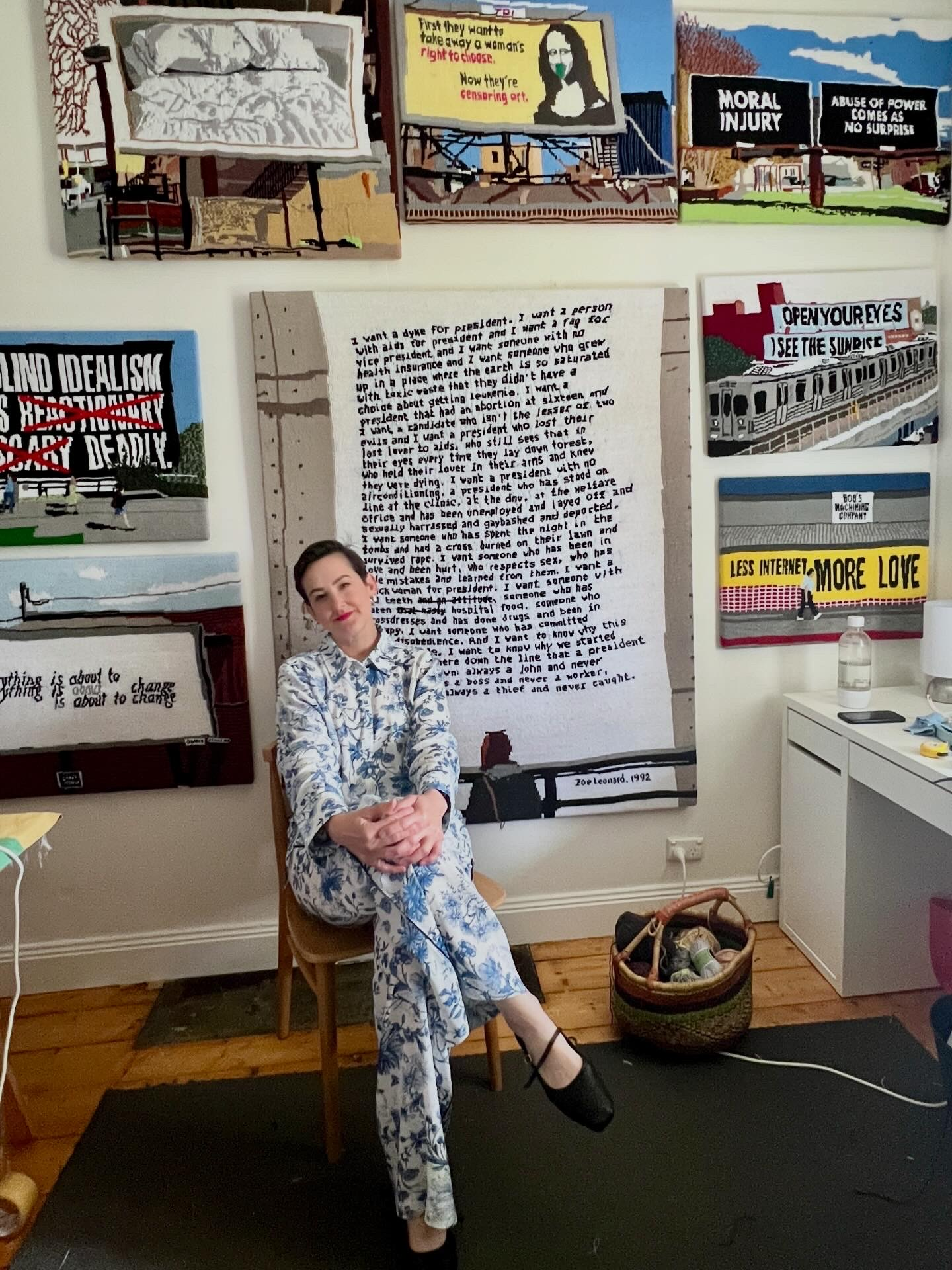
Kate Just and her artwork

From 2015-2017, Just created The Feminist Fan series, over forty hand knitted replicas of famous portraits of queer and feminist artists from around the globe including Sarah Lucas, Pussy Riot, Guerrilla Girls, Cindy Sherman, Lynda Benglis, Juliana Huxtable, Mithu Sen, Tracey Moffatt, Yoko Ono, Hannah Wilke, and others. This body of work was exhibited in a solo exhibition at AIR Gallery in New York in 2016 and a review by Betsy Greer was published in Hyperallergic. The artist writes about this work 'The title Feminist Fan emphasizes my reverence to these artists and feminism, and each carefully stitched picture, featuring over 10,000 stitches and 80 hours work, constitutes a time-intensive act of devotion. As a collection, Feminist Fan forms an intimate family portrait of feminism and of my own influences, in which threads of connection between artists across time periods and cultures emerge.'

Just's first museum presentation was 'Anonymous Was A Woman' at the Museum of Contemporary Art in Sydney as part of the National 2021. The work featured over 140 hand knitted panels bearing the same phrase 'Anonymous was a woman'. It refers to the quote by Virginia Woolf in a Room of One's Own. The project draws attention to the continued erasure of female artists from the canon of art history, but also speaks to ongoing issues of gender inequality faced by women around the world including unequal pay, undervalued domestic and care labour and continued threats of violence and sexual assault. During the exhibition at the MCA, Just held knitting circles and conversations about feminism in front of the work with members of the public, who joined her with their own craft projects or hand stitching.

Other solo bodies of art work include PROTEST SIGNS, which was shown at Hugo Michell Gallery in 2022, and featured hand knitted replicas of protest signs. Most recently, her exhibition SELF CARE ACTION SERIES at Linden New Art (2023) featured a large grid of 40 hand knitted text panels with self care prompts. SELF CARE ACTIONS SERIES explored the artist's year of grief after the loss of her father and the political relevance of self care to activists and artists.

=== Exhibitions ===
Just's work has been exhibited in over a hundred solo and group exhibitions in Australia, including Craft Victoria, Gertrude Contemporary, Centre for Contemporary Photography, Melbourne Art Fair, Contemporary Art Space of Tasmania, Perth Institute of Contemporary Art, and Canberra Contemporary Art Space. Internationally, her work has been exhibited in galleries in New York, Finland, China, Austria, Tokyo (Japan), New Delhi (India), New Zealand and in the US.

In 2018, Just's work was included in an exhibition of word art at Hugo Michell Gallery in Adelaide.

=== Collections ===
The banners Safe and Hope are in the collection of the Wangaratta Art Gallery, as a result of Just winning the Wangaratta Textile Prize in 2015.

Paradise, a life-sized knitted installation depicting a woman in a T-shirt and denim cut-off jeans, referencing the abduction of Persephone, is in the collection of the Ararat Gallery TAMA.

Kate Just's work is also in the collections of the National Gallery of Australia, the Art Gallery of South Australia, Artbank and the City of Port Phillip as well as in private collections in Australia, New Zealand, UK, USA and Austria.

== Awards ==
=== Shortlist ===
- Beleura National Works on Paper Prize (2010)
- The Woollahra Small Sculpture Prize (2009)
- The Blake Prize (2009)

=== Recipient ===
- Siemens-RMIT Fine Art Scholarship (2006)
- Mollie Hollman Doctoral Medal for the best PhD in Art Design and Architecture, Monash University (2013)
- Wangaratta Contemporary Textile Award (2015) awarded by the Wangaratta Art Gallery
- Asialink Residency, Sanskriti Kendra, New Delhi, India (2016)
- Red Gate Gallery, Beijing Residency (2018)
- Australian Fellowship Residency, Art OMI, New York (2019)
- The Incinerator Art For Social Change People’s Choice Award (for COVID-19 Global Quilt) with Tal Fitzpatrick (2020)
- Australia Council for The Arts Visual Art Fellowship (2022)

== Personal life ==
Just has been with her Australian wife since around 1994. Just met her partner in Australia when she was 20 years old and migrated permanently to Australia in 1996 at age 22. They have two children.
