= Annemieke Mein =

Australian artist (born 1944)

Annemieke Mein (born in 1944 at Haarlem) is a Dutch-born Australian textile artist who specialises in depicting wildlife. She was the first textile artist to be member of Wildlife Art Society of Australasia and the Australian Guild of Realist Artists. The subjects of her sculpted textiles are birds, frogs, gum and wattle blossoms, and insects such as moths, dragonflies, wasps and grasshoppers. Her fondness for insects and her sympathetic images, often greatly enlarged and showing normally invisible colours and textures, have revealed new aspects of the everyday world.

Mein was the only child of a father who was a dental technician and a mother who was a skilled dressmaker, and emigrated to Melbourne with her parents in 1951. Initially unable to speak English, she attended Brighton State School, Mitcham State School and Nunawading High School. She spent long days of her childhood roaming the outdoors and becoming fascinated by the extraordinary diversity of Australian wildlife. She sketched and collected insects, and learnt to breed and raise butterflies.

After finishing school she enrolled for a short-lived art course at Melbourne State College and then pursued a career in nursing at the Royal Melbourne Hospital, graduating in 1967. The following year she married Phillip Mein, a general practitioner she had met at the Hospital, and in 1971 they moved to Sale in Gippsland, Victoria with their six-month-old daughter, Joanne. Their son, Peter, was born in 1972. Her work became well-known and she was acclaimed as one of the world's foremost textile artists. In 1988 she received the Order of Australia Medal for services to the arts.

Mein holds regular workshops and freely imparts her techniques and experience to those who attend. She met Charles McCubbin (d. 2010), grandson of Frederick McCubbin, in 1979. He was one of Australia's leading naturalists and wildlife artists, and was chief consultant in the construction of the butterfly house at the Melbourne Zoo. He wrote and illustrated "Butterflies of Australia" and throughout their acquaintance shared his knowledge with Mein and gave his support.

In 1984 she was commissioned to design and produce six bas-relief bronzes for permanent display on a wall of fame in Sale. The bronzes featured Alfred William Howitt, Mary Grant Bruce, Ada Crossley, Allan McLean, Angus McMillan and Nehemiah Guthridge. In 1987 the town fathers of Bendigo commissioned a bas-relief of Henry Backhaus, the first priest to visit the Victorian goldfields. In 2007 Mein was the subject of a major survey exhibition at the Gippsland Art Gallery, which also holds a large number of her works in its permanent collection.

Her 1992 book The Art of Annemieke Mein, gives a rare insight into the creative process that is necessary for producing works of art that delight both the artist and the viewer. The illustrations offer a comprehensive cross-section of her textile pieces.

She suffers from cryptogenic sensory neuropathy, an autoimmune condition which has made it difficult for her to continue working.

In March 2024 Mein will be the subject of a major sixty-year retrospective exhibition called 'A Life's Work', to be staged at Gippsland Art Gallery in the regional town of Sale, Victoria, which will be accompanied by a new book about her art and life.

== Publications ==
Meins book The Art of Annemieke Mein Wildlife Artist in Textiles was first published in 1992 and has been reprinted numerous times with a new edition published in 2001.

- Annemieke Mein (1992). The Art of Annemieke Mein Wildlife Artist in Textiles. Search Press.
- Annemieke Mein (2001). The Art of Annemieke Mein Wildlife Artist in Textiles (New Ed edition). Search Press.
