= Tony Lloyd (artist) =

Australian artist (born 1970)

- Born: Anthony Lloyd; 1970 (age 55–56); Melbourne, Victoria, Australia
- Occupation: Contemporary artist
- Known for: Painter

Anthony Lloyd (born 1970) is an Australian contemporary artist.

== Early life and education ==
Lloyd was born in 1970 in Melbourne.

He acquired a master's degree in fine arts at RMIT University in 2000.

== Art practice ==
Lloyd's paintings are influenced by cinema, in particular film noir and science fiction, and the Romantic conception of the sublime. Lloyd's largely monochromatic paintings are realist in style.

His work depicts a wide range of subject matter from mountain landscapes to film noir vistas of highways at night. History and science fiction are recurring themes. In the December 2009 edition of Australian Art Collector, critic Ashley Crawford wrote, "Lloyd’s work clearly encapsulates a strange crossover between popular and high culture – there are times when his work finds the meeting point between Von Guerard and Von Daniken."

Curator Simon Gregg stated, "Often the works will speak of the future without implicitly describing anything that is futuristic. While at the same time the suggest a distant past, tinged with the faint melancholic wisp of nostalgia. Which heralds one of Lloyd's great contradictions and enduring points of interest: his works are insistently of the here and now – placing us squarely in the present moment of experience- but speak of time immemorial; of all time".

== Awards ==
Lloyd is the winner of the 2012 John Leslie Art Prize, a prestigious award for landscape painting for his painting, Expanded Sphere.

He has been a finalist for other awards, such as the Geelong Contemporary Art Prize, the Arthur Guy Prize at the Bendigo Art Gallery and the 2024 Hadley's Art Prize for landscape.

== Exhibitions ==
Lloyd's art has been showcased internationally in places such as Amsterdam, Hong Kong, Melbourne and London. Exhibitions include:

- Depth of Field at Shepparton Art Gallery and the Monash University Museum of Art (2003)
- Oneindige landschappen at Slot Zeist in The Netherlands (2004)
- Heat: Art and Climate Change at RMIT Gallery, Melbourne (2008) and Gippsland Art Gallery (2009)
- Lost Highways (2009), at Gippsland Art Gallery; a survey of the artist's work from 1998 to 2008
- High Plains Drift (2023), at Benalla Art Gallery; a survey of the artist's work from 2001 to 2023

== Collections ==
Lloyd's work is in the public collections of the State Library of Victoria and Gippsland Art Gallery, Sale.
