= 2008 NAB Cup =

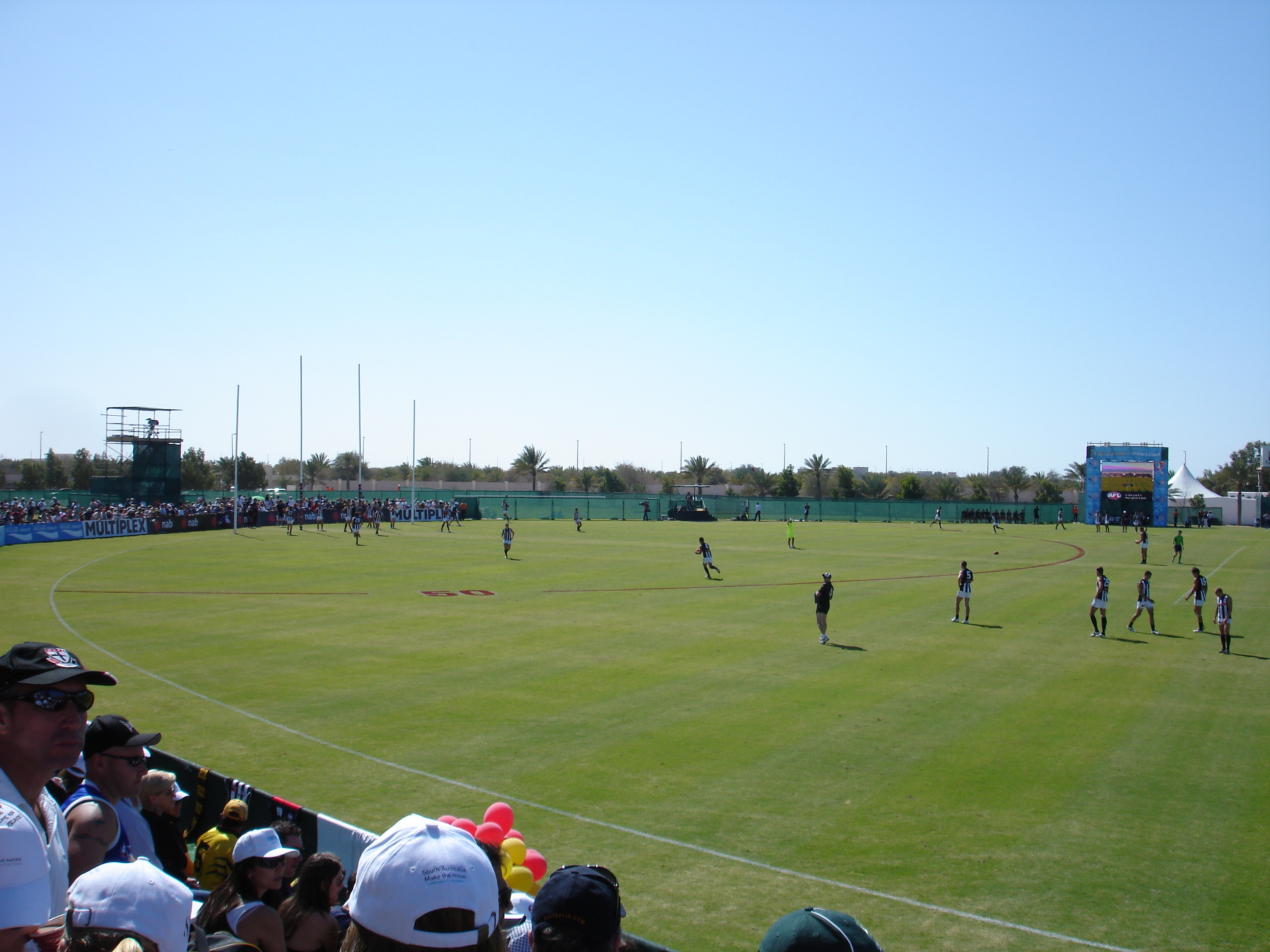
- Photo from the first-round 2008 NAB Cup match between Collingwood and Adelaide at Ghantoot Racing and Polo Club
- Season: 2008
- Teams: 16
- Winners: St Kilda (3rd title)
- Matches played: 15
- Attendance: 244,103 (average 16,274 per match)
- Michael Tuck Medallist: Jason Gram (St Kilda)

The 2008 NAB Cup was the Australian Football League pre-season competition played in its entirety before the Australian Football League's 2008 season began. It culminated with the Grand Final played on 8 March 2008 at AAMI Stadium in which St Kilda beat Adelaide by 5 points.

In their continuing attempt to grow Australian football internationally, the AFL played the opening game of the 2008 NAB Cup in Dubai, United Arab Emirates.

== Games ==
=== Round 1 ===
	Round 1
Saturday, 9 February (1:45pm GST, 8:45pm AEDT)	Collingwood 0.7.13 (55)	def. by	Adelaide 4.15.10 (136)	Ghantoot Racing and Polo Club, Dubai (crowd: 6,102)	Report
Friday, 15 February (7:40 pm)	St Kilda 1.15.12 (111)	def.	Richmond 2.7.11 (71)	Telstra Dome (crowd: 23,329)	Report
Friday, 15 February (7:40 pm)	Western Bulldogs 1.6.9 (54)	def.	North Melbourne 1.4.10 (43)	TIO Stadium (crowd: 8,256)	Report
Saturday, 16 February (3:40 pm)	Geelong 2.22.10 (160)	def.	Melbourne 1.12.8 (89)	Skilled Stadium (crowd: 15,000 est.)	Report
Saturday, 16 February (5:40 pm)	Port Adelaide 0.12.13 (85)	def. by	Carlton 1.13.13 (100)	AAMI Stadium (crowd: 9,133)	Report
Saturday, 16 February (7:40 pm)	Essendon 2.11.16 (100)	def.	Brisbane Lions 2.8.7 (73)	Gold Coast Stadium (crowd: 10,078)	Report
Sunday, 17 February (3:40 pm)	Hawthorn 3.2.13 (52)	def.	Sydney 0.7.8 (50)	Aurora Stadium (crowd: 14,778)	Report
Sunday, 17 February (6:40 pm)	Fremantle 2.12.14 (104)	def.	West Coast 1.7.9 (60)	Subiaco Oval (crowd: 32,502)	Report

=== Round 2 ===
	Round 2
Friday, 22 February (7:40 pm)	Western Bulldogs 0.8.11 (59)	def. by	Essendon 3.12.14 (113)	Telstra Dome (crowd: 19,831)	Report
Saturday, 23 February (3:40 pm)	St Kilda 3.9.10 (91)	def.	Geelong 3.8.11 (86)	Manuka Oval (crowd: 6,825)	Report
Saturday, 23 February (7:10 pm)	Hawthorn 4.9.13 (103)	def.	Carlton 4.3.15 (69)	Telstra Dome (crowd: 20,940)	Report
Sunday, 24 February (4:40 pm)	Adelaide 1.14.11 (104)	def.	Fremantle 1.12.6 (87)	AAMI Stadium (crowd: 10,394)	Report

=== Round 3 ===
	Round 2
Friday, 29 February (7:40 pm)	Essendon 1.12.10 (91)	def. by	St Kilda 1.12.13 (94)	Telstra Dome (crowd: 26,079)	Report
Saturday, 1 March (6:40 pm)	Adelaide 2.13.11 (107)	def.	Hawthorn 1.11.9 (84)	AAMI Stadium (crowd: 14,033)	Report

=== Grand Final ===
2008 NAB Cup Grand Final
Saturday, 8 March (6:50 pm)	Adelaide	def. by	St Kilda	AAMI Stadium (crowd: 26,823)	Report
0.1.4 (10); 0.2.9 (21); 0.6.10 (46); 0.9.10 (64)	Q1; Q2; Q3; Final	0.0.4 (4); 1.2.5 (26); 2.4.7 (49); 2.7.9 (69)	Umpires: Vozzo, Margetts, Rosebury; Michael Tuck Medal: Jason Gram (St Kilda); Television broadcast: Network 10
Super Goals	Schneider, Gram
Tippett 4, Burton 2, Douglas, Goodwin, van Berlo	Goals	Milne 3, Riewoldt 2, Koschitzke, Clarke
Johncock, Tippett, van Berlo Rutten, Porplyzia, Symes	Best	Gram, Schneider, Milne, Harvey, Luke Ball, King, Hayes
Nil	Injuries	Nil
Nil	Reports	Nil

== Results ==
Round 1
Western Bulldogs	54
North Melbourne	43
Essendon	100
Brisbane Lions	73
St Kilda	111
Richmond	71
Geelong	160
Melbourne	89
Hawthorn	52
Sydney	50
Port Adelaide	85
Carlton	100
Collingwood	55
Adelaide	136
Fremantle	104
West Coast	60

Round 2
Western Bulldogs	59
Essendon	113
St Kilda	91
Geelong	86
Hawthorn	103
Carlton	69
Adelaide	104
Fremantle	87

Round 3
Essendon	91
St Kilda	94
Adelaide	107
Hawthorn	84

Grand Final
Adelaide	64
St Kilda	69

== NAB Challenge ==
	Week 1
Friday, 22 February (4:30pm)	North Melbourne 13.7 (85)	def.	Brisbane Lions 7.11 (53)	MC Labour Park (crowd: 2,500 est.)
Friday, 22 February (7:30pm)	Richmond 14.10 (94)	def.	Melbourne 8.11 (59)	Cazaly's Stadium (crowd: 5,321)
Saturday, 23 February (4:00pm)	West Coast 14.15 (99)	def.	Collingwood 9.12 (66)	Collingwood Park, Albany) (crowd: 7,500 est.)
Saturday, 23 February (7:00pm)	Sydney 15.17 (107)	def.	Port Adelaide 5.8 (38)	ANZ Stadium (crowd: 1,500 est.)

	Week 2
Friday, 29 February (7:00pm)	Sydney 13.10 (88)	def. by	Richmond 17.11 (113)	Narrandera Sportsground, Narrandera (crowd: 8,296)
Friday, 29 February (7:00pm)	Melbourne 9.9 (63)	def. by	Western Bulldogs 14.9 (93)	Queen Elizabeth Oval, Bendigo (crowd: 7,000 est.)
Friday, 29 February (7:00pm)	West Coast 15.13 (103)	def.	Carlton 9.8 (62)	Traeger Park (crowd: 6,000 est.)
Friday, 29 February (7:40pm)	Brisbane Lions 7.10 (52)	def. by	Geelong 13.14 (92)	Gold Coast Stadium (crowd: 4,134)
Saturday, 1 March (2:00pm)	Collingwood 6.9 (45)	def. by	Port Adelaide 15.11 (101)	MC Labour Park (crowd: 2,500 est.)
Saturday, 1 March (6:40pm)	Fremantle 6.9 (45)	def. by	North Melbourne 12.10 (82)	Subiaco Oval (crowd: 5,614)
The match between Melbourne and Western Bulldogs in Bendigo was called off with 12 minutes still remaining due to power outage at the stadium.

	Week 3
Friday, 7 March (4:30pm)	Carlton 13.15 (93)	def.	Western Bulldogs 12.12 (84)	MC Labour Park (crowd: 10,137)
Friday, 7 March (4:30pm)	Geelong 23.11 (155)	def.	Richmond 12.5 (77)	Skilled Stadium (crowd: 10,000 est.)
Friday, 7 March (7:00pm)	Collingwood 16.12 (108)	def.	Hawthorn 13.12 (90)	Deakin Reserve, Shepparton (crowd: 9,500 est.)
Friday, 7 March (6:40pm)	West Coast 15.10 (100)	def.	Essendon 14.10 (94)	Subiaco Oval (crowd: 9,312)
Saturday, 8 March (1:00pm)	Sydney 13.9 (87)	def. by	Brisbane Lions 14.13 (97)	Manuka Oval (crowd: 2,264)
Saturday, 8 March (2:00pm)	Melbourne 14.10 (94)	def. by	North Melbourne 22.13 (145)	Casey Fields (crowd: 2,500 est.)
Saturday, 8 March (2:00pm)	Port Adelaide 16.15 (111)	def.	Fremantle 8.7 (55)	Hickinbotham Oval (crowd: 3,014)

== See also ==
- 2008 AFL season
