= Gippsland Art Gallery =

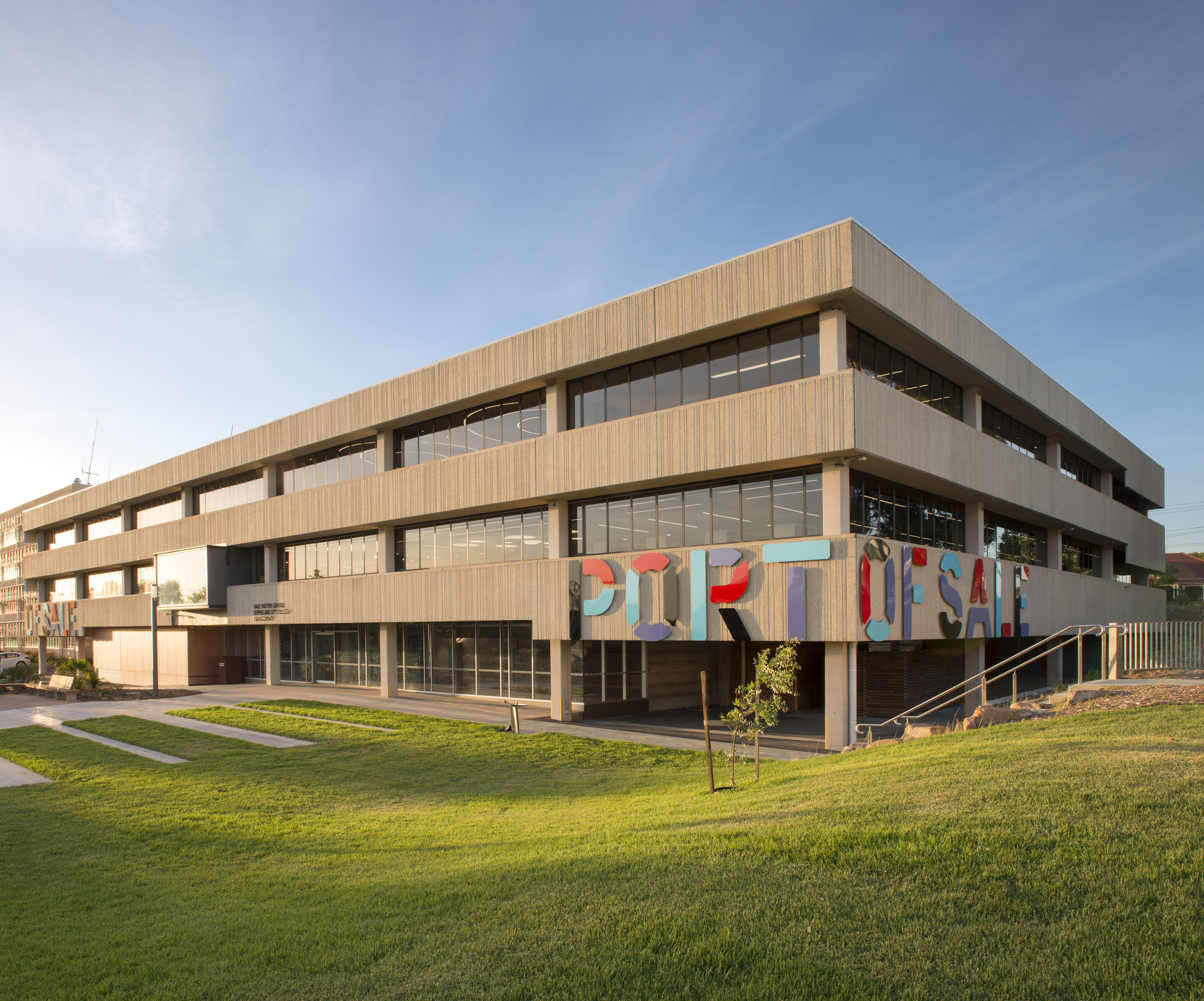
- External front façade of the Port of Sale building
- Established: 1965
- Location: 70 Foster Street, Sale, Victoria
- Coordinates: 38.1117°S 147.0635°E
- Type: Art gallery
- Director: Simon Gregg
- Website: http://www.gippslandartgallery.com

The Gippsland Art Gallery, formerly Sale Regional Art Centre, is a Victorian Regional Public Gallery based in Sale, 220 km (140 mi) east of Melbourne. The gallery is operated by the Shire of Wellington, and has a focus on the natural environment and artists based in Gippsland.

== History ==
The gallery was opened on 25 September 1965 by Rupert Hamer, as the Sale Regional Art Centre. It was built above the Sale Library at 82 Macalister Street, Sale. Construction of the gallery was funded by a state government grant of £20,000, with the Sale City Council contributing a further £10,000. An intensive program of temporary exhibitions was organised, complete with educational materials, and the institution soon became an important resource centre for schools, arts and crafts groups and the public, covering the whole area of Central and East Gippsland.

In 1989 the gallery was relocated after blue asbestos was found in the ceiling. It occupied several temporary locations before settling at 288 Raymond Street for some time.

In 1995 the gallery relocated to its current location at 70 Foster Street and changed its name to the Gippsland Art Gallery.

Between 2015 and 2017 the building underwent a major redevelopment to improve facilities and increase exhibition space. The new fit-out was designed by FJMT Architects, Melbourne, and opened to the public on 6 January 2018.

In 2018, the ExxonMobil Australia Collection of Australian Art, a significant collection of artworks spanning the breadth of the twentieth century, was donated to the gallery.

In 2020 the Gippsland Art Gallery Foundation was launched, a charitable fund to support acquisitions of major artworks and projects into the future.

=== Past exhibitions ===
The gallery has presented a number of significant exhibitions throughout its history. Important exhibitions include 'From Frederick McCubbin to Charles McCubbin' (2008), which explored the creative legacy of the McCubbin Family; 'Lost Highways' (2009), the first major survey exhibition of work by Melbourne artist Tony Lloyd; and 'Disappearers' (2009), which explored the absent figure in the work of eight contemporary Australian photographers. The Gallery has also presented major exhibitions of work by William Delafield Cook, Robbie Rowlands, Kylie Stillman, Sam Jinks, Charles McCubbin, Annemieke Mein, Jane Burton, and Bill Henson. In 2011 the Gallery presented the first ever comprehensive survey of work by Russian-born Swiss artist Nicholas Chevalier (1828–1902). The exhibition coincided with the release of a major publication by Curator Simon Gregg, which includes a detailed catalogue raisonne of Chevalier's Australian works. The exhibition later toured to Geelong Art Gallery.

In 2021 the Gallery hosted the prestigious Archibald Prize for portraiture.

== Governance and description ==
The gallery is operated by the Shire of Wellington. Its director since 2018 is Simon Gregg.

It is located at the Port of Sale, 70 Foster Street, Sale. It exhibits art of all media, styles and periods, but has a focus on the natural environment and artists based in Gippsland.

The gallery has six exhibition spaces over 800 m^{2} (8,600 sq ft), including a space dedicated to Sale-based textile artist Annemieke Mein, which rotates displays twice times annually.

== Permanent collection ==
Gippsland Art Gallery is home to a permanent collection of over 3,000 items, consisting of paintings, works on paper, ceramics, sculpture, textiles, woodwork and metalwork. The collection has a focus on the natural environment, and specifically Gippsland artists and Gippsland themes. The collection includes works by Pieter Bruegel the Elder, Jan Hendrik Scheltema, Portia Geach, Fred Williams, Peter Booth, Rodney Forbes, Victor Majzner, Rosemary Laing, Tony Lloyd, Polixeni Papapetrou, Annemieke Mein, Charles Rolando, Bill Henson, Ann Greenwood, Andrew Browne, and Sam Leach.

It is also home to the Esso Australia Collection of Australian Art, a significant collection of 20th century artworks.

== John Leslie Art Prize ==
The gallery hosts the biennial John Leslie Art Prize for landscape painting, which is presented every even year. The award is named after John Leslie OBE (1919—2016), former Patron of the gallery.

As of 2022 the main prize is a $20,000 acquisitive award, and there is also a $1,000 non-acquisitive prize for the "Best Gippsland Work".

Past winners have included:

- David Keeling (2000),
- Vera Möller (2002)
- Mark McCarthy (2004)
- Brigid Cole-Adams (2006)
- Andrew Mezei (2008)
- Jason Cordero (2010)
- Tony Lloyd (2012)
- Shannon Smiley (2014)
- Amelda Read-Forsythe with Under the Storm (2016)
- Vanessa Kelly with Wyatt Brothers Chicory Kiln, Corinella Gippsland (2018),
- Sarah Tomasetti with Kailash from the Air (2020)
- Greg Wood with V34 Reimagining (2022).
- Peter Gardiner with Elephant, 2024

== Publications ==
To mark its 50th birthday, in 2015 the Gallery published Hindsight: Gippsland Art Gallery History & Collections, 1965–2015. Written and compiled by Simon Gregg, the 446-page book chronicles the history of the Gallery, collection highlights, and a complete collection catalogue.

=== Past directors ===
Past directors are:

- Gwen Webb OAM (1976–1990)
- Giacomina Pradolin (1990–1991)
- Anthony Dahlitz (1992)
- Judy Miles (1993–1994)
- Michael Young (1994–2005)
- Anton Vardy (2005–2017)
