= Guthridge =

Guthridge is a surname. Notable people with the surname include:

- Bill Guthridge (1937–2015), American basketball player and coach
- George Guthridge (born 1948), American writer
- Joe Guthridge, American computer scientist
- John D. Guthridge (1912–1995), British film editor
- Nehemiah Guthridge (1808–1878), Australian businessman
- Richard Charles Guthridge (1837–1934), Australian merchant seaman and farmer

== See also ==
- Lake Guthridge, lake in Sale, Victoria, Australia
- Guthridge Nunataks, nunataks of Antarctica
- Guthridge, Missouri, a community in the United States
