= Lake Guthridge =

Reservoir in Victoria, Australia

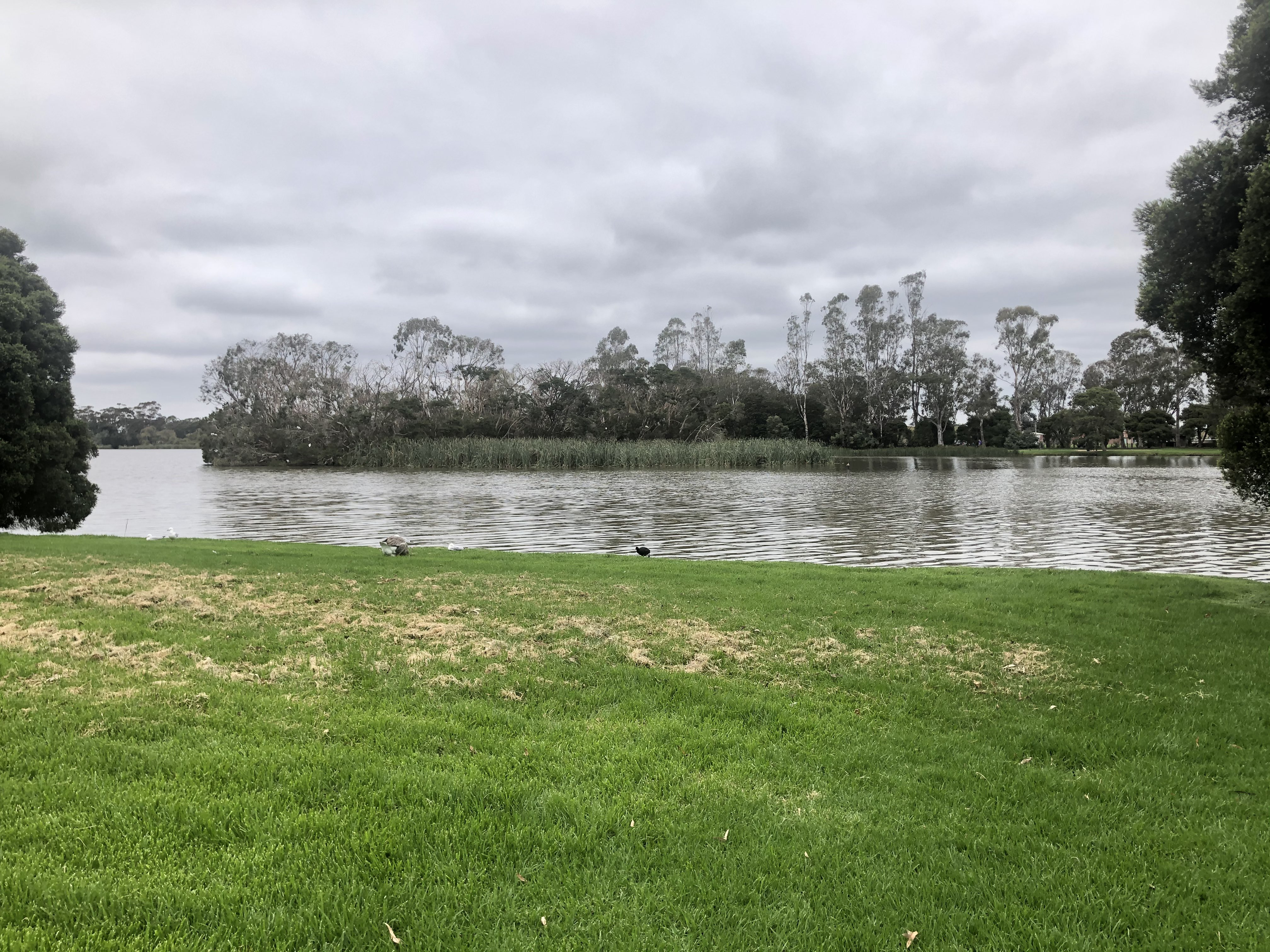
- The shores of the reservoir, 2021

- Location of the reservoir in Victoria
- Interactive map of Lake Guthridge
- Country: Australia
- Location: Sale, West Gippsland, Victoria
- Coordinates: 38°6′45″S 147°4′30″E
- Purpose: Irrigation
- Status: Operational
- Opening date: 1884 (as a reservoir)
- Owner: Wellington Shire Council

Dam and spillways
- Type of dam: Wetland (to c. 1880s); Urban reservoir (from 1884)
- Impounds: Urban run-off

Reservoir
- Creates: Lake Guthridge
- Total capacity: 325 ML (263 acre⋅ft)
- Surface area: 25 ha (62 acres)
- Maximum length: 850 m (2,790 ft)
- Maximum width: 400 m (1,300 ft)
- Maximum water depth: 2 m (6 ft 7 in)

Lake Guthridge is a small urban reservoir fed by stormwater, located in the town of Sale, in the West Gippsland region of Victoria, Australia. Originally a natural low-lying wetland used for drainage and sewerage discharges, during the 1880s it was impounded for the irrigation of green spaces in Sale.

Owned by the Wellington Shire Council, the reservoir is supplied by stormwater from a catchment area that comprises approximately 70% of Sale. It is located adjacent to Lake Guyatt, a small reservoir that acts as an overflow waterway, and the Sale Botanic Gardens are located on a 5-hectare (12-acre) site on the eastern shore of Lake Guthridge.

The reservoir was named in honour of Nehemiah Guthridge (c. 1808–1878), the first mayor of the Borough of Sale, in 1863.

== Reservoir overview ==
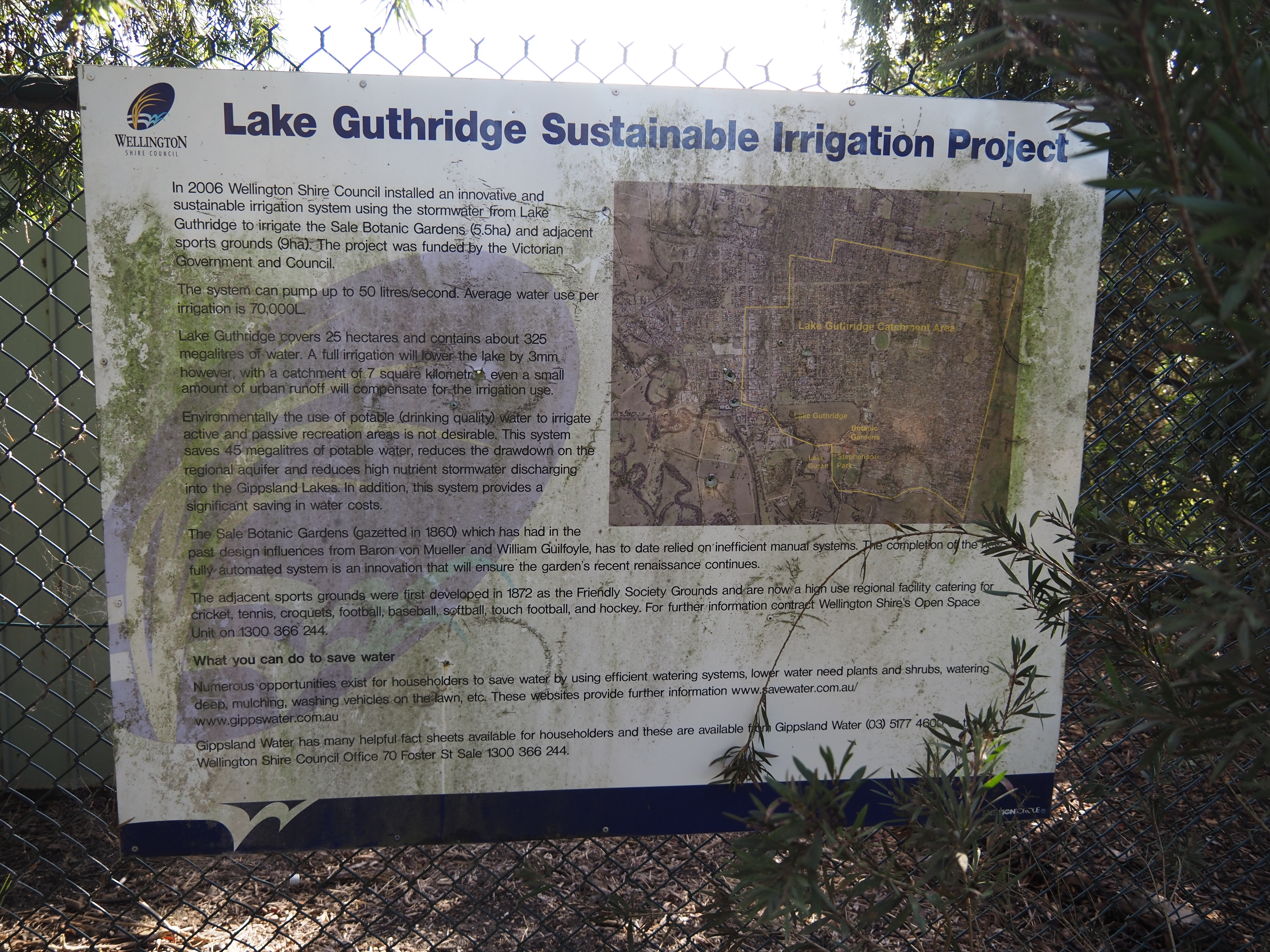
Sign at the reservoir, linking irrigation with the Sale Botanic Gardens

In 1850, the area of the lake on the south side of Sale was a low-lying wetland, and had been used for drainage and sewerage discharges. In 1874, the Minister of Lands offered support for the idea of converting the lagoon between York Street and the Sale Botanic Gardens into an ornamental lake. The wetland area was developed into a reservoir in 1884.

There is a 2.37-kilometre-long (1.47 mi) accessible walking track around the perimeter of the lake. The area is known as a bird-watching site, where diverse native and migratory species can be seen. Royal spoonbills were recorded breeding around the lake in 2016 and 2019, joined by yellow-billed spoonbills and Australian white ibis in 2020.

As part of an initiative to provide recreational fishing opportunities, the lake was stocked with rainbow trout of a size that is "ready to catch"; and with Australian bass fingerlings.

Grey-headed flying foxes roost around the shores of the reservoir and Lake Guyatt, since c. 2014. The large size of the colony may be due to the loss of suitable habitat in Eastern Victoria following bush fires.

The Lake Wellington Yacht Club has operated an accessible sailing programme known as Sailability on Lake Guthridge since 2000. In 2003, the Wellington Shire Council constructed a jetty at the lake to improve access to the sailing dinghies for those with a disability.

In 2018, blue-green algal blooms appeared on the lake, temporarily making it unsafe for water-based recreation.

== See also ==
- List of reservoirs and dams in Victoria
