= Robbie Rowlands =

Australian visual artist

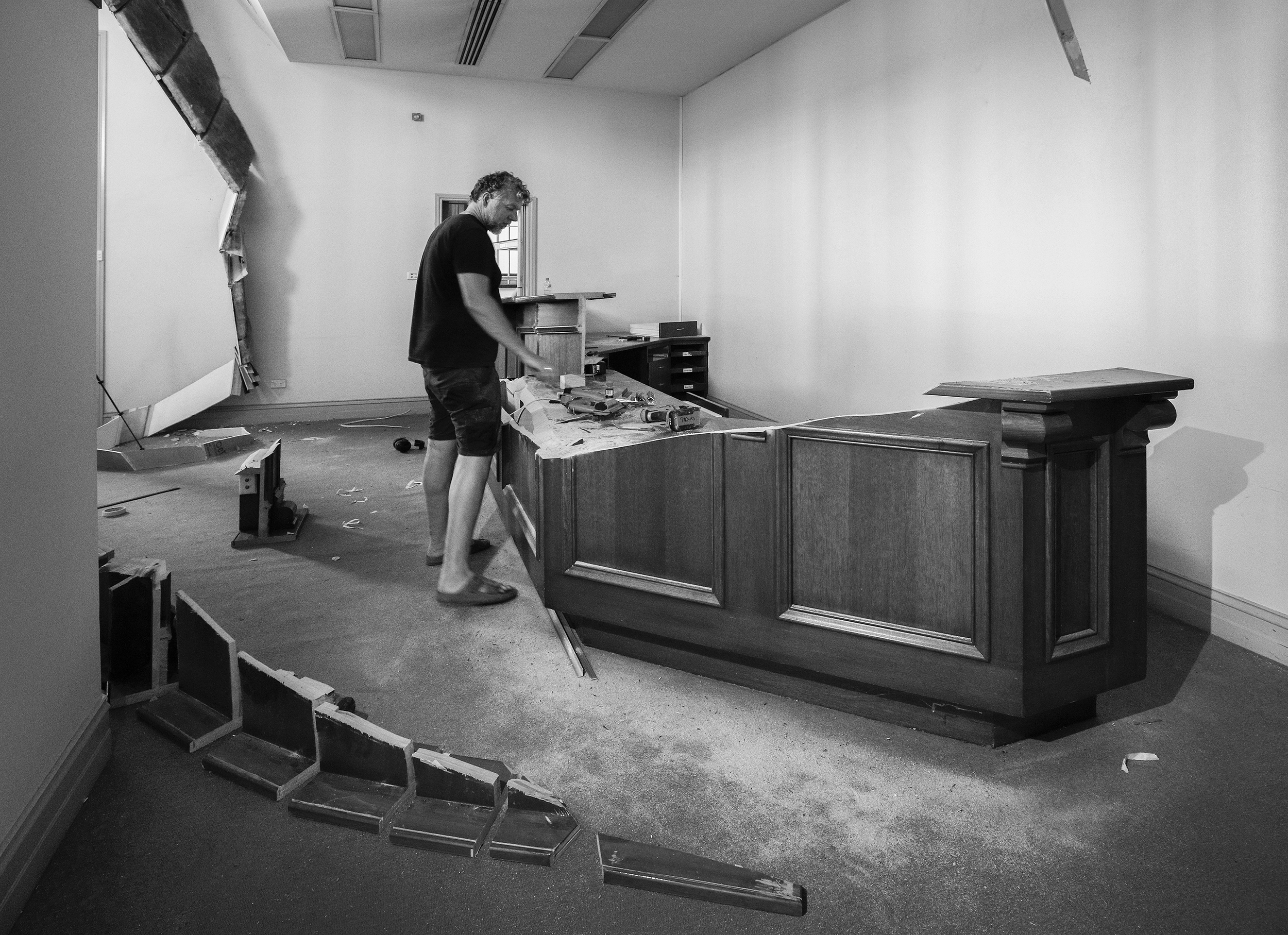
Robbie Rowlands' site intervention at the decommissioned Union Bank in Ballarat Australia

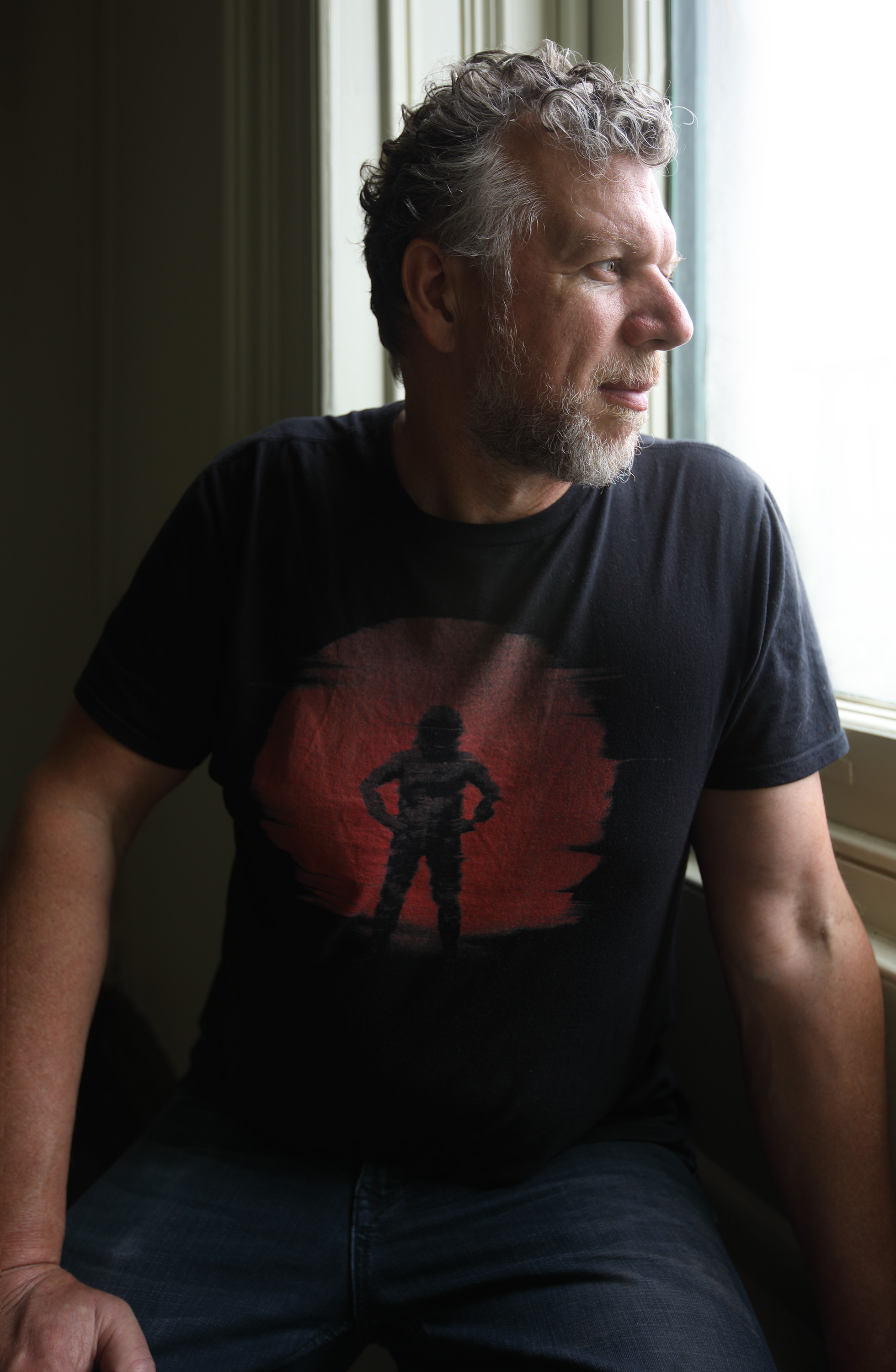

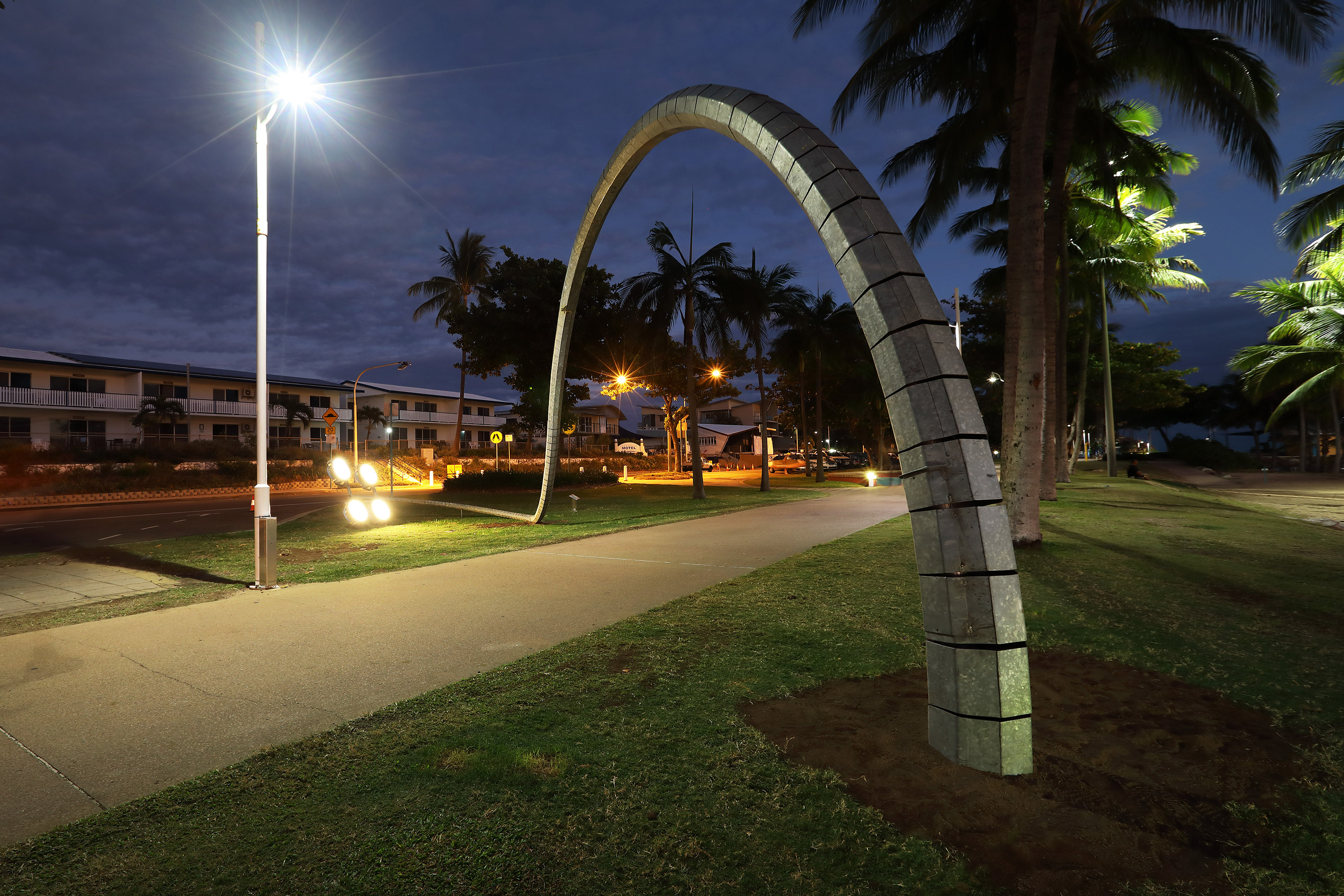
Light Falls, Reconfigured Light Pole, The Strand, Townsville, Australia, 2017

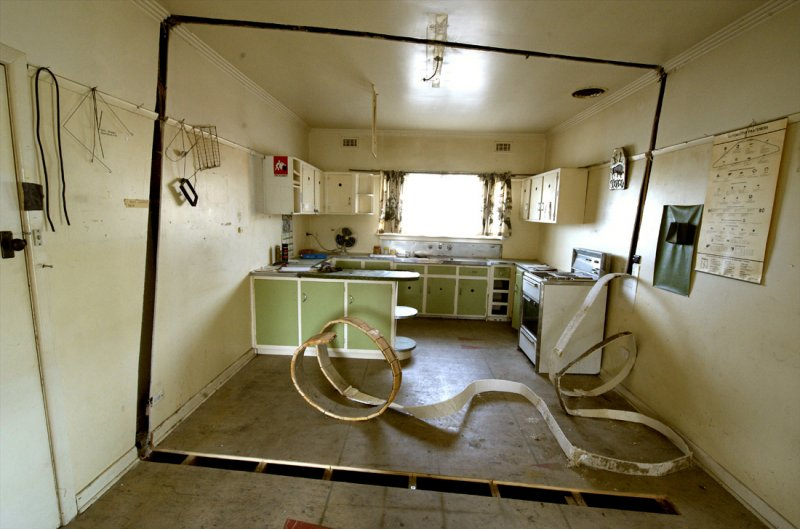
Robbie Rowlands, The Upholsterer, Grenda's Bus Depot Art Intervention, Dandenong, Australia 2008

Robbie Rowlands (born 1968) is a visual artist based in Melbourne, Australia. His work explores notions of stability and vulnerability through the manipulation of objects and environments. His repetitious and precise cuts and the resulting distortions reflect the inescapable passing of time that affects everything around us. Rowlands' works have been described as spotlighting the history, humanity and function of his subjects. His manipulated objects and spaces blur the boundaries between our fabricated world and the natural world.

He is best known for his sculptural interventions into pre-demolition buildings through to utilitarian objects such as urban street poles. Whilst studying at Pratt Institute in 1998 under the guidance of Professor Marsha Pels he explored abandoned areas of Brooklyn creating object and site interventions. These initial explorations have grown a body of work that has explored sites such as a 1950s bus depot, a 1900s wooden Baptist church in Dandenong, Australia through to abandoned buildings in Detroit, USA.

Writer and curator Stuart Koop described the experience of Rowlands work as like removing "skin from a cadaver (or worse a living body) to show the bones – the underlying structure of nails, studs and noggins, insulation, dust, plaster…he attempts no repair, leaving a gaping incision to frame the view of the buildings prone internal structure. He exposes the integrity of tools and fixtures too by severing the key structural member in each case; one side of an A-frame ladder, the bed-frame, the leg of a chair. He cuts that very tendon which keeps a thing straight, strong, effective so that, once cut, it seems to stagger and fall".

In an interview with Beautiful/Decay magazine he states "the site interventions ....were a necessary progression from my found object-based work. The challenge I had set myself in transforming an object through a process of cutting and segmenting was an interesting challenge with a building. There was a degree to which I could manipulate an object, pushing it to an edge until something new was realised whilst still retaining a sense of its original identity. The built environments had a similar if not greater challenge in considering what action was necessary without overpowering the space and appearing like an incomplete demolition.With the first few cuts I did I really couldn't judge their success and importance to my practice. It took time to realise that revealing these sub-surfaces and the subsequent reacting gesture of the material challenged my understanding of our built environments. There seemed to be a more defined explanation to the different feelings I have within certain spaces. The exposing of underlying tensions. The consideration that a space has a kind of memory or story.

Most recent examples of Rowlands' work includes Crossing the Floor, Broadmeadows Town Hall public art commission, (2017) Shadows Fall, Belfield House intervention, (2016) If this light can hold, Boulder Museum of Contemporary Art, Colorado USA (2015), Tread lightly for this ground may be hollow, Detroit, USA (2014); In-between, Wright farm Yuengroon, Victoria (2014); Merchant Cities, Substation Gallery, Newport (2014); Stem, Hazelhurst Gallery, NSW (2014). His works are widely documented in magazines, art journals, international design websites and in major sculptural publications including Highlife and Spacecraft 2 and Erratic by German-based Gestalten Publications.
