= Ararat Gallery TAMA =

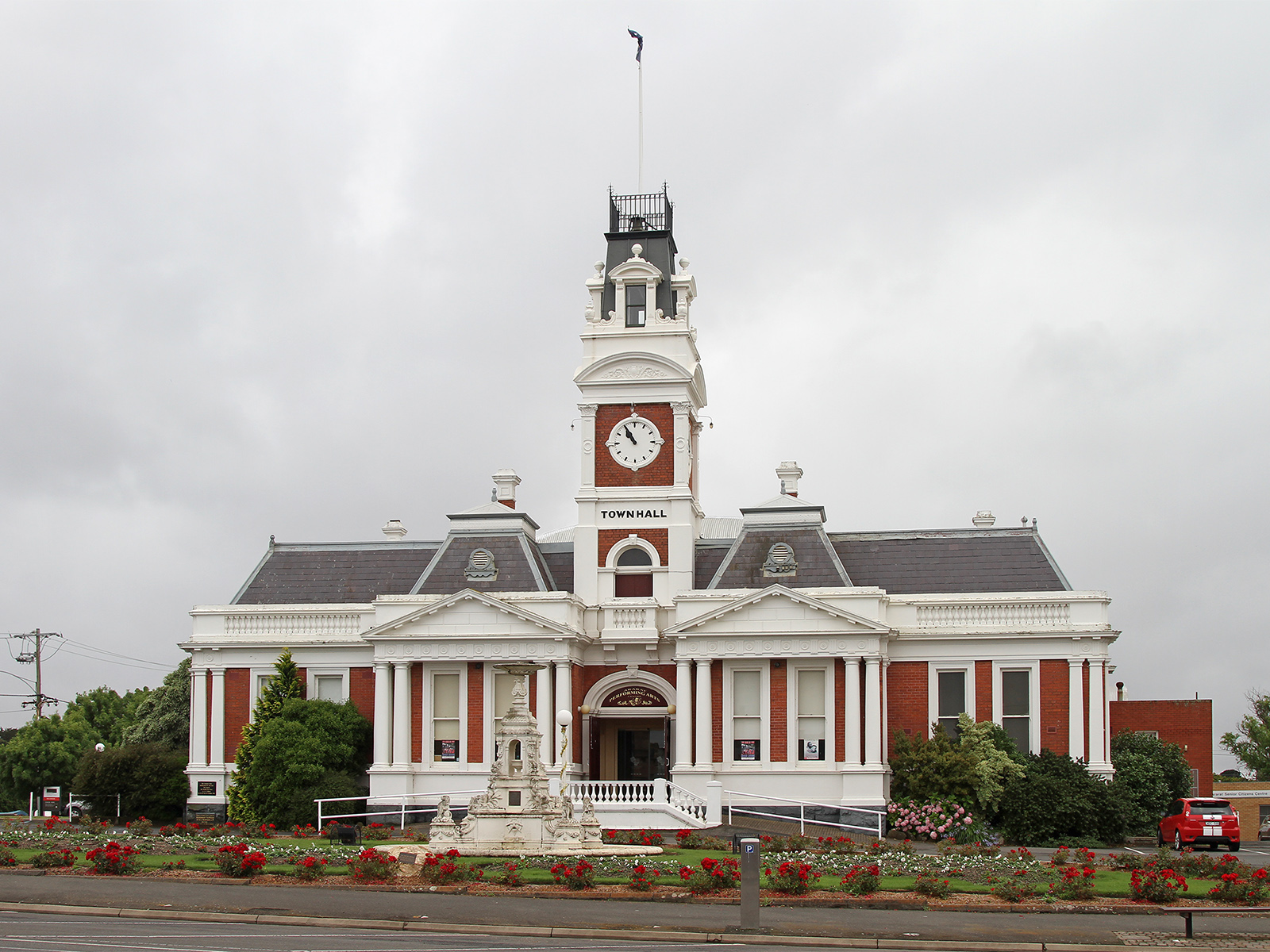
- Established: 1968
- Location: 82 Vincent St, Ararat VIC 3377
- Coordinates: 37°16′59″S 142°55′56″E
- Type: Art gallery
- Website: www.araratgallerytama.com.au

Ararat Gallery TAMA (Textile Art Museum Australia) is a public art gallery in the regional Victorian city of Ararat. Ararat Gallery TAMA is at the intersection of Vincent Street and the Western Highway, Ararat, in the historic late-Victorian Town Hall building. The permanent collection specialises in textile fibre art. The gallery is a member of the Public Galleries Association of Victoria.

== History ==
Ararat Gallery was established at a public meeting called by the Mayor of the City of Ararat, Councillor G Marx in March, 1968. At this meeting a small executive and a committee of six were elected. Ararat Shire Council made available the Old Municipal Offices in the Ararat Town Hall for use as a gallery. An initial establishment grant of $1000 was provided by the Victorian Government, which the gallery received annually until 1974, when an increased grant of $5700 was received. In 1971, a second room, the Old Council Chambers, was made available, thus doubling the gallery’s exhibition space.

Pamela Gullifer AM was appointed the gallery's first full-time director in 1973. In 1974 the gallery became the sixteenth member of the Regional Galleries Association of Victoria. The gallery’s textile and fibre art specialisation was established in the mid-1970s under Gullifer’s direction.

In 1978 Council received a $1M grant from the Victorian Government to restore and rebrand the Ararat Town Hall as the Ararat Arts Activity Centre. This project involved the restoration of the building’s exterior and a modified interior incorporating the gallery, performing arts centre and a new arts and crafts workshop. Through this project the gallery expanded and became a co-tenant in the building with the newly established Ararat Performing Arts Centre. The Ararat Arts Activity Centre was opened on Thursday 26 April 1979 with a welcome by Ararat Mayor Cr W C Henning, opening remarks by the Hon T Austin, Minister of Public Works, and closing remarks by Eric Westbrook, Director, Ministry for the Arts. Gunn Hayball Architects received the Victorian Architecture Medal in 1980 for their work on the project.

In the 1980s the gallery curated several touring exhibitions. The first four biennials (1981, 1983, 1985, 1987) were open only to textile miniatures, establishing in Australia a competition model that was well established in Europe. The miniature biennials attracted artists from Australia and overseas, resulting in many acquisitions. The last biennial in 1989 moved away from miniatures and focussing instead on critically engaged fibre art practice.

Ararat Gallery Inc. was liquidated in 2005, and the gallery became a facility of Ararat Rural City Council.

The gallery has an almost singular dedication to curating exhibitions which explore Australia’s recent historical fibre art history. Notable exhibitions include ‘About Time: Australian Studio Tapestry 1975–2005’ (touring to five galleries, 2010–2012)), ‘Douglas Fuchs – Floating Forest: 30th anniversary exhibition’ (2012), Kate Just: The Knitted Works’ (2013), ‘Making Time: The Art of John Corbett 1974–2013 (2013), and ‘Slipstitch’, curated by Dr Belinda von Mengerson and presented in partnership with NETS Victoria (touring to five galleries, 2015–2017).

Ararat Arts Precinct Redevelopment Project was completed in 2018. This $7.735 million project is funded by all tiers of government. The Victorian Government committed $5.2m to support the project, and the Australian Government has committed $945,000 through the National Stronger Regions program. A community campaign raised $232,000 through donations and fundraising, including significant donations from the Peggy and Leslie Cranbourne Foundation and from Rowly and Judy Paterson, local residents and owners of the ACE Radio Network.

Designed by architectural firm Williams Boag, the project has seen the Ararat Gallery’s existing spaces in the Ararat Town Hall enhanced and expanded. In addition, a new prominent entry and foyer will integrate an arts workshop space and improve its overall amenities, including through the addition of a café.

In August 2018, the gallery was renamed Ararat Gallery TAMA (Textile Art Museum Australia).
