= Jason Gram =

Australian rules footballer, born 1984

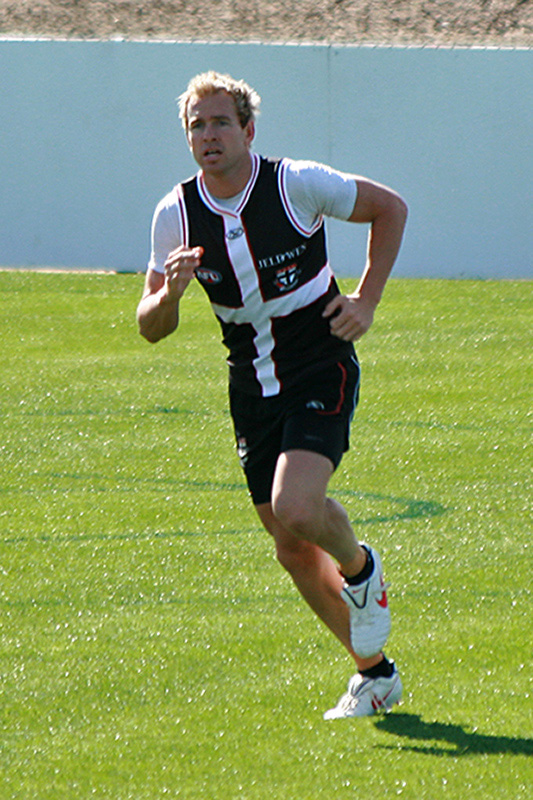

Personal information
- Full name: Jason Gram
- Born: 27 April 1984 (age 42); Victoria, Australia
- Original team: Gippsland Power (TAC Cup)
- Draft: 19, 2001 National Draft; Brisbane Lions
- Height: 186 cm (6 ft 1 in)
- Weight: 88 kg (194 lb)
- Position: Defender / Midfielder

Playing career^{1}
Years	Club	Games (Goals)
2002–2003	Brisbane Lions	2 (0)
2004–2012	St Kilda	154 (71)
Total		156 (71)
- ^{1} Playing statistics correct to the end of 2012.

Career highlights
- 2nd in St Kilda FC's Trevor Barker Award: 2006; St Kilda FC NAB Cup Premiership: 2008; Michael Tuck Medal in NAB Cup Grand Final: 2008; St Kilda FC Minor Premiership Team: 2009; St Kilda FC Grand Final Team: 2009; Equal 1st Norm Smith Medal in Grand Final: 2009; St Kilda FC Grand Final Team: 2010; St Kilda FC Life Member

Jason Gram (born 27 April 1984) is a former professional Australian rules footballer who previously played for the St Kilda Football Club in the Australian Football League (AFL).

== Junior Career ==
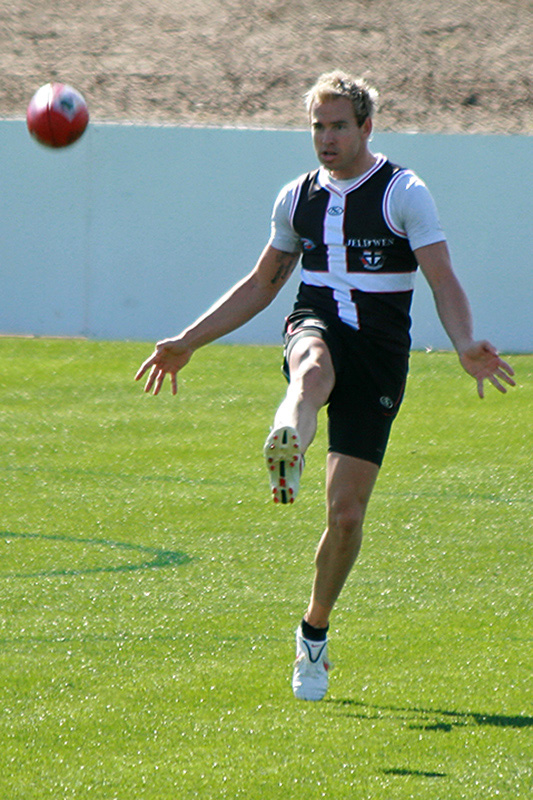
Gram at training prior to the 2009 AFL Grand Final

As a junior with Gippsland Power in the TAC Cup, Gram quit football for basketball with a view to making the elite level in that sport. It took one phone call from the Power coach of the day, dual Essendon premiership player Darren Bewick, to reverse his decision.

== AFL Career with Brisbane ==
Gram was drafted by the Brisbane Lions as the 19th pick in the 2001 AFL draft. But in two years, both of which culminated in Lions' premierships, Gram was chosen for only two games, amounting to 20 minutes of total playing time.

His last minutes as a Brisbane player would prove unforgettable for all the wrong reasons. His attempted clearance was smothered and led to a goal that lost the Lions the lead against Fremantle late in a game.

Gram cherished his brief moments of senior footy at Brisbane but was ready to go home, where he felt he would have more opportunities.

== AFL Career - St Kilda Football Club ==
Gram stated his preferred team to be traded to was St Kilda prior to the 2003 Trade period, the team he supported as a junior. He was traded from Brisbane in exchange for draft pick 23 in the National Draft.

=== 2004 First Season and Debut ===
Gram watched on as St Kilda FC won the 2004 Wizard Home Loans Cup to begin his first season at the Saints. He made his debut wearing the No. 15 guernsey for St Kilda in Round 15 of the 2004 AFL Premiership Season against Melbourne, gathering 11 disposals. He played a total of two games for the 2004 season. Gram played a further 5 games in 2005, his best performance being a 19 disposal effort against his former team the Brisbane Lions, in a match St Kilda FC won by a club record 139 points. He was overlooked for the Finals that followed, not playing when St Kilda FC secured what was effectively the ultimate success for the season in Adelaide in the 1st Qualifying Final.

Gram completed his first full season on the field as a player in 2006, playing in all of St Kilda's 23 matches in the 2006 Premiership season, including his first finals match in the 2006 2nd Elimination Final. He had the stereotype term "breakout season". Gram averaged 20.5 possessions per game in 2006, finishing second in the St Kilda Football Club Best & Fairest Trevor Barker Award. At the conclusion of the season it was announced that Gram had signed for a further two years. He accepted a change to the Number 1 guernsey from the retiring St Kilda legend Justin Peckett.

=== 2008: NAB Cup and Michael Tuck Medal ===
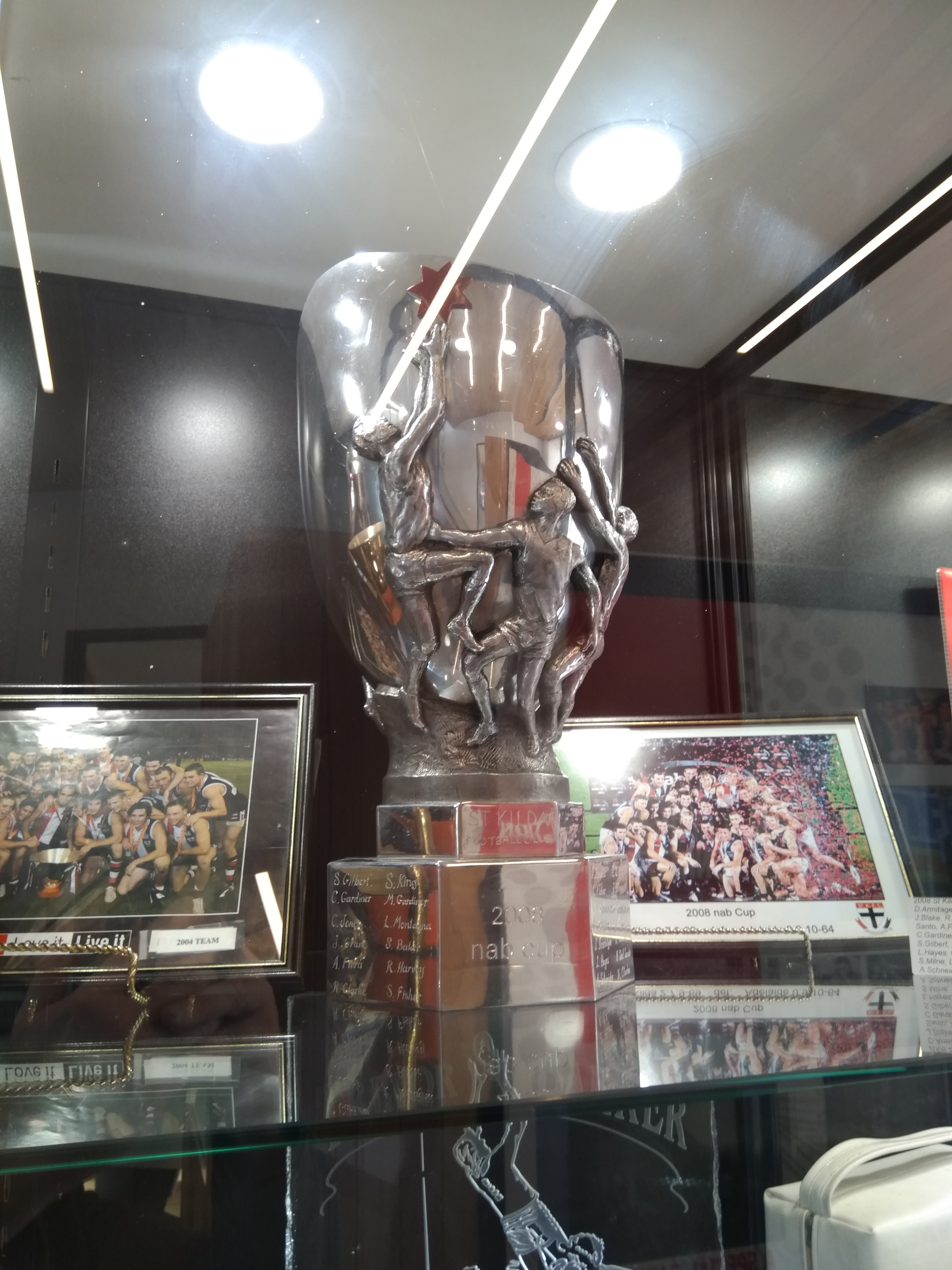
2008 NAB Cup at RSEA Park, Moorabbin

Gram's 2008 started brilliantly. He was awarded the Michael Tuck Medal for his best player on the ground performance during St Kilda FC's 2008 National Australia Bank Cup Premiership. Wins over Richmond, Geelong, Essendon and Adelaide saw the Saints win the tournament.

He played in all of St Kilda Football Clubs matches in the 2008 season – averaging 20.5 possessions per game in 25 matches including three finals matches.

=== 2009: Minor Premiership, Grand Final and Norm Smith Medal Controversy ===
Gram played in 21 of St Kilda FC's 22 matches in the 2009 season Home and Away rounds in which St Kilda dominated the competition, qualifying in first position for the 2009 finals, winning the AFL Minor Premiership McClelland Trophy. He averaged 23.9 possessions per game in the 2009 season.

St Kilda qualified for the 2009 AFL Grand Final after tough Qualifying and Preliminary finals wins over Collingwood and the Western Bulldogs. St Kilda were defeated in the 2009 AFL Grand Final by 12 points by Geelong. Gram was voted equal best player on the field in the 2009 Grand Final. He finished equal on votes in the Norm Smith Medal with Paul Chapman of Geelong, the first ever tie in award history. Chapman was publicly announced as winning the medal during the presentation. It was later publicised that Chapman had won the medal on the countback system, despite the fact that the AFL cancelled its countback system for ties in all awards in 1980, which had immediately affected awards such as the Brownlow Medal and McClelland Trophy. Players who were not declared equal winners of the Brownlow Medal under the countback system prior to it being cancelled were retrospectively declared a joint winner, and presented with a Medal. Chapman was initially publicly announced as being awarded the medal on the basis of a greater number of 3 votes from the voting panel compared to Gram, with Gram being the only player to have received votes from all five judges. Further investigation found that two Medals were released from the steward's office at the M.C.G on the day for the presentation, but only one presented.

At the end of the 2009 season, Gram had played in seven finals matches including one grand final and one pre-season cup final.

=== 2010 season ===
Gram played 18 games in 2010, a season in which he was hampered by injury, and averaged 21 possessions – including a career-high 35 possessions against Essendon in Round 18, followed by 34 possessions against North Melbourne in Round 20.

=== 2011 season ===
Gram played a total of 20 games in the 2011 season, including the elimination final loss to the Swans. Gram had a season-high, thirty-three disposal game against the Bombers in Round 3, which earned him a Brownlow vote. Gram gathered twenty or more disposals on fourteen occasions in season 2011. He kicked five goals for the season.

=== End of 2012: contract termination ===
In October 2012, Gram had his contract terminated prematurely by St Kilda after being arrested by police for breaching an intervention order placed by his then estranged wife Sarah.

== Career highlights ==
- 2nd in St Kilda FC's Trevor Barker Award: 2006
- St Kilda FC Michael Tuck Medal in NAB Cup Grand Final: 2008
- St Kilda FC NAB Cup Premiership: 2008
- St Kilda FC Minor Premiership Team: 2009
- St Kilda FC Grand Final Team: 2009
- Equal 1st Norm Smith Medal in Grand Final: 2009
- St Kilda FC Grand Final Team: 2010
