= 2010 All-Australian team =

Honorary grouping of Australian Football League players

The 2010 All-Australian team represents the best performed Australian Football League (AFL) players during the 2010 season. It was announced on 13 September as a complete Australian rules football team of 22 players. An initial squad of 40 players was previously announced on 30 August. The team is honorary and does not play any games.

== Selection panel ==
The selection panel for the 2010 All-Australian team consisted of chairman Andrew Demetriou, Adrian Anderson, Kevin Bartlett, Gerard Healy, James Hird, Glen Jakovich, Mark Ricciuto and Robert Walls. Healy and Walls both announced their retirement from the panel and therefore the 2010 season was their last as selectors. It was also Hird's last season as a selector, as he became coach of Essendon in 2011.

== Team ==
=== Initial squad ===
A squad of 40 players was selected on 30 August. There was a change from the tradition of previous years and instead of players being selected by position, the selectors simply chose who they considered to be the 40 best performers for the season. The top four sides provided half of the 40 players. Geelong had the most players selected of any side, with seven, while minor premiers Collingwood had five and the third and fourth-placed finishers, St Kilda and the Western Bulldogs, both had four players selected respectively. Adelaide, the Brisbane Lions and Port Adelaide did not have any players nominated for the squad. 18 players in the 40-man squad had not been selected in the All-Australian team before. Eight players who had been selected in the 2009 team did not make the 2010 squad, including 2009 captain Nick Riewoldt, Matthew Scarlett, Nick Maxwell, Simon Goodwin, Brendan Fevola, Leon Davis, Jonathan Brown and Craig Bolton.

Club	Total	Player(s)
Adelaide	0	
Brisbane Lions	0	
Carlton	1	Chris Judd
Collingwood	5	Alan Didak, Darren Jolly, Harry O'Brien, Scott Pendlebury, Dane Swan
Essendon	2	Dustin Fletcher, Jobe Watson
Fremantle	3	David Mundy, Matthew Pavlich, Aaron Sandilands
Geelong	7	Gary Ablett Jr., Paul Chapman, Corey Enright, Steve Johnson, James Kelly, Joel Selwood, Harry Taylor
Hawthorn	2	Lance Franklin, Luke Hodge
Melbourne	3	James Frawley, Brad Green, Mark Jamar
North Melbourne	3	Brent Harvey, Brady Rawlings, Andrew Swallow
Port Adelaide	0	
Richmond	2	Brett Deledio, Jack Riewoldt
St Kilda	4	Nick Dal Santo, Brendon Goddard, Lenny Hayes, Leigh Montagna
Sydney	3	Adam Goodes, Nick Malceski, Shane Mumford
West Coast	1	Mark LeCras
Western Bulldogs	4	Matthew Boyd, Adam Cooney, Barry Hall, Brian Lake

=== Final team ===
The 2010 All-Australian team was announced on 13 September. Six of the 22 players were Geelong players, with four players coming from minor premiers Collingwood, while Hawthorn, Melbourne, St Kilda and the Western Bulldogs had two players each. Carlton, Fremantle, Richmond and West Coast all had a lone representative, which meant that Adelaide, the Brisbane Lions, Essendon, North Melbourne, Port Adelaide and Sydney were not represented in the final 22. Players to make the squad for the first time were Harry Taylor, Jack Riewoldt, Scott Pendlebury, Harry O'Brien, Mark LeCras, Mark Jamar and James Frawley. No current team captains were named on the field (Chris Judd, captain of Carlton, was named on the bench) and so the selectors named Hawthorn vice-captain Luke Hodge as the captain instead. 2009 Brownlow Medallist Gary Ablett Jr. was named vice-captain, although he was neither a captain or vice-captain at the time.

Of the 18 players from the squad of 40 who missed out, the non-selections of Fremantle's Matthew Pavlich, St Kilda's Lenny Hayes, Melbourne's Brad Green and 2008 Brownlow Medallist Adam Cooney were considered the most contentious. Hayes, in particular, was considered a surprise, with St Kilda teammate and All-Australian wingman Leigh Montagna saying: "I was very surprised Lenny wasn't in the team... I pencilled him in for a captain or vice-captain. It's a big shock." Pavlich's non-selection also raised some eyebrows, with many experts predicting that the Fremantle captain would be selected in what would have been his seventh All-Australian side.

2010 All-Australian team
B:	James Frawley (Melbourne)	Brian Lake (Western Bulldogs)	Corey Enright (Geelong)
HB:	Brendon Goddard (St Kilda)	Harry Taylor (Geelong)	Harry O'Brien (Collingwood)
C:	Leigh Montagna (St Kilda)	Luke Hodge (Hawthorn) (captain)	Joel Selwood (Geelong)
HF:	Alan Didak (Collingwood)	Lance Franklin (Hawthorn)	Paul Chapman (Geelong)
F:	Barry Hall (Western Bulldogs)	Jack Riewoldt (Richmond)	Mark LeCras (West Coast)
Foll:	Aaron Sandilands (Fremantle)	Dane Swan (Collingwood)	Gary Ablett Jr. (Geelong) (vice-captain)
Int:	Mark Jamar (Melbourne)	Steve Johnson (Geelong)	Chris Judd (Carlton)
Int:	Scott Pendlebury (Collingwood)		
Coach:	Michael Malthouse (Collingwood)		

Note: the position of coach in the All-Australian team is traditionally awarded to the coach of the premiership team.
