= Brendon Goddard =

Australian rules footballer (born 1985)

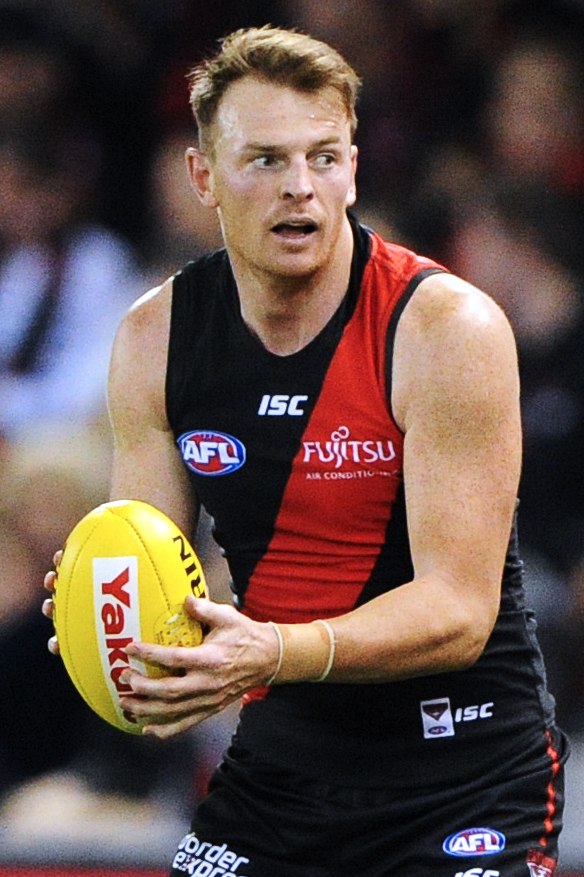
- Goddard playing for Essendon in April 2018

Personal information
- Full name: Brendon James Goddard
- Born: 20 May 1985 (age 41); Traralgon, Victoria
- Original team: Gippsland Power (TAC Cup)
- Draft: No. 1, 2002 national draft
- Height: 193 cm (6 ft 4 in)
- Weight: 94 kg (207 lb)
- Position: Midfielder / defender

Playing career^{1}
| Years | Club | Games (Goals) |
| 2003–2012 | St Kilda | 205 (104) |
| 2013–2018 | Essendon | 129 (56) |
| Total | | 334 (160) |

International team honours^{2}
| Years | Team | Games (Goals) |
| 2006–2017 | Australia | 6 (1) |
- ^{1} Playing statistics correct to the end of 2018.^{2} Representative statistics correct as of 2017.

Career highlights
- Essendon captain: 2016; W.S. Crichton Medal: 2013; 2× All-Australian team: 2009, 2010; 2× AFL pre-season premiership: 2004, 2008; Yiooken Award: 2014; AFL Rising Star nominee: 2003; Madden Medal: 2018

Brendon James Goddard (born 20 May 1985) is a former professional Australian rules footballer who played for St Kilda and Essendon in the Australian Football League (AFL). He played for the St Kilda Football Club from 2003 to 2012, then with Essendon from 2013 to 2018.

He was the captain of Essendon during the 2016 season. Since 2026, he has served as the head coach of St Kilda's reserves team in the Victorian Football League (VFL).

== Early life ==
Goddard was raised in Traralgon, Victoria, and later attended Caulfield Grammar School as a boarder. He was an accomplished sportsman, co-captaining the school's First XVIII football team and co-captaining the First XI cricket team as a batsman and pace bowler.

== AFL career ==
=== St Kilda: 2003–2012 ===
A lifelong Carlton supporter, it seemed destined that Goddard would fulfill his boyhood dream of playing for the Blues when Carlton finished last in the 2002 AFL season and indicated they would take Goddard with the first pick of the 2002 National Draft. However, an investigation into salary cap breaches stripped Carlton of the #1 pick, which was elevated to St Kilda, who ultimately took him. "It was pretty deflating, to be honest. But at that age you don't get a choice of where you go, so I was just grateful to get an opportunity anywhere."

He debuted in the following season while completing his Victorian Certificate of Education as a Year 12 student at Caulfield Grammar School. He played in the 2004 Wizard Home Loans Cup winning side – the club's second AFL pre-season competition win. After being selected with the number 1 pick, he received a lot of criticism in his early years.

During a round 7 clash against the Sydney Swans in 2007, Goddard ruptured his ACL after falling heavily onto it, which resulted in Goddard missing the remainder of the season.

He would return to play in round 3, 2008 and produced a solid form for the rest of the year. Despite interest from other clubs trying to recruit him, he signed a contract to stay with the Saints until 2010.

After a strong first few rounds of the 2009 season, Goddard was noted as one of the best players in the league and was seen as an early favourite for the Brownlow Medal.

Although generally considered a defender/midfielder, during a round 3 match against West Coast in 2009, he was positioned in the forward line and kicked four goals in the first quarter, the most he had ever kicked in a single game until that time. Although he didn't kick another goal for the game, he did gain 28 disposals in a best on field performance.

Goddard averaged 27.2 possessions per game in 24 matches in 2009 and was selected in the 2009 All-Australian Team and finished as the runner-up for the Trevor Barker Award. St Kilda finished first on the ladder after the home and away season and won their third minor premiership. They qualified for the 2009 AFL Grand Final, where they were defeated by the Geelong Cats by 12 points.

He averaged a career-high 28.7 possessions in 25 games (including four finals matches). He was voted in the All-Australian Team, finished third in the Trevor Barker Award and received 14 votes in the 2010 Brownlow Medal going into the night as the favourite to win. In the drawn 2010 AFL Grand Final, Goddard finished second in the voting for the Norm Smith Medal, with seven votes and his teammate Lenny Hayes won it with 13 votes. He is also remembered for taking a memorable high mark in the last quarter, and kicking a goal which put the Saints in front (before Collingwood came back to draw the game and defeat the Saints in the replay a week later). At the conclusion of the season, he signed on until the end of the 2012 season.

On 1 October 2012, Goddard signed with Essendon and became the first big name to use the AFL's new free-agency period which debuted in 2012. Goddard had refused to sign a new three-year deal all season and instead opted to sign with the Bombers, who offered him higher pay and a four-year contract. Goddard was formally offered the deal by Essendon at 11am on 1 October, with St Kilda allowed 72-hours in which to make a counter offer. However, the Saints decided by the end of the day that they were not willing to match the offer, therefore allowing Goddard to join the Bombers. In making a formal statement of the decision, St Kilda head of football, Chris Pelchen, stipulated that the club had made a significant offer to Goddard "that was relative to both his position and other players within the team. While we are disappointed at his decision to leave the Saints, we are absolutely committed to our ‘team first’ philosophy in relation to player contracts." St Kilda's senior coach, Scott Watters, further elaborated on the reasons St Kilda chose not to counter the Bombers' offer: "As far as the offer that was put forward to Brendon, it would've put him in the top two highest paid players at our football club", Watters said. "The reason (for Goddard leaving) is money. It's that simple." St Kilda was said to have offered "significantly more" than $500,000 a year to Goddard.

=== Essendon: 2013–2018 ===
He joined Essendon with aspirations of winning a premiership, but found himself walking into one of the biggest controversies in Australian sporting history. Goddard took on the responsibility of being a leader and speaking to the media where his new teammates were not allowed to speak.

Goddard's first season at Essendon was capped off when he won the first best-and-fairest award of his career. He played every game for the season, mainly through the midfield, averaging 26 disposals and kicking 18 goals, his best season tally since 2010. His leadership continued to be valued on and off the field, and his maturity and experience in big games proved invaluable to the young list.

In 2014, Goddard once again maintained his form on the field, whilst again being a voice for his teammates in the media. He was important in Essendon's loss to the North Melbourne Football Club and finished third in the W. S. Crichton Medal.

In January 2016, Goddard was named as Essendon's captain, replacing the suspended Jobe Watson. Mark Baguley was named as vice-captain.

In August 2018, Essendon opted not to offer Goddard a contract for the 2019 season, effectively ending Goddard's football career.

== Statistics ==
Legend
| G | Goals | K | Kicks | D | Disposals | T | Tackles |
| B | Behinds | H | Handballs | M | Marks |

| Season | Team | No. | Games | Totals | | | | | | | Averages (per game) | | | | | | | Votes |
| Season | Team | No. | Games | G | B | K | H | D | M | T | G | B | K | H | D | M | T | Votes |
|---|---|---|---|---|---|---|---|---|---|---|---|---|---|---|---|---|---|---|
| 2003 | St Kilda | 18 | 18 | 6 | 6 | 156 | 83 | 239 | 77 | 30 | 0.3 | 0.3 | 8.7 | 4.6 | 13.3 | 4.3 | 1.7 | 0 |
| 2004 | St Kilda | 18 | 24 | 4 | 4 | 174 | 128 | 302 | 109 | 48 | 0.2 | 0.2 | 7.3 | 5.3 | 12.6 | 4.5 | 2.0 | 3 |
| 2005 | St Kilda | 18 | 19 | 6 | 4 | 178 | 105 | 283 | 91 | 41 | 0.3 | 0.2 | 9.4 | 5.5 | 14.9 | 4.8 | 2.2 | 0 |
| 2006 | St Kilda | 18 | 22 | 10 | 9 | 321 | 156 | 477 | 177 | 71 | 0.5 | 0.4 | 14.6 | 7.1 | 21.7 | 8.1 | 3.2 | 6 |
| 2007 | St Kilda | 18 | 7 | 3 | 2 | 89 | 41 | 130 | 56 | 12 | 0.4 | 0.3 | 12.7 | 5.9 | 18.6 | 8.0 | 1.7 | 0 |
| 2008 | St Kilda | 18 | 23 | 11 | 4 | 337 | 200 | 537 | 182 | 47 | 0.5 | 0.2 | 14.7 | 8.7 | 23.4 | 7.9 | 2.0 | 6 |
| 2009 | St Kilda | 18 | 24 | 15 | 9 | 359 | 293 | 652 | 150 | 77 | 0.6 | 0.4 | 15.0 | 12.2 | 27.2 | 6.3 | 3.2 | 14 |
| 2010 | St Kilda | 18 | 25 | 24 | 9 | 367 | 351 | 718 | 172 | 88 | 1.0 | 0.4 | 14.7 | 14.0 | 28.7 | 6.9 | 3.5 | 14 |
| 2011 | St Kilda | 18 | 23 | 13 | 11 | 309 | 233 | 542 | 131 | 90 | 0.6 | 0.5 | 13.4 | 10.1 | 23.6 | 5.7 | 3.9 | 9 |
| 2012 | St Kilda | 18 | 20 | 12 | 13 | 300 | 187 | 487 | 121 | 60 | 0.6 | 0.7 | 15.0 | 9.4 | 24.4 | 6.1 | 3.0 | 4 |
| 2013 | Essendon | 9 | 22 | 18 | 5 | 347 | 227 | 574 | 151 | 73 | 0.8 | 0.2 | 15.8 | 10.3 | 26.1 | 6.9 | 3.3 | 9 |
| 2014 | Essendon | 9 | 20 | 17 | 18 | 282 | 181 | 463 | 133 | 51 | 0.9 | 0.9 | 14.1 | 9.1 | 23.2 | 6.7 | 2.6 | 9 |
| 2015 | Essendon | 9 | 22 | 10 | 7 | 278 | 303 | 581 | 131 | 78 | 0.5 | 0.3 | 12.6 | 13.8 | 26.4 | 6.0 | 3.6 | 2 |
| 2016 | Essendon | 9 | 20 | 3 | 7 | 256 | 262 | 518 | 117 | 73 | 0.2 | 0.4 | 12.8 | 13.1 | 25.9 | 5.9 | 3.7 | 0 |
| 2017 | Essendon | 9 | 23 | 5 | 3 | 309 | 304 | 613 | 168 | 73 | 0.2 | 0.1 | 13.4 | 13.2 | 26.7 | 7.3 | 3.2 | 0 |
| 2018 | Essendon | 9 | 22 | 3 | 2 | 239 | 251 | 490 | 137 | 37 | 0.1 | 0.1 | 10.9 | 11.4 | 22.3 | 6.2 | 1.7 | 1 |
| Career | | | 334 | 160 | 113 | 4301 | 3305 | 7606 | 2103 | 949 | 0.5 | 0.3 | 12.9 | 9.9 | 22.8 | 6.3 | 2.8 | 77 |

== Commercial partnerships ==
Two of Goddard's most prominent commercial partners include Kia and Nike.

== See also ==
- List of Caulfield Grammar School people
