= James Frawley (footballer) =

Australian rules footballer (born 1988)

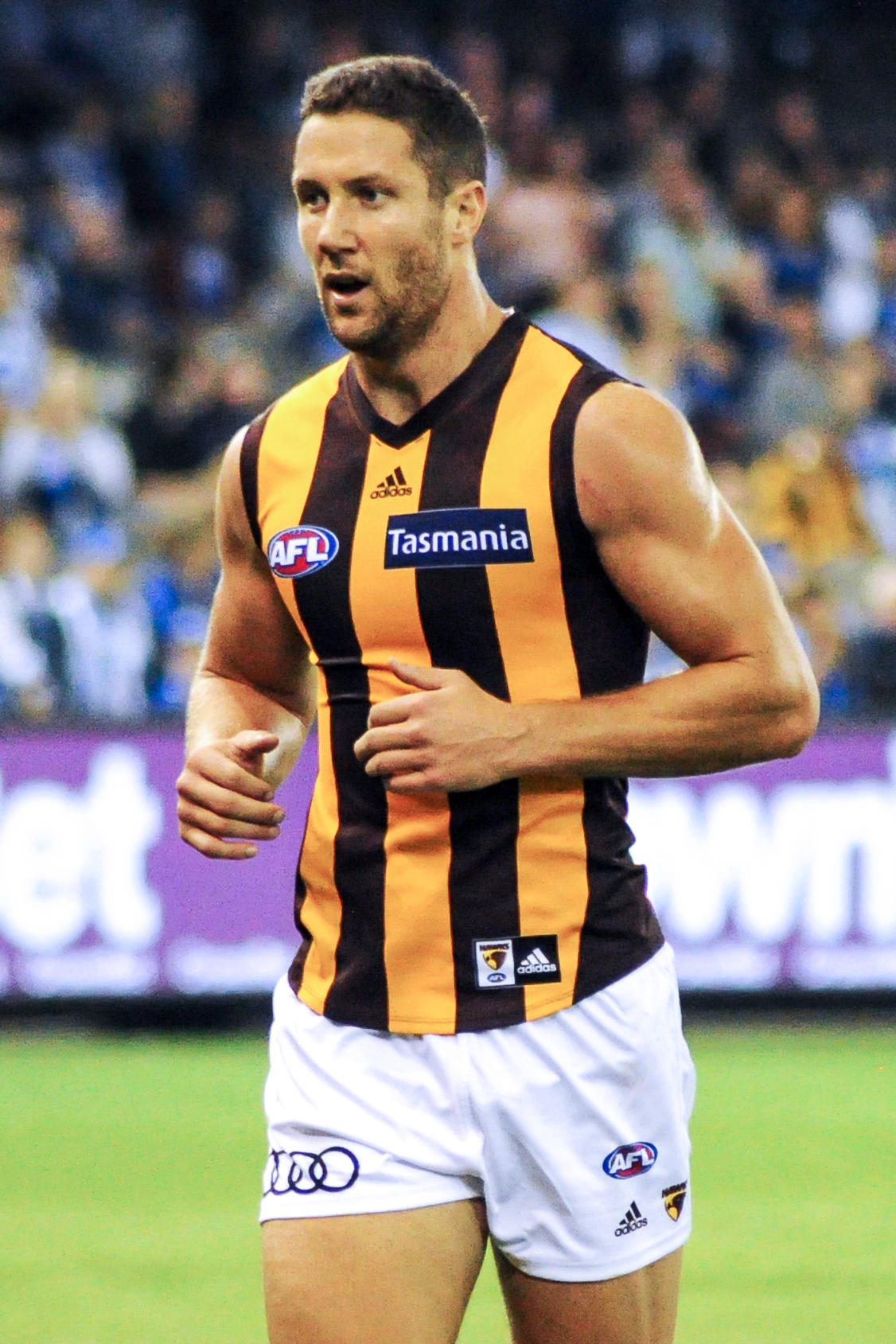
- Frawley playing for Hawthorn in April 2018

Personal information
- Full name: James Frawley
- Nickname: Chips
- Born: 20 September 1988 (age 38)
- Original team: North Ballarat Rebels
- Draft: No. 12, 2006 national draft
- Debut: Round 9, 2007, Melbourne vs. Kangaroos, at Melbourne Cricket Ground
- Height: 193 cm (6 ft 4 in)
- Weight: 94 kg (207 lb)
- Position: Defender

Club information
- Current club: Gold Coast reserves
- Number: 70

Playing career^{1}
Years	Club	Games (Goals)
2007–2014	Melbourne	139 (18)
2015–2020	Hawthorn	100 (6)
2021	St Kilda	2 (0)
Total		241 (24)

International team honours^{2}
Years	Team	Games (Goals)
2010–2011	Australia	2 (0)
- ^{1} Playing statistics correct to the end of 2021.^{2} Representative statistics correct as of 2011.

Career highlights
- AFL premiership player: 2015; All-Australian team: 2010

James Frawley (born 20 September 1988) is an Australian rules footballer who currently plays for the Gold Coast Suns in the Victorian Football League (VFL) and Palm Beach Currumbin in the Queensland Australian Football League (QAFL).

He previously played professionally with the Melbourne Football Club, Hawthorn Football Club and St Kilda Football Club in the Australian Football League (AFL).

== AFL career ==
While completing his final year at Damascus College Ballarat, Frawley was recruited from the North Ballarat Rebels in the TAC Cup following from his junior ranks at the East Ballarat Junior Football Netbal Club in the Ballarat Football Netball League. He was taken by the Melbourne Demons with their first round pick (12th overall) in the 2006 AFL draft. He is the nephew of a former St Kilda captain, Danny Frawley.

=== Melbourne (2007–2014) ===
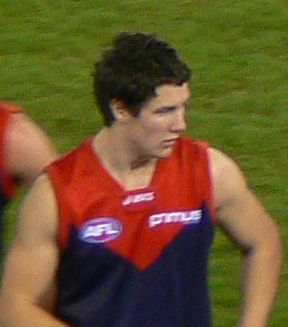
Frawley with Melbourne in 2007.

Frawley debuted for the Demons in Round 9, 2007 and played all of his games in defence. He played nine senior games in his first year of AFL football.

Not known for his kicking efficiency, Frawley had a tough and uncompromising defensive style of play.

The 2010 season was a breakout year for Frawley who, at still only 21 years of age, became one of the premier defenders in the league. His season was capped off by being named in the back pocket for the 2010 All-Australian squad and finishing second to Brad Green in Melbourne's Best and Fairest.

Coming off his breakthrough season in 2010, Frawley's 2011 season started with a setback as he was sidelined for up to three months after tearing his pectoral muscle in January.

In 2014, under the new coaching structure of Paul Roos, Frawley began to play more of a forward role. His defensive efforts inside Melbourne's forward 50 was a contributing factor towards their on-field improvement.

=== Hawthorn (2015–2020) ===
On 6 October 2014, Frawley exercised his rights as a free agent and joined the Hawthorn Football Club. He was to play under his eighth coach, three of which were caretaker coaches.

Frawley featured in the club's 2015 premiership winning team at the end of the season and played an instrumental role in the victory, keeping Coleman Medallist Josh Kennedy goalless for the entire match.

On 8 October 2020, Frawley retired from the AFL.

=== St Kilda (2021) ===
Frawley backflipped on his retirement and joined St Kilda as a delisted free agent on 26 November 2020. He had announced his retirement from the Hawks at the end of 2020 but was lured out of retirement and was eligible for selection as a delisted free agent following the first list lodgement on 25 November.

Frawley played in St Kilda's Community Series win against Carlton, but suffered a hamstring injury in the first quarter, resulting in him missing more than two months of football.

After two games for St Kilda, Frawley retired for the second time at the conclusion of the 2021 AFL season.

== Post-AFL career ==
In 2022, Frawley joined the Gold Coast Suns as a development coach, working with the club's Victorian Football League (VFL) team. However, he remained as a fill-in playing option, and made his debut for the Suns against North Melbourne in round 22 of the 2022 VFL season, recording 13 disposals.

In March 2023, he joined Palm Beach Currumbin in the Queensland Australian Football League (QAFL).

Frawley was named as an emergency against Carlton in round 9 of the 2024 VFL season. He played his second game for the Suns against Coburg in round 19, 2024, recording nine disposals in a 34-point victory.

== Statistics ==
Legend
G	Goals	K	Kicks	D	Disposals	T	Tackles
B	Behinds	H	Handballs	M	Marks

Season	Team	No.	Games	Totals							Averages (per game)							Votes
Season	Team	No.	Games	G	B	K	H	D	M	T	G	B	K	H	D	M	T	Votes
2007	Melbourne	8	9	0	0	35	32	67	21	15	0.0	0.0	3.9	3.6	7.4	2.3	1.7	0
2008	Melbourne	8	11	0	0	66	38	104	44	21	0.0	0.0	6.0	3.5	9.5	4.0	1.9	0
2009	Melbourne	8	20	1	1	154	124	278	89	38	0.1	0.1	7.7	6.2	13.9	4.5	1.9	0
2010	Melbourne	8	21	1	1	234	157	391	123	49	0.0	0.0	11.1	7.5	18.6	5.9	2.3	3
2011	Melbourne	8	21	1	1	238	154	392	109	32	0.0	0.0	11.3	7.3	18.7	5.2	1.5	2
2012	Melbourne	8	19	0	1	215	80	295	96	45	0.0	0.1	11.3	4.2	15.5	5.1	2.4	0
2013	Melbourne	8	17	0	1	165	86	251	97	34	0.0	0.1	9.7	5.1	14.8	5.7	2.0	0
2014	Melbourne	8	21	15	16	219	101	320	156	46	0.7	0.8	10.4	4.8	15.2	7.4	2.2	3
2015^{#}	Hawthorn	12	18	6	1	148	84	232	88	32	0.3	0.1	8.2	4.7	12.9	4.9	1.7	0
2016	Hawthorn	12	22	0	0	191	112	303	114	48	0.0	0.0	8.7	5.1	13.8	5.2	2.2	0
2017	Hawthorn	12	8	0	0	77	39	116	52	13	0.0	0.0	9.6	4.9	14.5	6.5	1.2	0
2018	Hawthorn	12	20	0	0	185	86	271	91	30	0.0	0.0	9.3	4.3	13.6	4.6	1.5	0
2019	Hawthorn	12	18	0	0	157	61	218	77	27	0.0	0.0	8.7	3.4	12.1	4.3	1.5	1
2020 (Note: The 2020 season was played with 17 home-and-away matches per team (down from 22) and 16-minute quarters with time on (down from 20-minute quarters with time on) due to the impact of the COVID-19 pandemic.)	Hawthorn	12	14	0	0	77	45	122	41	10	0.0	0.0	5.5	3.2	8.7	2.9	0.7	0
2021	St Kilda	24	2	0	0	13	10	23	10	2	0.0	0.0	6.5	5.0	11.5	5.0	1.0	0
Career			241	24	22	2174	1209	3383	1208	442	0.1	0.1	9.0	5.0	14.0	5.0	1.8	9

== Honours and achievements ==
Team

- AFL premiership player (Hawthorn): 2015
- Minor premiership (Box Hill): 2015

Individual

- All-Australian team: 2010
- 2× Australian international rules football team: 2010, 2011
