= Brian Lake =

Australian rules footballer, born 1982

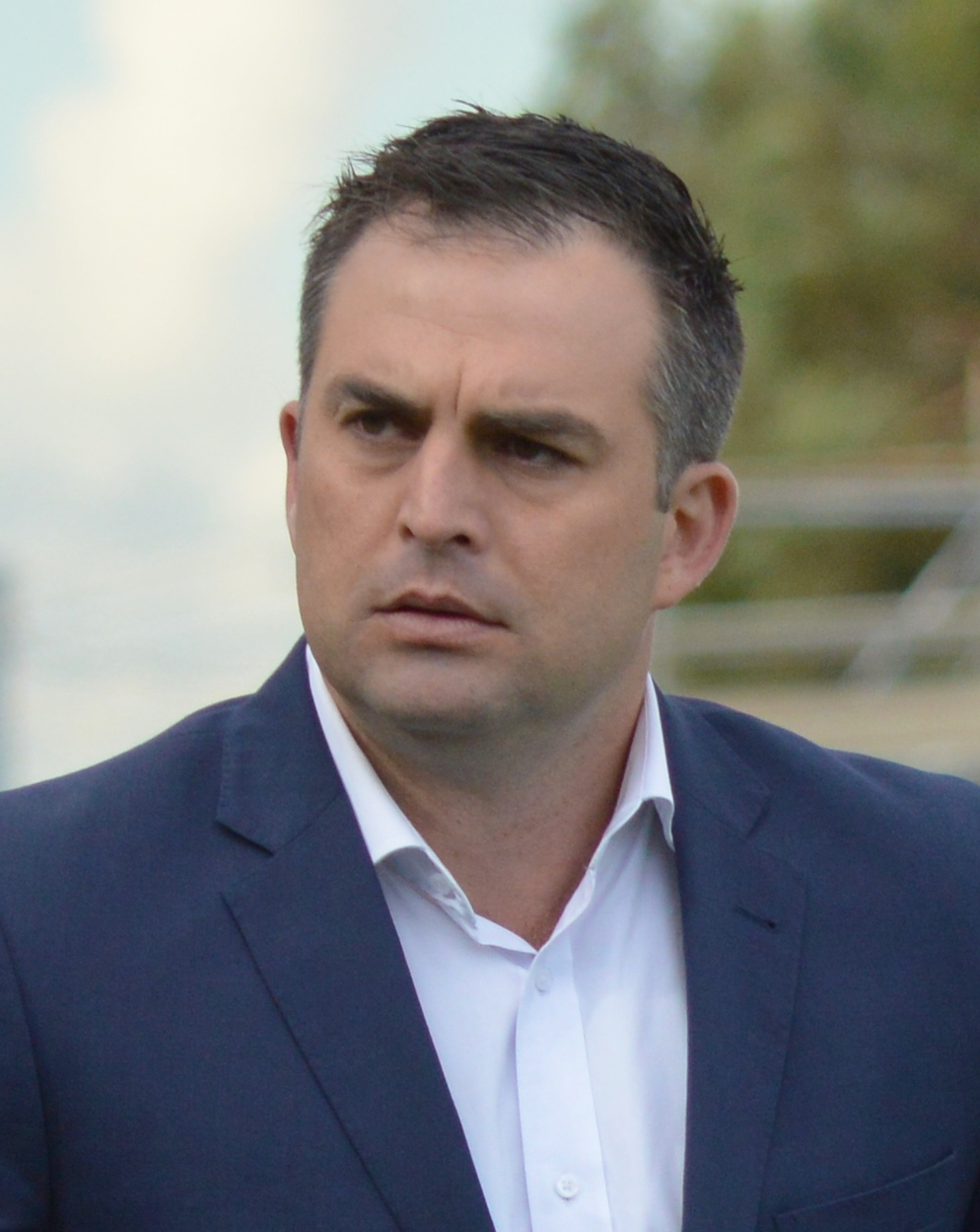
- Lake in February 2017

Personal information
- Full name: Brian Lake
- Born: 27 February 1982 (age 44)
- Original team: Woodville-West Torrens (SANFL)
- Draft: No. 71, 2001 national draft
- Debut: Round 21, 2002, Western Bulldogs vs. Carlton, at Colonial Stadium
- Height: 195 cm (6 ft 5 in)
- Weight: 98 kg (216 lb)
- Position: Full-back

Playing career^{1}
Years	Club	Games (Goals)
2002–2012	Western Bulldogs	197 (32)
2013–2015	Hawthorn	54 (2)
Total		251 (34)
- ^{1} Playing statistics correct to the end of 2015.

Career highlights
- 3× AFL premiership player: 2013–2015; Norm Smith Medal: 2013; 2× All-Australian team: 2009, 2010; Charles Sutton Medal: 2007

Brian Lake (né Harris; born 27 February 1982) is a former professional Australian rules footballer who played for the Western Bulldogs and Hawthorn Football Club in the Australian Football League (AFL). He coaches the Caroline Springs Lakers Football Club in the Western Football Netball League and formerly played for them until he announced his retirement in 2025.

== Early career ==
Picked late in the 2001 AFL draft at pick 71 from Woodville-West Torrens due to a sleep apnea condition that resulted in him falling asleep in club interviews; the Western Bulldogs discovered this and realised they could get him as late as they wished. Lake was a relatively late developer. Making his AFL debut late in the 2002 season, he was seen as a raw full-back who was some way from fully developing.

== AFL career ==
=== Western Bulldogs ===
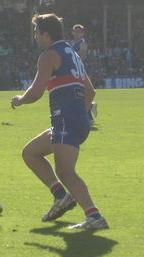
Lake playing for the Western Bulldogs in 2008

By the 2005 season, Lake's role in blanketing some of the best full-forwards in the game was seen as outstanding. He had come of age and shown significant improvement, much like many other of his Western Bulldogs teammates (such as Daniel Giansiracusa, Robert Murphy and Dale Morris), who led the team to within half a game of a finals' berth.

In round three, 2006, Lake was responsible for the hamstring injury that ended the season of Essendon's Matthew Lloyd, when he landed on him midway through the third quarter of the teams' clash at Marvel Stadium.

In 2007, he developed into one of the leading full-backs in the competition and is remembered for the match against St Kilda in which he held Fraser Gehrig, a dual-Coleman Medal winner, to no possessions for the entire match. That year, he won the Charles Sutton Medal as the Bulldogs' best and fairest player.

Lake earned a place in the 2009 AFL All-Australian team in the back pocket as his first All-Australian honour. In the 2010 season, he was again named in the 2010 AFL All-Australian team at full back. Lake has often been referred by many commentators as a "defensive monster" due to his ability to out strength his opponent and take the mark in contested situations.

=== Hawthorn ===
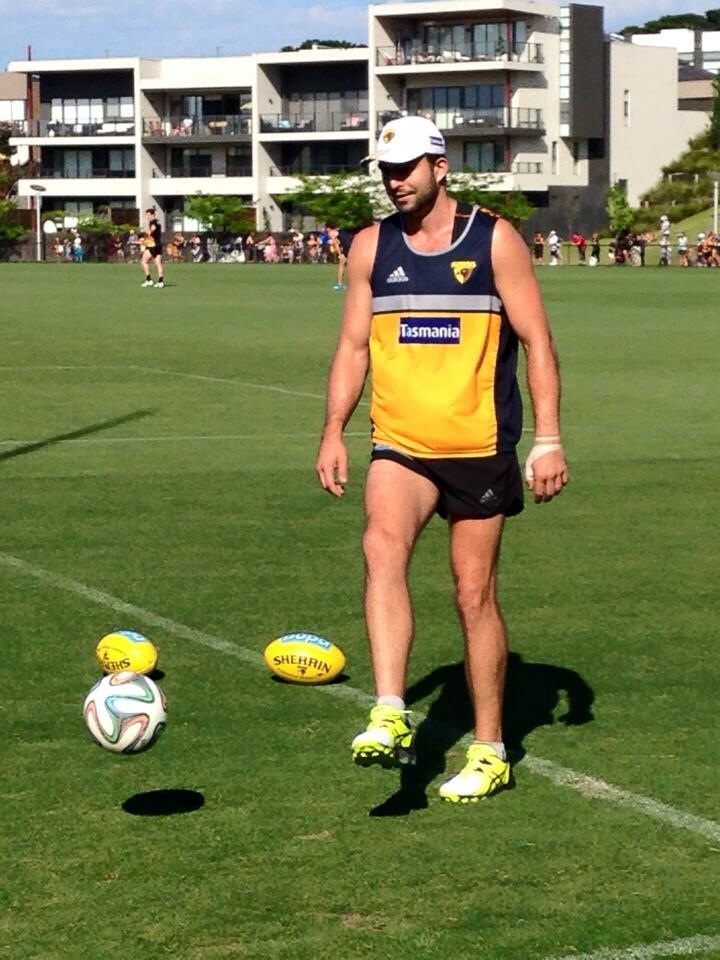
Lake training with Hawthorn in 2015

Lake, along with pick 27, were traded to the Hawthorn Football Club at the end of the 2012 season during the trade period, in return for picks 21 and 41. The trade on the first day of trade week had caught many sport commentators by surprise that a deal was done so quickly. While the rest of the Hawthorn playing group were away on holidays, Lake trained at Waverley and lost 5 kilos before the team returned for pre-season training. A corked thigh caused him to delay his debut for his new club until round 5 against North Melbourne.

Lake's move to Hawthorn culminated in his first AFL premiership, with Hawthorn defeating Fremantle and Lake winning the Norm Smith Medal for best on ground. Lake played 21 games in his first season as a Hawk, his two goals were kicked against Sydney in consecutive weeks. In 2014 Lake was involved in an on field incident with North Melbourne's Drew Petrie during their teams' Round 16 match. Lake was seen holding Petrie in a strangle-like position on the ground for an extended period of a time before Petrie's teammates dragged Lake away. Lake was charged with misconduct by the AFL Match Review Panel and referred straight to the AFL Tribunal for determination. Lake went on to win 2 more AFL premierships with Hawthorn in 2014 and 2015, playing a pivotal role in Hawthorn's success. This era is the first time Hawthorn have ever won 3 successive premierships in its history. Lake announced his retirement on 6 October 2015 after playing his last game for Hawthorn in the 2015 AFL Grand Final and winning his 3rd AFL premiership.

== Criminal history ==
In January 2013, Lake and his wife were locked up for four hours after a drunken altercation following the Portsea Polo. In July 2018, Lake spent five nights in a Japanese prison after being arrested after a drunken bar fight in Osaka. On 4 April 2019, Lake was arrested and charged with a series of offences including theft, criminal damage, stalking and entering a place likely to cause a breach of peace.

== Personal life ==
At Christmas 2007, he legally changed his name from "Brian Harris" to "Brian Lake" in order to continue his father's family name. Lake currently resides in Caroline Springs, a suburb in Melbourne's west. He now is actively coaching the Caroline Springs Football Club after formerly playing for them. He was a contestant on Australian Survivor: Champions vs. Contenders, ultimately coming in third place.

== Statistics ==
Legend
G	Goals	K	Kicks	D	Disposals	T	Tackles
B	Behinds	H	Handballs	M	Marks
#	Played in that season's premiership team	†	Led the league for the season

Season	Team	No.	Games	Totals							Averages (per game)							Votes
Season	Team	No.	Games	G	B	K	H	D	M	T	G	B	K	H	D	M	T	Votes
2002	Western Bulldogs	36	1	0	0	1	1	2	1	0	0.0	0.0	1.0	1.0	2.0	1.0	0.0	0
2003	Western Bulldogs	36	13	6	7	44	31	75	23	19	0.5	0.5	3.4	2.4	5.8	1.8	1.5	0
2004	Western Bulldogs	36	17	0	0	72	40	112	47	18	0.0	0.0	4.2	2.4	6.6	2.8	1.1	0
2005	Western Bulldogs	36	22	2	1	150	81	231	85	26	0.1	0.0	6.8	3.7	10.5	3.9	1.2	0
2006	Western Bulldogs	36	24	1	0	177	127	304	123	49	0.0	0.0	7.4	5.3	12.7	5.1	2.0	0
2007	Western Bulldogs	36	20	0	1	237	106	343	182	35	0.0	0.1	11.9	5.3	17.2	9.1	1	2
2008	Western Bulldogs	36	25	4	2	272	171	443	175	50	0.2	0.1	10.9	6.8	17.7	7.0	2.0	2
2009	Western Bulldogs	36	25	2	6	290	183	473	208	34	0.1	0.2	11.6	7.3	18.9	8.3	1.4	7
2010	Western Bulldogs	36	25	10	6	344	177	521	240^{†}	58	0.4	0.2	13.8	7.1	20.8	9.6^{†}	2.3	8
2011	Western Bulldogs	36	5	3	0	41	17	58	20	8	0.6	0.0	8.2	3.4	11.6	4.0	1.6	0
2012	Western Bulldogs	36	20	4	7	261	82	343	160	30	0.2	0.4	13.1	4.1	17.2	8.0	1.5	7
2013^{#}	Hawthorn	17	21	2	1	199	129	328	158	39	0.1	0.0	9.5	6.1	15.6	7.5	1.9	0
2014^{#}	Hawthorn	17	11	0	1	80	73	153	61	12	0.0	0.1	7.3	6.6	13.9	5.5	1.1	0
2015^{#}	Hawthorn	17	22	0	0	192	120	312	147	34	0.0	0.0	8.7	5.5	14.2	6.7	1.5	0
Career			251	34	32	2360	1338	3698	1630	412	0.1	0.1	9.4	5.3	14.7	6.5	1.6	26

== Honours and achievements ==
Team

- 3× AFL premiership player (Hawthorn): 2013, 2014, 2015
- Minor premiership (Hawthorn): 2013

Individual

- Norm Smith Medal: 2013
- 2× All-Australian team: 2009, 2010
- Charles Sutton Medal: 2007
- Western Bulldogs life member
