= 2009 All-Australian team =

The 2009 All-Australian team represents the best-performed Australian Football League (AFL) players during the 2009 season. It was announced on 14 September as a complete Australian rules football team of 22 players. An initial squad of 40 players was previously announced on 1 September. The team is honorary and does not play any games.

== Selection panel ==
The selection panel for the 2009 All-Australian team consisted of non-voting chairman Andrew Demetriou, Adrian Anderson, Kevin Bartlett, Gerard Healy, James Hird, Glen Jakovich, Mark Ricciuto and Robert Walls.

== Team ==
=== Initial squad ===
A squad of 40 players, consisting of 12 defenders, 12 forwards and 16 midfielders/ruckmen was announced on 1 September. The top four teams after the home-and-away season provided 24 of the 40 players selected in the initial squad, with the bottom eight teams only providing seven players. Three clubs, Melbourne, Port Adelaide and Richmond, did not have any players nominated.

Controversial omissions from the squad include former Brownlow Medallists Simon Black and Jason Akermanis, as well as prolific midfielders Jobe Watson, Scott Thompson, Bryce Gibbs, Aaron Davey, Joel Corey and Daniel Cross. Dane Swan was surprisingly named as a forward despite playing mainly as a midfielder and only scoring 17 goals during the season.

2009 All-Australian squad
Defenders
Craig Bolton (Sydney)	Corey Enright (Geelong)	Dustin Fletcher (Essendon)	Sam Gilbert (St Kilda)
Brendon Goddard (St Kilda)	Simon Goodwin (Adelaide)	Ryan Hargrave (Western Bulldogs)	Brian Lake (Western Bulldogs)
Andrew Mackie (Geelong)	Nick Maxwell (Collingwood)	Simon Prestigiacomo (Collingwood)	Matthew Scarlett (Geelong)
Midfielders/Ruckmen
Gary Ablett, Jr. (Geelong)	Jimmy Bartel (Geelong)	Matthew Boyd (Western Bulldogs)	Mitch Clark (Brisbane Lions)
Nick Dal Santo (St Kilda)	Alan Didak (Collingwood)	Lenny Hayes (St Kilda)	Chris Judd (Carlton)
Hamish McIntosh (North Melbourne)	Leigh Montagna (St Kilda)	Marc Murphy (Carlton)	Scott Pendlebury (Collingwood)
Aaron Sandilands (Fremantle)	Joel Selwood (Geelong)	Brad Sewell (Hawthorn)	Bernie Vince (Adelaide)
Forwards
Jonathan Brown (Brisbane Lions)	Paul Chapman (Geelong)	Leon Davis (Collingwood)	Brendan Fevola (Carlton)
Lance Franklin (Hawthorn)	Adam Goodes (Sydney)	Steve Johnson (Geelong)	Mark LeCras (West Coast)
Stephen Milne (St Kilda)	Jason Porplyzia (Adelaide)	Nick Riewoldt (St Kilda)	Dane Swan (Collingwood)

=== Final team ===
Nick Riewoldt was named as captain of the All-Australian team for the first time. The top two teams for the season, Geelong and St Kilda, each had five players selected. Nine players were selected for the first time, with Matthew Scarlett and Simon Goodwin receiving their fifth respective selections.

The most controversial selections were the selection of Collingwood pair Leon Davis and midfielder Dane Swan as forwards despite kicking only 34 and 18 goals, respectively, ahead of Mark LeCras, who kicked 58 goals for the season, and Jason Porplyzia, who kicked 52 goals.

2009 All-Australian team
B:	Corey Enright (Geelong)	Matthew Scarlett (Geelong)	Brian Lake (Western Bulldogs)
HB:	Simon Goodwin (Adelaide)	Craig Bolton (Sydney)	Nick Maxwell (Collingwood)
C:	Leigh Montagna (St Kilda)	Lenny Hayes (St Kilda)	Joel Selwood (Geelong)
HF:	Paul Chapman (Geelong)	Nick Riewoldt (St Kilda) (captain)	Dane Swan (Collingwood)
F:	Leon Davis (Collingwood)	Brendan Fevola (Carlton)	Jonathan Brown (Brisbane Lions)
Foll:	Aaron Sandilands (Fremantle)	Chris Judd (Carlton) (vice-captain)	Gary Ablett Jr. (Geelong)
Int:	Matthew Boyd (Western Bulldogs)	Nick Dal Santo (St Kilda)	Brendon Goddard (St Kilda)
Int:	Adam Goodes (Sydney)		
Coach:	Mark Thompson (Geelong)		

Note: the position of coach in the All-Australian team is traditionally awarded to the coach of the premiership team.
