= 2013 AFL season =

117th season of the Australian Football League (AFL)

2013 AFL premiership season
- Teams: 18
- Premiers: Hawthorn; 11th premiership
- Minor premiers: Hawthorn; 9th minor premiership
- Pre-season cup: Brisbane Lions; 1st pre-season cup win
- Brownlow Medallist: Gary Ablett Jr. Gold Coast (28 votes)
- Coleman Medallist: Jarryd Roughead; Hawthorn (68 goals)

Attendance
- Matches played: 207
- Total attendance: 6,931,085 (33,484 per match)
- Highest (H&A): 93,373 (round 5, Essendon v Collingwood)
- Highest (finals): 100,007 (Grand Final, Hawthorn vs. Fremantle)

The 2013 AFL season was the 117th season of the Australian Football League (AFL), the highest level senior Australian rules football competition in Australia, which was known as the Victorian Football League until 1989. The season featured eighteen clubs, ran from 22 March until 28 September, and comprised a 22-game home-and-away season followed by a finals series featuring the top eight clubs.

The premiership was won by the Hawthorn Football Club for the eleventh time, after it defeated Fremantle by 15 points in the 2013 AFL Grand Final.

The season was marred by a series of off-field controversies, with three clubs penalised in 2013 for separate infractions which had taken place over previous years: Essendon, following an Australian Sports Anti-Doping Authority investigation into the club's supplements program; Adelaide, after illegal payments and draft-tampering charges relating to Kurt Tippett's 2009 contract extension; and Melbourne, after an investigation into allegations that the club had intentionally lost matches towards the end of the 2009 season.

== Pre-season ==
=== All Stars game ===
The biennial All Star game played in the Northern Territory, featuring an AFL team and the Indigenous All Stars team, made up of some of the best Indigenous players in the game, returned for the 2013 pre-season. Richmond were selected as the AFL team to partake in the game, which was played at Traeger Park in Alice Springs.

2013 Indigenous All Stars Game
Friday, 8 February 7:45pm (ACST)	Indigenous All Stars	def.	Richmond	Traeger Park, Alice Springs (crowd: 8,350)	Report
5.0 (30); 8.1 (49); 12.4 (76); 14.6 (90)	Q1; Q2; Q3; Final	1.1 (7); 2.1 (13); 3.1 (19); 6.4 (40)	Polly Farmer Medal: Harley Bennell; Television broadcast: afl.com.au
Johncock 3, Jones 2, Betts 2, Leroy Jetta, Ryder, Ugle, Thomas, Anderson, Bennell, Newman	Goals	McGuane 2, Stephenson 2, McDonough, A.Edwards
Bennell, Jones, Alwyn Davey, Johncock, Betts	Best	Martin, S.Edwards, Conca, Grigg, Elton
Nil	Injuries	Nil
Nil	Reports	Nil

=== NAB Cup ===
The 2013 NAB Cup was won by the Brisbane Lions, their first ever win preseason competition win, when they defeated Carlton by 40 points.

2013 NAB Cup Grand Final
Friday, 15 March 7:45pm (AEDT)	Carlton	def. by	Brisbane Lions	Etihad Stadium (crowd: 24,884)	Report
1.2.0 (21); 2.6.6 (60); 2.7.7 (67); 2.7.9 (69)	Q1; Q2; Q3; Final	0.5.3 (33); 0.7.5 (47); 0.12.10 (82); 0.16.13 (109)	Umpires: Bannister, Margetts, Jeffery; Michael Tuck Medal: Daniel Rich; Television broadcast: Seven Network / Fox Footy
Bryce Gibbs, Zach Tuohy	Super Goals	N/A
Betts, Casboult, Duigan, Kreuzer, Robinson, Rowe, White	Goals	Brown 5, Green 3, Zorko 2, Bewick, Karnezis, McGrath, Polkinghorne, Redden, Rich
Gibbs, Simpson, Yarran, Kreuzer, Murphy	Best	Rich, Zorko, Hanley, Brown, Karnezis, Moloney, Merrett, Green
N/A	Injuries	N/A
N/A	Reports	N/A
Due to the unavailability of the Gabba because of cricket commitments, the AFL chose to schedule the match at Etihad Stadium rather than Metricon Stadium in Queensland, citing that the largest possible crowd would be drawn in Melbourne ahead of any potential game on the Gold Coast.

== Premiership season ==
The full fixture was released on Wednesday 31 October 2012.

- For the second consecutive year, the AFL's opening round was spread across two weekends.
- Due to concern over one-sided matches, each of the top four teams from 2012 (Sydney, Hawthorn, Adelaide and Collingwood) played each of the bottom four teams (the Western Bulldogs, Melbourne, Gold Coast and Greater Western Sydney) only once each – except that Sydney played local rival Greater Western Sydney twice, and that the Western Bulldogs played Adelaide twice.
- None of the bottom five teams from 2012 (Western Bulldogs, Port Adelaide, Melbourne, Gold Coast and Greater Western Sydney) featured in a Friday night match during the home-and-away season. This is due to the AFL's policy of awarding Friday night matches only to teams that perform consistently throughout the season.
- This season was the last in which AFL football was played at AAMI Stadium, with both Adelaide and Port Adelaide moving to a redeveloped Adelaide Oval from the 2014 season.
- Match starting times are local.

=== Round 1 ===
	Round 1
Friday, 22 March (8:10 pm)	Adelaide 11.16 (82)	def. by	Essendon 18.9 (117)	AAMI Stadium (crowd: 42,218)	Match report
Saturday, 23 March (4:40 pm)	Fremantle 16.12 (108)	def.	West Coast 11.14 (80)	Patersons Stadium (crowd: 39,629)	Match report
Thursday, 28 March (7:45 pm)	Carlton 14.17 (101)	def. by	Richmond 14.22 (106)	MCG (crowd: 80,971)	Match report
Saturday, 30 March (1:40 pm)	Western Bulldogs 19.13 (127)	def.	Brisbane Lions 7.17 (59)	Etihad Stadium (crowd: 25,263)	Match report
Saturday, 30 March (4:40 pm)	Greater Western Sydney 11.10 (76)	def. by	Sydney 16.10 (106)	ANZ Stadium (crowd: 23,690)	Match report
Saturday, 30 March (6:45 pm)	Gold Coast 13.12 (90)	def.	St Kilda 10.17 (77)	Metricon Stadium (crowd: 13,832)	Match report
Sunday, 31 March (1:10 pm)	Melbourne 8.6 (54)	def. by	Port Adelaide 19.19 (133)	MCG (crowd: 22,924)	Match report
Sunday, 31 March (4:40 pm)	North Melbourne 13.9 (87)	def. by	Collingwood 15.13 (103)	Etihad Stadium (crowd: 41,040)	Match report
Monday, 1 April (3:20 pm)	Hawthorn 12.14 (86)	def. by	Geelong 13.15 (93)	MCG (crowd: 76,300)	Match report

=== Round 2 ===
	Round 2
Friday, 5 April (7:50 pm)	St Kilda 12.10 (82)	def. by	Richmond 14.15 (99)	MCG (crowd: 56,783)	Match report
Saturday, 6 April (1:45 pm)	Sydney 17.12 (114)	def.	Gold Coast 11.7 (73)	SCG (crowd: 20,372)	Match report
Saturday, 6 April (2:10 pm)	Western Bulldogs 11.12 (78)	def. by	Fremantle 16.10 (106)	Etihad Stadium (crowd: 19,210)	Match report
Saturday, 6 April (3:40 pm)	Brisbane Lions 10.17 (77)	def. by	Adelaide 14.12 (96)	Gabba (crowd: 21,308)	Match report
Saturday, 6 April (7:10 pm)	Port Adelaide 19.20 (134)	def.	Greater Western Sydney 11.12 (78)	AAMI Stadium (crowd: 25,122)	Match report
Saturday, 6 April (7:40 pm)	Essendon 28.16 (184)	def.	Melbourne 5.6 (36)	MCG (crowd: 51,153)	Match report
Sunday, 7 April (1:10 pm)	Geelong 16.16 (112)	def.	North Melbourne 17.6 (108)	Etihad Stadium (crowd: 34,152)	Match report
Sunday, 7 April (3:20 pm)	Collingwood 17.15 (117)	def.	Carlton 15.10 (100)	MCG (crowd: 84,247)	Match report
Sunday, 7 April (2:40 pm)	West Coast 15.8 (98)	def. by	Hawthorn 23.10 (148)	Patersons Stadium (crowd: 38,389)	Match report
Essendon broke the record for its highest winning margin against Melbourne, winning by 148 points.; Geelong defeated North Melbourne after trailing by 41 points late in the second quarter.

=== Round 3 ===
	Round 3
Friday, 12 April (6:40 pm)	Fremantle 9.14 (68)	def. by	Essendon 10.12 (72)	Patersons Stadium (crowd: 35,963)	Match report
Saturday, 13 April (1:45 pm)	North Melbourne 13.14 (92)	def. by	Sydney 20.11 (131)	Blundstone Arena (crowd: 13,221)	Match report
Saturday, 13 April (2:10 pm)	Melbourne 13.5 (83)	def. by	West Coast 27.15 (177)	MCG (crowd: 18,571)	Match report
Saturday, 13 April (4:40 pm)	Greater Western Sydney 10.8 (68)	def. by	St Kilda 21.14 (140)	StarTrack Oval Canberra (crowd: 11,092)	Match report
Saturday, 13 April (7:40 pm)	Geelong 18.11 (119)	def.	Carlton 15.13 (103)	Etihad Stadium (crowd: 43,241)	Match report
Saturday, 13 April (7:40 pm)	Gold Coast 13.14 (92)	def. by	Brisbane Lions 13.16 (94)	Metricon Stadium (crowd: 12,961)	Match report
Sunday, 14 April (1:10 pm)	Richmond 20.15 (135)	def.	Western Bulldogs 10.8 (68)	Etihad Stadium (crowd: 44,045)	Match report
Sunday, 14 April (3:20 pm)	Collingwood 13.12 (90)	def. by	Hawthorn 22.13 (145)	MCG (crowd: 72,254)	Match report
Sunday, 14 April (4:10 pm)	Port Adelaide 17.16 (118)	def.	Adelaide 16.13 (109)	AAMI Stadium (crowd: 40,707)	Match report

=== Round 4 ===
	Round 4
Friday, 19 April (7:50 pm)	Sydney 16.7 (103)	def. by	Geelong 19.10 (124)	SCG (crowd: 31,060)	Match report
Saturday, 20 April (1:45 pm)	Hawthorn 18.10 (118)	def.	Fremantle 11.10 (76)	Aurora Stadium (crowd: 12,619)	Match report
Saturday, 20 April (2:10 pm)	Richmond 11.13 (79)	def. by	Collingwood 16.17 (113)	MCG (crowd: 81,950)	Match report
Saturday, 20 April (4:40 pm)	St Kilda 13.13 (91)	def. by	Essendon 19.14 (128)	Etihad Stadium (crowd: 46,965)	Match report
Saturday, 20 April (5:40 pm)	West Coast 7.23 (65)	def. by	Carlton 12.17 (89)	Patersons Stadium (crowd: 38,674)	Match report
Saturday, 20 April (7:40 pm)	Gold Coast 9.12 (66)	def. by	Port Adelaide 16.8 (104)	Metricon Stadium (crowd: 11,332)	Match report
Sunday, 21 April (1:10 pm)	Melbourne 22.12 (144)	def.	Greater Western Sydney 15.13 (103)	MCG (crowd: 20,018)	Match report
Sunday, 21 April (2:50 pm)	Adelaide 12.8 (80)	def.	Western Bulldogs 4.4 (28)	AAMI Stadium (crowd: 24,684)	Match report
Sunday, 21 April (4:40 pm)	North Melbourne 18.17 (125)	def.	Brisbane Lions 9.8 (62)	Etihad Stadium (crowd: 22,776)	Match report
Melbourne scored 12.2 (74) in the final quarter against Greater Western Sydney, setting a new record for its highest score in any quarter in its history.; The Western Bulldogs' final score of 4.4 (28) was its lowest in any game since round 16, 1996.; North Melbourne's Majak Daw became the first Sudanese player to play in the AFL.

=== Round 5 ===
	Round 5
Thursday, 25 April (2:40 pm)	Essendon 18.13 (121)	def.	Collingwood 10.15 (75)	MCG (crowd: 93,373)	Match report
Thursday, 25 April (7:50 pm)	St Kilda 9.9 (63)	def. by	Sydney 11.13 (79)	Westpac Stadium (crowd: 22,546)	Match report
Friday, 26 April (6:45 pm)	Fremantle 12.9 (81)	def.	Richmond 12.8 (80)	Patersons Stadium (crowd: 36,365)	Match report
Saturday, 27 April (1:45 pm)	Greater Western Sydney 16.8 (104)	def. by	Gold Coast 21.22 (148)	StarTrack Oval Canberra (crowd: 6,832)	Match report
Saturday, 27 April (4:40 pm)	Carlton 17.13 (115)	def.	Adelaide 12.11 (83)	MCG (crowd: 44,711)	Match report
Saturday, 27 April (7:15 pm)	Port Adelaide 12.12 (84)	def.	West Coast 10.19 (79)	AAMI Stadium (crowd: 26,132)	Match report
Saturday, 27 April (7:40 pm)	Western Bulldogs 13.8 (86)	def. by	Geelong 15.17 (107)	Etihad Stadium (crowd: 26,153)	Match report
Sunday, 28 April (3:20 pm)	Brisbane Lions 17.20 (122)	def.	Melbourne 14.10 (94)	Gabba (crowd: 19,018)	Match report
Sunday, 28 April (4:40 pm)	Hawthorn 14.15 (99)	def.	North Melbourne 13.18 (96)	MCG (crowd: 42,103)	Match report
The St Kilda vs Sydney match was the first AFL premiership match played outside Australia.

=== Round 6 ===
	Round 6
Friday, 3 May (7:50 pm)	Collingwood 15.13 (103)	def.	St Kilda 11.11 (77)	Etihad Stadium (crowd: 40,071)	Match report
Saturday, 4 May (1:45 pm)	Essendon 17.18 (120)	def.	Greater Western Sydney 12.9 (81)	Etihad Stadium (crowd: 30,143)	Match report
Saturday, 4 May (2:10 pm)	North Melbourne 14.9 (93)	def.	Port Adelaide 12.11 (83)	Blundstone Arena (crowd: 10,265)	Match report
Saturday, 4 May (4:10 pm)	Adelaide 11.12 (78)	def. by	Hawthorn 13.11 (89)	AAMI Stadium (crowd: 37,324)	Match report
Saturday, 4 May (7:40 pm)	Gold Coast 7.12 (54)	def. by	Fremantle 15.9 (99)	Metricon Stadium (crowd: 10,552)	Match report
Saturday, 4 May (7:40 pm)	Richmond 13.9 (87)	def. by	Geelong 20.11 (131)	MCG (crowd: 55,625)	Match report
Sunday, 5 May (1:10 pm)	Sydney 17.13 (115)	def.	Brisbane Lions 8.7 (55)	SCG (crowd: 23,315)	Match report
Sunday, 5 May (3:20 pm)	Carlton 18.13 (121)	def.	Melbourne 8.12 (60)	MCG (crowd: 35,286)	Match report
Sunday, 5 May (2:40 pm)	West Coast 21.11 (137)	def.	Western Bulldogs 10.7 (67)	Patersons Stadium (crowd: 36,163)	Match report

=== Round 7 ===
	Round 7
Friday, 10 May (7:50 pm)	Geelong 17.11 (113)	def.	Essendon 11.19 (85)	Etihad Stadium (crowd: 53,014)	Match report
Saturday, 11 May (1:15 pm)	Port Adelaide 10.13 (73)	def. by	Richmond 18.6 (114)	AAMI Stadium (crowd: 25,372)	Match report
Saturday, 11 May (2:10 pm)	Brisbane Lions 12.10 (82)	def. by	West Coast 17.6 (108)	Gabba (crowd: 17,615)	Match report
Saturday, 11 May (4:40 pm)	Western Bulldogs 15.7 (97)	def. by	North Melbourne 22.19 (151)	Etihad Stadium (crowd: 23,690)	Match report
Saturday, 11 May (5:40 pm)	Fremantle 15.10 (100)	def.	Collingwood 10.13 (73)	Patersons Stadium (crowd: 37,214)	Match report
Saturday, 11 May (7:40 pm)	Hawthorn 18.11 (119)	def.	Sydney 12.10 (82)	MCG (crowd: 54,725)	Match report
Sunday, 12 May (1:10 pm)	Greater Western Sydney 7.10 (52)	def. by	Adelaide 29.13 (187)	Škoda Stadium (crowd: 5,830)	Match report
Sunday, 12 May (4:40 pm)	Melbourne 7.12 (54)	def. by	Gold Coast 16.18 (114)	MCG (crowd: 13,304)	Match report
Monday, 13 May (7:40 pm)	St Kilda 11.11 (77)	def.	Carlton 9.14 (68)	Etihad Stadium (crowd: 34,054)	Match report
The crowd of 5,830 for the Greater Western Sydney vs Adelaide match was the lowest for a premiership match since 1996.; Tom Lynch (Adelaide) kicked ten goals in his team's win against Greater Western Sydney.

=== Round 8 ===
	Round 8
Friday, 17 May (6:40 pm)	West Coast 12.18 (90)	def.	North Melbourne 13.10 (88)	Patersons Stadium (crowd: 38,146)	Match report
Saturday, 18 May (1:45 pm)	Essendon 12.14 (86)	def. by	Brisbane Lions 14.12 (96)	Etihad Stadium (crowd: 33,915)	Match report
Saturday, 18 May (2:10 pm)	Hawthorn 21.14 (140)	def.	Greater Western Sydney 9.3 (57)	Aurora Stadium (crowd: 10,513)	Match report
Saturday, 18 May (4:40 pm)	Gold Coast 13.15 (93)	def.	Western Bulldogs 8.13 (61)	Metricon Stadium (crowd: 13,520)	Match report
Saturday, 18 May (7:40 pm)	Sydney 11.4 (70)	drew with	Fremantle 9.16 (70)	SCG (crowd: 22,546)	Match report
Saturday, 18 May (7:40 pm)	Collingwood 15.12 (102)	def.	Geelong 14.12 (96)	MCG (crowd: 66,768)	Match report
Sunday, 19 May (1:10 pm)	Carlton 16.13 (109)	def.	Port Adelaide 14.7 (91)	Etihad Stadium (crowd: 29,936)	Match report
Sunday, 19 May (3:20 pm)	Richmond 15.16 (106)	def.	Melbourne 11.6 (72)	MCG (crowd: 39,148)	Match report
Sunday, 19 May (4:10 pm)	Adelaide 12.15 (87)	def.	St Kilda 6.11 (47)	AAMI Stadium (crowd: 34,605)	Match report
West Coast defeated North Melbourne after Nic Naitanui kicked a goal after the final siren.; Gold Coast recorded consecutive victories for the first time in its history.

=== Round 9 ===
	Round 9
Friday, 24 May (7:50 pm)	Collingwood 8.7 (55)	def. by	Sydney 15.12 (102)	MCG (crowd: 65,306)	Match report
Saturday, 25 May (1:15 pm)	Port Adelaide 9.14 (68)	def. by	Geelong 18.8 (116)	AAMI Stadium (crowd: 21,309)	Match report
Saturday, 25 May (2:10 pm)	Greater Western Sydney 8.7 (55)	def. by	West Coast 23.17 (155)	Škoda Stadium (crowd: 6,324)	Match report
Saturday, 25 May (4:40 pm)	St Kilda 15.11 (101)	def. by	Western Bulldogs 17.8 (110)	Etihad Stadium (crowd: 25,982)	Match report
Saturday, 25 May (7:40 pm)	Brisbane Lions 12.13 (85)	def. by	Carlton 13.20 (98)	Gabba (crowd: 24,037)	Match report
Saturday, 25 May (7:45 pm)	Richmond 9.8 (62)	def. by	Essendon 13.13 (91)	MCG (crowd: 84,234)	Match report
Sunday, 26 May (1:10 pm)	Hawthorn 18.10 (118)	def.	Gold Coast 14.8 (92)	MCG (crowd: 28,112)	Match report
Sunday, 26 May (3:20 pm)	North Melbourne 19.10 (124)	def. by	Adelaide 18.17 (125)	Etihad Stadium (crowd: 23,033)	Match report
Sunday, 26 May (2:40 pm)	Fremantle 19.16 (130)	def.	Melbourne 6.4 (40)	Patersons Stadium (crowd: 32,950)	Match report

=== Round 10 ===
	Round 10
Friday, 31 May (7:50 pm)	Brisbane Lions 7.9 (51)	def. by	Collingwood 14.16 (100)	Gabba (crowd: 26,626)	Match report
Saturday, 1 June (1:45 pm)	Carlton 22.16 (148)	def.	Greater Western Sydney 8.6 (54)	Etihad Stadium (crowd: 25,008)	Match report
Saturday, 1 June (1:40 pm)	Adelaide 8.11 (59)	def. by	Fremantle 10.6 (66)	AAMI Stadium (crowd: 27,684)	Match report
Saturday, 1 June (4:40 pm)	Sydney 17.13 (115)	def.	Essendon 10.11 (71)	SCG (crowd: 29,792)	Match report
Saturday, 1 June (7:40 pm)	Geelong 18.15 (123)	def.	Gold Coast 10.11 (71)	Simonds Stadium (crowd: 30,082)	Match report
Saturday, 1 June (7:10 pm)	Western Bulldogs 10.7 (67)	def.	Port Adelaide 8.10 (58)	TIO Stadium (crowd: 7,850)	Match report
Sunday, 2 June (3:20 pm)	Melbourne 6.12 (48)	def. by	Hawthorn 21.17 (143)	MCG (crowd: 28,546)	Match report
Sunday, 2 June (4:40 pm)	North Melbourne 19.19 (133)	def.	St Kilda 10.5 (65)	Etihad Stadium (crowd: 25,658)	Match report
Monday, 3 June (5:40 pm)	West Coast 8.14 (62)	def. by	Richmond 16.7 (103)	Patersons Stadium (crowd: 37,781)	Match report
For the first time, Geelong played a night match at Simonds Stadium, their home stadium.

=== Round 11 ===
	Round 11
Friday, 7 June (7:50 pm)	Essendon 11.11 (77)	def.	Carlton 10.12 (72)	MCG (crowd: 82,639)	Match report
Saturday, 8 June (1:40 pm)	Greater Western Sydney 15.8 (98)	def. by	Geelong 24.13 (157)	Škoda Stadium (crowd: 7,809)	Match report
Saturday, 8 June (4:10 pm)	Adelaide 6.14 (50)	def. by	Sydney 19.13 (127)	AAMI Stadium (crowd: 38,374)	Match report
Saturday, 8 June (7:40 pm)	Gold Coast 9.12 (66)	def.	North Melbourne 8.3 (51)	Metricon Stadium (crowd: 10,891)	Match report
Sunday, 9 June (4:40 pm)	St Kilda 11.14 (80)	def. by	West Coast 12.12 (84)	Etihad Stadium (crowd: 23,795)	Match report
Monday, 10 June (3:15 pm)	Melbourne 5.9 (39)	def. by	Collingwood 17.20 (122)	MCG (crowd: 50,835)	Match report
	Bye; Brisbane Lions, Fremantle, Hawthorn, Port Adelaide, Richmond, Western Bulldogs

=== Round 12 ===
	Round 12
Friday, 14 June (7:50 pm)	Carlton 13.9 (87)	def. by	Hawthorn 15.12 (102)	Etihad Stadium (crowd: 45,670)	Match report
Saturday, 15 June (1:40 pm)	Richmond 16.14 (110)	def.	Adelaide 10.12 (72)	MCG (crowd: 43,615)	Match report
Saturday, 15 June (2:40 pm)	Fremantle 12.14 (86)	def.	Brisbane Lions 6.10 (46)	Patersons Stadium (crowd: 33,384)	Match report
Saturday, 15 June (7:40 pm)	Essendon 17.13 (115)	def.	Gold Coast 11.6 (72)	Etihad Stadium (crowd: 31,452)	Match report
Sunday, 16 June (1:10 pm)	Greater Western Sydney 6.14 (50)	def. by	Port Adelaide 19.11 (125)	Škoda Stadium (crowd: 6,601)	Match report
Sunday, 16 June (4:40 pm)	Collingwood 15.9 (99)	def.	Western Bulldogs 9.11 (65)	Etihad Stadium (crowd: 32,253)	Match report
	Bye; Geelong, Melbourne, North Melbourne, St Kilda, Sydney, West Coast

=== Round 13 ===
	Round 13
Friday, 21 June (7:50 pm)	Hawthorn 19.9 (123)	def.	West Coast 16.7 (103)	Etihad Stadium (crowd: 32,567)	Match report
Saturday, 22 June (1:10 pm)	Port Adelaide 10.12 (72)	def.	Sydney 8.6 (54)	AAMI Stadium (crowd: 16,096)	Match report
Saturday, 22 June (4:40 pm)	St Kilda 16.8 (104)	def.	Melbourne 10.9 (69)	MCG (crowd: 28,751)	Match report
Saturday, 22 June (7:40 pm)	Western Bulldogs 8.13 (61)	def. by	Richmond 17.19 (121)	Etihad Stadium (crowd: 29,788)	Match report
Sunday, 23 June (1:20 pm)	Fremantle 10.7 (67)	def.	North Melbourne 4.5 (29)	Patersons Stadium (crowd: 31,637)	Match report
Sunday, 23 June (4:40 pm)	Brisbane Lions 15.13 (103)	def.	Geelong 14.14 (98)	Gabba (crowd: 24,164)	Match report
	Bye; Adelaide, Carlton, Collingwood, Essendon, Gold Coast, Greater Western Sydney
The Brisbane Lions staged the largest successful come-from-behind victory in the club's history, recovering from a 52-point third quarter deficit to defeat Geelong by five points. The victory was completed with a goal after the final siren by Ash McGrath.

=== Round 14 ===
	Round 14
Thursday, 27 June (6:10 pm)	West Coast 13.13 (91)	def. by	Essendon 15.8 (98)	Patersons Stadium (crowd: 36,451)	Match report
Friday, 28 June (7:50 pm)	Sydney 8.17 (65)	def.	Carlton 5.13 (43)	SCG (crowd: 25,349)	Match report
Saturday, 29 June (1:40 pm)	Gold Coast 11.17 (83)	def. by	Adelaide 16.15 (111)	Metricon Stadium (crowd: 13,791)	Match report
Saturday, 29 June (4:10 pm)	Port Adelaide 13.8 (86)	def.	Collingwood 7.9 (51)	AAMI Stadium (crowd: 31,121)	Match report
Saturday, 29 June (7:40 pm)	Melbourne 15.13 (103)	def.	Western Bulldogs 15.10 (100)	MCG (crowd: 21,217)	Match report
Saturday, 29 June (7:40 pm)	Geelong 11.19 (85)	def.	Fremantle 7.2 (44)	Simonds Stadium (crowd: 26,743)	Match report
Sunday, 30 June (1:10 pm)	Hawthorn 21.17 (143)	def.	Brisbane Lions 12.13 (85)	Aurora Stadium (crowd: 15,796)	Match report
Sunday, 30 June (3:20 pm)	North Melbourne 19.16 (130)	def.	Greater Western Sydney 6.8 (44)	Etihad Stadium (crowd: 15,438)	Match report
Sunday, 30 June (4:40 pm)	Richmond 17.17 (119)	def.	St Kilda 8.7 (55)	MCG (crowd: 52,184)	Match report

=== Round 15 ===
	Round 15
Friday, 5 July (7:50 pm)	Carlton 12.5 (77)	def. by	Collingwood 17.16 (118)	MCG (crowd: 78,224)	Match report
Saturday, 6 July (1:45 pm)	Greater Western Sydney 12.11 (83)	def. by	Western Bulldogs 13.9 (87)	StarTrack Oval Canberra (crowd: 7,132)	Match report
Saturday, 6 July (2:10 pm)	North Melbourne 19.14 (128)	def.	Richmond 8.18 (66)	Etihad Stadium (crowd: 45,966)	Match report
Saturday, 6 July (4:40 pm)	Brisbane Lions 17.14 (116)	def.	Gold Coast 12.11 (83)	Gabba (crowd: 27,170)	Match report
Saturday, 6 July (7:10 pm)	Adelaide 9.15 (69)	def. by	West Coast 11.9 (75)	AAMI Stadium (crowd: 26,426)	Match report
Saturday, 6 July (7:40 pm)	Geelong 11.16 (82)	def.	Hawthorn 10.12 (72)	MCG (crowd: 85,197)	Match report
Sunday, 7 July (1:10 pm)	Melbourne 13.7 (85)	def. by	Sydney 16.20 (116)	MCG (crowd: 26,216)	Match report
Sunday, 7 July (1:20 pm)	Fremantle 15.10 (100)	def.	St Kilda 11.4 (70)	Patersons Stadium (crowd: 34,064)	Match report
Sunday, 7 July (4:40 pm)	Essendon 18.10 (118)	def.	Port Adelaide 12.16 (88)	Etihad Stadium (crowd: 40,817)	Match report
Hawthorn's loss ended a twelve-game winning streak, equalling its 1961 winning streak as the longest in club history.

=== Round 16 ===
	Round 16
Friday, 12 July (7:50 pm)	Collingwood 17.9 (111)	def.	Adelaide 12.12 (84)	MCG (crowd: 54,790)	Match report
Saturday, 13 July (1:15 pm)	Port Adelaide 12.7 (79)	def. by	Hawthorn 19.10 (124)	AAMI Stadium (crowd: 23,748)	Match report
Saturday, 13 July (2:10 pm)	Geelong 13.20 (98)	def.	Melbourne 4.6 (30)	Simonds Stadium (crowd: 23,172)	Match report
Saturday, 13 July (4:40 pm)	Richmond 6.17 (53)	def.	Gold Coast 6.8 (44)	Cazaly's Stadium (crowd: 11,197)	Match report
Saturday, 13 July (7:40 pm)	Brisbane Lions 18.9 (117)	def.	North Melbourne 17.3 (105)	Gabba (crowd: 18,131)	Match report
Saturday, 13 July (7:40 pm)	Carlton 16.14 (110)	def.	St Kilda 10.14 (74)	Etihad Stadium (crowd: 30,949)	Match report
Sunday, 14 July (1:10 pm)	Sydney 24.27 (171)	def.	Greater Western Sydney 5.12 (42)	SCG (crowd: 21,757)	Match report
Sunday, 14 July (3:20 pm)	Western Bulldogs 14.6 (90)	def. by	Essendon 18.13 (121)	Etihad Stadium (crowd: 32,500)	Match report
Sunday, 14 July (2:40 pm)	West Coast 14.9 (93)	def. by	Fremantle 19.7 (121)	Patersons Stadium (crowd: 39,839)	Match report
Melbourne recorded only 19 inside-50s in its loss to Geelong, an AFL-record low since the statistic was first recorded in 1999.

=== Round 17 ===
	Round 17
Friday, 19 July (7:50 pm)	North Melbourne 16.12 (108)	def. by	Carlton 16.13 (109)	Etihad Stadium (crowd: 37,443)	Match report
Saturday, 20 July (1:45 pm)	Hawthorn 13.17 (95)	def.	Western Bulldogs 11.10 (76)	Aurora Stadium (crowd: 14,022)	Match report
Saturday, 20 July (2:10 pm)	Greater Western Sydney 11.11 (77)	def. by	Essendon 18.8 (116)	Škoda Stadium (crowd: 10,783)	Match report
Saturday, 20 July (4:40 pm)	Gold Coast 13.7 (85)	def.	Collingwood 11.12 (78)	Metricon Stadium (crowd: 19,721)	Match report
Saturday, 20 July (7:10 pm)	Melbourne 11.9 (75)	def. by	Brisbane Lions 13.16 (94)	TIO Stadium (crowd: 7,615)	Match report
Saturday, 20 July (7:40 pm)	St Kilda 13.14 (92)	def. by	Port Adelaide 14.13 (97)	Etihad Stadium (crowd: 14,878)	Match report
Sunday, 21 July (1:10 pm)	Richmond 12.12 (84)	def.	Fremantle 8.9 (57)	MCG (crowd: 40,125)	Match report
Sunday, 21 July (2:50 pm)	Adelaide 14.10 (94)	def.	Geelong 14.8 (92)	AAMI Stadium (crowd: 28,603)	Match report
Sunday, 21 July (2:40 pm)	West Coast 11.13 (79)	def. by	Sydney 17.11 (113)	Patersons Stadium (crowd: 35,166)	Match report

=== Round 18 ===
	Round 18
Friday, 26 July (7:50 pm)	Essendon 13.9 (87)	def. by	Hawthorn 22.11 (143)	Etihad Stadium (crowd: 49,505)	Match report
Saturday, 27 July (1:45 pm)	Gold Coast 11.11 (77)	def. by	Carlton 16.24 (120)	Metricon Stadium (crowd: 19,460)	Match report
Saturday, 27 July (2:10 pm)	Melbourne 4.4 (28)	def. by	North Melbourne 22.18 (150)	Etihad Stadium (crowd: 16,959)	Match report
Saturday, 27 July (4:40 pm)	Collingwood 15.16 (106)	def.	Greater Western Sydney 10.6 (66)	MCG (crowd: 32,691)	Match report
Saturday, 27 July (5:40 pm)	Fremantle 11.9 (75)	def.	Adelaide 7.11 (53)	Patersons Stadium (crowd: 28,765)	Match report
Saturday, 27 July (7:40 pm)	Geelong 21.11 (137)	def.	St Kilda 5.6 (36)	Simonds Stadium (crowd: 27,200)	Match report
Sunday, 28 July (12:40 pm)	Port Adelaide 9.17 (71)	def.	Brisbane Lions 9.8 (62)	AAMI Stadium (crowd: 22,631)	Match report
Sunday, 28 July (3:20 pm)	Western Bulldogs 16.15 (111)	def.	West Coast 13.11 (89)	Etihad Stadium (crowd: 17,019)	Match report
Sunday, 28 July (4:40 pm)	Sydney 16.14 (110)	def.	Richmond 9.9 (63)	SCG (crowd: 29,738)	Match report

=== Round 19 ===
	Round 19
Friday, 2 August (7:50 pm)	North Melbourne 15.6 (96)	def.	Geelong 13.8 (86)	Etihad Stadium (crowd: 33,584)	Match report
Saturday, 3 August (1:45 pm)	Greater Western Sydney 19.10 (124)	def.	Melbourne 12.15 (87)	Škoda Stadium (crowd: 8,308)	Match report
Saturday, 3 August (2:10 pm)	Hawthorn 9.12 (66)	def. by	Richmond 16.11 (107)	MCG (crowd: 64,324)	Match report
Saturday, 3 August (2:40 pm)	West Coast 20.10 (130)	def.	Gold Coast 17.11 (113)	Patersons Stadium (crowd: 32,140)	Match report
Saturday, 3 August (7:40 pm)	Brisbane Lions 16.12 (108)	def.	St Kilda 11.11 (77)	Gabba (crowd: 19,856)	Match report
Saturday, 3 August (7:40 pm)	Carlton 12.8 (80)	def. by	Fremantle 17.14 (116)	Etihad Stadium (crowd: 30,457)	Match report
Sunday, 4 August (1:10 pm)	Western Bulldogs 15.9 (99)	def. by	Sydney 21.8 (134)	Etihad Stadium (crowd: 22,647)	Match report
Sunday, 4 August (2:50 pm)	Adelaide 15.13 (103)	def. by	Port Adelaide 17.5 (107)	AAMI Stadium (crowd: 43,368)	Match report
Sunday, 4 August (4:40 pm)	Collingwood 20.13 (133)	def.	Essendon 7.12 (54)	MCG (crowd: 69,821)	Match report
Greater Western Sydney ended a 21-match losing streak with its win against Melbourne.

=== Round 20 ===
	Round 20
Friday, 9 August (7:50 pm)	St Kilda 7.14 (56)	def. by	Hawthorn 14.18 (102)	Etihad Stadium (crowd: 24,765)	Match report
Saturday, 10 August (1:45 pm)	Richmond 14.13 (97)	def.	Brisbane Lions 11.8 (74)	MCG (crowd: 46,961)	Match report
Saturday, 10 August (2:10 pm)	Geelong 20.9 (129)	def.	Port Adelaide 16.8 (104)	Simonds Stadium (crowd: 24,784)	Match report
Saturday, 10 August (4:40 pm)	Carlton 13.11 (89)	def. by	Western Bulldogs 16.21 (117)	Etihad Stadium (crowd: 31,126)	Match report
Saturday, 10 August (7:40 pm)	Gold Coast 13.12 (90)	def.	Melbourne 10.17 (77)	Metricon Stadium (crowd: 13,840)	Match report
Saturday, 10 August (7:40 pm)	Sydney 10.11 (71)	def. by	Collingwood 14.16 (100)	ANZ Stadium (crowd: 42,627)	Match report
Sunday, 11 August (1:10 pm)	Essendon 9.13 (67)	def. by	West Coast 18.12 (120)	Etihad Stadium (crowd: 32,595)	Match report
Sunday, 11 August (2:50 pm)	Adelaide 11.13 (79)	def.	North Melbourne 10.10 (70)	AAMI Stadium (crowd: 31,801)	Match report
Sunday, 11 August (2:40 pm)	Fremantle 24.13 (157)	def.	Greater Western Sydney 6.8 (44)	Patersons Stadium (crowd: 31,390)	Match report
Richmond secured a finals berth for the first time since 2001, ending a drought of 11 years without playing finals.; Fremantle's 113-point win against Greater Western Sydney stood until 2026 as the greatest winning margin in club history.

=== Round 21 ===
	Round 21
Friday, 16 August (7:50 pm)	Hawthorn 18.11 (119)	def.	Collingwood 12.12 (84)	MCG (crowd: 71,533)	Match report
Saturday, 17 August (1:45 pm)	Richmond 14.12 (96)	def. by	Carlton 16.10 (106)	MCG (crowd: 63,825)	Match report
Saturday, 17 August (1:40 pm)	Port Adelaide 16.17 (113)	def.	Gold Coast 14.12 (96)	AAMI Stadium (crowd: 18,703)	Match report
Saturday, 17 August (4:40 pm)	Essendon 9.16 (70)	def. by	North Melbourne 17.13 (115)	Etihad Stadium (crowd: 34,102)	Match report
Saturday, 17 August (5:40 pm)	West Coast 6.5 (41)	def. by	Geelong 16.11 (107)	Patersons Stadium (crowd: 34,394)	Match report
Saturday, 17 August (7:40 pm)	Brisbane Lions 18.15 (123)	def.	Greater Western Sydney 9.9 (63)	Gabba (crowd: 13,855)	Match report
Sunday, 18 August (1:10 pm)	Melbourne 5.8 (38)	def. by	Fremantle 20.13 (133)	MCG (crowd: 13,768)	Match report
Sunday, 18 August (3:20 pm)	Sydney 18.10 (118)	def.	St Kilda 8.11 (59)	SCG (crowd: 26,730)	Match report
Sunday, 18 August (4:40 pm)	Western Bulldogs 20.11 (131)	def.	Adelaide 17.12 (114)	Etihad Stadium (crowd: 17,159)	Match report

=== Round 22 ===
	Round 22
Friday, 23 August (7:50 pm)	Collingwood 15.11 (101)	def.	West Coast 5.9 (39)	MCG (crowd: 41,198)	Match report
Saturday, 24 August (1:15 pm)	Adelaide 18.12 (120)	def.	Melbourne 7.10 (52)	AAMI Stadium (crowd: 35,643)	Match report
Saturday, 24 August (2:10 pm)	North Melbourne 15.13 (103)	def. by	Hawthorn 17.15 (117)	Etihad Stadium (crowd: 33,039)	Match report
Saturday, 24 August (4:40 pm)	Geelong 13.14 (92)	def.	Sydney 7.6 (48)	Simonds Stadium (crowd: 28,459)	Match report
Saturday, 24 August (5:40 pm)	Fremantle 21.8 (134)	def.	Port Adelaide 9.6 (60)	Patersons Stadium (crowd: 35,565)	Match report
Saturday, 24 August (7:40 pm)	Carlton 9.22 (76)	def. by	Essendon 12.10 (82)	MCG (crowd: 53,630)	Match report
Sunday, 25 August (1:10 pm)	St Kilda 17.14 (116)	def.	Gold Coast 10.10 (70)	Etihad Stadium (crowd: 17,622)	Match report
Sunday, 25 August (3:20 pm)	Greater Western Sydney 6.6 (42)	def. by	Richmond 25.13 (163)	Škoda Stadium (crowd: 12,314)	Match report
Sunday, 25 August (4:40 pm)	Brisbane Lions 15.10 (100)	def.	Western Bulldogs 13.15 (93)	Gabba (crowd: 20,130)	Match report
West Coast's score of 5.9 (39) was its lowest ever at the MCG.

=== Round 23 ===
	Round 23
Friday, 30 August (7:50 pm)	Sydney 16.4 (100)	def. by	Hawthorn 17.10 (112)	ANZ Stadium (crowd: 37,980)	Match report
Saturday, 31 August (1:45 pm)	St Kilda 16.16 (112)	def.	Fremantle 6.5 (41)	Etihad Stadium (crowd: 22,476)	Match report
Saturday, 31 August (2:10 pm)	Geelong 15.22 (112)	def.	Brisbane Lions 17.9 (111)	Simonds Stadium (crowd: 27,467)	Match report
Saturday, 31 August (4:10 pm)	Port Adelaide 15.13 (103)	def. by	Carlton 15.14 (104)	AAMI Stadium (crowd: 45,127)	Match report
Saturday, 31 August (6:10 pm)	West Coast 5.13 (43)	def. by	Adelaide 19.15 (129)	Patersons Stadium (crowd: 29,416)	Match report
Saturday, 31 August (7:40 pm)	Essendon 9.11 (65)	def. by	Richmond 15.14 (104)	MCG (crowd: 60,979)	Match report
Sunday, 1 September (1:10 pm)	Gold Coast 22.14 (146)	def.	Greater Western Sydney 9.9 (63)	Metricon Stadium (crowd: 13,080)	Match report
Sunday, 1 September (3:20 pm)	Collingwood 17.12 (114)	def. by	North Melbourne 19.11 (125)	MCG (crowd: 50,958)	Match report
Sunday, 1 September (4:40 pm)	Western Bulldogs 16.11 (107)	def.	Melbourne 13.9 (87)	Etihad Stadium (crowd: 22,176)	Match report
Carlton's one point victory over Port Adelaide meant they finished the home and away season in 9th and subsequently replaced disqualified Essendon in the finals.; Assured of its third placed finish, Fremantle omitted eleven senior players to manage their fatigue for the finals, and consequently lost to sixteenth-placed St Kilda by 71 points. Following the season, the AFL formally clarified its integrity rules relating to such events: clubs could obtain permission on request to rest senior players at the end of the season, but the league would need to rule on a case-by-case basis that the club was not attempting to manipulate its finals draw.

== Win/loss table ==
Team	1	2	3	4	5	6	7	8	9	10	11	12	13	14	15	16	17	18	19	20	21	22	23	F1	F2	F3	GF	Ladder
Adelaide	**Ess** **−35**	BL +19	PA −9	**WB** **+52**	Carl −32	**Haw** **−11**	GWS +135	**StK** **+40**	NM +1	**Frem** **−7**	**Syd** **−77**	Rich −38	X	GCS +28	**WCE** **−6**	Coll −27	**Geel** **+2**	Frem −22	**PA** **−4**	**NM** **+9**	WB −17	**Melb** **+68**	WCE +86	X	X	X	X	11
Brisbane Lions	WB −68	**Adel** **−19**	GCS +2	NM −63	**Melb** **+28**	Syd −60	**WCE** **−26**	Ess +10	**Carl** **−13**	**Coll** **−49**	X	Frem −40	**Geel** **+5**	Haw −58	**GCS** **+33**	**NM** **+12**	Melb +19	PA −9	**StK** **+31**	Rich −23	**GWS** **+60**	**WB** **+7**	Geel −1	X	X	X	X	12
Carlton	**Rich** **−5**	Coll −17	Geel −16	WCE +24	**Adel** **+32**	**Melb** **+61**	StK −9	**PA** **+18**	BL +13	**GWS** **+94**	Ess −5	**Haw** **−16**	X	Syd −22	**Coll** **−41**	**StK** **+36**	NM +1	GCS +43	**Frem** **−36**	**WB** **−28**	Rich +10	**Ess** **−6**	PA +1	Rich +20	Syd −24	X	X	**8** (Note: Carlton finished 9th initially, but were promoted to 8th following the Essendon drug scandal.)
Collingwood	NM +16	**Carl** **+17**	**Haw** **−55**	Rich +34	Ess −46	**StK** **+26**	Frem −27	**Geel** **+6**	**Syd** **−47**	BL +49	Melb +83	**WB** **+34**	X	PA −35	Carl +41	**Adel** **+27**	GCS −7	**GWS** **+40**	**Ess** **+79**	Syd +29	Haw −35	**WCE** **+62**	**NM** **−11**	**PA** **−24**	X	X	X	**6**
Essendon	Adel +35	**Melb** **+148**	Frem +4	StK +37	**Coll** **+46**	**GWS** **+39**	Geel −28	**BL** **−10**	Rich +29	Syd −44	**Carl** **+5**	**GCS** **+43**	X	WCE +7	**PA** **+30**	WB +31	GWS +39	**Haw** **−56**	Coll −79	**WCE** **−53**	**NM** **−45**	Carl +6	**Rich** **−39**	X	X	X	X	9 (Note: Essendon finished 7th initially, but were relegated to 9th following the drug scandal.)
Fremantle	**WCE** **+28**	WB +28	**Ess** **−4**	Haw −42	**Rich** **+1**	GCS +45	**Coll** **+27**	Syd; 0	**Melb** **+90**	Adel +7	X	**BL** **+40**	**NM** **+38**	Geel −41	**StK** **+30**	WCE +28	Rich −27	**Adel** **+22**	Carl +36	**GWS** **+113**	Melb +95	**PA** **+74**	StK −71	Geel +15	X	**Syd** **+25**	Haw −15	**3**
Geelong	Haw +7	**NM** **+4**	**Carl** **+16**	Syd +21	WB +21	Rich +44	**Ess** **+28**	Coll −6	PA +48	**GCS** **+52**	GWS +59	X	BL −5	**Frem** **+41**	**Haw** **+10**	**Melb** **+68**	Adel −2	**StK** **+101**	NM −10	**PA** **+25**	WCE +66	**Syd** **+44**	**BL** **+1**	**Frem** **−15**	**PA** **+16**	Haw −5	X	**2**
Gold Coast	**StK** **+13**	Syd −41	**BL** **−2**	**PA** **−38**	GWS +44	**Frem** **−45**	Melb +60	**WB** **+32**	Haw −26	Geel −52	**NM** **+15**	Ess −43	X	**Adel** **−28**	BL −33	Rich −9	**Coll** **+7**	**Carl** **−43**	WCE −17	**Melb** **+13**	PA −17	StK −46	**GWS** **+83**	X	X	X	X	14
Greater Western Sydney	**Syd** **−30**	PA −56	**StK** **−72**	Melb −41	**GCS** **−44**	Ess −39	**Adel** **−135**	Haw −83	**WCE** **−100**	Carl −94	**Geel** **−59**	**PA** **−75**	X	NM −86	**WB** **−4**	Syd −129	**Ess** **−39**	Coll −40	**Melb** **+37**	Frem −113	BL −60	**Rich** **−121**	GCS −83	X	X	X	X	18
Hawthorn	**Geel** **−7**	WCE +50	Coll +55	**Frem** **+42**	**NM** **+3**	Adel +11	**Syd** **+37**	**GWS** **+83**	**GCS** **+26**	Melb +95	X	Carl +16	**WCE** **+20**	**BL** **+58**	Geel −10	PA +45	**WB** **+19**	Ess +56	**Rich** **−41**	StK +46	**Coll** **+35**	NM +14	Syd +12	**Syd** **+54**	X	**Geel** **+5**	**Frem** **+15**	**1**
Melbourne	**PA** **−79**	Ess −148	**WCE** **−94**	**GWS** **+41**	BL −28	Carl −61	**GCS** **−60**	Rich −34	Frem −90	**Haw** **−95**	**Coll** **−83**	X	StK −35	**WB** **+3**	**Syd** **−31**	Geel −68	**BL** **−19**	**NM** **−122**	GWS −37	GCS −13	**Frem** **−95**	Adel −68	WB −20	X	X	X	X	17
North Melbourne	**Coll** **−16**	Geel −4	**Syd** **−39**	**BL** **+63**	Haw −3	**PA** **+10**	WB +54	WCE −2	**Adel** **−1**	**StK** **+68**	GCS −15	X	Frem −38	**GWS** **+86**	**Rich** **+62**	BL −12	**Carl** **−1**	Melb +122	**Geel** **+10**	Adel −9	Ess +45	**Haw** **−14**	Coll +11	X	X	X	X	10
Port Adelaide	Melb +79	**GWS** **+56**	**Adel** **+9**	GCS +38	**WCE** **+5**	NM −10	**Rich** **−41**	Carl −18	**Geel** **−48**	WB −9	X	GWS +75	**Syd** **+18**	**Coll** **+35**	Ess −30	**Haw** **−45**	StK +5	**BL** **+9**	Adel +4	Geel −25	**GCS** **+17**	Frem −74	**Carl** **−1**	Coll +24	Geel −16	X	X	**7** (Note: Port Adelaide finished 8th initially, but were promoted to 7th following the Essendon drug scandal.)
Richmond	Carl +5	StK +17	**WB** **+67**	**Coll** **−35**	Frem −1	**Geel** **−44**	PA +41	**Melb** **+34**	**Ess** **−29**	WCE +41	X	**Adel** **+38**	WB +60	**StK** **+64**	NM −62	**GCS** **+9**	**Frem** **+27**	Syd −47	Haw +41	**BL** **+23**	**Carl** **−10**	GWS +121	Ess +39	**Carl** **−20**	X	X	X	**5**
St Kilda	GCS −13	**Rich** **−17**	GWS +72	**Ess** **−37**	**Syd** **−16**	Coll −26	**Carl** **+9**	Adel −40	**WB** **−9**	NM −68	**WCE** **−4**	X	**Melb** **+35**	Rich −64	Frem −30	Carl −36	**PA** **−5**	Geel −101	BL −31	**Haw** **−46**	Syd −59	**GCS** **+46**	**Frem** **+71**	X	X	X	X	16
Sydney	GWS +30	**GCS** **+41**	NM +39	**Geel** **−21**	StK +16	**BL** **+60**	Haw −37	**Frem**; **0**	Coll +47	**Ess** **+44**	Adel +77	X	PA −18	**Carl** **+22**	Melb +31	**GWS** **+129**	WCE +34	**Rich** **+47**	WB +35	**Coll** **−29**	**StK** **+59**	Geel −44	**Haw** **−12**	Haw −54	**Carl** **+24**	Frem −25	X	**4**
West Coast	Frem −28	**Haw** **−50**	Mel +94	**Carl** **−24**	PA −5	**WB** **+70**	BL +26	**NM** **+2**	GWS +100	**Rich** **−41**	StK +4	X	Haw −20	**Ess** **−7**	Adel +6	**Frem** **−28**	**Syd** **−34**	WB −22	**GCS** **+17**	Ess +53	**Geel** **−66**	Coll −62	**Adel** **−86**	X	X	X	X	13
Western Bulldogs	**BL** **+68**	**Frem** **−28**	Rich −67	Adel −52	**Geel** **−21**	WCE −70	**NM** **−54**	GCS −32	StK +9	**PA** **+9**	X	Coll −34	**Rich** **−60**	Melb −3	GWS +4	**Ess** **−31**	Haw −19	**WCE** **+22**	**Syd** **−35**	Carl +28	**Adel** **+17**	BL −7	**Melb** **+20**	X	X	X	X	15
Team	1	2	3	4	5	6	7	8	9	10	11	12	13	14	15	16	17	18	19	20	21	22	23	F1	F2	F3	GF	Ladder

+	Win	Qualified for finals
−	Loss	Eliminated

Bold – Home game
X – Bye
Opponent for round listed above margin

== Ladder ==
2013 AFL ladder
Pos	Team	Pld	W	L	D	PF	PA	PP	Pts	
1	Hawthorn (P)	22	19	3	0	2523	1859	135.7	76	Finals series
2	Geelong	22	18	4	0	2409	1776	135.6	72	Finals series
3	Fremantle	22	16	5	1	2035	1518	134.1	66	Finals series
4	Sydney	22	15	6	1	2244	1694	132.5	62	Finals series
5	Richmond	22	15	7	0	2154	1754	122.8	60	Finals series
6	Collingwood	22	14	8	0	2148	1868	115.0	56	Finals series
7	Port Adelaide	22	12	10	0	2051	2002	102.4	48	Finals series
8	Carlton	22	11	11	0	2125	1992	106.7	44	Finals series
9	Essendon	22	14	8	0	2145	2000	107.3	56 (Note: Essendon was relegated to ninth due to irregularities in its supplements program during the 2012 season.)	
10	North Melbourne	22	10	12	0	2307	1930	119.5	40	
11	Adelaide	22	10	12	0	2064	1909	108.1	40	
12	Brisbane Lions	22	10	12	0	1922	2144	89.6	40	
13	West Coast	22	9	13	0	2038	2139	95.3	36	
14	Gold Coast	22	8	14	0	1918	2091	91.7	32	
15	Western Bulldogs	22	8	14	0	1926	2262	85.1	32	
16	St Kilda	22	5	17	0	1751	2120	82.6	20	
17	Melbourne	22	2	20	0	1455	2691	54.1	8	
18	Greater Western Sydney	22	1	21	0	1524	2990	51.0	4	

Source: AFL Tables
Rules for classification: 1) points; 2) percentage; 3) number of points for.
(P) Premiers

=== Ladder progression ===
Numbers highlighted in green indicate that the team finished the round inside the top 8.
Numbers highlighted in blue indicates the team finished first on the ladder in that round.
Numbers highlighted in red indicates the team finished in last place on the ladder in that round.
Underlined numbers indicate that the team had a bye during that round.

Team ╲ Round	1	2	3	4	5	6	7	8	9	10	11	12	13	14	15	16	17	18	19	20	21	22	23
Hawthorn	0	4	8	12	16	20	24	28	32	36	36	40	44	48	48	52	56	60	60	64	68	72	76
Geelong	4	8	12	16	20	24	28	28	32	36	40	40	40	44	48	52	52	56	56	60	64	68	72
Fremantle	4	8	8	8	12	16	20	22	26	30	30	34	38	38	42	46	46	50	54	58	62	66	66
Sydney	4	8	12	12	16	20	20	22	26	30	34	34	34	38	42	46	50	54	58	58	62	62	62
Richmond	4	8	12	12	12	12	16	20	20	24	24	28	32	36	36	40	44	44	48	52	52	56	60
Collingwood	4	8	8	12	12	16	16	20	20	24	28	32	32	32	36	40	40	44	48	52	52	56	56
Port Adelaide	4	8	12	16	20	20	20	20	20	20	20	24	28	32	32	32	36	40	44	44	48	48	48
Carlton	0	0	0	4	8	12	12	16	20	24	24	24	24	24	24	28	32	36	36	36	40	40	44
Essendon	4	8	12	16	20	24	24	24	28	28	32	36	36	40	44	48	52	52	52	52	52	56	56
North Melbourne	0	0	0	4	4	8	12	12	12	16	16	16	16	20	24	24	24	28	32	32	36	36	40
Adelaide	0	4	4	8	8	8	12	16	20	20	20	20	20	24	24	24	28	28	28	32	32	36	40
Brisbane Lions	0	0	4	4	8	8	8	12	12	12	12	12	16	16	20	24	28	28	32	32	36	40	40
West Coast	0	0	4	4	4	8	12	16	20	20	24	24	24	24	28	28	28	28	32	36	36	36	36
Gold Coast	4	4	4	4	8	8	12	16	16	16	20	20	20	20	20	20	24	24	24	28	28	28	32
Western Bulldogs	4	4	4	4	4	4	4	4	8	12	12	12	12	12	16	16	16	20	20	24	28	28	32
St Kilda	0	0	4	4	4	4	8	8	8	8	8	8	12	12	12	12	12	12	12	12	12	16	20
Melbourne	0	0	0	4	4	4	4	4	4	4	4	4	4	8	8	8	8	8	8	8	8	8	8
Greater Western Sydney	0	0	0	0	0	0	0	0	0	0	0	0	0	0	0	0	0	0	4	4	4	4	4

== Finals series ==
Qualifying and elimination finals
Sep 6, MCG
1	Hawthorn	15.15 (105)
4	Sydney	7.9 (51)
Sep 8, MCG
5	Richmond	14.12 (96)
8	Carlton	18.8 (116)
Sep 7, MCG
6	Collingwood	9.9 (63)
7	Port Adelaide	12.15 (87)
Sep 7, Simonds Stadium
2	Geelong	9.18 (72)
3	Fremantle	12.15 (87)

Semi-finals
Sep 14, ANZ Stadium
Sydney	13.8 (86)
Carlton	8.14 (62)
Sep 13, MCG
Geelong	13.18 (96)
Port Adelaide	12.8 (80)

Preliminary finals
Sep 20, MCG
Hawthorn	14.18 (102)
Geelong	15.7 (97)
Sep 21, Patersons Stadium
Fremantle	14.15 (99)
Sydney	11.8 (74)

Grand final
Sep 28, MCG
Hawthorn	11.11 (77)
Fremantle	8.14 (62)

=== Week one ===
	Qualifying Finals
QF1: Friday, 6 September (7:50 pm)	Hawthorn 15.15 (105)	def.	Sydney 7.9 (51)	MCG (crowd: 59,615)	Match report
QF2: Saturday, 7 September (2:20 pm)	Geelong 9.18 (72)	def. by	Fremantle 12.15 (87)	Simonds Stadium (crowd: 32,815)	Match report

	Elimination Finals
EF2: Saturday, 7 September (7:45 pm)	Collingwood 9.9 (63)	def. by	Port Adelaide 12.15 (87)	MCG (crowd: 51,722)	Match report
EF1: Sunday, 8 September (3:20 pm)	Richmond 14.12 (96)	def. by	Carlton 18.8 (116)	MCG (crowd: 94,690)	Match report
The qualifying final between Geelong and Fremantle was just the second final to ever be played in Geelong in AFL/VFL history, with the previous final occurring in 1897 at Corio Oval.

=== Week two ===
	Semi-finals
SF2: Friday, 13 September (7:50 pm)	Geelong 13.18 (96)	def.	Port Adelaide 12.8 (80)	MCG (crowd: 52,744)	Match report
SF1: Saturday, 14 September (7:45 pm)	Sydney 13.8 (86)	def.	Carlton 8.14 (62)	ANZ Stadium (crowd: 37,980)	Match report

=== Week three ===
	Preliminary Finals
PF1: Friday, 20 September (7:50 pm)	Hawthorn 14.18 (102)	def.	Geelong 15.7 (97)	MCG (crowd: 85,569)	Match report
PF2: Saturday, 21 September (5:45 pm)	Fremantle 14.15 (99)	def.	Sydney 11.8 (74)	Patersons Stadium (crowd: 43,249)	Match report
Hawthorn defeated Geelong for the first time since the 2008 AFL Grand Final to end the 'Kennett curse'.

=== Week four ===
	Grand Final
GF: Saturday, 28 September (2:30 pm)	Hawthorn 11.11 (77)	def.	Fremantle 8.14 (62)	MCG (crowd: 100,007)	Match report
This was Fremantle's first grand final appearance.

== Attendances ==
=== By club ===
2013 AFL attendances
Club	Total	Games	Avg. Per Game
Adelaide	693,855	22	31,539
Brisbane Lions	503,994	22	22,909
Carlton	1,116,734	24	46,531
Collingwood	1,236,343	23	53,754
Essendon	1,036,044	22	47,093
Fremantle	819,016	25	32,761
Geelong	980,408	25	39,216
Gold Coast	389,966	22	17,726
Greater Western Sydney	345,730	22	15,715
Hawthorn	1,144,222	25	45,769
Melbourne	549,418	22	24,974
North Melbourne	634,033	22	28,820
Port Adelaide	648,854	24	27,036
Richmond	1,137,980	23	49,477
St Kilda	634,858	22	28,857
Sydney	798,556	25	31,942
West Coast	678,430	22	30,838
Western Bulldogs	513,729	22	23,351

=== By ground ===
2013 H&A ground attendances
Ground	Total	Games	Avg. Per Game
AAMI Stadium	665,808	22	30,264
ANZ Stadium	104,297	3	32,347
Aurora Stadium	52,950	4	13,238
Blundstone Arena	23,488	2	11,744
Cazaly's Stadium	11,197	1	11,197
Etihad Stadium	1,466,099	48	30,544
Gabba	231,909	11	21,083
MCG	2,346,893	45	52,153
Metricon Stadium	152,980	11	13,907
Patersons Stadium	773,485	22	35,158
Simonds Stadium	187,545	7	26,792
Škoda Stadium	57,969	7	8,281
StarTrack Oval	25,056	3	8,352
Sydney Cricket Ground	230,659	9	25,629
TIO Stadium	15,465	2	7,733
Westpac Stadium	22,546	1	22,546

== Awards ==
- The Norm Smith Medal was awarded to Brian Lake of Hawthorn.
- The Brownlow Medal was awarded to Gary Ablett Jr. of Gold Coast, who received 28 votes.
- The AFL Rising Star was awarded to Jaeger O'Meara of Gold Coast, who received 44 votes.
- The Coleman Medal was awarded to Jarryd Roughead of Hawthorn, who kicked 68 goals during the home and away season.
- The McClelland Trophy was awarded to Hawthorn for the second year in a row.
- The Wooden Spoon was "awarded" to Greater Western Sydney for the second year in a row.
- The AFL Players Association awards
  - The Leigh Matthews Trophy was awarded to Gary Ablett Jr. of Gold Coast for a record fifth time.
  - The Robert Rose Award was awarded to Joel Selwood of Geelong for the second year in a row and third time overall.
  - The Best Captain was awarded to Joel Selwood of Geelong.
  - The Best First-Year Player was awarded to Jaeger O'Meara of Gold Coast.
- The AFL Coaches Association Awards were as follows:
  - The Player of the Year Award was given to Scott Pendlebury of Collingwood, who received 96 votes.
  - The Allan Jeans Senior Coach of the Year Award was awarded to Ken Hinkley of Port Adelaide
  - The Assistant Coach of the Year Award was awarded to Robert Harvey of Collingwood.
  - The Development Coach of the Year Award was awarded to Chris Maple of Western Bulldogs.
  - The Support Staff Leadership Award was awarded to Stephen Wells of Geelong.
  - The Lifetime Achievement Award was awarded to George Stone.
  - The Best Young Player Award was awarded to Jeremy Cameron of Greater Western Sydney.
- The Jim Stynes Community Leadership Award was awarded to Zac Smith of Gold Coast.

=== Coleman Medal ===
- Numbers highlighted in blue indicates the player led the Coleman that round.
- Underlined numbers indicates the player did not play that round.

	Player	1	2	3	4	5	6	7	8	9	10	11	12	13	14	15	16	17	18	19	20	21	22	23	Total
1	Jarryd Roughead	1	2	3	4	1	1	4	5	3	3	0	4	5	4	2	5	3	4	0	5	1	4	4	68
2	Travis Cloke	4	0	5	7	2	4	0	1	3	0	3	5	0	2	5	2	2	3	5	2	2	3	5	66
3	Jeremy Cameron	1	3	1	1	3	6	3	4	3	2	4	2	0	0	3	3	4	7	4	4	2	0	2	62
4	Josh J. Kennedy	2	5	5	0	4	4	4	2	5	3	0	0	5	2	4	2	4	3	5	1	0	0	0	60
5	Lance Franklin	2	5	4	4	0	0	3	2	5	2	0	4	2	4	1	0	0	8	1	0	4	5	2	58
6	Jack Riewoldt	0	7	5	3	1	3	5	3	2	2	0	3	3	3	2	1	4	3	3	1	2	1	0	57
7	Lindsay Thomas	4	5	3	4	5	2	2	0	5	3	2	0	0	0	4	0	0	6	1	2	1	1	3	53
8	Nick Riewoldt	2	4	3	3	2	4	3	1	4	3	1	0	3	1	0	1	2	2	2	1	2	4	2	50
9	Tom Hawkins	2	3	3	3	0	2	2	4	6	2	2	0	3	2	0	2	2	5	1	1	0	0	1	46
10	Jay Schulz	4	1	1	4	0	3	3	2	3	0	0	3	1	3	0	1	1	2	2	2	3	1	4	44

=== Best and fairest ===
Club	Award name	Player	Ref
Adelaide	Malcolm Blight Medal	Rory Sloane	
Brisbane Lions	Merrett–Murray Medal	Joel Patfull	
Carlton	John Nicholls Medal	Kade Simpson	
Collingwood	Copeland Trophy	Scott Pendlebury	
Essendon	Crichton Medal	Brendon Goddard	
Fremantle	Doig Medal	Nathan Fyfe	
Geelong	Carji Greeves Medal	Joel Selwood	
Gold Coast	Club Champion	Gary Ablett Jr.	
Greater Western Sydney	Kevin Sheedy Medal	Jeremy Cameron	
Hawthorn	Peter Crimmins Medal	Josh Gibson	
Melbourne	Keith 'Bluey' Truscott Medal	Nathan Jones	
North Melbourne	Syd Barker Medal	Scott Thompson; Daniel Wells	
Port Adelaide	John Cahill Medal	Chad Wingard	
Richmond	Jack Dyer Medal	Daniel Jackson	
St Kilda	Trevor Barker Award	Jack Steven	
Sydney	Bob Skilton Medal	Jarrad McVeigh	
West Coast	John Worsfold Medal	Matt Priddis	
Western Bulldogs	Charles Sutton Medal	Ryan Griffen	

== Club leadership ==
Club	Coach	Captain(s)	Vice-captain(s)	Leadership group
Adelaide	Brenton Sanderson	Nathan van Berlo	Patrick Dangerfield, Scott Thompson	Sam Jacobs, Jason Porplyzia, Rory Sloane
Brisbane Lions	Michael Voss (Rds 1–20); Mark Harvey (Rds 21–23)	Jed Adcock, Jonathan Brown	Daniel Rich, Tom Rockliff	
Carlton	Mick Malthouse	Marc Murphy	Andrew Carrazzo, Kade Simpson	Nick Duigan, Jarrad Waite
Collingwood	Nathan Buckley	Nick Maxwell	Scott Pendlebury	Luke Ball, Dayne Beams, Harry O'Brien
Essendon	James Hird (Rds 1–22); Simon Goodwin (Rd 23)	Jobe Watson		Brendon Goddard, Dyson Heppell, Heath Hocking, Michael Hurley, Brent Stanton, Jason Winderlich, David Zaharakis
Fremantle	Ross Lyon	Matthew Pavlich		Hayden Ballantyne, Matt de Boer, Chris Mayne, David Mundy, Luke McPharlin, Aaron Sandilands
Gold Coast	Guy McKenna	Gary Ablett	Nathan Bock, Michael Rischitelli	Karmichael Hunt, Zac Smith, David Swallow
Greater Western Sydney	Kevin Sheedy	Phil Davis, Callan Ward	Tom Scully	
Geelong	Chris Scott	Joel Selwood	Jimmy Bartel	Tom Hawkins, Steve Johnson, James Kelly, Andrew Mackie, Harry Taylor
Hawthorn	Alastair Clarkson	Luke Hodge	Jordan Lewis, Jarryd Roughead	Lance Franklin, Sam Mitchell
Melbourne	Mark Neeld (Rds 1–12); Neil Craig (Rds 13–23)	Jack Grimes, Jack Trengove	Nathan Jones	Shannon Byrnes, Mitch Clark, Chris Dawes, James Frawley, Colin Garland, Jordie McKenzie
North Melbourne	Brad Scott	Andrew Swallow	Drew Petrie, Jack Ziebell	Brent Harvey, Scott Thompson, Daniel Wells
Port Adelaide	Ken Hinkley	Travis Boak	Brad Ebert	Robbie Gray, Hamish Hartlett, Jay Schulz, Jackson Trengove
Richmond	Damien Hardwick	Trent Cotchin	Brett Deledio, Daniel Jackson, Jack Riewoldt	Dylan Grimes, Ivan Maric
St Kilda	Scott Watters	Nick Riewoldt		David Armitage, Nick Dal Santo, Sean Dempster, Ben McEvoy, Jarryn Geary, James Gwilt, Leigh Montagna,
Sydney	John Longmire	Kieren Jack, Jarrad McVeigh		Jude Bolton, Adam Goodes, Josh Kennedy, Ryan O'Keefe, Ted Richards, Rhyce Shaw, Nick Smith
West Coast	John Worsfold	Darren Glass	Beau Waters	Dean Cox, Andrew Embley, Shannon Hurn, Josh Kennedy, Mark LeCras, Matt Priddis, Matt Rosa, Adam Selwood, Scott Selwood
Western Bulldogs	Brendan McCartney	Matthew Boyd		No official leadership group

== Club membership ==
2013 AFL membership figures
Club	Members	Change from 2012	% Change from 2012
Adelaide	46,405	▲1,300	▲2.80%
Brisbane Lions	24,130	▲3,368	▲16.22%
Carlton	50,564	▲4,764	▲10.40%
Collingwood	78,427	▲5,739	▲7.90%
Essendon	56,173	▲8,465	▲17.74%
Fremantle	43,880	▲962	▲2.24%
Geelong	42,884	▲2,679	▲6.66%
Gold Coast	12,502	▲1,298	▲11.59%
Greater Western Sydney	12,681	▲2,440	▲23.83%
Hawthorn	63,353	▲2,512	▲4.13%
Melbourne	33,177	▼2,282	▼6.44%
North Melbourne	34,607	▲1,184	▲3.54%
Port Adelaide	39,838	▲4,295	▲12.08%
Richmond	60,321	▲7,294	▲13.76%
St Kilda	32,707	▼2,733	▼7.71%
Sydney	36,358	▲6,485	▲21.71%
West Coast	58,501	▲1,124	▲1.96%
Western Bulldogs	30,209	▲202	▲0.67%
Total	756,717	▲49,096	▲6.94%

== Coach changes ==
Coach	Club	Date	Notes	Caretaker	New coach
Mark Neeld	Melbourne	17 June 2013	Sacked after a mid-season club review following a string of bad losses, including just five wins from 33 games.	Neil Craig	Paul Roos
Michael Voss	Brisbane Lions	13 August 2013	Stepped down following the club's decision not to renew his contract at the end of the season.	Mark Harvey	Justin Leppitsch
James Hird	Essendon	27 August 2013	Suspended by the AFL for twelve months for his involvement in the 2012 Essendon supplements scandal, effective immediately	Simon Goodwin	Mark Thompson
John Worsfold	West Coast Eagles	5 September 2013	Stepped down	None (end of regular season)	Adam Simpson
Kevin Sheedy	Greater Western Sydney	13 September 2013	Retired as part of a succession plan	None (end of regular season)	Leon Cameron
Scott Watters	St Kilda	1 November 2013	Sacked	None (end of regular season)	Alan Richardson

== Post-season ==
=== International Rules Series ===
The International Rules Series was played between Australia and Ireland for the first time since 2011. For the first time, the Australian team was represented by the Indigenous All Stars. As in previous years, two test matches were played, and the series was decided on aggregate. The series was held in Ireland, and was won by Ireland 2-0 and on an aggregate margin of 173-72 points.

	2013 International Rules Series
Saturday, 19 October (7:00pm)	Ireland 2.12.9 (57)	def.	Australia 1.7.8 (35)	Breffni Park, Cavan (crowd: 17,657)	Match report
Saturday, 26 October (7:00pm)	Ireland 6.22.14 (116)	def.	Australia 2.7.4 (37)	Croke Park, Dublin (crowd: 28,525)	Match report

== Notable events and controversies ==
=== Adelaide Crows–Kurt Tippett contract scandal ===
During the trade period leading up to the 2013 season, Adelaide Crows forward Kurt Tippett sought to be traded. During trade negotiations, information was uncovered which brought into question the legality under AFL rules of Tippett's 2009 contract extension with Adelaide. The AFL investigated Tippett's contract during October and November, and charged Tippett and Adelaide with a total of eleven charges relating to draft tampering and breaching the total player payments, including:

- Arranging a secret deal in which Tippett would be traded to a club of his choice at the end of 2012
- Direct payments of $100,000 outside the salary cap in each of 2011 and 2012
- Illegally arranging third-party deals in 2011 and 2012, resulting in Tippett receiving further money outside the salary cap in those years.

Adelaide was considered likely to incur a loss of draft picks, among other penalties, if found guilty, but the AFL Commission was yet to complete its hearing into the matter when the National Draft was held on 22 November 2012, so the club was permitted to participate in the draft as normal. However, on the day before the draft, the club voluntarily relinquished its highest two remaining selections (No. 20 and 54) as a "gesture of goodwill" ahead of the hearing.

The final hearing took place on 30 November, and Adelaide and Tippett pleaded guilty to all charges. Adelaide was stripped of its first and second round draft picks, and banned from taking any father-son selections, in the 2013 National Draft, and received a $300,000 fine. Tippett was suspended for the 2013 NAB Cup and 11 premiership matches, with a further suspended sentence of 11 matches, and received a $50,000 fine. Several senior Adelaide personnel were also punished by the league: chief executive Steven Trigg and former football manager John Reid were each fined $50,000 and banned from AFL functions for six months (with a further suspended sentence of six months), and current football manager Phil Harper was banned from AFL functions for two months with a four-month suspended sentence. In a separate hearing in January 2013, the AFL Players' Association revoked the accreditation of Tippett's manager, Peter Blucher, for at least one year.

=== Melbourne Football Club tanking scandal ===
Throughout the 2012/13 offseason, the league investigated the Melbourne Football Club over allegations that it had tanked during the latter part of the 2009 season – that is, that it had intentionally lost matches near the end of the season so that it would finish with no more than four wins, and therefore receive a priority draft pick. The league released its findings in February 2013, and found the club not guilty of tanking.

However, it did find two of Melbourne's then-senior staff members – senior coach Dean Bailey and general manager of football operations Chris Connolly – guilty of "acting in a manner prejudicial to the interests of the competition". This related most specifically to a meeting in July 2009, which became known colloquially as "the vault", in which Connolly allegedly openly discussed the potential benefits to the club of tanking. The guilty parties received the following penalties:

- Connolly, who was still at the club in 2013 but serving in a role outside the football department, was suspended outright from serving in any position at any club until 1 February 2014. Connolly was sacked by Melbourne in October 2013.
- Bailey, serving in 2013 as an assistant coach at the Adelaide Crows, was suspended from his position for the first sixteen weeks of the 2013 season, preventing him from having any contact with the Crows' playing group during that time.
- The Melbourne Football Club, which was complicit to the infraction in its capacity as Connolly's and Bailey's employer, was fined $500,000.

None of Melbourne, Connolly or Bailey contested these penalties.

=== Essendon Football Club supplements controversy ===
On 5 February the Essendon Football Club asked the Australian Sports Anti-Doping Authority (ASADA) to investigate the concerns over the clubs possible use of un-approved supplements during the 2012 season.

An internal independent review conducted by Dr. Ziggy Switkowski regarding the Essendon Football Club governance processes was released to the public on 6 May.

While ASADA investigated the legality of the supplements, the AFL separately investigated the administration of the club's supplements program, and charged the club and senior staff with bringing the game into disrepute. The charges focussed on the poor business practices within the program, including allowing "a culture of frequent, uninformed and unregulated use of the injection of supplements" at the club, incomplete record keeping which had made it impossible to determine with certainty whether or not players had been administered banned supplements, and for failing to guarantee the health and safety of its players in its program. On 27 August, five days before round 23 and after two days of discussions between the club and the league, the following penalties were imposed relating to these charges:

- Essendon was fined $2 million (staggered over three years); this was the largest fine imposed on a club in the history of Australian sport.
- Essendon was ruled ineligible to participate in the 2013 AFL finals series, achieved by relegating it to ninth position on the ladder.
- Essendon was stripped of draft picks in the following two drafts: in 2013, its first and second round draft picks were stripped; in 2014, it was stripped of the first and second round draft picks it would have received based on its finishing position, but was granted the last draft pick in the first round.
- Senior coach James Hird was suspended from any involvement in any football club for twelve months, effective immediately.
- Football operations manager Danny Corcoran was suspended from involvement in any football club for four months, with a further two-month suspended sentence, effective 1 October 2013.
- Senior assistant coach Mark Thompson was fined $30,000.
- Club doctor Bruce Reid had contested his charge at a hearing from the AFL Commission, which was on Thursday 29 August, 10:30pm EST.

The scandal was investigated over the following years, and ended with 34 players who were on the 2012 Essendon list being suspended for the entire 2016 AFL season as part of a partially offset two-year suspensions for using thymosin beta-4 during the scandal.

=== Adam Goodes–Eddie McGuire racism controversy ===
Late in the final quarter of the round 9 match between Collingwood and Sydney, Adam Goodes became the target of racial abuse in which a 13-year-old Collingwood supporter called him an "ape". Goodes pointed the supporter out to security following the incident, who subsequently evicted her from the ground; after the match, Collingwood president Eddie McGuire visited the Swans' rooms to apologise "on behalf of football", and stamped out that racism would not be tolerated by the Collingwood Football Club.

Five days later, McGuire was involved in another controversy involving Goodes on his Triple M Melbourne breakfast show, when he joked that Goodes could be used to promote the King Kong musical that was to be held in Melbourne, quickly apologising on air after making the reference. McGuire initially defended his comments by saying that the remark was simply "a slip of the tongue", but admitted to vilifying Goodes in an interview later in the day, albeit unintentionally.
