= Leigh Montagna =

Australian rules footballer

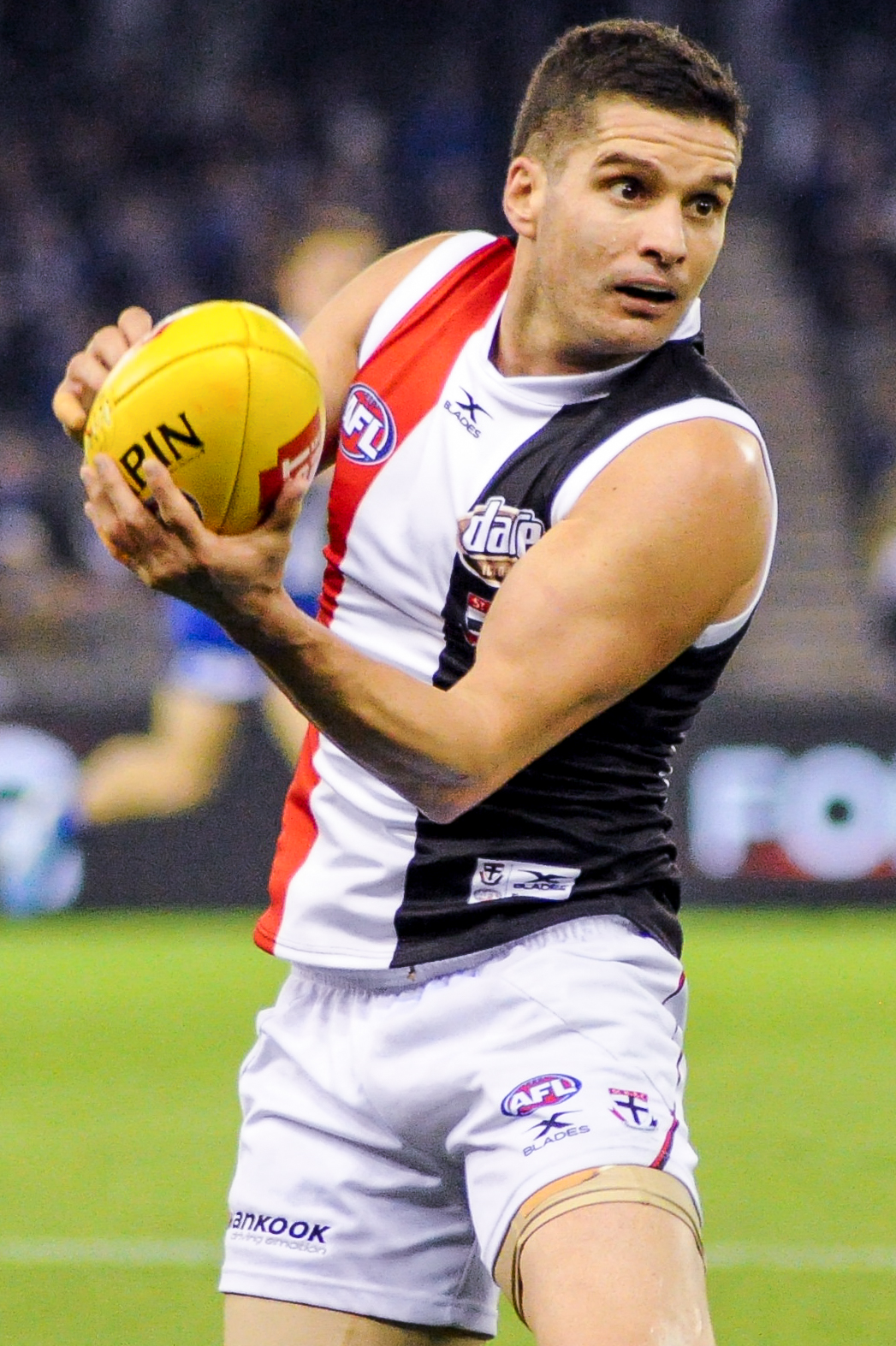
- Montagna in June 2017

Personal information
- Full name: Leigh Montagna
- Nickname: Joey
- Born: 2 November 1983 (age 43)
- Original team: Northern Knights (TAC Cup)
- Draft: No. 37, 2001 national draft
- Height: 178 cm (5 ft 10 in)
- Weight: 78 kg (172 lb)
- Position: Defender

Playing career^{1}
Years	Club	Games (Goals)
2002–2017	St Kilda	287 (155)

Representative team honours^{2}
Years	Team	Games (Goals)
2008–2015	Australia	5 (0)
- ^{1} Playing statistics correct to the end of 2017.^{2} Representative statistics correct as of 2010.

Career highlights
- 2× All-Australian team 2009, 2010; 2nd Trevor Barker Medal 2010, 2012; 3rd Trevor Barker Medal 2007, 2009, 2013; 2× Pre-season premiership 2004, 2008; 2003 AFL Rising Star nominee; 2014 Anzac Day clash Medallist (NZ Match)

Leigh "Joey" Montagna (Italian pronunciation: [monˈtaɲɲa]; born 2 November 1983) is a former professional Australian rules footballer who played for the St Kilda Football Club in the Australian Football League (AFL). A two time All-Australian, Montagna finished his career 7th on the all-time games list for St Kilda with 287 games and was top three in St Kilda's best and fairest—the Trevor Barker Award—on five occasions.

== AFL career ==
=== 2002–2006: Debut Seasons ===
Montagna was recruited from the Northern Knights in the TAC Cup under-18s as the number-37 draft pick in round 2 of the 2001 AFL draft by St Kilda. He played his first game wearing number 28 for St Kilda in round 2 of the 2002 AFL season against the Collingwood Football Club.

Montagna played in St Kilda's 2004 Wizard Home Loans Cup–winning side. St Kilda defeated Adelaide, Richmond and Essendon on the way to the grand final.

By this point, Montagna was establishing himself as a core part of the St Kilda team, setting a then club record for consecutive wins between round 1 and round 10 in the 2004 AFL season. Montagna did not play in the finals series, and St Kilda eventually fell six points short on the scoreboard in the Preliminary Final after qualifying for the finals series in third position.

Montagna's 50th AFL match for St Kilda was in Round 21 of the 2006 AFL season, a 50-point win against the Western Bulldogs. 2006 was a breakthrough season. Consolidating himself in the senior team, he went on to play 22 games for the season, leading the club in inside-50s, running bounces, and was top-five in tackles and hard-ball gets. He averaged over 19 disposals per game.

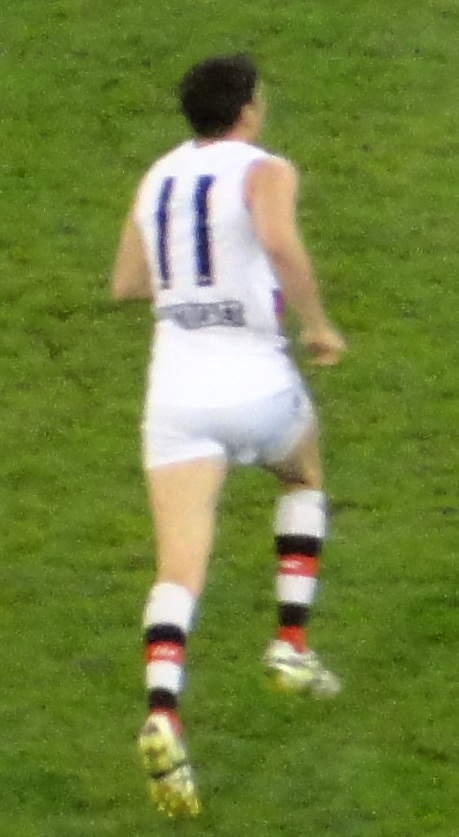

=== 2007–2011: Rise and Grand Final Losses ===
In Round 8, 2007, in a match against Hawthorn, Montagna suffered a broken jaw but only missed one week with the injury. Although 2007 was the first since 2003 that St Kilda had missed out on playing in the finals series, it was the season that saw Montagna become a top-tier AFL footballer. Montagna played consistently throughout the season and continued the improvement he had shown in 2006. He played an accountable and hard-running role through St Kilda's midfield, averaging 24 disposals and 3 tackles per game and kicking 10 goals for the year. Some of Montagna's highlights for the year included best-on-ground performances against the Kangaroos, Richmond and Hawthorn in the second half of the year. Montagna was rewarded for his efforts with a third-place finish in St Kilda's 2007 best and fairest.

Montagna played in St Kilda's 2008 NAB Cup–winning side—the club's third pre-season cup win. St Kilda defeated Richmond, Geelong and Essendon on the way to the grand final. 2008 saw Montagna continue to become vital in the St Kilda's midfield. St Kilda qualified fourth for the finals series and were defeated in the preliminary final by eventual premiers, Hawthorn. He finished the year with the most kicks in the competition and second for inside-50s. His season was rewarded by being selected for the first time to represent Australia against Ireland in the International Rules series.

Montagna's 100th game for St Kilda was in Round 2 of the 2009 AFL season against Adelaide at AAMI Stadium, which St Kilda won by 32 points. He played in 21 of 22 matches in the 2009 home-and-away season, where St Kilda won the minor premiership and qualified in first position for the finals series. A new club record of 19 consecutive wins between rounds 1 and 19 was set, the equal-third-best in league history. The club completed its best-ever home-and-away season with 20 wins and 2 losses. He played in the 2009 AFL Grand Final in which St Kilda lost by 12 points. Montagna averaged 27.9 disposals and 6.25 tackles in 2009 and was named in the 2009 All-Australian team for the first time. His season saw him become one of the best players in the competition. Considered a Brownlow Medal contender in 2009, Montagna took out a third-place finish in a tight St Kilda best-and-fairest count as well as earning an All-Australian position for the first time.

Montagna played 26 games in 2010, including the infamous draw and replay grand finals, averaging 28.6 possessions. He finished second in St Kilda's best-and-fairest award (Trevor Barker Medal), was selected in the AFL's All-Australian team for the second year in a row, finished in the top 10 in the Brownlow medal, and capped off the year by representing Australia in the International Rules series for the second time.

Leigh Montagna played his 150th game against Richmond in a draw in Round 2 of the 2011 AFL season at the Melbourne Cricket Ground.

=== 2012–2017: Club Rebuild and Retirement ===
The departure of Ross Lyon at the end of the 2011 season resulted in the beginning of a complete rebuild for St Kilda; and, despite the retirements and movement of many of his senior teammates, Montagna remained a model of consistency and a key leader through the rebuild. He played 102 out of 110 games in that period, averaging 26.4 disposals and finishing fourth in the club best and fairest as well as representing Australia on two more occasions.

2016 saw Montagna play across half-back for the first time in his career; he excelled in that role, averaging 29.2 disposals per game and helped lead the club to within percentage points of playing finals for the first time since 2011.

At the conclusion of the 2017 season, Montagna announced his retirement from the AFL. In February 2019, he was appointed as a Melbourne-based opposition analyst for Fremantle Football Club.

== Commentary ==
As of September 2024, Montagna was a National Basketball League commentator for ESPN. As of February 2025, he was an AFL commentator for Fox Footy.

== Statistics ==
Legend
G	Goals	K	Kicks	D	Disposals	T	Tackles
B	Behinds	H	Handballs	M	Marks

Season	Team	No.	Games	Totals							Averages (per game)						
Season	Team	No.	Games	G	B	K	H	D	M	T	G	B	K	H	D	M	T
2002	St Kilda	28	1	0	0	3	1	4	3	2	0.0	0.0	3.0	1.0	4.0	3.0	2.0
2003	St Kilda	28	12	12	3	73	52	125	30	18	1.0	0.3	6.1	4.3	10.4	2.5	1.5
2004	St Kilda	28	9	9	2	58	43	101	28	25	1.0	0.2	6.4	4.8	11.2	3.1	2.8
2005	St Kilda	11	8	6	3	78	43	121	35	19	0.8	0.4	9.8	5.4	15.1	4.4	2.4
2006	St Kilda	11	22	12	14	270	151	421	106	81	0.5	0.6	12.3	6.9	19.1	4.8	3.7
2007	St Kilda	11	21	10	12	339	163	502	108	75	0.5	0.6	16.1	7.8	23.9	5.1	3.6
2008	St Kilda	11	25	12	11	388	179	567	118	82	0.5	0.4	15.5	7.2	22.7	4.7	3.3
2009	St Kilda	11	24	8	19	399	271	670	123	150	0.3	0.8	16.6	11.3	27.9	5.1	6.3
2010	St Kilda	11	26	18	17	429	316	745	111	126	0.7	0.7	16.5	12.2	28.7	4.3	4.8
2011	St Kilda	11	21	13	10	335	171	506	88	94	0.6	0.5	16.0	8.1	24.1	4.2	4.5
2012	St Kilda	11	22	13	8	324	194	518	100	104	0.6	0.4	14.7	8.8	23.5	4.5	4.7
2013	St Kilda	11	21	16	8	395	226	621	101	82	0.8	0.4	18.8	10.8	29.6	4.8	3.9
2014	St Kilda	11	20	9	5	310	160	470	79	80	0.5	0.3	15.5	8.0	23.5	4.0	4.0
2015	St Kilda	11	17	8	9	277	209	486	85	82	0.5	0.5	16.3	12.3	28.6	5.0	4.8
2016	St Kilda	11	22	4	4	339	249	588	135	60	0.2	0.2	15.4	11.3	26.7	6.1	2.7
2017	St Kilda	11	16	5	1	235	165	400	96	59	0.3	0.1	14.7	10.3	25.0	6.0	3.7
Career			287	155	126	4252	2593	6845	1346	1139	0.5	0.4	14.8	9.0	23.9	4.7	4.0

== Personal life ==
In 2014, Montagna married his girlfriend of six years, Erinn Byrne. Montagna, being of Italian heritage, has said that his surname is pronounced the traditional Italian way: Mon-tan-ya. However, Montagna says that he personally prefers the alternate pronunciation: Mon-tag-na.

Montagna was involved in a police investigation regarding a woman's claims of being sexually assaulted by St Kilda teammate Stephen Milne at Montagna's house in 2004. No allegations were made against Montagna. Initially, charges were not filed against Milne, but he was later charged with several counts of rape. Montagna testified in defence of Milne, telling the Melbourne Magistrates Court that no one was pressured into having sex, asserting that he could identify those present in the darkened room and observed Milne and the alleged victim kissing and cuddling. He denied hearing any complaints or witnessing Milne forcing himself on the woman. Milne eventually pleaded guilty to one count of indecent assault.
