= Mark LeCras =

Australian rules footballer (born 1986)

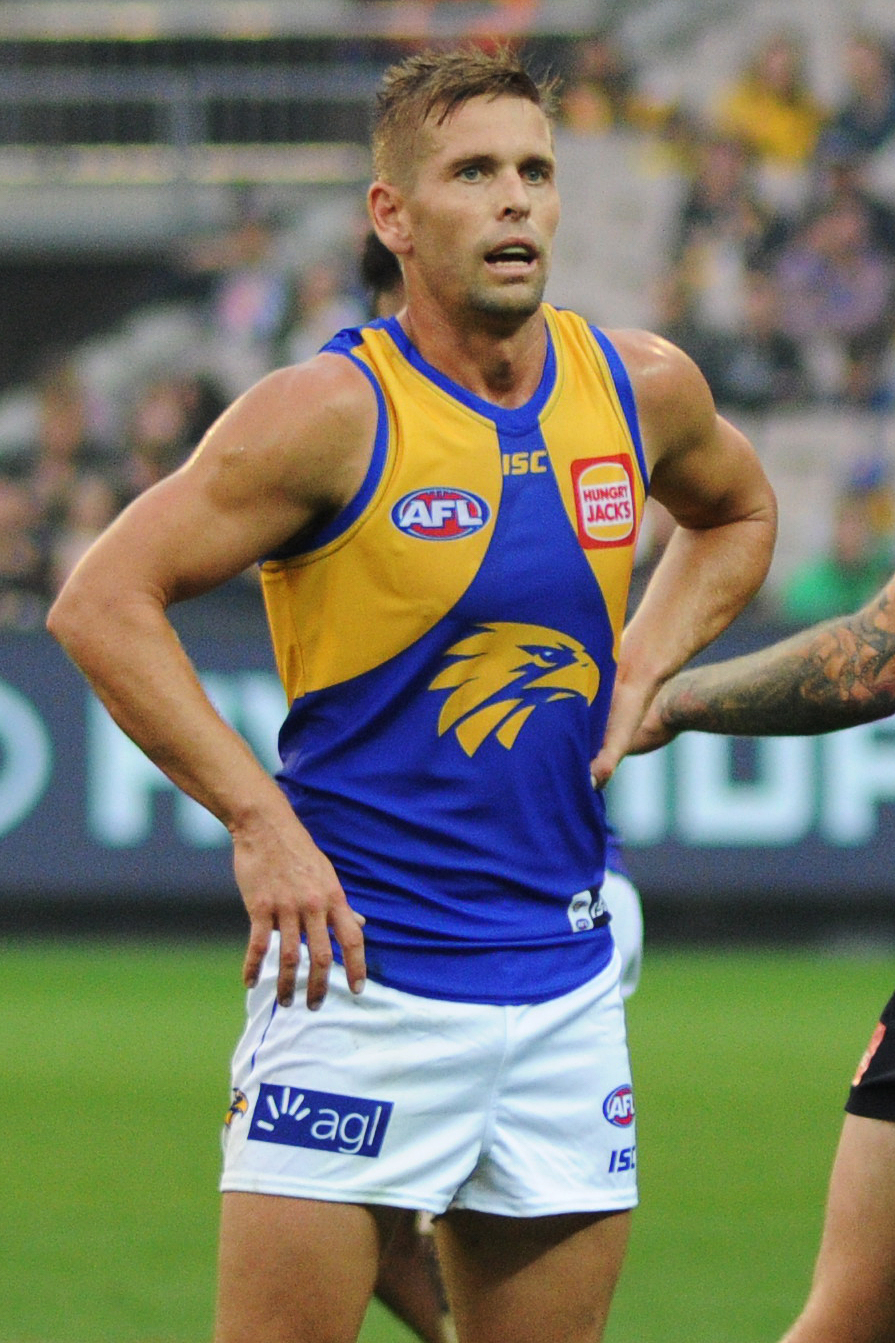
- LeCras playing for West Coast in April 2018

Personal information
- Full name: Mark Peter LeCras
- Nicknames: Lecca, The Frenchman
- Born: 30 August 1986 (age 40)
- Original team: Cervantes Football Club (CMCFL)/West Perth
- Draft: 37th pick, 2004 National Draft (West Coast)
- Height: 183 cm (6 ft 0 in)
- Weight: 80 kg (176 lb)
- Positions: Small forward, midfielder

Playing career^{1}
Years	Club	Games (Goals)
2005–2018	West Coast	219 (441)
- ^{1} Playing statistics correct to the end of end of 2018.

Career highlights
- AFL premiership player: 2018; All-Australian team: 2010; West Coast Eagles Club Champion Award: 2010; 2× West Coast Eagles leading goalkicker: 2009, 2010; AFL Rising Star nominee: 2006, 2007; Under-18 All-Australian team: 2004; Western Australia Under-18 team: 2004

Mark Peter LeCras (born 30 August 1986) is a former Australian rules footballer who played for the West Coast Eagles in the Australian Football League (AFL). He was predominantly used as a small forward, though he has occasionally played in the midfield. He won an AFL Premiership with West Coast in 2018, his last season. LeCras is the last West Coast Eagle born before the club's first game to play for them.

His father played senior football for East Fremantle in the West Australian Football League (WAFL), and his brother, Brent LeCras, played for North Melbourne in the AFL. His cousins, Toby, Ashley and Cory McGrath, also played senior football in the WAFL and AFL.

He made his debut for West Coast late in the 2005 season, and played his first full season in 2007. LeCras kicked 58 goals in 2009 and 63 goals in 2010, leading the club goalkicking in both years.

He won the club best and fairest in 2010, and was also named in the All-Australian team. In 2017, LeCras broke Phil Matera's club record for the most career goals by a small forward. In the same season he also became just the third West Coast player to kick 400 career goals, after Peter Sumich and Josh Kennedy.

He now works as a coastal reporter for Seven News Perth, and is also a part of Channel 7's commentary team for Australian Football League (AFL) matches in Western Australia.

== Early life ==
LeCras was born to Peter and Leonie LeCras on 30 August 1986. Originally from Cervantes, he began with the Cervantes Football Club in the Central Midlands Coastal Football League (CMCFL), but moved to Perth to attend Prendiville Catholic College, playing with Whitfords JFC and Quinns, before returning to Cervantes after his graduation.

He played for Western Australia at the 2003 and 2004 Under-18 Championships, and was named in the 2004 Under-18 All-Australian team. He played colts football for West Perth in the WAFL in 2003 and 2004, and was named as a half-forward flank in the Team of the Year in both seasons. LeCras made his senior debut for West Perth against Claremont in round 20 of the 2004 season, and played two further games for the season, in rounds 21 and 23.

== Career ==
=== Early career ===
LeCras was recruited by the West Coast Eagles with the 37th pick overall in the 2004 National Draft. After spending the first half of the season with West Perth, He made his debut for West Coast in round 10 of the 2005 AFL season, kicking two goals and recording 12 disposals. He played one more game before being dropped back to the WAFL, where he played the rest of the season.

He was recalled in 2006 for the Round 14 clash against Hawthorn, but only managed a total of 16 disposals in two games before being dropped and recalled for the Round 22 demolition of Richmond, where LeCras put in a surprise performance, booting 5 goals. LeCras placed fourth in the Sandover medal for the best player in the WAFL in 2006. The award was won by fellow West Coast Eagle player Matt Priddis. He fought his way back into the team in 2007, and had a stellar season, kicking 36 goals for the season.

In 2009, Mark LeCras kicked 58 goals in the home-and-away season, leaving him in All-Australian contention. Ultimately he missed out on selection. In round 13, 2009, he scored his 100th AFL career goal in West Coast's 20-point win against Hawthorn at Subiaco Oval. For the overall 2009 season, LeCras became the most potent forward in the team kicking 30 goals in the first 12 rounds, and 58 for the season, topping the Eagles' goalkicking list.

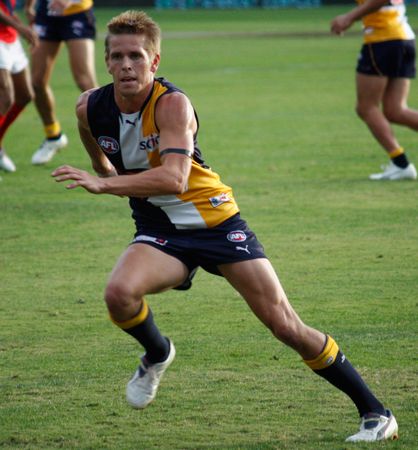
LeCras in 2009

=== 2010: All-Australian ===
In round 16 of 2010, LeCras kicked a personal best of 12 goals, doubling his previous record of 6, in an outstanding individual display against Essendon at Etihad Stadium. It broke the previous record of 11 (kicked by Stephen Milne) for the most goals kicked by an individual in a game at the stadium. This was one of a few highlights in a dark season for the Eagles in which they won the wooden spoon for the first time in its history. The performance also earned LeCras 226 points in the Herald Sun Supercoach competition, the highest score for the 2010 season. LeCras later finished Third in the Coleman Medal with 63 goals from 21 games, behind Jack Riewoldt and Barry Hall. On 10 September 2010, LeCras was awarded the "prestigious" award of the West Coast Eagles Club Champion. On 13 September, LeCras was selected at forward-pocket in the 2010 All-Australian team, the only player from the West Coast Eagles in the team. He was also nominated as one of the three contenders for goal of the year for his effort against Essendon in Round 16, one of twelve goals scored on the night, eventually losing out to Lance Franklin for the award.

=== 2011–2012: Midfield move and injury ===
After a strong pre-season, LeCras ruptured his anterior cruciate ligament (ACL) at a West Coast training session in February 2012, and was ruled out for the remainder of the season, opting to undergo a full knee reconstruction.

=== 2015: Return to form and Grand Final Heartache ===
2015 would see Mark LeCras to form as a small forward. Mark went onto kick 45 goals for the season.

In the 2015 AFL Grand Final between the West Coast Eagles Football Club and Hawthorn Football Club Mark would only kick one goal. Hawthorn Football Club won by 46 points. The 2015 would be Mark's first Grand Final appearance as a player. After being on the West Coast Eagles list when the West Coast Eagles lost the 2005 Grand Final and won the 2006 Grand Final. The 2018 Grand Final was Mark's second Grand Final appearance.

=== 2017–2018: Later years and premiership ===
Against Port Adelaide in round seven of the 2017 AFL season, LeCras kicked his 390th career goal, breaking Phil Matera's club record for the most goals kicked by a small forward. He kicked his 400th career goal in the round 17 Western Derby against Fremantle, in his 190th game, becoming only the third West Coast player to reach the milestone (after Peter Sumich and Josh Kennedy).

LeCras had an improved season and defied many critics who thought he had nothing left to give. He finished his career on a high with being part of the West Coast Eagles' premiership winning team in 2018, and announced his retirement after the AFL trade period.

In 2019, LeCras signed with West Coast's fierce local rivals, Fremantle, as a part-time specialist forwards coach, for the 2020 AFL season.

=== Honours and achievements ===
Team

- AFL premiership player: (West Coast Eagles) 2018
- McClelland Trophy (West Coast Eagles) 2006

Individual

- All-Australian team: 2010
- West Coast Eagles Club Champion Award: 2010
- 2× West Coast Eagles leading goalkicker: 2009, 2010
- AFL Rising Star nominee: 2006, 2007
- Under-18 All-Australian team: 2004
- Western Australia Under-18 team: 2004

== Statistics ==
Legend
G	Goals	K	Kicks	D	Disposals	T	Tackles
B	Behinds	H	Handballs	M	Marks

Season	Team	No.	Games	Totals							Averages (per game)						
Season	Team	No.	Games	G	B	K	H	D	M	T	G	B	K	H	D	M	T
2005	West Coast	19	2	2	0	12	1	13	7	3	1.0	0.0	6.0	0.5	6.5	3.5	1.5
2006	West Coast	19	4	5	6	23	12	35	15	6	1.3	1.5	5.8	3.0	8.8	3.8	1.5
2007	West Coast	2	19	36	19	122	57	179	58	43	1.9	1.0	6.4	3.0	9.4	3.1	2.3
2008	West Coast	2	11	23	8	87	28	115	49	8	2.1	0.7	7.9	2.5	10.5	4.5	0.7
2009	West Coast	2	21	58	26	194	98	292	87	48	2.8	0.2	8.6	6.2	14.8	2.6	1.6
2010	West Coast	2	21	63	24	213	73	286	97	36	3.0	1.1	10.1	3.5	13.6	4.6	1.7
2011	West Coast	2	22	47	29	237	121	358	92	86	2.1	1.3	10.8	5.5	16.3	4.2	3.9
2012	West Coast	2	0	0	0	0	0	0	0	0	0.0	0.0	0.0	0.0	0.0	0.0	0.0
2013	West Coast	2	15	30	27	191	46	237	80	46	2	1.8	12.7	3.1	15.8	5.3	3.1
2014	West Coast	2	15	30	14	175	97	272	69	63	2.0	0.9	11.7	6.5	18.1	4.6	4.2
2015	West Coast	2	24	45	31	284	156	440	122	66	1.9	1.3	11.8	6.5	18.3	5.1	2.8
2016	West Coast	2	23	38	27	269	107	376	127	75	1.7	1.2	11.7	4.7	16.3	5.5	3.3
2017	West Coast	2	19	32	21	190	80	270	94	45	1.7	1.1	10.0	4.2	14.2	4.9	2.4
2018†	West Coast	2	23	32	21	230	101	331	89	70	1.4	0.9	10.0	4.4	14.4	3.9	3.0
Career			219	441	253	2227	977	3204	986	595	2.0	1.2	10.2	4.5	14.6	4.5	2.7

== Personal life ==
LeCras married Emily Marshall in a private ceremony on 23 December 2011, with the reception held at Cottesloe Beach. They share two children.
