= Essendon v St Kilda (2009 AFL season) =

2009 AFL Round 20
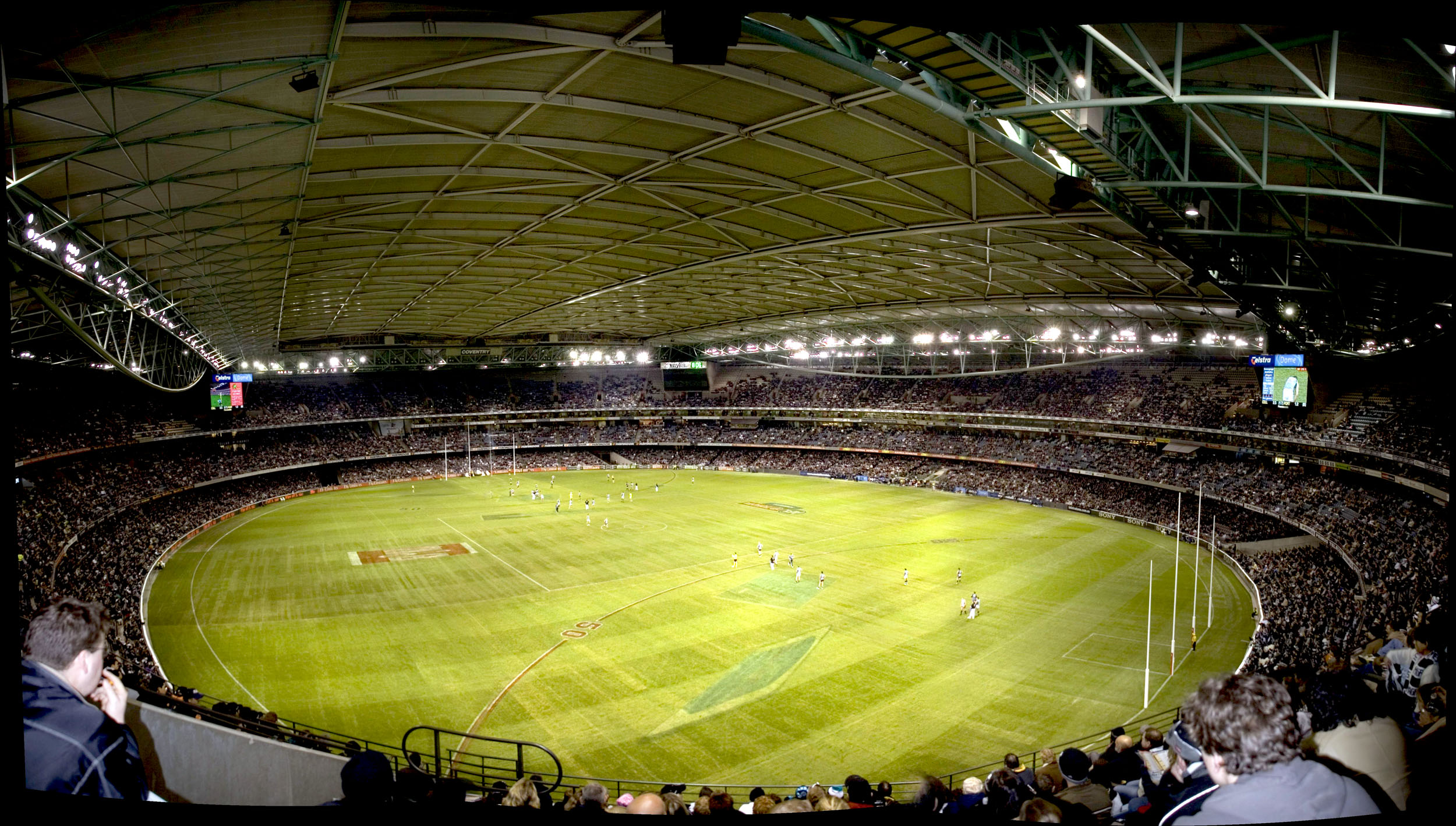

Essendon	St Kilda
16.14 (110)	16.12 (108)
	1	2	3	4
ESS	3.3 (21)	10.6 (66)	16.9 (105)	16.14 (110)
STK	4.2 (26)	7.4 (46)	11.10 (76)	16.12 (108)
- Date: 16 August 2009
- Stadium: Etihad Stadium
- Attendance: 41,410
- Umpires: Shaun Ryan, Shane Stewart, Stefan Grun

Accolades
- Best on Ground: Jobe Watson (Essendon)

Broadcast in Australia
- Network: Fox Sports
- Commentators: Brian Taylor, James Hird

In Round 20 of the 2009 AFL season, an Australian rules football home-and-away match was played between Essendon and St Kilda at Etihad Stadium on 16 August 2009.

St Kilda went into the match in first place on the ladder, having won its first nineteen matches of the season – a club record – while Essendon sat in ninth place, requiring at least two wins from its final three matches to qualify for its first finals series since 2004 AFL season. The match saw Essendon win by two points, inflicting St Kilda's first defeat of the season and also preventing the Saints from equalling their record of twenty consecutive wins set in 2000.

== Background ==
Having won its first nineteen matches of the season, and with a three-game gap on second-placed Geelong (whom it had defeated by six points in round fourteen, St Kilda had the opportunity to clinch its first minor premiership since 1997 if it could defeat Essendon, against whom they had won their previous three matches dating back to 2008, including a 108-point win in the final match of that regular season which saw it claim a top-four berth at the expense of Adelaide. At stake was also the opportunity to equal Essendon's record of 20 consecutive victories to start the season, which was set in 2000.

Essendon, meanwhile, had lost its previous four matches to drop to ninth on the ladder, and still needed to win two of its final three matches to qualify for the eight-team finals series for the first time since 2004.

This was to be the second meeting between the two teams in 2009, with St Kilda winning the earlier season match-up by 19 points at Etihad Stadium in round eight.

== Teams ==
Essendon captain Matthew Lloyd missed the match with a heel injury.

In the lead-up to the match, St Kilda recalled seven players, including captain Nick Riewoldt, Nick Dal Santo, Brendon Goddard and Lenny Hayes after they were all rested from their 25-point win over Hawthorn the previous round.

== Match summary ==
=== First quarter ===
St Kilda, whose captain Nick Riewoldt was among those recalled to the side after he was rested from their round 19 match against Hawthorn, kicked the opening three goals to lead by 19 points early in the quarter before Essendon kicked three of the next four goals to trail by only five points at quarter-time.

=== Second quarter ===
Essendon made its move in the second quarter, kicking seven of the ten goals scored to lead by 20 points at half-time, thus marking the fourth time St Kilda had trailed at half-time in the 2009 season.

=== Third quarter ===
Essendon kicked five of the first six goals in the third quarter to extend its lead to a game-high 43 points, however, St Kilda would kick three of the next four goals, two of them to Stephen Milne, to reduce the three-quarter-time deficit to 29 points.

=== Fourth quarter ===
St Kilda kicked the only five goals of the final quarter to reduce the margin to just one point entering time-on, before two behinds to Essendon saw the lead increase to three points as the match reached its conclusion. St Kilda captain Nick Riewoldt had the chance to win the game with a 45-metre set shot after the final siren, but he missed to the right, ensuring Essendon escaped with a two-point victory, despite being held goalless in the final quarter. The loss ended St Kilda's 19-game winning streak, which as of 2022 stands as the longest in St Kilda's history and the equal fifth-longest by any club in VFL/AFL history.

== Scoreboard ==
Round 20, 2009
Sunday, 16 August (4:40 pm)	Essendon	def.	St Kilda	Etihad Stadium (crowd: 41,410)	Match report
3.3 (21); 10.6 (66); 16.9 (105); 16.14 (110)	Q1; Q2; Q3; Final	4.2 (26); 7.4 (46); 11.10 (76); 16.12 (108)	Umpires: Shaun Ryan, Shane Stewart, Stefan Grun; Television broadcast: Fox Sports
Monfries 4, Neagle 2, Ryder 2, Prismall 2, Fletcher, Hurley, McPhee, Watson, Atkinson, Lovett	Goals	Milne 3, Koschitzke 3, Schneider 3, Fisher 2, Riewoldt 2, Armitage 2, Dal Santo
Watson, Monfries, Pears, Atkinson, Hurley, Stanton, Prismall, McVeigh	Best	Koschitzke, Hayes, Dal Santo, Montagna, Milne, Gram
Reimers (general soreness) replaced in selected side by Davey, Fletcher (hamstring), Dempsey (hamstring), Stanton (quad/hip), Ryder (knee), Watson (leg soreness)	Injuries

Brownlow Medal votes
3 J. Watson (Essendon); 2 A. Monfries (Essendon); 1 J. Koschitzke (St Kilda)

== Aftermath ==
Despite losing to North Melbourne the following week, St Kilda clinched the minor premiership in round 21 following Geelong's loss to the Western Bulldogs earlier in the round.

Though the victory put Essendon into the top eight at the conclusion of round 20, they lost to Fremantle by 54 points at Subiaco Oval the following week, thus setting up a winner-takes-all showdown against Hawthorn for the last remaining berth in the top eight in Round 22. Essendon won this match by 17 points to not only clinch eighth place on the ladder, but also put an end to Hawthorn's premiership defence.

Essendon won the following three encounters against St Kilda, including in round three, 2011, when Nick Riewoldt played his 200th AFL game. St Kilda did not defeat Essendon again until round 15, 2012, when it won by 71 points in Stephen Milne's 250th AFL game.
