= St Kilda v Geelong (2009 AFL season) =

2009 AFL Round 14

St Kilda	Geelong
14.7 (91)	13.7 (85)
	1	2	3	4
STK	5.3 (33)	8.4 (52)	10.5 (65)	14.7 (91)
GEE	2.2 (14)	5.5 (35)	8.7 (55)	13.7 (85)
- Date: Sunday, 5 July (3:10pm)
- Stadium: Etihad Stadium
- Attendance: 54,444

Broadcast in Australia
- Network: Seven Network

In round 14, 2009, an Australian Football League home-and-away match was played between St Kilda and Geelong at Etihad Stadium in Melbourne on 5 July 2009.

Both clubs entered the match undefeated with 13–0 records for the year. St Kilda won the classic, close encounter by six points, with ruckman Michael Gardiner kicking the winning goal inside the final two minutes. The attendance of 54,444 stands as the highest ever at Etihad Stadium for an Australian rules football match, and the match is considered one of the best home-and-away matches in the league's history.

== Background ==
In the 2009 AFL season, St Kilda (the Saints) and Geelong (the Cats) were the two dominant clubs by a considerable margin. The only home-and-away match between the two was scheduled for round 14, by which time both clubs were undefeated with 13–0 records and four wins ahead of third place. Undefeated teams had never previously played each other so late in a VFL/AFL season, the previous latest being in round 8, 1991 between two 6–0 teams. The match was one of the most heavily promoted home-and-away games in the league's history.

The game held greater contextual significance than just the teams' undefeated records: Geelong and St Kilda were two of the era's best teams at the peaks of their abilities, and were separately dominating with their own revolutionary styles of play:

- Geelong was in its tenth year under coach Mark Thompson. It had been the pre-eminent team since 2007, and had won 55 of its last 58 matches including the 2007 premiership. Geelong had perfected a style of high-possession football, studded with star midfielders adept at running, carrying and executing chains of handpasses through the corridor of the ground, and it was consistently setting new league records for its high disposal counts. It was also routinely recording more handpasses than kicks; no team had ever previously done this successfully – having fewer kicks than handpasses was previously seen as a statistical marker of a struggling team – but Geelong had adapted the novel style into an attacking weapon which had made it into the league's highest scoring team. It had a forward-line built on a mix of star goalsneaks and capable key position players, and had some of the league's best key defenders.
- St Kilda was in its third year under coach Ross Lyon, and after reaching three preliminary finals in the previous five years was enjoying a break-out season. Its success was built on full team defense, unrelenting tackle pressure at the ball-carrier and contested ball, a style which Lyon had designed primarily to counter Geelong's high-possession game. St Kilda's 2009 team was arguably the best defensive team of the modern era; it conceded only 64 points per game in the home-and-away season which, as of 2022, remains the lowest by any team in a conventional season since 1966.^{N 1} St Kilda's ball movement tended to be via the wings and flanks rather than the corridor, with a focus on turnover avoidance with ball in hand. It ran a more conventional tall forward-line than Geelong, with keys Nick Riewoldt and Justin Koschitzke near the peaks of their careers.

Geelong was a warm favourite in betting markets, attracting odds of $1.50–$1.57 through the week to St Kilda's $2.40–2.50. Betting volumes on the match were lower than typical, and a draw – which was backed in from $51 to $20 and came very close to eventuating – would have been by far the worst result for bookmakers.

== Match arrangements ==
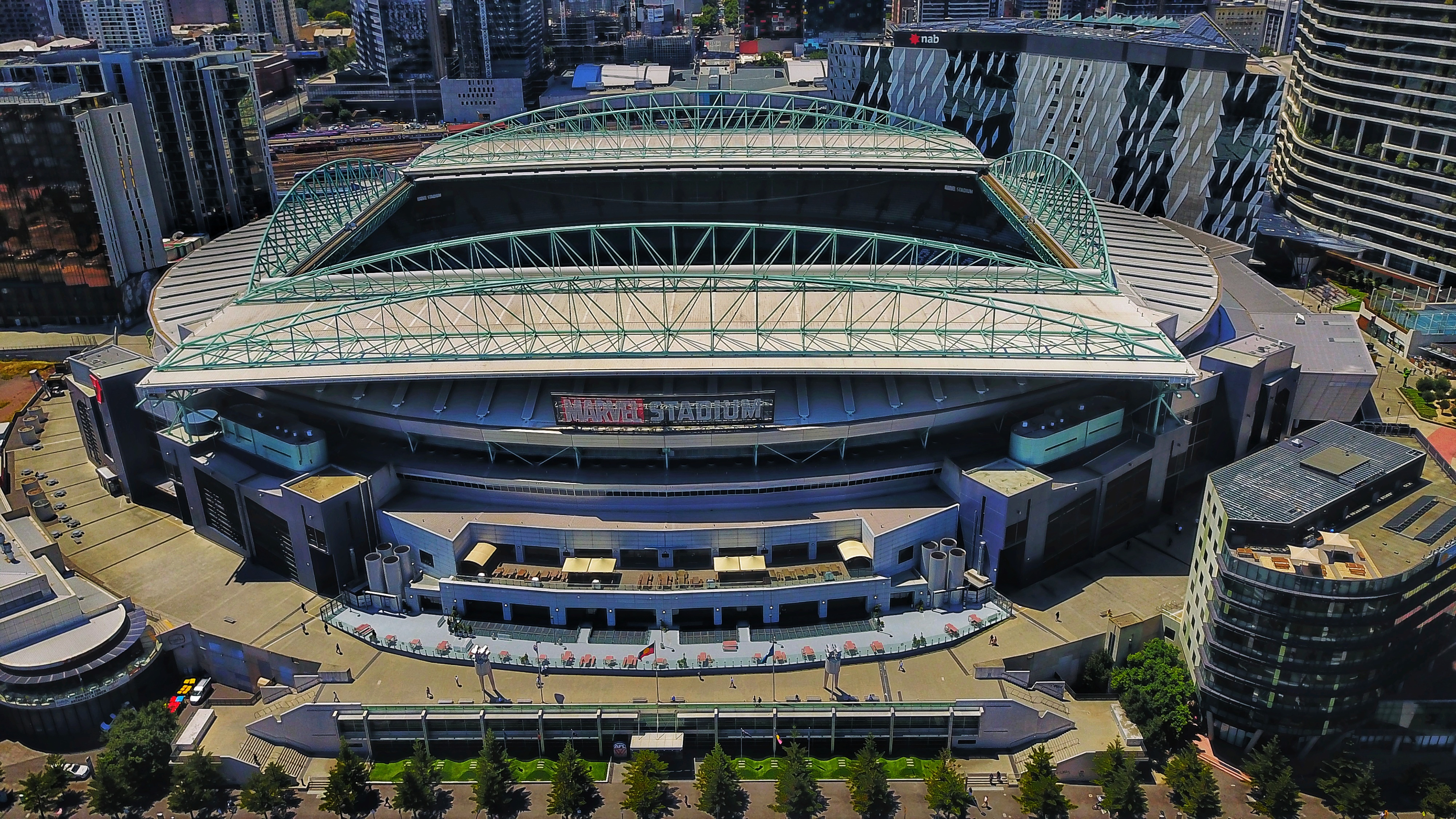
Match venue Etihad Stadium.

The match was a St Kilda home game, and was played at its primary home ground, Etihad Stadium. As early as May, the AFL opened negotiations with stadium managers, seeking to relocate the match from Etihad Stadium (capacity 55,000) to the Melbourne Cricket Ground (capacity 100,000), under a seldom-used 'best-fit' policy in place for the relocation of high-crowd matches. The relationships between the AFL and both stadium managements were strained for unrelated reasons at that time; and ultimately no deal to relocate was reached, since the expense of compensating Etihad Stadium, reticketing the match, and changing signage at the Melbourne Cricket Ground to satisfy Etihad Stadium advertisers, would have resulted in a $250k loss. Tickets to the match sold out by 22 June; it was not a declared event under Victorian anti-scalping laws, and some resold tickets fetched hundreds of dollars.

The match was originally scheduled to commence at 2:10pm, with a delayed telecast on the Seven Network to commence at 3pm in Melbourne, which was the standard scheduling for Sunday afternoon matches at the time. There was public demand for a live telecast of the match. For much of broadcast history, it had been the policy to protect gate takings by restricting live VFL/AFL telecasts into the home state unless the match was sold-out; this policy no longer existed in 2009, with the networks having the right to broadcast any match live, but it remained Seven Melbourne's preference to broadcast its Sunday matches delayed, as a ratings lead-in to its 6:00 pm news. To balance both expectations, the AFL changed the match's start time to 3:10pm, allowing both a live broadcast and a news lead-in. This was a once-off change until the 2012 broadcast deal; since then, the free-to-air broadcaster's Sunday afternoon match has always been a live broadcast at or around 3:10–3:20pm EST.

While the match was televised live in Melbourne, audiences in Sydney and Brisbane had the match delayed until midnight due to the AFL broadcasting contract requiring a Foxtel-produced match between the Sydney Swans and North Melbourne to be televised in those markets instead.

== Match summary ==
The match was played under the closed roof at Etihad Stadium. The sell-out crowd of 54,444 set a new record for an Australian rules football match at the stadium, with a majority supporting the home team St Kilda. Both teams lost important players to injury shortly before the match: veteran St Kilda defender Max Hudghton, who spent the week under an injury cloud after an incident the previous week, was omitted from the team for Raphael Clarke at the selection table; and Geelong goalsneak Steve Johnson withdrew on the morning of the game with a hip injury, and he was replaced by emergency Simon Hogan.

=== First quarter ===
St Kilda dominated the opening phases of the game, and kicked its first goal after two minutes, when tagger Clinton Jones capitalised on a fumble by Geelong's Gary Ablett Jr., whom he tagged throughout the game. Two minutes later, Nick Riewoldt kicked the second goal after taking a courageous mark with the flight of the ball in the goal square. St Kilda cleared the ensuing centre bounce, and a long set shot by Justin Koschitzke was touched back into play by the Geelong defenders on the goal line, where it was gathered and kicked through for a close range goal by Michael Gardiner. St Kilda missed a strong chance for a fourth goal two minutes later from a turnover at half-forward; then kicked a fourth goal by a long set shot from Koschitzke, to lead 4.1 (25) to no score after only ten minutes of play.

Geelong gained some repeat forward-50 entries over the next five minutes, but St Kilda's defense was strong, and Geelong managed only a behind rushed from a marking contest in the 12th minute. St Kilda rebounded, and after forcing a turnover by Cameron Ling trying to clear the ball, Sam Fisher kicked a goal on the run in the 18th minute to extend the margin to 30 points. Adam Schneider narrowly missed a chance to kick St Kilda's sixth goal two minutes later, extending the margin to a game high 31 points: St Kilda 5.2 (32), Geelong 0.1 (1).

Geelong kicked its first two goals late in the quarter, in both cases benefitting from free kicks. In the 26th minute, after the kick-in from another St Kilda behind, the play ended with a mark to Ablett 65m from goal; he received a 50-metre penalty after Jones cribbed over the mark, and kicked Geelong's first goal from 15m. Then in the 30th minute, Travis Varcoe received possession from a ball-up at half forward and initially snapped a behind on the run from 35m; but, he received a free kick after being illegally bumped by Zac Dawson after the kick and kicked a goal from the second chance. St Kilda played tempo football to finish the quarter, and led 5.3 (33) to 2.2 (14) by 19 points at quarter time.

=== Second quarter ===
Geelong won early ruck contests, but it was St Kilda who scored first, Riewoldt kicking a goal from 50m in the second minute. Geelong missed two relatively easy shots over the following minute: Simon Hogan missing a snap shot under minimal pressure, and Cam Mooney foregoing a 15m set shot from a 60° angle in favour of passing to Jimmy Bartel who missed from a worse position (45m, 30° angle); Mooney, a 181-game veteran, came under heavy criticism from analysts and his coach for his decision to pass. St Kilda went coast-to-coast from the kick-in after Bartel's behind, Andrew McQualter kicking the goal from 35m to extend the margin to 29 points. Despite the margin, gameplay statistics had evened up since St Kilda's fast start, and at this point the teams each had 19 inside-50s and Geelong led the clearances 14–10. Early in the second quarter, Geelong defender Darren Milburn injured his ankle, and he shifted into the forward line.

Geelong kicked the next two goals: a rapid chain of handpasses through the centre of the ground was finished by Milburn with a 45m goal in the 13th minute; and, after Varcoe caught Jason Blake holding the ball at St Kilda's half-forward, a quick rebound ended with a goal to Ablett from 15m in the 17th minute. Adam Schneider kicked a goal for St Kilda from the ensuing centre bounce. There followed several minutes of end-to-end play, before Joel Corey kicked the last goal of the quarter in the 24th minute. St Kilda held territory in the final minutes of the quarter missed two late chances – Leigh Montagna unable to convert a snap shot after Geelong's James Kelly turned over the ball deep in St Kilda's forward line; and Luke Ball taking a snap shot straight out of the ruck with six seconds remaining for no score. Geelong won the even quarter by two points, and St Kilda 8.4 (52) led Geelong 5.5 (35) by 17 points at half time.

=== Third quarter ===
Geelong opened the strongest in the third quarter, with six inside-50s to one in the first seven minutes, but managed only two behinds – both of them long bombs by Paul Chapman which were touched on the goal line. Then, in the 8th minute against the run of play, St Kilda launched an attack from a free kick, which ended with a mark and goal by Gardiner from 30m, extending the margin to 21 points.

Geelong kicked the next three goals in less than four minutes to narrow the margin to only three points: in the 13th minute, a handpass chain through traffic ended with 50m set shot goal to Andrew Mackie; the ensuing centre clearance, won after a few repeat bounces, ended with a 50m set shot goal by Mooney; and the following centre bounce was won straight forward by Geelong, ending with a bouncing 40m snap shot by Joel Selwood which took an erratic bounce through for goal. St Kilda had the better of the last ten minutes of the quarter, the only goal kicked by Riewoldt from a 60m shot in the 27th minute, to extend the margin to ten points. Geelong won the quarter by seven points, although was the much stronger team for the quarter with a 15–8 advantage in inside-50s, and St Kilda led 10.5 (65) to Geelong 8.7 (55).

=== Final quarter ===
Geelong had the first chance, with Selwood taking a 50m shot at the end of a chain of handpasses but failing to score. St Kilda rebounded, and Koschitzke converted a 50m set shot in the third minute. St Kilda held territory over the following minutes, with Gardiner effective across the centre of the ground at marking and turning over Geelong's rebound attempts. An accurate snap shot by St Kilda's Stephen Milne was rushed through for a behind by Geelong's Harry Taylor in the 5th minute. In the 9th minute, Geelong conceded an unlucky free kick, when Corey handpassed the ball onto team-mate Taylor's legs and it ricocheted out of bounds on the full near St Kilda's behind post; Montagna passed the free kick short to Gardiner, who kicked his third goal from 15m. Geelong narrowly averted another goal in the tenth minute, tackling Ball in the goal square and clearing for no score. By this time, St Kilda had extended the margin to 23 points.

End-to-end play continued, but over the next ten minutes only Geelong made the most of its opportunities. In the 13th minute, a phase of broken play ended with 40m goal to Geelong's Max Rooke. St Kilda won the next centre clearance, but Schneider failed to score from a 35m snap shot. A sustained period of St Kilda attack ended when Geelong marked at centre half-back and won a 50-metre penalty; this was handpassed to Chapman, whose 70m long bomb bounced on the kick-off line and eluded three defenders through for a goal in the 17th minute. The next centre bounce ended with Mooney, who kicked a 50m set shot goal to narrow the margin to five points. St Kilda steadied next, Milne converting a 40m set shot in the 21st minute, and Nick Dal Santo missing a 25m snap shot after the ensuing centre clearance to extend the margin to 12 points. Geelong rebounded coast-to-coast from the kick-in, finishing with a 20m set shot goal by Darren Milburn in the 22nd minute. Two minutes later, Geelong's Mathew Stokes kicked a goal from 35m minutes to level the scores with 4:51 of game time remaining.

The final five minutes saw end-to-end play, with fatigue setting in and looser marking of opponents. Milne just dropped a mark right in front of St Kilda's goal with 3:10 remaining, and Geelong cleared. In a controversial moment with 2:35 remaining, Corey was illegally tackled by St Kilda's Raphael Clarke on the half-forward flank; but, the free kick which was paid was effectively nullified by a dubious advantage call by umpire Ray Chamberlain, as the ball had spilled forward to what turned out to be a neutral ground contest from which St Kilda cleared the ball.

With 1:05 remaining, Ball kicked long to St Kilda's full forward, and Gardiner took flew in from the side to take a strong pack mark; Gardiner's elbow struck Taylor's head in the contest and knocked him unconscious, and there was a three-minute delay while he was stretchered from the ground. Gardiner converted the goal from 10m to give St Kilda the lead. St Kilda flooded its defence for the final minute, and held on for a six-point victory, St Kilda 14.7 (91) d. Geelong 13.7 (85).

=== Overall ===
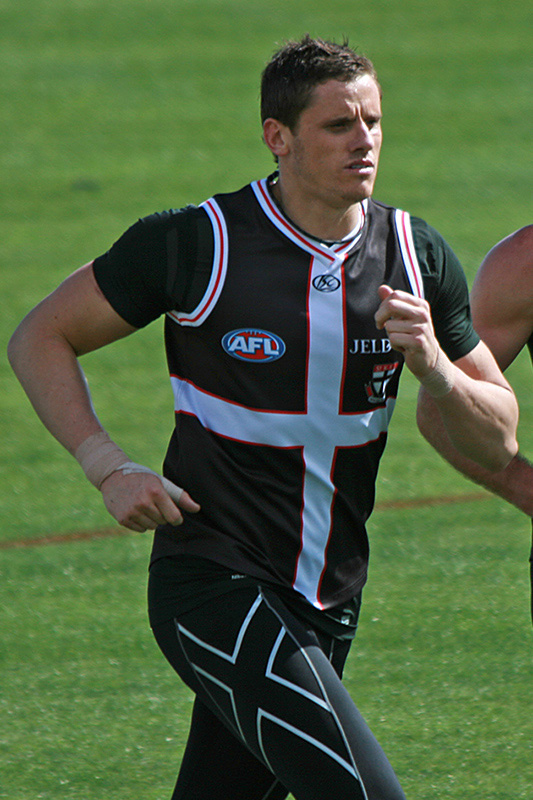
Michael Gardiner's individual performance was the game's most memorable.

There was no consensus for the best player on the ground, but it was St Kilda ruckman Michael Gardiner who received three Brownlow votes and whose performance was best remembered. In a game in which both teams were missing their first choice ruckmen – Steven King suspended for St Kilda and Brad Ottens injured for Geelong – Gardiner stepped up as the most effective ruckman on the ground: his 20 hit-outs were serviceable, albeit fewer than his two opponents Mark Blake (25) and Shane Mumford (22), but his mobility gave him an advantage around the ground and his opponents were unable to counter his influence. He took seven marks and drifted forward to kick four goals, including the game winner in the final minute, while neither Geelong ruckman took a mark. Gardiner's mark for the final goal drew comparisons with Leo Barry's famous last-minute pack mark in the 2005 AFL Grand Final. Gardiner had been a No. 1 draft pick and 2003 All-Australian at West Coast as a star mobile ruckman, but through a combination of injury and poor off-field behaviour he had been traded to St Kilda in 2007 and played only 25 games between 2004 and 2008; having regained a regular place in St Kilda's team in 2009 and been among the best of the biggest games of the year, it was seen as a game of redemption and became the defining moment of Gardiner's career. The game fell on Gardiner's 30th birthday.

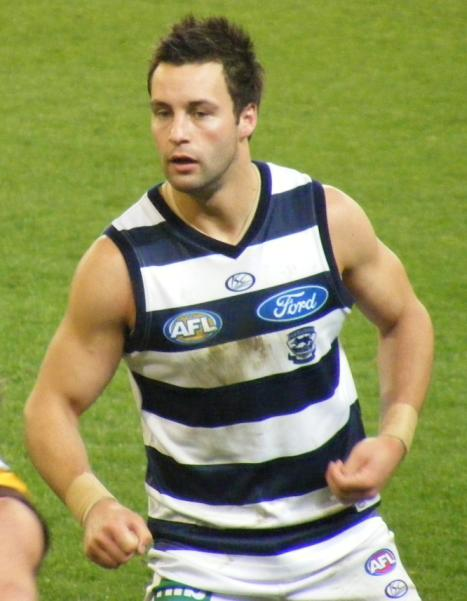
Jimmy Bartel was Geelong's best player.

The remaining Brownlow Medal votes went to Geelong midfielder Jimmy Bartel (37 disposals, 6 clearances) and St Kilda key forward Nick Riewoldt (11 marks, 3 goals), while the best on ground for sportswriters in both the Age and Herald Sun newspapers was St Kilda midfielder Lenny Hayes (33 disposals – including 13 in the final quarter – and 12 clearances). St Kilda half-backs Sam Fisher (20 disposals, 6 rebounds) and Sam Gilbert (27 disposals, 5 rebounds), who were significant in launching St Kilda's attacks, were both among the best; Fisher in particular was influential in St Kilda's fast start, with eight disposals in the first twelve minutes and a first quarter goal; and Geelong's Max Rooke, who took up a defensive forward role and limited Fisher's influence thereafter, was among Geelong's best and critical to its recovery.

Other players among the best for Geelong were Joel Selwood (30 disposals, 6 clearances), Gary Ablett, Jr. (27 disposals, 2 goals), Paul Chapman (39 disposals, 1 goal) and Andrew Mackie (23 disposals, 1 goal); and for St Kilda were Clinton Jones (22 disposals, limited Ablett to four disposals in the final quarter) and Brendon Goddard (24 disposals, 5 rebounds).

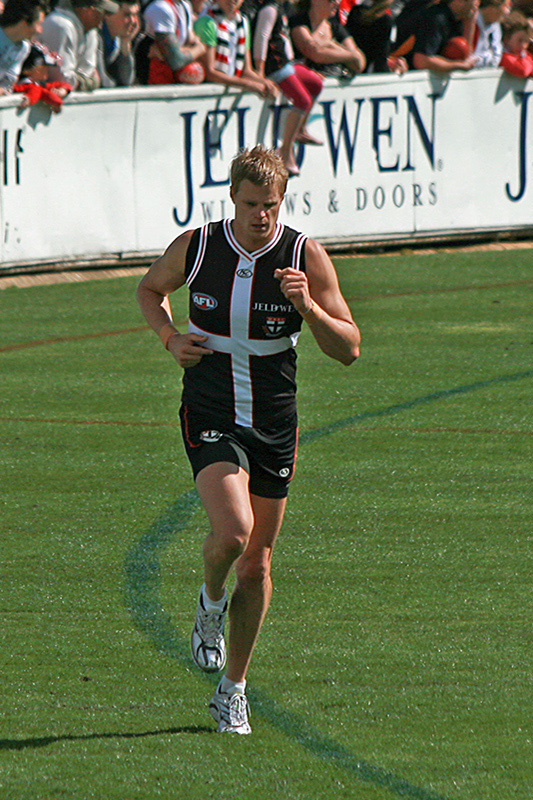
St Kilda's Nick Riewoldt was the dominant forward on the ground.

The output of Geelong's forwards was criticised, with key forwards Tom Hawkins and Cam Mooney combining for only eight marks and two goals, compared with Justin Koschitzke and Nick Riewoldt who combined for 22 marks and five goals for St Kilda. Geelong was not helped by goalsneak Steve Johnson's late withdrawal, his absence reducing Geelong's forward line potency.

St Kilda's opening five-goal assault specifically targeted and stopped Geelong's run-and-handball game with extreme pressure at the ball-carrier, causing several turnovers. Reflecting in 2019, Geelong's Cameron Ling said "that first quarter, I had never experienced speed of the game like that. You had basically zero time to get rid of the ball." However, Geelong ultimately managed to get its typical high-possession gameplan going, and finished with 40 more handpasses than kicks (187–227). Geelong had the better of the contests with a 42–37 advantage in clearances, and a 6–3 advantage in goals from stoppages. St Kilda's defensive and rebound game gave it a 10–5 advantage in goals from rebounds; and its full team defense saw it lay 84 tackles – the second-most in the club's history at that time – to Geelong's 68. Inside-50s were about equal across the game, St Kilda leading 53–51.

=== Scoreboard ===
Round 14, 2009
Sunday, 5 July (3:10 pm)	St Kilda	def.	Geelong	Etihad Stadium (crowd: 54,444)
5.3 (33); 8.4 (52); 10.5 (65); 14.7 (91)	Q1; Q2; Q3; Final	2.2 (14); 5.5 (35); 8.7 (55); 13.7 (85)	Umpires: Vozzo, Chamberlain, Rosebury; Television broadcast: Seven Network
Gardiner 4, Riewoldt 3, Koschitzke 2, McQualter, Schneider, Jones, Fisher, Milne	Goals	Mooney 2, Milburn 2, Ablett 2, Mackie, Corey, Selwood, Rooke, Stokes, Chapman, Varcoe
Hayes, Gardiner, Riewoldt, Gilbert, Goddard, Jones, Fisher	Best	Bartel, Selwood, Mackie, Ablett, Chapman, Rooke
Injuries	Milburn (ankle),Taylor (concussion), Johnson (hip, replaced by Hogan)

Brownlow Medal votes
3 M. Gardiner (St Kilda); 2 J. Bartel (Geelong); 1 N. Riewoldt (St Kilda)

== Aftermath and legacy ==
St Kilda consolidated its position at the top of the ladder with the win, and went on to extend its winning streak to a club record 19 games, before finishing the home-and-away season with a 20–2 record and the minor premiership. Geelong entered something which, by its standards at the time, was a form slump: in its last nine games of the home-and-away season (including the St Kilda game) it went 5–4, with only two of those victories coming by a margin above one goal, and the club finished second with 18–4.

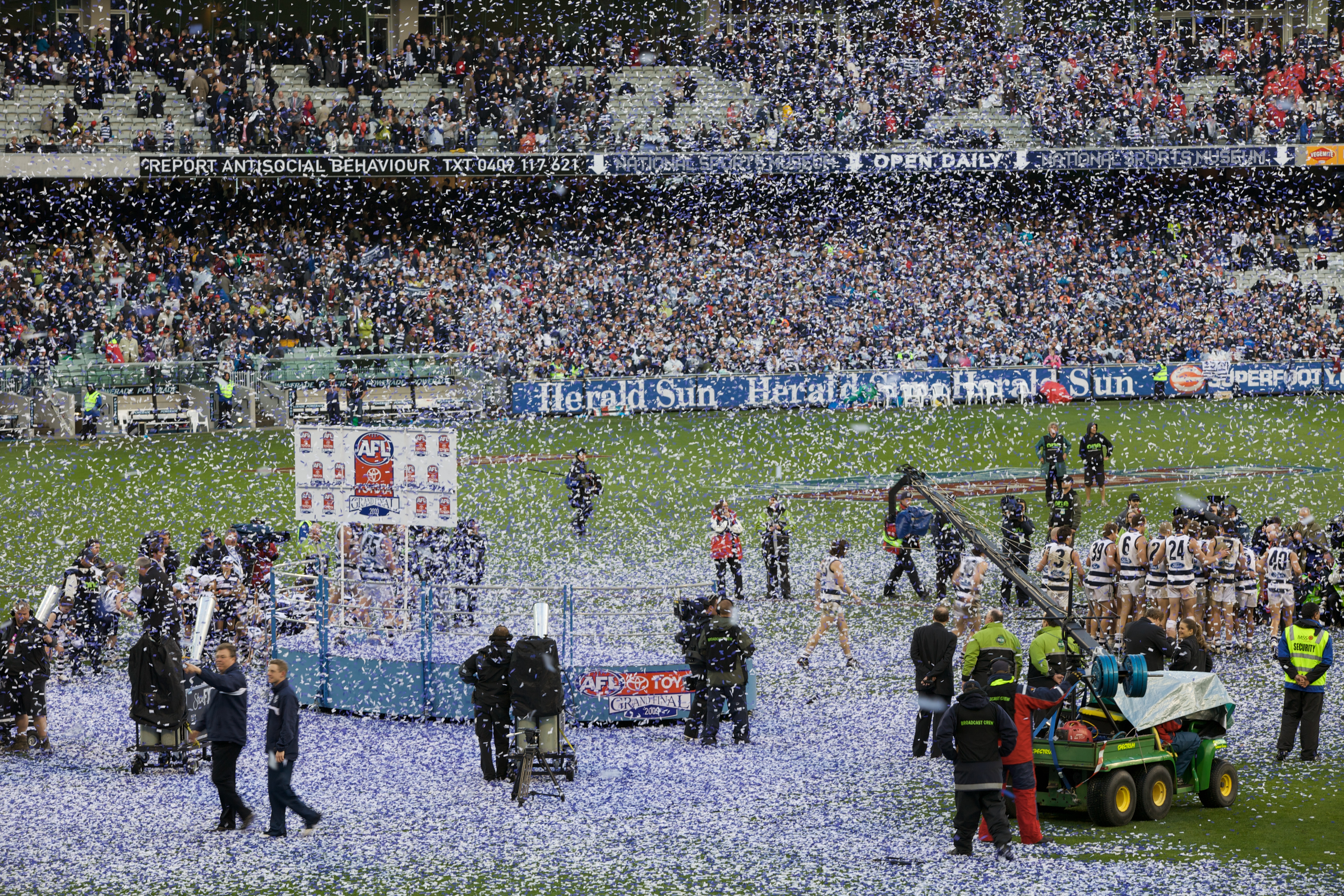
Twelve weeks later, Geelong celebrates its grand final victory against St Kilda.

The two clubs then both won through to the 2009 AFL Grand Final, setting up a rematch. In a close and high-tackling wet-weather encounter, considered just as classic as the round 14 match, the clubs were tied with as little as four minutes remaining – before an individual piece of brilliance between Geelong defender Matthew Scarlett and midfielder Gary Ablett, Jr. known as the Toepoke set up Paul Chapman's go-ahead goal. Geelong 12.8 (80) defeated St Kilda 9.14 (68) by twelve points, winning its eighth premiership.

Sometimes now known as the Battle of the Unbeaten, the round 14 game retains a legacy as one of the AFL's greatest home-and-away matches. Commentator Brian Taylor, reflecting in 2019, said "football reached its peak as a spectacle" in the match. Michael Gardiner's individual performance and game-winning mark and goal remained the most famous moment of his fifteen-year AFL career. As of 2023, the attendance of 54,444 remains the highest for a match at Etihad Stadium, and several players who played there frequently remarked that it was the loudest atmosphere they had encountered at the ground.

== Teams ==
St Kilda	Geelong

St Kilda
B:	27 Jason Blake	19 Sam Gilbert	43 Zac Dawson
HB:	10 Steven Baker	25 Sam Fisher	18 Brendon Goddard
C:	22 Farren Ray	14 Luke Ball	26 Nick Dal Santo
HF:	1 Jason Gram	12 Nick Riewoldt (c)	13 Adam Schneider
F:	7 Lenny Hayes	23 Justin Koschitzke	44 Stephen Milne
Foll:	15 Michael Gardiner	38 Clinton Jones	11 Leigh Montagna
Int:	5 Ben McEvoy	16 Raphael Clarke	32 Andrew McQualter
Int:	42 Jarryn Geary		
Coach:	Ross Lyon		

Geelong
B:	2 Tom Harley (c)	30 Matthew Scarlett	9 James Kelly
HB:	44 Corey Enright	7 Harry Taylor	4 Andrew Mackie
C:	11 Joel Corey	3 Jimmy Bartel	5 Travis Varcoe
HF:	29 Gary Ablett, Jr.	21 Cameron Mooney	27 Mathew Stokes
F:	35 Paul Chapman	26 Tom Hawkins	33 Max Rooke
Foll:	41 Shane Mumford	45 Cameron Ling	14 Joel Selwood
Int:	17 Shannon Byrnes	24 Mark Blake	34 Simon Hogan
Int:	39 Darren Milburn		
Coach:	Mark Thompson		

== See also ==
- 2009 AFL season
- 2009 AFL Grand Final
- 2009 Geelong Football Club season
- 2009 St Kilda Football Club season

== Footnotes ==
1. The 2020 AFL season, which did see several averages lower than 64 points-per-game, is excluded owing to its matches being played at 80% length due to the COVID-19 pandemic.
