= 2009 AFL season =

113th season of the Australian Football League (AFL)

2009 AFL premiership season
- Teams: 16
- Premiers: Geelong; 8th premiership
- Minor premiers: St Kilda; 3rd minor premiership
- Pre-season cup: Geelong; 2nd pre-season cup win
- Brownlow Medallist: Gary Ablett, Jr. Geelong (30 votes)
- Coleman Medallist: Brendan Fevola; Carlton (86 goals)

Attendance
- Matches played: 185
- Total attendance: 6,988,638 (37,776 per match)
- Highest: 99,251 (Grand Final, St Kilda vs. Geelong)

The 2009 AFL season was the 113th season of the Australian Football League (AFL), the highest level senior Australian rules football competition in Australia, which was known as the Victorian Football League until 1989. The season featured sixteen clubs, ran from 26 March until 26 September, and comprised a 22-game home-and-away season followed by a finals series featuring the top eight clubs.

The premiership was won by the Geelong Football Club for the eighth time, after it defeated St Kilda by twelve points in the 2009 AFL Grand Final.

== Pre-season ==
=== AFL pre-season draft ===
The pre-season draft was held on 16 December 2008 (but is referred to as the 2009 Pre-season draft in continuation from the early years of the AFL draft when it was held in January or February) and most pre-draft interest was on whether or not former West Coast Eagles captain and Brownlow Medal winner Ben Cousins would be selected by the Richmond Football Club. Richmond, the only club to show interest in recruiting Cousins, had one selection in the pre-season draft (because it had only one space left on its senior list). In the week leading up to the pre-season draft, Richmond requested to have Graham Polak (who had been hit by a tram the previous season, with it not clear at this stage whether or not the resulting injuries would end his career) moved to the rookie list, to free up an additional list space and give them a second selection in the pre-season draft. The request was similar to one made by and granted to the Essendon Football Club a few years earlier with respect to Adam Ramanauskas, but there were key differences which led to Richmond's request being rejected by the AFL and a majority of rival clubs on 15 December. Although Richmond had maintained throughout the previous week that it would draft Cousins only if its request to put Polak on the rookie list was granted, they selected Cousins anyway with their only selection in the pre-season draft. Josh Carr's return to Port Adelaide was another major player move.

=== NAB Cup ===
Round One
Western Bulldogs	69
Essendon	70
Brisbane Lions	65
St Kilda	56
West Coast	54
Collingwood	116
Fremantle	86
Richmond	89
Geelong	119
Adelaide	84
Sydney	78
Port Adelaide	143
Carlton	123
North Melbourne	70
Hawthorn	69
Melbourne	66

Quarterfinals
Essendon	67
Brisbane Lions	65
Collingwood	97
Richmond	51
Geelong	72
Port Adelaide	54
Carlton	112
Hawthorn	88

Semifinals
Essendon	73
Collingwood	116
Geelong	84
Carlton	67

Final
Collingwood	51
Geelong	127

== Premiership season ==
=== Round 1 ===
	Round 1 (season launch)
Thursday, 26 March	Richmond 9.13 (67)	def. by	Carlton 23.12 (150)	MCG (crowd: 87,043)	Report
Friday, 27 March	Hawthorn 16.7 (103)	def. by	Geelong 15.21 (111)	MCG (crowd: 69,593)	Report
Saturday, 28 March	Collingwood 13.8 (86)	def. by	Adelaide 13.12 (90)	MCG (crowd: 41,591)	Report
Saturday, 28 March	Brisbane Lions 14.11 (95)	def.	West Coast 13.8 (86)	The Gabba (crowd: 26,800)	Report
Saturday, 28 March	St Kilda 12.8 (80)	def.	Sydney 9.11 (65)	Etihad Stadium (crowd: 32,442)	Report
Sunday, 29 March	Melbourne 10.7 (67)	def. by	North Melbourne 15.11 (101)	MCG (crowd: 28,707)	Report
Sunday, 29 March	Port Adelaide 15.17 (107)	def.	Essendon 9.12 (66)	AAMI Stadium (crowd: 28,315)	Report
Sunday, 29 March	Fremantle 13.16 (94)	def. by	Western Bulldogs 25.7 (157)	Subiaco Oval (crowd: 34,634)	Report

=== Round 2 ===
	Round 2
Friday, 3 April	Adelaide 10.9 (69)	def. by	St Kilda 15.11 (101)	AAMI Stadium (crowd: 41,189)	Report
Saturday, 4 April	Geelong 15.15 (105)	def.	Richmond 13.7 (85)	Skilled Stadium (crowd: 22,288)	Report
Saturday, 4 April	Collingwood 17.15 (117)	def.	Melbourne 10.4 (64)	MCG (crowd: 43,176)	Report
Saturday, 4 April	Carlton 18.11 (119)	def.	Brisbane Lions 15.10 (100)	Etihad Stadium (crowd: 42,496)	Report
Saturday, 4 April	Sydney 22.11 (143)	def.	Hawthorn 15.15 (105)	ANZ Stadium (crowd: 36,116)	Report
Sunday, 5 April	Essendon 16.13 (109)	def.	Fremantle 10.11 (71)	Etihad Stadium (crowd: 27,461)	Report
Sunday, 5 April	Western Bulldogs 11.14 (80)	def.	North Melbourne 9.11 (65)	MCG (crowd: 34,466)	Report
Sunday, 5 April	West Coast 19.11 (125)	def.	Port Adelaide 10.15 (75)	Subiaco Oval (crowd: 37,826)	Report

=== Round 3 ===
	Round 3 (Easter)
Thursday, 9 April	Geelong 18.14 (122)	def.	Collingwood 13.17 (95)	MCG (crowd: 58,527)	Report
Saturday, 11 April	St Kilda 25.11 (161)	def.	West Coast 9.10 (64)	Etihad Stadium (crowd: 29,006)	Report
Saturday, 11 April	Brisbane Lions 15.10 (100)	def.	Sydney 9.13 (67)	The Gabba (crowd: 24,984)	Report
Saturday, 11 April	Carlton 16.16 (112)	def. by	Essendon 17.14 (116)	MCG (crowd: 70,411)	Report
Sunday, 12 April	Port Adelaide 22.15 (147)	def.	Melbourne 14.6 (90)	AAMI Stadium (crowd: 21,030)	Report
Sunday, 12 April	North Melbourne 10.9 (69)	def. by	Hawthorn 19.9 (123)	Etihad Stadium (crowd: 34,893)	Report
Sunday, 12 April	Fremantle 11.14 (80)	def. by	Adelaide 15.14 (104)	Subiaco Oval (crowd: 30,035)	Report
Monday, 13 April	Western Bulldogs 16.14 (110)	def.	Richmond 8.15 (63)	Etihad Stadium (crowd: 46,261)	Report

=== Round 4 ===
	Round 4
Friday, 17 April	Brisbane Lions 10.13 (73)	def. by	Collingwood 13.12 (90)	The Gabba (crowd: 34,912)	Report
Saturday, 18 April	Sydney 12.12 (84)	def.	Carlton 9.13 (67)	SCG (crowd: 30,834)	Report
Saturday, 18 April	Hawthorn 12.13 (85)	def. by	Port Adelaide 17.13 (115)	MCG (crowd: 33,274)	Report
Saturday, 18 April	St Kilda 17.9 (111)	def.	Fremantle 4.4 (28)	Etihad Stadium (crowd: 26,326)	Report
Saturday, 18 April	Adelaide 13.8 (86)	def. by	Geelong 21.8 (134)	AAMI Stadium (crowd: 40,418)	Report
Sunday, 19 April	North Melbourne 10.9 (69)	def.	Essendon 7.15 (57)	Etihad Stadium (crowd: 33,842)	Report
Sunday, 19 April	Richmond 13.14 (92)	def. by	Melbourne 14.16 (100)	MCG (crowd: 40,763)	Report
Sunday, 19 April	West Coast 17.14 (116)	def.	Western Bulldogs 12.11 (83)	Subiaco Oval (crowd: 37,758)	Report
St Kilda recorded its greatest win in matches against Fremantle, 83 points.; Gary Ablett, Jr. (Geelong) recorded 33 handpasses in the match against Adelaide. It broke West Coast's Matt Priddis' 2008 record for most handpasses in a game (30), and stood as the record until 2018. In the same match, Geelong set a new team record of 254 handpasses, exceeding its own 2008 record of 242 handpasses.; Daniel Pratt (North Melbourne) became the first player to concede a free kick for deliberately rushing a behind, under the new rule introduced this year; Matthew Lloyd (Essendon) goaled from the free kick.

=== Round 5 ===
	Round 5 (ANZAC Day)
Friday, 24 April	Port Adelaide 5.6 (36)	def. by	St Kilda 15.12 (102)	AAMI Stadium (crowd: 25,426)	Report
Saturday, 25 April	Essendon 13.15 (93)	def.	Collingwood 12.16 (88)	MCG (crowd: 84,829)	Report
Saturday, 25 April	Hawthorn 11.8 (74)	def.	West Coast 7.14 (56)	Aurora Stadium (crowd: 17,880)	Report
Saturday, 25 April	Fremantle 18.13 (121)	def.	Sydney 16.4 (100)	Subiaco Oval (crowd: 32,884)	Report
Saturday, 25 April	North Melbourne 7.16 (58)	def. by	Richmond 13.16 (94)	Etihad Stadium (crowd: 29,224)	Report
Sunday, 26 April	Geelong 18.18 (126)	def.	Brisbane Lions 5.3 (33)	Skilled Stadium (crowd: 15,580)	Report
Sunday, 26 April	Western Bulldogs 13.12 (90)	def. by	Carlton 21.7 (133)	Etihad Stadium (crowd: 44,268)	Report
Sunday, 26 April	Melbourne 4.10 (34)	def. by	Adelaide 7.9 (51)	MCG (crowd: 14,129)	Report
Geelong amassed a new record 490 disposals in its match against Brisbane, breaking the old record of 469 disposals (West Coast, 2007; and Geelong, 2008).

=== Round 6 ===
	Round 6
Friday, 1 May	North Melbourne 11.9 (75)	def. by	Collingwood 19.13 (127)	Etihad Stadium (crowd: 40,087)	Report
Saturday, 2 May	Hawthorn 16.10 (106)	def.	Carlton 15.12 (102)	MCG (crowd: 69,014)	Report
Saturday, 2 May	West Coast 9.20 (74)	def. by	Fremantle 13.9 (87)	Subiaco Oval (crowd: 41,654)	Report
Saturday, 2 May	Brisbane Lions 17.9 (111)	def.	Essendon 9.14 (68)	The Gabba (crowd: 29,252)	Report
Saturday, 2 May	Port Adelaide 15.15 (105)	def.	Adelaide 12.7 (79)	AAMI Stadium (crowd: 41,558)	Report
Sunday, 3 May	Sydney 14.10 (94)	def.	Richmond 11.9 (75)	SCG (crowd: 25,410)	Report
Sunday, 3 May	Melbourne 10.8 (68)	def. by	Geelong 15.21 (111)	MCG (crowd: 36,932)	Report
Sunday, 3 May	Western Bulldogs 11.10 (76)	def. by	St Kilda 14.20 (104)	Etihad Stadium (crowd: 36,302)	Report
Geelong recorded 498 disposals, including 259 handpasses, in its match against Melbourne; these marks broke the records the club had set in Rounds 5 and 4 respectively.

=== Round 7 ===
	Round 7
Friday, 8 May	Essendon 17.14 (116)	def.	Hawthorn 10.12 (72)	Etihad Stadium (crowd: 50,475)	Report
Saturday, 9 May	Geelong 17.14 (116)	def.	Sydney 10.5 (65)	Skilled Stadium (crowd: 22,050)	Report
Saturday, 9 May	Richmond 10.11 (71)	def. by	Brisbane Lions 15.7 (97)	MCG (crowd: 34,646)	Report
Saturday, 9 May	North Melbourne 20.5 (125)	def.	Port Adelaide 18.12 (120)	Etihad Stadium (crowd: 14,342)	Report
Saturday, 9 May	Carlton 11.15 (81)	def. by	Fremantle 13.10 (88)	Gold Coast Stadium (crowd: 10,294)	Report
Sunday, 10 May	Adelaide 12.14 (86)	def. by	Western Bulldogs 17.16 (118)	AAMI Stadium (crowd: 31,742)	Report
Sunday, 10 May	West Coast 12.18 (90)	def.	Melbourne 13.4 (82)	Subiaco Oval (crowd: 35,209)	Report
Monday, 11 May	Collingwood 5.10 (40)	def. by	St Kilda 20.8 (128)	Etihad Stadium (crowd: 46,880)	Report
St Kilda defeated Collingwood won by 88 points, its greatest ever winning margin against Collingwood.

=== Round 8 ===
	Round 8
Friday, 15 May	Fremantle 9.11 (65)	def. by	Hawthorn 13.9 (87)	Subiaco Oval (crowd: 39,135)	Report
Saturday, 16 May	Melbourne 15.7 (97)	def. by	Western Bulldogs 15.14 (104)	MCG (crowd: 28,279)	Report
Saturday, 16 May	Geelong 18.11 (119)	def.	North Melbourne 7.7 (49)	Skilled Stadium (crowd: 20,273)	Report
Saturday, 16 May	Brisbane Lions 18.11 (119)	def.	Adelaide 12.11 (83)	The Gabba (crowd: 27,767)	Report
Saturday, 16 May	Sydney 16.10 (106)	def.	West Coast 15.11 (101)	ANZ Stadium (crowd: 33,079)	Report
Sunday, 17 May	Port Adelaide 14.18 (102)	def.	Richmond 15.9 (99)	AAMI Stadium (crowd: 22,034)	Report
Sunday, 17 May	Collingwood 7.11 (53)	def. by	Carlton 16.8 (104)	MCG (crowd: 82,834)	Report
Sunday, 17 May	St Kilda 13.12 (90)	def.	Essendon 10.11 (71)	Etihad Stadium (crowd: 45,594)	Report

=== Round 9 ===
	Round 9 (Indigenous Round)
Friday, 22 May	Geelong 17.14 (116)	def.	Western Bulldogs 17.12 (114)	Etihad Stadium (crowd: 44,620)	Report
Saturday, 23 May	North Melbourne 14.14 (98)	def.	Fremantle 12.13 (85)	Etihad Stadium (crowd: 15,436)	Report
Saturday, 23 May	Adelaide 15.14 (104)	def.	Carlton 8.12 (60)	AAMI Stadium (crowd: 41,107)	Report
Saturday, 23 May	West Coast 9.12 (66)	def. by	Collingwood 12.16 (88)	Subiaco Oval (crowd: 36,658)	Report
Saturday, 23 May	Richmond 12.13 (85)	def. by	Essendon 19.11 (125)	MCG (crowd: 73,625)	Report
Sunday, 24 May	Sydney 18.15 (123)	def.	Port Adelaide 10.8 (68)	SCG (crowd: 23,229)	Report
Sunday, 24 May	St Kilda 14.13 (97)	def.	Brisbane Lions 13.3 (81)	Etihad Stadium (crowd: 30,673)	Report
Sunday, 24 May	Hawthorn 17.12 (114)	def.	Melbourne 13.14 (92)	MCG (crowd: 39,395)	Report

=== Round 10 ===
	Round 10
Friday, 29 May	Carlton 16.15 (111)	def.	West Coast 10.10 (70)	Etihad Stadium (crowd: 39,611)	Report
Saturday, 30 May	Western Bulldogs 18.9 (117)	def.	Sydney 12.5 (77)	Manuka Oval (crowd: 12,457)	Report
Saturday, 30 May	North Melbourne 12.9 (81)	def. by	Brisbane Lions 15.9 (99)	Etihad Stadium (crowd: 21,583)	Report
Saturday, 30 May	Fremantle 17.10 (112)	def. by	Richmond 17.13 (115)	Subiaco Oval (crowd: 35,391)	Report
Saturday, 30 May	St Kilda 11.17 (83)	def.	Melbourne 6.10 (46)	Gold Coast Stadium (crowd: 9,112)	Report
Sunday, 31 May	Adelaide 16.10 (106)	def.	Hawthorn 12.7 (79)	AAMI Stadium (crowd: 40,035)	Report
Sunday, 31 May	Essendon 11.4 (70)	def. by	Geelong 20.14 (134)	Etihad Stadium (crowd: 48,852)	Report
Sunday, 31 May	Collingwood 17.12 (114)	def.	Port Adelaide 11.10 (76)	MCG (crowd: 34,793)	Report

=== Round 11 ===
	Round 11 (Women’s Round, Queen's Birthday Holiday Weekend)
Friday, 5 June	Richmond 14.5 (89)	def. by	Western Bulldogs 24.13 (157)	Etihad Stadium (crowd: 36,483)	Report
Saturday, 6 June	North Melbourne 9.3 (57)	def. by	St Kilda 15.13 (103)	Etihad Stadium (crowd: 30,962)	Report
Saturday, 6 June	Brisbane Lions 16.10 (106)	def. by	Carlton 16.16 (112)	The Gabba (crowd: 33,790)	Report
Saturday, 6 June	Port Adelaide 14.10 (94)	def.	Fremantle 11.4 (70)	AAMI Stadium (crowd: 18,418)	Report
Sunday, 7 June	Essendon 18.6 (114)	def. by	Adelaide 21.4 (130)	Etihad Stadium (crowd: 39,451)	Report
Sunday, 7 June	Hawthorn 12.14 (86)	def.	Sydney 11.9 (75)	MCG (crowd: 44,464)	Report
Sunday, 7 June	West Coast 11.11 (77)	def. by	Geelong 15.9 (99)	Subiaco Oval (crowd: 35,355)	Report
Monday, 8 June	Melbourne 8.12 (60)	def. by	Collingwood 19.12 (126)	MCG (crowd: 61,287)	Report
Terry Wallace coached his final match for Richmond, after announcing his retirement earlier in the week. Wallace was replaced by Jade Rawlings as caretaker.; St Kilda won its 11th consecutive game, breaking the previous club record of 10 set in 2004.

=== Round 12 ===
	Round 12 (Split round)
Friday, 12 June	Carlton 14.11 (95)	def. by	St Kilda 16.8 (104)	Etihad Stadium (crowd: 50,820)	Report
Saturday, 13 June	Western Bulldogs 21.11 (137)	def.	Port Adelaide 7.2 (44)	TIO Stadium (crowd: 11,306)	Report
Saturday, 13 June	Richmond 13.14 (92)	def.	West Coast 11.11 (77)	Etihad Stadium (crowd: 30,117)	Report
Sunday, 14 June	Hawthorn 7.9 (51)	def. by	Brisbane Lions 13.15 (93)	Aurora Stadium (crowd: 16,710)	Report
Sunday, 14 June	Adelaide 9.14 (68)	def.	North Melbourne 3.6 (24)	AAMI Stadium (crowd: 30,173)	Report
Friday, 19 June	Essendon 19.17 (131)	def.	Melbourne 13.5 (83)	Etihad Stadium (crowd: 45,740)	Report
Saturday, 20 June	Sydney 9.12 (66)	def. by	Collingwood 13.11 (89)	ANZ Stadium (crowd: 41,042)	Report
Sunday, 21 June	Fremantle 11.9 (75)	def. by	Geelong 13.16 (94)	Subiaco Oval (crowd: 33,213)	Report
In wet weather in Adelaide, North Melbourne was held to 3.6 (24), its lowest score since 1971, and the lowest score by any team since round 4, 1999.

=== Round 13 ===
	Round 13
Friday, 26 June	Essendon 21.10 (136)	def.	Carlton 9.13 (67)	MCG (crowd: 83,407)	Report
Saturday, 27 June	Collingwood 26.13 (169)	def.	Fremantle 13.7 (85)	MCG (crowd: 44,114)	Report
Saturday, 27 June	Adelaide 12.13 (85)	def.	Sydney 10.9 (69)	AAMI Stadium (crowd: 38,064)	Report
Saturday, 27 June	West Coast 16.11 (107)	def.	Hawthorn 13.9 (87)	Subiaco Oval (crowd: 31,441)	Report
Saturday, 27 June	Brisbane Lions 16.15 (111)	def.	Melbourne 8.8 (56)	The Gabba (crowd: 23,750)	Report
Sunday, 28 June	Geelong 18.14 (122)	def.	Port Adelaide 13.10 (88)	Skilled Stadium (crowd: 21,142)	Report
Sunday, 28 June	North Melbourne 12.14 (86)	def. by	Western Bulldogs 17.6 (108)	MCG (crowd: 31,470)	Report
Sunday, 28 June	St Kilda 13.14 (92)	def.	Richmond 5.6 (36)	Etihad Stadium (crowd: 38,196)	Report

=== Round 14 ===
	Round 14
Friday, 3 July	Collingwood 15.12 (102)	def.	Essendon 9.13 (67)	MCG (crowd: 77,699)	Report
Saturday, 4 July	Melbourne 17.10 (112)	def.	West Coast 13.14 (92)	MCG (crowd: 23,149)	Report
Saturday, 4 July	Port Adelaide 19.14 (128)	def.	Brisbane Lions 11.14 (80)	AAMI Stadium (crowd: 20,293)	Report
Saturday, 4 July	Richmond 13.7 (85)	def. by	Adelaide 15.12 (102)	Gold Coast Stadium (crowd: 11,174)	Report
Saturday, 4 July	Western Bulldogs 19.19 (133)	def.	Hawthorn 6.9 (45)	Etihad Stadium (crowd: 36,827)	Report
Sunday, 5 July	Sydney 15.10 (100)	def.	North Melbourne 13.7 (85)	SCG (crowd: 21,929)	Report
Sunday, 5 July	St Kilda 14.7 (91)	def.	Geelong 13.7 (85)	Etihad Stadium (crowd: 54,444)	Report
Sunday, 5 July	Fremantle 15.10 (100)	def. by	Carlton 16.19 (115)	Subiaco Oval (crowd: 34,720)	Report
The match between St Kilda and Geelong saw both teams enter the game undefeated with 13–0 records; unbeaten teams had never faced each other so late in the season, the previous latest being Round 8, 1991 between West Coast and Essendon. The high demand for the match to be broadcast live resulted in a change in timeslot, moving from 2:10 pm to 3:10 pm so that the Seven Network could broadcast the game live into Melbourne, and use it as a lead-in to its 6pm news broadcast in accordance with its broadcast contract. As of 2021, the match's attendance of 54,444 stands as the largest crowd at an AFL game held at Etihad Stadium. Geelong's loss was its first at the stadium since Round 1, 2007, ending a 13-match winning streak at the ground. The game also ended Geelong's run of 52 wins from 55 matches.; Western Bulldogs held reigning Coleman Medallist Lance Franklin goalless for the first time since Round 11, 2006, breaking a streak of 71 consecutive games scoring at least one goal. As of 2022, the streak stands as the longest by a player in the 21st century.

=== Round 15 ===
	Round 15
Friday, 10 July	Western Bulldogs 16.14 (110)	def. by	Collingwood 17.9 (111)	Etihad Stadium (crowd: 51,382)	Report
Saturday, 11 July	Sydney 10.12 (72)	def. by	Essendon 15.17 (107)	SCG (crowd: 30,924)	Report
Saturday, 11 July	Carlton 16.13 (109)	def.	Richmond 12.17 (89)	MCG (crowd: 50,784)	Report
Saturday, 11 July	Brisbane Lions 16.12 (108)	def.	Geelong 9.11 (65)	The Gabba (crowd: 34,274)	Report
Saturday, 11 July	Adelaide 19.16 (130)	def.	Fremantle 1.7 (13)	AAMI Stadium (crowd: 32,451)	Report
Sunday, 12 July	Hawthorn 10.13 (73)	def.	North Melbourne 9.10 (64)	Aurora Stadium (crowd: 15,080)	Report
Sunday, 12 July	Melbourne 15.11 (101)	def.	Port Adelaide 13.12 (90)	MCG (crowd: 15,888)	Report
Sunday, 12 July	West Coast 11.4 (70)	def. by	St Kilda 13.12 (90)	Subiaco Oval (crowd: 36,259)	Report
Adelaide's dominant victory against Fremantle saw the latter held to a score of only 1.7 (13). As of 2025, it stands as the lowest score in Fremantle's history; and, it was the lowest score kicked by any team in a game since 1961. Fremantle managed only one behind in the first half, also the lowest in club history and the lowest by any club since Fitzroy in Round 1, 1995.

=== Round 16 ===
	Round 16
Friday, 17 July	Essendon 11.4 (70)	def. by	Western Bulldogs 15.13 (103)	Etihad Stadium (crowd: 47,120)	Report
Saturday, 18 July	Carlton 19.10 (124)	def.	Sydney 9.9 (63)	Etihad Stadium (crowd: 42,018)	Report
Saturday, 18 July	Geelong 17.15 (117)	def.	Melbourne 11.5 (71)	Skilled Stadium (crowd: 21,160)	Report
Saturday, 18 July	Fremantle 7.5 (47)	def. by	Brisbane Lions 9.8 (62)	Subiaco Oval (crowd: 22,595)	Report
Saturday, 18 July	Collingwood 11.10 (76)	def. by	Hawthorn 18.13 (121)	MCG (crowd: 66,149)	Report
Sunday, 19 July	Port Adelaide 17.10 (112)	def.	West Coast 11.10 (76)	AAMI Stadium (crowd: 21,106)	Report
Sunday, 19 July	Richmond 12.13 (85)	drew with	North Melbourne 12.13 (85)	MCG (crowd: 30,604)	Report
Sunday, 19 July	St Kilda 15.15 (105)	def.	Adelaide 7.6 (48)	Etihad Stadium (crowd: 31,940)	Report
Carlton defeated Sydney to end a twelve-game losing streak against the club, dating back to 2000.

=== Round 17 ===
	Round 17 (Rivalry Round)
Friday, 24 July	Carlton 4.16 (40)	def. by	Collingwood 14.10 (94)	MCG (crowd: 84,938)	Report
Saturday, 25 July	Geelong 15.9 (99)	def.	Hawthorn 14.14 (98)	MCG (crowd: 64,803)	Report
Saturday, 25 July	Fremantle 10.11 (71)	def.	West Coast 8.18 (66)	Subiaco Oval (crowd: 39,536)	Report
Saturday, 25 July	Brisbane Lions 17.14 (116)	def.	North Melbourne 11.9 (75)	The Gabba (crowd: 25,509)	Report
Saturday, 25 July	St Kilda 16.10 (106)	def.	Western Bulldogs 9.7 (61)	Etihad Stadium (crowd: 45,082)	Report
Sunday, 26 July	Melbourne 6.14 (50)	def. by	Sydney 10.8 (68)	Manuka Oval (crowd: 7,311)	Report
Sunday, 26 July	Essendon 14.12 (96)	def. by	Richmond 15.11 (101)	MCG (crowd: 47,412)	Report
Sunday, 26 July	Adelaide 19.18 (132)	def.	Port Adelaide 9.8 (62)	AAMI Stadium (crowd: 46,859)	Report
After Geelong trailed by 28 points early in the final quarter, it came from behind to defeat Hawthorn by one point, with the winning behind kicked after the siren by Jimmy Bartel.

=== Round 18 ===
	Round 18
Friday, 31 July	North Melbourne 11.18 (84)	def. by	Carlton 14.10 (94)	Etihad Stadium (crowd: 38,554)	Report
Saturday, 1 August	Western Bulldogs 17.9 (111)	def.	Fremantle 11.14 (80)	Etihad Stadium (crowd: 19,065)	Report
Saturday, 1 August	Geelong 14.9 (93)	def.	Adelaide 13.13 (91)	Skilled Stadium (crowd: 21,686)	Report
Saturday, 1 August	Sydney 13.15 (93)	def. by	St Kilda 13.16 (94)	SCG (crowd: 27,805)	Report
Saturday, 1 August	Collingwood 12.23 (95)	def.	Brisbane Lions 8.7 (55)	MCG (crowd: 47,268)	Report
Sunday, 2 August	Melbourne 12.10 (82)	def. by	Richmond 12.14 (86)	MCG (crowd: 37,438)	Report
Sunday, 2 August	Port Adelaide 18.13 (121)	def.	Hawthorn 14.19 (103)	AAMI Stadium (crowd: 25,154)	Report
Sunday, 2 August	West Coast 14.11 (95)	def.	Essendon 10.8 (68)	Subiaco Oval (crowd: 35,765)	Report
Brad Johnson played his 342nd game for the Western Bulldogs, surpassing Chris Grant to become the club's games record holder.; Richmond's Jordan McMahon kicked a goal after the final siren from outside the 50-metre arc to secure a four-point win over Melbourne, after Richmond came back from a few goals behind late in the final quarter. Melbourne was later accused of attempting to deliberately lose the match to stay near the bottom of the ladder and secure better draft picks, and the game later became part of an AFL tanking investigation into Melbourne, conducted in 2012 and 2013.

=== Round 19 ===
	Round 19
Friday, 7 August	Carlton 14.13 (97)	def.	Geelong 8.14 (62)	MCG (crowd: 55,057)	Report
Saturday, 8 August	Western Bulldogs 13.19 (97)	def. by	West Coast 16.6 (102)	Etihad Stadium (crowd: 22,417)	Report
Saturday, 8 August	Hawthorn 7.7 (49)	def. by	St Kilda 10.14 (74)	Aurora Stadium (crowd: 20,011)	Report
Saturday, 8 August	Essendon 13.9 (87)	drew with	Brisbane Lions 12.15 (87)	MCG (crowd: 41,636)	Report
Saturday, 8 August	Adelaide 9.14 (68)	def. by	Collingwood 13.11 (89)	AAMI Stadium (crowd: 45,128)	Report
Sunday, 9 August	North Melbourne 19.9 (123)	def.	Melbourne 8.13 (61)	Etihad Stadium (crowd: 16,594)	Report
Sunday, 9 August	Richmond 10.8 (68)	def. by	Sydney 18.15 (123)	MCG (crowd: 32,216)	Report
Sunday, 9 August	Fremantle 17.14 (116)	def.	Port Adelaide 11.8 (74)	Subiaco Oval (crowd: 30,029)	Report
Brisbane Lions's Daniel Bradshaw kicked a goal after the final siren to draw his side's game against Essendon.

=== Round 20 ===
	Round 20 (Green Round)
Friday, 14 August	Hawthorn 9.13 (67)	def. by	Adelaide 13.16 (94)	MCG (crowd: 32,583)	Report
Saturday, 15 August	Richmond 8.11 (59)	def. by	Collingwood 22.20 (152)	MCG (crowd: 63,366)	Report
Saturday, 15 August	West Coast 17.8 (110)	def.	North Melbourne 10.12 (72)	Subiaco Oval (crowd: 32,472)	Report
Saturday, 15 August	Brisbane Lions 12.12 (84)	def. by	Western Bulldogs 15.12 (102)	The Gabba (crowd: 33,421)	Report
Saturday, 15 August	Sydney 13.9 (87)	def. by	Geelong 13.14 (92)	ANZ Stadium (crowd: 40,261)	Report
Sunday, 16 August	Melbourne 20.7 (127)	def.	Fremantle 9.10 (64)	MCG (crowd: 13,004)	Report
Sunday, 16 August	Port Adelaide 9.13 (67)	def. by	Carlton 18.13 (121)	AAMI Stadium (crowd: 27,221)	Report
Sunday, 16 August	Essendon 16.14 (110)	def.	St Kilda 16.12 (108)	Etihad Stadium (crowd: 41,410)	Report
Essendon defeated St Kilda by two points to inflict St Kilda's first loss of the season; St Kilda's captain Nick Riewoldt had the chance to win the game with a 45-metre set shot after the final siren, but he missed the goal. The losses ended St Kilda's 19-game winning streak, which as of 2022 stands as the longest in St Kilda's history and the equal fifth-longest by any club in VFL/AFL history.

=== Round 21 ===
	Round 21
Friday, 21 August	Western Bulldogs 16.14 (110)	def.	Geelong 14.12 (96)	Etihad Stadium (crowd: 46,818)	Report
Saturday, 22 August	Carlton 24.9 (153)	def.	Melbourne 15.6 (96)	Etihad Stadium (crowd: 37,433)	Report
Saturday, 22 August	Adelaide 18.14 (122)	def.	West Coast 7.6 (48)	AAMI Stadium (crowd: 39,640)	Report
Saturday, 22 August	Brisbane Lions 16.11 (107)	def.	Port Adelaide 14.8 (92)	The Gabba (crowd: 26,437)	Report
Saturday, 22 August	Richmond 14.9 (93)	def. by	Hawthorn 20.15 (135)	MCG (crowd: 34,779)	Report
Sunday, 23 August	St Kilda 8.11 (59)	def. by	North Melbourne 10.4 (64)	Etihad Stadium (crowd: 30,522)	Report
Sunday, 23 August	Collingwood 13.19 (97)	def.	Sydney 8.8 (56)	MCG (crowd: 54,400)	Report
Sunday, 23 August	Fremantle 21.15 (141)	def.	Essendon 13.9 (87)	Subiaco Oval (crowd: 32,413)	Report

=== Round 22 ===
	Round 22
Friday, 28 August	West Coast 17.23 (125)	def.	Richmond 6.9 (45)	Subiaco Oval (crowd: 39,017)	Report
Saturday, 29 August	Geelong 14.10 (94)	def.	Fremantle 8.6 (54)	Skilled Stadium (crowd: 18,196)	Report
Saturday, 29 August	Hawthorn 14.15 (99)	def. by	Essendon 16.20 (116)	MCG (crowd: 77,278)	Report
Saturday, 29 August	Carlton 16.8 (104)	def. by	Adelaide 27.14 (176)	Etihad Stadium (crowd: 42,356)	Report
Saturday, 29 August	Sydney 14.8 (92)	def. by	Brisbane Lions 15.10 (100)	SCG (crowd: 27,933)	Report
Saturday, 29 August	Port Adelaide 9.13 (67)	def. by	North Melbourne 10.11 (71)	AAMI Stadium (crowd: 17,284)	Report
Sunday, 30 August	Melbourne 10.7 (67)	def. by	St Kilda 17.12 (114)	MCG (crowd: 36,748)	Report
Sunday, 30 August	Collingwood 10.16 (76)	def. by	Western Bulldogs 14.16 (100)	Etihad Stadium (crowd: 48,888)	Report

=== Season notes ===
- Hawthorn missed the finals, become the first reigning premier to do so since Adelaide in 1999.
- In the final round, Western Bulldogs defeated Collingwood by 24 points; the win gave the Bulldogs a 0.31% percentage advantage over Collingwood, placing the Bulldogs third and the Magpies fourth. Had Brad Johnson not scored a goal in the final minute, Collingwood would have finished third.

== Win/loss table ==
Team	1	2	3	4	5	6	7	8	9	10	11	12	13	14	15	16	17	18	19	20	21	22	F1	F2	F3	GF	Ladder
Adelaide	Coll +4	**StK** **−32**	Frem +24	**Geel** **−48**	Melb +17	PA −26	**WB** **−32**	BL −36	**Carl** **+44**	**Haw** **+27**	Ess +16	**NM** **+44**	**Syd** **+16**	Rich +17	**Frem** **+117**	StK −57	**PA** **+70**	Geel −2	**Coll** **−21**	Haw +27	**WCE** **+74**	Carl +72	**Ess** **+96**	Coll −5	X	X	**5 (5)**
Brisbane Lions	**WCE** **+9**	Carl −19	**Syd** **+33**	**Coll** **−17**	Geel −93	**Ess** **+43**	Rich +26	**Adel** **+36**	StK −16	NM +18	**Carl** **−6**	Haw +42	**Melb** **+55**	PA −48	**Geel** **+43**	Frem +15	**NM** **+41**	Coll −40	Ess; 0	**WB** **−18**	**PA** **+15**	Syd +8	**Carl** **+7**	WB −51	X	X	**6 (6)**
Carlton	Rich +83	**BL** **+19**	**Ess** **−4**	Syd −17	WB +43	Haw −4	**Frem** **−7**	Coll +51	Adel −44	**WCE** **+41**	BL +6	**StK** **−9**	Ess −69	Frem +15	**Rich** **+20**	**Syd** **+61**	**Coll** **−54**	NM +10	**Geel** **+35**	PA +54	**Melb** **+57**	**Adel** **−72**	BL −7	X	X	X	**7 (7)**
Collingwood	**Adel** **−4**	**Melb** **+53**	Geel −27	BL +17	Ess −5	NM +52	**StK** **−88**	**Carl** **−51**	WCE +22	**PA** **+38**	Melb +66	Syd +23	**Frem** **+84**	**Ess** **+35**	WB +1	**Haw** **−45**	Carl +54	**BL** **+40**	Adel +21	Rich +93	**Syd** **+41**	**WB** **−24**	StK −28	**Adel** **+5**	Geel −73	X	**4 (4)**
Essendon	PA −41	**Frem** **+38**	Carl +4	NM −12	**Coll** **+5**	BL −43	**Haw** **+44**	StK −19	Rich +40	**Geel** **−64**	**Adel** **−16**	**Melb** **+48**	**Carl** **+69**	Coll −35	Syd +35	**WB** **−33**	**Rich** **−5**	WCE −27	**BL**; **0**	**StK** **+2**	Frem −54	Haw +17	Adel −96	X	X	X	**8 (8)**
Fremantle	**WB** **−63**	Ess −38	**Adel** **−24**	StK −83	**Syd** **+21**	WCE +13	Carl +7	**Haw** **−22**	NM −13	**Rich** **−3**	PA −24	**Geel** **−19**	Coll −84	**Carl** **−15**	Adel −117	**BL** **−15**	**WCE** **+5**	WB −31	**PA** **+42**	Melb −63	**Ess** **+54**	Geel −40	X	X	X	X	14
Geelong	Haw +8	**Rich** **+20**	**Coll** **+27**	Adel +48	**BL** **+93**	Melb +43	**Syd** **+51**	**NM** **+70**	**WB** **+2**	Ess +64	WCE +22	Frem +19	**PA** **+34**	StK −6	BL −43	**Melb** **+46**	**Haw** **+1**	**Adel** **+2**	Carl −35	Syd +5	WB −14	**Frem** **+40**	**WB** **+14**	X	**Coll** **+73**	StK +12	**2 (1)**
Hawthorn	**Geel** **−8**	Syd −38	NM +54	**PA** **−30**	**WCE** **+18**	**Carl** **+4**	Ess −44	Frem +22	**Melb** **+22**	Adel −27	**Syd** **+11**	**BL** **−42**	WCE −20	WB −88	**NM** **+9**	Coll +45	Geel −1	PA −18	**StK** **−25**	**Adel** **−27**	Rich +42	**Ess** **−17**	X	X	X	X	9
Melbourne	**NM** **−34**	Coll −53	PA −57	Rich +8	**Adel** **−17**	**Geel** **−43**	WCE −8	**WB** **−7**	Haw −22	StK −37	**Coll** **−66**	Ess −48	BL −55	**WCE** **+20**	**PA** **+11**	Geel −46	**Syd** **−18**	**Rich** **−4**	NM −62	**Frem** **+63**	Carl −57	**StK** **−47**	X	X	X	X	16
North Melbourne	Melb +34	WB −15	**Haw** **−54**	**Ess** **+12**	**Rich** **−36**	**Coll** **−52**	**PA** **+5**	Geel −70	**Frem** **+13**	**BL** **−18**	**StK** **−46**	Adel −44	**WB** **−22**	Syd −15	Haw −9	Rich; 0	BL −41	**Carl** **−10**	**Melb** **+62**	WCE −38	StK +5	PA +4	X	X	X	X	13
Port Adelaide	**Ess** **+41**	WCE −50	**Melb** **+57**	Haw +30	**StK** **−66**	**Adel** **+26**	NM −5	**Rich** **+3**	Syd −55	Coll −38	**Frem** **+24**	WB −93	Geel −34	**BL** **+48**	Melb −11	**WCE** **+36**	Adel −70	**Haw** **+18**	Frem −42	**Carl** **−54**	BL −15	**NM** **−4**	X	X	X	X	10
Richmond	**Carl** **−83**	Geel −20	WB −47	**Melb** **−8**	NM +36	Syd −19	**BL** **−26**	PA −3	**Ess** **−40**	Frem +3	**WB** **−68**	**WCE** **+15**	StK −56	**Adel** **−17**	Carl −20	**NM**; **0**	Ess +5	Melb +4	**Syd** **−55**	**Coll** **−93**	**Haw** **−42**	WCE −80	X	X	X	X	15
St Kilda	**Syd** **+15**	Adel +32	**WCE** **+97**	**Frem** **+83**	PA +66	WB +28	Coll +88	**Ess** **+19**	**BL** **+16**	**Melb** **+37**	NM +46	Carl +9	**Rich** **+56**	**Geel** **+6**	WCE +20	**Adel** **+57**	**WB** **+45**	Syd +1	Haw +25	Ess −2	**NM** **−5**	Melb +47	**Coll** **+28**	X	**WB** **+7**	**Geel** **−12**	**1 (2)**
Sydney	StK −15	**Haw** **+38**	BL −33	**Carl** **+17**	Frem −21	**Rich** **+19**	Geel −51	**WCE** **+5**	**PA** **+55**	WB −40	Haw −11	**Coll** **−23**	Adel −16	**NM** **+15**	**Ess** **−35**	Carl −61	Melb +18	**StK** **−1**	Rich +55	**Geel** **−5**	Coll −41	**BL** **−8**	X	X	X	X	12
West Coast	BL −9	**PA** **+50**	StK −97	**WB** **+33**	Haw −18	**Frem** **−13**	**Melb** **+8**	Syd −5	**Coll** **−22**	Carl −41	**Geel** **−22**	Rich −15	**Haw** **+20**	Melb −20	**StK** **−20**	PA −36	Frem −5	**Ess** **+27**	WB +5	**NM** **+38**	Adel −74	**Rich** **+80**	X	X	X	X	11
Western Bulldogs	Frem +63	**NM** **+15**	**Rich** **+47**	WCE −33	**Carl** **−43**	**StK** **−28**	Adel +32	Melb +7	Geel −2	**Syd** **+40**	Rich +68	**PA** **+93**	NM +22	**Haw** **+88**	**Coll** **−1**	Ess +33	StK −45	**Frem** **+31**	**WCE** **−5**	BL +18	**Geel** **+14**	Coll +24	Geel −14	**BL** **+51**	StK −7	X	**3 (3)**
Team	1	2	3	4	5	6	7	8	9	10	11	12	13	14	15	16	17	18	19	20	21	22	F1	F2	F3	GF	Ladder

+	Win	Qualified for finals
−	Loss	Eliminated

Bold – Home game

== Ladder ==
2009 AFL ladder
Pos	Team	Pld	W	L	D	PF	PA	PP	Pts	
1	St Kilda	22	20	2	0	2197	1411	155.7	80	Finals series
2	Geelong (P)	22	18	4	0	2312	1815	127.4	72	Finals series
3	Western Bulldogs	22	15	7	0	2378	1940	122.6	60	Finals series
4	Collingwood	22	15	7	0	2174	1778	122.3	60	Finals series
5	Adelaide	22	14	8	0	2104	1789	117.6	56	Finals series
6	Brisbane Lions	22	13	8	1	2017	1890	106.7	54	Finals series
7	Carlton	22	13	9	0	2270	2055	110.5	52	Finals series
8	Essendon	22	10	11	1	2080	2127	97.8	42	Finals series
9	Hawthorn	22	9	13	0	1962	2120	92.5	36	
10	Port Adelaide	22	9	13	0	1990	2244	88.7	36	
11	West Coast	22	8	14	0	1893	2029	93.3	32	
12	Sydney	22	8	14	0	1888	2027	93.1	32	
13	North Melbourne	22	7	14	1	1680	2015	83.4	30	
14	Fremantle	22	6	16	0	1747	2259	77.3	24	
15	Richmond	22	5	16	1	1774	2388	74.3	22	
16	Melbourne	22	4	18	0	1706	2285	74.7	16	

Source: AFL ladder
Rules for classification: 1) points; 2) percentage; 3) number of points for.
(P) Premiers

=== Ladder progression ===
Numbers highlighted in green indicate that the team finished the round inside the top 8.
Numbers highlighted in blue indicates the team finished first on the ladder in that round.
Numbers highlighted in red indicates the team finished in last place on the ladder in that round.

Team ╲ Round	1	2	3	4	5	6	7	8	9	10	11	12	13	14	15	16	17	18	19	20	21	22
St Kilda	4	8	12	16	20	24	28	32	36	40	44	48	52	56	60	64	68	72	76	76	76	80
Geelong	4	8	12	16	20	24	28	32	36	40	44	48	52	52	52	56	60	64	64	68	68	72
Western Bulldogs	4	8	12	12	12	12	16	20	20	24	28	32	36	40	40	44	44	48	48	52	56	60
Collingwood	0	4	4	8	8	12	12	12	16	20	24	28	32	36	40	40	44	48	52	56	60	60
Adelaide	4	4	8	8	12	12	12	12	16	20	24	28	32	36	40	40	44	44	44	48	52	56
Brisbane Lions	4	4	8	8	8	12	16	20	20	24	24	28	32	32	36	40	44	44	46	46	50	54
Carlton	4	8	8	8	12	12	12	16	16	20	24	24	24	28	32	36	36	40	44	48	52	52
Essendon	0	4	8	8	12	12	16	16	20	20	20	24	28	28	32	32	32	32	34	38	38	42
Hawthorn	0	0	4	4	8	12	12	16	20	20	24	24	24	24	28	32	32	32	32	32	36	36
Port Adelaide	4	4	8	12	12	16	16	20	20	20	24	24	24	28	28	32	32	36	36	36	36	36
West Coast	0	4	4	8	8	8	12	12	12	12	12	12	16	16	16	16	16	20	24	28	28	32
Sydney	0	4	4	8	8	12	12	16	20	20	20	20	20	24	24	24	28	28	32	32	32	32
North Melbourne	4	4	4	8	8	8	12	12	16	16	16	16	16	16	16	18	18	18	22	22	26	30
Fremantle	0	0	0	0	4	8	12	12	12	12	12	12	12	12	12	12	16	16	20	20	24	24
Richmond	0	0	0	0	4	4	4	4	4	8	8	12	12	12	12	14	18	22	22	22	22	22
Melbourne	0	0	0	4	4	4	4	4	4	4	4	4	4	8	12	12	12	12	12	16	16	16

== Finals series ==
Qualifying and elimination finals
6 September, MCG
1	St Kilda	12.8 (80)
4	Collingwood	7.10 (52)
4 September, AAMI Stadium
5	Adelaide	26.10 (166)
8	Essendon	10.10 (70)
5 September, The Gabba
6	Brisbane Lions	16.15 (111)
7	Carlton	15.14 (104)
5 September, MCG
2	Geelong	14.12 (96)
3	Western Bulldogs	12.10 (82)

Semi-finals
12 September, MCG
Collingwood	12.11 (83)
Adelaide	11.12 (78)
11 September, MCG
Western Bulldogs	16.11 (107)
Brisbane Lions	8.8 (56)

Preliminary finals
18 September, MCG
St Kilda	9.6 (60)
Western Bulldogs	7.11 (53)
19 September, MCG
Geelong	17.18 (120)
Collingwood	6.11 (47)

Grand final
26 September, MCG
St Kilda	9.14 (68)
Geelong	12.8 (80)

=== Week one ===
	Qualifying and Elimination Finals
EF1: Friday, 4 September (8:15 pm)	Adelaide 26.10 (166)	def.	Essendon 10.10 (70)	AAMI Stadium (crowd: 50,393)	Report
QF2: Saturday, 5 September (2:30 pm)	Geelong 14.12 (96)	def.	Western Bulldogs 12.10 (82)	MCG (crowd: 74,007)	Report
EF2: Saturday, 5 September (7:30 pm)	Brisbane Lions 16.15 (111)	def.	Carlton 15.14 (104)	Gabba (crowd: 32,702)	Report
QF1: Sunday, 6 September (2:30 pm)	St Kilda 12.8 (80)	def.	Collingwood 7.10 (52)	MCG (crowd: 84,213)	Report

=== Week two ===
	Semi-finals
SF2: Friday, 11 September (7:45 pm)	Western Bulldogs 16.11 (107)	def.	Brisbane Lions 8.8 (56)	MCG (crowd: 47,030)	Report
SF1: Saturday, 12 September (7:30 pm)	Collingwood 12.11 (83)	def.	Adelaide 11.12 (78)	MCG (crowd: 62,184)	Report

=== Week three ===
	Preliminary Finals
PF1: Friday, 18 September (7:45 pm)	St Kilda 9.6 (60)	def.	Western Bulldogs 7.11 (53)	MCG (crowd: 78,245)	Report
PF2: Saturday, 19 September (7:30 pm)	Geelong 17.18 (120)	def.	Collingwood 6.11 (47)	MCG (crowd: 87,258)	Report

=== Week four ===
Grand Final
Saturday, 26 September (2:30 pm)	St Kilda	def. by	Geelong	MCG (crowd: 99,251)	Report
3.2 (20); 7.7 (49); 9.11 (65); 9.14 (68)	Q1; Q2; Q3; Final	3.0 (18); 7.1 (43); 9.4 (58); 12.8 (80)	Umpires: McBurney, Rosebury, Ryan; Norm Smith Medal: Paul Chapman (Geelong)
Schneider 2 Goddard, Hayes, Dempster, Jones, Koschitzke, Riewoldt, Montagna 1	Goals	3 Chapman; 2 Mooney, Hawkins, Rooke; 1 Selwood, Byrnes, Ablett
Gram, Hayes, Ball, Jones, Montagna, Baker, Goddard	Best	Chapman, Rooke, Milburn, Taylor, Selwood, Ablett, Corey, Bartel, Ling, Scarlett
Goddard (broken nose and collarbone), Riewoldt (torn adductor muscle)	Injuries	Chapman (hamstring), Taylor (broken hand)
Nil	Reports	Nil

== Awards ==
- The Brownlow Medal was awarded to Gary Ablett, Jr. of Geelong, who polled 30 votes during the home and away season.
- The AFL Rising Star was awarded to Daniel Rich of the Brisbane Lions, who received the maximum 45 votes.
- The Coleman Medal was awarded to Brendan Fevola of Carlton, who kicked 86 goals during the home and away season.
- The Wooden Spoon was "awarded" to Melbourne for the second year in a row. Melbourne finished the season in last place on the ladder after 22 rounds, with just 4 wins.
- The McClelland Trophy was awarded to St Kilda for finishing 1st on the ladder during the premiership season.
- The AFL Players Association Awards were as follows:
  - The Leigh Matthews Trophy was awarded to Gary Ablett, Jr. from Geelong for being the Most Valuable Player for the third year in a row.
  - The Robert Rose Award went to Joel Selwood from Geelong for being the Most Courageous Player throughout the premiership season.
  - The Best Captain award went to Jonathan Brown of the Brisbane Lions for the second time, after winning the award in 2007.
  - The Best First-Year Player award was won by Daniel Rich from the Brisbane Lions. Rich blitzed the competition, receiving 463 votes, and the runner-up receiving just 45.

=== Best and fairest ===
Club	Award name	Winner	Ref.
Adelaide	Malcolm Blight Medal	Bernie Vince	
Brisbane Lions	Merrett–Murray Medal	Jonathan Brown	
Carlton	John Nicholls Medal	Chris Judd	
Collingwood	Copeland Trophy	Dane Swan	
Essendon	Crichton Medal	Jobe Watson	
Fremantle	Doig Medal	Aaron Sandilands	
Geelong	Carji Greeves Medal	Gary Ablett / Corey Enright	
Hawthorn	Peter Crimmins Medal	Sam Mitchell	
Melbourne	Keith 'Bluey' Truscott Medal	Aaron Davey	
North Melbourne	Syd Barker Medal	Andrew Swallow	
Port Adelaide	John Cahill Medal	Warren Tredrea	
Richmond	Jack Dyer Medal	Brett Deledio	
St Kilda	Trevor Barker Award	Nick Riewoldt	
Sydney	Bob Skilton Medal	Ryan O'Keefe	
West Coast	Club Champion Award	Darren Glass	
Western Bulldogs	Charles Sutton Medal	Matthew Boyd	

=== AFL Rising Star ===
The 2009 award was won by Daniel Rich from the Brisbane Lions.

=== Goal of the Year ===
The Australian Football League celebrates the best goal of the season through the annual Goal of the Year competition. From 2009 onwards, the commercial name for the award is the AFL Stores Goal of the Year.

Nominations

- Round 1 – Shannon Hurn (West Coast)
- Round 2 – Jason Winderlich (Essendon)
- Round 3 – Taylor Walker (Adelaide)
- Round 4 – Ryan Houlihan (Carlton)
- Round 5 – Gary Ablett, Jr. (Geelong)
- Round 6 – Drew Petrie (North Melbourne)
- Round 7 – Cyril Rioli (Hawthorn) – Winner
- Round 8 – Michael Osborne (Hawthorn)
- Round 9 – Stephen Milne (St. Kilda)
- Round 10 – Mark LeCras (West Coast)
- Round 11 – David Rodan (Port Adelaide)
- Round 12 – David Rodan (Port Adelaide)
- Round 13 – Nic Naitanui (West Coast)
- Round 14 – Dale Thomas (Collingwood)
- Round 15 – Brendan Fevola (Carlton)
- Round 16 – David Rodan (Port Adelaide)
- Round 17 – Lance Franklin (Hawthorn)
- Round 18 – Leon Davis (Collingwood)
- Round 19 – Adam Schneider (St Kilda)
- Round 20 – Liam Jurrah (Melbourne)
- Round 21 – Brad Dick (Collingwood)
- Round 22 – Shannon Byrnes (Geelong)

=== Mark of the Year ===
The Australian Football League celebrates the best mark of the season through the annual Mark of the Year competition. From 2009 onwards, the commercial name for the award is the Hungry Jack's Mark of the Year.

Nominations

- Round 1 – Simon Wiggins (Carlton)
- Round 2 – Jay Schulz (Richmond)
- Round 3 – Matthew Lloyd (Essendon)
- Round 4 – Tom Logan (Port Adelaide)
- Round 5 – Tom Hawkins (Geelong)
- Round 6 – Joel Selwood (Geelong)
- Round 7 – Patrick Ryder (Essendon)
- Round 8 – Paul Bevan (Sydney)
- Round 9 – Heath Grundy (Sydney)
- Round 10 – David Mundy (Fremantle)
- Round 11 – Kurt Tippett (Adelaide)
- Round 12 – Nic Naitanui (West Coast)
- Round 13 – Josh Hill (Western Bulldogs)
- Round 14 – Darren Glass (West Coast)
- Round 15 – Jayden Post (Richmond)
- Round 16 – Liam Jurrah (Melbourne)
- Round 17 – Brendan Fevola (Carlton)
- Round 18 – Jimmy Bartel (Geelong)
- Round 19 – Quinten Lynch (West Coast)
- Round 20 – Lewis Roberts-Thomson (Sydney)
- Round 21 – Max Rooke (Geelong)
- Round 22 – Brett Burton (Adelaide) – Winner

=== AFL Army Award ===
The Australian Football League, with the support of the Australian Army, recognises players who produce an act or acts of bravery or selflessness to promote the cause of his team during a game. Each week three players and what they did are made available on the AFL Army Award website for supporters to vote on. The player with the highest percentage of the vote is the AFL Army Award nominee for that round.

Nominations

For the full list of round-by-round nominees, see 2009 AFL Army Award.

- Round 1 – James Kelly (Geelong)
- Round 2 – Campbell Brown (Hawthorn)
- Round 3 – Luke Ball (St Kilda)
- Round 4 – Ricky Dyson (Essendon)
- Round 5 – Lenny Hayes (St Kilda)
- Round 6 – Martin Mattner (Sydney)
- Round 7 – Bryce Gibbs (Carlton)
- Round 8 – Barry Hall (Sydney)
- Round 9 – Matt White (Richmond)
- Round 10 – Travis Varcoe (Geelong)
- Round 11 – Scott McMahon (North Melbourne)
- Round 12 – Brad Green (Melbourne)
- Round 13 – Patrick Dangerfield (Adelaide)
- Round 14 – Ryan Griffen (Western Bulldogs)
- Round 15 – Nathan Eagleton (Western Bulldogs)
- Round 16 – Jacob Surjan (PA Adelaide)
- Round 17 – Cameron Mooney (Geelong)
- Round 18 – Aaron Davey (Melbourne)
- Round 19 – Brett Kirk (Sydney)
- Round 20 – Stephen Milne (St Kilda)
- Round 21 – Max Rooke (Geelong)
- Round 22 – Tom Hawkins (Geelong) – Winner

== Club leadership ==
Club	Coach	Captain(s)	Vice Captain(s)/Leadership Group
Adelaide	Neil Craig	Simon Goodwin	Tyson Edwards, Brett Burton, Ben Rutten, Nathan van Berlo, Michael Doughty, Scott Stevens
Brisbane Lions	Michael Voss	Jonathan Brown	Simon Black, Luke Power, Jed Adcock, Daniel Merrett
Carlton	Brett Ratten	Chris Judd	Heath Scotland, Nick Stevens
Collingwood	Mick Malthouse	Nick Maxwell	Josh Fraser (vc), Scott Pendlebury (vc), Shane O'Bree, Dane Swan, Tarkyn Lockyer
Essendon	Matthew Knights	Matthew Lloyd	Scott Lucas (vc), Mark McVeigh, Adam McPhee, Andrew Welsh, David Hille, Jobe Watson
Fremantle	Mark Harvey	Matthew Pavlich	Luke McPharlin, Aaron Sandilands, Antoni Grover, Des Headland
Geelong	Mark Thompson	Tom Harley	Cameron Ling (vc), Joel Corey (dvc), Joel Selwood, Gary Ablett, Jimmy Bartel, Corey Enright
Hawthorn	Alastair Clarkson	Sam Mitchell	Luke Hodge (vc)
Melbourne	Dean Bailey	James McDonald	Cameron Bruce (vc), Brad Green, Brad Miller, Brent Moloney, Brock McLean
North Melbourne	Dean Laidley	Brent Harvey	Drew Petrie (vc)
Port Adelaide	Mark Williams	Domenic Cassisi	Shaun Burgoyne (vc), Kane Cornes (vc)
Richmond	Terry Wallace	Chris Newman	Nathan Foley, Kelvin Moore, Brett Deledio
St Kilda	Ross Lyon	Nick Riewoldt	Lenny Hayes
Sydney	Paul Roos	Brett Kirk	Craig Bolton, Adam Goodes
West Coast	John Worsfold	Darren Glass	Dean Cox (vc), Tyson Stenglein, Matthew Priddis, Adam Selwood, Beau Waters
Western Bulldogs	Rodney Eade	Brad Johnson

== Umpiring and rule changes ==
Two rule changes were introduced into the regular season

- If a player is not 'under pressure' and deliberately rushes a behind would be penalised by a free kick at the spot that the ball was rushed;
- If a player tackles an opponent after he disposes of the ball, preventing him from taking further part in the play, then a free kick and 50m penalty is paid.

Umpires were also encouraged to recall a centre bounce if it is offline, throwing it up the second time.

Players contacting umpires continued to be an issue with several players fined for making contact with umpires as they retreated from ball-ups. In related offences, Collingwood's Heath Shaw was suspended for one week after touching an umpire's shoulder, and Hawthorn president Jeff Kennett was fined $5000 after criticising the umpires on radio.

== Coach changes ==
Coach	Club	Caretaker Coach (for 2009)	Date	New Coach (2010– )
Terry Wallace	Richmond	Jade Rawlings	1 June 2009	Damien Hardwick
Dean Laidley	North Melbourne	Darren Crocker	16 June 2009	Brad Scott

== See also ==
- 2009 Australian football code crowds
