= Paul Chapman (Australian footballer) =

Australian rules footballer (born 1981)

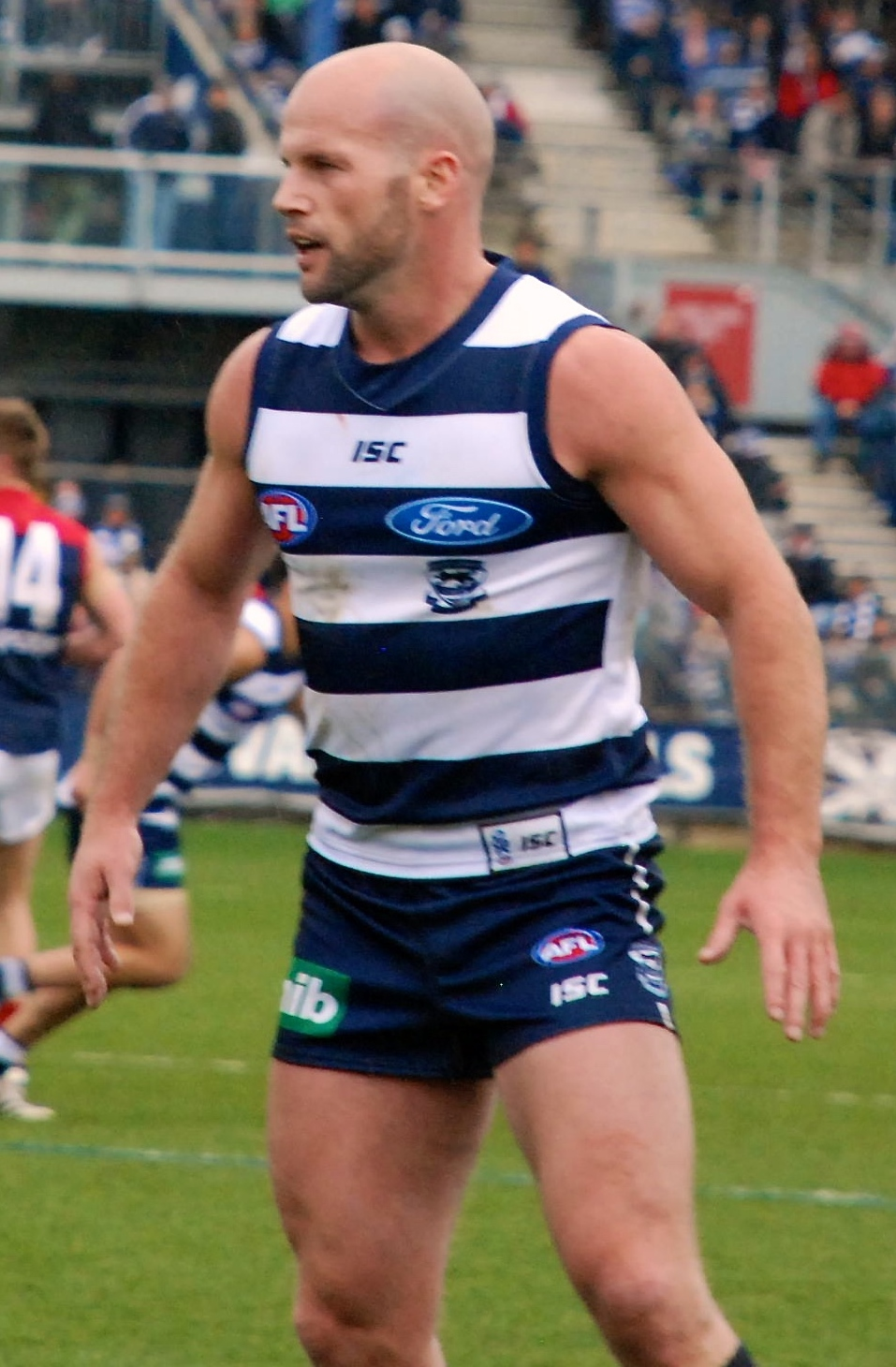
- Chapman playing for Geelong during the match against Melbourne which the Cats won by 186 points in July 2011.

Personal information
- Full name: Paul Chapman
- Born: 5 November 1981 (age 44)
- Original team: Calder Cannons (TAC Cup)
- Draft: No. 31, 1999 AFL draft, Geelong
- Height: 179 cm (5 ft 10 in)
- Weight: 87 kg (192 lb)
- Position: Forward / Midfielder

Playing career^{1}
Years	Club	Games (Goals)
2000–2013	Geelong	251 (336)
2014–2015	Essendon	29(30)
Total		280 (366)

Representative team honours
Years	Team	Games (Goals)
2008	Victoria	1 (1)
- ^{1} Playing statistics correct to the end of 2015.

Career highlights
- 3× AFL premiership player (2007, 2009, 2011); Norm Smith Medal: 2009; 2× All-Australian team: 2009, 2010; Carji Greeves Medal: 2006; 2× AFL pre-season cup: 2006, 2009; VFL premiership player: 2002

Paul Chapman (born 5 November 1981) is a former professional Australian rules footballer who played for the Geelong Football Club and Essendon Football Club in the Australian Football League (AFL).

== Early playing career ==
Chapman played with North Coburg Saints Football Club which merged with Fawkner Park to become Northern Saints Football Club in the EDFL, he played with the Calder Cannons in the under 18 TAC Cup competition.

== AFL career ==
=== Early career: 2000–2003 ===
Chapman was selected by Geelong Football Club with pick 31 in the 1999 AFL draft. He played 4 games, making his debut in round 12, 2000 against Collingwood, and kicked his first goal in the Elimination Final against Hawthorn, he finished 3rd in the Carji Greeves Medal. Chapman continued his improvement in the 2001 season where he would play 9 games for the season and kick two goals in Geelong's round 9 clash with Richmond.

Chapman's 2002 season was his breakout season he would go on to play 16 games for the season 15 of those games were the last 15 of the season. In round 9 Chapman would collect 26 disposals and also kick three goals this was Chapman's first ever 20+ possession game. At the end of the 2002 season Chapman was named Geelong's most improved player he would also finish 8th in Geelong's best and fairest award. Chapman was also a member of Geelong's VFL premiership team.

=== Building the Geelong premiership team: 2003–2006 ===
In 2003 Chapman officially joined the Geelong senior team playing all 22 games of the season. Chapman played his best game for the season in round 7 against the West Coast Eagles where he kicked 4 goals, Chapman also kicked a last minute game-winning goal against Richmond in Round 15. Chapman would play his 50th career game in round 21 against the Brisbane Lions. At the end of the 2003 season Chapman would be named best team and constructive player, he would also finish 8th in Geelong's Best and Fairest.

2004 would be Chapman's first AFL finals experience with Geelong making it all the way to the Preliminary Final only to be defeated by 9 points against the Brisbane lions, Chapman would play all 22 games of the season including all 3 finals. Chapman had double figure possessions in every game except one, he also kicked 38 goals for the season with multiple goals in 12 games. Chapman would finish the season 9th in Geelongs Best and Fairest award.

Chapman would only play 19 games in the 2005 season after he suffered an injury in round 19, Chapman would go on to miss the remaining 3 games and the finals series. Even though he was injured late in the season Chapman still booted 29 goals for the season kicking a goal in every game except one, Chapman would go on to finish 6th in Geelong's Best and Fairest award.

His 2006 season started well, winning the AFL Pre-Season Premiership defeating Adelaide by 8 points, he played his 100th game in round 5 against Sydney, losing by 22 points. At the end of the year Chapman won the Carji Greeves Medal polling 462 votes, ahead of Jimmy Bartel and Gary Ablett, Jr. and he polled 14 votes in the Brownlow Medal.

=== Norm Smith Medal, All Australian team and multiple premierships: 2007–2011 ===
Chapman picked up double figure possessions in every game he played he also booted 30 goals for the season, in round 12 he would boot his 100th career goal against the Brisbane Lions. Geelong finished first at the end of the season winning the McClelland Trophy. In Geelongs first qualifying final Chapman would kick 5 goals leading Geelong to a record-breaking 106-point victory. Chapman capped off his season by kicking 4 goals and taking an all-time great mark on the members flank in the 2007 AFL Grand Final helping his team claim a record 119-point victory over Port Adelaide. Chapman was runner up in the Norm Smith Medal count.

Chapman played his 150th game in round 16, 2008 against the Western Bulldogs and kicked his 200th career goal in round 21 against North Melbourne. Chapman played 19 games for the season and kicked 33 goals, a quarter of the way through Chapman played for the Victorian state team in the AFL Hall of Fame Tribute Match, the Victoria team won by 17 points. Geelong won the McClelland Trophy for the second year in a row, Chapman had 22 possessions and 1 goal, in the 2008 AFL Grand Final loss to Hawthorn by 26 points.

At the start of the 2009 season, Geelong won the AFL Pre-Season Premiership defeating Collingwood by 76 points. Chapman played 20 games for the season and kicked 31 goals for the year, Chapman also had a career high 41 disposals in round 6 and a career high 6 goals in round 18. Chapman went on to poll 12 votes in the Brownlow Medal, and made the All-Australian team for the first time. Geelong finished 2nd on the ladder and Chapman had a dominant finals series kicking 5 goals in the Preliminary final and 3 goals in the grand final. Geelong defeated St Kilda by 12 points in the 2009 AFL Grand Final, Chapman kicked the winning goal, and was also the winner of the Norm Smith Medal.

Chapman would make the All-Australian team for the second year in a row in 2010 where he played 21 games for the season booting 23 goals. Chapman also had 7 games with 30+ disposals. Geelong would finish 2nd on the ladder and go all the way to the Preliminary Final but were eliminated by Collingwood after losing by 41 points. Chapman would have 21 disposals and 1 goal in the game.

Chapman played 23 games of the 2011 season including 3 finals, he played his 200th game in Round 2 against Fremantle. Geelong finished 2nd on the ladder for the 3rd year in a row, they defeated Hawthorn in the Qualifying Final by 31 points, after a one-week break they went on to defeat West Coast in the Preliminary Final, they won by 48 points. For the fourth time in five years they made the Grand Final, where Chapman capped off his season with his third Premiership defeating Collingwood by 38 points.

=== Final years at Geelong: 2012–2013 ===
Chapman played 20 games in the 2012 season kicking 36 goals. Geelong would finish 6th on the AFL ladder only to be eliminated in the first week losing to Fremantle by 16 points. Chapman wasn't very effective in this game only collecting 11 disposals.

In 2013, Chapman only played eight games due to a hamstring injury, he kicked 12 goals for the season. Returning from injury as a sub in Round 22, he made an impact off the bench. Geelong finished 2nd on the ladder and he played his 250th game in the Qualifying Final against Fremantle where they lost by 15 points, the next week Geelong defeated Port Adelaide by 16 points in the Semi Finals advancing to the Preliminary Finals, only to lose to Hawthorn by 5 points. Chapman missed the game due to suspension. Chapman was delisted by Geelong on 2 October 2013, after strongly suggesting he wanted to play on, but Geelong's final thoughts were that he couldn't compete at top-level football anymore due to age.

=== Move to Essendon: 2014–2015 ===
On 18 October 2013, Chapman joined Essendon after being traded for pick 84. The Geelong champion couldn't have started his career at the Bombers any better, kicking four goals to lead Essendon to a round 1 win over North Melbourne. He continued to have a presence around goals for the Bombers, booting 22 goals from 20 games. He finished the season well after a quieter patch. Chapman would play in Essendon's first week elimination final against North Melbourne he booted 2 goals and collected 22 disposals despite Essendon losing by 12 points and being eliminated from the finals. The 33-year-old signed a one-year contract extension to play on in 2015.

Chapman's 2015 season was plagued with injuries as he would only play 8 games. On 25 August 2015, Chapman announced that he would retire after the club's round 22 home match against Richmond. After the round 22 game Chapman was carried off the field by his teammates to a standing ovation by the crowd.

== Statistics ==
Legend
G	Goals	K	Kicks	D	Disposals	T	Tackles
B	Behinds	H	Handballs	M	Marks

Season	Team	No.	Games	Totals							Averages (per game)						
Season	Team	No.	Games	G	B	K	H	D	M	T	G	B	K	H	D	M	T
2000	Geelong	35	4	1	0	14	7	21	4	8	0.3	0.0	3.5	1.8	5.3	1.0	2.0
2001	Geelong	35	9	4	4	56	22	78	18	23	0.4	0.4	6.2	2.4	8.7	2.0	2.6
2002	Geelong	35	16	16	5	178	79	257	46	52	1.0	0.3	11.1	4.9	16.1	2.9	3.3
2003	Geelong	35	22	22	15	239	103	342	85	58	1.0	0.7	10.9	4.7	15.5	3.9	2.6
2004	Geelong	35	25	38	19	240	113	353	96	80	1.5	0.8	9.6	4.5	14.1	3.8	3.2
2005	Geelong	35	19	29	17	222	97	319	76	49	1.5	0.9	11.7	5.1	16.8	4.0	2.6
2006	Geelong	35	22	31	19	331	153	484	134	89	1.4	0.9	15.0	7.0	22.0	6.1	4.0
2007	Geelong	35	19	30	15	289	127	416	112	75	1.6	0.8	15.2	6.7	21.9	5.9	3.9
2008	Geelong	35	19	33	13	253	131	384	102	54	1.7	0.7	13.3	6.9	20.2	5.4	2.8
2009	Geelong	35	20	37	17	342	194	536	130	53	1.9	0.9	17.1	9.7	26.8	6.5	2.7
2010	Geelong	35	24	23	16	412	264	676	133	99	1.0	0.7	17.2	11.0	28.2	5.5	4.1
2011	Geelong	35	23	24	14	312	228	540	122	104	1.0	0.6	13.6	9.9	23.5	5.3	4.5
2012	Geelong	35	21	36	15	292	136	428	107	94	1.7	0.7	13.9	6.5	20.4	5.1	4.5
2013	Geelong	35	8	12	7	91	71	162	27	34	1.5	0.9	11.4	8.9	20.3	3.4	4.3
2014	Essendon	3	20	22	16	250	148	398	112	83	1.1	0.8	12.5	7.4	19.9	5.6	4.2
2015	Essendon	3	9	8	4	74	51	125	23	31	0.9	0.4	8.2	5.7	13.9	2.6	3.4
Career			280	366	196	3595	1924	5519	1327	986	1.3	0.7	12.8	6.9	19.7	4.7	3.5
