= Stephen Milne =

Australian rules footballer, born 1980

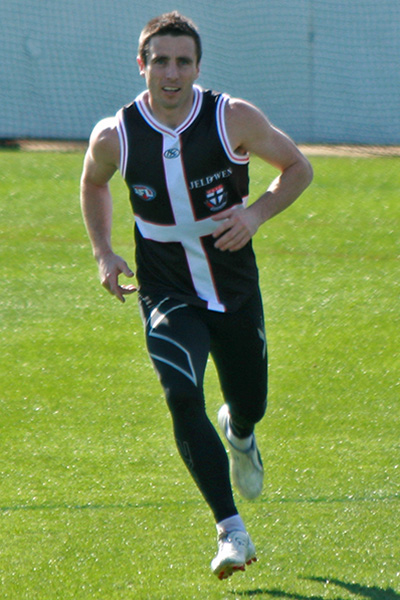

Personal information
- Nickname: Tip Rat
- Born: 8 March 1980 (age 46)
- Original team: Dandenong Stingrays (TAC Cup)/Essendon Reserves
- Draft: No. 23, 2000 Rookie Draft
- Height: 176 cm (5 ft 9 in)
- Weight: 83 kg (183 lb)
- Position: Forward

Playing career^{1}
Years	Club	Games (Goals)
2001–2013	St Kilda	275 (574)

International team honours
Years	Team	Games (Goals)
2002, 2011	Australia	2 (0)
- ^{1} Playing statistics correct to the end of 2013.

Career highlights
- 4x St Kilda leading goalkicker 2002, 2010, 2011, 2012; 2x All-Australian Team 2011, 2012; 2x Pre Season Premiership 2004, 2008

Stephen Milne (born 8 March 1980) is a former professional Australian rules footballer who played for the St Kilda Football Club in the Australian Football League (AFL). A small forward, he held the record for the most games played by a player originally drafted via the Rookie Draft; however, this was surpassed by the West Coast Eagles' Dean Cox in early 2014.

== AFL career ==
Milne was recruited to St Kilda from the Essendon reserves and placed on St Kilda's Rookie List after playing for the Dandenong Stingrays and Noble Park Football Club in the late 1990s.

=== 2001 ===
Milne was elevated to St Kilda's primary list from the club's rookie list prior to the start of the 2001 season. He played his first official AFL game in 2001 against Port Adelaide at Football Park in Round 4. He scored 2.1 in his first game and had 17 disposals in a losing side.

=== 2002 ===
He was St Kilda's leading goalkicker in 2002, kicking 50 goals from 21 matches in the 2002 AFL Premiership Season.

=== 2004 ===
Milne played in St Kilda's 2004 Wizard Home Loans Cup–winning side, the club's second pre-season cup win.

Later in 2004, Milne and teammate Leigh Montagna were at the centre of a police investigation of the alleged rape of a woman. No charges were laid; however, in June 2010, a former detective who was the lead detective in the case made claims that the case collapsed under internal pressure from within the Victorian police force and powerful club backers as well as another detective alleging the cost of the case was a factor. In 2012, the Office of Police Integrity concluded after a lengthy investigation that "the OPI investigators found no evidence to substantiate the allegation that police investigating the rape were subject to improper influence" On 18 June 2013, it was reported that Milne had been charged with four counts of rape over the 2004 incident.

=== 2005 ===
In the 2005 season, Milne again kicked more than 50 goals. In the final round of the season, against the Brisbane Lions, he had 15 kicks and kicked a personal best of 11 goals in the Saints' 139-point win. He finished with 61 goals from 24 matches.

=== 2006 ===
Milne played his 100th AFL game in round three, 2006, against the Brisbane Lions, kicking three goals as the Saints won by 37 points.

=== 2008 ===
Milne played in St Kilda's 2008 NAB Cup–winning side, the club's third pre-season cup win. He kicked three of St Kilda' nine goals in the final.

In 2008, during a game against Fremantle at Subiaco, he kicked three goals after a head clash. He was driven back from Perth with St Kilda medical staff to avoid the risk of further damage and arrived in Melbourne on the Thursday following the game. Despite this he was named to play in the game on the following Sunday, which was Robert Harvey's tribute game against Adelaide. He kicked two goals in a 20 possession game.

In the 2008 season, Milne kicked 60 goals from 24 matches.

=== 2009 ===
Milne played in 20 of 22 matches in the 2009 home-and-away rounds in which St Kilda qualified in first position for the 2009 AFL Finals Series, winning the club's third minor premiership.

St Kilda qualified for the 2009 AFL Grand Final after its qualifying and preliminary finals wins. Milne played in the grand final when St Kilda were defeated by Geelong by 12 points.

=== 2010 ===
On 9 April 2010, St Kilda played Collingwood in a Round 3 match. During the quarter-time break, words were exchanged between Milne and the Collingwood coach, Mick Malthouse, the focus of which in the media was an alleged comment Malthouse made calling Milne a 'rapist'. In a statement released by Collingwood, Malthouse apologised for his comments for which he was also fined $7500 by the AFL. Milne also stated that some comments he made to an opposition coach were inappropriate.

Under coach Ross Lyon, he has continued to develop his forward defensive skills and setting up play in addition to his ability to score goals.

Milne kicked his 400th career goal on 4 June 2010, in Round 11 against Richmond, scoring five goals for the game.

Mine played his 200th game the following week on 13 June 2010, in Round 12 against Fremantle, scoring four goals for the game.

He received three Goal of the Year nominations in 2010 in Rounds 5, 11 and 12.

St Kilda qualified for the 2010 AFL finals series in third position and won through to the 2010 Grand Final after wins over Geelong in the qualifying finals and Western Bulldogs in the preliminary finals.

Milne played in the drawn 2010 AFL Grand Final, in which he kicked two of St Kilda ten goals for the game against Collingwood. He was involved in the game's pivotal moment: St Kilda was trailing by one point with 90 seconds remaining, a 60m running shot by Lenny Hayes (St Kilda) landed 10m in front of the right behind post and in the vicinity of Milne and his opponent; the ball took one bounce 45° left toward the goal, then another bounce 90° right and went through for the tying behind, eluding Milne's efforts to gather the unpredictable ball. Some retrospective views of the match have criticised Milne for allowing the ball to bounce rather than attacking the ball harder, although whether this would even have been possible is debatable. St Kilda ended up losing the grand final replay the following week.

He was St Kilda's leading goalkicker in 2010 with 55 goals for the season prior to the 2010 AFL Grand Final Replay.

=== 2011 ===
In St Kilda's Round 21 home game against the Magpies, Milne became the first player in the history of the league to kick 300 goals at Docklands Stadium. He overtook the previous record of 299 set by former Essendon player Matthew Lloyd. Milne kicked the record-breaking goal in the final quarter. He is currently fifth on St Kilda's list of leading goalkickers in the club's history.

Milne was selected in the 2011 All-Australian team in the forward pocket. This was the first time in his career that Milne had been selected in the All-Australian team.

=== 2012 ===
Milne kicked his 500th career goal against the Melbourne Demons in Round 5, becoming the 50th player to kick 500 goals in the history of the VFL/AFL. Milne then played his 250th AFL game against Essendon in Round 15, kicking five goals in the Saints' 71-point victory.

During the 2012 season, his career achievements began to gain widespread recognition. Milne is only the 5th non-key-position forward to kick more than 500 goals in the history of AFL/VFL football. He is the only player shorter than 180 cm to kick more than 500 goals since Kevin Bartlett in the 1980s. He was described during 2012 as one of the best small forwards ever to play AFL football.

Milne finished the 2012 season with 56 goals from 22 games, and was selected in the 2012 All-Australian team, earning this recognition for the second time in his career.

== Retirement ==
On 25 August 2013, after St Kilda's Round 22 win against the Gold Coast Suns, Milne announced his retirement from AFL football from the last round of the home-and-away games. He played his last game on 31 August 2013 against Fremantle, which St Kilda won by 71 points. In 2014 and 2015, Milne played for Strathfieldsaye in the Bendigo Football League; in 2014, he was the league's leading goalkicker with 101 goals (including finals) and also won the club's best and fairest award, and he was part of the club's back-to-back premierships in 2014 and 2015. In 2016, Milne joined amateur football for Beaumaris in the VAFA Premier B, where he played in a senior team premiership, defeating St Bedes at Trevor Barker Oval in Sandringham. At the end of the 2018 season, Milne retired from football at the age of 38. Milne would return for a one-off game for the Gladstone Suns in a one-off exhibition match; in their defeat to the Yeppoon Swans, Milne kicked one goal.

== Allegations of sexual misconduct ==
In 2004, allegations of rape were made against Milne. The incident is alleged to have taken place on 14 March 2004 at teammate Leigh Montagna's home after celebrations for St Kilda's family day. It was alleged that a 19-year-old woman was raped in a bedroom of Montagna's home just after midnight. An investigation by the Sexual Crimes Squad of the Victorian Police force followed, which was led by Senior Detective Scott Gladman. The investigation concluded, and no charges were laid against Milne or Montagna.

On 18 June 2013, Milne was charged with four counts of rape over the 2004 incident. The decision to charge Milne followed extensive review of the initial investigation. On 5 July 2013, in a hearing at the Melbourne Magistrates' Court, Milne was not required to enter a plea and was bailed to return to the court on 13 September 2013.

On 13 September 2013, a committal hearing was set for at least three days, starting 12 November 2013.

On 15 November 2013, he was committed to stand trial on three counts of rape. Magistrate Peter Reardon found there was enough evidence to send the matter to the County Court for trial.

On 14 November 2014, Milne avoided a conviction for indecently assaulting a 19-year-old woman more than a decade previously. Milne pleaded guilty earlier in the month to a single charge of indecent assault, over an incident at the home of former St Kilda teammate Leigh Montagna in March 2004. The 34-year-old had been facing a trial in the Victorian County Court on three charges of rape, but those charges were withdrawn earlier in the month. At his plea hearing, the court heard Milne and another woman, and Montagna and the victim, had consensual sex in separate rooms, before Milne and the other woman went to Montagna's room. The two couples then engaged in more "sexual activity" before Milne attempted to have sex with the victim. The court heard the woman could not see in the darkness and believed Milne was Montagna. Judge Michael Bourke found Milne's offending was "out of character" and ordered him to pay a fine of $15,000.

The scandal continues to haunt Milne decades after the original incident. He was dropped from the 2026 edition of the E. J. Whitten Legends Game (despite playing the year before) after public backlash spearheaded by the Australian Femicide Watch.

== Statistics ==
Legend
G	Goals	K	Kicks	D	Disposals	T	Tackles
B	Behinds	H	Handballs	M	Marks

Season	Team	No.	Games	Totals							Averages (per game)							Votes
Season	Team	No.	Games	G	B	K	H	D	M	T	G	B	K	H	D	M	T	Votes
2001	St Kilda	44	17	27	20	132	26	158	50	14	1.6	1.2	7.8	1.5	9.3	2.9	0.8	0
2002	St Kilda	44	21	50	11	176	48	224	49	28	2.4	0.5	8.4	2.3	10.7	2.3	1.3	5
2003	St Kilda	44	14	26	19	97	20	117	28	13	1.9	1.4	6.9	1.4	8.4	2.0	0.9	2
2004	St Kilda	44	21	46	22	123	35	158	56	26	2.2	1.0	5.9	1.7	7.5	2.7	1.2	2
2005	St Kilda	44	24	61	20	204	64	268	85	36	2.5	0.8	8.5	2.7	11.2	3.5	1.5	6
2006	St Kilda	44	22	29	29	216	57	273	81	39	1.3	1.3	9.8	2.6	12.4	3.7	1.8	0
2007	St Kilda	44	22	32	22	223	47	270	98	37	1.5	1.0	10.1	2.1	12.3	4.5	1.7	0
2008	St Kilda	44	24	60	32	255	79	334	102	37	2.5	1.3	10.6	3.3	13.9	4.3	1.5	7
2009	St Kilda	44	23	46	28	213	93	306	108	65	2.0	1.2	9.3	4.0	13.3	4.7	2.8	2
2010	St Kilda	44	25	57	30	261	116	377	109	51	2.3	1.2	10.4	4.6	15.1	4.4	2.0	3
2011	St Kilda	44	23	56	33	231	77	308	93	59	2.4	1.4	10.0	3.3	13.4	4.0	2.6	5
2012	St Kilda	44	22	56	38	218	56	274	81	47	2.5	1.7	9.9	2.5	12.5	3.7	2.1	3
2013	St Kilda	44	17	28	20	152	46	198	60	17	1.6	1.2	8.9	2.7	11.6	3.5	1.0	2
Career			275	574	324	2501	764	3265	1000	469	2.1	1.2	9.1	2.8	11.9	3.6	1.7	37
