= Lenny Hayes =

Australian rules footballer (born 1980)

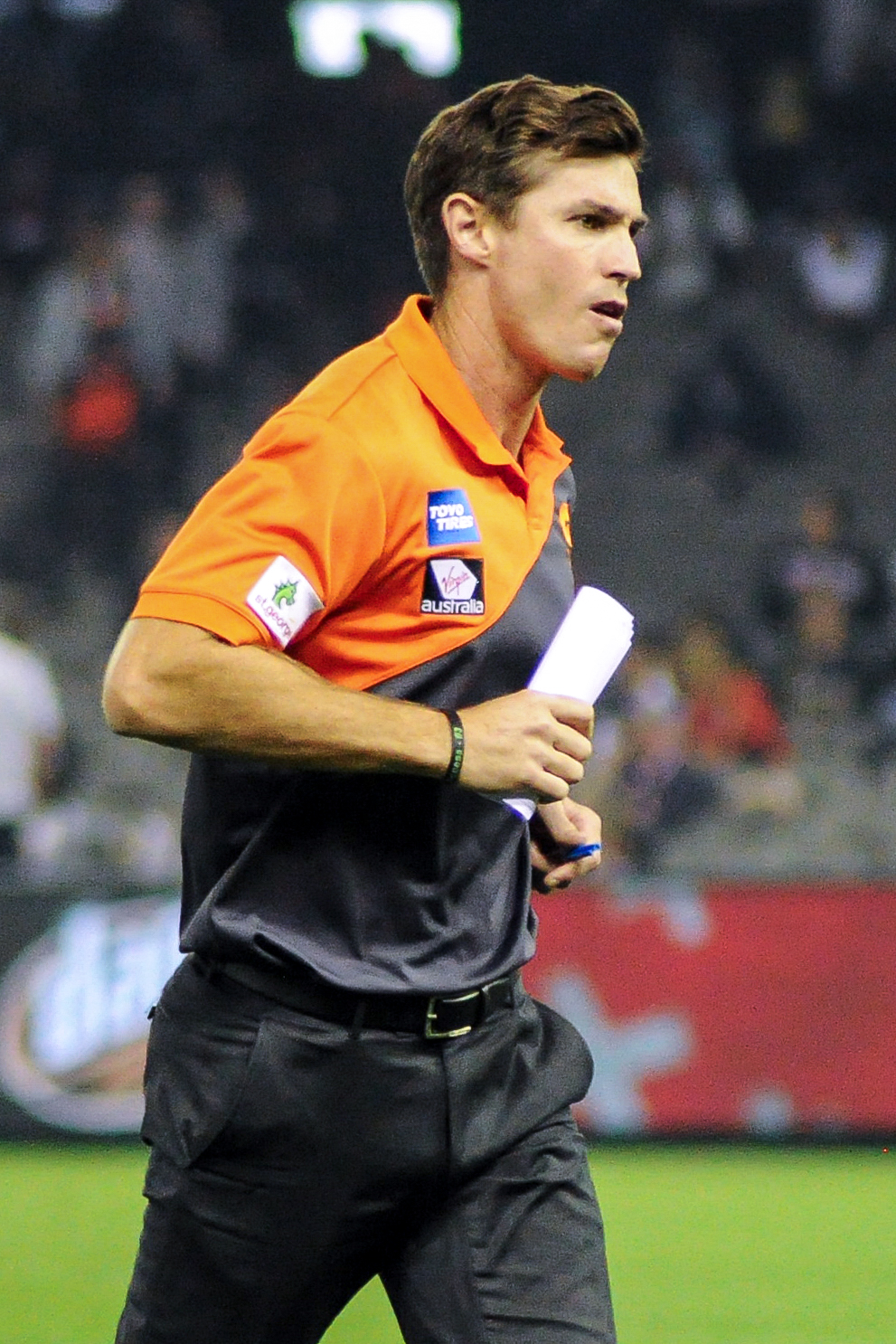
- Hayes in April 2018

Personal information
- Full name: Lenny Hayes
- Born: 14 January 1980 (age 46); Sydney, New South Wales
- Original team: NSW/ACT Rams (TAC Cup)/Pennant Hills
- Draft: No. 11, 1998 National Draft
- Height: 186 cm (6 ft 1 in)
- Weight: 83 kg (183 lb)
- Position: Midfielder

Playing career
| Years | Club | Games (Goals) |
| 1999–2014 | St Kilda | 297 (95) |

International team honours
| Years | Team | Games (Goals) |
| 2003 | Australia | 2 (0) |

Career highlights
- Norm Smith Medal: 2010; 2x Pre Season Cup (St Kilda) 2004, 2008; St Kilda Captain: 2004, 2007; 3× Trevor Barker Award: 2003, 2010, 2012; 3× All-Australian: 2003, 2005, 2009; AFL Rising Star nominee: 1999; Peter Badcoe VC Medal: 2009; Madden Medal: 2014; Australian Football Hall of Fame: 2020

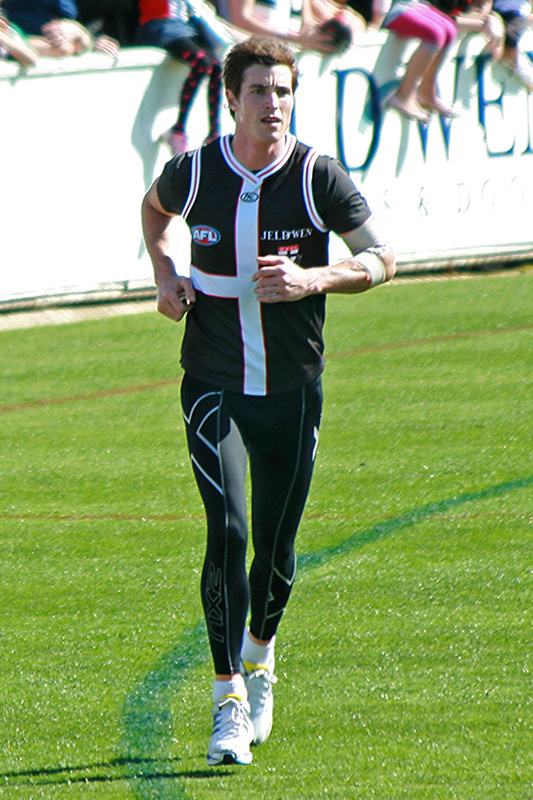
Hayes at training prior to the 2009 AFL Grand Final

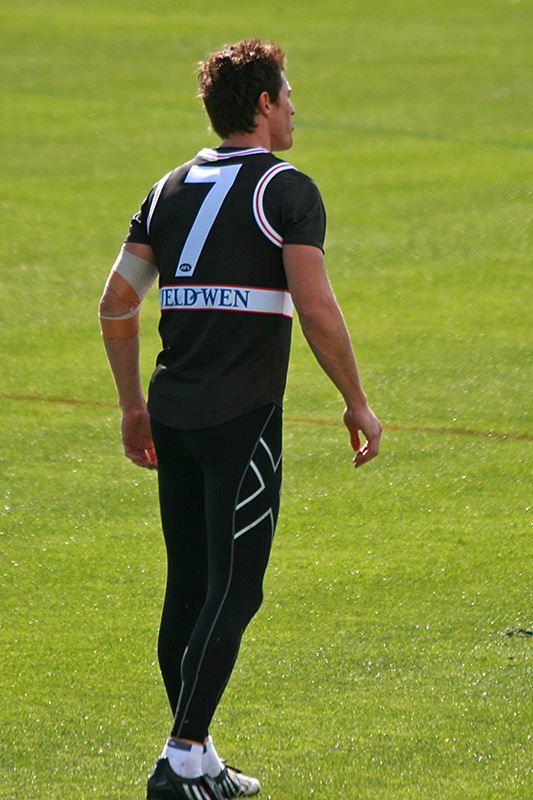
Hayes sporting his famous No. 7 jumper

Lenny Hayes (born 14 January 1980) is a former professional Australian rules footballer who played for the St Kilda Football Club in the Australian Football League (AFL) from 1999 to 2014. He is currently general manager of football at the St Kilda Football Club.

Growing up in Sydney, Hayes played TAC Cup football for the NSW/ACT Rams. He was recruited by St Kilda with the 11th pick in the 1998 National Draft and made his senior debut in round five of the 1999 season. He was nominated for the AFL Rising Star Award later in the year as well. Hayes was a first-choice player for St Kilda for virtually his whole career, other than in two seasons (2006 and 2011) where he would require knee reconstructions. After playing 297 games and kicking 95 goals, he retired at the end of the 2014 season.

Hayes would establish himself as one of the best midfielders in the league. He was named in the All-Australian team three times (in 2003, 2005 and 2009) and placed third in the 2009 Brownlow Medal (behind Gary Ablett and Chris Judd). Hayes was a three-time winner of the Trevor Barker Award as St Kilda's best and fairest player (in 2003, 2010 and 2012). He also spent two seasons as St Kilda's captain – in 2004 as sole captain and in 2007 as co-captain, alongside both Luke Ball and Nick Riewoldt. Hayes played in three Grand Finals without tasting premiership success, but won the Norm Smith Medal for his performance in the drawn 2010 AFL Grand Final. He was inducted into the Australian Football Hall of Fame in 2020.

== Early life ==
Hayes was born in Sydney, New South Wales, to mother Elizabeth and father Chris as one of two boys and two girls. Chris was an Australian rules player from Melbourne whose grandfather, Vin Maguire, Lenny's great-grandfather, played for the Geelong Football Club. Hayes grew up in suburban Sydney and, with the encouragement of Chris, began playing junior football with Pennant Hills in the Sydney AFL. In 1998, Hayes was a standout player for NSW/ACT in the representative TAC Cup, taking out the Morrish Medal as the best player in the competition. St Kilda picked Hayes at No. 11 in the 1998 National Draft.

He was educated at Redfield College.

== Playing career ==
=== 1990s ===
Hayes debuted in the AFL the following year. He started well and improved throughout the year, earning an AFL Rising Star nomination in the final round of the season (R22).

=== 2000s ===
With St Kilda's current policy being that of one to rotate the captaincy to a different player each season, Hayes would be named captain ahead of 2004.

After he was sworn into the role, Hayes captained St Kilda's 2004 Wizard Home Loans Cup winning side, in what was the club's second pre-season cup win.

After a strong start to the 2006 season, Hayes ruptured his anterior cruciate ligament against the Kangaroos in Round 9, requiring a minor knee reconstruction which sidelined him until the 2007 season. In just his fifth game back in the 2007 season he suffered a broken collarbone, sidelining him for three weeks, although he managed to come back and play 19 games for the year.

Hayes was a co-captain and part of the Saints' 2007 leadership group – dubbed the "Young Saints", which also included Justin Koschitzke, Luke Ball (co-captain) and Nick Riewoldt (co-captain). Additionally, others included in the leadership group were Aaron Hamill, Fraser Gehrig, Nick Dal Santo and Robert Harvey.

Hayes played in St Kilda's 2008 NAB Cup winning side, the club's third pre-season cup win.

In 2009, Hayes played his 200th AFL game in Round 9 against the Brisbane Lions at Docklands Stadium. During the match he gained 31 possessions in the Saints' 16-point victory. He finished third in the 2009 Brownlow Medal.

Hayes played in 19 of the 22 matches in the 2009 home and away rounds in which St Kilda qualified in first position for the finals series, winning the club's third minor premiership.

Hayes was recognised for his excellent season with selection in the 2009 All-Australian team as a midfield player. It was his third career selection in the All-Australian team.

St Kilda made the 2009 AFL Grand Final after qualifying and preliminary final wins. Hayes played in the Grand Final in which St Kilda were defeated by 12 points.

=== 2010s ===
Hayes played 25 games in 2010 (including 4 finals) and received a number of accolades for his performances during the season:

- Trevor Barker Award as St Kilda's best & fairest player.
- 2010 Norm Smith Medallist (1st Grand Final).
- St Kilda's player of the finals series (jointly with Zac Dawson).

Hayes injured his left ACL early in the 2011 season and did not play for the rest of the year.

Hayes played all games in 2012 and won his third Trevor Barker Medal as St Kilda's best & fairest player for the season. He had a fantastic season and made a brilliant recovery from the ACL injury from 2011. He played his 250th game in Round 9 against eventual premiers Sydney, gaining 25 disposals in a 28-point win for the Saints.

On 15 July 2014, Hayes announced his retirement in front of all his teammates and family. Out of respect, his teammates wore t-shirts with the hashtag #ilovelenny. At the time of his retirement, Hayes held the all-time VFL/AFL record for most tackles in a career, having laid 1,496 tackles at an average of 5.04 per game. He held the record until 23 April 2017, when he was overtaken by Matt Priddis.

== Coaching career ==
After working in the media for twelve months, Hayes returned home to Sydney in 2015 and joined Greater Western Sydney as an assistant coach. In 2022, St Kilda announced Hayes would return to St Kilda as an assistant coach.

== Honours and achievements ==
Team

- McClelland Trophy/AFL minor premiership: (St Kilda) 2009
- Pre Season Cup (St Kilda) 2004, 2008

Individual

- Norm Smith Medal: 2010
- St Kilda Captain: 2004, 2007
- 3× Trevor Barker Award: 2003, 2010, 2012
- 3× All-Australian: 2003, 2005, 2009
- AFL Rising Star nominee: 1999
- Peter Badcoe VC Medal: 2009
- Madden Medal: 2014
- Australian Football Hall of Fame: 2020

== Statistics ==
Legend
| G | Goals | K | Kicks | D | Disposals | T | Tackles |
| B | Behinds | H | Handballs | M | Marks |

| Season | Team | No. | Games | Totals | | | | | | | Averages (per game) | | | | | | |
| Season | Team | No. | Games | G | B | K | H | D | M | T | G | B | K | H | D | M | T |
|---|---|---|---|---|---|---|---|---|---|---|---|---|---|---|---|---|---|
| 1999 | St Kilda | 7 | 16 | 5 | 5 | 96 | 82 | 178 | 30 | 13 | 0.3 | 0.3 | 6.0 | 5.1 | 11.1 | 1.9 | 0.8 |
| 2000 | St Kilda | 7 | 22 | 10 | 5 | 200 | 148 | 348 | 49 | 46 | 0.5 | 0.2 | 9.1 | 6.7 | 15.8 | 2.2 | 2.1 |
| 2001 | St Kilda | 7 | 13 | 5 | 1 | 93 | 112 | 205 | 37 | 38 | 0.4 | 0.1 | 7.2 | 8.6 | 15.8 | 2.8 | 2.9 |
| 2002 | St Kilda | 7 | 20 | 7 | 5 | 200 | 203 | 403 | 66 | 100 | 0.4 | 0.3 | 10.0 | 10.2 | 20.2 | 3.3 | 5.0 |
| 2003 | St Kilda | 7 | 22 | 13 | 6 | 342 | 226 | 568 | 93 | 101 | 0.6 | 0.3 | 15.5 | 10.3 | 25.8 | 4.2 | 4.6 |
| 2004 | St Kilda | 7 | 23 | 4 | 6 | 266 | 245 | 511 | 93 | 129 | 0.2 | 0.3 | 11.6 | 10.7 | 22.2 | 4.0 | 5.6 |
| 2005 | St Kilda | 7 | 24 | 10 | 15 | 305 | 262 | 567 | 111 | 116 | 0.4 | 0.6 | 12.7 | 10.9 | 23.6 | 4.6 | 4.8 |
| 2006 | St Kilda | 7 | 9 | 4 | 3 | 133 | 91 | 224 | 48 | 50 | 0.4 | 0.3 | 14.8 | 10.1 | 24.9 | 5.3 | 5.6 |
| 2007 | St Kilda | 7 | 19 | 4 | 8 | 228 | 204 | 432 | 84 | 108 | 0.2 | 0.4 | 12.0 | 10.7 | 22.7 | 4.4 | 5.7 |
| 2008 | St Kilda | 7 | 24 | 5 | 12 | 256 | 322 | 578 | 105 | 144 | 0.2 | 0.5 | 10.7 | 13.4 | 24.1 | 4.4 | 6.0 |
| 2009 | St Kilda | 7 | 22 | 5 | 6 | 310 | 306 | 616 | 95 | 139 | 0.2 | 0.3 | 14.1 | 13.9 | 28.0 | 4.3 | 6.3 |
| 2010 | St Kilda | 7 | 25 | 9 | 10 | 341 | 344 | 685 | 93 | 177 | 0.4 | 0.4 | 13.6 | 13.8 | 27.4 | 3.7 | 7.1 |
| 2011 | St Kilda | 7 | 2 | 1 | 0 | 25 | 20 | 45 | 4 | 10 | 0.5 | 0.0 | 12.5 | 10.0 | 22.5 | 2.0 | 5.0 |
| 2012 | St Kilda | 7 | 22 | 7 | 8 | 255 | 283 | 538 | 71 | 130 | 0.3 | 0.4 | 11.6 | 12.9 | 24.5 | 3.2 | 5.9 |
| 2013 | St Kilda | 7 | 14 | 2 | 5 | 157 | 167 | 324 | 50 | 64 | 0.1 | 0.4 | 11.2 | 11.9 | 23.1 | 3.6 | 4.6 |
| 2014 | St Kilda | 7 | 19 | 4 | 6 | 198 | 247 | 445 | 71 | 118 | 0.2 | 0.3 | 10.4 | 13.0 | 23.4 | 3.7 | 6.2 |
| Career | | | 296 | 95 | 101 | 3405 | 3262 | 6667 | 1100 | 1483 | 0.3 | 0.3 | 11.5 | 11.0 | 22.5 | 3.7 | 5.0 |
