= Justin Koschitzke =

Australian rules footballer (born 1982)

Personal information
- Full name: Justin Gregory Koschitzke
- Born: 20 September 1982 (age 44); Albury, New South Wales
- Original team: Brocklesby (Hume FL)
- Draft: No. 2, 2000 National Draft, St Kilda
- Height: 197 cm (6 ft 6 in)
- Weight: 93 kg (205 lb)
- Positions: Forward, Ruck

Playing career
Years	Club	Games (Goals)
2001–2013	St Kilda	200 (247)

Career highlights
- AFL Rising Star: 2001; 2× AFL pre-season premiership player: 2004, 2008

Justin Gregory Koschitzke (born 20 September 1982) is a former Australian rules footballer who played for the St Kilda Football Club in the Australian Football League. He played 200 games and kicked 247 goals for the club between 2001 and 2013.

Hailing from the small town of Brocklesby, New South Wales, Koschitzke was taken with the second overall pick in the 2000 AFL National Draft. He debuted in round three of the 2001 season and then played every game for the rest of the year, subsequently winning the AFL Rising Star award. Standing 197 centimetres (6 ft 6 in) tall, Koschitzke generally played either as a ruckman or as a key-position forward. A number of his seasons were shortened by injury, especially early in his career. Koschitzke kicked a career-best 48 goals during the 2009 season, including one in the grand final loss to Geelong. He also played in the two 2010 grand finals against Collingwood.

== Career overview ==
Recruited in the 2000 AFL draft at pick number two, there were high expectations on Koschitzke from a young age. His athletic 197 cm build and strong marking were a great asset to the St Kilda Football Club, which drafted him and gave him his AFL debut early in 2001. He made an immediate impact and, in a debut year where he played 20 games, he won the AFL Rising Star award.

In 2002 Koschitzke played just four games in an injury-riddled season. His quad and hamstring injuries continued to cause him trouble into 2003 and 2004 when he missed five and eight games respectively.

Koschitske played in St Kilda's 2004 AFL Wizard Home Loans Cup winning side – St Kilda's second pre-season cup win.

In 2005, another injury-affected season, Koschitzke played sporadically until he made a return in Round 14 against the Western Bulldogs. In a best-on-ground performance he picked up 19 disposals and kicked three goals. His form continued when he kicked 16 goals over the next four games, but injury struck again after Round 21, causing him to miss the finals series.

Koschitzke is a key position player who can play as a centre half-forward and centre half-back, and as a ruckman.

=== 2006 season ===
In 2006 Koschitzke suffered further injury problems, first missing Rounds 1–3 with a minor knee injury and then missing Round 5 with a quadriceps injury. After being a surprise inclusion for Round 6 against the Bulldogs, he was knocked out by Daniel Giansiracusa with a then legal hip and shoulder. He was diagnosed with a fractured skull and was expected to miss four to six weeks. But four weeks later he had not regained hearing in one ear and, for future health concerns, was ruled out for the remainder of the season. Coach Grant Thomas later said that if he did return to play in 2007, it would be an unexpected bonus.

On 18 June 2006, Koschitzke collapsed while appearing on a live television spot for Channel Seven's program Sportsworld while being interviewed by David Schwarz. He was released from hospital later in the day after scans found nothing abnormal. St Kilda staff put the faint down to a number of factors including, fatigue, dehydration and a minor virus. There was no direct connection with his original injury and the collapse.

=== 2007 season ===
Koschitzke played 19 games in 2007, both in the forward line and the ruck, kicking 26 goals (season high four goals twice) and getting 155 hit outs (season high 21) and 116 marks (season high 10 twice).

After significant time in the ruck, more of a forward role beckoned for Koschitzke after Fraser Gehrig announced his retirement.

=== 2008 season ===
Koschitske was captain in St Kilda's 2008 NAB Cup winning side – St Kilda's third pre-season cup win.

=== 2009 season ===
Koschitske played in 20 of 22 matches in the 2009 AFL premiership season in which St Kilda qualified in first position for the 2009 finals series, winning the club's third minor premiership.

Koschitzke had one of his most consistent seasons in 2009 playing mainly at full-forward. He contributed to the Saints making the 2009 AFL grand final and polled 11 votes in the Brownlow Medal.

St Kilda qualified for the 2009 AFL Grand Final after qualifying and preliminary finals wins. Koschitske played in the grand final in which St Kilda were defeated by 12 points.

=== 2010 season ===
Koschitzke played 21 games in 2010, including four final matches, and kicked 30 goals.

As of the end of the 2010 season, Koschitzke had played in 14 finals matches, including three grand finals.

=== 2013 season ===
In the round five match against the Sydney Swans, played at the Westpac Stadium in Wellington, New Zealand, Koschitzke kicked the first goal of the game and thus made history as the first player in AFL history to score a goal outside Australia.

Koschitzke retired at the end of 2013 after an injury-riddled season. He was given a farewell match against Fremantle in round 23, when St Kilda had already been knocked out of finals contention. This brought him up to the significant milestone of 200 total senior games.

== Personal life ==
Koschitzke hails from the small country town of Brocklesby, New South Wales in the Riverina region, where his family has run a farm since 1922.

Justin is divorced with 2 children. Since then he resides in Melbourne with his fiance Leneila Lynne
