= 2009 St Kilda Football Club season =

St Kilda Football Club
2009 season
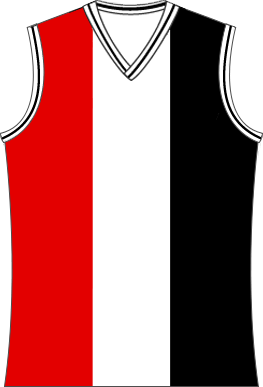
- St Kilda's guernsey for the 2009 season
- President: Greg Westaway
- Coach: Ross Lyon
- Captain: Nick Riewoldt
- Home ground: Docklands Stadium
- Preseason competition: First round
- Home and Away: 1st (minor premiers)
- Premiership: Runners up
- Best and Fairest: Nick Riewoldt
- Leading goalkicker: Nick Riewoldt (78)
- Average home attendance: 43,905 (home games in Melbourne including finals, does not include grand final)

St Kilda Football Club competed in the 2009 Australian Football League (AFL) premiership season. They won a club record 19 consecutive matches between Round 1 and Round 19 of the season and qualified for the 2009 finals series in first position as the minor premiers – the club's third minor premiership. The club won through to the 2009 AFL Grand Final after qualifying and preliminary finals wins, but they were defeated by Geelong by 12 points.

== Summary ==
=== NAB Cup ===
St Kilda was eliminated from the 2009 NAB Cup in the opening round, with Brisbane 1.8.8 (65) defeating St Kilda 0.8.8 (56).

=== Home and away rounds ===
In Round 1 of the 2009 season, Zac Dawson made a surprise debut for St Kilda after being promoted from the rookie list in time to confront Sydney at Docklands as St Kilda defenders Matt Maguire and Max Hudghton were injured. St Kilda 12.8 (80) defeated Sydney 9.11 (65) at Etihad Stadium in front of 32,442 spectators. In Round 2, Adelaide 10.9 (69) lost to St Kilda 15.11 (101) before 41,189 at AAMI Stadium. St Kilda 25.11 (161) defeated West Coast 9.10 (64) at Etihad Stadium in front of 29,006. Round 4 saw St Kilda defeat Fremantle by 83 points, and restrict them to 4.4 (28), their second-lowest ever score at that time and the equal-lowest score ever recorded at Etihad Stadium (tied with St Kilda's 3.10 (28) in 2002). In round 5, St Kilda restricted Port Adelaide to their second-lowest score in their club history, going down 15.12 (102) to 5.6 (36). The 6th round saw the Western Bulldogs 11.10 (76) lost to St Kilda 14.20 (104) in front of 36,302 at Etihad Stadium. Round 7 saw St Kilda and Collingwood play a Monday night game, the AFL's first for several seasons. St Kilda won easily 20.8 (128) to Collingwood 5.10 (40), making it the lowest Collingwood score under Mick Malthouse as coach. Round 8 saw St Kilda 13.12 (90) defeat Essendon 10.11 (71) at Etihad Stadium in front of 45,594. Round 9 saw St Kilda 14.13 (97) defeat the Brisbane Lions 13.3 (81) at Docklands Stadium in front of 30,673. In Round 10 St Kilda held Melbourne goalless in the second half of their 37-point victory, St Kilda 11.17 (83) to Melbourne 6.10 (46). In Round 11 St Kilda won its 11th consecutive game, breaking the previous club record of 10 set in 2004 by beating North Melbourne by 46 points, despite trailing by almost five goals in the first quarter. In Round 12 Carlton 14.11 (95) were defeated by St Kilda 16.8 (104) at Docklands Stadium in front of 50,820. In Round 13, St Kilda 13.14 (92) defeated Richmond 5.6 (36) at Docklands Stadium in front 38,196. The Round 14 clash between St Kilda and Geelong broke the previous record of the largest crowd at an AFL game held at Docklands Stadium with an attendance of 54,444. St Kilda 14.7 (91) defeated Geelong 13.7 (85). St Kilda extended its winning streak to 15 wins in round 15, with a hard-fought victory over West Coast 11.4 (70) to St Kilda 13.12 (90). Round 16 saw St Kilda 15.15 (105) defeat Adelaide 7.6 (48) at Etihad Stadium. In Round 17 St Kilda 16.10 (106) defeated Western Bulldogs 9.7 (61) at Etihad Stadium. Round 18 saw Sydney 13.15 (93) defeated by St Kilda 13.15 (94) at the SCG. Round 19 saw Hawthorn 7.7 (49) defeated by St Kilda 10.14 (74) at Aurora Stadium. Round 20 saw St Kildas first loss of the season proper kicking 16.12 (108) to Essendon 16.14 (110) at Etihad Stadium. Round 21 St Kilda 8.11 (59) lost to North Melbourne 10.4 (64) at Etihad Stadium. St Kilda played its first game at the MCG in Round 22 and defeated Melbourne 10.7 (67) to St Kilda 17.12 (114).

St Kilda qualified for the 2009 finals series in first position, winning the clubs third minor premiership with 20 wins and 2 losses, one of the most dominant home and away seasons ever in AFL history.

=== Finals series ===
In the first qualifying final, St Kilda 12.8 (80) defeated Collingwood 7.10 (52) at the MCG. In the first preliminary final, St Kilda 19.6 (60) defeated the Western Bulldogs 7.11 (53) at the MCG. In the grand final St Kilda 9.14 (68) lost to Geelong 12.8 (80) at the MCG.

== Fixtures ==
2009 Nab Cup Results
| Round | St Kilda | Opposition | Their Score | W/L | Diff | Stadium | Date |
|---|---|---|---|---|---|---|---|
| 1 | 0.8.8 (56) | Brisbane | 1.8.8 (65) | L | −9 | Carrara Stadium | 14/2/2009 |
2009 Season Results
| Round | St Kilda | Opposition | Their Score | W/L | Diff | Stadium | Date |
| 1 | 12.8 (80) | Sydney | 9.11 (65) | W | +15 | Etihad Stadium | 28/3/2009 |
| 2 | 15.11 (101) | Adelaide | 10.9 (69) | W | +32 | AAMI | 3/4/2009 |
| 3 | 25.11 (161) | West Coast | 9.10 (64) | W | +97 | Etihad Stadium | 11/4/2009 |
| 4 | 16.9 (111) | Fremantle | 4.4 (28) | W | +83 | Etihad Stadium | 18/4/2009 |
| 5 | 15.12 (102) | Port Adelaide | 5.6 (36) | W | +66 | AAMI | 24/4/2009 |
| 6 | 14.20 (104) | Western Bulldogs | 11.10 (76) | W | +28 | Etihad Stadium | 3/5/2009 |
| 7 | 20.8 (128) | Collingwood | 5.10 (40) | W | +88 | Etihad Stadium | 11/5/2009 |
| 8 | 13.12 (90) | Essendon | 10.11 (71) | W | +19 | Etihad Stadium | 17/5/2009 |
| 9 | 14.13 (97) | Brisbane Lions | 13.3 (81) | W | +16 | Etihad Stadium | 24/5/2009 |
| 10 | 11.17 (83) | Melbourne | 6.10 (46) | W | +37 | Carrara Stadium | 30/5/2009 |
| 11 | 15.13 (103) | North Melbourne | 9.3 (57) | W | +46 | Etihad Stadium | 6/6/2009 |
| 12 | 16.8 (104) | Carlton | 14.11 (95) | W | +9 | Etihad Stadium | 12/6/2009 |
| 13 | 13.14 (92) | Richmond | 5.6 (36) | W | +56 | Etihad Stadium | 28/6/2009 |
| 14 | 14.7 (91) | Geelong | 13.7 (85) | W | +6 | Etihad Stadium | 5/7/2009 |
| 15 | 13.12 (90) | West Coast | 11.4 (70) | W | +20 | Subiaco | 12/7/2009 |
| 16 | 15.15 (105) | Adelaide | 7.6 (48) | W | +57 | Etihad Stadium | 19/7/2009 |
| 17 | 16.10 (106) | Western Bulldogs | 9.7 (61) | W | +45 | Etihad Stadium | 25/7/2009 |
| 18 | 13.16 (94) | Sydney | 13.15 (93) | W | +1 | SCG | 1/8/2009 |
| 19 | 10.14 (74) | Hawthorn | 7.7 (49) | W | +25 | Aurora | 8/8/2009 |
| 20 | 16.12 (108) | Essendon | 16.14 (110) | L | −2 | Etihad Stadium | 16/8/2009 |
| 21 | 8.11 (59) | North Melbourne | 10.4 (64) | L | −5 | Etihad Stadium | 23/8/2009 |
| 22 | 17.12 (114) | Melbourne | 10.7 (67) | W | +47 | MCG | 30/8/2009 |
2009 Finals Series Results
| Round | St Kilda | Opposition | Their Score | W/L | Diff | Stadium | Date |
| QF1 | 12.8 (80) | Collingwood | 7.10 (52) | W | +28 | MCG | 6/9/2009 |
| PF1 | 9.6 (60) | Western Bulldogs | 7.11 (53) | W | +7 | MCG | 18/9/2009 |
| GF | 9.14 (68) | Geelong | 12.8 (80) | L | −12 | MCG | 26/9/2009 |

(Note: in the table above, green rows are wins, red rows are losses. In the Score column St Kilda scores are always shown first.)

== Squad ==
| 1 (Victoria (state)) Jason Gram 2 (Victoria (state)) Steven King 3 (Northern Territory) Xavier Clarke 5 (Victoria (state)) Ben McEvoy 6 (Victoria (state)) Leigh Fisher 7 (New South Wales) Lenny Hayes 10 (Victoria (state)) Steven Baker 11 (Victoria (state)) Leigh Montagna 12 (Tasmania) Nick Riewoldt 13 (New South Wales) Adam Schneider 14 (Victoria (state)) Luke Ball 15 (Western Australia) Michael Gardiner 16 (Northern Territory) Raphael Clarke 17 (Republic of Ireland) Colm Begley 18 (Victoria (state)) Brendon Goddard 19 (New South Wales) Sam Gilbert | 20 (Queensland) David Armitage 21 (Victoria (state)) Nick Heyne 22 (Western Australia) Farren Ray 23 (New South Wales) Justin Koschitzke 24 (Victoria (state)) Sean Dempster 25 (South Australia) Sam Fisher 26 (Victoria (state)) Nick Dal Santo 27 (Victoria (state)) Jason Blake 28 (South Australia) Rhys Stanley 29 (Victoria (state)) Tom Lynch 31 (Victoria (state)) Matthew Maguire 32 (Victoria (state)) Andrew McQualter 33 (Victoria (state)) James Gwilt 34 (Victoria (state)) Jack Steven 37 (Victoria (state)) Eljay Connors 38 (Western Australia) Clinton Jones | 39 (Western Australia) Alistair Smith 40 (Victoria (state)) Robert Eddy 41 (South Australia) Paul Cahill 42 (Victoria (state)) Jarryn Geary 44 (Victoria (state)) Stephen Milne Rookies: 30 (Queensland) Brad Howard 43 (Victoria (state)) Zac Dawson 45 (Western Australia) Luke Miles 46 (New South Wales) Khan Haretuku 47 (Victoria (state)) Tom Simpkin 48 (New South Wales) Blake McGrath 49 (Victoria (state)) Steven Gaertner 50 (Northern Territory) Ross Tungatulum 51 (Victoria (state)) Sam McGarry |

== Squad changes ==
- 2008 Trade Week: St Kilda completed a trade with the Western Bulldogs to have Farren Ray and Draft Pick #48 in return for St Kilda giving up Draft Pick #31 to the Bulldogs.
- 2008 National Draft: Tom Lynch, Rhys Stanley, Nicholas Heyne, Alistair Smith, Paul Cahill, Colm Begley
- 2009 Rookie Draft: Zac Dawson, Tom Simpkin, Brad Howard, Steven Gaertner, Ross Tungatulum, Samuel McGarry, Blake McGrath

== Ladder ==
2009 AFL ladder
| Pos | Team | Pld | W | L | D | PF | PA | PP | Pts | |
|---|---|---|---|---|---|---|---|---|---|---|
| 1 | St Kilda | 22 | 20 | 2 | 0 | 2197 | 1411 | 155.7 | 80 | Finals series |
| 2 | Geelong (P) | 22 | 18 | 4 | 0 | 2312 | 1815 | 127.4 | 72 | Finals series |
| 3 | Western Bulldogs | 22 | 15 | 7 | 0 | 2378 | 1940 | 122.6 | 60 | Finals series |
| 4 | Collingwood | 22 | 15 | 7 | 0 | 2174 | 1778 | 122.3 | 60 | Finals series |
| 5 | Adelaide | 22 | 14 | 8 | 0 | 2104 | 1789 | 117.6 | 56 | Finals series |
| 6 | Brisbane Lions | 22 | 13 | 8 | 1 | 2017 | 1890 | 106.7 | 54 | Finals series |
| 7 | Carlton | 22 | 13 | 9 | 0 | 2270 | 2055 | 110.5 | 52 | Finals series |
| 8 | Essendon | 22 | 10 | 11 | 1 | 2080 | 2127 | 97.8 | 42 | Finals series |
| 9 | Hawthorn | 22 | 9 | 13 | 0 | 1962 | 2120 | 92.5 | 36 | |
| 10 | Port Adelaide | 22 | 9 | 13 | 0 | 1990 | 2244 | 88.7 | 36 | |
| 11 | West Coast | 22 | 8 | 14 | 0 | 1893 | 2029 | 93.3 | 32 | |
| 12 | Sydney | 22 | 8 | 14 | 0 | 1888 | 2027 | 93.1 | 32 | |
| 13 | North Melbourne | 22 | 7 | 14 | 1 | 1680 | 2015 | 83.4 | 30 | |
| 14 | Fremantle | 22 | 6 | 16 | 0 | 1747 | 2259 | 77.3 | 24 | |
| 15 | Richmond | 22 | 5 | 16 | 1 | 1774 | 2388 | 74.3 | 22 | |
| 16 | Melbourne | 22 | 4 | 18 | 0 | 1706 | 2285 | 74.7 | 16 | |

Source: AFL ladder
Rules for classification: 1) points; 2) percentage; 3) number of points for.
(P) Premiers
