= 2010 St Kilda Football Club season =

St Kilda Football Club
2010 season
- St Kilda
- President: Greg Westaway
- Coach: Ross Lyon
- Captain: Nick Riewoldt
- Home ground: Etihad Stadium
- Pre-season competition: Runner up
- AFL season: 3rd
- Finals series: Runners up
- Best and Fairest: Lenny Hayes

The St Kilda Football Club competed in the 2010 Australian Football League (AFL) premiership season. They finished the home and away season in third place. They won through to the 2010 Grand Final after qualifying and preliminary finals wins and drew with Collingwood in the grand final, however they were beaten in the replay to finish runner up for the second consecutive year.

A number of new records were set by the Saints throughout 2010:

- A new membership record, reported by the club to be 40,544 and the first time the membership has been over 40,000. This bettered the previous record membership of 33,522 in 2009.
- The Round 2 win against North Melbourne by 104 points was a new St Kilda winning margin record against North Melbourne.
- A new record home and away game crowd for a match between St Kilda and Geelong of 58,208 was established in Round 13 at the Melbourne Cricket Ground, the fourth largest home game crowd in the club's history and only the sixth home and away home game the club has played at the MCG in 114 years. It was also a new record crowd for a St Kilda home game against Geelong.
- The Round 16 away game crowd of 81,836 against Collingwood at the Melbourne Cricket Ground was a new record attendance for a home and away game involving St Kilda. It was also a new record crowd for a St Kilda away game against Collingwood.
- The Round 17 home crowd of 49,373 against Hawthorn at Docklands was a new home and away game crowd record for a match between St Kilda and Hawthorn.
- The Round 19 win against Port Adelaide by 94 points was a new St Kilda winning margin record against Port Adelaide.

== 2010 players list ==
1 Jason Gram 2 Steven King 3 Jack Steven 4 Clinton Jones 5 Ben McEvoy 6 Zac Dawson 7 Lenny Hayes VC 10 Steven Baker 11 Leigh Montagna 12 Nick Riewoldt C 13 Adam Schneider 14 Jarryn Geary 15 Michael Gardiner 16 Raphael Clarke 17 Nicholas Winmar 18 Brendon Goddard 19 Sam Gilbert	20 David Armitage 21 Nick Heyne 22 Farren Ray 23 Justin Koschitzke 24 Sean Dempster 25 Sam Fisher 26 Nick Dal Santo 27 Jason Blake 28 Rhys Stanley 29 Tom Lynch 30 Brett Peake 31 Jesse Smith 32 Andrew McQualter 33 James Gwilt 34 Adam Pattison 38 Will Johnson 39 Alistair Smith	40 Robert Eddy 41 Paul Cahill 44 Stephen Milne 45 Luke Miles Rookies: 36 Tomas Walsh 37 Leigh Fisher 42 Daniel Archer 43 Mark Hutchings 47 Tom Simpkin 48 Blake McGrath 49 Steven Gaertner 50 Jarryd Allen

== 2010 Preseason ==
=== NAB Cup ===
St Kilda qualified for the NAB cup Grand Final however were beaten by the Western bulldogs in to finish Runner up.

**Rd**	**Date and local time**	**Opponent**	**Scores** (St Kilda's scores indicated in **bold**)			**Venue**	**Attendance**
**Rd**	**Date and local time**	**Opponent**	Home	Away	Result	**Venue**	**Attendance**
1	Friday, 19 February (7:40 pm)	Collingwood	**2.13.4 (100)**	1.13.12 (99)	Won by 1 point	Etihad Stadium (H)	29,801
2	Saturday, 27 February (7:10 pm)	Sydney	**2.9.7 (79)**	0.12.6 (78)	Won by 1 point	Etihad Stadium (H)	10,998
3	Saturday, 6 March (7:10 pm)	Fremantle	**2.15.7 (115)**	2.3.9 (45)	Won by 70 points	Etihad Stadium (H)	5,241
GF	Saturday, 13 March (7:10 pm)	Western Bulldogs	2.13.8 (104)	**0.9.10 (64)**	Lost by 40 points	Etihad Stadium (A)	42,381

=== Regular season ===
**Rd**	**Date and local time**	**Opponent**	**Scores** (St Kilda's scores indicated in **bold**)			**Venue**	**Attendance**	**Ladder**
**Rd**	**Date and local time**	**Opponent**	Home	Away	Result	**Venue**	**Attendance**	**Ladder**
1	Saturday, 27 March (7:10 pm)	Sydney	13.10 (88)	**15.6 (96)**	Won by 8 points	ANZ Stadium (A)	31,330	8th
2	Saturday, 3 April (7:10 pm)	North Melbourne	**23.5 (143)**	6.9 (39)	Won by 104 points	Etihad Stadium (H)	32,006	1st
3	Friday, 9 April (7:40 pm)	Collingwood	**10.9 (69)**	4.17 (41)	Won by 28 points	Etihad Stadium (H)	49,669	1st
4	Sunday, 18 April (4:40 pm)	Fremantle	**16.12 (108)**	14.9 (93)	Won by 15 points	Etihad Stadium (H)	29,814	1st
5	Saturday, 24 April (7:10 pm)	Port Adelaide	7.12 (54)	**6.8 (44)**	Lost by 10 points	AAMI Stadium (A)	23,355	2nd
6	Friday, 30 April (7:40 pm)	Western Bulldogs	6.10 (46)	**7.7 (49)**	Won by 3 points	Etihad Stadium (A)	43,072	3rd
7	Monday, 10 May (7:20 pm)	Carlton	**9.14 (68)**	20.9 (129)	Lost by 61 points	Etihad Stadium (H)	42,866	5th
8	Sunday, 16 May (4:40 pm)	Essendon	**11.15 (81)**	14.9 (93)	Lost by 12 points	Etihad Stadium (H)	39,204	7th
9	Sunday, 23 May (2:40 pm)	West Coast	8.8 (56)	**13.13 (91)**	Won by 35 points	Subiaco Oval (A)	36,244	5th
10	Saturday, 29 May (7:10 pm)	Adelaide	**19.9 (123)**	12.4 (76)	Won by 47 points	Etihad Stadium (H)	28,708	4th
11	Friday, 4 June (7:40 pm)	Richmond	8.11 (59)	**14.13 (97)**	Won by 38 points	Etihad Stadium (A)	32,858	3rd
12	Sunday, 13 June (2:40 pm)	Fremantle	10.7 (67)	**12.13 (85)**	Won by 18 points	Subiaco Oval (A)	37,569	2nd
13	Friday, 25 June (7:40 pm)	Geelong	**10.10 (70)**	6.10 (46)	Won by 24 points	MCG (H)	58,208	2nd
14	Sunday, 4 July (4:40 pm)	Melbourne	**15.10 (100)**	9.11 (65)	Won by 35 points	Etihad Stadium (H)	31,993	2nd
15	Saturday, 10 July (7:10 pm)	Brisbane Lions	10.5 (65)	**11.13 (79)**	Won by 14 points	The Gabba (A)	29,329	2nd
16	Saturday, 17 July (2:10 pm)	Collingwood	15.10 (100)	**6.16 (52)**	Lost by 48 points	MCG (A)	81,386	3rd
17	Friday, 23 July (7:40 pm)	Hawthorn	**14.3 (87)**	13.9 (87)	Draw	Etihad Stadium (H)	49,373	3rd
18	Friday, 30 July (7:40 pm)	Essendon	16.12 (108)	**11.9 (75)**	Lost by 33 points	Etihad Stadium (A)	37,165	3rd
19	Sunday, 8 August (1:10 pm)	Port Adelaide	**23.13 (151)**	8.9 (57)	Won by 94 points	Etihad Stadium (H)	22,467	3rd
20	Sunday, 15 August (4:40 pm)	North Melbourne	9.9 (63)	**17.13 (115)**	Won by 52 points	Etihad Stadium (A)	23,118	3rd
21	Saturday, 21 August (2:10 pm)	Richmond	**17.13 (115)**	14.10 (94)	Won by 21 points	Etihad Stadium (H)	33,790	3rd
22	Saturday, 28 August (3:40 pm)	Adelaide	9.11 (65)	**5.7 (37)**	Lost by 28 points	AAMI Stadium (A)	38,121	3rd

=== 2010 Finals Series ===
**Final**	**Date and local time**	**Opponent**	**Scores** (St Kilda's scores indicated in **bold**)			**Venue**	**Attendance**
**Final**	**Date and local time**	**Opponent**	Home	Away	Result	**Venue**	**Attendance**
Second Qualifying	Friday, 3 September (7:45pm)	Geelong	11.13 (79)	**12.11 (83)**	Won by 4 points	MCG (A)	63,608
Second Preliminary	Saturday, 18 September (7:20pm)	Western Bulldogs	**13.10 (88)**	8.16 (64)	Won by 24 points	MCG (H)	62,694
Grand Final	Saturday, 25 September (2:30pm)	Collingwood	9.14 (68)	**10.8 (68)**	Draw	MCG (A)	100,016
Grand Final Replay	Saturday, 2 October (2:30pm)	Collingwood	16.12 (108)	**7.10 (52)**	Lost by 56 points	MCG (A)	93,853

Qualifying and elimination finals
4 Sep, MCG
1	**Collingwood**	**17.22 (124)**
4	Western Bulldogs	8.14 (62)
5 Sep, ANZ Stadium
5	**Sydney**	**14.15 (99)**
8	Carlton	13.16 (94)
4 Sep, Subiaco Oval
6	**Fremantle**	**14.10 (94)**
7	Hawthorn	8.16 (64)
3 Sep, MCG
2	Geelong	11.13 (79)
3	**St Kilda**	**12.11 (83)**

Semi-finals
11 Sep, MCG
**Western Bulldogs**	**11.11 (77)**
Sydney	10.12 (72)
10 Sep, MCG
**Geelong**	**20.15 (135)**
Fremantle	10.6 (66)

Preliminary finals
17 Sep, MCG
**Collingwood**	**18.12 (120)**
Geelong	11.13 (79)
18 Sep, MCG
**St Kilda**	**13.10 (88)**
Western Bulldogs	8.16 (64)

Grand final and replay
25 Sep, MCG; Replay: 2 Oct MCG
**Collingwood**	9.14 (68)	**16.12 (108)**
St Kilda	10.8 (68)	7.10 (52)

== Ladder ==
2010 AFL ladder
Pos	Team	Pld	W	L	D	PF	PA	PP	Pts	
1	Collingwood (P)	22	17	4	1	2349	1658	141.7	70	Finals series
2	Geelong	22	17	5	0	2518	1702	147.9	68	Finals series
3	St Kilda	22	15	6	1	1935	1591	121.6	62	Finals series
4	Western Bulldogs	22	14	8	0	2174	1734	125.4	56	Finals series
5	Sydney	22	13	9	0	2017	1863	108.3	52	Finals series
6	Fremantle	22	13	9	0	2168	2087	103.9	52	Finals series
7	Hawthorn	22	12	9	1	2044	1847	110.7	50	Finals series
8	Carlton	22	11	11	0	2143	1983	108.1	44	Finals series
9	North Melbourne	22	11	11	0	1930	2208	87.4	44	
10	Port Adelaide	22	10	12	0	1749	2123	82.4	40	
11	Adelaide	22	9	13	0	1763	1870	94.3	36	
12	Melbourne	22	8	13	1	1863	1971	94.5	34	
13	Brisbane Lions	22	7	15	0	1775	2158	82.3	28	
14	Essendon	22	7	15	0	1930	2402	80.3	28	
15	Richmond	22	6	16	0	1714	2348	73.0	24	
16	West Coast	22	4	18	0	1773	2300	77.1	16	

Source: AFL ladder
Rules for classification: 1) points; 2) percentage; 3) number of points for.
(P) Premiers
