= Sam Fisher (Australian footballer) =

Australian rules footballer (born 1982)

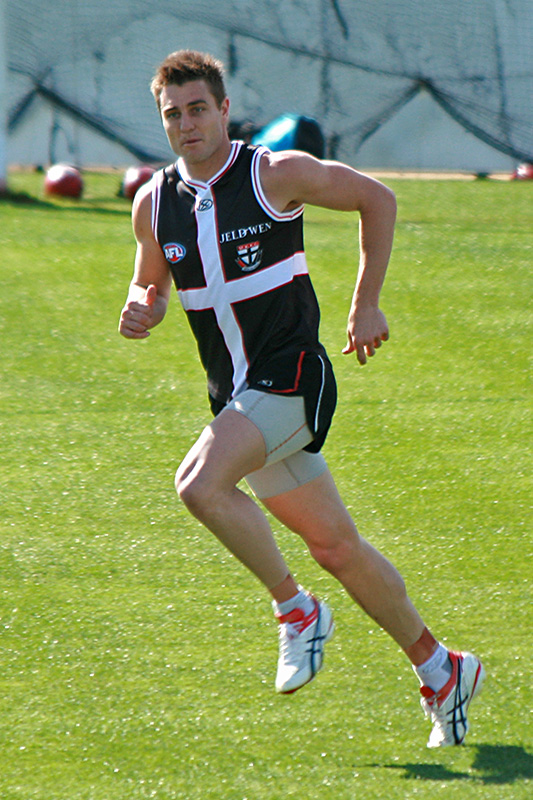
- Fisher training at Moorabbin Oval, 2009

Personal information
- Full name: Samuel Fisher
- Born: 10 July 1982 (age 44)
- Original team: West Adelaide (SANFL)
- Draft: No. 55, 2003 national draft
- Height: 191 cm (6 ft 3 in)
- Weight: 92 kg (203 lb)
- Position: Defender

Playing career^{1}
Years	Club	Games (Goals)
2004–2016	St Kilda	228 (22)

International team honours^{2}
Years	Team	Games (Goals)
2006	Australia	2 (0)
- ^{1} Playing statistics correct to the end of 2016.^{2} Representative statistics correct as of 2006.

Career highlights
- Trevor Barker Award 2008, 2011; All-Australian Team 2008

Samuel Fisher (born 10 July 1982) is a former professional Australian rules footballer who played for the St Kilda Football Club in the Australian Football League (AFL). In May 2024, Fisher was sentenced to a maximum of more than five years' imprisonment after being convicted of drug trafficking.

== Early life ==
Between the ages of 17 and 19, Fisher was a promising junior golfer and played off a handicap of 1. He won the Riverland Tyre and Mag Boxing Day Classic four times, twice with his father Terry and twice with his brother Ben. However, Fisher gave away a possible career in golf for AFL football.

Fisher began playing Australian rules in South Australia with West Adelaide, where he was first identified by AFL scouts at the age of 21.

== AFL career ==
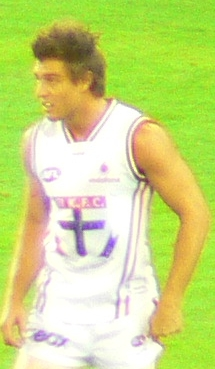
Fisher playing for St Kilda during the 2007 AFL Season

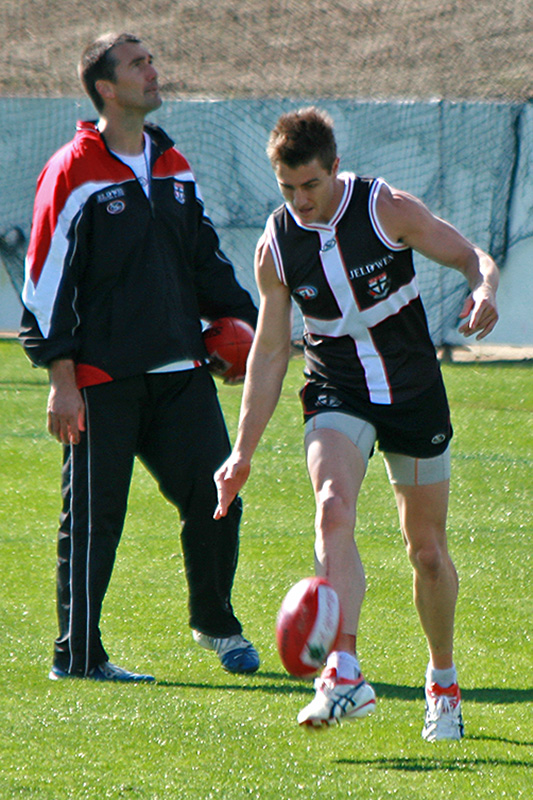
Fisher at training prior to the 2009 AFL Grand Final under the eye of assistant coach Stephen Silvagni

=== Draft and debut ===
The versatile defender was selected as pick number 55 in the 2003 AFL draft.

Fisher made his debut in Round 7, 2004, after injuries to other key defenders meant he was required for the team. St Kilda was in a strong position when he made his debut, having won the pre-season Wizard Home Loans Cup, and they were undefeated in first position in the pre-season premiership. The Saints had strung together 10 consecutive wins when including the pre-season tournament. St Kilda defeated Fremantle in Perth by 23 points. He didn't play again until Round 15, and he played six matches in a row through to Round 20. It provided more stability to the team after a difficult run of matches, and St Kilda eventually made it to the top 4 for the 2004 Finals series. Fisher did not play another match for the season after Round 20, watching on as the Saints played in the Qualifying Final, Semi-Final, and Preliminary Final in the first 3 weeks of the Finals series.

=== First finals match ===
In 2005, Fisher took a major step in his career and improved dramatically to hold down a regular spot in the Saints' defence, playing 21 matches. He generally played on the third-best forward of the opposition and began to provide prolific running from the half-back line. Despite some obvious difficulties during the year, the Saints qualified for the finals in 4th position. Fisher was part of the team that defeated the Minor Premiers Adelaide in the 1st Qualifying Final in Adelaide. He racked up 22 disposals in the match, which secured St Kilda a home Preliminary Final, in one of the best Finals wins this century by any team. It was Fisher's first Finals match with St Kilda, and it set a standard he met consistently throughout his career, but this was his final game for the year.

In 2006, he played every match and had 421 disposals for the season. His 20-disposal-per game run-and-carry play from the half-back line in his 23 matches was critical to St Kilda's run to the finals, which resulted in an ultimately unfulfilling and underwhelming 6th-place finish. He was rewarded for his efforts with a podium third-placed finish in the St Kilda Best and Fairest Trevor Barker Award.

Injuries to other key defenders at the start of the 2007 season saw Fisher assume the role of full-back and key defender. He performed strongly against the power forwards of the competition before injuring his hamstring in Round 4. He returned in Round 7 and was able to resume his attacking position across half-back in the second half of the year. Fisher achieved his first 30-disposal game in 2007, having over 30 disposals 4 times during the season. His intercept marking in the back-line became a feature of his game, and he racked up 8 matches where he finished with more than 10 marks, with 186 for the year at just over 9 per game. He finished off the year strongly, and he was nominated in the backline in the squad of 40 players for the All-Australian Team. Fisher was ranked 8th in total marks, 17th in kicks per game, and 2nd in marks per game, in a season where St Kilda did not get to compete in the Finals. He was again a podium finisher in the Best and Fairest Trevor Barker Award, finishing second. Fisher signed a two-year contract extension in September 2007 until the end of 2010.

=== Best & Fairest, All-Australian ===
Fisher was required to play as a key-position backman after a season-ending injury to teammate Matt Maguire early in the 2008 season. He played in St Kilda's 2008 National Australia Band Cup winning team, the club's first pre-season cup win since 2004. Fisher had a strong season, averaging 22 disposals and 8 marks a game at the end of a regular season where St Kilda made a late charge to the finals, securing a top-4 qualification with a win in the final round. Fisher was included in the All-Australian team on the half-back flank, the first time he had been awarded that honour. Fisher also won the Saints' Trevor Barker Award for the 2008 season. He polled 680 votes to finish ahead of Nick Riewoldt, who polled 643 votes. He marked the ball more than 10 times in 11 of his 25 matches, playing in all 3 of St Kilda's Finals matches for the season, where the Saints season ended in the Preliminary Final.

=== Consecutive grand finals ===
Fisher was again a consistent interceptor and prolific running presence in St Kilda's club all-time best home-and-away season of 2009, being pivotal in the Saints defence. Playing as a key back-man, regularly at centre half-back, he was used as a primary rebound player. He averaged 23 disposals and 8 marks per game for the season, playing in 21 of the 22 matches in the 2009 home-and-away rounds, in which St Kilda qualified in first position for the finals series, winning the 2009 Minor Premiership McClelland Trophy. Fisher was one of the dominant players of the 2009 Finals series, beginning the finals with a game high 42 disposals and 16 marks in the impressive 1st Qualifying Final win against Collingwood. He then played a crucial role in St Kilda's triumphant but unforgivably gruelling Preliminary Final win two weeks later. Fisher collected 30 disposals and kicked a pivotal set shot goal from outside 50 in the Saints' tough win over the Western Bulldogs, which was only assured beyond doubt with a late goal to Nick Riewoldt in the final minutes of the game. The win meant St Kilda got to play in its first Grand Final since the 1997 team. Fisher was targeted and closely checked in the 2009 Grand Final, finishing with 15 disposals and 12 "one-percenters".

Fisher missed the first two rounds of 2010, returning for a win that set the tone for the season against Collingwood in Round 3. He was taken from the ground on a stretcher, tested under concussion protocols, then returned to finish out a match that St Kilda won by 28 points. Despite the nasty head clash and time on the bench, he finished with 28 disposals and 10 marks. Fisher played in all of the remaining 20 regular season games in 2010 after Round 2. He was again a consistent standout during the finals series, averaging 24 disposals and 8 marks in St Kilda unbeaten Finals series run to the end of the 2010 AFL Grand Final. As of the end of the 2010 season, Fisher had played in Finals matches in five of the most recent six Finals series, with three of those seasons resulting in a preliminary final, while two were consecutive grand finals.

=== Second Best & Fairest award ===
In 2011, Fisher was a stabilising force in defence during a difficult start to the season for St Kilda. At the end of eight rounds, the Saints were listed as an underwhelming 15th on the AFL ladder. Fisher played all 23 matches for the season, consistently averaging 21 disposals and 6.5 marks a game. Fisher was a consistent running option for St Kilda during a season where the team re-built its season admirably, winning 8 of its last 10 home-and-away matches (11 of its last 15), to qualify for a home elimination final. Fisher's consistency, work ethic and stability in defence was rewarded with a second Trevor Barker Award.

=== 2012–2016 ===
Fisher's remaining seasons at St Kilda were adversely affected due to unavailability through injury. He played 61 matches in total in his last 5 seasons, his two most productive seasons being 15 matches in 2012 and 18 matches in 2015. At the conclusion of the 2016 season, Fisher announced his retirement from the St Kilda Football Club, having played 228 games for St Kilda, after being a mature-age recruit in his early 20s.

== Personal life and criminal conviction ==
Sam Fisher
- Status: Incarcerated
- Convictions: 2024
- Criminal charge: Drug trafficking
- Penalty: Minimum: 3 years in prison; Maximum: 5 years and 4 months in prison

In May 2022, Fisher was charged with regularly trafficking large quantities of illicit drugs across state borders. After not appearing at the Melbourne Magistrates' Court, he opted to stay in custody, with the matter adjourned until 10 August 2022. Nick Riewoldt, St Kilda's former captain, said that the AFL and its players association needed to do more to help players when their playing careers ended. He also acknowledged that Fisher was "having some issues" in his playing days. According to sports journalist Mark Robinson, Fisher's plea for help came back in 2012 at a time when a source told News Corp that the club "feared" the defender's lifestyle issues.

Fisher's drug dependency continued to spiral, and he ended up getting entangled in an interstate trafficking scheme. In May 2024, Fisher was sentenced to five years' imprisonment after being convicted of drug trafficking. He pled guilty to six drug offences, including trafficking a commercial quantity of methamphetamine, cocaine, and 1,4-Butanediol, and three counts of drug possession.

== Statistics ==
Legend
G	Goals	K	Kicks	D	Disposals	T	Tackles
B	Behinds	H	Handballs	M	Marks

Season	Team	No.	Games	Totals							Averages (per game)						
Season	Team	No.	Games	G	B	K	H	D	M	T	G	B	K	H	D	M	T
2004	St Kilda	25	7	0	2	49	17	66	25	6	0.0	0.3	7.0	2.4	9.4	3.6	0.9
2005^{#}	St Kilda	25	21	2	0	189	103	292	91	19	0.1	0.0	9.0	4.9	13.9	4.3	0.9
2006	St Kilda	25	23	2	2	310	162	472	158	30	0.1	0.1	13.5	7.0	20.5	6.9	1.3
2007	St Kilda	25	20	0	2	296	110	406	186	23	0.0	0.1	14.8	5.5	20.3	9.3	1.2
2008^	St Kilda	25	25	5	2	359	217	576	228	39	0.2	0.1	14.4	8.7	23.0	9.1	1.6
2009	St Kilda	25	24	4	2	323	228	551	184	36	0.2	0.1	13.5	9.5	23.0	7.7	1.5
2010	St Kilda	25	24	5	6	305	209	514	188	43	0.2	0.3	12.7	8.7	21.4	7.8	1.8
2011	St Kilda	25	23	2	4	292	194	486	153	56	0.1	0.2	12.7	8.4	21.1	6.7	2.4
2012	St Kilda	25	15	1	1	178	87	265	95	28	0.1	0.1	11.9	5.8	17.7	6.3	1.9
2013	St Kilda	25	9	0	0	98	63	161	56	14	0.0	0.0	10.9	7.0	17.9	6.2	1.6
2014	St Kilda	25	7	1	0	84	42	126	50	19	0.1	0.0	12.0	6.0	18.0	7.1	2.7
2015	St Kilda	25	18	0	0	208	102	310	120	32	0.0	0.0	11.6	5.7	17.2	6.7	1.8
2016	St Kilda	25	12	0	2	108	63	171	64	21	0.0	0.2	9.0	5.3	14.3	5.3	1.8
Career			228	22	23	2799	1597	4396	1598	366	0.1	0.1	12.3	7.0	19.3	7.0	1.6
Finals			12	3	1	209	94	303	107	23	0.25	0.1	17.4	7.8	25.3	8.9	1.9
