= 2009 AFL Grand Final =

Grand final of the 2009 Australian Football League season

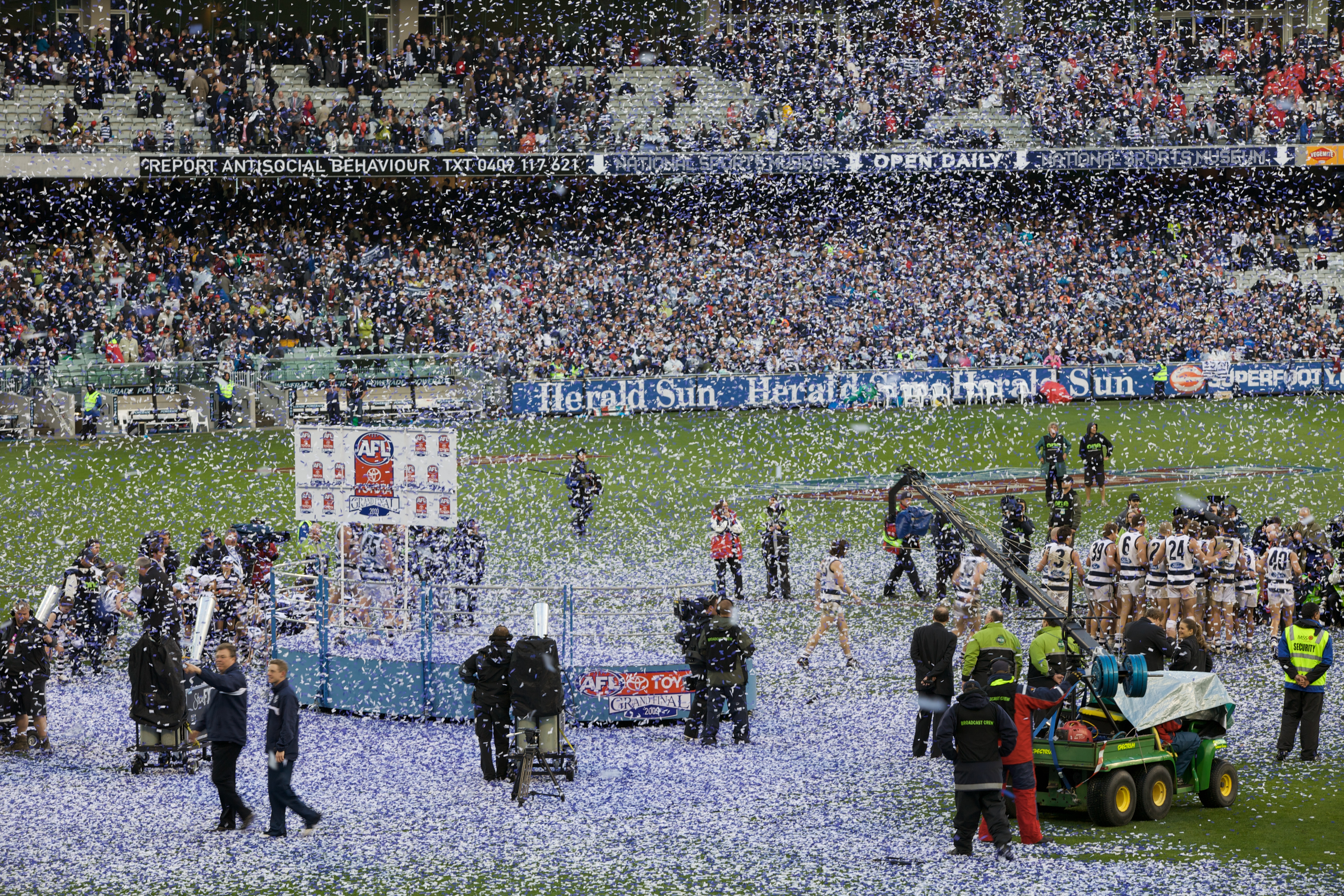
- Post-match presentation after the grand final

St Kilda	Geelong
9.14 (68)	12.8 (80)
	1	2	3	4
STK	3.2 (20)	7.7 (49)	9.11 (65)	9.14 (68)
GEE	3.0 (18)	7.1 (43)	9.4 (58)	12.8 (80)
- Date: 26 September 2009, 2.30pm
- Stadium: Melbourne Cricket Ground
- Attendance: 99,251
- Favourite: Geelong
- Umpires: Stephen McBurney, Brett Rosebury, Shaun Ryan
- Coin toss won by: Geelong
- Kicked toward: City End

Ceremonies
- Pre-match entertainment: Mark Seymour, Jimmy Barnes, John Farnham and Qantas choir
- National anthem: Jersey Boys

Accolades
- Norm Smith Medallist: Paul Chapman (Geelong)
- Jock McHale Medallist: Mark Thompson (Geelong)

Broadcast in Australia
- Network: Network Ten
- Commentators: Stephen Quartermain (Host); Tim Lane (Commentator); Robert Walls (Expert Commentator); Luke Darcy (Expert Commentator); Mark Howard (Boundary Rider); Andrew Maher (Boundary Rider)

The 2009 AFL Grand Final was an Australian rules football game contested between the St Kilda Football Club and the Geelong Football Club at the Melbourne Cricket Ground on 26 September 2009. It was the 113th annual grand final of the Australian Football League (formerly the Victorian Football League), staged to determine the premiers for the 2009 AFL season.

The match, attended by 99,251 spectators, was won by Geelong by a margin of 12 points, marking the club's eighth VFL/AFL premiership victory. It is remembered as one of the great grand finals in recent memory, due to the closeness of the scoreline, the physical nature of the game and the sheer brilliance of individual efforts from some of its participants. Geelong's Paul Chapman was awarded the Norm Smith Medal as the best player on the ground.

== Background ==
Geelong entered the 2009 season after two consecutive minor premierships and two consecutive grand final appearances: a victory in 2007 and a loss in 2008. The dominant club over the previous two years, the club at one point went on a run of 55 wins from 58 games. Geelong had perfected a novel style of high-possession football, studded with star midfielders adept at running, carrying and executing chains of handpasses through the corridor of the ground, and it was consistently setting new league records for its high disposal counts. It was also routinely recording more handpasses than kicks; no team had ever previously done this successfully – having fewer kicks than handpasses was previously seen as a statistical marker of a struggling team – but Geelong had adapted the novel style into an attacking weapon which had made it into the league's highest scoring team. In the 2009 season, Geelong won its first 13 games, but endured a late season slump – with a 5–4 record and only two wins by greater than a goal – to finish second with an 18–4 record. Geelong defeated a fast-finishing Western Bulldogs team by 14 points in their qualifying final and then comfortably beat Collingwood by 73 points in their preliminary final to advance to the grand final.

St Kilda entered the 2009 premiership season after having lost its preliminary final in 2008 against eventual premiers Hawthorn. The Saints' home-and-away season was the best in its history, winning the first 19 games to record the longest winning streak in the club's history, before losing consecutive late season games to finished on top of the ladder with a 20–2 record and the McClelland Trophy for the first time since 1997. Its success was built on full team defense, unrelenting tackle pressure at the ball-carrier and contested ball, a style which Lyon had designed primarily to counter Geelong's high-possession game. St Kilda's 2009 team was arguably the best defensive team of the modern era; it conceded only 64 points per game in the home-and-away season which, as of 2022, remains the lowest by any team in a conventional season since 1966.^{N 1} They accounted for Collingwood by 28 points in their qualifying final and won a hard-fought and low scoring preliminary final against the Western Bulldogs by seven points to earn their place in the grand final.

The two sides had faced each other once during the year in a famous Round 14 match which is considered one of the best home-and-away matches in history. Both sides entered the match undefeated with 13–0 records, and a record Etihad Stadium crowd saw St Kilda win the match by six points, with Michael Gardiner kicking the winning goal in the dying minutes.

This grand final appearance was the sixteenth in Geelong's history and its third in succession. It was sixth grand final appearance in St Kilda's history and the first since the 1997 Grand Final, with the club attempting to win its second premiership. Geelong and St Kilda had never previously met each other in a grand final. Despite their respective ladder positions, Geelong entered the grand final as $1.60 favourites to win amongst most bookmakers. In the week leading up to the grand final, Geelong's Gary Ablett was awarded the Brownlow Medal.

It was the first grand final to be played since the death of cartoonist William Ellis Green (better known as WEG), who had been drawing victory posters after VFL/AFL grand finals since 1954. The posters had been sold after each Grand Final with the proceeds going to the Royal Children's Hospital. Beginning in 2009, the posters were drawn by cartoonist Mark Knight of the Herald Sun.

== Media coverage ==
Coverage telecast live and in HD (via One HD) on Channel Ten and One HD with commentators Stephen Quartermain (host), Tim Lane (commentator), Robert Walls (expert commentator), Luke Darcy (expert commentator), Mark Howard (boundary rider) and Andrew Maher (boundary rider). Geelong's K-Rock provided local coverage with commentary from Anthony Mithen and Ian Cohen.

== Pre-match entertainment ==
Mark Seymour from Australian rock band Hunters and Collectors performed "Holy Grail" on stage, followed by Jimmy Barnes singing "No Second Prize". John Farnham then sang "You're the Voice", joined later by Seymour and Barnes. The premiership cup was brought onto the field twice: once by captains and administrators from football clubs affected by the 2009 Victorian bushfires, and then later via zip-line by Adelaide Crows champion Mark Ricciuto. The Qantas choir performed "I Still Call Australia Home", and the national anthem was performed a cappella by the cast of Jersey Boys.

== Match summary ==
The grand final was played in cold and wet conditions. It had rained heavily the previous night in Melbourne such that the ground was particularly wet around the boundary, and there were also several heavy showers during the game. The highest ambient temperature for the game was only 11.3 °C, the coldest on record for a grand final.

=== First quarter ===
Geelong started strongly, with Max Rooke scoring the opening goal of the game in the 3rd minute after winning a holding the ball at centre half-forward against St Kilda's Raphael Clarke, and Cameron Mooney scoring another in the 8th minute. From that point forward, St Kilda dominated the middle part of the quarter, asserting an advantage in the midfield, particularly through the influence of Lenny Hayes who tallied 11 disposals for the quarter. St Kilda failed to convert on the scoreboard due to inaccurate kicking: despite entering the forward 50-metres arc on 14 occasions to Geelong's two during a sustained period of midfield dominance, they only registered 2.2 (14), with goals to Brendon Goddard in the 13th minute and Hayes in the 20th minute; while Geelong was able to counterattack with one goal to Joel Selwood in the 18th minute. Andrew McQualter, Adam Schneider and Stephen Milne all missing easy shots at goal; but, in the 29th minute, Schneider marked and goaled from 15 meters out to give St Kilda a two-point lead at quarter time.

=== Second quarter ===
St Kilda opened the second quarter better, and Sean Dempster kicked the first goal of the quarter from a high tackle free kick in the 4th minute; but again the Saints missed several relatively easy shots at goal from Schneider, Milne and McQualter, and after twelve minutes of strong play led by only ten points.

Geelong then responded with the next four goals of the game in a fifteen-minute period of play. Shannon Byrnes gathered a tumbling Cameron Ling kick in the goal square for Geelong's fourth goal in the 13th minute; and a goal to Gary Ablett, Jr. from a marking infringement free kick in the 20th minute gave Geelong back the lead. The game's most controversial goal came in the 24th minute with scores level: St Kilda full back Zac Dawson's attempted clearing kick was smothered in the goal square by Geelong's Tom Hawkins, who gathered and immediately snapped for goal from five metres out; the ball clipped the inside of the right goal post, but no umpire was in a position to see it and a goal was awarded (video score reviews were not introduced to the league until 2012). Fifteen seconds of game time later, a clean centre clearance finished with a goal to Paul Chapman, and a 12-point lead to Geelong.

However, St Kilda finished the quarter with a flurry of goals, kicking three inside the final minute of playing time. With 53 seconds remaining, Clinton Jones roved a pack to snap a goal from the pocket. With nine seconds remaining, Justin Koschitzke got his boot to a broken marking contest in the goal square, just eluding the diving hands of Darren Milburn's attempted smother, to tie the scores. Then Milburn, believing (incorrectly, according to replays) that he had touched Koschitzke's kick off the boot, made an obscene gesture to goal umpire, giving away a free kick for demonstrative abuse on the goal line; Schneider took the free kick and kicked the games second controversial goal to give St Kilda a six-point half-time lead.

=== Third quarter ===
The third quarter was an even and lower-scoring contest. There were many stoppages, much congestion and very little opportunity for scoring by either side. Geelong's Mooney goaled in the eighth minute the quarter from a solid contested mark at the top of the goal square, and Saints' captain Nick Riewoldt did likewise in the tenth minute. Riewoldt had two more scoring chances soon after, kicking a behind in the 14th minute, and having a short range shot smothered for a rushed behind by Harry Taylor in the 15th minute.

After a goal to Chapman in the 18th minute, the scores were tied at 58 apiece, and remained tied for more than ten minutes. The deadlock was broken by the Saints' Leigh Montagna, who goaled with 90 seconds left in the quarter from a Steven King hit-out from a boundary throw-in in the Saints' forward pocket. With one more behind before the end of the quarter, St Kilda entered the three quarter time break with a seven-point lead.

=== Fourth quarter ===
Geelong scored a goal from a Hawkins set shot in the second minute of the final quarter to bring the margin back to a single point. The 21 minutes that followed were a tough battle which yielded only five behinds: the first two to St Kilda, and the next three to Geelong, tying the scores at 67 apiece.

In the 24th minute, with less than five minutes of play remaining, Geelong's Steve Johnson had the ball in defence and kicked the ball towards Ablett, who had found space in the centre circle. St Kilda's Zac Dawson had left his opponent Cameron Mooney and run a considerable distance from his own defence and managed to spoil the kick. With two St Kilda players in the area, the ball fell to Geelong's Matthew Scarlett, who had also run a long way from his own defensive area. Scarlett, with his right foot, gently kicked the ball five metres out of midair to Ablett, who was now in space—a moment which has become known as the toe-poke. Ablett then kicked the ball long to Geelong's goal square, where several players contested for the ball. After receiving the ball from teammate Shannon Byrnes, Geelong forward Travis Varcoe managed to handball to Chapman, who kicked a left-foot goal past St Kilda's Jason Blake's outstretched hands. Had Dawson's spoil not gone directly to Scarlett, St Kilda had the numbers advantage at the fall of the ball and would likely have been able to go forward into attack themselves. After the game, Matthew Scarlett stated that his toe poke was a lucky kick.

A subsequent behind to Rooke in the 27th minute put the Cats seven points ahead. In the 29th minute, Stephen Milne took a long kick into a largely open forward line towards the unguarded goals for St Kilda, but it was a tumbling kick and Scarlett was able to comfortably rush it through for a behind. Kicking in from the behind, the Cats went to a contest 50m from goal where a strong mark was taken by Harry Taylor. From there, the Cats were in the process of moving the ball forward when the final siren sounded. An after-the-siren goal from Rooke extended the margin to twelve points, and St Kilda was held goalless during the final quarter.

=== Norm Smith Medal ===
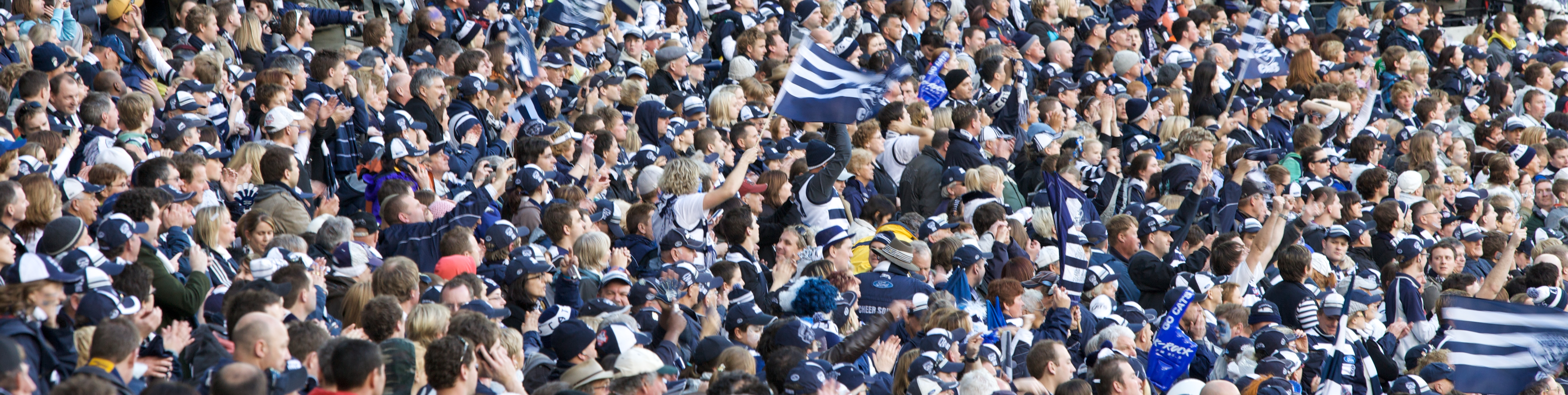
Geelong supporters at the 2009 AFL Grand Final

Norm Smith Medal voting tally
Position	Player	Club	Total votes	Vote summary
1st (winner)	Paul Chapman	Geelong	9	3,3,3
2nd	Jason Gram	St Kilda	9	3,2,2,1,1
3rd	Harry Taylor	Geelong	3	3
4th – tied	Gary Ablett Jr.	Geelong	2	1,1
4th – tied	Jimmy Bartel	Geelong	2	2
4th – tied	Darren Milburn	Geelong	2	2
4th – tied	Max Rooke	Geelong	2	2
8th	Joel Corey	Geelong	1	1

Paul Chapman was awarded the Norm Smith Medal for his three goals and 26 possessions, including nine possessions and the go-ahead goal in the final quarter despite sustaining a slight hamstring injury in the first quarter. Chapman received 9 of a possible 15 votes to win the medal. St Kilda's Jason Gram, who had 30 disposals, finished second for the medal; he also polled nine votes but lost to Chapman on a countback, as Chapman received three votes from three of the five judges, while Gram received three votes from only one judge. Geelong's Harry Taylor was third, receiving a single set of three votes for his job shutting down St Kilda's Nick Riewoldt. Geelong's Max Rooke, Gary Ablett, Jr., Jimmy Bartel, Darren Milburn and Joel Corey also polled votes.

Chaired by John Worsfold, the voters and their choices were as follows:

Voter	Role	3 votes	2 votes	1 vote
John Worsfold	West Coast Eagles Coach	Paul Chapman	Jason Gram	Joel Corey
Nathan Buckley	Former AFL Player	Paul Chapman	Darren Milburn	Jason Gram
Jason Dunstall	Triple M	Paul Chapman	Jason Gram	Gary Ablett Jr.
Gerard Healy	3AW	Jason Gram	Jimmy Bartel	Gary Ablett Jr.
Gerard Whateley	ABC	Harry Taylor	Max Rooke	Jason Gram

=== General summary ===
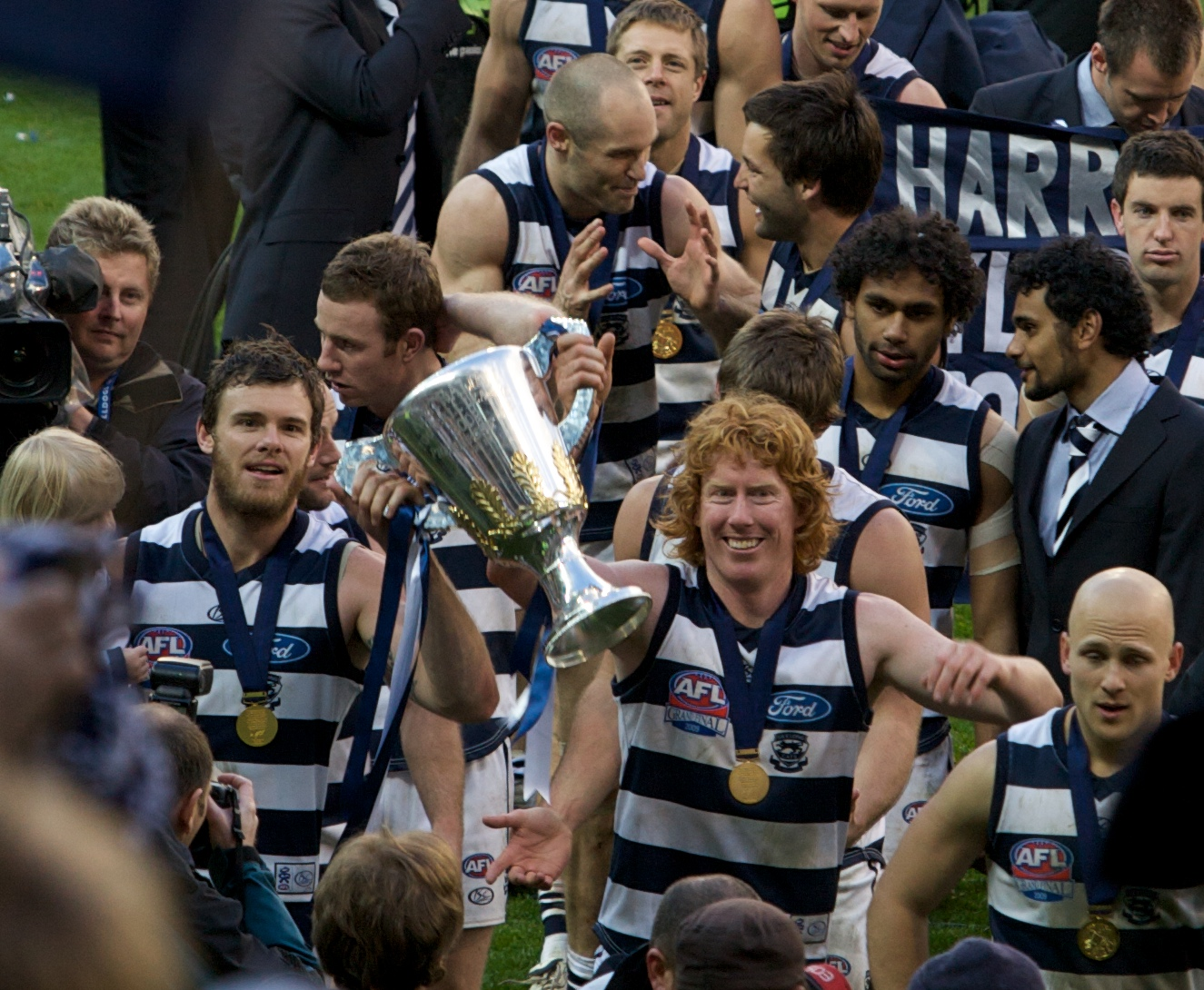
Cameron Mooney and vice-captain Cameron Ling holding the 2009 premiership cup aloft

Chapman, Rooke, Milburn, Ablett, Bartel and Taylor were all excellent for Geelong. Taylor, in particular, was lauded for restricting dangerous Saints forward Riewoldt to just one goal. Contributing strongly for the Saints were Hayes, Gram, Luke Ball, Jones, Montagna, Steven Baker and Brendon Goddard; Goddard continued playing with a broken nose and a fractured collarbone, sustained in separate incidents during the game.

There was a very high number of tackles laid during the game—partly due to the high pressure of the teams, and also exacerbated by the wet conditions are always conducive to high tackle counts. St Kilda's 118 tackles set a new record as the highest by any team in any game, the combined total of 214 tackles set a new mark as the second highest on record, and Bartel's 16 tackles matched the equal-highest personal tally on record—these tallies have all since been surpassed.

In general play, St Kilda throughout the first half earned 31 inside-50s to Geelong's 15, and was consistently able to stop Geelong's rebound through the middle. However, they did waste many of their inside-50s by missing relatively easy shots on goal and were unable to defend the fewer entries by Geelong. In the second half, general play was much more even but Geelong had the better of the inside-50s and clearances, and were better able to break through St Kilda's rebound defence. This attribute ultimately accounted for Geelong's triumph.

It was an extremely close game throughout: twelve points was the greatest margin at any stage of the game (held by Geelong early in the first quarter, late in the second quarter, and the final margin).

St Kilda became the first team to lose a grand final from a three-quarter-time lead since Hawthorn in 1984, while Geelong became the first team to win a grand final after losing the first three quarters (albeit losing them only by 2, 1, and 4 points, respectively). Geelong was the first team since Essendon in 2000 to win both the pre-season premiership and the regular season premiership in the same season.

== Scorecard ==
Grand final
Saturday, 26 September (2:30 pm)	St Kilda	def. by	Geelong	MCG (crowd: 99,251)
3.2 (20); 7.7 (49); 9.11 (65); 9.14 (68)	Q1; Q2; Q3; Final	3.0 (18); 7.1 (43); 9.4 (58); 12.8 (80)	Umpires: Stephen McBurney (3), Brett Rosebury (8), Shaun Ryan (25); Norm Smith Medal: Paul Chapman (Geelong); Television broadcast: Network Ten; National anthem: Jersey Boys
Schneider 2, Goddard, Hayes, Dempster, Jones, Koschitzke, Riewoldt, Montagna	Goals	Chapman 3, Mooney 2, Hawkins 2, Rooke 2, Selwood, Byrnes, Ablett
Gram, Hayes, Ball, Jones, Montagna, Baker, Goddard	Best	Chapman, Rooke, Milburn, Taylor, Selwood, Ablett, Corey, Bartel, Ling, Scarlett
Goddard (broken nose/collarbone), Riewoldt (Torn adductor muscle)	Injuries	Paul Chapman (hamstring), Harry Taylor (broken hand)
Nil	Reports	Nil.
Geelong won the toss and chose to kick to the city end.

== Teams ==
St Kilda	Geelong

St Kilda
B:	27 Jason Blake	43 Zac Dawson	10 Steven Baker
HB:	18 Brendon Goddard	25 Sam Fisher	19 Sam Gilbert
C:	22 Farren Ray	7 Lenny Hayes	26 Nick Dal Santo
HF:	32 Andrew McQualter	23 Justin Koschitzke	38 Clinton Jones
F:	44 Stephen Milne	12 Nick Riewoldt (c)	1 Jason Gram
Foll:	2 Steven King	11 Leigh Montagna	13 Adam Schneider
Int:	14 Luke Ball	16 Raphael Clarke	24 Sean Dempster
Int:	15 Michael Gardiner		
Coach:	Ross Lyon		

Geelong
B:	39 Darren Milburn	30 Matthew Scarlett	44 Corey Enright
HB:	4 Andrew Mackie	7 Harry Taylor	2 Tom Harley (c)
C:	11 Joel Corey	45 Cameron Ling	9 James Kelly
HF:	3 Jimmy Bartel	21 Cameron Mooney	5 Travis Varcoe
F:	20 Steve Johnson	26 Tom Hawkins	35 Paul Chapman
Foll:	24 Mark Blake	14 Joel Selwood	29 Gary Ablett
Int:	6 Brad Ottens	17 Shannon Byrnes	33 Max Rooke
Int:	40 David Wojcinski		
Coach:	Mark Thompson		

=== List ===
St Kilda	2009 AFL Grand Final	Geelong
(9.14)	68—80	(12.8)

Position	Player	Poss.	Goals
Forward	Stephen Milne	11	
Forward	Nick Riewoldt	13	1
Forward	Jason Gram	30	
Half-Forward	Andrew McQualter	14	
Half-Forward	Justin Koschitzke	9	1
Half-Forward	Clinton Jones	15	1
Centre	Farren Ray	11	
Centre	Lenny Hayes	24	1
Centre	Nick Dal Santo	17	
Half-Back	Brendon Goddard	21	1
Half-Back	Samuel Fisher	15	
Half-Back	Sam Gilbert	18	
Back	Jason Blake	10	
Back	Zac Dawson	14	
Back	Steven Baker	12	
Follower	Steven King	5	
Follower	Leigh Montagna	23	1
Follower	Adam Schneider	10	2
Interchange	Luke Ball	24	
Interchange	Raphael Clarke	13	
Interchange	Sean Dempster	5	1
Interchange	Michael Gardiner	8	
Coach:	Ross Lyon		

Position	Player	Poss.	Goals
Forward	Steve Johnson	9	
Forward	Tom Hawkins	8	2
Forward	Paul Chapman	26	3
Half-Forward	Jimmy Bartel	19	
Half-Forward	Cameron Mooney	10	2
Half-Forward	Travis Varcoe	13	
Centre	Joel Corey	29	
Centre	Cameron Ling	16	
Centre	James Kelly	18	
Half-Back	Andrew Mackie	15	
Half-Back	Harry Taylor	14	
Half-Back	Tom Harley	5	
Back	Darren Milburn	25	
Back	Matthew Scarlett	15	
Back	Corey Enright	22	
Follower	Mark Blake	9	
Follower	Joel Selwood	24	1
Follower	Gary Ablett	25	1
Interchange	Brad Ottens	12	
Interchange	Shannon Byrnes	16	1
Interchange	Max Rooke	11	2
Interchange	David Wojcinski	13	
Coach:	Mark Thompson		

== Footnotes ==
1. The 2020 AFL season, which did see several averages lower than 64 points-per-game, is excluded owing to its matches being played at 80% length due to the COVID-19 pandemic.

== See also ==
- 2009 AFL finals series
- 2009 AFL season
