= Farren Ray =

Australian rules footballer

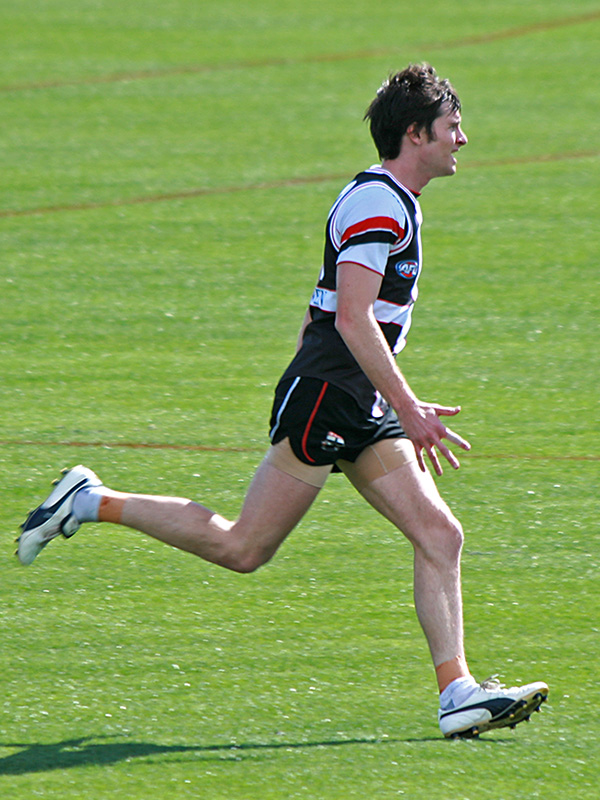

Personal information
- Full name: Farren Ray
- Born: 23 March 1986 (age 40)
- Original team: Peel Thunder (WAFL)
- Draft: No. 4, 2003 National Draft, Western Bulldogs
- Height: 187 cm (6 ft 2 in)
- Weight: 83 kg (183 lb)
- Position: Midfielder

Playing career^{1}
Years	Club	Games (Goals)
2004–2008	Western Bulldogs	75 (32)
2009–2015	St Kilda	123 (26)
2016	North Melbourne	4 (1)
Total		209 (59)
- ^{1} Playing statistics correct to the end of 2016.

Farren Ray (born 23 March 1986) is a former professional Australian rules footballer who played for the Western Bulldogs, St Kilda Football Club and North Melbourne Football Club in the Australian Football League (AFL).

== Playing career ==
=== Career with Western Bulldogs (2004–2008) ===
Ray was recruited from Peel Thunder with the fourth pick in the 2003 AFL draft. He debuted in 2004, playing seven games. He then played 14 games in the 2005 season followed by 21 in the 2006 season. At the end of 2006 he played his first two finals matches, in the first he gathered his highest possession count for the season with 27 touches.

Ray left the Western Bulldogs at the end of the 2008 season to look for opportunities elsewhere. He feared there could be limited opportunities at the club and was disappointed to be dropped after the qualifying final loss to Hawthorn. He has said that he had to move to give himself the opportunity to become a regular senior footballer. There were question marks on his decision making and willingness to strongly contest the ball. During the 2008 trade week he was traded along with the Round 3 draft pick, number 48 overall, to St Kilda for their Round 2 pick, number 31 overall.

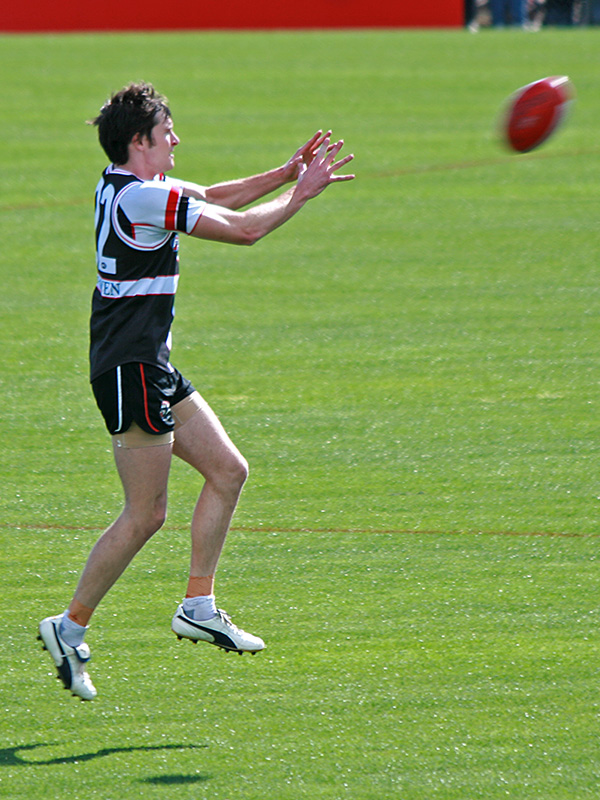
Ray at training prior to the 2009 AFL Grand Final

=== St Kilda (2009–2015) ===
After a trade to the Saints which involved the swapping of selection 31 (Jordan Roughead) for selection 48 (Nicholas Heyne), most expected Ray to be a fringe player who could add some handy depth to the side. But he exceeded all expectations, playing in all of the Saints' 22 home and away games plus all finals in his first season at the club. He was only one of two players at the Saints to do so, the other being defender Jason Blake.

Ray was a valuable contributor for the Saints throughout 2009. His first match against his previous club was successful, gaining 31 disposals and 11 marks and probably only shaded for best on ground honours by teammate Brendon Goddard in the Saints' 28 point win.

Ray played in 22 of 22 matches in the 2009 home and away rounds in which St Kilda qualified in first position for the finals series, winning the club’s third minor premiership.

St Kilda qualified for the 2009 AFL Grand Final after qualifying and preliminary finals wins. Ray played in the grand final in which St Kilda were defeated by 12 points.

Ray played 25 games in 2010, including four finals matches. As of the end of the 2010 season, he had played in 10 finals series matches including three grand finals.

On 26 May 2012, Ray and teammate Lenny Hayes played their 150th and 250th AFL games respectively.

Ray was delisted in October 2015, however St Kilda stated that he might be redrafted in the 2016 rookie draft if available.

=== North Melbourne (2016) ===
Ray was recruited by North Melbourne in the 2016 rookie draft. He retired at the end of the 2016 season after just four games with North Melbourne.
