= Michael Gardiner =

Australian rules footballer (born 1979)

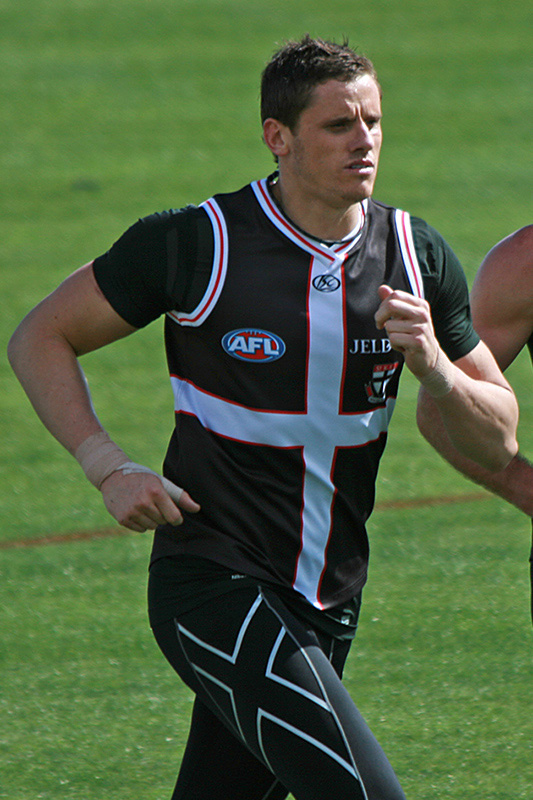

Personal information
- Full name: Michael Strickland Gardiner
- Born: 5 July 1979 (age 47); Albany, Western Australia
- Original team: Claremont (WAFL)
- Draft: No. 1, 1996 National Draft (West Coast)
- Height: 199 cm (6 ft 6 in)
- Weight: 105 kg (231 lb)
- Position: Ruckman

Playing career^{1}
Years	Club	Games (Goals)
1997–2006	West Coast	129 (87)
2007–2011	St Kilda	52 (23)
Total		181 (110)
- ^{1} Playing statistics correct to the end of 2011.

Career highlights
- AFL Rising Star nominee: 1997; Ross Glendinning Medal 2003

Michael Strickland Gardiner (born 5 July 1979) is a former Australian rules footballer who played for the St Kilda Football Club and the West Coast Eagles in the Australian Football League (AFL). Originally from Albany, Western Australia.

Gardiner played for the Claremont Football Club in the West Australian Football League (WAFL) before being drafted by West Coast with the number-one pick in the 1996 National Draft. He made his debut for the club in 1997, and over the next seasons replaced Ryan Turnbull as the club's first-choice ruckman. After being named in the All-Australian team in 2003, Gardiner missed most of the 2004 season due to injury. Loss of form and a series of off-field controversies led to him being traded to St Kilda at the end of the 2006 season, having played total of 129 games for West Coast. During his time at St Kilda, Gardiner added another 52 games, including St Kilda's 2009 and 2010 losing grand final teams, before retiring at the end of the 2011 season.

== Junior career ==
Gardiner played for his school, Wesley College in South Perth. He then played junior football in Western Australia for the Royals Football Club, before heading to Perth to play for Claremont Football Club in the WAFL. Gardiner nominated for the 1996 AFL Draft, and was considered a solid chance to be selected in the top 10.

== Professional career ==
=== West Coast Eagles (1997-2006) ===
==== 1996-1997: Number 1 draft pick and debut ====
Gardiner was selected by the West Coast Eagles with the number 1 draft pick in the 1996 AFL draft.

Gardiner debuted in 1997 in Round 4 against Hawthorn, at only 17 years of age. His number 1 draft pick status came with big expectations from his new club to immediately establish himself as an emerging ruckman/forward. He did not disappoint, winning a Rising Star Rookie of the Year nomination in West Coast's Round 19 win over Hawthorn. He played 10 games for the season, including his first Finals Match in the semi-final loss. West Coast led at every break before being defeated by 13 points by North Melbourne, who went on to play St Kilda in the Preliminary Final.

==== 1998-2000: First finals win ====
Gardiner played 14 games in his second season of AFL Football, averaging 10 disposals and 15 hit-outs a game in a season where he appeared in his second Finals Match. His season ended with a defeat in the qualifying final. In 1999, he played in 17 matches, averaging just under 10 disposals and 14 hit-outs per game. Gardiner appeared in both Finals Matches with West Coast, including his first Finals win as a Player in the Qualifying Final win. His season ended with a semi-final loss in week 2.

The 2000 AFL season saw Gardiner play all of the first 14 matches of the season, before being restricted to just 1 more game for the rest of the season. He had his first 20-plus disposals match against Fremantle in Round 6, kicking 3 goals against Melbourne the following week. He also was awarded 3 Brownlow Medal votes for his 21 disposal, 31 hit-out performance in Round 11. He averaged a personal best 19.6 hit-outs per game for the season.

==== 2001-2004: All Australian Team and Best & Fairest award ====
The 2001 through 2003 seasons saw Gardiner steadily improve in the ruck; his average hit-outs per season increased from 18.7 to a career best 25.2 per game over the three seasons. In Round 5, 2003, he was awarded the Ross Glendinning Medal for best afield in West Coast's win over rivals Fremantle. West Coast's 2002 and 2003 seasons ended in defeat in the Elimination Final on both occasions. He was recognised for his improved consistency by being selected in the 2003 All-Australian Team. However, he was then limited by chronic knee injuries, and played 18 games in the next three seasons with the Eagles with Dean Cox becoming the leading ruckman in the AFL competition. Gardiner's 2004 season was limited to only the first 3 matches, with a knee injury ending his season.

==== 2005-2006: return to football, first Grand Final and off-field controversies ====
Gardiner played limited games in 2005, 12 in total for the year. He played more forward time and averaged 6 disposals per game and kicked 16 goals. He played in all of West Coast's Finals matches for the season, including the ultimately inconsequential 2005 AFL Grand Final. Gardiner was much maligned for his limited season, becoming a target for criticism from West Coast supporters.

In May 2005, Gardiner and then West Coast teammate Ben Cousins were criticised for involvement with a group of alleged Perth crime figures. Cousins and Gardiner allegedly received phone calls from the crime figures both before and after incidents at the Metro City nightclub. Police questioned Cousins and Gardiner about the incidents. The Eagles told the pair that they were on their "last warning" and that their off field behaviour would not be tolerated.

Gardiner's alleged off-field lifestyle issues were often seen as detrimental to the West Coast playing group and, in February 2006, in the midst of the Ben Cousins booze bus incident, he was dropped to the Western Australian Football League side Claremont indefinitely on grounds of poor performance and poor off field behaviour.

Gardiner's 2006 season was limited to just 3 games. On 18 July 2006, Gardiner's playing contract was suspended indefinitely and he was fined $5,000 following his involvement in a traffic accident in the Perth suburb of Scarborough. While he escaped the accident with only minor injuries, West Coast Eagles chief executive Trevor Nisbett said that it was highly unlikely the club would renew his contract at the end of the year.

=== St Kilda Football (2007-2011) ===
==== 2006 Trade period ====
With Michael Gardiner's football career in limbo due to his effective sacking by the West Coast Eagles, speculation linked him with a trade to a Victorian-based club, with St Kilda or Carlton touted as the most likely destination for the ruckman.

During the 2006 AFL Trade Period, the Eagles traded the former number 1 AFL Draft Pick to St Kilda Saints with a third round draft picks (No. 59), and in return for receiving a third round draft pick (No. 43). St Kilda decided to take on the task of physically rehabilitate Gardiner from his persistent injury issues.

==== 2007 season ====
Due to his gradual recovery process from obvious injuries and their referral effects, Gardiner was unable to play any competitive AFL football during the 2007 season.

==== 2008 NAB Cup ====
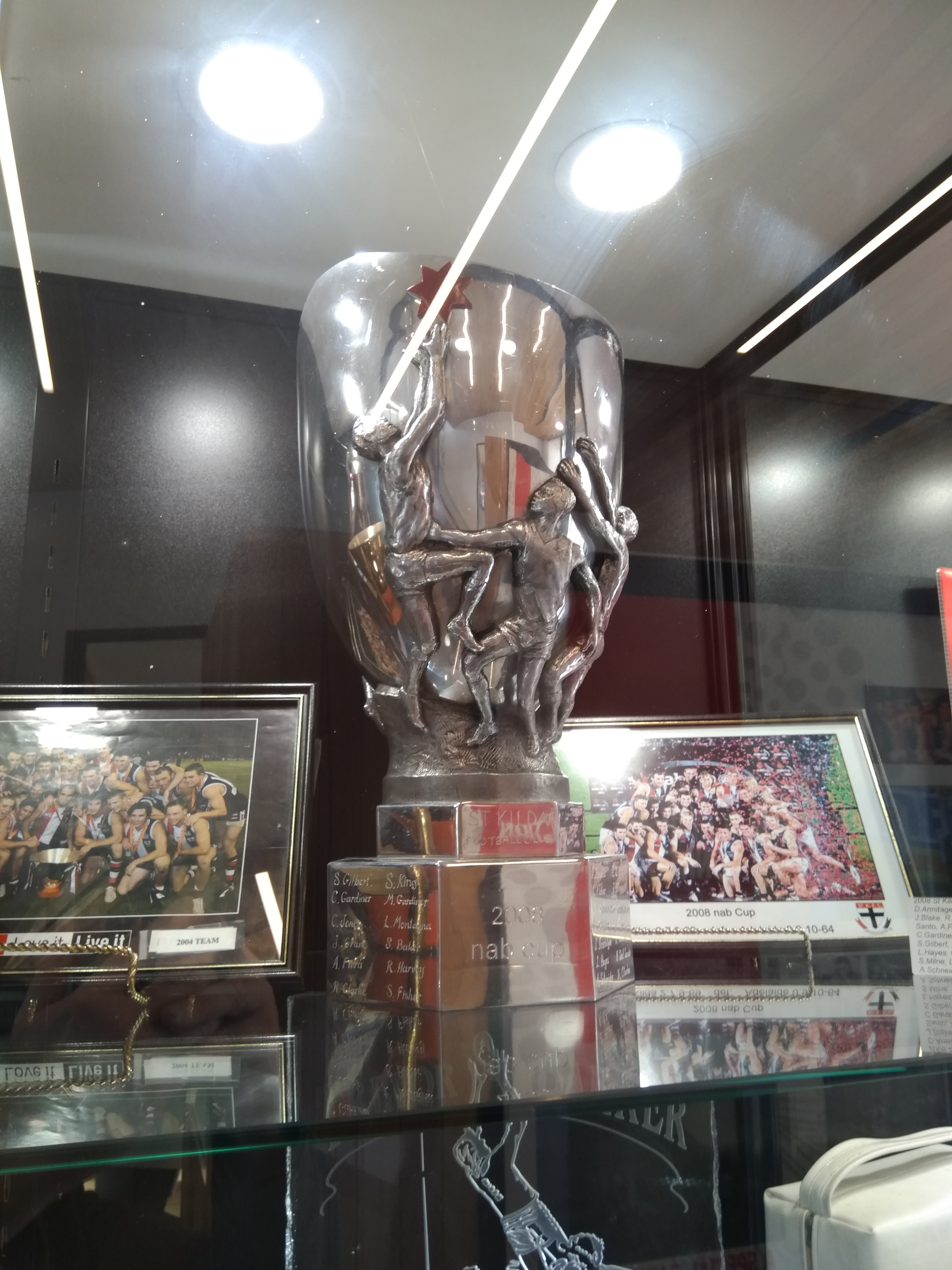
2008 NAB Cup at RSEA Park, Moorabbin

Michael Gardiner started his St Kilda FC playing career by competing in the Saints team that won the 2008 National Australia Bank Cup Premiership. Wins over Richmond, Geelong, Essendon and Adelaide secured the tournament for St Kilda. During the AFL premiership season Gardiner was hampered by injury, only playing 8 games. His attitude and effort in training, combined with the glimpses of form and class he showed in his handful of games, warranted him being retained by St Kilda FC, whose season ended in the Preliminary Final.

==== 2009-2010: Minor Premiership and consecutive grand finals ====
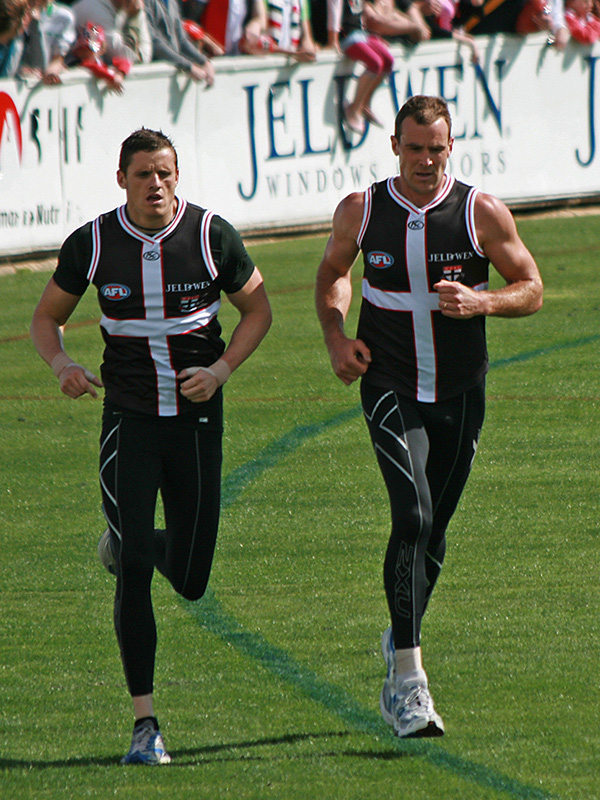
Gardiner (left) running laps with Steven King at training prior to the 2009 AFL Grand Final

The 2009 and 2010 seasons were arguably Gardiner's best football of his career, where he returned to some of his best form, forming a formidable ruck partnership with Steven King. In 2009, Gardiner played in 16 of St Kilda FC's 22 matches in the home and away season, in which St Kilda dominated the competition, qualifying on top of the standings and winning the 2009 AFL Minor Premiership McClelland Trophy. He averaged 10 disposals and 20.5 hit outs per game, while proving a threat up forward, kicking 12 goals for the season. Though considered unfortunate to narrowly miss out on selection, Gardiner's return to form and value to the St Kilda side saw him touted as a potential All-Australian Team selection.

Gardiner played his 150th game of AFL football in the Saints' round 13 match against Richmond, a remarkable milestone for a player who had battled persistent injuries, before being traded by the West Coast Eagles in 2006. Gardiner then played in the Round 14 blockbuster clash between the only two undefeated sides of the competition - the Saints and the Cats. In front of an AFL record crowd of 54,444 at Docklands Stadium, Gardiner kicked four goals, including the last goal of the game after a spectacular mark in the closing 2 minutes. Gardiner would receive 3 Brownlow Medal votes in recognition of his performance as best player on ground against the Cats, which St Kilda won by 6 points. Gardiner played in all of St Kilda's finals matches, including qualifying and Preliminary Final wins over Collingwood and Western Bulldogs, and was selected to play in the 2009 AFL Grand Final, his second Grand Final appearance. Gardiner played just over 50% of game time in the Grand Final where St Kilda was defeated by 12 points by Geelong.

Gardiner had a stellar 2010 season. He played 22 games, the most he had ever played in a single season, during which he averaged 10.5 disposals, 17 hit-outs a game and kicked 10 goals for the year. He combined his aggression and mobility around the ground with masterful ruck performances, recording a top-three finish in the competition for hit-outs to advantage. During the season, Gardiner hit the headlines for a late-night altercation with Carlton Football Club's Mitch Robinson.

However, Gardiner's on-field performances helped the Saints qualify for the Finals Series in third, winning through to a third consecutive Preliminary Final and second consecutive Grand Final with wins over Geelong and the Western Bulldogs in Weeks 1 and 3 of the Finals Series. Gardiner kicked the first goal in St Kilda's hard-fought Qualifying Final victory over Geelong. He was selected to play in his third career Grand Final. During the first half, Gardiner sustained a hamstring strain which effectively ended his season, restricted to the interchange bench for the remainder for the game. His absence being notably covered by Jason Blake in a tightly contested match.

=== 2011: Final game and retirement ===
Hampered by persistent injuries throughout the season, Gardiner was only able to play in one match – the round 24 victory against Carlton which secured finals football for the Saints. During the game, Gardiner proved he had lost none of his ability with a 10 disposal half before being subbed out. The Carlton match would prove to be Gardiner's last AFL game before retiring after the Saints premature exit from the 2011 Finals Series in the Elimination Final the following week. Gardiner played 52 games for the Saints, during which time he returned to being one of the best ruckmen in the league. He was a crucial piece in the St Kilda FC team that dominated the AFL between 2008 and 2010.

== Statistics ==
Legend
G	Goals	K	Kicks	D	Disposals	T	Tackles
B	Behinds	H	Handballs	M	Marks	H/O	Hit-outs

Season	Team	No.	Games	Totals								Averages (per game)							
Season	Team	No.	Games	G	B	K	H	D	M	T	H/O	G	B	K	H	D	M	T	H/O
1997	West Coast	19	10	9	5	69	47	116	54	1	85	0.9	0.5	6.9	4.7	11.6	5.4	0.1	8.5
1998	West Coast	19	15	4	6	75	79	154	64	6	233	0.3	0.4	5.0	5.3	10.3	4.3	0.4	15.5
1999	West Coast	19	17	4	5	99	66	165	69	1	234	0.2	0.3	5.8	3.9	9.7	4.1	0.1	13.8
2000	West Coast	19	13	14	15	144	72	216	78	6	294	0.9	0.9	9.6	4.8	14.4	5.2	0.4	19.6
2001	West Coast	1	20	13	9	188	70	258	122	4	373	0.7	0.5	9.4	3.5	12.9	6.1	0.2	18.7
2002	West Coast	1	16	13	11	177	61	238	119	7	364	0.8	0.7	11.1	3.8	14.9	7.4	0.4	22.8
2003	West Coast	1	18	10	11	179	64	243	113	6	453	0.6	0.6	9.9	3.6	13.5	6.3	0.3	25.2
2004	West Coast	1	3	4	2	17	4	21	14	0	36	1.3	0.7	5.7	1.3	7.0	4.7	0.0	12.0
2005	West Coast	1	12	16	9	65	13	78	47	2	25	1.3	0.8	5.4	1.1	6.5	3.9	0.2	3.9
2006	West Coast	1	3	1	0	19	7	26	14	5	42	0.3	0.0	6.3	2.3	8.7	4.7	1.7	14.0
2008	St Kilda	15	9	1	2	51	31	82	32	4	138	0.1	0.2	5.7	3.4	9.1	3.6	0.4	15.3
2009	St Kilda	15	20	12	6	104	96	200	81	9	410	0.6	0.3	5.2	4.8	10.0	4.1	0.5	20.5
2010	St Kilda	15	22	10	8	134	98	232	91	21	373	0.5	0.4	6.1	4.5	10.5	4.1	1.0	17.0
2011	St Kilda	15	1	0	0	4	6	10	2	1	4	0.0	0.0	4.0	6.0	10.0	2.0	1.0	4.0
Career			181	110	88	1325	714	2039	900	73	3064	0.6	0.5	7.3	3.9	11.3	5.0	0.4	17.0

== Personal life ==
Gardiner married Danielle McCann in late 2009 at a ceremony in South Melbourne, with Ben Cousins serving as his best man. His wife's sister, Haylea McCann, had married Adam Cooney of the Western Bulldogs a week before, making Cooney his brother-in-law.
