= Andrew McQualter =

Australian rules footballer, born 1986

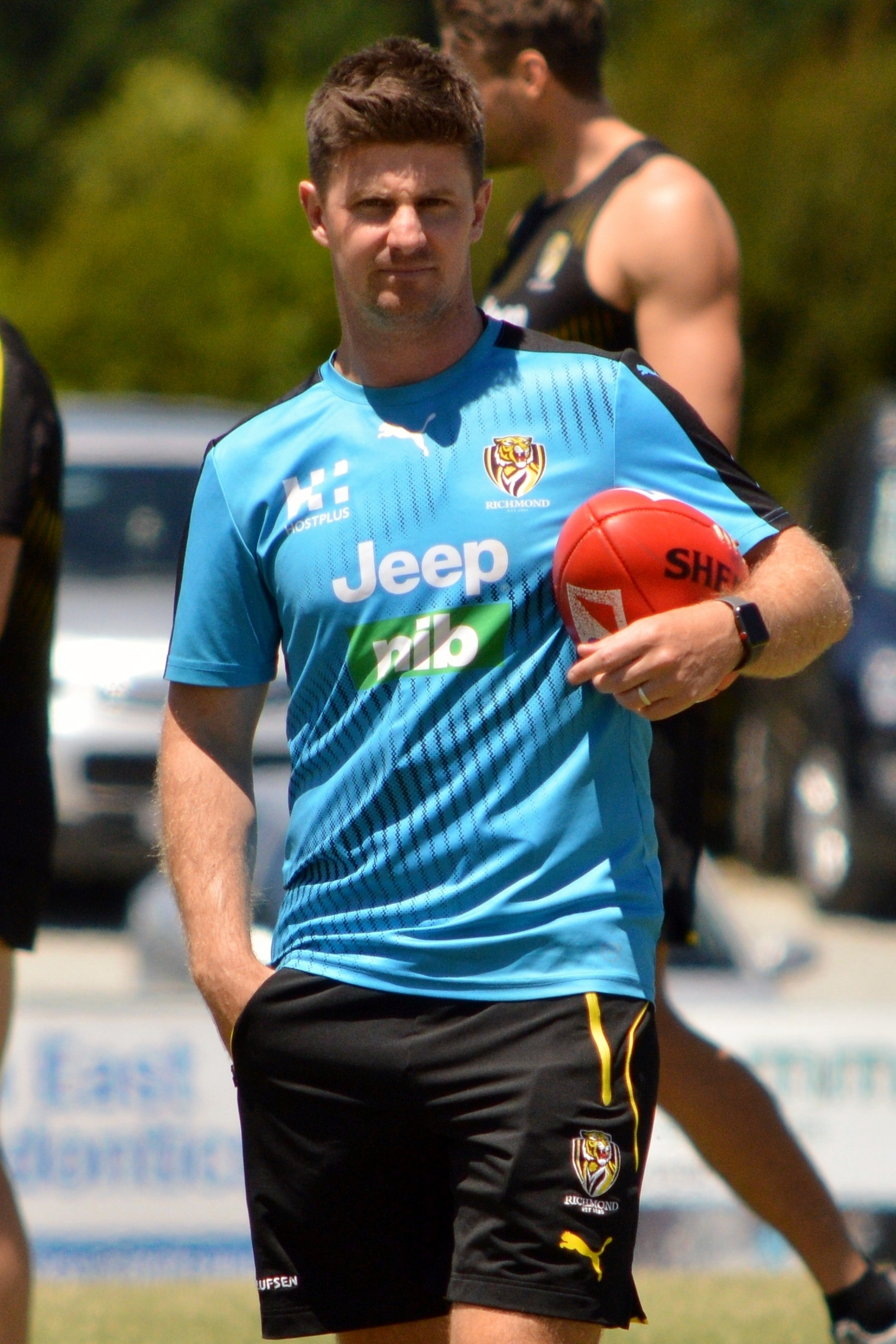
- McQualter in January 2018

Personal information
- Full name: Andrew Bruce McQualter
- Nickname: Mini
- Born: 9 June 1986 (age 40); Traralgon, Victoria
- Original team: Gippsland Power (TAC Cup)
- Draft: #17, 2004 National Draft, St Kilda
- Height: 179 cm (5 ft 10 in)
- Position: Forward

Playing career^{1}
Years	Club	Games (Goals)
2005–2011	St Kilda	89 (37)
2012	Gold Coast	5 (2)
Total		94 (39)

Coaching career^{3}
Years	Club	Games (W–L–D)
2023	Richmond	13 (7–6–0)
2025–	West Coast	46 (5–41–0)
Total		59 (12–47–0)
- ^{1} Playing statistics correct to the end of 2012.^{3} Coaching statistics correct as of round 24, 2026.

Andrew McQualter (born 9 June 1986) is the current senior coach of the West Coast Eagles in the Australian Football League (AFL). McQualter played 89 games for the St Kilda Football Club and 5 games as a rookie for the Gold Coast Suns. He later moved into coaching, serving as the caretaker senior coach at the Richmond Football Club after Damien Hardwick stepped down in May 2023. McQualter was appointed West Coast's senior coach in September 2024 after the replacement of caretaker senior West Coast Eagles coach Jarrad Schofield.

== Early years and junior football ==
McQualter was raised in Traralgon, Victoria, and attended Gippsland Grammar School and later Caulfield Grammar School as a boarder along with future St Kilda teammate Brendon Goddard. McQualter and Goddard both captained the school's First XVIII football team.

McQualter captained the Victorian Country Under-16 and Under-18 teams at the National Football Championships.

== Playing career ==
=== St Kilda ===
McQualter was drafted by St Kilda with a first round selection, number 17th overall in the 2004 AFL draft.

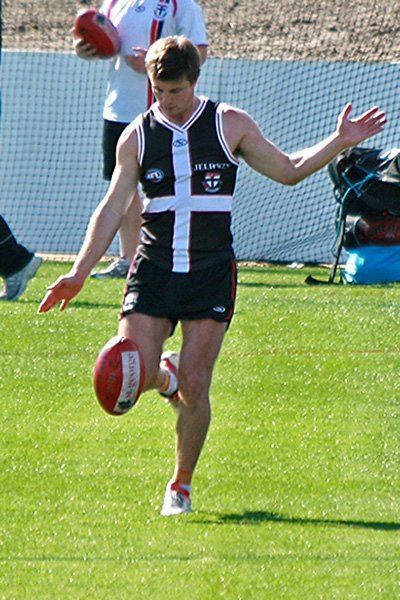
McQualter at training prior to the 2009 AFL Grand Final

McQualter debuted for St Kilda in Round 8 of the 2005 season against the West Coast Eagles at Subiaco in Perth, with 16 possessions. He averaged 13 possessions per game over seven senior games in the 2005 season. He appeared in 10 games in the 2006 season.

At the end of the 2007 season, McQualter had played 23 games, earning 137 kicks and 121 handballs, for a total of 258 disposals (an average of 11.2 possessions per game).

McQualter was officially delisted by the Saints at the end of the 2007 season, despite having another year to run on a two-year contract. He was reported as saying that he felt he had "stagnated" in his third year of football. He was then redrafted by the St Kilda Football Club onto the club's rookie list in the 2007 Draft and returned to the team.

McQualter began the 2008 season quietly on St Kilda's rookie list, but began to turn in several solid performances with St Kilda's affiliate in the Victoria Football League (VFL). With his continued good form McQualter was temporarily elevated off the rookie list and selected to play against Sydney in Round 12. He cemented his place in the senior team after several tagging jobs and played nine consecutive games, a personal best for McQualter at the time. He played his first AFL final in the 2008 1st Qualifying Final against Geelong. McQualter was promoted back onto St Kilda's primary list at the end of the 2008 season.

McQualter played in 21 of 22 matches in the 2009 season in which St Kilda qualified in first position for the 2009 finals series, winning the club's third minor premiership. St Kilda won through to the 2009 grand final after qualifying and preliminary final wins. McQualter played in the 2009 AFL Grand Final in which St Kilda were defeated by 12 points. McQualter averaged 14.4 possessions per game and kicked 22 goals in 24 matches during the 2009 season. As of the end of the 2009 season, McQualter had played in six finals matches, including one grand final.

McQualter played 25 games in 2010, including four finals matches. As of the end of the 2010 season, McQualter had played in 10 AFL finals matches, including three grand finals. He was delisted at the end of the 2011 season following the Saints' elimination final loss to the Sydney Swans.

McQualter played for St Kilda from 2005 until 2011 for a total of 89 games and kicked a total of 37 goals.

=== Gold Coast Suns ===
McQualter joined the Gold Coast Suns' rookie list in 2012 and began playing in the Suns' North East Australian Football League (NEAFL) reserves team.

McQualter played for Gold Coast Suns in his only season at the club in 2012 for a total of 5 games and 2 goals.

=== Playing statistics ===
Legend
G	Goals	K	Kicks	D	Disposals	T	Tackles
B	Behinds	H	Handballs	M	Marks

Season	Team	No.	Games	Totals							Averages (per game)						
Season	Team	No.	Games	G	B	K	H	D	M	T	G	B	K	H	D	M	T
2005	St Kilda	32	7	2	0	51	40	91	19	19	0.3	0.0	7.3	5.7	13.0	2.7	2.7
2006	St Kilda	32	10	2	1	59	53	112	47	29	0.2	0.1	5.9	5.3	11.2	4.7	2.9
2007	St Kilda	32	6	1	2	27	28	55	13	12	0.2	0.3	4.5	4.7	9.2	2.2	2.0
2008	St Kilda	32	12	2	1	65	70	135	39	41	0.2	0.1	5.4	5.8	11.3	3.3	3.4
2009	St Kilda	32	24	22	7	123	222	345	61	112	0.9	0.3	5.1	9.3	14.4	2.5	4.7
2010	St Kilda	32	25	8	7	134	200	334	103	104	0.3	0.3	5.4	8.0	13.4	4.1	4.2
2011	St Kilda	32	5	0	2	25	29	54	12	12	0.0	0.4	5.0	5.8	10.8	2.4	2.4
2012	Gold Coast	51	5	2	1	45	39	84	23	11	0.4	0.2	9.0	7.8	16.8	4.6	2.2
Career			94	39	21	529	681	1210	317	340	0.4	0.2	5.6	7.2	12.9	3.4	3.6

== Coaching career ==
=== Richmond Football Club ===
McQualter joined the Richmond Football Club in 2014, serving as a VFL player and in an assistant coaching role as development coach under senior coach Damien Hardwick. He then became a midfield assistant coach for the Richmond Football Club in 2016.

On May 25, 2023, McQualter was appointed as the caretaker senior coach of Richmond for the remainder of the 2023 season, after senior coach Damien Hardwick stepped down at the conclusion of Round 10. McQualter then coached Richmond for a total of 13 games with seven wins and six losses and then the club finished thirteenth on the ladder and did not make the finals. McQualter was not retained as senior coach of Richmond at the end of the 2023 season and was replaced by Adem Yze. McQualter then left the Richmond Football Club at the end of the 2023 season.

=== Melbourne Football Club ===
In late 2023, it was announced that McQualter had joined the Melbourne Football Club as an assistant under senior coach Simon Goodwin. McQualter parted ways with Melbourne at the end of the 2024 season.

=== West Coast Eagles ===
On 30 September 2024, McQualter was officially announced as the senior coach of the West Coast Eagles, succeeding caretaker senior coach Jarrad Schofield, who replaced senior coach Adam Simpson after Simpson was sacked in the middle of the 2024 season and becoming just the seventh senior coach in the club's history.

=== Coaching statistics ===
Statistics are correct to the end of 2025.

Team	Year	Home and Away Season					Finals			
Team	Year	Won	Lost	Drew	Win %	Position	Won	Lost	Win %	Result
RIC	2023	7	6	0	.539	13th	–	–	–	–
RIC Total		7	6	0	.538		—	—	—	–
WCE	2025	1	22	0	.043	18th	–	–	–	–
WCE Total		1	22	0	.043		—	—	—	–
Total		8	28	0	.222		–	–	–	–

== See also ==
- List of Caulfield Grammar School people
