= Clinton Jones (footballer) =

Australian rules footballer (born 1984)

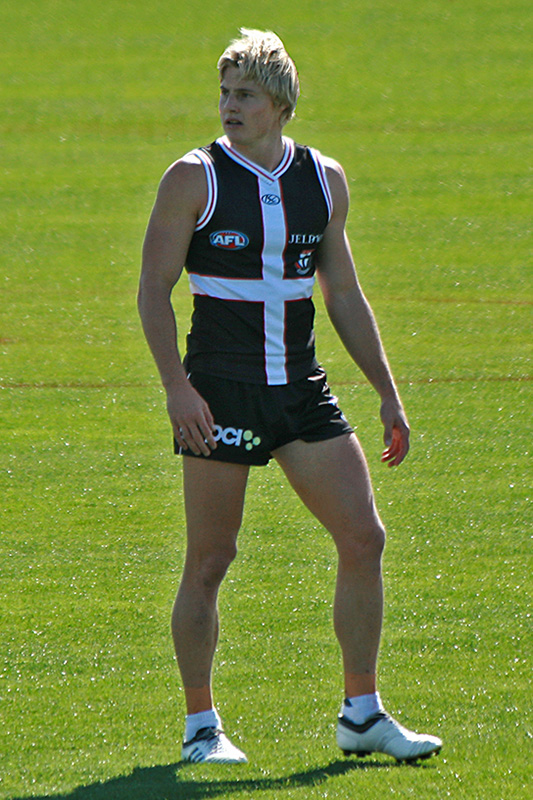

Personal information
- Full name: Clinton Jones
- Born: 2 February 1984 (age 42)
- Original team: South Fremantle (WAFL)
- Draft: No. 9, 2007 Rookie Draft, St Kilda
- Height: 183 cm (6 ft 0 in)
- Weight: 83 kg (183 lb)
- Position: Midfielder

Playing career^{1}
Years	Club	Games (Goals)
2007–2014	St Kilda	149 (40)
- ^{1} Playing statistics correct to the end of 2014.

Career highlights
- AFL * St Kilda NAB Cup Premiership 2008 * St Kilda Minor Premiership 2009 * St Kilda Grand Final 2009 * St Kilda Robert Harvey Most Professional Player Award 2009 * St Kilda Grand Final 2010 * St Kilda Leading Tackler 2011; WAFL * South Fremantle Best & Fairest x 2 * South Fremantle Grand Final 2005

Clinton Jones (born 2 February 1984) is a former Australian rules footballer who played for the St Kilda Football Club in the Australian Football League (AFL) from 2007 to 2014. He retired from professional Australian football in 2019.

== Football career ==
=== WAFL ===
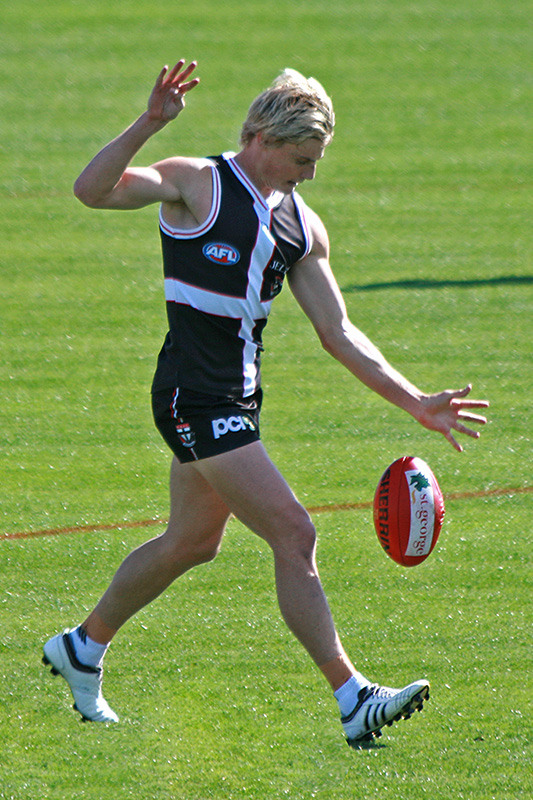
Jones at training prior to the 2009 AFL Grand Final

Jones began his career with South Fremantle in the West Australian Football League (WAFL). At South Fremantle he won consecutive best and fairest awards and was a part of South's 2005 premiership winning team. Following that grand final, he was mistakenly announced as the winner of the Simpson Medal before it was corrected and the true winner Toby McGrath was awarded the medal.

== AFL career with St Kilda ==
=== Drafted 2006 ===
Jones was drafted to the Saints as a mature aged rookie with the 9th selection in the 2006 AFL Rookie Draft at the age of 22.

Jones did not have to wait long for his AFL debut, playing his first game in St Kilda's 50 point win over the Western Bulldogs in Round 3 of the 2007 AFL regular season. He played six games in his first season, where St Kilda's underwhelming season finished without finals participation.

=== NAB Cup winner ===
His 2008 season started brightly, with Jones playing a pivotal role in St Kilda's 2008 NAB Cup winning team which defeated Richmond, Geelong, Essendon and Adelaide to win the club's first pre-season cup since 2004.

He went on to play 20 games in his second season at the Saints, including the final 17 consecutive games of the season which ended in a preliminary final. He played in his first finals win with the Saints in a semi-fnal victory over Collingwood at the MCG. Jones quickly developed a reputation as a dynamic run with player and impressive handballer, racking up an average of over 17 disposals per game for the year. He was immediately prioritised to play a nullifying role on some of the opposition teams best midfielders with immediate results.

=== 2009 minor premiership and gfand Final ===
Jones played in 21 of St Kilda's 22 home and away matches in the 2009 AFL season. St Kilda set a new club record for consecutive wins during the season, which resulted in St Kilda topping the premiership standings and winning the McClelland Trophy for the AFL minor premiership. He had 22 disposals and kicked a goal in the Saints' win in round 14 match between the only two unbeaten teams in the competition, St Kilda and Geelong, which was arguably described as the greatest home and away match of all time.

Jones played in all three finals series matches, averaging 17 disposals per finals match and kicking a crucial goal in St Kilda's three goals in less than a minute of playing time burst at the end of the second quarter in the grand final. After the season, he won the Robert Harvey Most Professional Player Award during the Saints' post season Trevor Barker Award ceremony. He was also named in the media writer and commentator Mike Sheahan's top 50 AFL players for 2009, coming in at 49th.

=== 2010 grand final ===
Before the start of the 2010 season, Jones changed his number from 38 to 4, which had previously been worn by club legends Barry Breen, Tony Lockett and Darrel Baldock among others.

Jones had his most prolific season to date in 2010, averaging 21 disposals in his 24 games for the season, whilst playing as a run with nullifying player whose main task was restricting an opposition midfielder's total disposals and effectiveness. He played in his first ever 30 disposal plus game against Fremantle in Round 4, a win by 15 points. Despite obvious adversity during the season, St Kilda qualified third for the final series. Jones had 14 disposals and kicked a goal in the Saints win in the qualifying final win against Geelong. He played in the preliminary final win and had 19 disposals in the Saints' grand final team.

=== 2011 to 2014 ===
Jones played a further 23 games in St Kilda's 2011 season. The Saints had an unimpressive start to the season, in an underwhelming 15th position after 8 rounds. The team won 12 of the last 16 matches, including 8 of the last 10 for the regular season, qualifying 6th for the finals series according to the official standings. Jones was the club's leading tackler for the season with a total of 142. He received a best on ground three Brownlow medal votes from the field umpires in the Saints' Round 20 win over Fremantle. St Kilda's season ended in an elimination final.

Jones played 17, 19 and 16 games respectively in his final 3 seasons at St Kilda between 2012 and 2014, a period in which St Kilda did not participate in any of the three finals series. Like his career in general, he consistently averaged around the 20 disposals a game.

The only controversy Jones was involved in was in September 2013 at the club's "Mad Monday" players end of season event. Jones was accused of appearing to try to set a dwarf entertainer's costume on fire with a cigarette lighter. He later apologised and was issued with a A$3000 fine by the club.

Jones was delisted by St Kilda at the end of the 2014 premiership season with a total of 149 games for his career.

=== After St Kilda ===
In February 2015, Jones was given a short-term contract by Essendon to play in the 2015 NAB Challenge as a "top-up" player due to 26 Essendon players withdrawing from the NAB Challenge because of the ongoing Essendon Football Club supplements controversy, which ultimately led to the Essendon players involved being found guilty of doping by the World Court of Arbitration for Sport and serving bans. Jones did not continue as a top-up player for Essendon during the 2015 premiership season, making his final AFL appearance the Round 23 match for St Kilda in 2014.

Jones was a player for the Perth Football Club in the Western Australian Football League (WAFL) from 2015 to 2019. He retired from football in 2019.

== Statistics ==
Statistics are correct to the end of the 2014 season

Legend
G	Goals	K	Kicks	D	Disposals	T	Tackles
B	Behinds	H	Handballs	M	Marks

Season	Team	No.	Games	Totals							Averages (per game)						
Season	Team	No.	Games	G	B	K	H	D	M	T	G	B	K	H	D	M	T
2007	St Kilda	38	6	1	1	37	22	59	13	17	0.2	0.2	6.2	3.7	9.8	2.2	2.8
2008	St Kilda	38	20	6	8	160	194	354	83	71	0.3	0.4	8.0	9.7	17.7	4.2	3.6
2009	St Kilda	38	24	9	3	188	255	443	60	116	0.4	0.1	7.8	10.6	18.5	2.5	4.8
2010	St Kilda	4	24	5	5	210	293	503	71	134	0.2	0.2	8.8	12.2	21.0	3.0	5.6
2011	St Kilda	4	23	6	5	203	241	444	54	142	0.3	0.2	8.8	10.5	19.3	2.3	6.2
2012	St Kilda	4	17	2	1	116	191	307	54	106	0.1	0.1	6.8	11.2	18.1	3.2	6.2
2013	St Kilda	4	19	6	1	205	195	400	60	70	0.3	0.1	10.8	10.3	21.1	3.2	3.7
2014	St Kilda	4	16	5	4	148	154	302	45	76	0.3	0.3	9.3	9.6	18.9	2.8	4.8
Career			149	40	28	1267	1545	2812	440	732	0.3	0.2	8.5	10.4	18.9	3.0	4.9
