= Zac Dawson =

Australian rules footballer and manager

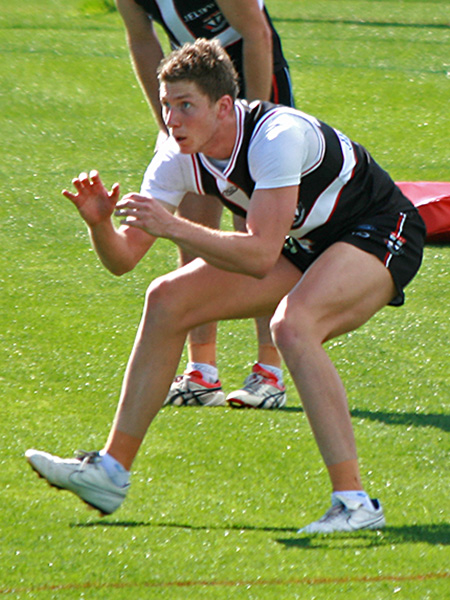
- Dawson training in 2009

Personal information
- Full name: Zachary Samuel Dawson
- Born: 22 February 1986 (age 40)
- Original team: Calder Cannons (TAC Cup)
- Draft: No. 41, 2003 national draft
- Debut: Round 21, 2005, Hawthorn vs. Richmond, at Telstra Dome
- Height: 197 cm (6 ft 6 in)
- Weight: 92 kg (203 lb)
- Position: Key defender

Playing career^{1}
Years	Club	Games (Goals)
2004–2008	Hawthorn	14 (0)
2009–2011	St Kilda	63 (4)
2012–2017	Fremantle	89 (3)
Total		166 (7)
- ^{1} Playing statistics correct to the end of 2017.

Career highlights
- WAFL premiership player: 2017

Zachary Samuel Dawson (born 22 February 1986) is a former Australian rules football player who played with the Hawthorn Football Club, St Kilda Football Club and Fremantle Football Club in the Australian Football League. In March 2019, he was appointed as Manager of the Carlton Football Club's Next Generation Academy program.

== AFL career ==
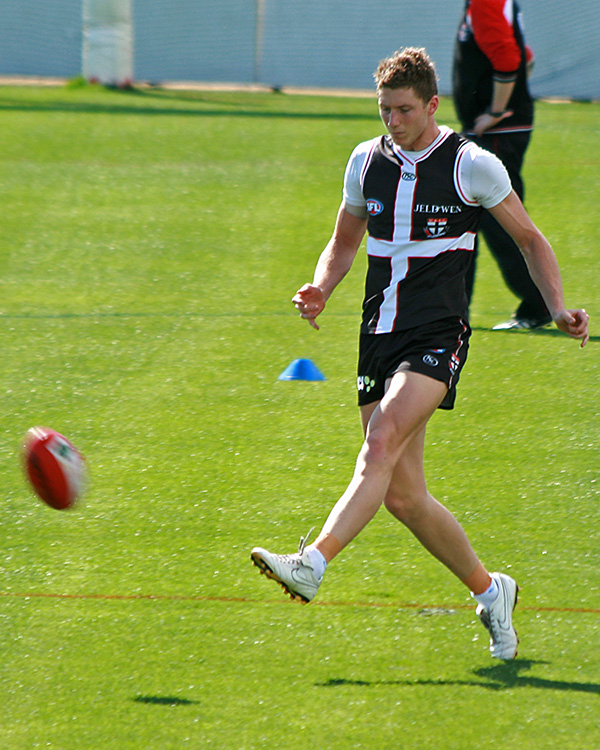
Dawson at training prior to the 2009 AFL Grand Final

=== Hawthorn ===
Dawson was recruited from Calder Cannons with pick no. 41 in the 2003 AFL draft.

Dawson's first game for Hawthorn was in 2005. He played the first eight games of 2006, until being dropped from the team, returning for four games in Rounds 15–18.

The key position prospect was being groomed for the full-back role during a 12-game stint in 2006, but his confidence received a battering after Anthony Rocca kicked eight goals on him in round two of that year. He did however, keep Geelong's Kent Kingsley goalless the following week.

Dawson failed to play a senior game for Hawthorn in 2007 and 2008. He spent the time playing for Box Hill, on one occasion he kicked eight goals. Dawson was delisted from Hawthorn after the end of the 2008 season.

=== St Kilda ===
Dawson was drafted with pick 13 by St Kilda in the 2008 rookie draft. He was promoted to the senior team for Round 1 in 2009 due to injuries to other players and played the first 16 games in an undefeated side until being reported for rough conduct in Round 16 and suspended for two matches.

Dawson played in 20 of 22 matches in the 2009 home and away rounds in which St Kilda qualified in first position for the finals, winning the club's third minor premiership.

St Kilda played off in the 2009 AFL Grand Final after qualifying and preliminary finals wins. Dawson played in the grand final in which St Kilda were defeated by 12 points.

Dawson played 20 games in 2010, and was named St Kilda's player of the finals series (jointly with Lenny Hayes). As of the end of the 2010 season, Dawson had played in seven finals matches including three grand finals.

=== Fremantle ===
In November 2011, Dawson left the Saints after deciding against signing a new contract with the club. He moved to Fremantle for the 2012 season, reuniting him with former St Kilda coach Ross Lyon.

Dawson's ability to organise fellow defenders, has been described as crucial to Ross Lyon's game plan, at both St Kilda and Fremantle.

In 2013, Dawson played in his fourth grand final and Fremantle's first. In 2014, Dawson's form peaked in the finals, where he was named Fremantle's "Player of the Finals" along with Cameron Sutcliffe. In March 2015, his contract was extended until the end of the 2017 season. However, he played only five AFL games in 2015, as a result of a series of groin injuries, followed by a thumb fracture in his first game for WAFL club Peel.

== Statistics ==
Legend
G	Goals	K	Kicks	D	Disposals	T	Tackles
B	Behinds	H	Handballs	M	Marks

Season	Team	No.	Games	Totals							Averages (per game)							Votes
Season	Team	No.	Games	G	B	K	H	D	M	T	G	B	K	H	D	M	T	Votes
2004	Hawthorn	26	0	—	—	—	—	—	—	—	—	—	—	—	—	—	—	0
2005	Hawthorn	26	2	0	0	8	12	20	5	4	0.0	0.0	4.0	6.0	10.0	2.5	2.0	0
2006	Hawthorn	26	12	0	0	35	68	103	37	24	0.0	0.0	2.9	5.7	8.6	3.1	2.0	0
2007	Hawthorn	26	0	—	—	—	—	—	—	—	—	—	—	—	—	—	—	0
2008	Hawthorn	26	0	—	—	—	—	—	—	—	—	—	—	—	—	—	—	0
2009	St Kilda	43	23	2	1	127	157	284	136	39	0.1	0.0	5.5	6.8	12.4	5.9	1.7	0
2010	St Kilda	6	20	1	3	99	122	221	89	22	0.0	0.2	5.0	6.1	11.0	4.4	1.1	0
2011	St Kilda	6	20	1	1	61	153	214	80	25	0.0	0.0	3.0	7.6	10.7	4.0	1.2	0
2012	Fremantle	3	18	2	2	60	107	167	50	21	0.1	0.1	3.3	5.9	9.3	2.8	1.2	0
2013	Fremantle	3	24	0	0	60	158	218	72	40	0.0	0.0	2.5	6.6	9.1	3.0	1.7	0
2014	Fremantle	3	22	1	0	60	162	222	77	26	0.0	0.0	2.7	7.4	10.1	3.5	1.2	0
2015	Fremantle	3	5	0	0	10	35	45	13	6	0.0	0.0	2.0	7.0	9.0	2.6	1.2	0
2016	Fremantle	3	18	0	0	44	111	155	52	33	0.0	0.0	2.4	6.2	8.6	2.9	1.8	0
2017	Fremantle	3	2	0	0	3	5	8	2	5	0.0	0.0	3.4	6.6	10.0	3.7	1.5	0
Career			166	7	7	567	1090	1657	613	245	0.0	0.0	3.4	6.6	10.0	3.7	1.5	0

== Honours and achievements ==
Team

- Minor premiership (St Kilda): 2009
- Minor premiership (Fremantle): 2015
- WAFL premiership player (Peel Thunder): 2017
