= Raphael Clarke =

Australian rules footballer

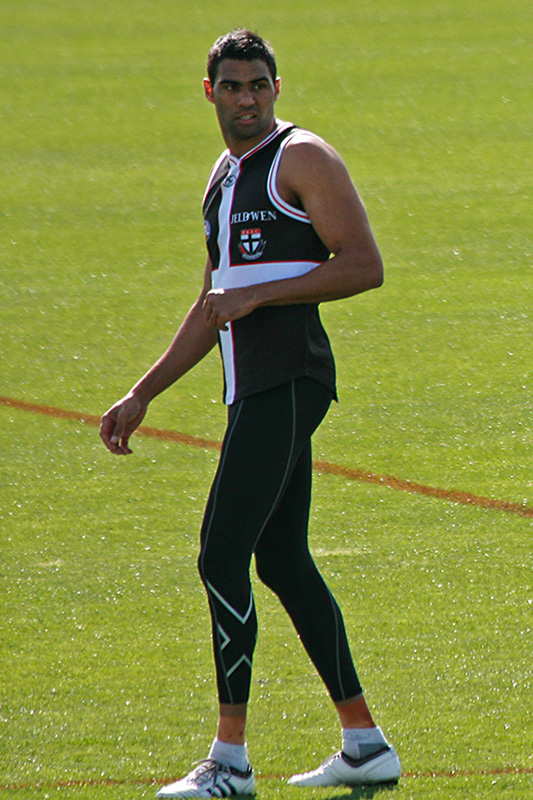

Personal information
- Full name: Raphael Clarke
- Born: 24 September 1985 (age 41); Yirrkala, Northern Territory, Australia
- Original team: St Mary's (NTFL)
- Draft: No. 8, 2003 National Draft, St Kilda
- Height: 188 cm (6 ft 2 in)
- Weight: 85 kg (187 lb)
- Position: Defender

Playing career^{1}
Years	Club	Games (Goals)
2004–2012	St Kilda	85 (9)

Representative team honours
Years	Team	Games (Goals)
2009	Indigenous All-Stars	1
- ^{1} Playing statistics correct to the end of Round 20 2012.

Career highlights
- Pre Season Premiership 2008; 2005 AFL Rising Star nominee

Raphael Clarke (born 24 September 1985) is an Australian rules footballer who played for the St Kilda Football Club in the Australian Football League (AFL) from 2004 to 2012. His brother Xavier Clarke also played for St Kilda.

== AFL career ==
Clarke was recruited from Northern Territory Football League (NTFL) club St Mary's with pick Number Eight in the 2003 AFL draft. He made his debut in Round 17, 2004 against Essendon and was an AFL Rising Star nominee in 2005.

=== 2008 season ===
Clarke had a strong start to the year in his fifth season at St Kilda, playing in their 2008 NAB Cup winning side.

After playing just five of the first 20 rounds in 2008 because of health and personal issues, Clarke finished the year in outstanding fashion, starring at half-back in the semi-final win against Collingwood and being one of the Saints' few good players in the preliminary final loss to Hawthorn.

Clarke played in 12 of 22 matches in the 2009 AFL season home and away rounds in which St Kilda qualified in first position for the finals, winning the club's third minor premiership.

St Kilda qualified for the 2009 AFL Grand Final after qualifying and preliminary finals wins. Clarke played in the grand final in which St Kilda were defeated by 12 points.

Clarke was delisted by St Kilda at the conclusion of the 2012 season and played with St Albans Football Club in the Geelong Football League in 2013 before coaching the Flying Boomerangs national Indigenous youth team in their tour of South Africa.
