= Sean Dempster =

Australian rules footballer, born 1984

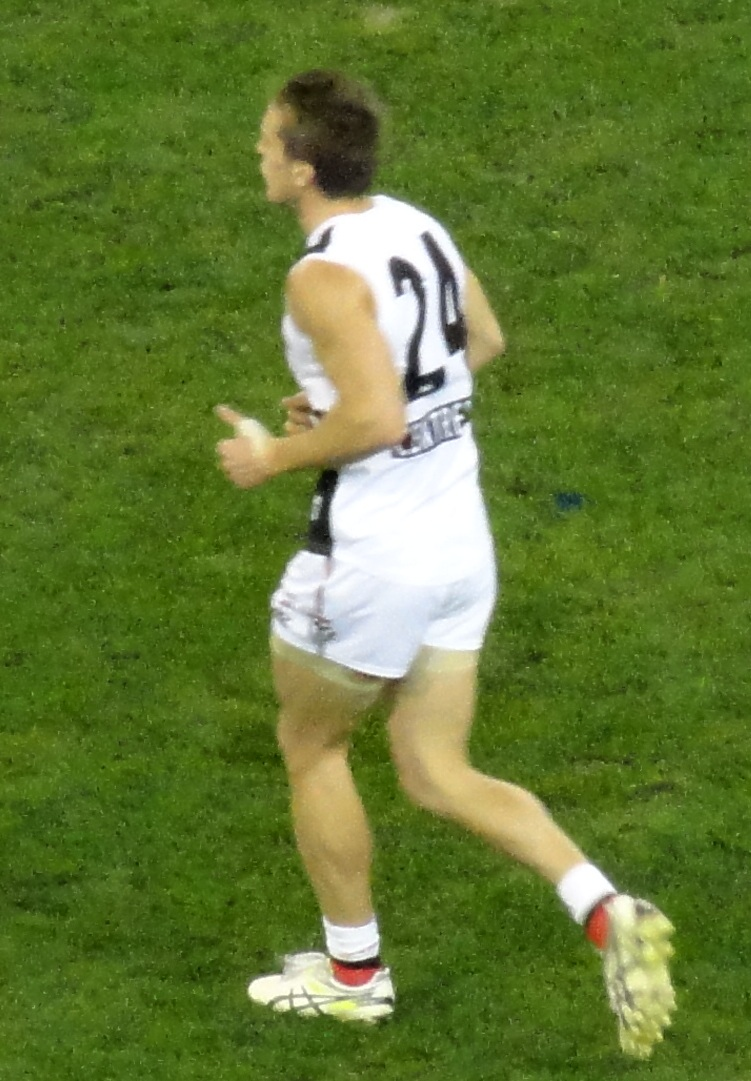
- Dempster playing for St Kilda in 2011

Personal information
- Full name: Sean Dempster
- Born: 20 January 1984 (age 42)
- Original team: Gippsland Power (TAC Cup)
- Draft: No. 34, 2002 national draft
- Height: 191 cm (6 ft 3 in)
- Weight: 87 kg (192 lb)
- Position: Defender

Playing career^{1}
Years	Club	Games (Goals)
2005–2007	Sydney	54 (8)
2008–2017	St Kilda	158 (13)
Total		222 (21)
- ^{1} Playing statistics correct to the end of 2017.

Career highlights
- AFL Premiership 2005; All-Australian team 2012; 3rd in Trevor Barker Award 2011, 2012, 2014, 2015

Sean Dempster (born 20 January 1984) is a former Australian rules footballer who played for the Sydney Swans and St Kilda Football Club in the Australian Football League (AFL).

== Early life ==
Born in 1984, Dempster grew up in the Victorian town of Mallacoota. As there was no football club in the town, Dempster played junior football with the Snowy Rovers Football Club in Orbost. He later playing with Gippsland Power in the TAC Cup before being recruited by the Sydney Swans in the 2002 national AFL draft under the father–son rule – his father, Graham Dempster, having played 64 games for South Melbourne Football Club between 1972 and 1979.

== AFL career ==
=== Sydney Swans ===
Dempster played his first AFL game in Round 3, 2005, against the Brisbane Lions wearing guernsey number 26. In the 2005 AFL season, he played 22 matches, first as a defender and later on the wing. He was a member of Sydney's 2005 AFL Grand Final premiership team. In the following AFL season, he played 18 matches, mostly as a defender, including the Sydney losing grand final team. He played a total of 54 games for Sydney before being traded to the St Kilda Football Club with Adam Schneider at the end of the 2007 AFL season.

=== St Kilda Football Club ===
Dempster played 19 games for St Kilda in 2008. He injured his knee in Round 22 and was unable to play in the finals that year.

Dempster played in eight of the 22 matches in the 2009 season's home and away rounds in which St Kilda qualified in first position for the finals series, winning the club's third minor premiership.

St Kilda qualified for the 2009 AFL Grand Final after qualifying and preliminary finals wins. Dempster played in the grand final in which St Kilda were defeated by Geelong.

Dempster played 14 games in 2010, including four finals matches.

As of the end of the 2010 season, Dempster had played in 13 finals series matches, including five grand finals.

In 2012, Dempster played all 22 matches of St Kilda's season, and demonstrated strong form throughout. Dempster was named on the half-back flank of the All-Australian team after his impressive season.

In April 2017, Dempster announced his retirement from the AFL, effective immediately. The decision came as a result of a number of concussions Dempster suffered throughout his career, deciding it was too much of a risk to play football again and receive another blow to the head, having started a young family. He was the last remaining player from the Sydney Swans' 2005 premiership side to retire.

== Statistics ==
Legend
G	Goals	K	Kicks	D	Disposals	T	Tackles
B	Behinds	H	Handballs	M	Marks

Season	Team	No.	Games	Totals							Averages (per game)						
Season	Team	No.	Games	G	B	K	H	D	M	T	G	B	K	H	D	M	T
2005	Sydney	26	22	0	1	91	57	148	42	56	0.0	0.0	4.1	2.6	6.7	1.9	2.5
2006	Sydney	26	18	5	2	82	39	121	41	47	0.3	0.1	4.6	2.2	6.7	2.3	2.6
2007	Sydney	26	14	3	4	91	60	151	52	28	0.2	0.3	6.5	4.3	10.8	3.7	2.0
2008	St Kilda	24	19	3	2	132	102	234	72	52	0.2	0.1	6.9	5.4	12.3	3.8	2.7
2009	St Kilda	24	9	3	4	55	43	98	37	32	0.3	0.4	6.1	4.8	10.9	4.1	3.6
2010	St Kilda	24	14	1	2	91	82	173	73	49	0.1	0.1	6.5	5.9	12.4	5.2	3.5
2011	St Kilda	24	23	2	6	181	140	321	91	73	0.1	0.3	7.9	6.1	14.0	4.0	3.2
2012	St Kilda	24	22	0	2	274	115	389	155	43	0.0	0.1	12.5	5.2	17.7	7.0	2.0
2013	St Kilda	24	19	1	0	200	102	302	113	35	0.1	0.0	10.5	5.4	15.9	5.9	1.8
2014	St Kilda	24	22	2	3	255	111	366	136	29	0.1	0.1	11.6	5.0	16.6	6.2	1.3
2015	St Kilda	24	21	0	0	238	134	372	148	36	0.0	0.0	11.3	6.4	17.7	7.0	1.7
2016	St Kilda	24	19	1	0	148	109	257	109	27	0.1	0.0	7.8	5.7	13.5	5.7	1.4
Career			222	21	26	1838	1094	2932	1069	507	0.1	0.1	8.3	4.9	13.2	4.8	2.3
