= Steven Baker (Australian footballer) =

Australian rules footballer

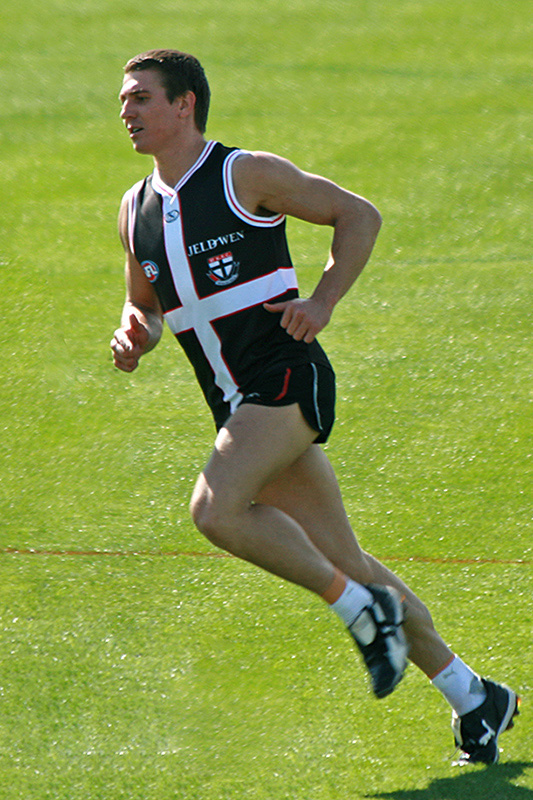

Personal information
- Full name: Steven Paul Baker
- Born: 22 May 1980 (age 46)
- Original team: Geelong Falcons (TAC Cup)
- Draft: No. 27, 1998 National Draft, St Kilda
- Height: 179 cm (5 ft 10 in)
- Weight: 83 kg (183 lb)
- Position: Defender

Playing career^{1}
Years	Club	Games (Goals)
1999–2011	St Kilda	203 (35)
- ^{1} Playing statistics correct to the end of 2011.

Career highlights
- Trevor Barker Award 2005; 3rd in Trevor Barker Award 2002

Steven Paul Baker (born 22 May 1980) is an Australian rules footballer who played for the St Kilda Football Club in the Australian Football League (AFL) from 1999 to 2011.

== AFL career ==
Baker was drafted in the 1998 AFL draft at pick 27 in a second round pick to the St Kilda Football Club.

Baker played in St Kilda’s 2004 Wizard Home Loans Cup winning side – St Kilda's second pre-season cup win.

In 2005, he tied with Luke Ball in St Kilda's best and fairest award, the Trevor Barker Award. Previous to this his best ranking was third in 2004. On 28 May 2005, Baker and teammate Fraser Gehrig played their 100th and 200th AFL games respectively.

Baker played in St Kilda’s 2008 NAB Cup winning side.

Baker played in 21 of 22 matches in the 2009 season's home and away rounds in which St Kilda qualified in first position for the finals series, winning the club’s third minor premiership.

St Kilda qualified for the 2009 grand final after qualifying and preliminary finals wins. Baker played in the 2009 AFL Grand Final in which St Kilda were defeated by 12 points.

The athletic Baker has caused some controversy during his career, playing as a tagger (run with) player rather than a set position player. He used a variety of tactics to prevent his opponent from getting the ball including standing on their feet and repeated hits to their arm.

Baker was selected in St Kilda's two grand final matches against Collingwood in 2010.

As of the end of the 2010 season, Baker had played in 11 AFL finals matches including three grand finals.

Following St Kilda's elimination final defeat on 10 September 2011, St Kilda announced that Baker's playing career with the club was finished. Initially the club said that Baker was retiring but, after this was denied by Baker, the club later issued a reworded statement regarding Baker and several other players.

== Tribunal ==
Baker was regarded as one of the most efficient taggers in the league, but often stretched the rules, leading to a very high number of tribunal appearances and suspensions. He was suspended for a total of 28 matches during his AFL career.

=== Jeff Farmer incident ===
On 18 August 2007, Baker was linked to an incident behind play, in the third quarter of a match against Fremantle at Telstra Dome. Fremantle forward Jeff Farmer was assisted from the playing area at Telstra Dome, with blood coming from his nose and suffering concussion. The incident was not witnessed by umpires or captured on film, but on the basis of evidence from a Fremantle trainer, Baker was charged with rough conduct and referred to the AFL Tribunal.

On 21 August 2007 it was announced that Baker had been found guilty and suspended for seven matches, which was at the time the longest suspension for a single incident since the tribunal system was changed to a points-based system. The penalty was made so severe due to a 40% points loading due to Baker's record of four games suspended in the previous three years, and controversial 127.5 carry-over points; Baker had been suspended for two separate incidents in Round 6 against Carlton, but a loophole (closed immediately thereafter) allowed him to serve a shorter suspension and carry-over more than 100 points.

In an interview in 2012 Baker described the off-camera incident, stated that he "stopped and propped" in an attempt to stop Farmer's run, threw his head back and headbutted Farmer, intending to do so but not expecting to "get him that good".

=== Steve Johnson incident ===
On 28 June 2010, after St Kilda's Round 13 game against Geelong, Baker was charged four times for separate incidents – three for striking and one for misconduct (specifically, making unreasonable and unnecessary contact with an injured player) – against Geelong's Steve Johnson after the pair clashed several times during the first half when Baker was tagging Johnson; Johnson was himself also charged twice for striking Baker. Baker became the first person to be reported for misconduct towards an injured player. After accepting early pleas for the three striking offences, and having the misconduct charge upheld by the tribunal, Baker was suspended for a total nine matches. This is the longest suspension given from a single match (but not for a single incident) under the points-based tribunal system.

=== Temporary de-registration ===
While playing for the Sorrento Football Club in the Mornington Peninsula Nepean Football League in 2013, Baker was suspended for six weeks for unduly rough conduct against an opponent in a pre-season match. The sanction took Baker's total career suspensions beyond the threshold to be automatically deregistered from playing football for life, ending his playing career at all levels. Baker successfully appealed the six-week suspension, enabling him to continue playing.
