= Jason Blake (footballer) =

Australian rules footballer

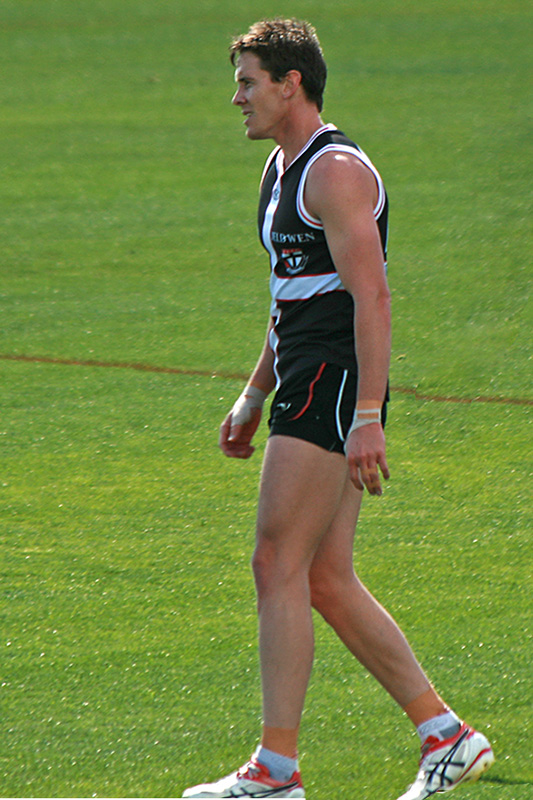

Personal information
- Full name: Jason Blake
- Born: 15 March 1981 (age 45)
- Original team: Prahran
- Draft: No. 24, 1999 National Draft, St Kilda
- Height: 189 cm (6 ft 2 in)
- Weight: 90 kg (198 lb)
- Position: Defender / Ruck

Playing career^{1}
Years	Club	Games (Goals)
2000–2013	St Kilda	219 (38)
- ^{1} Playing statistics correct to the end of 2013.

Career highlights
- Pre Season Premiership 2004, 2008

Jason Blake (born 15 March 1981) is a former Australian rules footballer for the St Kilda Football Club in the Australian Football League (AFL). An "undersized tall defender and occasional ruckman", he held the record for the most games played (209) without receiving any Brownlow Medal votes until he eventually received two Brownlow votes for Round 11 in 2012. The record was subsequently beaten by Nick Smith.

== AFL career ==
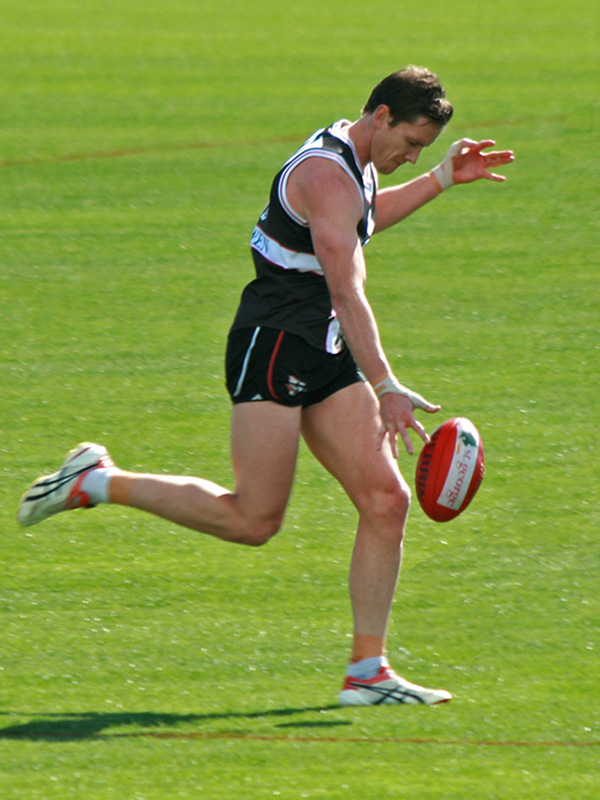
Blake at training prior to the 2009 AFL Grand Final

Blake was recruited as the number 24 draft pick in the 1999 AFL draft from the Prahran Football Club. During the Under 18 National Championships he had been named All Australian along with Ben Johnson, Rhyce Shaw, Darren Glass, Joel Corey and Jonathan Brown. During the series he managed to shut down Matthew Pavlich in the first game, and later did the same to Brown. Blake made his debut for St Kilda in Round 9, 2000 against the Western Bulldogs, and went on to play 13 games in his first year with the Saints.

=== 2004 Wizard Cup ===
Blake played in St Kilda's 2004 Wizard Home Loans Cup winning side - St Kilda's second pre-season cup win.

Blake is a versatile footballer, having spent much of the period between 2003 and 2006 as a ruckman for St Kilda, but has also been able to play forward, back and as a tagger in the midfield. Blake capped off an improved 2007 season by finishing ninth in the club's Trevor Barker Award for the best and fairest player.

=== 2007 season ===
Blake played his 100th match for the Saints in round 9 of 2007 against Fremantle at Subiaco.

=== 2008 NAB Cup ===
Blake played in St Kilda's 2008 AFL National Australia Bank Cup winning side - St Kilda Football Club's 3rd AFL Cup Win.

=== 2009 season ===
Blake played in 22 of 22 matches in the 2009 home and away rounds in which St Kilda qualified in first position for the finals, winning the club's third minor premiership.

St Kilda qualified for the 2009 AFL Grand Final after qualifying and preliminary finals wins. Blake played in the 2009 AFL Grand Final in which St Kilda were defeated by 12 points.

=== 2010 season ===
Blake played 26 games in 2010, including four finals matches, and finished in the top 10 of St Kilda's best and fairest, the Trevor Barker Award, for the fourth year in succession. As of the end of the 2011 season, Blake had played in 15 AFL finals matches, including three grand finals. In the 2007 through 2010 seasons, he played 96 out of 98 games.

=== 2011 season ===
By the end of the 2011 season, Blake had played 199 games, including 16 finals, without polling a single Brownlow Medal vote, more than any other player in VFL/AFL history. This easily surpassed the old record of 167 games set by Ross Henshaw. He was delisted at the end of the 2011 season, but was redrafted by the club.

=== 2012 season ===
Blake played his 200th game in the first round match against Port Adelaide. In the 2012 Brownlow Medal count, Blake received his first ever votes in his 210th game (194th home and away game) of AFL football in the Round 11 game against the Gold Coast Suns. The votes were met with large applause from his St Kilda teammates present at the count.

== Personal life ==
During 2008, Blake studied a double degree in Bachelor of Civil Engineering (Construction Management) and a Bachelor of Business (Finance Specialisation) at RMIT University, and worked eight hours a week at Thinc Projects, construction, management and consulting firm, on top of his footballing duties with St Kilda. For his efforts, Blake was awarded the AFL Players Association's Education and Training Excellence Award.
