= List of St Kilda Football Club coaches =

The following is a list of coaches who have coached the St Kilda Football Club at a game of Australian rules football in the Australian Football League (AFL), formerly the VFL.

== VFL/AFL ==
No.	Coach	P	W	L	D	W%	Years
1	Alex Hall	13	4	9	0	30.77	1906
2	Mick Grace	19	10	9	0	52.63	1908
3	Jimmy Smith	49	16	33	0	32.65	1909, 1915, 1918
4	Eddie Drohan	18	2	16	0	11.11	1911
5	George Sparrow	63	37	26	0	58.73	1913, 1920, 1928–29
6	Dave McNamara	50	22	26	2	46.00	1914, 1922–23
7	Wels Eicke	32	11	21	0	34.38	1919, 1924
8	Charlie Ricketts	27	5	21	1	20.37	1920–21
9	Norm Clark	35	14	21	0	40.00	1925–26
10	George Heinz	18	8	10	0	44.44	1927
11	Bill Cubbins	18	8	10	0	44.44	1930
12	Charlie Hardy	25	9	16	0	36.00	1931–32
13	Stuart King	11	2	9	0	18.18	1932
14	Col Deane	18	6	12	0	33.33	1933
15	Colin Watson	18	9	9	0	50.00	1934
16	Dan Minogue	54	30	24	0	55.56	1935–37
17	Ansell Clarke	55	28	27	0	50.91	1938–40
18	Bill Patterson	1	0	1	0	0.00	1938
19	Jack Knight	18	3	15	0	16.67	1941
20	Reg Garvin	24	7	16	1	31.25	1942–43
21	Hugh Thomas	38	8	28	2	23.68	1944–45
22	Allan Hird	38	5	32	1	14.47	1946–47
23	Fred Froude	56	14	41	1	25.89	1948–50
24	Fred Green	18	5	13	0	27.78	1951
25	Col Williamson	37	7	30	0	18.92	1952–53
26	Les Foote	36	5	30	1	15.28	1954–55
27	Alan Killigrew	54	19	34	1	36.11	1956–58
28	Jim Francis	36	18	18	0	50.00	1959–60
29	Allan Jeans	332	193	138	1	58.28	1961–76
30	Eric Guy	6	3	3	0	50.00	1972, 1974
31	Ross G. Smith	22	3	17	2	18.18	1977
32	Mike Patterson	46	14	31	1	31.52	1978–80
33	Alex Jesaulenko	64	13	49	2	21.88	1980–82
34	Tony Jewell	26	5	21	0	19.23	1983–84
35	Graeme Gellie	62	10	52	0	16.13	1984–86
36	Darrel Baldock	62	18	44	0	29.03	1987–89
37	Allan Davis	4	2	2	0	50.00	1987
38	Ken Sheldon	89	48	40	1	54.49	1990–93
39	Stan Alves	115	55	59	1	48.26	1994–98
40	Tim Watson	44	12	31	1	28.41	1999–2000
41	Malcolm Blight	15	3	12	0	20.00	2001
42	Grant Thomas	123	63	59	1	51.63	2001–06
43	Ross Lyon	121	76	41	4	64.46	2007–11
44	Scott Watters	44	17	27	0	38.64	2012–13
45	Alan Richardson	126	43	81	2	34.12	2014–19
46	Brett Ratten	68	34	34	0	50.00	2019–22 (Note: Brendon Lade coached St Kilda to a win in Round 5, 2022. Brett Ratten missed the game due to illness.)
43	Ross Lyon (Note: Ross Lyon returned to coach St Kilda in Round 1, 2023. This section correct to Rd 24, 2025.)	70	33	37	0	47.14	2023–

Key:

P = Played
W = Won
L = Lost
D = Drew
W% = Win percentage

== AFL Women's ==
Season(s)	Coach	Notes
2020–2021	Peta Searle	
2022 (S6)–	Nick Dal Santo	
