= Harry Comte =

Australian rules footballer (1909–1945)

Personal information
- Full name: William Henry James Comte
- Born: 10 March 1909; Moama, New South Wales
- Died: 30 May 1945 (aged 36); Tarakan Island, Japanese-occupied Dutch East Indies
- Original team: Echuca
- Height: 175 cm (5 ft 9 in)
- Weight: 71 kg (157 lb)

Playing career^{1}
Years	Club	Games (Goals)
1930–1937	St Kilda	104 (55)
- ^{1} Playing statistics correct to the end of 1937.

William Henry James Comte (10 March 1909 – 30 May 1945) was an Australian rules footballer who played with St Kilda in the Victorian Football League (VFL), and Sandringham in the Victorian Football Association (VFA) during the 1930s.

He fought in World War II with the 2/24th Battalion, Second A.I.F., and died of wounds sustained in action during the 1945 Battle of Tarakan.

== Family ==
The second son of William Thomas Comte (1881–????), and Matilda Comte (1884–1943), née Flowers, William Henry James Comte was born at Moama, in New South Wales on 10 March 1909.

He married Ruby Irene "Connie" Curtis (later, Mrs Jack Shearer) on 31 May 1941. They had one son: John Henry Comte (1942–2018).

== Football ==
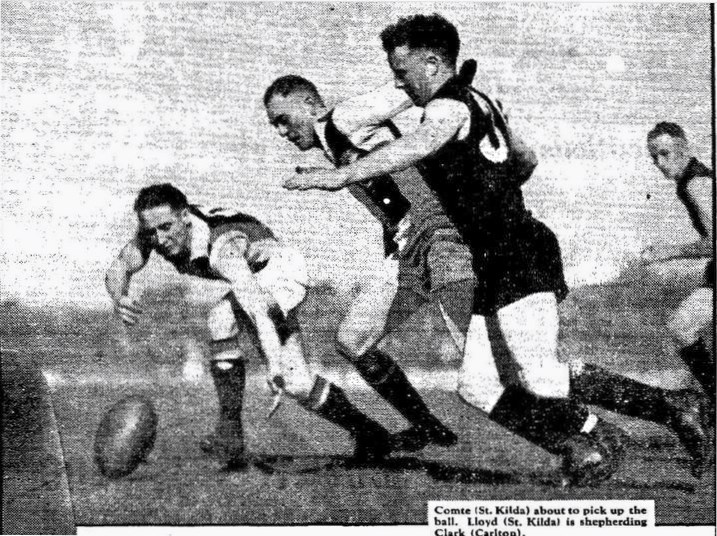
Harry Comte in action against Carlton's Ansell Clarke, with St Kilda's Stan Lloyd shepherding (1935)

=== Echuca (BFL) ===
Recruited from the Moama Junior Football Club, he played for the Echuca Football Club (coached by ex-Fitzroy footballer Steve Donnellan) in the Bendigo Football League for three seasons (1927–1929).

He was the club's best and fairest in his first year at the club, and played a number of games over those three seasons for combined Bendigo League teams.

=== St Kilda (VFL) ===
Comte usually played as a rover or in defence. He won St Kilda's best and fairest in 1933.

=== Sandringham (VFA) ===
Cleared from St Kilda to Sandringham on 13 April 1938, he was only able to play 17 matches over the two years he was with Sandringham (1938–1939), due to the knee injuries that had ended his career at St Kilda.

== Military service ==
He enlisted for service with the Second AIF and served with the 2/24 Australian Infantry Battalion.

== Death ==
He died at Tarakan Island on 30 May 1945 of wounds he sustained in action on 29 May 1945, and was buried at the Labuan War Cemetery.

== See also ==
- List of Victorian Football League players who died on active service
