= Rod Butterss =

Australian businessman and sports administrator

Roderick "Rod" Butterss is a former Australian investor, who held stakes in property development and the recruiting industry.

During the late 1970s, Butterss played in the St Kilda Football Club reserves side, but never made it to senior level. He developed a long association with the club, and became president of the club in 2000, and resigned in 2007 due to a serious challenge from another party led by Greg Westaway. The entire St Kilda board followed Butterss and resigned the same day.

Butterss founded information technology head-hunter firm Icon Recruitment in 1989 before selling the successful business to United States recruitment giant Adecco for a substantial sum in 1997. Five years after the sale he bought half of his brother's technology recruitment firm Ises, which was sold in 2007 to Peoplebank.

In 2006, he sold his Brighton home for $11.6 million.

During his St Kilda presidency, he was best known for his association with one-time close friend and neighbour Grant Thomas, whom he met in the St Kilda reserves in the late 1970s. The friendship cooled and in 2006 Thomas was sacked.

He was married to socialite Susie McLean in February 2009 but separated in July 2009.

On 23 May 2013 Adaps announced that Rod joined the IT Recruitment specialist as chief executive officer. However, he was removed less than 18 months years later and replaced by Anand Tatavarthi in December 2014.

Sporting positions
Preceded by Andrew Plympton	St Kilda Football Club president 2001–2007	Succeeded by Greg Westaway
