= Jack Drinan =

Australian rules footballer

Personal information
- Full name: Jack Drinan
- Born: 19 October 1923
- Died: 28 June 2013 (aged 89)
- Original team: Balaclava CYMS (CYMSFA)
- Height: 178 cm (5 ft 10 in)
- Weight: 80 kg (176 lb)

Playing career^{1}
Years	Club	Games (Goals)
1947–48	St Kilda	20 (1)
- ^{1} Playing statistics correct to the end of 1948.

Jack Drinan (19 October 1923 – 28 June 2013) was an Australian rules footballer who played with St Kilda in the Victorian Football League (VFL). His younger brother Keith Drinan also played for and spent time as captain of St Kilda.
