= Harry Lever =

Australian rules footballer

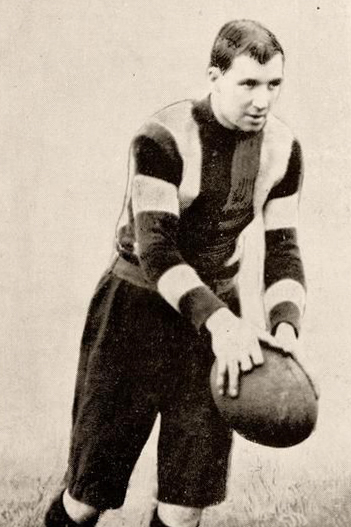
- Lever in 1910

Personal information
- Full name: Henry Hulm Lever
- Born: 5 January 1886; Parramatta, New South Wales
- Died: 19 July 1970 (aged 84); Geelong West, Victoria
- Original team: Brighton / Elwood
- Height: 178 cm (5 ft 10 in)
- Weight: 76 kg (168 lb)

Playing career^{1}
Years	Club	Games (Goals)
1905–1915, 1918–1919, 1921–1922	St Kilda	218 (6)
- ^{1} Playing statistics correct to the end of 1922.

Henry Hulm Lever (5 January 1886 – 19 July 1970) was an Australian rules footballer who played with St Kilda in the Victorian Football League (VFL).

Originally playing for the Brighton Football Club in the amateur league, Lever played as a fullback in his 15-year VFL career which began in 1905. In 1907, he lost two fingers in a band saw accident. After his wound was attended to, he played for St Kilda the following afternoon.

He did not play in 1916 or 1917 as St Kilda were in recess due to World War I, while he missed 1920 as he was injured in the pre-season.

Lever was captain of St Kilda's 1913 VFL Grand Final team.

He was the first St Kilda player to play 200 games, with his 218 games for St Kilda remaining the club record until it was broken by Ross Smith in Round 21 of 1972.
