= Andrew Plympton =

Australian rules football administrator (1949–2024)

Andrew John Earlom Plympton (28 April 1949 – 24 March 2024) was an Australian sporting administrator, mainly in the sports of Australian rules football and yacht racing. He was the President of St Kilda Football Club between 1993 and 2000, during which time the club enjoyed improved success from the previous barren 20 years.

== Career ==
Under Andrew Plympton's administration St Kilda advanced to the 1997 Grand Final, its first since 1971, but lost to the Adelaide Crows by 31 points.

St Kilda also won its first ever pre-season cup in 1996 with a 58-point win over reigning premier Carlton. Plympton's reign saw an upturn in success for St Kilda and was generally regarded as a successful time in terms of turning the club around and seeing a large increase in membership for much of this time. The strict financial management Plympton brought to the club kept it afloat and laid the foundations for its later prosperity under Rod Butterss.

Plympton was also the chairman of sports merchandise retailer Beyond Sports International (formerly known as Concept Sports), chairman of Bitcoin Group, former president and Honorary Member (Life) of Australian Sailing Limited (formerly Yachting Australia) and a member of the Australian Olympic Committee executive.

Plympton was the longest serving President of Australian Sailing (formerly Yachting Australia).

== Personal life and death ==
Plympton grew up in Melbourne. He attended Brighton Grammar School.

Plympton died from lung cancer at Cabrini Hospital, Melbourne, on 24 March 2024, at the age of 74.

Preceded by Travis Payze	St Kilda Football Club president 1993–2001	Succeeded by Rod Butterss
