= 2008 St Kilda Football Club season =

St Kilda Football Club
2008 season
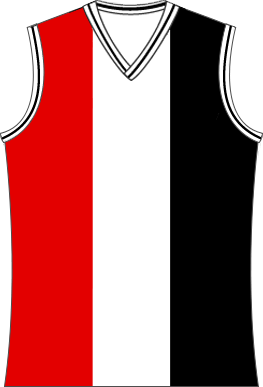
- St Kilda's guernsey for the 2008 season
- President: Greg Westaway
- Coach: Ross Lyon
- Captain: Nick Riewoldt
- Home ground: Docklands Stadium
- Preseason competition: Champions
- Home and Away: 4th
- Premiership: Preliminary finalists
- Best and Fairest: Sam Fisher
- Leading goalkicker: Nick Riewoldt (65)
- Highest home attendance: 76,707 vs Collingwood (Semi-final)
- Lowest home attendance: 22,440 vs Fremantle (Round 13)
- Average home attendance: 40,340 (including home finals)

The St Kilda Football Club's 2008 season was its 112th season in the Australian Football League (AFL).

== Summary ==
=== NAB Cup ===
The season began well with the club winning the preseason competition, the 2008 NAB Cup.

The club had wins over Richmond in the round of 16, Geelong in the quarter-finals, Essendon in the semi-finals and won the final against the Adelaide Crows by five points at Football Park (AAMI stadium) 2-7-9-(69) to 0-9-10-(64) - St Kilda's third preseason cup win in the AFL. Jason Gram won the Michael Tuck medal for the player judged best on ground during the final.

=== Regular season ===
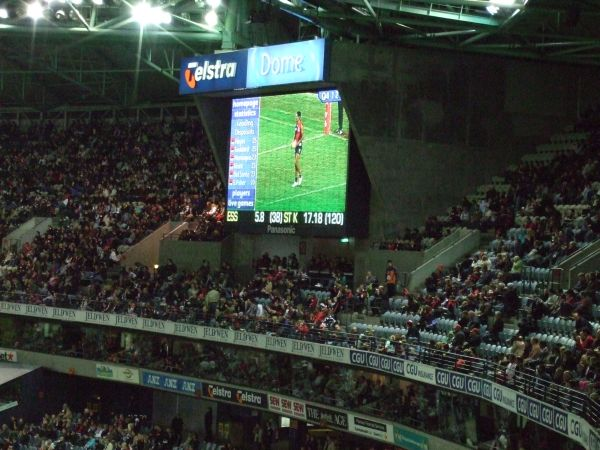
St Kilda defeated Essendon (Round 22) 31/8/08 - (Click to expand)

Despite the promising start, the Saints went on to have a mixed first half of the season with a five-win, six-loss record. After this their fortunes vastly improved and they gained a place in the finals series.

This mixed season drew both criticism and praise at differing times towards Lyon from supporters and the media. His game plan has been described as one championing accountability, similar to the Sydney Swans model by Paul Roos. Lyon's surprise move to drop midfielder Nick Dal Santo (as well as Stephen Milne) from the side was due to them not meeting these "benchmarks". Arguably, it was a turning point in the Saints' season, as they went on to win the next four games following this bold move.

In a very competitive 2008 premiership season St Kilda Football Club qualified for the 2008 premiership season finals series, finishing the home and away rounds in the top four, in fourth position, with 13 wins.

=== Finals series ===
In the 2008 finals series, St Kilda played Geelong in the qualifying finals. St Kilda 8.13 (61) lost to Geelong 17.17 (119) in front of 71,653 at the MCG. In the semi finals St Kilda 17.4 (106) defeated Collingwood 9.18 (72) in front 76,707. In the preliminary finals St Kilda 9.10 (64) lost to Hawthorn 18.10 (118) by 54 points in front of 77,002 at the MCG, being eliminated from the finals. St Kilda was eliminated by Hawthorn in the preliminary final. This was the third preliminary final lost to an eventual premier (after Sydney in 2005 and Port Adelaide in 2004) in five years.

== Fixtures ==
=== Regular season ===
| Round | St Kilda Saints | Opposition | Their Score | | Margin | Home Attendance |
|---|---|---|---|---|---|---|
| 1. (H) | 6.15 (51) | Sydney | 6.13 (49) | Win | 2 | 36,614 |
| 2. (H) | 19.11 (125) | Carlton | 12.13 (85) | Win | 40 | 43,396 |
| 3. (A) | 13.9 (87) | Western | 19.11 (125) | Loss | 38 | – |
| 4. (H) | 13.16 (94) | Geelong | 21.10 (136) | Loss | 42 | 44,368 |
| 5. (H) | 18.15 (123) | Essendon | 14.3 (87) | Win | 36 | 46,792 |
| 6. (A) | 9.7 (61) | Port Adelaide | 12.10 (82) | Loss | 21 | – |
| 7. (A) | 17.8 (110) | Richmond | 16.11 (107) | Win | 3 | – |
| 8. (H) | 14.10 (94) | Collingwood | 16.7 (103) | Loss | 9 | 48,417 |
| 9. (A) | 14.11 (95) | Brisbane | 21.15 (141) | Loss | 46 | – |
| 10. (H) | 19.15 (129) | Melbourne | 7.8 (50) | Win | 79 | 27,854 |
| 11. (H) | 11.13 (79) | Western | 15.16 (106) | Loss | 27 | 38,914 |
| 12. (A) | 9.13 (67) | Sydney | 14.18 (102) | Loss | 35 | – |
| 13. (H) | 10.5 (65) | Fremantle | 8.9 (57) | Win | 8 | 22,440 |
| 14. (A) | 12.12 (84) | North Melbourne | 9.15 (69) | Win | 15 | – |
| 15. (A) | 18.11 (119) | Carlton | 12.15 (87) | Win | 32 | - |
| 16. (H) | 18.11 (119) | Hawthorn | 13.11 (89) | Win | 30 | 41,886 |
| 17. (A) | 12.14 (86) | West Coast | 15.13 (103) | Loss | 17 | - |
| 18. (H) | 14.17 (101) | Port Adelaide | 14.9 (93) | Win | 8 | 22,878 |
| 19. (A) | 12.11 (83) | Collingwood | 14.13 (97) | Loss | 14 | - |
| 20. (A) | 17.10 (112) | Fremantle | 9.15 (69) | Win | 43 | - |
| 21. (H) | 13.17 (95) | Adelaide | 6.11 (47) | Win | 48 | 33,811 |
| 22. (A) | 21.21 (147) | Essendon | 5.9 (39) | Win | 108 | 46,161 |

=== Finals series ===
| Finals | St Kilda | Opposition | Their Score | | | Attendance | Stadium | Date |
|---|---|---|---|---|---|---|---|---|
| Qualifying Final | 8.13 (61) | Geelong | 17.17 (119) | Loss | 58 | 71,653 | MCG | 7/9/2008 |
| Semi Final | 17.4 (106) | Collingwood | 9.18 (72) | Win | 34 | 76,707 | MCG | 13/9/2008 |
| Preliminary Final | 9.10 (64) | Hawthorn | 18.10 (118) | Loss | 54 | 77,002 | MCG | 20/9/2008 |

== Ladder ==
2008 AFL ladder
| Pos | Team | Pld | W | L | D | PF | PA | PP | Pts | |
|---|---|---|---|---|---|---|---|---|---|---|
| 1 | Geelong | 22 | 21 | 1 | 0 | 2672 | 1651 | 161.8 | 84 | Finals series |
| 2 | Hawthorn (P) | 22 | 17 | 5 | 0 | 2434 | 1846 | 131.9 | 68 | Finals series |
| 3 | Western Bulldogs | 22 | 15 | 6 | 1 | 2506 | 2112 | 118.7 | 62 | Finals series |
| 4 | St Kilda | 22 | 13 | 9 | 0 | 2126 | 1923 | 110.6 | 52 | Finals series |
| 5 | Adelaide | 22 | 13 | 9 | 0 | 2017 | 1838 | 109.7 | 52 | Finals series |
| 6 | Sydney | 22 | 12 | 9 | 1 | 2095 | 1863 | 112.5 | 50 | Finals series |
| 7 | North Melbourne | 22 | 12 | 9 | 1 | 2121 | 2187 | 97.0 | 50 | Finals series |
| 8 | Collingwood | 22 | 12 | 10 | 0 | 2267 | 2038 | 111.2 | 48 | Finals series |
| 9 | Richmond | 22 | 11 | 10 | 1 | 2228 | 2288 | 97.4 | 46 | |
| 10 | Brisbane | 22 | 10 | 12 | 0 | 2156 | 2200 | 98.0 | 40 | |
| 11 | Carlton | 22 | 10 | 12 | 0 | 2217 | 2354 | 94.2 | 40 | |
| 12 | Essendon | 22 | 8 | 14 | 0 | 2130 | 2608 | 81.7 | 32 | |
| 13 | Port Adelaide | 22 | 7 | 15 | 0 | 2118 | 2208 | 95.9 | 28 | |
| 14 | Fremantle | 22 | 6 | 16 | 0 | 1988 | 2121 | 93.7 | 24 | |
| 15 | West Coast | 22 | 4 | 18 | 0 | 1670 | 2535 | 65.9 | 16 | |
| 16 | Melbourne | 22 | 3 | 19 | 0 | 1629 | 2602 | 62.6 | 12 | |

Source: AFL ladder
Rules for classification: 1) points; 2) percentage; 3) number of points for.
(P) Premiers
