= Victorian Blind Football League =

- Sport: Australian rules football
- Founded: 2018
- Administrator: AFL Victoria
- No. of teams: 3
- Country: Australia
- Headquarters: Action Indoor Sports; Tullamarine, Melbourne
- Most recent champions: Hawthorn (2nd premiership)
- Sponsor: Energy Safe Victoria
- Related competitions: AFL; VFL; FIDA

The Victorian Blind Football League (VBFL) is an Australian rules football competition for people with vision impairment. As of 2023, it has 45 players in three different teams.

The competition is mix-gendered, and open to people with different levels of vision.

== History ==
The VBFL was founded in 2018 with four teams that were not linked to AFL clubs − Bombers, Bulldogs, Hawks and Saints. Hawthorn and St Kilda formally entered the competition in 2019, with Hawthorn winning the grand final in its inaugural season.

The Bulldogs and the Bombers did not compete in the 2023 season, with Hawthorn instead entering two teams − Hawthorn Gold and Hawthorn Brown.

In 2024, Port Melbourne joined the VBFL, becoming the first Victorian Football League club to do so. As a result, Hawthorn Gold and Hawthorn Brown ceased to exist as separate teams, and a single Hawthorn team returned to the competition.

== Rule modifications ==
The VBFL includes a specifically modified football that features a continuous beeping device to assist players tracking the ball. Signage and flickering lights are centrally placed behind the goals to assist players with accuracy when kicking for goal.

== Player classifications ==
Players fall into three different classifications:

- Classification A: Players who are totally blind
- Classification B: Players who have limited vision but use hearing as their primary tracking sense
- Classification C: Players who have limited vision but use vision as their primary tracking sense

Players wear different-coloured wristbands depending on their classification, which assists umpires to officiate matches.

== Clubs ==
=== Current clubs ===
Club	Colours	Moniker	First season	Total premierships	Years of premierships					
Club	Colours	Moniker	First season	Total premierships	Years of premierships	Hawthorn	Hawks	2019	2	2019, 2024
Port Melbourne		Borough	2024	0	−					
St Kilda		Saints	2019	1	2021					

=== Former clubs ===
Club	Colours	Moniker	First season	Last season	Total premierships	Years of premierships						
Club	Colours	Moniker	First season	Last season	Total premierships	Years of premierships	Bombers	Bombers	2018	2022	0	−
Bulldogs		Bulldogs	2018	2022	1	2022						
Hawthorn Gold		Hawks, Gold	2023	2023	0	−						
Hawthorn Brown		Hawks, Brown	2023	2023	1	2023						
Hawks		Hawks	2018	2018	0	−						
Saints		Saints	2018	2018	0	−						

== Premiers ==
Year	Premiers	Runners-up	Score	Date
2019	Hawthorn	Bulldogs	13.8 (86) d. 12.7 (79)	12 October 2019
2021	St Kilda	Bulldogs	135 d. 71	4 December 2021
2022	Bulldogs	St Kilda	68 d. 58	3 September 2022
2023	Hawthorn Brown	Hawthorn Gold	133 d. 106	9 September 2023
2024	Hawthorn	Port Melbourne	11.21 (87) d. 10.12 (72)	28 July 2024
