= Graham Huggins =

President of St Kilda football club (1921-2000)

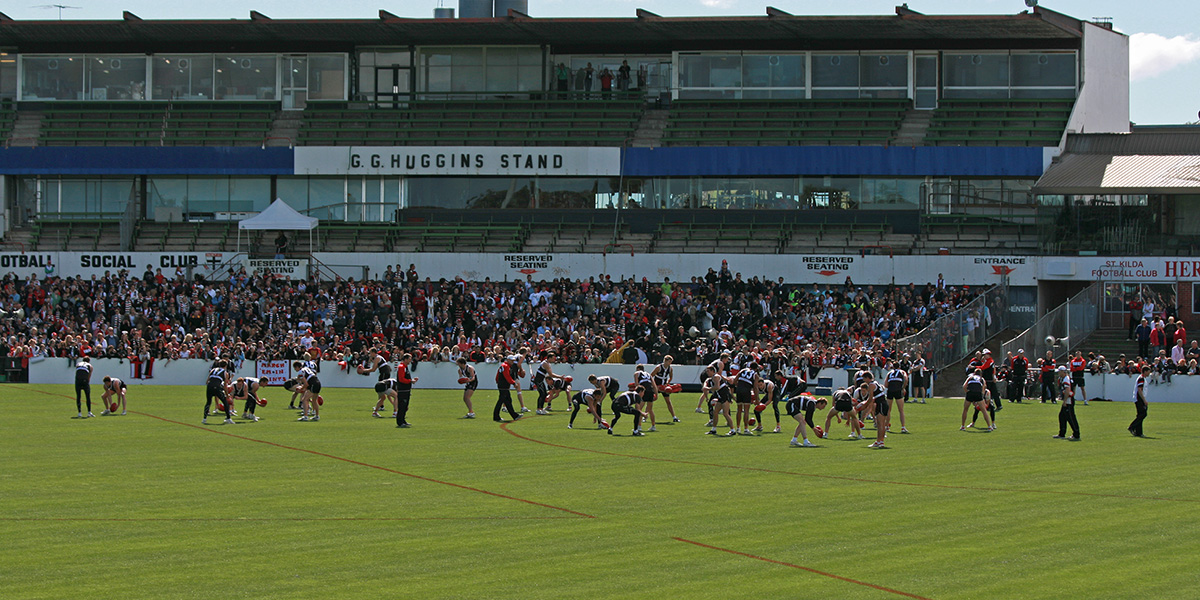
The remaining grandstand containing the social club facilities at St Kilda's training ground Moorabbin Oval is named in honour of Huggins

Graham G. Huggins (1921 – July 14, 2000) was president of the St Kilda Football Club in the Victorian Football League (now known as the Australian Football League) from 1959 to 1979 and remains the club's longest serving president.

== St Kilda presidency ==
Huggins was a Melbourne businessman and company director and assumed the presidency at St Kilda in 1959 after serving on the committee from 1954. Huggins was also vice-president of the club in 1980 and 1981.

During his time as president, Huggins oversaw the appointment of Allan Jeans as coach of the Saints. Jeans successfully guided St Kilda to the 1965, 1966 and 1971 grand finals, winning the premiership in 1966.

Along with highly regarded club secretary Ian Drake, Huggins engineered the move of the club to Moorabbin in 1965 and this netted immediate financial benefit for the Saints as well as coinciding with one of the most successful on-field periods in the club's history.

In 1976, Huggins, then VFL vice-president, was a considered a strong chance to assume the position of President of the League. He withdrew from the contest to remain with St Kilda and Allen Aylett became VFL president at the beginning of 1977.

Huggins stepped down from the St Kilda presidency in 1979, but continued on the board until 1981 at which time he retired after a quarter of a century involved in football at the highest level.

The remaining grandstand containing the social club facilities at Moorabbin Oval is named the G. G. Huggins Stand in honour of Huggins.

== Sydney Swans representation ==
In 1981 Huggins published a report concluding that there was an "untapped market in Sydney which represented an excellent opportunity for the league." The report was used by the VFL as vindication for the league's desire to establish a team in Sydney.

In 1982, Huggins moved to Sydney to represent the Sydney Swans after their move and change from South Melbourne to Sydney.
