= Carl Dilena =

Australian rules footballer

Personal information
- Full name: Carl Dilena
- Born: 17 March 1967 (age 59)
- Original team: Sturt (SANFL)
- Draft: No. 3, 1988 national draft
- Height: 179 cm (5 ft 10 in)
- Weight: 76 kg (168 lb)

Playing career^{1}
Years	Club	Games (Goals)
1989–1990	Fitzroy	23 (15)
1991–1992	North Melbourne	10 (8)
Total		33 (23)
- ^{1} Playing statistics correct to the end of 1992.

Carl Dilena (born 17 March 1967) is a former Australian rules footballer who played with Fitzroy and North Melbourne in the Victorian/Australian Football League (VFL/AFL).

== Playing career ==
Dilena started his career at South Australian National Football League (SANFL) club Sturt and was involved in a controversial incident late in the 1988 SANFL season when he was knocked unconscious from a charge by Russell Johnston. The Port Adelaide captain was suspended for five weeks and as a result missed playing in their premiership winning team.

He was selected by Fitzroy with the club's first pick, and third overall, in the 1988 VFL Draft. After appearing in the first seven rounds of the 1989 VFL season, he played just four more games for the rest of the year and another 12 in 1990.

North Melbourne then secured Dilena in the 1991 Pre-season draft, with pick 15. He performed well initially and in just his second game for his new club, against Adelaide, Dilena was influential with 39 disposals, with the next best North Melbourne player having just 20 disposals. In 1992, his final season, Dilena played just twice, but put in another good effort against Adelaide when he kicked a career high four goals.

== Executive career ==
Dilena joined the North Melbourne Football Club board in 2008, and he was CEO from 2013 to 2019.

In October 2022, Dilena joined the St Kilda Football Club board as Chief Operating Officer. Upon Simon Lethlean's departure in January 2024, Dilena became acting CEO. Dilena was formally appointed CEO on 9 May 2024.

== Personal life ==
Dilena was also a talented junior cricketer, representing South Australia at the 1981/82 National Under 16 Australian Cricket Championships.

== Sources ==
- South Australian Cricket Association (S.A.C.A.) Annual Report 1981-82, S.A.C.A.: Adelaide.
