= Greg Burns (Australian rules footballer) =

Australian rules footballer

Personal information
- Born: 21 February 1958 (age 68)
- Original team: North Ballarat (BFL)
- Height: 178 cm (5 ft 10 in)
- Weight: 76 kg (168 lb)

Playing career^{1}
Years	Club	Games (Goals)
1978–1989	St Kilda	169 (114)
- ^{1} Playing statistics correct to the end of 1989.

Career highlights
- St Kilda FC Best & Fairest: Trevor Barker Award 1984, 1986; St Kilda FC Hall of Fame Inductee

Greg D. Burns (born 21 February 1958) is a former Australian rules footballer who played for St Kilda.

Burns was a tough and uncompromising centreman, who won St Kilda best and fairest twice, in 1984 and again in 1986. He was often one of the few shining lights for the Saints during the club's run of four wooden spoons from 1983 until 1986. His fierce determination to win the ball out of the middle became a trademark and would often stand out in physical contests among opposition of a higher calibre, especially in games at Moorabbin among the often muddy and wet conditions.

He made only one appearance—his first in the VFL—in 1978, before playing a further 59 games over the next four years for just 12 wins. In 1983, Burns established himself as the Saints best midfielder, racking up 20 games and 492 possessions (average of 24.6 per game)—an increase on his 261 possessions the season before. Only in 1987, aged 29, did Burns collect more touches of the football in his career during a 21-game, 506 disposals season. He utilised the handball more in this, his tenth seasons in the VFL, handpassing it 202 times, 68 more than any other season.

Burns, who shunned the limelight to bigger names at St Kilda, retired in 1989. It coincided with good teammate and fellow Ballarat product, Geoff Cunningham's retirement, the pair starting and ending their careers at St Kilda during the same time. Burns had been a harness racing driver in the 1970s.

== Sources ==
- Greg Burns's playing statistics from AFL Tables
- Piesse, Ken (2011). Great Australian Football Stories. Melbourne: Five Mile Press. ISBN 978-1-74346-757-2.
- Bio at Saints.com.au
