= Billy Shaw (Australian footballer) =

Australian rules footballer

Billy H. Shaw
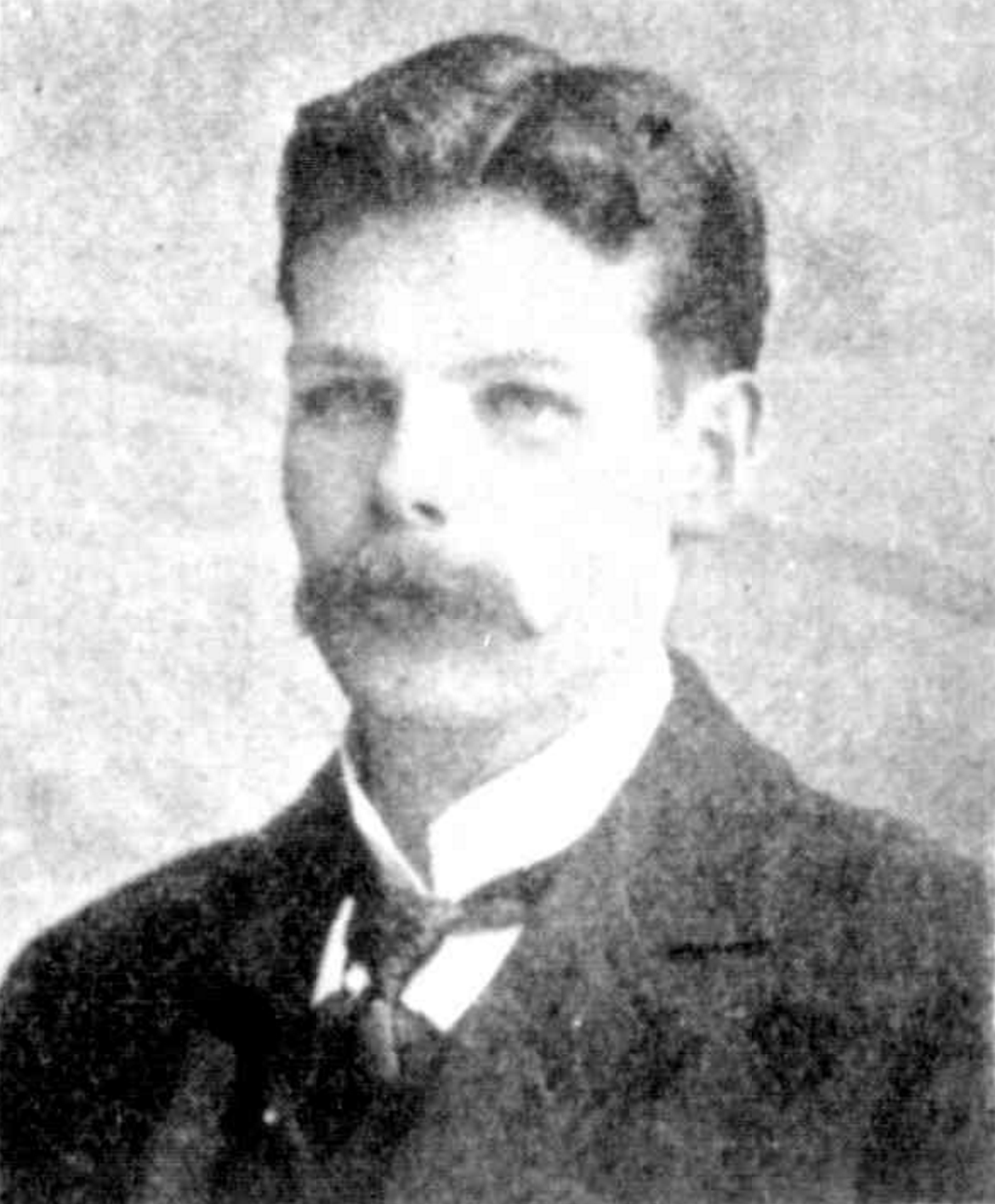
- Shaw in 1899

Personal information
- Full name: William Hugh Shaw
- Born: 3 November 1872; St Kilda, Victoria
- Died: 2 February 1938 (aged 65); Brighton, Victoria
- Original team: St Kilda (VFA)
- Position: Wing

Playing career^{1}
Years	Club	Games (Goals)
1897–1899	St Kilda	29 (1)
1901	Melbourne	1 (0)
Total		30 (1)
- ^{1} Playing statistics correct to the end of 1901.

William Hugh Shaw (3 November 1872 – 2 February 1938) was an Australian rules footballer who played with St Kilda and Melbourne in the Victorian Football League (VFL).

Shaw was already a 100-game veteran for St Kilda when he made his VFL debut, having played for the club in the Victorian Football Association. He was St Kilda's inaugural VFL captain, leading the club in 1897 and 1898. A wingman, he experienced losses in each of his 29 league games for St Kilda and even lost the only fixture he played with Melbourne, which he joined in 1901.
