= Matt Finnis =

Australian sports executive

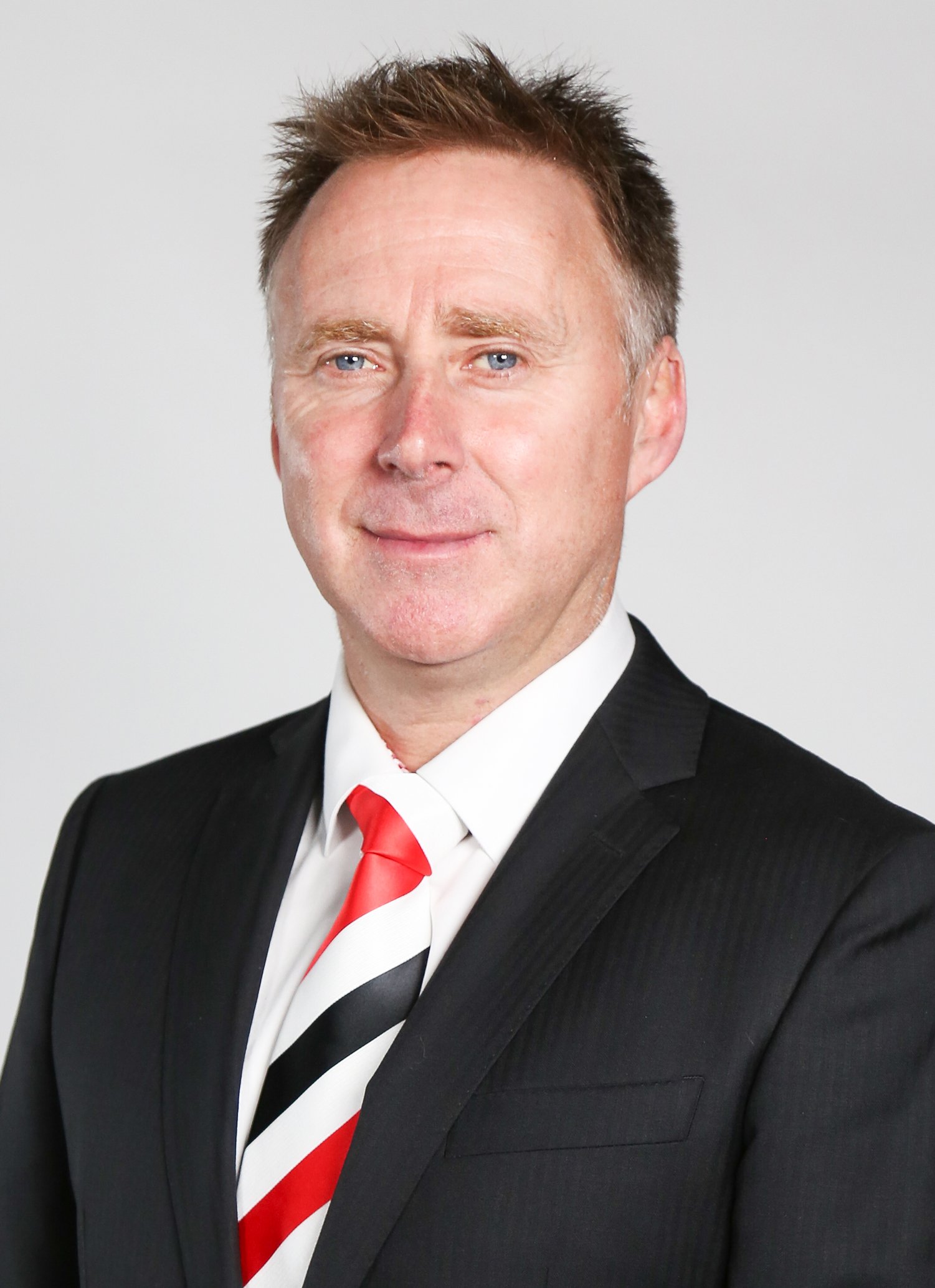
- Matt Finnis
- Born: Matthew Finnis
- Occupation: Chief Executive Officer of St Kilda Football Club

Matt Finnis is the former chief executive officer of the St Kilda Football Club.

He was appointed chief executive officer in March 2014, succeeding interim CEO Terry Dillon. He was previously the chief executive officer at the AFL Players Association.

== Career ==
Finnis was instrumental in driving an agenda which resulted in the agreement to introduce free agency to the AFL and secure recognition for the significant part AFL footballers play in the phenomenal and growing success of the code. He also represented player interests in a range of issues, including commercial rights and individual grievances, and chaired the AFLPA Agent Accreditation Board.

Prior to joining the AFL Players Association, Finnis worked as a commercial lawyer advising numerous sporting organisations, businesses, athletes and government.

He has extensive experience in supporting community causes and organisations having been chairman of Ladder – an AFL Players charitable initiative to tackle youth homelessness and a director of AFL SportsReady – the AFL industry's group training company. He is a director of Surfing Australia – the peak governing body for the sport of surfing, and has been a director and company secretary of Surf Life Saving Victoria since 2002.

Finnis was also a founding director of HeartKids Australia, a charity supporting children born with congenital heart disease.

In 2014, Finnis was charged by St Kilda's board with delivering the 'Road to 2018' roadmap, which directed the AFL team to finish top four by 2018 and win the club's second premiership. Having not met these objectives, Finnis, in 2019, unveiled a new "football strategy" to guide the club through 2022.
