= Harold Matthews =

Australian rules footballer

Personal information
- Full name: Harold Turner Matthews
- Born: 7 December 1902; Brighton, Victoria
- Died: 29 August 1986 (aged 83); Brighton, Victoria
- Original team: Brighton (VFA)
- Height: 179 cm (5 ft 10 in)
- Weight: 83 kg (183 lb)

Playing career^{1}
Years	Club	Games (Goals)
1923–1924	Brighton (VFA)	34 (0)
1925–1932	St Kilda	136 (0)
- ^{1} Playing statistics correct to the end of 1932.

Harold Turner Matthews (7 December 1902 – 29 August 1986) was an Australian rules footballer who played with St Kilda in the VFL.

A defender, Matthews was the joint winner of the St Kilda Best Player award in 1926 and won it again the following season. In 1931 he finished equal 9th in the Brownlow Medal count.
