= Gordon Dangerfield =

Australian rules footballer

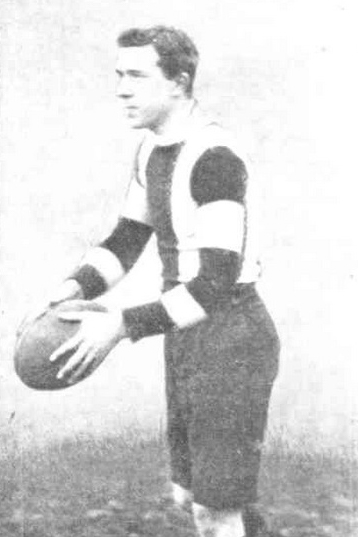
- Dangerfield in 1910

Personal information
- Full name: Gordon Charles Dangerfield
- Born: 27 September 1885; St Kilda, Victoria
- Died: 9 June 1946 (aged 60); East Melbourne, Victoria
- Original team: Brighton
- Height: 182 cm (6 ft 0 in)
- Weight: 83 kg (183 lb)
- Position: Defender

Playing career^{1}
Years	Club	Games (Goals)
1905, 1907–15, 1918–19	St Kilda	158 (16)
- ^{1} Playing statistics correct to the end of 1919.

Gordon Charles Dangerfield (27 September 1885 – 9 June 1946) was an Australian rules footballer who played for St Kilda in the Victorian Football League (VFL).

A strong marking half back, Dangerfield missed some early matches in the 1908 season as he had returned to his former club Brighton for their inaugural VFA season. He spent a total of 12 seasons at St Kilda, captaining them in 1911 and 1915. He was a centre half back in their 1913 VFL Grand Final loss to Fitzroy. In 1920, he returned to Brighton and the following season was appointed coach.
