= Jeff Sarau =

Australian rules footballer, born 1954

Personal information
- Full name: Jeffrey Raymond Sarau
- Born: 25 January 1954 (age 72)
- Original team: East Brighton
- Height: 191 cm (6 ft 3 in)
- Weight: 96 kg (212 lb)

Playing career^{1}
Years	Club	Games (Goals)
1971–1972	Sandringham (VFA)	32 (32)
1973–1983	St Kilda	226 (119)
1984–1985	West Torrens (SANFL)	35 (9)
1986–1989	Frankston (VFA)	67
- ^{1} Playing statistics correct to the end of 1983.

Career highlights
- St Kilda Best and Fairest 1975, 1977; Victorian B side representative; St Kilda Hall of Fame Inductee

Jeff Sarau (born 25 January 1954) is a former Australian rules footballer who played for St Kilda in the Victorian Football League and West Torrens Football Club in the South Australian National Football League as a ruckman.

Although at 191 centimetres, Sarau was short for a ruckman, he compensated for this by his aggressive attitude and good leap. Sarau made his debut with Victorian Football Association (VFA) club Sandringham Football Club in 1971 before transferring to St Kilda in 1973.

Sarau played for Victoria twice, won Best and Fairest Awards at St Kilda in 1975 and 1977 and became club vice-captain. After 226 games and 119 goals for St Kilda Sarau moved to West Torrens after being sacked from the vice-captaincy role in 1984. He won the West Torrens Best and Fairest in his first season and played 35 games for the Eagles before returning to Victoria to join VFA club Frankston Football Club in 1986.

Sarau was runner-up in the Liston Trophy in 1986 and was appointed Frankston captain-coach in 1987, a position he held until the end of the 1989. He played 67 games for Frankston, and finished with a win–loss record of 29–24 from his 53 games as coach of the club. He was sacked following the season, in part due to the eight match suspension he received for four striking charges in the 1989 elimination final.
