= Michael Nettlefold =

Australian rules footballer

Personal information
- Full name: Michael Colin Nettlefold
- Born: 28 July 1959 (age 67)
- Original team: Beaumaris (SESFL)
- Height: 184 cm (6 ft 0 in)
- Weight: 76 kg (168 lb)

Playing career^{1}
Years	Club	Games (Goals)
1979–1983	St Kilda	43 (13)
1983–1985	Fitzroy	31 (6)
Total		74 (19)
- ^{1} Playing statistics correct to the end of 1985.

Michael Colin Nettlefold (born 28 July 1959) is a former Australian rules footballer who played with St Kilda and Fitzroy Football Clubs in the Victorian Football League (VFL) and has moved into football management, as the chief executive officer of St Kilda before moving to the chairmanship of Vivid Sports.

Nettlefold, who spent most of his time on the wing and at half forward, was a prolific handballer. He was offloaded to Fitzroy during the 1983 VFL season due to financial pressures and appeared in two finals in 1983.

He retired from league football at the age of just 26 to concentrate on a business career, including outdoor advertising. The son-in-law of former North Melbourne great Al Mantello, Nettlefold also had interests in private companies specialising in the health care sector, food manufacturing and retailing with one food manufacturing business being ultimately unsuccessful He took up the position of St Kilda CEO in April 2009 following the resignation of Archie Fraser.
