= Bruce Phillips (footballer) =

Australian rules footballer (1929–2014)

Personal information
- Full name: Bruce Osborne Phillips
- Born: 2 May 1929
- Died: 18 October 2014 (aged 85)
- Original team: Camden
- Height: 188 cm (6 ft 2 in)
- Weight: 83 kg (183 lb)

Playing career^{1}
Years	Club	Games (Goals)
1947–1955	St Kilda	115 (42)
- ^{1} Playing statistics correct to the end of 1955.

Bruce Osborne Phillips (2 May 1929 – 18 October 2014) was an Australian rules footballer who played with St Kilda in the Victorian Football League.

A fullback, Phillips won St Kilda's best and fairest award in 1950 and finished equal third in the Brownlow Medal count that year.

Phillips, who was a VFL representative in interstate football, played 115 games for St Kilda before a knee injury ended his career.

In 2008 Phillips was inducted into St Kilda's Hall of Fame. He died aged 85 in 2014.
