= Keith Drinan =

Australian rules footballer, born 1924

Personal information
- Born: 13 November 1924
- Died: 10 August 2004 (aged 79)
- Original team: Balaclava CYMS (CYMSFA)
- Height: 183 cm (6 ft 0 in)
- Weight: 82 kg (181 lb)

Playing career^{1}
Years	Club	Games (Goals)
1946–1957	St Kilda	135 (0)
- ^{1} Playing statistics correct to the end of 1957.

Career highlights
- St Kilda Best and Fairest 1953, 1956; Victorian state representative 8 times; St Kilda captain 1951–1953, 1956–1957

Keith Francis James Drinan (13 November 1924 – 10 August 2004) was an Australian rules footballer in the VFL.

Drinan, who served with the Royal Australian Navy during the war, played for St Kilda initially as half-back flank then centre half-back before establishing himself as a great full back. Won the club's Best and fairest twice and was captain for a total of five years (Les Foote was captain-coach in between Drinan's two stints). He wore number 25 and later coached Yarraville (in 1961). His older brother Jack Drinan also played for St Kilda.

After his death, Neil Roberts said, "Keith was a tough, underrated and inspiring leader in every way, and it was a pleasure to play under him. He regularly kept the great John Coleman to less than two goals a game."
