= Stuart Trott =

Australian rules footballer, born 1948

Personal information
- Full name: Stuart Trott
- Born: 25 April 1948 (age 78)
- Original team: Frankston Bombers
- Height: 177 cm (5 ft 10 in)
- Weight: 76 kg (168 lb)

Playing career^{1}
Years	Club	Games (Goals)
1967–1974	St Kilda	159 (69)
1975–1976	Hawthorn	41 (17)
Total		200 (86)
- ^{1} Playing statistics correct to the end of 1976.

Stuart Trott (born 25 April 1948) is a former Australian rules footballer in the Victorian Football League.

He came from Frankston originally and is the great-grandson of 1896 Test cricket captain Harry Trott.

Trott played with St Kilda from 1967 to 1974 (159 games) and later Hawthorn 1975 to 1977 (41 games). He played on the wing.

Trott played in two VFL grand finals, but never in a premiership side, he was in the 1971 with St Kilda and the 1975 with Hawthorn.

He was inducted into St Kilda's Hall of Fame in April 2016.
