= Clarrie Vontom =

Australian rules footballer (1914–2000)

Personal information
- Full name: Clarence Herbert Vontom
- Born: 10 June 1914; Richmond, Victoria
- Died: 14 October 2000 (aged 86)
- Original team: Collegians
- Height: 171 cm (5 ft 7 in)
- Weight: 71 kg (157 lb)

Playing career^{1}
Years	Club	Games (Goals)
1939–1945	St Kilda	86 (78)
- ^{1} Playing statistics correct to the end of 1945.

Clarence Herbert Vontom (10 June 1914 – 14 October 2000) was an Australian rules footballer who played with St Kilda in the Victorian Football League (VFL).

Vontom was educated at Wesley College and captained Collegians in the Victorian Amateur Football Association. A rover, he was already 24 when he began his VFL career. In 1939, his first season at St Kilda, Vontom spent much of his time in the forward pocket and was his club's third leading goal-kicker with 28 goals. When Frank Kelly was called away on war service, early in the 1944 season, Vontom took over as captain and remained in charge the following year. He didn't play senior football in 1946, then made his way to Brighton.
