= Harold Bray =

Australian rules footballer (1920–1999)

Personal information
- Full name: Harold Cecil Bray
- Born: 5 July 1920; Melbourne, Victoria
- Died: 27 June 1999 (aged 78)
- Original team: Prahran (VFA)
- Height: 178 cm (5 ft 10 in)
- Weight: 76 kg (168 lb)

Playing career^{1}
Years	Club	Games (Goals)
1941–1952	St Kilda	156 (15)
- ^{1} Playing statistics correct to the end of 1952.

Harold Cecil Bray (5 July 1920 – 27 June 1999) was an Australian rules footballer who played with St Kilda in the Victorian Football League (VFL).

Bray was recruited to the Saints from Prahran in 1941 and for the next ten years served the club with distinction as a pacy centreman.

He fell two votes shy of winning the Brownlow Medal in his final season, 1952, after finishing third in 1949 and second in 1947.

He did, however, twice win St.Kilda's best and fairest award in 1945 and 1947 and also represented the VFL in interstate football.

== Personal life ==
Bray served as a private in the Australian Army during the Second World War.
