= Vic Barwick =

Australian rules footballer

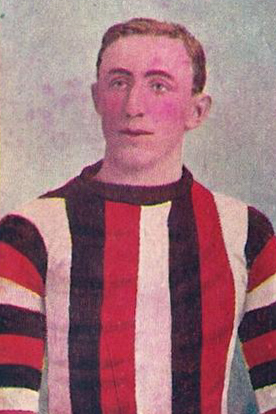
- Cigarette card of Barwick in 1905

Personal information
- Full name: Victor Albert Ernest Joseph Barwick
- Born: 17 June 1879; Oatlands, Tasmania
- Died: 20 December 1963 (aged 84); Brighton East, Victoria
- Original team: Linton / Union
- Height: 177 cm (5 ft 10 in)
- Weight: 81 kg (179 lb)
- Position: Rover

Playing career^{1}
Years	Club	Games (Goals)
1903–09, 1913	St Kilda	105 (66)
- ^{1} Playing statistics correct to the end of 1913.

Victor Albert Ernest Joseph Barwick (17 June 1879 – 20 December 1963) was an Australian rules footballer who played for St Kilda in the Victorian Football League (VFL).

== Football ==
Barwick began his early football career in the Tasmanian town of Queenstown and was noticed for the quality of his play in 1900 in a match against the visiting Fitzroy team from Victoria. Within a few years he ventured to the mainland and in 1903 joined St Kilda. He made his debut in the round six match versus Melbourne.

A strongly built rover, he was good enough to represent the VFL against Western Australia in 1904 and topped St Kilda's goal-kicking in 1909 with 16 goals. Barwick also was club captain for both the 1905 and 1909 seasons. Although he would return to St Kilda briefly in 1913, Barwick finished his career at Brighton in the Victorian Football Association.

He was one of the earlier Tasmanian players to have made a mark in the Victorian Football League and in 2005 he was inducted into his state's Football Hall of Fame.
