= Bill Cubbins =

Australian rules footballer

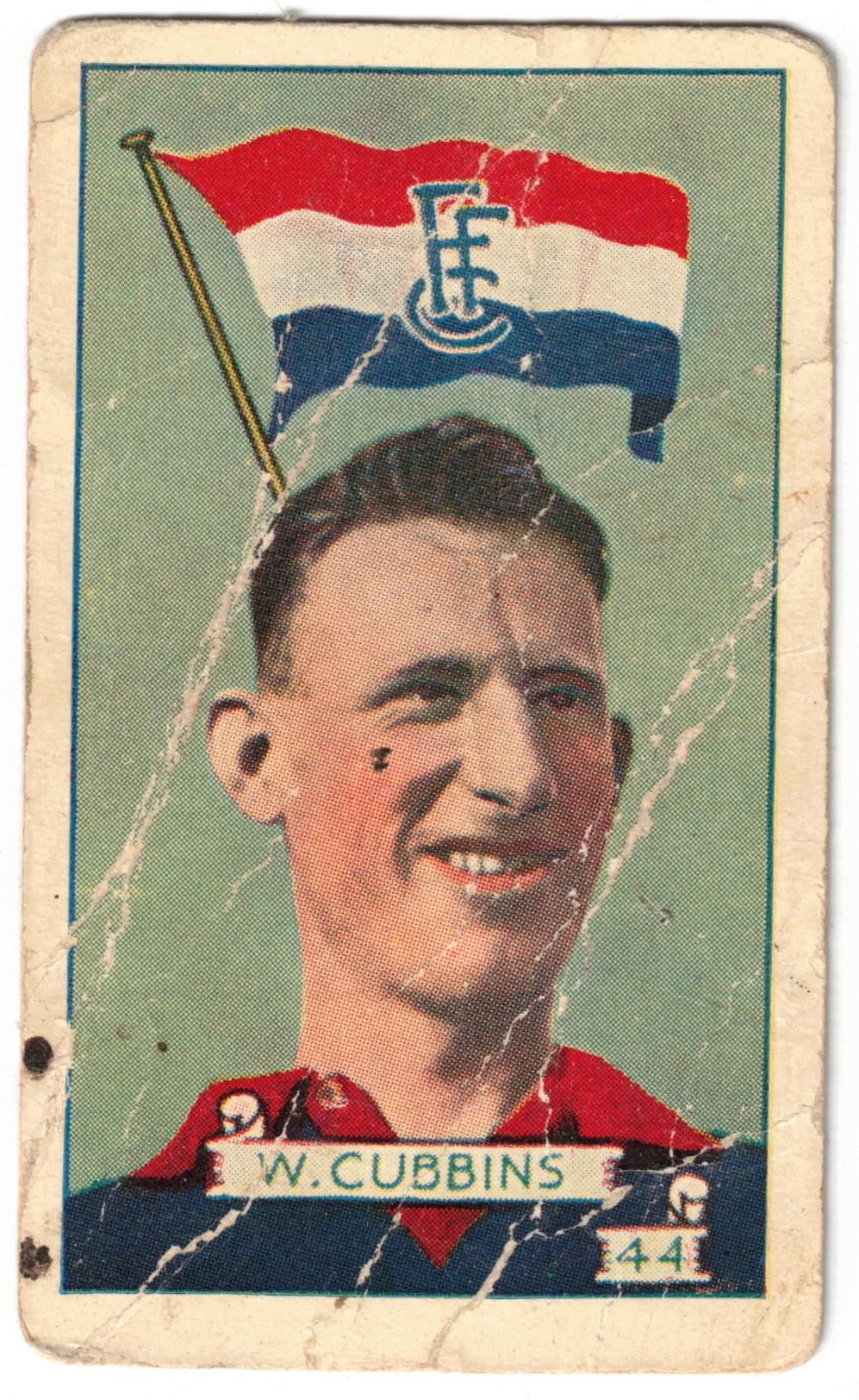

Personal information
- Full name: William Tennyson Cubbins
- Born: 4 May 1899; St Kilda, Victoria
- Died: 3 January 1968 (aged 68); Moorabbin, Victoria
- Original team: South St Kilda

Playing career^{1}
Years	Club	Games (Goals)
1915, 1919–26, 1928–30	St Kilda	149 (42)
1931–32, 1934	Footscray	33 (0)
Total		182 (42)

Coaching career
Years	Club	Games (W–L–D)
1930	St Kilda	18 (8–10–0)
1931–33	Footscray	54 (32–22–0)
Total		72 (40–32–0)
- ^{1} Playing statistics correct to the end of 1934.

Career highlights
- Club captain 1921–22, 1925, 1929–30; St. Kilda Best & Fairest 1921, 1923, 1928–29; Victorian state representative six times; Warrnambool Premiership Captain/Coach: 1927

William Tennyson Cubbins (4 May 1899 – 3 January 1968) was an Australian rules footballer who played in the Victorian Football League (VFL).

Cubbins played with St Kilda, becoming a highly decorated full back. He won a record four club best and fairest awards (equalled by Robert Harvey).

He was captain / coach of Warrnambool in 1927 and led them to the Western District Football Association premiership.

He returned to St. Kilda in 1928.

In Round 14 of the 1920 reserves season, Cubbins kicked a reserve grade record 22 goals in St Kilda's 230 point win over West Melbourne 38.27 (255) to 3.7 (25), including 12.4 (76) of the Saints 12.6 (78) in the final quarter.

== Links ==
- Saints honour roll
- Bio at Saints.com.au
