= St Kilda Football Club =

Australian rules football club

Names
- Full name: St Kilda Football Club Limited
- Nickname(s): Saints, Sainters; Indigenous rounds: Euro-Yroke
- Former nickname(s): Seagulls, Panthers
- Motto: Fortius Quo Fidelius ("Strength Through Loyalty")
- Club song: "When the Saints Go Marching In"

2026 season
- Home-and-away season: 11th
- Leading goalkicker: Liam Ryan (33 goals)
- Trevor Barker Award: Callum Wilkie

Club details
- Founded: 2 April 1873; 153 years ago
- Colours: Red White Black
- Competition: AFL: Senior men AFLW: Senior women VFL: Reserves men VBFL: Blind (mixed); VWFL: Wheelchair (mixed)
- President: Andrew Bassat
- CEO: Carl Dilena
- Coach: AFL: Ross Lyon; AFLW: Matthew Brewer; VFL: Brendon Goddard
- Captain(s): AFL: Jack Sinclair/Callum Wilkie; AFLW: Serene Watson; VFL: Billy McGee Galimberti; VWFL: Ryan Smith / Nathan Wilburn; VBFL: Shannon Jones
- Premierships: VFL/AFL (1): 1966; Reserves (3): 1942; 1943; 1961
- Ground: AFL: Docklands Stadium (56,347); AFLW: Moorabbin Oval (8,000); VFL: Moorabbin Oval (8,000); VWFL: Boroondara Sports Complex; VBFL: Action Indoor Sports Stadium
- Former grounds: Junction Oval (1897–1964)
- Moorabbin Oval (1965–1992)
- Waverley Park (1993–1999)
- Training ground: Moorabbin Oval

Uniforms
Home	Away

Other information
- Official website: saints.com.au

The St Kilda Football Club, nicknamed the Saints, is a professional Australian rules football club based in Melbourne, Victoria. The club plays in the Australian Football League (AFL), the sport's elite competition.

Founded in 1873, the club originated in the bayside Melbourne suburb of St Kilda and was originally based at Junction Oval. It was a foundation member of both the Victorian Football Association (VFA) in 1877 and the Victorian Football League in 1897, now the national Australian Football League. St Kilda has competed in seven VFL/AFL grand finals, winning only once, in 1966 against Collingwood by one point. St Kilda has also won the minor premiership three times, in 1965, 1997 and 2009.

St Kilda have developed a reputation as perennial underachievers, largely due to finishing last more than any other club (27 times), holding the league's longest active premiership drought (60 years) and fourth-longest overall, and having the second-lowest all-time win percentage among current teams (ahead of only the Gold Coast Suns).

Beyond bayside St Kilda, the club also has strong ties to the south-eastern suburb of Moorabbin, where Moorabbin Oval served as its home ground from 1965 to 1992. While the club continues to train there, it now plays its home matches at Docklands Stadium.

St Kilda fields both a women's team in the AFL Women's (AFLW) and reserves men's side in the Victorian Football League, having ended a long-term affiliation with the Sandringham Football Club in the latter competition in 2025. The Sandringham affiliation remains in place in the VFL Women's (VFLW).

== History ==
=== 1873–1915: Early years ===
On 14 March 1873, a meeting was held in Windsor to form the St Kilda Football Club. At this meeting, a provisional committee of men were elected. The formation was completed on 2 April 1873, and on 11 June 1873 another meeting was held to appoint the final committee. The club's original home ground was colloquially nicknamed the "Alpaca Paddock", which was a large fenced-off area at the St Kilda end of what is now known as Albert Park.

During its formation years, the club underwent multiple mergers. In June 1873, it merged with the South Yarra Football Club and adopted the red from their colour scheme. In 1875, the club briefly merged with University to stay financially viable. In March 1888, a decision was made to amalgamate St Kilda with nearby Prahran Football Club. St Kilda retained their colours, name and ground as well as picking up a number of Prahran players. St Kilda competed as a senior club in the VFA from 1877 to 1879, 1881 to 1882 and 1886 to 1896 before accepting an invitation into the breakaway competition, the Victorian Football League, from 1897 onwards.

Chart of yearly ladder positions for St Kilda in VFL/AFL

St Kilda were one of the eight clubs that took part in the inaugural VFL season in 1897. They made their debut in an away game against Collingwood on 8 May 1897 at Victoria Park. The club's home ground in the new league was the Junction Oval in the suburb of St Kilda, Victoria and the club's first home game was against Fitzroy.

St Kilda's early years in the VFL were not successful and, in 1899, they had the lowest score ever recorded in a VFL/AFL match, one point against Geelong. The club lost 48 consecutive games, recording their first win on 5 May 1900, against Melbourne. This match initially ended as a draw, but a protest launched by St Kilda saw the result overturned, resulting in a 1-point victory to St Kilda.

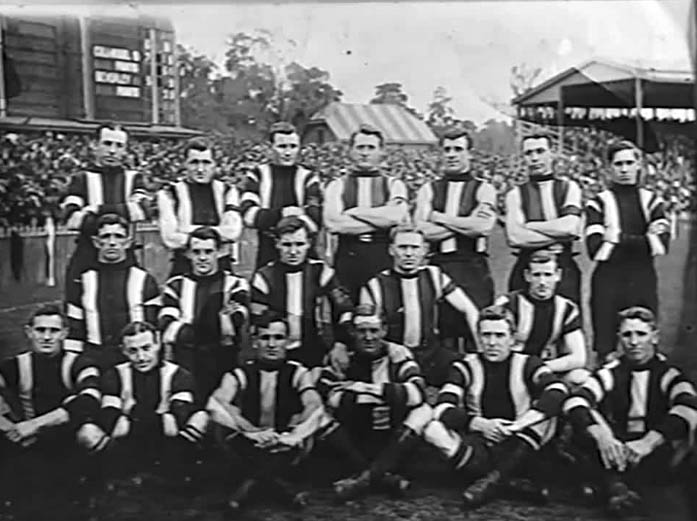
St Kilda squad for the 1913 grand final

In 1902, with 30 goals, Charlie Baker became the first St Kilda player to be the league's leading goalkicker in a home and away season.

Six successive wins at the start of the 1907 season helped St Kilda to its first finals appearance, qualifying third with nine wins and eight losses. The club was beaten by eventual premiers Carlton. The following year, the club once again qualified in third position and were again eliminated by Carlton in the semi-finals.

The 1913 season saw major improvement with the team finishing fourth, eventually being defeated in the grand final rematch by Fitzroy. Although St Kilda had won the original grand final game, owing to the finals system at the time, Fitzroy were allowed to challenge St Kilda to a rematch the following week because they had finished higher on the ladder. Fitzroy won the rematch 7.14 (56) to 5.13 (43).

=== 1916–1949: World wars and individual success ===
Owing to World War I, St Kilda went into recess in 1916 and 1917. Just prior to their recession, the club temporarily changed their official colours to include yellow in place of white. This was done to avoid association with the German Empire, who had the same colours as St Kilda at the time. The club resumed normal operation in 1918 and fared well initially, qualifying for finals and being defeated in the semi-finals. However, the following years saw St Kilda consistently struggle with poor form.

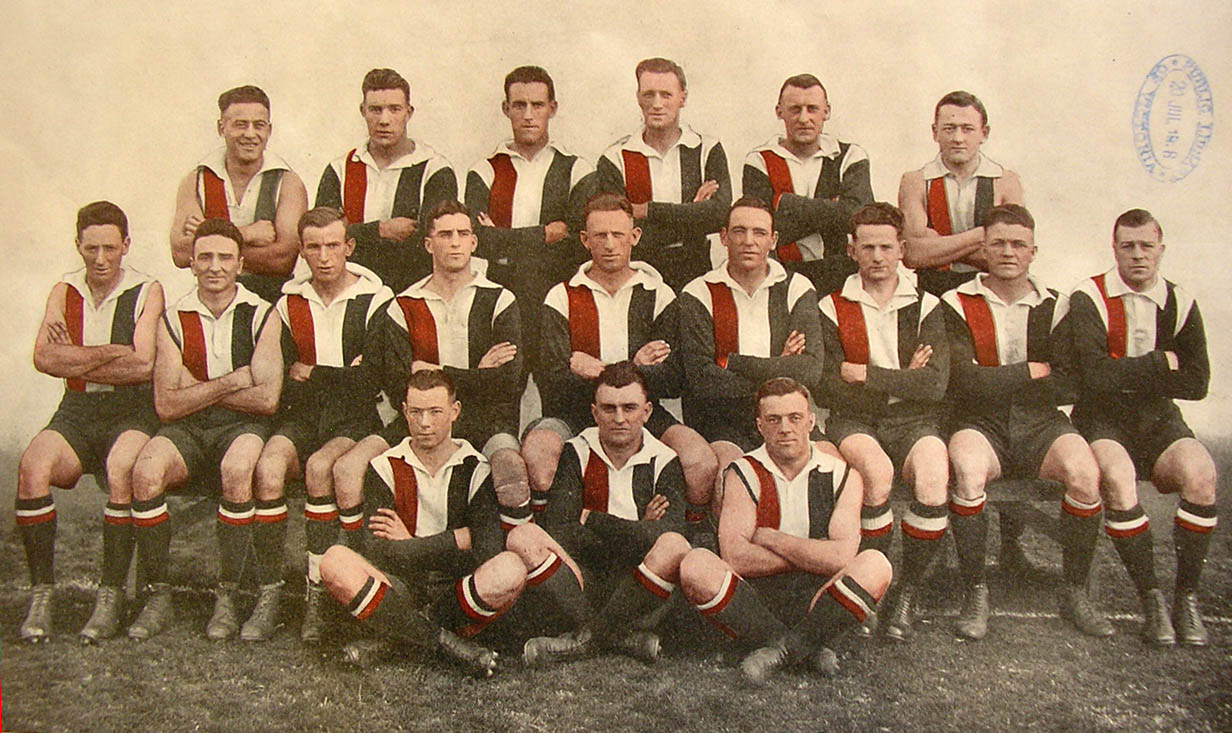
The 1928 team

The club qualified for finals once between 1919 and 1938, although during this time period Colin Watson became the first St Kilda player to win the league's highest individual award, winning the 1925 Brownlow Medal. Additionally in 1936, forward Bill Mohr kicked 101 goals, winning the leading goalkicker award and becoming the first St Kilda player to kick 100 goals or more in a season.

The club qualified for finals in 1939, finishing the season in fourth after a record run of eight consecutive victories. The team had its first finals win since 1913, against Richmond, but were eliminated in the preliminary final by Collingwood.

St Kilda won three of the first four games early in the 1940 season and were on top of the ladder after Round 4, however, the club went on to finish second last. Despite prominent players emerging for the club such as Harold Bray, Keith Drinan, Peter Bennett and later Neil Roberts, St Kilda were rarely competitive for the duration of the 1940s.

=== 1950–1973: Failure and success ===
The 1950s were initially as uncompetitive for St Kilda as the prior decade. The club failed to make the finals for the first half of the decade, and won three wooden spoons over the period. At the end of 1955, Alan Killigrew was appointed as the club's coach. As part of Killigrew's plan to reinvigorate the club, 17 players were removed from the club's list - one of the most substantial list turnovers in VFL history. Between 1957 and 1959, St Kilda won three consecutive Brownlow Medals. The 1959 winner, Verdun Howell, tied with Bob Skilton in the Brownlow Medal count. At the time, Skilton was awarded the medal on count-back. The league later decided to award a Brownlow Medal to any player who was eligible to win who tied on the same number of votes as a winner who won on count-back – with Howell receiving the Brownlow retrospectively.

In 1958, St Kilda won the Consolation Night Series competition, a competition that was played between clubs that had failed to qualify for the premiership season finals series. St Kilda defeated Carlton 16.13 (109) to 15.11 (101).

In 1961, after finishing sixth in 1960, Allan Jeans was appointed coach. In his first season as coach, St Kilda qualified for the final four for the first time since 1939. The club lost to Footscray in the first semi-final. The club qualified for finals again in 1963, but was eliminated in the semi-finals again. In 1965, St Kilda finished the home and away season as minor premiers for the first time in the club's history. St Kilda defeated Collingwood in the second semi-final to progress into the grand final. The club finished second in the 1965 premiership season, being defeated by Essendon in the 1965 VFL Grand Final.

1966 VFL Grand Final	G	B	Total
Collingwood	10	13	73
St Kilda	10	14	74
Venue: Melbourne Cricket Ground	Crowd: 101,655

Following their successful 1965 season, St Kilda qualified for finals in consecutive years for the first time since 1907–08. The club was defeated in the second semi-final by Collingwood - however, the club defeated Essendon in the preliminary final in to qualify for the 1966 VFL Grand Final. St Kilda defeated Collingwood by a single point to win their first premiership in 68 seasons. The following year, St Kilda failed to qualify for the finals series, finishing fifth.

Despite continued finals appearances in the early 1970s, St Kilda was unable to win a second premiership - being defeated by the eventual premiers in each finals series between 1970 and 1973. During this 4-year period, St Kilda qualified for the 1971 VFL Grand Final. Despite leading by 20 points at the beginning of the last quarter, they were defeated by Hawthorn by 7 points.

=== 1974–1990: Decline ===
In 1974, St Kilda declined to the lower half of the ladder for the first time since the 1950s, finishing tenth. Allan Jeans retired from coaching two years later after 16 seasons coaching St Kilda, citing burnout as his reason for retirement.

After Lindsay Fox was appointed club president in 1979, the club's outstanding debt of $1.45 million was addressed. Many senior players and Allan Jeans accepted a deal to be paid 22.5 cents for each dollar they were owed. Additionally, non-football creditors received 7.5 cents for each dollar owed. The club was ultimately able to settle with its creditors for $195,000. Despite these efforts, continuing financial pressures and defeats saw the club remain in the bottom three for every season between 1979 and 1986.

In 1987, Tony Lockett won the league's Coleman Medal for leading goalkicker in the home-and-away season, the fourth St Kilda player to achieve this. Lockett also became the seventh St Kilda player to win the Brownlow Medal. He remains the only person in league history to win both the league's best and fairest Brownlow Medal and the Coleman Medal in the same season.

=== 1990–1999: AFL era ===
The league was officially renamed the Australian Football League prior to the start of the 1990 premiership season.

A competitive 1991 AFL season saw St Kilda qualify for a finals series for the first time since 1973, qualifying fourth at the end of the home and away rounds. However, the club failed to win a final, being defeated by Geelong. St Kilda finally broke through the following year, winning its first finals series match since 1973 against Collingwood.

St Kilda won the 1996 Ansett Australia Cup competition, also known as the pre-season cup. The team defeated Carlton in the final 20.10 (130) to 10.12 (72) in front of 66,888 people at Waverley Park. Nicky Winmar became the first St Kilda player to win the Michael Tuck Medal for best player on the ground in the 1996 Ansett Australia Cup Final. Despite this success, the club failed to make the finals.

In the 1997 season, St Kilda qualified for the finals series in first position at the end of the home and away rounds with 15 wins and 7 losses, winning the second minor premiership in the club's history. St Kilda defeated Brisbane in the qualifying finals and North Melbourne in the preliminary finals to move through to the grand final. St Kilda finished second after being beaten in the 1997 AFL Grand Final by Adelaide.

The 1998 season initially appeared to be equally strong for the club. After Round 14 of the season, St Kilda was on top of the ladder in Round 14 with eleven wins and three losses and were tipped as warm favourites for the premiership. However, the team's performance declined severely, losing six of their final eight matches to from first to sixth at the conclusion of the premiership season. After qualifying for the finals in consecutive seasons, St Kilda were defeated narrowly by Sydney in the qualifying finals and then eliminated comprehensively by Melbourne in the semi-finals.

=== 2000–2011: Wooden spoon to premiership contender ===
During the early part of the decade, St Kilda struggled, winning only two matches and drawing one to finish with the wooden spoon in 2000. The following two years were similar, finishing second-last in both seasons. During this period, St Kilda recruited players such as Justin Koschitzke, Nick Riewoldt, Nick Dal Santo and Brendon Goddard who were mainstays of the team over the following decade.

In 2004, St Kilda won a club record of 10 consecutive matches from round 1 to round 10. The club returned to finals, eventually being defeated by eventual premiers Port Adelaide in a preliminary final. The following year saw a similar result, with the club being defeated in a preliminary final by Sydney.

St Kilda's 2006 AFL season saw the club finish in sixth position at the end of the home and away rounds and qualify for a third successive finals series. St Kilda were eliminated by Melbourne in the elimination finals. During this season, Robert Harvey broke the all-time games record for St Kilda when he played in his 324th premiership season match in Round 7. On 11 October 2006, Ross Lyon was appointed as the new head coach for St Kilda, replacing Grant Thomas.

After missing finals in 2007, St Kilda again qualified for the finals in 2008. A 108-point win over Essendon in the final home-and-away round saw the club take fourth position for the finals series. St Kilda were defeated by Geelong in the qualifying finals, defeated Collingwood in the semi-finals and were eliminated by the eventual premiers, Hawthorn, in the preliminary final.

St Kilda's 2009 season is considered one of the most dominant home-and-away seasons in AFL history. The club won 20 games—the best-ever home and away record for the club—as well as winning 19 games in a row before being defeated by Essendon. In Round 14, St Kilda defeated Geelong by six points, with both teams being undefeated prior to the match. The game broke multiple records, including highest-ever crowd for an AFL match at Docklands Stadium (54,444). The game was sold out two weeks in advance, causing a change in timeslot (moving from 2:10 pm to 3:10 pm) so that the Seven Network could broadcast the game live in Victoria. St Kilda eventually progressed to that year's grand final, when they were defeated by Geelong by 12 points. Following the grand final, Ross Lyon signed a three-year extension to his coaching contract until the end of the 2012 season.

The following year, St Kilda experienced a similar level of success, qualifying for the finals in third position. The club recorded their first win against Geelong in a finals match in the 2nd qualifying final and eventually qualified for the Grand Final against Collingwood. The match ended in a draw – the third drawn grand final in VFL/AFL history. St Kilda midfielder Lenny Hayes won the Norm Smith Medal for the player judged best on ground in the match, making him the first St Kilda player to ever win the medal. Owing to the draw, a second grand final match was played the following week. In the grand final replay, Collingwood won by 56 points.

In December 2010, the club was granted ownership of the Linen House Centre, a new training and administration property in the City of Frankston at Seaford valued at approximate $11 million. Following the season, the club announced a record net profit of $7.467 million for season 2010. St Kilda also achieved a new record membership for a single season and were the 2nd-most-watched team on television, rating 22,777,092 viewers across the season.

Following a loss in their 2011 elimination final, Ross Lyon left the club, despite one year remaining on his contract, to coach Fremantle. Former Sydney, Fremantle and West Coast player and Collingwood assistant coach Scott Watters was announced as Lyon's replacement in October 2011.

=== 2012–present: Post grand finals struggles and rebuild ===
The years after the departure of Ross Lyon did not prove fruitful for St Kilda. They failed to make the finals in 2012 for the first time since 2007 and continued poor performances that ultimately culminated in the club finishing last in 2014. Despite this, the 2013 season marked a historic moment for St Kilda and the Australian Football League when St Kilda hosted the first premiership match outside of Australia in New Zealand. Following the 2013 season, senior coach Scott Watters was sacked. On 14 November, former Port Adelaide director of coaching Alan Richardson was announced as new senior coach for the next three years.

Following further poor performances in the 2018 and 2019 seasons, Richardson was advised that his contract would not be renewed for 2020. As a result, he resigned from his position as senior coach. Assistant coach Brett Ratten took over as caretaker coach. After winning three of the season's last six games, Ratten was appointed permanent senior coach in September 2019. During the 2019 trade period, four high-profile players requested a trade to St Kilda and many discussions were held with other players looking to move.

In the COVID-19-shortened 2020 season, the club managed 10 of a possible 17 wins to qualify for their first finals series since 2011. During the finals campaign, St Kilda would defeat the Western Bulldogs in an elimination final by 3 points, bringing the first finals victory to the club since 2010 preliminary final against the same opponent. Richmond would later defeat St Kilda by 31 points in the semi-final, ending their campaign. In the following 2021 season, the club would decline in performance, leading to the club finishing 10th with only a 10–12 record. In the 2022 season, after starting at an impressive 8-3 record by round 11, the club would then win only three of their last 11, leading to an 11-11 record, finishing 10th once again. On October 14, 2022, senior coach Brett Ratten would be sacked by the club. Former St Kilda coach Ross Lyon would be reinstated as senior coach for the 2023 season.

In the 2023 season, Ross Lyon's first season back as coach, St Kilda would return to the finals, finishing sixth with a 13–10 record. They were defeated by Greater Western Sydney by 24 points in the elimination final. The team struggled to maintain this form over the next two seasons, finishing with sub-50% winning records, however the club's round 20, 2025 victory over Melbourne was notable for being the biggest comeback from three-quarter time in VFL/AFL football.

=== AFLW involvement ===
In 2017, following the inaugural AFL Women's (AFLW) season, St Kilda was among eight clubs that applied for licences to enter the competition from 2019 onwards. In September 2017, the club was announced as one of four clubs to receive a licence to join the competition in 2020.

== Club identity ==
The club's on-field nickname is the "Saints", usage of which dates back to as early as the 1870s. Many clubs' early nicknames were derived from an abbreviation or demonym of the club's suburb, but St Kilda is unique among the Australian Football League clubs in now utilising this as its official nickname. Dating back to as early as the 1890s, and to as late as the 1950s, the "Seagulls" was also in use as a nickname, but this has fallen out of use. In 1945, the club adopted the moniker "Panthers"; however, this was short-lived.

=== Guernseys ===
St Kilda's traditional and current home guernsey has three vertical panels of red, white and black on the front, with the club crest located on the left breast. The guernsey has a plain black back, white ribbing and white numbers. This design, with occasional minor changes, has been worn by the club since 1953. As of 2025 St Kilda currently has 2 clash guernseys - a red-based design similar to the 1997-2001 home guernsey and a white-based design with two sets of red, white and black stripes known as the "Candy Stripe".

==== Evolution ====
St Kilda Home Uniform Evolution
Period	Description and history	Design
1873–1885	St Kilda's original guernsey. A stylised replica was worn in 2013, as part of the club's 140th anniversary celebrations.	
1893–1909	A widened version to the stripes used in the preceding guernsey.	
1910–1914	The same guernsey top, using black shorts instead of blue.	
1915–1918	A yellow version of the guernsey, used to avoid playing in the colours of the German Empire's flag during the First World War.	
1919–22	A second yellow guernsey, sporting a K for 'Kilda'.	
1923–52	A return to the pre-war guernsey, with an additional white stripe between the Red and Black stripes.	
1953–96; 2002–present	A "vest" type guernsey, with the tricolour red, white and black stripes.	
1997–2001	A stylised jumper based on the club crest. Originally worn only in 1996 pre-season games, this design was so popular that it became the home guernsey a year later. Also known as the "Hot Cross Bun" or "Crusader" guernsey	

=== Logos ===
St Kilda has used multiple different logos since it was formed in 1873. Prior to 1976, no clubs in the VFL used logos in an official capacity.

Many early club logos were printed in the same shield design frame and had each club's individual colours, name and design in them. St Kilda used a consistent design in the 1970s and 1980s, featuring a stick figure bearing a halo, holding the competition's logo. In 1989, just prior to the Victorian Football League officially becoming the Australian Football League, the club used a logo with a red white and black vertically striped design with the goal and behind posts on it, with a stick figure attempting a mark on it with a halo above its head, with the league logo and the club crest on top of either behind post. The Victorian Football League logo was replaced with the Australian Football League logo when the competition changed its name in 1990.

The St Kilda Football Club crest first appeared officially on the jumper in 1933, after existing at the club for quite some time beforehand in basic design form. The crest became an iconic feature of the club's jumper – a well-known and recognisable symbol of the club. The crest also includes the club's motto, Fortius Quo Fidelius, which is usually translated as "Strength through Loyalty". As with the nickname "Saints", the club crest has no religious associations. A logo change before the start of the 1995 season saw the club make the decision to use the official club crest as the club's official logo in the league. The club changed their logo at the end of the 2024 season to a more modern update of the 1995 logo, this new logo removed the club's motto "Fortius Quo Fidelius".

=== Club song ===
The club song is an adaption of "When The Saints Go Marching In". The song was recorded in 1972 by the Fable Singers and released as a single. The song was recorded with all copyright and royalty agreements in place, and the Australian Football League has permission to broadcast it publicly at each St Kilda match. Prior to 1965, when St Kilda played at the Junction Oval, the club's song was an adaptation of "I Do Like To Be Beside The Seaside".

=== Home grounds ===
==== Junction Oval: 1897–1964 ====
St Kilda's first home ground in the Victorian Football League was Junction Oval. The club used this ground until 1964, when it moved to Moorabbin Oval. The oval was formerly known as the St Kilda Cricket Ground and was originally established as the home of the St Kilda Cricket Club in 1856.

By the late 1950s, the St Kilda Football Club sought to move its playing base away from Junction Oval as it wanted to operate its own venue rather than continue being a tenant of another club. In 1959, the club made enquiries about a lease to play at and develop Elsternwick Park in the neighbouring suburb of Elsternwick, but no deal was signed.

During 2014, St Kilda became involved in discussions with the Victorian government to return as a co-tenant at Junction Oval alongside Cricket Victoria. As part of the proposals, St Kilda would utilise the oval as a training and administrative base, with the site to receive a second oval to accommodate the club. This proposal was later rejected by the Victorian government, and Junction Oval was converted into a full-time cricket venue as of 2015.

==== Moorabbin Oval: 1965–1992 ====
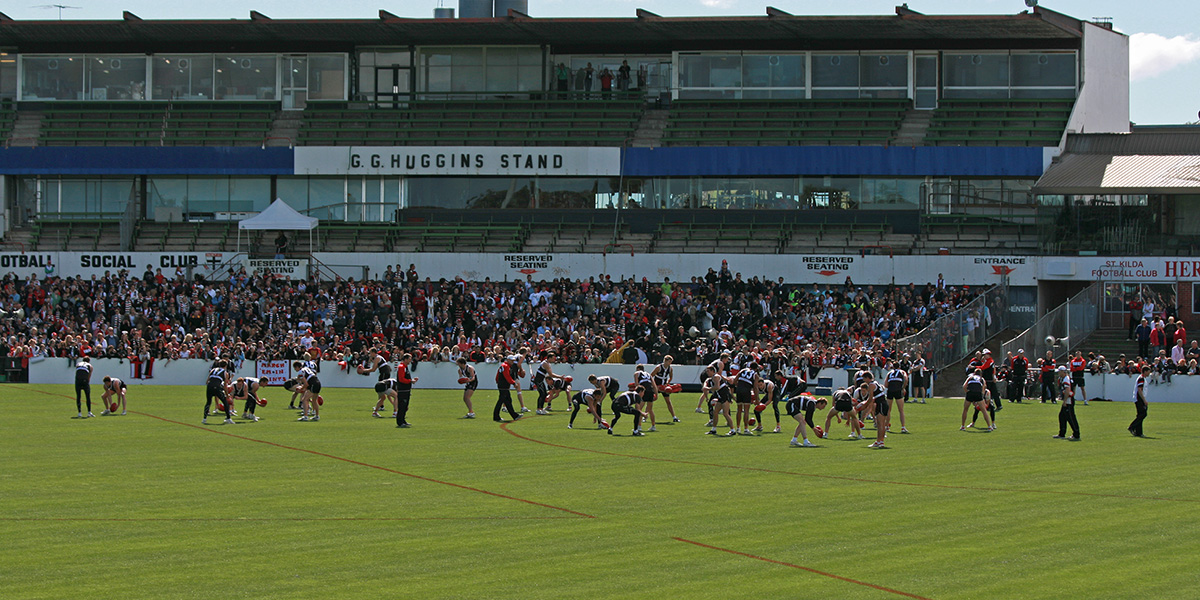
Players training in front of the G. G. Huggins Stand (demolished in 2017) before the 2009 AFL Grand Final

Moorabbin Oval has been St Kilda's training and administrative base since 1965, excluding an 8-year period between end of 2010 and 2018.

In March 1964, the club arranged a deal to move its playing, training and administrative base to Moorabbin Oval on Linton Street, Moorabbin, with all home games at the new venue starting from the 1965 season. The club signed a lease agreement in August 1964, giving the club access to all Moorabbin Oval facilities for 75 years provided it completed required works at the ground to establish a social club, training facilities and spectator seating on the site in time for the 1965 premiership season. The club had to invest a set amount, combined with funds from the local council, and complete the required works by a deadline date to ensure the agreement was ratified and the purchase was complete. Loans provided to St Kilda by the council were to be repaid over the subsequent lease period.

Following the club's move away from Moorabbin Oval as a venue for playing games, it was retained as an administrative and training facility for the club. In 2007, the relationship between the club and the City of Kingston, which governs the suburb of Moorabbin, deteriorated. As a result, St Kilda announced that it would move its primary administrative and training base away from Moorabbin. After the 2010 season, the club temporarily moved to a new facility built at Belvedere Park in Seaford. During this time, the club continued to manage Moorabbin Oval, using it as a retail, museum, entertainment and occasional training venue.

In 2018, St Kilda returned to using Moorabbin Oval as their primary administrative and training facility, as part of a two-stage redevelopment deal, costing approximately 30 million dollars. Moorabbin Oval also serves as the primary home ground for the Sandringham Dragons and the Southern Football League as well as being the administrative centre for football development in the south-east.

==== Waverley Park: 1993–1999 ====
Waverley Park was opened by the Victorian Football League in 1970 under the name "VFL Park". The ground was constructed by the league, for a variety of reasons, with the primary reason being that the ground would be owned by the VFL. As the majority of teams in the competition at the time did not have control over their home grounds, they were unable to exercise control over various aspects, such as ground drainage and ticket prices.

Since the 1960s, the Australian Football League had been embarked on a strategy of ground rationalisation. During the 1990s, as part of this strategy, St Kilda opted to take a deal to move home games to Waverley Park from 1993 and renovate the ageing Moorabbin Oval for training, administration and social club purposes. The club voted in favour of the move in a weighted vote of members in July 1992. The club received $430,000 upfront and $120,000 per year for three years from the Australian Football League's grounds rationalisation funds, which helped to clear some of the club's debt.

In 1999, the Australian Football League announced that it would not schedule any further matches at Waverley Park and that the stadium would be sold to pay for the under-construction Docklands Stadium.

==== Docklands Stadium: 2000–present ====
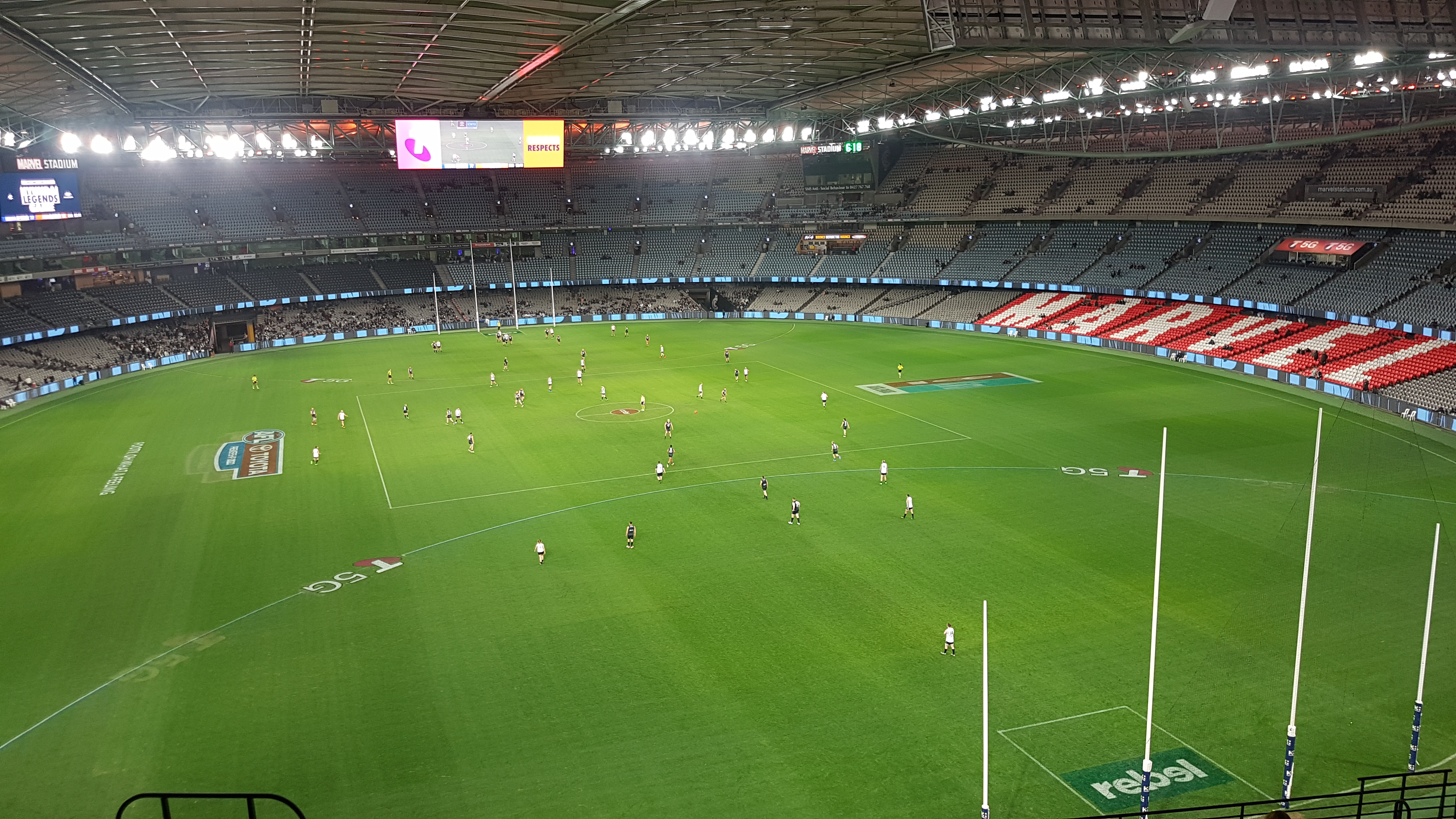
St Kilda plays its home games at Docklands Stadium, located in Melbourne's Docklands area

In 2000, St Kilda moved to a new playing home at Docklands Stadium following the discontinuation of Waverley Park as a scheduled ground.

Docklands Stadium was conceived as a multi-purpose venue to be used for Australian rules football, soccer, rugby and other general entertainment events. The AFL sought to replace Waverley Park, which would have been nearly 30 years old in 2000. The decision to build a new stadium was supported by the AFL due to issues regarding accessibility and Waverley Park, with the league stating there would be no improvement to the situation if upgrades were made to the stadium, and any upgrades would result in little financial return. The stadium was designated to be in the Docklands region of Melbourne, behind Southern Cross Station, and was designed to hold 52,000 people. The stadium cost approximately $460 million to construct. Exclusive ownership of the ground was later purchased by the AFL in October 2016.

Due to Waverley Park being disused following the construction of Docklands Stadium, St Kilda, alongside fellow tenants Hawthorn, were forced to find a new home ground. As part of the initial arrangement, both clubs were planned to play a significant number of games at the stadium, however, only St Kilda would move to the ground. St Kilda set the attendance record for the ground in 2009, when 54,444 people attended a match against Geelong, a match notable for being the latest meeting between undefeated teams in VFL/AFL history. Other former club players also hold records at the venue, with Lenny Hayes holding the record for most games played at the venue, and Nick Riewoldt holding the record for most goals kicked. To date, St Kilda has played the most AFL matches of any AFL team at Docklands Stadium, and has won the most matches of any AFL team at the ground.

During the 2021 and 2022 AFL seasons, St Kilda played one home game a year at Cazalys Stadium. Beginning with the 2023 AFL season, St Kilda have played one home game a year at the Melbourne Cricket Ground, with their remaining 10 home games played at Docklands Stadium.

==== Additional facilities ====
St Kilda's primary administrative and training base from late 2010 until 2018 was the Linen House Centre at Belvedere Park in Seaford. The creation of the base came about due to disagreements between St Kilda and the City of Kingston's council regarding proposed upgrades to their Moorabbin facilities, which included the implementation of 80 poker machines. The club subsequently negotiated a deal with the neighbouring City of Frankston to develop Frankston Park into its new training base. However, when proposed costs blew out by $5 million, a new agreement was formed between the two entities. In this new deal, the club would develop Belvedere Park in conjunction with the Frankston City Council, the Victorian state government and the Australian Football League. The cost of developing the facilities was valued at approximately $11 million. The centre received its name as part of a naming rights sponsorship deal with Linen House.

The club signed a lease on the facility until 2059. The club, however, chose to relocate back to Moorabbin Oval as its primary administrative and training base by 2018. As a result, in December 2020, St Kilda made a proposal to the Frankston City Council to repurpose the facility as a centre to be used by the wider Frankston community.

== Playing squad ==
=== Current AFL squad ===
St Kilda Football Club · AFL personnel
Playing list		Inactive list	Coaching staff
1 Jack Higgins; 2 Marcus Windhager; 3 Jack Silvagni; 4 Lance Collard; 5 Tobie Travaglia; 6 Jack Macrae; 7 Nasiah Wanganeen-Milera; 8 Bradley Hill; 9 Sam Flanders; 10 Mitch Owens; 11 Hunter Clark; 12 Max King; 14 Liam Stocker; 21 Tom De Koning; 22 Darcy Wilson; 23 Liam Henry; 24 Angus Hastie; 25 Mattaes Phillipou; 26 Alix Tauru	28 James Barrat; 30 Alex Dodson; 31 Liam Ryan; 32 Mason Wood; 34 Hugo Garcia; 35 Jack Sinclair (c); 36 Charlie Banfield; 37 Kye Fincher; 38 Hugh Boxshall; 39 Campbell Lake*; 40 Max Hall*; 42 Kobe McDonald*; 43 Cooper Sharman; 44 Callum Wilkie (c); 45 Liam O'Connell; 46 Eamonn Armstrong*; 47 Anthony Caminiti; Sam Marshall; Jake Stringer; Max Ramsden		Senior coach: Ross Lyon; Assistant coaches: Jimmy Allan (back line); Robert Harvey (midfield); Brendon Bolton (forward line); Oscar McInerney (ruck); Brendon Goddard (development); Dylan Shiel (development); Legend: (c) captain; * rookie; Updated: 16 November 2026; Sources: Players, coaches

== Corporate ==
=== Administrative board ===
- President: Andrew Bassat
- Vice president: Russell Caplan
- Chief executive officer: Matt Finnis
- Director: Dean Anderson
- Director: Jennifer Douglas
- Director: Paul Kirk
- Director: Jack Rush
- Director: Danni Roche
- Director: Adam Hilton

=== Sponsors ===
Principal partners

- CMC Markets
- Chery Motor

Major partners

- Fiji
- RSEA Safety
- LOEWE
- Westinghouse

Platinum partners

- AUCyber
- IKON Services Australia
- New Balance
- Opal

Official partners

- 1Cover
- Whatnot
- Medibank
- AGL
- Cool Ridge Water
- Gatorade
- Gumbuya World
- Jayco
- Linen House
- Love The Game
- Melbourne Airport
- Miller
- Moorabbin Airport
- Moose Toys
- OMF
- Pepsi Max
- Podium
- Rio Sound & Vision

Official Suppliers

- Dominance Guardian Services
- Elastoplast
- Hoyts
- New Era
- Total Waste Solutions

Apparel sponsors

- Puma (1997–2001)
- Sekem (2002–2003)
- Piping Hot (2003–2006)
- Skins (2007)
- ISC (2008–2016, 2020)
- BLK (2017–2019)
- New Balance (2021–present)

== Supporters ==
St Kilda has the most geographically concentrated supporter base of all the Melbourne-based AFL clubs; St Kilda has historically had a large fanbase around the Bayside suburbs of Melbourne, such as St Kilda, with one in five AFL club members in the region being a St Kilda member. The club also has strong support in the south-east regions of Melbourne.

Politically, a poll of the club's supporter base indicated a small first party voting preference (39.7%) for the Coalition over the Labor Party (36.9%). The suburb of St Kilda has a significant Jewish community and the club has a strong following from this community.

=== Number-one ticket holders ===
Notable St Kilda supporters who have also been the club's number-one ticket holders include:

- Eric Bana – actor and comedian
- Lindsay Fox – former club president and St Kilda thirds player
- Elle MacPherson – model and actress
- John Moran – former St Kilda reserves player
- Mark Dreyfus – Attorney-General of Australia

=== Membership and attendance ===
Membership & attendance
Year	Membership		Ladder position		Home crowds		
Year	AFL audited	Change	Ladder position		Average	Rank	Change
Year	AFL audited	Change	Minor round	Finals	Average	Rank	Change
1984	4,930	N/A	12th	–	17,185	10 / 12	▼3,004
1985	5,708	▲778	12th	–	15,489	10 / 12	▼1,696
1986	4,321	▼1,387	12th	–	15,214	12 / 12	▼275
1987	3,924	▼397	10th	–	18,069	10 / 14	▲2,855
1988	5,799	▲1,875	14th	–	19,499	8 / 14	▲1,430
1989	8,360	▲2,561	12th	–	20,483	7 / 14	▲984
1990	11,363	▲3,003	9th	–	31,520	4 / 14	▲11,037
1991	9,765	▼1,598	4th	5th	27,757	6 / 15	▼3,763
1992	11,650	▲1,885	6th	4th	32,591	6 / 15	▲4,834
1993	12,956	▲1,306	12th	–	28,442	8 / 15	▼4,149
1994	12,009	▼947	13th	–	22,657	11 / 15	▼5,785
1995	8,870	▼3,139	14th	–	19,173	12 / 16	▼3,484
1996	14,375	▲5,505	10th	–	27,137	8 / 16	▲7,964
1997	16,610	▲2,235	1st	2nd	39,625	4 / 16	▲12,488
1998	23,204	▲6,594	6th	6th	37,427	7 / 16	▼2,198
1999	20,793	▼2,411	10th	–	33,182	8 / 16	▼4,245
2000	17,855	▼2,938	16th	–	24,422	14 / 16	▼8,760
2001	22,248	▲4,393	15th	–	29,850	10 / 16	▲5,428
2002	17,696	▼4,552	15th	–	26,174	14 / 16	▼3,676
2003	23,626	▲5,930	11th	–	29,218	12 / 16	▲3,044
2004	30,534	▲6,908	3rd	3rd	38,164	5 / 16	▲8,946
2005	32,043	▲1,509	4th	4th	39,897	5 / 16	▲1,733
2006	32,327	▲284	6th	8th	38,097	7 / 16	▼1,800
2007	30,394	▼1,933	9th	–	37,921	8 / 16	▼176
2008	30,063	▼331	4th	4th	40,340	8 / 16	▲2,419
2009	31,906	▲1,843	1st	2nd	45,365	4 / 16	▲5,025
2010	39,021	▲7,115	3rd	2nd	40,079	5 / 16	▼5,286
2011	39,276	▲255	6th	7th	36,345	8 / 17	▼3,734
2012	35,440	▼3,836	9th	–	32,697	9 / 18	▼3,648
2013	32,707	▼2,733	16th	–	28,965	10 / 18	▼3,732
2014	30,739	▼1,968	18th	–	23,296	14 / 18	▼5,669
2015	32,746	▲2,007	14th	–	25,928	13 / 18	▲2,632
2016	38,009	▲5,263	9th	–	30,690	14 / 18	▲4,762
2017	42,052	▲4,043	11th	–	31,319	14 / 18	▲629
2018	46,301	▲4,249	16th	–	25,503	13 / 18	▼5,816
2019	43,038	▼3,263	14th	–	25,401	15 / 18	▼102
2020	48,588	▲5,550	6th	5th	3,157 (Note: Capped stadium capacities.)	14 / 18	▼22,244
2021	55,802	▲7,286	10th	–	19,552	14 / 18	▲16,395
2022	60,172	▲4,370	10th	–	25,386	14 / 18	▲5,834
2023	60,239	▲67	6th	7th	33,045	11 / 18	▲7,659
2024	60,332	▲93	12th	–	29,257	14 / 18	▼3,788
2025	65,509	▲5,177	12th	–	31,182	15 / 18	▲1,925

== Partnerships ==
=== New Zealand partnership ===
In September 2012, St Kilda announced that they had signed a three-year partnership with the Wellington City Council to play an annual match in New Zealand on Anzac Day (25 April) at Westpac Stadium as part of the day's commemorations. As a result of the partnership, St Kilda and the Sydney Swans became the first two AFL clubs to play for premiership points outside of Australia. Although the partnership was extended by three years in 2013, a review conducted in 2015 saw the conclusion of the partnership.

In 2018, AFL New Zealand and St Kilda both expressed interest in signing a new partnership in the future with matches hosted in Auckland rather than Wellington.

=== China partnership ===
In October 2018, St Kilda signed a three-year deal to replace Gold Coast as Port Adelaide's opponents in their annual match played in China. The three-year deal was expected to earn St Kilda more than $2 million in addition to any commercial earnings. In 2019, 4.01 million people watched the match between the two clubs. Owing to the COVID-19 pandemic, the match was not played in the 2020 or 2021 seasons.

== Commemorative boards ==
=== Honour board ===
St Kilda Football Club Honour Board
Year	Position	Chairman	CEO	Coach	Captain	Best & Fairest	Leading Goalkicker	
1897	Eighth; Wooden Spoon	-	-	-	B.Shawl	-	R.Stewart; B.Ahern	6
1898	Eighth; Wooden Spoon	-	-	-	B.Shawl	-	A.Stewart	23
1899	Eighth; Wooden Spoon	-	-	-	B.Shawl	-	A.Stewart^{2}	16
1900	Eighth; Wooden Spoon	-	-	-	C.Sandford	-	G.Sutherland	13
Federation of Australia
1901	Eighth; Wooden Spoon	-	-	-	D.McCabe; J.Smith	-	C.Sandford	9
1902	Eighth; Wooden Spoon	-	-	-	J.Hogan	-	C.Baker^{✪}	30
1903	Fifth	-	-	-	B.Jackson; J.Smith	-	C.Baker^{2}	22
1904	Eighth; Wooden Spoon	G.Turner	-	-	J.Smith	-	C.Baker^{3}	30
1905	Seventh	-	-	-	V.Barwick; W.Outen	-	C.Baker^{4}	19
1906	Sixth	-	-	A.Hall	J.Smith	-	D.McNamara	23
1907	Third	-	-	-	J.Wells	-	D.McNamara^{2} J.Stewart	21
1908	Third	-	-	M.Grace	J.Wells	-	J.Stewart^{2}	28
1909	Tenth; Wooden Spoon	-	-	J.Smith	V.Barwick	-	V.Barwick	16
1910	Tenth; Wooden Spoon	-	-	-	S.Gravenall	-	A.Thomas	15
1911	Ninth	-	-	E.Drohan	G.Dangerfield	-	E.Sellars	22
1912	Eighth	-	-	-	G.Morrissey	-	E.Sellars^{2}	44
1913	Second	-	-	D.McNamara; G.Sparrow	H.Lever	-	E.Sellars^{3}	53
1914	Seventh	-	-	D.McNamara	H.Lever; D.McNamara	W.Eicke	D.McNamara^{3}	48
1915	Fourth	-	-	J.Smith	G.Dangerfield	W.Eicke^{2}	H.Moyes	32
WW1 recess
1918	Fourth	-	-	J.Smith	H.Lever	R.Cazaly	D.McNamara^{4} L.Boyd	17
1919	Seventh	-	-	W.Eicke	W.Eicke	W.Eicke^{3}	J.James	12
1920	Ninth; Wooden Spoon	-	-	G.Sparrow; C.Ricketts	R.Cazaly	W.Cameron	J.James^{2}	13
1921	Eighth	-	-	C.Ricketts	C.Ricketts; S.Williams	B.Cubbins	H.Moyes^{2}	32
1922	Seventh	-	-	D.McNamara	B.Cubbins	B.Carr	H.Moyes^{3}	23
1923	Sixth	-	-	D.McNamara	D.McNamara	B.Cubbins^{2}	H.Moyes^{4}	29
1924	Ninth; Wooden Spoon	-	-	W.Eicke	W.Eicke	C.Watson	J.James^{3}	28
1925	Sixth	F.Nelson	J.Irvine	N.Clark	B.Cubbins; B.Carr	C.Gambetta	J.Shelton	42
1926	Ninth	F.Nelson	J.Irvine	N.Clark	B.Cubbins	H.Mason; H.Matthews	J.Shelton^{2}	47
1927	Seventh	F.Nelson	J.Irvine	G.Heniz	H.Mason; G.Heniz	H.Matthews^{2}	J.Shelton^{3}	24
1928	Sixth	-	J.Irvine	G.Sparrow	H.Mason; B.Cubbins	B.Cubbins^{3}	B.Smedley	51
1929	Fourth	-	J.Irvine	G.Sparrow	B.Cubbins	H.Mason^{2}	B.Mohr	38
1930	Eighth	C.Suhr; M.Gild	J.Irvine	B.Cubbins	B.Cubbins	F.Phillips	B.Mohr^{2}	83
1931	Ninth	M.Gild	J.Irvine	C.Hardy	H.Matthews	H.Neill	B.Mohr^{3}	57
1932	Eleventh	M.Gild	J.Irvine	C.Hardy; S.King	S.King	B.Mohr	B.Mohr^{4}	68
1933	Ninth	F.Arlington-Burke	J.Lord	C.Deane	C.Deane; C.Hindson	H.Comte	B.Mohr^{5}	74
1934	Seventh	-	-	C.Watson	C.Watson	J.Davis	B.Mohr^{6}	66
1935	Fifth	-	-	D.Minogue	C.Hindson	J.Davis^{2}	B.Mohr^{7}	83
1936	Seventh	-	-	D.Minogue	J.Perkins	B.Mohr^{2}	B.Mohr^{8}^{✪}	101
1937	Sixth	-	-	D.Minogue	B.Mohr	J.Davis^{3}	B.Mohr^{9}	58
1938	Eighth	-	-	D.Minogue; A.Clarke	A.Clarke	S.Lloyd	B.Mohr^{10}	34
1939	Third	D.McNamara	-	A.Clarke	A.Clarke	R.Fountain	B.Mohr^{11}	47
1940	Eleventh	D.McNamara; E.C. Mitty	-	A.Clarke	S.Lloyd	A.Killigrew	B.Mohr^{12}	25
1941	Eleventh	E.C. Mitty	-	J.Knight	J.Knight	R.Garvin	B.Flegg	47
1942	Seventh	E.C. Mitty	-	R.Garvin	R.Garvin	K.Walker	F.Kelly	21
1943	Eleventh	E.C. Mitty	-	R.Garvin	R.Garvin	K.Walker^{2}	J.Connelly	27
1944	Ninth	E.C. Mitty	-	H.Thomas	F.Kelly; C.Vontom	R.Garvin^{2}	S.Loxton	52
1945	Twelfth; Wooden Spoon	E.C. Mitty	-	H.Thomas	C.Vontom	H.Bray	J.Hall	21
1946	Eleventh	R.Sackville	-	A.Hird	A.Hird	K.Rosewarne	S.Loxton^{2}	40
1947	Twelfth; Wooden Spoon	R.Sackville	-	A.Hird	A.Hird	H.Bray^{2}	P.Bennett	37
1948	Twelfth; Wooden Spoon	R.Sackville	-	F.Froude	H.Bray	R.Hancock	P.Bennett^{2}	32
1949	Eleventh	R.Sackville	-	F.Froude	F.Green	J.Ross	J.Mcdonald	33
1950	Ninth	R.Sackville	-	F.Froude	F.Green	B.Phillips	P.Bennett^{3}	59
1951	Tenth	R.Sackville	-	F.Green	K.Drinan	J.Ross^{2}	P.Bennett^{4}	47
1952	Twelfth; Wooden Spoon	R.Sackville	-	C.Williamson	K.Drinan	J.Ross^{3}	J.Mcdonald^{2}	31
1953	Ninth	R.Sackville	-	C.Williamson	K.Drinan	K.Drinan	P.Bennett^{5}	36
1954	Twelfth; Wooden Spoon	R.Sackville	-	L.Foote	L.Foote	L.Foote	J.Ross^{3}	34
1955	Twelfth; Wooden Spoon	R.Sackville	-	L.Foote	L.Foote	N.Roberts	J.Mcdonald^{3}	24
1956	Eleventh	-	-	A.Killigrew	K.Drinan	K.Drinan^{2}	B.Young^{✪}	56
1957	Ninth	-	-	A.Killigrew	K.Drinan	B.Gleeson^{★}	B.Young^{2}	56
1958	Eighth	J.Reilly	I.Drake	A.Killigrew	N.Roberts	N.Roberts^{2}^{★}	B.Young^{3}	56
1959	Eighth	G.Huggins	I.Drake	J.Francis	N.Roberts	V.Howell^{★}	B.Young^{4}	45
1960	Sixth	G.Huggins	I.Drake	J.Francis	N.Roberts	L.Oswald	B.Young^{5}	37
1961	Fourth	G.Huggins	I.Drake	A.Jeans	N.Roberts	L.Oswald^{2}	I.Rowland	26
1962	Sixth	G.Huggins	I.Drake	A.Jeans	N.Roberts	D.Baldock	D.Baldock	33
1963	Fourth	G.Huggins	I.Drake	A.Jeans	D.Baldock	D.Baldock^{2}	D.Baldock^{2}	36
1964	Fourth	G.Huggins	I.Drake	A.Jeans	D.Baldock	I.Stewart	D.Baldock^{3}	29
1965	Second	G.Huggins	I.Drake	A.Jeans	D.Baldock	D.Baldock^{3}	D.Baldock^{4}	44
1966 ⚑	First	G.Huggins	I.Drake	A.Jeans	D.Baldock	I.Stewart^{2}^{★}	K.Neale	55
1967	Fifth	G.Huggins	I.Drake	A.Jeans	D.Baldock	R.Smith^{★}	K.Neale^{2}	37
1968	Fourth	G.Huggins	I.Drake	A.Jeans	D.Baldock	C.Ditterich	K.Neale^{3}	32
1969	Seventh	G.Huggins	I.Drake	A.Jeans	I.Stewart	B.Murray	K.Neale^{4}	50
1970	Third	G.Huggins	I.Drake	A.Jeans	R.Smith	D.Griffiths	B.Breen	35
1971	Second	G.Huggins	I.Drake	A.Jeans	R.Smith	R.Smith^{2}	A.Davis	70
1972	Third	G.Huggins	I.Drake	A.Jeans; E.Guy	R.Smith	S.Trott	J.Stephens	53
1973	Third	G.Huggins	I.Drake	A.Jeans	S.Trott	K.Neale	A.Davis^{2}	49
1974	Tenth	G.Huggins	I.Drake	A.Jeans; E.Guy	B.Lawrence	G.Elliott	B.Duperouzel	28
1975	Sixth	G.Huggins	I.Drake	A.Jeans	B.Lawrence	J.Sarau	G.Young	53
1976	Ninth	G.Huggins	I.Drake	A.Jeans	C.Ditterich	T.Barker	G.Young^{2}	52
1977	Twelfth; Wooden Spoon	G.Huggins	I.Drake	R.Smith	C.Ditterich	J.Sarau^{2}	G.Young^{3}	58
1978	Sixth	G.Huggins	-	M.Patterson	G.Colling	G.Gellie	G.Young^{4}	70
1979	Twelfth; Wooden Spoon	L.Fox	-	M.Patterson	B.Breen	J.Dunne	G.Sidebottom	56
1980	Eleventh	L.Fox	D.Wanless	M.Patterson; A.Jesaulenko	G.Sidebottom	J.Dunne^{2}	M.Scott	48
1981	Tenth	L.Fox	D.Wanless	A.Jesaulenko	A.Jesaulenko; B.Duperouzel	T.Barker^{2}	C.Gorozidis	34
1982	Eleventh	L.Fox	I.Stewart	A.Jesaulenko	B.Duperouzel	P.Kiel	M.Scott^{2}	45
1983	Twelfth; Wooden Spoon	L.Fox	I.Stewart	T.Jewell	T.Barker	M.Crow	M.Jackson	41
1984	Twelfth; Wooden Spoon	L.Fox	I.Stewart	T.Jewell; G.Gellie	T.Barker	G.Burns	T.Lockett	77
1985	Twelfth; Wooden Spoon	L.Fox; D.Perry	I.Drake	G.Gellie	T.Barker	P.Morwood	T.Lockett^{2}	79
1986	Twelfth; Wooden Spoon	D.Perry	K.Marshall	G.Gellie	T.Barker	G.Burns^{2}	T.Lockett^{3}	60
1987	Tenth	T.Payze	K.Marshall	D.Baldock; A.Davis	D.Frawley	T.Lockett^{★}	T.Lockett^{4}^{✪}	117
1988	Fourteenth; Wooden Spoon	T.Payze	R.Watt	D.Baldock	D.Frawley	D.Frawley	N.Winmar	43
1989	Twelfth	T.Payze	R.Watt	D.Baldock	D.Frawley	N.Winmar	T.Lockett^{5}	78
Australian Football League era
1990	Ninth	T.Payze	R.Watt	K.Sheldon	D.Frawley	S.Loewe	T.Lockett^{6}	65
1991	Fifth	T.Payze	R.Watt	K.Sheldon	D.Frawley	T.Lockett^{2}	T.Lockett^{7}^{✪}	127
1992	Fourth	T.Payze	R.Watt	K.Sheldon	D.Frawley	R.Harvey	T.Lockett^{8}	132
1993	Twelfth	A.Plympton	G.Bail	K.Sheldon	D.Frawley	N.Burke	T.Lockett^{9}	53
1994	Thirteenth	A.Plympton	D.Hanly	S.Alves	D.Frawley	R.Harvey^{2}	T.Lockett^{10}	56
1995	Fourteenth	A.Plympton	D.Hanly	S.Alves	D.Frawley	N.Winmar^{2}	S.Loewe	76
1996	Tenth	A.Plympton	D.Hanly	S.Alves	N.Burke; S.Loewe	N.Burke^{2}	S.Loewe^{2}	90
1997	Second	A.Plympton	D.Hanly	S.Alves	N.Burke; S.Loewe	R.Harvey^{3}^{★}	J.Heatley	73
1998	Sixth	A.Plympton	D.Hanly	S.Alves	N.Burke; S.Loewe	R.Harvey^{4}^{★}	J.Heatley^{2}	48
1999	Tenth	A.Plympton	D.Hanly	T.Watson	N.Burke	N.Burke^{3}	B.Hall	41
2000	Sixteenth; Wooden Spoon	A.Plympton	D.Hanly	T.Watson	N.Burke	A.Thompson	P.Everitt	40
2001	Fifteenth	R.Butterss	J.Watts	M.Blight; G.Thomas	R.Harvey	P.Everitt	B.Hall	44
2002	Fifteenth	R.Butterss	B.Waldron	G.Thomas	R.Harvey	N.Riewoldt	S.Milne	50
2003	Eleventh	R.Butterss	B.Waldron	G.Thomas	A.Hamill	L.Hayes	F.Gehrig	55
2004	Third	R.Butterss	B.Waldron	G.Thomas	L.Hayes	N.Riewoldt^{2}	F.Gehrig^{2}^{✪}	103
2005	Third	R.Butterss	J.Watts	G.Thomas	N.Riewoldt	S.Baker; L.Ball	F.Gehrig^{3}^{✪}	78
2006	Eighth	R.Butterss	J.Watts; A.Fraser	G.Thomas	L.Ball	N.Riewoldt^{3}	F.Gehrig^{4}	71
2007	Ninth	R.Butterss	A.Fraser	R.Lyon	L.Ball; N.Riewoldt; L.Hayes	N.Riewoldt^{4}	F.Gehrig^{5}	59
2008	Fourth	G.Westaway	A.Fraser	R.Lyon	N.Riewoldt	S.Fisher	N.Riewoldt	65
2009	Second	G.Westaway	M.Nettlefold	R.Lyon	N.Riewoldt	N.Riewoldt^{5}	N.Riewoldt^{2}	78
2010	Second	G.Westaway	M.Nettlefold	R.Lyon	N.Riewoldt	L.Hayes^{2}	S.Milne^{2}	57
2011	Seventh	G.Westaway	M.Nettlefold	R.Lyon	N.Riewoldt	S.Fisher^{2}	S.Milne^{3}	56
2012	Ninth	G.Westaway	M.Nettlefold	S.Watters	N.Riewoldt	L.Hayes^{3}	S.Milne^{4}	56
2013	Sixteenth	G.Westaway	M.Nettlefold	S.Watters	N.Riewoldt	J.Steven	N.Riewoldt^{3}	50
2014	Eighteenth; Wooden Spoon	P.Summers	M.Finnis	A.Richardson	N.Riewoldt	N.Riewoldt^{6}	N.Riewoldt^{4}	49
2015	Fourteenth	P.Summers	M.Finnis	A.Richardson	N.Riewoldt	J.Steven^{2}	J.Bruce	50
2016	Ninth	P.Summers	M.Finnis	A.Richardson	N.Riewoldt	J.Steven^{3}	T.Membrey	44
2017	Eleventh	P.Summers	M.Finnis	A.Richardson	J.Geary	S.Ross	T.Membrey^{2}	38
2018	Sixteenth	P.Summers	M.Finnis	A.Richardson	J.Geary	J.Steven^{4}	J.Gresham	35
2019	Fourteenth	A.Bassat	M.Finnis	A.Richardson; B.Ratten	J.Geary	S.Ross^{2}	T.Membrey^{3}	44
2020	Sixth	A.Bassat	M.Finnis	B.Ratten	J.Geary	J.Steele	D.Butler	29
2021	Tenth	A.Bassat	M.Finnis	B.Ratten	J.Geary; J.Steele	J.Steele^{2}	M.King	38
2022	Tenth	A.Bassat	M.Finnis	B.Ratten	J.Steele	J.Sinclair	M.King^{2}	52
2023	Sixth	A.Bassat	C.Dilena	R.Lyon	J.Steele	J.Sinclair^{2}	J. Higgins	36
2024	Twelfth	A.Bassat	C.Dilena	R.Lyon	J.Steele	C.Wilkie	J. Higgins^{2}	36
2025	Twelfth	A.Bassat	C.Dilena	R.Lyon	J.Steele	N.Wanganeen-Milera	J. Higgins^{3}	46
2026	Twelfth	A.Bassat	C.Dilena	R.Lyon	C.Wilkie J.Sinclair	C.Wilkie^{2}	L.Ryan	33
⚑ = Premier / ★ = Brownlow Medallist / ✪ = Coleman Medallist / ^{2} = Multiple Best & Fairest or Leading Goal Kicker

=== Team of the century ===
At a special function in 2003, the St Kilda Football Club Team of the Century was announced. Darrel Baldock, who captained St Kilda's first and only premiership team—the 1966 grand final team—was named as captain; and Allan Jeans, the only premiership-winning coach of the club, was named as coach. Ian Stewart was also named a member of the AFL Team of the Century.

=== Hall of fame ===
St Kilda Football Club's Hall of Fame was established in 2003. Club identities, past or present, are selected and inducted into the hall of fame by a committee. The club has inducted 48 members into its hall of fame since its inception.

St Kilda
**Hall of Fame**
**Individuals**

**Darrel Baldock**
**Ian Stewart**
**Tony Lockett**
**Trevor Barker**
**Carl Ditterich**
**Verdun Howell**
**Nicky Winmar**
**Ross Smith**
Max Hudghton
Stuart Trott

**Neil Roberts**
**Bill Mohr**
**Dave McNamara**
**Allan Jeans**
Ian Drake
Harold Bray
Barry Breen
Jack Davis
Peter Everitt
Jim Ross

Keith Drinan
**Wels Eicke**
Danny Frawley
Graham Huggins
Stewart Loewe
Alan Morrow
Bob Murray
Kevin Neale
Stephen Milne
**Lenny Hayes**

Travis Payze
**Nathan Burke**
Greg Burns
Gary Colling
Bill Cubbins
Brian Gleeson
Daryl Griffiths
Barry Lawrence
**Robert Harvey**

Brian Mynott
Des Nisbet
Lance Oswald
Bruce Phillips
**Colin Watson**
Jeff Sarau
Ian Synman
Ken Walker
Glenn Elliott

Players listed in **bold** are inductees in the Australian Football Hall of Fame.
Players listed in **bold and italics** are legends in the Australian Football Hall of Fame.

== Achievements ==
=== Club achievements ===
Competition	Level	Wins	Years won
Premierships
Australian Football League	Seniors	1	1966
Australian Football League	Reserves (1919–1999)	3	1942, 1943, 1961
Australian Football League	Under 19s (1946–1991)	1	1957
Other titles and honours
AFL pre-season competition	Seniors	3	1996, 2004, 2008
VFL Night Series	Seniors	1	1958
Lightning Premiership	Seniors	1	1940
Victorian Blind Football League	Seniors	1	2021
Finishing positions
Australian Football League	Minor premiership (McClelland Trophy)	3	1965, 1997, 2009
Australian Football League	Grand Finalist	6	1913, 1965, 1971, 1997, 2009, 2010
Australian Football League	Wooden spoons	27	1897, 1898, 1899, 1900, 1901, 1902, 1904, 1909, 1910, 1920, 1924, 1943, 1945, 1947, 1948, 1952, 1954, 1955, 1977, 1979, 1983, 1984, 1985, 1986, 1988, 2000, 2014

=== VFL/AFL grand finals ===
1913 27 September 1913; 14:50 AEST (UTC+10:00)	Fitzroy	56–43	St Kilda	Melbourne Cricket Ground, Melbourne
	3.6 (24); 4.8 (32); 5.11 (41); 7.14 (56)		0.1 (1); 0.5 (5); 1.10 (16); 5.13 (43)	Attendance: 59,556; Umpires: Jack Elder
		Goals
	Shaw 2, Freake, Heaney, Martin, Norris, Parratt		Morrissey 2, Baird, Millhouse, Sellars

1965 25 September 1965; 14:50 AEST (UTC+10:00)	St Kilda	70–105	Essendon	Melbourne Cricket Ground, Melbourne
	1.6 (12); 4.8 (32); 5.11 (41); 9.16 (70)		2.7 (19); 5.10 (40); 10.18 (78); 14.21 (105)	Attendance: 104,846; Umpires: Jeff Crouch
		Goals
	Howell 3, Baldock 2, Rowland 2, Roberts, Smith		Fordham 7, Gosper 2, Sampson 2, Birt, Fraser, Mitchell

1966 24 September 1966; 14:50 AEST (UTC+10:00)	Collingwood	73–74	St Kilda	Melbourne Cricket Ground, Melbourne
	2.1 (13); 5.7 (37); 7.11 (53); 10.13 (73)		2.5 (17); 5.6 (36); 8.9 (57); 10.14 (74)	Attendance: 101,655; Umpires: Jeff Crouch
		Goals
	Tuddenham 3, Gabelich 2, Richardson 2, Graham, Pitt, Wallis		Neale 5, Baldock 2, Cooper, Griffiths, Moran

1971 25 September 1971; 14:30 AEST (UTC+10:00)	Hawthorn	82–75	St Kilda	Melbourne Cricket Ground, Melbourne
	2.2 (14); 4.4 (28); 5.7 (37); 12.10 (82)		2.1 (13); 4.6 (30); 8.9 (57); 11.9 (75)	Attendance: 118,192; Umpires: Peter Sheales
		Goals
	Keddie 4, Hudson 3, Crimmins 2, Matthews, Rice, Scott		Bonney 3, Breen 3, Davis, Manzie, Smith, Theodore, Trott

1997 27 September 1997; 14:45 AEST (UTC+10:00)	St Kilda	94–125	Adelaide	Melbourne Cricket Ground, Melbourne
	3.6 (24); 7.11 (53); 9.13 (67); 13.16 (94)		3.8 (26); 5.10 (40); 11.11 (73); 19.11 (125)	Attendance: 99,645; Umpires: Hayden Kennedy, Mark Nash, Bryan Sheehan
		Goals
	Hall 3, Heatley 3, Loewe 2, Burke, Harvey, Jones, Peckett, Winmar		Jarman 6, Ellen 5, Bond 4, Caven, Goodwin, Rintoul, Smart

2009 26 September 2009; 14:30 AEST (UTC+10:00)	St Kilda	68–80	Geelong	Melbourne Cricket Ground, Melbourne
	3.2 (20); 7.7 (49); 9.11 (65); 9.14 (68)		3.0 (18); 7.1 (43); 9.4 (58); 12.8 (80)	Attendance: 99,251; Umpires: Chris Donlon, Brett Rosebury, Shaun Ryan
		Goals
	Schneider 2, Dempster, Goddard, Hayes, Jones, Koschitzke, Montagna, Riewoldt		Chapman 3, Hawkins 2, Mooney 2, Rooke 2, Ablett, Byrnes, Selwood

2010 25 September 2010; 14:30 AEST (UTC+10:00)	Collingwood	68–68	St Kilda	Melbourne Cricket Ground, Melbourne
	4.2 (26); 7.8 (50); 7.13 (55); 9.14 (68)		3.2 (20); 4.2 (26); 7.5 (47); 10.8 (68)	Attendance: 100,016; Umpires: Ray Chamberlain, Brett Rosebury, Shaun Ryan
		Goals
	Cloke 2, Blair, Davis, Didak, Jolly, Lumumba, Macaffer, Thomas		Goddard 2, Milne 2, Riewoldt 2, Gilbert, Hayes, Koschitzke, Schneider

2010 Replay 2 October 2010; 14:30 AEST (UTC+10:00)	Collingwood	108–52	St Kilda	Melbourne Cricket Ground, Melbourne
	3.2 (20); 6.5 (41); 11.8 (74); 16.12 (108)		0.2 (2); 1.8 (14); 4.9 (33); 7.10 (52)	Attendance: 93,853; Umpires: Ray Chamberlain, Brett Rosebury, Shaun Ryan
		Goals
	Dawes 2, Didak 2, Macaffer 2, Sidebottom 2, Wellingham 2, Goldsack, Johnson, Jolly, Lumumba, Swan, Thomas		Milne 2, Dal Santo, Gilbert, Goddard, Hayes, Koschitzke

=== Individual achievements ===
Trevor Barker Award (Club best and fairest)

Brownlow Medal (League best and fairest)

- 1925 – Colin Watson
- 1957 – Brian Gleeson
- 1958 – Neil Roberts
- 1959 – Verdun Howell
- 1965 – Ian Stewart
- 1966 – Ian Stewart
- 1967 – Ross Smith
- 1987 – Tony Lockett
- 1997 – Robert Harvey
- 1998 – Robert Harvey

Norm Smith Medal (AFL Grand Final best on ground)

- 2010 – Lenny Hayes

Leigh Matthews Trophy (AFLPA Most Valuable Player)

- 1987 – Tony Lockett
- 1997 – Robert Harvey
- 2004 – Nick Riewoldt

Coleman Medal (Leading Goal Kicker)

- 1902 – Charlie Baker
- 1936 – Bill Mohr
- 1956 – Bill Young
- 1987 – Tony Lockett
- 1991 – Tony Lockett
- 2004 – Fraser Gehrig
- 2005 – Fraser Gehrig

AFL Rising Star (Best player under 21)

- 2001 – Justin Koschitzke
- 2002 – Nick Riewoldt

=== All-Australian teams ===
An All-Australian team is considered a "best-of" selection of players for each calendar year, with each player usually represented in their own team position. The All-Australian teams are selected by a panel. The concept of an All-Australian "team of the year" was first pioneered by Sporting Life Magazine in 1947, which created a team each year until 1955. No St Kilda players featured in these teams.

This concept was later adopted by the interstate carnivals and the Australian Football League. All teams from the interstate carnivals and the AFL have been endorsed as official by governing bodies of the sport, such as the Australian National Football Council and the AFL, whilst teams selected by Sporting Life are not recognised.

Interstate carnivals

- Neil Roberts – 1956
- Ian Stewart – 1966
- Darrel Baldock – 1966
- Bob Murray – 1969
- Travis Payze – 1972
- Bruce Duperouzel – 1980
- Danny Frawley – 1988

Australian Football League

- Geoff Cunningham – 1983
- Greg Burns – 1984
- Tony Lockett – 1987, 1991, 1992
- Danny Frawley – 1988
- Nicky Winmar – 1989, 1991, 1995
- Stewart Loewe – 1990, 1991, 1992
- David Grant – 1991
- Robert Harvey – 1992, 1994, 1995, 1996, 1997, 1998, 1999, 2003
- Nathan Burke – 1993, 1996, 1997, 1999
- Austinn Jones – 1997, 2004
- Peter Everitt – 1997, 1998
- Lenny Hayes – 2003, 2005, 2009
- Fraser Gehrig – 2004
- Nick Riewoldt – 2004, 2006, 2008, 2009, 2014
- Luke Ball – 2005
- Nick Dal Santo – 2005, 2009, 2011
- Sam Fisher – 2008
- Brendon Goddard – 2009, 2010
- Leigh Montagna – 2009, 2010
- Stephen Milne – 2011, 2012
- Sean Dempster – 2012
- Dan Butler – 2020
- Jack Steele – 2020, 2021
- Jack Sinclair – 2022, 2023
- Callum Wilkie – 2023, 2026
- Nasiah Wanganeen-Milera - 2025, 2026

== Records and statistics ==
Highest Score	31.18 (204) v Melbourne, Round 6, 1978, Melbourne Cricket Ground
Lowest Score	0.1 (1) v Geelong, Round 17, 1899, Corio Oval
Greatest Winning Margin	139 points v Brisbane, Round 22, 2005, Docklands Stadium
Greatest Losing Margin	178 points v Collingwood, Round 4, 1979, Victoria Park
Lowest Winning Score	3.8 (26) v Geelong 2.10 (22), Round 15, 1909, Junction Oval
Highest Losing Score	21.18 (144) v Collingwood 24.16 (160), Round 11, 1983, Moorabbin Oval
Highest Crowd	82,528 v Collingwood, Opening Round, 2026, Melbourne Cricket Ground

== Reserves team ==
St Kilda

Names
- Full name: St Kilda Football Club Limited

2000 season
- After finals: 5th
- Home-and-away season: 4th

Club details
- Founded: 1919 (as a reserves side), 2026 (re-founded)
- Competition: AFL reserves (1919−1999); VFL (2000, 2026-)
- Premierships: AFL reserves (3): 1942; 1943; 1961
- Training ground: Moorabbin Oval

Uniforms
Home

St Kilda was an inaugural club in the Victorian Junior Football League, which later became known as the VFL seconds.

Their first premiership in the competition came in 1942, with another to follow in 1943 and a third in 1961.

The team were also runners-up a total of six times, including in the last AFL reserves grand final in 1999.

Shane Warne, considered to be one of the greatest bowlers in the history of cricket, played a single game for the reserves side in 1988. He was incorrectly listed in the Record as "Trevor" Warne, and played in the Under-19s for the remainder of the season. Former St Kilda number one ticket holder John Moran also played for the reserves side.

Following the demise of the AFL reserves competition, the St Kilda reserves team competed in the second-tier Victorian Football League (VFL) in the 2000 season before the team was dissolved at the end of the year.

In 2001, St Kilda entered into a reserves affiliation with existing VFL club Springvale (which moved to Cranbourne and was renamed Casey in 2006). Under the affiliation, reserves players for St Kilda played VFL football with Springvale/Casey. The affiliation ended after the 2008 season. In 2009 St Kilda entered into an equivalent affiliation with Sandringham.

St Kilda renewed their agreement with Sandringham in 2017 as Moorabbin Oval was redeveloped into a boutique VFL and AFLW ground. Under the renewed agreement St Kilda had greater involvement in Sandringham's operations, who agreed to play three home games per year at Moorabbin Oval in St Kilda colours. The affiliation was extended to coaching and playing integration opportunities in 2023, while St Kilda committed to signing one rookie player from Sandringham per year.

Despite being competitive and reaching finals on several occasions in the early 2010's, St Kilda has regularly investigated ending the affiliation agreement with Sandringham. In April 2025, The Age reported Sandringham had rejected St Kilda's request for the team to change the club's nickname from Zebras to Saints, adopt the Saints colours permanently and shift all home games from Trevor Barker Beach Oval to Moorabbin Oval. On 30 June 2025, the club confirmed the affiliation would conclude at the end of the 2025 VFL season, and that St Kilda would field a standalone side in the VFL from 2026, thereby enabling the St Kilda reserves to return to competition for the first time in 26 years. The AFL granted a VFL licence to St Kilda the same day.

== Other teams ==
St Kilda has a team in the Victorian Blind Football League (VBFL), which entered the competition in 2019. The side won the 2021 VBFL premiership by 64 points.

== Activism ==
=== Same-sex marriage ===
During the Australian Marriage Law Postal Survey, St Kilda supported the Yes vote.

=== Voice to Parliament ===
St Kilda was a supporter of the Voice to Parliament.
