= Travis Payze =

Australian rules footballer and coach

Personal information
- Full name: Travis Irving Payze
- Born: 2 July 1946; Victoria, Australia
- Died: 1 September 2006 (aged 60)
- Original team: Frankston Bombers
- Debut: Round 1, 10 September 1966, St Kilda vs. Collingwood, at Melbourne Cricket Ground
- Height: 185 cm (6 ft 1 in)
- Weight: 85.5 kg (188 lb)

Playing career^{1}
Years	Club	Games (Goals)
1966–1974	St Kilda	127 (73)
1975-1977	Dandenong Football Club	40 (76)
Total		167 (149)
- ^{1} Playing statistics correct to the end of 1974.

Career highlights
- St Kilda premiership side 1966; All-Australian 1972

Travis Irving Payze (2 July 1946 – 1 September 2006) was an Australian rules footballer in the Victorian Football League.

Debuting for St Kilda against Collingwood in the 1966 second semi-final, Payze came off the bench and booted 3 goals. He was also named on the bench two weeks later in the Saints' first premiership side.

A lively forward, Payze had played only 12 games in his first four and a half seasons at the Saints, before he started to establish himself in the side as a ruck-rover. He was named as an All-Australian in 1972, and retired after the 1974 season.

He then coached Dandenong Football Club in the VFA, before returning to the Saints and becoming chairman of selectors in the early 1980s. He progressed to the president of St Kilda, a position he held from 1986 to 1993, in very difficult financial circumstances for the club.

In 2003, Payze was diagnosed with prostate cancer, and died on 1 September 2006, aged 60.
