= Fred Green (footballer) =

Australian rules footballer

Personal information
- Full name: Frederick John Green
- Born: 6 March 1921; Albert Park, Victoria
- Died: 7 January 1983 (aged 61); Gold Coast Hospital, Southport, Queensland
- Original team: Brunswick United
- Height: 182 cm (6 ft 0 in)
- Weight: 83 kg (183 lb)
- Position: Ruckman

Playing career^{1}
Years	Club	Games (Goals)
1939–41, 1943, 1946	Essendon	49 (7)
1947–51	St Kilda	67 (9)
Total		116 (16)

Coaching career
Years	Club	Games (W–L–D)
1951	St Kilda	18 (5)
- ^{1} Playing statistics correct to the end of 1951.

Frederick John Green CBE (6 March 1921 – 7 January 1983) was an Australian rules footballer who played with Essendon and St Kilda in the Victorian Football League (VFL).

== Football ==
Although he was not as tall as other ruckmen, Green was an effective knock ruckman during his career and also spent some time as a defender.

He played in Essendon's losing 1941 Grand Final team and left the club in 1944 due to Naval commitments.

Stationed in Canberra, Green captained the Navy side which competed in the CANFL and led them to the 1944 premiership. He continued playing in 1945 and won a Mulrooney Medal as the league's 'Best and fairest' player.

Green returned to Essendon in 1946 before crossing to St Kilda the following season. He celebrated his 100th VFL game with a five-point win over Fitzroy in 1950. Green captained St Kilda from 1949 to 1950 and was their playing coach in 1951.

== Honours ==
He was made a Commander of the Most Excellent Order of the British Empire (CBE) in the 1977 New Year Honours List, for "public service".

== Death ==
He died at the Gold Coast Hospital in Southport, Queensland on 7 January 1983.
