= Jimmy Smith (Australian footballer) =

Australian rules footballer and coach

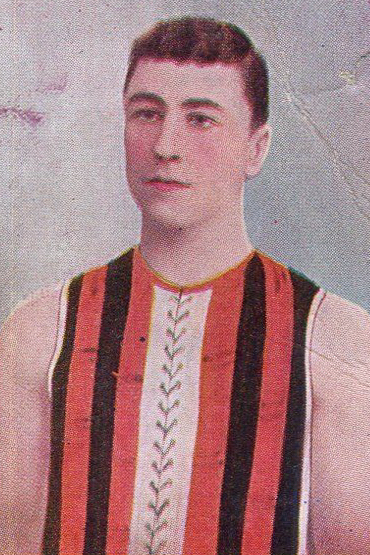
- Cigarette card of Smith in 1905

Personal information
- Full name: James Smith
- Born: 4 January 1877; Melbourne, Victoria
- Died: 18 August 1948 (aged 71); West Melbourne, Victoria
- Original team: West Melbourne
- Height: 178 cm (5 ft 10 in)
- Weight: 76 kg (168 lb)

Playing career^{1}
Years	Club	Games (Goals)	
1894–1898	West Melbourne		
1899–1906, 1908–1909	St Kilda	130 (22)	
1911	Ballarat		
1912	Brighton (VFA)	18 (6)	
1913	Melbourne City (VFA)	12 (0)	

Coaching career
Years	Club	Games (W–L–D)	
1909, 1915, 1918	St Kilda	49 (16–33–0)	

Umpiring career
Years	League	Role	Games
1907–8; 1910 1907	VFL; VFL	Field; Boundary	33; 2
- ^{1} Playing statistics correct to the end of 1913.

James Smith (4 January 1877 – 18 August 1948) was an Australian rules footballer who played with and coached St Kilda in the VFL during the early 1900s.

== Personal life ==
The son of George Smith and Ellen Smith (1849–1896), née O'Neil, James Smith was born in Melbourne on 4 January 1877. He was the youngest of their three sons and was known by the name “Jimmy” or “Jim”.

In early 1894, Smith married Mary Hayes (1874–1945) and they had five children together – Mary Kathleen (1894–1979), Ruby Myrtle (1895–1967), Margaret Smith (1898–1904), Ellen (1899–1966) and James Michael (1905–1911).

== Football career ==
Smith’s football career commenced in 1894 at age 17 with his inclusion in the West Melbourne team and he played with them for several years before moving to St Kilda.

Smith was St Kilda's ruckman for ten seasons, beginning in 1899. After his first year at St Kilda, Smith applied for a permit to return to West Melbourne but his application was refused. He continued with St Kilda and captained the club for the first time in 1901 and was also captain in 1903, 1904 and 1906. In 1900 and 1901 he represented Victoria at interstate football.

When he took the field for St Kilda in Round three of the 1905 season against Collingwood at Junction Oval Smith became the first St Kilda player to make 100 VFL appearances.

Smith spent the 1907 season as an umpire and although he returned to St Kilda in early 1908 he only played in the first two more rounds before returning to umpiring. In 1909 Smith was appointed as coach of St Kilda and he played his final game for them in Round 5 of that season. He again returning to the umpire ranks for the 1910 season.

As a VFL player, he never got to contest finals football, with St Kilda winning only 19 of the 130 games that he played in. He did however steer the club to the finals as coach in 1918.

In 1911 Smith was appointed as captain and coach of Ballarat and then in 1912 he was appointed as playing coach of Brighton in the Victorian Football Association (VFA).

In 1913, Smith captained and coached the Melbourne City Football Club in the Victorian Football Association.

In 1914, Smith devoted his time to a project to establish a World Tour for Australian Rules Football but this endeavour ultimately had to be abandoned with the commencement of World War I.

In 1915 Smith was re-appointed as coach of St Kilda, a post he resumed in 1918 after St Kilda’s two-year break from competition ended.

== Other sports ==
Smith was a noted boxer in his youth, and in later years had some success as a boxing trainer.

In addition, Smith coached and captained the Carlton Brewery tug-of-war team which went through its career undefeated, including wins in the heavyweight championship of Victoria was won in 1911, the All-Comers' Championship of Australasia, and The International Tug-of-War Championship of the World (representing Victoria in 1912). In total the team won 36 gold medals and 13 sashes.

== Union official ==
Jim Smith was for many years a member of the Liquor Trades Union and was one of the chief organisers of relief in times of industrial depression and major strikes, arranging for relief for the wives and families of wharf laborers and others.

== Death ==
James Smith died at his West Melbourne home in August 1948.
