= Graeme Gellie =

Australian rules footballer, born 1954

Personal information
- Born: 27 December 1954 (age 71)
- Original team: Redan (BFL)
- Height: 178 cm (5 ft 10 in)
- Weight: 76.5 kg (169 lb)

Playing career^{1}
Years	Club	Games (Goals)
1978–1983	St Kilda	32 (12)

Coaching career
Years	Club	Games (W–L–D)
1984–1986	St Kilda	62 (10–52–0)
- ^{1} Playing statistics correct to the end of 1983.

Career highlights
- St Kilda Best and Fairest 1978

Graeme Gellie (born 27 December 1954) is a former Australian rules footballer. He played for St Kilda as a rover, and won the club's best and fairest award in his first year, but an injury to his knee early in 1979 limited his career.

After Tony Jewell was sacked as St Kilda coach during the 1984 season, Gellie took over and coached for the next two years. When St Kilda won the wooden spoon in 1986, his contract was not continued. Gellie became an assistant coach to Malcolm Blight at Geelong. He also coached Queensland state junior teams. He currently lives in country Victoria.
