= Stan Lloyd (Australian footballer) =

Australian rules footballer, born 1911

Personal information
- Born: 6 November 1911; Whitton, NSW
- Died: 27 September 1987 (aged 75)
- Original team: Newtown (NSW)
- Height: 183 cm (6 ft 0 in)
- Weight: 79 kg (174 lb)

Playing career^{1}
Years	Club	Games (Goals)
1934–1942	St Kilda	117 (0)
- ^{1} Playing statistics correct to the end of 1942.

Career highlights
- St Kilda FC B&F Trevor Barker Award 1938; Captain of St Kilda FC 1940; St Kilda FC Lightning Premiership 1940

Stan Lloyd (6 November 1911 – 27 September 1987) was an Australian rules footballer who played with St Kilda in the Victorian Football League (VFL).

A defender, Lloyd won St Kilda's best and fairest in 1938.
