= Alan Killigrew =

Australian rules footballer and coach

Personal information
- Full name: Robert Killigrew
- Born: 27 January 1918; Prahran, Victoria
- Died: 10 June 2001 (aged 83); Perth, Western Australia
- Original team: Murtoa
- Height: 168 cm (5 ft 6 in)
- Weight: 71 kg (157 lb)

Playing career^{1}
Years	Club	Games (Goals)
1938–1945	St Kilda	78 (75)

Coaching career
Years	Club	Games (W–L–D)
1956–1958	St Kilda	54 (19–34–1)
1959–1962	Norwood	82 (45–36–1)
1963–1966	North Melbourne	70 (27–43–0)
1967	Subiaco	21 (3–18–0)
- ^{1} Playing statistics correct to the end of 1945.

Robert "Alan" Killigrew (27 January 1918 – 10 June 2001) was an Australian rules footballer who went on to a celebrated career as senior coach in the Victorian Football League (VFL), South Australian National Football League (SANFL) and West Australian National Football League (WANFL).

== Playing career ==
Killigrew (163 cm or 5 ft 4in) was a physically small man but an effective rover in 78 matches with the St Kilda Football Club from 1938 to 1941 and 1943 to 1945. Originally from Murtoa, he was voted club champion in 1940.

== Coaching career ==
After his playing career was over Killigrew moved to Ballarat, where he managed a pub and coached Ballarat East and Golden Point. In 1956 he moved back to Melbourne to coach the St Kilda Football Club. He held this position from 1956 to 1958, demanding a "guts and determination" approach with emphasis on a fast running style and use of the handpass as an offensive tool. In 1958 he led the club to its first-night premiership and during his tenure, he coached two players to Brownlow Medals – Brian Gleeson (in 1957) and Neil Roberts (1958).

Sensing a lack of support from the club board, Killigrew departed to Adelaide and the SANFL. He was senior coach at Norwood for three years where he steered the Redlegs to successive grand finals in 1960 and 1961 and a preliminary final in 1962.

In 1963, he was appointed a senior coach for the North Melbourne Football Club, where he again led a team to victory in the 1965 and 1966 night finals. He was a coach for three seasons, achieving a 28/38 win loss ratio (1 draw). An infamous moment was his violent run-in with Geelong's Geoff Rosenow in the player's race at Kardinia Park. He also was the successful state team coach for Victoria in the 1966 Carnival at Hobart.

In 1967, he moved once more, this time to Perth as coach of the WANFL's Subiaco Football Club. He held this position for a single season, his final year of senior coaching.

In 1972, he coached Wilston Grange Football Club in the QAFL in Brisbane to a premiership by a then-record Grand Final margin of 84 points. Alan also coached Brighton Football Club in the Glenelg South Adelaide District Football Association to a premiership in 1983.
