= Greg Westaway =

Gregory John Westaway is an Australian businessman and founder of Gregorys Transport, which went into liquidation in 2014. He is a past president of the AFL football club St Kilda.

In late 2007 he joined forces with a group of club identities and businesspeople to challenge the board. His board committed the club to relocate its training base and headquarters to Seaford, near Frankston. In May 2007 Westaway came out in support of St Kilda coach Ross Lyon, declaring that he would love to see him coach the club for a decade if possible. Ross Lyon subsequently walked out on St Kilda when contract talks were delayed.
