= Ansell Clarke =

Australian rules footballer, born 1907

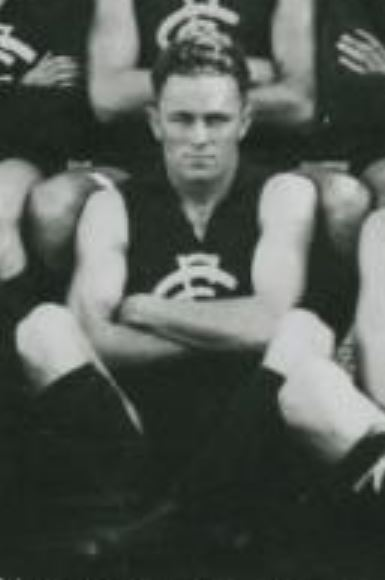
- Clarke in 1933

Personal information
- Born: 12 August 1907; Outtrim, Victoria
- Died: 15 October 2002 (aged 95); Melbourne, Victoria
- Debut: Round 7, 1929, Carlton vs. North Melbourne, at Princes Park
- Height: 173 cm (5 ft 8 in)
- Weight: 76 kg (168 lb)

Playing career^{1}
Years	Club	Games (Goals)
1929–1937	Carlton	144 (242)
1938–1940	St Kilda	26 (47)
Total		170 (289)

Coaching career
Years	Club	Games (W–L–D)
1938–1940	St Kilda	55 (28–27–0)
- ^{1} Playing statistics correct to the end of 1940.

Career highlights
- St Kilda FC Lightning Premiership 1940

Edward Augustus "Ansell" Clarke (12 August 1907 – 15 October 2002) was an Australian rules footballer in the Victorian Football League.

== Football ==
Clarke made his debut for the Carlton Football Club in Round 7 of the 1929 season. He was appointed captain in 1937.

He was the senior coach at the St Kilda Football Club from 1938 to 1940 with 28 wins from 55 matches. He was captain-coach for 1938 and 1939, until he retired as a player in May 1940.

He later returned as a player for one final match in July 1940.
