= Ross Smith (Australian footballer, born 1942) =

Australian rules footballer

Personal information
- Full name: Ross Gibson Smith
- Born: 12 September 1942 (age 84)
- Original team: Hampton Scouts
- Debut: Round 2, 1961, St Kilda vs. Essendon, at Windy Hill
- Height: 173 cm (5 ft 8 in)
- Weight: 75 kg (165 lb)

Playing career^{1}
| Years | Club | Games (Goals) |
| 1961–1972 | St Kilda | 222 (222) |
| 1973–1974 | Subiaco | 39 (22) |
| 1975 | St Kilda | 12 (8) |
| Total | | 273 (252) |

Coaching career
| Years | Club | Games (W–L–D) |
| 1973–1974 | Subiaco | |
| 1977 | St Kilda | 22 (3–17–2) |
- ^{1} Playing statistics correct to the end of 1975.

Career highlights
- St Kilda Football Club premiership player 1966; Brownlow Medallist 1967; Trevor Barker Award 1967, 1971; St Kilda Football Club captain 1970–1972; Victoria state captain 1972; Subiaco Football Club premiership coach 1973; Australian Football Hall of Fame inductee 2010

Ross Gibson Smith (born 12 September 1942) is a former Australian rules footballer who played in the Victorian Football League (VFL).

Smith played with St Kilda as a courageous rover. He won the Brownlow Medal in 1967 and captained Victoria at the 1972 Perth Carnival. He once broke his arm smothering a ball in the late sixties and recovered to captain the Saints in the early seventies.

He coached Subiaco to a premiership in 1973. He also coached his former club St Kilda for a single season (1977), leading them only three wins and to their first wooden spoon in 22 years.

In 1987, he was appointed as a director for the Australian Institute of Sport for 3 years, after which he was the director of Sports Science Sports Medicine research at the AIS for 10 years.

He was inducted to the Saints inaugural Hall of Fame in 2003, and then the AFL Hall of Fame in 2010. In addition he was chosen as first rover in St Kilda's Team of the Century.
