= History of the St Kilda Football Club =

St Kilda Football Club

Names
- Full name: St Kilda Football Club
- Nickname(s): The Saints, Sainters
- Motto: Fortius Quo Fidelius ("Strength through Loyalty")

Club details
- Founded: 1873
- Colours: Red, White and Black
- Competition: Australian Football League
- Grounds: Docklands Stadium, Melbourne (capacity: 55,000)
- Moorabbin Oval

Other information
- Official website: www.saints.com.au

The St Kilda Football Club, nicknamed the Saints, is a professional Australian rules football club based in Melbourne, Victoria, Australia. The club plays in the Australian Football League (AFL), the highest league in the country.

The club was established in 1873 and its name originates from the Melbourne suburb of St Kilda. The club was a foundation team of the Victorian Football Association (VFA) in 1877 and in 1897 became a foundation team in the Victorian Football League (VFL), which was renamed the Australian Football League prior to the start of the 1990 premiership season.

The club does not acknowledge any connection to the original St Kilda football club (1858–1864) or the 1872 St Kilda club, however it does have a connection to the South Yarra Football Club (1858-1873) having formed by that club's St Kilda based players.

== South Yarra St Kilda Split: 1872-1876 ==
In 1872, St Kilda based players from the South Yarra Football Club (established 1858) broke away and trained in St Kilda, these players were many of the club's finest. For the 1873 season, they cut ties completely with South Yarra to form a new club, St Kilda Football Club, based in St Kilda. The club initially struggled for numbers and in 1875, fielded a combined team with Melbourne University Football Club where remainder of the players had gone after South Yarra folded between 1873 and 1875.

== Victorian Football Association: 1877–96 ==
In the early stages the club played at an area known as the "Alpaca Paddock" next to the present site of the St Kilda Bowling Club near the St Kilda railway station. Alpacas were a kind of llama with long wool which had been imported from South America as a money-raising venture. St Kilda soon boasted a membership of 60 and showed that it would exceed its initial aim of being a junior club. By the end of the first season the Saints were able to force a draw with the top-ranking Carlton and everything looked rosy. There were tough times ahead but St Kilda's uphill battle was not without its humorous moments. Only 12 St Kilda players turned up for a match in Bendigo and the game against Albert Park started 90 minutes late after the ball burst when it was being inflated prior to the match. Amalgamation with the university football club did not help the cause either, but the club was still one of the original members of the Victorian Football Association (VFA) when it was formed in 1877. That year St Kilda became only the second team to journey interstate (Melbourne had gone to South Australia a fortnight earlier) and beat Adelaide, then a combined South Australian side.

By 1879 the club slipped to its lowest ebb. After the side failed to turn up for a game at Essendon, all further matches were abandoned. St Kilda sank into junior ranks for the next six years. The club returned to senior competition in 1886 and struggled to make its mark. A decision was made to amalgamate with nearby Prahran and St Kilda retained their colours, name and ground, as well as picking up a number of Prahran players. Even at this early point St Kilda had a reputation for being able to lift miraculously on their day and roll the best teams in the competition. Another trademark was the presence of some of the foremost players in football. Alf Smith, a champion rover, was one of the earliest stars, but the hot and cold Saints could never sustain their brilliance for long. Proof of the team's quixotic nature came in the last season it played in the VFA when several top players missed the Collingwood game because they chose to go to the races instead.

St Kilda competed as a senior club in the VFA from 1877 to 1879, 1881 to 1882 and 1886 to 1896 before competing in the Victorian Football League (VFL) from 1897 onwards.

== Early years in the VFL: 1897–1915 ==
St Kilda's early years in the Victorian Football League were not successful, finishing last in nine of the first 14 seasons. In 1899, St Kilda scored the lowest score ever recorded in a VFL/AFL match, one point against Geelong (who scored 162).

In 1897, 1898 and 1899 St Kilda finished eighth on the ladder. In the opening round of 1900 St Kilda and Melbourne tied, but a St Kilda protest over an incorrectly awarded point was upheld. The relief was only temporary as the team lost every other game for the year. By an ironical twist, Melbourne went on to the premiership. The Saints finished last on the ladder again in 1901 and 1902, setting a record for ineptitude unequalled in a major Australian football league until Sturt took its seventh consecutive wooden spoon in the 1995 season and finished with eight consecutive from 1989 to 1996. In 1903 St Kilda finished fifth on the ladder. In 1904 a committee shake-up heralded a bold new recruiting drive and the club netted much-travelled ruckman Vic Cumberland and champion Tasmanian rover Vic Barwick, but in 1904 St Kilda finished eighth on the ladder and in 1905 seventh. Within two years of the bold new recruiting drive the brilliant young forward Dave McNamara and a talented batch of interstate men were on the books and St Kilda rose to sixth place in 1906.

The St Kilda team took the football world by storm early in 1907 by winning the opening six games. Six successive wins to start the 1907 season saw the club make the finals for the first time, finishing third with nine wins and eight losses. St Kilda 4.11 (35) were beaten by Carlton 13.13 (91) in the club's first VFL final by 56 points in front of 26,100 at the Melbourne Cricket Ground (MCG). The team again finished third in 1908 and qualified for the finals again. St Kilda 3.8 (26) were eliminated by Carlton 12.12 (84) by 58 points in front of 25,531 at the MCG. In 1909 and 1010 St Kilda finished last on the ladder after a protest by Geelong over the eligibility of Bill Stewart whom the Saints played when suspended, second last in 1911 and third last in 1912.

=== 1913 season ===
In the 1913 season, St Kilda finished fourth and made a storming run to the 1913 finals. In the Preliminary Final St Kilda 10.10 (70) defeated Fitzroy 6.9 (45), in front of 54,846 at the MCG making it into the grand final. St Kilda ended up playing Fitzroy for the Premiership in the 1913 Grand Final for the first time in the club's history. The match became a nightmare for the Saints when they hadn't scored a goal by half-time. At the last change they trailed by 25 points. Suddenly St Kilda sparked to life and four goals brought the within a point. St Kilda charged forward again and landed the ball with Baird who marked within scoring range, yet amazingly tried to handpass to Morissey who hurriedly shot for goal, scoring just a point. Fitzroy then scored two more goals to win by 13 points. Fitzroy 7-14 (56) to St Kilda 5-13 (43).

=== 1914 and 1915 seasons ===
In the 1914 season the St Kilda finished seventh on the ladder and did not make the finals. In 1915 they were also disappointing as the club finished eighth on the ladder. Due to World War I, the St Kilda team were in recess in 1916 and 1917.

== Resuming after recess: 1918–39 ==
The club resumed in 1918 and fared well, making the finals in fourth position, but was eliminated by Collingwood in the semi-finals by nine points, 58 to 49.

Results declined in the early 1920s, with the club finishing last in 1920 and 1924. The following years saw St Kilda establish itself as more consistently competitive, despite being the poorest club in the league apart from new entrants Hawthorn and North Melbourne owing to an absence of wealthy industrial and political patrons. Colin Watson played brilliantly in 1925, winning the Brownlow Medal.

The St Kilda team made the finals in 1929 and were eliminated by Carlton 12.9 (81) to 11.7 (73) in the semi-finals. However, financial problems and committee disputes meant that the club fell into the bottom four every year from 1931 and 1933, only avoiding the wooden spoon by eight percent in 1932.

The mid-to-late 1930s saw the club consistently vying for finals berths, finally making the finals again in 1939 by finishing fourth after a record run of eight consecutive victories and an overall record of 13 wins and 5 losses: the best home and away season in the club's history up to that point. Unfortunately for the Saints, three other clubs did even better, but going into the first semi final against Richmond there was felt to be substantial ground for optimism as the Saints had won their last four meetings. St Kilda had not been victorious in a finals match for twenty-six years (though they had engaged in only two finals matches during that time) but for once the optimism was not misplaced as the Saints raced to a comfortable 30 point win, 10.12 (72) to 6.6 (42).

The team had its first finals win since 1913 over Richmond in the semi-final winning 10.12 (72) to 6.6 (42) at the MCG in front of 51,411. Then in the Preliminary Final, St Kilda 15.15 (105) lost to Collingwood 20.14 (134) in front of 66,848 at the MCG on the 23/9/1939, with Ron Todd kicking eleven goals.

== 1940–59 ==
The breakthrough win in the finals of 1939 did not herald a period of success for the club and St Kilda's fortunes took a rapid nose-dive in 1940 and thereafter the club continued to struggle. The club won three of the first four games early in the 1940 season and was on top of the ladder after Round 4 before finishing second last. Though there was some high-class players like Harold Bray, Keith Drinan, Peter Bennett and later Neil Roberts, St Kilda were rarely competitive. Indeed, it is doubtful if the club has ever experienced a worse decade than the 1940s which yielded only 34 wins and 4 draws from 174 matches for a paltry success rate of just over 20%. During the entire decade the Saints (or the 'Panthers' as they were briefly known at around this time) only twice finished outside the bottom two, and never once achieved as many wins in a season as defeats. The club finished last seven times in 13 years between 1943 and 1955.

The 1950 season saw the club win the first five games before fading to finish with eight wins and a draw in ninth place. The 1950s brought improvement of sorts, at least when compared to the 1940s, but St Kilda could still hardly be regarded as a glamorous club.

In 1955, after one of the club's worst seasons, Alan Killigrew was appointed coach. His first action was one of the most massive clean-outs of players in the history of any VFL club. It is believed that only 17 players from 1955 played for St Kilda again in 1956, while 11 new players appeared in the club's opening match of 1956. The appointment of Alan Killigrew as coach eliminated the defeat-accepting attitude of St Kilda and soon made the team more competitive. In the late 1950s St Kilda vied for finals berths without making the finals. St Kilda had three consecutive Brownlow Medal winners; Brian Gleeson in 1957, Neil Roberts in 1958 and Verdun Howell in 1959.

In 1958 St Kilda won the Consolation Night Series competition, a competition played at night at the end of the home and away rounds between the eight teams that finished between 5th and 12th and failed to qualify for the VFL Premiership Season Finals Series. St Kilda defeated Carlton 16.13 (109) to 15.11 (101) in the final.

== 1960–73 ==
In 1961, after finishing sixth in 1960, Allan Jeans was appointed coach. St Kilda made the final four for the first time since 1939, finishing third with eleven wins and seven losses. However, with star full-back Verdun Howell unfit, the club lost to Footscray 9.15 (69) to St Kilda 8.12 (60) in the first semi-final, in front of 86,411 at the MCG. In 1962 St Kilda Football Club finished 9th on the Ladder with a modest nine wins and nine losses during the home and away season. St Kilda had a convincing sequence of six consecutive wins ever over the last six rounds of the 1963 season to finish in fourth position with 13 wins (52 premiership points), two premiership points behind minor premiers Hawthorn. The club lost to Melbourne 9.17 (71) to St Kilda 8.16 (64) in the first semi-final, in front of 88,914 at the MCG. In 1964 St Kilda was defeated in the final of the Consolation Night Series competition, a competition played at night at the end of the home and away rounds between the eight teams that finished between 5th and 12th and failed to qualify for the VFL Premiership Season Finals Series. St Kilda was defeated by Footscray 11.12 (78) to 11.7 (73) in the final.

1965 VFL SEASON
1st Minor Premiership

After the 1964 season, the club moved to Moorabbin Oval in the south-eastern suburbs of Melbourne in an effort to attract the population of a rapidly growing region. The move was a success and in 1965 St Kilda finished a game clear on top of the standings with 14 wins and 4 losses, qualifying for the finals series in first position and winning the minor premiership for the first time in 1965. Ian Stewart won the 1965 Brownlow Medal.

Finishing second on the table St Kilda went into the 1965 Finals Series confident. In the second semi final St Kilda 13.24 (102) defeated Collingwood 14.17 (101) by 1 point in front of 98,395 at the MCG on the 11/9/1965, which meant that they progressed to the Grand Final. St Kilda played in the Grand Final against the Essendon Football Club and lost 14.21 (105) to St Kilda's 9.16 (70) in front of 104,846 at the MCG on the 25/9/1965.

=== 1966 season ===
In round 1 of the 1966 VFL season, St Kilda thrashed Melbourne by 76 points at the MCG. This was followed by a 53-point win against Carlton the following round at Moorabbin Oval. In Round 3, St Kilda continued its winning streak by defeating North Melbourne 9.13.67 to St Kilda 15.13.103 and followed this by pushing aside Geelong the next week by 43 points. In the following rounds St Kilda defeated South Melbourne by 42 points, Fitzroy by 64 points, Hawthorn by 24 points and Essendon by 7 points. In Round 9, St Kilda's undefeated streak came to an end when they were defeated by Richmond at the MCG by 35 points. St Kilda were thrashed by Collingwood the following round at Victoria Park by 72 points. St Kilda won their next two games against Footscray and Melbourne before being defeated by Carlton by 16 points in Round 13. St Kilda's 38 point win against North Melbourne was followed by a loss to Geelong in round 15 by 23 points. St Kilda then won its final 3 games against South Melbourne, Fitzroy and Hawthorn. St Kilda finished with 14 wins and 4 losses, qualifying for the finals in second place and Ian Stewart won his second consecutive Brownlow Medal.

St Kilda 1966 Grand Final Side
B:	Rodger Head	Bob Murray	Brian Sierakowski
HB:	Verdun Howell	Ian Synman	John Bingley
C:	Jeff Moran	Ian Stewart	Jim Read
HF:	Ian Cooper	Darrel Baldock (c)	Barry Breen
F:	Alan Morrow	Kevin Neale	Allan Davis
Foll:	Brian Mynott	Daryl Griffiths	Ross Smith
Res:	Travis Payze	Kevin Billing	
Coach:	Allan Jeans		

1966 VFL Grand Final
1st Premiership

The 1966 finals series saw St Kilda play Collingwood in the first semi-final, in which St Kilda lost 13.11 (89) to Collingwood 15.9 (99) in front of 95,614 at the MCG. This took St Kilda to the preliminary in which St Kilda 15.4 (94) defeated Essendon 7.10 (52) in front of 93,543 at the MCG. This took St Kilda to the grand final against Collingwood. Twenty-five minutes into the final quarter and with scores level, Collingwood's Wayne Richardson had a shot at goal on the run but kicked it out of bounds on the full. St Kilda then began to work the ball out of defence after winning the boundary throw in. A kick from Ian Cooper saw the ball make its way to centre half forward. Collingwood defender Ted Potter failed to mark the ball low down and with the players scrummaging for the ball a bounce was called. Brian Mynott won the tap for the Saints but it was intercepted by Potter who was quickly tackled. Potter however managed to get out a hand pass but it found its way to St Kilda's Barry Breen who snapped at goal and kicked a behind to put his side in front. With about a minute left on the clock, Collingwood were able to work the ball towards their forward line. Robert Murray, however, was able to take a mark at centre half back and the siren sounded after he kicked the ball towards the wing. St Kilda defeated Collingwood in the 1966 grand final 10-14 (74) to 10-13 (73), winning the premiership for the first time.

=== Post 1966 ===
In the 1967 VFL Season, Ross Smith won the league's highest individual award, the Brownlow Medal. The 1968 season saw the Saints qualify fourth with 14 wins, 5 losses and a draw. In the 1968 Finals Series St Kilda played Geelong in the First Semi-final. St Kilda lost 11.17 (83) to Geelong 19.13 (127) at the MCG in front of 98,885 people. A disappointing seventh place home and away season finish in 1969 was followed by another finals appearance in 1970, where St Kilda qualified in third place with 14 wins and 8 losses. The St Kilda Football Club qualified for the 1970 Finals Series, in which it played South Melbourne in the First Semi-final. St Kilda ended up winning the match by 53 points, 22.11 (143) to South Melbourne 13.12 (90), in front of 104,239 at the MCG. In the Preliminary Final St Kilda 7.19 (61) lost to Carlton 17.21 (123) in front of 108,215 at the MCG. In the 1971 Premiership season St Kilda qualified for the Finals Series in second place at the end of the home and away season with 16 wins. In the 1971 Finals Series St Kilda played Hawthorn in the Second Semi-final in which St Kilda lost 12.16 (88) to Hawthorn 12.18 (90) in front of 99,822 at the MCG. In the Preliminary Final St Kilda 16.12 (108) defeated Richmond 12.6 (78) in front of 102,484 at the MCG. This took St Kilda to the Grand Final against Hawthorn in front of 118,192 at the MCG. St Kilda 11.9 (75) lost to Hawthorn 12.10 (82) on the 25/9/1971. The club then qualified fourth for the finals series in 1972, with 14 wins and 8 losses. In the 1972 Finals Series St Kilda played Essendon in the Elimination Final in which St Kilda won 18.16 (124) to Essendon 10.11 (71) in front of 52,499 at Waverley Park. In the First Semi-final St Kilda 11.17 (83) defeated Collingwood 8.17 (65) in front of 91,857 at the MCG. This took St Kilda to the Preliminary Final against Carlton in front of 92,272 at the MCG. St Kilda 13.15 (93) lost to Carlton 16.13 (109) on the 30/9/1972. 1973 saw the club qualify for a record fourth consecutive finals series in fifth with 12 wins. In the 1973 Finals Series St Kilda played Essendon in the Elimination Final in which St Kilda won 24.14 (134) to Essendon 13.13 (91) in front of 53,405 at Waverley Park. In the First Semi-final St Kilda 9.14 (68) lost to Richmond 15.18 (108) in front of 86,483at the MCG.

From 1960 to 1973, St Kilda qualified for 9 finals series in 13 years, four preliminary finals including three in a row in 1970, 1971 & 1972, and 3 Grand Finals in 1965, 1966 and 1971. The club won one premiership and one minor premiership from 1960 to 1973. Allan Jeans coaching career at St Kilda ended with his retirement from St Kilda's coaching team at the end of the 1976 season.

== 1974–1989 ==
The 1974 season saw the Saints decline to the lower half of the ladder for the first time since the 1950s, finishing tenth with seven wins. The club failed to build on competitive seasons in 1975 and 1976, finishing last in 1977. 1978 began and ended in excellent form, but a mid-season slump saw the club narrowly miss the finals. The 1979 season began well with a win over Hawthorn despite serious financial problems at the club, but thereafter St Kilda had a run of defeats and finished a clear last. Continuing financial pressure and bad on-field performances saw the club remain in the bottom three for every season from 1979 to 1986.

The Saints finished last 7 times in 12 seasons from 1977 to 1988.

In 1987 St Kilda, with Tony Lockett at full forward, moved off the bottom for the first time since 1982 with nine wins. Lockett won the Coleman Medal for leading goalkicker in the home and away season with 117 goals. He went on to win the AFL's highest individual award, the Brownlow Medal, the same year.

== VFL to AFL: 1990–2000 ==
Under Ken Sheldon, coach from 1990 to 1993, St Kilda underwent a brief revival, contesting finals series in 1991 and 1992 with limited success. At their best, the Saints of the early 1990s were as good as any other side in the competition. Boasting arguably the game's premier key forwards in Tony Lockett and Stewart Loewe, and with a formidable midfield set up incorporating the likes of Nicky Winmar, Nathan Burke, Gilbert McAdam and Dean Greig, St Kilda were capable, on their day, of producing some high standard football.

The Victorian Football League was renamed the Australian Football League prior to the start of the 1990 premiership season. A very competitive 1991 AFL season saw St Kilda qualify for the finals series for the first time since 1973, qualifying fourth at the end of the home and away rounds. With Tony Lockett winning the Coleman Medal for leading goalkicker in the home and away season with 118 goals. In the 1991 finals series St Kilda, 14.13 (97), were defeated by Geelong, 15.14 (104), in an elimination final in front of 63,796 people at Waverley Park on 8 September 1991 and were eliminated from the finals.

In a competitive 1992 AFL season, St Kilda again qualified for the finals series, qualifying sixth at the end of the home and away rounds. In an elimination final St Kilda, 13.13 (91), defeated Collingwood, 12.11 (83), to progress to the semi-finals when, on 12 September 1992, in front of 60,000 people at Waverley Park, St Kilda, 14.6 (90), were defeated by Footscray, 19.5 (119), and were eliminated from the finals.

A mediocre season in 1993 precipitated Sheldon's departure.

=== Stan Alves era: 1994–98 ===
Under Stan Alves, there was little immediate indication that the club was about to turn the corner. A combination of continued financial pressures and unpredictable factors, such as the loss of glamour full forward Lockett to Sydney, made St Kilda's long-term prospects begin to look precarious.

1996 AFL Ansett Cup
1st AFL Cup

In the 1994 premiership season St Kilda finished 13th on the ladder out of 15 teams in a disappointing season. The following 1995 season, St Kilda once again disappointed as they finished 14th out of 16 teams. St Kilda won the 1996 Ansett Australia Cup pre-season competition with a 58-point defeat of reigning day premiers Carlton. The team had wins over Hawthorn in the round of 16, Adelaide in the quarter-finals, West Coast in the semi-finals and defeated Carlton in the final 20-10 (130) to 10-12 (72) in front of 66,888 people at Waverley Park, with Nicky Winmar winning the Michael Tuck Medal for the player judged best on ground. In the 1996 season St Kilda disappointed its supporters after a promising pre-season competition to find itself finished 10th after round 22. St Kilda won just 10 games for the season.

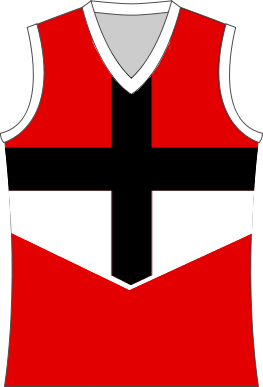
St Kilda's home jumper in 1997.

In the 1997 premiership season, St Kilda had a consistent home and away season. St Kilda qualified for the 1997 finals series in first position at the end of the home and away rounds with 15 wins and 7 losses and winning the minor premiership for the second time in the club's history. At the end of the 1997 season Robert Harvey won the league's highest individual award, the Brownlow Medal, with a total of 26 votes.

1997 AFL SEASON
2nd Minor Premiership

In the 1997 finals series St Kilda played Brisbane in a qualifying final. St Kilda 20.15 (135) defeated Brisbane 13.11 (89), in front of 50,035 at Waverley Park on 7 September. In a preliminary final St Kilda 15.14 (104) defeated North Melbourne 11.7 (73) by 31 points at the MCG in front of 77,531. St Kilda was now in the AFL Grand Final against Adelaide. St Kilda played well in the first half to lead at the main break by 13 points, but the second half was a disaster as the Crows added 14 goals to 6 to win pulling away. Players like Harvey, Cook and Jones were conspicuous for the Saints, but too many of their colleagues went missing when the action heated up. St Kilda 13.16 (94) lost to Adelaide 19.11 (125) in front of 98,828 at the MCG. In 1998 St Kilda also won through to the Ansett Australia Cup Final before being eliminated by North Melbourne. St Kilda 12.11 (83) lost to North Melbourne 14.13 (97) by 14 points at Waverley Park. In a competitive 1998 Premiership season, St Kilda had a great start winning 11 of its first 14 Games, but unfortunately an end of season drop of in from saw St Kilda drop down the Ladder. St Kilda again qualified for the Finals Series finishing sixth. Robert Harvey won his second successive Brownlow Medal. In the 1998 Finals Series St Kilda 13.9 (87) was defeated by Sydney 12.17 (89) in the Qualifying Final in front of 36,076 at the SCG on the 5/9/1998. In the semi-final, St Kilda 7.14 (56) lost to Melbourne 15.17 (107) by 51 in front of 88,456 at the MCG. At the end of the 1998 season Stan Alves was sacked as St Kilda coach.

=== Under Tim Watson: 1999–2000 ===
St Kilda's 1999 side was on the decline winning just 10 games. In 2000 the St Kilda Football Club moved to a new playing home at Docklands Stadium, Melbourne (currently also called Marvel Stadium, a sponsorship name) whilst maintaining training and administration headquarters at Moorabbin. Success was limited, in the 2000 season St Kilda won just two games for the entire season and Tim Watson resigned but finished the year.

== Grant Thomas era: 2001–2006 ==
In 2001 Malcolm Blight signed for $1 million AUD as senior coach. Blight was sacked after Round 15 (3 wins, 12 losses). His famous humiliation of the players by making them stay on the ground (Telstra Dome) highlighted the worsening relation between the coach, players and club supporters. In Round 16 Grant Thomas was appointed caretaker coach after the controversial mid-season sacking of Malcolm Blight. With his experience in the business world, Thomas took a new philosophy to the St Kilda Football Club when he was appointed caretaker coach of the club in 2001. Thomas had a focus on 'man-management' in his coaching style, as well as conducting practices on the running of the club that are common in the business world. This new style of coaching was characterised by Thomas's occasional use of jargon such as "processes" and "outcomes" – although they are now terms almost universally used by all coaches.

In the 2001 season St Kilda finished 15th (out of 16) with four wins. In the opening round the Western Bulldogs 16.11 (107) lost to St Kilda 16.16 (112), In Round 6; St Kilda 18.12 (120) defeated Sydney 14.10 (94), In Round 12; Fremantle 11.14 (80) were defeated by St Kilda 12.18 (90), and in round 22; Hawthorn 13.9 (87) lost to St Kilda 13.11 (89). In 2002 Season Grant Thomas was then appointed as full-time coach. The Saints, under Grant Thomas, again struggled, with only five wins and one draw out of 22 to again finish second last. In the 2003 Season there were signs that the team was at last beginning to turn things around, as it played some eye catching football to storm up the ladder and only narrowly miss the finals, finishing 11th with 11 wins.

2004 AFL Wizard Cup
2nd AFL Cup

2004 began with the club winning the 2004 Wizard Home Loans Cup. St Kilda had wins over Adelaide in the round of 16, Richmond in the quarter-final, Essendon in the semi-final and defeated Geelong in the final 1.14.5 (98) to 1.10.7 (76) in front of 50,533 people at Telstra Dome, with Robert Harvey winning the Michael Tuck Medal for the player judged best on ground during the final. The 2004 Premiership season saw the club win a club record ten consecutive matches between round 1 and round 10, before they were defeated by Sydney in Round 11. A consistent and very competitive season saw St Kilda finish third at the end of the home and away rounds and qualify for the finals series with 16 wins and 6 losses. Full-forward Fraser Gehrig won the Coleman Medal for the most goals kicked in the 2004 home and away season (90). In the 2004 AFL Finals Series St Kilda played Brisbane in the First Qualifying Final. St Kilda 10.9 (69) got smashed by Brisbane 23.11 (149) to lose by 80 points in front of 33,582 at the Gabba on the 3/9/2004. In the semi-final St Kilda 16.11 (107) defeated Sydne 8.8 (56) in front of 50,671 at the MCG. In the Preliminary Final St Kilda 13.10 (88) lost to Port Adelaide 14.10 (94) by 6 points in front of 46,978 people at Football Park. Going out in the Preliminary Final.

In a consistent and very competitive 2005 Premiership season, the Saints finished the home and away rounds in the top four in fourth position, qualifying for the Finals Series with 14 wins and 8 losses. Full-forward Fraser Gehrig won the Coleman Medal for the most goals kicked in the 2005 home and away season (74). In the 2005 Finals Series St Kilda 10.5 (65) defeated Adelaide 8.9 (57) in the Qualifying Final at AAMI Stadium in front of 48,768 people. In the Preliminary Final St Kilda 9.11 (65) lost to Sydney 15.6 (96) in front of 73,344 at the MCG. A competitive 2006 Premiership season with 14 wins and 8 losses saw the club finish sixth at the end of the home and away rounds and qualify for their third successive finals series. In the 2006 Finals Series St Kilda 10.12 (72) lost to Melbourne 13.12 (90) in the Elimination Final in front of 67,528 fans at the MCG. Later on Grant Thomas was sacked, On 11 October 2006, Ross Lyon was appointed as the new coach for the Saints for 2007 to 2009.

== Ross Lyon era: 2007–2011 ==
In 2006 Ross Lyon was shortlisted as a candidate for the position of coach of the St Kilda Football Club for the 2007 season. Although some considered him a surprise candidate, Lyon was appointed for three years after a lengthy application process. Upon becoming coach of the club, Lyon hired his own assistants, with close friend and AFL Team of the Century fullback Stephen Silvagni, former Kangaroos and Hawthorn player and Melbourne assistant coach Anthony Rock, former Carlton assistant coach Tony Elshaug and former Fitzroy and Hawthorn forward John Barker all being appointed in assistant coaching positions. Lyon also recruited veteran ruckman Matthew Clarke to the club and oversaw the recruitment of six rookies for the first time in the club's history.

=== 2007–2008 seasons ===
Lyon began his first season as coach with a victory against Melbourne in Round 1 of 2007 and the Saints then won four of their first seven games . Injuries hit the club badly in Round 8, however, with St Kilda having only 24 out of a possible 38 players to choose from against the Hawthorn Football Club. Lyon was criticised for flooding excessively and many became angry with the more defensive style of St Kilda over the subsequent weeks After an upset victory in Robert Harvey's 350th match in Round 12 against West Coast, Lyon proceeded to guide his Saints to win three out of the next four matches and draw a game against the Western Bulldogs. This left the Saints in eighth position on the ladder, a spot the side was unable to maintain after narrow losses to reigning grand-finalists Sydney and West Coast in the remaining five rounds. The club narrowly missed playing finals for the fourth consecutive season, finishing 9th with 11 wins, 1 draw and 10 losses for the year. Despite missing finals action the Saints finished the year strongly, winning 7.5 of the last 11 matches. Lyon oversaw a team in transition in his first season as coach, with a significant part of the Saints' squad from the 2004 and 2005 seasons having retired or moved on.

2008 AFL NAB Cup
3rd AFL Cup

During the 2007 trade period, St Kilda were widely considered to have traded very well, picking up Geelong premiership ruckman Steven King, Geelong forward Charlie Gardiner and Swans pair Adam Schneider and Sean Dempster for draft selections No. 26 and No. 90.

The St Kilda Football Club Season 2008 began with the club winning the NAB Cup. The club had wins over Richmond in the round of 16, Geelong in the quarter-final, Essendon in the semi-final and won the final against the Adelaide Crows by 5 points at AAMI Stadium, 69 to 64. Jason Gram won the Michael Tuck Medal for the player judged best on ground during the final. Despite the great start, the Saints went on to have a mixed first half of the season with a five-win, six-loss record. However, since then their fortunes have vastly improved, having sealed a spot in the finals series. This mixed season drew both criticism and praise at differing times towards Lyon, from supporters and the media. His game plan has been described as one championing accountability, similar to the Sydney Swans model by Paul Roos. Lyon's surprise move to drop midfield star Nick Dal Santo (as well as Stephen Milne from the side was due to them not meeting these "benchmarks". Arguably, it was a turning point in the Saints' season, as they went on to win the next 4 games following this bold move, and was considered a strong message by Lyon. In a very competitive 2008 Premiership season St Kilda Football Club qualified for the 2008 Premiership Season Finals Series finishing the home and away rounds in the top four in fourth position with 13 wins.

In the 2008 finals series, St Kilda played Geelong in a qualifying final. St Kilda 8.13 (61) lost to Geelong 17.17 (119) in front of 71,653 at the MCG. In the semi-finals St Kilda 17.4 (106) defeated Collingwood 9.18 (72) in front 76,707. In the preliminary finals St Kilda 9.10 (64) lost to Hawthorn 18.10 (118) by 54 points in front of 77,002 at the MC, being knocked out of the finals.

=== 2009 season ===
St Kilda were eliminated from the 2009 NAB Cup in the opening round, with Brisbane 1.8.8 (65) defeating St Kilda 0.8.8 (56).

2009 AFL SEASON
3rd Minor Premiership

In Round 1 of the 2009 Australian Football League season, Zac Dawson made a surprise debut for St Kilda being promoted from the rookie list in time to confront Sydney at Docklands, as St Kilda defenders Matt Maguire and Max Hudghton were injured. St Kilda 12.8 (80) defeated Sydney 9.11 (65) at Docklands Stadium in front of a 32,442 crowd. In Round 2, Adelaide 10.9 (69) lost to St Kilda 15.11 (101) before 41,189 at Football Park. St Kilda 25.11 (161) defeated West Coast 9.10 (64) at Docklands Stadium in front of 29,006. Round 4 saw St Kilda defeat Fremantle by 83 points, and restrict them to 4.4 (28), their second-lowest ever score at that time and the equal-lowest score ever recorded at Dockland Stadium (tied with St Kilda's 3.10 (28) in 2002). In round 5, St Kilda restricted Port Adelaide to their second-lowest score in their club history, going down 15.12 (102) to 5.6 (36). Round 6 saw the Western Bulldogs 11.10 (76) lose to St Kilda 14.20 (104) in front of 36,302 at Docklands Stadium. Round 7 saw St Kilda and Collingwood play a Monday night game, the AFL's first for several seasons. St Kilda won easily 20.8 (128) to Collingwood 5.10 (40), making it the lowest Collingwood score under Mick Malthouse as coach. Round 8 saw St Kilda 13.12 (90) defeat Essendon 10.11 (71) at Etihad Stadium in front of 45,594. Round 9 saw St Kilda 14.13 (97) defeat the Brisbane Lions 13.3 (81) at Docklands Stadium in front of 30,673. In Round 10 St Kilda held Melbourne goalless in the second half of their 37-point victory, St Kilda 11.17 (83) to Melbourne 6.10 (46). In Round 11 St Kilda won its 11th consecutive game, breaking the previous club record of 10 set in 2004 by beating North Melbourne by 46 points, despite trailing by almost five goals in the first quarter. In Round 12 Carlton 14.11 (95) were defeated by St Kilda 16.8 (104) at Docklands Stadium in front of 50,820. In Round 13, St Kilda 13.14 (92) defeated Richmond 5.6 (36) at Docklands Stadium in front 38,196. The Round 14 clash between St Kilda and Geelong broke the previous record of the largest crowd at an AFL game held at Docklands Stadium with an attendance of 54,444. St Kilda 14.7 (91) defeated Geelong 13.7 (85). St Kilda extended its winning streak to 15 wins in round 15, with a hard-fought victory over West Coast 11.4 (70) to St Kilda 13.12 (90). Round 16 saw St Kilda 15.15 (105) defeat Adelaide 7.6 (48) at Etihad Stadium. In Round 17 St Kilda 16.10 (106) defeated Western Bulldogs 9.7 (61) at Etihad Stadium. Round 18 saw Sydney 13.15 (93) defeated by St Kilda 13.15 (94) at the SCG. Round 19 saw Hawthorn 7.7 (49) defeated by St Kilda 10.14 (74) at Aurora Stadium. Round 20 saw St Kildas first loss of the season proper kicking 16.12 (108) to Essendon 16.14 (110) at Etihad Stadium. Round 21 St Kilda 8.11 (59) lost to North Melbourne 10.4 (64) at Etihad Stadium. St Kilda played its first game at the MCG in Round 22 and defeated Melbourne 10.7 (67) to St Kilda 17.12 (114).

=== 2010: Drawn grand final ===
St Kilda reached the final of the 2010 NAB Cup competition with wins over Collingwood in the first round, Sydney in the quarter-finals and Fremantle in the semi-finals. St Kilda were defeated by the Western Bulldogs in the NAB Cup final 16.8 104 to 9.10 64. Stephen Milne produced three goal of the year nominations, in Rounds 5, 11, 13.

The Saints qualified for the 2010 AFL finals in third position with a home and away record of 15 wins, one draw and six losses, the fourth best home and away season record in the club's history.

St Kilda defeated Geelong in the 2nd Qualifying Final at the MCG by four points – 12.11 (83) to 11.13 (79) – to record the club's first ever finals match win over Geelong. St Kilda then defeated the Western Bulldogs by 24 points in the 2nd Preliminary Final – 13.10 (88) to 8.16 (64) to qualify for their second consecutive grand final.

In the 2010 AFL Grand Final on 25 September, the Saints played against the Collingwood Football Club, with the match ending in a draw – 10.8. (68) to 9.14. (68). This was the third drawn grand final in league history and had an attendance of 100,016. St Kilda midfielder Lenny Hayes won the Norm Smith Medal for the player judged the best on ground in the match, making him the first St Kilda player to ever win the medal.

In the Grand Final replay, on 2 October at the MCG, Collingwood won by 56 points.

In December 2010, the club received the keys to their new additional training and administration property in the City of Frankston at Seaford – currently known by its sponsorship name of the Linen House Centre – after its construction was completed at a cost of approximately $9.5 million. As a consequence of the new additional facility being completed – and a cash operating profit after depreciation of $1.69 million in 2010 – the Saints announced a record net profit of $7.467 million for season 2010.

The Saints achieved a new record membership for a season (over 40,000 for the first time), new record home total attendance of 418,098, new record home average attendance for a season, new record total attendance for all matches in a season of 1,151,816 – and averaged 76,628 for all matches at the MCG in 2010 – more than any other team.

=== 2011 season ===
St Kilda reached the semi-finals of the restructured 2011 NAB Cup competition with a win over Brisbane and a draw with Essendon in the pool games in Round 1 then a win over Geelong in the quarter-finals before losing to Essendon in the semi-finals.

The Saints opened their 2011 premiership campaign on 25 March 2011, losing to the Geelong Cats by one point.

St Kilda qualified for the 2011 AFL finals series – for a club record equalling fourth successive season – with a win over North Melbourne at Docklands Stadium by 65 points in Round 23 of the 2011 AFL Premiership Season.

St Kilda played in an elimination final in Week 1 of the finals against Sydney at Docklands Stadium, losing by 25 points. After the elimination final, coach Ross Lyon left the club, despite one year remaining on his contract, to join Fremantle. Former Sydney, Fremantle and West Coast player and Collingwood assistant coach Scott Watters was announced as Lyon's replacement in October 2011.

== Watters and Richardson: 2012–2019 ==
Under their new coach the Saints started the 2012 season with some improvement on 2011, winning three of their first five games, including a 92-point win against the Gold Coast Suns. They finished with 12 wins from 22 games and finished ninth on the ladder, just missing out on the finals for the first time since 2007.

The 2013 season marked a historic moment for the St Kilda Football Club and the AFL with the first home and away season match outside of Australia. The match was held in Wellington, New Zealand, on 25 April (Anzac Day), the day each year on which both Australia and New Zealand commemorate the soldiers from both countries who have fought in conflicts around the world. The match began in the early evening and was held at Westpac Trust Stadium with the Saints hosting the Sydney Swans. The match was played in frigid and slippery conditions. The Saints lost the match by 16 points.

In Round 23, St Kilda hosted Fremantle in what would be the last game for three 200 game players, Stephen Milne, Jason Blake and Justin Koschitzke. The Saints won by 71 points.

St Kilda won five matches for the year and finished 16th on the ladder. On 1 November, senior coach Scott Watters was sacked. On 14 November, former Port Adelaide director of coaching Alan Richardson was announced as new senior coach for the next three years. In the off-season, the Saints trading negotiations resulted in the arrival of Shane Savage, Luke Delaney, Josh Bruce and Billy Longer, while also picking up draft picks 3, 18 and 19, which were used to take Jack Billings, Luke Dunstan and Blake Acres respectively.

St Kilda began 2014 under new coach Richardson with a 17-point win over favourites Melbourne. They followed this with a win over the GWS Giants to start the season 2-0 for the first time since 2010. After a close loss to West Coast and a heavy defeat to Adelaide, the Saints managed to upset top eight favourites Essendon by 16 points. Following this, the Saints lost the next 11 games, including losses by over 80 points to Hawthorn, Collingwood, Geelong and Carlton. On 15 July, Lenny Hayes announced that he would retire at the end of the 2014 season. The following weekend, the Saints beat Fremantle by 58 points at Etihad Stadium in the upset of the season. The Saints then lost the remaining five games to end the season with 4 wins and 18 losses as well as their first wooden spoon since 2000. With pick one in the draft, St Kilda selected key forward Patrick McCartin.

In 2015, the club still struggled to compete with the higher echelons of the competition, however, the team still showed its potential with an eleven-goal comeback against the Western Bulldogs a particular highlight, as well as the emergence of key forward Josh Bruce, who finished the year with 50 goals. 2016 saw the club begin to challenge for the top 8, however despite gaining twelve wins (including victories against Geelong and eventual premiers the Western Bulldogs) and the continued development of the club's young stars, St Kilda finished ninth on the AFL ladder, missing the finals on percentage.

In 2017, St Kilda once again challenged for a spot in the top 8, highlighted by their Round 16 victory over eventual premiers Richmond, in which they recorded an 82-point margin at half time, leading 14.8 (92) to 1.4 (10) before running away to a comfortable 21.12 (138) to 10.11 (71) win. However, after a mid season dip in form which saw them lose three games in a row by over six goals to the Sydney Swans (50 points), the Western Bulldogs (40 points) and the Adelaide Crows (57 points), coupled with late season losses to Melbourne and Richmond, St Kilda's finals chances were dismissed, eventually leading to the Saints finishing the season at 11th place on the ladder with 11 wins and 11 losses. 2017 also ended with the retirements of club greats Nick Riewoldt (336 games), Leigh Montagna (282 games) and Sean Dempster (222 games for Sydney and St Kilda).

The 2018 season saw a drastic fall in the club's form, as the Saints tumbled to 16th place on the ladder with four wins and a draw. Increased scrutiny on Richardson as coach saw the club bring experienced assistants Brett Ratten and Brendon Lade to Moorabbin, along with NRL legend Billy Slater in a leadership role. While 2019 started brightly with four wins from the first five games, the Saints eventually suffered a similar dip in form to the previous year, losing 9 of the next 11 matches. After being advised that his contract would not be renewed for 2020, coach Alan Richardson resigned from his position as senior coach. Ratten took over as caretaker coach and, after winning three of the season's last six games, was appointed permanent senior coach in September 2019.

== Brett Ratten era: 2019–present ==
Despite the coaching change, the Saints ended the 2019 season positively with four high-profile players requesting a trade to the Saints and many discussions held with other players looking to move. During the trade period St Kilda traded a number of picks and acquired Port Adelaide's Dougal Howard and Paddy Ryder, Fremantle's Bradley Hill, Zak Jones from Sydney and Richmond's Dan Butler. Jack Steven, Josh Bruce and Blake Acres were traded to Geelong, Western Bulldogs and Fremantle respectively. The Saints also added to their football department with former player Sean Dempster joining as a fitness coach, while former Hawthorn legend Jarryd Roughead as well as David Rath and Ben Robbins also moved to the club. In the reduced 2020 season, the Saints managed 10 of a possible 17 wins to qualify for their first finals series since 2011.
