= 1965 VFL grand final =

Grand final of the 1965 Victorian Football League season

1965 VFL Grand Final

St Kilda	Essendon
9.16 (70)	14.21 (105)
	1	2	3	4
STK	1.6 (12)	4.8 (32)	5.11 (41)	9.16 (70)
ESS	2.7 (19)	5.10 (40)	10.18 (78)	14.21 (105)
- Date: 25 September 1965
- Stadium: Melbourne Cricket Ground
- Attendance: 104,846
- Favourite: St Kilda

The 1965 VFL Grand Final was an Australian rules football game contested between the Essendon Football Club and St Kilda Football Club, held at the Melbourne Cricket Ground in Melbourne on 25 September 1965. It was the 68th annual grand final of the Victorian Football League, staged to determine the premiers for the 1965 VFL season. The match, attended by 104,846 spectators, was won by Essendon by a margin of 35 points, marking that club's 12th premiership victory.

St Kilda were minor premiers for the first time in their history and, after beating Collingwood by a point in the semi-final, found themselves competing in just their second-ever grand final and first since 1913, which they lost to Fitzroy. Essendon, on the other hand, last won a premiership three years previously.

The Bombers set up their win in the third quarter, scoring five goals to just one by the Saints. Ted Fordham kicked seven goals for Essendon.

The game's broadcast was presumed lost for many years. However, the ABC was able to locate an archived copy of the game decades after.

The match was the first ever broadcast of an Australian rules football match in Sydney and Canberra. It remains as of 2026 the most recent Essendon victory in a grand final without Kevin Sheedy as coach.

== Teams ==
St Kilda	Essendon

St Kilda
B:	1 Rodger Head	6 Bob Murray	18 Kevin Neale
HB:	17 Brian Sierakowski	9 Ian Synman	25 Daryl Griffiths
C:	7 Jim Read	5 Ian Stewart	36 Bruce McMaster-Smith
HF:	15 Ian Cooper	4 Darrel Baldock (c)	17 Ray Cross
F:	8 Alan Morrow	16 Verdun Howell	3 Ross Smith
Foll:	10 Carl Ditterich	20 Des Kennedy	26 Ian Rowland
Res:	14 Bob Morton	24 Kevin Roberts	
Coach:	Allan Jeans		

Essendon
B:	2 Darryl Gerlach	18 Greg Brown	8 Charlie Payne
HB:	32 Barry Davis	10 Ian Shelton	21 Geoff Pryor
C:	28 Alec Epis	1 Jack Clarke	14 Russell Blew
HF:	16 Graeme Johnston	23 Ken Fraser (c)	6 Geoff Gosper
F:	34 Brian Sampson	20 Ted Fordham	4 David Shaw
Foll:	24 Don McKenzie	31 Hugh Mitchell	11 John Birt
Res:	27 Bruce Waite	43 Kevin Egan	
Coach:	John Coleman		

== Statistics ==
=== Goalkickers ===
Essendon:

- Fordham 7
- Gosper 2
- Sampson 2
- Birt 1
- Fraser 1
- Mitchell 1

St Kilda:

- Howell 3
- Baldock 2
- Rowland 2
- Roberts 1
- Smith 1

=== Attendance ===
- MCG crowd – 104,846

2

== See also ==
- 1965 VFL season
