= 1966 VFL grand final =

Grand final of the 1966 Victorian Football League season

1966 VFL Grand Final

Collingwood	St Kilda
10.13 (73)	10.14 (74)
	1	2	3	4
COLL	2.1 (13)	5.7 (37)	7.11 (53)	10.13 (73)
STK	2.5 (17)	5.6 (36)	8.9 (57)	10.14 (74)
- Date: 24 September 1966
- Stadium: Melbourne Cricket Ground
- Attendance: 101,655
- Umpires: Jeff Crouch

Accolades
- Jock McHale Medallist: Allan Jeans

Broadcast in Australia
- Network: Seven Network
- Commentators: "Butch" Gale; Ted Whitten; Mike Williamson

The 1966 VFL Grand Final was an Australian rules football game contested between the Collingwood Football Club and St Kilda Football Club, held at the Melbourne Cricket Ground in Melbourne on 24 September 1966. It was the 69th annual grand final of the Victorian Football League (VFL), staged to determine the premiers for the 1966 VFL season. The match, attended by 101,655 spectators, was won by St Kilda by a margin of one point, marking that club's first and only premiership victory to date.

== Background ==
Both St Kilda and Collingwood were coming off consecutive VFL Grand final defeats: the Magpies in 1964 against Melbourne and the Saints after losing the previous year to Essendon. In a thrilling finish to the home-and-away season, Collingwood finished minor premiers after easily beating Footscray at Victoria Park, while St Kilda, Geelong, Essendon and Richmond fought for the remaining three qualifying spots. St Kilda managed to hold on to second place in a thrilling contest against Hawthorn at Moorabbin, while Geelong and Essendon also won their games, which meant that Richmond would miss the finals despite its big win over Fitzroy.

== Teams ==
St Kilda	Collingwood

St Kilda
B:	1 Rodger Head	6 Bob Murray	13 Brian Sierakowski
HB:	16 Verdun Howell	9 Ian Synman	24 John Bingley
C:	36 Jeff Moran	5 Ian Stewart	21 Jim Read
HF:	15 Ian Cooper	4 Darrel Baldock (c)	27 Barry Breen
F:	8 Alan Morrow	18 Kevin Neale	19 Allan Davis
Foll:	2 Brian Mynott	25 Daryl Griffiths	3 Ross Smith
Res:	31 Travis Payze	22 Kevin Billing	
Coach:	Allan Jeans		

Collingwood
B:	35 Ian Montgomery	8 Peter Boyne	5 Terry Waters
HB:	13 Laurie Hill	15 Ted Potter	33 Lee Adamson
C:	17 Peter Patterson	9 Colin Tully	12 Errol Hutchesson
HF:	1 Des Tuddenham (c)	16 Doug Searl	21 Max Pitt
F:	3 Ray Gabelich	7 Ian Graham	36 Gary Wallis
Foll:	28 Len Thompson	29 Kevin Rose	18 Wayne Richardson
Res:	2 Trevor Steer	4 John Henderson	
Coach:	Bob Rose		

Umpire – Jeff Crouch

== Match summary ==
Twenty-five minutes into the final quarter and with scores level, Collingwood's Wayne Richardson had a shot at goal on the run but kicked it out of bounds on the full. St Kilda then began to work the ball out of defence after winning the boundary throw-in. A kick from Ian Cooper saw the ball make its way to centre half-forward. Collingwood defender Ted Potter failed to mark the ball low down, and with the players scrummaging for the ball, a bounce was called. Brian Mynott won the tap for the Saints, but it was intercepted by Potter, who was quickly tackled. Potter, however, managed to get out a handball, but it found its way to St Kilda's Barry Breen, who snapped at goal and kicked a behind to put his side in front. With about a minute left on the clock, Collingwood were able to work the ball towards their forward line. St Kilda's Bob Murray, however, was able to take a mark at centre half-back, and the siren sounded after he kicked the ball towards the wing. St Kilda had held on to win by one point.

After the game, the players swapped guernseys, which was a tradition at the time for grand finals. There is an infamous photo of St Kilda captain Darrel Baldock swapping guernseys with Collingwood captain Des Tuddenham. Later versions of the photo would be doctored to show Baldock and Tuddenham wearing their own guernseys. Ian Synman was the only St Kilda player not to swap his jumper with a Collingwood opponent.

Fred Farrell, the St Kilda timekeeper, blew the final siren for more than ten seconds, and described the final seconds of the game as the highlight of his timekeeping career.

According to Peter Clark of The Footy Almanac, St Kilda's Ian Cooper was best on ground.

== Scorecard ==
1966 VFL Grand Final
Saturday, 24 September 2:50pm	Collingwood	def. by	St Kilda	MCG (crowd: 101,655)
2.1 (13); 5.7 (37); 7.11 (53); 10.13 (73)	Q1; Q2; Q3; Final	2.5 (17); 5.6 (36); 8.9 (57); 10.14 (74)	Umpires: Crouch; Television broadcast: Seven Network
Tuddenham 3 Gabelich, Richardson 2 Graham, Pitt, Wallis 1	Goals	5 Neale; 2 Baldock; 1 Cooper, Griffiths, Moran
Waters, Richardson, Thompson, Patterson, Pitt, Tuddenham	Best	Cooper, Stewart, Sierakowski, Griffiths, Breen, Morrow, Neale

== See also ==
- 1966 VFL season
- 2010 AFL Grand Final
