= 1966 VFL season =

70th season of the Victorian Football League (VFL)

1966 VFL premiership season
- Teams: 12
- Premiers: St Kilda; 1st premiership
- Minor premiers: Collingwood; 13th minor premiership
- Consolation series: North Melbourne; 2nd Consolation series win
- Brownlow Medallist: Ian Stewart (St Kilda)
- Coleman Medallist: Ted Fordham (Essendon)
- Matches played: 112
- Highest: 102,055

The 1966 VFL season was the 70th season of the Victorian Football League (VFL), the highest level senior Australian rules football competition in Victoria. The season featured twelve clubs, ran from 23 April until 24 September, and comprised an 18-game home-and-away season followed by a finals series featuring the top four clubs.

The premiership was won by the St Kilda Football Club, after it defeated Collingwood by one point in the VFL Grand Final. It was St Kilda's first, and to date only premiership, making it the last of the eight foundation clubs to win a premiership.

== Background ==
In 1966, the VFL competition consisted of twelve teams of 18 on-the-field players each, plus two substitute players, known as the 19th man and the 20th man. A player could be substituted for any reason; however, once substituted, a player could not return to the field of play under any circumstances.

Teams played each other in a home-and-away season of 18 rounds; matches 12 to 18 were the "home-and-way reverse" of matches 1 to 7.

Once the 18 round home-and-away season had finished, the 1966 VFL Premiers were determined by the specific format and conventions of the Page–McIntyre system.

== Home-and-away season ==
=== Round 1 ===
Home team	Home team score	Away team	Away team score	Venue	Crowd	Date
Essendon	11.6 (72)	Geelong	9.4 (58)	Windy Hill	31,560	23 April 1966
Collingwood	17.13 (115)	Hawthorn	9.8 (62)	Victoria Park	32,741	23 April 1966
South Melbourne	16.19 (115)	Fitzroy	9.8 (62)	Lake Oval	22,376	23 April 1966
Melbourne	4.9 (33)	St Kilda	17.7 (109)	MCG	64,934	25 April 1966
Footscray	11.9 (75)	North Melbourne	13.9 (87)	Western Oval	23,252	25 April 1966
Carlton	14.16 (100)	Richmond	16.10 (106)	Princes Park	43,695	25 April 1966

=== Round 2 ===
Home team	Home team score	Away team	Away team score	Venue	Crowd	Date
Hawthorn	7.14 (56)	Melbourne	3.11 (29)	Glenferrie Oval	14,000	30 April 1966
Geelong	13.16 (94)	South Melbourne	11.8 (74)	Kardinia Park	21,490	30 April 1966
Richmond	17.15 (117)	Footscray	5.17 (47)	MCG	28,596	30 April 1966
North Melbourne	5.13 (43)	Essendon	12.20 (92)	Arden Street Oval	19,813	30 April 1966
Fitzroy	5.12 (42)	Collingwood	9.17 (71)	Brunswick Street Oval	20,362	30 April 1966
St Kilda	15.17 (107)	Carlton	7.12 (54)	Moorabbin Oval	30,810	30 April 1966

=== Round 3 ===
Home team	Home team score	Away team	Away team score	Venue	Crowd	Date
North Melbourne	9.13 (67)	St Kilda	15.13 (103)	Arden Street Oval	17,261	7 May 1966
Richmond	18.15 (123)	Melbourne	11.14 (80)	MCG	32,608	7 May 1966
South Melbourne	14.22 (106)	Hawthorn	7.15 (57)	Lake Oval	17,259	7 May 1966
Geelong	12.14 (86)	Footscray	7.4 (46)	Kardinia Park	17,395	7 May 1966
Essendon	8.18 (66)	Collingwood	8.6 (54)	Windy Hill	43,487	7 May 1966
Fitzroy	6.8 (44)	Carlton	10.16 (76)	Brunswick Street Oval	16,714	7 May 1966

=== Round 4 ===
Home team	Home team score	Away team	Away team score	Venue	Crowd	Date
Melbourne	12.17 (89)	South Melbourne	17.17 (119)	MCG	31,497	14 May 1966
Hawthorn	9.13 (67)	North Melbourne	14.15 (99)	Glenferrie Oval	10,873	14 May 1966
Collingwood	12.13 (85)	Richmond	5.18 (48)	Victoria Park	40,272	14 May 1966
Carlton	15.12 (102)	Essendon	5.11 (41)	Princes Park	31,819	14 May 1966
St Kilda	15.11 (101)	Geelong	7.16 (58)	Moorabbin Oval	37,140	14 May 1966
Footscray	12.12 (84)	Fitzroy	5.16 (46)	Western Oval	14,672	14 May 1966

=== Round 5 ===
Home team	Home team score	Away team	Away team score	Venue	Crowd	Date
Geelong	12.8 (80)	Richmond	15.8 (98)	Kardinia Park	21,655	21 May 1966
Footscray	10.10 (70)	Hawthorn	4.10 (34)	Western Oval	12,424	21 May 1966
South Melbourne	7.11 (53)	St Kilda	13.17 (95)	Lake Oval	33,255	21 May 1966
Fitzroy	9.10 (64)	Essendon	17.11 (113)	Brunswick Street Oval	15,279	21 May 1966
North Melbourne	7.4 (46)	Collingwood	11.15 (81)	Arden Street Oval	21,293	21 May 1966
Melbourne	3.14 (32)	Carlton	11.13 (79)	MCG	35,955	21 May 1966

=== Round 6 ===
Home team	Home team score	Away team	Away team score	Venue	Crowd	Date
Richmond	12.16 (88)	South Melbourne	9.9 (63)	MCG	45,254	28 May 1966
Essendon	15.15 (105)	Hawthorn	12.9 (81)	Windy Hill	15,400	28 May 1966
Collingwood	12.18 (90)	Melbourne	8.9 (57)	Victoria Park	26,153	28 May 1966
Carlton	11.13 (79)	Footscray	6.10 (46)	Princes Park	23,598	28 May 1966
North Melbourne	8.7 (55)	Geelong	12.20 (92)	Arden Street Oval	15,290	28 May 1966
St Kilda	17.16 (118)	Fitzroy	8.6 (54)	Moorabbin Oval	19,737	28 May 1966

=== Round 7 ===
Home team	Home team score	Away team	Away team score	Venue	Crowd	Date
Hawthorn	11.12 (78)	St Kilda	15.12 (102)	Glenferrie Oval	18,755	4 June 1966
Fitzroy	12.6 (78)	Richmond	15.12 (102)	Brunswick Street Oval	14,338	4 June 1966
South Melbourne	17.16 (118)	North Melbourne	15.16 (106)	Lake Oval	15,800	4 June 1966
Melbourne	14.10 (94)	Essendon	9.6 (60)	MCG	38,498	4 June 1966
Footscray	6.12 (48)	Collingwood	8.20 (68)	Western Oval	23,721	4 June 1966
Geelong	8.9 (57)	Carlton	8.8 (56)	Kardinia Park	25,398	4 June 1966

=== Round 8 ===
Home team	Home team score	Away team	Away team score	Venue	Crowd	Date
Footscray	11.5 (71)	Melbourne	7.8 (50)	Western Oval	15,983	11 June 1966
Collingwood	14.21 (105)	Geelong	11.10 (76)	Victoria Park	37,034	11 June 1966
Carlton	7.15 (57)	South Melbourne	8.6 (54)	Princes Park	26,510	11 June 1966
Fitzroy	8.13 (61)	Hawthorn	11.14 (80)	Brunswick Street Oval	12,987	13 June 1966
Richmond	10.11 (71)	North Melbourne	8.23 (71)	MCG	33,959	13 June 1966
St Kilda	8.8 (56)	Essendon	7.7 (49)	Moorabbin Oval	50,548	13 June 1966

=== Round 9 ===
Home team	Home team score	Away team	Away team score	Venue	Crowd	Date
Richmond	16.13 (109)	St Kilda	11.8 (74)	MCG	55,426	18 June 1966
Essendon	9.17 (71)	Footscray	4.13 (37)	Windy Hill	18,600	18 June 1966
North Melbourne	9.11 (65)	Melbourne	4.12 (36)	Arden Street Oval	8,957	18 June 1966
Geelong	20.24 (144)	Fitzroy	5.1 (31)	Kardinia Park	13,550	18 June 1966
South Melbourne	11.7 (73)	Collingwood	13.20 (98)	Lake Oval	25,100	18 June 1966
Hawthorn	9.13 (67)	Carlton	9.9 (63)	Glenferrie Oval	19,500	18 June 1966

=== Round 10 ===
Home team	Home team score	Away team	Away team score	Venue	Crowd	Date
Geelong	17.15 (117)	Hawthorn	8.9 (57)	Kardinia Park	13,941	25 June 1966
Footscray	8.19 (67)	South Melbourne	8.7 (55)	Western Oval	11,733	25 June 1966
Essendon	14.16 (100)	Richmond	15.6 (96)	Windy Hill	20,600	25 June 1966
Collingwood	17.15 (117)	St Kilda	6.9 (45)	Victoria Park	37,607	25 June 1966
Melbourne	11.17 (83)	Fitzroy	3.7 (25)	MCG	14,688	25 June 1966
North Melbourne	8.17 (65)	Carlton	6.6 (42)	Arden Street Oval	10,573	25 June 1966

=== Round 11 ===
Home team	Home team score	Away team	Away team score	Venue	Crowd	Date
Fitzroy	10.7 (67)	North Melbourne	22.8 (140)	Brunswick Street Oval	9,351	2 July 1966
Melbourne	9.21 (75)	Geelong	13.15 (93)	MCG	39,217	2 July 1966
St Kilda	15.15 (105)	Footscray	7.12 (54)	Moorabbin Oval	21,507	2 July 1966
Hawthorn	6.13 (49)	Richmond	11.13 (79)	Glenferrie Oval	15,880	9 July 1966
Carlton	7.11 (53)	Collingwood	6.6 (42)	Princes Park	29,240	9 July 1966
South Melbourne	12.10 (82)	Essendon	13.12 (90)	Lake Oval	22,750	9 July 1966

=== Round 12 ===
Home team	Home team score	Away team	Away team score	Venue	Crowd	Date
Fitzroy	8.5 (53)	South Melbourne	10.15 (75)	Brunswick Street Oval	6,936	16 July 1966
St Kilda	12.13 (85)	Melbourne	6.6 (42)	Moorabbin Oval	15,003	16 July 1966
North Melbourne	10.15 (75)	Footscray	6.6 (42)	Arden Street Oval	8,114	16 July 1966
Geelong	15.7 (97)	Essendon	5.7 (37)	Kardinia Park	23,114	16 July 1966
Hawthorn	5.7 (37)	Collingwood	16.14 (110)	Glenferrie Oval	13,990	16 July 1966
Richmond	8.13 (61)	Carlton	4.6 (30)	MCG	38,094	16 July 1966

=== Round 13 ===
Home team	Home team score	Away team	Away team score	Venue	Crowd	Date
Footscray	7.15 (57)	Richmond	11.16 (82)	Western Oval	16,573	23 July 1966
Essendon	6.16 (52)	North Melbourne	6.6 (42)	Windy Hill	19,400	23 July 1966
Collingwood	19.14 (128)	Fitzroy	9.7 (61)	Victoria Park	18,094	23 July 1966
Carlton	7.15 (57)	St Kilda	5.11 (41)	Princes Park	33,367	23 July 1966
Melbourne	23.13 (151)	Hawthorn	9.5 (59)	MCG	18,254	23 July 1966
South Melbourne	9.11 (65)	Geelong	9.17 (71)	Lake Oval	20,100	23 July 1966

=== Round 14 ===
Home team	Home team score	Away team	Away team score	Venue	Crowd	Date
Melbourne	10.12 (72)	Richmond	14.13 (97)	MCG	35,460	30 July 1966
Hawthorn	10.16 (76)	South Melbourne	14.17 (101)	Glenferrie Oval	12,237	30 July 1966
Footscray	7.9 (51)	Geelong	10.11 (71)	Western Oval	16,951	30 July 1966
Collingwood	7.10 (52)	Essendon	18.9 (117)	Victoria Park	38,918	30 July 1966
Carlton	12.15 (87)	Fitzroy	9.6 (60)	Princes Park	15,203	30 July 1966
St Kilda	10.18 (78)	North Melbourne	4.16 (40)	Moorabbin Oval	30,530	30 July 1966

=== Round 15 ===
Home team	Home team score	Away team	Away team score	Venue	Crowd	Date
Geelong	14.11 (95)	St Kilda	10.12 (72)	Kardinia Park	28,729	6 August 1966
Fitzroy	13.17 (95)	Footscray	13.11 (89)	Brunswick Street Oval	8,795	6 August 1966
South Melbourne	18.17 (125)	Melbourne	15.19 (109)	Lake Oval	14,200	6 August 1966
North Melbourne	11.16 (82)	Hawthorn	12.11 (83)	Arden Street Oval	5,835	6 August 1966
Richmond	13.8 (86)	Collingwood	16.9 (105)	MCG	73,834	6 August 1966
Essendon	18.7 (115)	Carlton	10.13 (73)	Windy Hill	28,000	6 August 1966

=== Round 16 ===
Home team	Home team score	Away team	Away team score	Venue	Crowd	Date
St Kilda	19.19 (133)	South Melbourne	10.6 (66)	Moorabbin Oval	20,083	13 August 1966
Essendon	14.9 (93)	Fitzroy	6.9 (45)	Windy Hill	14,600	13 August 1966
Collingwood	12.21 (93)	North Melbourne	6.8 (44)	Victoria Park	19,900	13 August 1966
Carlton	14.15 (99)	Melbourne	10.10 (70)	Princes Park	13,127	13 August 1966
Richmond	6.12 (48)	Geelong	11.16 (82)	MCG	54,976	13 August 1966
Hawthorn	18.11 (119)	Footscray	9.13 (67)	Glenferrie Oval	8,429	13 August 1966

=== Round 17 ===
Home team	Home team score	Away team	Away team score	Venue	Crowd	Date
Geelong	17.16 (118)	North Melbourne	11.13 (79)	Kardinia Park	19,654	20 August 1966
Fitzroy	5.10 (40)	St Kilda	17.22 (124)	Brunswick Street Oval	12,165	20 August 1966
South Melbourne	10.11 (71)	Richmond	10.12 (72)	Lake Oval	20,200	20 August 1966
Hawthorn	11.13 (79)	Essendon	15.10 (100)	Glenferrie Oval	21,520	20 August 1966
Melbourne	12.12 (84)	Collingwood	21.15 (141)	MCG	46,319	20 August 1966
Footscray	4.1 (25)	Carlton	12.14 (86)	Western Oval	14,516	20 August 1966

=== Round 18 ===
Home team	Home team score	Away team	Away team score	Venue	Crowd	Date
North Melbourne	12.16 (88)	South Melbourne	11.5 (71)	Arden Street Oval	10,419	27 August 1966
Essendon	11.18 (84)	Melbourne	7.7 (49)	Windy Hill	22,200	27 August 1966
Collingwood	18.24 (132)	Footscray	3.10 (28)	Victoria Park	20,324	27 August 1966
Carlton	5.10 (40)	Geelong	16.14 (110)	Princes Park	37,236	27 August 1966
St Kilda	14.9 (93)	Hawthorn	13.5 (83)	Moorabbin Oval	23,860	27 August 1966
Richmond	20.23 (143)	Fitzroy	11.10 (76)	MCG	18,980	27 August 1966

== Ladder ==
(P)	Premiers
	Qualified for finals

#	Team	P	W	L	D	PF	PA	%	Pts
1	Collingwood	18	15	3	0	1687	1073	157.2	60
2	St Kilda (P)	18	14	4	0	1641	1149	142.8	56
3	Geelong	18	14	4	0	1599	1162	137.6	56
4	Essendon	18	14	4	0	1457	1204	121.0	56
5	Richmond	18	13	4	1	1626	1320	123.2	54
6	Carlton	18	10	8	0	1233	1143	107.9	40
7	North Melbourne	18	7	10	1	1294	1381	93.7	30
8	South Melbourne	18	7	11	0	1486	1505	98.7	28
9	Hawthorn	18	5	13	0	1224	1650	74.2	20
10	Footscray	18	4	14	0	1004	1458	68.9	16
11	Melbourne	18	3	15	0	1235	1580	78.2	12
12	Fitzroy	18	1	17	0	1004	1865	53.8	4

Rules for classification: 1. premiership points; 2. percentage; 3. points for
Average score: 76.3
Source: AFL Tables

== Finals series ==
=== Semi-finals ===
Team	1 Qtr	2 Qtr	3 Qtr	Final
Geelong	3.4	3.5	7.9	12.14 (86)
Essendon	6.1	10.5	13.6	15.6 (96)
Attendance: 93,765

Second Semi-final
10 September 2:30pm	Collingwood	def.	St Kilda	MCG (crowd: 95,614)
5.2 (32); 6.3 (39); 10.5 (65); 15.9 (99)	Q1; Q2; Q3; Final	0.1 (1); 6.5 (41); 10.9 (69); 13.11 (89)	Umpires: L. Perkins; Television broadcast: Seven Network
Tuddenham 7 Searl, Wallis, Graham 2 Richardson, Price 1	Goals	3 Payze; 2 Smith, Baldock, Neale; 1 Mynott, Oakley, Cooper, Breen
Waters, Tuddenham, Wallis, Potter, K. Rose, Patterson, Clark, Montgomery, W. Richardson	Best	Murray, Morrow, Cooper, Breen, Smith, Payze, Griffiths, Synman

=== Preliminary final ===
Team	1 Qtr	2 Qtr	3 Qtr	Final
St Kilda	4.1	10.2	10.2	15.4 (94)
Essendon	2.4	3.4	3.9	7.10 (52)
Attendance: 93,453

=== Grand final ===
Team	1 Qtr	2 Qtr	3 Qtr	Final
Collingwood	2.1	5.7	7.11	10.13 (73)
St Kilda	2.5	5.6	8.9	10.14 (74)
Attendance: 102,055

== Night Series Competition ==
The night series were held under the floodlights at Lake Oval, South Melbourne, for the teams (5th to 12th on ladder) out of the finals at the end of the season.

Final: North Melbourne 20.12 (132) defeated Hawthorn 12.7 (79).

== Season notes ==
- At pre-season training in mid-April, at the behest of Collingwood coach Bob Rose, Collingwood club secretary Jack Burns informed Duncan Wright that his services were no longer required at Collingwood. (See Duncan Wright and John Somerville.)
- Richmond, under coach Tom Hafey, trained pre-season with Percy Cerutty at his facilities in Portsea, Victoria.
- In the Round 14 match between Carlton and Fitzroy, there was a once-off trial of a rule to ease congestion at centre bounces: a rectangle measuring 30yds goal-to-goal and 50yds wing-to-wing was drawn in the centre of the ground, and no more than four players from each team were permitted within the rectangle at a centre bounce. The rule was trialled again, with the area expanded to a 50yd square, during the Night Series, and it was eventually introduced as a permanent rule change in 1973.
- In Round 17, Fitzroy hosted its last senior VFL match at the Brunswick Street Oval, its home ground since 1883. A total of 612 VFL matches were played at the venue, including four finals games. Fitzroy began its nomadic journey of playing at various grounds over the next thirty years following its departure from Brunswick Street: Princes Park (twice), Junction Oval, Victoria Park, and Western (Whitten) Oval.
- After the home-and-away season was finished, Richmond's reserves and under-19s teams were stripped of any premiership points earned in matches in which they fielded Frank Loughran, an unregistered player from the Latrobe Valley. The reserves team, which went through the entire season undefeated, was stripped of twelve premiership points; it fell from first to second on the ladder, but still went on to win the premiership. The under-19s team was stripped of 28 premiership points, and dropped out of the final four as a result.
- At the end of the season South Melbourne's captain-coach, Bob Skilton, resigned as coach in the belief that he could do more for the club by continuing to lead the players on the field.

== Awards ==
- The 1966 VFL Premiership team was St. Kilda (its first, and to date, only premiership since the VFL's formation in 1897).
- The VFL's leading goalkicker was Ted Fordham of Essendon who kicked 76 goals (including 3 goals in the final series).
- The winner of the 1966 Brownlow Medal was Ian Stewart of St Kilda with 21 votes.
- Fitzroy took the "wooden spoon" in 1966.
- The reserves premiership was won by Richmond. Richmond 14.11 (95) defeated Collingwood 13.12 (90) in the Grand Final, held as a curtain-raiser to the seniors Grand Final at the Melbourne Cricket Ground on 24 September.

== Sources ==
- 1966 VFL season at AFL Tables
- 1966 VFL season at Australian Football
