= Shirt swapping =

Tradition in sports

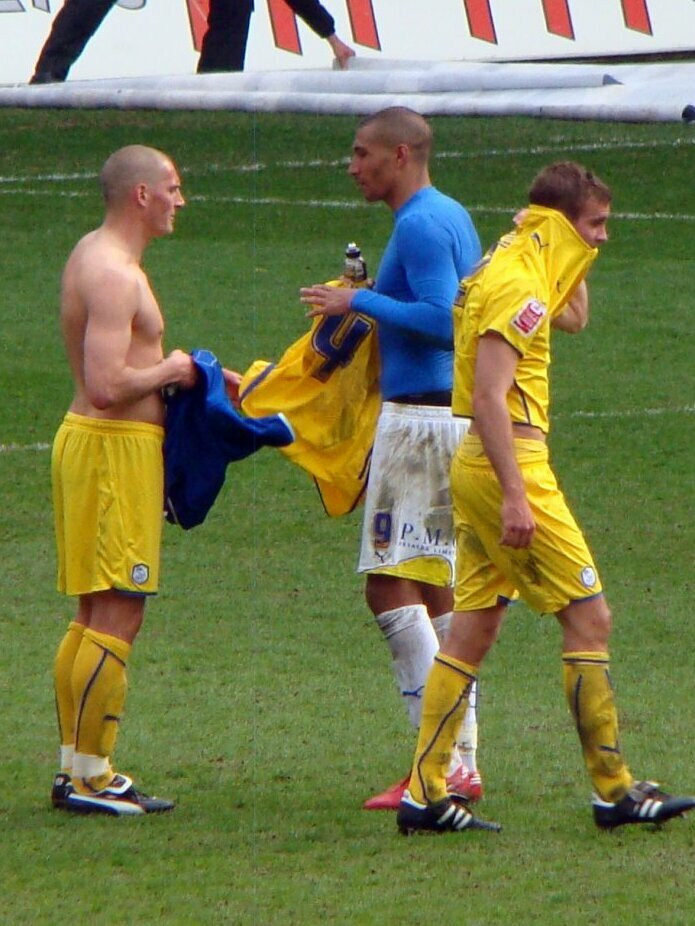
Two players swap shirts after a match in Cardiff, Wales

Shirt swapping or jersey swapping is a tradition in sports where players of opposing teams swap jerseys with each other at the end of a match as a sign of mutual respect.

== Association football ==
Shirt swapping is a long-held tradition in association football.

The first shirt swap is believed to have taken place at a match between France and England on May 14, 1931; the French team lost and asked to keep the English team's shirts as a memento.

A further example took place at the 1954 FIFA World Cup.

In the 1970 FIFA World Cup, Pelé and Bobby Moore swapped shirts. Following this, the tradition spread to other individual players.

Although habitually done at the conclusion of matches, shirt swaps have also occurred at half time; examples include Mario Balotelli swapping shirts with Pepe in 2014, Eden Hazard swapping shirts with Ángel Di María in 2016, and Mohamed Ali Camara swapping shirts with Erling Haaland in 2023.

== Other sports ==
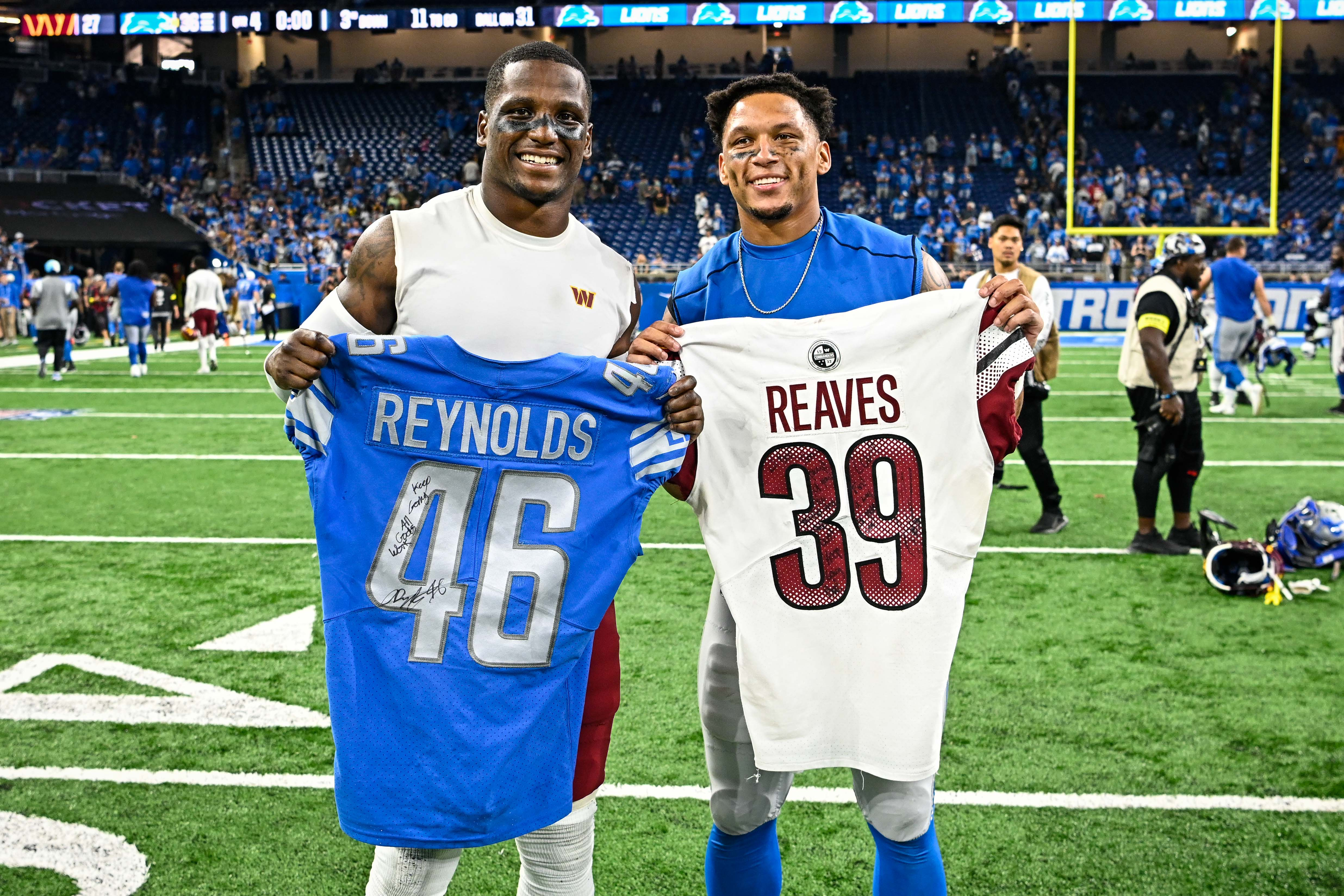
Two American football players swap jerseys after a game

Jersey swapping also occurs in the National Football League, where it has become common since the mid-2010s, getting the tradition from association football. Then-Giants wide receiver Odell Beckham Jr. is credited with starting the trend in the NFL during his rookie season in 2014, eventually becoming popular in the NBA as well.

During his final season in the National Basketball Association in 2018–19, basketball player Dwyane Wade exchanged jerseys after every game with a player on the opposing team.

Jersey swapping has also occurred in Major League Baseball. Joe Kelly swapped his jersey with a Mariachi musician for his charro jacket in celebration of his Mexican heritage and wore it to the Los Angeles Dodgers' championship trip to the White House following their victory in the 2020 World Series.

In Australian rules football, guernsey swapping was common in grand finals from as early as the 1940s until around the 1980s. In the Victorian Football League, this infamously meant that photographs of St Kilda celebrating its only premiership in 1966 featured captain Darrel Baldock hoisting the trophy wearing a Collingwood guernsey; St Kilda later doctored the photo to put him back in a St Kilda guernsey in murals and promotional material it created with the image. The VFL banned the captains from swapping guernseys after 1966, and the custom ultimately fell out of vogue. Decades later, long-retired players often handed swapped guernseys back to their original wearers.

== Outside of sports ==
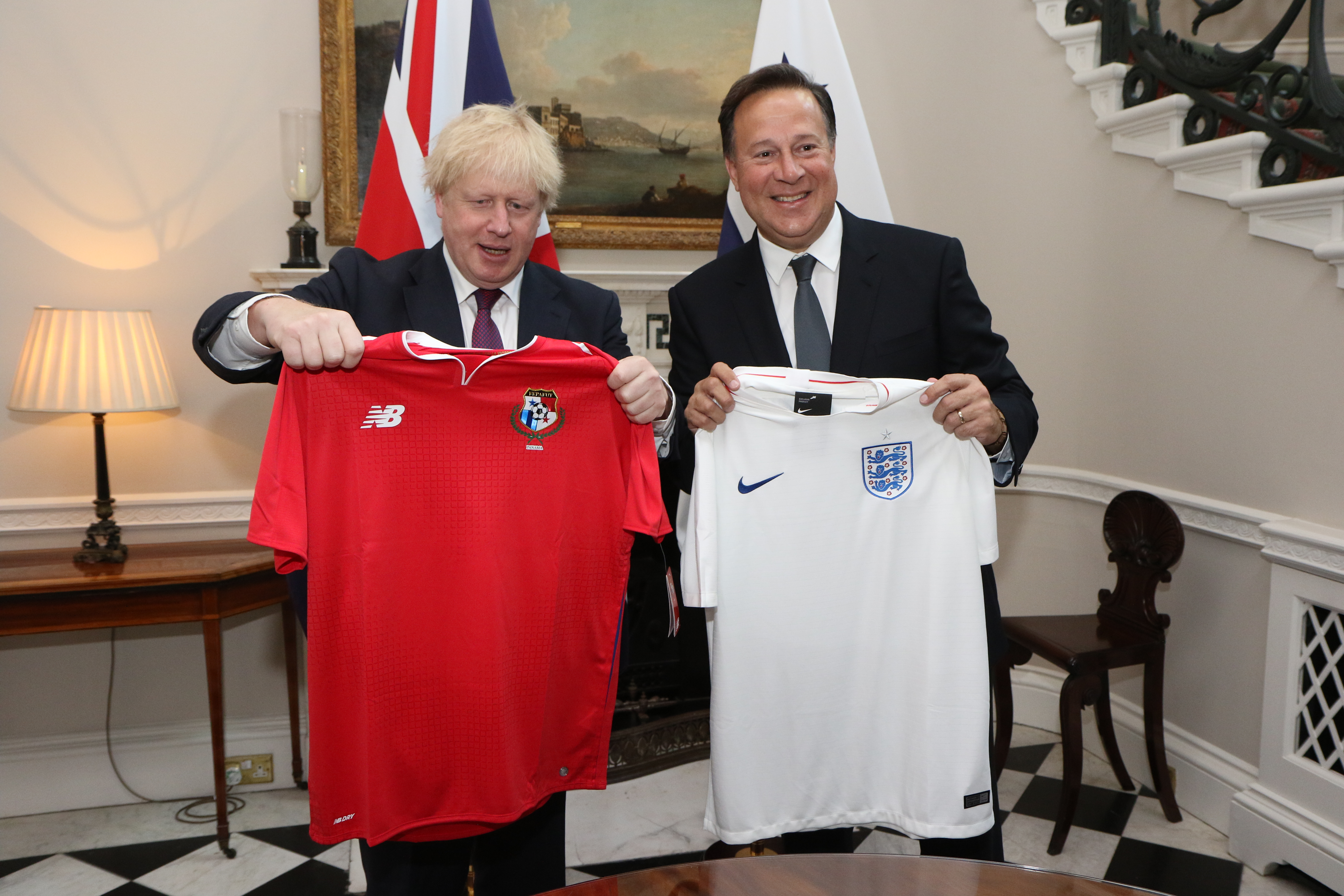
Boris Johnson with Juan Carlos Varela in London in 2018

Politicians sometimes swap shirts as acts of diplomacy, often before their respective teams play against each other. One instance was British foreign secretary Boris Johnson (representing the UK country of England) swapping national team jerseys with Panamanian president Juan Carlos Varela before their countries faced each other in the 2018 FIFA World Cup.

== Notable shirt swapping ==
Competition	Matches		Players		Description
1966 VFL Season	1966 VFL Grand Final	Collingwood vs St Kilda	Des Tuddenham	Darrel Baldock	As of 2024, the 1966 premiership is St Kilda's only VFL/AFL premiership, and there is an infamous photo of St Kilda's Darrel Baldock raising the premiership cup wearing Collingwood's Des Tuddenham's guernsey.
1970 FIFA World Cup	Group stage	Brazil vs England	(Brazil) Pelé	(England) Bobby Moore	Regarded as a symbol of fair play in association football.
2022 FIFA World Cup	Round of 16	Argentina vs Australia	(Argentina) Lionel Messi	(Australia) Cameron Devlin	Shirt worn in Messi's 1000th match

== See also ==
- Association football culture
