= Des Tuddenham =

Australian rules footballer and coach

Personal information
- Full name: Desmond Vincent Tuddenham
- Born: 29 January 1943 (age 83); Ross Creek, Victoria
- Original team: Ballarat YCW
- Height: 180 cm (5 ft 11 in)
- Weight: 84 kg (185 lb)

Playing career^{1}
Years	Club	Games (Goals)
1962–1971	Collingwood	169 (234)
1972–1975	Essendon	69 (66)
1976–1977	Collingwood	13 (17)
Total		251 (317)

Representative team honours
Years	Team	Games (Goals)
	Victoria	5 (2)

Coaching career^{3}
Years	Club	Games (W–L–D)
1972–1975	Essendon	90 (47–43–0)
1978	South Melbourne	22 (9–13–0)
Total		112 (56–56–0)
- ^{1} Playing statistics correct to the end of 1977.^{3} Coaching statistics correct as of 1978.

Career highlights
- Collingwood best and fairest 1963; Collingwood captain 1966–1969, 1976; Victoria captain 1971; Essendon captain-coach 1972–1975; Collingwood Team of the Century (ruck-rover); Australian Football Hall of Fame 2008

Desmond Vincent Tuddenham (born 29 January 1943) is a former Australian rules footballer who played for Collingwood and Essendon in the Victorian Football League (VFL) during the 1960s and 1970s.

== Early life ==
Tuddenham was born and raised in Ross Creek, Victoria, a country town near Ballarat. He and his twin brother, Basil, were two of a large family consisting of nine children (seven boys and two girls) to parents William and Anne Tuddenham.

Tuddenham's upbringing was typical of country footballers who came from farming families. Before and after school and during weekends, he had to help with various farm chores. Sport, usually football or cricket, was played on Saturday, and the family attended church on Sundays. The daily grind of farm work helped to strengthen Tuddenham's shoulders and arms, and a fanatical attitude to fitness hardened his body.

Tuddenham played cricket with five of his brothers for Ross Creek, and football for the Young Christian Worker's club in Ballarat. In the space of three seasons, he went from the under-14s to the under-19s side, and won the league's best and fairest trophy at 16. This attracted the attention of several VFL clubs.

== Football career ==
Tuddenham made his VFL debut in 1962 against North Melbourne at Arden Street Oval. His brand of football was fearless and tough, with a habit of grasping the football to his chest with his elbows sticking out dangerously. In recognition of his toughness and skills, Tuddenham was appointed Collingwood captain in 1966. In the semi-final against St Kilda, he kicked seven goals on Daryl Griffiths in a tense 10-point win to advance to the grand final. But St Kilda reversed the result two weeks later to take out the 1966 VFL grand final by one point, winning their first and only premiership so far.

Collingwood were eliminated from the 1967 finals by eventual runner-up Geelong in the first semi-final. The Magpies trailed by one point at three-quarter time, but the Cats kicked six goals to one in the final quarter to win by 30 points. Tuddenham was reported for striking Geelong defender Geoff Ainsworth on the head with his forearm in the last quarter by field umpire Jeff Crouch. He was found guilty and suspended for four matches.

In February 1970, Tuddenham and his deputy Len Thompson were involved in a pay dispute after they learned that Collingwood had recruited its first interstate player, Peter Eakins, from Western Australian club Subiaco for a sign-on fee of A$5,000 and A$5,000 a season for three years. That was A$2,000 more than Tuddenham was receiving as captain. Tuddenham asked for A$8,000 over three seasons, and Thompson A$30,000 over five seasons, threatening to walk out if their demands were not met. Three weeks later, during which time there had been no negotiations, both players returned. Although their demands had not been met they did obtain a slightly improved salary; under the clubs terms, Tuddenham would receive A$125 per match plus VFL provident fund payments, and Thompson would earn A$105 per match.

Although Tuddenham was confident the little episode would not affect his chances of retaining the captaincy, the Magpies committee announced Terry Waters as captain for the 1970 VFL season and Tuddenham accepted the decision. Collingwood finished on top of the ladder with 18 wins and defeated arch-rivals Carlton in a semi-final by 10 points to advance to the grand final. However, as had happened four years earlier against St Kilda, Carlton would reverse the result in the 1970 VFL grand final, coming from 44 points down at half-time to overrun Collingwood in the second half. Tuddenham was regarded among Collingwood's best players on the day. During the game he accidentally floored teammate Peter McKenna in the second quarter with a hip-and-shoulder bump meant for a Carlton player. McKenna had kicked five goals up to that stage of the game and would only add one more for the rest of the match.

In an interview 40 years later, Tuddenham cited a lack of fitness, as well as inaccurate kicking for goal, as the main reason Collingwood lost:

"I suggested to (coach) Bob Rose after we lost the 1966 Grand Final to St Kilda by a point that he do the coaching and I look after the fitness along with my friend John Toleman. The idea was that I would be an assistant coach, and I'll tell you what, I would have got the buggers fit."

In 1971, Tuddenham became the first player to be named captain of the VFL representative team whilst not captain of his own club. When asked about this, state coach Tom Hafey replied bluntly: "We are not here to talk about Collingwood's mistakes."

Tuddenham stayed with the club for a further season before moving to Essendon as captain-coach. He played four seasons for the Bombers before returning to Collingwood for his final two seasons.

In 1978, Tuddenham was appointed senior coach of South Melbourne for a season, replaced by Ian Stewart when he failed to take the club to the finals. He coached VFA second division club Werribee to the finals in 1988, but left after he and the club concluded a playing coach would be better suited to the club's needs.

== Post-football career ==
Tuddenham ran a plastics manufacturing business, which he sold in 1979. He later worked as a scrap-metal dealer. Tuddenham recently appeared on Sam Newman’s You Cannot Be Serious podcast. https://podcasts.apple.com/au/podcast/episode-295-part-3-des-tuddenham/id1474582435?i=1000691253460

== Controversy ==
Since retirement, Tuddenham has been in trouble with the law on several occasions.

- In December 1980, he was found guilty by a County Court jury of having received stolen tyres valued at $30,000 and was remanded in custody.
- In June 1989, he pleaded guilty to a charge of conspiring to defraud the Victorian Automobile Chamber of Commerce of $13,000. He told the magistrate that he was "guilty on the grounds I was helping out a friend in trouble".
- In July 2004, it was reported that he had received a two-month sentence suspended for two years for his third drink-driving offence. He was ordered to pay a A$500 fine and had his driving licence cancelled for 30 months.
- In December 2017, he pleaded guilty and was convicted of drink driving, having been found to have a blood alcohol level of 0.055 after drinking "three beers" at a football function.

== Personal life ==
Tuddenham has four children. One of them, Paul, played 40 games for Collingwood from 1987 to 1991.

== Legacy ==
Tuddenham was inducted into the Australian Football Hall of Fame in 2008.

In 2009, The Australian nominated Tuddenham as one of the 25 greatest footballers never to win a Brownlow Medal.
