= Peter Boyne =

Australian rules footballer

Personal information
- Born: 28 May 1944 (age 82)
- Original team: North Heidelberg
- Height: 185 cm (6 ft 1 in)
- Weight: 80.5 kg (177 lb)

Playing career^{1}
Years	Club	Games (Goals)
1964–1968	Collingwood	60 (0)
- ^{1} Playing statistics correct to the end of 1968.

Career highlights
- Full Back in Collingwood's 1966 losing Grand Final side.

Peter Boyne (born 28 May 1944) is a former Australian rules footballer who played for the Collingwood in the VFL.

Boyne was an extremely reliable defender recruited from North Heidelberg. He played at full-back in Collingwood's losing 1966 Grand Final side in which he had 5 goals kicked on him by Kevin Neale.

Aged 24, his career was cut short when he injured his knee during the 1968 Season. He failed to play again. Boyne failed to kick a single goal and ended with one solitary behind in his 60-game career.
