= Doug Searl =

Australian rules footballer (1947–2026)

Personal information
- Full name: Douglas Roderick James Searl
- Born: 22 March 1947
- Died: 10 May 2026 (aged 79); Doreen, Victoria, Australia
- Original team: East Melbourne YCW
- Height: 192 cm (6 ft 4 in)
- Weight: 83 kg (183 lb)
- Positions: Centre half-forward, centre half-back

Playing career
Years	Club	Games (Goals)
1966–1968	Collingwood	12 (20)
1968–1976	Fitzroy	131 (170)
Total		143 (190)

Coaching career
Years	Club	Games (W–L–D)
1991–1992	Port Melbourne (VFA)	

Douglas Roderick James Searl (22 March 1947 – 10 May 2026) was an Australian rules footballer who played with Fitzroy and Collingwood in the Victorian Football League (VFL).

Searl started his career with Collingwood in 1966 and played mostly as a centre half-forward. He spent two and a bit seasons at Collingwood, including playing in the 1966 VFL Grand Final, which Collingwood lost to St Kilda by one point. During the 1968 VFL season Searl crossed to Fitzroy and had an immediate impact as a forward, kicking 31 goals in his eight games that year. In 1969, Searl topped Fitzroy's goalkicking with 68 goals which was the fourth most in the VFL that season and the best tally by a Fitzroy player in over three decades. He spent the rest of his career as a centre half back, playing his last game in 1976.

He continued to be involved in football as a coach and steered the Fitzroy under-19 team to the 1982 premiership. Searl then went on to coach Richmond under 19s for six seasons claiming two premierships in 1985 and 1989.

In 1991 and 1992 Searl coached Port Melbourne Football Club in the Victorian Football Association (VFA).

Searl's father Sid Searl played for Richmond and Port Melbourne in the 1940s, kicking 12 goals on debut, against Sandringham Football Club before being dropped the next week.

Doug Searl died on 10 May 2026, at the age of 79.

== Sources ==
- Atkinson, G. (1982) Everything you ever wanted to know about Australian rules football but couldn't be bothered asking, The Five Mile Press: Melbourne. ISBN 0 86788 009 0.
