= Kevin Egan =

Kevin Egan may refer to:

- Kevin Egan (footballer)
- Kevin Egan (politician)
- Kevin Patrick Egan, Irish sports broadcaster
