= Ted Potter =

Australian rules footballer

Personal information
- Born: 11 November 1944 (age 81)
- Original teams: Rutherglen, Greensborough (DVFL)
- Debut: Round 5, 1963, Collingwood vs. Melbourne
- Height: 187 cm (6 ft 2 in)
- Weight: 79 kg (174 lb)

Playing career^{1}
Years	Club	Games (Goals)
1963–1972	Collingwood	182 (0)
- ^{1} Playing statistics correct to the end of 1972.

Career highlights
- Victorian representative: 4 games

Ted Potter (born 11 November 1944) is a former Australian rules footballer. A key defender, he was a regular in the Collingwood Magpies side throughout the 1960s.

He is remembered for being the player whose supposedly wayward handball was intercepted by Barry Breen that resulted in the winning point for St Kilda in the 1966 VFL Grand Final; however, this is a misnomer, as the ball spilled free and was never actually handballed.

He retired in 1972 with 182 games to his name, the most ever by a player without scoring a goal.
