= Moorabbin Oval =

Australian rules football venue in Moorabbin, Victoria

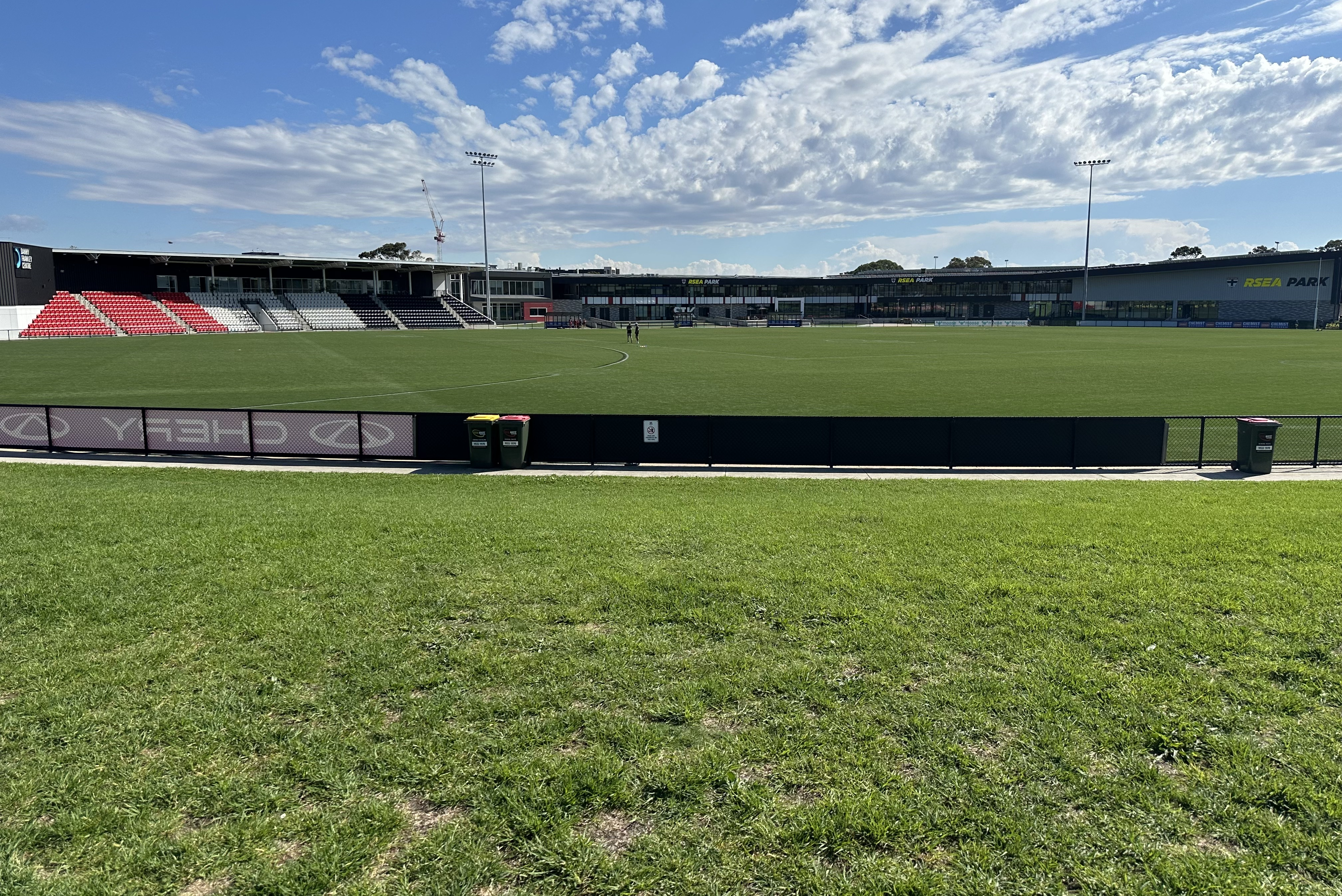
- Moorabbin Oval in April 2026
- Interactive map of Moorabbin Oval
- Address: 32–60 Linton Street; Moorabbin, Victoria
- Coordinates: 37.9375°S 145.0439°E
- Capacity: 8,000

Construction
- Opened: 1952; 74 years ago

Tenants
- St Kilda Football Club; Administration & Training (1965–2010; 2018–present); VFL/AFL (1965–1992); VFL/AFL reserves (1965–1999); VFL (2026–present); AFLW (2020–present) Other teams Sandringham Dragons (Talent League) (2018–present); Southern Saints (VFLW) (2018–2024); Melbourne Reds (ABL) (1994–1999)

Moorabbin Oval (known under naming rights as RSEA Park and historically referred to as Linton Street Oval) is an Australian rules football venue located in the Melbourne suburb of Moorabbin. It has been the home base of the St Kilda Football Club in the Australian Football League (AFL) near-continuously since 1965.

St Kilda played VFL/AFL matches at Moorabbin Oval from the 1965 season until 1992, retaining it as its primary training and administrative base until 2010. After moving its training and administrative headquarters to a facility in Seaford, the club returned to a redeveloped Moorabbin Oval in 2018, and since then the ground has hosted AFL pre-season, AFL Women's (AFLW), Victorian Football League (VFL) and VFL Women's (VFLW) matches.

In addition to St Kilda, the venue is the home of the Sandringham Dragons in the Talent League and serves as the administrative base of the Southern Football Netball League (SFNL) and the South Metro Junior Football League (SMJFL).

== History ==
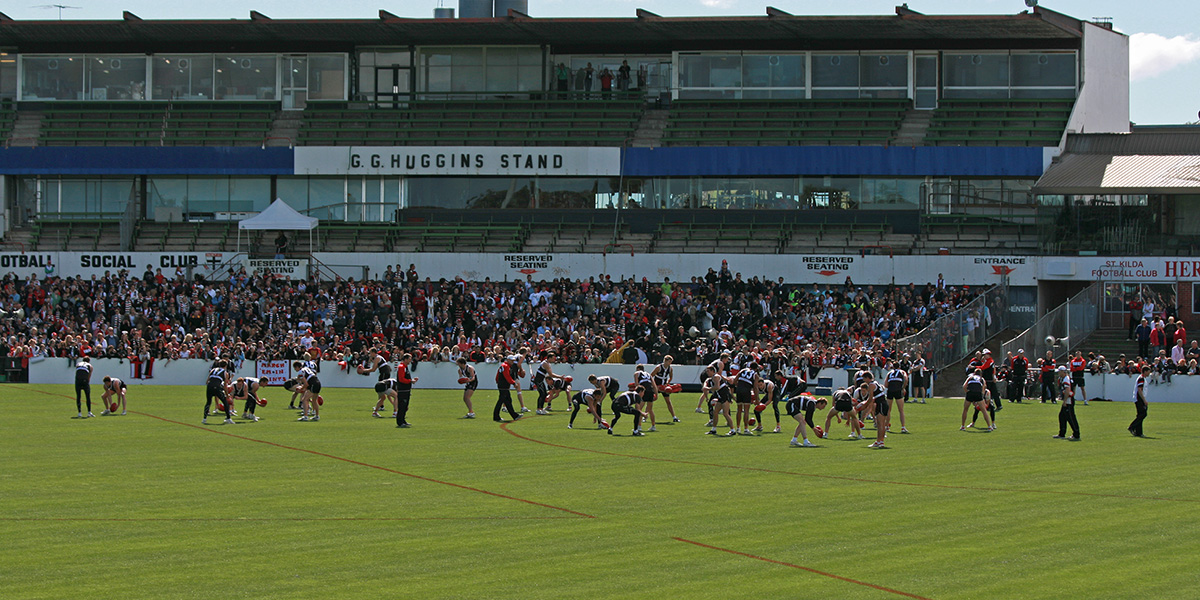
St Kilda players training in front of the Huggins Stand with an estimated crowd of 10,000 prior to the 2009 AFL Grand Final

In 1951, the growing City of Moorabbin committed to developing a fenced football venue that was up to Victorian Football Association (VFA) standards to be used by the Moorabbin Football Club. The strong club had been admitted from the Federal District League to the VFA in 1951, and its continued admission was contingent on the council developing Moorabbin Oval for its use. The venue became one of the highest quality venues in the Association and was noted for having the largest playing surface in the Association, similar in size to the Melbourne Cricket Ground.

Starting from 1960, Moorabbin Council worked actively to bring VFL football to the venue. After it was found that the VFL was unlikely to admit Moorabbin Football Club as a new team, the council began negotiating for existing VFL clubs, many of which were dissatisfied with their home grounds at the time, to move to Moorabbin. In 1963, both Richmond and Fitzroy were approached, and then in early 1964, the council came to an agreement with the St Kilda Football Club. St Kilda relocated its training, playing and administrative base from the St Kilda Cricket Club Ground to Moorabbin Oval at the end of the 1964 season.

The council invested a further £100,000 to bring the venue to VFL standards and expand its capacity to 50,000. The St Kilda Football Club signed a 75-year - £5,000 per year (initially) deal for the ground with an up front lump sum payment, under which it became ground manager, and committed to invest £120,000 in establishing a licensed social club and to invest £375,000 for ground improvements over the first 45 years of the deal (a period which expired at approximately the end of 2009). The Moorabbin Football Club, then the defending VFA premiers, supported the move and attempted an amalgamation with St Kilda, actions which resulted in its suspension from the VFA. A new grandstand was finished before the 1965 VFL season. St Kilda FC also agreed to lease parkland belonging to the local council on the outer side of the ground outside the clubs property, so that if further spectator seating or carpark developments occurred there would be more room for the constructions.

The St Kilda Football Club completed its financial obligation to make ground improvements prior to the end of 2009, including redeveloping the G.G. Huggins Stand into the main training and administration base for the club when home games at Moorabbin ceased in 1992. The 75-year deal precludes Moorabbin Oval from being sold until approximately 2039.

== St Kilda Football Club ==
The St Kilda Football Club left their original home ground, the Junction Oval after the 1964 season and moved to Moorabbin Oval, motivated by the desire to operate its own venue. In March 1964, the club arranged a deal to move its playing, training and administrative base to Moorabbin Oval with all home games at the new venue starting the 1965 season.

The club signed a preliminary purchase agreement in August 1964, locking the club into Moorabbin Oval facilities for 75 years with no bail-out clause, provided it completed required works at the ground to establish a social club, training facilities and spectator seating on the site in time for the 1965 Premiership season. The club had to invest a set amount, combined with funds from the local council, and complete the required works by a deadline date to ensure the agreement was ratified and the purchase was complete. The remaining purchase cost of Moorabbin Oval was scheduled to be repaid over the subsequent agreement period of 75 years, which ends in 2039.

St Kilda Football Club's move to Moorabbin Oval was highly successful. In its first season at the new ground the club played in front of capacity crowds. The Saints' first ever home game at Moorabbin attracted a record crowd of 51,370 against Collingwood in Round 1, 1965, a record that was never broken. When it was first used, Moorabbin Oval was the third largest ground by capacity in metropolitan Melbourne after the Melbourne Cricket Ground and Princes Park; it was relegated to fourth place following the opening of VFL Park in 1970. St Kilda FC won its first minor premiership in 1965 and played in the grand final.

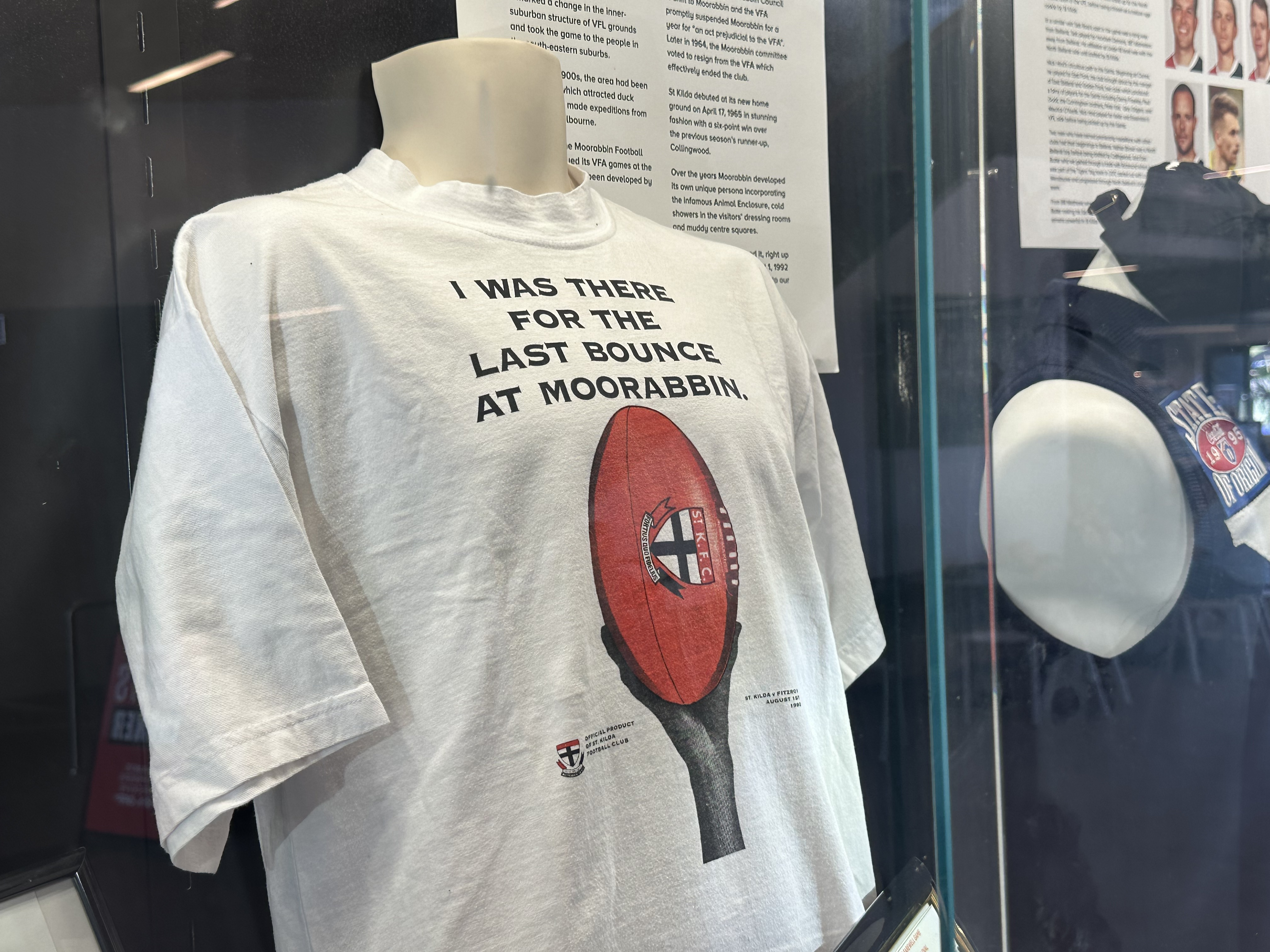
Shirt reading "I was there for the last bounce at Moorabbin" on display at the CJ Levin Heritage Museum

St Kilda ceased playing home games at Moorabbin Oval after 1992 and began playing home fixtures at Waverley Park, as part of the AFL's grounds rationalisation strategy of the early 1990s. The club received $430,000 upfront and $120,000 per year for three years from the AFL as part of the change, which helped to clear some of the club's debt. St Kilda's final home game for premiership points at Moorabbin Oval was the Round 20 match on 1 August 1992, an 18-point win over the Fitzroy Lions in front of 27,736.

St Kilda played 254 matches for premiership points at Moorabbin Oval between 1965 and 1992, with an average attendance of 21,232. In the late 1970s and early to mid-1980s, when St Kilda suffered from severe financial hardship and had generally weak results, the ground was often quite muddy due to ground management issues including security. Other organisations who did not own their home base or stadium took exception at St Kilda FC's "groundbreaking" deal to buy Moorabbin Oval in the 1960s with the 75-year payment deal and attempts to force St Kilda out of Moorabbin Oval by those who claimed to take offence at the club ownership of it were common – particularly after St Kilda won its first Premiership in 1966.

St Kilda Football Club Match Record at Moorabbin Oval
Venue	Played	Won	Lost	Drawn	Most Recent Match
Moorabbin Oval	254 ~	134 (52.76%)	118 (46.46%)	2 (0.78%)	1992 AFL Premiership Season Round 20
1965 to 1992

After home games ceased being played at Moorabbin Oval, the club maintained its training and administrative base at the ground. The ground was extensively renovated to provide training, administration and entertainment facilities within the Huggins Stand and a heritage museum in the Drake Stand. The G.G. Huggins Stand had three internal floors that contained player rooms, a fully equipped player gymnasium, football department meeting rooms, administration offices, a membership department, gaming room and bar, the Trevor Barker Room (a function room with a bar), club shop, trophy and memorabilia display areas and other facilities.

=== St Kilda leave Moorabbin Oval ===
In 2007, the relationship between the club and the ground's owner the City of Kingston deteriorated, and St Kilda announced that it would move its primary administrative and training base away from Moorabbin. A new facility was built at Belvedere Park in Seaford, approximately 21 kilometres south of Moorabbin; the development occurred in conjunction with the City of Frankston, state government and the AFL. St Kilda moved to the Seaford base after the 2010 season. The club still managed Moorabbin Oval and used it as a retail, museum and entertainment space.

== Redevelopment and St Kilda's return to Moorabbin ==
St Kilda's move to Seaford was short-lived, with the club's players criticising the additional travel time to the ground compared to Moorabbin, and the club outgrowing the site with the addition of women's teams and larger football facilities. By late 2015 funding was secured for a major redevelopment of Moorabbin Oval and the Saints return to Moorabbin was confirmed by the club and state government. The redevelopment was partially completed in time for St Kilda's return to the ground in March 2018.

Approximately $30 million was invested toward the redevelopment of the ground, with the finances being raised from the state government, club, AFL, Kingston Council and local football leagues. As part of the redevelopment the ground was named RSEA Park, due to a sponsorship arrangement with the safety work-wear company. The full first stage of the redevelopment, which included the demolition of the Drake Stand and Huggins Stand, was completed in November 2018.

The venue also serves as the home ground for the Sandringham Dragons and marquee Southern Football League matches, as well as other local community clubs and leagues.

=== Stage 2 ===
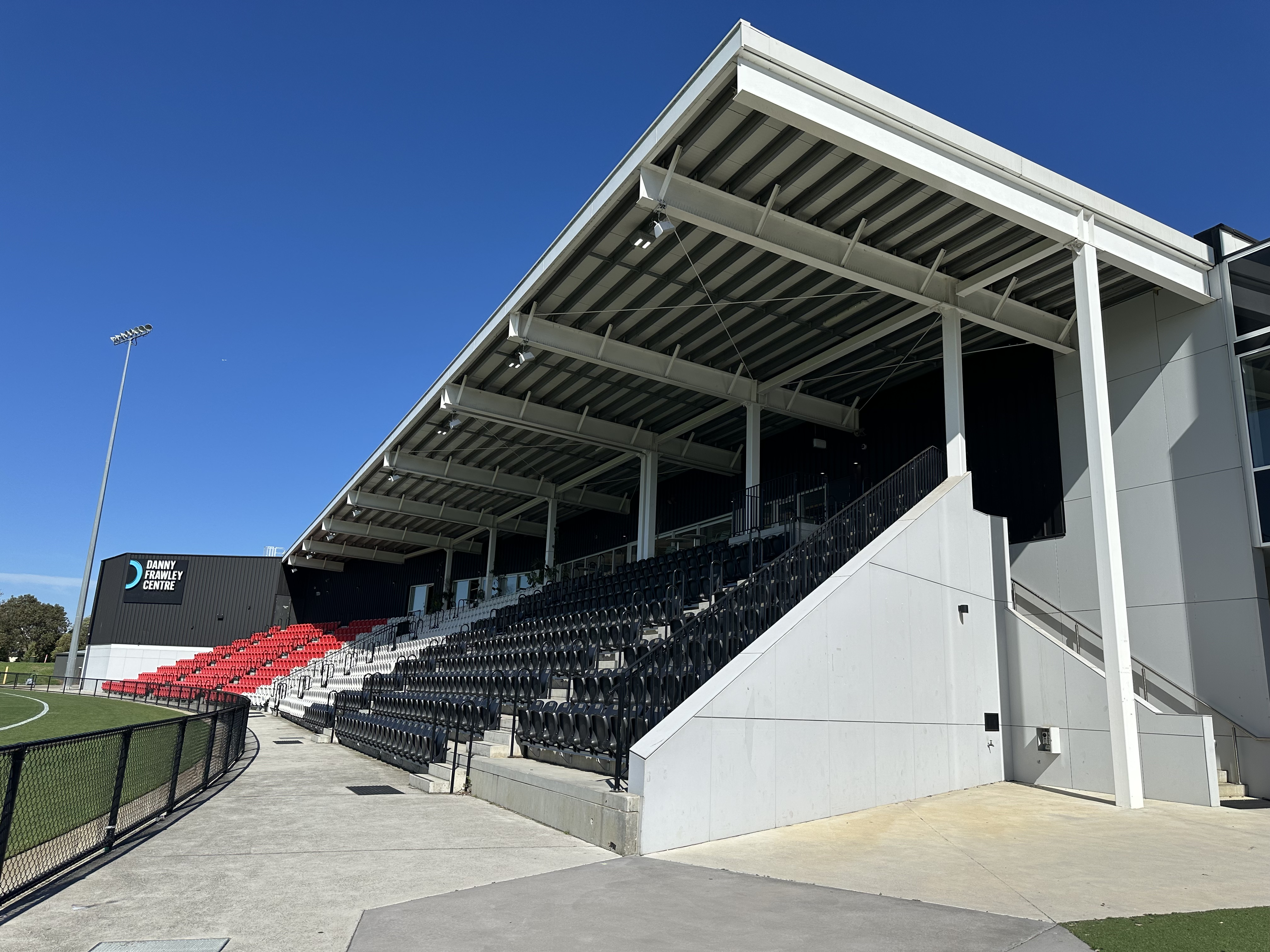
The Danny Frawley Centre was a vital component of the ground's redevelopment

Moorabbin Oval commenced a second stage of development after a state government grant of $13 million was publicly announced on 13 April 2018. Stage 2 included the construction of the Community Health & Wellbeing Centre, later named the Danny Frawley Centre, as well as a four-lane lap pool, a hydrotherapy pool, male and female changing rooms, an additional gym, integrated classroom/suite spaces and a 1000-seat grandstand. Work on Stage 2 commenced in August 2019. The facility is a multi-purpose space capable of delivering wellbeing programs to schools and community groups of up to 250 participants and includes dedicated mental health facilities and consultation rooms. It also houses a 25 metre lap pool, hydrotherapy pool, a community gym, recovery centre and yoga studio. The centre was opened on 1 March 2022 with several prominent individuals in attendance including AFL CEO Gillion McLachlan, Nick Riewoldt, Stewart Loewe, Gary Lyon, Jason Dunstall and film star Eric Bana.

In August 2021, the Saints announced a multi-million dollar upgrade of the ground’s turf, drainage and irrigation system and footpaths. Funding was contributed by the Federal Government, Victorian Government, Kingston City Council and the AFL. The turf upgrade was completed by mid-February 2022.

== VFL/AFL records ==
- Highest attendance: 51,370 - St Kilda Football Club vs Collingwood - 1965
- Highest winning margin: 140 points - Carlton Blues vs St Kilda - 1985
- Most goals: 323 - Tony Lockett St Kilda Football Club - 1983 to 1992
- Most goals in a game: 15 - Tony Lockett St Kilda Football Club vs Sydney Swans Football Club - 1992
- Most games at Moorabbin: 128 - Barry Breen - 1965 to 1982
- Highest Score: 26.20 (176) - Sydney Swans vs St Kilda - 1985
- Lowest Score: Geelong 3.3 (21) vs St Kilda - 1971

=== St Kilda club records ===
- Highest attendance: 51,370 - St Kilda FC vs Collingwood - Round 1, 1965
- Highest winning margin: 131 points - St Kilda FC vs Adelaide Football Club - Round 7, 1991
- Most goals: 323 - Tony Lockett - St Kilda FC - 1983 to 1992
- Most goals in a game: 15 - Tony Lockett - St Kilda FC vs Sydney Swans Football Club - Round 13, 1992
- Most games at Moorabbin: 128 - Barry Breen - St Kilda FC - 1965 to 1982
- Highest Score: 27.12 (174) - St Kilda FC vs Brisbane Bears Football Club - Round 23, 1991
- Most disposals in a game: Paul Callery - St Kilda FC vs Sydney Swans Football Club - Round 19, 1974
- Most consecutive wins: 19 - St Kilda FC - Round 1, 2009 vs Sydney Swans Football Club to Round 19, 2009 vs Hawthorn Football Club

== Other uses and in popular culture ==
Moorabbin Oval was the home of the Melbourne Reds in the former Australian Baseball League from 1994 to 1999. An abandoned oval was the site of a police-targeting sniper in Season 1 Episode 3 of the Melbourne-based police drama Rush. Australian folk rock rock band Weddings Parties Anything also references the venue in their song "A Decent Cup of Coffee".
