= Bruce McMaster-Smith =

Australian rules footballer

- McMaster-Smith in 1964

Personal information
- Full name: Bruce McMaster-Smith
- Born: 19 November 1939
- Died: 6 June 2017 (aged 77)
- Original team: Greensborough (DVFL)
- Height: 169 cm (5 ft 7 in)
- Weight: 61 kg (134 lb)

Playing career^{1}
Years	Club	Games (Goals)
1960–61	Fitzroy	13 (1)
1962–64	Carlton	26 (6)
1965	St Kilda	15 (7)
Total		54 (14)
- ^{1} Playing statistics correct to the end of 1965.

Bruce McMaster-Smith (19 November 1939 – 6 June 2017) was an Australian rules footballer who played with Fitzroy, Carlton and St Kilda in the Victorian Football League (VFL) during the early 1960s.

Originally from Diamond Valley Football League club Greensborough, McMaster-Smith played as a rover and wingman. He started out at Fitzroy but played his best football with Carlton and was their equal top vote getter in the 1962 Brownlow Medal.

McMaster-Smith, now at St Kilda, kicked a last-second goal to give his new club a win over his old team Carlton and was on the wing when the Saints lost the 1965 VFL Grand Final to Essendon later in the year. He had almost made a Grand Final with Fitzroy in 1960 but they lost the Preliminary Final to Collingwood by five points and he was also at Carlton when they reached the 1962 Grand Final but he missed the entire finals series. After the 1965 premiership decider, he was forced to retire due to chronic hamstring problems.

He played football as an amateur so he could compete in amateur athletics competitions.
