= Bruce Waite =

Australian rules footballer

Personal information
- Born: 22 May 1946 (age 80)
- Original team: Albury
- Height: 192 cm (6 ft 4 in)
- Weight: 92 kg (203 lb)

Playing career^{1}
Years	Club	Games (Goals)
1965–1969	Essendon	48 (29)
- ^{1} Playing statistics correct to the end of 1969.

Bruce Waite (born 22 May 1946) is a former Australian rules footballer who played with Essendon in the Victorian Football League (VFL) during the late 1960s.

A ruckman from Albury, Waite often played in a forward pocket for Essendon. He came off the bench as a reserve in Essendon's 1965 VFL Grand Final win over St Kilda to end his debut season in a premiership team.

Waite won the Ovens and Murray Football League best and Fairest award, the Morris Medal in 1972, playing for the Myrtleford Football Club.
