= Will Sierakowski =

Australian rules footballer (born 1990)

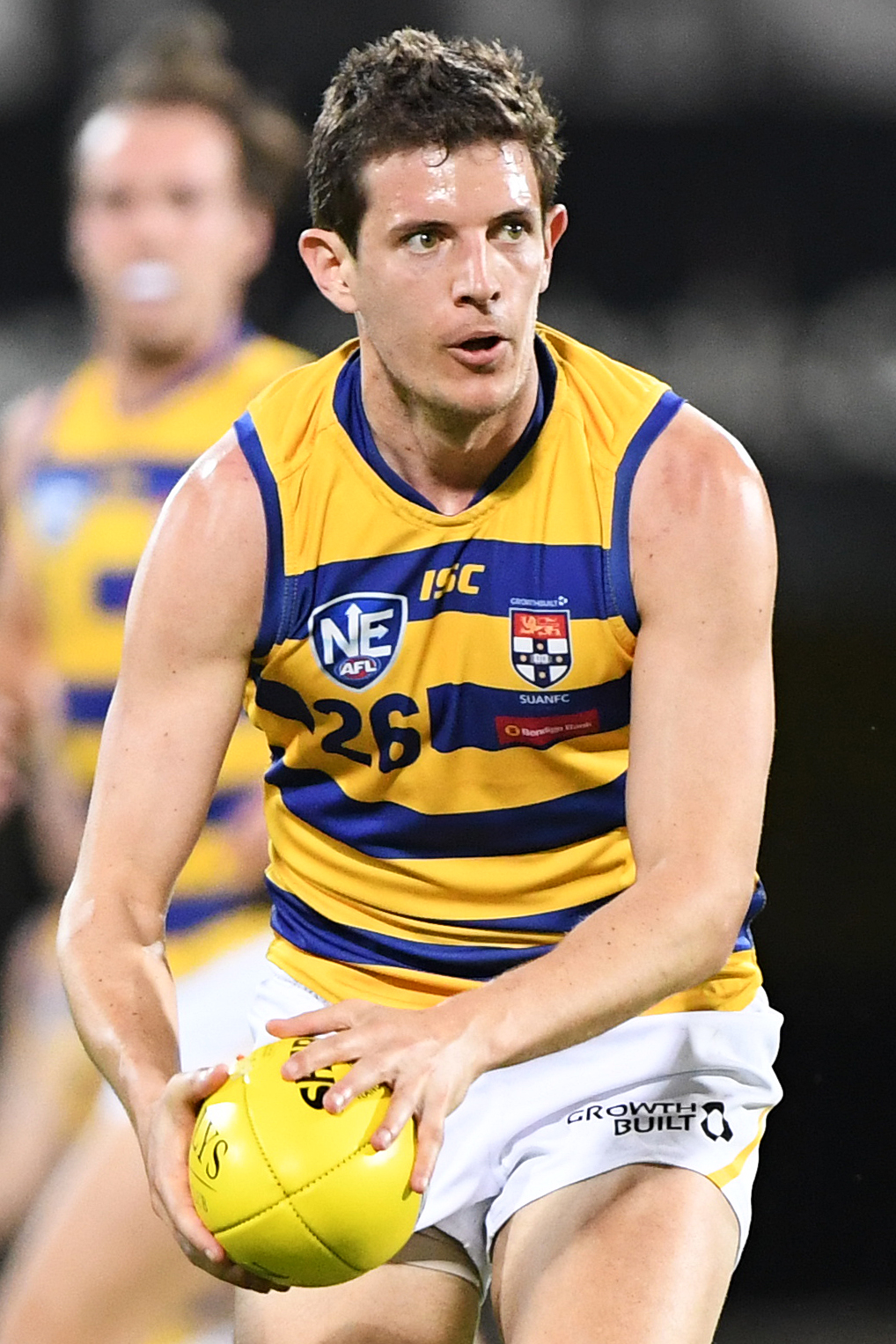
- Sierakowski in August 2019

Personal information
- Full name: Will Sierakowski
- Born: 26 July 1990 (age 36)
- Original team: North Shore Bombers
- Draft: No. 85, 2009 Rookie Draft, Hawthorn
- Height: 187 cm (6 ft 2 in)
- Weight: 83 kg (183 lb)

Playing career^{1}
Years	Club	Games (Goals)
2009–2011	Hawthorn	0 (0)
2012–2013	North Melbourne	7 (1)
- ^{1} Playing statistics correct to the end of 2013.

Will Sierakowski (born 26 July 1990) is an Australian rules footballer who played for the North Melbourne Football Club in the Australian Football League (AFL). He was traded, in exchange for draft pick No. 58, from the Hawthorn Football Club in the 2011 Trade Week after being on the rookie list for three years, but not making his AFL debut. He is the nephew of former St Kilda premiership player Brian Sierakowski and the cousin of former West Coast and St Kilda's David Sierakowski.

In Round 6 of the 2013 AFL season Sierakowski made his AFL debut for North Melbourne against Port Adelaide. He was delisted at the end of 2013 after playing seven games that season.

After leaving North Melbourne, Sierakowski returned to his home state of New South Wales and played for the Sydney University Football Club in the NEAFL.
