= Ian Montgomery =

Australian rules footballer

Personal information
- Full name: Ian Montgomery
- Born: 3 May 1944 (age 82)
- Original teams: Greta, Wangaratta
- Height: 183 cm (6 ft 0 in)
- Weight: 81 kg (179 lb)
- Position: Defender

Playing career^{1}
Years	Club	Games (Goals)
1965–1968	Collingwood	48 (0)
- ^{1} Playing statistics correct to the end of 1968.

Ian Montgomery (born 3 May 1944) is a former Australian rules footballer who played with Collingwood in the Victorian Football League (VFL) during the 1960s.

Montgomery, in 1965, broke into the Collingwood side for the first time in round six and played every game for the rest of the year, including two finals. He made 17 appearances the following season and played from the back pocket in the 1966 VFL Grand Final, which Collingwood lost by a point.

After two more seasons at Collingwood, Montgomery embarked on a coaching career and was the first ever coach of Rythdale-Officer-Cardinia. He also spent some time as an assistant coach at Dandenong in the Victorian Football Association.
