= Sid Searl =

Australian rules footballer, born 1917

Personal information
- Full name: Sidney Humphrey Douglas Searl
- Born: 10 January 1917; Kew, Victoria
- Died: 11 January 2000 (aged 83)
- Original team: Kew Districts
- Height: 178 cm (5 ft 10 in)
- Weight: 64 kg (141 lb)

Playing career^{1}
Years	Club	Games (Goals)
1941	Port Melbourne (VFA)	7 (20)
1942	Richmond	3 (0)
1945–48	Port Melbourne (VFA)	62 (3)
1949–50	Northcote (VFA)	34 (5)
- ^{1} Playing statistics correct to the end of 1950.

Sidney Humphrey Douglas Searl (10 January 1917 – 11 January 2000) was an Australian rules footballer who played with Richmond in the Victorian Football League (VFL).
