= Kevin Egan (footballer) =

Australian rules footballer (born 1943)

Personal information
- Born: 10 September 1943 (age 83)
- Original team: Moonee Ponds
- Height: 173 cm (5 ft 8 in)
- Weight: 73 kg (161 lb)

Playing career^{1}
Years	Club	Games (Goals)
1963–1969	Essendon	65 (13)
1970	Port Adelaide	15 (1)
Total		80 (14)
- ^{1} Playing statistics correct to the end of 1969.

Kevin Egan (born 10 September 1943) is a former Australian rules footballer who played with Essendon in the Victorian Football League during the 1960s.

Egan was a skilled youth player at Essendon and won a Morrish Medal in 1962 for his performances in the Under-19s. The following season he made his first senior appearance and played in Essendon's 1965 premiership team. Egan was used mostly as a rover and wingman.

After leaving Essendon Egan spent some time at both South Australian National Football League (SANFL) club Port Adelaide and the Victorian Football Association's (VFA) Williamstown Football Club. At the VFA Seagulls, Egan played 19 games and kicked 16 goals in 1971 and 1972. He was a member of the Tasmanian club's Scottsdale combination of 1973 which was inducted into the Tasmanian Football Hall of Fame.

In 1977 Egan returned to Essendon as the club's Football Manager, a position he held until 1991. He later became the Chairman of Selectors at Essendon.
