= Max Pitt =

Australian rules footballer

Personal information
- Born: 4 June 1946 (age 80)
- Original team: Mildura Imperials
- Debut: 1966, Collingwood vs. Hawthorn, at Glenferrie Oval

Playing career^{1}
Years	Club	Games (Goals)
1966–1968	Collingwood	27 (7)
1968–1969	St Kilda	7 (1)
Total		34 (8)
- ^{1} Playing statistics correct to the end of 1969.

Max Pitt (born 4 January 1946) is a former Australian rules footballer who played with Collingwood and St Kilda in the Victorian Football League from 1966 until 1969, playing 34 games and kicking 8 goals.
