= Alan Morrow =

Australian rules footballer (1936–2023)

Personal information
- Full name: Alan Garner Morrow
- Born: 29 November 1936
- Died: 13 July 2023 (aged 86)
- Original team: Sale
- Height: 183 cm (6 ft 0 in)
- Weight: 89 kg (196 lb)

Playing career^{1}
Years	Club	Games (Goals)
1957–1966	St Kilda	163 (151)
- ^{1} Playing statistics correct to the end of 1966.

Career highlights
- St Kilda Premiership player 1966; St Kilda Team of the Century member; Dandenong premiership captain-coach 1967

Alan Garner Morrow (29 November 1936 – 13 July 2023) was an Australian rules footballer in the VFL.

A hard working tough ruckman who took on a ruck role when Carl Ditterich missed the 1966 Grand Final due to suspension. St Kilda controversially recruited Morrow and Bill Stephenson from Sale, illegally offering money.

Morrow was injured early in the 1965 Grand Final, the favoured Saints losing the match in part due to missing Morrow. The Grand Final win in 1966 was his last VFL game.

Morrow moved to Dandenong in the Victorian Football Association in 1967 as captain-coach, and led Dandenong to its first Division 1 premiership that season.

Morrow died on 13 July 2023, at the age of 86.

== See also ==
- 1967 VFA Grand Final
