= Allan Davis (footballer) =

Australian rules footballer

Personal information
- Born: 29 September 1948 (age 78)
- Original team: East Sandringham
- Height: 180 cm (5 ft 11 in)
- Weight: 77 kg (170 lb)

Playing career^{1}
Years	Club	Games (Goals)
1966–1975	St Kilda	173 (308)
1976–1977	Melbourne	41 (36)
1978–1979	Essendon	33 (27)
1980	Collingwood	3 (1)
Total		250 (372)

Coaching career
Years	Club	Games (W–L–D)
1987	St Kilda	4 (2–2–0)
- ^{1} Playing statistics correct to the end of 1980.

Career highlights
- St Kilda premiership - 1966; St Kilda leading goalkicker - 1971 & 1973

Allan Davis (born 29 September 1948) is a former Australian rules footballer who played for the St Kilda Football Club in the Victorian Football League (VFL). He played as a forward and topped the club's goalkicking charts in 1971 and 1973.

Davis was the youngest member of the Saints' 1966 grand final win. On leaving the Saints in 1976 (after 173 VFL games for 303 goals) he had stints with Melbourne (41 games for 36 goals), Essendon (33 games for 27 goals) and Collingwood (3 games for 1 goal).

He later played in Tasmania with Latrobe in the North Western Football Union, and served as caretaker coach of the Saints for the last four games of 1987 after Darrel Baldock suffered a minor stroke.

Davis is the grandfather of AFL draft prospect Arki Butler
