= Kevin Billing =

Australian rules footballer

Personal information
- Born: 26 October 1944 (age 82); Melbourne
- Height: 179 cm (5 ft 10 in)
- Weight: 75 kg (165 lb)

Playing career^{1}
| Years | Club | Games (Goals) |
| 1962–1969 | St Kilda | 27 (1) |
- ^{1} Playing statistics correct to the end of 1969.

Career highlights
- VFL premiership player: 1966

Kevin Billing (born 26 October 1944) is a former Australian rules footballer who played for St Kilda in the Victorian Football League (VFL). He was a member of the 1966 St Kilda Premiership team.
