= Ian Cooper (Australian footballer, born 1946) =

Australian rules footballer (1946–2021)

Ian Charles Cooper

Personal information
- Born: 2 April 1946
- Died: 14 December 2021 (aged 75)
- Original team: East Sandringham
- Height: 188 cm (6 ft 2 in)
- Weight: 76 kg (168 lb)

Playing career^{1}
Years	Club	Games (Goals)
1964–1969	St Kilda	69 (31)
- ^{1} Playing statistics correct to the end of 1969.

Ian Charles Cooper (2 April 1946 – 14 December 2021) was a former Australian rules footballer who played for St Kilda in the Victorian Football League during the 1960s.

== Career ==
Ian Cooper kicked the first ever goal at Moorabbin in 1965, not far from a spot where his family had once camped. In a retrospective poll by a team of experts, Cooper was voted best on the field in the 1966 VFL Grand Final, which St Kilda won. It was St Kilda's first and (as of 2024) only VFL/AFL premiership by a margin of one point over Collingwood.

Cooper's VFL career was cut short by rheumatic fever. In 1970 and 1971, Cooper played for Swan Districts in the West Australian National Football League, and was a Western Australian state representative player. In 1972, he returned to Victoria and became a prominent full forward with the Sandringham Football Club in the Victorian Football Association, where he played 35 games and kicked 73 goals. In 1973, he kicked 104 goals to be the VFA Division 1 leading goalkicker for the home-and-away season, although he was passed in the finals by Jim 'Frosty' Miller. Altogether, Cooper played 56 games for Sandringham between 1972 and 1975, and kicked 282 goals.

His older brother Graham played for Hawthorn in the early 1960s, appearing in that club's first premiership team.

== Death ==
Ian fought valiantly against cancer for a long time before he died on 14 December 2021. He was 75 years old.
