= Jeff Moran =

Australian rules footballer

Personal information
- Born: 7 January 1947 (age 79)
- Original team: East Brighton
- Height: 179 cm (5 ft 10 in)
- Weight: 76 kg (168 lb)

Playing career^{1}
Years	Club	Games (Goals)
1965–1974	St Kilda	155 (63)
1975, 1982	Dandenong Football Club	10 (12)
Total		165 (75)
- ^{1} Playing statistics correct to the end of 1974.

Jeff Moran (born 7 January 1947) is a former Australian rules footballer who played for St Kilda in the Victorian Football League (VFL). He also played a season at VFA side Dandenong.
