= Jeff Crouch =

Australian rules football field umpire

Personal information
- Born: 7 August 1934
- Died: 5 August 1994 (aged 59)

Playing career
Years	Club	Games (Goals)	
- Sandringham

Umpiring career
Years	League	Role	Games
1961–70	VFL	Field umpire	186

Jeff Crouch (7 August 1934 – 5 August 1994) was a leading Australian rules football field umpire in the Victorian Football League (VFL) in the 1960s and 1970s.

Crouch played in the 1953 Melbourne under-19s grand final and for Sandringham in the Victorian Football Association before switching his focus to umpiring. He was known for his excellent rapport with players. He became the VFL umpires advisor after retiring. His umpiring career spanned from 1961 to 1970 and in total he umpired 186 games, including 15 finals matches. He umpired grand finals in 1963, 1965, 1966, 1968 and 1969.

He was named Victorian Father of the Year in 1989 and was a director of the Royal Children's Hospital Appeal for 20 years.

Crouch was inducted to the Australian Football Hall of Fame in 1996.

Crouch died on 5 August 1994 from cancer.
