= Bob Murray (Australian footballer) =

Australian rules footballer (born 1942)

Robert W. Murray

Personal information
- Born: 5 April 1942 (age 84)
- Original team: Sandringham (VFA)
- Height: 185 cm (6 ft 1 in)
- Weight: 76 kg (168 lb)

Playing career^{1}
Years	Club	Games (Goals)
1960-1962	Sandringham	26 (49)
1963–1974	St Kilda	153 (14)
1974-1976	Sandringham	38 (105)
Total		217 (168)
- ^{1} Playing statistics correct to the end of 1976.

Career highlights
- VFA Premiership player: 1962; VFL Premiership player: 1966; St Kilda Best and Fairest: 1969; All-Australian: 1969; Victorian state representative 8 times; Sandringham best & fairest: 1974; St Kilda - Hall of Fame Inductee: 2009

Robert W. "Bob" Murray (born 5 April 1942) is a former Australian rules footballer in the VFL.

Murray played with St Kilda initially as a forward, kicking four goals on debut, but soon moved to full-back. He starred in St Kilda's 1966 Grand Final win, taking a mark in defence with seconds left in the game. He won the Trevor Barker Award as St Kilda's best and fairest player in 1969.

Murray also played in the Victorian Football Association for the Sandringham Football Club. Prior to his time at St Kilda, he played 52 games for Sandringham, including (in the last game of that stint) Sandringham's 1962 premiership in which it came back from a 44-point three-quarter-time deficit to defeat Moorabbin by one point. After his time at St Kilda, he returned to play 2½ seasons with Sandringham from 1974 until 1976.

Murray won Sandringham's 1974 best and fairest award.

Murray coached Tarrawingee Football Club in the Ovens & King Football League from 1981 to 1983 and played a handful of games in 1981 and 1982, kicking 40 goals.

Murray later coached Wangaratta Rovers Football Club reserves team from 2004 to 2008, winning a premiership in 2007, after being runners up in 2005 and 2006.
