= Brian Mynott =

English-born Australian rules footballer

Personal information
- Full name: Brian Richard Mynott
- Born: 29 January 1944 (age 82); Southampton, England
- Original team: Noble Park-Harrisfield
- Height: 193 cm (6 ft 4 in)
- Weight: 92 kg (203 lb)

Playing career^{1}
Years	Club	Games (Goals)
1964–1975	St Kilda	210 (75)
- ^{1} Playing statistics correct to the end of 1975.

Brian Richard Mynott (born 29 January 1944) is a former Australian rules footballer. He was born in Southampton in England.

Mynott is a 1966 VFL premiership player for St Kilda.
