= Brian Sierakowski =

Australian rules footballer and lawyer

Personal information
- Full name: Brian Cosmas Sierakowski
- Born: 1 November 1945 (age 81)
- Original team: Mentone Football Club / Xavier College
- Height: 188 cm (6 ft 2 in)
- Weight: 87 kg (192 lb)
- Position: Ruck rover

Playing career^{1}
Years	Club	Games (Goals)
1964–1968	St Kilda	75 (2)
1969–1974	Subiaco	115 (20)
Total		190 (22)
- ^{1} Playing statistics correct to the end of 1974.

Career highlights
- St Kilda premiership side 1966; Subiaco Best & Fairest 1972; Subiaco premiership side 1973; Western Australia representative 1969 carnival 3 games & 1971; VFL Tribunal Member 1997; West Coast Eagles Director 1993-99; Subiaco Hall of Fame 2005 (Diehards); University Football Club Coach 1976-1978; University Football Club Premiership Coach 1977; Subiaco Life Member 1985; Subiaco Vice President 1982-83; Australian Sports Medal 2000; West Australian Football Commission Life Member 2012; AFL Life Member 2014

Brian Cosmas Sierakowski (born 1 November 1945) is a lawyer and former Australian rules footballer.

== Family ==
His son, David Sierakowski, also played for St Kilda and the West Coast Eagles in the AFL and his nephew, Will Sierakowski, played for Hawthorn & North Melbourne. His brother in law is Richmond team of the century member Michael Green. His grand-nephew is current GWS player Tom Green.

== Football ==
He played as a ruckman and defender for the St Kilda Football Club playing 75 games and kicking two goals from 1964 to 1968. He played in the 1966 premiership side and was named as one of the best players in the Grand Final. Later, he played for Subiaco and represented Western Australia.

He has contributed 40 years of honorary service to the Western Australian Football Commission is his role as arbitrator, appeals tribunal member and Chairman of Community football.

== Shark attack ==
He survived a shark attack in 1997 off Cottesloe. His damaged surf ski 'Extract of Poland' adorns the ceiling of the well-known Cicerello's Fish 'n' Chips in Fremantle.
