= Rodger Head =

Australian rules footballer

Personal information
- Full name: Rodger Head
- Born: 20 June 1939
- Died: 8 July 2012 (aged 73)
- Original team: Black Rock
- Height: 175 cm (5 ft 9 in)
- Weight: 76 kg (168 lb)

Playing career^{1}
| Years | Club | Games (Goals) |
| 1959–1967 | St Kilda | 93 (3) |
- ^{1} Playing statistics correct to the end of 1967.

Rodger Head (20 June 1939 – 8 July 2012) was an Australian rules footballer who played for St Kilda in the Victorian Football League during the 1960s. Head was a member of the St Kilda 1966 Premiership team. Lived in Anglesea, a legend of the Surf Coast.
