= Jim Read (footballer) =

Australian rules footballer (1943–2020)

Personal information
- Full name: James Leslie Read
- Born: 22 December 1943
- Died: 10 October 2020 (aged 76)
- Original team: East Brighton
- Height: 175 cm (5 ft 9 in)
- Weight: 75 kg (165 lb)

Playing career^{1}
Years	Club	Games (Goals)
1962–1967	St Kilda	76 (9)
- ^{1} Playing statistics correct to the end of 1967.

James Leslie Read (22 December 1943 – 10 October 2020) was an Australian rules footballer who played for St Kilda in the Victorian Football League (VFL).
