= Ian Synman =

Australian rules footballer

Personal information
- Full name: Ian Morris Synman
- Born: 28 September 1938 (age 88)
- Original team: Melbourne Grammar
- Height: 188 cm (6 ft 2 in)
- Weight: 85 kg (187 lb)
- Position: Centre half-back

Playing career^{1}
Years	Club	Games (Goals)
1958–59; 1961–69	St Kilda	154 (0)
- ^{1} Playing statistics correct to the end of 1969.

Career highlights
- 1966 St Kilda FC Premiership Player; St Kilda FC Hall of Fame Inductee

Ian Morris Synman (born 28 September 1938) is a former Australian rules footballer who played in the Victorian Football League (VFL).

He played as a centre half-back for the St Kilda Football Club, playing 153 games (0 goals) from 1958 to 1969. A Melbourne Grammar recruit, he played 123 consecutive games and wore the number 9.

Synman played in the 1966 premiership side. He is Jewish and, although the Grand Final fell on Yom Kippur, Synman received special dispensation to play. He is one of the few Jewish players to have played Australian rules football at the highest level.

== See also ==
- List of select Jewish Australian Rules footballers
