= Kevin Neale =

Australian rules footballer (1945–2023)

- Neale in 1965

Personal information
- Full name: Kevin Charles Neale
- Nickname: Cowboy
- Born: 18 July 1945
- Died: 16 September 2023 (aged 78)
- Original team: South Warrnambool
- Height: 188 cm (6 ft 2 in)
- Weight: 103 kg (227 lb)
- Positions: Ruckman, back pocket, full forward

Playing career^{1}
Years	Club	Games (Goals)
1965–1977	St Kilda	256 (301)

Coaching career
Years	Club	Games (W–L–D)
1978–1983	Ainslie	
1984–1987	Central District	
1993–1995	Tuggeranong	
- ^{1} Playing statistics correct to the end of 1977.

Career highlights
- St Kilda best and fairest: 1973; VFL Premiership player: 1966; ACTAFL Premiership captain-coach: 1979, 1980, 1982, 1983; St Kilda leading goalkicker: 1966.; St Kilda Team of the Century (back pocket)

Kevin Neale (18 July 1945 – 16 September 2023) was an Australian rules footballer who played for St Kilda in the Victorian Football League (VFL). Later in his career, he was a player-coach or captain-coach for a number of teams in the Australian Capital Territory, before eventually becoming a full-time coach.

== St Kilda ==
Kevin Neale was born on 18 July 1945. He was recruited from Hampden Football League (HFL) club South Warrnambool, where he played in seven grand finals in a row. He was nicknamed "Cowboy". The origin of the nickname is uncertain; it was possibly for his bow-legs and his rolling gait, but coach Alan Jeans once said he played like a cowboy.

Recruited by St Kilda as a nineteen-year-old, 6 ft 2 in, 14 st 3 lb ruckman, Neale played his first match for St Kilda against North Melbourne on 22 May 1965 (round 6), as a back-pocket/ruckman. He initially played in the backline (as the first change, resting in the back-pocket ruckman), but was moved to full-forward in 1966. He was selected as the back-pocket ruckman in St Kilda's "Team of the Century" in May 2001. He kicked five goals in St Kilda's 1966 Grand Final win over Collingwood, and held the club record of 16 finals games, until it was beaten by Robert Harvey. Neale was known for a brutal bump on Peter Hudson in the 1971 VFL grand final. A concussed Hudson kicked into the man on the mark, losing his chance to beat Bob Pratt's record of 150 goals in a single season. The Saints went on to lose the match. Nonetheless, Neale won the club best and fairest award in 1973.

Neale played for Victoria in the interstate match against Tasmania in Hobart, on Saturday, 16 June 1967. He was selected at full-forward, and kicked four goals in the match (he was moved from full-forward in the second half because Victoria's centre half-forward Peter McKenna had not kicked a goal in the first half of the match).

At the end of the 1976 season, it was thought that Neale would retire from playing with St Kilda; however, the team prevailed upon him to play yet another season, and he played in 20 of St Kilda's 22 matches that season, playing his last match as the back-pocket ruckman, in a losing St Kilda side, 17.10 (112), against Richmond 25.21 (171) at the MCG on 27 August 1977 (round 22). In his VFL career at St Kilda, he had played in 256 games, and scored 301 goals.

== Australian Capital Territory ==
Towards the end of his career at St Kilda, numerous offers were made to Neale to leave St Kilda and take up a coaching position. At the start of 1975, he was offered the position of player-coach at Turvey Park in the South-West League for three years at $25,000 (equivalent to $199,530 in 2022) per annum. St Kilda talked him out of accepting the lucrative offer; however, towards the end of the 1975 season, the Albury Football Club in the Ovens & Murray Football League offered him a three-year contract totalling $35,000 (equivalent to $279,342 in 2022) as captain-coach, which worked out to be about $11,667 (equivalent to $67,740 in 2022) per annum, about one-third of the original Turvey Park offer.

In 1978, he moved to Canberra, and was appointed the captain-coach of the Ainslie Football Club. In that year, he was also the captain-coach of a combined Australian Capital Territory (ACT) team in the Escort Cup competition. He was still very effective at full-forward, setting a goal-kicking record in 1980. With Neale as its captain-coach, Ainslie won the premiership in 1979, 1980, 1982 and 1983.

Neale was the captain-coach of the combined ACT side that beat the Victorian team by 13 points, 13.17 (95) to 11.16 (82), on 6 July 1980 at Manuka Oval in front of a crowd of 10,600. He scored three goals.

Coached by Bill Stephen, the Victorian team included club captains and Brownlow medallists: Captain Francis Bourke of Richmond, Trevor Barker of St Kilda, Malcolm Blight of North Melbourne, Terry Bright of Geelong, Jim Buckley of Carlton, Robert DiPierdomenico of Hawthorn, Jim Edmond of Footscray, Robert Elliott of Melbourne, Neville Fields of South Melbourne, Laurie Fowler of Richmond, Steven Icke of North Melbourne, Rene Kink of Collingwood, Mark Lee of Richmond, Mark Maclure of Carlton, Alex Marcou of Carlton, Merv Neagle of Essendon, Jeff Sarau of St Kilda, Laurie Serafini of Fitzroy, and Michael Turner of Geelong.

For a number of reasons, Ainslie had experienced a dismal 1981 season; but, under the coaching of Neale and, particularly, due to his on-field leadership and strength at full-forward, Ainslie won the 1982 premiership. At the end of 1982, he was interviewed by St Kilda, with a view to him replacing Alex Jesaulenko. Neale demanded $50,000 as his salary (St Kilda eventually appointed the ex-Richmond coach Tony Jewell).

In 1983, he began the 1983 season as the captain-coach of the Ainslie Football Club, and continued to play a key role. With Neale in the team, Ainslie won the 1983 premiership; the fourth in his six years as captain-coach. In the 1980 season, he kicked 149 goals; in the 1981 season, he kicked 139 goals; and in the 1982 season, he kicked 125 goals.

== South Australia ==
Because he was no longer able to take the field as a player, Neale was reluctantly released by the Ainslie Football Club, since their club and team structure at the time demanded a playing coach (the club eventually appointed ex-Richmond/ex-Collingwood player Rod Oborne as the captain-coach for the 1984 season).

Cleared by Ainslie, Neale moved to coach the Central District Football Club in the SANFL. He was non-playing coach from 1984 to 1987.

== Tuggeranong ==
Neale coached the Tuggeranong Football Club for three seasons (1993–1995). He coached Ainslie again in 1998.

== Death ==
Kevin Neale died from complications of Alzheimer's disease on 16 September 2023, at age 78.
