= Daryl Griffiths =

Australian rules footballer, born 1945

Personal information
- Born: 6 November 1945 (age 80)
- Original team: Terang (HFL)
- Debut: Round 9, 22 June 1963, St Kilda vs. Essendon, at Windy Hill
- Height: 183 cm (6 ft 0 in)
- Weight: 82.5 kg (182 lb)

Playing career^{1}
| Years | Club | Games (Goals) |
| 1963–1970 | St Kilda | 123 (40) |
| 1972-1973 | Claremont | 42 (29) |
| Total | | 175 (69) |
- ^{1} Playing statistics correct to the end of 1970.

Career highlights
- Premiership player 1966; St Kilda Best and Fairest 1970; Victorian state representative 1967, 1969, 1970; First kick – first goal

Daryl Griffiths (born 6 November 1945) is a former Australian rules footballer who played for St Kilda in the VFL.

== VFL Career ==
A seventeen year old schoolboy recruited from Terang in the Western District, he spent some time in the reserves before getting a call up for the round 9 game against Essendon. Lining up at full forward he managed to kick a goal with his first kick in VFL football. Shortly afterwards he was flattened by Essendon's "Bluey" Shelton and left the ground with a broken collarbone in the same match.

Griffiths played with St Kilda in several positions including as ruck-rover in the 1966 premiership win.

Club best and fairest winner in 1970 in a talented side. In 1971 he stood out of football for the year as he had asked for a clearance to East Fremantle but the club wouldn't clear him. If you stood out of football for a year it automatically gave you an open clearance. He moved to Western Australia and choose to play for Claremont in the WAFL.

Griffths was captain-coach of Horsham's 1976 Wimmera Football League premiership team.
