= Barry Breen =

Australian rules footballer

Personal information
- Born: 7 January 1948 (age 78)
- Original team: Mentone Football Club
- Height: 191 cm (6 ft 3 in)
- Weight: 93 kg (205 lb)
- Position: Centre half forward / key defender

Playing career^{1}
Years	Club	Games (Goals)
1965–1982	St Kilda	300 (308)
- ^{1} Playing statistics correct to the end of 1982.

Career highlights
- St Kilda Premiership player 1966; St Kilda Leading Goalkicker 1970; St Kilda Captain 1979

Barry Breen (born 7 January 1948) is a former Australian rules footballer in the Victorian Football League, playing with St Kilda Football Club. Breen attended De La Salle College, Malvern. His grandfather was a Gaelic footballer with the Kerry senior team, winning an All-Ireland Senior Football Championship medal in 1914.

He kicked a wobbly punt that bounced through for a behind that broke the deadlock with Collingwood late in the 1966 Grand Final that became St Kilda's first and, to date, only premiership. He was captain in 1979 and former club games record holder having played in 300 career games. He was also the last member of the 1966 premiership team to retire. After retiring from football Breen became Sydney Swans general manager and was president of the Tasmanian Football League from 1992 until 1995.
