= Nick Riewoldt =

Australian rules footballer (born 1982)

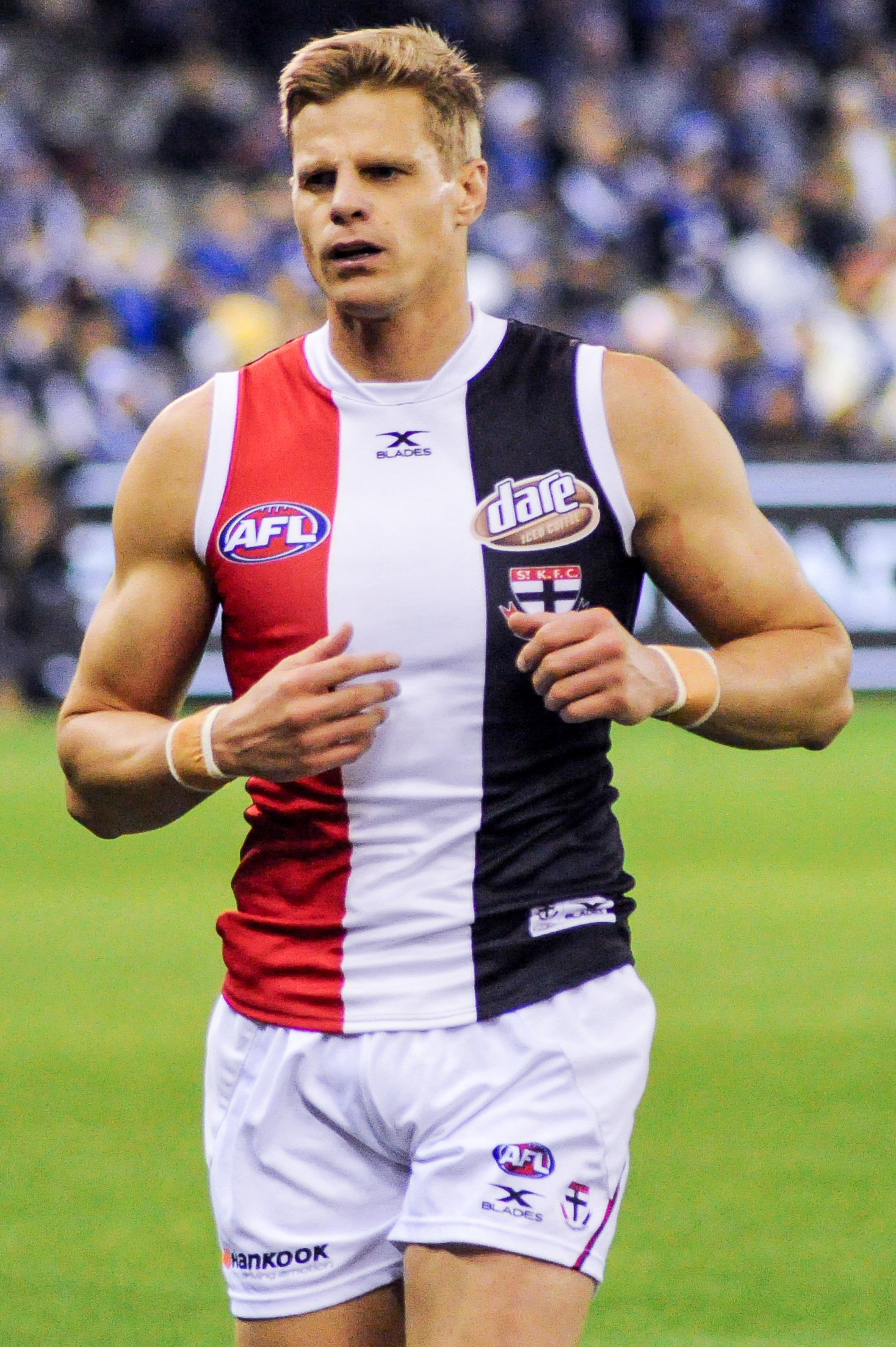
- Riewoldt in June 2017

Personal information
- Full name: Nicholas Fredrick Riewoldt
- Nickname: Rooey
- Born: 17 October 1982 (age 44); Hobart, Tasmania
- Original teams: Southport (QAFL); Broadbeach (QAFL)
- Draft: No. 1, 2000 national draft
- Height: 193 cm (6 ft 4 in)
- Weight: 97 kg (214 lb)
- Position: Forward

Playing career
Years	Club	Games (Goals)
2001–2017	St Kilda	336 (718)

International team honours^{2}
Years	Team	Games (Goals)
2004–2014	Australia	5 (0)
- ^{2} Representative statistics correct as of 2004.

Career highlights
- St Kilda captain: 2005, 2007–2016; 6x Trevor Barker Award: 2002, 2004, 2006, 2007, 2009, 2014; Leigh Matthews Trophy: 2004; 4x St Kilda leading goalkicker: 2008, 2009, 2013, 2014; 5x All-Australian team: 2004, 2006, 2008, 2009, 2014; AFL Rising Star: 2002; 2x Pre Season Premiership: 2004, 2008; Australian Football Hall of Fame: 2025

Nicholas Fredrick Riewoldt (/ˈriːvoʊlt/ REE-volt; born 17 October 1982) is a former Australian rules footballer who played for the St Kilda Football Club in the Australian Football League (AFL). He was the first draft selection in the 2000 AFL draft. He was the captain of St Kilda in 2005 and from 2007 to 2016. Riewoldt is a five-time All-Australian. He holds the all-time record for most marks in VFL/AFL history, surpassing Gary Dempsey in late 2017.

== Early life ==
Born in Hobart, Tasmania, to father Joerg ("Joe", a former Clarence and Coolangatta player) and mother Fiona, Riewoldt and his family moved to the Gold Coast, Queensland, when he was 9 years old. He attended Robina State Primary School from grade 5 alongside close friend Sam Stosur and became the school's vice-captain and UNICEF representative. He later switched to All Saints Anglican School for his secondary schooling years. Australian rules football was not offered in many Queensland schools at the time, but he made a name for himself as an overall sportsman, participating in the school's athletics, cross country, cricket, soccer and touch football teams at a high level. Academically, he also excelled in the studies of physics and chemistry.

Riewoldt played his junior and early senior football at the Broadbeach Cats before moving to the Southport Sharks, where he was identified as an outstanding junior talent. He was selected to represent Queensland at the 2000 U18 National Championships and starred in the tournament, which earned him All-Australian honours. Riewoldt also played a crucial role in Southport's historic fourth consecutive QAFL premiership in 2000. After being kept virtually touchless for the first half while matched up on future Brisbane Lions premiership player Jamie Charman, Riewoldt was moved into the ruck and kicked two important goals in Southport's 11-point grand final victory.

Growing up, Riewoldt supported the Hawthorn Football Club. He is the first cousin of Richmond footballer Jack Riewoldt, who also played as a forward.

== AFL career ==
Riewoldt was the No. 1 Draft Pick in the 2000 AFL draft and made his debut in 2001. He won the AFL Rising Star Award in 2002, earning his nomination in round 5 for his efforts in a drawn match against Sydney.

=== 2004 season ===
His breakout season was 2004 when he took an AFL record 256 marks and also finished in the top ten for both the Coleman and Brownlow medals. He received the AFL Players Association Most Valuable Player Award, the Leigh Matthews Trophy and was selected in the 2004 All-Australian Team for the first time.

=== 2005 season ===
Riewoldt was rewarded for his 2004 efforts when St Kilda named him club captain for 2005 as part of their rotating captaincy policy. His 2005 season began badly as he broke his collarbone in the third quarter of the first game of the season against the Brisbane Lions. This drew controversy as he was then bumped after the injury by Lions players Chris Scott and Mal Michael. The pair were not asked to face the AFL tribunal on charges of misconduct for targeting an injured player as it was ruled that they would not have known that Riewoldt was injured, that Riewoldt had waved away a trainer that was attending to the injury and that the bumps did not contribute to the injury.

=== 2006 season ===
Early in the 2006 season, Riewoldt returned close to his best form, kicking five goals against former powerhouse Brisbane in Round 3. This match seemed to have put Riewoldt's kicking "yips" to bed, but they returned during the Round 7 match against Geelong when he missed a simple but critical goal from 15 metres out. This miss was forgotten the next week when Riewoldt kicked 9 goals against Carlton and took many contested marks. Riewoldt also took a match saving mark for the Saints against Sydney in Round 11, a match the Saints won in wet conditions, and one that kept their finals hopes alive.

Riewoldt topped off the 2006 season by winning his third Trevor Barker Award. In achieving this feat, Riewoldt has already emulated some of the Saints greatest players such as the 1966 premiership captain Darrel Baldock, former skipper Nathan Burke and past champions Wells Eicke, Jack Davis and Jim Ross. Riewoldt was recognised for his season with selection in the 2006 All-Australian Team as a forward player, his second career All-Australian Team award.

=== 2007 season ===
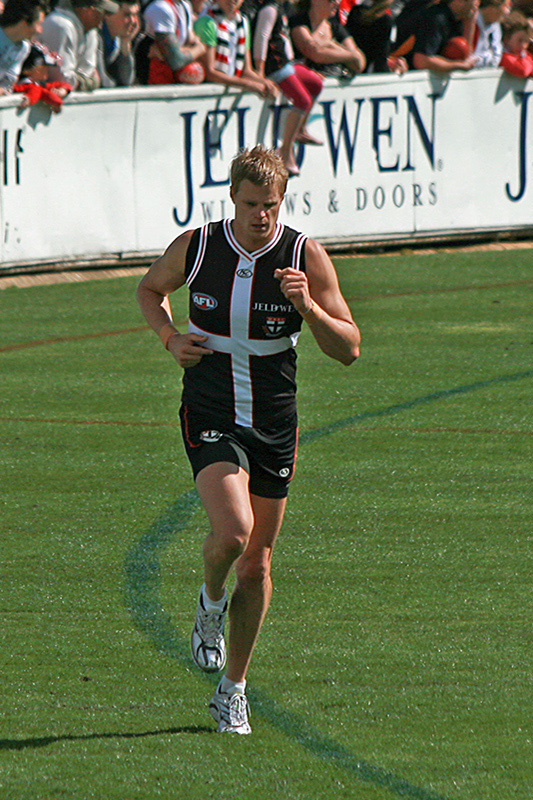
Riewoldt at training prior to the 2009 AFL Grand Final

At the beginning of the 2007 season, Lyon appointed Riewoldt Co-Captain of the St Kilda Football Club, along with Luke Ball and Lenny Hayes, both former captains themselves. Back and hamstring injuries forced Riewoldt to miss the first two matches of the season. Riewoldt started the season well, with eight goals in his first two matches. In Round 7, Riewoldt dominated against the Sydney Swans, which kick started another outstanding year. Despite the Saints missing the finals, Riewoldt enjoyed a better year statistically than 2004, narrowly winning St Kilda's best and fairest Trevor Barker Award ahead of defender Sam Fisher.

=== 2008 season ===
At the beginning of the season, Riewoldt assumed the sole captaincy of the club.

Riewoldt played in St Kilda's 2008 NAB Cup winning side – the club's third pre-season cup win. Riewoldt had a consistent 2008 season, coming second in the AFL for marks (behind Matthew Richardson) and kicking 57 home and away season goals (63 all up) to finish ninth in the competition. This performance earned him his third All-Australian selection, his first at centre-half-forward. He was also selected to play in the Hall of Fame Tribute Match, but was ultimately unable to play due to a knee injury.

=== 2009 season ===
Early in the season Riewoldt became a target for the fledgling Gold Coast Football Club, which was awarded the 17th licence to enter the AFL in 2011. However, he knocked back their offer to remain at St Kilda.

Riewoldt took the most marks of any player in the league, averaging 9.7 a game and kicking 65 goals in the home and away season, averaging 3.3 a game.

He was a significant player in a St Kilda team that went through the home and away season with 20 wins and 2 defeats.

Riewoldt played in 21 of 22 matches in the 2009 home-and-away rounds in which St Kilda qualified in first position for the finals series, winning the club's third minor premiership.

Riewoldt was recognised for his season with selection in the 2009 All-Australian Team as a forward player. He was also named captain of the 2009 All-Australian Team, his fourth All-Australian Team award.

In the preliminary final against the Western Bulldogs, Riewoldt kicked four goals, one of which was in the final minutes..

St Kilda qualified for the 2009 AFL Grand Final after qualification and preliminary finals wins but were defeated by Geelong by 12 points. Riewoldt kicked one goal.

Riewoldt won the 2009 Trevor Barker Award for St Kilda's best and fairest player, setting a new club record of five career best and fairest awards. He was also St Kilda's leading goal kicker in 2009.

=== 2010 season ===
During St Kilda's 28-point Round 3 win over Collingwood, on 9 April 2010, Riewoldt experienced a high-grade hamstring tear. He underwent surgery and made his return in Round 15, playing 15 games in the season for 39 goals.

Riewoldt would play in the drawn 2010 AFL Grand Final and its subsequent replay, also against Collingwood.

In the first game, Riewoldt kicked two goals and was among St Kilda's best players. After the game, the two captains, Riewoldt and Nick Maxwell of Collingwood, both stated that they would have preferred an extra time period. Ultimately, this would be the last grand final to be replayed, as a provision for extra time in the case of a draw was introduced in 2016.

In the second game, however, Riewoldt was infamously chased down and tackled to prevent an otherwise certain goal from point-blank range by Collingwood's Heath Shaw. St Kilda ultimately lost the replay by 56 points.

=== 2016 season ===
On 1 September 2016, at the Saints' best-and-fairest awards night, Riewoldt announced that he would stand down as St Kilda captain.

=== 2017 season ===
On 31 July 2017, Riewoldt announced that he would retire at the end of the season. He played the final game of his career in Round 23 when he had 15 disposals, 8 marks and 1 goal in a loss to the Richmond Tigers, his cousin's team. In Round 17, it was thought Riewoldt had beaten Gary Dempsey's supposed tally of 2,906 marks, but research not long after by veteran statistician Col Hutchinson revealed that there were possession stats missing from a game from Dempsey's career, with only his goal in that game being counted towards his stats. Nevertheless, Riewoldt broke the record beyond all reasonable doubt before the end of his final season, taking 38 more marks than Dempsey's recorded tally. For reference, Brian Lake holds the post-1999 record for most marks in a game, with 24.

== Personal life ==
Riewoldt is married to Cath. The pair married in October 2012 at her parents' property in Waco, Texas, United States. They have three sons, born in 2014, 2016 and 2019.

His sister Madeleine died of aplastic anaemia, a rare bone marrow condition, in February 2015 at the age of 26. Riewoldt and his family established Maddie Riewoldt's Vision to raise funds for research into new treatments for blood cancers. Once a year during the AFL season, when the St Kilda Saints (Nick Riewoldt's team) and the Richmond Tigers (his cousin Jack Riewoldt's) are scheduled to play against each other, it has become known as "Maddie's Match" and acts as a fundraiser to find new and improved treatments for aplastic anaemia.

He was the winner of the second season of Celebrity MasterChef Australia.

== Statistics ==
Riewoldt's player profile at AFL Tables:

Legend
G	Goals	K	Kicks	D	Disposals	T	Tackles
B	Behinds	H	Handballs	M	Marks

Led the league for the Season only*
Led the league after finals only*
Led the league after Season and Finals*

*10 games required to be eligible.

Season	Team	No.	Games	Totals							Averages (per game)						
Season	Team	No.	Games	G	B	K	H	D	M	T	G	B	K	H	D	M	T
2001	St Kilda	12	6	2	2	43	14	57	26	3	0.3	0.3	7.2	2.3	9.5	4.3	0.5
2002	St Kilda	12	22	21	18	225	94	319	178	30	1.0	0.8	10.2	4.3	14.5	8.1	1.4
2003	St Kilda	12	22	30	17	241	110	351	170	29	1.4	0.8	11.0	5.0	16.0	7.7	1.3
2004	St Kilda	12	25	67	32	324	108	432	256	25	2.7	1.3	13.0	4.3	17.3	10.2	1.0
2005	St Kilda	12	16	33	36	182	50	232	131	18	2.1	2.3	11.4	3.1	14.5	8.2	1.1
2006	St Kilda	12	23	60	35	299	86	385	214	23	2.6	1.5	13.0	3.7	16.7	9.3	1.0
2007	St Kilda	12	20	42	25	68	194	361	194	20	2.1	1.3	14.7	3.4	18.1	9.7	1.0
2008	St Kilda	12	24	65	39	288	122	410	240	18	2.7	1.6	12.0	5.1	17.1	10.0	0.8
2009	St Kilda	12	24	78	47	318	95	413	231	51	3.3	2.0	13.3	4.0	17.2	9.6	2.1
2010	St Kilda	12	15	39	34	174	83	257	120	26	2.6	2.3	11.6	5.5	17.1	8.0	1.7
2011	St Kilda	12	22	36	31	221	133	354	154	50	1.6	1.4	10.0	6.0	16.1	7.0	2.3
2012	St Kilda	12	19	47	31	200	76	276	125	47	2.5	1.6	10.5	4.0	14.5	6.6	2.5
2013	St Kilda	12	21	50	36	281	109	390	202	41	2.4	1.7	13.4	5.2	18.6	9.6	2.0
2014	St Kilda	12	22	49	21	262	105	367	191	31	2.2	1.0	11.9	4.8	16.7	8.7	1.4
2015	St Kilda	12	17	29	15	214	73	287	165	28	1.7	0.9	12.6	4.3	16.9	9.7	1.6
2016	St Kilda	12	21	41	24	300	136	436	222	40	2.0	1.1	14.3	6.5	20.8	10.6	1.9
2017	St Kilda	12	17	29	12	186	100	286	125	38	1.7	0.7	10.9	5.9	16.8	7.4	2.2
Career			336	718	455	4051	1562	5613	2944	518	2.1	1.4	12.1	4.6	16.7	8.8	1.5

== Honours and achievements ==
Brownlow Medal votes
Season	Votes
2001	—
2002	11
2003	7
2004	17
2005	3
2006	8
2007	14
2008	12
2009	15
2010	8
2011	4
2012	9
2013	5
2014	11
2015	6
2016	19
2017	4
Total	153

Team

- Pre-Season Cup (St Kilda): 2004, 2008

Individual

- Trevor Barker Award: 2002, 2004, 2006, 2007, 2009, 2014
- Leigh Matthews Trophy (AFLPA MVP Award): 2004
- All-Australian: 2004, 2006, 2008, 2009 (C), 2014 (VC)
- All-Australian: Captain 2009; Vice-Captain 2014)
- Australian Football Media Association Player of the Year: 2004
- Australian Representative Honours in International Rules Football: 2004, 2014, 2015
- AFL Rising Star Award: 2002
- AFL Rising Star Nominee: 2002 (Round 5)
- St Kilda F.C. Leading Club Goalkicker Award: 2008, 2009, 2013, 2014
- St Kilda F.C. Captain: 2005, 2007–2016
- Most marks in a season: Six times
- Most goals kicked and most games played at Docklands Stadium
