= Trevor Barker Award =

Australian rules football award

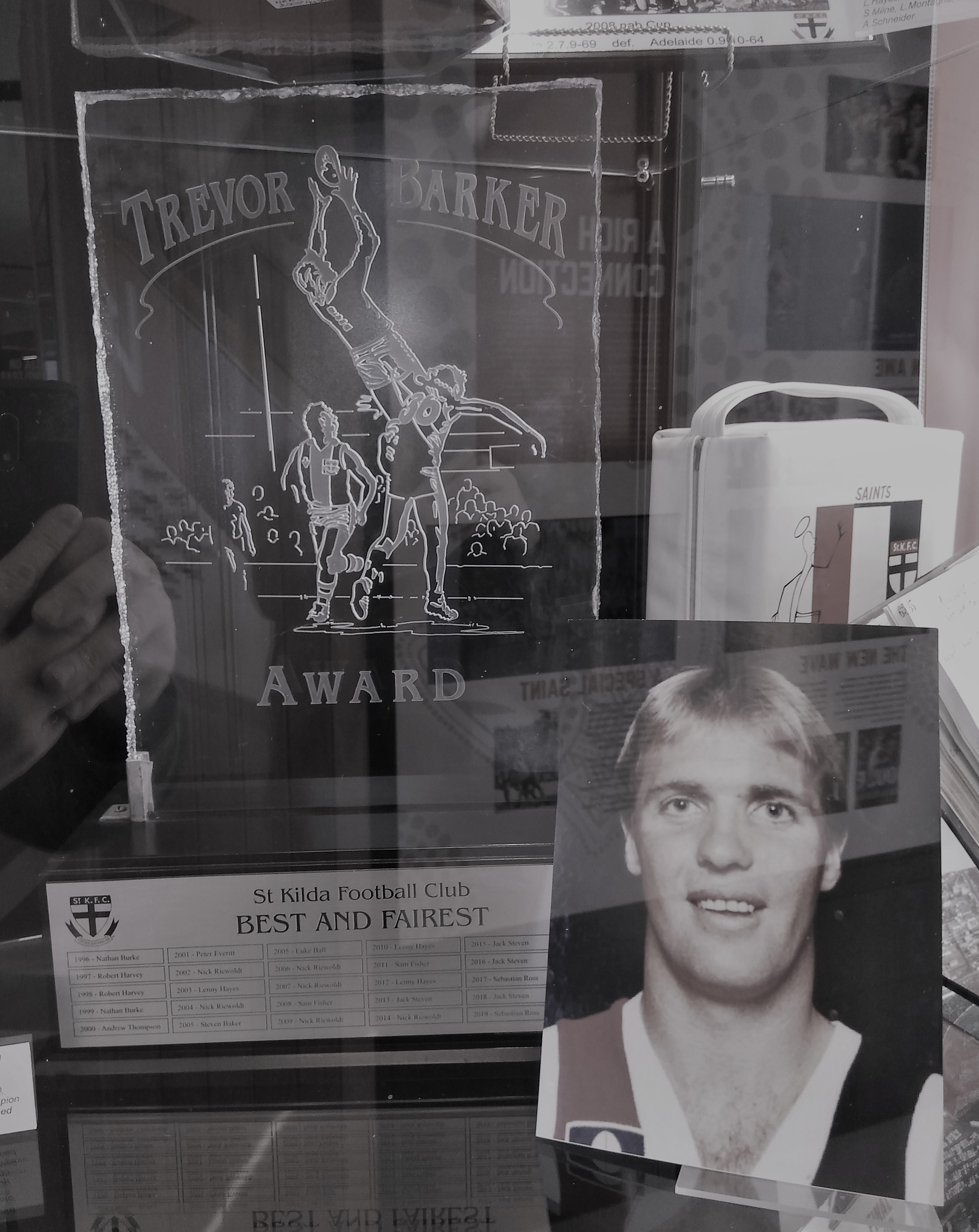
St Kilda FC Trevor Barker Award

The Trevor Barker Award is an Australian rules football award for the player voted the St Kilda Football Club best and fairest player during the home and away season in the Australian Football League by a voting panel.

The St Kilda Best & Fairest Award was first inaugurated in 1914. It was re-named the Trevor Barker Award in the 1990s in honour of St Kilda Hall of Fame Legend, Australian Football Hall of Fame inductee, club captain, dual best & fairest winner and reserves coach Trevor Barker, who died in 1996 aged 39.

Nick Riewoldt has won the most awards, notching up six wins between 2002 and 2014.

The voting system, as of the 2017 AFL season, consists of five coaches giving players a ranking from one to four after each match. Players can receive a maximum of 20 votes for a game.

The winning player receives a smaller replica of the main trophy each season, along with medals awarded for the players who finish in the top three. The awards name is also the name of the St Kilda Football Club's main player awards event, held at the conclusion of each season. The ceremony also includes the Robert Harvey Best Clubman Award, the Lenny Hayes Crest Player Award, the Best Emerging Player Award, and the publicly voted Sainter of the Year award.

== Recipients ==
+	Player won Brownlow Medal in same season
#	Player won Coleman Medal in same season
*	Player won AFL PA MVP in same season
~	Player won Norm Smith Medal in same season
^	Current player

Season	Recipient(s)	Ref.
1914	Wels Eicke	
1915	Wels Eicke (2)	
1916	—N/a	
1917	—N/a	
1918	Roy Cazaly	
1919	Wels Eicke (3)	
1920	Wally Cameron	
1921	Bill Cubbins	
1922	Barney Carr	
1923	Bill Cubbins (2)	
1924	Colin Watson	
1925	Cyril Gambetta	
1926	Horrie Mason	
1926	Harold Matthews	
1927	Harold Matthews (2)	
1928	Bill Cubbins (3)	
1929	Bill Cubbins (4)	
1930	Fred Phillips	
1931	Harry Neill	
1932	Bill Mohr	
1933	Harry Comte	
1934	Jack Davis	
1935	Jack Davis (2)	
1936	Bill Mohr# (2)	
1937	Jack Davis (3)	
1938	Stan Lloyd	
1939	Roy Fountain	
1940	Alan Killigrew	
1941	Reg Garvin	
1942	Ken Walker	
1943	Ken Walker (2)	
1944	Reg Garvin (2)	
1945	Harold Bray	
1946	Keith Rosewarne	
1947	Harold Bray (2)	
1948	Robert Hancock	
1949	Jim Ross	
1950	Bruce Phillips	
1951	Jim Ross (2)	
1952	Jim Ross (3)	
1953	Keith Drinan	
1954	Les Foote	
1955	Neil Roberts	
1956	Keith Drinan (2)	
1957	Brian Gleeson+	
1958	Neil Roberts+ (2)	
1959	Verdun Howell+	
1960	Lance Oswald	
1961	Lance Oswald (2)	
1962	Darrel Baldock	
1963	Darrel Baldock (2)	
1964	Ian Stewart	
1965	Darrel Baldock (3)	
1966	Ian Stewart+ (2)	
1967	Ross Smith+	
1968	Carl Ditterich	
1969	Bob Murray	
1970	Daryl Griffiths	
1971	Ross Smith (2)	
1972	Stuart Trott	
1973	Kevin Neale	
1974	Glenn Elliott	
1975	Jeff Sarau	
1976	Trevor Barker	
1977	Jeff Sarau (2)	
1978	Graeme Gellie	
1979	Jeff Dunne	
1980	Jeff Dunne (2)	
1981	Trevor Barker (2)	
1982	Peter Kiel	
1983	Max Crow	
1984	Greg Burns	
1985	Paul Morwood	
1986	Greg Burns (2)	
1987	Tony Lockett+#*	
1988	Danny Frawley	
1989	Nicky Winmar	
1990	Stewart Loewe	
1991	Tony Lockett# (2)	
1992	Robert Harvey	
1993	Nathan Burke	
1994	Robert Harvey (2)	
1995	Nicky Winmar (2)	
1996	Nathan Burke (2)	
1997	Robert Harvey+* (3)	
1998	Robert Harvey+ (4)	
1999	Nathan Burke (3)	
2000	Andrew Thompson	
2001	Peter Everitt	
2002	Nick Riewoldt	
2003	Lenny Hayes	
2004	Nick Riewoldt* (2)	
2005	Steven Baker	
2005	Luke Ball	
2006	Nick Riewoldt (3)	
2007	Nick Riewoldt (4)	
2008	Sam Fisher	
2009	Nick Riewoldt (5)	
2010	Lenny Hayes~ (2)	
2011	Sam Fisher (2)	
2012	Lenny Hayes (3)	
2013	Jack Steven	
2014	Nick Riewoldt (6)	
2015	Jack Steven (2)	
2016	Jack Steven (3)	
2017	Sebastian Ross	
2018	Jack Steven (4)	
2019	Sebastian Ross (2)	
2020	Jack Steele	
2021	Jack Steele (2)	
2022	Jack Sinclair^	
2023	Jack Sinclair^ (2)	
2024	Callum Wilkie^	
2025	Nasiah Wanganeen-Milera^	
2026	Callum Wilkie^ (2)	

== Multiple winners ==
^	Denotes current player

Player	Medals	Seasons
Nick Riewoldt	6	2002, 2004, 2006, 2007, 2009, 2014
Bill Cubbins	4	1921, 1923, 1928, 1929
Robert Harvey	4	1992, 1994, 1997, 1998
Jack Steven	4	2013, 2015, 2016, 2018
Darrel Baldock	3	1962, 1963, 1965
Nathan Burke	3	1993, 1996, 1999
Jack Davis	3	1934, 1935, 1937
Wels Eicke	3	1914, 1915, 1919
Lenny Hayes	3	2003, 2010, 2012
Jim Ross	3	1949, 1951, 1952
Jack Sinclair^	2	2022, 2023
Jack Steele	2	2020, 2021
Sebastian Ross	2	2017, 2019
Callum Wilkie	2	2024, 2026
Nicky Winmar	2	1989, 1995
