= Wally Cameron =

Australian rules footballer

Personal information
- Full name: Walter Pullar Cameron
- Born: 13 November 1896; Orbost, Victoria
- Died: 22 April 1957 (aged 60); Richmond, Victoria
- Original team: Orbost

Playing career^{1}
| Years | Club | Games (Goals) |
| 1920–1923 | St Kilda | 25 (23) |
- ^{1} Playing statistics correct to the end of 1923.

Walter Pullar Cameron (13 November 1896 – 22 April 1957) was an Australian rules footballer who played with St Kilda in the VFL during the 1920s.

Cameron was invited by St Kilda to train with the hope of getting a game in 1920. He won their Club Champion award in his debut season. More interested in setting himself up for life rather than playing football, Cameron established himself in Wodonga where he ran a business.

He found himself playing for St. Patricks, the catholic team based in Albury. St Patricks was the dominant team in the Ovens & Murray Football League in the 1920s in Albury until sectarian violence forced the league to act and redistribute the players by location not religion.
