= Jack Steven =

Australian rules footballer (born 1990)

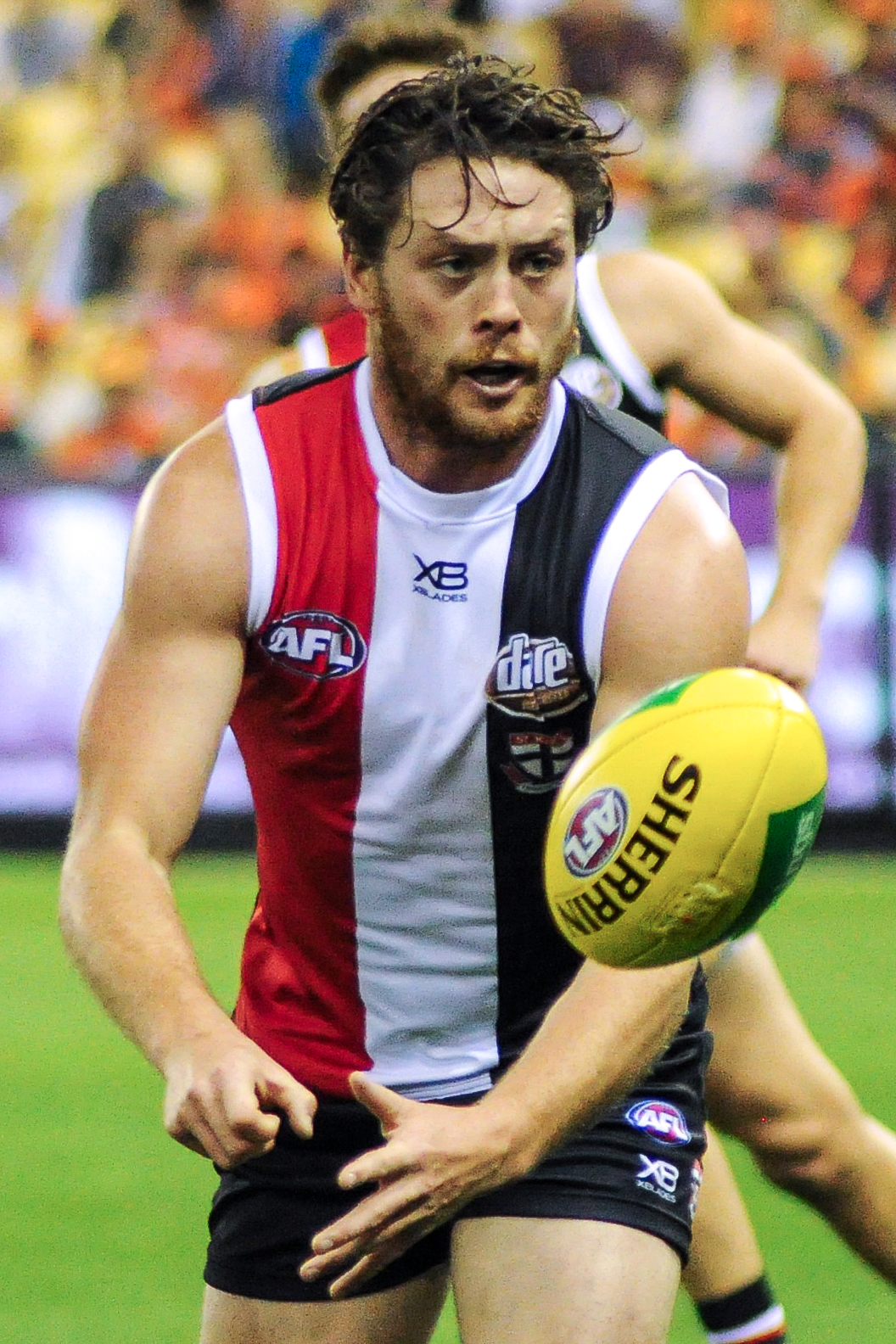
- Steven playing for St Kilda in April 2019

Personal information
- Full name: Jack Steven
- Nickname: Stuv
- Born: 28 March 1990 (age 36)
- Original team: Geelong Falcons (TAC Cup)
- Draft: No. 42, 2007 national draft
- Debut: Round 19, 2009, St Kilda vs. Hawthorn, at Aurora Stadium
- Height: 180 cm (5 ft 11 in)
- Weight: 84 kg (185 lb)
- Position: Midfielder

Playing career^{1}
Years	Club	Games (Goals)
2009–2019	St Kilda	183 (112)
2020	Geelong	9 (1)
Total		192 (113)
- ^{1} Playing statistics correct to the end of 2020.

Career highlights
- 4× Trevor Barker Award: 2013, 2015, 2016, 2018; AFL Rising Star nominee: 2011

Jack Steven (born 28 March 1990) is a former Australian rules footballer who played for the St Kilda Football Club and Geelong Cats in the Australian Football League (AFL). During his time at St Kilda, where he played 183 games, Steven won the club's best and fairest award four times. At the peak of his career, from 2015 through 2018, Steven polled double-figure votes in the Brownlow Medal in each season, highlighting his consistency and value to the Saints' midfield.

== AFL career ==
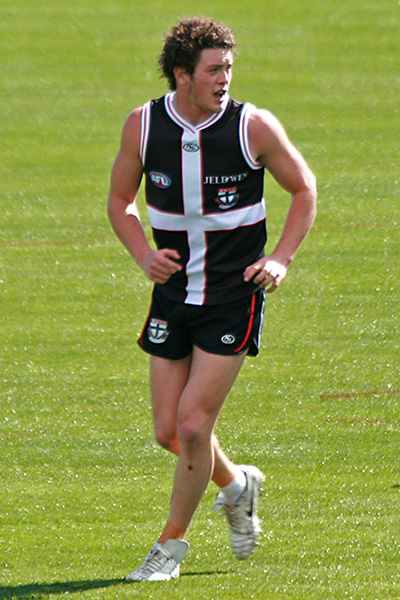
Steven at training prior to the 2009 AFL Grand Final

Originally from the Lorne Football Club, he attended Northfield Grammar. Steven was recruited from the Geelong Falcons with pick 42 in the 2007 AFL draft. Steven kicked the final goal of the 2008 NAB Cup quarter final – a competition which St Kilda went on to win, although Steven did not play in the final.

Steven made his AFL debut in Round 19 of the 2009 AFL season in the Saints' upset win over Hawthorn at York Park in Launceston, Tasmania when the then undefeated Saints were without seven of their best player due to injuries. It was his only AFL game for the year, but he played eight more in 2010.

In January 2011, Steven, along with three teammates, was suspended for six weeks and fined after breaking team rules involving alcohol, prescription medicine and leaving the team hotel while on a team camp in New Zealand. In Round 10, 2011, Steven was nominated for the 2011 AFL Rising Star.

During 2013, Steven established himself as an emerging talent, winning the 2013 Trevor Barker Award for St Kilda's best and fairest player.

In March 2015, Steven signed a new contract with the Saints, committing to the club until the end of the 2020 season. Steven played in all 22 games for St Kilda in 2015, averaging 27 disposals and kicking 9 goals. He was awarded his second Trevor Barker medal, finishing with 175 votes.

Steven was inducted into St Kilda's leadership group prior to the 2016 AFL season. He won his second successive Trevor Barker Award and third overall.

In February 2019, Steven took an indefinite leave from football to deal with mental health problems. and returned to the club the following month. He featured in four of the club's first six games of the season, but left the club again in May to continue to take care of his mental health, before returning the following month.

At the conclusion of the 2019 AFL season, Steven requested a trade to Geelong. The trade was completed on 16 October, the last day of the trade period. Without having played a game for Geelong, Steven made headlines in May 2020 after suffering what was reported as a "non-life threatening" stabwound to the chest.

Steven announced his retirement in November 2020, despite having one season remaining on his contract.

== Statistics ==
Statistics are correct to the end of the 2020 season

Legend
G	Goals	K	Kicks	D	Disposals	T	Tackles
B	Behinds	H	Handballs	M	Marks

Season	Team	No.	Games	Totals							Averages (per game)							Votes
Season	Team	No.	Games	G	B	K	H	D	M	T	G	B	K	H	D	M	T	Votes
2008	St Kilda	34	0	—	—	—	—	—	—	—	—	—	—	—	—	—	—	0
2009	St Kilda	34	1	1	0	10	4	14	5	4	1.0	0.0	10.0	4.0	14.0	5.0	4.0	0
2010	St Kilda	3	8	10	2	50	40	90	21	31	1.3	0.3	6.3	5.0	11.3	2.6	3.9	0
2011	St Kilda	3	21	13	10	228	183	411	78	84	0.6	0.5	10.9	8.7	19.6	3.7	4.0	3
2012	St Kilda	3	21	17	9	250	175	425	78	84	0.8	0.4	11.9	8.3	20.2	3.7	4.0	1
2013	St Kilda	3	22	16	8	312	279	591	83	87	0.7	0.4	14.2	12.7	26.9	3.8	4.0	8
2014	St Kilda	3	17	8	10	206	187	393	44	79	0.5	0.6	12.1	11.0	23.1	2.6	4.6	1
2015	St Kilda	3	22	9	15	343	248	591	98	151	0.4	0.7	15.6	11.3	26.9	4.5	6.9	12
2016	St Kilda	3	22	14	6	310	305	615	62	123	0.6	0.3	14.1	13.9	28.0	2.8	5.6	16
2017	St Kilda	3	20	6	15	259	267	526	55	93	0.3	0.8	13.0	13.4	26.3	2.8	4.7	11
2018	St Kilda	3	22	13	7	305	288	593	88	78	0.6	0.3	13.9	13.1	27.0	4.0	3.5	18
2019	St Kilda	3	7	5	4	78	55	84	8	17	0.3	0.8	13.0	8.0	19.0	2.0	4.3	3
2020 (Note: The 2020 season was played with 17 home-and-away matches per team (down from 22) and 16-minute quarters with time on (down from 20-minute quarters with time on) due to the impact of the COVID-19 pandemic.)	Geelong	9	9	1	2	84	64	148	33	35	0.1	0.2	9.3	7.1	16.4	3.7	3.9	0
Career			192	113	88	2435	2095	4530	664	872	0.6	0.5	12.7	10.9	23.6	3.5	4.5	73

== Honours and achievements ==
Individual

- 4× Trevor Barker Award: 2013, 2015, 2016, 2018
- AFL Rising Star nominee: 2011
