= Jeff Dunne (footballer) =

Australian rules footballer (1956–2020)

- Dunne with St Kilda

Personal information
- Born: 14 May 1956
- Died: 14 September 2020 (aged 64)
- Original team: North Ballarat (BFL)
- Height: 178 cm (5 ft 10 in)
- Weight: 75 kg (165 lb)
- Position: Back pocket

Playing career^{1}
Years	Club	Games (Goals)
1977–1983	St Kilda	101 (20)
1984	Richmond	1 (0)
Total		102 (20)
- ^{1} Playing statistics correct to the end of 1984.

Career highlights
- 2x St Kilda Best and Fairest: 1979, 1980; Victorian state representative

Jeffrey Dunne (14 May 1956 – 14 September 2020) was an Australian rules footballer who played 102 games for St Kilda and Richmond in the top tier Victorian Football League during the 1970s and 1980s.

Recruited from the North Ballarat Football Club in the Ballarat Football League, he played for St Kilda as a hard running back pocket and later represented Victoria in State of Origin matches. He won the club's best and fairest award in 1979 and 1980.

Following an unsuccessful season with Richmond, Dunne coached East Launceston and North Launceston in the Tasmanian Football League in the mid-1980s.

Dunne died of a heart attack in September 2020, aged 64.
