= 2017 AFL season =

121st season of the Australian Football League (AFL)

2017 AFL premiership season
- Date: 23 March – 30 September
- Teams: 18
- Premiers: Richmond; 11th premiership
- Runners-up: Adelaide (1st runners-up)
- Minor premiers: Adelaide; 2nd minor premiership
- Brownlow Medallist: Dustin Martin; Richmond (36 votes)
- Coleman Medallist: Lance Franklin; Sydney (69 goals)

Attendance
- Matches played: 207
- Total attendance: 7,287,880 (35,207 per match)
- Highest (H&A): 87,685 (round 5, Essendon v Collingwood)
- Highest (finals): 100,021 (Grand Final, Adelaide vs. Richmond)

The 2017 AFL season was the 121st season of the Australian Football League (AFL), the highest level senior men's Australian rules football competition in Australia, which was known as the Victorian Football League until 1989. The season featured eighteen clubs, ran from 23 March until 30 September, and comprised a 22-game home-and-away season followed by a finals series featuring the top eight clubs.

The premiership was won by the Richmond Football Club for the eleventh time, after it defeated Adelaide by 48 points in the 2017 AFL Grand Final.

== Rule changes ==
The following amendments were made to the Laws of the Game for the 2017 season:

- Rules relating to around-the-ground ruck contests were amended such that only the nominated ruckman for each team is permitted in the contest, eliminating the option for another player to enter the contest and take the tap, otherwise known as the "third man up" strategy. This was done to make ruck contests easier to adjudicate, to reduce the risk of injuries to ruckmen, and to increase the value of the skill of ruckwork.
- A more stringent interpretation of deliberate rushed behinds was introduced, by allowing the umpire to consider prior opportunity, distance from the goal line and degree of applied pressure when judging whether or not to pay a free kick.
- Adjustments were made to the interpretation of high tackles, giving the umpire more discretion to call play-on when he deems that the tackled player is responsible for the high contact. This was introduced to discourage the practice of ducking into a tackle, dropping the knees when tackled or trying to shrug off a tackle to earn a free kick.
- A more stringent interpretation of punches to the body was introduced to the match review panel and tribunal to allow for suspensions to be imposed; and to allow fines to be imposed for low impact jumper punches.
- The deliberate out of bounds free kick was amended, lowering the threshold for a free kick from 'intentionally' putting the ball out of bounds to 'not demonstrating sufficient intent' to keep the ball in bounds.

== Pre-season ==
The pre-season series of matches in 2017 was known as the JLT Community Series; its new sponsor was Jardine Lloyd Thompson (JLT), who replaced National Australia Bank (NAB) after NAB elected to sponsor the inaugural AFL Women's season instead. The series featured 27 practice matches played over 25 days, beginning on 16 February and ending on 12 March. The matches were stand-alone, with no overall winner of the series. Each team played three games, many at suburban or regional venues. All matches were televised live on Fox Footy as well as on the AFL Live app. The nine-point super goal was used in these matches.

	Week 1
Thursday, 16 February (7:40 pm)	Collingwood 2.13.9 (105)	def.	Essendon 0.14.10 (94)	Etihad Stadium (crowd: 16,521)	Report
Friday, 17 February (7:40 pm)	Hawthorn 0.15.8 (98)	def.	Geelong 1.13.7 (94)	University of Tasmania Stadium (crowd: 8,512)	Report
Saturday, 18 February (2:05 pm)	Greater Western Sydney 0.10.10 (70)	def.	West Coast 0.5.7 (37)	Narrandera Sportsground (crowd: 3,984)	Report
Saturday, 18 February (4:40 pm)	Western Bulldogs 2.9.14 (86)	def. by	Melbourne 0.14.8 (92)	Whitten Oval (crowd: 7,581)	Report
Sunday, 19 February (2:05 pm)	Sydney 0.8.15 (63)	def. by	North Melbourne 0.9.11 (65)	Coffs Harbour International Stadium (crowd: 3,040)	Report
Sunday, 19 February (3:40 pm)	Gold Coast 0.11.15 (81)	def.	Brisbane Lions 1.7.6 (57)	Kombumerri Park, Merrimac (crowd: 2,174)	Report

	Week 2
Thursday, 23 February (7:40 pm)	St Kilda 0.8.9 (57)	def.	Port Adelaide 0.7.14 (56)	Etihad Stadium (crowd: 5,363)	Report
Friday, 24 February (7:40 pm)	Richmond 0.14.8 (92)	def.	Adelaide 0.10.13 (73)	Etihad Stadium (crowd: 7,262)	Report
Saturday, 25 February (2:05 pm)	Melbourne 0.17.14 (116)	def.	Carlton 0.9.8 (62)	Casey Fields (crowd: 7,256)	Report
Saturday, 25 February (3:40 pm)	West Coast 0.16.11 (107)	def.	Fremantle 0.8.4 (52)	Wonthella Oval, Geraldton (crowd: 8,880)	Report
Sunday, 26 February (2:05 pm)	North Melbourne 0.13.17 (95)	def.	Hawthorn 0.11.8 (74)	Arden Street Oval (crowd: 3,981)	Report
Sunday, 26 February (3:40 pm)	Gold Coast 0.12.7 (79)	def.	Essendon 0.12.4 (76)	Harrup Park Country Club (crowd: 3,893)	Report

	Week 3
Thursday, 2 March (7:40 pm)	Western Bulldogs 1.6.13 (58)	def. by	Brisbane Lions 0.10.6 (66)	Etihad Stadium (crowd: 4,901)	Report
Friday, 3 March (7:40 pm)	Greater Western Sydney 1.4.9 (42)	def. by	Sydney 0.8.6 (54)	Blacktown International Sportspark (crowd: 2,695)	Report
Saturday, 4 March (2:05 pm)	Carlton 0.4.6 (30)	def. by	St Kilda 0.18.14 (122)	Ikon Park (crowd: 15,485)	Report
Saturday, 4 March (1:40 pm)	Fremantle 1.11.12 (87)	def.	Collingwood 1.12.4 (85)	Rushton Park (crowd: 5,601)	Report
Sunday, 5 March (1:35 pm)	Adelaide 1.9.7 (70)	def.	Geelong 1.7.13 (64)	Richmond Oval (crowd: 3,800)	Report
Sunday, 5 March (4:10 pm)	Port Adelaide 0.7.9 (51)	def. by	Richmond 0.11.13 (79)	Malseed Park (crowd: 4,649)	Report

	Week 4
Thursday, 9 March (4:50 pm)	Gold Coast 0.16.9 (105)	def. by	Western Bulldogs 4.13.12 (126)	Metricon Stadium (crowd: 3,007)	Report
Thursday, 9 March (5:50 pm)	West Coast 0.14.11 (95)	def.	Melbourne 1.9.7 (70)	Domain Stadium (crowd: 5,337)	Report
Friday, 10 March (5:50 pm)	Greater Western Sydney 2.15.17 (125)	def.	North Melbourne 0.12.15 (87)	Manuka Oval (crowd: 3,997)	Report
Friday, 10 March (5:40 pm)	Fremantle 2.12.14 (104)	def.	Carlton 0.12.11 (83)	Domain Stadium (crowd: 6,639)	Report
Saturday, 11 March (1:10 pm)	Richmond 0.16.11 (107)	def. by	Collingwood 1.15.15 (114)	Ted Summerton Reserve (crowd: 5,701)	Report
Saturday, 11 March (3:40 pm)	Adelaide 1.20.13 (142)	def.	Brisbane Lions 1.15.4 (103)	Hickinbotham Oval (crowd: 4,350)	Report
Sunday, 12 March (12:40 pm)	Port Adelaide 0.14.12 (96)	def.	Hawthorn 1.8.11 (68)	Hickinbotham Oval (crowd: 5,628)	Report
Sunday, 12 March (4:10 pm)	Geelong 1.17.11 (122)	def.	Essendon 2.12.10 (100)	Queen Elizabeth Oval (crowd: 8,391)	Report
Sunday, 12 March (7:10 pm)	St Kilda 0.10.14 (74)	def. by	Sydney 0.11.11 (77)	Lavington Sports Ground (crowd: 6,893)	Report

== Premiership season ==
Notable features of the draw include:

- The naming rights of York Park were bought by the University of Tasmania from Aurora Energy in the week prior to the full fixture being released, with the venue becoming known as the University of Tasmania Stadium.
- Greater Western Sydney sold the naming rights for Manuka Oval during the AFL season to the University of New South Wales, and the stadium became known as the UNSW Canberra Oval.
- North Melbourne and the Western Bulldogs played in the AFL's first ever Good Friday match, which was played at Etihad Stadium.
- Port Adelaide and Gold Coast competed in the first AFL premiership match outside Australia and New Zealand when they played in round 8 at Jiangwan Stadium in Shanghai, China, with the match televised live on the Seven Network. Both teams had a bye the following round, while the remaining sixteen teams had their byes from rounds 11 to 13.
- Owing to redevelopment, Simonds Stadium was unavailable until round 9.
- The Western Bulldogs competed in the first AFL premiership match to be played at Mars Stadium in Ballarat when they faced Port Adelaide in round 22. The match was also the first AFL premiership match in a Victorian regional venue (other than Geelong) since a one-off round of promotional matches held in 1952.
- All starting times are local.

=== Round 1 ===
	Round 1
Thursday, 23 March (7:20 pm)	Carlton 14.5 (89)	def. by	Richmond 20.12 (132)	MCG (crowd: 73,137)	Report
Friday, 24 March (7:50 pm)	Collingwood 12.14 (86)	def. by	Western Bulldogs 15.10 (100)	MCG (crowd: 66,254)	Report
Saturday, 25 March (4:35 pm)	Sydney 12.10 (82)	def. by	Port Adelaide 17.8 (110)	SCG (crowd: 33,129)	Report
Saturday, 25 March (4:35 pm)	St Kilda 13.12 (90)	def. by	Melbourne 18.12 (120)	Etihad Stadium (crowd: 36,249)	Report
Saturday, 25 March (7:25 pm)	Essendon 17.14 (116)	def.	Hawthorn 12.19 (91)	MCG (crowd: 78,294)	Report
Saturday, 25 March (7:05 pm)	Gold Coast 14.12 (96)	def. by	Brisbane Lions 15.8 (98)	Metricon Stadium (crowd: 12,710)	Report
Sunday, 26 March (1:10 pm)	North Melbourne 13.15 (93)	def. by	West Coast 21.10 (136)	Etihad Stadium (crowd: 21,997)	Report
Sunday, 26 March (2:45 pm)	Adelaide 22.15 (147)	def.	Greater Western Sydney 14.7 (91)	Adelaide Oval (crowd: 43,993)	Report
Sunday, 26 March (4:40 pm)	Fremantle 10.13 (73)	def. by	Geelong 18.7 (115)	Domain Stadium (crowd: 34,638)	Report
Melbourne defeated St Kilda for the first time since the 2006 elimination final, ending a fourteen-match losing streak.; The match between North Melbourne and West Coast was the 15,000th VFL/AFL game played.; The match between Adelaide and Greater Western Sydney started five minutes earlier than initially scheduled due to the application of the heat policy, whereby each quarter break was extended by two minutes.; The total attendance of 400,401 for the round broke the record for the highest-attended round in VFL/AFL history, breaking the previous record of 371,212 set in round 15, 2013.

=== Round 2 ===
	Round 2
Thursday, 30 March (7:20 pm)	Richmond 14.15 (99)	def.	Collingwood 11.14 (80)	MCG (crowd: 58,236)	Report
Friday, 31 March (7:50 pm)	Western Bulldogs 16.14 (110)	def.	Sydney 13.9 (87)	Etihad Stadium (crowd: 42,834)	Report
Saturday, 1 April (1:45 pm)	Hawthorn 13.11 (89)	def. by	Adelaide 16.17 (113)	MCG (crowd: 37,420)	Report
Saturday, 1 April (4:35 pm)	Greater Western Sydney 24.16 (160)	def.	Gold Coast 8.10 (58)	Spotless Stadium (crowd: 8,022)	Report
Saturday, 1 April (6:25 pm)	Brisbane Lions 12.12 (84)	def. by	Essendon 17.9 (111)	Gabba (crowd: 21,749)	Report
Saturday, 1 April (4:40 pm)	West Coast 18.8 (116)	def.	St Kilda 13.19 (97)	Domain Stadium (crowd: 37,749)	Report
Sunday, 2 April (1:10 pm)	Geelong 17.10 (112)	def.	North Melbourne 17.9 (111)	Etihad Stadium (crowd: 30,917)	Report
Sunday, 2 April (3:20 pm)	Melbourne 13.8 (86)	def.	Carlton 9.10 (64)	MCG (crowd: 46,727)	Report
Sunday, 2 April (4:10 pm)	Port Adelaide 22.13 (145)	def.	Fremantle 8.8 (56)	Adelaide Oval (crowd: 38,388)	Report
Sydney's loss against the Western Bulldogs ended its 10-match winning streak at Etihad Stadium.

=== Round 3 ===
	Round 3
Friday, 7 April (7:50 pm)	Sydney 11.13 (79)	def. by	Collingwood 11.14 (80)	SCG (crowd: 35,310)	Report
Saturday, 8 April (1:45 pm)	North Melbourne 10.7 (67)	def. by	Greater Western Sydney 15.19 (109)	Blundstone Arena (crowd: 8,758)	Report
Saturday, 8 April (2:10 pm)	Richmond 11.10 (76)	def.	West Coast 8.17 (65)	MCG (crowd: 42,523)	Report
Saturday, 8 April (4:35 pm)	Geelong 20.6 (126)	def.	Melbourne 13.19 (97)	Etihad Stadium (crowd: 29,733)	Report
Saturday, 8 April (7:10 pm)	Port Adelaide 12.11 (83)	def. by	Adelaide 15.10 (100)	Adelaide Oval (crowd: 53,698)	Report
Saturday, 8 April (5:40 pm)	Fremantle 13.11 (89)	def.	Western Bulldogs 10.13 (73)	Domain Stadium (crowd: 28,865)	Report
Sunday, 9 April (1:10 pm)	St Kilda 14.23 (107)	def.	Brisbane Lions 11.10 (76)	Etihad Stadium (crowd: 23,097)	Report
Sunday, 9 April (3:20 pm)	Carlton 7.15 (57)	def.	Essendon 6.6 (42)	MCG (crowd: 48,022)	Report
Sunday, 9 April (4:40 pm)	Gold Coast 21.13 (139)	def.	Hawthorn 7.11 (53)	Metricon Stadium (crowd: 14,728)	Report
Gold Coast recorded its highest-ever winning margin of 86 points.; Gold Coast recorded its highest score in a quarter in its history, scoring 10.2 (62) in the third quarter.

=== Round 4 ===
	Round 4 (Easter)
Thursday, 13 April (6:10 pm)	West Coast 13.13 (91)	def.	Sydney 10.5 (65)	Domain Stadium (crowd: 38,065)	Report
Friday, 14 April (4:20 pm)	North Melbourne 12.14 (86)	def. by	Western Bulldogs 12.17 (89)	Etihad Stadium (crowd: 42,814)	Report
Saturday, 15 April (1:40 pm)	Melbourne 15.14 (104)	def. by	Fremantle 16.10 (106)	MCG (crowd: 27,829)	Report
Saturday, 15 April (4:35 pm)	Greater Western Sydney 16.16 (112)	def.	Port Adelaide 11.15 (81)	UNSW Canberra Oval (crowd: 9,185)	Report
Saturday, 15 April (7:25 pm)	Carlton 12.10 (82)	def. by	Gold Coast 17.6 (108)	Etihad Stadium (crowd: 24,968)	Report
Saturday, 15 April (7:10 pm)	Adelaide 24.9 (153)	def.	Essendon 13.10 (88)	Adelaide Oval (crowd: 47,492)	Report
Sunday, 16 April (3:20 pm)	Collingwood 7.13 (55)	def. by	St Kilda 9.15 (69)	Etihad Stadium (crowd: 36,650)	Report
Sunday, 16 April (4:40 pm)	Brisbane Lions 10.7 (67)	def. by	Richmond 17.17 (119)	Gabba (crowd: 21,669)	Report
Monday, 17 April (3:20 pm)	Hawthorn 6.12 (48)	def. by	Geelong 20.14 (134)	MCG (crowd: 62,360)	Report
Hawthorn's 86-point loss to Geelong was its heaviest loss against Geelong since round 10, 1949.

=== Round 5 ===
	Round 5 (ANZAC Round)
Friday, 21 April (7:20 pm)	Port Adelaide 20.17 (137)	def.	Carlton 6.11 (47)	Adelaide Oval (crowd: 43,120)	Report
Saturday, 22 April (1:45 pm)	Western Bulldogs 17.20 (122)	def.	Brisbane Lions 14.6 (90)	Etihad Stadium (crowd: 31,822)	Report
Saturday, 22 April (4:35 pm)	Gold Coast 13.8 (86)	def. by	Adelaide 23.15 (153)	Metricon Stadium (crowd: 12,672)	Report
Saturday, 22 April (7:25 pm)	Sydney 9.9 (63)	def. by	Greater Western Sydney 15.15 (105)	SCG (crowd: 34,824)	Report
Saturday, 22 April (5:40 pm)	Fremantle 9.13 (67)	def.	North Melbourne 9.8 (62)	Domain Stadium (crowd: 33,319)	Report
Sunday, 23 April (3:20 pm)	St Kilda 13.10 (88)	def. by	Geelong 19.12 (126)	Etihad Stadium (crowd: 33,884)	Report
Sunday, 23 April (4:40 pm)	Hawthorn 19.11 (125)	def.	West Coast 11.9 (75)	MCG (crowd: 28,997)	Report
Monday, 24 April (7:25 pm)	Richmond 12.16 (88)	def.	Melbourne 11.9 (75)	MCG (crowd: 85,657)	Report
Tuesday, 25 April (3:20 pm)	Essendon 15.10 (100)	def.	Collingwood 11.16 (82)	MCG (crowd: 87,685)	Report
The crowd of 85,657 between Richmond and Melbourne was the highest ever between these two teams.; This marked the first time in VFL/AFL history that two crowds in excess of 80,000 were drawn to matches in the same home-and-away round. Richmond and Melbourne drew in front of 85,657, and Essendon and Collingwood drew in front of 87,685.

=== Round 6 ===
	Round 6
Friday, 28 April (7:50 pm)	Greater Western Sydney 11.9 (75)	def.	Western Bulldogs 9.19 (73)	UNSW Canberra Oval (crowd: 14,048)	Report
Saturday, 29 April (1:45 pm)	Hawthorn 8.7 (55)	def. by	St Kilda 19.16 (130)	University of Tasmania Stadium (crowd: 15,571)	Report
Saturday, 29 April (2:10 pm)	Carlton 15.7 (97)	def.	Sydney 11.12 (78)	MCG (crowd: 32,678)	Report
Saturday, 29 April (4:35 pm)	Brisbane Lions 10.7 (67)	def. by	Port Adelaide 22.18 (150)	Gabba (crowd: 13,638)	Report
Saturday, 29 April (7:25 pm)	North Melbourne 16.11 (107)	def.	Gold Coast 14.10 (94)	Etihad Stadium (crowd: 15,431)	Report
Saturday, 29 April (6:10 pm)	West Coast 16.7 (103)	def.	Fremantle 9.8 (62)	Domain Stadium (crowd: 40,836)	Report
Sunday, 30 April (1:10 pm)	Essendon 10.14 (74)	def. by	Melbourne 17.10 (112)	Etihad Stadium (crowd: 44,040)	Report
Sunday, 30 April (3:20 pm)	Geelong 11.12 (78)	def. by	Collingwood 15.17 (107)	MCG (crowd: 46,457)	Report
Sunday, 30 April (4:10 pm)	Adelaide 21.14 (140)	def.	Richmond 10.4 (64)	Adelaide Oval (crowd: 51,069)	Report
Hawthorn's loss to St Kilda ended its 19-game winning streak at University of Tasmania Stadium.

=== Round 7 ===
	Round 7
Friday, 5 May (7:50 pm)	St Kilda 16.12 (108)	def.	Greater Western Sydney 12.13 (85)	Etihad Stadium (crowd: 21,160)	Report
Saturday, 6 May (1:45 pm)	North Melbourne 22.13 (145)	def.	Adelaide 13.8 (86)	Blundstone Arena (crowd: 10,064)	Report
Saturday, 6 May (2:10 pm)	Collingwood 8.8 (56)	def. by	Carlton 12.7 (79)	MCG (crowd: 70,279)	Report
Saturday, 6 May (4:05 pm)	Port Adelaide 12.15 (87)	def. by	West Coast 15.7 (97)	Adelaide Oval (crowd: 38,333)	Report
Saturday, 6 May (7:25 pm)	Gold Coast 18.16 (124)	def.	Geelong 15.9 (99)	Metricon Stadium (crowd: 13,648)	Report
Saturday, 6 May (7:25 pm)	Western Bulldogs 11.14 (80)	def.	Richmond 11.9 (75)	Etihad Stadium (crowd: 46,387)	Report
Sunday, 7 May (1:10 pm)	Sydney 20.15 (135)	def.	Brisbane Lions 12.9 (81)	SCG (crowd: 25,619)	Report
Sunday, 7 May (3:20 pm)	Melbourne 14.7 (91)	def. by	Hawthorn 14.10 (94)	MCG (crowd: 38,693)	Report
Sunday, 7 May (2:40 pm)	Fremantle 17.14 (116)	def.	Essendon 11.13 (79)	Domain Stadium (crowd: 33,393)	Report

=== Round 8 ===
	Round 8
Friday, 12 May (6:10 pm)	West Coast 9.15 (69)	def.	Western Bulldogs 8.13 (61)	Domain Stadium (crowd: 38,934)	Report
Saturday, 13 May (1:45 pm)	Hawthorn 17.11 (113)	def.	Brisbane Lions 11.9 (75)	University of Tasmania Stadium (crowd: 10,553)	Report
Saturday, 13 May (2:10 pm)	St Kilda 12.13 (85)	def.	Carlton 10.6 (66)	Etihad Stadium (crowd: 38,014)	Report
Saturday, 13 May (4:35 pm)	Greater Western Sydney 15.12 (102)	def.	Collingwood 15.9 (99)	Spotless Stadium (crowd: 11,360)	Report
Saturday, 13 May (7:25 pm)	Essendon 17.8 (110)	def.	Geelong 13.15 (93)	MCG (crowd: 57,172)	Report
Saturday, 13 May (7:10 pm)	Adelaide 9.12 (66)	def. by	Melbourne 17.5 (107)	Adelaide Oval (crowd: 47,882)	Report
Sunday, 14 May (1:10 pm)	Richmond 10.10 (70)	def. by	Fremantle 10.12 (72)	MCG (crowd: 31,200)	Report
Sunday, 14 May (1:15 pm)	Gold Coast 4.14 (38)	def. by	Port Adelaide 16.14 (110)	Jiangwan Stadium (crowd: 10,118)	Report
Sunday, 14 May (4:40 pm)	North Melbourne 11.12 (78)	def. by	Sydney 18.12 (120)	Etihad Stadium (crowd: 21,589)	Report
David Mundy of Fremantle kicked a goal after the final siren to defeat Richmond.

=== Round 9 ===
	Round 9
Friday, 19 May (7:50 pm)	Geelong 16.8 (104)	def.	Western Bulldogs 12.9 (81)	Simonds Stadium (crowd: 30,275)	Report
Saturday, 20 May (1:45 pm)	St Kilda 10.8 (68)	def. by	Sydney 18.10 (118)	Etihad Stadium (crowd: 29,778)	Report
Saturday, 20 May (4:35 pm)	Greater Western Sydney 11.12 (78)	def.	Richmond 10.15 (75)	Spotless Stadium (crowd: 10,677)	Report
Saturday, 20 May (7:25 pm)	Brisbane Lions 7.18 (60)	def. by	Adelaide 21.14 (140)	Gabba (crowd: 13,802)	Report
Saturday, 20 May (7:25 pm)	Collingwood 13.12 (90)	def.	Hawthorn 11.6 (72)	MCG (crowd: 54,252)	Report
Sunday, 21 May (1:10 pm)	Essendon 19.11 (125)	def.	West Coast 8.16 (64)	Etihad Stadium (crowd: 36,403)	Report
Sunday, 21 May (3:20 pm)	Melbourne 13.12 (90)	def. by	North Melbourne 15.14 (104)	MCG (crowd: 33,218)	Report
Sunday, 21 May (2:40 pm)	Fremantle 13.8 (86)	def.	Carlton 7.9 (51)	Domain Stadium (crowd: 30,313)	Report
	Bye; Gold Coast, Port Adelaide
Eleni Glouftsis was appointed field umpire for the Essendon vs West Coast match, becoming the first female to umpire a VFL/AFL premiership match.

=== Round 10 ===
	Round 10 (Sir Doug Nicholls Round)
Thursday, 25 May (7:20 pm)	Geelong 11.15 (81)	def.	Port Adelaide 11.13 (79)	Simonds Stadium (crowd: 24,909)	Report
Friday, 26 May (7:50 pm)	Sydney 11.9 (75)	def. by	Hawthorn 12.9 (81)	SCG (crowd: 36,221)	Report
Saturday, 27 May (1:45 pm)	Western Bulldogs 13.12 (90)	def.	St Kilda 7.8 (50)	Etihad Stadium (crowd: 34,685)	Report
Saturday, 27 May (4:05 pm)	Melbourne 18.14 (122)	def.	Gold Coast 13.9 (87)	TIO Traeger Park (crowd: 5,072)	Report
Saturday, 27 May (7:25 pm)	Richmond 11.15 (81)	def.	Essendon 10.6 (66)	MCG (crowd: 85,656)	Report
Saturday, 27 May (7:10 pm)	Adelaide 20.23 (143)	def.	Fremantle 6.7 (43)	Adelaide Oval (crowd: 42,415)	Report
Sunday, 28 May (1:10 pm)	Collingwood 18.21 (129)	def.	Brisbane Lions 13.6 (84)	MCG (crowd: 32,750)	Report
Sunday, 28 May (3:20 pm)	Carlton 15.6 (96)	def. by	North Melbourne 17.11 (113)	Etihad Stadium (crowd: 32,802)	Report
Sunday, 28 May (2:40 pm)	West Coast 14.6 (90)	def. by	Greater Western Sydney 14.14 (98)	Domain Stadium (crowd: 37,057)	Report
To commemorate the 50th anniversary of the 1967 Australian Aboriginal referendum, and the round named after indigenous player Sir Doug Nicholls, ten indigenous players changed their guernsey numbers to either 50 or 67 for their round 10 matches.

=== Round 11 ===
	Round 11
Thursday, 1 June (7:20 pm)	Port Adelaide 13.20 (98)	def.	Hawthorn 7.5 (47)	Adelaide Oval (crowd: 37,910)	Report
Friday, 2 June (7:50 pm)	Geelong 13.18 (96)	def.	Adelaide 10.14 (74)	Simonds Stadium (crowd: 30,468)	Report
Saturday, 3 June (1:45 pm)	Gold Coast 11.14 (80)	def.	West Coast 11.11 (77)	Metricon Stadium (crowd: 11,402)	Report
Saturday, 3 June (4:35 pm)	Greater Western Sydney 18.9 (117)	def.	Essendon 15.11 (101)	Spotless Stadium (crowd: 13,671)	Report
Saturday, 3 June (7:25 pm)	North Melbourne 9.12 (66)	def. by	Richmond 14.17 (101)	Etihad Stadium (crowd: 36,100)	Report
Sunday, 4 June (2:40 pm)	Fremantle 12.13 (85)	def. by	Collingwood 15.15 (105)	Domain Stadium (crowd: 34,259)	Report
	Bye; Brisbane Lions, Carlton, Melbourne, St Kilda, Sydney, Western Bulldogs
Hawthorn's half time score of 0.3 (3) was the lowest half-time score in the club's history.; Conversely, Port Adelaide's conceded half-time score of 0.3 (3) to Hawthorn was its lowest conceded half-time score in its AFL history.

=== Round 12 ===
	Round 12
Thursday, 8 June (7:20 pm)	Sydney 12.16 (88)	def.	Western Bulldogs 6.6 (42)	SCG (crowd: 20,692)	Report
Friday, 9 June (7:20 pm)	Adelaide 16.15 (111)	def.	St Kilda 7.12 (54)	Adelaide Oval (crowd: 46,082)	Report
Saturday, 10 June (1:45 pm)	Hawthorn 12.7 (79)	def. by	Gold Coast 14.11 (95)	MCG (crowd: 27,392)	Report
Saturday, 10 June (4:35 pm)	Brisbane Lions 18.13 (121)	def.	Fremantle 9.10 (64)	Gabba (crowd: 11,742)	Report
Saturday, 10 June (7:25 pm)	Essendon 19.17 (131)	def.	Port Adelaide 8.13 (61)	Etihad Stadium (crowd: 34,022)	Report
Sunday, 11 June (3:20 pm)	Carlton 10.11 (71)	def.	Greater Western Sydney 9.16 (70)	Etihad Stadium (crowd: 23,194)	Report
Monday, 12 June (3:20 pm)	Melbourne 15.14 (104)	def.	Collingwood 15.10 (100)	MCG (crowd: 70,926)	Report
	Bye; Geelong, North Melbourne, Richmond, West Coast

=== Round 13 ===
	Round 13
Thursday, 15 June (6:10 pm)	West Coast 11.17 (83)	def.	Geelong 10.10 (70)	Domain Stadium (crowd: 35,719)	Report
Friday, 16 June (7:50 pm)	North Melbourne 10.12 (72)	def. by	St Kilda 12.17 (89)	Etihad Stadium (crowd: 26,107)	Report
Saturday, 17 June (1:45 pm)	Richmond 10.11 (71)	def. by	Sydney 12.8 (80)	MCG (crowd: 58,721)	Report
Saturday, 17 June (4:05 pm)	Port Adelaide 18.13 (121)	def.	Brisbane Lions 12.9 (81)	Adelaide Oval (crowd: 31,772)	Report
Saturday, 17 June (7:25 pm)	Gold Coast 11.7 (73)	def. by	Carlton 12.11 (83)	Metricon Stadium (crowd: 11,936)	Report
Sunday, 18 June (3:20 pm)	Western Bulldogs 8.8 (56)	def. by	Melbourne 17.11 (113)	Etihad Stadium (crowd: 33,667)	Report
	Bye; Adelaide, Collingwood, Essendon, Fremantle, Greater Western Sydney, Hawthorn

=== Round 14 ===
	Round 14
Thursday, 22 June (7:20 pm)	Adelaide 12.10 (82)	def. by	Hawthorn 14.12 (96)	Adelaide Oval (crowd: 45,312)	Report
Friday, 23 June (7:50 pm)	Sydney 11.20 (86)	def.	Essendon 12.13 (85)	SCG (crowd: 34,575)	Report
Saturday, 24 June (1:45 pm)	Collingwood 9.8 (62)	def. by	Port Adelaide 13.15 (93)	MCG (crowd: 35,933)	Report
Saturday, 24 June (4:35 pm)	Brisbane Lions 12.14 (86)	def. by	Greater Western Sydney 22.14 (146)	Gabba (crowd: 11,455)	Report
Saturday, 24 June (7:25 pm)	Western Bulldogs 15.17 (107)	def.	North Melbourne 16.10 (106)	Etihad Stadium (crowd: 28,263)	Report
Saturday, 24 June (5:40 pm)	West Coast 14.12 (96)	def. by	Melbourne 15.9 (99)	Domain Stadium (crowd: 36,622)	Report
Sunday, 25 June (1:10 pm)	Geelong 10.14 (74)	def.	Fremantle 11.6 (72)	Simonds Stadium (crowd: 29,928)	Report
Sunday, 25 June (3:20 pm)	Richmond 11.18 (84)	def.	Carlton 8.10 (58)	MCG (crowd: 64,448)	Report
Sunday, 25 June (4:40 pm)	St Kilda 14.20 (104)	def.	Gold Coast 10.12 (72)	Etihad Stadium (crowd: 15,844)	Report
Gary Rohan of Sydney kicked a goal after the final siren to defeat Essendon.; Melbourne won in Western Australia for the first time since round 11, 2004, ending a 17-game losing streak in the state.; For the first time, the AFL itself appealed the ruling of the AFL Tribunal, citing that the two-week suspension meted out to Richmond's Bachar Houli for striking Carlton's Jed Lamb was "manifestly inadequate". Following the appeal, Houli's suspension was increased to four weeks.

=== Round 15 ===
	Round 15
Friday, 30 June (7:50 pm)	Melbourne 7.8 (50)	def. by	Sydney 11.19 (85)	MCG (crowd: 47,464)	Report
Saturday, 1 July (1:45 pm)	Western Bulldogs 11.14 (80)	def. by	West Coast 12.15 (87)	Etihad Stadium (crowd: 29,671)	Report
Saturday, 1 July (2:10 pm)	Carlton 12.5 (77)	def. by	Adelaide 13.11 (89)	MCG (crowd: 33,433)	Report
Saturday, 1 July (4:35 pm)	Gold Coast 18.10 (118)	def.	North Melbourne 14.15 (99)	Metricon Stadium (crowd: 12,779)	Report
Saturday, 1 July (7:25 pm)	Greater Western Sydney 10.8 (68)	drew with	Geelong 10.8 (68)	Spotless Stadium (crowd: 15,007)	Report
Saturday, 1 July (7:10 pm)	Port Adelaide 8.15 (63)	def. by	Richmond 11.10 (76)	Adelaide Oval (crowd: 39,979)	Report
Sunday, 2 July (1:10 pm)	Essendon 11.16 (82)	def. by	Brisbane Lions 13.12 (90)	Etihad Stadium (crowd: 41,246)	Report
Sunday, 2 July (3:20 pm)	Hawthorn 18.10 (118)	def.	Collingwood 14.10 (94)	MCG (crowd: 56,593)	Report
Sunday, 2 July (2:40 pm)	Fremantle 12.8 (80)	def. by	St Kilda 12.17 (89)	Domain Stadium (crowd: 30,541)	Report
Tom Hawkins of Geelong kicked a behind after the final siren to draw the match against Greater Western Sydney.

=== Round 16 ===
	Round 16
Friday, 7 July (7:20 pm)	Adelaide 16.8 (104)	def.	Western Bulldogs 5.15 (45)	Adelaide Oval (crowd: 41,948)	Report
Saturday, 8 July (1:45 pm)	Hawthorn 14.13 (97)	drew with	Greater Western Sydney 15.7 (97)	University of Tasmania Stadium (crowd: 12,156)	Report
Saturday, 8 July (2:10 pm)	Collingwood 12.8 (80)	def. by	Essendon 18.9 (117)	MCG (crowd: 63,537)	Report
Saturday, 8 July (4:35 pm)	Sydney 17.16 (118)	def.	Gold Coast 7.9 (51)	SCG (crowd: 32,987)	Report
Saturday, 8 July (7:25 pm)	Brisbane Lions 11.12 (78)	def. by	Geelong 25.13 (163)	Gabba (crowd: 18,769)	Report
Saturday, 8 July (7:25 pm)	St Kilda 21.12 (138)	def.	Richmond 10.11 (71)	Etihad Stadium (crowd: 47,514)	Report
Sunday, 9 July (1:10 pm)	North Melbourne 12.10 (82)	def. by	Fremantle 13.8 (86)	Etihad Stadium (crowd: 19,267)	Report
Sunday, 9 July (3:20 pm)	Carlton 12.10 (82)	def. by	Melbourne 14.6 (90)	MCG (crowd: 47,266)	Report
Sunday, 9 July (2:40 pm)	West Coast 13.10 (88)	def. by	Port Adelaide 18.12 (120)	Domain Stadium (crowd: 36,766)	Report
Greater Western Sydney drew its second consecutive match; this was the first time since Carlton in rounds 4 and 5 in 1921 that a VFL/AFL team had drawn two consecutive matches.

=== Round 17 ===
	Round 17
Friday, 14 July (7:50 pm)	St Kilda 7.15 (57)	def. by	Essendon 17.16 (118)	Etihad Stadium (crowd: 47,156)	Report
Saturday, 15 July (1:45 pm)	Geelong 13.10 (88)	def.	Hawthorn 12.13 (85)	MCG (crowd: 70,345)	Report
Saturday, 15 July (1:40 pm)	Port Adelaide 19.13 (127)	def.	North Melbourne 8.9 (57)	Adelaide Oval (crowd: 34,138)	Report
Saturday, 15 July (4:35 pm)	Gold Coast 13.10 (88)	def. by	Collingwood 15.13 (103)	Metricon Stadium (crowd: 17,275)	Report
Saturday, 15 July (7:25 pm)	Greater Western Sydney 12.11 (83)	def. by	Sydney 14.12 (96)	Spotless Stadium (crowd: 21,924)	Report
Saturday, 15 July (7:10 pm)	Melbourne 10.10 (70)	def. by	Adelaide 17.14 (116)	TIO Stadium (crowd: 12,104)	Report
Sunday, 16 July (1:10 pm)	Richmond 16.16 (112)	def.	Brisbane Lions 12.9 (81)	Etihad Stadium (crowd: 28,188)	Report
Sunday, 16 July (3:20 pm)	Carlton 9.8 (62)	def. by	Western Bulldogs 12.10 (82)	MCG (crowd: 35,157)	Report
Sunday, 16 July (2:40 pm)	Fremantle 5.14 (44)	def. by	West Coast 11.8 (74)	Domain Stadium (crowd: 38,722)	Report
The attendance of 21,924 is the largest crowd for a sporting event at Spotless Stadium.

=== Round 18 ===
	Round 18
Friday, 21 July (7:20 pm)	Adelaide 13.13 (91)	def.	Geelong 10.10 (70)	Adelaide Oval (crowd: 50,464)	Report
Saturday, 22 July (1:45 pm)	Essendon 20.12 (132)	def.	North Melbourne 16.9 (105)	Etihad Stadium (crowd: 40,359)	Report
Saturday, 22 July (2:10 pm)	Melbourne 13.10 (88)	def.	Port Adelaide 9.11 (65)	MCG (crowd: 27,068)	Report
Saturday, 22 July (4:35 pm)	Western Bulldogs 16.14 (110)	def.	Gold Coast 8.8 (56)	Cazaly's Stadium (crowd: 9,364)	Report
Saturday, 22 July (7:25 pm)	Sydney 14.17 (101)	def.	St Kilda 9.5 (59)	SCG (crowd: 35,773)	Report
Saturday, 22 July (5:40 pm)	Fremantle 7.6 (48)	def. by	Hawthorn 15.10 (100)	Domain Stadium (crowd: 30,818)	Report
Sunday, 23 July (1:10 pm)	Richmond 9.10 (64)	def.	Greater Western Sydney 6.9 (45)	MCG (crowd: 33,467)	Report
Sunday, 23 July (3:20 pm)	Collingwood 13.15 (93)	def.	West Coast 13.7 (85)	Etihad Stadium (crowd: 22,927)	Report
Sunday, 23 July (4:40 pm)	Brisbane Lions 17.10 (112)	def.	Carlton 11.16 (82)	Gabba (crowd: 18,847)	Report

=== Round 19 ===
	Round 19 (Multicultural Round)
Friday, 28 July (7:50 pm)	Hawthorn 10.12 (72)	def.	Sydney 9.12 (66)	MCG (crowd: 52,181)	Report
Saturday, 29 July (1:45 pm)	North Melbourne 11.10 (76)	def.	Melbourne 10.12 (72)	Blundstone Arena (crowd: 13,939)	Report
Saturday, 29 July (2:10 pm)	Greater Western Sydney 13.20 (98)	def.	Fremantle 13.8 (86)	Spotless Stadium (crowd: 11,233)	Report
Saturday, 29 July (4:05 pm)	Port Adelaide 9.9 (63)	def.	St Kilda 8.13 (61)	Adelaide Oval (crowd: 30,335)	Report
Saturday, 29 July (7:25 pm)	Gold Coast 10.5 (65)	def. by	Richmond 14.14 (98)	Metricon Stadium (crowd: 16,207)	Report
Saturday, 29 July (7:25 pm)	Carlton 8.10 (58)	def. by	Geelong 18.15 (123)	Etihad Stadium (crowd: 35,460)	Report
Sunday, 30 July (1:10 pm)	Western Bulldogs 19.13 (127)	def.	Essendon 13.19 (97)	Etihad Stadium (crowd: 48,754)	Report
Sunday, 30 July (3:20 pm)	Collingwood 15.13 (103)	drew with	Adelaide 16.7 (103)	MCG (crowd: 33,269)	Report
Sunday, 30 July (2:40 pm)	West Coast 17.11 (113)	def.	Brisbane Lions 6.9 (45)	Domain Stadium (crowd: 32,652)	Report
Mitch McGovern (Adelaide) kicked a goal after the final siren to draw with Collingwood.; Bizarrely, the first quarter of the Western Bulldogs vs. Essendon match featured only one stoppage: a boundary throw-in.

=== Round 20 ===
	Round 20
Friday, 4 August (7:50 pm)	Geelong 8.13 (61)	def. by	Sydney 16.11 (107)	Simonds Stadium (crowd: 30,833)	Report
Saturday, 5 August (1:45 pm)	Greater Western Sydney 14.13 (97)	def.	Melbourne 10.2 (62)	UNSW Canberra Oval (crowd: 14,274)	Report
Saturday, 5 August (2:10 pm)	Essendon 11.18 (84)	def.	Carlton 11.10 (76)	MCG (crowd: 58,562)	Report
Saturday, 5 August (4:35 pm)	Brisbane Lions 13.11 (89)	def. by	Western Bulldogs 14.19 (103)	Gabba (crowd: 16,148)	Report
Saturday, 5 August (7:25 pm)	North Melbourne 7.15 (57)	def. by	Collingwood 16.15 (111)	Etihad Stadium (crowd: 33,394)	Report
Saturday, 5 August (5:40 pm)	Fremantle 12.18 (90)	def.	Gold Coast 10.7 (67)	Domain Stadium (crowd: 27,050)	Report
Sunday, 6 August (1:10 pm)	St Kilda 15.13 (103)	def.	West Coast 14.11 (95)	Etihad Stadium (crowd: 22,688)	Report
Sunday, 6 August (3:20 pm)	Richmond 13.15 (93)	def.	Hawthorn 9.10 (64)	MCG (crowd: 58,342)	Report
Sunday, 6 August (4:10 pm)	Adelaide 18.22 (130)	def.	Port Adelaide 7.4 (46)	Adelaide Oval (crowd: 45,028)	Report

=== Round 21 ===
	Round 21
Friday, 11 August (7:50 pm)	Western Bulldogs 7.15 (57)	def. by	Greater Western Sydney 16.9 (105)	Etihad Stadium (crowd: 30,672)	Report
Saturday, 12 August (1:45 pm)	Sydney 22.11 (143)	def.	Fremantle 5.9 (39)	SCG (crowd: 39,281)	Report
Saturday, 12 August (2:10 pm)	Geelong 11.14 (80)	def.	Richmond 9.12 (66)	Simonds Stadium (crowd: 32,266)	Report
Saturday, 12 August (4:35 pm)	Brisbane Lions 22.10 (142)	def.	Gold Coast 12.12 (84)	Gabba (crowd: 17,772)	Report
Saturday, 12 August (7:25 pm)	Essendon 12.8 (80)	def. by	Adelaide 18.15 (123)	Etihad Stadium (crowd: 38,487)	Report
Saturday, 12 August (5:40 pm)	West Coast 15.10 (100)	def.	Carlton 12.11 (83)	Domain Stadium (crowd: 30,491)	Report
Sunday, 13 August (1:10 pm)	Melbourne 14.12 (96)	def.	St Kilda 10.12 (72)	MCG (crowd: 53,115)	Report
Sunday, 13 August (3:20 pm)	Hawthorn 18.8 (116)	def.	North Melbourne 14.5 (89)	University of Tasmania Stadium (crowd: 14,509)	Report
Sunday, 13 August (4:10 pm)	Port Adelaide 14.14 (98)	def.	Collingwood 10.11 (71)	Adelaide Oval (crowd: 37,533)	Report

=== Round 22 ===
	Round 22
Friday, 18 August (7:20 pm)	Adelaide 11.14 (80)	def. by	Sydney 13.5 (83)	Adelaide Oval (crowd: 51,466)	Report
Saturday, 19 August (1:45 pm)	Western Bulldogs 11.13 (79)	def. by	Port Adelaide 14.12 (96)	Mars Stadium (crowd: 10,087)	Report
Saturday, 19 August (2:10 pm)	Collingwood 9.5 (59)	def. by	Geelong 10.10 (70)	MCG (crowd: 47,889)	Report
Saturday, 19 August (4:35 pm)	Greater Western Sydney 12.9 (81)	def.	West Coast 9.6 (60)	Spotless Stadium (crowd: 15,751)	Report
Saturday, 19 August (7:25 pm)	Gold Coast 9.3 (57)	def. by	Essendon 12.18 (90)	Metricon Stadium (crowd: 16,817)	Report
Saturday, 19 August (7:25 pm)	Carlton 12.5 (77)	def.	Hawthorn 10.10 (70)	Etihad Stadium (crowd: 35,799)	Report
Sunday, 20 August (1:10 pm)	Melbourne 16.8 (104)	def.	Brisbane Lions 14.7 (91)	MCG (crowd: 30,422)	Report
Sunday, 20 August (3:20 pm)	St Kilda 18.19 (127)	def.	North Melbourne 12.6 (78)	Etihad Stadium (crowd: 29,126)	Report
Sunday, 20 August (2:40 pm)	Fremantle 7.9 (51)	def. by	Richmond 25.5 (155)	Domain Stadium (crowd: 34,204)	Report
Carlton defeated Hawthorn for the first time since round 6, 2005, ending a fourteen-game losing streak.

=== Round 23 ===
	Round 23
Friday, 25 August (7:50 pm)	Hawthorn 15.9 (99)	def.	Western Bulldogs 13.12 (90)	Etihad Stadium (crowd: 48,090)	Report
Saturday, 26 August (1:45 pm)	Collingwood 14.15 (99)	def.	Melbourne 12.11 (83)	MCG (crowd: 51,223)	Report
Saturday, 26 August (2:10 pm)	Brisbane Lions 11.13 (79)	def. by	North Melbourne 19.16 (130)	Gabba (crowd: 15,416)	Report
Saturday, 26 August (4:35 pm)	Sydney 21.12 (138)	def.	Carlton 8.9 (57)	SCG (crowd: 38,965)	Report
Saturday, 26 August (7:25 pm)	Geelong 15.13 (103)	def.	Greater Western Sydney 8.11 (59)	Simonds Stadium (crowd: 30,087)	Report
Saturday, 26 August (7:10 pm)	Port Adelaide 20.15 (135)	def.	Gold Coast 3.2 (20)	Adelaide Oval (crowd: 34,288)	Report
Sunday, 27 August (1:10 pm)	Essendon 16.11 (107)	def.	Fremantle 14.8 (92)	Etihad Stadium (crowd: 42,665)	Report
Sunday, 27 August (3:20 pm)	Richmond 19.8 (122)	def.	St Kilda 12.9 (81)	MCG (crowd: 69,104)	Report
Sunday, 27 August (2:40 pm)	West Coast 15.10 (100)	def.	Adelaide 10.11 (71)	Domain Stadium (crowd: 39,367)	Report
Gold Coast’s final score of 3.2 (20) against Port Adelaide is the lowest score in its club history and the lowest score conceded by Port Adelaide in the AFL.; Gold Coast's final tally of only five scoring shots was the fewest in a game by any team since round 17, 1966.; Gold Coast's score of 3.2 (20) was the lowest in any match since Fremantle scored 1.7 (13) in round 15, 2009.

=== Season notes ===
- Adelaide recorded the longest unbeaten start to a season in club history, winning its first six games.
- Sydney was the first reigning grand finalist in VFL/AFL history to lose its first six matches of the following season, before becoming the first club to reach the finals after starting the season with zero wins and six losses.
- Western Bulldogs became the first team since Hawthorn in 2009 and the first team in the 18-team competition to fail to make the finals after winning the premiership the previous year.
- Essendon became the first team since West Coast in 2011 to qualify for the finals after finishing wooden spooners the previous season.
- West Coast reached the finals at the expense of Melbourne on percentage by 0.48 percentage points, a difference equivalent to only nine on-field points. It is the narrowest margin in VFL/AFL history to decide a finals spot.
- This was the last season in which games were played at Domain Stadium, with the Western Australian teams playing home games at Perth Stadium from 2018 and onwards.
- Adelaide's record of 15 wins, 1 draw and 6 losses is the least successful of any minor premier since 1997.
- Brisbane Lions' record of 5 wins and 17 losses is the most successful of any wooden spooner since the Lions themselves in 1998.
- Richmond had the highest average home-and-away and home game attendance of any club in 2017, with figures of 46,580 and 55,958, respectively.

== Win/loss table ==
Team	1	2	3	4	5	6	7	8	9	10	11	12	13	14	15	16	17	18	19	20	21	22	23	F1	F2	F3	GF	Ladder
Adelaide	**GWS**; **56**	Haw; 24	PA; 17	**Ess**; **65**	GCS; 67	**Rich**; **76**	NM; 59	**Melb**; **41**	BL; 80	**Frem**; **100**	Geel; 22	**StK**; **57**	X	**Haw**; **14**	Carl; 12	**WB**; **59**	Melb; 46	**Geel**; **21**	Coll; 0	**PA**; **84**	Ess; 43	**Syd**; **3**	WCE; 29	**GWS**; **36**	X	**Geel**; **61**	**Rich**; **48**	**1**
Brisbane Lions	GCS; 2	**Ess**; **27**	StK; 31	**Rich**; **52**	WB; 32	**PA**; **83**	Syd; 54	Haw; 38	**Adel**; **80**	Coll; 45	X	**Frem**; **57**	PA; 40	**GWS**; **60**	Ess; 8	**Geel**; **85**	Rich; 31	**Carl**; **30**	WCE; 68	**WB**; **14**	**GCS**; **58**	Melb; 13	**NM**; **51**	X	X	X	X	18
Carlton	**Rich**; **43**	Melb; 22	**Ess**; **15**	**GCS**; **26**	PA; 90	**Syd**; **19**	Coll; 23	StK; 19	Frem; 35	**NM**; **17**	X	**GWS**; **1**	GCS; 10	Rich; 26	**Adel**; **12**	**Melb**; **8**	**WB**; **20**	BL; 30	**Geel**; **65**	Ess; 8	WCE; 17	**Haw**; **7**	Syd; 81	X	X	X	X	16
Collingwood	**WB**; **14**	Rich; 19	Syd; 1	**StK**; **14**	Ess; 18	Geel; 29	**Carl**; **23**	GWS; 3	**Haw**; **18**	**BL**; **45**	Frem; 20	Melb; 4	X	**PA**; **31**	Haw; 24	**Ess**; **37**	GCS; 15	**WCE**; **8**	**Adel**; **0**	NM; 54	PA; 27	**Geel**; **11**	**Melb**; **16**	X	X	X	X	13
Essendon	**Haw**; **25**	BL; 27	Carl; 15	Adel; 65	**Coll**; **18**	**Melb**; **38**	Frem; 37	**Geel**; **17**	**WCE**; **61**	Rich; 15	GWS; 16	**PA**; **70**	X	Syd; 1	**BL**; **8**	Coll; 37	StK; 61	**NM**; **27**	WB; 30	**Carl**; **8**	**Adel**; **43**	GCS; 33	**Frem**; **15**	Syd; 65	X	X	X	**7**
Fremantle	**Geel**; **42**	PA; 89	**WB**; **16**	Melb; 2	**NM**; **5**	WCE; 41	**Ess**; **37**	Rich; 2	**Carl**; **35**	Adel; 100	**Coll**; **20**	BL; 57	X	Geel; 2	**StK**; **9**	NM; 4	**WCE**; **30**	**Haw**; **52**	GWS; 12	**GCS**; **23**	Syd; 104	**Rich**; **104**	Ess; 15	X	X	X	X	14
Geelong	Frem; 42	**NM**; **1**	**Melb**; **29**	Haw; 86	StK; 38	**Coll**; **29**	GCS; 25	Ess; 17	**WB**; **23**	**PA**; **2**	**Adel**; **22**	X	WCE; 13	**Frem**; **2**	GWS; 0	BL; 85	**Haw**; **3**	Adel; 21	Carl; 65	**Syd**; **46**	**Rich**; **14**	Coll; 11	**GWS**; **44**	**Rich**; **51**	**Syd**; **59**	Adel; 61	X	**2**
Gold Coast	**BL**; **2**	GWS; 102	**Haw**; **86**	Carl; 26	**Adel**; **67**	NM; 13	**Geel**; **25**	**PA**; **72**	X	Melb; 35	**WCE**; **3**	Haw; 16	**Carl**; **10**	StK; 32	**NM**; **19**	Syd; 67	**Coll**; **15**	WB; 54	**Rich**; **33**	Frem; 23	BL; 58	**Ess**; **33**	PA; 115	X	X	X	X	17
Greater Western Sydney	Adel; 56	**GCS**; **102**	NM; 42	**PA**; **31**	Syd; 42	**WB**; **2**	StK; 23	**Coll**; **3**	**Rich**; **3**	WCE; 8	**Ess**; **16**	Carl; 1	X	BL; 60	**Geel**; **0**	Haw; 0	**Syd**; **13**	Rich; 19	**Frem**; **12**	**Melb**; **35**	WB; 48	**WCE**; **21**	Geel; 44	Adel; 36	**WCE**; **67**	Rich; 36	X	**4**
Hawthorn	Ess; 25	**Adel**; **24**	GCS; 86	**Geel**; **86**	**WCE**; **51**	**StK**; **75**	Melb; 3	**BL**; **38**	Coll; 18	Syd; 6	PA; 51	**GCS**; **16**	X	Adel; 14	**Coll**; **24**	**GWS**; **0**	Geel; 3	Frem; 52	**Syd**; **6**	Rich; 29	**NM**; **27**	Carl; 7	**WB**; **9**	X	X	X	X	12
Melbourne	StK; 30	**Carl**; **22**	Geel; 29	**Frem**; **2**	Rich; 13	Ess; 38	**Haw**; **3**	Adel; 41	**NM**; **14**	**GCS**; **35**	X	**Coll**; **4**	WB; 57	WCE; 3	**Syd**; **35**	Carl; 8	**Adel**; **46**	**PA**; **23**	NM; 4	GWS; 35	**StK**; **24**	**BL**; **13**	Coll; 16	X	X	X	X	9
North Melbourne	**WCE**; **43**	Geel; 1	**GWS**; **42**	**WB**; **3**	Frem; 5	**GCS**; **13**	**Adel**; **59**	**Syd**; **42**	Melb; 14	Carl; 17	**Rich**; **35**	X	**StK**; **17**	WB; 1	GCS; 19	**Frem**; **4**	PA; 70	Ess; 27	**Melb**; **4**	**Coll**; **54**	Haw; 27	StK; 49	BL; 51	X	X	X	X	15
Port Adelaide	Syd; 28	**Frem**; **89**	**Adel**; **17**	GWS; 31	**Carl**; **90**	BL; 83	**WCE**; **10**	GCS; 72	X	Geel; 2	**Haw**; **51**	Ess; 70	**BL**; **40**	Coll; 31	**Rich**; **13**	WCE; 32	**NM**; **70**	Melb; 23	**StK**; **2**	Adel; 84	**Coll**; **27**	WB; 17	**GCS**; **115**	**WCE**; **2**	X	X	X	**5**
Richmond	Carl; 43	**Coll**; **19**	**WCE**; **11**	BL; 52	**Melb**; **13**	Adel; 76	WB; 5	**Frem**; **2**	GWS; 3	**Ess**; **15**	NM; 35	X	**Syd**; **9**	**Carl**; **26**	PA; 13	StK; 67	**BL**; **31**	**GWS**; **19**	GCS; 33	**Haw**; **29**	Geel; 14	Frem; 104	**StK**; **41**	Gee; 51	X	**GWS**; **36**	Adel; 48	**3**
St Kilda	**Melb**; **30**	WCE; 19	**BL**; **31**	Coll; 14	**Geel**; **38**	Haw; 75	**GWS**; **23**	**Carl**; **19**	**Syd**; **50**	WB; 40	X	Adel; 57	NM; 17	**GCS**; **32**	Frem; 9	**Rich**; **67**	**Ess**; **61**	Syd; 42	PA; 2	**WCE**; **8**	Melb; 24	**NM**; **49**	Rich; 41	X	X	X	X	11
Sydney	**PA**; **28**	WB; 23	**Coll**; **1**	WCE; 26	**GWS**; **42**	Carl; 19	**BL**; **54**	NM; 42	StK; 50	**Haw**; **6**	X	**WB**; **46**	Rich; 9	**Ess**; **1**	Melb; 35	**GCS**; **67**	GWS; 13	**StK**; **42**	Haw; 6	Geel; 46	**Frem**; **104**	Adel; 3	**Carl**; **81**	**Ess**; **65**	Geel; 59	X	X	**6**
West Coast	NM; 43	**StK**; **19**	Rich; 11	**Syd**; **26**	Haw; 51	**Frem**; **41**	PA; 10	**WB**; **8**	Ess; 61	**GWS**; **8**	GCS; 3	X	**Geel**; **13**	**Melb**; **3**	WB; 7	**PA**; **32**	Frem; 30	Coll; 8	**BL**; **68**	StK; 8	**Carl**; **17**	GWS; 21	**Adel**; **29**	PA; 2	GWS; 67	X	X	**8**
Western Bulldogs	Coll; 14	**Syd**; **23**	Frem; 16	NM; 3	**BL**; **32**	GWS; 2	**Rich**; **5**	WCE; 8	Geel; 23	**StK**; **40**	X	Syd; 46	**Melb**; **57**	**NM**; **1**	**WCE**; **7**	Adel; 59	Carl; 20	**GCS**; **54**	**Ess**; **30**	BL; 14	**GWS**; **48**	**PA**; **17**	Haw; 9	X	X	X	X	10
Team	1	2	3	4	5	6	7	8	9	10	11	12	13	14	15	16	17	18	19	20	21	22	23	F1	F2	F3	GF	Ladder

+	Win	Qualified for finals
−	Loss	Eliminated

Bold – Home game
X – Bye
Opponent for round listed above margin

== Ladder ==
Pos	Team	Pld	W	L	D	PF	PA	PP	Pts	Qualification
1	Adelaide	22	15	6	1	2415	1776	136.0	62	2017 finals
2	Geelong	22	15	6	1	2134	1818	117.4	62	2017 finals
3	Richmond (P)	22	15	7	0	1992	1684	118.3	60	2017 finals
4	Greater Western Sydney	22	14	6	2	2081	1812	114.8	60	2017 finals
5	Port Adelaide	22	14	8	0	2168	1671	129.7	56	2017 finals
6	Sydney	22	14	8	0	2093	1651	126.8	56	2017 finals
7	Essendon	22	12	10	0	2135	2004	106.5	48	2017 finals
8	West Coast	22	12	10	0	1964	1858	105.7	48	2017 finals
9	Melbourne	22	12	10	0	2035	1934	105.2	48	
10	Western Bulldogs	22	11	11	0	1857	1913	97.1	44	
11	St Kilda	22	11	11	0	1925	1986	96.9	44	
12	Hawthorn	22	10	11	1	1864	2055	90.7	42	
13	Collingwood	22	9	12	1	1944	1963	99.0	38	
14	Fremantle	22	8	14	0	1607	2160	74.4	32	
15	North Melbourne	22	6	16	0	1983	2264	87.6	24	
16	Carlton	22	6	16	0	1594	2038	78.2	24	
17	Gold Coast	22	6	16	0	1756	2311	76.0	24	
18	Brisbane Lions	22	5	17	0	1877	2526	74.3	20	

Source: AFL
Rules for classification: 1) points; 2) percentage; 3) number of points for.
(P) Premiers

=== Ladder progression ===
- Numbers highlighted in green indicates the team finished the round inside the top eight.
- Numbers highlighted in blue indicates the team finished in first place on the ladder in that round.
- Numbers highlighted in red indicates the team finished in last place on the ladder in that round.
- Underlined numbers indicates the team had a bye during that round.
- Subscript numbers indicate ladder position at rounds end.

	Team	1	2	3	4	5	6	7	8	9	10	11	12	13	14	15	16	17	18	19	20	21	22	23
1	Adelaide	4_{1}	8_{2}	12_{1}	16_{2}	20_{1}	24_{1}	24_{1}	24_{1}	28_{1}	32_{1}	32_{2}	36_{1}	36_{1}	36_{2}	40_{2}	44_{1}	48_{1}	52_{1}	54_{1}	58_{1}	62_{1}	62_{1}	62_{1}
2	Geelong	4_{2}	8_{7}	12_{3}	16_{1}	20_{2}	20_{3}	20_{3}	20_{5}	24_{3}	28_{3}	32_{3}	32_{3}	32_{3}	36_{3}	38_{3}	42_{3}	46_{2}	46_{2}	50_{2}	50_{4}	54_{3}	58_{3}	62_{2}
3	Richmond	4_{3}	8_{3}	12_{2}	16_{3}	20_{3}	20_{4}	20_{6}	20_{7}	20_{7}	24_{5}	28_{4}	28_{4}	28_{6}	32_{6}	36_{4}	36_{6}	40_{5}	44_{4}	48_{4}	52_{3}	52_{4}	56_{4}	60_{3}
4	Greater Western Sydney	0_{18}	4_{9}	8_{5}	12_{4}	16_{4}	20_{2}	20_{2}	24_{2}	28_{2}	32_{2}	36_{1}	36_{2}	36_{2}	40_{1}	42_{1}	44_{2}	44_{3}	44_{3}	48_{3}	52_{2}	56_{2}	60_{2}	60_{4}
5	Port Adelaide	4_{5}	8_{1}	8_{4}	8_{7}	12_{6}	16_{5}	16_{7}	20_{4}	20_{6}	20_{8}	24_{5}	24_{5}	28_{4}	32_{4}	32_{5}	36_{4}	40_{4}	40_{5}	44_{5}	44_{5}	48_{6}	52_{5}	56_{5}
6	Sydney	0_{14}	0_{15}	0_{16}	0_{16}	0_{18}	0_{18}	4_{17}	8_{15}	12_{12}	12_{15}	12_{16}	16_{14}	20_{12}	24_{10}	28_{9}	32_{8}	36_{6}	40_{6}	40_{6}	44_{6}	48_{5}	52_{6}	56_{6}
7	Essendon	4_{7}	8_{6}	8_{7}	8_{11}	12_{8}	12_{10}	12_{12}	16_{11}	20_{10}	20_{11}	20_{12}	24_{7}	24_{8}	24_{11}	24_{11}	28_{10}	32_{10}	36_{8}	36_{10}	40_{8}	40_{10}	44_{8}	48_{7}
8	West Coast	4_{4}	8_{5}	8_{6}	12_{5}	12_{7}	16_{6}	20_{4}	24_{3}	24_{4}	24_{6}	24_{7}	24_{9}	28_{7}	28_{7}	32_{7}	32_{9}	36_{8}	36_{9}	40_{8}	40_{9}	44_{8}	44_{9}	48_{8}
9	Melbourne	4_{6}	8_{4}	8_{8}	8_{8}	8_{10}	12_{8}	12_{10}	16_{10}	16_{11}	20_{9}	20_{9}	24_{6}	28_{5}	32_{5}	32_{6}	36_{5}	36_{7}	40_{7}	40_{7}	40_{10}	44_{7}	48_{7}	48_{9}
10	Western Bulldogs	4_{8}	8_{8}	8_{9}	12_{6}	16_{5}	16_{7}	20_{5}	20_{8}	20_{8}	24_{4}	24_{6}	24_{8}	24_{9}	28_{9}	28_{10}	28_{11}	32_{11}	36_{10}	40_{9}	44_{7}	44_{9}	44_{11}	44_{10}
11	St Kilda	0_{13}	0_{13}	4_{10}	8_{10}	8_{11}	12_{9}	16_{8}	20_{6}	20_{9}	20_{10}	20_{11}	20_{12}	24_{10}	28_{8}	32_{8}	36_{7}	36_{9}	36_{11}	36_{11}	40_{11}	40_{11}	44_{10}	44_{11}
12	Hawthorn	0_{12}	0_{14}	0_{18}	0_{18}	4_{15}	4_{17}	8_{16}	12_{14}	12_{17}	16_{14}	16_{15}	16_{17}	16_{17}	20_{16}	24_{13}	26_{13}	26_{13}	30_{12}	34_{12}	34_{13}	38_{12}	38_{12}	42_{12}
13	Collingwood	0_{11}	0_{11}	4_{12}	4_{13}	4_{13}	8_{12}	8_{15}	8_{17}	12_{13}	16_{12}	20_{10}	20_{11}	20_{13}	20_{13}	20_{15}	20_{15}	24_{14}	28_{13}	30_{13}	34_{12}	34_{12}	34_{13}	38_{13}
14	Fremantle	0_{17}	0_{18}	4_{15}	8_{12}	12_{9}	12_{11}	16_{9}	20_{9}	24_{5}	24_{7}	24_{8}	24_{10}	24_{11}	24_{12}	24_{14}	28_{12}	28_{12}	28_{14}	28_{14}	32_{14}	32_{14}	32_{14}	32_{14}
15	North Melbourne	0_{15}	0_{12}	0_{17}	0_{17}	0_{17}	4_{15}	8_{14}	8_{16}	12_{14}	16_{13}	16_{13}	16_{15}	16_{16}	16_{17}	16_{17}	16_{17}	16_{17}	16_{17}	20_{16}	20_{16}	20_{16}	20_{17}	24_{15}
16	Carlton	0_{16}	0_{16}	4_{14}	4_{14}	4_{16}	8_{14}	12_{13}	12_{13}	12_{16}	12_{17}	12_{17}	16_{16}	20_{15}	20_{15}	20_{16}	20_{16}	20_{16}	20_{16}	20_{17}	20_{17}	20_{17}	24_{15}	24_{16}
17	Gold Coast	0_{10}	0_{17}	4_{11}	8_{9}	8_{12}	8_{13}	12_{11}	12_{12}	12_{15}	12_{16}	16_{14}	20_{13}	20_{14}	20_{14}	24_{12}	24_{14}	24_{15}	24_{15}	24_{15}	24_{15}	24_{15}	24_{16}	24_{17}
18	Brisbane Lions	4_{9}	4_{10}	4_{13}	4_{15}	4_{14}	4_{16}	4_{18}	4_{18}	4_{18}	4_{18}	4_{18}	8_{18}	8_{18}	8_{18}	12_{18}	12_{18}	12_{18}	16_{18}	16_{18}	16_{18}	20_{18}	20_{18}	20_{18}

=== Positions of teams round by round ===
View source data.

== Finals series ==
Qualifying and elimination finals
7 Sep, Adelaide Oval
1	Adelaide	12.12 (84)
4	Greater Western Sydney	6.12 (48)
9 Sep, Adelaide Oval
5	Port Adelaide	10.16 (76) (a.e.t.)
8	West Coast	12.6 (78) (a.e.t.)
9 Sep, SCG
6	Sydney	19.7 (121)
7	Essendon	8.8 (56)
8 Sep, MCG
2	Geelong	5.10 (40)
3	Richmond	13.13 (91)

Semi-finals
16 Sep, Spotless Stadium
Greater Western Sydney	19.11 (125)
West Coast	9.4 (58)
15 Sep, MCG
Geelong	15.8 (98)
Sydney	5.9 (39)

Preliminary finals
22 Sep, Adelaide Oval
Adelaide	21.10 (136)
Geelong	10.15 (75)
23 Sep, MCG
Richmond	15.13 (103)
Greater Western Sydney	9.13 (67)

Grand final
30 Sep, MCG
Adelaide	8.12 (60)
Richmond	16.12 (108)

=== Week one ===
	Qualifying finals
QF1: Thursday, 7 September (7:20 pm)	Adelaide 12.12 (84)	def.	Greater Western Sydney 6.12 (48)	Adelaide Oval (crowd: 52,805)	Report
QF2: Friday, 8 September (7:50 pm)	Geelong 5.10 (40)	def. by	Richmond 13.13 (91)	MCG (crowd: 95,028)	Report

	Elimination finals
EF2: Saturday, 9 September (4:20 pm)	Sydney 19.7 (121)	def.	Essendon 8.8 (56)	SCG (crowd: 46,323)	Report
EF1: Saturday, 9 September (7:20 pm)	Port Adelaide 10.16 (76)^{(ET)}	def. by	West Coast 12.6 (78)^{(ET)}	Adelaide Oval (crowd: 41,172)	Report
Richmond won its first final since 2001, ending the longest active winless streak in finals.; Richmond had its first win against Geelong since round 9, 2006 ending a 13-match losing streak and its first win against Geelong at the MCG since round 12, 1999.; The crowd of 95,028 for the final between Geelong and Richmond is the highest attendance for a final in week 1 of the finals VFL/AFL history.; The crowd of 46,323 is the largest crowd for an AFL game at the SCG.; At the end of regular time in the Port Adelaide vs West Coast game, scores were tied at 8.12 (60) to 9.6 (60). Extra time was played to determine the winner, with Luke Shuey kicking a goal after the final siren in the second half of extra time to win the match. It was only the third time in VFL/AFL history a final was decided by extra time.

=== Week two ===
	Semi finals
SF2: Friday, 15 September (7:50 pm)	Geelong 15.8 (98)	def.	Sydney 5.9 (39)	MCG (crowd: 55,529)	Report
SF1: Saturday, 16 September (7:25 pm)	Greater Western Sydney 19.11 (125)	def.	West Coast 9.4 (58)	Spotless Stadium (crowd: 14,865)	Report
The crowd of 14,865 between Greater Western Sydney and West Coast was the lowest crowd for a final since the 1916 semi-final.

=== Week three ===
	Preliminary finals
PF1: Friday, 22 September (7:20 pm)	Adelaide 21.10 (136)	def.	Geelong 10.15 (75)	Adelaide Oval (crowd: 53,817)	Report
PF2: Saturday, 23 September (4:45 pm)	Richmond 15.13 (103)	def.	Greater Western Sydney 9.13 (67)	MCG (crowd: 94,258)	Report
The crowd of 94,258 was the largest crowd Greater Western Sydney had played in front of at the time until they played Richmond again in the 2019 AFL Grand Final.

=== Week four ===
	Grand final
Saturday, 30 September (2:30 pm)	Adelaide 8.12 (60)	def. by	Richmond 16.12 (108)	MCG (crowd: 100,021)	Report
For only the second time in AFL/VFL history – the first time since the inaugural grand final in 1898 – every player was playing in his first grand final.; Richmond won its first grand final since 1980, breaking a 37 year premiership drought. In fact, Richmond became the first team since Geelong in 2007 to win a premiership after missing the finals the previous year.; The crowd of 100,021 was the largest crowd for an Adelaide game.; The crowd of 100,021 was the biggest grand final crowd since Hawthorn vs Carlton in the 1986 VFL Grand Final.

== Attendances ==
=== By club ===
2017 AFL attendances
Club	Total	Games	Avg. per game	Home total	Home games	Home avg.
Adelaide	1,034,578	25	41,240	513,151	11	46,650
Brisbane Lions	481,838	22	21,902	181,007	11	16,455
Carlton	873,618	22	39,710	421,916	11	38,356
Collingwood	1,003,991	22	45,636	514,963	11	46,815
Essendon	1,066,080	23	46,351	558,935	11	50,812
Fremantle	690,906	22	31,405	356,122	11	32,375
Geelong	995,602	25	39,824	386,218	11	35,111
Gold Coast	368,482	22	16,749	150,292	11	13,663
Greater Western Sydney	593,903	25	23,756	145,152	11	13,196
Hawthorn	866,536	22	39,388	365,822	11	33,257
Melbourne	833,190	22	37,872	392,638	11	35,694
North Melbourne	554,306	22	25,196	249,460	11	22,678
Port Adelaide	740,549	23	32,198	419,494	11	38,136
Richmond	1,314,058	25	52,562	615,542	11	55,958
St Kilda	760,222	22	34,556	344,510	11	31,319
Sydney	896,761	24	37,365	367,376	11	33,398
West Coast	769,709	24	30,618	404,258	11	36,751
Western Bulldogs	729,431	22	33,156	346,206	11	31,473

=== By ground ===
2017 ground attendances
Ground	Total	Games	Avg. per game
Adelaide Oval	1,080,439	25	43,218
Blundstone Arena	32,761	3	10,920
Cazaly's Stadium	9,364	1	9,364
Domain Stadium	760,380	22	34,563
Etihad Stadium	1,513,914	46	32,911
Gabba	181,007	11	16,455
Jiangwan Stadium	10,118	1	10,118
Mars Stadium	10,087	1	10,087
MCG	2,696,189	50	53,924
Metricon Stadium	140,174	10	14,017
SCG	413,699	12	34,475
Simonds Stadium	208,766	7	29,824
Spotless Stadium	122,510	9	13,612
TIO Stadium	12,104	1	12,104
TIO Traeger Park	5,072	1	5,072
University of Tasmania Stadium	52,789	4	13,197
UNSW Canberra Oval	37,507	3	12,502

== Awards ==
- The Brownlow Medal was awarded to Dustin Martin of Richmond, who polled a record 36 votes.
- The Coleman Medal was awarded to Lance Franklin of Sydney, who kicked 69 goals during the home and away season. It was the fourth time Franklin has won the award. Franklin kicked ten goals in the final round to move above Josh Kennedy.
- The Ron Evans Medal was awarded to Andrew McGrath of Essendon, who received 51 votes.
- The AFL Goal of the Year was awarded to Daniel Rioli of Richmond for his goal against West Coast in round 3.
- The AFL Mark of the Year was awarded to Joe Daniher of Essendon for his mark against St Kilda in round 17.
- The McClelland Trophy was awarded to Adelaide for the first time since 2005.
- The wooden spoon was "awarded" to the Brisbane Lions for the first time since 1998 after obtaining five wins during the season.
- The AFL Players Association Awards
  - The Leigh Matthews Trophy was awarded to Dustin Martin of Richmond, polling 1,333 votes ahead of Patrick Dangerfield, who polled 776.
  - The Robert Rose Award was awarded to Rory Sloane of Adelaide.
  - The best captain was awarded to Taylor Walker of Adelaide for the second year in a row.
  - The best first-year player was awarded to Andrew McGrath of Essendon.
  - The 22under22 team captaincy was awarded to Marcus Bontempelli of the Western Bulldogs for the second year in a row.
- The AFL Coaches Association Awards
  - The AFL Coaches Association Player of the Year Award was awarded to Dustin Martin of Richmond who received 122 votes ahead of Patrick Dangerfield who received 118.
  - The Gary Ayres Award for the best player in the finals series was awarded to Dustin Martin of Richmond who polled 25 votes ahead of teammate Trent Cotchin on 15.
  - The Allan Jeans Senior Coach of the Year Award was awarded to Richmond coach Damien Hardwick.
  - The Assistant Coach of the Year Award was awarded to Sydney assistant Rhyce Shaw.
  - The Lifetime Achievement Award was awarded to John Dimmer, whose coaching career (spanning 284 games) included two flags apiece with West Australian clubs West Perth and South Fremantle.
  - The Best Young Player Award was awarded to Clayton Oliver of Melbourne, who received 72 votes.
  - The Media Award was awarded to Gerard Whateley for the fourth consecutive year.
- The Jim Stynes Community Leadership Award was awarded to Jack Hombsch of Port Adelaide.

=== Milestones ===
Name	Club	Milestone	Round	Ref.
Travis Boak	Port Adelaide	200 AFL games	Round 1	
Brent Stanton	Essendon	250 AFL games	Round 2	
Danyle Pearce	Fremantle	250 AFL games	Round 2	
Lance Franklin	Sydney	250 AFL games	Round 3	
Steve Johnson	Greater Western Sydney	500 AFL goals	Round 3	
Travis Cloke	Western Bulldogs	250 AFL games	Round 4	
Lindsay Thomas	North Melbourne	200 AFL games	Round 4	
Bob Murphy	Western Bulldogs	300 AFL games	Round 5	
Richard Douglas	Adelaide	200 AFL games	Round 5	
Lance Franklin	Sydney	800 AFL goals	Round 5	
Jarryd Roughead	Hawthorn	500 AFL goals	Round 5	
Nick Riewoldt	St Kilda	700 AFL goals	Round 6	
Aaron Sandilands	Fremantle	250 AFL games	Round 6	
Eddie Betts	Adelaide	500 AFL goals	Round 7	
Jack Riewoldt	Richmond	500 AFL goals	Round 7	
James Kelly	Essendon	300 AFL games	Round 8	
Bernie Vince	Melbourne	200 AFL games	Round 8	
Ross Lyon	Fremantle	250 AFL games coached	Round 10	
Brad Ebert	Port Adelaide	200 AFL games	Round 11	
Tom Hawkins	Geelong	200 AFL games	Round 11	
Brendon Goddard	Essendon	300 AFL games	Round 11	
Paddy Ryder	Port Adelaide	200 AFL games	Round 14	
Heath Shaw	Greater Western Sydney	250 AFL games	Round 14	
Gary Ablett Jr.	Gold Coast	300 AFL games	Round 15	
Scott Pendlebury	Collingwood	250 AFL games	Round 15	
Tom Lonergan	Geelong	200 AFL games	Round 16	
Luke Hodge	Hawthorn	300 AFL games	Round 17	
Daniel Wells	Collingwood	250 AFL games	Round 17	
Mathew Nicholls	Umpire	300 AFL games umpired	Round 18	
Alastair Clarkson	Hawthorn	300 AFL games coached	Round 18	
Josh Kennedy	West Coast	200 AFL games	Round 18	
Josh Kennedy	Sydney	200 AFL games	Round 19	
Shane Edwards	Richmond	200 AFL games	Round 19	
Josh Kennedy	West Coast	500 AFL goals	Round 20	
Jarryd Roughead	Hawthorn	250 AFL games	Round 20	
Matt Rosa	Gold Coast	200 AFL games	Round 21	
Jarrod Harbrow	Gold Coast	200 AFL games	Round 21	
Scott Thompson	North Melbourne	200 AFL games	Round 23	
Patrick Dangerfield	Geelong	200 AFL games	Finals week 1	
Jarrad McVeigh	Sydney	300 AFL games	Finals week 2	
Brett Deledio	Greater Western Sydney	250 AFL games	Finals week 3	

=== Coleman Medal ===
- Numbers highlighted in blue indicates the player led the Coleman Medal at the end of that round.
- Numbers underlined indicates the player did not play in that round.

	Player	1	2	3	4	5	6	7	8	9	10	11	12	13	14	15	16	17	18	19	20	21	22	23	Total
1	Lance Franklin	4_{4}	4_{8}	0_{8}	2_{10}	3_{13}	1_{14}	8_{22}	1_{23}	4_{27}	5_{32}	0_{32}	3_{35}	1_{36}	0_{36}	4_{40}	3_{43}	4_{47}	3_{50}	1_{51}	1_{52}	4_{56}	3_{59}	10_{69}	69
2	Josh Kennedy	7_{7}	4_{11}	2_{13}	2_{15}	1_{16}	6_{22}	2_{24}	3_{27}	4_{31}	3_{34}	0_{34}	0_{34}	0_{34}	0_{34}	0_{34}	0_{34}	3_{37}	6_{43}	6_{49}	5_{54}	6_{60}	4_{64}	1_{65}	65
3	Ben Brown	2_{2}	3_{5}	1_{6}	4_{10}	1_{11}	6_{17}	2_{19}	2_{21}	5_{26}	1_{27}	1_{28}	0_{28}	1_{29}	2_{31}	3_{34}	4_{38}	3_{41}	6_{47}	4_{51}	0_{51}	3_{54}	2_{56}	7_{63}	63
4	Joe Daniher	3_{3}	3_{6}	1_{7}	2_{9}	3_{12}	1_{13}	3_{16}	5_{21}	5_{26}	3_{29}	1_{30}	4_{34}	0_{34}	1_{35}	3_{38}	3_{41}	4_{45}	2_{47}	6_{53}	3_{56}	3_{59}	1_{60}	2_{62}	62
5	Jack Riewoldt	1_{1}	2_{3}	1_{4}	4_{8}	6_{14}	2_{16}	4_{20}	3_{23}	2_{25}	2_{27}	2_{29}	0_{29}	2_{31}	3_{34}	1_{35}	1_{36}	4_{40}	2_{42}	0_{42}	0_{42}	1_{43}	4_{47}	3_{50}	50
6	Taylor Walker	0_{0}	2_{2}	4_{6}	5_{11}	2_{13}	5_{18}	1_{19}	2_{21}	3_{24}	1_{25}	3_{28}	3_{31}	0_{31}	2_{33}	1_{34}	3_{37}	4_{41}	1_{42}	1_{43}	3_{46}	2_{48}	1_{49}	0_{49}	49
6	Eddie Betts	4_{4}	3_{7}	3_{10}	6_{16}	3_{19}	1_{20}	3_{23}	2_{25}	3_{28}	3_{31}	1_{32}	2_{34}	0_{34}	1_{35}	2_{37}	2_{39}	2_{41}	0_{41}	0_{41}	4_{45}	0_{45}	2_{47}	2_{49}	49
8	Tom Hawkins	3_{3}	4_{7}	5_{12}	4_{16}	2_{18}	1_{19}	3_{22}	4_{26}	1_{27}	1_{28}	2_{30}	0_{30}	0_{30}	1_{31}	1_{32}	4_{36}	0_{36}	1_{37}	6_{43}	3_{46}	0_{46}	0_{46}	2_{48}	48
9	Robbie Gray	0_{0}	6_{6}	2_{8}	1_{9}	5_{14}	4_{18}	0_{18}	2_{20}	0_{20}	3_{23}	1_{24}	3_{27}	2_{29}	5_{34}	1_{35}	3_{38}	2_{40}	0_{40}	1_{41}	1_{42}	2_{44}	2_{46}	1_{47}	47
10	Charlie Dixon	2_{2}	4_{6}	1_{7}	1_{8}	2_{10}	4_{14}	3_{17}	2_{19}	0_{19}	1_{20}	4_{24}	0_{24}	1_{25}	1_{26}	1_{27}	5_{32}	1_{33}	1_{34}	1_{35}	2_{37}	1_{38}	4_{42}	4_{46}	46

=== Best and fairest ===
Club	Award name	Player	Ref.
Adelaide	Malcolm Blight Medal	Matt Crouch	
Brisbane Lions	Merrett–Murray Medal	Dayne Zorko	
Carlton	John Nicholls Medal	Marc Murphy	
Collingwood	Copeland Trophy	Steele Sidebottom	
Essendon	W. S. Crichton Medal	Joe Daniher	
Fremantle	Doig Medal	Bradley Hill	
Geelong	Carji Greeves Medal	Patrick Dangerfield	
Gold Coast	Club Champion	Gary Ablett	
Greater Western Sydney	Kevin Sheedy Medal	Josh Kelly	
Hawthorn	Peter Crimmins Medal	Tom Mitchell	
Melbourne	Keith 'Bluey' Truscott Trophy	Clayton Oliver	
North Melbourne	Syd Barker Medal	Shaun Higgins	
Port Adelaide	John Cahill Medal	Paddy Ryder	
Richmond	Jack Dyer Medal	Dustin Martin	
St Kilda	Trevor Barker Award	Sebastian Ross	
Sydney	Bob Skilton Medal	Luke Parker	
West Coast	John Worsfold Medal	Elliot Yeo	
Western Bulldogs	Charles Sutton Medal	Marcus Bontempelli	

== Club leadership ==
Club	Coach	Captain(s)	Vice-captain(s)	Leadership group	Ref
Adelaide	Don Pyke	Taylor Walker	Rory Sloane	Eddie Betts, Tom Lynch, Daniel Talia, Scott Thompson	
Brisbane Lions	Chris Fagan	Dayne Beams	Tom Rockliff, Dayne Zorko (deputy)	Harris Andrews, Allen Christensen, Ryan Lester, Stefan Martin	
Carlton	Brendon Bolton	Marc Murphy	Kade Simpson	Dennis Armfield, Patrick Cripps, Ed Curnow, Sam Docherty, Bryce Gibbs	
Collingwood	Nathan Buckley	Scott Pendlebury	Taylor Adams, Steele Sidebottom, Jeremy Howe		
Essendon	John Worsfold	Dyson Heppell	Cale Hooker, Zach Merrett	Joe Daniher, Brendon Goddard, Michael Hurley, Jobe Watson	
Fremantle	Ross Lyon	Nat Fyfe		David Mundy, Lachie Neale, Aaron Sandilands, Lee Spurr, Michael Walters	
Geelong	Chris Scott	Joel Selwood	Patrick Dangerfield, Harry Taylor	Mark Blicavs, Mitch Duncan, Cameron Guthrie, Tom Hawkins, Scott Selwood	
Gold Coast	Rodney Eade (Rounds 1–20); Dean Solomon (Rounds 21–23)	Tom Lynch; Steven May		Michael Barlow, Touk Miller, Michael Rischitelli, Matt Rosa, David Swallow	
Greater Western Sydney	Leon Cameron	Phil Davis; Callan Ward	Stephen Coniglio	Josh Kelly, Heath Shaw, Dylan Shiel, Devon Smith	
Hawthorn	Alastair Clarkson	Jarryd Roughead	Liam Shiels, Isaac Smith	Josh Gibson, Jack Gunston, Luke Hodge, Ben Stratton	
Melbourne	Simon Goodwin	Nathan Jones; Jack Viney		Max Gawn, Jordan Lewis, Tom McDonald, Bernie Vince	
North Melbourne	Brad Scott	Jack Ziebell	Robbie Tarrant	Shaun Higgins, Jamie Macmillan, Andrew Swallow	
Port Adelaide	Ken Hinkley	Travis Boak	Ollie Wines	Brad Ebert, Hamish Hartlett, Tom Jonas	
Richmond	Damien Hardwick	Trent Cotchin	Jack Riewoldt, Alex Rance		
St Kilda	Alan Richardson	Jarryn Geary		David Armitage, Josh Bruce, Jack Newnes, Dylan Roberton, Sebastian Ross, Jack Steven, Maverick Weller	
Sydney	John Longmire	Josh Kennedy	Dan Hannebery, Luke Parker, Dane Rampe	Heath Grundy, Kieren Jack, Jarrad McVeigh, Nick Smith	
West Coast	Adam Simpson	Shannon Hurn	Josh Kennedy, Luke Shuey	Andrew Gaff, Jeremy McGovern, Sam Mitchell, Matt Priddis	
Western Bulldogs	Luke Beveridge	Bob Murphy	Easton Wood	Matthew Boyd, Marcus Bontempelli, Dale Morris	

== Coach changes ==
Coach	Club	Date	Notes	Caretaker	New coach
Rodney Eade	Gold Coast	8 August 2017	Contract wasn't renewed beyond 2017 and resigned immediately following continued poor on-field performances in 2017.	Dean Solomon	Stuart Dew

== Club membership ==
2017 AFL membership figures
Club	Members	Change from 2016	% change from 2016
Adelaide	56,865	▲2,558	▲4.71%
Brisbane Lions	21,362	▼1,924	▼8.26%
Carlton	50,326	▲196	▲0.39%
Collingwood	75,879	▲1,236	▲1.66%
Essendon	67,768	▲10,274	▲17.87%
Fremantle	51,254	▼635	▼1.22%
Geelong	54,854	▲4,283	▲8.47%
Gold Coast	11,665	▼1,189	▼9.25%
Greater Western Sydney	20,944	▲5,632	▲36.78%
Hawthorn	75,663	▲312	▲0.41%
Melbourne	42,233	▲3,087	▲7.89%
North Melbourne	40,343	▼4,671	▼10.38%
Port Adelaide	52,129	▼1,614	▼3.00%
Richmond	72,669	▲391	▲0.54%
St Kilda	42,052	▲4,043	▲10.64%
Sydney	58,838	▲2,315	▲4.10%
West Coast	65,064	▼124	▼0.19%
Western Bulldogs	47,653	▲8,194	▲20.77%
Total	907,561	▲32,364	▲3.70%

== Post-season ==
=== International Rules Series ===
The International Rules Series returned in November 2017, with Australia hosting two test matches. The series was played on an aggregate-points basis, with the winner being the team that scores the highest amount over the two test matches. The matches were played on 12 and 18 November 2017 at Adelaide Oval and Domain Stadium. The Australian team was again composed exclusively of players who have won All-Australian honours in their careers. The times and venues for the series were announced in August.

	2017 International Rules Series
Sunday, 12 November (3:30 pm)	Australia 2.13.12 (63)	def.	Ireland 1.13.8 (53)	Adelaide Oval (crowd: 25,502)	Report
Saturday, 18 November (4:45 pm)	Australia 0.15.8 (53)	def.	Ireland 2.10.8 (50)	Domain Stadium (crowd: 30,116)	Report
Australia won the series 2-0 and by an aggregate score of 116-103
