= Sebastian Ross =

Australian rules footballer (born 1993)

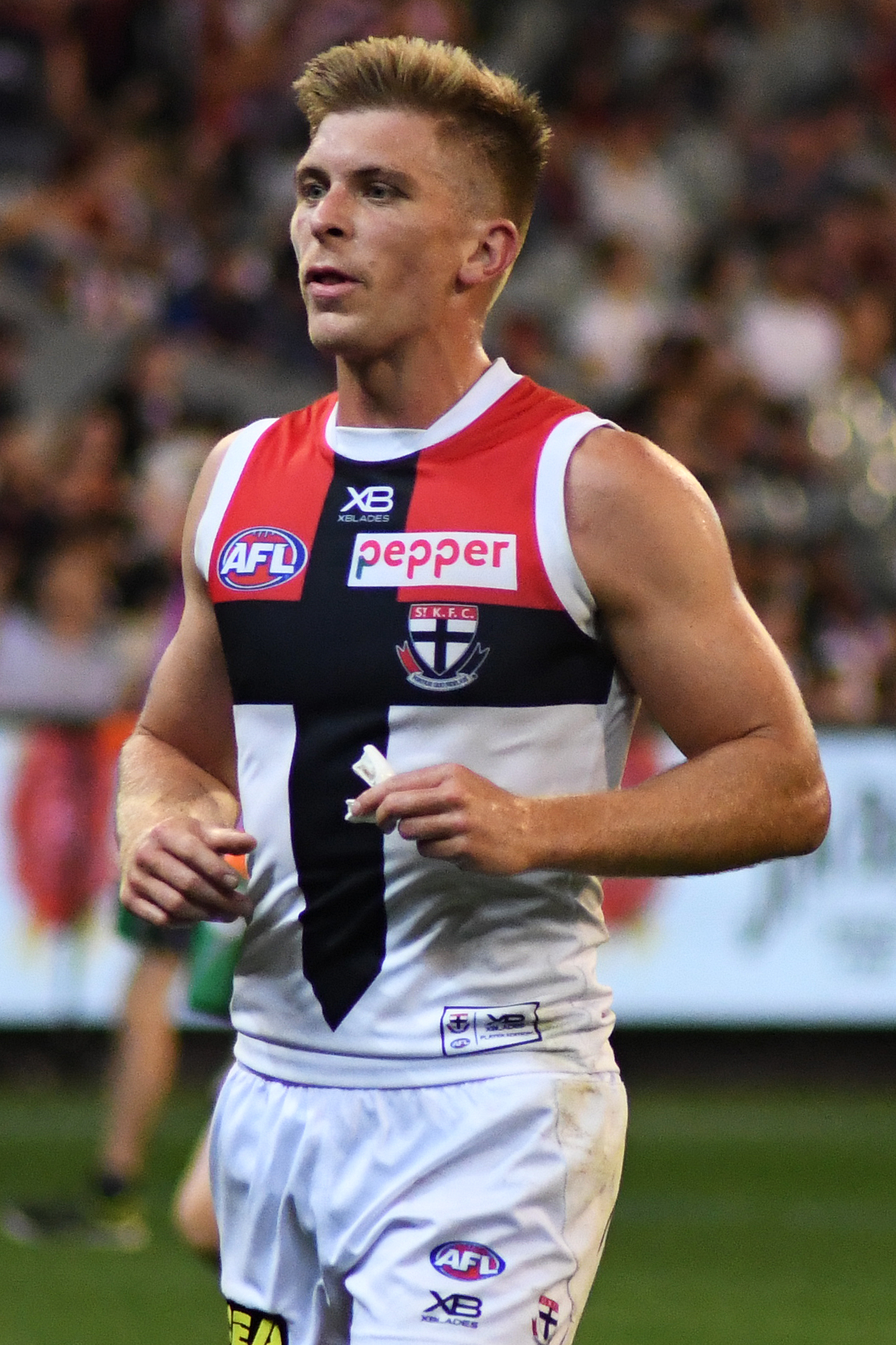
- Ross playing for St Kilda in 2019

Personal information
- Full name: Sebastian Ross
- Nickname: Seb
- Born: 7 May 1993 (age 33)
- Original team: North Ballarat Rebels (TAC Cup)
- Draft: No. 25, 2011 national draft
- Debut: Round 22, 2012, St Kilda vs. Greater Western Sydney, at Etihad Stadium
- Height: 187 cm (6 ft 2 in)
- Weight: 86 kg (190 lb)
- Position: Midfielder

Playing career
Years	Club	Games (Goals)
2012–2024	St Kilda	211 (36)

Career highlights
- 2× Trevor Barker Award: 2017, 2019; Ian Stewart Medal: 2016

Sebastian Ross (born 7 May 1993) is a former professional Australian rules footballer who played for the St Kilda Football Club in the Australian Football League (AFL). Ross is a dual Trevor Barker Award winner and won the Ian Stewart Medal in 2016.

== Family ==
Ross is the cousin of Jobe Watson and nephew of Tim Watson.

== AFL career ==
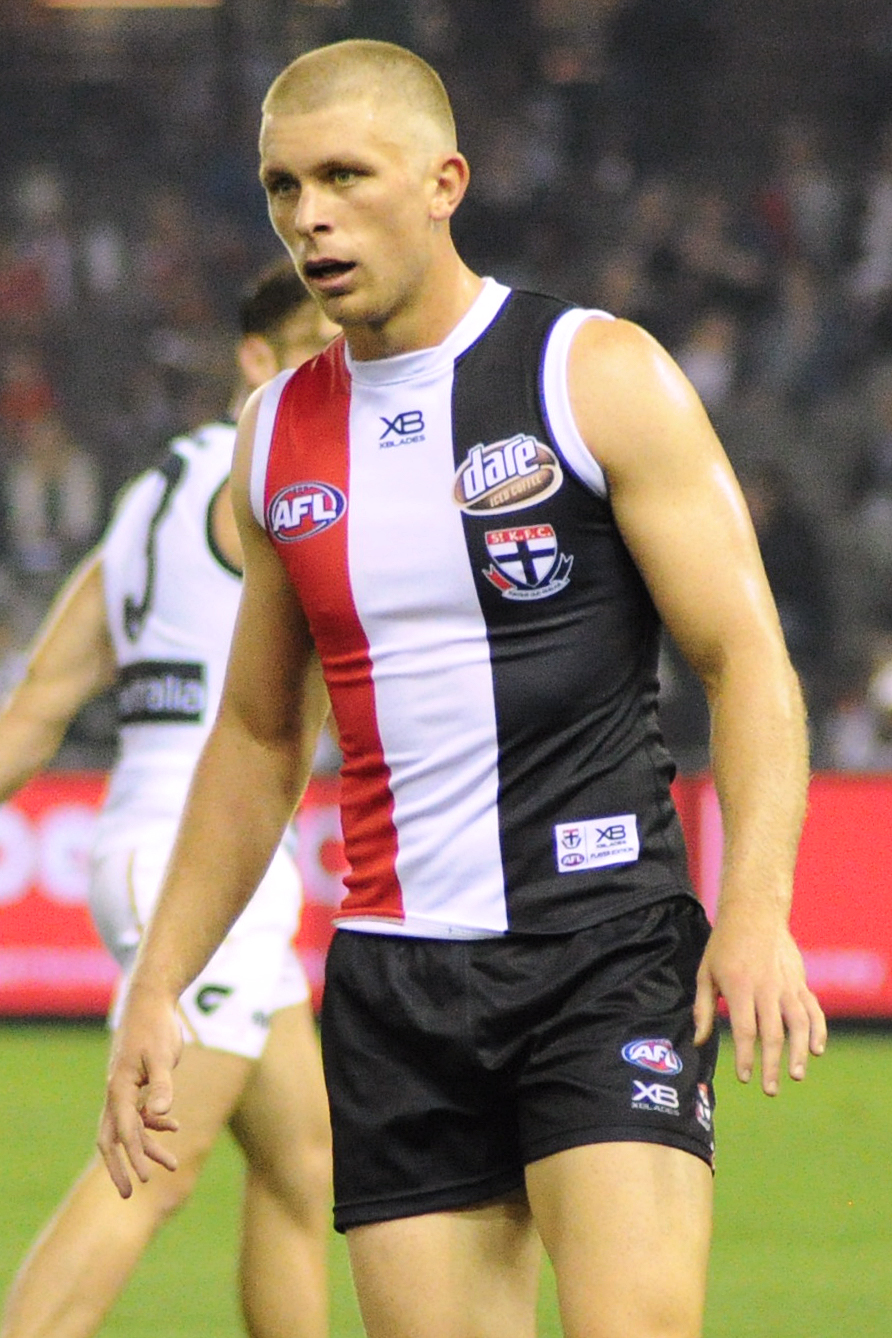
Ross playing for St Kilda in 2018

Ross was recruited by the club with draft pick 25 in the 2011 national draft. He made his debut in round 22 of the 2012 season against Greater Western Sydney at Docklands Stadium.

Ross was one of the league's most consistent midfielders between 2016 and 2019, averaging at least 26 disposals per game each year. In 2016, Ross received the Ian Stewart Medal for best on ground in the Saints' round 22 victory over Richmond. In 2017 and 2019 he won the Trevor Barker Award for St Kilda's best and fairest, and was selected in the All-Australian 40-man squad in 2017.

After 13 games in 2024, Ross was delisted by St Kilda, and he announced his intentions to continue his AFL career at another club.

== Statistics ==
Legend
G	Goals	K	Kicks	D	Disposals	T	Tackles
B	Behinds	H	Handballs	M	Marks

Season	Team	No.	Games	Totals							Averages (per game)							Votes
Season	Team	No.	Games	G	B	K	H	D	M	T	G	B	K	H	D	M	T	Votes
2012	St Kilda	6	1	0	0	5	3	8	0	4	0.0	0.0	5.0	3.0	8.0	0.0	4.0	0
2013	St Kilda	6	13	3	1	72	125	197	35	42	0.2	0.1	5.5	9.6	15.2	2.7	3.2	0
2014	St Kilda	6	13	1	2	112	94	206	35	43	0.1	0.2	8.6	7.2	15.8	2.7	3.3	0
2015	St Kilda	6	10	1	3	93	89	182	26	41	0.1	0.3	9.3	8.9	18.2	2.6	4.1	0
2016	St Kilda	6	22	3	5	299	283	582	95	96	0.1	0.2	13.6	12.9	26.5	4.3	4.4	10
2017	St Kilda	6	22	5	9	318	339	657	79	94	0.2	0.4	14.5	15.4	29.9	3.6	4.3	14
2018	St Kilda	6	21	3	8	337	295	632	114	83	0.1	0.4	16.0	14.0	30.1	5.4	4.0	6
2019	St Kilda	6	22	6	7	323	249	572	84	90	0.3	0.3	14.7	11.3	26.0	3.8	4.1	12
2020 (Note: The 2020 season was played with 17 home-and-away matches per team (down from 22) and 16-minute quarters with time on (down from 20-minute quarters with time on) due to the impact of the COVID-19 pandemic.)	St Kilda	6	16	2	2	146	141	287	29	44	0.1	0.1	9.1	8.8	17.9	1.8	2.8	1
2021	St Kilda	6	20	5	8	225	195	420	91	61	0.3	0.4	11.3	9.8	21.0	4.6	3.1	0
2022	St Kilda	6	21	3	3	294	247	541	91	71	0.1	0.1	14.0	11.8	25.8	4.3	3.4	1
2023	St Kilda	6	17	1	1	190	137	327	42	61	0.1	0.1	11.2	8.1	19.2	2.5	3.6	0
2024	St Kilda	6	13	3	3	123	92	215	38	52	0.2	0.2	9.5	7.1	16.5	2.9	4.0	4
2025	St Kilda	6	0	—	—	—	—	—	—	—	—	—	—	—	—	—	—	0
Career			211	36	52	2537	2289	4826	759	782	0.2	0.2	12.0	10.8	22.9	3.6	3.7	48
