= Roy Fountain =

Australian rules footballer

Personal information
- Full name: Walter Roy Fountain
- Born: 16 February 1915
- Died: 13 April 1995 (aged 80)
- Original team: Moorabbin
- Height: 188 cm (6 ft 2 in)
- Weight: 96 kg (212 lb)

Playing career^{1}
Years	Club	Games (Goals)
1938–1943, 1946–1947	St Kilda	70 (44)
- ^{1} Playing statistics correct to the end of 1947.

Walter Roy Fountain (16 February 1915 – 13 April 1995) was an Australian rules footballer who played with St Kilda in the Victorian Football League (VFL). Fountain played as a ruckman and was St Kilda's best and fairest winner in 1939.
