= Jack Davis (Australian footballer) =

Australian rules footballer

Personal information
- Born: 16 July 1908
- Died: 11 August 1991 (aged 83)
- Original team: Trinity Grammar
- Height: 189 cm (6 ft 2 in)
- Weight: 84 kg (185 lb)

Playing career^{1}
Years	Club	Games (Goals)
1930–1938	St Kilda	150 (31)
- ^{1} Playing statistics correct to the end of 1938.

Career highlights
- 3rd in the Brownlow Medal: 1933; 5th in the Brownlow Medal: 1935; Best and Fairest: 1934, 1935, 1937; 10 time Victorian representative; Recorder Cup and V. F. A. Medal 1940

Jack Davis (16 July 1908 – 11 August 1991) was an Australian rules footballer who played with St Kilda in the VFL during the 1930s.

A key position defender, Davis finished in the top 10 of the Brownlow Medal count four times, including third placing in 1933 and equal fifth in 1935. He was a regular Victorian interstate representative and won St Kilda's best and fairest award in the 1934, 1935 and 1937 seasons. In 1939 he went to Brighton in the Victorian Football Association as playing coach, and in 1940, his final season, he won the Recorder Cup and V. F. A. Medal as best and fairest in the Association.
