= Jim Ross (Australian footballer) =

Australian rules footballer, born 1927

- Ross during his St Kilda career

Personal information
- Full name: James Allan Ross
- Born: 18 October 1927
- Died: 18 September 2015 (aged 87); Launceston, Tasmania
- Original team: Ringwood, Victoria
- Height: 183 cm (6 ft 0 in)
- Weight: 79.5 kg (175 lb)

Playing career^{1}
Years	Club	Games (Goals)
1946–1954	St Kilda	139 (171)
- ^{1} Playing statistics correct to the end of 1954.

Career highlights
- St Kilda Best and Fairest 1949, 1951–1952; St Kilda Leading goalkicker 1954; St Kilda Team of the Century member; Victorian state representative four times

James Allan Ross (18 October 1927 – 18 September 2015) was an Australian rules footballer in the VFL. He was a star ruckman and centre half-forward.

Ross won three club Best and Fairest awards. He left St Kilda and coached in Tasmania when only 26 years old, winning All-Australian selection in 1958.

He was a member of St Kilda's Team of the Century, and he was the fifth Tasmanian inducted into St Kilda's Hall of Fame. During his career at St Kilda, he represented Victoria four times.

Ross died at the Launceston General Hospital in Launceston, Tasmania, on 18 September 2015.
