= Wels Eicke =

Australian rules footballer (1893–1980)

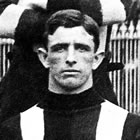

Personal information
- Full name: Wellesley Hastings Eicke
- Born: 27 September 1893; Prahran, Victoria
- Died: 10 February 1980 (aged 86); Prahran

Playing career^{1}
Years	Club	Games (Goals)
1909–1924	St Kilda	194 (56)
1925–1926	North Melbourne	21 (0)
1926	St Kilda	3 (5)
Total		218 (61)

Representative team honours
Years	Team	Games (Goals)
	Victoria	8

Coaching career^{3}
Years	Club	Games (W–L–D)
1919–1924	St Kilda	32 (11–21–0)
1925–1926	North Melbourne	20 (5–15–0)
Total		52 (16–36–0)
- ^{1} Playing statistics correct to the end of 1926.^{3} Coaching statistics correct as of 1926.

Career highlights
- St Kilda best and fairest 1914–1915, 1919; St Kilda captain 1919

Wellesley Hastings "Wels" Eicke (27 September 1893 – 10 February 1980) was an Australian rules footballer in the Victorian Football League (VFL).

== Early life and career ==
Eicke was the younger son of George Augustus Eicke (died 28 March 1927) of St. Kilda, Victoria, and Jessie Forrester, eldest daughter of Thomas Thompson of Acheron, Victoria, grazier.

He was a talented young sportsman who was a champion swimmer at school level. In 1909, Eicke debuted with St Kilda at 15 years and 315 days old – becoming one of only six VFL/AFL footballers to have played at 15.

He married 11 March 1916 at Holy Trinity Church, Balaclava, to Alberta Maude, only daughter of A. E. Woodland of Caulfield, Victoria.

As of December 2022, Eicke holds the record for playing with the most teammates (at 299).

== Football career ==
Eicke began his career playing as a rover, but became known as one of the VFL's greatest defenders. He was a fine kick, an expert place kick, and a great mark, despite being only 5 foot 9 inches (1.75 metres) tall.

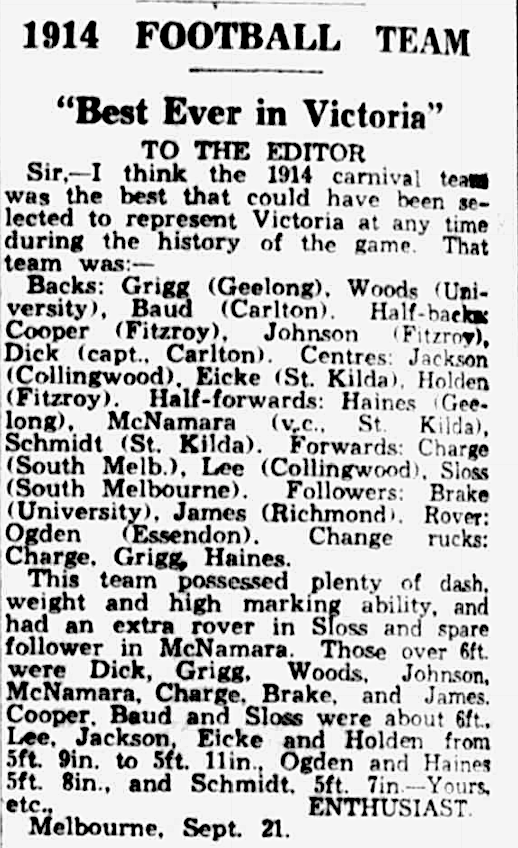
Enthusiast's Letter to the Editor The Herald, 21 Sept. 1934.

=== St Kilda (VFL) ===
Eicke won the inaugural St. Kilda Best and Fairest in 1914, and he went on to win it another two times. He was captain-coach of St. Kilda in 1919 and 1924. In Round 12, 1924, Eicke was notably the first of only three captains in league history to have called for a headcount; the teams were even.

=== North Melbourne (VFL) ===
In 1925, he captained-coached North Melbourne in their first year in the VFL. The following year he resigned from that position citing business reasons but he would continue to play for them. After one additional game Eicke requested a clearance back to St. Kilda.

=== St Kilda ===
Having played in four of the 1926 season's first five matches for North Melbourne, he was cleared back to St Kilda, where he played another three games.

=== Prahran (VFA) ===
He was cleared from St Kilda to play with Prahran in May 1929. Eicke soon realised that at the age of 36 the game had past him so he retired.

=== Brighton (VFA) ===
Eicke was the coach of St. Kilda's 2nd XVIII in 1933, and then he was appointed coach of Brighton in 1934 and 1935.

== St Kilda Football Club ==
Eicke was later a committeeman of the St Kilda Football Club. He resigned from the committee in 1964, due to his opposition to the club's move from the St Kilda Cricket Ground to Moorabbin Oval.

== Death and posthumous honours ==
Eicke died in 1980 at the age of 86 in Prahran, Victoria. He was one of the inaugural inductees into the Australian Football Hall of Fame in 1996. He was also inducted into the St Kilda Hall of Fame in 2007.

== See also ==
- 1914 Sydney Carnival
