= 50-metre penalty =

In the sport of Australian rules football, the 50-metre penalty is an additional penalty applied by umpires for an infraction after a free kick or mark has already been paid.

The 50-metre penalty is used in many senior competitions, including the Australian Football League. The laws of the game also allow leagues to use a 25-metre penalty in place of a 50-metre penalty; examples of leagues which do this include the South Australian National Football League (SANFL), Victorian Amateur Football Association (VAFA), Australian Football International Cup and the Australian Amateur Football Council. The generic term distance penalty may also be used for the penalty.

== Rules ==
When the umpire pays a 50-metre penalty, he calls time-off, measures out approximately fifty metres from the spot of the mark by running in a straight line towards the goals, and setting the new mark; if the player is already within 50 metres of goal, the mark becomes the exact centre of the goal line.

Players are given a short period of time to follow the play down the field before the clock is restarted. The player can play on at any time while the umpire is measuring out the 50-metre penalty.

50-metre penalties are primarily used to deal with time-wasting or unsportsmanlike conduct after a mark or free kick is awarded. Specific infractions which can result in a 50-metre penalty include:

- Arguing with, disputing the decision of, or using abusive language towards an umpire.
- Scragging the player who has taken a mark; that is, to tackle the player or impede him from taking the kick as quickly as he would like.
- Failing to return the ball quickly and on the full to a player who has been awarded a free kick.
- Wasting time, deliberately or inadvertently, by kicking the ball forward after one's team has conceded a free kick.
- Using unnecessary roughness against a player who has already taken a mark.
- Running over the mark; the man standing on the mark cannot move forward, and must respond if called to recede by the umpire.
- Running through the mark; other defensive players who are not standing on the mark may not run across the imaginary line between the man standing the mark and the man taking the kick, unless following his direct opponent.
- Entering the protected zone; defensive players may not impede an opponent by entering or remaining within the corridor of space extending ten metres either side of the imaginary line between the man standing the mark and the man taking the kick, and extending backwards, unless following his direct opponent.
- Impeding a player while he is advancing the ball as part of measuring out a previous 50-metre penalty.

More generally, if any free kick is paid against the defensive team while a mark or free kick is being taken, the umpire will either pay the free kick to the violated player at the spot of the foul, or award a 50-metre penalty to the player with the ball, depending upon which penalty brings the attacking team closer to goal.

There are also two types of in-play infringement for which a 50-metre penalty is automatically applied on top of the initial free kick. These are:

- A free kick for illegally holding or impeding an opponent after that opponent disposed of the ball in a manner which prevents that opponent from participating in the "next act of play"; for example by preventing a player from receiving a handball while running into open space.
- Any free kick resulting from an interchange infringement or head count.

Otherwise, a 50-metre penalty can only be applied to an infringement which is separate to the initial mark or free kick.

== History ==
The fifteen-yard penalty was the first distance penalty introduced at senior level by the Victorian Football Association in 1939, as one of the rules included in its rival code of Australian rules football. The rule was introduced to give the umpire a means of penalising a player who cribbed over the mark or wasted time on the mark; under standard rules at the time, such infractions could only be policed by reports. The Australian National Football Council introduced the rule into the national rules during 1954 (leagues began using it in 1955), which was applied to both time-wasting and to crude, late challenges on the player with the mark. The length was increased to 50 metres in 1988 when it was determined that the fifteen metre penalty had become insufficient to deter time-wasting and scragging.

Questions over how punitive the rule when the infraction is minor is have led to discussions over whether a 25-meter penalty should be introduced. Former AFL coaches Kevin Sheedy and Leigh Matthews backed the implementation of a 25-metre penalty; Matthews suggested having both penalty options available to the umpires depending on the severity of the infraction, although he conceded that offering both options would make it harder for umpires as well as potentially tempt players to test the threshold.

== Rationale ==
Fifty metres is the average length of a long kick. As 50-metre penalties are awarded only to players who have already taken a mark or been awarded a free kick, the penalty is the equivalent of having made a long pass downfield (with the playing area being over 150 metres long). This interpretation allows the fifty metre length to be adjusted to appropriate values for lower age groups.

In most cases, a player must already have a free kick or a mark to receive a 50-metre penalty. Often, crowds will call for "fifty!" when they see a player hurt behind play or in a marking contest, although unless the mark is taken, fifty metres can never be awarded. There was an exception to this rule made in 2000, when a 50-metre penalty would automatically be awarded against any player who was reported for a non-wrestling offence; so unpopular was the change that it was repealed after seventeen rounds.

Some observers of AFL Women's football regard the 50-metre penalty as too harsh for the women's game, since it amounts to almost two average length kicks, and since goals from 50-metre penalties have a greater impact on the result of a women's game due to its much lower scores than the men's game. In the 2020 AFLW season up to round four, 5.6% of the league's goals kicked came from 50-metre penalties, compared with only 2.7% per cent of goals in the 2019 AFL men's season.

== Notable distance penalties ==
=== AFL ===
- The most famous 15-metre penalty occurred in the 1987 preliminary final, in an incident where Melbourne's Jim Stynes ran across the mark against Hawthorn. Gary Buckenara, needing a 55-metre goal after the final siren for Hawthorn to steal the victory, was brought 15 metres closer to goal. Buckenara converted the goal, advancing Hawthorn to the Grand Final.
- In 2005, an incident where Essendon's Mark Johnson called an opposition player from Sydney a "weak dog" when he wouldn't get up and was playing for a free kick was rewarded with a 50-metre penalty to the Sydney player. It was also believed Johnson engaged in abusive language with the umpire, which may have influenced the decision.
- During the St Kilda vs Fremantle "Sirengate" match in Round 5, 2006, St Kilda full-forward Fraser Gehrig abused and argued with the umpire, gave up five consecutive free kicks: a free kick in defensive goal square, three consecutive 50-metre penalties (spanning the entire length of the field, yielding a certain goal to Fremantle) and an additional free kick to Fremantle after the goal.
- In Round 1, 2007, umpire Stuart Wenn awarded a short fifty-metre penalty against Collingwood's Heath Shaw after a mark by the Kangaroos' Shannon Grant with three minutes remaining on the game. Wenn positioned Shaw approximately on the kick-off line when he should have been on the goal line. Grant missed the 15-metre set shot, and the Kangaroos lost the game by three points.
- In Round 11, 2009, triple 50-metre penalties occurred when Sydney Swans' Barry Hall put his arm around the neck of Hawthorn's Jarryd Roughead, who ended up in his own goal square. Hall was benched beside his coach, and Sydney lost the match by eleven points.
- In Round 15, 2017, late in the match between Fremantle and St Kilda at Domain Stadium, St Kilda forward Tim Membrey took a mark inside 50, and then teammate Nick Riewoldt asked for the ball back from Fremantle's Griffin Logue, fooling the latter into thinking that it was Riewoldt who took the mark. Logue gave away a 50-metre penalty for time-wasting, and then Membrey kicked the goal to give the Saints a nine-point win.
- In Round 5, 2022, a controversial 50m penalty was awarded in the fourth quarter when Lions defender Harris Andrews gave away a 50m penalty while standing on the mark as Collingwood's Darcy Moore prepared to take a set shot. Andrews was left perplexed as to why he'd been penalised, with the umpire, Andrew Stephens, indicating that it was because he'd extended his arms in a demonstrative manner.

=== AFL Women's ===
- In Round 4, 2020, during the AFL Women's match between St Kilda and Fremantle, a 50-metre penalty was awarded against St Kilda player Molly McDonald with less than two minutes remaining in the game. Fremantle player Kate Flood kicked a goal from inside the goal square to level the scores in a very low-scoring game. Fremantle went on to win by one point: 3.6 (24) to St Kilda's 3.5 (23). The ball was kicked out on-the-full at the 50-metre line by a St Kilda player. McDonald left the ball on the ground instead of returning it to the Fremantle player. This was deemed to be an untimely lapse in concentration by the St Kilda player and almost certainly affected the result of the game.
- In Round 7, 2022, a 50-metre penalty was awarded against St Kilda's Kate Shierlaw for an off-the-ball incident that was initially not picked up by the television commentators, who believed that it went against Bianca Jakobsson for knocking the ball out of Greater Western Sydney player Katherine Smith's hands after she had taken a mark outside the Giants' 50-metre forward arc with ten seconds remaining in the match. The penalty brought Smith to within less than 20 metres from goal, and she would kick the match-winning goal, becoming the first player in AFL Women's history to kick a goal after the siren as a result of the 50-metre penalty. It gave her side a two-point win.

== See also ==
- Laws of Australian rules football
- Penalty (rugby union): a similar rule exists in rugby union, where the mark is moved forward 10 metres if the defending team do not retreat sufficiently far after a tapped penalty or free kick, or if dissent is shown to the referee.
