= List of St Kilda Football Club records and statistics =

St Kilda Football Club is a club from Melbourne, Australia.

== AFL home-and-away seasons ==
The St Kilda Football Club has fared relatively well since the league became known as the AFL prior to the start of the 1990 premiership season (formerly the VFL, whose first season was 1897, a season in which St Kilda participated and finished 8th out of 8 with no wins). The team have made the finals series eleven times. St Kilda finished second in both 1997 and 2009 after qualifying for the finals series in first position and winning the minor premierships. They were eliminated in preliminary finals in 2004, 2005 and 2008.

Despite not winning any premierships in the AFL era, the club has played in 5 Pre-Season Cup finals, winning 3 (1996, 2004, 2008) and losing two (1998, 2010).

| Year | Finished | Home & Away Season | Games | Won | Lost | Drawn | Percentage | Points | Membership |
|---|---|---|---|---|---|---|---|---|---|
| 1990 | 9th | 9 | 22 | 9 | 13 | 0 | 100.65 | 36 | 11,363 |
| **1991** | **5th** | **4** | **22** | **14** | **7** | **1** | **120.36** | **58** | 9,765 |
| **1992** | **4th** | **6** | **22** | **14** | **8** | **0** | **120.21** | **56** | 11,650 |
| 1993 | 12th | 12 | 20 | 10 | 10 | 0 | 94.18 | 40 | 12,956 |
| 1994 | 13th | 13 | 22 | 7 | 14 | 1 | 74.91 | 30 | 12,009 |
| 1995 | 14th | 14 | 22 | 9 | 13 | 0 | 100.65 | 36 | 8,870 |
| 1996 | 10th | 10 | 22 | 10 | 12 | 0 | 100.98 | 40 | 14,375 |
| 1997 | **2nd** | **Minor Premiers** | **22** | **15** | **7** | **0** | **119.60** | **60** | 16,610 |
| 1998 | **6th** | **6** | **22** | **13** | **9** | **0** | **102.09** | **52** | 23,204 |
| 1999 | 10th | 10 | 22 | 10 | 12 | 0 | 97.87 | 40 | 20,793 |
| 2000 | 16th | 16th | 22 | 2 | 19 | 1 | 70.51 | 10 | 17,855 |
| 2001 | 15th | 15 | 22 | 4 | 18 | 0 | 72.56 | 16 | 22,248 |
| 2002 | 15th | 15 | 22 | 5 | 16 | 1 | 78.60 | 22 | 17,696 |
| 2003 | 11th | 11 | 22 | 11 | 11 | 0 | 85.79 | 44 | 23,626 |
| **2004** | **3rd** | **3** | **22** | **16** | **6** | **0** | **127.97** | **64** | 30,534 |
| **2005** | **3rd** | **4** | **22** | **14** | **8** | **0** | **133.28** | **56** | 32,043 |
| **2006** | **7th** | **6** | **22** | **14** | **8** | **0** | **118.38** | **56** | 32,327 |
| 2007 | 9th | 9 | 22 | 11 | 10 | 1 | 96.55 | 46 | 30,394 |
| **2008** | **4th** | **4** | **22** | **13** | **9** | **0** | **110.56** | **52** | 30,063 |
| **2009** | **2nd** | **Minor Premiers** | **22** | **20** | **2** | **0** | **155.71** | **80** | 31,906 |
| **2010** | **2nd** | **3** | **22** | **15** | **6** | **1** | **121.62** | **62** | 39,201 |
| **2011** | **7th** | **6** | **22** | **12** | **9** | **1** | **112.8** | **50** | 39,276 |
| 2012 | 9th | 9 | 22 | 12 | 10 | 0 | 123.33 | 48 | 35,440 |
| 2013 | 16th | 16 | 22 | 5 | 17 | 0 | 82.59 | 20 | |
| 2014 | 18th | 18 | 22 | 4 | 18 | 0 | 60.8 | 16 | |
| 2015 | 14th | 14 | 22 | 6 | 15 | 1 | 78.4 | 26 | |
| 2016 | 9th | 9 | 22 | 12 | 10 | 0 | 95.7 | 48 | |
| **Record** | | | **592** | **287 (48.48%)** | **297 (50.17%)** | **8 (1.35%)** | | **1116** | - |

Bold text indicates that the club qualified for the finals series in that year.

== AFL finals series ==
St Kilda Football Club's finals series records since the league changed its name to the AFL:

| Year | Premiership | Home & Away Season | Finals | Won | Lost | Drawn |
|---|---|---|---|---|---|---|
| 1991 | 5th | 4 | 1 | 0 | 1 | 0 |
| 1992 | 4th | 6 | 2 | 1 | 1 | 0 |
| 1997 | 2nd | Minor Premiers | 3 | 2 | 1 | 0 |
| 1998 | 6th | 6 | 2 | 0 | 2 | 0 |
| 2004 | 3rd | 3 | 3 | 1 | 2 | 0 |
| 2005 | 3rd | 4 | 2 | 1 | 1 | 0 |
| 2006 | 7th | 6 | 1 | 0 | 1 | 0 |
| 2008 | 4th | 4 | 3 | 1 | 2 | 0 |
| 2009 | 2nd | Minor Premiers | 3 | 2 | 1 | 0 |
| 2010 | 2nd | 3 | 4 | 2 | 1 | 1 |
| 2011 | 7th | 6 | 1 | 0 | 1 | 0 |
| 2020 | 5th | 6 | 2 | 1 | 1 | 0 |
| Record | ~ | Minor Premiers; 2 | 25 | 10 (40%) | 14 (56%) | 1 (4%) |

== AFL pre-season cups ==
St Kilda Football Club's pre-season cup records:

| Year | Finished | Played | Won | Lost |
|---|---|---|---|---|
| 1988 | ~ | ~ | ~ | ~ |
| 1989 | ~ | ~ | ~ | ~ |
| 1990 | ~ | ~ | ~ | ~ |
| 1991 | ~ | ~ | ~ | ~ |
| 1992 | ~ | ~ | ~ | ~ |
| 1993 | ~ | 1 | 0 | 1 |
| 1994 | ~ | 1 | 0 | 1 |
| 1995 | 3rd | 3 | 2 | 1 |
| 1996 | Winners | 4 | 4 | 0 |
| 1997 | 4th | 3 | 2 | 1 |
| 1998 | 2nd | 4 | 3 | 1 |
| 1999 | 4th | 3 | 2 | 1 |
| 2000 | ~ | 3 | 2 | 1 |
| 2001 | ~ | 3 | 1 | 2 |
| 2002 | ~ | 3 | 1 | 2 |
| 2003 | ~ | 1 | 0 | 1 |
| 2004 | Winners | 4 | 4 | 0 |
| 2005 | 6th | 2 | 1 | 1 |
| 2006 | 9th | 1 | 0 | 1 |
| 2007 | 11th | 1 | 0 | 1 |
| 2008 | Winners | 4 | 4 | 0 |
| 2009 | ~ | 1 | 0 | 1 |
| 2010 | 2nd | 4 | 3 | 1 |
| 2011 | 4th | 4 | 2 | 1 |
| 2012 | ~ | 5 | 2^ | 3 |
| Record | Winners; 3 | 55 | 33 (60.00%) | 21 (40.00%) |

Statistics do not include 1988 to 1992 as data is not available.
^ One win in the pre-season cup was a forfeit by Essendon after they failed to arrive for the game within the designated allowable time.

== Most goals ==
Most goals kicked by a player while playing with St Kilda Football Club.

| # | Goals | Name | Seasons |
|---|---|---|---|
| 1 | 898 | Tony Lockett | 1983–94 |
| 2 | 735 | Bill Mohr | 1929–41 |
| 3 | 718 | Nick Riewoldt | 2001–2017 |
| 4 | 594 | Stewart Loewe | 1986–02 |
| 5 | 574 | Stephen Milne | 2001–2013 |
| 6 | 390 | Fraser Gehrig | 2001–08 |
| 7 | 308 | Allan Davis | 1966–75 |
| 7 | 308 | Barry Breen | 1965–82 |
| 9 | 301 | Kevin Neale | 1965–77 |
| 10 | 299 | Peter Everitt | 1993–2002 |

== Record home game attendances ==
In home and away season games:

| Home | Away | Attendance | Venue | Year |
|---|---|---|---|---|
| St Kilda | Adelaide | 35,100 | Docklands | 2005 |
| St Kilda | Brisbane Bears | 18,360 | Moorabbin Oval | 1992 |
| St Kilda | Brisbane Lions | 52,539 | Docklands | 2004 |
| St Kilda | Carlton | 65,680 | MCG | 2025 |
| St Kilda | Collingwood | 82,528* | MCG | 2026 |
| St Kilda | Essendon | 69,255 | MCG | 2023 |
| St Kilda | Fitzroy | 31,780 | Waverley | 1989 |
| St Kilda | Fremantle | 35,329 | Docklands | 2004 |
| St Kilda | Geelong | 58,208 | MCG | 2010 |
| St Kilda | Gold Coast | 21,078 | Docklands | 2012 |
| St Kilda | Greater Western Sydney | 21,160 | Docklands | 2017 |
| St Kilda | Hawthorn | 49,373 | Docklands | 2010 |
| St Kilda | Melbourne | 40,004 | Docklands | 2005 |
| St Kilda | North Melbourne | 38,896 | Docklands | 2004 |
| St Kilda | Port Adelaide | 25,845 | Docklands | 2023 |
| St Kilda | Richmond | 71,488 | Waverley | 1998 |
| St Kilda | Sydney | 46,880 | Waverley | 1999 |
| St Kilda | West Coast | 40,177 | Docklands | 2006 |
| St Kilda | Western Bulldogs | 49,706 | Waverley | 1998 |

- Highest Home Game Attendance during a Home and Away Season at the MCG in St Kilda FC History.

== Record away game attendances ==
Record crowds when St Kilda were the away team in the club's home city of Melbourne for matches in home and away season games:

| Home | Away | Attendance | Venue | Year |
|---|---|---|---|---|
| Carlton | St Kilda | 55,658 | MCG | 2008 |
| Collingwood | St Kilda | 81,386 | MCG | 2010 |
| Essendon | St Kilda | 62,928 | MCG | 1999 |
| Geelong | St Kilda | 44,814 | Docklands | 2005 |
| Hawthorn | St Kilda | 43,181 | Waverley | 1997 |
| Melbourne | St Kilda | 72,114 | MCG | 1965 |
| North Melbourne | St Kilda | 44,287 | Docklands | 2016 |
| Richmond | St Kilda | 69,104 | MCG | 2017 |
| Western Bulldogs | St Kilda | 47,120 | Docklands | 2006 |

Record crowds when St Kilda were the away team against teams based outside the state of Victoria in home and away season games:

| Home | Away | Attendance | Venue | Year |
|---|---|---|---|---|
| Adelaide | St Kilda | 46,667 | Football Park | 1993 |
| Brisbane | St Kilda | 35,823 | 'Gabba | 2004 |
| Fremantle | St Kilda | 53,707 | Perth Stadium | 2026 |
| Gold Coast | St Kilda | 17,482 | Metricon, Carrara | 2011 |
| Greater Western Sydney | St Kilda | 12,633 | Manuka Oval | 2017 |
| Port Adelaide | St Kilda | 47,319 | Adelaide Oval | 2026 |
| Sydney | St Kilda | 63,369 | Stadium Australia | 2007 |
| West Coast | St Kilda | 54,188 | Perth Stadium | 2018 |

== Record scores ==
=== Highest scores ===
Record highest scores against each opponent:

| Team | Highest Score | Venue | Year |
|---|---|---|---|
| Adelaide | 24.18.162 | Moorabbin | 1991 |
| Brisbane | 28.18.186 | Docklands | 2005 |
| Carlton | 31.10.196 (Note: Highest score this club conceded or has conceded to any opponent.) | Docklands | 2004 |
| Collingwood | 22.16.148 | Waverley Park | 1982 |
| Essendon | 25.12.162 | Docklands | 2015 |
| Fitzroy | 23.23.161 | Junction Oval | 1970 |
| Fremantle | 19.12.126 | Docklands | 2007 |
| Geelong | 27.15.177 | Waverley Park | 1993 |
| Gold Coast | 21.18.144 | Carrara | 2012 |
| Greater Western Sydney | 25.13.163 | Docklands | 2012 |
| Hawthorn | 24.12.156 | Moorabbin | 1965 |
| Melbourne | 31.18.204 | M.C.G | 1978 |
| North Melbourne | 22.19.151 | Junction Oval | 1937 |
| Port Adelaide | 23.13.151 | Docklands | 2010 |
| Richmond | 27.12.174 | M.C.G | 2006 |
| Sydney | 24.14.158 | Moorabbin | 1991 |
| University | 18.20.128 | Junction Oval | 1913 |
| West Coast | 26.13.169 | Docklands | 2004 |
| Western Bulldogs | 23.19.157 | Western Oval | 1981 |

=== Lowest scores ===
Record lowest scores against each opponent:

| Team | Lowest Score | Venue | Year |
|---|---|---|---|
| Adelaide | 3.8.26 | Football Park | 1995 |
| Brisbane | 5.15.45 | Waverley Park | 1994 |
| Carlton | 1.1.7 | Junction Oval | 1915 |
| Collingwood | 1.0.6 | Victoria Park | 1898 |
| Essendon | 0.3.3 | East Melbourne Cricket Ground | 1897 |
| Fitzroy | 1.8.14 | Brunswick Street Oval | 1906 |
| Fremantle | 6.19.55 | Subiaco | 2007 |
| Geelong | 0.1.1 (Note: VFL/AFL record for all clubs) | Corio Oval | 1899 |
| Gold Coast | 9.10.64 | Carrara | 2012 |
| Greater Western Sydney | 6.13.49 | Sydney Showground | 2015 |
| Hawthorn | 3.9.27 | Junction Oval | 1956 |
| Melbourne | 1.5.11 | Junction Oval | 1957 |
| North Melbourne | 4.5.29 | M.C.G. | 1996 |
| Port Adelaide | 6.7.43 | Football Park | 2007 |
| Richmond | 1.10.16 | Punt Road Oval | 1910 |
| South Melbourne | 0.2.2 | Lake Oval | 1897 |
| University | 4.2.26 | East Melbourne Cricket Ground | 1909 |
| West Coast | 4.5.29 | W.A.C.A. | 2000 |
| West Coast | 3.11.29 | Subiaco Oval | 2016 |
| Western Bulldogs | 4.5.29 | Western Oval | 1981 |

==== Lowest scores since 1919 ====
Lowest post-1919 scores against all pre-1919 opponents except University (who disbanded in 1915):

| Team | Lowest Score Since 1919 | Venue | Year |
|---|---|---|---|
| Carlton | 3.6.24 | Princes Park | 1928 |
| Collingwood | 3.10.28 | Docklands | 2002 |
| Essendon | 2.11.23 | Junction Oval | 1926 |
| Fitzroy | 0.18.18 | Junction Oval | 1921 |
| Geelong | 3.9.27 | Kardinia Park | 1987 |
| Melbourne | 1.5.11 | Junction Oval | 1957 |
| Richmond | 5.6.36 | Junction Oval | 1930 |
| South Melbourne | 2.6.18 (Note: Since 1920, St. Kilda’s lowest score against South Melbourne or the Sydney Swans has been 2.18.30 at the Junction Oval in Round 9, 1954.) | Lake Oval | 1919 |

== Record winning margins ==
Record winning margins in the Australian Football League (formerly the Victorian Football League, established 1897).

| Team | Winning Margin | Venue | Year |
|---|---|---|---|
| Adelaide | 131 | Moorabbin | 1991 |
| Brisbane | 139 | Docklands | 2005 |
| Carlton | 108 | Docklands | 2004 |
| Collingwood | 88 | Docklands | 2009 |
| Essendon | 110 | Docklands | 2015 |
| Fremantle | 83 | Docklands | 2009 |
| Geelong | 94 | Kardinia Park | 1971 |
| Hawthorn | 109 | Junction Oval | 1950 |
| Melbourne | 88 | M.C.G | 2005 |
| North Melbourne | 104 | Docklands | 2010 |
| Port Adelaide | 94 | Docklands | 2010 |
| Richmond | 103 | M.C.G | 2006 |
| Sydney | 101 | S.C.G | 1998 |
| West Coast | 101 | Docklands | 2004 |
| Western Bulldogs | 81 | Moorabbin | 1967 |

Miscellaneous records

- Most club best and fairest awards: 6 Nick Riewoldt (2002, 2004, 2006–07, 2009, 2014)
- Most consecutive games: 162 Callum Wilkie (2019–2026)
- Most seasons as leading goalkicker: 12 Bill Mohr (1929–1940)
- Most goals: 898 Tony Lockett (1983–1994)
- Most goals in a season: 132 Tony Lockett (1992)
- Most goals kicked in a game: 15 Tony Lockett (1992, v Sydney Swans)
- Most games: 383 Robert Harvey (1988–2008)
- Most matches as coach: 332 Allan Jeans (1961–1976)
