= One Tony Lockett =

Single by James Freud and the Reserves
- B-side: "That's Football"
- Released: June 1999
- Recorded: Song Zu Studios, Melbourne
- Genre: pop, rock
- Length: 3:23
- Label: Festival
- Songwriter(s): James Freud, Jose Fernandez Diaz
- Producer(s): James Freud, Tony Hunt

"One Tony Lockett" is a song recorded by Australian musician James Freud as a tribute to St Kilda and Sydney AFL player Tony Lockett, who booted his record-breaking 1300th goal shortly before the release of the track. The song utilises the music of the popular traditional Cuban song "Guantanamera". Released in 1999 with the backing of the Seven Network, the song charted in the Top 40 during the month of June, reaching a peak of #38.

The song began as a goal-scoring chant in the SCG's O'Reilly Stand. Sam Mercurio, Gus Mercurio's daughter in law, came up with the chant and eventually roused the whole stand every time "Plugger" scored a goal.

Sam Mercurio said, "A few seasons later, the whole SCG understood what we were singing and joined in, with James Freud eventually recording the tune."
