= List of St Kilda Football Club captains =

The following is a list of players who have been captains of the St Kilda Football Club (Australian rules football) in the Australian Football League (AFL), formerly the VFL.

== VFL/AFL ==
Dates	Captain(s)	Notes
1897-99	Billy Shaw	
1900	Cecil Sandford	
1901	Dick McCabe, Jimmy Smith	
1902	Joe Hogan	
1903	Bill Jackson, Jimmy Smith	
1904	Jimmy Smith	
1905	Vic Barwick	
1906	Jimmy Smith	
1907	Jack Wells	
1908	Jack Wells	
1909	Vic Barwick	
1910	Sam Gravenall	
1911	Gordon Dangerfield	
1912	George Morrissey	
1913	Harry Lever	
1914	Harry Lever, Dave McNamara	
1915	Gordon Dangerfield	
1918	Harry Lever	
1919	Wels Eicke	
1920	Roy Cazaly	
1921	Charlie Ricketts, Stan Williams	
1922	Bill Cubbins	
1923	Dave McNamara	
1924	Wels Eicke	
1925	Bill Cubbins, Barney Carr	
1926	Bill Cubbins	
1927	George Heinz, Horrie Mason	
1928	Horrie Mason, Bill Cubbins	
1929–30	Bill Cubbins	
1931	Harold Matthews	
1932	Stuart King	
1933	Col Deane, Clarrie Hindson	
1934	Colin Watson	
1935	Clarrie Hindson	
1936	Jack Perkins	
1937	Bill Mohr	
1938–39	Ansell Clarke	
1940	Stan Lloyd	
1941	Jack Knight	
1942–43	Reg Garvin	
1944	Frank Kelly, Clarrie Vontom	
1945	Clarrie Vontom	
1946–47	Allan Hird	
1948	Harold Bray	
1949–50	Fred Green	
1951–53	Keith Drinan	
1954–55	Les Foote	
1956–57	Keith Drinan	
1958	Brian Gleeson	
1959–62	Neil Roberts	
1963–68	Darrel Baldock	1966 Premiership Captain
1969	Ian Stewart	
1970–72	Ross Smith	
1973	Stuart Trott	
1974–75	Barry Lawrence	
1976–77	Carl Ditterich	
1978	Gary Colling	
1979	Barry Breen	
1980	Garry Sidebottom	
1981	Alex Jesaulenko, Bruce Duperouzel	
1982	Bruce Duperouzel	
1983–86	Trevor Barker	
1987–95	Danny Frawley	
1996–98	Nathan Burke, Stewart Loewe	
1998–00	Nathan Burke	
2001–02	Robert Harvey	
2003	Aaron Hamill	
2004	Lenny Hayes	
2005	Nick Riewoldt	
2006	Luke Ball	
2007	Lenny Hayes, Nick Riewoldt, Luke Ball (co-captains)	
2008–2016	Nick Riewoldt	Longest-serving captain
2017–2020	Jarryn Geary	
2021	Jarryn Geary, Jack Steele	
2022–2025	Jack Steele	
2026–	Jack Sinclair, Callum Wilkie	

== AFL Women's ==
Seasons	Captain(s)	Ref.
2020	Cat Phillips; Kate Shierlaw; Rhiannon Watt	
2021	Cat Phillips; Hannah Priest; Kate Shierlaw; Rhiannon Watt	
2022 (S6)–2025	Hannah Priest	
2026–	Serene Watson	
