= Nathan Burke =

Australian rules footballer, born 1970

Personal information
- Full name: Nathan Burke
- Born: 6 February 1970 (age 56)
- Original team: Pines
- Height: 180 cm (5 ft 11 in)
- Weight: 85 kg (187 lb)
- Position: Utility

Playing career^{1}
Years	Club	Games (Goals)
1987–2003	St Kilda	323 (123)

Coaching career^{3}
Years	Club	Games (W–L–D)
2020–2023	Western Bulldogs (W)	46 (18–27–1)
- ^{1} Playing statistics correct to the end of 2003.^{3} Coaching statistics correct as of 2023.

Career highlights
- 3× Trevor Barker Award: 1993, 1996, 1999; 4× All Australian: 1993, 1996, 1997, 1999; St Kilda Team of the Century; St Kilda Hall of Fame; Australian Football Hall of Fame; St Kilda Pre-Season Premiership Player: 1996

Nathan Burke (born 6 February 1970) is a former Australian rules footballer and former coach of the Western Bulldogs team in the AFL Women's competition (AFLW).

A tough rover, Burke is considered one of the most courageous footballers to play for the St Kilda Football Club. Burke set the club record for most games—323—at his retirement, which remained the benchmark until broken by former teammate Robert Harvey in round 7, 2006. Dozens of concussions during Burke's career led to him using a helmet.

In 2021, he was inducted into the Australian Football Hall of Fame.

== VFL/AFL playing career ==
Burke was co-captain in St Kilda's 1996 AFL Ansett Australia Cup winning side – the club's first AFL Cup win.

He started his football playing career with the Pines Football Club. His professional career spanned 1987–2003 despite missing most of 2002 with a knee injury, with Burke deciding to retire late in the season, in the Round 19 clash with Richmond, which the Saints won by 80 points. It was also notable for the fact that the coaching panel of Richmond that day included fellow St Kilda teammates Danny Frawley and Stewart Loewe, who stayed on the ground in honour of Burke following his parade lap (with Alex Lloyd's "Amazing" played at the ground).

== Post-playing career ==
Burke had been a director of the St Kilda Football Club from 2008 to 2015. He had joined the board with fellow player Andrew Thompson.

He is also a regular expert commentator on ABC Grandstand football coverage, an AFL analyst for Fox Sports News, and co hosts the Sunday Session on ABC radio. He is a feature article writer for Inside Football magazine also. This work complements his corporate guest speaking and school programs.

In 2015 he rejoined the AFL Match Review Panel, a role he held prior to joining the Board at St Kilda.

== Coaching career ==
In September 2019, Burke was due to become assistant coach in the AFL Women's with St Kilda, but was instead appointed by the Western Bulldogs to their head coach role from the 2020 AFL Women's season.

== Personal life ==
Burke's daughter, Alice, plays for St Kilda in the AFL Women's competition, and made her playing debut against the Western Bulldogs, whom he coached at the time. Burke's uncle Nick Bloom also played for St Kilda.

== Playing statistics ==
Legend
G	Goals	K	Kicks	D	Disposals	T	Tackles
B	Behinds	H	Handballs	M	Marks

Season	Team	No.	Games	Totals							Averages (per game)						
Season	Team	No.	Games	G	B	K	H	D	M	T	G	B	K	H	D	M	T
1987	St Kilda	48	16	2	0	179	96	275	40	33	0.1	0.0	11.2	6.0	17.2	2.5	2.1
1988	St Kilda	29	22	6	8	321	121	442	70	38	0.3	0.4	14.6	5.5	20.1	3.2	1.7
1989	St Kilda	29	21	12	4	265	143	408	66	38	0.6	0.2	12.6	6.8	19.4	3.1	1.8
1990	St Kilda	29	14	2	1	133	110	243	32	27	0.1	0.1	9.5	7.9	17.4	2.3	1.9
1991	St Kilda	29	23	3	1	316	180	496	64	53	0.1	0.0	13.7	7.8	21.6	2.8	2.3
1992	St Kilda	3	24	9	6	296	158	454	64	69	0.4	0.3	12.3	6.6	18.9	2.7	2.9
1993	St Kilda	3	20	9	7	322	148	470	68	72	0.5	0.4	16.1	7.4	23.5	3.4	3.6
1994	St Kilda	3	22	7	3	335	173	508	84	77	0.3	0.1	15.2	7.9	23.1	3.8	3.5
1995	St Kilda	3	18	9	7	318	122	440	75	49	0.5	0.4	17.7	6.8	24.4	4.2	2.7
1996	St Kilda	3	22	15	9	434	146	580	92	64	0.7	0.4	19.7	6.6	26.4	4.2	2.9
1997	St Kilda	3	25	9	14	469	200	669	99	75	0.4	0.6	18.8	8.0	26.8	4.0	3.0
1998	St Kilda	3	22	10	12	343	187	530	81	75	0.5	0.5	15.6	8.5	24.1	3.7	3.4
1999	St Kilda	3	21	4	1	299	157	456	96	49	0.2	0.0	14.2	7.5	21.7	4.6	2.3
2000	St Kilda	3	22	8	7	363	141	504	92	52	0.4	0.3	16.5	6.4	22.9	4.2	2.4
2001	St Kilda	3	10	10	2	127	82	209	28	22	1.0	0.2	12.7	8.2	20.9	2.8	2.2
2002	St Kilda	3	3	3	0	22	16	38	11	10	1.0	0.0	7.3	5.3	12.7	3.7	3.3
2003	St Kilda	3	18	6	10	132	89	221	57	38	0.3	0.6	7.3	4.9	12.3	3.2	2.1
Career			323	124	92	4674	2269	6943	1119	841	0.4	0.3	14.5	7.0	21.5	3.5	2.6

== Coaching statistics ==
Statistics correct to the end of the 2023 season

Legend
W	Wins	L	Losses	D	Draws	W%	Winning percentage	LP	Ladder position	LT	League teams

Season	Team	Games	W	L	D	W %	LP	LT
2020	Western Bulldogs	6	1	5	0	17%	6 (conf.)	7 (conf.)
2021	Western Bulldogs	9	5	4	0	56%	8	14
2022 (S6)	Western Bulldogs	10	4	5	1	40%	7	14
2022 (S7)	Western Bulldogs	11	7	4	0	64%	7	18
2023	Western Bulldogs	10	1	9	0	10%	18	18
Career totals		46	18	27	1	39%		

== Honours and achievements ==
**Brownlow Medal votes**
Season	Votes
1987	—
1988	3
1989	—
1990	—
1991	—
1992	10
1993	6
1994	4
1995	10
1996	20
1997	18
1998	4
1999	11
2000	6
2001	1
2002	—
2003	2
**Total**	**95**
Key:
Green / **Bold** = Won

- **Team**
  - McClelland Trophy (St Kilda): 1997
  - Pre-Season Cup (St Kilda): 1996
- **Individual**
  - All-Australian: 1993, 1996, 1997, 1999
  - Herald Sun Player of the Year Award: 1996
  - Trevor Barker Award (St Kilda F.C. Best & Fairest): 1993, 1996, 1999
  - St Kilda F.C. Captain: 1996-2000
  - Australian Representative Honours in International Rules Football: 1999
  - **Victorian Representative Honours**
