= Tony Lockett =

Australian rules footballer (born 1966)

Personal information
- Full name: Anthony Lockett
- Nickname: "Plugger"
- Born: 9 March 1966 (age 60); Ballarat, Victoria
- Original team: North Ballarat (BFL)
- Height: 191 cm (6 ft 3 in)
- Weight: 112 kg (247 lb)
- Position: Full-forward

Playing career^{1}
Years	Club	Games (Goals)
1983–1994	St Kilda	183 (898)
1995–1999, 2002	Sydney	98 (462)
Total		281 (1360)

Representative team honours
Years	Team	Games (Goals)
	Victoria	5 (19)
- ^{1} Playing statistics correct to the end of 2002.

Career highlights
- Club: Most goals scored by an individual in the VFL/AFL: 1,360; Brownlow Medal: (1987); 4× Coleman Medal: (1987, 1991, 1996, 1998); 10× St Kilda leading goalkicker: 1984, 1985, 1986, 1987, 1989, 1990, 1991, 1992, 1993, 1994; 5× Sydney leading goalkicker: 1995, 1996, 1997, 1998, 1999; 2× St Kilda Best & Fairest: (1987, 1991); Bob Skilton Medal: (1995); VFLPA MVP: (1987); 5× All-Australian team: (1991, 1992, 1995, 1996, 1998); E. J. Whitten Medal: (1995); Australian Football Hall of Fame, inducted 2006, Legend status 2015; Sydney Team of the Century – Full-forward; St Kilda Team of the Century – Full-forward

Anthony Howard Lockett (born 9 March 1966) is a former Australian rules footballer who played for the St Kilda Football Club and Sydney Swans in the Australian Football League (AFL). Nicknamed "Plugger", he played as a full-forward and holds the VFL/AFL record for career goals, scoring 1,360 goals in total.

Inducted into the Australian Football Hall of Fame in 2006 and upgraded to Legend status in 2015, he is the most prolific goalkicker in VFL/AFL history, breaking Gordon Coventry's 62-year record in 1999 with his 1300th goal and eventually finishing with 1,360 goals from 281 games. He became the first full-forward to be awarded the Brownlow Medal (achieved in 1987), won the Coleman Medal four times, and kicked more than 100 goals in a season on six occasions (an AFL record he shares with Jason Dunstall of Hawthorn).

While Lockett's accomplishments and statistics support his status as an Australian football hero, his individual influence on St. Kilda and Sydney is also noteworthy. He arrived at St Kilda when the club was in the doldrums and became the man on whose shoulders the club's fortunes depended. Similarly, when he moved to Sydney in 1995, the Swans were struggling both on and off the field; they had finished bottom of the ladder in 1994 and were battling to stay relevant in the heart of rugby league territory. After kicking more than 100 goals three times in four seasons and famously booting a point to send Sydney into the 1996 AFL Grand Final, Lockett helped to ensure Australian rules football would have a lasting future in the Harbour City.

Lockett's achievements are all the more remarkable given the significant chunks of time he missed through injury and suspension. Besides suffering from chronic asthma, he struggled to maintain his weight (which fluctuated from 95 to 112 kg over the years, according to listings in AFL Records) and required painkillers to manage the ongoing effects of a torn groin muscle. Lockett was not afraid to use his size and strength to unsettle opponents, but his aggression also resulted in him being frequently reported for striking and rough conduct. He appeared before the AFL Tribunal 16 times over his career and was suspended for a total of 23 matches.

== Early life ==
Born in the western Victorian town of Ballarat to Howard Lockett, a local football champion who would later be inducted in the North Ballarat Football Club Hall of Fame, and Liz, Lockett is one of three siblings, with a brother (Neil) and a sister (Di). Lockett's passion for greyhound racing can be traced to his grandfather Charlie, who supplied pacemakers for the local greyhound racing club and was a club committeeman at North Ballarat.

Lockett was educated at Ballarat Secondary College and Ballarat Grammar School, and began playing Australian football with the Under-12s team of his father's club, North Ballarat Football Club, in 1974. He played a total of 120 junior games with the club. He had played just five senior games as a 16-year-old in 1982 with North Ballarat before he was recruited by St Kilda, since Ballarat was part of the club's recruiting zone.

== VFL/AFL career ==
=== St Kilda: 1983–1994 ===
==== 1983–1986 ====
When Lockett arrived at St Kilda in 1983, the club was going through a period of decline on and off the field; in his first four seasons at Moorabbin, the Saints would finish at the bottom of the ladder. As a teenager coming out of Ballarat for the first time, Lockett was constantly homesick in his early years and eventually St Kilda conceded to his desire to travel from home when required.
Lockett made his senior VFL debut in Round 4 against Geelong at VFL Park. There was a high degree of controversy surrounding this game since the Saints, after seeking legal advice, decided to include Sydney's Paul Morwood in their line-up without a clearance from the Swans or a permit from the League. According to the rules at the time, if the Saints had won, they would have risked forfeiting the premiership points. As it turned out, they went down in a spirited effort by 11 points. Lockett joined a special group of VFL/AFL players when he goaled with his first kick, but had an otherwise quiet debut with only five disposals and four marks.
Lockett was supposed to be understudy to the enigmatic Mark Jackson, whom the Saints had brought in from Melbourne on a three-year contract. But after Jackson was sacked mid-season, Lockett was given the role and finished the season with a modest return of 19 goals in 12 games.

In the opening game of 1984, the Saints were up against the previous season's runner-up Essendon at Moorabbin. starting up at full forward, Lockett matched his Essendon counterpart Paul Salmon goal for goal in an entertaining game which the Bombers won by 37 points after a tight first half. Both Lockett and Salmon would end up with seven goals. Lockett showed a glimpse of his explosive best in the third quarter when he kicked three goals in a four-minute spell, and beat a succession of opponents to be considered the Saints' best player.

Lockett was now recognised as one of the VFL's star forwards, and teams were trying to find players who could physically match him. In St Kilda's opening game of the 1986 VFL season against Footscray at Western Oval, Lockett was reported by four umpires for striking Bulldogs captain Rick Kennedy during the third quarter. Lockett pleaded guilty to the charge, claiming he had been provoked, and was suspended for two matches.

==== 1987–1990 ====
St Kilda's fortunes were finally about to turn when premiership captain Darrel Baldock was appointed coach for 1987 while still serving in the Parliament of Tasmania. He appointed Danny Frawley captain, having identified leadership qualities in the then 23-year-old full back, gave regular game time to newcomers Nathan Burke and Nicky Winmar, who would become club stalwarts for the following decade, and set about improving the general skill level of the playing group. Under Baldock's guidance, Lockett had a career-best season, tying for the Brownlow Medal with John Platten.

==== 1991–1992 ====
In the first half of the pre-season match against West Coast in February 1991, Lockett was sprinting to contest for a loose ball when West Coast's Steve Malaxos, who was also running for the ball, collided with Lockett and made contact with his lower back, resulting in a cracked vertebra. Lockett limped off the ground gingerly and was sent to hospital for x-rays at half time. He was initially diagnosed as having suffered a "badly bruised back". According to champion Hawthorn full-forward Peter Hudson, who was St Kilda's club manager at the time, it was expected that Lockett would return for the following pre-season game. However, the misdiagnosed injury would sideline Lockett for the first six rounds of the 1991 AFL season.
In Round 7 the Saints played League newcomers Adelaide at Moorabbin. At the time St Kilda was ninth on the ladder, having played five matches for two wins and one draw. Boosted by the return of Lockett and Nicky Winmar (who was back after serving a 10-match suspension from the previous season), the signs were ominous early when, from the opening bounce, star midfielder Robert Harvey collected the ball out of the centre and found Lockett with a well-weighted pass. Lockett converted from the set shot, and thereafter, with a full-capacity crowd of over 25,000 spectators cheering them on, St Kilda went on a scoring rampage. Lockett added a further three goals for the quarter, and had nine to his name by half time. The Saints increased their lead at each change, eventually winning by 131 points and breaking the previous club record for greatest winning margin. Lockett finished the game with 12 goals, and the percentage-boosting win lifted St Kilda to fifth on the ladder.
Lockett backed up his spectacular return with ten goals the following week against Brisbane Bears (he had seven goals by half time) and another haul of 12 goals against Sydney (in which he kicked St Kilda's first five goals) to take his overall tally to a remarkable 34 goals in three games. In the Round 10 match against Essendon, however, before the biggest home crowd at Moorabbin since 1981, St Kilda suffered stage fright, conceding a 44-point lead at quarter time and eventually losing by 28 points. Essendon coach Kevin Sheedy sacrificed an extra player in defence to cut off the supply to Lockett (who only managed four goals), while the Bombers' team pressure and discipline also contributed significantly to the win.
St Kilda rebounded strongly in Round 11, putting in a superb second-half display to beat Hawthorn at Princes Park for the first time at that venue since 1976. Lockett kicked seven goals for the game to again be among the Saints' best players, but was afterwards cited by video for two incidents – clashing heavily with Hawks ruckman Stephen Lawrence in the first quarter and later with Greg Madigan. However, no further action was taken and Lockett was cleared to play.
In Round 23 St Kilda confirmed its place in the 1991 AFL finals series with a 120-point thrashing of Brisbane at Moorabbin, marking the club's first finals appearance since 1973. Lockett sat out the game, having been ill with influenza and warned by the club's medical staff that playing could trigger an asthma attack.
In the Elimination final against Geelong, he kicked nine goals and five behinds, although the Saints were beaten by seven points.

In 1992, he kicked the most goals that season, with 132 goals. He was described by dual Brownlow medallist Robert Harvey as the best player he had ever seen.

==== 1993–1994 ====
After the highs of personal glory and reaching the finals in 1991 and 1992, there followed two difficult seasons, which would turn out to be Lockett's last ones at the Saints, marred by long absences due to injury and suspension.

After kicking five goals in the loss to Hawthorn in the opening round of the 1994 AFL season, Lockett started well against North Melbourne in the Round 2 clash at the MCG, kicking three quick goals, only to suffer a corked right calf muscle shortly afterward. With Lockett unable to return after quarter time, and Stewart Loewe already absent with a groin injury, the Saints lacked a key target in attack and the Kangaroos won easily by 69 points. Lockett would end up missing the next four weeks, during which the Saints won only one game.

Few games better encapsulated Lockett's enigmatic nature than his return in the Round 7 match against Sydney at the Sydney Cricket Ground. In the first quarter, Swans defender Peter Caven was sprinting back to take an intercept mark when Lockett, who was charging towards the ball, appeared to hit him in the face with a raised elbow. Caven was knocked unconscious with a compound fracture of the nose and immediately taken to St Vincent's Hospital for surgery, ruling him out of action for 12 weeks. Lockett was subjected to abuse by Sydney supporters for the remainder of the game, but it appeared to have little effect on him. The Swans responded on the scoreboard, at one stage leading by 51 points in the third quarter; only Lockett's seven goals up to three-quarter time had kept an inept-looking St Kilda in the contest. The Saints still trailed by 41 points halfway through the final term before they finally clicked, kicking seven unanswered goals (Lockett kicking the last three in the final three minutes) to snatch a one-point win. After kicking his eleventh goal to put the Saints in front, Lockett responded to the taunts of the Sydney cheer squad with an "up yours" gesture.
Lockett was not reported by any umpires for his hit on Caven, but subsequent review of the video footage by AFL officials on the Tuesday following the game resulted in Lockett being charged not just for the incident with Caven, but also for kneeing Daryn Cresswell in the head. In his appearance before the Tribunal, Lockett pleaded not guilty, stating that he was sorry for injuring Caven and had not done so intentionally. He added that he had only seen Caven a split second before impact, raising his elbow in self-defence. Nonetheless, Lockett was found guilty of striking and suspended for eight weeks.

Lockett would not play again until Round 17 against North Melbourne at Waverley Park, a 61-point loss in which he was held to two goals by Mick Martyn, one of the few full-backs capable of matching Lockett. By this stage of the season, the Saints were out of finals contention, sitting second-last on the ladder with the worst percentage in the League. Lockett did not take long to rediscover form, kicking 28 goals in a four-game stretch before being ruled out of the final game of the season against Fitzroy with a back injury. He ended the season with 56 goals, which was a slight improvement from his return the previous season.

=== Sydney: 1995–1999, 2002 ===
In 1995, Lockett transferred to the Sydney Swans, where he played for another six seasons. He was an instant success with the Swans, helping the team into the 1996 finals series and subsequently into the 1996 AFL Grand Final. With scores tied in the preliminary final game, Lockett famously kicked a point after the siren against Essendon to give Sydney a one-point victory. Despite a groin injury, he played in the grand final, which the Swans lost to North Melbourne. It was the only grand final appearance of Lockett's career.

Lockett's career-best goal-scoring performance came in Round 19, 1995, against Fitzroy at the Western Oval, when he scored 16 goals straight.

Lockett became a cult figure in Sydney. He was a massive drawcard for the struggling Sydney Swans, who had previously found it difficult to attract large support in New South Wales's rugby league heartland. At the height of his popularity, the song "One Tony Lockett" was released (sung to the tune of "Guantanamera"), performed by James Freud.

In 1996, Lockett was the subject of much hype in the clash between Geelong and Sydney in which Gary Ablett Sr. was playing at the other end of the ground. The match was billed by the media as Plugger vs God and set a ground record attendance at the Sydney Cricket Ground. He broke the record of 1,299 career goals (set by Gordon Coventry) at the SCG in 1999 and sparked one of the biggest pitch invasions seen in Australian rules football.

Lockett retired at the end of 1999 but had a brief comeback in 2002, playing three games and adding three goals to his record for a grand total of 1,360 career goals.

=== State of Origin ===
Lockett played five State of Origin games for Victoria, kicking 19 goals in those games. In his State of Origin debut in 1985 against Western Australia, Lockett kicked one goal. He was selected in 1987 against South Australia, and again kicked one goal. In 1989, he kicked five goals in a notable game against South Australia at the MCG. He again kicked five goals against Western Australia in 1992. His final interstate match came in 1995 against South Australia, kicking seven goals and winning the E. J. Whitten Medal. Lockett is known as a big supporter of State of Origin and said after he won the E. J. Whitten Medal that "to win this medal will probably go down as one of the happiest days of my life, and I'll treasure it forever".

== Statistics ==
Legend
G	Goals	K	Kicks	D	Disposals	T	Tackles
B	Behinds	H	Handballs	M	Marks

Led the league for the season only
Led the league after finals only
Led the league after season and finals

Season	Team	No.	Games	Totals							Averages (per game)						
Season	Team	No.	Games	G	B	K	H	D	M	T	G	B	K	H	D	M	T
1983	St Kilda	37	12	19	17	76	26	102	44	—N/a	1.6	1.4	6.3	2.2	8.5	3.7	—N/a
1984	St Kilda	14	20	77	44	146	19	165	108	—N/a	3.9	2.2	7.3	1.0	8.3	5.4	—N/a
1985	St Kilda	14	21	79	22	146	32	178	112	—N/a	3.8	1.0	7.0	1.5	8.5	5.3	—N/a
1986	St Kilda	14	18	60	29	119	36	155	85	—N/a	3.3	1.6	6.6	2.0	8.6	4.7	—N/a
1987	St Kilda	14	22	117	52	226	49	275	164	16	5.3	2.4	10.3	2.2	12.5	7.5	0.7
1988	St Kilda	4	8	35	19	65	19	84	44	6	4.4	2.4	8.1	2.4	10.5	5.5	0.8
1989	St Kilda	4	11	78	24	122	18	140	92	5	7.1	2.2	11.1	1.6	12.7	8.4	0.5
1990	St Kilda	4	12	65	34	112	16	128	84	11	5.4	2.8	9.3	1.3	10.7	7.0	0.9
1991	St Kilda	4	17	127	51	190	33	223	140	7	7.5	3.0	11.2	1.9	13.1	8.2	0.4
1992	St Kilda	4	22	132	58	214	30	244	157	12	6.0	2.6	9.7	1.4	11.1	7.1	0.5
1993	St Kilda	4	10	53	12	85	26	111	63	7	5.3	1.2	8.5	2.6	11.1	6.3	0.7
1994	St Kilda	4	10	56	26	100	16	116	76	7	5.6	2.6	10.0	1.6	11.6	7.6	0.7
1995	Sydney	4	19	110	44	176	42	218	139	16	5.8	2.3	9.3	2.2	11.5	7.3	0.8
1996	Sydney	4	22	121	63	212	45	257	168	21	5.5	2.9	9.6	2.0	11.7	7.6	1.0
1997	Sydney	4	12	37	21	65	23	88	50	7	3.1	1.8	5.4	1.9	7.3	4.2	0.6
1998	Sydney	4	23	109	36	167	41	208	121	9	4.7	1.6	7.3	1.8	9.0	5.3	0.4
1999	Sydney	4	19	82	38	141	27	168	112	15	4.3	2.0	7.4	1.4	8.8	5.9	0.8
2002	Sydney	46	3	3	0	5	2	7	1	3	1.0	0.0	1.7	0.7	2.3	0.3	1.0
Career			281	1360	590	2367	500	2867	1760	142	4.8	2.1	8.4	1.8	10.2	6.3	0.7

== Life outside football ==
During his time at St Kilda, Lockett resented the attention that came with his superstar status in Victorian football, and was well known for his distrust of the media. In one particularly famous incident in 1988, he was at the Mercy Private Hospital with his father to receive treatment for the serious ankle injury he had sustained against North Melbourne, but had not been informed by St Kilda club officials that a media contingent, which included Eddie McGuire as a reporter for Network Ten, would also be in attendance. Caught by surprise, Lockett angrily hurled both his crutches at the cameraman.

After retiring, Lockett purchased a rural property near Bowral in the Southern Highlands of New South Wales and moved there with his wife Vicki and four daughters.

In a 2014 interview, he dismissed the idea that he had become a recluse since retiring, stating that he was simply enjoying the quiet life of an ex-footballer.

The move to Sydney, and the relative anonymity that came with it, appeared to soften Lockett. He even appeared in various television commercials, including Advanced Hair and Lowes Menswear (in Sydney). While at a taping session for a Lowes commercial, Lockett engaged in a friendly wrestling match with former amateur rugby player Adrian "Ace" Mueller, who was at the time working for Lowes corporate division. According to some reports, the friendly wrestle developed into something quite competitive, with Lockett pinning Mueller (an exponent of the Israeli self-defence system Krav Maga). Lockett appeared with Stephen Curry and Dave Lawson in a Toyota Memorable Moments advertisement that takes a lighthearted look at some memorable moments in his career such as the piglet "Pluga", "One Tony Lockett", "That Point" and his 1,300th goal (including the pitch invasion).

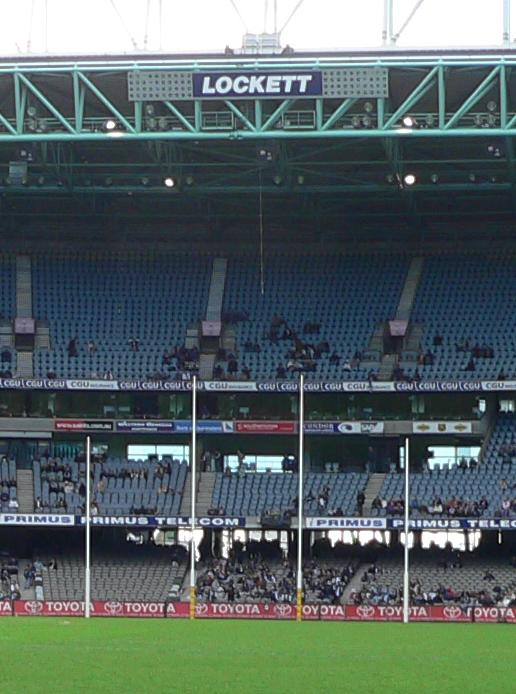
The Lockett End at Docklands Stadium

Lockett is also well known for his interest in greyhound racing.

Lockett has competed in the gruelling Finke Desert Race in the open motorcycle class since 2008, and for the over-45s subcategory on many occasions between 2011 and 2019, riding in 2017, 2018, and 2019 by using his KTM 500 EXC.

In 2017, Lockett made a surprise decision to return to the Sydney Swans as a part-time goalkicking and forwards coach.

== Nickname ==
Lockett's father, Howard, inherited the nickname "Plugger" from his own father, who used to "plug around" in the garden. Howard Lockett, who himself played 500 games of country football, then saw it fit to pass down the nickname once more to his son, and it serendipitously became synonymous with his large size.

In Round 18, 1993, in a match at the Sydney Cricket Ground between St Kilda (then Lockett's club) and Sydney (his future club), a piglet (being a reference to Lockett's portly build) was released by a member of the Sydney crowd onto the ground (with the wrongly spelled nickname "Pluga" and Lockett's playing number of "4" spray-painted onto it) before being tackled to the ground and removed by Sydney Swans player Darren Holmes. The Channel Seven commentary of the incident had the famous exclamation of "There's a pig at full-forward!" from commentator Sandy Roberts. Lockett was actually absent from the match due to injury, which may have stimulated the idea for the prank in the first place as a joke replacement. A man named Mark claimed to be behind the prank and came forward on SEN1116 in 2017, 24 years after the fact.

== Legacy ==
Lockett was inducted to both the St Kilda and Sydney Swans' Team of the Century in 2001 and 2003, respectively.

In 2004, he was inducted into the North Ballarat Football Club hall of fame.

On 22 June 2006, Lockett was inducted into the Australian Football Hall of Fame. In 2015, he was elevated to "Legend" status.

The southern goal end at Docklands Stadium was named after him as the "Lockett End", with the other end being named after the footballer whose goal record he broke, Gordon Coventry.

The Ballarat Football League award for the leading goal-scorer for the home-and-away season is named after Lockett, as he played his junior football with Ballarat Football League club North Ballarat.

On 19 July 2009, Lockett was inducted into the Sydney Swans Hall of Fame.

In 2003, he was inducted into the St Kilda Football Club Hall of Fame; on 24 July 2010, he was elevated to "Legend" status.

Lockett kicked over one hundred goals in a season on six occasions: at St Kilda in years 1987 (117), 1991 (127), and 1992 (132); and at Sydney in years 1995 (110), 1996 (121), and 1998 (109). This is a tied league record for the number of times a player has kicked over 100 goals in a separate season (which he shares with Jason Dunstall).

The New South Wales Primary Schools Sports Association Australian Football competition is named the Tony Lockett Shield.

In 2017, Lockett was inducted into the Sport Australia Hall of Fame.

In March 2021, before the Round 2 match between St Kilda and Melbourne at Marvel Stadium set aside to honour the memory of former Saints captain and Fox Footy personality Danny Frawley and promote mental health awareness, Lockett made a surprise appearance, along with Garry Lyon and Stewart Loewe, to pay tribute to his late friend and captain.

== See also ==
- After the siren kicks in Australian rules football

== Bibliography ==
- Piesse, Ken; Lockett, Tony (1992). Plugger: the Tony Lockett story. Sydney, Australia: Pan Macmillan Publishers. ISBN 0-7251-0709-X.
