= Rhiannon Watt =

Australian rules footballer

Personal information
- Born: 8 December 1987 (age 38)
- Original team: Southern Saints (VFL Women's)
- Draft: No. 40, 2018 AFLW draft
- Debut: Round 2, 2019, Carlton vs. Adelaide, at Ikon Park
- Height: 184 cm (6 ft 0 in)
- Position: Ruck

Club information
- Current club: Melbourne

Playing career^{1}
| Years | Club | Games (Goals) |
| 2019 | Carlton | 2 (0) |
| 2020–2022 (S6) | St Kilda | 22 (1) |
| 2022 (S7)– | Melbourne | 2 (0) |
| Total | | 26 (1) |
- ^{1} Playing statistics correct to the end of the 2023 season.

Career highlights
- St Kilda co-captain: 2020-

Rhiannon Watt (born 8 December 1987) is an Australian rules footballer who plays for Melbourne in the AFL Women's competition (AFLW). She has previously played for Carlton and St Kilda.

== AFLW career ==
Watt was drafted by Carlton with the 40th pick overall in the 2018 AFLW draft. Watt made her AFLW debut in round 2 of the 2019 season. She signed with St Kilda in the expansion signing period in April 2019, and was named a co-captain of the club in January 2020. It was revealed Watt had signed on with St Kilda for one more year In June 2021, tying her to the club until the end of 2022 AFL Women's season 6. In June 2022, following an anterior cruciate ligament injury, Watt was delisted by St Kilda. A few days later, Melbourne signed Watt as a delisted free agent.
