= Alice Burke (footballer) =

Australian rules footballer (b.2002)

Personal information
- Full name: Alice Burke
- Born: 3 October 2002 (age 24)
- Original team: Sandringham Dragons (NAB League)
- Draft: Father–daughter selection, 2021
- Debut: Round 1, 2021, St Kilda vs. Western Bulldogs, at RSEA Park
- Height: 167 cm (5 ft 6 in)

Club information
- Current club: St Kilda
- Number: 3

Playing career^{1}
Years	Club	Games (Goals)
2021–	St Kilda	32 (1)
- ^{1} Playing statistics correct to the end of the 2023 season.

Alice Burke (born 3 October 2002) is an Australian rules footballer who plays for St Kilda in the AFL Women's (AFLW).

Burke's father, Nathan Burke, played over 300 games for St Kilda in the Australian Football League competition, and formerly coached the Western Bulldogs between 2020 and 2023. Her debut game was a victory against the Bulldogs in the opening round of the 2021 AFLW season. It was revealed Burke had signed on with the Saints for two more years on 30 June 2021, tying her to the club until the end of the 2022/2023 season.

She was educated at Haileybury College.
