= Hannah Priest =

Australian rules footballer (born 1992)

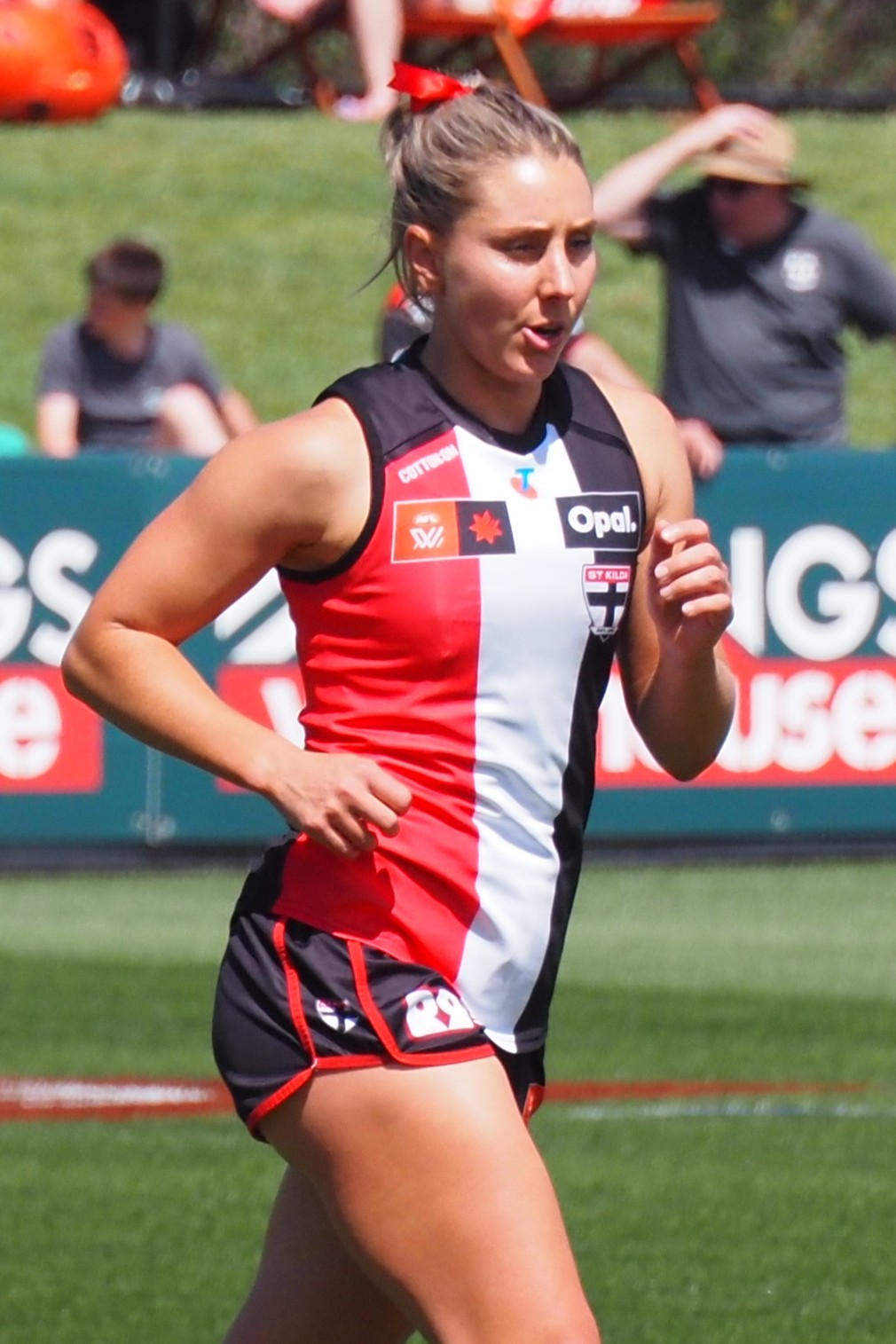
- Priest pre-match with St Kilda in 2025

Personal information
- Full name: Hannah Priest
- Born: 16 May 1992 (age 34)
- Original team: Norwood (SANFLW)
- Draft: No. 41, 2019 national draft
- Debut: Round 1, 2020, St Kilda vs. Western Bulldogs, at RSEA Park
- Height: 168 cm (5 ft 6 in)
- Position: Midfielder

Club information
- Current club: St Kilda
- Number: 14

Playing career^{1}
Years	Club	Games (Goals)
2020–	St Kilda	45 (1)
- ^{1} Playing statistics correct to the end of the 2023 season.

Career highlights
- St Kilda captain: 2021 (co-captain), 2022–

Hannah Priest (born 16 May 1992) is an Australian rules footballer who plays for St Kilda in the AFL Women's (AFLW). It was revealed Priest had signed on with the Saints for two more years on 30 June 2021, tying her to the club until the end of the 2022/2023 season. After serving as co-captain during the 2021 season, Priest was named the Saints' sole captain in November 2021.
