= Jarryn Geary =

Australian rules footballer (born 1988)

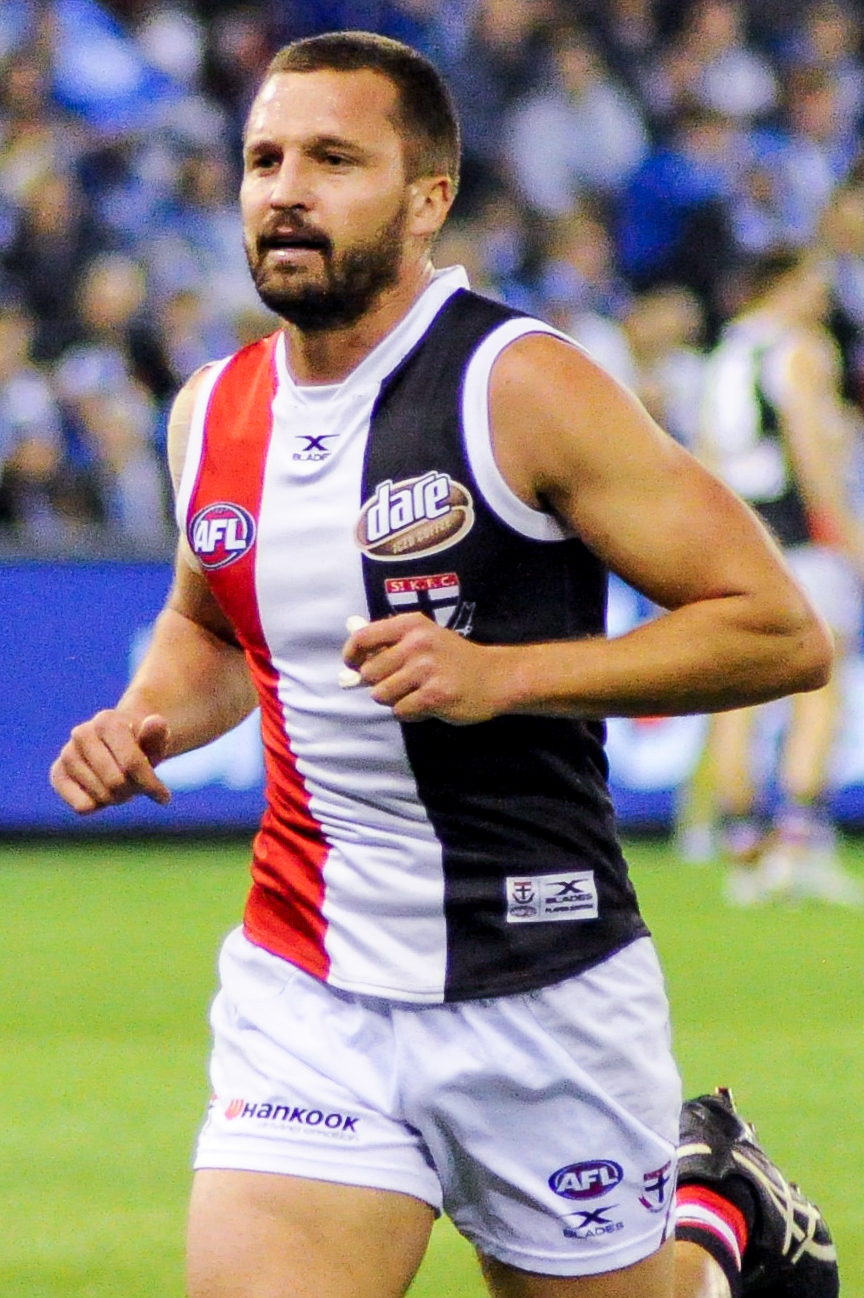
- Geary playing for St Kilda in June 2017

Personal information
- Full name: Jarryn Geary
- Born: 23 June 1988 (age 38)
- Original team: Bendigo Pioneers (TAC Cup)
- Draft: No. 58, 2007 rookie draft
- Height: 183 cm (6 ft 0 in)
- Weight: 82 kg (181 lb)
- Position: Defender / Midfielder

Playing career^{1}
Years	Club	Games (Goals)
2008–2022	St Kilda	207 (34)
- ^{1} Playing statistics correct to the end of 2022.

Career highlights
- St Kilda captain: 2017–2021 (co-captain 2021); 2009 AFL Rising Star nominee; Pre Season Premiership: 2008

Jarryn Geary (born 23 June 1988) is a retired Australian rules footballer who played for the St Kilda Football Club in the Australian Football League (AFL). Geary was St Kilda captain from 2017 to 2020 and co-captain in 2021.

== Junior career ==
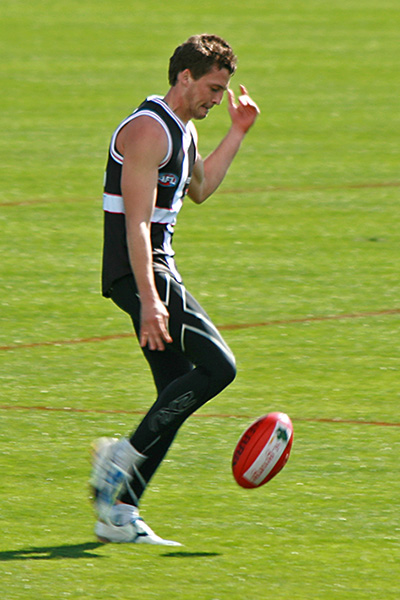
Geary at training prior to the 2009 AFL Grand Final

Geary played junior football with the Eaglehawk Football Club, which led to his selection to play in the state-wide junior competition, the TAC Cup, for the Bendigo Pioneers. Despite winning Bendigo's under-18s' best and fairest player award in 2006, he was overlooked in the AFL national draft. Generally seen as a running half-back or midfield player, Geary was selected by St Kilda with pick 58 in the 2006 AFL Rookie Draft, a busy rookie draft for the Saints which also saw Clinton Jones, Luke van Rheenen, Robert Eddy, James Wall and Jayden Attard selected. Geary was chosen with the sixth last pick overall.

== AFL career ==
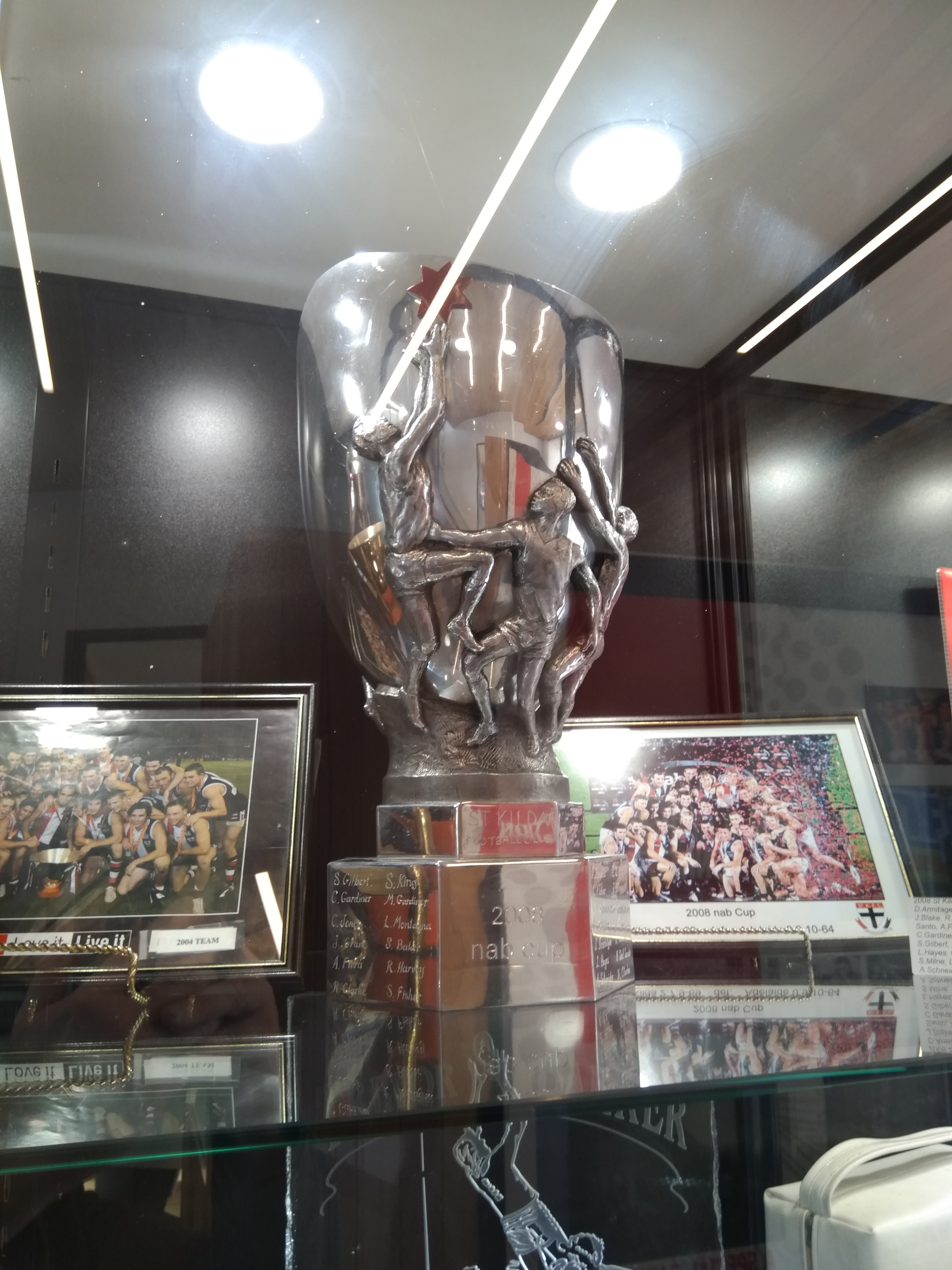
2008 NAB Cup at RSEA Park, Moorabbin

=== 2007–2008: debut ===
At the end of the 2007 season, Geary was elevated onto St Kilda's primary list for 2008. His career started positively, playing in the pre-season 2008 NAB Cup competition which St Kilda won in the final against Adelaide.

In Round 1, 2008, Geary made his home and away season debut for the Saints, gathering 21 possessions as one of the best-on-ground players against the Sydney Swans. He played a total of 10 games in 2008, a season which ended at the Preliminary Final stage for the Saints. Geary was nominated for the AFL Rookie of the Year award, the Rising Star, for his 19-possession game against Essendon in Round 8.

=== 2009–2010 ===
Geary played in 15 of St Kilda's 22 matches in the 2009 home and away rounds, with a 100% record of 15 wins, averaging 16.9 disposals per game. He played the first 14 games in a row, then his only further appearance for the season was in the Round 19 win over Hawthorn. St Kilda dominated the competition and qualified in first position for the AFL finals series, winning the minor premiership McClelland Trophy. Geary was not selected to play in any of St Kilda's finals matches.

In 2010, Geary played in 19 of St Kilda's 22 home and away matches, averaging 16.5 disposals per game. St Kilda qualified third for the AFL finals series, but Geary was again overlooked for the finals, not being selected for any of the Saints finals matches.

Celebratory Games
Year	Tally
2011	50th Game - Round 23 versus North Melbourne
2014	100th Game - Round 7 versus Hawthorn
2017	150th Game* - Round 9 versus Sydney Swans (*Life Membership)
2020	200th Game - Round 16 versus Hawthorn
2021	Final Game - Round 12 versus Sydney Swans

=== 2011–2015: Finals, St Kilda's downturn ===
Geary was not selected to play in the 2011 premiership season until Round 18 against Adelaide, playing every game for the remainder of the season. He played in his first finals match in the losing second eliminati'son final which ended St Kilda's season.

In the 2012 and 2013 seasons, Geary played 20 and 21 games respectively, averaging 17.6 disposals per game for both seasons. He had his most productive career match in the final game for the year, the Round 23 match against Fremantle at Docklands Stadium, which was notable as being the final game for Saints legends Justin Koschitzke, Jason Blake and Stephen Milne. St Kilda won the match by 71 points. A broken arm ended Geary's season in the Round 7 of 2014.

In the 2015 season, Geary again play mainly across half-back, where he solidified his reputation as a dependable and courageous defender. He played 20 games for the season, averaging 19.2 per game. In 2016, Geary played 21 games, averaging just over 15 disposals per game.

=== 2017–2020: Captaincy and return to finals ===
In 2017, Geary took over as captain from St Kilda's longest-serving captain, Nick Riewoldt, in what was to be Riewoldt's final season as a player. He played every game for the year, averaging 16 disposals per game, with St Kilda finishing 11th on the ladder. Geary was again prominent in 2018, in what was a difficult year for the Saints, playing in 20 of St Kilda's 22 matches. He had his most productive season at the Saints, average over 20 disposals per game for the first time in his career. In 2019 he played four of the first five games before being injured and did not play again until the round 11 against Port Adelaide held in China. Geary suffered a serious broken leg in the match which ended his season.

Geary again captained the Saints in a 2020 season disrupted by the COVID-19 pandemic. Matches were reduced to four fifths of full length (16 minutes plus time on per quarter) and the season as a whole was reduced to 17 home and away matches. In a season that was rescheduled regularly during the year, with games schedules released in small blocks, St Kilda proved to be resilient to the disruptions, despite the hardships caused by the ad-hoc scheduling. Big wins over the Sydney Swans in the annual Pride Game by 53 points, and over GWS Giants by 52 points in the final round, both at the Gabba, helped secure St Kilda's finals series qualification. St Kilda won the second elimination final, with Geary playing as a defensive forward. He kicked three goals, including the Saints' final goal, also being involved in other scoring chains, and had 12 disposals. St Kilda lost the following week's semi-final.

=== 2021–2022: Co-captaincy and retirement ===
Jack Steele joined Geary as co-captain ahead of the 2021 season. St Kilda finished 10th and missed the finals series. The round 12 match against the Sydney Swans turned out to be Geary's last game.

On 14 July 2022, after not playing an AFL match during the season, Geary announced his retirement from AFL football after 16 seasons and 207 games for St Kilda. He was awarded honorary life membership to St Kilda for playing 150 games or more.

== Statistics ==
Statistics are correct to the end of round 8, 2022

Legend
G	Goals	K	Kicks	D	Disposals	T	Tackles
B	Behinds	H	Handballs	M	Marks

Season	Team	No.	Games	Totals							Averages (per game)							Votes
Season	Team	No.	Games	G	B	K	H	D	M	T	G	B	K	H	D	M	T	Votes
2008	St Kilda	42	10	0	3	56	58	114	36	13	0.0	0.3	5.6	5.8	11.4	3.6	1.3	0
2009	St Kilda	42	15	7	5	143	111	254	70	50	0.5	0.3	9.5	7.4	16.9	4.7	3.3	0
2010	St Kilda	14	19	4	3	166	148	314	74	62	0.2	0.2	8.7	7.8	16.5	3.9	3.3	0
2011	St Kilda	14	8	0	0	49	30	79	14	18	0.0	0.0	6.1	3.8	9.9	1.8	2.3	0
2012	St Kilda	14	20	2	3	189	163	352	78	41	0.1	0.2	9.5	8.2	17.6	3.9	2.1	0
2013	St Kilda	14	21	4	4	207	163	370	97	65	0.2	0.2	9.9	7.8	17.6	4.6	3.1	2
2014	St Kilda	14	7	2	1	65	50	115	27	19	0.3	0.1	9.3	7.1	16.4	3.9	2.7	0
2015	St Kilda	14	20	2	0	213	174	387	98	58	0.1	0.0	10.7	8.7	19.4	4.9	2.9	0
2016	St Kilda	14	21	3	2	164	156	320	71	48	0.1	0.1	7.8	7.4	15.2	3.4	2.3	0
2017	St Kilda	14	22	1	0	179	175	354	77	56	0.0	0.0	8.1	8.0	16.1	3.5	2.5	0
2018	St Kilda	14	20	3	1	193	208	401	78	48	0.2	0.1	9.7	10.4	20.1	3.9	2.4	0
2019	St Kilda	14	5	0	1	47	47	94	20	13	0.0	0.2	9.4	9.4	18.8	4.0	2.6	1
2020 (Note: The 2020 season was played with 17 home-and-away matches per team (down from 22) and 16-minute quarters with time on (down from 20-minute quarters with time on) due to the impact of the COVID-19 pandemic.)	St Kilda	14	16	5	1	83	83	166	48	28	0.3	0.1	5.2	5.2	10.4	3.0	1.8	0
2021	St Kilda	14	3	1	1	22	18	40	15	7	0.3	0.3	7.3	6.0	13.3	5.0	2.3	0
2022	St Kilda	14	0	–	–	–	–	–	–	–	–	–	–	–	–	–	–	–
Career			207	34	25	1776	1584	3360	803	526	0.2	0.1	8.6	7.7	16.2	3.9	2.5	3
