= Cat Phillips =

Australian rules footballer (born 1991)

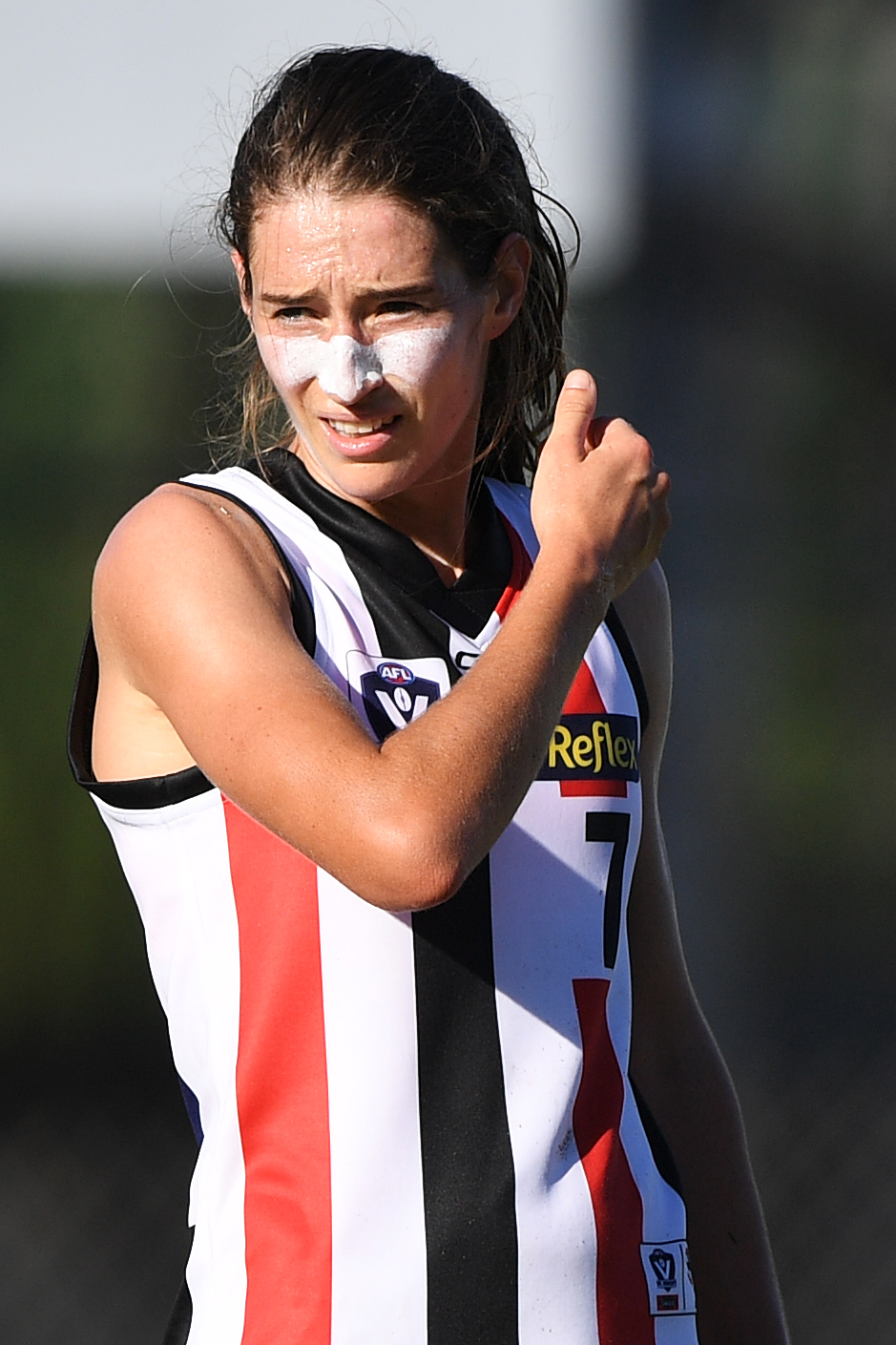
- Phillips in May 2019

Personal information
- Full name: Catherine Phillips
- Born: 13 October 1991 (age 35); England
- Debut: Round 1, 2017, Melbourne vs. Brisbane, at Casey Fields
- Height: 175 cm (5 ft 9 in)
- Position: Midfielder

Playing career^{1}
Years	Club	Games (Goals)
2017–2019	Melbourne	20 (6)
2020–2022 (S6)	St Kilda	24 (0)
2022 (S7)–2023	Essendon	10 (4)
Total		54 (10)
- ^{1} Playing statistics correct to the end of the 2023 season.

Career highlights
- St Kilda co-captain: 2020–

Catherine Phillips (born 13 October 1991) is an Australian rules footballer, playing for Essendon in the AFL Women's competition. She was recruited by Melbourne as a category B rookie in October 2016. She made her debut in the fifteen point loss to Brisbane at Casey Fields in the opening round of the 2017 season. She played every match in her debut season to finish with seven games.

Melbourne signed Phillips for the 2018 season during the trade period in May 2017.

In April 2019, Phillips joined expansion club St Kilda, and in January 2020 she was named an inaugural co-captain of the club. It was revealed Phillips had signed on with the Saints for one more year on 30 June 2021, tying her to the club until the end of 2022 season 6.

In May 2022, Phillips joined expansion club Essendon.

Phillips has also represented Australia in international competition in ultimate.
