= Jack Steele =

Australian rules footballer (born 1995)

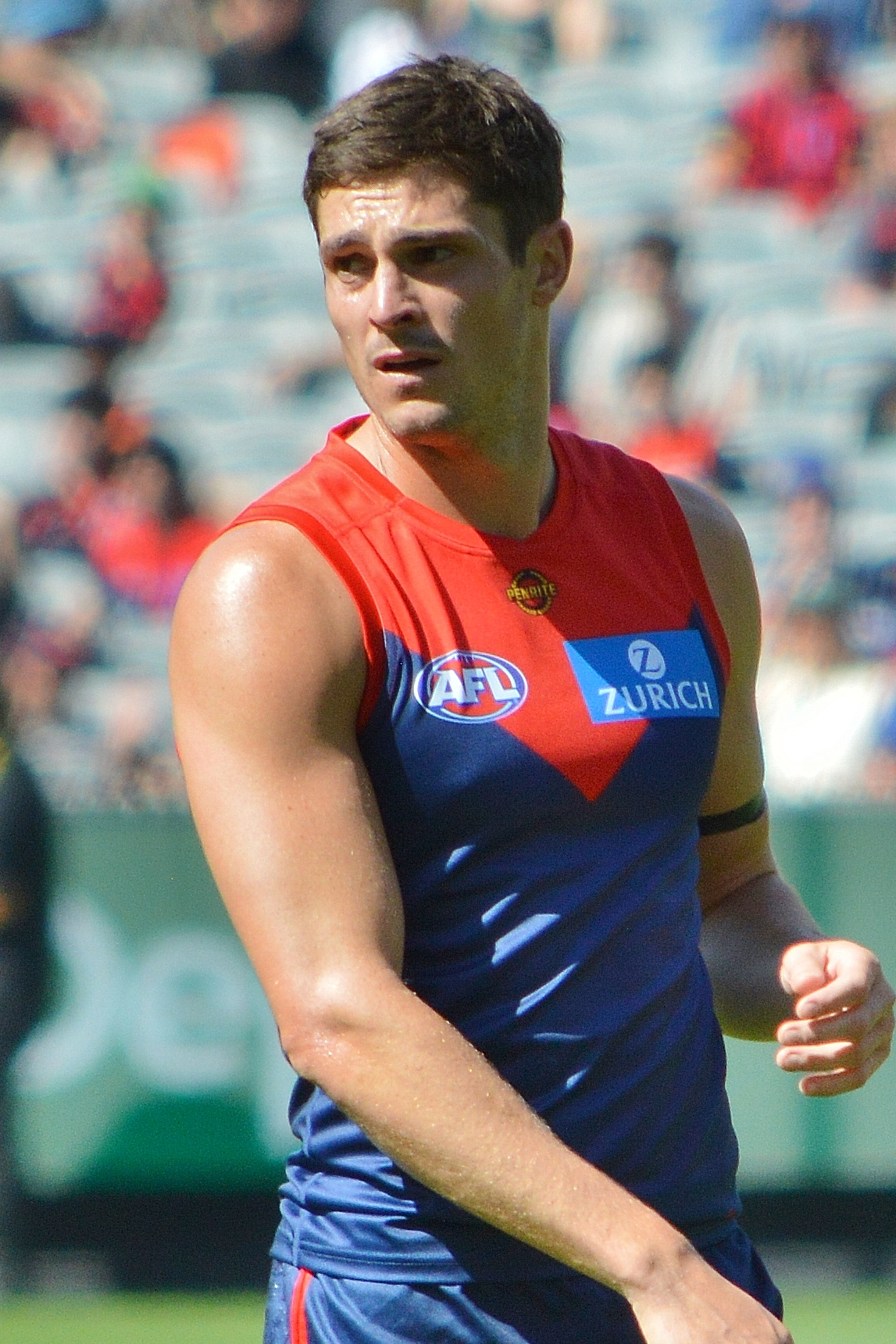
- Steele playing for Melbourne in 2026

Personal information
- Full name: Jack Steele
- Born: 13 December 1995 (age 30)
- Original team: NSW/ACT Rams (TAC Cup)
- Draft: No. 24, 2014 national draft
- Debut: Round 12, 2015, Greater Western Sydney vs. North Melbourne, at Spotless Stadium
- Height: 187 cm (6 ft 2 in)
- Weight: 90 kg (198 lb)
- Position: Midfielder

Club information
- Current club: Melbourne
- Number: 9

Playing career^{1}
Years	Club	Games (Goals)
2015–2016	Greater Western Sydney	17 (9)
2017–2025	St Kilda	185 (61)
2026–	Melbourne	22 (4)
Total		224 (74)
- ^{1} Playing statistics correct to the end of round 23, 2026.

Career highlights
- St Kilda co-captain: 2021; captain: 2022–2025; 2× All-Australian team: 2020, 2021; 2× Trevor Barker Award: 2020, 2021; Robert Rose Award: 2021

Jack Steele (born 13 December 1995) is a professional Australian rules footballer playing for the Melbourne Football Club in the Australian Football League (AFL). He previously played for the Greater Western Sydney Giants from 2015 to 2016 and the St Kilda Football Club from 2017 to 2025. Steele is a dual All-Australian and has won two Trevor Barker Awards. He served as St Kilda co-captain in 2021, and as the sole captain from 2022 to 2025.

== Early life ==
Steele is from Canberra, Australian Capital Territory (ACT). His father Stewart played Rugby League at club level for the West Wyalong Mallee Men in country New South Wales and several of Jack’s uncles also played Rugby League. Jack’s older sister Sophie represented the ACT in basketball as a junior. Steele's father suggested he play Australian rules football. Steele initially joined the Gungahlin Jets as a junior before switching to the Belconnen Magpies junior system. Steele was a Collingwood supporter as a youth. Steele was a budding sportsman as a junior, playing cricket and soccer, while he also played basketball with future tennis star Nick Kyrgios when he was 12. Steele eventually focused on AFL at around 15 or 16. Steele joined the GWS Giants' Academy at just 13 years of age and went on to play with the UWS Giants, the NSW/ACT Rams and continued playing for the Magpies (alongside future St Kilda teammate Logan Austin) while at the Academy. In 2012 Steele had a taste of football at senior level, playing six games for the University of Western Sydney (UWS) Giants in the NEAFL. In May 2013 Steele dislocated his knee at the team’s training camp in Coffs Harbour a week before the Under 18 National Championships. The injury forced him to miss the carnival and although he was eligible for selection at the 2013 AFL Draft he was overlooked. As he had in 2013, Steele played junior football Steele played games at senior level in the NEAFL for both Belconnen and UWS Giants in 2014. Steele averaged averaging 24.7 disposals, 6.8 marks, 6.7 tackles, 12.0 contested possessions and 1.0 goals per game for Rams in the TAC Cup. At the 2014 Under 18 National Championships Steele was phenomenal in his three games for New South Wales/ACT, averaging 13.0 kicks, 7.7 handballs, 5.7 marks, 3.0 tackles, 11.7 contested possessions and 2.0 goals per game and won All-Australian honours as NSW/ACT's MVP. Steele was alsoselected on the interchange in the 2014 Under 18 All-Australian team. At the 2014 AFL Draft combine Steele performed well, having three top 10 results – finishing equal ninth in the kicking test, 3 km time-trial and beep test.

Canberra-raised AFL footballers were uncommon at the time of Steele's drafting, with Jason Tutt (2009) the most recent Canberran to be drafted in the AFL. At one point, Steele, Belconnen teammate Logan Austin as well as Josh Bruce, all from Canberra, were playing together at St Kilda (2018) with Steele reflecting that "it's funny, we always make jokes about Canberra and stuff with each other that only the three of us would understand. It's still pretty weird to think that we're probably [close to] the only three Canberra blokes in the AFL and we're all on the same side."

== AFL career ==
=== Greater Western Sydney (2015–2016) ===
Steele was drafted by Greater Western Sydney as an academy player (their first ever) with pick 24 overall in the 2014 AFL draft after the North Melbourne Football Club unsuccessfully bid for him with their first round pick listed as 16 overall. Steele coincidentally made his debut against North Melbourne in round 12 of the 2015 season and impressed with 17 disposals and 10 tackles. Steele played seven AFL games in his debut season at the Giants including six consecutive games from Round 12 to Round 18, and played a further 11 with their NEAFL side where he was in their best players eight times. His best game for the year would be against his future side St Kilda in Round 15 where he collected 20 touches, 3 marks, 6 tackles and 1 goal.

Steele commenced 2016 in the seniors and had 11 disposals and kicked one goal against Melbourne in Round 1. Steele was omitted for Round 2 but his time in the NEAFL was short-lived, being recalled to the senior side in Round 4. In five AFL games from Round 4 to Round 8 rotating between the midfield and the forward line Steele averaged 18 disposals and a goal per game with the Giants recording five consecutive victories. Steele only playing four AFL games from Round 9 to Round 17. After playing consecutive AFL games in Round 16 and Round 17 Steele missed Rounds 18 and 19 with a hand injury and was unable to regain his place in the Giants AFL team. The Giants midfield was stacked with talent including Callan Ward, Stephen Coniglio, Dylan Shiel, Adam Treloar, Ryan Griffen, Josh Kelly, Lachie Whitfield and Tom Scully whilst Toby Greene and Devon Smith supported as forwards who rotated through the midfield. This made it very difficult for younger mids like Steele to get selected and gain AFL experience.

=== St Kilda (2017–2025) ===
==== First season at St Kilda (2017) ====
At the conclusion of the 2016 season, Steele requested a trade from Greater Western Sydney and nominated St Kilda as his preferred destination. He was traded to St Kilda in exchange for the club's future 2017 second round draft pick (used to select Brent Daniels). Of the trade, Saints Chief Operating Officer Ameet Bains stated that "Jack’s a tough, big-bodied midfielder that will complement the mix we’ve got in there already and offer some high quality support to players like Jack Steven and David Armitage...Although Jack was a Giants academy player, we followed him closely in his draft year and have monitored his progress ever since, particularly in the last 12 months when we identified the potential for him to move clubs in search of opportunity." Bains also stipulated that "Jack had a number of options, but he was really keen to come to our club. He sees an opportunity to play regular senior football at St Kilda and was attracted to us because he sees a club that is building the right way." Steele himself cited opportunity at AFL-level as the driving factor for requesting a trade; "I really wanted to be playing consistent AFL footy, and at the Giants and with their list and the players they had it was just too hard to crack, if you did play one bad game I suppose you felt like your spot was in a bit of jeopardy, I didn’t really want that stress. I did want to stay there and be a one club player and try and win a premiership with that team but at the end of the day I wasn’t playing AFL footy so I think coming to St Kilda was the best thing I have done."

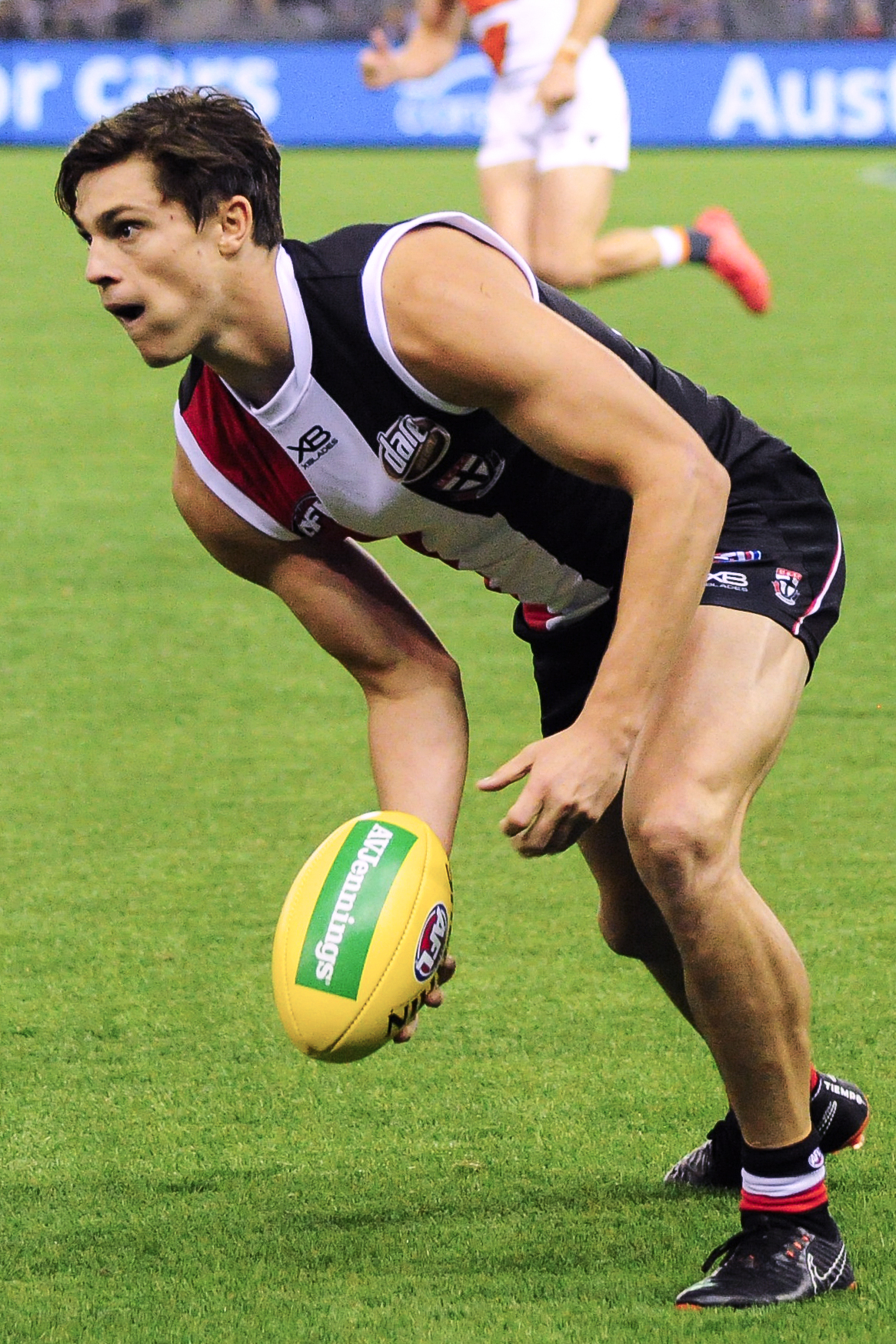
Steele playing for St Kilda in 2018

Steele made his debut for St Kilda Football Club in Round 1 of the 2017 season against the Melbourne Football Club, and set a new personal best of 23 disposals in a game consisting of eight kicks and 15 handballs, he also had 12 contested possessions and took seven marks. Steele played 11 consecutive AFL games for St Kilda in the first half of the 2017 season, and had more than 17 disposals nine times and laid at least eight tackles in a game eight times during this period. Steele was omitted for two games due to form, but was recalled in Round 15 and laid 17 tackles to equal the Saints club record for most tackles in a game set by David Armitage. He ultimately played the last nine matches of the season. Steele successfully completed 158 tackles in 20 games for St Kilda in 2017, the second best season tackle total in club history at the highest average per game (in the top 20) at 7.9 per game. He also equaled the club record for tackles in a game with 17 against Fremantle in round 15. This led to Steele winning the "Lenny Hayes Player Trademark award" for 2017, although he finished 18th in the club's best and fairest, the Trevor Barker Award.

==== 2018 ====
Belconnen Magpies teammate and close friend Logan Austin was traded to the Saints ahead of the 2018 season, and the two played seven games together that year. After a slow start to the 2018 season with a rib injury and some inconsistent form, St Kilda coach Alan Richardson picked Steele to perform a “run-with” or tagger role for the team. At 22 years of age Steele played his 50th AFL game in Round 15 against Melbourne at the MCG, tagging Clayton Oliver. Against Patrick Cripps in Round 17, Steele had 33 disposals and a phenomenal disposal efficiency of 97%, while also having a game-high 10 tackles, a team-high seven clearances, a team-high 15 contested possessions, a goal assist and kicked a goal. Steele excelled in the tagging role and had a standout second half of the season where he again won the "Lenny Hayes Player Trademark award" for the second year in a row and polled third in the Trevor Barker Award with 134 votes behind fellow midfielders Jack Steven (191 votes) and Sebastian Ross (175). Steele was ranked sixth in the AFL for tackles in 2018, and played 21 of a possible 22 games.

==== 2019 ====
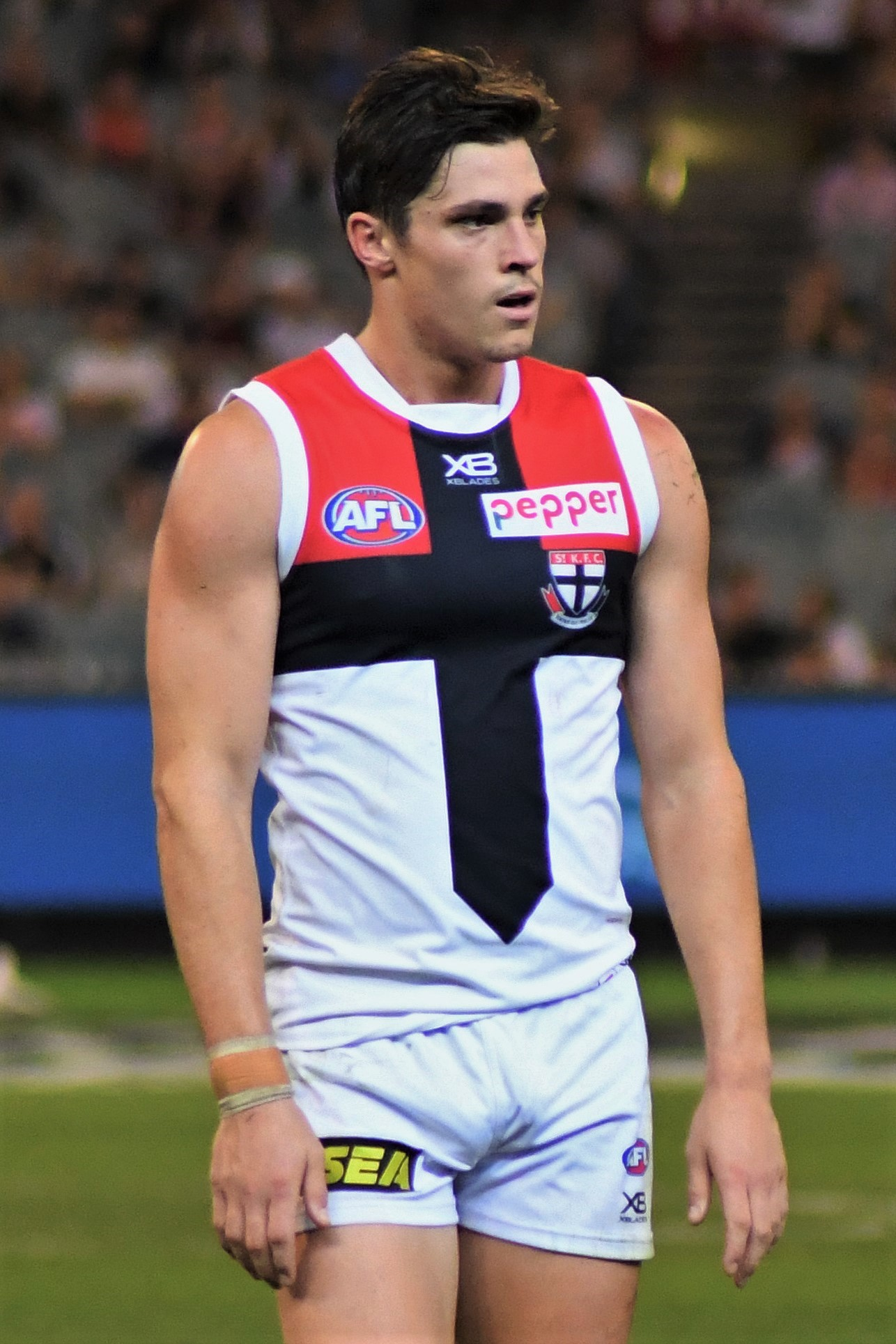
Steele with St Kilda in 2019

Steele continued his tagging role in 2019, missing only two games due to injury and not playing a game at reserves level for the first time since becoming an AFL-listed player. In round 16, Steele gathered a game high and club record 18 tackles, while tagging North Melbourne midfield star Ben Cunnington. Steele again finished third in the Trevor Barker award, making headlines for his tagging. Despite the run-with role, he averaged an impressive 21.9 disposals, 8.2 tackles and 4.2 clearances a game.

==== 2020 ====
The 2020 season was a breakout for Steele who transitioned from a tagger to an attacking midfielder and received a wide-range of accolades for a fine season. Steele finished equal third (with Melbourne's Christian Petracca) in the prestigious AFL Brownlow Medal after polling votes in nine games and earning best on ground in the matches against Carlton, Adelaide, Port Adelaide and Gold Coast. Steele also won the 2020 Trevor Barker Award, the St Kilda Best and Fairest award, for the first time in his career. Steele was selected on the interchange for the 2020 All-Australian side. Steele lead the Saints’ numbers for disposals (376), clearances (90), tackles (94), inside-50s (54) and ground-ball gets (117), plus in excess of 100 more pressure acts than second-placed Dan Butler. Steele finished fifth in the AFL Most Valuable Player Award behind fellow midfielders Lachie Neale, Travis Boak, Christian Petracca and key forward Tom Hawkins. Steele polled 72 votes to finish fourth in the AFL Coaches Association Player of the Year Award behind Lachie Neale (93), Christian Petracca (78) and Travis Boak (77), with Collingwood midfielder Taylor Adams (60) finishing fifth.

==== Co-captaincy (2021–2025) ====
Ahead of the 2021 AFL season, Steele was named co-captain of St Kilda alongside incumbent skipper Jarryn Geary. The honour was all the more significant as Steele had not been part of the leadership group in 2020, although he began to sit in on meetings in the second half of that season. An introvert, Steele did not initially see himself as an AFL captain. However, he was encouraged by Saints' captain Geary to take up a leadership role at the club: “I never thought about [being captain], just because of how quiet I am...He (Geary) said: ‘it’s OK to be different. He always showed a lot of faith in me, not just in my leadership but in my ability. For a lot of my career, I have had belief issues in myself. He’s been one constant person and teammate that’s believed in me since I got to the club.”

Steele played his 100th AFL match in Round 3 against Essendon and amassed an equal career-high 35 disposals in his milestone game.

Despite the Saints not reaching the heights of the previous season, Steele had a sensational year. Steele averaged a career-best 29 disposals, 14 contested possessions, eight tackles and six clearances for the season and topped the club in all key statistical metrics. Steele also had the highest number of tackles in the year (185, just one short of the all-time record) and placed in the league's top-10 for total contested possessions (fourth), pressure acts (fifth), clearances (eighth) and disposals (tenth). Steele had less than 25 disposals only four times for the year, while he had 30 disposals or greater in 10 games, including a season-high 37 disposals against Port Adelaide in prolific game in Round 18 where he also had eight marks, seven tackles, four clearances and kicked a goal. Steele collected a whopping 14 tackles twice, against Collingwood in round 16 and Carlton in Round 20, also collecting 36 disposals in both games.

For his impressive 2021 season, Steele earned a number of awards including his second consecutive Trevor Barker Award (securing 234 votes, 79 votes ahead of second place) All-Australian selection and the AFL Players' Association Most Courageous Player Award.

After the 2025 season, Steele told St Kilda of his desire to step down as captain, "At his recent year-end exit interview Jack Steele advised the club of his desire to step down from the captaincy," a St Kilda club statement read. Despite Steele's preference of remaining at St Kilda for the remainder of his two-year contract, St Kilda officials told him on that they were open to him facilitating a trade to another club.

=== Melbourne (2026–present) ===
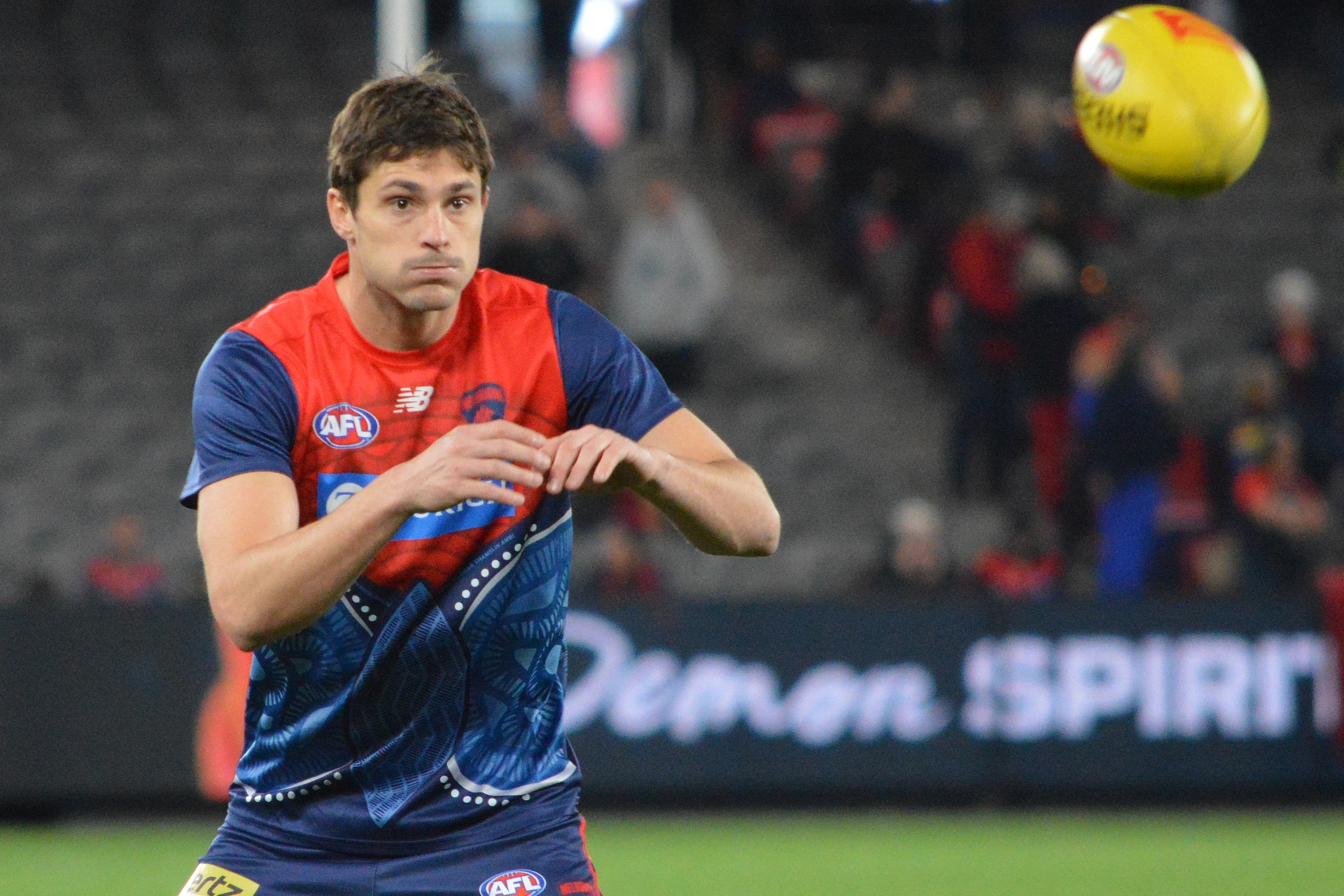
Steele pre-match with Melbourne in 2026

On trade deadline day, Steele was traded to Melbourne in exchange for a 2027 third-round draft selection. Melbourne list manager Tim Lamb said Steele was an exciting addition to the club's playing personnel. "We're incredibly excited to welcome a player of Jack's character, calibre and experience to the Dees," Lamb said. Steele debuted from his third club in round 1 of the 2026 AFL season against St Kilda. Against his former teammates, Steele had 21 disposals and kicked his first goal for the red and blue as they journeyed to become 13 point victors.

== Statistics ==
Updated to the end of round 22, 2026.

Legend
G	Goals	K	Kicks	D	Disposals	T	Tackles
B	Behinds	H	Handballs	M	Marks
†	Led the league for the season

Season	Team	No.	Games	Totals							Averages (per game)							Votes
Season	Team	No.	Games	G	B	K	H	D	M	T	G	B	K	H	D	M	T	Votes
2015	Greater Western Sydney	38	7	1	2	30	69	99	16	40	0.1	0.3	4.3	9.9	14.1	2.3	5.7	0
2016	Greater Western Sydney	11	10	8	2	81	74	155	41	41	0.8	0.2	8.1	7.4	15.5	4.1	4.1	0
2017	St Kilda	9	20	6	8	152	289	441	65	158	0.3	0.4	7.6	14.5	22.1	3.3	7.9	3
2018	St Kilda	9	21	7	2	207	286	493	83	140	0.3	0.1	9.9	13.6	23.5	4.0	6.7	1
2019	St Kilda	9	20	3	6	195	243	438	80	164	0.2	0.3	9.8	12.2	21.9	4.0	8.2^{†}	1
2020 (Note: The 2020 season was played with 17 home-and-away matches per team (down from 22) and 16-minute quarters with time on (down from 20-minute quarters with time on) due to the impact of the COVID-19 pandemic.)	St Kilda	9	19	11	2	204	213	417	72	104	0.6	0.1	10.7	11.2	21.9	3.8	5.5	20
2021	St Kilda	9	22	13	8	311	331	642	103	186	0.6	0.4	14.1	15.0	29.2	4.7	8.5	26
2022	St Kilda	9	18	5	5	227	261	488	90	129	0.3	0.3	12.6	14.5	27.1	5.0	7.2	13
2023	St Kilda	9	21	4	3	227	272	499	86	150	0.2	0.1	10.8	13.0	23.8	4.1	7.1	15
2024	St Kilda	9	23	8	4	259	298	557	131	169	0.3	0.2	11.3	13.0	24.2	5.7	7.3	9
2025	St Kilda	9	21	4	3	177	261	438	87	183	0.2	0.1	8.4	12.4	20.9	4.1	8.7	2
2026	Melbourne	9	21	3	3	194	299	493	68	122	0.1	0.1	9.2	14.2	23.5	3.2	5.8	0
Career			223	73	48	2264	2896	5160	922	1586	0.3	0.2	10.2	13.0	23.1	4.1	7.1	90

== Honours and achievements ==
- St Kilda co-captain: 2021; captain: 2022–2025
- 2× All-Australian team: 2020, 2021
- 2× Trevor Barker Award: 2020, 2021
- Robert Rose Award: 2021
