= St Kilda Football Club (AFL Women's) =

Australian rules football club

Names
- Full name: St Kilda Football Club Limited
- Nickname(s): Saints, Sainters
- Motto: Fortius Quo Fidelius ("Strength Through Loyalty")
- Club song: "When The Saints Go Marching In"

2025 season
- After finals: 7th
- Home-and-away season: 7th
- Leading goalkicker: Jesse Wardlaw (14 goals)
- Best and fairest: Tyanna Smith

Club details
- Founded: 2020
- Colours: Red White Black
- Competition: AFL Women's
- President: Andrew Bassat
- CEO: Carl Dilena
- Coach: Matthew Brewer
- Captain: Serene Watson
- Ground: RSEA Park (10,000)
- Training ground: Moorabbin Oval

Uniforms
Home	Away	Clash

Other information
- Official website: saints.com.au

The St Kilda Football Club, nicknamed the Saints, is an Australian rules football club based in Melbourne, Victoria. The club plays in the AFL Women's (AFLW), and is associated with the St Kilda men's team.

In September 2017, the club was granted a license by the AFL to compete in the league from the start of the 2020 season. The team plays its home games out of Moorabbin Oval, in Moorabbin, Victoria.

The club had a reserves affiliation with the Sandringham Football Club in the VFL Women's (VFLW) competition. A team known as the "Southern Saints" participated in the league between 2018 and 2024, originally being co-managed by both clubs before the license was taken over by Sandringham in 2020. Since 2025 the "Southern Saints" name has been dropped and the team's identity has been consolidated by the Sandringham Football Club.

== History ==
=== 2020–present: Foundation ===
On 18 February 2017, the Australian Football League (AFL) announced the creation of a women's competition the following year. St Kilda was one the first 13 clubs to apply for an inaugural license to join the competition. Despite being unsuccessful in its bid, it was granted a provisional license, meaning it would take preference over other bidders in subsequent bids. Following the successful completion of the inaugural AFLW season in 2017, the AFL launched a second round of bidding for licenses to enter the competition from 2019 onwards. St Kilda was again among eight clubs that applied. In September 2017, the club was announced as one of six clubs to receive a licence to join the competition, and as one of four to join in 2020.

== Players ==
=== Current AFLW squad ===
St Kilda Football Club · AFL Women's personnel
Playing list		Inactive list	Coaching staff
1 Molly McDonald; 2 Sophie Butterworth; 3 Alice Burke; 4 Jade McLay; 5 Darcy Guttridge; 6 Tyanna Smith (vc); 7 J'Noemi Anderson; 8 Carys D'Addario; 9 Jaimee Lambert; 10 Paige Trudgeon; 11 Zoe Besanko; 12 Serene Watson (c); 13 Maya Louvel-Finn; 14 Hannah Priest; 15 Kyla Forbes; 16 Ella Friend	17 Nicola Barr; 18 Saoirse Lally; 19 Rene Caris; 21 Georgia Patrikios; 22 Ashleigh Richards; 23 Olivia Vesely; 24 Alana Gee; 25 Amber Clarke; 26 Charlotte Baskaran; 27 Nicola Xenos; 30 Jesse Tawhiao-Wardlaw; 32 Abby Hobson; 35 Bianca Jakobsson; 36 Chelsea Sutton; 50 Emmelie Fiedler		Senior coach: Nick Dal Santo; Assistant coaches: Matt Skubis (back line); Matt Brewer (midfield); Jack Frost (forward line); Legend: (c) captain; (vc) vice-captain; Updated: 19 October 2026; Sources: Players, coaches

== Corporate ==
=== Administrative Board ===
- President: Andrew Bassat
- Vice-president: Russell Caplan
- Chief Executive Officer: Matt Finnis
- Director: Dean Anderson
- Director: Jennifer Douglas
- Director: Paul Kirk
- Director: Jack Rush
- Director: Danni Roche
- Director: Adam Hilton

== Club Honour Boards ==
=== Honour Boards ===
==== AFLW ====
St Kilda AFLW honour roll
Season	Ladder	W–L–D	Finals	Coach	Captain(s)	Best and fairest	Leading goalkicker	
2020	9th ^	2–4–0	DNQ	Peta Searle	Multiple (Note: 2020 co-captains were Cat Phillips, Kate Shierlaw & Rhiannon Watt.)	Four players (Note: 2020 best and fairest shared by Rosie Dillon, Caitlin Greiser, Georgia Patrikios, Olivia Vesely.)	Caitlin Greiser^{✪}	10
2021	11th	3–6–0	DNQ	Peta Searle	Multiple (Note: 2021 co-captains were Cat Phillips, Hannah Priest, Kate Shierlaw, Rhiannon Watt.)	Georgia Patrikios^{2}	Caitlin Greiser^{2}	9
2022 (S6)	13th	2–8–0	DNQ	Nick Dal Santo	Hannah Priest	Bianca Jakobsson	Nicola Xenos	6
2022 (S7)	13th	3–7–0	DNQ	Nick Dal Santo	Hannah Priest	Kate Shierlaw	Kate Shierlaw	13
2023	9th	6–4–0	DNQ	Nick Dal Santo	Hannah Priest	Jaimee Lambert	Nat Exon	9
2024	11th	4–7–0	DNQ	Nick Dal Santo	Hannah Priest	Jaimee Lambert^{2}	Jesse Wardlaw	14
2025	7th	7–5–0	0–1–0	Nick Dal Santo	Hannah Priest	Tyanna Smith	Jesse Wardlaw	14
^ = Ladder split into two conferences / ⚑ = Premier / ★ = Best And Fairest / ✪ = Leading Goalkicker / ^{2} = Multiple Best & Fairest or Leading Goal Kicker

== Records and statistics ==
Highest Score	11.10 (76) v West Coast, Round 9, 2021, Lathlain Park
Lowest Score	0.1 (1) v Western Bulldogs, Round 8, 2026, Eureka Stadium
Greatest Winning Margin	56 points v West Coast, Round 9, 2021, Lathlain Park
Greatest Losing Margin	92 points v North Melbourne, Round 4, 2026, Moorabbin Oval
Lowest Winning Score	2.6 (18) v Geelong 0.9 (9), Round 9, 2022 (S6), Moorabbin Oval
Highest Losing Score	7.6 (48) v Port Adelaide 8.8 (56), Round 3, 2023, Moorabbin Oval
Highest Crowd	8,000 v Western Bulldogs, Round 1, 2020, Moorabbin Oval

== Achievements ==
Club Best and Fairest
