= Darcy Guttridge =

Australian rules footballer

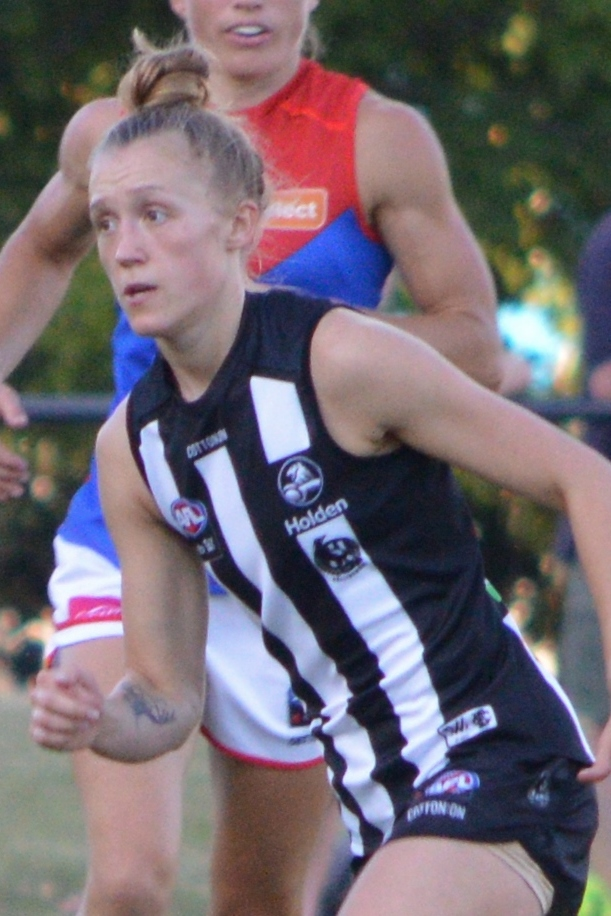
- Guttridge during a pre-season practice match for Collingwood in 2018

Personal information
- Full name: Darcy Guttridge
- Born: 30 October 1999 (age 27)
- Original team: Gippsland Power (TAC Cup)
- Draft: No. 9, 2017 AFL Women's draft
- Debut: Round 5, 2019, Collingwood vs. Carlton, at Ikon Park
- Height: 169 cm (5 ft 7 in)
- Position: Forward

Club information
- Current club: St Kilda

Playing career^{1}
Years	Club	Games (Goals)
2018–2019	Collingwood	3 (3)
2020–	St Kilda	40 (12)
Total		43 (15)
- ^{1} Playing statistics correct to the end of the 2023 season.

Darcy Guttridge (born 30 October 1999) is an Australian rules footballer playing for the St Kilda Football Club in the AFL Women's (AFLW).

== Career ==
She previously played for the Collingwood Football Club from 2018 to 2019. Guttridge was drafted by Collingwood with the club's second selection and the 9th pick overall in the 2018 AFL Women's draft. She made her debut in a loss to Carlton at Ikon Park in round 5 of the 2019 season. In April 2019, she departed the club and joined expansion side St Kilda. It was revealed Guttridge had signed on with the Saints for one more year on 30 June 2021, tying her to the club until the end of the 2021/2022 season.

== Personal life ==
Guttridge's partner Bianca Jakobsson also plays for AFLW club St Kilda.

Her father is Brett Guttridge.

== Statistics ==
Statistics are correct to the end of the 2019 season.

Legend
G	Goals	K	Kicks	D	Disposals	T	Tackles
B	Behinds	H	Handballs	M	Marks

Season	Team	No.	Games	Totals							Averages (per game)							Votes
Season	Team	No.	Games	G	B	K	H	D	M	T	G	B	K	H	D	M	T	Votes
2018	Collingwood	34	0	—	—	—	—	—	—	—	—	—	—	—	—	—	—	0
2019	Collingwood	34	3	3	1	9	14	23	2	3	1.0	0.3	3.0	4.7	7.7	0.7	1.0	0
Career			3	3	1	9	14	23	2	3	1.0	0.3	3.0	4.7	7.7	0.7	1.0	0
