= Kate Shierlaw =

Australian rules footballer

- Shierlaw playing for North Melbourne in 2026

Personal information
- Born: 28 February 1989 (age 37)
- Original team: Wimbledon (AFLB)
- Debut: Round 2, 2017, Carlton vs. Greater Western Sydney, at Ikon Park
- Height: 186 cm (6 ft 1 in)
- Position: Ruck / forward

Club information
- Current club: North Melbourne

Playing career^{1}
Years	Club	Games (Goals)
2017–2018	Carlton	10 (3)
2020–2022 (S7)	St Kilda	34 (24)
2023–	North Melbourne	24 (30)
Total		69 (57)
- ^{1} Playing statistics correct to the end of the 2024 season.

Career highlights
- 2x AFLW premiership player: 2024, 2025; St Kilda co-captain: 2020–2021; St Kilda leading goalkicker: 2022 (S7)

Kate Shierlaw (born 28 February 1989) is an Australian rules footballer who plays for North Melbourne in the AFL Women's competition (AFLW).

== Career ==
She was recruited by Carlton as a rookie player prior to the club's inaugural AFLW season in 2017. She made her debut in round 2, 2017, in a match against Greater Western Sydney at Ikon Park. Shierlaw did not miss a game from then on, finishing with six matches played in 2017. She was delisted by Carlton at the end of the 2018 season.

On 9 August 2019, St Kilda announced they had contracted Shierlaw for the 2020 season; they named her co-captain of the club in January 2020. It was revealed Shierlaw had signed on with the Saints for one more year on 30 June 2021, tying her to the club until the end of the 2021/2022 season.

In March 2023, Shierlaw was traded to North Melbourne as part of a three-club deal.

== Statistics ==
Statistics are correct to the end of the 2024 season.

Legend
G	Goals	K	Kicks	D	Disposals	T	Tackles
B	Behinds	H	Handballs	M	Marks	H/O	Hit-outs

Season	Team	No.	Games	Totals								Averages (per game)								Votes	
Season	Team	No.	Games	G	B	K	H	D	M	T	H/O	G	B	K	H	D	M	T	H/O	Votes	
2017	Carlton	12	6	2	1	19	10	29	11	5	7	0.3	0.2	3.2	1.7	4.8	1.8	0.8	1.2		
2018	Carlton	12	4	1	0	4	2	6	0	3	7	0.2	0.0	1.0	0.5	1.5	0.0	0.8	1.8		
2020	St Kilda	12	6	2	3	28	18	46	16	6	23	0.3	0.5	4.7	3.0	7.7	2.7	1.0	3.8		
2021	St Kilda	12	9	6	6	57	26	83	34	12	9	0.7	0.7	6.3	2.9	9.2	3.8	1.3	1.0		
2022 (S6)	St Kilda	12	9	3	7	46	22	68	29	14	17	0.3	0.8	5.1	2.4	7.6	3.2	1.6	1.9		
2022 (S7)	St Kilda	12	10	13	4	69	14	83	38	13	11	1.3	0.4	6.9	1.4	8.3	3.8	1.3	1.1		
2023	North Melbourne	12	12	12	10	79	34	113	44	21	0	1.0	0.8	6.6	2.8	9.4	3.7	1.8	0.0		
2024	North Melbourne	12	12	18	9	102	30	132	54	10	1	1.5	0.8	8.5	2.5	11.0	4.5	0.8	0.1		-
Career			68	57	40	404	156	560	226	184	75	0.8	0.6	5.9	2.3	8.2	3.3	1.2	1.1		
