= Jack Rush =

American screenwriter

Jack Rush (born February 3, 1966, in Philadelphia, Pennsylvania) is an American non-fiction writer, screenwriter, and actor, who has appeared in tv shows, films, and stage plays since the early 1980s. Since then he has resided in Los Angeles, California, and coached and directed actors in a variety of media. His most recent endeavor in aiding actors is a non-fiction work entitled The Actor's Rulebook: The Essential Guide to Your Acting Career, which has attracted thousands of viewers in communities such as myspace and other social networking websites.

It is believed that Jack Rush is the author's pseudonym, which has led to some speculation over his actual identity.
