= Molly McDonald =

Female Australian rules footballer

Personal information
- Full name: Molly McDonald
- Born: 4 May 2001 (age 25)
- Original team: Dandenong Stingrays (NAB League)
- Draft: Pre-list signing, 2019 national draft
- Debut: Round 1, 2020, St Kilda vs. Western Bulldogs, at RSEA Park
- Height: 167 cm (5 ft 6 in)
- Position: Winger

Club information
- Current club: St Kilda
- Number: 1

Playing career^{1}
Years	Club	Games (Goals)
2020–	St Kilda	38 (8)
- ^{1} Playing statistics correct to the end of the 2023 season.

Molly McDonald (born 4 May 2001) is an Australian rules footballer who plays for St Kilda in the AFL Women's (AFLW).
