= Bianca Jakobsson =

Australian rules footballer

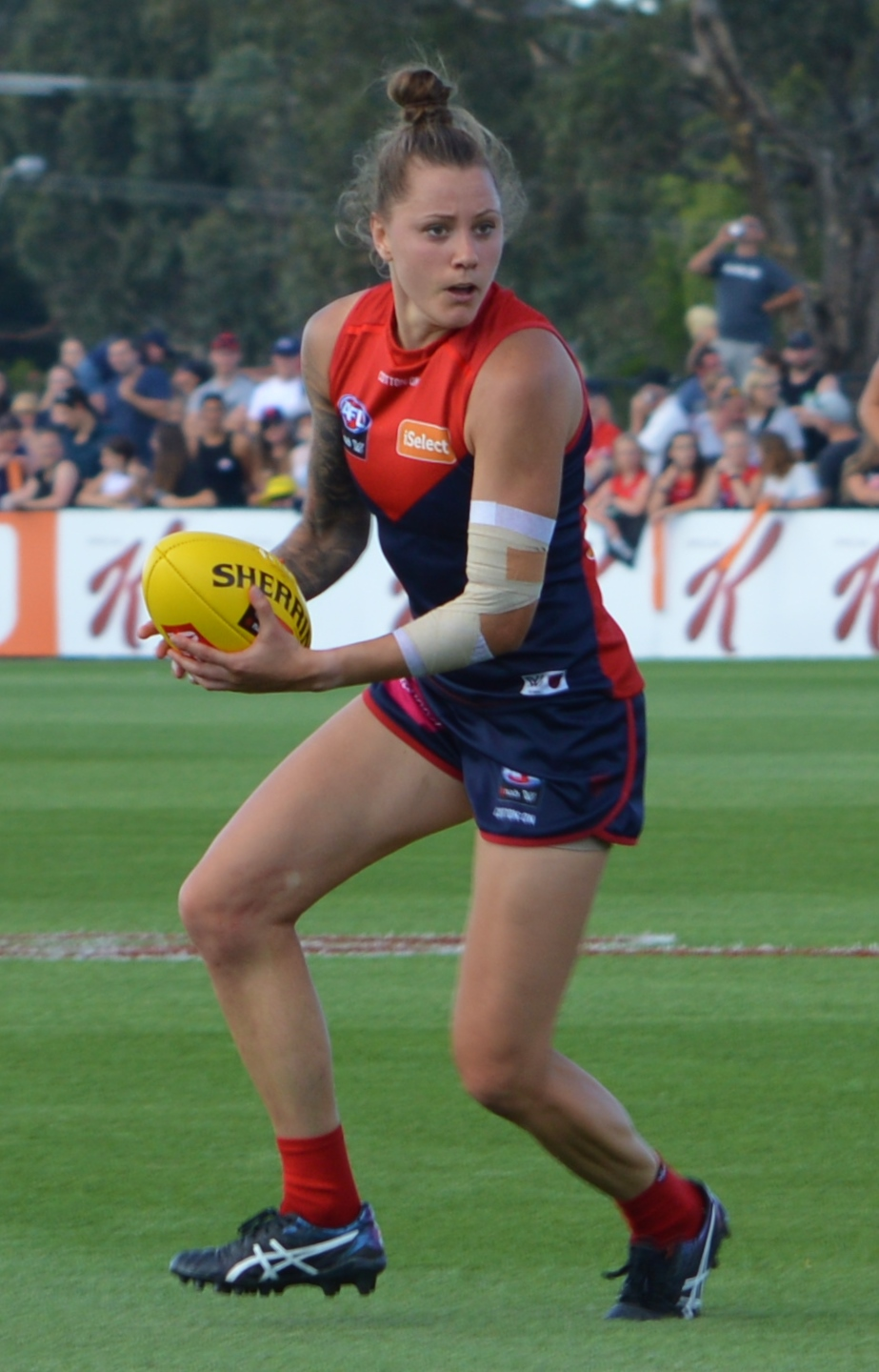
- Jakobsson with Melbourne in February 2018

Personal information
- Born: 30 March 1993 (age 33)
- Original team: Cranbourne (VFL Women's)
- Draft: No. 3, 2016 AFL Women's draft
- Debut: Round 1, 2017, Carlton vs. Collingwood, at Ikon Park
- Height: 174 cm (5 ft 9 in)
- Position: Forward, Defender

Club information
- Current club: St Kilda
- Number: 8

Playing career^{1}
Years	Club	Games (Goals)
2017	Carlton	7 (4)
2018–2020	Melbourne	13 (3)
2021–	St Kilda	37 (0)
Total		57 (7)

Representative team honours^{2}
Years	Team	Games (Goals)
2017	The Allies	1 (0)
- ^{1} Playing statistics correct to the end of the 2023 season.^{2} Representative statistics correct as of 2017.

Career highlights
- St Kilda best and fairest: 2022

Bianca Jakobsson (born 30 March 1993) is an Australian rules footballer playing for the St Kilda Football Club in the AFL Women's competition (AFLW). She previously played for Carlton and Melbourne.

== AFLW career ==
=== Carlton ===
Jakobsson was drafted by Carlton with the club's first selection, the third overall in the 2016 AFL Women's draft. She made her debut in Round 1, 2017, in the club and the league's inaugural match at Ikon Park, against Collingwood. Jakobsson is of Swedish descent. She finished the 2017 season having played in all seven of her side's matches that year.

=== Melbourne ===
In May 2017, Jakobsson was traded to Melbourne in exchange for a second round pick (number 12 overall) in the forthcoming 2017 AFL Women's draft.

Jakobsson's partner Darcy Guttridge also plays for AFLW club St Kilda.

== Personal life ==
Jakobsson currently is studying for a Bachelor of Exercise and Sport Science at Deakin University.
