= Stewart Loewe =

Australian rules footballer, born 1968

Personal information
- Nickname: Buckets
- Born: 23 May 1968 (age 58)
- Original team: Mount Eliza, Victoria
- Height: 194 cm (6 ft 4 in)
- Weight: 114 kg (251 lb)
- Position: Centre half forward

Playing career^{1}
Years	Club	Games (Goals)
1986–2002	St Kilda	331 (945)
- ^{1} Playing statistics correct to the end of 2002.

Career highlights
- 2× All-Australian: 1991, 1992; Trevor Barker Award: 1990; 2× St Kilda leading goalkicker: 1995, 1996; E. J. Whitten Medal: 1992; St Kilda Team of the Century

Stewart Loewe (born 23 May 1968) is a former Australian rules football player for the St Kilda Football Club.

Nicknamed "Buckets" for his big hands and the way he was able to mark the ball with ease, Loewe debuted in 1986 for the St Kilda Football Club after being recruited from Mount Eliza. He played junior football for P. & C. Junior Football Club based in Delacombe Park, Frankston, where his large size helped him excel in the position of ruckman, though he was also known for his poor kicking that would plague him throughout his AFL career.

At centre-half-forward, Loewe formed a lethal forward-line partnership with full-forward Tony Lockett. He had an awkward kicking style which sometimes resulted in missing easy shots, but his ability to kick long goals and consistent contested marking more than made up for it.

He went on to enjoy a great career, winning All-Australian selection in 1991 and 1992, winning the E. J. Whitten Medal in 1992 and co-captaining the side from 1996 to 1998.

Loewe played in St Kilda's 1996 AFL Ansett Australia Cup winning side.

Loewe played in 21 of 22 matches in the 1997 AFL premiership season home and away rounds in which St Kilda Football Club qualified in first position for the 1997 AFL Finals Series, winning the club's 2nd Minor Premiership and 1st McClelland Trophy. He retired in 2002, with 321 games, a record only surpassed at the Saints by Nathan Burke and Robert Harvey.

He was known to have been courted by other clubs during his career, most notably Fremantle on their introduction to the AFL, however he tells a less known story about the time Loewe nearly joined league heavyweights Essendon, before deciding to stay a one-club legend at St Kilda.

Loewe later played 68 games for Old Haileybury Amateur Football Club and played in the 2006 A Grade Premiership. He now coaches the senior team at Old Haileybury.
