= 2003 Brisbane Lions season =

Brisbane Lions
2003 season
- Coach: Leigh Matthews
- Captain: Michael Voss
- Home ground: The Gabba (Capacity: 37,600)
- AFL season: 3rd
- Finals series: Premiers
- Best and fairest: Michael Voss
- Leading goalkicker: Alastair Lynch (62 goals)
- Highest home attendance: 36,803 vs. Collingwood (17 April 2003)
- Lowest home attendance: 24,321 vs. Western Bulldogs (27 April 2003)
- Average home attendance: 31,717
- Club membership: 25,578

The Brisbane Lions' 2003 season was its seventh season in the Australian Football League (AFL). In it, the club won its third consecutive premiership, and third overall.

== Season summary ==
=== Premiership Season ===
==== Home and away season ====
Rd	Date and local time	Opponent	Scores		Venue	Attendance
Rd	Date and local time	Opponent	Brisbane	Opponent	Venue	Attendance
1	29 March (7:10 pm)	Essendon	104	61	The Gabba (H)	36,197
2	5 April (7:10 pm)	Port Adelaide	86	76	Football Park (A)	27,876
3	12 April (7:10 pm)	Kangaroos	109	109	Docklands Stadium (A)	24,359
4	17 April (7:40 pm)	Collingwood	95	81	The Gabba (H)	36,803
5	27 April (1:10 pm)	Western Bulldogs	106	79	The Gabba (H)	24,341
6	4 May (2:40 pm)	Geelong	92	78	Kardinia Park (A)	21,246
7	11 May (1:10 pm)	Sydney	79	98	SCG (A)	23,276
8	17 May (7:10 pm)	Adelaide	107	89	The Gabba (H)	34,469
9	24 May (2:10 pm)	Carlton	153	76	Princes Park (A)	24,906
10	31 May (7:10 pm)	Melbourne	123	63	The Gabba (A)	29,634
11	7 June (7:10 pm)	St Kilda	85	90	Docklands Stadium (A)	30,313
12	15 June (1:10 pm)	West Coast	91	160	The Gabba (H)	31,185
13	28 June (7:10 pm)	Richmond	104	61	The Gabba (H)	32,623
14	5 July (1:40 pm)	Fremantle	72	75	Subiaco Oval (A)	28,450
15	13 July (1:10 pm)	Hawthorn	93	81	The Gabba (H)	29,684
16	19 July (7:10 pm)	Essendon	86	94	Docklands Stadium (A)	47,744
17	26 July (7:10 pm)	Port Adelaide	103	104	The Gabba (H)	32,043
18	2 August (7:10 pm)	Kangaroos	137	83	The Gabba (H)	28,044
19	9 August (2:10 pm)	Collingwood	101	62	MCG (A)	61,868
20	17 August (1:10 pm)	Sydney	76	90	The Gabba (H)	32,988
21	23 August (7:10 pm)	Geelong	123	86	The Gabba (H)	30,515
22	30 August (7:10 pm)	Western Bulldogs	170	86	Docklands Stadium (A)	22,361

==== Finals series ====
Rd	Date and local time	Opponent	Scores		Venue	Attendance
Rd	Date and local time	Opponent	Brisbane	Opponent	Venue	Attendance
Second qualifying final	6 September (7:30 pm)	Collingwood	7.9 (51)	9.12 (66)	MCG	66,092
First semi-final	12 September (7:30 pm)	Adelaide	18.16 (124)	12.10 (82)	The Gabba	32,432
Second preliminary final	20 September (7:30 pm)	Sydney	14.16 (100)	8.8 (56)	Stadium Australia	71,019
Grand Final	27 September (2:30 pm)	Collingwood	20.14 (134)	12.12 (84)	MCG	79,451

===== Second qualifying final =====
Second qualifying final
Saturday, 6 September 7:30pm	Collingwood	def.	Brisbane Lions	MCG (crowd: 66,092)	Report
2.2 (14); 5.5 (35); 6.8 (44); 9.12 (66)	Q1; Q2; Q3; Final	3.2 (20); 6.5 (41); 7.5 (47); 7.9 (51)	Umpires: Allen, Goldspink, McBurney; Television broadcast: Network Ten
Tarrant 3 Didak, Buckley 2 Rocca, Johnson 1	Goals	3 Lynch; 1 McGrath, Akermanis, Brown, Lappin
Buckley, Clement, Tarrant, Fraser, Johnson, Cloke, Scotland	Best	Brown, Akermanis, Lappin, Michael, White, Hart
Nil	Injuries
Nil	Reports	Notting reported for charging Scotland

===== Second semi final =====
Second semi final
Friday, 12 September 7:30pm	Brisbane Lions	def.	Adelaide	The Gabba (crowd: 32,432)	Report
3.3 (21); 6.9 (45); 11.12 (78); 18.16 (124)	Q1; Q2; Q3; Final	3.2 (20); 4.4 (28); 10.7 (67); 12.10 (82)	Umpires: McBurney, Rosebury, Allen; Television broadcast: Network Ten
Lynch 6 Brown 3 Akermanis 2 McGrath, Lappin, Black, Power, Johnson, McRae, Copeland 1	Goals	4 Burton, Stevens; 2 McLeod; 1 Shirley, Bode
Lynch, Black, Akermanis, Leppitsch, Voss, Power	Best	Burton, Ricciuto, Goodwin, McLeod, Smart, Stevens
Ashcroft (knee)	Injuries	Nil
Nil	Reports	Nil

===== First preliminary final =====
First preliminary final
Saturday, 20 September 7:30pm	Sydney	def. by	Brisbane Lions	Telstra Stadium (crowd: 71,019)	Report
2.2 (14); 4.4 (28); 8.7 (55); 8.8 (56)	Q1; Q2; Q3; Final	2.7 (19); 6.7 (43); 8.10 (58); 14.16 (100)	Umpires: James, McLaren, Goldspink; Television broadcast: Network Ten
Hall 2 Davis, Cresswell, Williams, Kennelly, Ablett, Roberts-Thomson 1	Goals	3 Lynch, Pike; 2 Caracella, McGrath, Brown; 1 McRae, Black
Matthews, Hall, Williams, C. Bolton, Goodes	Best	Lappin, Charman, Caracella, Pike, Brown, Black
Nil	Injuries	Lappin (ribs)
Nil	Reports	Nil

===== Grand Final =====
Scorecard
Saturday, 27 September 2:40pm	Brisbane Lions	def.	Collingwood	MCG (crowd: 79,451)	Report
5.5 (35); 11.7 (73); 14.12 (96); 20.14 (134)	Q1; Q2; Q3; Final	3.3 (21); 4.7 (31); 9.7 (61); 12.12 (84)	Umpires: McBurney, Kennedy, Allen; Norm Smith Medal: Simon Black (Brisbane Lions); Television broadcast: Network Ten; National anthem: Christine Anu
Akermanis 5 Lynch 4 Caracella, Brown 2 McRae, Pike, Hadley, Black, Leppitsch, Hart, Bradshaw 1	Goals	3 Didak; 2 Burns; 1 Davis, Woewodin, Buckley, Licuria, Tarrant, Fraser, Scotland
Black, Akermanis, Voss, Lappin, Hart, Michael, Pike, Power	Best	Fraser, Burns, Buckley, Johnson, Licuria
Nil	Injuries	Nil
Nil	Reports	Nil

== Ladder ==
2003 AFL ladder
Pos	Team	Pld	W	L	D	PF	PA	PP	Pts	
1	Port Adelaide	22	18	4	0	2229	1752	127.2	72	Finals series
2	Collingwood	22	15	7	0	2259	1858	121.6	60	Finals series
3	Brisbane Lions (P)	22	14	7	1	2295	1882	121.9	58	Finals series
4	Sydney	22	14	8	0	2142	1862	115.0	56	Finals series
5	Fremantle	22	14	8	0	2143	2078	103.1	56	Finals series
6	Adelaide	22	13	9	0	2114	1754	120.5	52	Finals series
7	West Coast	22	12	8	2	2326	1982	117.4	52	Finals series
8	Essendon	22	13	9	0	2190	1960	111.7	52	Finals series
9	Hawthorn	22	12	10	0	2011	1999	100.6	48	
10	Kangaroos	22	11	10	1	2185	2223	98.3	46	
11	St Kilda	22	11	11	0	2095	2187	95.8	44	
12	Geelong	22	7	14	1	1819	2025	89.8	30	
13	Richmond	22	7	15	0	1846	2078	88.8	28	
14	Melbourne	22	5	17	0	1899	2344	81.0	20	
15	Carlton	22	4	18	0	1784	2674	66.7	16	
16	Western Bulldogs	22	3	18	1	2014	2693	74.8	14	

Source: AFL ladder
Rules for classification: 1) points; 2) percentage; 3) number of points for.
(P) Premiers
