= 2009 AFL finals series =

Finals matches of the 2009 Australian Football League

2009 AFL premiership season
- Date: 4–26 September 2009
- Teams: 8
- Premiers: Geelong; 8th premiership
- Runners-up: St Kilda (6th grand final)
- Minor premiers: St Kilda; 3rd minor premiership

Attendance
- Matches played: 9
- Total attendance: 615,283 (68,365 per match)
- Highest: 99,251 (Grand Final, St Kilda vs. Geelong)

The Australian Football League's 2009 finals series determined the top eight final positions of the 2009 AFL season over four weekends in September 2009, culminating with the 113th AFL/VFL Grand Final at the Melbourne Cricket Ground on 26 September 2009. Geelong won the AFL premiership, for the second time in three years, following their twelve-point win over St Kilda in the grand final.

== The finals system ==
The system is a final eight system. This system is different from the McIntyre final eight system, which was previously used by the AFL, and is currently used by the National Rugby League.

The top four teams in the eight receive what is popularly known as the "double chance" when they play in week-one qualifying finals. This means that even if a top-four team loses in the first week, it still remains in the finals, playing a semi-final the next week against the winner of an elimination final. The bottom four of the eight play knock-out games, in that only the winners survive and move on to the next week. Home-state advantage goes to the team with the higher seed in the first two weeks, to the qualifying final winners in the third week. Games in Victoria are played at the MCG, regardless of the team's usual home ground.

In the second week, the winners of the qualifying finals receive a bye to the third week. The losers of the qualifying final plays the elimination finals winners in a semi-final. In the third week, the winners of the semi-finals from week two play the winners of the qualifying finals in the first week. The winners of those matches move on to the Grand Final at the Melbourne Cricket Ground in Melbourne.

== Qualification ==
2009 AFL ladder
Pos	Team	Pld	W	L	D	PF	PA	PP	Pts	
1	St Kilda	22	20	2	0	2197	1411	155.7	80	Finals series
2	Geelong (P)	22	18	4	0	2312	1815	127.4	72	Finals series
3	Western Bulldogs	22	15	7	0	2378	1940	122.6	60	Finals series
4	Collingwood	22	15	7	0	2174	1778	122.3	60	Finals series
5	Adelaide	22	14	8	0	2104	1789	117.6	56	Finals series
6	Brisbane Lions	22	13	8	1	2017	1890	106.7	54	Finals series
7	Carlton	22	13	9	0	2270	2055	110.5	52	Finals series
8	Essendon	22	10	11	1	2080	2127	97.8	42	Finals series
9	Hawthorn	22	9	13	0	1962	2120	92.5	36	
10	Port Adelaide	22	9	13	0	1990	2244	88.7	36	
11	West Coast	22	8	14	0	1893	2029	93.3	32	
12	Sydney	22	8	14	0	1888	2027	93.1	32	
13	North Melbourne	22	7	14	1	1680	2015	83.4	30	
14	Fremantle	22	6	16	0	1747	2259	77.3	24	
15	Richmond	22	5	16	1	1774	2388	74.3	22	
16	Melbourne	22	4	18	0	1706	2285	74.7	16	

Source: AFL ladder
Rules for classification: 1) points; 2) percentage; 3) number of points for.
(P) Premiers

While both St Kilda and Geelong were undefeated until a round 14 match-up, and the Saints threat of an undefeated season only broken after 19 wins, both teams dropped matches late in the home-and-away season. Collingwood finished strongly, winning 12 of its last 14 matches.

== Summary of results ==
Qualifying and elimination finals
6 Sep, MCG
1	St Kilda	12.8 (80)
4	Collingwood	7.10 (52)
4 Sep, AAMI Stadium
5	Adelaide	26.10 (166)
8	Essendon	10.10 (70)
5 Sep, The Gabba
6	Brisbane	16.15 (111)
7	Carlton	15.14 (104)
5 Sep, MCG
2	Geelong	14.12 (96)
3	W Bulldogs	12.10 (82)

Semi-finals
12 Sep, MCG
Collingwood	12.11 (83)
Adelaide	11.12 (78)
11 Sep, MCG
W Bulldogs	16.11 (107)
Brisbane	8.8 (56)

Preliminary finals
18 Sep, MCG
St Kilda	9.6 (60)
W Bulldogs	7.11 (53)
19 Sep, MCG
Geelong	17.18 (120)
Collingwood	6.11 (47)

Grand final
26 Sep, MCG
St Kilda	9.14 (68)
Geelong	12.8 (80)

== Week one ==
=== First qualifying final (St Kilda vs. Collingwood) ===
First qualifying final
6 September, 2:40pm	St Kilda	def.	Collingwood	MCG (crowd: 84,213)
1.2 (8); 6.4 (40); 9.7 (61); 12.8 (80)	Q1; Q2; Q3; Final	2.4 (16); 4.6 (30); 6.8 (44); 7.10 (52)	Umpires: Brett Rosebury, Ray Chamberlain, Shane McInerney
Riewoldt 5, Koschitzke 2, McQualter 2, Goddard, Schneider, Milne	Goals	Rocca 2, Thomas 2, Anthony, Davis, Medhurst
Riewoldt, McQualter, Fisher, Hayes, Goddard, Montagna, Jones, Gram	Best	Cloke, Thomas, Shaw, Maxwell, O'Brien, Swan
Nil	Injuries	Scott Pendlebury (suspected broken leg), Anthony Rocca (ankle)
Nil	Reports	Nil
Collingwood started impressively in the first quarter with six scoring shots to three, to lead 2.4 (16) to 1.2 (8). St Kilda dominated the second quarter, scoring 5.2 to 2.2 to lead by 10 points at halftime. St Kilda kicked six goals to three in the second half to win by 28 points. Nick Riewoldt was the leading goal-kicker for St Kilda 5 goals. Anthony Rocca kicked two goals for Collingwood, but rolled an ankle with less than three minutes remaining. St Kilda progressed directly to the Preliminary Final, where it faced the Western Bulldogs in the First Preliminary Final. Collingwood progressed to the Semi-Final, where it faced Adelaide.

=== Second qualifying final (Geelong vs. Western Bulldogs) ===
Second qualifying final
5 September, 2:30pm	Geelong	def.	Western Bulldogs	MCG (crowd: 74,007)
6.5 (41); 7.5 (47); 13.9 (87); 14.12 (96)	Q1; Q2; Q3; Final	2.1 (13); 4.3 (27); 8.4 (52); 12.10 (82)	Umpires: Michael Vozzo, Simon Meredith, Hayden Kennedy
Bartel 3, Chapman 2, Mooney 2, Stokes 2, Enright, Ling, Mackie, Ottens, Taylor	Goals	Akermanis 3, Higgins 2, Johnson 2, Gilbee, Griffen, Hill, Hudson, Welsh
Scarlett, Enright, Milburn, Ablett, Bartel, Mackie	Best	Gilbee, Lake, Cross, Higgins, Boyd, Akermanis
Max Rooke (thigh) replaced in selected side by Simon Hogan	Injuries	Nil
Nil	Reports	Nil
Geelong dominated the first quarter and led by 28 points at quarter time. After quarter time the match was more even, and by three-quarter time, Geelong had extended its lead to only 35 points. The Bulldogs had a strong fight-back in the final quarter, but missed many shots on goal, finishing with 4.6 to 1.3 for the quarter. Geelong progressed to a Preliminary Final, which would be against Collingwood, and the Bulldogs progressed to a Semi-Final against Brisbane.

=== First elimination final (Adelaide vs. Essendon) ===
First elimination final
4 September, 7:45pm	Adelaide	def.	Essendon	AAMI Stadium (crowd: 50,393)
4.3 (27); 12.4 (76); 18.9 (117); 26.10 (166)	Q1; Q2; Q3; Final	3.3 (21); 5.7 (37); 8.8 (56); 10.10 (70)	Umpires: Stephen McBurney, Matt Stevic, Shaun Ryan
Porplyzia 5, Tippett 4, Knights 3, Burton 3, Dangerfield 2, Douglas 2, Vince, Edwards, Maric, Hentschel, Thompson, Mackay, Sellar	Goals	McPhee 4, Skipworth 2, Monfries, Quinn, Stanton, Lovett
Vince, McLeod, Doughty, Porplyzia, Tippett, Goodwin, Maric, Stevens	Best	McPhee, Welsh, Stanton, Lovett-Murray, Dyson
James Sellar (knock to head)	Injuries	Nil
Nil	Reports	Lovett-Murray (rough conduct), McVeigh (striking)
Essendon was playing in its first final since 2004. The first quarter was close, but Adelaide dominated the game from that point forward: eight goals to two in the second quarter, six goals to three in the third quarter, and eight goals to two in the final quarter. The final margin was 96 points. Adelaide progressed to a Semi-final against Collingwood; Essendon was eliminated.

=== Second elimination final (Brisbane vs. Carlton) ===
Second elimination final
5 September, 7:30pm	Brisbane Lions	def.	Carlton	The Gabba (crowd: 32,702)
4.4 (28); 8.7 (55); 10.10 (70); 16.15 (111)	Q1; Q2; Q3; Final	5.4 (34); 8.6 (54); 14.10 (94); 15.14 (104)	Umpires: Scott McLaren, Stuart Wenn, Scott Jeffery
Bradshaw 5, Brown 4, Johnstone 2, Sherman 2, Redden, Hooper, Rich	Goals	Fevola 3, Stevens 2, Cloke 2, Betts, Carrazzo, Garlett, Houlihan, Judd, Kreuzer, Murphy, Russell
Black, Bradshaw, Brown, Clark, Sherman, McGrath	Best	Judd, Fevola, Murphy, Kreuzer, Stevens, Carrazzo
Josh Drummond (quad), Joel Macdonald (TBA)	Injuries	Aaron Joseph (ankle)
Nil	Reports	Nil
Carlton was playing in its first final since 2001. After a close first half, Carlton opened a lead in the third quarter. After kicking the first goal of the final quarter, Carlton led by 30 points; but, Brisbane staged a strong comeback, kicking the last six goals of the game, to overrun Carlton and record a seven point win. Brisbane progressed to a Semi-final against the Bulldogs; Carlton was eliminated.

== Week two ==
=== First semi-final (Collingwood vs. Adelaide) ===
First semi-final
12 September, 7:30pm	Collingwood	def.	Adelaide	MCG (crowd: 62,184)
1.4 (10); 3.5 (23); 9.7 (61); 12.11 (83)	Q1; Q2; Q3; Final	6.3 (39); 7.7 (49); 7.9 (51); 11.12 (78)	Umpires: Brett Rosebury, Ray Chamberlain, Shane McInerney
Johnson 2, Dick 2, Lockyer, O'Brien, Wellingham, Swan, Cloke, Macaffer, Brown, Anthony	Goals	Tippett 4, Dangerfield 2, Thompson 2, Hentschel, Knights, Burton
Maxwell, Sidebottom, Shaw, Swan, Lockyer, Johnson, Wellingham, Macaffer	Best	Vince, Goodwin, Johncock, Edwards, Shirley, Tippett, Porplyzia
Nil	Injuries	Knights (left hamstring)
Nil	Reports	Nil.
Collingwood made five changes (four because of injuries) to the team that lost to St Kilda. Adelaide dominated the first quarter, kicking six goals to one, and partway into the second quarter, Adelaide's lead reached 32 points. However, the game became more defensive, and Collingwood won the second quarter two goals to one. In the third quarter, Collingwood dominated, kicking six goals to none, to lead by ten points. In the final quarter, Adelaide kicked the first three goals, before Collingwood's Brent Macaffer scored a goal and tied the game early in time-on. In the end, Collingwood's Jack Anthony kicked the game-winning goal from a controversial free kick with only fifteen seconds remaining. Collingwood progressed to the Preliminary Final against Geelong.

=== Second semi-final (Western Bulldogs vs. Brisbane) ===
Second semi-final
11 September, 7:45pm	Western Bulldogs	def.	Brisbane Lions	MCG (crowd: 47,030)
4.2 (26); 6.6 (42); 11.8 (74); 16.11 (107)	Q1; Q2; Q3; Final	0.6 (6); 3.7 (25); 5.7 (37); 8.8 (56)	Umpires: Matt Stevic, Shaun Ryan, Simon Meredith
Hahn 4, Eagleton 3, Ward 2, Higgins 2, Cooney, Akermanis, Gilbee, Griffen, Minson	Goals	Brown 3, Bradshaw 3, McGrath, Redden
Boyd, Cooney, Eagleton, Cross, Hargrave, Giansiracusa, Akermanis	Best	Power, Brown, Merrett, Brennan, Clark, Hawksley
Ryan Griffen (corked calf)	Injuries	Nil
Nil	Reports	Nil
After building a seventeen-point lead in the first half, the Western Bulldogs scored five goals to two in the third quarter to set up an unbeatable lead. The Bulldogs eventually won by 51 points to progress to the Preliminary Final against St Kilda.

== Week three ==
=== First preliminary final (St Kilda vs. Western Bulldogs) ===
First preliminary final
18 September, 7:40pm	St Kilda	def.	Western Bulldogs	MCG (crowd: 78,245)
0.2 (2); 3.6 (24); 7.6 (48); 9.6 (60)	Q1; Q2; Q3; Final	2.5 (17); 4.7 (31); 6.7 (43); 7.11 (53)	Umpires: Shane McInerney, Stephen McBurney, Ray Chamberlain
Riewoldt 4, Dal Santo, Fisher, Hayes, McQualter, Milne	Goals	Hahn 2, Johnson 2, Higgins, Giansiracusa, Picken
Riewoldt, Dal Santo, Hayes, Fisher, Jones, Goddard	Best	Griffen, Boyd, Johnson, Lake, Harbrow, Gilbee, Cooney
Nil	Injuries	Nil
Nil	Reports	Nil
This match was a low scoring, defensive struggle in cold, wet conditions. The Bulldogs kept St Kilda goalless in the first quarter, to lead by 15 points. Three goals to two in the second quarter saw St Kilda narrow the margin to seven points; then, with four goals to two in the third quarter, St Kilda took the lead by five points. The Bulldogs took back the lead with a goal early in the quarter, but with five scoring shots resulting in 1.4, did not build a lead; two late goals to St Kilda's captain Nick Riewoldt (who finished with four goals for the game) saw St Kilda regain and seal a seven point win. St Kilda progressed to the grand final for the first time since 1997.

=== Second preliminary final (Geelong vs. Collingwood) ===
Second preliminary final
19 September, 7:30pm	Geelong	def.	Collingwood	MCG (crowd: 87,258)
3.6 (24); 7.7 (49); 11.13 (79); 17.18 (120)	Q1; Q2; Q3; Final	2.2 (14); 5.8 (38); 6.9 (45); 6.11 (47)	Umpires: Shaun Ryan, Brett Rosebury, Scott McLaren
Chapman 5, Ablett 2, Byrnes 2, Hawkins 2, Varcoe 2, Corey, Johnson, Mooney, Ottens	Goals	Brown, Didak, Johnson, Lockyer, Macaffer, O'Brien
Ablett, Corey, Chapman, Ling, Scarlett, Bartel, Kelly, Varcoe	Best	O'Bree, Brown, Shaw, O'Brien
Nil	Injuries	Pendlebury (leg), replaced by Beams
Nil	Reports	Nil
For the second time in three years the Cats and Magpies would play off in the Preliminary Final. Collingwood started well, kicking 2.2 to nothing in the opening seven minutes; but Geelong then scored 3.6 to nothing for the rest of the quarter, and opened up a 24-point lead late in the second quarter. Two late goals to Collingwood narrowed the margin to 11 points at half time. Geelong then dominated the second half, kicking ten goals to one, ultimately winning by 73 points. Geelong progressed to its third consecutive grand final. Geelong would match that feat for the first time since 1951-1953 and the second time in the club's history.

== Week four ==
=== Grand Final (St Kilda vs. Geelong) ===
Grand Final
26 September, 2:30pm	St Kilda	def. by	Geelong	MCG (crowd: 99,251)
3.2 (20); 7.7 (49); 9.11 (65); 9.14 (68)	Q1; Q2; Q3; Final	3.0 (18); 7.1 (43); 9.4 (58); 12.8 (80)	Umpires: Stephen McBurney, Brett Rosebury, Shaun Ryan; Norm Smith Medal: Paul Chapman (Geelong)
Schneider 2, Goddard, Hayes, Dempster, Jones, Koschitzke, Riewoldt, Montagna	Goals	Chapman 3, Mooney 2, Hawkins 2, Rooke 2, Selwood, Byrnes, Ablett
Gram, Hayes, Ball, Jones, Montagna, Baker, Goddard	Best	Chapman, Rooke, Milburn, Taylor, Selwood, Ablett, Corey, Bartel, Ling, Scarlett
Goddard (broken nose/collarbone), Riewoldt (Torn adductor muscle)	Injuries	Paul Chapman (hamstring), Harry Taylor (broken hand)
Nil	Reports	Nil

== See also ==
- 2009 AFL season
