= 2004 Brisbane Lions season =

Brisbane Lions
2004 season
- Coach: Leigh Matthews
- Captain: Michael Voss
- Home ground: The Gabba (Capacity: 42,000)
- AFL season: 2nd
- Finals series: Runners-up
- Best and fairest: Nigel Lappin
- Leading goalkicker: Jason Akermanis (40 goals)
- Highest home attendance: 36,467 vs. Collingwood (8 April 2004)
- Lowest home attendance: 29,295 vs. Western Bulldogs (11 July 2004)
- Average home attendance: 33,619
- Club membership: 30,941

The Brisbane Lions' 2004 season was its eighth season in the Australian Football League (AFL).

== Season summary ==
=== Pre-season ===
==== First round ====
Round 1
Saturday, 22 February (1:10 pm)	Hawthorn	def. by	Brisbane Lions	York Park (crowd: 12,443)
0.0.1 (1); 0.0.5 (5); 0.2.9 (21); 0.4.16 (40)	Q1; Q2; Q3; Final	0.5.1 (31); 0.8.4 (52); 0.10.5 (65); 0.12.5 (77)	Television broadcast: Fox Footy Channel
Nil	Super Goals	Nil
Vandenberg, Barlow, Clarke, Lekkas 1	Goals	5 Brown; 2 Charman, Power; 1 Copeland, Akermanis, Notting
Smith, Hodge, Vandenberg, Beaumont, Miller	Best	Brown, Power, Charman, Pratt, Akermanis, Michael, Pike, Bradshaw

==== Quarter-finals ====
Quarter Final
Saturday, 28 February (7:40 pm)	Essendon	def.	Brisbane Lions	Telstra Dome (crowd: 19,120)
0.4.1 (25); 0.7.4 (46); 1.11.7 (82); 1.12.9 (90)	Q1; Q2; Q3; Final	0.3.4 (22); 1.4.9 (42); 2.5.10 (58); 2.8.13 (79)	Television broadcast: Network Ten
Lucas 1	Super Goals	1 Keating, Pratt
Lloyd 4 M. Johnson 3 Ramanauskas, Richards, Bolton, Hille, Murphy 1	Goals	3 Brennan; 2 Lynch; 1 Hadley, Bradshaw, McGrath
Hird, Lloyd, Lucas, M. Johnson, Misiti	Best	Lappin, Power, Hart, Akermanis, Notting

=== Premiership Season ===
==== Home and away season ====
Rd	Date and local time	Opponent	Scores		Venue	Attendance
Rd	Date and local time	Opponent	Brisbane	Opponent	Venue	Attendance
1	27 March (8:10 pm)	Sydney	80	78	The Gabba (H)	34,028
2	3 April (2:10 pm)	Adelaide	104	83	Football Park (A)	41,095
3	8 April (7:40 pm)	Collingwood	137	77	The Gabba (H)	36,467
4	17 April (2:10 pm)	West Coast	76	79	Subiaco Oval (A)	39,666
5	24 April (7:10 pm)	Hawthorn	110	62	The Gabba (H)	34,526
6	1 May (7:10 pm)	St Kilda	91	92	Docklands Stadium (A)	52,539
7	8 May (7:10 pm)	Kangaroos	120	76	Docklands Stadium (A)	27,511
8	15 May (7:10 pm)	Carlton	140	102	The Gabba (H)	34,368
9	22 May (2:10 pm)	Fremantle	78	137	Subiaco Oval (A)	32,575
10	30 May (1:10 pm)	Melbourne	123	83	The Gabba (A)	32,902
11	5 June (7:10 pm)	Port Adelaide	123	86	The Gabba (H)	34,241
12	12 June (7:10 pm)	Essendon	162	96	Docklands Stadium (A)	50,003
13	19 June (2:10 pm)	Geelong	65	92	Kardinia Park (A)	17,648
14	3 July (7:10 pm)	Richmond	114	96	The Gabba (H)	32,744
15	11 July (1:10 pm)	Western Bulldogs	136	68	The Gabba (H)	29,295
16	17 July (7:10 pm)	Collingwood	109	73	MCG (A)	34,326
17	24 July (7:10 pm)	Adelaide	189	48	The Gabba (H)	33,443
18	31 July (7:10 pm)	Sydney	51	83	SCG (A)	34,926
19	8 August (1:10 pm)	West Coast	73	87	The Gabba (H)	31,754
20	14 August (2:10 pm)	Hawthorn	66	43	MCG (A)	17,159
21	22 August (1:10 pm)	St Kilda	130	85	The Gabba (H)	35,823
22	28 August (7:10 pm)	Kangaroos	170	57	The Gabba (H)	33,122

===== Round 1 =====
Round 1
Saturday, 27 March (7:10 pm)	Brisbane Lions	def.	Sydney	The Gabba, Brisbane (crowd: 34,028)
1.3 (9); 5.6 (36); 8.12 (60); 11.14 (80)	Q1; Q2; Q3; Final	4.3 (27); 8.7 (55); 8.11 (59); 11.12 (78)	Umpires: McLaren, Nicholls, Ellis; Television broadcast: Network Ten
Pike 3 McRae 2 Brennan, Akermanis, Keating, Black, Leppitsch, Caracella 1	Goals	4 Davis; 1 McVeigh, Williams, Hall, Crouch, Goodes, Bolton, O'Loughlin

==== Finals series ====
Rd	Date and local time	Opponent	Scores		Venue	Attendance
Rd	Date and local time	Opponent	Brisbane	Opponent	Venue	Attendance
First qualifying final	3 September (7:30 pm)	St Kilda	149	69	The Gabba	33,582
Second preliminary final	18 September (7:30 pm)	Geelong	84	75	MCG	55,768
Grand Final	25 September (2:30 pm)	Port Adelaide	73	113	MCG	77,671

===== Second qualifying final =====
Second qualifying final
Friday, 3 September (7:30pm)	Brisbane Lions	def.	St Kilda	The Gabba, Brisbane (crowd: 33,582)
6.3 (39); 11.8 (74); 17.9 (111); 23.11 (149)	Q1; Q2; Q3; Final	3.2 (20); 4.4 (28); 6.6 (42); 10.9 (69)	Umpires: McBurney, McLaren, Woodcock; Television broadcast: Network Ten

===== Second preliminary final =====
Second preliminary final
Saturday, 18 September (7:30pm)	Brisbane Lions	def.	Geelong	MCG, Melbourne (crowd: 55,768)
3.3 (21); 6.4 (40); 9.10 (64); 12.12 (84)	Q1; Q2; Q3; Final	3.5 (23); 5.8 (38); 8.12 (60); 10.15 (75)	Umpires: James, Kennedy, Rowe; Television broadcast: Network Ten
Despite earning a home preliminary final by beating St Kilda two weeks earlier, the Brisbane Lions were forced to play Geelong in Melbourne at the MCG, due an agreement between the AFL and the MCG to play at least one match per week at the ground in finals. This contractual stipulation was removed following renegotiation the following season.

===== Grand Final =====
2004 AFL Grand Final
Saturday, 25 September 2:40pm	Port Adelaide	def.	Brisbane Lions	MCG, Melbourne (crowd: 77,671)
4.5 (29); 6.6 (42); 12.8 (80); 17.11 (113)	Q1; Q2; Q3; Final	2.2 (14); 6.7 (43); 9.9 (63); 10.13 (73)	Umpires: James, Allen, McInerney; Norm Smith Medal: Byron Pickett (Port Adelaide); Television broadcast: Network Ten; National anthem: Guy Sebastian
Wanganeen 4 Pickett, Thurstans 3 S. Burgoyne, Carr, Dew, Kingsley, Lade, Mahoney, Tredrea 1	Goals	3 Akermanis, Bradshaw, Notting; 1 Keating
Pickett, P. Burgoyne, Wanganeen, Thurstans, K. Cornes	Best	Akermanis, Notting, Lappin, Bradshaw
Wakelin – Attempting to strike and wrestling Lynch, Carr – 2 x wrestling	Reports	Lynch – Seven offences against Wakelin, Brown – Striking and wrestling Carr, Black – 2x striking
Brisbane won the toss and kicked to the city end first.; This was Port Adelaide's first premiership in the AFL since it joined the competition after having previously won 36 SANFL premierships.

== Ladder ==
2004 AFL ladder
Pos	Team	Pld	W	L	D	PF	PA	PP	Pts	
1	Port Adelaide (P)	22	17	5	0	2413	1823	132.4	68	Finals series
2	Brisbane Lions	22	16	6	0	2447	1783	137.2	64	Finals series
3	St Kilda	22	16	6	0	2443	1909	128.0	64	Finals series
4	Geelong	22	15	7	0	2088	1741	119.9	60	Finals series
5	Melbourne	22	14	8	0	2127	1900	111.9	56	Finals series
6	Sydney	22	13	9	0	1938	1804	107.4	52	Finals series
7	West Coast	22	13	9	0	2042	1968	103.8	52	Finals series
8	Essendon	22	12	10	0	2282	2228	102.4	48	Finals series
9	Fremantle	22	11	11	0	1882	1870	100.6	44	
10	Kangaroos	22	10	12	0	2142	2135	100.3	40	
11	Carlton	22	10	12	0	1825	2235	81.7	40	
12	Adelaide	22	8	14	0	1950	2039	95.6	32	
13	Collingwood	22	8	14	0	1899	2082	91.2	32	
14	Western Bulldogs	22	5	17	0	1957	2459	79.6	20	
15	Hawthorn	22	4	18	0	1668	2375	70.2	16	
16	Richmond	22	4	18	0	1693	2445	69.2	16	

Source: AFL ladder
Rules for classification: 1) points; 2) percentage; 3) number of points for.
(P) Premiers
