= 2006 AFL finals series =

2006 AFL premiership season
- Date: 8–30 September 2006
- Teams: 8
- Premiers: West Coast; 3rd premiership
- Runners-up: Sydney (14th grand final)
- Minor premiers: West Coast; 3rd minor premiership

Attendance
- Matches played: 9
- Total attendance: 532,178 (59,131 per match)
- Highest: 97,431 (Grand Final, Sydney vs. West Coast)

The Australian Football League's 2006 finals series took place between the teams that finished in the top eight in the 2006 AFL season. It began on the weekend of 8 September 2006 and ended with the 110th AFL Grand Final at the Melbourne Cricket Ground on 30 September 2006. The winner, West Coast Eagles, was crowned champion of the AFL after defeating Sydney by one point.

Eight teams qualified for the finals by finishing in the top eight of the premiership ladder.

With the top eight race effectively ending several rounds before the end of the season, the push for the final two positions in the top four heated up as all six teams below West Coast and Adelaide were vying for the crucial "double chance" with only a few rounds left. With wins in the final round, Fremantle and Sydney secured the "double chance" making it the first time in the game's history where the top four positions did not consist of a single Victorian team.

== Ladder ==
2006 AFL ladder
Pos	Team	Pld	W	L	D	PF	PA	PP	Pts	
1	West Coast (P)	22	17	5	0	2257	1874	120.4	68	Finals series
2	Adelaide	22	16	6	0	2331	1640	142.1	64	Finals series
3	Fremantle	22	15	7	0	2079	1893	109.8	60	Finals series
4	Sydney	22	14	8	0	2098	1630	128.7	56	Finals series
5	Collingwood	22	14	8	0	2345	1965	119.3	56	Finals series
6	St Kilda	22	14	8	0	2074	1752	118.4	56	Finals series
7	Melbourne	22	13	8	1	2146	1957	109.7	54	Finals series
8	Western Bulldogs	22	13	9	0	2311	2173	106.4	52	Finals series
9	Richmond	22	11	11	0	1934	2245	86.1	44	
10	Geelong	22	10	11	1	1982	2002	99.0	42	
11	Hawthorn	22	9	13	0	1834	2140	85.7	36	
12	Port Adelaide	22	8	14	0	1911	2151	88.8	32	
13	Brisbane Lions	22	7	15	0	1844	2239	82.4	28	
14	Kangaroos	22	7	15	0	1754	2167	80.9	28	
15	Essendon	22	3	18	1	2021	2469	81.9	14	
16	Carlton	22	3	18	1	1791	2415	74.2	14	

Source: AFL ladder
Rules for classification: 1) points; 2) percentage; 3) number of points for.
(P) Premiers

== Summary of results ==
Qualifying and elimination finals
Sep 9, Subiaco Oval
1	West Coast	12.12 (84)
4	Sydney	13.7 (85)
Sep 10, MCG
5	Collingwood	11.14 (80)
8	Western Bulldogs	18.13 (121)
Sep 8, MCG
6	St Kilda	10.12 (72)
7	Melbourne	13.12 (90)
Sep 9, AAMI Stadium
2	Adelaide	10.16 (76)
3	Fremantle	7.4 (46)

Semi-finals
Sep 16, Subiaco Oval
West Coast	16.17 (113)
Western Bulldogs	5.9 (39)
Sep 15, Subiaco Oval
Fremantle	14.18 (102)
Melbourne	11.8 (74)

Preliminary finals
Sep 22, Telstra Stadium
Sydney	19.13 (127)
Fremantle	14.8 (92)
Sep 23, AAMI Stadium
Adelaide	11.9 (75)
West Coast	11.19 (85)

Grand final
Sep 30, MCG
Sydney	12.12 (84)
West Coast	12.13 (85)

== The finals system ==
The system is a final eight system. This system is different from the McIntyre final eight system, which was previously used by the AFL.

The top four teams in the eight receive what is popularly known as the "double chance", meaning that they cannot be eliminated from the finals in the first week match, the qualifying final. In contrast the bottom four of the eight play elimination finals in the first week, where only the winners move on to week two.

In the second week, the winners of the qualifying finals receive a bye (rest), while qualifying finals losers play the winners of the elimination finals. Home ground advantage goes to the team with the higher final 8 position.

In the third week, the winners of the semi-finals play the winners of the qualifying finals in the first week, with the latter receiving home-ground advantage. The winners of those matches move on to the Grand Final at the Melbourne Cricket Ground.

== Week one ==
=== First qualifying final (West Coast vs. Sydney) ===
West Coast vs Sydney
Team	Q1	Q2	Q3	Final
West Coast	2.3 (15)	4.6 (30)	9.9 (63)	12.12 (84)
Sydney	3.2 (20)	7.3 (45)	10.6 (66)	13.7 (85)
Venue:		Subiaco Oval, Perth		
Date and time:		9 September 2006 – 5:30PM AWST		
Attendance:		43,116		
Umpires:		Vozzo, McBurney, Ryan		
Goal scorers:	West Coast	2: Lynch, Hunter, Waters, Judd; 1: Staker, Stenglein, Cousins, Armstrong		
Goal scorers:	Sydney	5: Hall; 4: O'Loughlin; 2: Schneider; 1: Kirk, Goodes		
Best:	West Coast	Judd, R. Jones, Selwood, Wirrpanda, Hunter, B. Jones, Cox		
Best:	Sydney	Hall, Kirk, McVeigh, O'Loughlin, O'Keefe, Richards, Goodes		
Reports:		West Coast: Chick (rough conduct, charge withdrawn by match review)		
Injuries:		West Coast: Chick (shin)		

=== Second qualifying final (Adelaide vs. Fremantle) ===
Adelaide vs Fremantle
Team	Q1	Q2	Q3	Final
Adelaide	1.3 (9)	3.8 (26)	5.12 (42)	10.16 (76)
Fremantle	4.2 (26)	5.2 (32)	7.4 (46)	7.4 (46)
Venue:		AAMI Stadium, Adelaide		
Date and time:		9 September 2006 – 2:30PM ACST		
Attendance:		42,208		
Umpires:		Chamberlain, Ellis, McInery		
Goal scorers:	Adelaide	2: Bock, Torney, Biglands; 1: Clarke, Reilly, Welsh, Perrie		
Goal scorers:	Fremantle	2: Pavlich, Farmer; 1: Crowley, Black, Cook		
Best:	Adelaide	Doughty, Reilly, Torney, Thompson, Edwards, Bassett, Stevens, Bock, Johncock, Bode		
Best:	Fremantle	Black, Bell, Johnson, J. Carr, McPharlin		
Reports:		—		
Injuries:		Fremantle: Grover (back)		

=== First elimination final (Collingwood vs. Western Bulldogs) ===
Collingwood vs Western Bulldogs
Team	Q1	Q2	Q3	Final
Collingwood	5.6 (36)	6.9 (45)	6.13 (49)	11.14 (80)
Western Bulldogs	4.2 (26)	8.7 (55)	14.10 (94)	18.13 (121)
Venue:		Melbourne Cricket Ground, Melbourne		
Date and time:		10 September 2006 – 2:30PM AEST		
Attendance:		84,284		
Umpires:		Kennedy, Allen, Jeffery		
Goal scorers:	Collingwood	3: Tarrant; 2: Holland; 1: Fraser, Egan, Rusling, Lockyer, Rocca, Licuria		
Goal scorers:	W. Bulldogs	4: Montgomery; 3: Cooney, Robbins; 2: Gilbee, Ray; 1: Johnson, Giansiracusa, Minson, Smith		
Best:	Collingwood	R. Shaw, Johnson, Clement, Fraser, H. Shaw, Buckley		
Best:	W. Bulldogs	West, Cross, Ray, Cooney, Morris, Montgomery, Johnson, Giansiracusa, Grant		
Reports:		Collingwood: Holland (charging, received six-week suspension)		
Injuries:		W. Bulldogs: Gilbee (ankle)		

=== Second elimination final (St Kilda vs. Melbourne) ===
St Kilda vs Melbourne
Team	Q1	Q2	Q3	Final
St Kilda	5.4 (34)	6.6 (42)	9.8 (62)	10.12 (72)
Melbourne	2.2 (14)	3.4 (22)	8.5 (53)	13.12 (90)
Venue:		Melbourne Cricket Ground, Melbourne		
Date and time:		8 September 2006 – 7:30PM AEST		
Attendance:		67,528		
Umpires:		Rosebury, Schmitt, Goldspink		
Goal scorers:	St Kilda	3: Gehrig; 2: Milne, Riewoldt; 1: Koschitzke, Peckett, Baker		
Goal scorers:	Melbourne	4: Neitz; 2: McLean; 1: Miller, McDonald, Bruce, Robertson, Pickett, Bate, Yze		
Best:	St Kilda	Riewoldt, Harvey, Baker, S. Fisher, Milne, Ball, Gehrig		
Best:	Melbourne	McLean, Neitz, Bruce, Green, McDonald, White, Carroll		
Reports:		St Kilda: A. Thompson (rough conduct, received reprimand)		
Injuries:		St Kilda: R. Clarke (hamstring), Gehrig (ankle), X. Clarke (back), Harvey (hamstring); Melbourne: Whelan (shoulder)		

== Week two ==
=== First semi-final (West Coast vs. Western Bulldogs) ===
West Coast Eagles vs Western Bulldogs
Team	Q1	Q2	Q3	Final
West Coast Eagles	4.3 (27)	8.7 (55)	9.12 (66)	16.17 (113)
Western Bulldogs	3.4 (22)	4.6 (30)	4.9 (33)	5.9 (39)
Venue:		Subiaco Oval, Perth		
Date and time:		16 September 2006 – 5:30PM AWST		
Attendance:		43,219		
Umpires:		Kennedy, Allen, Schmitt		
Goal scorers:	West Coast	6: Lynch; 4: Hunter; 1: Waters, Hansen, Judd, Embley, Cousins, Cox		
Goal scorers:	W. Bulldogs	3: Johnson; 1: Grant, Robbins		
Best:	West Coast	Hunter, Judd, Lynch, Hansen, Kerr, Chick, Cousins, Selwood, Butler		
Best:	W. Bulldogs	West, Johnson, Morris, Smith		
Reports:		W. Bulldogs: Harris (striking, received two-week suspension)		
Injuries:		West Coast: Wirrpanda (hamstring)		

=== Second semi-final (Fremantle vs. Melbourne) ===
Fremantle vs Melbourne
Team	Q1	Q2	Q3	Final
Fremantle	3.3 (21)	7.9 (51)	11.15 (81)	14.18 (102)
Melbourne	3.0 (18)	7.3 (45)	10.4 (64)	11.8 (74)
Venue:		Subiaco Oval, Perth		
Date and time:		15 September 2006 – 6:30PM AWST		
Attendance:		42,505		
Umpires:		Vozzo, McInerney, Goldspink		
Goal scorers:	Fremantle	2: Murphy, Farmer, M. Carr, Pavlich; 1: Cook, Webster, Schammer, Mundy, Longmuir, Headland		
Goal scorers:	Melbourne	3: Neitz, Robertson; 2: Davey; 1: McLean, Yze, Miller		
Best:	Fremantle	Black, J. Carr, Schammer, Bell, Parker, M. Carr, Sandilands		
Best:	Melbourne	Miller, Carroll, Brown, Green, McLean, Ward, Johnstone		
Reports:		—		
Injuries:		Fremantle: McPharlin (ankle)		

== Week three ==
=== First preliminary final (Sydney vs. Fremantle) ===
Sydney Swans vs Fremantle Dockers
Team	Q1	Q2	Q3	Final
Sydney Swans	3.6 (24)	8.7 (55)	14.8 (92)	19.13 (127)
Fremantle Dockers	3.2 (20)	6.2 (38)	11.6 (72)	14.8 (92)
Venue:		Telstra Stadium, Sydney		
Date and time:		22 September 2006 – 8:00PM AEST		
Attendance:		61,373		
Umpires:		Vozzo, McBurney, Allen		
Goal scorers:	Sydney	6: Hall; 4: O'Keefe, O'Loughlin; 2: Bolton; 1: Davis, Dempster, Goodes		
Goal scorers:	Fremantle	4: Pavlich 4; 3: Bell; 2: Cook, Crowley; 1: Farmer, Murphy, Peake		
Best:	Sydney	Hall, Kirk, O'Keefe, O'Loughlin, C. Bolton, J. Bolton, Goodes		
Best:	Fremantle	Pavlich, Bell, J. Carr, Crowley, Hayden, Sandilands		
Reports:		Fremantle: Jeff Farmer (Fre) for striking Craig Bolton (Syd), reprimand with 95.85 carryover points; Justin Longmuir (Fre) for striking Barry Hall (Syd), reprimand with 42.18 carryover points.		
Injuries:		Fremantle: Farmer (leg), M.Carr (knee)		

=== Second preliminary final (Adelaide vs. West Coast) ===
Adelaide vs West Coast
Team	Q1	Q2	Q3	Final
Adelaide	3.3 (21)	6.5 (41)	8.8 (56)	11.9 (75)
West Coast	0.4 (4)	2.7 (19)	6.12 (48)	11.19 (85)
Venue:		AAMI Stadium, Adelaide		
Date and time:		23 September 2006 – 3:00PM ACST		
Attendance:		50,514		
Umpires:		Ellis, Ryan, Goldspink		
Goal scorers:	Adelaide	3: Bock; 2: Bode, Burton; 1: Edwards, Welsh, Clarke, McLeod		
Goal scorers:	West Coast	4: Hunter; 2: Embley; 1: Lynch, Kerr, Cousins, Butler, Hansen		
Best:	Adelaide	Johncock, Goodwin, McLeod, Edwards, Reilly, Burton, Thompson		
Best:	West Coast	Cox, Judd, Cousins, Embley, Hunter, Butler, Kerr		
Reports:		—		
Injuries:		Adelaide: Biglands (knee)		

== Week four ==
=== Grand final (Sydney vs. West Coast) ===
Sydney vs West Coast
Team	Q1	Q2	Q3	Final
Sydney	1.4 (10)	4.6 (30)	8.11 (59)	12.12 (84)
West Coast	4.2 (26)	8.7 (55)	10.10 (70)	12.13 (85)
Venue:		Melbourne Cricket Ground, Melbourne		
Date:		30 September 2006 – 2:30PM AEST		
Attendance:		97,431		
Umpires:		Vozzo, Allen, Goldspink		
Goal scorers:	Sydney	3: O'Loughlin, Davis; 1: Mathews, Roberts-Thomson, Goodes, Schneider, O'Keefe, Malceski		
Goal scorers:	West Coast	3: Lynch; 2: Embley, Hansen, Cousins; 1: Judd, Armstrong, Hunter		
Best:	Sydney	Fosdike, Richards, Kennelly, O'Loughlin, McVeigh, Kirk, Goodes		
Best:	West Coast	Embley, Chick, Judd, Glass, Lynch, Selwood, Braun, Cox, Cousins, Kerr		
Reports:		—		
Injuries:		Sydney: Ablett (shoulder)		
Coin toss winner:		West Coast Eagles		
Norm Smith Medal:		Andrew Embley		
Australian television broadcaster:		Network Ten		
National Anthem:		Brian Mannix, John Paul Young, Daryl Braithwaite and Shane Howard		
