= 2007 AFL finals series =

2007 AFL premiership season
- Date: 7–29 September 2007
- Teams: 8
- Premiers: Geelong; 7th premiership
- Runners-up: Port Adelaide (2nd grand final)
- Minor premiers: Geelong; 8th minor premiership

Attendance
- Matches played: 9
- Total attendance: 574,424 (63,825 per match)
- Highest: 98,002 (First Preliminary Final, Geelong vs Collingwood)

The Australian Football League's 2007 Finals Series determined the top eight final positions of the 2007 AFL season. It began on the weekend of 7 September 2007 and ended with the 111th AFL Grand Final at the Melbourne Cricket Ground on 29 September 2007. The Geelong Football Club were crowned the 2007 AFL Premiers, beating the Port Adelaide Football Club by 119 points to win their first premiership since 1963.

The eight teams qualified for the finals series by finishing in the top eight positions of the premiership ladder at the completion of the home and away series.

== Ladder ==
2007 AFL ladder
| Pos | Team | Pld | W | L | D | PF | PA | PP | Pts | |
|---|---|---|---|---|---|---|---|---|---|---|
| 1 | Geelong (P) | 22 | 18 | 4 | 0 | 2542 | 1664 | 152.8 | 72 | Finals series |
| 2 | Port Adelaide | 22 | 15 | 7 | 0 | 2314 | 2038 | 113.5 | 60 | Finals series |
| 3 | West Coast | 22 | 15 | 7 | 0 | 2162 | 1935 | 111.7 | 60 | Finals series |
| 4 | Kangaroos | 22 | 14 | 8 | 0 | 2183 | 1998 | 109.3 | 56 | Finals series |
| 5 | Hawthorn | 22 | 13 | 9 | 0 | 2097 | 1855 | 113.0 | 52 | Finals series |
| 6 | Collingwood | 22 | 13 | 9 | 0 | 2011 | 1992 | 101.0 | 52 | Finals series |
| 7 | Sydney | 22 | 12 | 9 | 1 | 2031 | 1698 | 119.6 | 50 | Finals series |
| 8 | Adelaide | 22 | 12 | 10 | 0 | 1881 | 1712 | 109.9 | 48 | Finals series |
| 9 | St Kilda | 22 | 11 | 10 | 1 | 1874 | 1941 | 96.5 | 46 | |
| 10 | Brisbane Lions | 22 | 9 | 11 | 2 | 1986 | 1885 | 105.4 | 40 | |
| 11 | Fremantle | 22 | 10 | 12 | 0 | 2254 | 2198 | 102.5 | 40 | |
| 12 | Essendon | 22 | 10 | 12 | 0 | 2184 | 2394 | 91.2 | 40 | |
| 13 | Western Bulldogs | 22 | 9 | 12 | 1 | 2111 | 2469 | 85.5 | 38 | |
| 14 | Melbourne | 22 | 5 | 17 | 0 | 1890 | 2418 | 78.2 | 20 | |
| 15 | Carlton | 22 | 4 | 18 | 0 | 2167 | 2911 | 74.4 | 16 | |
| 16 | Richmond | 22 | 3 | 18 | 1 | 1958 | 2537 | 77.2 | 14 | |

Source: AFL ladder
Rules for classification: 1) points; 2) percentage; 3) number of points for.
(P) Premiers

Geelong was easily the minor premier in 2007 and undisputed favourite coming into the Finals Series.

== Summary of results ==
Qualifying and elimination finals
Sep 9, MCG
1 | Geelong | 23.18 (156)
4 | Kangaroos | 8.2 (50)
Sep 8, Telstra Dome
5 | Hawthorn | 15.15 (105)
8 | Adelaide | 15.12 (102)
Sep 8, MCG
6 | Collingwood | 18.17 (125)
7 | Sydney | 13.9 (87)
Sep 7, AAMI Stadium
2 | Port Adelaide | 9.14 (68)
3 | West Coast | 9.11 (65)

Semi-finals
Sep 15, MCG
Kangaroos | 14.9 (93)
Hawthorn | 8.12 (60)
Sep 14, Subiaco Oval
West Coast | 10.14 (74) (aet)
Collingwood | 13.15 (93) (aet)

Preliminary finals
Sep 21, MCG
Geelong | 13.14 (92)
Collingwood | 13.9 (87)
Sep 22, AAMI Stadium
Port Adelaide | 20.13 (133)
Kangaroos | 5.16 (46)

Grand final
Sep 29, MCG
Geelong | 24.19 (163)
Port Adelaide | 6.8 (44)

== The finals system ==
The system is a final eight system. This system is different to the McIntyre final eight system, which was previously used by the AFL.

The top four teams in the eight receive what is popularly known as the "double chance" when they play in week-one qualifying finals; this means that if a top-four team loses in the first week, it still has a chance to redeem itself by getting a chance to play in a semi-final the next week against the winner of an elimination final. The bottom four of the eight are forced to play what are called elimination finals, in which only the winners survive and move on to week two to play the losers of the qualifying finals.

In the second week, the winners of the qualifying finals receive a bye to the third week, while the losers of those qualifying finals must play the winners of the elimination finals for a chance to play the qualifying finals winners. Home-ground advantage goes to the team with the higher seed.

In the third week, the winners of the semi-finals from week two play the winners of the qualifying finals in the first week, with the latter receiving home-ground advantage. The winners of those matches move on to the Grand Final at the Melbourne Cricket Ground in Melbourne, where the new premier will be crowned.

== Week One ==
=== First Qualifying Final (Geelong vs. North Melbourne) ===
Geelong vs North Melbourne
| Team | Q1 | Q2 | Q3 | Final |
|---|---|---|---|---|
| Geelong | 3.5 (23) | 10.10 (70) | 16.16 (112) | 23.18 (156) |
| North Melbourne | 3.0 (18) | 4.1 (25) | 6.1 (37) | 8.2 (50) |
| Venue: | | Melbourne Cricket Ground, Melbourne | | |
| Date and time: | | 9 September 2007 – 2:45PM AEST | | |
| Attendance: | | 77,630 | | |
| Umpires: | | Dean Margetts, Scott McLaren, Scott Jeffery | | |
| Goal scorers: | Geelong | 5: Mooney, Chapman; 3: N Ablett; 2: Enright, G Ablett, Ottens; 1: Bartel, S Johnson, Stokes, Mackie | | |
| Goal scorers: | North Melbourne | 1: McIntosh, Grant, Brown, Petrie, Firrito, Edwards, Harvey, Wells | | |
| Best: | Geelong | Scarlett, G Ablett, Chapman, Milburn, Bartel, Harley, J Selwood, Stokes, Hunt | | |
| Best: | North Melbourne | Rawlings, Firrito, Wells, Edwards, Simpson | | |
| Reports: | | nil | | |
| Injuries: | | nil | | |
| Australian television broadcaster: | | Seven Network | | |

=== Second Qualifying Final (Port Adelaide vs. West Coast) ===
Port Adelaide vs West Coast
| Team | Q1 | Q2 | Q3 | Final |
|---|---|---|---|---|
| Port Adelaide | 1.3 (9) | 2.7 (19) | 6.9 (45) | 9.14 (68) |
| West Coast | 2.3 (15) | 3.6 (24) | 7.10 (52) | 9.11 (65) |
| Venue: | | AAMI Stadium, Adelaide | | |
| Date and time: | | 7 September 2007 – 7:50PM ACST | | |
| Attendance: | | 37,750 | | |
| Umpires: | | Michael Vozzo, Brett Rosebury, Shaun Ryan | | |
| Goal scorers: | Port Adelaide | 1: P. Burgoyne, S. Burgoyne, Chaplin, K. Cornes, Ebert, Motlop, Salopek, Tredrea, Westhoff | | |
| Goal scorers: | West Coast | 2: Judd, Lynch; 1: Cox, Hurn, LeCras, Rosa, Seaby | | |
| Best: | Port Adelaide | P Burgoyne, Lade, Chaplin, K Cornes, Surjan | | |
| Best: | West Coast | Priddis, Stenglein, Waters, Hunter, A Selwood | | |
| Reports: | | nil | | |
| Injuries: | | West Coast: Cousins (hamstring) | | |
| Australian television broadcaster: | | Seven Network | | |

=== First Elimination Final (Hawthorn vs. Adelaide) ===
Hawthorn vs Adelaide
| Team | Q1 | Q2 | Q3 | Final |
|---|---|---|---|---|
| Hawthorn | 4.3 (27) | 8.7 (55) | 10.10 (70) | 15.15 (105) |
| Adelaide | 7.4 (46) | 10.7 (67) | 12.12 (84) | 15.12 (102) |
| Venue: | | Telstra Dome, Melbourne | | |
| Date and time: | | 8 September 2007 – 2:30PM AEST | | |
| Attendance: | | 36,534 | | |
| Umpires: | | Hayden Kennedy, Brett Allen, Ray Chamberlain | | |
| Goal scorers: | Hawthorn | 7: Franklin; 3: Roughead; 1: Lewis, Brown, Bateman, Crawford, Young | | |
| Goal scorers: | Adelaide | 4: McGregor, Welsh; 2: Porplyzia; 1: Edwards, Gill, Knights, van Berlo, Torney | | |
| Best: | Hawthorn | Crawford, Franklin, Roughead, Sewell, Hodge, Brown, Ladson, Birchall, Guerra | | |
| Best: | Adelaide | Shirley, Torney, McGregor, Thompson, Goodwin, Massie, Edwards, Stevens | | |
| Reports: | | Adelaide: Torney (high contact) | | |
| Injuries: | | Hawthorn: McGlynn (adductor) out, replaced in selected side by Osborne, Hodge (knee), Bateman (hamstring); Adelaide: Porplyzia (shoulder) | | |
| Australian television broadcaster: | | Ten Network | | |

=== Second Elimination Final (Collingwood vs. Sydney) ===
Collingwood vs Sydney
| Team | Q1 | Q2 | Q3 | Final |
|---|---|---|---|---|
| Collingwood | 6.5 (41) | 8.9 (57) | 13.12 (90) | 18.17 (125) |
| Sydney | 1.4 (10) | 7.5 (47) | 9.8 (62) | 13.9 (87) |
| Venue: | | Melbourne Cricket Ground, Melbourne | | |
| Date and time: | | 8 September 2007 – 7:30PM AEST | | |
| Attendance: | | 64,645 | | |
| Umpires: | | Stephen McBurney, Matt Stevic, Shane McInerney | | |
| Goal scorers: | Collingwood | 6: Rocca; 3: Cloke, Rusling; 1: Buckley, Davis, Didak, Medhurst, Pendlebury, Swan | | |
| Goal scorers: | Sydney | 4: O'Loughlin; 2: Davis, Malceski; 1: Bolton, Fosdike, Hall, Kirk, Schneider | | |
| Best: | Collingwood | Rocca, Shaw, Pendlebury, Cloke, Buckley, Swan, Davis | | |
| Best: | Sydney | Goodes, Kirk, Malceski, O'Loughlin, Crouch | | |
| Reports: | | nil | | |
| Injuries: | | nil | | |
| Australian television broadcaster: | | Ten Network | | |

== Week Two ==
=== First Semi-final (North Melbourne vs. Hawthorn) ===
North Melbourne vs Hawthorn
| Team | Q1 | Q2 | Q3 | Final |
|---|---|---|---|---|
| North Melbourne | 3.3 (21) | 5.5 (35) | 9.7 (61) | 14.9 (93) |
| Hawthorn | 2.1 (13) | 4.3 (27) | 6.8 (44) | 8.12 (60) |
| Venue: | | MCG, Melbourne | | |
| Date and time: | | 15 September 2007 - 7:30PM AEST | | |
| Attendance: | | 74,981 | | |
| Umpires: | | Michael Vozzo, Brett Rosebury, Scott McLaren | | |
| Goal scorers: | North Melbourne | 4: Edwards, Harvey; 1: Swallow, Petrie, McIntosh, McMahon, Grant, Wells | | |
| Goal scorers: | Hawthorn | 3: Franklin; 1: Roughead, Boyle, Bateman, Guerra, Lewis | | |
| Best: | North Melbourne | Smith, Rawlings, Harris, Gibson, Edwards, McIntosh, Harvey | | |
| Best: | Hawthorn | Sewell, Lewis, Guerra, Croad, Bateman, Crawford | | |
| Reports: | | Hawthorn: Crawford (striking), Lewis (striking), Hodge (striking) | | |
| Injuries: | | nil | | |
| Australian television broadcaster: | | Ten Network | | |

=== Second semi final (West Coast vs Collingwood) ===
West Coast vs Collingwood
| Team | Q1 | Q2 | Q3 | Q4 | Final (ET) |
|---|---|---|---|---|---|
| West Coast | 0.4 (4) | 5.5 (35) | 8.9 (57) | 10.12 (72) | 10.14 (74) |
| Collingwood | 1.5 (11) | 4.8 (32) | 7.11 (53) | 10.12 (72) | 13.15 (93) |
| Venue: | | Subiaco Oval, Perth | | | |
| Date and time: | | 14 September 2007 - 6:45PM AWST | | | |
| Attendance: | | 43,627 | | | |
| Umpires: | | Stephen McBurney, Shaun Ryan, Shane McInerney | | | |
| Goal scorers: | West Coast | 2: Lecras, Wirrpanda; 1: Cox, Embley, Fletcher, Lynch, Priddis, Rosa | | | |
| Goal scorers: | Collingwood | 3: Rocca; 2: Didak, Medhurst, Swan; 1: Bryan, Cloke, Pendlebury, Thomas | | | |
| Best: | West Coast | Cox, Priddis, Jones, Chick, Glass | | | |
| Best: | Collingwood | Didak, Medhurst, Pendlebury, Swan, Goldsack | | | |
| Reports: | | nil | | | |
| Injuries: | | West Coast: Hansen (hamstring); Collingwood: Burns (ankle) | | | |
| Australian television broadcaster: | | Seven Network | | | |

Scores were tied at the end of regulation time, with both teams having scored 10.12 (72). Two five-minute periods of extra time were played to decide a winner. This was only the second time that extra time had been implemented since the provision to do so was introduced in the early 1990s. In two coincidences, it was the drawn qualifying final between these two teams in 1990 which most directly led to the introduction of the extra time provision in the first place, and; it was the pairing of the weekend's other game, Hawthorn and the North Melbourne, who contested the only previous game to require extra time.

== Week Three ==
=== First Preliminary Final (Geelong vs. Collingwood) ===
Geelong vs Collingwood
| Team | Q1 | Q2 | Q3 | Final |
|---|---|---|---|---|
| Geelong | 4.4 (28) | 7.6 (48) | 9.13 (67) | 13.14 (92) |
| Collingwood | 2.5 (17) | 6.7 (43) | 9.8 (62) | 13.9 (87) |
| Venue: | | Melbourne Cricket Ground, Melbourne | | |
| Date and time: | | 21 September 2007 - 7:50PM AEST | | |
| Attendance: | | 98,002 | | |
| Umpires: | | Stephen McBurney, Scott McLaren, Shane McInerney | | |
| Goal scorers: | Geelong | 3: S. Johnson, Stokes; 2: Mooney; 1: G. Ablett, Chapman, Kelly, Ottens, Rooke | | |
| Goal scorers: | Collingwood | 3: Cloke, Medhurst; 2: Didak, Rusling; 1: Davis, O'Bree, Burns | | |
| Best: | Geelong | G. Ablett, Ottens, Corey, Bartel, S. Johnson, Scarlett, Milburn, Hunt | | |
| Best: | Collingwood | H. Shaw, Clement, Lockyer, Clarke, O'Bree, O'Brien, Buckley, Cloke | | |
| Reports: | | nil | | |
| Injuries: | | Collingwood: Rocca (ankle) | | |
| Australian television broadcaster: | | Seven Network | | |

=== Second Preliminary Final (Port Adelaide vs. North Melbourne) ===
Port Adelaide vs North Melbourne
| Team | Q1 | Q2 | Q3 | Final |
|---|---|---|---|---|
| Port Adelaide | 6.0 (36) | 9.3 (57) | 17.10 (112) | 20.13 (133) |
| North Melbourne | 3.2 (20) | 3.7 (25) | 4.10 (34) | 5.16 (46) |
| Venue: | | AAMI Stadium, Adelaide | | |
| Date and time: | | 22 September 2007- 4:30PM ACST | | |
| Attendance: | | 44,953 | | |
| Umpires: | | Michael Vozzo, Hayden Kennedy, Brett Rosebury | | |
| Goal scorers: | Port Adelaide | 3: Ebert, Motlop, Tredrea; 2: Logan, Rodan, Salopek; 1: Boak, C Cornes, K Cornes, Pearce, Westhoff | | |
| Goal scorers: | North Melbourne | 2: Grant; 1: Edwards, Harris, Lower | | |
| Best: | Port Adelaide | Chaplin, S. Burgoyne, C. Cornes, Logan, Pearce, Surjan, Rodan, Ebert, Motlop | | |
| Best: | North Melbourne | Harris, Simpson, Sinclair, Archer, Lower | | |
| Reports: | | nil | | |
| Injuries: | | Port Adelaide: Wilson (ruptured achilles tendon) | | |
| Australian television broadcaster: | | Ten Network | | |

== Week Four ==
=== Grand Final (Geelong vs. Port Adelaide) ===
Grand final
Saturday, 29 September (2:40 pm) | Geelong | def. | Port Adelaide | MCG (crowd: 97,302) | Report
5.7 (37); 11.13 (79); 18.17 (125); 24.19 (163) | Q1; Q2; Q3; Final | 2.2 (14); 4.3 (27); 5.5 (35); 6.8 (44) | Umpires: McBurney, McInerney, McLaren; Norm Smith Medal: Steve Johnson (Geelong); Television broadcast: Network Ten; National anthem: Natalie Bassingthwaighte
Mooney 5 Chapman, Johnson 4 N. Ablett 3 Bartel 2 Ottens, Byrnes, G. Ablett, Rooke, Ling, Mackie 1 | Goals | 2 Tredrea, S. Burgoyne; 1 C. Cornes, Logan
Johnson, Chapman, Scarlett, King, Ottens, Mooney, Corey, Enright, Bartel | Best | Tredrea, P. Burgoyne, K. Cornes
Nil | Injuries | Nil
Nil | Reports | Nil
Geelong's winning margin of 119 points was the biggest in a grand final ever.

== See also ==
- 2007 AFL Season

== Notes and references ==
AFL final eight system
