= 2008 AFL finals series =

2008 AFL premiership season
- Date: 5–27 September 2008
- Teams: 8
- Premiers: Hawthorn; 10th premiership
- Runners-up: Geelong (16th grand final)
- Minor premiers: Geelong; 9th minor premiership

Attendance
- Matches played: 9
- Total attendance: 571,760 (63,529 per match)
- Highest: 100,012 (Grand Final, Geelong vs. Hawthorn)

The Australian Football League's 2008 Finals Series determined the top eight final positions of the 2008 AFL season. It began on the weekend of 5 September 2008 and ended with the 112th AFL Grand Final at the Melbourne Cricket Ground on 27 September 2008. The Hawthorn Football Club were crowned the 2008 AFL Premiers, beating the Geelong Football Club by 26 points in front of a crowd of 100,012.

The eight teams qualified for the finals series by finishing in the top eight positions of the premiership ladder at the completion of the home and away series.

== Ladder ==
2008 AFL ladder
Pos	Team	Pld	W	L	D	PF	PA	PP	Pts	
1	Geelong	22	21	1	0	2672	1651	161.8	84	Finals series
2	Hawthorn (P)	22	17	5	0	2434	1846	131.9	68	Finals series
3	Western Bulldogs	22	15	6	1	2506	2112	118.7	62	Finals series
4	St Kilda	22	13	9	0	2126	1923	110.6	52	Finals series
5	Adelaide	22	13	9	0	2017	1838	109.7	52	Finals series
6	Sydney	22	12	9	1	2095	1863	112.5	50	Finals series
7	North Melbourne	22	12	9	1	2121	2187	97.0	50	Finals series
8	Collingwood	22	12	10	0	2267	2038	111.2	48	Finals series
9	Richmond	22	11	10	1	2228	2288	97.4	46	
10	Brisbane	22	10	12	0	2156	2200	98.0	40	
11	Carlton	22	10	12	0	2217	2354	94.2	40	
12	Essendon	22	8	14	0	2130	2608	81.7	32	
13	Port Adelaide	22	7	15	0	2118	2208	95.9	28	
14	Fremantle	22	6	16	0	1988	2121	93.7	24	
15	West Coast	22	4	18	0	1670	2535	65.9	16	
16	Melbourne	22	3	19	0	1629	2602	62.6	12	

Source: AFL ladder
Rules for classification: 1) points; 2) percentage; 3) number of points for.
(P) Premiers

With twenty-one wins and one loss Geelong continued from its crushing 2007 season to dominate the home and away rounds of 2008.

== Summary of results ==
Qualifying and elimination finals
Sep 7, MCG
1	Geelong	17.17 (119)
4	St Kilda	8.13 (61)
Sep 6, AAMI Stadium
5	Adelaide	14.10 (94)
8	Collingwood	19.11 (125)
Sep 6, ANZ Stadium
6	Sydney	17.8 (110)
7	North Melbourne	11.9 (75)
Sep 5, MCG
2	Hawthorn	18.19 (127)
3	Western Bulldogs	11.10 (76)

Semi-finals
Sep 13, MCG
St Kilda	17.4 (106)
Collingwood	9.18 (72)
Sep 12, MCG
Western Bulldogs	16.10 (106)
Sydney	9.15 (69)

Preliminary finals
Sep 19, MCG
Geelong	12.11 (83)
Western Bulldogs	7.12 (54)
Sep 20, MCG
Hawthorn	18.10 (118)
St Kilda	9.10 (64)

Grand final
Sep 27, MCG
Geelong	11.23 (89)
Hawthorn	18.7 (115)

== The finals system ==
The system is a final eight system. This system is different from the McIntyre final eight system, which was previously used by the AFL.

The top four teams in the eight receive what is popularly known as the "double chance" when they play in week-one qualifying finals; this means that if a top-four team loses in the first week, it still has a chance to redeem itself by getting a chance to play in a semi-final the next week against the winner of an elimination final. The bottom four of the eight are forced to play what are called elimination finals, in which only the winners survive and move on to week two to play the losers of the qualifying finals.

In the second week, the winners of the qualifying finals receive a bye to the third week, while the losers of those qualifying finals must play the winners of the elimination finals for a chance to play the qualifying finals winners. Home-city advantage goes to the team with the higher seed in the first two weeks, and the qualifying final winners in the third week, with games in Victoria played at the MCG, regardless of the team's usual home ground.

In the third week, the winners of the semi-finals from week two play the winners of the qualifying finals in the first week, with the latter receiving home-ground advantage. The winners of those matches move on to the Grand Final at the Melbourne Cricket Ground in Melbourne, where the new premier will be crowned.

== Week One ==
=== First Qualifying Final (Geelong vs. St Kilda) ===
Geelong vs St Kilda
Team	Q1	Q2	Q3	Final
Geelong	3.7 (25)	7.10 (52)	16.15 (111)	17.17 (119)
St Kilda	1.1 (7)	3.2 (20)	5.5 (35)	8.13 (61)
Venue:		Melbourne Cricket Ground, Melbourne		
Date and time:		7 September 2008 – 2:40PM AEST		
Attendance:		71,653		
Umpires:		Hayden Kennedy, Simon Meredith, Shane McInerney		
Goal scorers:	Geelong	3: Mooney, Ottens; 2: Bartel, Lonergan; 1: G.Ablett, Chapman, S.Johnson, Ling, Rooke, Stokes, Varcoe		
Goal scorers:	St Kilda	2: Milne; 1: X. Clarke, R. Clarke, Goddard, Montagna, Riewoldt, Schneider		
Best:	Geelong	Bartel, Ottens, G. Ablett, Mooney, Corey, Milburn, Taylor, Ling		
Best:	St Kilda	Goddard, S. Fisher, Jones, Hayes		
Reports:		St Kilda: Hayes for striking Selwood (Geelong) in the third quarter Geelong: Nil		
Injuries:		Geelong: Prismall (knee), Chapman (hamstring), S. Johnson (corked hamstring), Milburn (thumb); St Kilda: Blake (wrist)		
Australian television broadcaster:		Seven Network		

St Kilda finished in 4th spot on the AFL Ladder after thrashing Essendon by 108 points in the final regular season match. They entered this match with the double chance and were beaten by 58 points. Onballer Lenny Hayes was booked for striking Geelong's Joel Selwood in the third quarter, a report that was later dropped. Geelong earned a bye and home preliminary final with its win, whilst St Kilda was forced to face Collingwood, a team that they had twice lost to in the regular season, in a semi-final.

=== Second Qualifying Final (Hawthorn vs. Western Bulldogs) ===
Hawthorn vs Western Bulldogs
Team	Q1	Q2	Q3	Final
Hawthorn	4.5 (29)	10.12 (72)	15.17 (107)	18.19 (127)
Western Bulldogs	2.1 (13)	4.4 (28)	7.7 (49)	11.10 (76)
Venue:		Melbourne Cricket Ground, Melbourne		
Date and time:		5 September 2008 – 7:50PM AEST		
Attendance:		76,703		
Umpires:		Chris Donlon, Brett Rosebury, Shaun Ryan		
Goal scorers:	Hawthorn	8: Franklin; 4: Osborne; 3: Roughead; 1: Brown, Crawford, Lewis		
Goal scorers:	Western Bulldogs	3: Akermanis; 2: Giansiracusa, Cooney, Hill; 1: Higgins, Johnson		
Best:	Hawthorn	Franklin, Hodge, Mitchell, Osborne, Sewell, Lewis, Roughead		
Best:	Western Bulldogs	Griffen, Cross, Akermanis, Boyd, Hill, Callan		
Reports:		Nil		
Injuries:		Hawthorn: Croad (ankle), Birchall (corked thigh), Ladson (AC joint), Stokes (corked thigh), Gilham (virus) replaced in the selected side by Stokes; Western Bulldogs: Gilbee (calf), Murphy (corked knee)		
Australian television broadcaster:		Seven Network		

For much of the second half of the season, Hawthorn and the Western Bulldogs looked certain to finish second and third (in some order), setting up this particular qualifying final; Hawthorn would ultimately be the home team after the Bulldogs' late-season form dropped. Hawthorn won the match comfortably, with Lance Franklin kicking eight goals (the most ever in a final by a Hawthorn player) to earn a week's break, whilst the Western Bulldogs were forced to host the Sydney Swans, whom they had beaten twice during the year, in a semi-final.

=== First Elimination Final (Adelaide vs. Collingwood) ===
Adelaide vs Collingwood
Team	Q1	Q2	Q3	Final
Adelaide	2.2 (14)	9.6 (60)	11.7 (73)	14.10 (94)
Collingwood	4.3 (27)	7.6 (48)	14.9 (93)	19.11 (125)
Venue:		AAMI Stadium, Adelaide		
Date and time:		6 September 2008 – 2:30PM AEST		
Attendance:		37,685		
Umpires:		Mathew James, Scott McLaren, Matt Stevic		
Goal scorers:	Adelaide	6: Stevens; 2: McLeod; 1: Mackay, Edwards, Maric, Johncock, Bassett, Gill		
Goal scorers:	Collingwood	3: Dawes, Anthony; 2: Swan, Maxwell; 1: Cox, Davis, Fraser, Cloke, R. Shaw, Lockyer, Thomas, Clarke, Medhurst		
Best:	Adelaide	Stevens, Bassett, McLeod, Bock, Edwards, Moran		
Best:	Collingwood	Swan, O'Bree, Maxwell, Pendlebury, Anthony, Medhurst		
Reports:		Nil		
Injuries:		Nil		
Australian television broadcaster:		Network Ten		

Two teams who were early-season top-four candidates were playing for survival in this elimination final played at AAMI Stadium on a fine 26-degree C day. Collingwood started slight favourites and led early in the match but Adelaide got its game going, with a season's best second quarter, to lead at half-time before quickly falling behind for good during a second-half collapse. For the second year in succession, Adelaide was eliminated the first week of the finals, whilst Collingwood went on to face St Kilda in a semi-final at the Melbourne Cricket Ground.

=== Second Elimination Final (Sydney vs. North Melbourne) ===
Sydney vs North Melbourne
Team	Q1	Q2	Q3	Final
Sydney	1.5 (11)	4.6 (30)	12.7 (79)	17.8 (110)
North Melbourne	4.1 (25)	7.4 (46)	10.5 (65)	11.9 (75)
Venue:		ANZ Stadium, Sydney		
Date and time:		6 September 2008 – 7:30PM AEST		
Attendance:		19,127		
Umpires:		Ray Chamberlain, Stephen McBurney, Michael Vozzo		
Goal scorers:	Sydney	3: Goodes, Hall, Jack; 2: Moore, O'Keefe; 1: Malceski, McVeigh, Richards, Veszpremi		
Goal scorers:	North Melbourne	2: Harvey, Grant, Hale, Lower; 1: Petrie, Sinclair, Thompson		
Best:	Sydney	Kirk, Richards, Goodes, McVeigh, O'Keefe, Hall, Jack		
Best:	North Melbourne	Harvey, Petrie, Pratt, Harris, Lower, Hale		
Reports:		Nil		
Injuries:		Sydney: Bird replaced in selected side by Veszpremi; North Melbourne: Hansen replaced in selected side by Urquhart		
Australian television broadcaster:		Network Ten		

These two teams were clashing in a final for the first time since the 1996 AFL Grand Final, which was won by North Melbourne by 43 points. Sydney entered this match having won only three matches since Round 13, but, after a slow start and an ordinary first half, they got on with the job and ended the Kangaroos' season. It was also the last game for retiring Kangaroo and ex-Swan Shannon Grant. The Swans won the right to face the Western Bulldogs the next week at the Melbourne Cricket Ground, where they had not won a final since the 2005 AFL Grand Final.

Most controversially, the crowd for this game was a very low 19,127. The AFL attributed the poor turnout to several factors, including high ticket prices, the bad weather (it was raining heavily, and had been doing so for several days) and North Melbourne's lack of popularity in Sydney (where they had once played home games). However, it also attracted heavy commentary in the media and public against the viability of the AFL's decision to base its 18th franchise in Western Sydney.

== Week Two ==
=== First semi-final (St Kilda vs. Collingwood) ===
St Kilda vs Collingwood
Team	Q1	Q2	Q3	Final
St Kilda	4.1 (25)	8.1 (49)	14.2 (86)	17.4 (106)
Collingwood	3.4 (22)	4.11 (35)	5.16 (46)	9.18 (72)
Venue:		Melbourne Cricket Ground, Melbourne		
Date and time:		13 September 2008 – 7:30PM AEST		
Attendance:		76,707		
Umpires:		Hayden Kennedy, Brett Rosebury, Scott McLaren		
Goal scorers:	St Kilda	Riewoldt 5, Milne 3, Koschitzke 3, Gram 2, Dal Santo, McQualter, Schneider, Gwilt		
Goal scorers:	Collingwood	Clarke, Brown, Medhurst, McCarthy, Cloke, Goldsack, Anthony, Swan, Lockyer		
Best:	St Kilda	Riewoldt, Dal Santo, Gram, R Clarke, Fisher, Blake, Koschitzke		
Best:	Collingwood	Pendlebury, Swan, R Shaw, O'Brien, O'Bree		
Reports:		St Kilda: Koschitzke reported for rough conduct on Wakelin. Collingwood: nil.		
Injuries:		St Kilda: Ball (hamstring) replaced in selected side by Allen, Allen (hip). Collingwood: Burns (calf) replaced in selected side by R Shaw, Prestigiacomo replaced in selected side by Wakelin.		
Australian television broadcaster:		Network Ten		

Collingwood came into the game as favourites to defeat St Kilda, who had been on the end of a heavy defeat at the hands of Geelong the week prior, and whom they had beaten twice during the year. St Kilda led by just three points at quarter time but kicked ten goals to Collingwood's two in the middle two quarters to take a 40-point lead going into the final quarter. Justin Koschitzke was reported for a dump tackle involving Shane Wakelin, but the charge was later dismissed. St Kilda progressed to play Hawthorn in the preliminary final, hoping to atone for two previous preliminary final losses (2004 and 2005) to make the grand final.

=== Second semi-final (Western Bulldogs vs. Sydney) ===
Western Bulldogs vs Sydney
Team	Q1	Q2	Q3	Final
Western Bulldogs	2.3 (15)	6.5 (41)	11.9 (75)	16.10 (106)
Sydney	2.4 (16)	5.7 (37)	5.13 (43)	9.15 (69)
Venue:		Melbourne Cricket Ground, Melbourne		
Date and time:		12 September 2008 – 7:50PM AEST		
Attendance:		42,731		
Umpires:		Michael Vozzo, Stephen McBurney, Shaun Ryan		
Goal scorers:	Western Bulldogs	Murphy 3, Welsh 2, Hill 2, Eagleton 2, Johnson, Akermanis, Minson, Griffen, Lake, Hahn, Higgins		
Goal scorers:	Sydney	Hall 4, Bevan, Crouch, Goodes, Roberts-Thomson, Jolly		
Best:	Western Bulldogs	Boyd, Morris, Griffen, Murphy, Gilbee, Minson		
Best:	Sydney	Hall, C Bolton, Kirk, Kennelly, McVeigh		
Reports:		Western Bulldogs: Nil. Sydney Swans: Leo Barry for striking Shaun Higgins in the final quarter.		
Injuries:		nil		
Australian television broadcaster:		Seven Network		

Sydney held a one-point lead at quarter time, but failed to score a major in the third quarter, and fell apart to lose by 37 points, thus ending their season at the semi-finals stage. Fullback Leo Barry was booked for striking Shaun Higgins but the report was thrown out. The Western Bulldogs were drawn to play defending premier Geelong in the preliminary final to battle for a Grand Final berth.

== Week Three ==
=== First Preliminary Final (Geelong vs. Western Bulldogs) ===
Geelong vs Western Bulldogs
Team	Q1	Q2	Q3	Final
Geelong	5.3 (33)	8.8 (56)	10.9 (69)	12.11 (83)
Western Bulldogs	4.3 (27)	5.5 (35)	7.9 (51)	7.12 (54)
Venue:		Melbourne Cricket Ground, Melbourne		
Date and time:		19 September 2008 - 7:40PM AEST		
Attendance:		70,140		
Umpires:		Michael Vozzo, Stephen McBurney, Shaun Ryan		
Goal scorers:	Geelong	Rooke 2, S. Johnson 2, Stokes, Bartel, Wojcinski, Lonergan, Harley, Ottens, Varcoe, Mooney		
Goal scorers:	Western Bulldogs	Higgins 2, Harbrow 2, Johnson, Akermanis, Eagleton		
Best:	Geelong	Mackie, Ling, Harley, Corey, Selwood, Bartel		
Best:	Western Bulldogs	Harbrow, Gilbee, Hargrave, Lake, Murphy, Callan		
Reports:		Geelong: Nil Western Bulldogs: Josh Hill for making head-high contact with Andrew Mackie in the third quarter.		
Injuries:		Geelong: Nil Western Bulldogs: Giansiracusa (ankle)		
Australian television broadcaster:		Seven Network		

Geelong progressed to their second straight Grand Final but had to, for the second year in succession, withstand a late challenge from their preliminary final opponent. The Western Bulldogs had much of the play, but missed shots on goal in the second half when they were available. This was the Western Bulldogs's furthest finish in a season since 1998, when they made back-to-back preliminary finals.

=== Second Preliminary Final (Hawthorn vs. St Kilda) ===
Hawthorn vs St Kilda
Team	Q1	Q2	Q3	Final
Hawthorn	4.4 (28)	11.5 (71)	15.8 (98)	18.10 (118)
St Kilda	2.3 (15)	3.6 (24)	7.7 (49)	9.10 (64)
Venue:		Melbourne Cricket Ground, Melbourne		
Date and time:		20 September 2008 - 7:00PM AEST		
Attendance:		77,002		
Umpires:		Hayden Kennedy, Brett Rosebury, Scott McLaren		
Goal scorers:	Hawthorn	Williams 5, Roughead 4, Rioli 2, Young 2, Bateman, Brown, Crawford, Franklin, Osborne		
Goal scorers:	St Kilda	Riewoldt 3, Fisher 2, Fiora, Milne, Montagna, Schneider		
Best:	Hawthorn	Lewis, Mitchell, Williams, Sewell, Young, Hodge, Guerra, Birchall		
Best:	St Kilda	Hudghton, Goddard, Fisher, Clarke, Hayes		
Reports:		Nil		
Injuries:		Hawthorn: Hodge (ribs) St. Kilda: Nil		
Australian television broadcaster:		Network Ten		

Hawthorn defied a poor recent record against the Saints to post one of their best wins of the season, with strong performances by much of the team making up for Coleman Medallist Lance Franklin being kept to a single goal by Saints backman Max Hudghton. The loss was the 383rd and last game for St Kilda's Robert Harvey who left the game as the most capped player without an AFL premiership.

== Week Four ==
=== Grand Final (Geelong vs. Hawthorn) ===
Geelong vs Hawthorn
Team	Q1	Q2	Q3	Final
Geelong	5.3 (33)	6.12 (48)	9.18 (72)	11.23 (89)
Hawthorn	5.2 (32)	8.3 (51)	14.5 (89)	18.7 (115)
Venue:		Melbourne Cricket Ground, Melbourne		
Date:		27 September 2008 – 2:30PM AEST		
Attendance:		100,012		
Umpires:		Scott McLaren, Michael Vozzo, Shaun Ryan		
Goal scorers:	Geelong	2: Mooney, Ablett, Rooke, Lonergan; 1: Chapman, Milburn, Johnson		
Goal scorers:	Hawthorn	3: Williams; 2: Rioli, Dew, Franklin, Roughead; 1: Bateman, Ellis, Brown, Young, Hodge, Mitchell, Ladson		
Best:	Geelong	Ablett, Scarlett, Selwood, Chapman, Corey		
Best:	Hawthorn	Hodge, Sewell, Crawford, Dew, Ellis, Osborne, Williams		
Reports:		Nil		
Injuries:		Geelong: Harley (concussion); Hawthorn: Croad (foot), Young (ankle)		
Coin toss winner:				
Norm Smith Medal:		Luke Hodge		
Australian television broadcaster:		Seven Network		
National Anthem:		Amanda Harrison and Lucy Durack		

Hawthorn surprised the minor premiers Geelong to come away with their 10th premiership to win by 26 points in a match that was played in front of 100,012 people on a warm 27°C afternoon. The Cats kicked 23 behinds for the match, some which were deliberately rushed by the Hawks.

Luke Hodge won the Norm Smith Medal as best afield while teammates Shane Crawford retired after playing 305 games and Trent Croad would ultimately also play his last game after 222 games after breaking his foot during the game.

== See also ==
- 2008 AFL season
