= All-Australian umpires =

Award presented to the top-ranking AFL and AFL Women's umpires each season

The All-Australian umpires, similar to the All-Australian team, are a panel of Australian rules football umpires named as the best performing at the conclusion of the regular season each year. Teams are named for both the Australian Football League and the AFL Women's (AFLW), and are selected by the leagues' umpiring coaches. In each league, one field umpire, one boundary umpire and one goal umpire are selected.

== History ==
The AFL have selected All-Australian umpires in the men's league since 1991; however, until 2005, this honour was reserved for field umpires only. In the AFLW, panels of three umpires have been named since 2022 season 7. Field umpires were also occasionally named with the All-Australian sides named at AFL Women's National Championships prior to the founding of the AFLW.

== Panels ==
AFL

Season	Field	Boundary	Goal
2026	Hayden Meyer	Jordan Russell	Dylan Benwell
2025	Jacob Mollison	Damien Main	Adam Wojcik
2024	Matt Stevic	Michael Barlow	Matthew Dervan
2023	Robert Findlay	Matthew Konetschka	Adam Wojcik
2022	Simon Meredith	Chris Gordon	Matthew Dervan
2021	Matt Stevic	Michael Marantelli	Steve Axon
2020	Matt Stevic	Matthew Tomkins	Matthew Dervan
2019	Shaun Ryan	Matthew Tomkins	Steven Piperno
2018	Matt Stevic	Nathan Doig	Steven Piperno
2018	Matt Stevic	Nathan Doig	Stephen Williams
2017	Matt Stevic	Rob Haala	Luke Walker
2016	Matt Stevic	Rob Haala	Adam Wojcik
2015	Matt Stevic	Ian Burrows	Adam Wojcik
2014	Matt Stevic	Mark Thomson	Chris Appleton
2013	Mathew Nicholls	Nathan Doig	Luke Walker
2012	Matt Stevic	Ian Burrows	Luke Walker
2011	Brett Rosebury	Mark Thomson	Luke Walker
2010	Shaun Ryan	Ian Burrows	Luke Walker
2009	Brett Rosebury	Adam Coote	David Dixon
2008	Brett Rosebury	Adam Coote	Peter Nastasi
2007	Stephen McBurney	Darren Wilson	Steven Axon
2006	Brett Allen	Jonathan Creasey	David Flegg
2005	Darren Goldspink	Gordon Muir	David Dixon
2004	Mathew James	Not awarded	
2003	Stephen McBurney	Not awarded	
2002	Brett Allen	Not awarded	
2001	Scott McLaren	Not awarded	
2000	Brett Allen	Not awarded	
1999	Brett Allen	Not awarded	
1998	Andrew Coates	Not awarded	
1997	Hayden Kennedy	Not awarded	
1996	Mark Nash	Not awarded	
1995	Darren Goldspink	Not awarded	
1994	David Howlett	Not awarded	
1993	Darren Goldspink	Not awarded	
1992	Peter Carey	Not awarded	
1991	Bryan Sheehan	Not awarded	

1991–2022 source:

AFL Women's

Season	Field	Boundary	Goal
2025	Joshua Ball	Riley Guerin	Michael Button
2024	Sam Whetton	Ben Duce	Georgia Henderson
2023	Joel Clamp	Adrian Pretorius	Emilie Hill
2022 (S7)	Thomas Chrystie	Trent Bowes	Adam Stegar
2009	Jodi Maisey	Not awarded	
2007	Jodi Maisey	Not awarded	

== Records ==
Most selected field umpire: Matt Stevic (9)

Most selected boundary umpire: Ian Burrows (3)

Most selected goal umpire: Luke Walker (5)
