= 2007 AFL Grand Final =

Grand final of the 2007 Australian Football League season

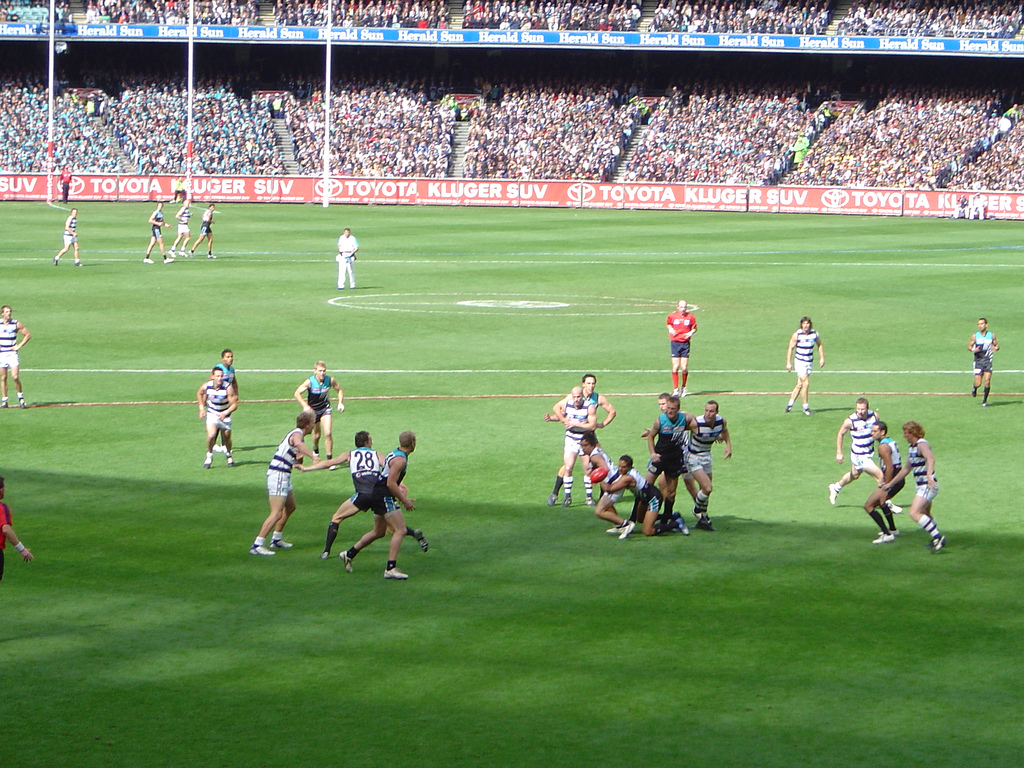
- Players in action during the first quarter of the game

Geelong	Port Adelaide
24.19 (163)	6.8 (44)
	1	2	3	4
GEE	5.7 (37)	11.13 (79)	18.17 (125)	24.19 (163)
PA	2.2 (14)	4.3 (27)	5.5 (35)	6.8 (44)
- Date: 29 September 2007
- Stadium: Melbourne Cricket Ground
- Attendance: 97,302
- Favourite: Geelong
- Umpires: Stephen McBurney (3), Shane McInerney (30), Scott McLaren (11)
- Coin toss won by: Geelong
- Kicked toward: City End

Ceremonies
- Pre-match entertainment: Natalie Bassingthwaighte, Jet
- National anthem: Natalie Bassingthwaighte

Accolades
- Norm Smith Medallist: Steve Johnson (Geelong)
- Jock McHale Medallist: Mark Thompson (Geelong)

Broadcast in Australia
- Network: Network Ten
- Commentators: Anthony Hudson (host); Tim Lane (commentator); Michael Voss (special comments); Robert Walls (special comments); Malcolm Blight (special comments); Corey Wingard (boundary rider); Andrew Maher (boundary rider)

The 2007 AFL Grand Final was an Australian rules football game contested between the Geelong Football Club and the Port Adelaide Football Club, held at the Melbourne Cricket Ground in Melbourne on 29 September 2007. It was the 111th annual Grand Final of the Australian Football League (formerly the Victorian Football League), staged to determine the premiers for the 2007 AFL season.

The match, attended by 97,302 spectators, was won by Geelong by a margin of 119 points, the greatest winning margin in VFL/AFL grand final history and the only one by 100 points or more. The victory marked Geelong's seventh premiership win, and ended its 44-year premiership drought.

== Background ==
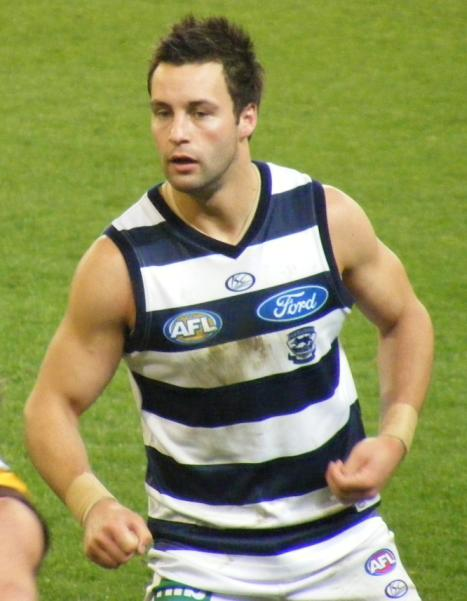
2007 Brownlow Medal winner Jimmy Bartel of Geelong (pictured in 2008)

Geelong entered the season after finishing 10th in 2006. Geelong was the best performing side of the home and away season in 2007, finishing 12 points clear of second-placed Port Adelaide, with an 18–4 record and a percentage of 152.8, winning the McClelland Trophy. After opening the season with a 2–3 record, Geelong had lost only one of its last 19 games: by five points against Port Adelaide at Skilled Stadium in round 21 when Domenic Cassisi goaled with three seconds remaining. The grand final was Geelong's first appearance in a premiership decider since 1995, when they lost to Carlton. Geelong defeated the Kangaroos in their qualifying final at the Melbourne Cricket Ground by 106 points, earning them a second week bye, before they met Collingwood in the preliminary final, which Geelong won by five points in front of a crowd of 98,002.

Port Adelaide had finished 12th the previous season, but rose 10 places to finish second on the ladder in 2007, with a 15–7 record and a percentage of 113.54. Port Adelaide had hosted reigning premiers West Coast Eagles at AAMI Stadium in their qualifying final, winning by three points after trailing all night. Having also earned a second week bye, they hosted the Kangaroos in a preliminary final at AAMI Stadium, winning by 87 points. Having won the 2004 Grand Final, Port Adelaide was looking to secure two flags in four years.

It was the first grand final fought between two teams that missed the finals the previous year since 1997.

== Match summary ==
The grand final was a one-sided affair from start to finish. Geelong outscored Port Adelaide 5.7 (37) to 2.2 (14) in the opening quarter, with only inaccurate goalkicking preventing a greater advantage. They then kicked five goals in the first 12 minutes of the second quarter to extend the margin to 52 points, all but ending any chances Port Adelaide had. Seven goals to one in the third quarter extended the lead to 90 points, and another six goals to one in the final quarter saw the lead reach a game-high 128 points, before eventually finishing at 119 points.

Geelong excelled in its defence—which had been the best in the competition all season—keeping the Power to their lowest score of the year. The backlines, led by Matthew Scarlett at full-back, repeatedly turned defence into attack, rushing the ball forward to support the forward line, as evidenced by Scarlett's tally of 29 disposals (tied with Corey Enright for Geelong's most disposals), rare for a team, especially a team who had won by a 100-point-plus margin. Half-forwards Paul Chapman and Steve Johnson kicked four goals each and set up numerous others. Johnson was awarded the Norm Smith Medal for his best-on-ground performance in the grand final after the Cats’ triumph. Chapman's day included a high mark over Port Adelaide captain Warren Tredrea during the third quarter. Key forwards Cameron Mooney (five goals) and Nathan Ablett (three) also performed strongly. Power player Domenic Cassisi performed reasonably well against Geelong star Gary Ablett, Jr.; however, Geelong were still able to dominate the midfield, with Joel Corey, James Kelly, and Cameron Ling all making solid contributions, while Brad Ottens and Steven King both performing strongly in the ruck.

The match ended with Geelong winning by the score of 24.19 (163) to 6.8 (44), recording the greatest winning margin in AFL grand final history, 119 points. This broke the previous record of 96 points set by Hawthorn against Melbourne in the 1988 VFL Grand Final. Geelong's 417 disposals was a new grand final record, while Port Adelaide became the first finals side in history to have more handballs than kicks.

== Aftermath ==
The Cats’ win ended a 44-year premiership drought for the club. Their last flag had come in 1963, and since then the club had lost five grand finals. It was the first premiership won by a team from Victoria since Essendon’s 2000 victory. It was the start of a period of sustained dominance by Geelong, which saw it win three premierships from four grand finals over a five-year period from 2007 to 2011.

As of the conclusion of the 2026 season, this remains the last grand final appearance for Port Adelaide. The success of the 2007 season proved an aberration, as the club's rise from 12th to 2nd on the ladder in 2007 was followed by a drop to 13th in 2008, with Port Adelaide not qualifying for another finals series until the 2013 season.

Because the 44-year drought had been broken, celebrations in the homes, pubs, nightclubs, and streets of Geelong continued throughout the night and into the next day. The day after the grand final, around 30,000 fans turned out to welcome the team back to their home ground at Kardinia Park.

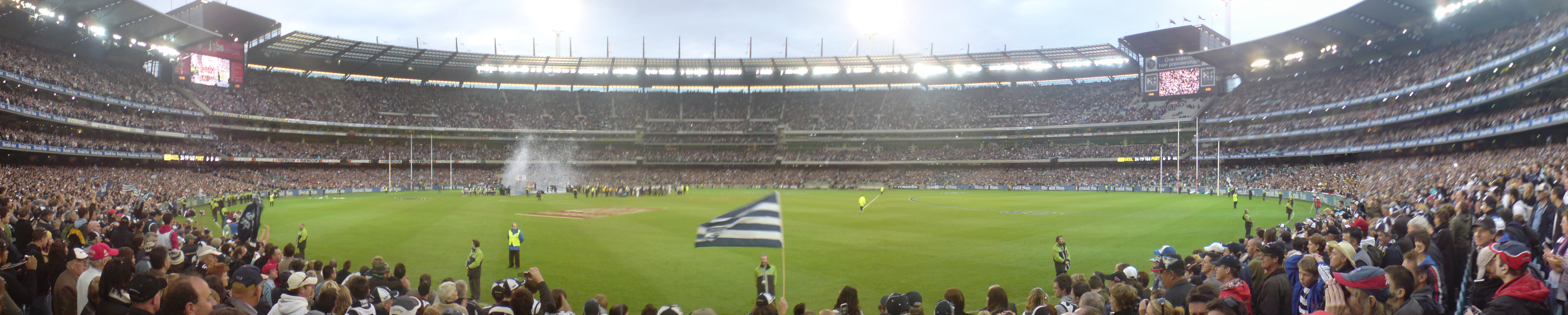

== Norm Smith Medal ==
Norm Smith Medal voting tally
Position	Player	Club	Total votes	Vote summary
1st (winner)	Steve Johnson	Geelong	13	3,3,3,2,2
2nd	Paul Chapman	Geelong	10	3,3,2,1,1
3rd	Matthew Scarlett	Geelong	7	2,2,1,1,1

Steve Johnson was awarded the Norm Smith Medal for being voted as the best-performing player of the match. He recorded 23 disposals, 9 marks, and 4 goals. Also polling were Paul Chapman (21 disposals, 7 marks, and 4 goals), and Matthew Scarlett (29 disposals and 8 marks).

The voters and their choices were as follows:

Voter	Role	3 votes	2 votes	1 vote
Steve Butler	The West Australian	Steve Johnson	Paul Chapman	Matthew Scarlett
Josh Francou	5AA	Paul Chapman	Steve Johnson	Matthew Scarlett
Danny Frawley	Triple M	Steve Johnson	Matthew Scarlett	Paul Chapman
Jake Niall	The Age	Paul Chapman	Steve Johnson	Matthew Scarlett
Daryl Timms	Herald Sun	Steve Johnson	Matthew Scarlett	Paul Chapman

== Scorecard ==
2007 AFL Grand Final
Saturday, 29 September 2007 (2:30 pm)	Geelong	def.	Port Adelaide	MCG (crowd: 97,302)
5.7 (37); 11.13 (79); 18.17 (125); 24.19 (163)	Q1; Q2; Q3; Final	2.2 (14); 4.3 (27); 5.5 (35); 6.8 (44)	Umpires: McBurney (3), McInerney (30), McLaren (11); Norm Smith Medal: Steve Johnson, Geelong; Television broadcast: Network Ten; National anthem: Natalie Bassingthwaighte
Mooney 5, Chapman 4, Johnson 4, N. Ablett 3, Bartel 2, Ottens, Byrnes, G. Ablett, Rooke, Ling, Mackie	Goals	Tredrea 2, S. Burgoyne 2, C. Cornes, Logan
Johnson, Chapman, Scarlett, King, Ottens, Mooney, Corey, Enright, Bartel	Best	Tredrea, P. Burgoyne, K. Cornes
Nil	Injuries	Nil
Nil	Reports	Nil

== Teams ==
Geelong

Geelong
B:	2 Tom Harley (c)	30 Matthew Scarlett	8 Josh Hunt
HB:	4 Andrew Mackie	39 Darren Milburn	40 David Wojcinski
C:	11 Joel Corey	3 Jimmy Bartel	44 Corey Enright
HF:	20 Steve Johnson	21 Cameron Mooney	14 Joel Selwood
F:	35 Paul Chapman	23 Nathan Ablett	27 Mathew Stokes
Foll:	6 Brad Ottens	45 Cameron Ling	29 Gary Ablett Jr.
Int:	1 Steven King	17 Shannon Byrnes	9 James Kelly
Int:	33 Max Rooke		
Coach:	Mark Thompson		

Port Adelaide

Port Adelaide
B:	36 Michael Pettigrew	28 Toby Thurstans	9 Jacob Surjan
HB:	25 Domenic Cassisi	30 Troy Chaplin	7 Peter Burgoyne
C:	3 Steven Salopek	18 Kane Cornes	15 David Rodan
HF:	4 Daniel Motlop	1 Warren Tredrea (c)	16 Danyle Pearce
F:	5 Brendon Lade	39 Justin Westhoff	33 Brett Ebert
Foll:	20 Dean Brogan	35 Chad Cornes	8 Shaun Burgoyne
Int:	10 Travis Boak	23 Brad Symes	44 Tom Logan
Int:	2 Darryl Wakelin		
Coach:	Mark Williams		

== See also ==
- 2007 AFL season
- 2007 AFL finals series
