= Shane McInerney =

Australian rules football field umpire

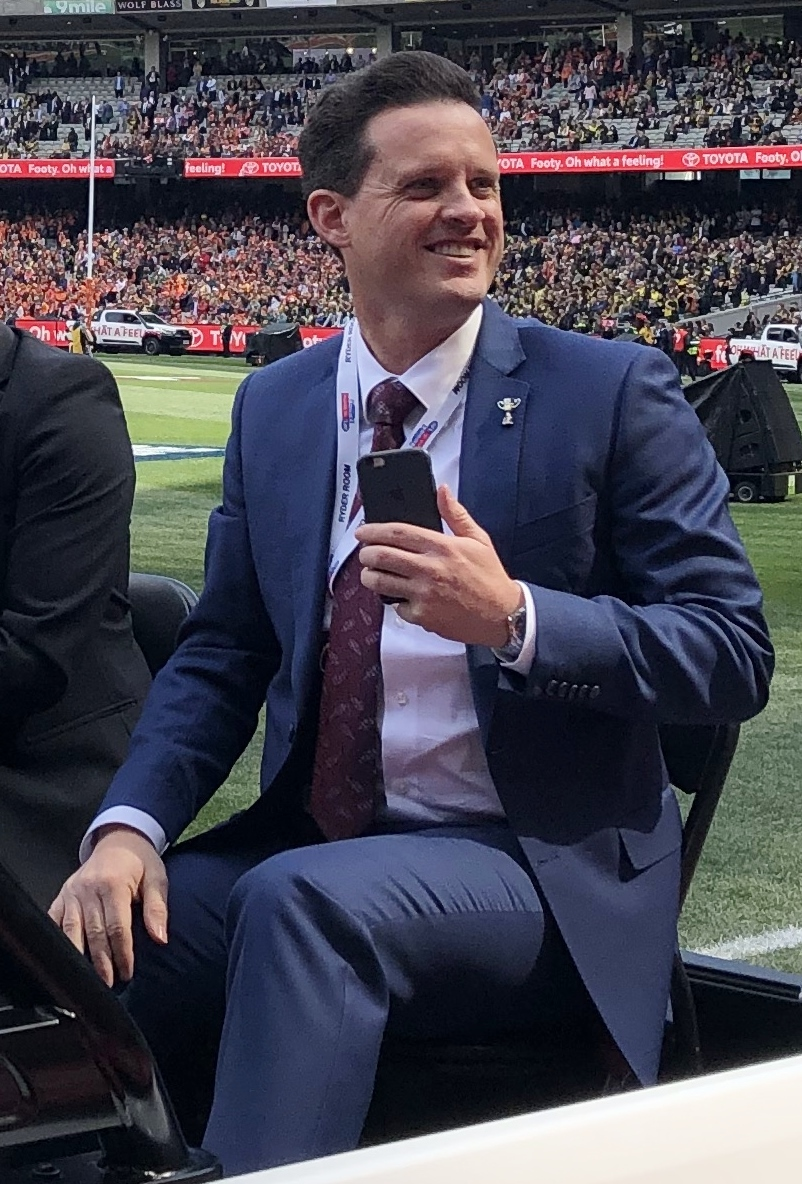
- McInerney at the 2019 AFL Grand Final

Personal information
- Born: October 19, 1970 (age 56)

Umpiring career
Years	League	Role
1994-2019	AFL	Field Umpire

Career highlights
- Grand Final 2004; Grand Final 2007

Shane McInerney (born 19 October 1970) is a former Australian rules football field umpire in the Australian Football League. Active between 1994 and 2019, McInerney umpired in 500 senior VFL/AFL games, the most of any umpire in the league's history. He was raised in Ballarat, Victoria.

McInerney umpired in two grand finals: the 2004 AFL Grand Final alongside Brett Allen and Matthew James, and the 2007 AFL Grand Final alongside Scott McLaren and Stephen McBurney. He umpired a total of 26 AFL finals throughout his career.
