= Martin Ellis (umpire) =

Australian rules football field umpire

Martin Ellis (born 9 May 1969) is a former Australian rules football field umpire in the Australian Football League.

He retired on the 2 September 2008 having umpired a total of 244 career games over 13 seasons, including 8 finals and the 2001 AFL Grand Final. Ellis was also appointed and officiated in Fitzroy's last match against Fremantle at Subiaco Oval in 1996.

He has held the position of Director of Umpiring at the Northern Football League since 2015.
