= Tim Notting =

Australian rules footballer

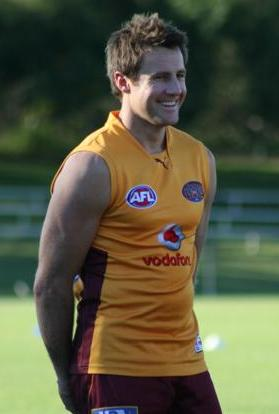
- Notting at a training session in 2007

Personal information
- Full name: Tim Notting
- Nickname: Possum
- Born: 21 October 1978 (age 48); Wycheproof, Victoria
- Original team: Navarre / North Ballarat Rebels
- Draft: 26th overall, 1996 AFL draft
- Height: 188 cm (6 ft 2 in)
- Weight: 89 kg (196 lb)
- Position: Wing

Playing career^{1}
Years	Club	Games (Goals)
1998–2009	Brisbane Lions	208 (138)
- ^{1} Playing statistics correct to the end of 2009.

Career highlights
- 2× AFL premiership player: 2001, 2002; AFL Rising Star nominee: 1999

Tim Notting (born 21 October 1978) is a former two-time premiership winning Australian rules footballer with the Brisbane Lions in the Australian Football League (AFL).

== Early life ==
Notting was born in Wycheproof, Victoria. He moved with his family to Stawell, Victoria where he began playing in the Under 13s before playing for nearby club Navarre at the age of 14. During his final year of high school Notting was invited to play with the North Ballarat Rebels in the TAC Cup competition in 1996. It wasn't until he impressed with North Ballarat that he was invited to the Richmond Football Club's reserves where he played four impressive games before catching the eyes of AFL recruiters. Richmond, however failed to draft the teenager.

== Australian Football League career ==
Notting was recruited by Brisbane with the number 26 draft selection in the 1996 AFL draft from Navarre. Notting is noted for his long right foot kicking, and has played in a variety of positions over his career.

After not managing a senior game in his first year on Brisbane's list in 1997, Notting made his debut for the Brisbane Lions in Round 8, 1998 against Essendon.

He received an AFL Rising Star nomination in 1999 and was a member of Brisbane's first two premierships in 2001 and 2002. In 2003 he missed their third consecutive premiership due to a knee injury, but he returned in 2004, playing in every game, including his 100th game. He also played in Brisbane's loss to Port Adelaide in the 2004 AFL Grand Final.

In 2006, Notting celebrated his 150th game for the Lions in a come-from-behind 10-point win over Hawthorn at the Gabba. It was to be the Lions' last win for the season as they lost their final six games by an average of 51 points.

In 2009 in Round 10, Notting played his 200th game in an 18-point win against North Melbourne at Etihad Stadium. In September 2009, Notting announced his retirement at the season end. He played his last game for the Lions in a 51-point loss to the Western Bulldogs in the First Semi Final at the Melbourne Cricket Ground.

In October 2009, Notting announced that he would join the Labrador Tigers for the 2010 QAFL season.

== Personal life ==
He is married to Australian Olympic swimmer Jodie Henry. They have three children together.

== Statistics ==
Legend
G	Goals	K	Kicks	D	Disposals	T	Tackles
B	Behinds	H	Handballs	M	Marks

Season	Team	No.	Games	Totals							Averages (per game)						
Season	Team	No.	Games	G	B	K	H	D	M	T	G	B	K	H	D	M	T
1998	Brisbane Lions	39	5	0	0	24	30	54	8	7	0.0	0.0	4.8	6.0	10.8	1.6	1.4
1999	Brisbane Lions	39	12	13	10	78	42	120	42	7	1.1	0.8	6.5	3.5	10.0	3.5	0.6
2000	Brisbane Lions	8	11	5	3	72	58	130	38	11	0.5	0.3	6.5	5.3	11.8	3.5	1.0
2001†	Brisbane Lions	8	24	25	25	221	186	407	124	32	1.0	1.0	9.2	7.8	17.0	5.2	1.3
2002†	Brisbane Lions	8	22	14	12	148	123	271	75	49	0.6	0.5	6.7	5.6	12.3	3.4	2.2
2003	Brisbane Lions	8	14	8	7	75	43	118	35	19	0.6	0.5	5.4	3.1	8.4	2.5	1.4
2004	Brisbane Lions	8	25	30	21	177	132	309	89	43	1.2	0.8	7.1	5.3	12.4	3.6	1.7
2005	Brisbane Lions	8	21	14	13	196	146	342	113	37	0.7	0.6	9.3	7.0	16.3	5.4	1.8
2006	Brisbane Lions	8	22	2	14	214	122	336	116	51	0.1	0.6	9.7	5.5	15.3	5.3	2.3
2007	Brisbane Lions	8	22	16	11	275	188	463	133	53	0.7	0.5	12.5	8.5	21.0	6.0	2.4
2008	Brisbane Lions	8	18	5	8	166	144	310	67	52	0.3	0.4	9.2	8.0	17.2	3.7	2.9
2009	Brisbane Lions	8	12	6	1	88	75	163	53	31	0.5	0.1	7.3	6.3	13.6	4.4	2.6
Career			208	138	125	1734	1289	3023	893	392	0.7	0.6	8.3	6.2	14.5	4.3	1.9
