= Steve Johnson (Australian footballer) =

Australian rules footballer (born 1983)

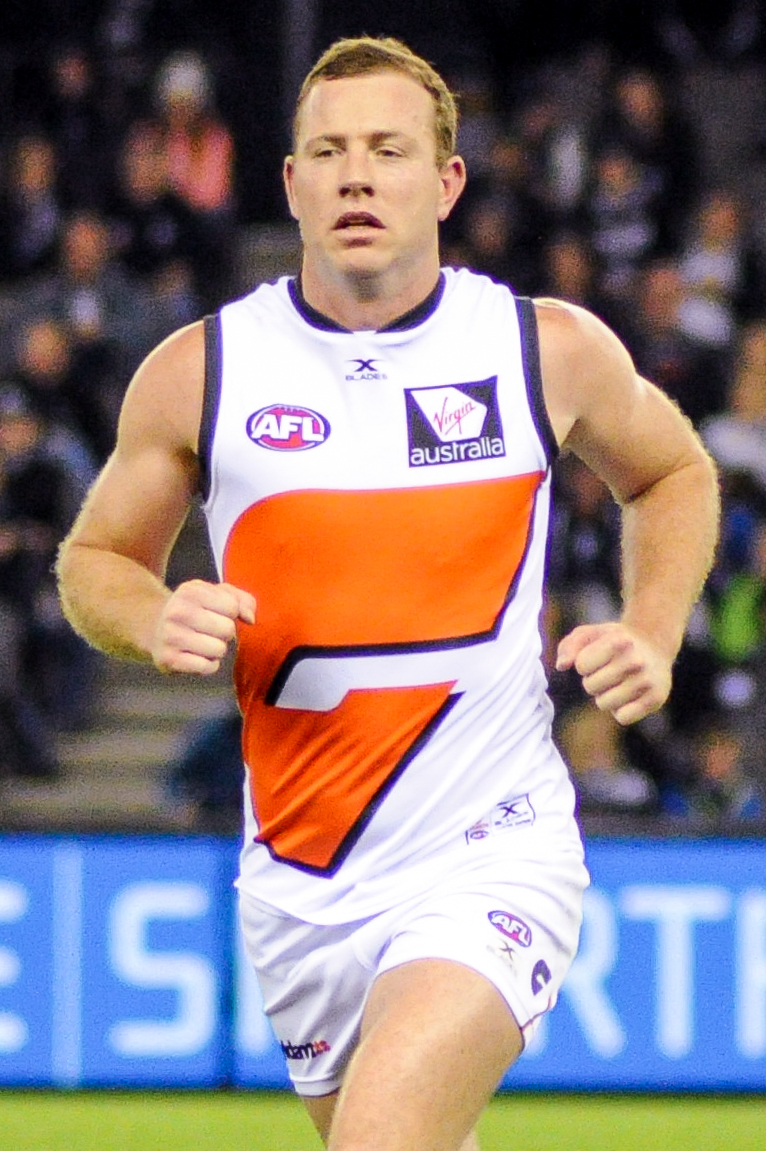
- Johnson with the GWS Giants in June 2017

Personal information
- Full name: Steven Leigh Johnson
- Nickname: Stevie J
- Born: 4 July 1983 (age 43); Wangaratta, Victoria, Australia
- Original teams: Wangaratta (O&MFL); Murray Bushrangers (TAC Cup)
- Draft: No. 24, 2001 national draft
- Height: 189 cm (6 ft 2 in)
- Weight: 95 kg (209 lb)
- Position: Forward

Playing career^{1}
Years	Club	Games (Goals)
2002–2015	Geelong	253 (452)
2016–2017	Greater Western Sydney	40 (64)
Total		293 (516)

Representative team honours^{2}
Years	Team	Games (Goals)
2008	Victoria	1 (3)
- ^{1} Playing statistics correct to the end of 2017.^{2} Representative statistics correct as of 2008.

Career highlights
- 3× AFL premiership player: 2007, 2009, 2011; 3× All-Australian team: 2007, 2008, 2010; Norm Smith Medal: 2007; 2× Geelong leading goalkicker: 2008, 2010; VFL premiership player: 2002

Steven Leigh Johnson (born 4 July 1983) is a former professional Australian rules footballer who played for the Geelong Football Club and the Greater Western Sydney Giants in the Australian Football League (AFL). He was selected by Geelong with pick 24 in the 2001 AFL draft. His first few years were plagued with inconsistency, injury and off-field problems. A medium-sized forward, Johnson is renowned for his freakish ability on the field, where he has consistently wowed fans with his penchant for extraordinary goals.

== Early life and junior football ==
Johnson was born and raised in Wangaratta, Victoria. He played junior football with the Tigers in the Wangaratta Junior Football League and then with Wangaratta Football Club, before moving onto the Murray Bushrangers in the TAC Cup.

== AFL career ==
=== Geelong ===
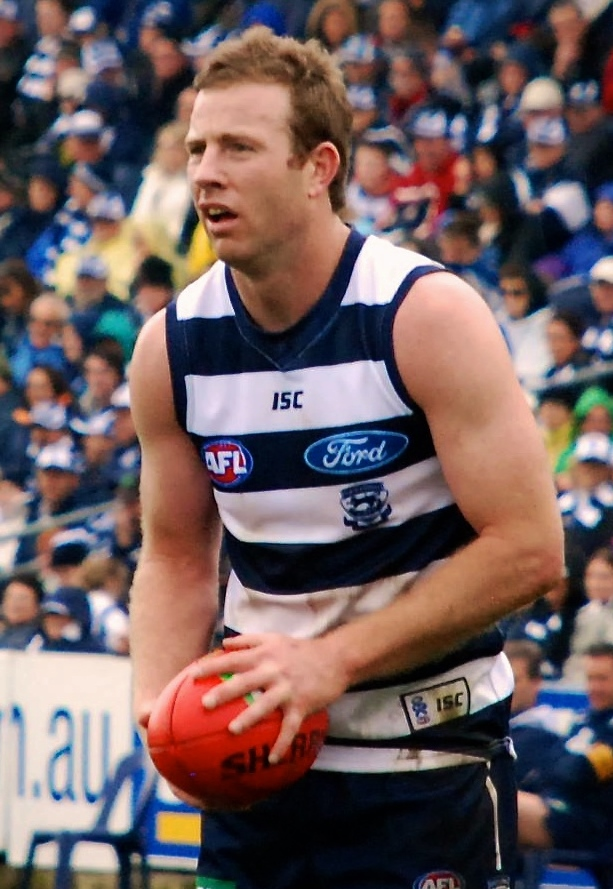
Johnson with Geelong in July 2011

Johnson was suspended by his club for the first five matches of the 2007 season after he was arrested for public drunkenness in Wangaratta on 24 December 2006—a charge which was later dropped. He returned in Round 6 against Richmond where he went on to contribute 21 possessions and two goals in a match Geelong won by 157 points. He went on to post career-best numbers across the board, capped off by All-Australian selection on the half-forward flank in September. His 2007 season was capped off when Johnson lead the Cats to victory in the Grand Final, collecting a premiership medallion, and winning the Norm Smith Medal for best on ground in the Grand Final. Johnson was hailed as a feel-good story for the year, with a good example of a player reforming after disciplinary action.

Early in 2008, Johnson lost his drivers' licence and was sentenced to 50 hours working with the Transport Accident Commission after he was clocked in over 70 km/h over the speed limit in a 50 zone. Teammate Shannon Byrnes was in the car at the time. He had yet another stellar season on-field in 2008, kicking 49 home-and-away season goals and earning a spot on the forward flank in the All-Australian team of 2008. He gathered 34 disposals in the Cats' Grand Final loss to Hawthorn.

In the 2009 AFL season, he played 18 matches and kicked 40 goals, finishing tenth in the Geelong best and fairest award. He was a member of the Cats 2009 Premiership-winning team.

In 2011, Johnson struggled to consistently produce the captivating form that had won him All Australian selection in previous years. He was still a force, though, gaining recognition by being honoured in the initial All-Australian squad of 40. His season nearly came to an abrupt end when, during the third quarter of the Preliminary Final between Geelong and West Coast, he appeared to sustain a serious injury to his left knee. Racing against the clock in order to gain fitness for the Grand Final against the Magpies, it was heavily speculated that Johnson would be unable to gain full fitness in time. For almost the entire week, whilst his teammates trained in the spotlight, Johnson spent time up in Melbourne in a hyperbaric chamber. He recovered, and he played a vital part in the Cats' win over the Pies. He went on to kick 4 goals amongst 14 possessions, thus claiming his third premiership medallion.

=== GWS Giants ===
In October 2015, Johnson signed a one-year contract with Greater Western Sydney. In his first match against his old club in Round 2, Johnson kicked two goals as his new club won by 13 points. On 28 September 2016, Johnson announced he had signed a one-year contract extension with GWS after missing their preliminary final loss due to suspension. Johnson played the final game of his career in the 2017 Preliminary Final, where he collected 15 disposals and 4 marks in a 36-point loss to Richmond.

== Statistics ==
Legend
G	Goals	K	Kicks	D	Disposals	T	Tackles
B	Behinds	H	Handballs	M	Marks
#	Played in that season's premiership team

Season	Team	No.	Games	Totals							Averages (per game)						
Season	Team	No.	Games	G	B	K	H	D	M	T	G	B	K	H	D	M	T
2002	Geelong	20	12	16	12	101	50	151	40	28	1.3	1.0	8.4	4.2	12.6	3.3	2.3
2003	Geelong	20	15	23	12	122	49	171	54	29	1.5	0.8	8.1	3.3	11.4	3.6	1.9
2004	Geelong	20	13	21	19	143	54	197	58	31	1.6	1.5	11.0	4.2	15.2	4.5	2.4
2005	Geelong	20	12	18	15	129	51	180	59	19	1.5	1.3	10.8	4.3	15.0	4.9	1.6
2006	Geelong	20	15	30	13	139	60	199	70	22	2.0	0.9	9.3	4.0	13.3	4.7	1.5
2007^{#}	Geelong	20	20	49	33	286	86	372	144	44	2.5	1.7	14.3	4.3	18.6	7.2	2.2
2008	Geelong	20	25	53	31	333	174	507	147	65	2.1	1.2	13.3	7.0	20.3	5.9	2.6
2009^{#}	Geelong	20	18	40	38	255	103	358	112	44	2.2	2.1	14.2	5.7	19.9	6.2	2.4
2010	Geelong	20	22	63	36	274	136	410	131	50	2.9	1.6	12.5	6.2	18.6	6.0	2.3
2011^{#}	Geelong	20	23	50	37	319	195	514	143	84	2.2	1.6	13.9	8.5	22.3	6.2	3.7
2012	Geelong	20	21	19	17	299	166	465	117	94	0.9	0.8	14.2	7.9	22.1	5.6	4.5
2013	Geelong	20	19	23	23	315	231	546	108	87	1.2	1.2	16.6	12.2	28.7	5.7	4.6
2014	Geelong	20	18	17	14	265	199	464	92	94	0.9	0.8	14.7	11.1	25.8	5.1	5.2
2015	Geelong	20	20	30	25	256	156	412	99	46	1.5	1.3	12.8	7.8	20.6	5.0	2.3
2016	Greater Western Sydney	17	22	43	26	255	152	407	93	63	2.0	1.2	11.6	6.9	18.5	4.2	2.9
2017	Greater Western Sydney	17	18	21	16	159	115	274	79	50	1.2	0.9	8.8	6.4	15.2	4.4	2.8
Career			293	516	367	3650	1977	5627	1546	851	1.8	1.3	12.5	6.7	19.2	5.3	2.9

== Career highlights ==
AFL

- AFL Premiership Player (2007, 2009, 2011)
- Norm Smith Medal (2007)
- All-Australian (2007–2008, 2010)

Geelong

- VFL Premiership Player (2002)
- Geelong Reserves Best First Year Player (2002)

TAC Cup

- All-Australian U/18 (2001)
- Vic Country U/18 (2001)

== Post-playing career ==
Not long after his retirement as an AFL player, Johnson joined the Sydney Swans as an assistant coach.

In October 2022, Johnson signed a two-year contract to become senior coach of the Yarrawonga Football Club in the Ovens & Murray Football Netball League. Johnson coached the Pigeons to the 2023 premiership.

In September 2024, Johnson was appointed as head coach of the Newtown & Chilwell Football Club in the Geelong Football Netball League. In the same month, he presented the Norm Smith Medal to Will Ashcroft in the 2024 AFL Grand Final, the youngest player to win the award in the AFL era of the sport.
