= Cameron Mooney =

Australian rules footballer

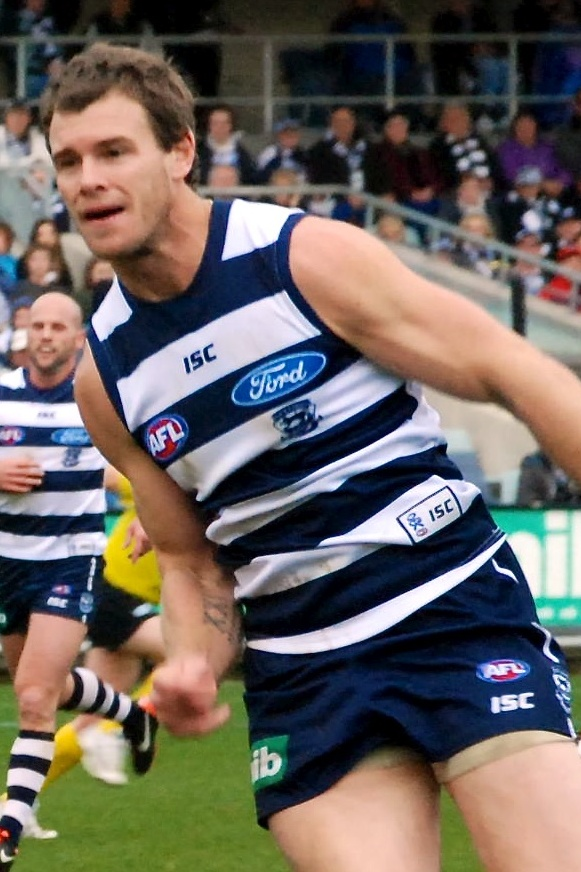
- Mooney in July 2011

Personal information
- Born: 26 September 1979 (age 47); Wagga Wagga, New South Wales
- Original team: Turvey Park (Riverina Football League)
- Draft: No. 56, 1996 National Draft, North Melbourne
- Height: 195 cm (6 ft 5 in)
- Weight: 99 kg (218 lb)
- Position: Forward

Playing career^{1}
Years	Club	Games (Goals)
1997–1999	North Melbourne	11 (2)
2000–2011	Geelong	210 (295)
Total		221 (297)

Representative team honours
Years	Team	Games (Goals)
2008	Dream Team	1 (1)
- ^{1} Playing statistics correct to the end of 2011.

Career highlights
- 3× AFL Premiership: 1999, 2007, 2009; All-Australian team: 2007; 2× Geelong leading goalkicker: 2007, 2009

Cameron Mooney (born 26 September 1979) is a former Australian rules footballer who played with the North Melbourne and Geelong Football Clubs in the Australian Football League (AFL). A forward, standing at 197 cm (6 ft 6 in) Mooney is renowned for his passion along with his poor tribunal history where he holds the record for the most suspensions in a single season by a VFL/AFL player.

Mooney was selected in the 2007 All-Australian Team, and was part of Geelong's AFL premiership-winning team in the same year. He also represented the Dream Team state team in the AFL Hall of Fame Tribute Match in 2008, as well as being the leading goalkicker for Geelong in 2007.

== Early life ==
Cameron Mooney was born in Wagga Wagga and grew up in suburban Turvey Park, where he played junior football with the Turvey Park Football Club, with his brother Jason Mooney, attending Mount Austin High School in his teens. He began playing football with Turvey Park Football Club, later representing the NSW/ACT Rams in the TAC Cup before being taken by the Kangaroos with the 56th overall pick in the 1996 AFL draft.

== Career ==
=== 1999: Kangaroos ===
Mooney made his AFL debut with the Kangaroos during round 7 of his first AFL season against the Adelaide Crows. That year, he was a member of the Kangaroos premiership team which defeated Carlton. However, he did not receive a single touch in this game and spent a large portion of the game on the bench.

=== 2000: Trade to Geelong ===
At the end of 1999, Mooney was part of the trade which saw former Geelong captain, Leigh Colbert head to the Kangaroos, allowing Mooney to end up at Geelong. He was traded along with the 53rd and 67th selection in 1999 AFL draft. This season also saw a Kangaroos assistant coach, Mark Thompson, take up the head coaching job at Geelong.

=== 2004 – 2005 ===
Following four unproductive years off the field, Mooney blossomed in 2004, subsequently catapulting Geelong to premiership contention. In 2005, Mooney's year was interrupted by injury. However, he destroyed Melbourne in the elimination final. The defining snapshot of Mooney's career was after the siren in the semi-final against the Sydney Swans where Geelong lost by 3 points after Nick Davis goaled for Sydney with 2 seconds remaining giving the Swans their first and only lead of the entire game. Mooney was gutted by the result and was openly distressed and weeping.

=== 2006: Suspensions ===
Mooney in 2006, after the heartache of 2005, experienced the relative joy of a pre-season premiership. However, his premiership season was not as fruitful. He was suspended on four occasions, as well as his 100th game resulting in a loss. Geelong lost this game despite leading the West Coast Eagles by 54 points in the third quarter. Due to Mooney being suspended on four occasions in 2006, the Geelong Football Club fining him of a week's wages. This lack of discipline was seen as detrimental to the team despite Mooney's good form. At the end of the 2006 season, Mooney also requested to be traded to another club, though he was convinced to stay at Geelong for another year.

=== 2007: Premiership glory ===
Playing permanently in the forward line for the first time in his senior career, Mooney had an instrumental role as Geelong finished the home and away season atop the ladder. Mooney lead the minor premier's goalkicking with 55 goals, and was rewarded with his first All-Australian selection. He was often regarded at this time as the soul of the club due to his heart-on-sleeve attitude. Mooney capped off a remarkable season in 2007 by finishing the year with 67 goals after booting 5 majors in the record-breaking 119 point premiership victory over Port Adelaide.

=== 2008: Premiership heartbreak ===
Cameron Mooney's good form continued in the 2008 season, he kicked 15 fewer goals though Geelong won 3 more games and kicked an extra 130 points. Although, Mooney's season turned from memorable to forgettable during the 2008 AFL Grand Final.

Mooney started the match well taking a few early marks and ended the first quarter with two goals including one from a difficult snap from the boundary line. All this early good work fell to pieces at half time, when Mooney who seconds before the siren marked the ball about 5 metres out on a slight angle. He too comfortably walked in to kick the goal and sprayed the ball to the left registering a behind, had he kicked a goal Geelong would have gone into half time with a 2-point lead instead of trailing by 3 points.

The second half started just as it ended for Mooney another missed opportunity. This time he was 30 metres out directly in front, and missed another vital goal.

Mooney finished the day with 2 goals 3 behinds from a total of 14 disposals, it was a disappointing day for himself and Geelong.

=== Retirement ===
After a series of injuries that kept him out of the team, Mooney announced his retirement at the end of the 2011 season.

Mooney made a one off guest appearance for the Glenorchy Football Club in the Tasmanian State League in 2012.

Since 2012, Mooney became a commentator on Fox Footy. He is also on Bounce with Jason Dunstall, Andrew Gaze, Bernie Vince, and Ben Dixon.

== Statistics ==
Legend
G	Goals	K	Kicks	D	Disposals	T	Tackles
B	Behinds	H	Handballs	M	Marks
#	Played in that season's premiership team

Season	Team	No.	Games	Totals							Averages (per game)							Votes
Season	Team	No.	Games	G	B	K	H	D	M	T	G	B	K	H	D	M	T	Votes
1999^{#}	Kangaroos	19	11	2	3	25	13	38	14	3	0.2	0.3	2.3	1.2	3.5	1.3	0.3	0
2000	Geelong	21	6	6	3	15	9	24	11	1	1.0	0.5	2.5	1.5	4.0	1.8	0.2	0
2001	Geelong	21	11	3	2	43	39	82	25	15	0.3	0.2	3.9	3.5	7.5	2.3	1.4	0
2002	Geelong	21	19	28	16	126	75	201	88	19	1.5	0.8	6.6	3.9	10.6	4.6	1.0	1
2003	Geelong	21	14	10	14	83	34	117	55	8	0.7	1.0	5.9	2.4	8.4	3.9	0.6	0
2004	Geelong	21	24	12	6	228	147	375	116	35	0.5	0.3	9.5	6.1	15.6	4.8	1.5	3
2005	Geelong	21	17	4	2	184	118	302	101	22	0.2	0.1	10.8	6.9	17.8	5.9	1.3	1
2006	Geelong	21	17	22	8	177	82	259	124	20	1.3	0.5	10.4	4.8	15.2	7.3	1.2	4
2007^{#}	Geelong	21	25	67	38	242	88	330	191	25	2.7	1.5	9.7	3.5	13.2	7.6	1.0	1
2008	Geelong	21	24	52	36	229	116	345	201	24	2.2	1.5	9.5	4.8	14.4	8.4	1.0	3
2009^{#}	Geelong	21	24	46	42	224	97	321	178	28	1.9	1.8	9.3	4.0	13.4	7.4	1.2	2
2010	Geelong	21	21	36	30	182	72	254	131	32	1.7	1.4	8.7	3.4	12.1	6.2	1.5	0
2011	Geelong	21	8	9	8	57	51	108	36	17	1.1	1.0	7.1	6.4	13.5	4.5	2.1	0
Career			221	297	208	1815	941	2756	1271	249	1.3	0.9	8.2	4.3	12.5	5.8	1.1	15

== Honours and achievements ==
Brownlow Medal votes
Season	Votes
1999	—
2000	—
2001	—
2002	1
2003	—
2004	3
2005	1
2006	4
2007	1
2008	3
2009	2
2010	—
2011	—
Total	15
Key:
Red / Italics = Ineligible

Team:

- AFL Premiership (North Melbourne): 1999
- AFL Premiership (Geelong): 2007, 2009
- AFL McClelland Trophy (Geelong): 2007, 2008
- AFL NAB Cup (Geelong): 2006

Individual:

- AFL:
  - All-Australian: 2007
  - Dream Team representative honours in the AFL Hall of Fame Tribute Match: 2008
- Geelong Football Club:
  - Geelong F.C. "Coach's award": 2004
  - Geelong F.C. "Community champion" award: 2006
  - Geelong F.C. "Leading goalkicker" award: 2007, 2009

Milestones:

- North Melbourne:
  - AFL/North Melbourne debut: Round 7, 1999 (vs. Adelaide) at the Melbourne Cricket Ground (North Melbourne won by 56 points)
  - Finals debut: Qualifying final, 1999 (vs. Port Adelaide) at the Melbourne Cricket Ground (North Melbourne won by 44 points)
- Geelong:
  - Geelong debut: Round 17, 2000 (vs. St Kilda) at the Telstra Dome (Geelong lost by 24 points)
  - 50th AFL game: Round 4, 2003 (vs. Melbourne) at Skilled Stadium (Geelong won by 46 points)
  - 50th Geelong game: Round 20, 2003 (vs. West Coast) at Skilled Stadium (Geelong drew with West Coast)
  - 100th AFL game: Round 22, 2005 (vs. Richmond) at Skilled Stadium (Geelong won by 1 point)
  - 100th Geelong game: Round 10, 2006 (vs. West Coast) at Skilled Stadium (Geelong lost by 3 points after leading by 54 points in the 3rd qtr.)
  - 150th AFL game: Round 6, 2008 (vs. Fremantle) at Subiaco Oval (Geelong won by 1 point)
  - 150th Geelong game: Round 18, 2008 (vs. Richmond) at Telstra Dome (Geelong won by 63 points)

== Tribunal history ==
Season	Round	Charge category (level)	Victim	Result	Verdict	Ref(s)
2001	1	Striking	Michael Gardiner (West Coast)	Guilty (lost at tribunal)	2 match suspension	
2001	17	Melee involvement	—	Not guilty (won at tribunal)	—	
2001	19	Striking	Jess Sinclair (North Melbourne)	Guilty (early plea)	3 match suspension	
2003	12	Striking	Graham Polak (Fremantle)	Guilty (lost at tribunal)	2 match suspension	
2004	18	Rough conduct	Leigh Montagna (St Kilda)	Not guilty (won at tribunal)	—	
2005	9	Striking (1)	Corey Jones (North Melbourne)	Guilty (early plea)	1 match suspension	
2005	18	Melee involvement	—	Guilty (accepted fine)	$1,500 fine	
2006	6	Contact with face	Ben Holland (Melbourne)	Guilty (lost at tribunal)	1 match suspension	
2006	15	Striking (2)	Josh Mahoney (Port Adelaide)	Guilty (early plea)	1 match suspension	
2006	17	Charging	Daniel Pratt (Kangaroos)	Guilty (early plea)	1 match suspension	
2006	20	Striking (3)	Amon Buchanan (Sydney)	Guilty (early plea)	2 match suspension	
2008	4	Tripping (1)	Leigh Montagna (St Kilda)	Guilty (won at tribunal)	Reprimand	
2009	8	Striking	Scott Thompson (North Melbourne)	Guilty (early plea)	1 match suspension	
2010	2	Rough conduct	Rick Ladson (Hawthorn)	Guilty (lost at tribunal)	1 match suspension	
2010	14	Striking	Jason Blake (St Kilda)	Guilty (early plea)	2 match suspension	
2011	21	Front-on contact	Graham Johncock (Adelaide)	Guilty (early plea)	1 match suspension	
