= Darren Goldspink =

Australian rules football umpire

Personal information
- Full name: Darren Goldspink
- Born: 12 September 1964 (age 62); Australia

Umpiring career
Years	League	Role	Games
1989–2007	AFL	Field umpire	371

Darren Goldspink (born 12 September 1964) is a former Australian rules football umpire in the Australian Football League who umpired 371 games over 18 seasons, including six AFL Grand Finals.

Goldspink was awarded the prestigious All-Australian Umpire award three times in his career during the years 1993, 1995 and 2005, earning himself an AFL Grand Final appointment on each occasion. He also umpired in the 1998, 2000 and 2006 AFL Grand Finals.

Prior to the 2007 AFL season, Goldspink was dropped by the AFL umpiring panel due to lack of fitness. He returned after attaining the levels required, and he umpired again in Round 10, 2007. Two rounds later (in Round 17), Goldspink umpired his 350th VFL/AFL match, before retiring at the end of the year.

Awards
Preceded by Peter Carey	All Australian Umpire; 1993	Succeeded by David Howlett
Preceded by David Howlett	All Australian Umpire; 1995	Succeeded by Mark Nash
Preceded by Mathew James	All Australian Umpire; 2005	Succeeded by Brett Allen
