= Michael Vozzo =

Australian rules football umpire

Michael 'Billy' Vozzo is a former Australian rules football field umpire in the Australian Football League (AFL). He umpired 281 career games, including the 2006 AFL Grand Final and the 2008 AFL Grand Final.
