= Mathew James (umpire) =

Australian rules football field umpire

Personal information
- Full name: Mathew James
- Born: 7 April 1974 (age 52); Essendon, Victoria

Umpiring career
Years	League	Role	Games
1999–2010	AFL	Field umpire	206

Mathew James (born 7 April 1974 in Essendon, Victoria) is a former Australian rules football field umpire most notably in the Australian Football League (AFL).

== Umpiring career ==
James began umpiring in 1991 with the Footscray District Football League. In 1994 joined the Victorian Football League (VFL) where he umpired until joining the AFL in 1999.

=== AFL ===
His debut AFL match was in Round 1 of the 1999 AFL season between Collingwood and Hawthorn.

In 2001, his third year on the AFL umpire panel, he umpired his first AFL Grand Final. He also umpired the 2002 and 2004 AFL Grand Finals. James was also named the All-Australian Umpire in 2004.

=== International rules ===
He was the Australian referee in two Test matches in the 2005 International Rules Series between Australia and Ireland.

=== Retirement ===
In May 2010, he announced his retirement from umpiring after a persistent calf injury prevented him from umpiring in 2010. He had umpired 206 AFL games, including 16 finals.

Awards
Preceded by Stephen McBurney	All Australian Umpire; 2004	Succeeded by Darren Goldspink
