= Brett Allen =

Australian rules football Field umpire (born 1966)

Personal information
- Full name: Brett Allen
- Born: 14 April 1966 (age 60); Australia

Umpiring career^{4}
Years	League	Role	Games
1992–2007	AFL	Field umpire	346
- ^{4} Umpiring statistics correct as of Round 22, 2007.

Brett Allen (born 14 April 1966) is a retired Australian rules football Field umpire in the Australian Football League. He umpired 346 career games in the AFL since his debut in 1992.

A veteran of the AFL umpiring list, Allen umpired the 1992 reserves grand final in his first season.

Although not accused of doing anything improper, he was involved in the "Whispers in the Sky" controversy as the second umpire, along with Matthew Head, on the flight. He defended Head, saying "Head had made no such comment". Two police officers were appointed to investigate the alleged comments by the umpires, however found nothing regarding the accused bribery.

He is fifth on the AFL umpiring all-time records for the number of finals games officiated, with 33, which is one behind fellow 2007-listed umpire Darren Goldspink. He has also won the All Australian Umpire of the year four times over his AFL career: in 1999, 2000, 2002 and 2006.

He announced his retirement on 5 September 2007, citing the increase in interstate travel and training required to umpire at the highest level.

He was inducted into the Australian Football Hall of Fame in 2017. On 24 October 2000, Allen was awarded the Australian Sports Medal for his contribution to the game.

== Footnotes ==
Awards
Preceded by Andrew Coates	All Australian Umpire; 1999, 2000	Succeeded by Scott McLaren
Preceded by Scott McLaren	All Australian Umpire; 2002	Succeeded by Stephen McBurney
Preceded by Darren Goldspink	All Australian Umpire; 2006	Succeeded by Stephen McBurney
