= Brett Rosebury =

Australian rules football umpire

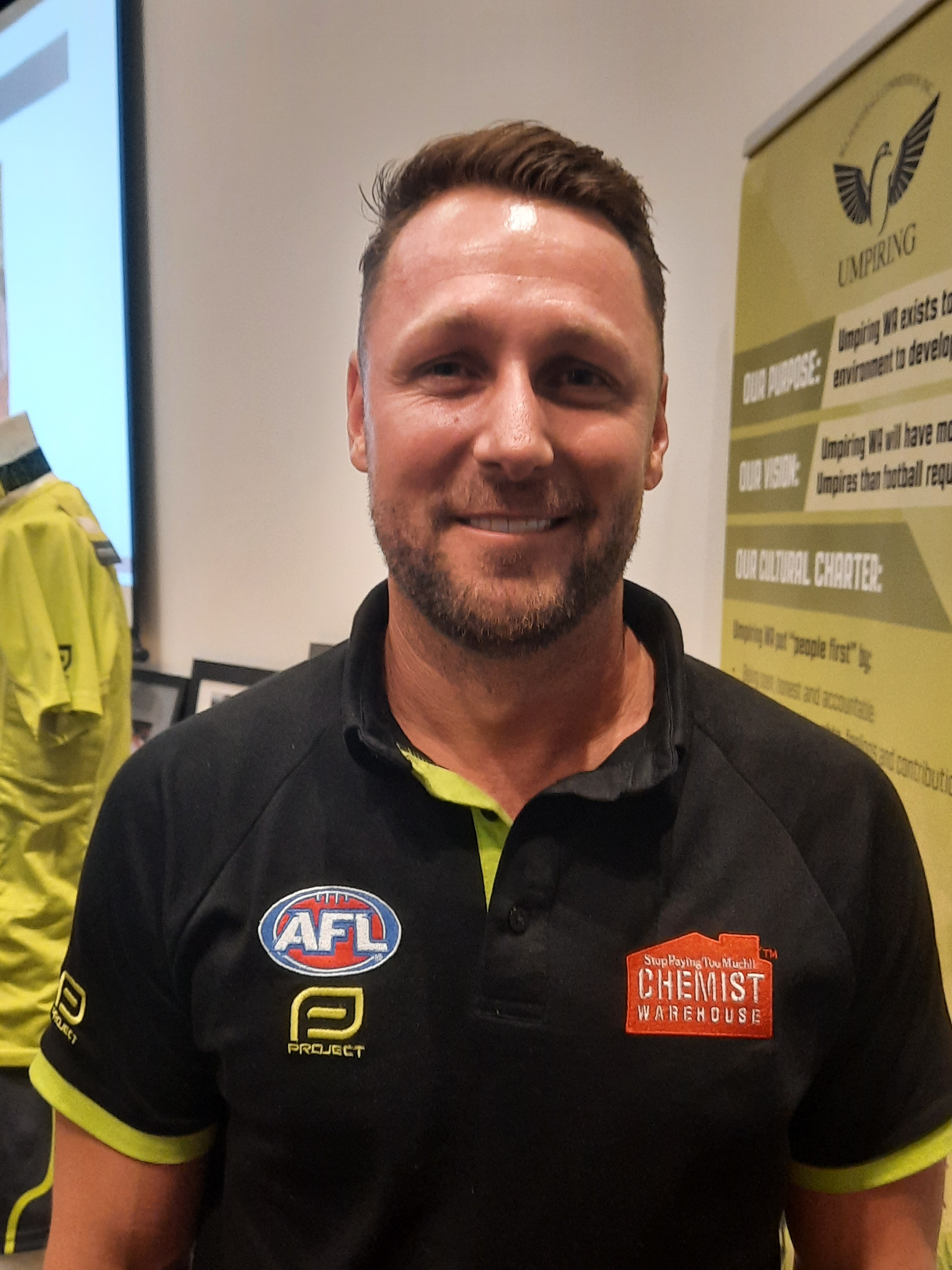
- Brett Rosebury in Jan 2024.

Personal information
- Full name: Brett Rosebury
- Born: 19 March 1980 (age 46)

Umpiring career
Years	League	Role	Games
2000–	AFL	Field umpire	550
1998–2000	WAFL	Field umpire	

Brett Rosebury (born 19 March 1980) is an Australian rules football field umpire in the Australian Football League (AFL).

Over his 26-year career up to the end of the 2025 season, Rosebury has umpired 557 career AFL matches, the most of any umpire in VFL/AFL history. He officiated his 500th AFL game in July 2023.

Rosebury commenced his umpiring career with the South Suburban Junior Football Umpires Association (SSJFUA) in Western Australia, and he umpired his first match in the West Australian Football League (WAFL) at only 18 years of age, which is believed to be a record for the youngest officiating umpire in that league. He umpired the 1999 and 2000 WAFL Grand Finals.

Rosebury was one of four senior AFL umpires appointed during the 2000 AFL season. He is the youngest ever field umpire to officiate in matches at VFL/AFL level.

Rosebury was named the All-Australian Umpire for 2008, but he was not selected to umpire the 2008 grand final, instead serving as the match's emergency umpire. He has since umpired the AFL Grand Final on nine occasions: 2009, 2010 and its replay, 2011, 2012, 2013, 2015, 2018, 2021 and 2026. Skilled at the centre bounce during the time it was still part of the umpires' duties, he has generally performed the grand finals' opening bounces.

Rosebury was a clerk with a mining company before being enlisted by the AFL, and now works as the Head Operations Accountant at Ticketmaster.

Awards
Preceded by Stephen McBurney	All Australian Umpire; 2008, 2009	Succeeded by Shaun Ryan
