= Scott McLaren =

Australian rules football umpire

Personal information
- Full name: Scott McLaren
- Born: 11 April 1968 (age 58)

Umpiring career
Years	League	Role	Games
1986–2010	AFL	Field umpire	365

Scott McLaren (born 11 April 1968) is a former Australian rules football field umpire in the Australian Football League (AFL). He umpired 328 career games in the AFL.

McLaren was awarded the All-Australian Umpire award in 2001, as well as his second AFL Grand Final appointment in the same year. McLaren also umpired in the 1999, 2005, 2007 and 2008 AFL Grand Finals.

In 2003, Scott McLaren became only the second umpire in the history of the AFL to umpire over 100 consecutive games, breaking Jack Elder's earlier record of 102 games later that season. As of 2006, McLaren still held the record with 177.

In 2010, McLaren was stood down for one game after the Round 6 game between Essendon and Hawthorn after he made several mistakes. McLaren announced his retirement from umpiring at the end of 2010. His last match was Melbourne vs North Melbourne at the Melbourne Cricket Ground.

== Footnotes ==
Awards
Preceded by Brett Allen	All-Australian Umpire; 2001	Succeeded by Brett Allen
