= Stephen McBurney =

Australian rules football umpire

Personal information
- Full name: Stephen McBurney
- Nickname: Steve
- Born: 14 November 1967 (age 58)

Umpiring career
Years	League	Role	Games
1995–2013	AFL	Field Umpire	401

Stephen McBurney (born 14 November 1967) is a former Australian rules football field umpire in the Australian Football League, and the most recent Australian Building and Construction Commissioner between February 2018 and February 2023.

In his umpiring career, he umpired 383 career games in the AFL, up to the completion of the 2011 AFL season.

McBurney was named the All Australian Umpire for the 2003 and 2007 seasons and umpired the AFL Grand Final in 2002, 2003, 2007 and 2009.

== Footnotes ==
Awards
Preceded by Brett Allen	All Australian Umpire; 2003	Succeeded by Mathew James
Preceded by Brett Allen	All Australian Umpire; 2007	Succeeded by Brett Rosebury
