= Single-elimination tournament =

Tournament format in which the loser of each match-up is immediately eliminated

A single-elimination knockout, or sudden-death tournament is a type of elimination tournament where the loser of a match-up is immediately eliminated from the tournament. Each winner will play another in the next round, until the final match-up, whose winner becomes the tournament champion(s). Some match-ups may be a single match or several, for example two-legged ties in European sports or best-of series in Northern American professional sports. Defeated competitors may play no further part after losing, or may participate in "consolation" or "classification" matches against other losers to determine the lower final rankings; for example, a third place playoff between losing semi-finalists. In a shootout poker tournament, there are more than two players competing at each table, and sometimes more than one progresses to the next round. Some competitions are held with a pure single-elimination tournament system. Others have many phases, with the last being a single-elimination final stage, often called playoffs.

The format is widely used in racket-based sports (including tennis and badminton), in major combat sport tournaments (including wrestling and amateur boxing), and in association football and handball where it is used for many of the annual cup tournaments that are played alongside the national round-robin tournament leagues. In North American team sports, the format is most known from the NCAA basketball championships.

== Nomenclature ==
In English, the round in which only eight competitors remain is generally called (with or without hyphenation) the quarter-final round; this is followed by the semi-final round, in which only four are left, the two winners of which then meet in the final or championship round.

The round before the quarterfinals has multiple designations. Often it is called the round of sixteen, last sixteen, or (in South Asia) pre-quarterfinals. In many other languages the term for these eight matches translates to eighth-final (e.g., "huitième de finale" in French, "achtste finale" in Dutch, octavos de final in Spanish, Achtelfinale in German, åttondelsfinal in Swedish, ottavi di finale in Italian, oitavos-de-final in Portuguese, optimi de finală in Romanian, osmifinále in Czech, osemfinále in Slovak, and osmina finala in Serbo-Croatian), though this term is rare in English itself, with noticeable use in American debate tournaments.

The round before the round of sixteen is sometimes called round of thirty-two in English. Terms for this in other languages generally translate as "sixteenth final".

Earlier rounds are typically numbered counting forwards from the first round, or by the number of remaining competitors. If some competitors get a bye, the round at which they enter may be named the first round, with the earlier matches called a preliminary round, qualifying round, opening round, or the play-in games.

Examples of the diverse names given to concurrent rounds in various select disciplines:

By competitors	Fraction of final	Grand Slam tennis (Note: In singles only (the other disciplines have fewer rounds))	FA Cup football	Coupe de France	NCAA Men's Basketball	North American Debating Championship	Snooker
Round of 2	Final	Final	Final	Final	National Championship	Final	Final
Round of 4	Semifinals	Semifinals	Semi-finals	Semifinals	Final Four (National semifinals) (Note: The NCAA also uses the "final four" terminology in the Division I women's tournament, as well as the Division III tournaments for both men and women. In Division II for both sexes, this round is called the "semifinals"; both championship events in that division consist of eight teams instead of four.)	Semifinals	Semi-finals
Round of 8	Quarterfinals	Quarterfinals	Quarter-finals (Note: The quarter-finals were called the "sixth round" until 2016–17, the first in which replays were discontinued for this round.)	Quarterfinals	Elite Eight (Regional finals) (Note: In the Division II men's and women's tournaments, the Elite Eight is the championship event, with all qualifying teams participating at a single site. The NCAA does not use "Elite Eight" in Division III, simply calling this round the "regional finals".)	Quarterfinals	Quarter-finals
Round of 16	Octofinals	Round of 16 (US Open), 4th round	5th round (Note: The first to fifth rounds are often called the "first/second/etc. round proper", to distinguish them from the "first/second/etc. qualifying round".)	8th-finals	Sweet Sixteen (Regional semifinals) (Note: The NCAA only uses the term "Sweet Sixteen" in the Division I tournaments.)	Round 7	Last 16
Round of 32	16th-finals	3rd round	4th round	16th-finals	3rd/2nd round (Note: Starting in 2011, 68 teams played in the Championship, with four play-in games, nicknamed the First Four, before the top 60 teams enter at the round of 64. (From 2001 to 2010, there was a single "opening round" game before the round of 64.) The NCAA originally called the First Four the first round, making the rounds of 64 and 32 the second and third rounds respectively; in 2014 it announced that from 2016 it would revert to calling the rounds of 64 and 32 the first and second rounds.) (Note: Since the NCAA Division I women's tournament expanded beyond 32 teams in 1986, the round of 32 has always been called the "second round", and the preceding round the "first round". The women's tournament involved 64 teams from 1994-2021 before expanding to 68 in 2022.)	Round 6	Last 32
Round of 64	32nd-finals	2nd round	3rd round	32nd-finals	2nd/1st round	Round 5	Last 64
Round of 128	64th-finals	1st round	2nd round (Note: The FA Cup 2nd round involves 40 teams, of which 20 qualify for the 3rd round, to which the top 44 teams will have received byes.)	8th qualifying round (Note: The 8th qualifying round involves 88 teams, of which 44 qualify for the 32nd-finals, to which the top 20 teams will have received byes.)	First Four	Round 4 (Note: The number of eligible teams is typically less than 128, but more than 64, so not all teams play this round.)	Last 128

== Example ==
The knockout round of the 2002 FIFA World Cup tournament:

Round of 16
15 June – Seogwipo
Germany	1
Paraguay	0
17 June – Jeonju
Mexico	0
United States	2
16 June – Suwon
Spain (p)	1 (3)
Republic of Ireland	1 (2)
18 June – Daejeon
South Korea (a.s.d.e.t.)	2
Italy	1
15 June – Niigata
Denmark	0
England	3
17 June – Kobe
Brazil	2
Belgium	0
16 June – Ōita
Sweden	1
Senegal (a.s.d.e.t.)	2
18 June – Miyagi
Japan	0
Turkey	1

Quarterfinals
21 June – Ulsan
Germany	1
United States	0
22 June – Gwangju
Spain	0 (3)
South Korea (p)	0 (5)
21 June – Shizuoka
England	1
Brazil	2
22 June – Osaka
Senegal	0
Turkey (a.s.d.e.t.)	1

Semifinals
25 June – Seoul
Germany	1
South Korea	0
26 June – Saitama
Brazil	1
Turkey	0

Final
30 June – Yokohama
Germany	0
Brazil	2
Third place playoff
29 June – Daegu
South Korea	2
Turkey	3

== Classification ==
Without any additional matches, the only positions a single-elimination tournament can reliably determine are first and second – for example, if sorting the numbers 1–4 ascending, if 4 and 3 meet in the first round, 3 and 1 will lose in the first round and 2 will lose in the second, selecting 4 as the largest number in the set, but insufficient comparisons have been performed to determine which is greater, 1 or 3. Despite this, the candidate that loses in the final round is commonly considered to have taken second place (in this case, 2). When matches are held to determine places or prizes lower than first and second, these typically include a match between the losers of the semifinal matches called third place playoffs, the winner therein placing third and the loser fourth. Many Olympic single-elimination tournaments feature the bronze medal match if they do not award bronze medals to both losing semifinalists. The FIFA World Cup has long featured the third place match (since 1934), though the UEFA Euro has not held one since the 1980 edition, and the FIFA Club World Cup has not held one since the 2025 edition.

Sometimes, contests are also held among the losers of the quarterfinal matches to determine fifth to eighth places. In one scenario, two "consolation semifinal" matches may be conducted, with the winners of these then facing off to determine fifth and sixth places and the losers playing for seventh and eighth; those are used often in qualifying tournaments where only the top five teams advance to the next round; or some method of ranking the four quarterfinal losers might be employed, in which case only one round of additional matches would be held among them, the two highest-ranked therein then playing for fifth and sixth places and the two lowest for seventh and eighth.

The number of distinct ways of arranging a single-elimination tournament (as an abstract structure, prior to seeding the players into the tournament) is given by the Wedderburn–Etherington numbers. Thus, for instance, there are three different arrangements for five players:

- The players may be divided into brackets of two and three players, the winners of which meet in the final game
- The bottom four players may play a two-round tournament, the winner of which plays the top player
- The bottom two players may meet, after which each subsequent game pairs the winner of the previous game with the next player

However, the number of arrangements grows quickly for larger numbers of players and not all of them are commonly used.

== Seeding ==
Opponents may be allocated randomly (such as in the FA Cup); however, since the "luck of the draw" may result in the highest-rated competitors being scheduled to face each other early in the competition, seeding is often used to prevent this. Brackets are set up so that the top two seeds could not possibly meet until the final round (should both advance that far), none of the top four can meet prior to the semifinals, and so on. If no seeding is used, the tournament is called a random knockout tournament.

Standard seeding pairs the highest and lowest, then second highest and second lowest and so on, for an 8 seed tournament this is 1 v 8, 2 v 7, 3 v 6 and 4 v 5, for example this is used for 16 seeds in the World Snooker Championship and 32 seeds in the World Darts Championship. Some tournaments stray from this, for example it is not the procedure that is followed in most tennis tournaments, where the 1 and 2 seeds are placed in separate brackets, but then the 3 and 4 seeds are assigned to their brackets randomly, and so too are seeds 5 through 8, and so on. This may result in some brackets consisting of stronger players than other brackets, and since only the top 32 players of 128 are seeded in Tennis Grand Slam tournaments, it can happen that the 33rd-best player in a 128-player field could end up playing the top seed in the first round. An example of this occurring was when World No. 33 Florian Mayer was drawn against, and defeated by, World No. 1 Novak Djokovic in the first round of the 2013 Wimbledon Championships, in what was also a rematch of a quarter-final from the previous year.

Sometimes the remaining competitors in a single-elimination tournament will be "re-seeded" so that the highest surviving seed is made to play the lowest surviving seed in the next round, the second-highest plays the second-lowest, etc. This may be done after each round, or only at selected intervals. In American team sports, for example, the NFL employs this tactic, but MLS, NHL and the NBA do not (and neither does the NCAA college basketball tournament). Although MLB does have enough teams (12) in its playoff tournament where re-seeding would have made a large difference in the match-ups; only the WNBA's at the minimum, which is at least four from each conference for a total of 8. The NBA's format calls for the winner of the first-round series between the first and eighth seeds (within each of the two conferences the league has) to face the winner of the first-round series between the fourth and fifth seeds in the next round, even if one or more of the top three seeds had been upset in their first-round series; critics have claimed that this gives a team fighting for the fifth and sixth seeding positions near the end of the regular season an incentive to tank (deliberately lose) games, so as to finish sixth and thus avoid a possible match-up with the top seed until one round later. MLS' format is identical, except that the conference quarterfinals is a best-of-three series.

In some situations, a seeding restriction may be implemented; from 1975 until 1989 in the NFL, and from 1994 until 2011 in MLB there was a rule where at the conference or league semifinal, should the top seed and last seed (wild card) be from the same division, they cannot play each other; in that case, the top seed plays the worst division champion; the second-best division champion plays the wild card team. This is due to the scheduling employed for the regular season, in which a team faces any given divisional opponent more often than any given non-divisional opponent – the tournament favors match-ups that took place fewer times in the regular season (or did not take place, in some cases).

In international fencing competitions, it is common to have a group stage. Participants are divided in groups of 6–7 fencers who play a round-robin tournament, and a ranking is calculated from the consolidated group results. Single elimination is seeded from this ranking.

== Evaluation ==
The single-elimination format enables a relatively large number of competitors to participate. There are no "dead" matches (perhaps excluding "classification" matches), and no matches where one competitor has more to play for than the other. If a small number of teams play in a single elimination tournament, sometimes a consolation bracket is included to allow the eliminated teams to play more than once. This was the format of the Little League World Series until 1992.

The format is less suited to games where draws are frequent. In chess, each fixture in a single-elimination tournament must be played over multiple matches, because draws are common, and because white has an advantage over black. In association football, games ending in a draw may be settled in extra time and eventually by a penalty shootout or by replaying the fixture.

Another perceived disadvantage is that most competitors are eliminated after relatively few games. Variations such as the double-elimination tournament allow competitors a single loss while remaining eligible for overall victory. However, losing one game requires the competitor to win more games in order to win the tournament.

In a single-elimination tournament without any seeding, awarding the second place to the loser of the final is unjustified: any of the competitors knocked out before getting to play the losing finalist might have been stronger than the actual losing finalist. In general, it is only fair to use a single-elimination tournament to determine first place. To fairly determine lower places requires some form of round-robin in which each player/team gets the opportunity to face every other player/team.

Also, if the competitors' performance is variable, that is, it depends on a small, varying factor in addition to the actual strength of the competitors, then not only will it become less likely that the strongest competitor actually wins the tournament, in addition the seeding done by the tournament organizers will play a major part in deciding the winner. As a random factor is always present in a real-world competition, this might easily cause accusations of unfairness.

== Other tournament systems ==
Variations of the single-elimination tournament include:

- Double-elimination tournament
- McIntyre system, a group of tournament formats that combine features of single- and double-elimination tournaments. Varieties of this system include:
  - Page playoff system (four teams)
  - Top five play-offs
  - McIntyre final eight system
  - Super League play-offs, which formerly used a McIntyre final eight variant
  - AFL final eight system, another variant of the McIntyre final eight, currently used by the Australian Football League and the National Rugby League

Other common tournament types include:

- Round-robin tournament
- Swiss-system tournament
