= Bye (sports) =

Term for missing a match in sports

In sport, a bye or bye week occurs when a player or team is not scheduled to play a match, at a time when other opponents are playing or when a match would otherwise be expected to occur.

Many different scenarios are regionally described as byes, including:

- The preferential advancement of a player or team to the next round of a tournament without playing an opponent in an early round, usually as a reward for higher pre-tournament ranking;
- In round-robin tournaments, when one competitor gets a bye in each round due to an odd number of competitors, as it is impossible for all competitors to play in the same round.
- In league sports with weekly regular-season play, when a team is not scheduled to play on a given week or fixture in the regular competition period, either to balance an odd number of teams, or as a scheduled rest break.
- A scheduled full week's break in a regular league sport's competition in which no matches are played.

== Elimination tournaments ==
In a standard single-elimination tournament bracket, in which the winner of each match progresses and the loser is eliminated, the initial number of participants must be power of two (e.g. 16 or 32) for all competitors to begin in the same round. If the number of competitors is not a power of two, a working bracket requires that byes be provided to automatically move some participants into a later round without requiring them to compete in an earlier one.

Most commonly, when participants have been ranked prior to the tournament, the highest ranked competitors are given a bye to the second round, in order to bring the number of teams back to a power of two as early in the tournament as possible. In league competitions which end with a playoffs tournament, this serves as an earned advantage, since it guarantees at least one week's deeper progression to the playoffs and higher probability of winning the championship. For example, in the 14-team NFL playoffs since 2020, the team with the best record in each of the two conferences is given a bye to the second round.

Some single-elimination playoff tournaments include double-byes, in which the highest ranked competitors receive the further advantage of advancing directly to the third round, or beyond.

Standalone open knock-out tournaments (i.e. those which do not serve as playoffs to a league season) often see even greater numbers of byes, with the highest ranked teams entering well after the third round. This is common in European knock-out tournaments which are open to clubs at all levels of their league pyramids. The English FA Cup, for example, is a 12-round single-elimination tournament (four qualifying rounds and eight proper rounds); the 44 clubs from the top level Premier League and second level EFL Championship receive six byes through to the third proper round, and other levels also receive multiple byes; only level 7–10 clubs enter the competition from its first qualifying round. This method ensures generally competitive games throughout the tournament; by comparison, a conventional single-elimination tournament with all clubs entering in the first round or with a single bye to the second round would frequently see top level professional clubs facing outmatched semi-professional regional clubs throughout the early rounds.

== Byes in non-single elimination tournaments ==
Tournament brackets with greater complexity than single-elimination often include byes as part of the bracket.

Systems which combine elements single- and double-elimination brackets, such as the Page playoff system or AFL final eight system, have byes in later weeks of the tournament rather than earlier weeks. Higher ranked teams play off in the early rounds to earn a bye, with the loser entering the single-elimination part of the bracket immediately and the winner advancing to the subsequent week.

In a Swiss-system tournament of chess with an odd number of players, one player gets a bye in each round, but not all players will get a bye as there are fewer rounds than there are players. FIDE specifies that "pairing-allocated" byes in their sanctioned chess tournaments may not be awarded multiple times to the same participant. Contrasting use in some single-elimination brackets, the byes are to be allocated to the lowest-rated eligible player in the pool.

== Bye weeks in leagues and rounds-robin ==
In many professional sports, any week during a regular season when a team does not play a game may be known as its bye or bye week. This may also be known as an "off week", "idle week" or "open date". A league-wide break during which no matches at all are played may also be called a bye.

It is necessary for at least one team to have a bye each week if the league or round-robin has an odd number of teams, but byes may also be scheduled when there is an even number of teams. This is usually done near the middle of the season, staggered among the teams, so that the league still has most of its full count of games on each individual week. This serves two functions: for the teams, it provides a pre-scheduled rest break to its players; and for the league, it allows for the extension of the season across more weeks without increased load on players. For example, in the NFL, each team has one bye week, usually falling between week 4 and week 12, which was first introduced in 1990, to provide an extra week of televisable matches for a new broadcast deal, without adding an extra game to the players' schedules and introducing a rest break for players. Scheduled bye weeks also provide leagues with some flexibility to make up a postponed or cancelled match with lessened disruption to other teams.

Many professional collective bargaining agreements allow that players be given time off away from their clubs coinciding with midseason bye weeks, rather than it being a week of full training with no match on the weekend.

As a result of byes, teams will have played different numbers of matches at the end of any given week. There are different ways of handling this in league tables, including: ranking teams on percentage of matches won; or, crediting teams with the same number of competition points they would have earned for a win.

== Impact of bye weeks ==
Historically, bye weeks were considered beneficial, providing teams an opportunity to rest and strategize, potentially improving their performance in the subsequent game. Studies of NFL matches from 2002 to 2010 indicated that teams returning from a bye week had a significant 2.2-point advantage over teams without this break; this diminished from 2012 to 2023 to just 0.3 points, coinciding with the 2011 collective bargaining amendment which gave NFL players time away from practice during the bye.

League-wide byes have also been observed to have an equalising effect between higher and lower ranked teams. This was noted in the Australian Football League, which introduced a league-wide bye between the league season and the finals tournament in 2016; over the first decade of the pre-finals bye, there was a marked reduction in the number of higher-ranked clubs who went undefeated through the finals to the grand final, and an increase in lower-ranked clubs who progressed to the later weeks.
