= AFL finals series =

Playoff matches of Australian Rules Football

The Australian Football League finals series, more generally known as the AFL finals, and known from 1897 until 1989 as the Victorian Football League finals series or VFL finals, is a playoff tournament held at the end of each AFL season to determine the premier. Based on the home-and-away season results, the top teams qualify for the finals which culminate in the AFL Grand Final. The finals series is traditionally held throughout September.

The finals have been conducted under the AFL finals system since 2000, the final eight system until 2025, expanding to ten teams in 2026. When the Victorian Football League was established in 1897 the league experimented with different systems before utilising the four-team Argus finals system from 1901 until 1930. Different variations of the McIntyre system were used from 1931 until 1999, beginning with four teams and expanding gradually to ten. These systems have typically been combinations of single- and double elimination tournaments designed to give higher ranked teams an easier path to the premiership.

== Inception ==
The Victorian Football League was established at the end of 1896 by eight clubs which seceded from the Victorian Football Association, which had previously been the peak competition and administrative body for football in Victoria. As part of its arrangements, the league introduced a system of finals in its inaugural season, to be contested after the home-and-away matches by the top four teams. The new system meant that the premiership could not be decided until the final match had been played, generating greater public interest at the end of the season; by comparison, the VFA system awarded the premiership to the team with the best win–loss record across the season, with the provision for a single playoff match only if two teams were tied for first place. Additionally, it was arranged that the gate from finals matches be shared amongst all teams, guaranteeing a better dividend to the league's weaker clubs.

=== Systems ===
The VFL/AFL has used a total of twelve different finals tournament systems in its history. This number is set to grow to thirteen after the 2026 season:

- 1897 (top four) – the top four played a three-week round-robin series; the premiership was won by either the undefeated winner of the round-robin, or by the winner of a grand final between the top two if no team was undefeated
- 1898–1900 (full participation) – 1898 VFL finals system
- 1901 (top four) – First Argus system
- 1902–1907 (top four) – First amended Argus system
- 1908–1923, 1925–1930 (top four) – Second amended Argus system
- 1924 (top four) – Round-robin system with challenge
- 1931–1971 (top four) – Page–McIntyre system
- 1972–1990 (top five) – McIntyre final five system
- 1991 (top six) – First McIntyre final six system
- 1992–1993 (top six) – Second McIntyre final six system
- 1994–1999 (top eight) – McIntyre final eight system
- 2000–2025 (top eight) – AFL final eight system
- 2026–present (top ten) – AFL final ten system

== Venues ==
=== Current system ===
With the exception of the AFL Grand Final (which is contracted to be staged at the Melbourne Cricket Ground), finals matches are played in the state of the home team, giving a home state advantage to the higher placed team. Venue contracts for finals matches are held by the AFL and are not related to the clubs' home venue contracts; consequently, the home team is not necessarily entitled to play at its usual home venue if the AFL's finals contracts are held with a different venue in its state.

Under the current arrangement, all Victorian finals matches are scheduled at the MCG – except in cases when two finals are to be held in Victoria on the same day, in which case Docklands Stadium or (in the event of Geelong being the home team) Kardinia Park may be used for the match expected to draw the lower crowd.

The current contract requires that at least ten finals matches (plus all grand finals) be played at the MCG during every rolling five-year period. This stipulation could require the AFL to schedule a non-Victorian team's home match at the MCG to meet the quota, in the event that non-Victorian teams dominate the competition for an extended period.

Based on the current contract between the AFL and the Victorian Government, the grand final will be played at the Melbourne Cricket Ground every year until at least 2059, regardless of the states of origin of the teams involved.

=== History ===
In the early years of the VFL finals, matches were generally played at neutral suburban venues. Starting from 1902, the Melbourne Cricket Ground became the primary venue for finals, including grand finals, and from 1908, when all finals were played on different days, it became the sole venue for finals (except from 1942 until 1945, when it was commandeered for military use during World War II). Long term contracts were signed between the Melbourne Cricket Club and the VFL for use of the venue in finals, including a ten-year deal running from 1932 to 1941, followed by a deal running until 1956, and a subsequent deal ending in 1971. The VFL always resented the arrangement, as the MCC held most of the negotiating leverage and ended up with the more favourable deal in the contract, and the VFL sought actively to break its reliance on the deal.

The opening in 1970 of the VFL-owned VFL Park with a capacity for almost 80,000 spectators gave the league a viable new finals venue. In November 1971, the VFL signed a new three-year deal for finals to be played at the MCG; but shortly afterwards it announced the expansion of the finals to the McIntyre final five system to provide two new finals matches which could be staged at VFL Park while still fulfilling the requirement for four finals at the MCG. It became standard to stage the elimination final and second semi-final at VFL Park; and in 1975 (after the three-year contract signed in November 1971 had ended), a new agreement shifted the preliminary final to VFL Park also, resulting in three matches at each venue during the finals. This arrangement persisted from 1975 until 1990. Attempts were made during the late 1970s and early 1980s to shift the grand final to VFL Park, but a bitter political struggle which included the Cain State Government ultimately blocked this move at the end of 1983.

As the Melbourne Cricket Ground was the home of Melbourne (and from 1965 onwards Richmond), those teams automatically held a home ground advantage in the finals. Prior to the nationalisation of the league, it was considered philosophically desirable that the finals be played on neutral ground, and one club delegate went as far as proposing in 1961 – after Melbourne had won five premierships in six years – that the MCG's goal posts should be moved prior to each Melbourne finals match to nullify its home ground advantage (the idea was overwhelmingly voted down and the delegate was roundly laughed at for his suggestion). The desire for neutral venues persisted, and from 1977 until 1986, a rule existed requiring that any finals featuring Melbourne or Richmond, other than the grand final, would be played at VFL Park instead of the MCG.

Two events in 1987 changed the nature of finals scheduling:

- Firstly, the VFL expanded interstate to become the Australian Football League, introducing the desire to allow non-Victorian clubs to host finals in their home states and reversing the traditional notion that finals should be held in neutral locations.
- Secondly, the AFL and the MCC agreed to terms to jointly fund the replacement of the MCG's ageing Southern Stand, reducing the AFL's commercial desire to stage finals at VFL Park.

The changes began to be seen in 1991: West Coast had won the minor premiership and the replacement work on the Southern Stand had temporarily halved the MCG's capacity, so all of the finals were played at VFL Park except for West Coast's home qualifying final at Perth's Subiaco Oval, which was the first final played outside Victoria. The use of VFL Park for finals declined thereafter, and the venue's last finals match was staged in 1997, which saw St Kilda defeat Brisbane Lions in front of a crowd of 50,035.

Under the new finals contract beginning in 1992, non-Victorian clubs could host their home finals in their own states, subject to the stipulation that at least one final be played at the MCG each week during the finals. This became increasingly controversial in the early 2000s, a period of time when non-Victorian clubs dominated the competition, after several non-Victorian clubs were forced to host their home finals in Victoria. This led to a renegotiation of the contract in 2005, which introduced the current requirement for ten finals matches (plus all grand finals) to be staged at the MCG every rolling five-year period. The AFL was forced to make some concessions to secure this renegotiation on finals matches, which included giving up the exclusivity it held over MCG access on weekends in winter, allowing the MCG new rights to schedule other major sporting events.

Prior to the renegotiation of the contract, non-Victorian clubs were required to play their home finals at the MCG on five occasions: 1993 (preliminary final, Adelaide vs Essendon), 1996 (first semi-final, West Coast vs Essendon), 1999 (first semi-final, West Coast vs Carlton), 2002 (second semi-final, Adelaide vs Melbourne) and 2004 (Second preliminary final, Brisbane vs Geelong).

== Scheduling ==
=== Pre-finals bye ===
Until 2015, it was standard for the finals to begin in the week after the home-and-away season finished. Since the 2016 AFL finals series, it has been standard to schedule a one-week break between the final round of the AFL season and the first week of finals, introduced to encourage teams participating in the finals to field their strongest side possible ahead of their first final, and to dissuade clubs assured of finals places from resting players en masse in the final home-and-away round – something which had been done in recent prior years by Fremantle (rested 11 players in 2013 and 12 players in 2015) and North Melbourne (rested 9 players in 2015). The pre-finals bye has many critics, who take the view that qualifying final winners are put at a disadvantage by losing match fitness and readiness as a result of two byes in three weeks; this view is supported by the percentage of qualifying final winners who then won their preliminary finals dropping from 94% from 2007 to 2015 to only 55% from 2016 to 2024.

With the expansion from the final eight system to the final ten system in 2026, the first week of the finals – known as the wildcard round and featuring only the clubs ranked 7th through 10th – will be staged during what was previously the pre-finals bye. The top six clubs will continue to have a bye during this week.

=== Drawn games ===
Until 1991, if a finals match was drawn, it would be replayed in full on the following weekend; consequently, all subsequent finals would also be delayed by one week.

Due to various logistical issues that arose following the drawn 1990 qualifying final, replays in finals matches (with the exception of the grand final) were abolished in 1991 in favour of the provision to play extra time to determine a result. In 2016, the provision to replay a drawn grand final was also replaced with extra time.

Since 2020, extra time consists of two periods of play, each lasting three minutes plus time on (these periods were five minutes plus time on between 1991 and 2015), with a change of ends between periods. These periods are played in full, and the team leading at the end of the second period of extra time wins the match; if the scores are still level when the second period of extra time has expired, additional pairs of periods will be played until a winner is determined.

From 2016 to 2019, if the scores were level at the end of the second period of extra time, there would have been a third untimed golden point period of extra time, where the siren would not sound until the next team scored; this was never required.

As of 2024, extra time has been played in a final on three occasions:

- 1994 second qualifying final: North Melbourne v Hawthorn (won by North Melbourne)
- 2007 second semi-final: West Coast v Collingwood (won by Collingwood)
- 2017 first elimination final: Port Adelaide v West Coast (won by West Coast)

Three grand finals were replayed:

- 1948 VFL Grand Final: Melbourne v Essendon (replay won by Melbourne)
- 1977 VFL Grand Final: Collingwood v North Melbourne (replay won by North Melbourne)
- 2010 AFL Grand Final: Collingwood v St Kilda (replay won by Collingwood)

== See also ==
- NRL finals system
