= Playoffs =

League championship competition after the regular season

The playoffs (in United States and Canada), postseason, climax (in Japan and Korea), or finals series (in Australia, New Zealand and the United Kingdom) is a stage of a sports league played after the regular season of a competition by the top competitors to determine the league champion or a similar accolade. Depending on the league, the playoffs may be either a single game, a series of games, or a tournament, and may use a single-elimination system or one of several other different playoff formats. Playoff, in regard to international fixtures, is to qualify or progress to the next round of a competition or tournament.

In team sports in the U.S. and Canada, the vast distances and consequent burdens on cross-country travel have led to regional divisions of teams. Generally, during the regular season, teams play more games in their division than outside it, but the league's best teams might not play against each other in the regular season. Therefore, in the postseason a playoff series is organized. Any group-winning team is eligible to participate, and as playoffs became more popular they were expanded to include second- or even lower-placed teams – the term "wild card" refers to these teams.

In association football, playoffs are often used in the qualification for international tournaments such as the FIFA World Cup. They offer a second chance to the teams failing to qualify directly, and may be regional or intercontinental. In England and Scotland, playoffs are used to decide promotion for lower-finishing teams, rather than to decide a champion in the way they are used in North America. In the EFL Championship (the second tier of English football), teams finishing 3rd to 6th after the regular season compete to decide the third promotion spot to the Premier League.

The term "post-season" is also used in individual sports such as the sport of athletics or swimming to describe the period of championship meetings (such as regional championships, NCAA conference championships, national championships, or world championships) or their qualifiers after the regular season has concluded.

== American football ==
=== National Football League ===
Evidence of playoffs in professional football dates to at least 1919, when the "New York Pro Championship" was held in Western New York (it is possible one was held in 1917, but that is not known for sure). The Buffalo and Rochester metropolitan areas each played a final, the winners of which would advance to the "New York Pro Championship" on Thanksgiving weekend. The top New York teams were eventually absorbed into the National Football League upon its founding in 1920, but the league (mostly driven by an Ohio League that did not have true finals, though they frequently scheduled "de facto" championship matchups) did not adopt the New York league's playoff format, opting for a championship based on regular-season record for its first twelve seasons; as a result, four of the first six "championships" were disputed. Technically, a vote of league owners was all that was required to win a title, but the owners had a gentlemen's agreement to pledge votes based on a score (wins divided by the sum of wins and losses, with a few tiebreakers). When two teams tied at the top of the standings in 1932, an impromptu playoff game was scheduled to settle the tie.

The NFL divided its teams into divisions in 1933 and began holding a single playoff final between division winners. In 1950 the NFL absorbed three teams from the rival All-America Football Conference, and the former "divisions" were now called "conferences", echoing the college use of that term. In 1967, the NFL expanded and created four divisions under the two conferences, which led to the institution of a larger playoff tournament. After the 1970 AFL–NFL merger brought the American Football League into the NFL, the NFL began to use three divisions and a single wild-card team in each conference for its playoffs, in order to produce eight contenders out of six divisions; this was later expanded in 1978 and 1990 so that more wild-card teams could participate.

In 2002 the NFL added its 32nd team, the Houston Texans, and significantly reshuffled its divisional alignment. The league went from 6 division winners and 6 wild-card spots to 8 division winners and only 4 wild-card qualifiers; by 2020, the number of wild-card qualifiers returned to six. The winners of each division automatically earn a playoff spot and a home game in their first rounds, the three top non-division winners from each conference also make the playoffs as wild-card teams. The division winner with the best record in the regular season gets a first-round bye, and each of the other division winners plays one of the three wild-card teams. In the divisional round, the lowest-seeded winner of a wild-card game then plays the lone bye team; the two wild-card winners also advance to play each other. The winners of these two games go to the conference championships, and the winners of those conference finals then face each other in the Super Bowl.

=== College football ===
==== Division I NCAA Football FBS ====
The College Football Playoff National Championship is a post-season college football bowl game, used to determine a national champion of the NCAA Division I Football Bowl Subdivision (FBS), which began play in the 2014 college football season. The game serves as the final of the College Football Playoff, a bracket tournament between the top four teams in the country as determined by a selection committee, which was established as a successor to the Bowl Championship Series and its similar BCS National Championship Game. Unlike the BCS championship, the participating teams in the College Football Playoff National Championship are determined by two semi-final bowls—hosted by two of the consortium's six member bowls yearly—and the top two teams as determined by the selection committee do not automatically advance to the game in lieu of other bowls.

The game is played at a neutral site, determined through bids by prospective host cities (similarly to the Super Bowl and NCAA final four). When announcing it was soliciting bids for the 2016 and 2017 title games, playoff organizers said that the bids must propose host stadiums with a capacity of at least 65,000 spectators, and cities cannot host both a semi-final game and the title game in the same year.

The winner of the game is awarded a new championship trophy instead of the "Crystal Football", which has been given by the American Football Coaches Association (AFCA) since 1986; officials wanted a new trophy that was unconnected with the previous BCS championship system. The new College Football Playoff National Championship Trophy is sponsored by Dr Pepper, which paid an estimated $35 million for the sponsorship rights through 2020. The 26.5-inch high, 35-pound trophy was unveiled on July 14, 2014.

==== Division I NCAA Football FCS ====
The NCAA Division I Football Championship is an American college football tournament played each year to determine the champion of the NCAA Division I Football Championship Subdivision (FCS). Prior to 2006, the game was known as the NCAA Division I-AA Football Championship. The FCS is the highest division in college football to hold a playoff tournament sanctioned by the NCAA to determine its champion. The twelve-team playoff system used by the Bowl Subdivision is not sanctioned by the NCAA.

==== Division II NCAA Football ====
The NCAA Division II Football Championship is an American college football tournament played annually to determine a champion at the NCAA Division II level. It was first held in 1973. Prior to 1973, four regional bowl games were played in order to provide postseason action for what was then called the "NCAA College Division" and a poll determined the final champion.

The National Championship final was held at Sacramento, California from 1973 to 1975. It was in Wichita Falls, Texas in 1976 and 1977. The game was played in Longview, Texas in 1978. For 1979 and 1980, Albuquerque, New Mexico hosted the game. McAllen, Texas hosted the finals from 1981 to 1985. From 1986 to 2013, the Division II final was played at Braly Municipal Stadium near the campus of the University of North Alabama in Florence, Alabama. Between 2014 and 2017, it was played at Children's Mercy Park in Kansas City, Kansas. Since 1994, the games have been broadcast on ESPN.

==== Division III NCAA Football ====
The NCAA Division III Football Championship began in 1973. Before 1973, most of the schools now in Division III competed either in the NCAA College Division or the National Association of Intercollegiate Athletics (NAIA). NCAA Divisions II and III were created by splitting the College Division in two, with schools that wished to continue awarding athletic scholarships placed in Division II and those that did not want to award them placed in Division III.

The Division III playoffs begin with 32 teams selected to participate in them. The Division III final, known as the Stagg Bowl, has been played annually in Salem, Virginia at Salem Football Stadium since 1993. It was previously played in Phenix City, Alabama at Garrett-Harrison Stadium (1973–1982, 1985–1989), at the College Football Hall of Fame, when the Hall was located in Kings Island, Ohio at Galbreath Field (1983–1984), and Bradenton, Florida at Hawkins Stadium (1990–1992).

== Association football ==
As a rule, international association football has only had championship playoffs when a league is divided into several equal divisions, conferences or groups (Major League Soccer) or when the season is split into two periods (as in many leagues in Latin America). In leagues with a single table done only once a year, as in most of Europe, playoff systems are not used to determine champions, although in some countries such systems are used to determine teams to be promoted to higher leagues (e.g., England) or qualifiers for European club competitions (such as Greece and the Netherlands), usually between teams that didn't perform well enough to earn an automatic spot.

A test match is a match played at the end of a season between a team that has done badly in a higher league and one that has done well in a lower league of the same football league system. The format of a test match series varies; for instance it can be a head-to-head between one of the worse finishers of the higher league and one of the better finishers of the lower league, or it can be a mini league where all participants play each other or teams only play those from the other league. The winner of the test match series play in the higher league the following season, and the loser in the lower league.

=== International playoffs ===
In international football, playoffs were a feature of the 1954 and 1958 FIFA World Cup final tournaments. They are still a feature of the qualification tournaments for the FIFA World Cup and the UEFA European Football Championship.

In the qualification playoffs for the 2006 World Cup, for example:

- In Europe, after the first-place finishers in each of eight groups received automatic finals places, along with the two second-place teams that had earned the most points against teams in the top six of their individual groups, the remaining six second-placed teams entered playoffs to select three teams for the finals.
- The winners of the Oceania qualifying tournament, Australia played the fifth-placed team from the South American qualifying tournament, Uruguay.
- The fifth-placed team of the Asia qualifying tournament, Bahrain played the fourth-placed team in the CONCACAF qualifying tournament, Trinidad and Tobago.

Later World Cup qualifying inter-confederation play-offs were held for 2010, 2014, 2018 and 2022.

CONCACAF Nations League and UEFA Nations League hold their respective finals to determine the overall winner at the end of the league, CONCACAF Nations League Finals and UEFA Nations League Finals.

=== Argentina ===
In Argentine football, playoffs in the style of the English leagues occur in the Primera B Metropolitana, part of the third tier, and leagues below it (Primera C Metropolitana and Primera D Metropolitana). All Primera Metropolitana tourneys cover the area in and around Buenos Aires, the capital city. The Torneo Reducidos (reduced tournaments), however, involve 8 teams below the top two, as opposed to 4.

Before the top-flight Argentine Primera División abandoned its traditional Apertura and Clausura format in 2015 in favor of an expanded single season, there was no playoff between the Apertura and Clausura winners. As a result, the league crowned two champions each year. After each Clausura, the two teams with the lowest points-per-game total for the previous six tournaments (three years, counting only Primera División games) were relegated to Primera B Nacional to be replaced by that league's champion and runner-up teams; the two teams immediately above contested promotion/relegation series with the third and fourth places in Primera B Nacional, counted by its aggregate table. In Primera B Nacional, the same procedure continues in use for relegation to either Primera B Metropolitana or Torneo Argentino A for non-Buenos Aires clubs. From 2015 onward, relegation from the Primera División will be based solely on league position at the end of the season (which, effective in 2016–17, changed from a February–December format to an August–June format).

=== Australia ===
The Australian A-League, which also features two teams in New Zealand, has determined its champions via a playoff system, officially known as the "Finals Series" (reflecting standard Australian English usage), since its inception in the 2005–06 season.

From the league's inception through the 2008–09 season, the top four teams advanced to the finals series, employed using a modified Page playoff system. The top two teams at the end of league play were matched in one semifinal, with the winner advancing directly to the grand final and the loser going into the Preliminary Final. The next two teams played a semifinal for a place in the Preliminary Final, whose winner took the other place in the grand final. Both semifinals were two-legged, while the Preliminary Final and Grand Final were one-off matches.

When the league expanded to 10 teams beginning in 2009–10, the finals expanded to six teams. The format of the six-team playoff established at that time was:

- The "semifinals" were held over a two-week period. The pairings for Week 1 of the semifinals were 1 vs 2, 3 vs 6, and 4 vs 5.
- In Week 1, the top two teams played the first leg of a two-legged match, and the remaining teams played one-off knockout matches.
- In Week 2, the top two teams played the second leg of their semifinal, and the two other surviving teams played a one-off match. The winner of the two-legged match advanced directly to the grand final, while the loser of that match joined the winner of the last semifinal in the Preliminary Final.
- The Preliminary Final and Grand Final remained unchanged.

Starting with the 2012–13 season, the finals format has been changed to a pure knockout tournament consisting entirely of one-off matches:

- In Week 1, two Elimination Finals will be held, with the pairings being 3 vs 6 and 4 vs 5.
- In Week 2, the winners of the Elimination Finals advance to Semi-Finals. The top team on the regular-season table, called the "premiers" by the A-League, plays the lowest-seeded survivor of the Elimination Finals, and the second-place team plays the other Elimination Final survivor.
- The Grand Final, pitting the two Semi-Final winners, takes place in Week 3.

The concept of a finals series/playoff is standard in Australian sport.

=== Belgium ===
The Belgian First Division A (previously known as the "First Division" and "Pro League") has a fairly complex playoff system, currently consisting of two levels and at one time three.

Since the 2009–10 season, playoffs have been held to determine the champion and tickets for the Champions League and Europa League. The six highest ranked teams play home-and-away matches against each other; a total of 10 matches each. The 6 participating teams start with the points accumulated during the regular competition divided by two. The first 3 teams after the play-offs get a European ticket. The fourth ranked team (or fifth, when the cup holder is already qualified for European football) plays a knock-out match against the winner of play-off 2. From 2009 to 2010 through 2015–16, teams ranked 7–14 played in two groups; from 2016 to 2017 forward, this playoff will continue to be contested in two groups, but with a total of 12 teams (details below). All points gained from the regular competition are lost. The two group winners play a final match to determine the winner of play-off 2. The winning team plays a final match against the fourth-ranked team (or fifth) for the last European ticket.

The play-off system has been criticized because more points per match can be earned in the play-off stage than in the regular competition. This way the team who wins the most matches isn't automatically the national champion. The biggest upside in favor of the play-off system is the higher number of matches (40 instead of 34 compared to the previous season) and more top matches. The extra matches also generate higher revenues for the teams.

Nonetheless, the higher number of matches takes an extra toll on teams and players. Besides play-offs, the Royal Belgian Football Association (KBVB) also introduced Christmas football in order to complete the extra matches in time. This posed some problems because a few matches had to be cancelled due to snowy pitches. The delays will probably cause the tight schedule to fail and postpone the end of the season.

Some structural changes were instituted in 2015–16:

- The team that finished atop the regular-season table is now assured of a Europa League place if they fail to finish in a Champions League qualifying spot (currently top two places).
- The first tiebreaker between Championship Round teams is now regular-season position.
- Accumulated yellow cards from the regular season are erased, although suspensions will continue to carry over. During the playoffs, three accumulated yellow cards will result in a suspension, as opposed to five during the regular season.

From 1974 through 2015, the 15th team out of 16 in the final standings was involved in a playoff pool with three teams from the Belgian Second Division after each season, to determine which of these teams played in the First Division/Pro League the oncoming season. The lowest ranked team of the First Division/Pro League was relegated and replaced by the Second Division champion.

Originally, these playoffs were introduced in 1974 and were part of the Second Division, to determine which team was promoted to the highest level together with the division champions. From the 2005–06 season on, only one team was relegated directly from the First Division, with the 17th team taking part in the playoff. As a result, this playoff was still called the Belgian Second Division final round, although one team from the Pro League took part each year.

Starting in 2015–16, this playoff was scrapped and replaced with direct relegation for the bottom Pro League/First Division A team only.

Further changes will be introduced to the Europa League playoffs from 2016 to 2017 forward. The playoff will involve a total of 12 teams—nine from First Division A, and three from First Division B (the renamed Second Division). The First Division A qualifiers will be those finishing between 7th and 15th on the regular-season table. The First Division B qualifiers will be the top three teams from that league's regular-season table, excluding the division champion, which instead earns promotion to First Division A. As in the previous format, the teams will be divided into two groups, each playing home-and-away within the group, and the two group winners will play a one-off final, with the winner of that match advancing to a one-off match against the fourth- or fifth-place team from the championship playoff (depending on available European slots) for the final Europa League place.

=== Brazil ===
In Brazil, the Copa do Brasil, the second most prestigious country-wide competition, is contested in pure "knockout" format since its inception in 1989. While the top two tiers in the Brazilian League – Série A and Série B – are contested in double round robin format, the lower tiers Série C and Série D include knockout rounds in their final stages.

=== Bulgaria ===
Bulgaria instituted an elaborate playoff system in its top flight, the First League, in the 2016–17 season.

After the league's 14 teams play a full home-and-away season, the league splits into two playoffs—a 6-team "championship playoff" and an 8-team "qualifying playoff", with the latter split into two 4-team groups. Each playoff begins with teams carrying over all goals and statistics from the home-and-away season.

Each team in the championship playoff plays the others home and away one additional time. At the end of this stage:

- The top team is declared league champion, and earns the country's sole place in the UEFA Champions League.
- The second-place team earns a place in the UEFA Europa League.
- The highest-placed team that has not already qualified for European competition advances to an eventual one-off match for the country's final Europa League place. This will often be the third-place team, but if the winner of the Bulgarian Cup (which earns an automatic Europa League place) is in the top three of the playoff, the fourth-place team will take its place.

Each group within the qualifying playoff also plays home and away within its group; after this stage, teams enter another level of playoffs depending on their positions in the group.

The top two teams in each group enter a knockout playoff consisting entirely of two-legged matches (unless one of these teams is the winner of that season's Bulgarian Cup, in which case it will not enter the playoff and the team that it would have played receives a bye into the playoff final). The winner of this playoff then contests a one-off match against the third-place (or fourth-place) team from the championship playoff, with the winner claiming the final Europa League place.

The bottom two teams from each group begin a series of relegation playoffs. The series starts with a knockout playoff that also consists entirely of two-legged matches. The winner of the playoff remains in the First League for the following season. The losing teams then enter the following series of two-legged promotion/relegation matches:

1. The losers of the knockout semifinals play, with the loser relegated to the Second League.
2. The loser of the knockout final plays the third-place team from the Second League, with the winner playing in the next season's First League.
3. Finally, the winner of Match 1 above plays the second-place team from the Second League, with the winner also playing in the next season's First League.

=== Dominican Republic ===
With the creation of the Liga Dominicana de Fútbol in 2014 to replace the Primera División de Republica Dominicana, it introduced a playoff system to determine the champion of the season. This is more a deference to baseball, which employs the system, being traditionally the most popular sport in the nation.

=== England and Wales ===
When the Football League was first expanded to two divisions in 1892, test matches were employed to decide relegation and promotion between them, but the practice was scrapped in favour of automatic relegation and promotion in 1898.

The use of play-offs to decide promotion issues returned to the League in 1986 with the desire to reduce the number of mid-table clubs with nothing to play for at the end of the season. The Football Conference, now known as the National League, introduced play-offs in 2002 after the Football League agreed to a two-club exchange with the Conference.

The top two teams in the EFL Championship and in EFL League One are automatically promoted to the division above and thus do not compete in the play-offs. The top three teams in EFL League Two and the champion of the National League (formerly known as Conference Premier) are also automatically promoted. In EFL playoffs, the four clubs finishing below the automatic promotion places compete in two-legged semi-finals with the higher-placed club enjoying home advantage in the second leg. In the National League however, the six clubs finishing below the champions compete in playoffs - the lower four competing in an elimination match to decide who plays in the semifinals (the top two receive a bye into the semifinals). The away goals rule does not apply for the semi-finals. The Football League play-off finals were originally played in two legs, at both teams' home grounds, but were later changed to one-off affairs, which are played at Wembley Stadium in London.

Teams are also promoted using a play-off tournament from levels six to eight of the football pyramid. At level six, the play-off semi-finals are two leg ties with the final being a single match played at the home ground of the highest placed of the two teams. At levels seven and eight, all of the ties are single matches played at the home ground of the team with the highest league position.

In 2003, Gillingham proposed replacing the current play-off system with one involving six clubs from each division and replacing the two-legged ties with one-off matches. If adopted, the two higher-placed clubs in the play-offs would have enjoyed first-round byes and home advantage in the semi-finals. It was a controversial proposal — some people did not believe a club finishing only in eighth position in the League could (or should) compete in the Premiership while others found the system too American for their liking. Although League chairmen initially voted in favour of the proposal, it was blocked by The FA and soon abandoned.

The championship of every division in English football is determined solely by the standings in the league. However, a championship play-off would be held if the top two teams were tied for points, goal difference, goals scored in both their overall league record, and identical head-to-head record (including head-to-head away goals scored); to date, this has never happened. A play-off would also be scheduled if two teams are tied as above for a position affecting promotion, relegation, or European qualification.

=== Greece ===
Starting in the 2007–08 season, Super League Greece instituted a playoff system to determine all of its places in European competition for the following season, except for those of the league champion and the cup winner. Currently, the league is entitled to two Champions League places and three in the Europa League, with one of the Europa League places reserved for the cup winner. The playoff currently takes the form of a home-and-away mini-league involving the second- through fifth-place teams, under the following conditions:

- The fifth-place team starts the playoffs at 0 points.
- The remaining teams start with a number of "bonus points" determined as follows:
  - The number of points earned by the fifth-place team during the main league season is subtracted from the totals of each other club involved in the playoffs.
  - The resulting number is then divided by 5 and rounded to the nearest whole number.
- At the end of the playoffs, the winner receives the country's second Champions League place. The next two teams enter the Europa League at different points depending on their playoff finishes; the last-placed team is entirely out of European competition. However, if the cup winner finished in a playoff spot (as happened in 2010–11), or the league champion also won the cup, and the losing cup finalist finished in a playoff spot (as happened in 2012–13), the bottom three teams in the playoff all receive Europa League berths.

=== Italy ===
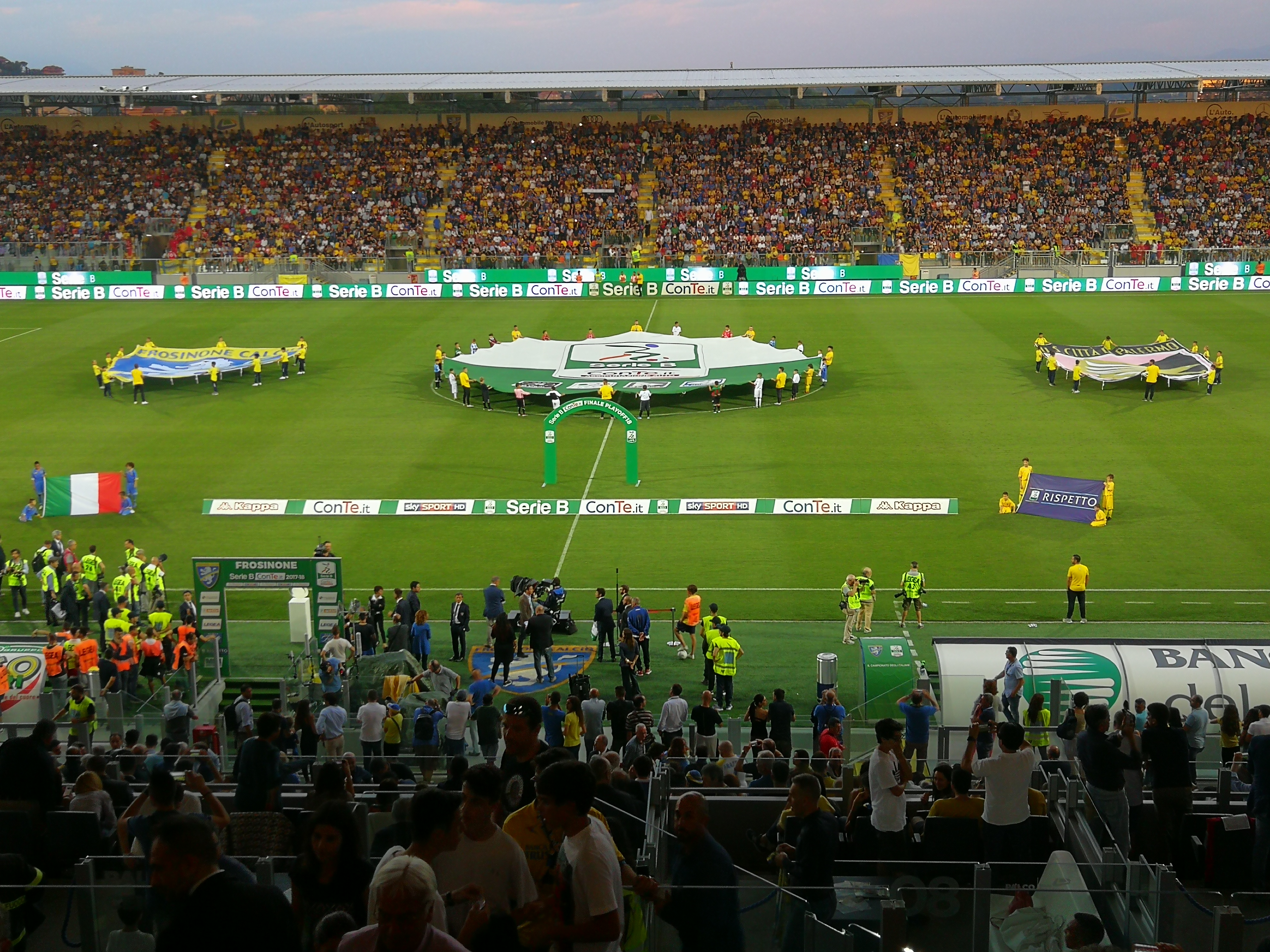
2018 Serie B playoff final, 2nd leg. Frosinone, Italy, 16 June 2018.

In 2004–05, Italy's professional league introduced a promotion playoff to its second tier of football, Serie B. It operates almost identically to the system currently used in England. The top two clubs in Serie B earn automatic promotion to Serie A with the next four clubs entering a playoff to determine who wins the third promotion place, as long as fewer than 10 points separate the third and fourth-placed teams (which often occurs).

Like the English playoffs, the Italian playoffs employ two-legged semi-finals, with the higher finisher in the league table earning home advantage in the second leg. If the teams are level on aggregate after full-time of the second leg, away goals are not used, but extra time is used. Unlike England, the Italian playoff final is two-legged, again with the higher finisher earning home advantage in the second leg. In both rounds, if the tie is level on aggregate after extra time in the second leg, the team that finished higher in the league standings wins.

In 2003–04, Italy's football league used a two-legged test match to determine one spot in the top level of its system, Serie A. Some leagues in continental Europe combine automatic promotion/relegation with test matches. For example, in the Netherlands, only one club is automatically relegated from its top level, the Eredivisie, each season, with the winner of the second-flight being promoted. The next two lower-placed teams enter a promotion/relegation mini-league with high-placed teams from the Dutch First Division

=== Japan ===
J.League in Japan used a test match series between the third-from-bottom team in J1 and third-place team in J2 (see J. League promotion/relegation Series) from 2004 to 2008. The promotion/relegation Series concept dates as far back as 1965 and the first season of the Japan Soccer League.

The J.League Championship was held in J.League Division 1 from the inaugural season in 1993 to the 2004 season, and in the J1 League for the 2015 and 2016 seasons, as a post-season tournament to determine the annual champion.

Promotion/relegation Series occurred with the 2012–2016 seasons of J. League Division 2/J2 League, conditional on the top two J3 League (JFL teams from 2012 to 2013) fulfilling J. League club criteria. In turn, J2 implemented a promotion playoff to J1 on the style of England for the 3rd to 6th clubs. The new J3 League did the same beginning in 2024.

The Japan Football League, the current Japanese 4th division, uses the promotion/relegation Series only when the number of clubs in the league needs to be filled with clubs from the Japanese Regional Leagues. In 2024 a promotion/relegation series was also added for the second places against the bottom J3 clubs, provided that they qualify for promotion criteria.

=== Mexico ===
Mexico's top flight league, Liga MX, is contested annually by 18 teams. In each of two annual tournaments, every team plays every other team in the league once (17 games), after which the top eight teams advance to the Liguilla.

In the Liguilla, all rounds are home-and-away. Teams are drawn so the best team plays the worst, the second-best plays the second-worst, and so on. After one round, the teams are redrawn so the best remaining team again plays the worst remaining one and the second-best faces the second-worst in the semi-finals. The two winners of this round play each other for the championship.

There is no playoff between the Apertura and Clausura winner. As a result, the league crowns two champions each year. After each Clausura, the team with the lowest points-per-game total for the previous six tournaments (three years, counting only Liga MX games) is relegated to Ascenso MX to be replaced by that league's champion (if eligible).

=== Netherlands ===
In the Netherlands, a playoff was introduced in the 2005–06 season. It is used to determine which teams from the Eredivisie qualify for European football. The playoff system has been criticized by clubs, players and fans as the number of matches will increase. Under the original playoff format, it was possible, though thoroughly unlikely, that the runner-up would not qualify for Europe; the following year, the format was changed so that the second-place team was assured of no worse than a UEFA Cup berth. Starting in 2008–09, the format was changed yet again. The champion goes directly to the Champions League; the runner-up enters the second qualification round of the CL; the number three enters the fourth (and last) qualification round of the UEFA Europa League (EL; the new name of the UEFA Cup from 2009 to 2010 onward) and the number four goes to the third qualification round of the EL. The only play-off will be for the clubs placed 5th through 8th. The winner of that play-off receives a ticket for the second qualification round of the EL.

Playoffs are also part of the promotion and relegation structure between the Eredivisie and the Eerste Divisie, the two highest football leagues in the Netherlands.

=== Philippines ===
The Philippines Football League (PFL) adopted a playoffs for its inaugural 2017 season. The top four clubs of the regular season qualified for the playoffs which was dubbed as the "Finals Series". The Finals Series was dropped after the establishment of the Copa Paulino Alcantara which became the PFL's cup tournament.

=== Scotland ===
The Scottish Football League (SFL) experimented briefly with test matches in 1995–96 and 1996–97, contested between the second-bottom team of the Premier Division and the second-placed team of the First Division.

After the Scottish Premier League (SPL) and SFL merged in 2013 to form the Scottish Professional Football League (SPFL), reuniting the top four divisions of Scotland since the breakaway of the SPL in 1998–99, a modified test match format was introduced between the Scottish Premiership and Scottish Championship. The bottom team from the first-tier Premiership is automatically relegated and is replaced by the winners of the second-tier Championship, provided that club meets Premiership entry criteria. The second-, third- and fourth-placed teams from the Championship qualify for a play-off consisting of two-legged ties, with the second-placed team receiving a bye to play the winner of the teams that finished third and fourth. The winner of this play-off then faces the second-bottom Premiership team, also over two legs, with the winner of that tie taking up the final Premiership place (again, assuming that the Championship club meets Premiership criteria).

The three lower divisions of the SPFL — the Championship, League One and League Two — continue with the promotion/relegation play-off system their predecessor SFL leagues used (the First Division, Second Division and Third Division, respectively). In the Championship/League One and League One/League Two, while the champions are automatically promoted and the bottom team relegated, there are play-offs of the second-bottom teams against the second-, third- and fourth-placed teams from the division below. Home and away ties decide semi-finals and a final, and the overall winner plays in the higher division the following season, with the loser playing in the lower division.

Beginning with the 2014–15 season, promotion and relegation between the SPFL and the Scottish regional leagues were introduced. Following the end of the league season, the winners of the fifth-level Highland and Lowland Leagues compete in a two-legged playoff. The winner then enters a two-legged playoff against the bottom team from Scottish League Two, with the winner of that tie either remaining in or promoted to League Two.

Long before the SPL era, two situations arose in which the top two teams in the table had to share the title as neither goal average nor goal difference had been instituted to break ties. The first was the inaugural season, in which Dumbarton and Rangers both earned 29 points and had to play off for the title. The match ended in a 0–0 draw and both teams shared the title. The second happened 19 years later, in the Second Division, when Leith Athletic and Raith Rovers both earned 33 points. This time, the clubs chose not to play off. In 1915 goal average was finally instituted.

=== Spain ===
Since the 2010–11 season, the Segunda División established promotion playoffs between the 3rd to 6th-placed teams, similar to the rules in the English and Italian systems. However, due to reserve teams being allowed to compete in the same football league system, subsequent places may be allowed to play off depending on reserve teams finishing within the 3rd to 6th places.

At a lower level, playoffs in Segunda División B take place to decide the divisional title between the 4 group winners, and to decide which other teams would be promoted, as follows:

- The first set of matches are an elimination tournament between the 4 group winners. The winners of each match are promoted and then play a final for the tier title.
- After the tier final takes place, the teams who finished 2nd in each of the 4 groups play the teams who finished 4th, whereas the teams who finished third play each other. The 6 winners, along with the 2 Group winners who lost their games in the earlier semifinals, play in each other in a knockout format until there is 2 teams remaining who are promoted.
- If within the qualifying places exist reserve teams whose senior teams are already in Segunda División, subsequent places are allowed to play off. If the senior teams are relegated from Segunda División during the season, the reserve team is automatically disqualified from competing and relegated to Tercera División.

Previously a playoff system had been used in which the teams finishing 3rd and 4th from last in La Liga had played off against the teams finishing 3rd and 4th in the Segunda División. This system had been introduced in the 1980s but ended in 1998–99.

In the women's game, since the 2022–23 season, the Primera Federación Femenina has playoffs between the 2nd to 5th-placed teams, as only the champions are automatically promoted to Liga F. As in the men's game, subsequent places are promoted or allowed to play off if reserve teams finish within the top five.

=== United States and Canada ===
In Major League Soccer, the top flight in the United States and Canada, the MLS Cup Playoffs are contested after the end of the regular season by the top teams in each conference. The winner of the MLS Cup, the final match in the playoffs, is considered the league's champion for that season. The number of teams that qualify has varied: from the 2012 season to the 2014 season, the top five teams in each of its two conferences played in the playoffs; this was increased to six teams from 2015 to 2018 and later seven teams in the 2019 season, which also switched all rounds to single-elimination matches. Under this system, the conferences have separate playoff brackets.

Since the 2023 edition, the MLS Cup Playoffs have had nine teams from each conference playing in separate brackets until the MLS Cup final. The preliminary round has the eighth seed hosting the ninth seed while the top seven seeds get a prelim-round bye. Whoever wins plays the top seed in Round One. In Round One, the top-seed hosts the eighth-ninth winner, the runner-up hosts the seventh seed, the third hosts the sixth, and the fourth hosts the fifth, in best-of-three games. The remaining rounds (the conference semifinals, conference final, and MLS Cup final) are single-elimination matches hosted by the team with the better regular season record. 62 percent of teams make the playoff under this new format.

Since 2012, the MLS Cup has been hosted by the conference champion that has the most table points during the regular season.

In the case of ties after regulation in any round, 30 minutes of extra time (divided into two 15-minute periods) would be played followed by a penalty-kick shootout, if necessary, to determine the winners.

The defunct Women's Professional Soccer (WPS), which operated only in the U.S., conducted a four-team stepladder tournament consisting of one-off knockout matches. The third seed hosted the fourth seed in the first round. The winner of that game advanced to the "Super Semifinal", hosted by the second seed. The Super Semifinal winner traveled to the top seed for the final. The WPS's replacement, the National Women's Soccer League (which launched in 2013), uses a single elimination tournament. The current NWSL playoff structure has a more standard eight-team knockout playoff where the top-seed hosts the eighth, the runner-up hosts the seventh, the third-ranked team plays the sixth-ranked, and the fourth plays the fifth. The lowest-seeded winner from the quarterfinals plays the highest-seeded and the next-lowest the next-highest team in the semifinals. The winners of two one-off semifinals advance to the one-off final. From 2021 to 2023, the NWSL had a 6-team tournament; and from 2013 to 2019, it had a 4-team single elimination tournament.

== Australian rules football ==
Playoffs are used throughout Australia in Australian rules football to determine the premiership. The term finals is most commonly used to describe them.

In each league, between four and eight teams (depending on league size) qualify for the finals based on the league ladder at the end of the season. Australian rules football leagues employ finals systems which act as a combination between a single elimination tournament for lower-ranked teams and a double elimination tournament for higher-ranked teams in order to provide teams with an easier pathway to the grand final as reward for strong performances throughout the season. Finals are decided by single matches, rather than series.

The Australian Football League, which is the top level of the sport, currently has eight teams qualify for the finals under a system designed by the league in 2000. Between 1931 and 1999, variants of the McIntyre system were used to accommodate four, five, six and eight teams, and prior to 1930, six different finals systems were used.

In most other leagues, from state-level leagues such as the South Australian National Football League and West Australian Football League, down to local suburban leagues, it is most common for either four or five teams to qualify for the finals. In these cases the Page–McIntyre final four system or the McIntyre final five system are used universally.

The Australian Football League (which was known until 1990 as the Victorian Football League) was the first league to introduce regular finals when it was established in 1897. The South Australian National Football League introduced finals in 1898, and other leagues soon followed.

Prior to 1897, the premiership was generally awarded to the team with the best overall win–loss record at the end of the season. If two teams finished with equal records, a playoff match for the premiership was required: this occurred in the Challenge Cup in 1871, the SAFA in 1889 and 1894, and in the VFA in 1896.

== Baseball ==
=== Japan ===
Before 1950, the original Japanese Baseball League had been a single-table league of franchises. After it was reorganized into the Nippon Professional Baseball (NPB) system, a series of playoffs ensued between the champions of the Central League and Pacific League.

Before the playoff system was developed in both professional leagues, the Pacific League had applied a playoff system on two occasions. The first was between 1973 and 1982, when a split-season was applied with a 5-game playoff between the winning teams from both halves of season (unless a team won both of the halves so that they did not need to play such a game). The second time was between 2004 and 2006, when the top three teams played a two-staged stepladder knockout (3 games in the first stage and 5 games in the second stage) to decide the League Champion (and the team playing in the Japan Series). After this system was applied, the Seibu Lions (now Saitama Seibu Lions), Chiba Lotte Marines and Hokkaido Nippon Ham Fighters, which claimed the Pacific League Championship under this system, were all able to clinch the following Japan Series in that season. The success of such a playoff system convinced the Central League to consider a similar approach. In 2007, a new playoff system, named the "Climax Series", was introduced to both professional leagues in NPB to decide the teams that would compete for the Japan Series. The Climax Series basically applied the rule of the playoff system in the Pacific League, with one important change: each League championship is awarded to the team finishing the regular season at the top of their respective league, regardless of their fate in the playoffs. This means that the two League Champions are not guaranteed to make the Japan Series. The Chunichi Dragons took advantage of this in the first Climax Series season, finishing second in the regular season but sweeping the Hanshin Tigers and the League Champion Yomiuri Giants in the Central League to win a place in the Japan Series; they subsequently defeated the Hokkaido Nippon Ham Fighters to claim their first Japan Series in 52 years.

In 2008, the format of Climax Series will have a slight change, in which the second stage will be played over a maximum of six games, with the League Champion starting with an automatic one game advantage.

=== South Korea ===
The teams finishing in fourth and fifth place in the regular season face each other in the wildcard game. The winner of the wildcard game faces the team that finished in third place in the first round of the play-offs. The winner of the first round faces the team that finished in second place during the regular season, and the winner of that round faces the team that finished in first place for the championship in the Korean Series. This type of format is known as the stepladder playoff.

=== Taiwan ===
Taiwan's playoff is different to many such competitions, due to the league's split-season format. The winners of the first half-season and the winners of the second half-season are eligible to play in the playoffs, but if the best overall team have not won either half season then they qualify into a wild card series against the weaker half-season winner, with the winner of this advancing into the Taiwan Series to face the other half-season winner. If the first and second half winners are different, but one of them is also the best overall team, then both teams progress directly to the Taiwan Series. Finally, if one team wins both halves of the season then a playoff will take place between the second and third best teams for the right to play them in the Final Series; in this case the team winning both halves of the season will begin the Taiwan Series with an automatic one game advantage.

=== United States and Canada ===
==== Major League Baseball ====
Major League Baseball (MLB) itself does not use the term "playoffs" for championship tournaments. Instead, it uses the term "postseason" as the title of the elimination tournament held after the conclusion of the regular season. From 2012 to 2019 and 2021 season, it consisted of a first round single-elimination Wild Card Game between the two wild-card teams in each league. From 2022, the postseason begins with a two best-of-three Wild Card Series first round, followed by a best-of-five second round series called the Division Series, and two rounds of best-of-seven series for the League Championship Series and World Series. One exception is 2020, when the first-round series, the Wild Card Series, a best-of-three round, was created, along with the other rounds. The first three seeds went to division champions, the next three seeds to division runners-up, and the last two to the next-best records. The pairings for the Wild Card Series are as follows: top seed vs. eighth, second vs. seventh, third vs. sixth, and fourth vs. fifth. The division series has the 1–8 winner play the 4–5 winner, while the 2–7 winner plays the 3–6 winner.

MLB uses a "2–3–2" format for the final two rounds of its postseason tournament. The singular term "playoff" is reserved for the rare situation in which two (or more) teams find themselves tied at the end of the regular season and are forced to have a tiebreaking playoff game (or games) to determine which team will advance to the postseason. Thus, a "playoff" is actually part of the regular season and can be called a "pennant playoff". However, the plural term "playoffs" is conventionally used by fans and media to refer to baseball's postseason tournament, not including the World Series.

MLB is the oldest of the major American professional sports, dating back to the 1870s. As such, it is steeped in tradition. The final series to determine its champion has been called the "World Series" (originally "World's Championship Series" and then "World's Series") as far back as the National League's contests with the American Association during the 1880s.

==== Minor League Baseball ====
Most of the domestic Minor League Baseball (MiLB) leagues which are affiliated with Major League Baseball conduct playoffs after their regular season to determine champions.

Before the 2021 reorganization of MiLB, most leagues at the Triple-A, Double-A, and Class A-Advanced classification levels included four qualifying teams which competed in two best-of-five rounds: semi-finals and finals. Most Class A, Class A Short Season, and Rookie League playoffs consisted of two best-of-three rounds. The champions of the two Triple-A leagues, the International League and Pacific Coast League, met in the Triple-A National Championship Game, a single game to determine an overall champion of the classification.

In the 2021 season, the first after the reorganization, no MiLB league had more than two teams involved in playoffs, with some leagues not holding a postseason at all.

- The Rookie leagues, better known as the Complex Leagues (from those leagues being hosted at major-league spring training facilities), did not hold playoffs; the regular-season winners were crowned champions.
- In all Low-A, High-A, and Double-A leagues (three at each level), the top two teams at the end of the regular season advanced to a best-of-five championship series.
- In both Triple-A leagues, the top team at the end of the 120-game regular season was crowned champion. After the regular season, all 30 teams at this level played a 10-game "Final Stretch".

== Basketball ==
=== National Basketball Association ===
The present organization known as the National Basketball Association, then called the BAA (Basketball Association of America), had its inaugural season in 1946–47. Teams had always have different strength of schedule from each other; currently, a team plays a team outside its conference twice, a team within its conference but outside its division three or four times, and a team from its own division four times.

In the current system, eight clubs from each of the league's two conferences qualify for the playoffs, with separate playoff brackets for each conference. In the 2002–03 season, the first-round series were expanded from best-of-5 to best-of-7; all other series have always been best-of-7. In all series, home games alternate between the two teams in a 2-2-1-1-1 format.

The 2-3-2 finals format was adopted from the 1985 Finals to 2013, copying the format that was then in effect in the National Hockey League. Prior to 1985, almost all finals were played in the 2-2-1-1-1 format (although the 1971 Finals between Milwaukee and Baltimore were on an alternate-home basis, some 1950s finals used the 2-3-2 format, and the 1975 Golden State-Washington and 1978 and 1979 Seattle-Washington Finals were on a 1-2-2-1-1 basis). Also, prior to the 1980s, Eastern and Western playoffs were on an alternate-home basis except for series when distance made the 2-2-1-1-1 format more practical. Since 2014, the NBA Finals restored the original format.

Teams are seeded according to their regular-season record. Through the 2014–15 season, the three division champions and best division runner-up received the top four seeds, with their ranking based on regular-season record. The remaining teams were seeded strictly by regular-season record. However, if the best division runner-up had a better record than other division champs, it could be seeded as high as second. Beginning in 2015–16, the NBA became the first major American league to eliminate automatic playoff berths for division champions; the top eight teams overall in each conference now qualify for the playoffs, regardless of divisional alignment.

Since the 2019–20 season, only the top six teams qualify directly to the playoffs. The remaining two teams in each conference are determined through what is officially considered a separate postseason tournament, consisting of the seventh through tenth-placed teams. Known as a play-in tournament, it consists of three, one-game series:

- Seventh placed team vs. eighth placed team
- Ninth placed team vs. tenth placed team
- Loser of 7–8 game vs. winner of 9–10 game.

The winner of the 7–8 game advances to the playoffs as the 7th seed, while the loser faces the winner of the 9–10 game (the loser of it is eliminated from playoff contention). The winner of this third game advances to the playoffs as the 8th seed, while the loser is also eliminated from playoff contention. From there, the playoffs continue as normal.

=== Elsewhere ===
Top flight basketball leagues elsewhere also employ a playoff system mimicking the NBA's. However, most leagues are not divided into divisions and conferences, and employ a double round robin format akin to league association football, unlike the NBA where teams are divided into divisions and conferences, which leads to different strengths of schedule per team. Teams are seeded on regular season record. The playoff structure can be single-elimination or a best-of series, with the higher seed, if held the playoffs are not held at a predetermined venue, having the home court advantage.

Aside from the playoffs, some leagues also have a knockout tournament akin to the FA Cup running in parallel to the regular season. These are not considered playoffs.

In the EuroLeague, after the regular season plays a best-of-5 playoffs in a 2–2–1 format. However, from the semifinals on, it is a single elimination tournament held at a predetermined venue. Still others also have a relegation playoff.

In NCAA Division I basketball conferences, a playoff or "postseason tournament" is held after the regular season. Most conferences, including all of the "major" basketball conferences (ACC, American, Big East, Big Ten, Big 12, Pac-12, SEC), hold their tournaments at a predetermined venue, with all conference teams participating (unless barred due to NCAA sanctions). A few conferences hold early rounds at campus sites and later rounds at a predetermined site. For example, the Mid-American Conference holds its first-round games at campus sites, but the rest of the tournament in Cleveland. The Big South Conference holds its first round at campus sites, gives hosting rights for its quarterfinals and semifinals to the regular-season champion, and plays its final at the home court of the top remaining seed. The America East Conference, ASUN Conference, and Patriot League hold all tournament games at campus sites. A small number of conferences do not invite all of their teams to the conference tournament, with one example being the Ivy League, in which only four of the eight members advance to the tournament (which is at a predetermined site). In many such tournaments, higher seeds are afforded byes. The winners, and some losers which are selected as "at-large bids", play in the NCAA tournament, which is also single-elimination and held at predetermined venues.

In the WNBA playoffs, the league's best 8 teams, regardless of conference alignment, compete, and are seeded based on their regular-season records. The top two seeds are reserved for the conference leaders plus the next six teams with the next-best records. Since 2025, the league quarterfinals are best-of-three on an odd-even basis, the league semifinals are best-of-5 on a 2-2-1 basis and the championship is best-of-seven, with a 2-2-1-1-1 basis.

== Canadian football ==
In the Canadian Football League, the playoffs begin in November. After the regular season, the top team from each division has a bye week during the Division Semifinal, and an automatic home game berth in the Division Final. The second-place team from each division hosts the third-place team in the Division Semifinal, unless the fourth-place team from the opposite division finishes with a better record. This "crossover rule" does not come into play if the teams have identical records—there are no tiebreakers. While the format means that it is possible for two teams in the same division to play for the Grey Cup, so far only two crossover teams have won the divisional semifinal game. The winners of each Division's Semifinal game then travel to play the first place teams in the Division Finals. Since 2005, the Division Semifinals and Division Finals have been sponsored by Scotiabank and are branded as the "Scotiabank East Championship" and "Scotiabank West Championship". The two division champions then face each other in the Grey Cup game, which is held on the third or fourth Sunday of November.

The Edmonton Elks are notable for qualifying for the CFL playoffs every year from 1972 to 2005, a record in North American pro sports. They are also the first crossover team to ever win the divisional semifinal game.

There were no playoffs in 2020.

== Cricket ==
There are a number of T20 leagues played in cricket for a few weeks each in many countries, which all generally follow some variation of the Page playoff system, and have 8 teams.

=== Big Bash League ===
The KFC Big Bash League (BBL) Finals Series is the playoff stage of the Australian professional men's Twenty20 cricket league. The current format involves four teams battling it out in a four-match structure to determine the season's champion. The key feature of the finals series is the "double-chance" advantage given to the top two teams, which significantly rewards success in the regular season.

=== Indian Premier League ===
The Indian Premier League is the largest T20 league, and uses the Page playoff format: the top two teams in the group stage play a semi-final, and the third and fourth-place teams play an eliminator match, to determine which will remain in contention for the final. The two remaining teams that have not yet qualified for the final among the top four teams then play a second semi-final, and then the final occurs.

=== T20 Blast ===
The Vitality Blast, England and Wales' premier domestic T20 competition, uses a straightforward knockout structure to determine its champion, culminating in a spectacular single-day event known as Finals Day.

The four winning teams from the quarter-finals meet on a single day at a single neutral venue to determine the champion. This is universally known as Finals Day, and it is traditionally held at Edgbaston Stadium in Birmingham.

Finals Day is famous for its festival atmosphere, non-stop cricket action, and the high-pressure nature of three winner-takes-all matches.

=== The Hundred ===
The Hundred is an English 100-ball cricket tournament. The top three teams from the 8-team group stage advance to the playoffs, with the winner of a semi-final between the second and third-placed teams facing the table-toppers in the final.

=== Minor League Cricket ===
Minor League Cricket (MiLC) features 27 American teams split into the Pacific and Atlantic conferences, each of which is split into two regional divisions. The top two teams from each division advance to the Quarterfinals, with the final contested by one team from each conference. The Quarterfinal is unique in that it is a best-of-three series, and that it sees the top team from one division playing the second-placed team from the other division of their conference; this offers teams an incentive to finish as high as possible in the league stage so as to draw an easier matchup in the Quarterfinals.

== Hockey ==
=== National Hockey League ===
The National Hockey League playoff system is an elimination tournament competition for the Stanley Cup, consisting of four rounds of best-of-seven series. The first three rounds determine which team from each conference will advance to the final round, dubbed the Stanley Cup Final. The winner of that series becomes the NHL and Stanley Cup champion.

Since 2014, the Conference Quarterfinals consists of four match-ups in each conference, based on the seedings division-wise (No. 1 vs. No. 4, and No. 2 vs. No. 3). The division winner with the best record in the conference plays the lowest wild-card seed, while the other division winner plays the top wild-card seed (wild-card teams, who are de facto 4th seeds, may cross over to another division within the conference). In the Conference Semifinals, the four remaining teams in the conference face each other. In the third round, the Conference Finals, the two surviving teams play each other, with the conference champions proceeding to the Stanley Cup Final.

For the first two rounds, the higher-seeded team has home-ice advantage (regardless of point record). Thereafter, it goes to the team with the better regular season record. In all rounds, the team with home-ice advantage hosts games one, two, five and seven, while the opponent hosts games three, four and six (games 5–7 are played "if necessary").

For the 2019–20, in which the regular season was prematurely ended by the COVID-19 pandemic only the top four teams in each conference, as determined by points-per-game, qualified directly to the First Round of the Stanley Cup Playoffs. The remaining four First Round teams per conference were determined by best-of-five Stanley Cup Qualifiers.

=== Kontinental Hockey League ===
The Kontinental Hockey League, based in Russia and including teams from several nearby countries, operates a playoff system similar to that of the NHL, also consisting of four rounds of single-elimination best-of-seven series. The first three rounds determine which team from each conference will advance to the final round, dubbed the Gagarin Cup Finals. The winner of that series becomes the KHL and Gagarin Cup champion.

Like the NHL, the Conference Quarterfinals consists of four match-ups in each conference. The winner of each division receives one of the top two seeds in its conference; the others are based on regular-season record. Unlike the NHL, divisional alignment plays no added role in playoff seeding—all teams are seeded solely within their conference. Playoff pairings are based on seeding number within the conference (No. 1 vs. No. 8, No. 2 vs. No. 7, No. 3 vs. No. 6, and No. 4 vs. No. 5). The division winner with the best record in the conference plays the lowest wild-card seed, while the other division winner plays the next-lowest seed (wild-card teams, who are de facto 4th seeds, may cross over to another division within the conference). The playoff pairings are reseeded after the first round (a feature that was once used in the NHL, but now abandoned). Therefore, the Conference Semifinals feature the top remaining seed in the conference playing the lowest remaining seed, and the two other first-round survivors playing one another. In the third round, the Conference Finals, the two surviving teams play each other, with the conference champions proceeding to the Gagarin Cup Finals.

For the first two rounds, the higher-seeded team has home-ice advantage (regardless of point record). Thereafter, it goes to the team with the better regular season record. In all rounds the team with home-ice advantage hosts Games 1, 2, 5 and 7, while the opponent hosts Games 3, 4 and 6 (Games 5–7 are played "if necessary").

=== Elite Ice Hockey League ===
In the United Kingdom, the Elite Ice Hockey League playoffs are an elimination tournament where the draw is based on the finishing position of teams in the league. Of the 10 teams which compete, the top 8 qualify for the playoffs. The first round (the quarter-finals) are played over two legs (home and away) where the team who finished in 1st place in the regular season plays the team which finished 8th, 2nd plays 7th and so on, with the aggregate score deciding which team progresses.

The semi-finals and final are held over the course of a single weekend at the National Ice Centre in Nottingham. Each consists of a single game with the losing team being eliminated, with the two semi-final games being played on the Saturday and the final on the Sunday. There is also a third-place game held earlier on the Sunday between the losing teams from the semi-finals. Unlike in the NHL, the winners of the Elite League playoffs are not considered to be the league champions for that season (that title goes to the team which finishes in first place in the league), rather the playoffs are considered to be a separate competition although being crowned playoff champions is a prestigious accolade nonetheless. The most recent playoff champions are the Nottingham Panthers.

=== Professional Women's Hockey League ===
In the Professional Women's Hockey League, from its establishment in 2024 to 2026, there used to be two best-of-five rounds in the Walter Cup playoffs, the semifinals and the final, each played on a 2-2-1 basis. 2027 will see three, starting with the Conference Semifinals, and is best-of-three and odd-even basis, which is then followed by the Conference Championship, and the finals.

== NASCAR ==
NASCAR implemented a "playoff" system beginning in 2004, which they coined the "Chase for the NEXTEL Cup". When first introduced, only NASCAR's top series used the system, although the other two national racing series (currently known as the O'Reilly Auto Parts Series and the Craftsman Truck Series) have since adopted similar systems. One unique feature of the NASCAR playoffs is that the non-qualifying drivers continue to compete alongside the playoff drivers: the qualifying drivers merely have their championship points reset one or more times during the playoffs to figures so high that no non-qualifying driver could ever catch them.

There are actually two different playoffs going on at the end of the season in each series: one for the drivers and another "owner's points" playoff for the racing teams. Only one multi-driver team has ever won the Cup series owner's point championship: in 2015, Kyle Busch won the championship after missing the first 11 races of the season due to injury; 3 other drivers drove the No. 18 car during his absence. Because of the way the playoffs were structured that year, however, both he and his No. 18 team won their respective championships with 5043 points. There have been two cases where a playoff driver failed to enter every playoff race. In 2005, Kurt Busch was fired by Roush Racing with two races left in the season. Busch finished 10th out of 10 Chase drivers, but Kenny Wallace stepped in to drive the No. 97 car to an 8th-place finish in the owner's points race. In 2012, Dale Earnhardt Jr. missed two playoff races due to injury. Regan Smith drove the No. 88 car for two races, including a top-10 finish at Kansas Speedway. In that case, Smith's 43 additional championship points on top of Earnhardt's 2,245 were not enough to pull the No. 88 team out of 12th place out of 12 playoff contenders.

In the original version of the Chase (2004–2006), following the 26th race of the season, all drivers in the top 10 and any others within 400 points of the leader got a spot in the 10-race playoff. Like the current system, drivers in the Chase had their point totals adjusted. However, it was based on the number of points at the conclusion of the 26th race. The first-place driver in the standings led with 5,050 points; the second-place driver started with 5,045. Incremental five-point drops continued through 10th place with 5,005 points.

The first major change to the Chase was announced by NASCAR chairman and CEO Brian France on January 22, 2007. After 26 races, the top 12 drivers advanced to contend for the points championship and points were reset to 5000. Each driver within the top 12 received an additional 10 points for each win during the "regular season", or first 26 races, thus creating a seeding based on wins. As in previous years, the Chase consisted of 10 races and the driver with the most points at the conclusion of the 10 races was the NEXTEL Cup Series Champion. Under the points system then in use, drivers could earn 5 bonus points for leading the most laps, and 5 bonus points for leading a single lap. Brian France explained why NASCAR made the changes to the chase:

"The adjustments taken [Monday] put a greater emphasis on winning races. Winning is what this sport is all about. Nobody likes to see drivers content to finish in the top 10. We want our sport -- especially during the Chase -- to be more about winning."

Beginning with the 2008 season, the playoff became known as the "Chase for the Sprint Cup" due to the NEXTEL/Sprint merger.

The next format of the Chase was announced by France on January 26, 2011, along with several other changes, most significantly to the points system. After 26 races, 12 drivers still advanced to the Chase, but the qualifying criteria changed, as well as the number of base points that drivers received at the points reset.

Under this system. only the top 10 drivers in points automatically qualified for the Chase. They were joined by two "wild card" qualifiers, specifically the two drivers ranked from 11th through 20th in points who had the most race wins (with tiebreakers used if needed to select exactly two qualifiers). These drivers then had their base points reset to 2,000 instead of the previous 5,000, reflecting the greatly reduced points available from each race (a maximum of 48 for the race winner, as opposed to a maximum of 195 in the pre-2011 system). After the reset, the 10 automatic qualifiers received 3 bonus points for each race win, while the wild card qualifiers received no bonus.

On January 30, 2014, even more radical changes to the Chase were announced; these took effect for the 2014 season:

- The number of drivers qualifying for the Chase was expanded to 16, with this group officially called the NASCAR Sprint Cup Chase Grid.
- The Chase Grid is now selected primarily on the basis of race wins during the first 26 races (also known as the "regular season"). If fewer than 16 drivers win races. remaining spots on the Chase Grid are filled in order of regular-season drivers' points. Note that the basic point system has not changed from 2013.
- The Chase is now divided into four rounds. After each of the first three rounds, the four Chase Grid drivers with the fewest season points are eliminated from the Grid and championship contention. Any driver on the Chase Grid who wins a race in the first three rounds automatically advances to the next round. Also, all drivers eliminated from the Chase have their points readjusted to the regular-season points scheme, although they retain their points total from the last Chase round in which they participated.
  - Challenger Round (races 27–29)
    - Begins with 16 drivers, each with 2,000 points plus a 3-point bonus for each win in the first 26 races.
  - Contender Round (races 30–32)
    - Begins with 12 drivers, each with 3,000 points.
  - Eliminator Round (races 33–35)
    - Begins with eight drivers, each with 4,000 points.
  - NASCAR Sprint Cup Championship (final race)
    - The last four drivers in contention for the season title start the race at 5,000 points, with the highest finisher in the race winning the Cup Series title.

The Chase for the Sprint Cup has been generally panned since its inception, as many drivers and owners have criticized the declining importance of the first 26 races, as well as very little change in schedule from year to year. Mike Fisher, the director of the NASCAR Research and Development Center, has been one of the more vocal critics of the system, saying that "Due to NASCAR having the same competitors on the track week in, week out, a champion emerges. In stick-and-ball sports, every team has a different schedule, so head-to-head series are necessary to determine a champion. That does not apply to auto racing."

NASCAR extended the Chase format to its other two national touring series, the O'Reilly Auto Parts Series (then the Xfinity Series) and Craftsman Truck Series (then the Camping World Truck Series), beginning in 2016. The formats used in the two lower series are broadly similar to the format used in the Cup Series, but have some significant differences:

- The Xfinity and Truck Series Chases are held over three rounds, instead of four in the Cup Series.
- Each of the first two rounds of the Xfinity and Truck Series Chases consists of two races (compared to three in the first three rounds of the Cup Series Chase).
- The Xfinity Series Dash 4 Cash, consisting of four short events with the winners receiving cash prizes, has been incorporated into that series' Chase. A driver who wins two Dash 4 Cash events is considered as having one regular race win, which essentially qualifies the driver for the Chase even if he or she wins no other race during the season. However, there is no points bonus for Dash 4 Cash wins.
- Instead of the 16 drivers who qualify in the Cup Series, 12 drivers qualify in the Xfinity Series and 8 in the Truck Series.
- Four drivers are eliminated at the end of each of the first two rounds of the Xfinity Series Chase, as in the Cup Series. The Truck Series Chase eliminates only two drivers at the end of its first two rounds. All formats end with four drivers eligible to win the season title entering the season's last race.
- The rounds of the Chase now have a standard name across all series. The rounds leading up to the final race are now officially called "Round of X", where "X" is the number of drivers eligible for the season title. The drivers in the final race that are still eligible for the season title are called the "Championship 4".

From the 2017 season, NASCAR abandoned the term "Chase", instead calling its final series the "playoffs", in addition to adding stages which awarded additional "Playoff Points" that were added onto each points reset and kept up until the Championship 4. From the 2026 season, NASCAR would resurrect the term "Chase" as part of another change to the format that eliminated the cutoffs and "win and you're in" system used for the past twelve seasons, as well as the Playoff Points used since 2017, going back to a pre-2014 format with 16 drivers in Cup competing for the championship over 10 races. In the O'Reilly Auto Parts Series, this would be 12 drivers over 9 races and in Trucks it would be 10 drivers over 7 races.

== Rugby league ==
=== National Rugby League ===
Play-offs are used to decide the premiers of the National Rugby League (NRL) in Australasia, where they are known as finals (also as semi-finals or semis) – as in Australian rules football, the participating teams only come from within a single division, and the tournament is staged as single matches rather than a series. Currently, in the NRL, eight teams qualify for the finals; starting with the 2012 season, the system was changed from the McIntyre final eight to the same system used by the AFL.

Previously, the term play-off was used in the NSWRL and BRL competitions to describe matches which were played as tie breakers to determine qualification for the finals series. Since 1995, points differential decides finals' qualification and play-offs are no longer held.

=== Super League ===
The Super League rugby league competition has used a play-off system to decide its champion since 1998. The original play-off format featured the top five highest-ranked teams after the regular season rounds. Starting in 2002, the play-offs added an extra spot to allow the top six to qualify. With the addition of two new teams for the 2009 season, the play-offs expanded to eight teams. The next format, scrapped after the 2014 season, worked as follows:

Week One

- Qualifying play-off 1: 1st vs 4th (winner receives a bye to week three)
- Qualifying play-off 2: 2nd vs 3rd (winner receives a bye to week three)
- Elimination play-off 1: 5th vs 8th (loser goes out)
- Elimination play-off 2: 6th vs 7th (loser goes out)

Week Two

- Preliminary Semi-Final 1: QPO 1 Loser vs EPO 1 Winner
- Preliminary Semi-Final 2: QPO 2 Loser vs EPO 2 Winner

Week Three

- Qualifying Semi-Final 1: QPO 1 Winner vs PSF 1 or PSF 2 Winner *
- Qualifying Semi-Final 2: QPO 2 Winner vs PSF 1 or PSF 2 Winner *

Week Four

- Grand Final: Winners of Qualifying Semi-Finals meet at Old Trafford

* Opponents decided by the QPO winner (in Week 1) that finished higher in the regular season

Beginning in 2015, the Super League season was radically reorganised, and more closely integrated with that of the second-level Championship. Following a home-and-away season of 22 matches, the top eight clubs in Super League now enter a single round-robin mini-league known as the Super 8s, with the top four teams after that stage entering a knockout play-off to determine the champion. The four bottom teams in Super League at the end of the home-and-away season are joined by the top four from the Championship after its home-and-away season. These eight teams play their own single-round-robin mini-league known as The Qualifiers; at its end, the top three teams are assured of places in the next season's Super League, with the fourth- and fifth-place teams playing a single match billed as the "Million Pound Game", with the winner also playing in Super League in the following season.

=== Other leagues ===
The two tiers directly below Super League, the Championship and League 1 (the latter of which was known as Championship 1 from 2009 to 2014)—formerly the National Leagues until the 2009 addition of a French club to the previously all-British competition—used the old top six system to determine which teams were promoted between its levels through the 2014 season. After that season, both leagues abandoned the top six system. Before the 2008 season, when Super League established a franchising system and ended automatic promotion and relegation in Super League, the National Leagues also used this system to determine the team that earned promotion to Super League. The top six system involved the following:

Week One

- Elimination Semi-final A: 3rd vs 6th (4th vs 7th in Championship 1)
- Elimination Semi-final B: 4th vs 5th (5th vs 6th in Championship 1)

Week Two

- Elimination Final: Winners of Elimination Semi-final A vs Winners of Elimination Semi-final B
- Qualification Match: 1st vs 2nd (2nd vs 3rd in Championship 1)

Week Three

- Final Qualifier: Winners of Elimination Final vs Losers of Qualification Match

Week Four

- Grand Final: Winners of Qualification Match vs Winners of Final Qualifier (in Super League, at Old Trafford)

Since 2015, all clubs in Super League and the Championship play a 22-match home-and-away season. Upon the end of the home-and-away season, the clubs will split into three leagues, with two of them including Championship clubs. The Super 8s will feature the top eight Super League sides. The second league, The Qualifiers, will include the bottom four clubs from Super League and the top four from the Championship, whilst the third will feature the remaining eight Championship sides. The bottom two leagues will begin as single round-robin tournaments. In The Qualifiers, the top three sides will either remain in or be promoted to Super League, with the fourth- and fifth-place teams playing the aforementioned "Million Pound Game" for the final Super League place. In the third league, the sides compete for the Championship Shield, with the top four teams after the round-robin phase entering a knockout playoff for the Shield. The bottom two teams are relegated to League 1.

League 1 currently conducts a 15-match, single round-robin regular season. At that time, the league splits in two. The top eight clubs play in their own Super 8s, also contested as a single round robin. At the end of the Super 8s, the top club earns the season title and immediate promotion to the Championship. The second- through fifth-place clubs contest a knockout playoff for the second place in the Championship. The bottom eight clubs play their own single round-robin phase; at its end, the top two teams play a one-off match for the League 1 Shield.

== Rugby union ==
=== England ===
==== Premiership ====
In the Gallagher Premiership, the top four qualify for the play-offs, where they are not referred to by that name. The tournament is a Shaughnessy playoff: the team that finished first after the league stage plays the team that finished fourth, while the team that finished second plays the team that finished third in the Semi-Finals, with the higher-ranked team having home advantage. The winners of these semi-finals qualify for the Premiership Final at Twickenham, where the winner will be champions of the league.

==== Championship ====
Through the 2016–17 season, the second-level RFU Championship used play-offs—but unlike the Premiership, the Championship officially used the term "play-offs". At the end of the league stage, top teams advanced to a series of promotion play-offs. From the first season of the Championship in 2009–10 to 2011–12, the top eight teams advanced; from 2012–13 through to 2016–17, the top four advanced. A relegation play-off involving the bottom four teams existed through the 2011–12 season, but was scrapped from 2012 to 2013 on.

The original promotion play-offs divided the eight teams into two groups of four each, with the teams within each group playing a home-and-away mini-league. The top two teams in each group advanced to a knockout phase. In 2010, the semi-finals were one-off matches; in 2011, they became two-legged. The top team in each pool played the second-place team from the other group in the semi-finals; the winners advanced to the two-legged final, where the ultimate winner earned promotion to the Premiership (assuming that the team met the minimum criteria for promotion).

In the first year of the play-offs in 2010, all eight teams started equal. After that season, it was decided to reward teams for their performance in league play. in 2011 and 2012, the top two teams at the end of the league stage carried over 3 competition points to the promotion play-offs; the next two teams carried over 2; the next two carried over 1; and the final two teams carried over none. (Points were earned using the standard bonus points system.)

The relegation play-offs, like the first stage of the promotion play-offs, were conducted as a home-and-away league, with the bottom team at the end of league play relegated to National League 1. As with the 2010 promotion play-offs, that season's relegation play-offs started all teams equal. in 2011 and 2012, each team in the relegation play-offs carried over 1 competition point for every win in the league season.

Beginning with the 2012–13 season, the pool stage of the promotion playoffs was abolished, with the top four sides directly entering the semi-finals. The format of the knockout stage remained unchanged from 2012, with two-legged semi-finals followed by a two-legged final. At the other end of the table, the bottom club is now automatically relegated.

Effective with the 2017–18 season, the promotion play-offs were scrapped for a minimum of three seasons, to be replaced with automatic promotion for the club finishing atop the league at the end of the home-and-away season (provided said club meets minimum Premiership standards).

=== France ===
The highest level of French rugby union, the Top 14, expanded its playoffs starting with the 2009–10 season from a four-team format to six teams. In the new system, the top two teams after the double round-robin season receive first-round byes. The first-round matches involve the third- through sixth-place teams, bracketed so that 3 hosts 6 and 4 hosts 5. The winners then advance to face the top two teams in the semifinals, which are held at nominally neutral sites (a traditional feature in the French playoffs)—although in the 2011–12 season, the semifinals were held at Stadium de Toulouse, occasionally used as a "big-game" venue by traditional Top 14 power Stade Toulousain. The winners of these semifinals qualify for the final at Stade de France (though in 2016, the final was at Camp Nou in Barcelona due to conflict with UEFA Euro 2016), where the winner will be champions of the league and receive the Bouclier de Brennus. Before 2009–10, the playoffs format was identical to that of the English Premiership with the exception of neutral sites for the semifinals.

Beginning in 2017–18, only the bottom club is automatically relegated to Rugby Pro D2. The second-from-bottom Top 14 side plays a one-off match against the runner-up of the Pro D2 playoffs for the final place in the next Top 14 season.

Pro D2 adopted the Top 14 playoff system effective in 2017–18, though with all matches held at the higher seed's home field. The playoff champion earns automatic promotion; the runner-up enters a one-off match for potential promotion to Top 14. Previously, Pro D2 used a four-team playoff, involving the second- through fifth-place teams, to determine the second of two teams promoted to the next season's Top 14, with the regular-season champions earning automatic promotion. Under this system, the promotion semifinals were held at the home fields of the second- and third-place teams, and the promotion final was held at a neutral site.

=== United Rugby Championship ===
The United Rugby Championship (URC), originally known as the Celtic League and later as Pro12 and Pro14, adopted a four-team playoff starting with the 2009–10 season. The format was essentially identical to that of the English Premiership. Through the 2013–14 season, the final was held at a ground chosen by the top surviving seed, with the caveat that the venue must have a capacity of at least 18,000. In 2012–13, top seed Ulster could not use its regular home ground of Ravenhill for that reason (the ground was later expanded to meet the requirement). The league changed to using a predetermined site for its championship final in 2014–15.

With the addition of two South African sides in 2017–18, the league split into two conferences and expanded its playoffs to six teams. The top team of each conference earns a bye into the semifinals, where they will host the winners of matches between the second- and third-place teams from the other conferences (with the second-place team hosting the third-place team from the opposite conference).

After the 2020–21 season, both South African sides left the league and were replaced by the country's four former Super Rugby franchises, with the competition being rebranded as the URC. The league split into four regionally based pools—one each for Ireland, South Africa, and Wales, plus a joint Italian–Scottish pool. While the top team of each pool at the end of the regular season will receive a trophy branded as a regional "Shield" and automatic qualification for the following season's European Rugby Champions Cup, all teams are combined into a single table for purposes of playoff qualification. The top eight teams advance to knockout playoffs, with the higher seed hosting all matches leading up to the championship final, which continues to be held at a predetermined site.

=== New Zealand ===
Both domestic competitions in New Zealand rugby — the semi-professional National Provincial Championship (known by several sponsored names) and the nominally amateur Heartland Championship — use a playoff system to determine their champions, although the term "playoff" is also not used in New Zealand, with "finals" used instead.

==== National Provincial Championship ====
In the 2006 Air New Zealand Cup, the first season of the revamped domestic structure in that country, the top six teams after Round One of the competition automatically qualified for the finals, officially known as Round Three. Their relative seeding was determined by their standings at the end of the Top Six phase of Round Two. The teams that finished below the top six entered repechage pools in Round Two, with the winner of each pool taking up one of the final two finals slots. The seventh seed was the repechage winner with the better record, and the eighth seed was the other repechage winner.

From 2007 onward, the former Rounds One and Two were collapsed into a single pool phase of play in which all teams participated. In 2007 and 2008, the top eight teams advanced to the playoffs; in what was intended to be the final season of the Air New Zealand Cup format in 2009, the Shaughnessy format was used, with the top four advancing to the finals. The New Zealand Rugby Union (NZRU) ultimately decided to stay with the previous format for the rebranded 2010 ITM Cup, with the same four-team playoff as in 2009. Starting in 2011, the NZRU split the ITM Cup into two seven-team leagues, the top-level Premiership and second-level Championship, and instituted promotion and relegation in the ITM Cup (a feature of the country's former National Provincial Championship). The competition was renamed the Mitre 10 Cup in 2016.

The playoffs in each season format have consisted of a single-elimination tournament. The teams are bracketed in the normal fashion, with the higher seed receiving home-field advantage. In 2007 and 2008, the playoff was rebracketed after the quarterfinals, with the highest surviving seed hosting the lowest surviving seed and the second-highest surviving seed hosting the third surviving seed. The winners of these semifinals qualify for the Cup Final (2006–10) or Premiership/Championship Final (2011–), held at the home ground of the higher surviving seed. From 2011 onward, the winner of the Championship Final is promoted to the Premiership, replacing that league's bottom team.

Because the 2011 season ran up against that year's Rugby World Cup in New Zealand, the competition window was truncated, with only the top two teams in each division advancing to the final match. The Shaughnessy finals series returned to both divisions in 2012, and is currently used in non-World Cup years.

==== Heartland Championship ====
In the Heartland Championship, teams play for two distinct trophies — the more prestigious Meads Cup and the Lochore Cup. The 12 Heartland Championship teams are divided into two pools for round-robin play in Round One, with the top three in each pool advancing to the Meads Cup and the bottom three dropping to the Lochore Cup.

Round Two in both the Meads and Lochore Cups is an abbreviated round-robin tournament, with each team playing only the teams it did not play in Round One. The top four teams in the Meads Cup pool at the end of Round Two advance to the Meads Cup semifinals; the same applies for the Lochore Cup contestants.

The semifinals of both cups are seeded 1 vs 4 and 2 vs 3, with the higher seeds earning home field advantage. The semifinal winners advance to their respective cup final, hosted by the higher surviving seed.

=== Super Rugby ===
Throughout the pre-2011 history of Super Rugby—both in the Super 12 and Super 14 formats—the competition's organiser, SANZAR (renamed SANZAAR in 2016), held a Shaughnessy playoff involving the top four teams. The top two teams on the league ladder each hosted a semifinal, with the top surviving team hosting the final.

In May 2009, SANZAR announced that it would adopt an expanded playoff when the competition added a new Australian team for the 2011 season. Through 2015, the Super Rugby playoff involved six teams—the winners of each of three conferences (Australia, New Zealand and South Africa conferences), plus the three non-winners with the most competition points without regard to conference affiliation.

The top two conference winners received a first-round bye; each played at home against the winner of an elimination match involving two of the four other playoff teams. As in the previous system, the final was hosted by the top surviving seed.

Further expansion of the competition in 2016 to 18 teams, with one extra entry from South Africa and new teams based in Argentina and Japan, saw the playoff bracket expand to eight teams. The teams were split into African and Australasian groups, with the Argentine and Japanese teams joining the African group. Each group in turn was divided into two conferences (Australia, New Zealand, Africa 1, Africa 2). Conference winners received the top four playoff seeds, and were joined by the top three remaining Australasian teams and the top remaining team from the African group on table points, again without regard to conference affiliation. The higher seed still hosted all playoff matches, including the final.

With the contraction of the league to 15 teams for 2018, with one Australian and two South African teams being axed, the playoff format changed yet again. The number of conferences was reduced from four to three—Australia, New Zealand and South Africa, with the Argentine team joining the South Africa conference and the Japanese team joining the Australia conference. The playoff will remain at eight teams, with the three conference winners joined by five "wildcards", specifically the top remaining teams without regard to conference affiliation. The conference winners and the top wildcard will host quarterfinals, with all remaining matches hosted by the higher seed.

== Summary ==
League	Sport	Purpose	Teams in playoffs	Teams with byes	Number of rounds	Neutral site final?
National Football League	American football	League championship	14	2	4	Yes
X-League	American football	League championship	8	0	3	Yes (mostly held at neutral site)
Australian Football League	Australian rules football	League championship	8	0	4	Varies (held at same ground each season)
UEFA Champions League	Association football	League championship	24	8	5	Yes
English Football League	Association football	Promotion	4	0	2	Yes
A-League Men	Association football	League championship	6	2	3	No
Major League Soccer	Association football	League championship	18	14	5	No
Major League Baseball	Baseball	League championship	12	4	4	No
Nippon Professional Baseball	Baseball	League championship	6	2	3	No
National Basketball Association	Basketball	League championship	16	0	4	No
EuroLeague	Basketball	League championship	8	0	3	Yes
Women's National Basketball Association	Basketball	League championship	8	0	4	No
Canadian Football League	Canadian football	League championship	6	2	3	Yes
Big Bash League	Cricket	League championship	4	0	3	No
Indian Premier League	Cricket	League championship	4	0	3	Yes
Super Smash	Cricket	League championship	3	1	2	No
National Hockey League	Ice hockey	League championship	16	0	4	No
Kontinental Hockey League	Ice hockey	League championship	16	0	4	No
Super Netball	Netball	League championship	4	0	3	No
National Rugby League	Rugby league	League championship	8	0	4	Varies (held at same ground each season)
Super League	Rugby league	League championship	6	2	3	Yes (held at same ground each season)
Premiership Rugby	Rugby union	League championship	4	0	2	Yes (held at same ground each season)
United Rugby Championship	Rugby union	League championship	8	0	3	Yes
Super Rugby	Rugby union	League championship	8	0	3	No
Top 14	Rugby union	League championship	6	2	3	Yes

== See also ==
- Playoff format
- Shaughnessy playoff system
- Playoff beard
- Season (sports)
- Grand Final
- Reality television
