= NRL finals system =

National Rugby League playoffs

NRL finals series
- Current season, competition or edition: 2026 NRL finals series
- Sport: Rugby league
- Founded: 1916
- No. of teams: 8
- Most recent champion: Sydney Roosters (16th title) (2026 NRL finals series)
- Most titles: South Sydney Rabbitohs (21 titles)
- Broadcasters: Channel 9 Fox League

The NRL finals system has been used by the National Rugby League competition of Australia and New Zealand since 2012. The NRL finals system replaced the McIntyre system which was used from 1999 to 2011.

A similar system was previously used by the Australian Rugby League in the 1995 and 1996 seasons; however, there was no crossover in 1995, and in 1996 teams crossed over in Week 2, rather than Week 3. The system has also been adopted by the Victorian Football League and a slightly modified version adopted by Super League. The Australian Football League (AFL) also use this system and have done so since 2000.

The highest-ranked eight teams at the end of the regular season participate in a four-week tournament, with two teams eliminated in each of the first three weeks. The seventh team is eliminated (and the premiership awarded) in the grand final.

The system is designed to give the top four teams an easier road to the grand final than the second four teams, in order to reward regular season success. The top four needs to win only two finals to reach the grand final, while the second four needs to win three; and, two of the top four teams receive a bye in the second week of the playoff and then play at home in the third week, while the other two play at home in the second week.

== Current system ==
Qualifying and elimination finals
1st qualifying final
1	1st	Home
4	4th	Away
1st elimination final
5	5th	Home
8	8th	Away
2nd elimination final
6	6th	Home
7	7th	Away
2nd qualifying final
2	2nd	Home
3	3rd	Away

Semi-finals
1st semi-final
Loser of QF1	Home
Winner of EF 1	Away
2nd semi-final
Winner of EF2	Away
Loser of QF2	Home

Preliminary finals
1st preliminary final
Winner of QF1	Home
Winner of SF2	Away
2nd preliminary final
Winner of SF1	Away
Winner of QF2	Home

Grand final
NRL Grand Final – Stadium Australia
Winner of PF1	Accor Stadium
Winner of PF2	Accor Stadium

=== Finals format ===
==== Week one ====
- 1st qualifying final: 1st ranked team hosts 4th ranked team
- 2nd qualifying final: 2nd ranked team hosts 3rd ranked team
- 1st elimination final: 5th ranked team hosts 8th ranked team
- 2nd elimination final: 6th ranked team hosts 7th ranked team

The eight finalists are split into two groups for the opening week of the finals series. The top four teams have the best chance of winning the premiership and play the two qualifying finals. The winners get a bye through to week three of the tournament to play home preliminary finals, while the losers play home semi-finals in week two. The bottom four teams play the two elimination finals, where the winners advance to week two away games and the losers' seasons are over. The scheduling of each of the four games is at the discretion of the NRL.

==== Week two ====
- 1st semi-final: Loser of 1st QF hosts winner of 1st EF
- 2nd semi-final: Loser of 2nd QF hosts winner of 2nd EF

==== Week three ====
- 1st preliminary final: Winner of 1st QF hosts winner of 2nd SF.
- 2nd preliminary final: Winner of 2nd QF hosts winner of 1st SF.

==== Week four ====
- Grand final: Winner of 1st PF meets winner of 2nd PF at Accor Stadium on a Sunday night with the game starting at about 7.15pm.

== Extra time ==
In the event of tied scores at the end of the 80 minutes of a rugby league match, two five minute periods of extra time occur. If the scores are not then settled, an unlimited period of golden point will take place. This ensures that none of the matches are draws. Before 2016, the match went straight into golden point time. This most notably occurred in the 2015 NRL Grand Final, when the North Queensland Cowboys defeated the Brisbane Broncos thanks to a Johnathan Thurston field goal. This triggered the change as despite the Cowboys kicking off, due to Ben Hunt knocking the ball on off the kick-off, the Broncos didn't get to play a set with the ball.

== Advantages for ladder positions ==
Under this finals system, the final eight teams are broken up into four groups of two. Each group of two earns one extra benefit over the teams beneath it. These benefits are home ground finals and the double-chance, whereby a first-week loss will not eliminate the team from the finals. Note that the "home" designations may be irrelevant for games played between teams from the same state – all finals games played between two Sydney based teams will be held at Allianz Stadium or Accor Stadium, regardless of the "home" team's home ground.

=== First and second ===
First and second receive the double-chance, and will play their first two finals matches at home: their qualifying final, and then either a semi-final if they lose their qualifying final or a preliminary final if they win their qualifying final. They need to win two finals to reach the grand final.

=== Third and fourth ===
Third and fourth also receive the double-chance, but receive only one finals match at home: either a semi-final if they lose their qualifying final or a preliminary final if they win their qualifying final. They need to win two finals to reach the grand final.

=== Fifth and sixth ===
Fifth and sixth receive one home final: their elimination final. They need to win three finals to reach the grand final.

=== Seventh and eighth ===
Seventh and eighth receive no home finals. They need to win three finals to reach the grand final.

== Venues ==
In the first week of finals, the higher ranked team from the regular season hosts at their regular home ground. In the second week, the higher ranked team again hosts; however, Sydney teams must host at one of the major stadiums, those being CommBank Stadium, the Sydney Cricket Ground, the Allianz Stadium, and Accor Stadium. In the third week of finals, the qualifying final winner hosts, again if it's a Sydney team, at one of those major venues. The NRL Grand Final is then held every year at Accor Stadium in week four of the finals.

The Sydney Cricket Ground has hosted the most finals clashes, followed by the Sydney Football Stadium and Stadium Australia.

== Criticism ==
The new finals system was introduced after the 2011 season, after debate had raged for several years before that. In 2008 for the first time ever the 8th placed team (New Zealand Warriors) beat the 1st placed team (Melbourne Storm) in week one of the finals. In 2009, the scenario occurred for the 2nd time ever when the Parramatta Eels defeated the St. George Illawarra Dragons. In both case, these teams then went on to have home advantage in the second week of the finals, leading to criticism from fans and pundits that too much of an advantage was being given to lower placed teams. However, under the current system the 7th and 8th placed teams can never have a home finals match – a move which seems designed to eliminate the possibility of a team making a late charge towards the grand final despite finishing relatively low in the regular season. This has led to criticism that the current system has rendered having a top 8 pointless because some of the teams are there simply to make up numbers as it has been made far too difficult for them to progress very far into the finals series. Despite this, in 2017, the eight-placed North Queensland Cowboys were able to reach the grand final, where they were defeated by the minor premiers, the Melbourne Storm.

It has also been noted that criticism of the previous McIntyre system has come primarily from coaches and players after their team has been eliminated from the finals by a lower ranked team. Complaints about the system from teams that have won games they were expected to win seem far less prevalent.

== See also ==
- AFL final eight system
- Super League play-offs
