= McIntyre final eight system =

Playoff system

The McIntyre final eight system was devised by Ken McIntyre in addition to the McIntyre Four, Five and Six systems. It is a playoff system of the top 8 finishers in a competition to determine which two teams will play in the grand final. The teams play each other over three weeks, with two teams eliminated each week. Teams who finish in a higher position in the competition are given an easier route to the grand final.

In top-level sport, the system was used by the Australian Football League from 1994 until 1999, and by the National Rugby League from 1999 to 2011.

== How it works ==
Week 1

- 4th qualifying final: 1st v 8th
- 3rd qualifying final: 2nd v 7th
- 2nd qualifying final: 3rd v 6th
- 1st qualifying final: 4th v 5th

The organisation of the rest of the finals series is dependent upon whether teams won or lost in week 1 and their final ranking on the ladder before the finals. The two lowest-ranked losers are eliminated from the finals, while the two highest-ranked winners progress straight to week 3.

Week 2

- 1st semi final: 4th highest-ranked winner v 2nd highest-ranked loser
- 2nd semi final: 3rd highest-ranked winner (from week 1) v highest-ranked loser (from week 1)

The two losing teams are eliminated, the two winning teams progress to week 3.

Week 3

- 1st preliminary final: highest-ranked winner (from week 1) v winner of 1st semi final
- 2nd preliminary final: 2nd highest-ranked winner (from week 1) v winner of 2nd semi final

The two losing teams are eliminated, the two winning teams progress to week four.

Week 4

- Grand final: winner of 1st preliminary final v winner of 2nd preliminary final

Scheduling

A key element of an effective McIntyre system is scheduling in week 1. In the first week games must be played in the following order: 4 v 5, 3 v 6, 2 v 7, 1 v 8. Teams in the first two games are playing for the chance of a bye in the second week of the finals. If the final two games ultimately go as predicted, then the chance of a bye or the risk of elimination disappears. Therefore, those games need to be played last so that there is never a situation where two teams know that their result would not matter.

Permutations

- 1st: Advances with a win to preliminary final (week 3), must play the semi-final with a loss, cannot be eliminated in week 1, and has an 18.75% of winning the tournament.
- 2nd: Same as 1st, but has a more difficult opponent in week 1 (7th instead 8th).
- 3rd: Advances to preliminary final with a win and at least one upset in the two last qualifying finals (1st or 2nd loses their qualifying final). Must play the semi-final with a win and no upset in the two last qualifying finals or a loss and at least one upset in the two last qualifying finals. Has a 15.625% of winning the tournament.
- 4th: Advances to preliminary final with a win and at least two upsets in remaining qualifying finals. They must play the semi-final if there are one or no upsets in other qualifying finals, regardless of result. Is eliminated with a loss and two or more upsets. Has a 12.5% of winning the tournament.
- 5th: Same as 4th but play away in qualifying final against 4th.
- 6th: Advances to preliminary final with a win and 7th and 8th win their qualifying finals. Must play the semi-final with a win and, if there is, at least, one hopeful result, OR, if he loses, if there are BOTH hopeful results in remaining qualifying finals. Is eliminated with a loss AND one upset, at least, in remaining qualifying finals. Has a 9.375% of winning the tournament.
- 7th: Cannot advance straight to preliminary final. Advances to semi final with a win and is eliminated with a loss. Has a 6.25% of winning the tournament.
- 8th: Same as 7th but has a more difficult opponent in week 1 (1st instead 2nd).

1st, 2nd, 7th and 8th depend on themselves. 3rd, 4th, 5th and 6th depend on their results and other qualifying finals results

== Example ==
The 2010 NRL Final Series:

Qualifying finals
1	St. George Illawarra	28
8	Manly	0
2	Penrith	22
7	Canberra	24
3	Wests	15
6	Sydney	19
4	Gold Coast	28
5	New Zealand	16

Semifinals
4W	Canberra	24
2L	Wests	26
3W	Sydney	34
1L	Penrith	12

Preliminary finals
1W	St. George Illawarra	13
Wests	12
2W	Gold Coast	6
Sydney	32

Final
St. George Illawarra	32
Sydney	8

At the qualifying finals, team 1 won and so went straight through to the preliminary finals. Team 4 also went through to the preliminary finals, because they won while teams 2 and 3 lost. However, teams 2 and 3 were not eliminated, but played again in the semi-finals, because two teams ranking lower than them on the ladder also lost. Those two losing teams ranking lower than them, teams 5 and 8, were eliminated.

== Advantages ==
The major advantages of the system are the number of different combinations of teams which could make the final game and that no matches are repeated in the first three weeks. When compared to other final eight systems, many of which split the participants into two groups, the McIntyre system means only two of the 28 possible combinations (1v7 and 2v8) are impossible in the grand final.

The top two teams after the regular season are rewarded by being given a 'second life' within the finals. If either of these two teams lose to their much lower-ranked opponents in the first week, then one of the two losing teams ranked lower than them are eliminated, which means the 1st- and 2nd-ranked teams can withstand a loss in the finals and their season will continue, albeit with significant disadvantages.

This 'second life' advantage for the highest-ranked teams on the ladder can flow on to teams 3 and 4 (and possibly teams 5 and 6.) If only one of the top two on the ladder loses in the first week, then team 3 is not eliminated if it has lost. Similarly, if only one of the top three on the ladder loses in the first week, then team 4 is saved from elimination if it has lost.

If the top two teams win in the first week, then teams 7 and 8 will be the ones to be eliminated. Only two teams drop out, so even if they were to lose their games, teams 5 and 6 would still have another chance in the second week.

== Criticisms ==
With its adoption by the NRL, debate has arisen over its fairness. The McIntyre system rewards teams who have form coming into the finals rather than during the whole season. The advantages given to a victor in the first week of the finals, even if that team is initially ranked 6th to 8th, includes a home final in the second week against a team ranked 3rd to 6th coming off a loss. This advantage given to lower-ranked teams that win in the first week are significant compared to the alternate final 8 system used by the AFL, which protects teams coming 1st to 4th from elimination and never give home finals to teams ranked 7th or 8th, regardless of whether they win or lose their matches.

In 2008, the first week of the NRL finals saw the then reigning grand finalists the Melbourne Storm lose to the 8th-placed New Zealand Warriors. Granted a home final as a week 1 winner, the Warriors then defeated the Sydney Roosters in the second week and proceeded to the final 4, the first team ever to make it that far from 8th position, whereas the Storm had to travel to Brisbane and win away to continue on. This scenario was exceeded in 2009 when the Parramatta Eels, who had finished 8th defeated St George Illawarra Dragons. Parramatta, with a home advantage, proceeded to defeat the Gold Coast Titans in week 2, whereas the Dragons were eliminated from the competition in week 2 in their away match against the Brisbane Broncos. This gave them the dubious distinction of being the first minor premiers to be eliminated after two consecutive losses since the inception of the McIntyre system. Parramatta became the first team ranked last of the finalists to contest the grand final, only to lose to the 4th-placed Melbourne Storm, although this Premiership has been struck from the record due to salary cap breaches by the Storm. For the record, at least one top four team has lost its qualifying final in every year since this system was introduced in 1999, until 2011 when all top four teams won their qualifying final.

Another criticism is that, like many other top-8 systems, there is the possibility of games in the first week that are effectively meaningless, where teams have no risk of elimination and results only determine respective opponents and home ground advantage in the second week. In the McIntyre system if first-week results go as planned, then first defeats eighth and second defeats seventh. This leaves the teams who finished from third to sixth effectively playing "dead rubbers" in the first week, with the results merely reshuffling the order of these four teams. There is a requirement therefore that the 4v5 contest be played first. This raises a further criticism that the fate of the loser in this match is dependent upon the performance of the higher-ranked teams. A good example of this was the Dragons v Penrith final in 2004. The Dragons lost by a mere point, however, due to the higher ranked Bulldogs and Broncos losing the Dragons were eliminated.

This also makes scheduling much less flexible, since the first vs eighth game must be the last game played, in order to prevent the teams between third and sixth entering their qualifying finals knowing that the game is already a dead rubber. The newly formed ARL Commission accepted a recommendation to scrap the system as of 2012 on 22 February 2012. It was replaced by the final eight system currently used by the AFL.

Another anomaly of scheduling is that in the second week a team may play a higher-ranked opponent than the team they defeated, and similarly a first week loser may play an easier opponent than the team that defeated them. In the second week of the McIntyre system the third-highest winner (i.e. the strongest winner of those playing) plays the highest-ranked loser rather than the second highest loser (i.e. the weakest loser). This may ensure no repetition of games in the second week, but it means higher-ranked teams end up with more difficult opponents simply for the sake of more interesting scheduling. An example of this happened in 2005 when the Wests Tigers (4th) defeated the North Queensland Cowboys (5th) in week one of the finals and were 'rewarded' in week 2 with a game against the 3rd placed Brisbane Broncos. Meanwhile, the Cowboys (ranked 5th and first week losers) played the Melbourne Storm who were ranked 6th.

In 2011, the 6th-placed New Zealand Warriors were beaten convincingly by the Brisbane Broncos (ranked 3rd) in its qualifying final by the score of 40–10. Following that match, then-Warriors coach Ivan Cleary was quoted as saying "the way we played tonight, we don't deserve to be in the finals". That loss saw them at risk of being eliminated initially, but were granted a reprieve after the two lower-ranking teams, North Queensland and Newcastle, also lost their finals. A sudden reverse in form would see them advance to the grand final, thus becoming the third team (after the St. George Illawarra Dragons in 1999 and the Sydney Roosters the season previous), to advance to the grand final after finishing sixth at the end of the season. Ultimately, the Warriors would lose to the second-placed Manly-Warringah Sea Eagles who had a much easier run to the decider.

== Competitions ==
In addition to the NRL, the McIntyre final eight system is also used in the Rugby League National League Three in Great Britain, the NSWRL Premier League and Jersey Flegg competitions. It will be used in the final heads up in Circuito Nacional de Poker (Spain).

== See also ==
- Top five play-offs
- McIntyre system
- AFL final eight system
- 2009-2014 Super League system, another final-8 system with a twist
