= McIntyre system =

Playoff system

The McIntyre system, or systems as there have been five of them, is a playoff system that gives an advantage to teams or competitors qualifying higher, by allowing higher qualified teams to lose more games or series before being eliminated compared to lower qualified teams. The systems, which include four-team, five-team, six-team and eight-team variants, were developed by Australian lawyer, historian and English lecturer Ken McIntyre, with the first system developed for the Victorian Football League in 1931.

The four-team and five-team variants in particular are widely used in Australian sports, and the four-team variant – also known as the Page playoff system – enjoys some wider use globally.

== In the VFL/AFL ==
The first McIntyre system, the Page–McIntyre system, also known as the Page playoff system or McIntyre final four system, was adopted by the VFL in 1931, to replace the "amended Argus systems" that had operated since 1902.

McIntyre also devised the McIntyre final five system for the VFL for 1972, the McIntyre final six system for 1991 (which was revised for 1992) and the McIntyre final eight system for the 1994 season.

The AFL and its fans grew dissatisfied with some of the outcomes the McIntyre final eight system might allow, and replaced it with another final eight system in 2000.

== Other competitions ==
McIntyre finals systems are used prominently throughout Australia. Most Australian rules football leagues, from professional down to suburban, use a McIntyre finals system. The New South Wales Rugby League/National Rugby League has used the McIntyre final four and final five at different times throughout its history, and used the McIntyre final eight system from 1999 until 2011. The Page–McIntyre system is also used in the ANZ Championships (netball), the Australian Baseball League and Women's National Basketball League. It was also used in the A-League (soccer) before that competition expanded its finals series to a top-six format. It is also used in the Indian Premier League (cricket).

Under the name Page playoff system, the McIntyre final four is commonly used in softball and curling events, especially in Canada. The system was also used in the Rugby League National League Three in Great Britain for the 2004 season.

A hybrid version of the Page–McIntyre system was used in Big Bash League in Australia between the 2019–2020 and 2022-2023 season, the difference between the original version and the hybrid version was a fifth game was played between 4th and 5th placed team playing in an elimination final with the winner playing 3rd in the first semi-final, a game that is usually played between 3rd and 4th in the original version of the system.

In North America, since 2021, it has been used as the preliminary round of the NBA Playoffs as a 'play-in tournament' to determine the seventh and eighth seeds for the main playoff tournament, with seeds 7 and 8 playing, then seeds 9 and 10, with the winner of the 7/8 game being the seventh seed, and the loser of the 7/8 game and winner of the 9/10 game competing for the eighth seed.

== The systems ==
=== Page–McIntyre system ===
Round	Match	Name	Team 1		Team 2
1	A	1st semi-final	Rank 3	v	Rank 4
1	B	2nd semi-final	Rank 1	v	Rank 2
2	C	Preliminary final	Loser B	v	Winner A
3	D	Grand final	Winner B	v	Winner C

The Page–McIntyre system features four teams. In the first round of the Page–McIntyre system, the highest-two-ranked teams play each other, with the winner going straight through to the grand final and the loser going through to the preliminary final. The lowest-two-ranked teams play each other, and the winner advances to the preliminary final. The winner of preliminary final gets through to the grand final. In this system, the top two teams are able to lose a match and still qualify for the grand final, this is referred to as a 'double chance'.

Assuming that each team has an even chance of winning each match, the probability for both the highest-ranked teams winning the competition is 37.5%, compared to 12.5% for the third and fourth placed teams.

=== McIntyre final five system ===
Round	Match	Name	Team 1		Team 2
1	A	Elimination final	Rank 4	v	Rank 5
1	B	Qualifying final	Rank 2	v	Rank 3
2	C	1st semi-final	Loser B	v	Winner A
2	D	2nd semi-final	Rank 1	v	Winner B
3	E	Preliminary final	Loser D	v	Winner C
4	F	Grand final	Winner D	v	Winner E

As its name states, the McIntyre final five system features five teams. From the second round the McIntyre final five system is the same as the Page–McIntyre system; however, in the first round the lowest-two-ranked teams play to eliminate one team and the second and third-ranked teams determine which match they will play in the second round. The highest-ranked team has a bye in the first round.

In this case, if all teams have an even chance of winning each match, the highest-ranked team has a 37.5% chance, ranks two and three have a 25% chance and the lowest-two-ranked teams have a 6.25% chance of winning the competition.

=== First McIntyre final six system ===
Round	Match	Name	Team 1		Team 2
1	A	1st elimination final	Rank 5	v	Rank 6
1	B	2nd elimination final	Rank 3	v	Rank 4
1	C	Qualifying final	Rank 1	v	Rank 2
2	D	1st semi-final	Loser C	v	Winner A
2	E	2nd semi-final	Winner C	v	Winner B
3	F	Preliminary final	Loser E	v	Winner D
4	G	Grand final	Winner E	v	Winner F

The first McIntyre final six system was also the same as the Page–McIntyre system from the second round. In this case, two of the four-lowest-ranked teams are eliminated in the first round, while the top two determine which match they will play in the second round. Under this system the top two teams receive a double chance, as does the winner of match B.

=== Second McIntyre final six system ===
Round	Match	Name	Team 1		Team 2
1	A	1st elimination final	Rank 4	v	Rank 5
1	B	2nd elimination final	Rank 3	v	Rank 6
1	C	Qualifying final	Rank 1	v	Rank 2
2	D	1st semi-final	Loser C	v	Lower-ranked winner from A, B
2	E	2nd semi-final	Winner C	v	Higher-ranked winner from A, B
3	F	Preliminary final	Loser E	v	Winner D
4	G	Grand final	Winner E	v	Winner F

This adaptation of the first McIntyre system corrected for the anomaly that, in the first week, the team who finished 4th would have a more difficult opponent than the team who finished 5th, and was hence more likely to be eliminated, despite finishing higher. This was achieved by adding flexibility to the second round draw, so that the two elimination final winners were re-ranked to determine which played the winner of the qualifying final and which played the loser.

However, both McIntyre final six systems had another weakness: the loser of the qualifying final (which is the most difficult game of the first round), ended up facing elimination in the first semi-final, while the higher-ranked elimination final winner (who has had the easiest game of the first round) has a double chance in the second semi-final.

=== McIntyre final eight system ===
Round	Match	Name	Team 1		Team 2
1	A	1st qualifying final	Rank 4	v	Rank 5
1	B	2nd qualifying final	Rank 3	v	Rank 6
1	C	3rd qualifying final	Rank 2	v	Rank 7
1	D	4th qualifying final	Rank 1	v	Rank 8
2	E	2nd semi-final	4th-highest-ranked winner from A, B, C, D	v	2nd-highest-ranked loser from A, B, C, D
2	F	1st semi-final	3rd-highest-ranked winner from A, B, C, D	v	Highest-ranked loser from A, B, C, D
3	G	2nd Preliminary final	2nd-highest-ranked winner from A, B, C, D	v	Winner F
3	H	1st Preliminary final	Highest-ranked winner from A, B, C, D	v	Winner E
4	I	Grand final	Winner G	v	Winner H

The McIntyre final eight bears little in common with the other McIntyre systems. At no stage does it follow the Page–McIntyre structure, and at no stage after the first week does any team retain a double chance. The system allows for 26 of the 28 combinations of the eight finalists to feature in the grand final (the two combinations not possible are 1st v 7th and 2nd v 8th). It gives 18.75% to 1st and 2nd, 15.625% to 3rd, 12.5% to 4th and 5th, 9.375% to 6th and 6.25% to 7th and 8th.

== See also ==
- NRL finals system
- AFL finals series
- Top five play-offs
- McIntyre final eight system
- AFL final eight system, adopted by the AFL to address perceived problems in the McIntyre final eight
- Super League play-offs, which once used a similar system with its own unique twist
- NBA play-in tournament, which used a similar system since 2021
