= Super League play-offs =

- Founded: 1998
- Region: England; France
- Teams: 6
- Broadcasters: Sky Sports; BBC
- 2025

Since 1998, a play-off system has been used to determine the Super League champions. The format has changed over the years, starting with a play-off involving first five, then six teams, eight, four and currently back to six. The play-off series culminates in the Super League Grand Final. Use of a play-off system to decide the Championship brought back a rugby league tradition that had previously fallen out of use. The Super League Premiership, which had previously taken place between the highest placed teams in the competition, was discontinued after the introduction of the Super League play-off series. This was because its purpose had been to take the place of the previous Championship-deciding play-off system.

== Current play-off system ==
=== 2021–present ===
- Week 1: Elimination play-offs
  - Elimination Semi-final A: 3rd vs 6th
  - Elimination Semi-final B: 4th vs 5th
- Week 2: Semi-finals
  - Semi-finals
  - 1st vs lowest ranked winner from Eliminators
  - 2nd vs highest ranked winner from Eliminators
- Week 3: Grand final
  - Grand final: winners of semi-final 1 vs winners of semi-final 2

Elimination play-offs
3
6
4
5

Semi-finals
1
2

Grand final

This system is different from the 2020 season and was supposed to be used in the proposed format for the Championship Series of Indonesia's Liga 1 2024–25.

== Previous play-off systems ==
=== 1998–2001, 2019: top five ===
The top-five play-off system was previously used between 1998 and 2005 and again in 2019. The same system was used in the NSWRL's Sydney Competition 1973–1994, the Australian Super League in its only season 1997, the VFL 1972–1990 and New Zealand's Lion Red Cup 1994–1996, and Bartercard Cup 2000–2006.

From week two on the top-five play-offs system reflected exactly the Page playoff system.

The top-five Super League play-off structure

Week one

- Qualification Final: 2nd vs 3rd
- Elimination Final: 4th vs 5th
- Bye: 1st

Week two

- Major Semi-final: 1st vs winners of qualification final
- Minor Semi-final: losers of qualification final vs winners of elimination final

Week three

- Preliminary Final: losers of major semi-final vs winners of minor semi-final
- Bye: Winners of major semi-final

Week four

- Grand final: winners of major semi-final vs winners of preliminary final

Super League 5 team play-off bracket

Qualifying and elimination finals
2
3
4
5

Semi-finals
1

Preliminary final

Super League Grand Final

=== 2002–2008: top six ===
From Super League VII in 2002 until Super League XIII in 2008, a play-off series involving the top six teams was used to determine the winners the Super League champions. Excluding the Grand Final, all matches were staged at the home ground of the team that finished higher in the final league table.

A similar system was used by the Australian National Soccer League and the A-League to decide its champions. From Week Two onwards, the top-six play-offs system reflects exactly the Page playoff system.

The top-six Super League play-off structure

Week one

- Elimination semi-final A: 3rd vs 6th
- Elimination semi-final B: 4th vs 5th

Week two

- Qualification match: 1st vs 2nd
- Elimination final: winners of elimination semi-final A vs winners of elimination semi-final B

Week three

- Final qualifier: losers of qualification match vs winners of elimination final

Week four

- Grand final: winners of qualification match vs winners of final qualifier

Super League 6 team play-off bracket

Elimination play-offs
3
6
4
5

Qualifying/Elimination semifinal
1
2

Elimination final

Grand Final

=== 2009–2014: top eight ===
For the Super League XIV season in 2009, a top-eight play-off system was introduced to replace the previous top-six system. This change coincided with an expansion of the competition from twelve to fourteen teams following the introduction of Super League licensing. The format was introduced following consultation and discussion with all 14 member clubs in Super League. The series lasted four weeks, culminating in the Grand Final at Old Trafford during October.

The top-eight Super League play-off structure
- Week 1

Four matches took place on Week One, effectively in two pools: the Qualifying Play-Offs and the Elimination Play-Offs.
- Qualifying Play-offs

These matches involved the teams who finish in the top four.
They were:
- 1st v 4th
- 2nd v 3rd
The winners of these two games progressed directly to Week 3. The highest ranked winning club earned Club Call, whereby they chose their opponents in Week 3.
The losers of these two matches received another chance in Week 2 when they were at home to the winners of the Week 1 Elimination Play-Offs.

- Elimination Play-offs

These matches involved the teams who finish from fourth through eighth.
They were:
- 5th vs 8th
- 6th vs 7th
The winners of both matches progressed to Week 2; losers were eliminated.

- Week 2: Preliminary Semi-Finals

There were two matches in Week 2; the winner of each match progressed to Week 3 and the loser was eliminated.
- The first Preliminary Semi-Final featured the highest ranked Qualifying Play-Off loser (from Week 1) v the lowest ranked Elimination Play-Off Winner (also from Week 1).
- The second Preliminary Semi-Final featured the lowest ranked Qualifying Play-Off loser (from Week 1) v the highest ranked Elimination Play-Off Winner (also from Week 1).

- Week 3

Week 3 also featured two matches; the winner of each match progresses to the grand final and the loser is eliminated.
- Club call

Club call took place following the second weekend of the play-offs and was hosted by the highest ranked winning club from Week 1.
The host club selected whom they would play in Week 3, and could only select from the winners of the two preliminary semi-finals (Week 2) – they could not choose the other qualifying play-offs winner.
The highest ranked club from the qualifying play-offs (Week one) were required to choose their opponents – they could not cede the responsibility to the other Qualifying Play-offs winner.
The team with club call and the other qualifying play-off winners from week 1 were guaranteed home advantage in week 3. For example, if the teams that ended the regular season in 1st and 2nd place lost their opening play-off matches, they could still find themselves playing away to the 3rd or 4th placed teams in week 3.

- Qualifying semi-finals

- The first qualifying semi-final featured the highest ranked Qualifying play-Off winner (from Week 1) v the team selected through Club Call.
- The second qualifying semi-final featured the lowest ranked Qualifying play-Off winner (from Week 1) v the team not selected through club call.

- Week 4: Grand Final

The two winning teams from week 3 contested the grand final to determine the First Utility Super League champions.

Super League 8 team play-off bracket

Qualifying/Elimination playoffs
1
4
5
8
6
7
2
3

Preliminary semifinals

Qualifying semifinals

Super League Grand Final

Week 1. Qualifying/Elimination play-offs: Fixtures decided by regular reason finishing positions. Higher ranked teams play lower ranked teams. Higher ranked teams receive home ground advantage.
Week 2. Preliminary semi-finals: Fixtures decided by regular season finishing positions. Higher ranked teams play lower ranked teams. Higher ranked teams receive home ground advantage.
Week 3. Qualifying semi-finals: Winners of Qualifying play-offs play winners of Qualifying semi-finals. Fixtures decided by Club Call. Winners of Qualifying play-offs receive home ground advantage.

FAQs:

- Can any team have club call?

No. The highest ranked winning club from Week 1 will have club call, whereby they choose their opponents in week 3. Only a team that ended the regular season in 1st, 2nd or 3rd can win club call.

- Will the teams who finished 1st or 2nd at the end of the regular season be guaranteed home advantage in Week 3 should they progress?

No. The two highest rank teams after Week 1 (the team with club call and the other qualifying play-off winners) are guaranteed home advantage in week 3. For example, should the teams that ended the regular season in 1st and 2nd place lose their opening play-off match, they could still find themselves playing away to the 3rd or 4th placed teams in week 3.

- Does the Club Call team have to choose their opponents or can they relinquish the responsibility to the other Qualifying Play-offs winner?

The highest ranked club from the Qualifying Play-offs (Week 1) must choose their opponents – they cannot relinquish the responsibility to the other Qualifying Play-offs winner. In addition, they can only select from the winners of the two Preliminary Semi-finals (Week 2) – they cannot choose the other Qualifying Play-offs winner.

=== 2015–2018: top four ===
The top-four play-off system was the most simple since their introduction in 1998. The top four teams qualify, the League Leaders play at home to 4th, 2nd then play at home to 3rd with the winners of both semi finals advancing to the Grand Final.

Semifinals
1	1st
4	4th
2	2nd
3	3rd

Finals
Winner of semi-final 1
Winner of semi-final 2

The same system was used in the Championship Series of Indonesia's Liga 1 2023–24.

=== 2020: modified top six ===
A different version of playoffs using the top six teams was introduced.

The top-six Super League play-off structure

Week one

- Elimination Semi-final A: 3rd vs 6th
- Elimination Semi-final B: 4th vs 5th

Week two

- Semi-final 1: 1st vs winner of ESFA
- Semi-final 2: 2nd vs winner of ESFB

Week three

- Grand final: winners of semi-final 1 vs winners of semi-final 2

Elimination play-offs
3
6
4
5

Semi-finals
1
2

Grand final

== Play-off appearances ==
Only St. Helens have competed in every play-off series since 1998.

	Name	Apps	Five Team Format 1998-2001, 2019	Six Team Format 2002-2008, 2020 onward	Eight Team Format 2009-2014	Four Team Format 2015-2018
1	St. Helens	28	1998, **1999**, **2000**, 2001, **2019**	**2002**, 2003, 2004, 2005, **2006**, 2007, 2008, **2020**, **2021**, **2022**, 2023, 2024, 2025	2009, 2010, 2011, 2012, 2013, **2014**	2015, 2016, 2017, 2018
2	Leeds Rhinos	23	1998, 1999, 2000, 2001	2002, 2003, **2004**, 2005, 2006, **2007**, **2008**, 2020, 2021, 2022, 2025	**2009**, 2010, **2011**, **2012**, 2013, 2014	**2015**, **2017**
2	Wigan Warriors	25	**1998**, 1999, 2000, 2001, 2019	2002, 2003, 2004, 2007, 2008, 2020, 2021, 2022, **2023**, **2024**, 2025	2009, **2010**, 2011, 2012, **2013**, 2014	2015, **2016**, **2018**
4	Warrington Wolves	16	2019	2003, 2005, 2006, 2008, 2020, 2021, 2023, 2024	2010, 2011, 2012, 2013, 2014	2016, 2018
5	Hull F.C.	13	2001	2002, 2003, 2004, 2005, 2006, 2007, 2020	2010, 2011, 2012	2016, 2017
6	Bradford Bulls	11	1998, 1999, 2000, **2001**	2002, **2003**, 2004, **2005**, 2006, 2007, 2008		
7	Catalans Dragons	10		2008, 2020, 2021, 2022, 2023	2009, 2011, 2012, 2013, 2014	
8	Huddersfield Giants	9		2007, 2022	2009, 2010, 2011, 2012, 2013, 2014	2015
9	Hull Kingston Rovers	8		2021, 2023, 2024, **2025**	2009, 2010, 2011, 2013	
10	Castleford Tigers	8	1999, 2000, 2019	2002	2009, 2014	2017, 2018
11	Salford Red Devils	4	2019	2006, 2022, 2024		
11	Wakefield Trinity	4		2004, 2025	2009, 2012	
13	London Broncos	2		2003, 2005		
13	Leigh Leopards	2		2023, 2024, 2025		
15	Halifax	1	1998			
15	Crusaders	1			2010	
15	Widnes Vikings	1			2014	

Bold – won the grand final

== Play-off results ==
	Name	Best Result	Apps	Years
1	St. Helens	Champions	9	1999, 2000, 2002, 2006, 2014, 2019, 2020, 2021, 2022
2	Leeds Rhinos	Champions	8	2004, 2007, 2008, 2009, 2011, 2012, 2015, 2017
3	Wigan Warriors	Champions	7	1998, 2010, 2013, 2016, 2018, 2023, 2024
4	Bradford Bulls	Champions	3	2001, 2003, 2005
5	Hull Kingston Rovers	Champions	1	2025
6	Warrington Wolves	Grand Finalist	4	2012, 2013, 2016, 2018
7	Catalans Dragons	Grand Finalist	2	2021, 2023
8	Hull F.C.	Grand Finalist	1	2006
8	Castleford Tigers	Grand Finalist	1	2017
8	Salford Red Devils	Grand Finalist	1	2019
9	Huddersfield Giants	Semi-final	2	2010, 2015
10	Leigh Leopards	Semi-final	1	2025
11	Wakefield Trinity	Semi-Final Eliminator	2	2004, 2025
12	Halifax	Semi-Final Eliminator	1	1998
13	London Broncos	Elimination Play-off	2	2003, 2005
14	Crusaders	Elimination Play-off	1	2010
14	Widnes Vikings	Elimination Play-off	1	2014

== See also ==
- NRL finals system
- AFL final eight system
- McIntyre system
- McIntyre final eight system
