= Top-five play-offs =

Play-off structure used in rugby league

A play-off structure involving the top five teams is used to determine the winners of the Super League competition in British rugby league. Apart from the grand final, all matches are staged at the home ground of the team placed higher in the final league table.

The same system was used in the NSWRL's Sydney Competition 1973–1994, the Super League in its only season 1997, the VFL, 1972–1990 and New Zealand's Lion Red Cup, 1994–1996, and Bartercard Cup, 2000–2006.

From week two on the top-five play-offs system reflects exactly the Page playoff system.

== Procedure ==
Week one

- Qualification final: 2nd vs 3rd
- Elimination final: 4th vs 5th
- Bye: 1st

Week two

- Major semi-final: 1st vs winners of qualification final
- Minor semi-final: losers of qualification final vs winners of elimination final

Week three

- Preliminary final: losers of major semi-final vs winners of minor semi-final
- Bye: winners of major semi-final

Week four

- Grand final: winners of major semi-final vs winners of preliminary final

This is considered a good playoff system, as while it allows fifth place to take part, it is incredibly difficult for fourth and them to be crowned champions as they must beat every other team at some point.

The only NSWRL team to win the premiership from 5th was Brisbane in 1993.

In elite Australian Rules Football, only twice have the premiers won from fifth – Norwood in 1984 and North Adelaide in 2018. No AFL/VFL team won from fifth under this format (1972–1990), and no WAFL team has won under this format as of 2021.

If all matches have the same odds to win, then seed 1 has 37.5% to be champion; seed 2 and 3 have 25% to be champion; seed 4 and 5 have 6.25%;

Seed 1 has two chances to reach the final and only needs to win one match to clinch it. It is only eliminated before the final if it loses against both finalists and does not win any match.

Seed 2 and 3 need to win two out of three matches to reach the final (they are like in a best-of-three semi-final, but with different opponents in any round).

Seed 4 and 5 need to win all other four opponents without loss to be crowned. Any loss means its elimination.

== Example ==
The 1994 NSWRL finals occurred as follows:

Qualifying final
2	North Sydney	12
3	Canberra	26
4	Manly	4
5	Brisbane	16

Major Semi-final
1	Canterbury	19
Canberra	18
Minor Semi-final
North Sydney	15
Brisbane	14

Preliminary final
Canberra	22
North Sydney	9

Grand Final
1	Canterbury	12
3	Canberra	36

== See also ==
- McIntyre system
- Page playoff system
- ARL final series
