= AFL finals systems =

Playoff system used by the Australian Football League

The AFL finals systems are the premiership playoff tournaments developed and used by the Australian Football League since the 2000 season. There have been two systems: the AFL final eight system, used by the league between 2000 and 2025; and the AFL final ten system, to be used from 2026 onwards. In both systems, the teams are ranked or seeded in advance of the tournament, and the higher ranked teams have an easier path to the premiership, including double chances and the opportunity to receive byes. The tournament culminates in a grand final between the last two remaining teams, with the winning team awarded the premiership.

The AFL introduced the final eight system in 2000 to address several perceived issues with the McIntyre final eight system that had been in use in that competition from 1994 to 1999; and introduced the final ten system in 2026 to increase interest and meaningful matches deeper into the home-and-away season. The systems have also been adopted by the Victorian Football League, which was the first to adopt the final ten system, doing so in 2023; and National Rugby League, which adopted the final eight in 2012. Similar systems are used by Super League, the Rocket League Championship Series, The Icon League and the Canadian Football League (from 2027), and were previously used by the Australian Rugby League in the 1995 and 1996 seasons.

== Summary ==
=== Final eight system ===
Qualifying and elimination finals
1st Qualifying Final
1	1st	Home
4	4th	Away
1st Elimination Final
5	5th	Home
8	8th	Away
2nd Elimination Final
6	6th	Home
7	7th	Away
2nd Qualifying Final
2	2nd	Home
3	3rd	Away

Semi-finals
1st Semi Final
Loser of QF1	Home
Winner of EF1	Away
2nd Semi Final
Winner of EF2	Away
Loser of QF2	Home

Preliminary finals
1st Preliminary Final
Winner of QF1	Home
Winner of SF2	Away
2nd Preliminary Final
Winner of SF1	Away
Winner of QF2	Home

Grand final
Grand Final
Winner of PF1
Winner of PF2

The final eight system is played over four weeks:

Week one

- 1st qualifying final: 1st ranked team hosts 4th ranked team.
- 2nd qualifying final: 2nd ranked team hosts 3rd ranked team.
- 1st elimination final: 5th ranked team hosts 8th ranked team.
- 2nd elimination final: 6th ranked team hosts 7th ranked team.

The eight finalists are split into two groups for the opening week of the Finals Series. The top four teams have the best chance of winning the premiership and play the two Qualifying Finals. The winners get a bye through to Week Three of the tournament to play home Preliminary Finals, while the losers play home Semi-Finals in Week Two. The bottom four teams play the two Elimination Finals, where the winners advance to Week Two away games and the losers' seasons are over.

Week two

- 1st semi-final: Loser of 1st QF hosts winner of 1st EF
- 2nd semi-final: Loser of 2nd QF hosts winner of 2nd EF

Week three

- 1st preliminary final: Winner of 1st QF hosts winner of 2nd SF
- 2nd preliminary final: Winner of 2nd QF hosts winner of 1st SF

Week four

- Grand final: Winner of 1st PF meets Winner of 2nd PF.

=== Final ten system ===
Wildcard finals
1st Wildcard Final
7	7th	Home
10	10th	Away
2nd Wildcard Final
8	8th	Home
9	9th	Away

Qualifying and elimination finals
1st Qualifying Final
1	1st	Home
4	4th	Away
1st Elimination Final
5	5th	Home
Lower wildcard winner	Away
2nd Elimination Final
6	6th	Home
Higher wildcard winner	Away
2nd Qualifying Final
2	2nd	Home
3	3rd	Away

Semi-finals
1st Semi Final
Loser of QF1	Home
Winner of EF1	Away
2nd Semi Final
Winner of EF2	Away
Loser of QF2	Home

Preliminary finals
1st Preliminary Final
Winner of QF1	Home
Winner of SF2	Away
2nd Preliminary Final
Winner of SF1	Away
Winner of QF2	Home

Grand final
Grand Final
Winner of PF1
Winner of PF2

The final ten system plays over five weeks, using mostly the same bracket:

Week one

- 1st wildcard final: 7th ranked team hosts 10th ranked team
- 2nd wildcard final: 8th ranked team hosts 9th ranked team
- Teams ranked 1st to 6th all have a bye to the second week

Week two

- 1st qualifying final: 1st ranked team hosts 4th ranked team.
- 2nd qualifying final: 2nd ranked team hosts 3rd ranked team.
- 1st elimination final: 5th ranked team hosts lower ranked WC winner.
- 2nd elimination final: 6th ranked team hosts higher ranked WC winner

Weeks three through five

Weeks three through five follow the same bracket as weeks two through four of the final eight system.

== Advantages for ladder positions ==
=== Final eight system ===
Under the final eight system, the final eight teams are broken up into two halves of four teams which are in turn split into two pairs each. The higher a team's position on the ladder, the greater benefits they receive. The top half of the ladder has two key advantages. These teams only need to win twice to reach the grand final (either a qualifying or semi-final and a preliminary final), and they have the benefit of the double-chance; since the qualifying final is non-elimination, losers still have a second chance to reach the grand final by winning their two other finals. Teams in the top six get the benefit of at least one home final; the top two teams play two home finals.

Advantages by ladder position in final eight system
	#1	#2	#3	#4	#5	#6	#7	#8
1st opponent (ladder position)	3 lower (#4)	1 lower (#3)	1 higher (#2)	3 higher (#1)	3 lower (#8)	1 lower (#7)	1 higher (#6)	3 higher (#5)
Home matches	2 (their 1st two)		1 (their 2nd one)		1 (their 1st one)		none (visit all)	
To reach grand final ...	... must win 2 matches				... must win 3 matches			
Double-chance: If win week 1 ... If lose week 1 ...	Have double-chance:... earn bye in week 2... play semi-final in week 2				No double-chance:... play semi-final in week 2... eliminated			

First and second

The top two seeds host their first two finals: the qualifying final and whatever final they play next (Preliminary Final if they win, Semi-Final if they lose). They also have the benefit of only needing to win twice to reach the grand final. If they win the qualifying final, they earn the bye to the Preliminary Final; otherwise they get the double-chance and can still reach the Preliminary Final by winning the Semifinal.

Third and fourth

The next two seeds visit for the qualifying final but then host their next final. Like the top two, these teams only need to win twice to reach the grand final. Winning the qualifying final earns them the bye to the Preliminary Final; losing gives them the double-chance via the Semi-Final.

Fifth and sixth

Fifth and sixth place host their Elimination Final and visit any other finals they reach. These teams must win all three of their finals (Elimination, Semi-, and Preliminary Finals) to avoid elimination.

Seventh and eighth

The last two teams visit throughout the finals and also must win all three of their finals to avoid elimination.

=== Final ten system ===
Under the final ten system, the teams ranked 5th and 6th retain their advantages from the final eight system.

Teams ranked 7th and 8th gain a home wild card final, but must win five consecutive finals to win the premiership instead of four, while teams ranked 9th and 10th must win five consecutive away finals to win the premiership.

Advantages by ladder position in final ten system
	#1	#2	#3	#4	#5	#6	#7	#8	#9	#10
First opponent (ladder position)	3 lower (#4)	1 lower (#3)	1 higher (#2)	3 higher (#1)	3–5 lower (#8/9/10)	1–3 lower (#7/8/9)	3 lower (#10)	1 lower (#9)	1 higher (#8)	3 higher (#7)
Home matches	2 (their 1st two)		1 (their 2nd one)		1 (their 1st one)				none (visit all)	
Number of byes by week	1 or 2 (week 1, plus week 3 if win in week 2)				1 (in week 1 only)		none (in any week)			
To reach grand final ...	... must win 2 matches				... must win 3 matches		... must win 4 matches			
Double-chance?	yes (can lose 1st match)				no (cannot lose any matches)					

== See also ==
- Argus finals system
- McIntyre system
- Top five play-offs
- Super League play-offs
