= List of AFL debuts in 2006 =

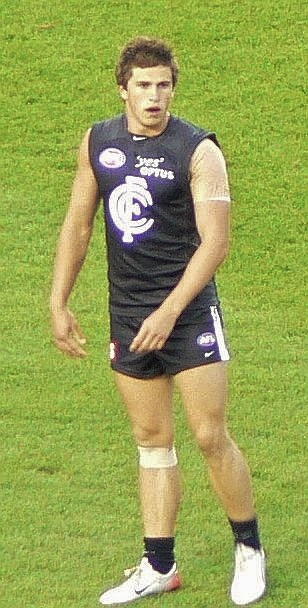
Marc Murphy made his AFL debut for Carlton in 2006.

This is a listing of Australian rules footballers to have made their debut with a club for the Australian Football League season 2006.

== Debuts ==
Name	Club	Age at debut	Round debuted	Games (to end of 2016)	Goals (to end of 2016)	Notes
Jason Porplyzia	Adelaide	21 years, 153 days	5	130	181	
Bernie Vince	Adelaide	20 years, 183 days	1	129	80	
Ivan Maric	Adelaide	20 years, 122 days	6	77	28	
Joel Patfull	Brisbane Lions	21 years, 165 days	8	182	24	
Cheynee Stiller	Brisbane Lions	19 years, 345 days	3	100	21	
Mitch Clark	Brisbane Lions	18 years, 164 days	1	82	61	
Jason Roe	Brisbane Lions	22 years, 55 days	6	50	7	
Scott Harding	Brisbane Lions	19 years, 286 days	1	48	15	
Rhan Hooper	Brisbane Lions	18 years, 89 days	2	48	49	
Colm Begley	Brisbane Lions	19 years, 354 days	20	29	7	
Ben Fixter	Brisbane Lions	24 years, 282 days	1	27	3	Previously played for Sydney.
Wayde Mills	Brisbane Lions	18 years, 222 days	2	16	3	
Martin Pask	Brisbane Lions	21 years, 159 days	11	8	4	
Marc Murphy	Carlton	18 years, 257 days	1	214	157	Son of John Murphy.
Paul Bower	Carlton	18 years, 230 days	21	45	2	
Luke Blackwell	Carlton	19 years, 193 days	8	23	4	Son of Wayne Blackwell.
Josh Kennedy	Carlton	18 years, 255 days	6	22	11	
Jason Saddington	Carlton	26 years, 174 days	7	20	6	Previously played for Sydney.
Dylan McLaren	Carlton	23 years, 329 days	1	13	4	Previously played for Brisbane.
Ryan Jackson	Carlton	19 years, 152 days	22	9	3	
Jesse D. Smith	Carlton	20 years, 281 days	20	2	0	
Scott Pendlebury	Collingwood	18 years, 147 days	10	236	152	
Dale Thomas	Collingwood	18 years, 286 days	1	157	121	
Sam Iles	Collingwood	19 years, 47 days	18	7	0	
Patrick Ryder	Essendon	18 years, 18 days	1	170	117	
Courtenay Dempsey	Essendon	18 years, 259 days	7	133	35	
Sam Lonergan	Essendon	19 years, 111 days	15	79	39	
Scott Camporeale	Essendon	30 years, 233 days	1	19	5	Previously played for Carlton.
Richard Cole	Essendon	23 years, 14 days	17	7	0	Previously played for Collingwood.
Andrew Lee	Essendon	19 years, 364 days	13	5	2	
Ben Jolley	Essendon	20 years, 153 days	15	4	0	
Paul Duffield	Fremantle	21 years, 84 days	5	171	33	
Marcus Drum	Fremantle	19 years, 61 days	13	22	6	Son of Damian Drum.
Adam Campbell	Fremantle	21 years, 129 days	10	13	13	
Michael Warren	Fremantle	24 years, 54 days	7	1	0	
Mathew Stokes	Geelong	21 years, 186 days	9	189	203	
Brent Prismall	Geelong	19 years, 289 days	5	25	15	
Ryan Gamble	Geelong	18 years, 345 days	22	24	31	
Matthew Spencer	Geelong	21 years, 143 days	11	2	0	
Grant Birchall	Hawthorn	18 years, 64 days	1	240	33	
Brent Guerra	Hawthorn	23 years, 308 days	1	159	25	Previously played for Port Adelaide and St Kilda.
Ben McGlynn	Hawthorn	20 years, 301 days	10	44	28	
Max Bailey	Hawthorn	19 years, 287 days	18	43	10	
Beau Dowler	Hawthorn	18 years, 233 days	18	16	11	
Andrew Swallow	Kangaroos	18 years, 352 days	8	208	76	
Josh Gibson	Kangaroos	22 years, 19 days	1	65	2	
Kasey Green	Kangaroos	26 years, 203 days	1	39	15	Previously played for West Coast.
Ed Lower	Kangaroos	19 years, 28 days	16	34	15	Brother of Nick Lower.
Ben Schwarze	Kangaroos	22 years, 263 days	7	11	2	Brother of Troy Schwarze.
Jonathan Hay	Kangaroos	26 years, 231 days	1	8	0	Previously played for Hawthorn.
Joel Perry	Kangaroos	20 years, 294 days	2	8	0	
Cameron Thurley	Kangaroos	24 years, 126 days	1	5	0	Previously played for Geelong.
Daniel McConnell	Kangaroos	20 years, 52 days	19	4	0	Previously played for West Coast.
Jade Rawlings	Kangaroos	28 years, 238 days	10	3	2	Previously played for Hawthorn and the Western Bulldogs. Brother of Brady Rawlings.
Brad Moran	Kangaroos	19 years, 331 days	21	3	0	
Nathan Jones	Melbourne	18 years, 191 days	17	223	105	
Lynden Dunn	Melbourne	18 years, 356 days	6	165	97	
Clint Bartram	Melbourne	18 years, 45 days	1	103	17	
Matthew Bate	Melbourne	18 years, 340 days	5	102	98	
Matthew Warnock	Melbourne	22 years, 13 days	3	51	1	
Byron Pickett	Melbourne	28 years, 234 days	1	29	16	Previously played for Kangaroos and Port Adelaide.
Alipate Carlile	Port Adelaide	19 years, 84 days	16	167	5	
Tom Logan	Port Adelaide	21 years, 14 days	15	114	27	Previously played for Brisbane.
Daniel Motlop	Port Adelaide	24 years, 16 days	1	83	155	Previously played for Kangaroos. Brother of Shannon Motlop.
Nathan Lonie	Port Adelaide	23 years, 36 days	2	40	16	Previously played for Hawthorn. Brother of Ryan Lonie.
Matt Thomas	Port Adelaide	19 years, 131 days	14	29	7	
Greg Bentley	Port Adelaide	19 years, 125 days	19	21	6	
Nick Lower	Port Adelaide	19 years, 50 days	19	20	0	Brother of Ed Lower.
Fabian Deluca	Port Adelaide	19 years, 93 days	8	11	1	Brother of Adrian Deluca.
James Ezard	Port Adelaide	20 years, 58 days	8	4	1	
Ryan Willits	Port Adelaide	19 years, 207 days	20	3	1	
Elijah Ware	Port Adelaide	23 years, 64 days	8	2	1	
Luke McGuane	Richmond	19 years, 90 days	7	105	39	
Matthew White	Richmond	19 years, 49 days	10	105	54	
Dean Polo	Richmond	19 years, 274 days	6	56	11	
Patrick Bowden	Richmond	24 years, 239 days	1	25	15	Previously played for Western Bulldogs. Son of Michael Bowden. Brother of Sean and Joel Bowden.
Cameron Howat	Richmond	21 years, 187 days	18	21	10	
Cleve Hughes	Richmond	19 years, 103 days	5	16	23	
Jarrad Oakley-Nicholls	Richmond	18 years, 86 days	6	13	1	
Jeremy Humm	Richmond	23 years, 100 days	3	1	0	Previously played for West Coast.
Sam Gilbert	St Kilda	19 years, 275 days	8	179	36	
Michael Rix	St Kilda	25 years, 153 days	11	29	3	
Fergus Watts	St Kilda	20 years, 190 days	1	1	1	Previously played for Adelaide.
Ted Richards	Sydney	23 years, 80 days	1	228	15	Previously played for Essendon.
Heath Grundy	Sydney	20 years, 50 days	16	70	18	
Tim Schmidt	Sydney	20 years, 137 days	17	17	12	
Paul Chambers	Sydney	23 years, 282 days	1	12	0	Previously played for Geelong.
Simon Phillips	Sydney	19 years, 101 days	15	5	2	
Matt Priddis	West Coast	21 years, 74 days	10	219	67	
Shannon Hurn	West Coast	18 years, 237 days	5	200	49	
Steven Armstrong	West Coast	22 years, 171 days	13	36	27	Previously played for Melbourne.
Shaun Higgins	Western Bulldogs	18 years, 83 days	9	129	128	
Damien McCormack	Western Bulldogs	19 years, 169 days	15	4	0	
Travis Baird	Western Bulldogs	19 years, 363 days	16	3	4	Previously played for Brisbane.
