= 2005 AFL draft =

Draft for the Australian Football League

General information
- Date: 24 November 2005
- Location: Telstra Dome, Melbourne
- Network: Fox Sports
- Sponsored by: National Australia Bank

Overview
- League: AFL
- First selection: Marc Murphy (Carlton)

The 2005 AFL draft was the 2005 event of the AFL draft, the annual draft of players by Australian rules football teams that participate in the main competition of that sport, the Australian Football League. The 2005 draft consisted of a pre-season draft, a national draft, a trade period and a rookie elevation.

In 2005, there were 76 picks to be drafted amongst 16 teams in the national draft. The Carlton Blues received the first pick in the national draft after finishing on the bottom of the ladder during the 2005 AFL season. This was their first ever priority draft pick after the drama of 2002 when they lost draft picks for breaching the salary cap.

In addition to the national draft, the 2005/06 off-season featured trade week (prior to the national draft) and pre-season and rookie drafts (following the national draft).

== Key dates ==
Table of key dates
Event	Date(s)
Trade period	3–7 October
National draft	24 November
Pre-season draft	13 December
Rookie draft	13 December

== Trades ==
Player name	Original club	New club	Traded for
Fergus Watts	Adelaide	St Kilda	draft pick #17
Richard Cole	Collingwood	Essendon	draft pick #23
Ted Richards	Essendon	Sydney Swans	draft picks #19 & #50
Jonathan Hay	Hawthorn	Kangaroos	draft pick #18
Nathan Lonie	Hawthorn	Port Adelaide	draft pick #14
Daniel Motlop	Kangaroos	Port Adelaide	draft picks #28 & #46
Byron Pickett and picks #54 & #62	Port Adelaide	Melbourne	draft picks #28, #44 & #60
Jason Saddington	Sydney Swans	Carlton	draft pick #52
Mark Powell	Sydney Swans	Kangaroos	draft pick #61
Daniel McConnell and pick #18	West Coast Eagles	Kangaroos	draft picks #13 & #29
Jade Rawlings and pick #43	Western Bulldogs	Kangaroos	draft picks #46
Patrick Bowden	Western Bulldogs	Richmond	draft pick #56

== 2005 national draft ==
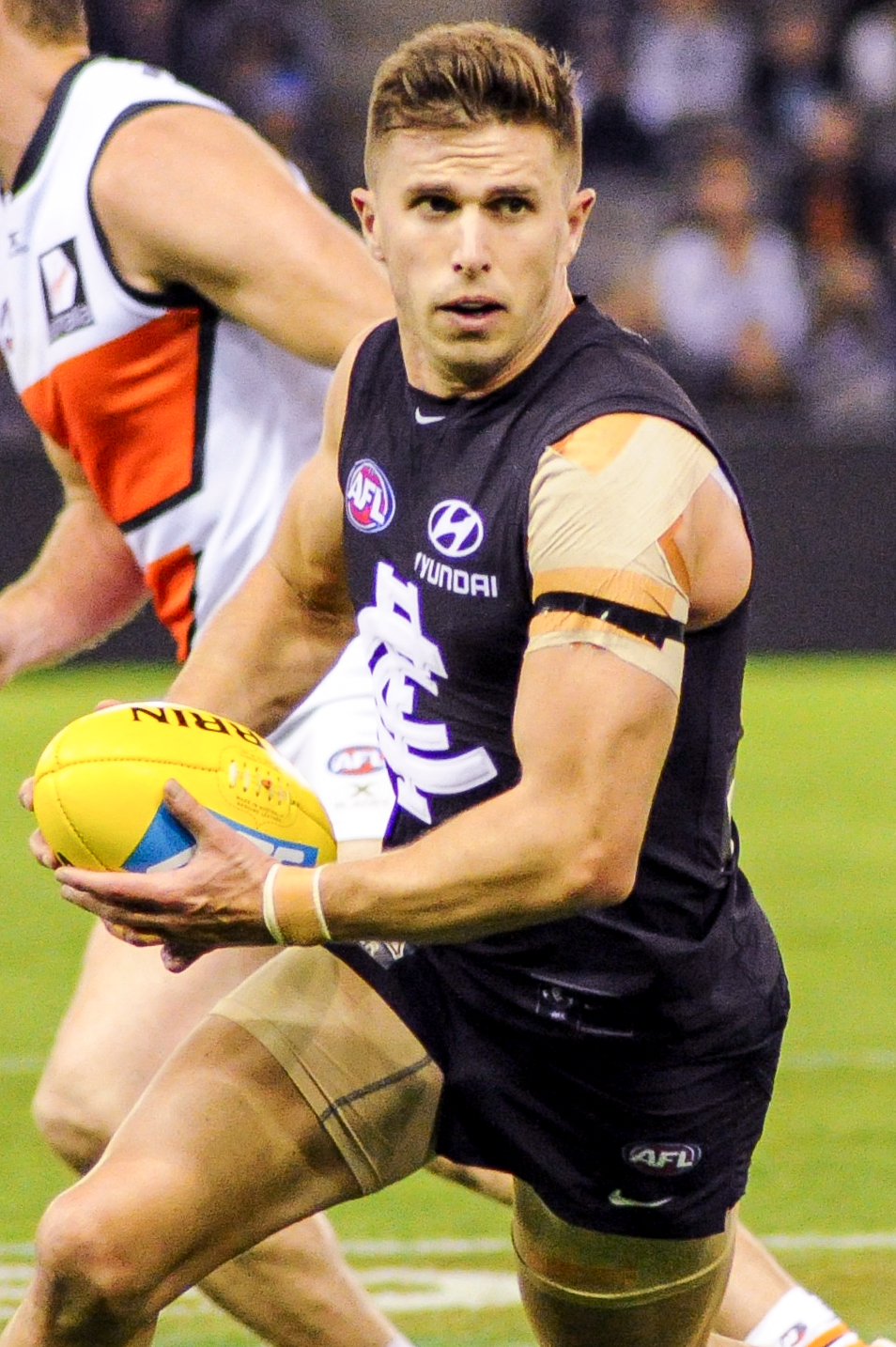
Marc Murphy, pick 1

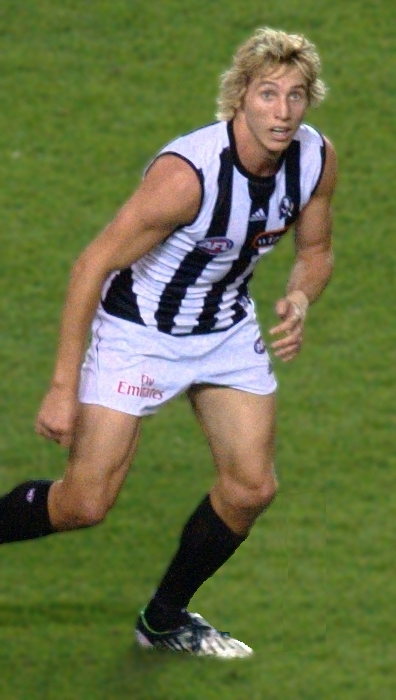
Dale Thomas, pick 2

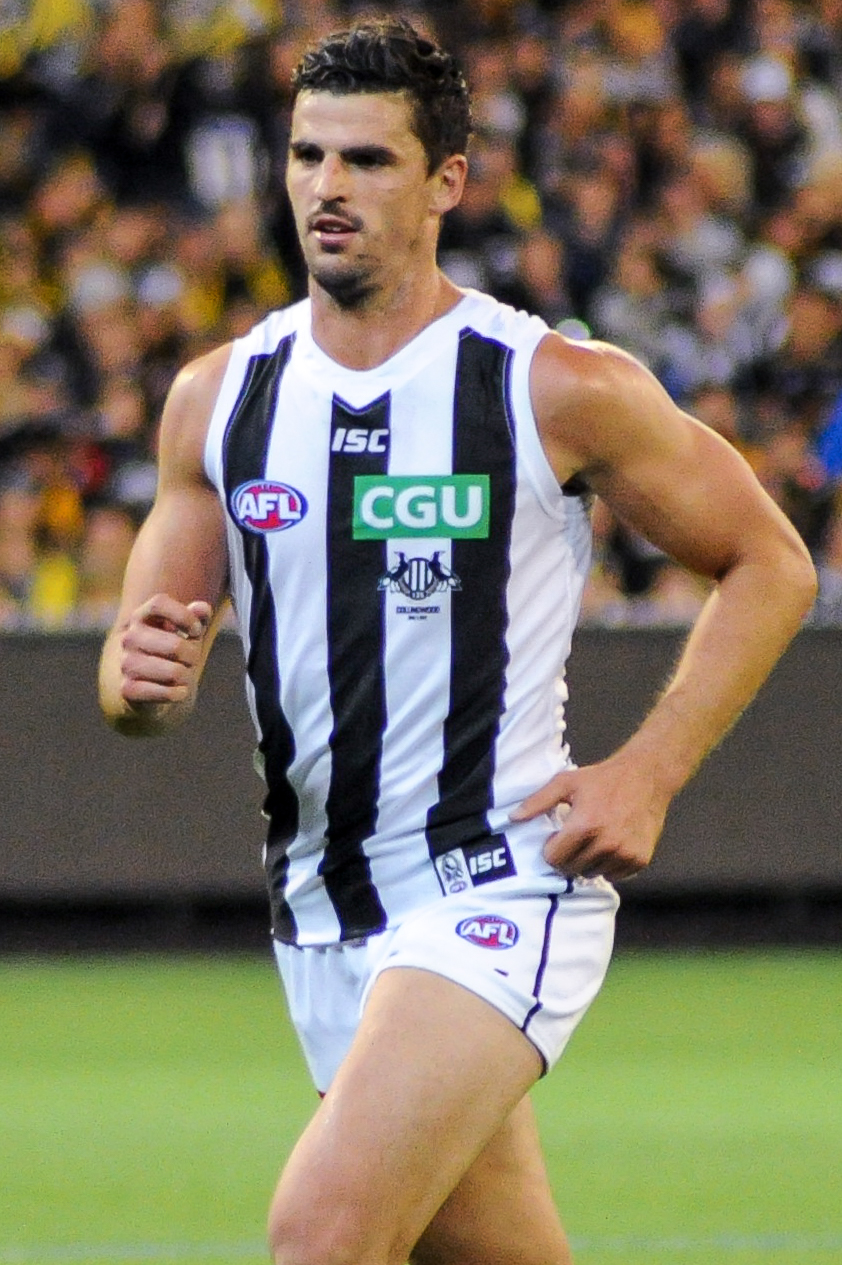
Scott Pendlebury, pick 5

*	Denotes player who has been a premiership player and been selected for at least one All-Australian team
^{+}	Denotes player who has been a premiership player at least once
^{x}	Denotes player who has been selected for at least one All-Australian team
^{~}	Denotes player who has been selected as Rising Star

Round	Pick	Player	Recruited from	Club
Priority	1	Marc Murphy	Oakleigh Chargers	Carlton
Priority	2	Dale Thomas	Gippsland Power	Collingwood
Priority	3	Xavier Ellis	Gippsland Power	Hawthorn
1	4	Josh Kennedy	East Fremantle	Carlton
1	5	Scott Pendlebury	Gippsland Power	Collingwood
1	6	Beau Dowler	Oakleigh Chargers	Hawthorn
1	7	Paddy Ryder	East Fremantle	Essendon
1	8	Jarrad Oakley-Nicholls	East Perth	Richmond
1	9	Mitch Clark	East Fremantle	Brisbane Lions
1	10	Marcus Drum	Murray Bushrangers	Fremantle
1	11	Shaun Higgins	Geelong Falcons	Western Bulldogs
1	12	Nathan Jones	Dandenong Stingrays	Melbourne
1	13	Shannon Hurn	Central District	West Coast
1	14	Grant Birchall	Tassie Mariners	Hawthorn
1	15	Travis Varcoe	Central District	Geelong
1	16	Richard Douglas	Calder Cannons	Adelaide
1	17	Darren Pfeiffer	Norwood	Adelaide
1	18	Max Bailey	West Perth	Hawthorn
1	19	Courtenay Dempsey	Morningside	Essendon
2	20	Paul Bower	Peel Thunder	Carlton
2	21	Danny Stanley	Geelong Falcons	Collingwood
2	22	Beau Muston	Murray Bushrangers	Hawthorn
2	23	Ryan Cook	Dandenong Stingrays	Collingwood
2	24	Cleve Hughes	Norwood	Richmond
2	25	Wayde Mills	Southport	Brisbane Lions
2	26	Garrick Ibbotson	East Fremantle	Fremantle
2	27	Dylan Addison	St George	Western Bulldogs
2	28	Matt Riggio	Peel Thunder	Kangaroos
2	29	Ben McKinley	Northern Knights	West Coast
2	30	Nick Lower	Norwood	Port Adelaide
2	31	Trent West	Gippsland Power	Geelong
2	32	Bernie Vince	Woodville-West Torrens	Adelaide
2	33	Samuel Gilbert	Southport	St Kilda
2	34	Matthew Spangher	Eastern Ranges	West Coast
2	35	Stephen Owen	North Ballarat Rebels	Geelong
3	36	Jake Edwards	Western Jets	Carlton
3	37	Jack Anthony	Northern Knights	Collingwood
3 (F/S)	38	Travis Tuck	Dandenong Stingrays	Hawthorn
3 (F/S)	39	Jay Neagle	Gippsland Power	Essendon
3	40	Travis Casserly	Swan Districts	Richmond
3	41	Rhan Hooper	Mt Gravatt	Brisbane Lions
3	42	Robert Warnock	Sandringham Dragons	Fremantle
3	43	Andrew Swallow	East Fremantle	Kangaroos
3	44	Alipate Carlile	Murray Bushrangers	Port Adelaide
3	45	Kasey Green	West Coast	Kangaroos
3	46	Travis Baird	Brisbane Lions	Western Bulldogs
3	47	Ryan Gamble	Glenelg	Geelong
3	48	Alan Obst	Central District	Adelaide
3	49	Michael Rix	Coburg	St Kilda
3	50	Sam Lonergan	Tassie Mariners	Essendon
4	51	Matthew Laidlaw	Oakleigh Chargers	Sydney
4	52	Pass		Collingwood
4	53	Simon Buckley	Sandringham Dragons	Melbourne
4	54	Kristin Thornton	Peel Thunder	Sydney
4	55	Brett Montgomery	Port Adelaide	Western Bulldogs
4	56	Joel Patfull	Port Adelaide	Brisbane Lions
4	57	Michael West	Tassie Mariners	Western Bulldogs
4	58	Hugh Minson	Norwood	Port Adelaide
4	59	Ryan Brabazon	Claremont	Sydney
4	60	Clint Bartram	Geelong Falcons	Melbourne
4	61	Mathew Stokes	Woodville-West Torrens	Geelong
4	62	Pass		Adelaide
4	63	Phillip Raymond	Glenelg	St Kilda
5	64	Pass		Carlton
5	65	Pass		Hawthorn
5	66	Austin Lucy	Suncoast Lions	Essendon
5	67	Pass		Richmond
5	68	Heath Neville	Tassie Mariners	Melbourne
5	69	Tim Hutchison	Port Adelaide Magpies	Kangaroos
5	70	Jonathan Giles	Central District	Port Adelaide
5	71	Justin Sweeney	Tyabb	St Kilda
6	72	Pass		Essendon
6	73	Pass		Kangaroos
6	74	Pass		Port Adelaide
6	75	Pass		St Kilda
6	76	Pass		Essendon

== 2006 pre-season draft ==
The 2006 pre-season draft was held on 13 December 2005. For the pre-season draft held in 2004, known as the 2005 pre-season draft, see 2004 AFL draft.

Pick	Player	Recruited from	Club
1	Dylan McLaren	Brisbane Lions	Carlton
2	Sam Iles	Tassie Mariners	Collingwood
3	Brent Guerra	St Kilda	Hawthorn
4	Scott Camporeale	Carlton	Essendon
5	Matthew White	Calder Cannons	Richmond
6	Ben Fixter	Sydney Swans	Brisbane Lions
7	Cameron Thurley	Geelong	Kangaroos
8	Matt Thomas	Sandringham Dragons	Port Adelaide
9	Jason Porplyzia	West Adelaide	Adelaide
10	Chris Heffernan	Melbourne	Essendon

== 2006 rookie draft ==
Round	Pick	Player	Recruited from	Club
1	1	Ryan Jackson	Northern Knights	Carlton
1	2	Alan Toovey	Claremont	Collingwood
1	3	Luke McEntee	North Adelaide	Hawthorn
1	4	Lachlan McKinnon	Calder Cannons	Essendon
1	5	Angus Graham	Tassie Mariners	Richmond
1	6	Jason Roe	North Adelaide	Brisbane Lions
1	7	Paul Duffield	Fremantle	Fremantle
1	8	Tom Davidson	Collingwood	Western Bulldogs
1	9	Jace Bode	Sturt	Melbourne
1	10	Ed Lower	Norwood	Kangaroos
1	11	Thomas Rischbieth	Sturt	Port Adelaide
1	12	Todd Grima	Tassie Mariners	Geelong
1	13	Brad Sugars	Glenelg	Adelaide
1	14	Cathal Corr	Northern Knights	St Kilda
1	15	Steven Armstrong	Melbourne	West Coast
1	16	Jonathan Simpkin	Geelong	Sydney
2	17	Craig Flint	Gippsland Power	Carlton
2	18	Daniel Nicholls	Dandenong Stingrays	Collingwood
2	19	Lukas Markovic	Eastern Ranges	Hawthorn
2	20	Heath Hocking	East Ringwood	Essendon
2	21	Jeremy Humm	West Coast	Richmond
2	22	Leonard Clark	West Adelaide	Brisbane Lions
2	23	Toby Stribling	Fremantle	Fremantle
2	24	Pass		Western Bulldogs
2	25	Daniel Hughes	Sandringham Dragons	Melbourne
2	26	Djaran Whyman	North Ballarat	Kangaroos
2	27	Greg Bentley	Dandenong Stingrays	Port Adelaide
2	28	Will Slade	Geelong	Geelong
2	29	Tom Redden	Glenelg	Adelaide
2	30	Dylan Pfitzner	St Kilda	St Kilda
2	31	Matthew Priddis	Subiaco	West Coast
2	32	James Wall	Calder Cannons	Sydney
3	33	Shannon Cox	South Fremantle	Collingwood
3	34	Stephen Gilham	Port Adelaide	Hawthorn
3	35	Matthew Firman	Belconnen	Essendon
3	36	Cameron Howat	Oakleigh Chargers	Richmond
3	37	Luke Forsyth	Brisbane Lions	Brisbane Lions
3	38	Pass		Western Bulldogs
3	39	Shane Neaves	Calder Cannons	Melbourne
3	40	Tim Looby	Murray Bushrangers	Port Adelaide
3	41	Sam Hunt	Essendon	Geelong
3	42	Adrian Bonaddio	Oakleigh Chargers	Adelaide
3	43	Pass		St Kilda
3	44	Michael Embley	West Coast	West Coast
3	45	Paul Currie	Northern Knights	Sydney
4	46	Ben Kane	Hawthorn	Hawthorn
4	47	Tim O'Keefe	Calder Cannons	Essendon
4	48	Pass		Richmond
4	49	Cheynee Stiller	Northern Eagles	Brisbane Lions
4	50	Pass		Western Bulldogs
4	51	Andre Gianfagna	Northern Knights	Melbourne
4	52	Tom Logan	Brisbane Lions	Port Adelaide
4	53	Sam Elliott	South Adelaide	Adelaide
4	54	Simon Phillips	Sandringham Dragons	Sydney
5	55	Ben McGlynn	Box Hill Hawks	Hawthorn
5	56	Pass		Richmond
5	57	Colm Begley	Ireland	Brisbane
5	58	Kieren Jack	NSW-ACT Rams	Sydney
6	59	Brendan Quigley	Ireland	Brisbane
6	60	Ed Barlow	Oakleigh Chargers	Sydney
7	61	Adam Prior	Murray Bushrangers	Sydney
8	62	Sam Rowe	Murray Bushrangers	Sydney
