= 2006 Brisbane Lions season =

Brisbane Lions
2006 season
- Coach: Leigh Matthews
- Captain: Michael Voss
- Home ground: The Gabba (Capacity: 42,000)
- AFL season: 13th
- Best and fairest: Simon Black
- Leading goalkicker: Daniel Bradshaw (59 goals)
- Highest home attendance: 34,357 vs. Essendon (8 April 2006)
- Lowest home attendance: 23,764 vs. West Coast (20 August 2006)
- Average home attendance: 28,629
- Club membership: 26,459

The Brisbane Lions' 2006 season was its tenth season in the Australian Football League (AFL). The team is based in Brisbane, Queensland, Australia.

== 2005 off-season list changes ==
=== Ins ===
==== National draft ====
Round	Overall pick	Player	State	Position	Team from	League from	Ref
1	9	Mitch Clark	WA	Forward / Ruckman	East Fremantle	WAFL	
2	25	Wayde Mills	QLD	Full-back / Half-back	Southport	QAFL	
3	41	Rhan Hooper	QLD	Utility	Mt Gravatt	QAFL	
4	56	Joel Patfull	SA	Defender	Norwood	SANFL	

==== Pre-season draft ====
Pick	Player	State	Position	Team from	League from	Ref
6	Ben Fixter	NSW	Defender	Sydney Swans	AFL	

==== Rookie draft ====
Round	Overall pick	Player	State	Position	Team from	League from	Ref
1	6	Jason Roe	NT	Defender	North Adelaide	SANFL	
2	22	Leonard Clark	SA	Ruckman	West Adelaide	SANFL	
3	37	Luke Forsyth	VIC	Ruckman	Brisbane Lions	AFL	
4	49	Cheynee Stiller	VIC	Ruckman	Northern Eagles	QAFL	

=== Outs ===
==== Retirements and delistings ====
Date	Player	Reason	Club games	Club goals	Career goals	Career games	Ref
3 August 2005	Martin Pike	Retired	106	67	247	126	
25 August 2005	Darryl White	Retired	178	59	268	165	
31 October 2005	Dylan McLaren	Delisted	46	6	46	6	
31 October 2005	Llane Spaanderman	Delisted	3	1	3	1	
31 October 2005	Tom Logan	Delisted	3	1	3	1	
31 October 2005	Travis Baird	Delisted	2	1	2	1	
31 October 2005	Leigh Ryswyk	Delisted	1	0	1	0	
31 October 2005	Luke Forsyth	Delisted	0	0	0	0	

== Season summary ==
=== Premiership Season ===
==== Home and away season ====
Rd	Date and local time	Opponent	Scores		Venue	Attendance
Rd	Date and local time	Opponent	Brisbane	Opponent	Venue	Attendance
1	Saturday, 1 April (2:10 pm)	Geelong	38	115	Kardinia Park (A)	23,029
2	Saturday, 8 April (7:10 pm)	Essendon	115	97	The Gabba (H)	34,357
3	Thursday, 13 April (7:40 pm)	St Kilda	87	124	Docklands Stadium (A)	35,760
4	Saturday, 22 April (7:10 pm)	Richmond	82	96	The Gabba (H)	30,266
5	Saturday, 29 April (5:40 pm)	West Coast	63	122	Subiaco Oval (A)	40,519
6	Sunday, 7 May (1:10 pm)	Sydney	70	102	The Gabba (H)	29,872
7	Saturday, 13 May (7:10 pm)	Hawthorn	106	66	Carrara Stadium (A)	12,315
8	Sunday, 21 May (12:40 pm)	Port Adelaide	147	78	Football Park (A)	21,970
9	Sunday, 28 May (1:10 pm)	Fremantle	141	73	The Gabba (H)	29,999
10	Saturday, 3 June (7:10 pm)	Collingwood	83	109	MCG (A)	54,820
11	Saturday, 10 June (7:10 pm)	Adelaide	60	75	The Gabba (H)	27,516
12	Saturday, 17 June (7:10 pm)	Western Bulldogs	103	145	The Gabba (H)	27,745
13	Saturday, 1 July (7:10 pm)	Carlton	71	56	The Gabba (H)	29,516
14	Saturday, 8 July (7:10 pm)	Melbourne	90	98	The Gabba (A)	25,541
15	Saturday, 15 July (7:10 pm)	Kangaroos	85	84	Docklands Stadium (A)	22,947
16	Saturday, 22 July (7:10 pm)	Hawthorn	84	74	The Gabba (H)	26,738
17	Saturday, 29 July (7:10 pm)	Essendon	123	160	Docklands Stadium (A)	32,761
18	Sunday, 6 August (1:10 pm)	Geelong	87	104	The Gabba (H)	28,055
19	Saturday, 12 August (7:10 pm)	Richmond	60	142	Docklands Stadium (A)	27,211
20	Sunday, 20 August (1:10 pm)	West Coast	52	114	The Gabba (H)	23,764
21	Saturday, 26 August (7:10 pm)	Sydney	40	97	Stadium Australia (A)	37,659
22	Saturday, 2 September (7:10 pm)	St Kilda	57	108	The Gabba (H)	27,101

===== Round 1 =====
Round 1
Saturday, 1 April (2:10 pm)	Geelong	def.	Brisbane Lions	Skilled Stadium (crowd: 23,029)
4.3 (27); 8.7 (55); 12.9 (81); 17.13 (115)	Q1; Q2; Q3; Final	1.1 (7); 1.3 (9); 2.6 (18); 5.8 (38)	Umpires: McLaren, Chamberlain, Meredith; Television broadcast: Fox Footy Channel
Chapman 3 Bartel, Playfair, Ottens, Milburn, Gardiner 2 Ablett, Byrnes, Mackie, Slade 1	Goals	2 Bradshaw; 1 McGrath, Clark, Akermanis
Bartel, Ablett, Byrnes, Chapman, Corey, Milburn, Enright, Ling, Scarlett	Best	Bradshaw, Sherman, Akermanis, Voss, Black
Mitch Clark made his AFL debut.

===== Round 2 =====
Round 2
Saturday, 8 April (7:10 pm)	Brisbane Lions	def.	Essendon	The Gabba (crowd: 34,357)
4.5 (29); 7.9 (51); 12.13 (85); 17.13 (115)	Q1; Q2; Q3; Final	2.0 (12); 7.0 (42); 10.3 (63); 15.7 (97)	Umpires: Kennedy, Quigley, Wenn; Television broadcast: Network Ten
Rhan Hooper made his AFL debut.

===== Round 3 =====
Round 3 (Easter)
Thursday, 13 April (7:40 pm)	St Kilda	def.	Brisbane Lions	Telstra Dome (crowd: 35,760)
7.3 (45); 10.6 (66); 16.9 (105); 19.10 (124)	Q1; Q2; Q3; Final	4.2 (26); 4.7 (31); 8.11 (59); 12.15 (87)	Umpires: Vozzo, Rosebury, Ellis; Television broadcast: Nine Network
Cheynee Stiller made his AFL debut.

===== Round 4 =====
Round 4 (Anzac Day)
Saturday, 22 April (7:10 pm)	Brisbane Lions	def. by	Richmond	The Gabba (crowd: 30,266)
1.6 (12); 4.9 (33); 5.10 (40); 11.16 (82)	Q1; Q2; Q3; Final	1.4 (10); 4.8 (32); 10.11 (71); 14.12 (96)	Umpires: Donlon, Rosebury, Wenn; Television broadcast: Network Ten

===== Round 5 =====
Round 5
Saturday, 29 April (5:40 pm)	West Coast	def.	Brisbane Lions	Subiaco Oval (crowd: 40,519)
5.4 (34); 9.7 (61); 13.12 (90); 18.14 (122)	Q1; Q2; Q3; Final	4.2 (26); 7.4 (46); 8.8 (56); 9.9 (63)	Umpires: Stevic, Head, Goldspink; Television broadcast: Fox Footy Channel

===== Round 6 =====
Round 6 (Rivalry Round)
Sunday, 7 May (1:10 pm)	Brisbane Lions	def. by	Sydney	The Gabba (crowd: 29,872)
3.4 (22); 4.4 (28); 8.7 (55); 10.10 (70)	Q1; Q2; Q3; Final	5.2 (32); 8.6 (54); 13.10 (88); 15.12 (102)	Umpires: Grun, Schmitt, McInerney; Television broadcast: Nine Network
Jason Roe made his AFL debut.

===== Round 7 =====
Round 7 (Mother's Day)
Saturday, 13 May (7:10 pm)	Hawthorn	def. by	Brisbane Lions	Carrara Stadium (crowd: 12,315)
0.0 (0); 4.1 (25); 6.7 (43); 9.12 (66)	Q1; Q2; Q3; Final	4.1 (25); 9.8 (62); 14.9 (93); 16.10 (106)	Umpires: Donlon, Rosebury, Wenn; Television broadcast: Fox Footy Channel

===== Round 8 =====
Round 8
Sunday, 21 May (12:40 pm)	Port Adelaide	def. by	Brisbane Lions	AAMI Stadium (crowd: 21,970)
4.6 (30); 6.9 (45); 7.13 (55); 10.18 (78)	Q1; Q2; Q3; Final	5.3 (33); 9.8 (62); 18.11 (119); 22.15 (147)	Umpires: Meredith, Wenn, Ellis; Television broadcast: Nine Network
Joel Patfull made his AFL debut.

===== Round 9 =====
Round 9
Sunday, 28 May (1:10 pm)	Brisbane Lions	def.	Fremantle	The Gabba (crowd: 27,999)
7.3 (45); 10.11 (71); 14.13 (97); 21.15 (141)	Q1; Q2; Q3; Final	2.2 (14); 4.8 (32); 7.10 (52); 10.13 (73)	Umpires: M. Nicholls, K. Nicholls, McInerney; Television broadcast: Nine Network

===== Round 10 =====
Round 10
Saturday, 3 June (7:10 pm)	Collingwood	def.	Brisbane Lions	MCG (crowd: 54,820)
3.5 (23); 6.6 (42); 11.10 (76); 16.13 (109)	Q1; Q2; Q3; Final	2.2 (14); 5.5 (35); 8.7 (55); 12.11 (83)	Umpires: Rosebury, Allen, Jeffery; Television broadcast: Network Ten

===== Round 11 =====
Round 11 (Queen's Birthday)
Saturday, 10 June (7:10 pm)	Brisbane Lions	def. by	Adelaide	The Gabba (crowd: 27,516)
3.3 (21); 4.8 (32); 5.11 (41); 8.12 (60)	Q1; Q2; Q3; Final	0.4 (4); 3.7 (25); 7.13 (55); 10.15 (75)	Umpires: McLaren, Quigley, Head; Television broadcast: Fox Footy Channel
Marty Pask made his AFL debut.

===== Round 12 =====
Round 12 (Split Round)
Saturday, 17 June (7:10 pm)	Brisbane Lions	def. by	Western Bulldogs	The Gabba (crowd: 27,745)
4.5 (29); 7.10 (52); 12.12 (84); 14.19 (103)	Q1; Q2; Q3; Final	7.4 (46); 13.7 (85); 20.9 (129); 22.13 (145)	Umpires: Rosebury, Wenn, Jeffery; Television broadcast: Network Ten

===== Round 13 =====
Round 13
Saturday, 1 July (7:10 pm)	Brisbane Lions	def.	Carlton	The Gabba (crowd: 29,516)
1.5 (11); 4.9 (33); 6.18 (54); 8.23 (71)	Q1; Q2; Q3; Final	2.0 (12); 4.6 (30); 6.8 (44); 7.14 (56)	Umpires: Head, Avon, K. Nicholls; Television broadcast: Fox Footy Channel

===== Round 14 =====
Round 14
Saturday, 8 July (7:10 pm)	Melbourne	def.	Brisbane Lions	The Gabba (crowd: 25,541)
2.2 (14); 5.6 (36); 10.9 (69); 14.14 (98)	Q1; Q2; Q3; Final	5.2 (32); 7.5 (47); 10.10 (70); 13.12 (90)	Umpires: Kennedy, Quigley, Kamolins; Television broadcast: Network Ten

===== Round 15 =====
Round 15
Saturday, 15 July (7:10 pm)	Kangaroos	def. by	Brisbane Lions	Telstra Dome (crowd: 22,947)
4.4 (28); 7.12 (54); 8.16 (64); 11.18 (84)	Q1; Q2; Q3; Final	2.3 (15); 5.5 (35); 7.9 (51); 13.7 (85)	Umpires: Margetts, Grun, Ryan; Television broadcast: Fox Footy Channel
This was the final game at the Lions for Jason Akermanis, who would be traded to the Western Bulldogs at the end of the season.

===== Round 16 =====
Round 16 (Heritage Round)
Saturday, 22 July (7:10 pm)	Brisbane Lions	def.	Hawthorn	The Gabba (crowd: 26,738)
1.4 (10); 5.9 (39); 11.12 (78); 11.18 (84)	Q1; Q2; Q3; Final	5.3 (33); 8.3 (51); 10.6 (66); 11.8 (74)	Umpires: Davis, Head, Meredith; Television broadcast: Fox Footy Channel

===== Round 17 =====
Round 17
Saturday, 29 July (7:10 pm)	Essendon	def.	Brisbane Lions	Telstra Dome (crowd: 32,761)
5.4 (34); 10.6 (66); 17.7 (109); 25.10 (160)	Q1; Q2; Q3; Final	6.3 (39); 10.8 (68); 15.11 (101); 18.15 (123)	Umpires: Margetts, McLaren, Avon; Television broadcast: Network Ten

===== Round 18 =====
Round 18
Sunday, 6 August (1:10 pm)	Brisbane Lions	def. by	Geelong	The Gabba (crowd: 28,055)
4.0 (24); 8.1 (49); 11.5 (71); 13.9 (87)	Q1; Q2; Q3; Final	4.5 (29); 9.11 (65); 12.17 (89); 14.20 (104)	Umpires: Donlon, Grun, McInerney; Television broadcast: Nine Network

===== Round 19 =====
Round 19
Saturday, 12 August (7:10 pm)	Richmond	def.	Brisbane Lions	Telstra Dome (crowd: 27,211)
7.4 (46); 14.7 (91); 17.11 (113); 21.16 (142)	Q1; Q2; Q3; Final	1.1 (7); 1.5 (11); 2.12 (24); 8.12 (60)	Umpires: McLaren, Grun, Pannell; Television broadcast: Network Ten
Marcus Allan made his AFL debut.

===== Round 20 =====
Round 20
Sunday, 20 August (1:10 pm)	Brisbane Lions	def. by	West Coast	The Gabba (crowd: 23,764)
1.3 (9); 5.6 (36); 6.8 (44); 7.10 (52)	Q1; Q2; Q3; Final	1.5 (11); 8.8 (56); 11.15 (81); 16.18 (114)	Umpires: Donlon, Meredith, Wenn; Television broadcast: Nine Network
Colm Begley made his AFL debut.

===== Round 21 =====
Round 21
Saturday, 26 August (7:10 pm)	Sydney	def.	Brisbane Lions	Telstra Stadium (crowd: 37,659)
3.2 (20); 7.4 (46); 9.8 (62); 14.13 (97)	Q1; Q2; Q3; Final	3.1 (19); 4.2 (26); 5.3 (33); 5.10 (40)	Umpires: Davis, James, Grun; Television broadcast: Fox Footy Channel

===== Round 22 =====
Round 22 (Father's Day)
Saturday, 2 September (7:10 pm)	Brisbane Lions	def. by	St Kilda	The Gabba (crowd: 27,101)
3.4 (22); 4.7 (31); 7.11 (53); 7.15 (57)	Q1; Q2; Q3; Final	4.1 (25); 10.5 (65); 12.9 (81); 16.12 (108)	Umpires: McLaren, Grun, Quigley; Television broadcast: Network Ten
Sherman 4 Johnson, Adcock, Bradshaw 1	Goals	3 Brooks, Harvey, Gehrig; 2 Milne; 1 Riewoldt, Goddard, Koschitzke, Gram, L. Fisher
Voss, Adcock, Sherman, Black, Merrett, Harding	Best	Ball, Dal Santo, Baker, Harvey, Brooks, Goddard, Gram
Nil	Injuries	R. Clarke (concussion), Hudghton (ankle) replaced in selected side by Blake
Nil	Reports	Nil
This was St Kilda's first win at The Gabba since Round 8, 1991, breaking an 11-game losing streak at the venue.

== Ladder ==
2006 AFL ladder
Pos	Team	Pld	W	L	D	PF	PA	PP	Pts	
1	West Coast (P)	22	17	5	0	2257	1874	120.4	68	Finals series
2	Adelaide	22	16	6	0	2331	1640	142.1	64	Finals series
3	Fremantle	22	15	7	0	2079	1893	109.8	60	Finals series
4	Sydney	22	14	8	0	2098	1630	128.7	56	Finals series
5	Collingwood	22	14	8	0	2345	1965	119.3	56	Finals series
6	St Kilda	22	14	8	0	2074	1752	118.4	56	Finals series
7	Melbourne	22	13	8	1	2146	1957	109.7	54	Finals series
8	Western Bulldogs	22	13	9	0	2311	2173	106.4	52	Finals series
9	Richmond	22	11	11	0	1934	2245	86.1	44	
10	Geelong	22	10	11	1	1982	2002	99.0	42	
11	Hawthorn	22	9	13	0	1834	2140	85.7	36	
12	Port Adelaide	22	8	14	0	1911	2151	88.8	32	
13	Brisbane Lions	22	7	15	0	1844	2239	82.4	28	
14	Kangaroos	22	7	15	0	1754	2167	80.9	28	
15	Essendon	22	3	18	1	2021	2469	81.9	14	
16	Carlton	22	3	18	1	1791	2415	74.2	14	

Source: AFL ladder
Rules for classification: 1) points; 2) percentage; 3) number of points for.
(P) Premiers
