= 2002 AFL Grand Final =

Grand final of the 2002 Australian Football League season

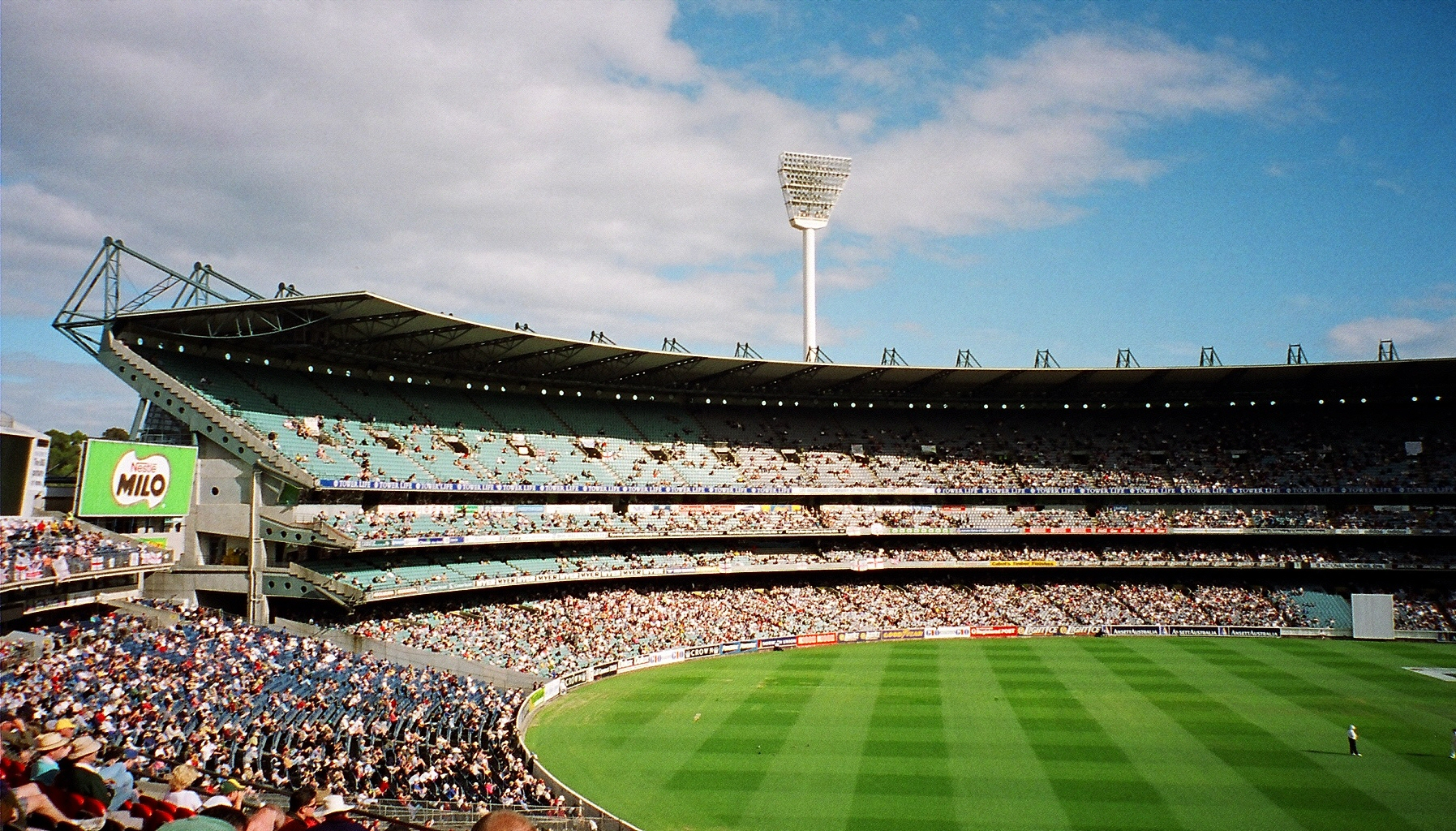
- The Melbourne Cricket Ground, where the 2002 AFL Grand Final took place.

Collingwood	Brisbane Lions
9.12 (66)	10.15 (75)
	1	2	3	4
COLL	1.4 (10)	4.4 (28)	8.10 (58)	9.12 (66)
BL	0.4 (4)	4.12 (36)	8.14 (62)	10.15 (75)
- Date: 28 September 2002
- Stadium: Melbourne Cricket Ground
- Attendance: 91,817
- Favourite: Brisbane Lions
- Umpires: Brett Allen, Mathew James, Stephen McBurney

Ceremonies
- Pre-match entertainment: Killing Heidi, The Whitlams, Kate Ceberano, The Human Tide and Mark Seymour
- National anthem: Kate Ceberano

Accolades
- Norm Smith Medallist: Nathan Buckley (Collingwood)
- Jock McHale Medallist: Leigh Matthews (Brisbane Lions)

Broadcast in Australia
- Network: Network Ten
- Commentators: Stephen Quartermain (Host and commentator); Anthony Hudson (Commentator); Robert Walls (Expert Commentator); Malcolm Blight (Expert Commentator); Christi Malthouse (Boundary Rider); Gerard Whateley (Boundary Rider)

The 2002 AFL Grand Final was an Australian rules football game contested between the Brisbane Lions and the Collingwood Football Club, held at the Melbourne Cricket Ground in Melbourne on 28 September 2002. It was the 106th annual grand final of the Australian Football League (formerly the Victorian Football League), staged to determine the premiers for the 2002 AFL season. The match, attended by 91,817 spectators, was won by the Brisbane Lions by a margin of 9 points, marking the club's second consecutive premiership victory, as well as its second overall since being established in 1997.

== Background ==
The Lions finished second on the AFL ladder with a 17–5 record, one game behind Port Adelaide, and overcoming Adelaide and Port Adelaide in their early finals. It was the club's second consecutive grand final, having defeated Essendon in the 2001 Grand Final.

Collingwood had reached the finals for the first time since 1994, and found its way into its first premiership decider since the 1990 Grand Final. They finished fourth on the ladder with a 13–9 record, and not much was expected of them in the final month of the year. However, the Magpies upset minor premiers Port Adelaide by 13 points in a dramatic Qualifying Final at AAMI Stadium, earning a week's rest before beating Adelaide 13.13 (91) to 9.9 (63) in the preliminary final at the Melbourne Cricket Ground.

Jason Cloke from Collingwood was suspended during the week after being charged for striking Tyson Edwards in the nose during their preliminary final victory against Adelaide. This controversy dominated headlines during the week in the buildup to the grand final. Also in the week leading up to the grand final, Brisbane's Simon Black was awarded the Brownlow Medal.

== Match summary ==
In a tight and overall enthralling exhibition of Australian rules football, Brisbane withstood a brave challenge from Collingwood to win the 2002 AFL Grand Final by nine points, taking out their second successive flag. It was the first time since 1989 that the grand final was decided by less than four goals, with grand finals having often been one-sided affairs throughout the 1990s.

=== First quarter ===
The game was played in cold conditions with rain off-and-on throughout. In a tight, low-scoring first quarter, neither team could manage a goal until very late, Collingwood's Anthony Rocca kicking the first goal in the 27th minute. The quarter time score of 1.4 (10) vs 0.4 (4) was the lowest-scoring quarter in a grand final since 1960, and ended Brisbane's VFL/AFL record streak of 253 consecutive quarters in which it scored at least one goal.

=== Second quarter ===
Brisbane finally kicked its first goal in the 5th minute of the second quarter, Shaun Hart converting from general play in the forward pocket. Throughout the second quarter, Brisbane gained control of general play, but repeatedly failed to convert this advantage on the scoreboard. Collingwood regained the lead with a goal from a set shot and 50m penalty to Josh Fraser in the 14th minute, then extended it with another to Rocca from a down-field free kick in the 18th minute. Simon Black kicked Brisbane's second goal in the 22nd minute, and Tarkyn Lockyer responded with a set shot goal in the 27th minute. By the 28th minute of the quarter, the score was Collingwood 4.4 (28) leading Brisbane 2.12 (24), the Lions having kicked 2.8 for the quarter from its repeated forward entries, although had not missed many easy shots, with Collingwood's defenders keeping the Lions to hurried or wide-angle shots. But, two late goals – to Craig McRae in the 29th minute from a free kick with advantage at full forward, then Alastair Lynch from a 20m set shot – Brisbane took an eight point lead into half time. Overall in the second quarter, Brisbane had 24 inside-50s for 4.8 (32), and Collingwood had only eight for 3.0 (18).

=== Third quarter ===
After Brisbane's ground dominance in the second quarter, the third quarter was much more evenly contested, and early goals to Fraser for Collingwood (2nd minute), Lynch for Brisbane (4th minute) and Rocca (5th minute) brought the margin back within a goal. Collingwood regained the lead in the 12th minute when Nathan Buckley kicked his first goal. No goals were kicked over the next ten minutes, until Lynch regained the lead for Brisbane in the 22nd minute. Rocca then kicked his fourth goal to regain the lead in the 25th minute. As in the second quarter, Brisbane finished with two quick late goals – Jonathan Brown kicking his first goal in the 30th minute, then Michael Voss one minute later. Collingwood was the more wasteful in front of goal in the third quarter, kicking 4.6 (30) to Brisbane's 4.2 (26), and at three-quarter time, Brisbane led 8.14 (62) to 8.10 (58).

=== Fourth quarter ===
A tight opening to the final quarter saw no score until the eighth minute, when Rocca famously lined up for his fifth goal from a 50m set shot near the boundary line. Rocca thought he had kicked a goal and began to celebrate, but the goal umpire ruled it a behind; Rocca was known for his long kicking, and the ball crossed the goal line above the height of the posts making it a difficult score to judge, but in its post match review, the AFL confirmed the goal umpire's decision. Three minutes later, Josh Fraser marked with the flight of the ball in the goal square, and kicked his third goal to put Collingwood ahead by three points. Another chance to score for Collingwood off the ensuing centre clearance was rushed through for a behind, in what was Collingwood's last score of the game, as heavy rain began to fall.

In the 14th minute, a kick to a pack at full-forward ended with a free kick to Alastair Lynch, who kicked his fourth goal and put Brisbane back in front by two points. Both teams had opportunities over the next ten minutes, and a behind by Jason Akermanis in the 19th minute extended the lead to three points. Then, in the 24th minute with just under five minutes of game time remaining, Akermanis roved the front of a marking contest at full forward and kicked a goal to put Brisbane nine points ahead. There was no further score, and Brisbane won by the nine point margin.

=== Norm Smith Medal ===
Nathan Buckley of the Magpies was awarded the Norm Smith Medal as the best player afield, despite the fact that he finished on the losing side. It was the third time a player had won the Norm Smith Medal without being on the winning premiership team. Out of respect for his teammates, Buckley took the medal off as he returned from the dais. Buckley polled 12 votes for the medal, and teammate Anthony Rocca finished second with 8 votes; Nigel Lappin was the highest-placing Lion with 5 votes, Voss polled 4 and Simon Black 1.

To meet the timeline for compiling the votes, the panellists were asked to lodge their votes during the latter part of the final quarter, with some doing so as early as halfway through the quarter. Three of the five panellists famously claimed in the days after the match that they would have awarded more votes to Michael Voss had they voted after the final siren, as he had been pivotal in the dying minutes of the game – although it was never determined whether or not these extra votes would have been enough to make up the eight vote gap to Buckley. Nevertheless, practices were changed to ensure votes were not cast until after the final siren from 2003 onwards.

Norm Smith Medal voting tally
Position	Player	Club	Total votes	Vote summary
1 (winner)	Nathan Buckley	Collingwood	12	3, 3, 1, 3, 2
2	Anthony Rocca	Collingwood	8	2, 2, 2, 2, 0
3	Nigel Lappin	Brisbane Lions	5	1, 0, 0, 1, 3
4	Michael Voss	Brisbane Lions	4	0, 1, 3, 0, 0
5	Simon Black	Brisbane Lions	1	0, 0, 0, 0, 1

Voter	Role	3 Votes	2 Votes	1 Vote
Robert Walls	Network 10	Nathan Buckley	Anthony Rocca	Nigel Lappin
Patrick Smith	The Australian	Nathan Buckley	Anthony Rocca	Michael Voss
Geoff Slattery	AFL Record	Michael Voss	Anthony Rocca	Nathan Buckley
Mark Duffield	The West Australian	Nathan Buckley	Anthony Rocca	Nigel Lappin
Dwayne Russell	ABC Radio	Nigel Lappin	Nathan Buckley	Simon Black

== Teams ==
Collingwood	Brisbane Lions

Collingwood
B:	26 Ben Johnson	14 Shane Wakelin	8 James Clement
HB:	15 Carl Steinfort	35 Simon Prestigiacomo	37 Ryan Lonie
C:	11 Shane O'Bree	5 Nathan Buckley (c)	9 Glenn Freeborn
HF:	1 Leon Davis	23 Anthony Rocca	19 Nick Davis
F:	10 Rupert Betheras	20 Chris Tarrant	25 Josh Fraser
Foll:	12 Steven McKee	17 Scott Burns	18 Paul Licuria
Int:	24 Tarkyn Lockyer	29 Heath Scotland	7 Jarrod Molloy
Int:	4 Alan Didak		
Coach:	Michael Malthouse		

Brisbane Lions
B:	2 Chris Johnson	22 Chris Scott	23 Justin Leppitsch
HB:	6 Luke Power	15 Mal Michael	10 Marcus Ashcroft
C:	32 Shaun Hart	3 Michael Voss (c)	13 Martin Pike
HF:	1 Des Headland	16 Jonathan Brown	44 Nigel Lappin
F:	12 Jason Akermanis	11 Alastair Lynch	33 Darryl White
Foll:	27 Clark Keating	20 Simon Black	5 Brad Scott
Int:	43 Beau McDonald	4 Craig McRae	8 Tim Notting
Int:	34 Aaron Shattock		
Coach:	Leigh Matthews		

== Scorecard ==
Scorecard
Saturday, 28 September (2:30 pm)	Collingwood	def. by	Brisbane Lions	MCG (crowd: 91,817)
1.4 (10); 4.4 (28); 8.10 (58); 9.12 (66)	Q1; Q2; Q3; Final	0.4 (4); 4.12 (36); 8.14 (62); 10.15 (75)	Umpires: Allen, James, McBurney; Norm Smith Medal: Nathan Buckley (Collingwood); Television broadcast: Network Ten; National anthem: Kate Ceberano
Rocca 4, Fraser 3, Buckley, Lockyer	Goals	Lynch 4, Akermanis, Black, Brown, Hart, McRae, Voss
Buckley, Rocca, Burns, Fraser, Wakelin, Lonie, Freeborn, Betheras	Best	Voss, Keating, Lynch, Lappin
Injuries	McDonald (dislocated shoulder), Pike (groin)
Licuria (kneeing Akermanis to the head in the third quarter), Burns (striking Brown in the second quarter)	Reports	Nil

Team stats	(Coll)	(B.L.)
Kicks	193	198
Marks	64	87
Handballs	79	83
Tackles	73	44
Hitouts	27	48
Frees	24	16

=== List ===
Collingwood	66–75	Brisbane Lions
(9.12)		(10.15)

Position	Player	Pos'ns	Goals
Forward	Rupert Betheras	14	
Forward	Chris Tarrant	12	
Forward	Josh Fraser	13	3
Half-Forward	Leon Davis	0	
Half-Forward	Anthony Rocca	12	4
Half-Forward	Nick Davis	8	
Centre	Shane O'Bree	18	
Centre	Nathan Buckley	32	1
Centre	Glenn Freeborn	17	
Half-Back	Carl Steinfort	2	
Half-Back	Simon Prestigiacomo	5	
Half-Back	Ryan Lonie	21	
Back	Ben Johnson	14	
Back	Shane Wakelin	10	
Back	James Clement	18	
Rover	Paul Licuria	14	
Follower	Steve McKee	16	
Follower	Scott Burns	17	
Interchange:
Interchange	Tarkyn Lockyer	10	1
Interchange	Heath Scotland	8	
Interchange	Jarrod Molloy	1	
Interchange	Alan Didak	10	
Coach:
Mick Malthouse

Position	Player	Pos'ns	Goals
Forward	Jason Akermanis	15	1
Forward	Alastair Lynch	9	4
Forward	Darryl White	9	
Half-Forward	Des Headland	13	
Half-Forward	Jonathan Brown	14	1
Half-Forward	Nigel Lappin	28	
Centre	Shaun Hart	19	1
Centre	Michael Voss	26	1
Centre	Martin Pike	12	
Half-Back	Luke Power	13	
Half-Back	Mal Michael	9	
Half-Back	Marcus Ashcroft	14	
Back	Chris Johnson	13	
Back	Chris Scott	17	
Back	Justin Leppitsch	6	
Rover	Brad Scott	14	
Follower	Clark Keating	7	
Follower	Simon Black	22	1
Interchange:
Interchange	Beau McDonald	0	
Interchange	Tim Notting	14	
Interchange	Craig McRae	7	1
Interchange	Aaron Shattock	0	
Coach:
Leigh Matthews

== See also ==
- 2002 AFL season
