= Carl Steinfort =

Australian rules footballer (born 1977)

Personal information
- Born: 1 April 1977 (age 49)
- Original team: Mazenod Old Collegians / Central U18
- Debut: Round 22, 31 August 1996, Geelong vs. Carlton, at Kardinia Park

Playing career^{1}
Years	Club	Games (Goals)
1996–2000	Geelong	65 (19)
2001–2002	Collingwood	27 (7)
Total		92 (26)
- ^{1} Playing statistics correct to the end of 2002.

Career highlights
- AFL Rising Star nominee: 1997

Carl Steinfort (born 1 April 1977) is an Australian rules footballer who played for both the Geelong (1996–2000) and Collingwood (2001–2002) football clubs in the Australian Football League (AFL).

== Geelong career ==
Steinfort had a solid five-year stint at Geelong, where at one stage he was regarded as one of the premier run with players in the competition, and was highly regarded by teammates and supporters. Unfortunately his appearances were sometimes limited through injury. His most memorable games included winning an AFL Rising Star nomination in 1997 and his tagging job on Collingwood captain Nathan Buckley in the Cats round 12 defeat of the Magpies.

== Collingwood career ==
Along with other experienced players, including Jarrod Molloy, James Clement, Brodie Holland, Shane Wakelin and Chad Rintoul, Steinfort arrived at Victoria Park in season 2001. After a consistent beginning to the year, Steinfort's form dwindled later in the season, failing to register double-figured possessions after the round 17 defeat of Fremantle at Subiaco Oval.

The following season was to be Steinfort's last at the club, and at league level. With the Magpies younger players developing quickly, Steinfort's opportunities were limited. Aside from a solid performance against Essendon on Anzac Day, it appeared the journeyman's career was coming to a close. Collingwood coach Mick Malthouse surprised all when he named Steinfort in the team to face Port Adelaide at AAMI Stadium in the Qualifying Final, and he performed well, gathering a season-high 18 disposals and scored a goal, as the Magpies trumped a shellshocked Power outfit. Steinfort's September purple-patch continued into the remainder of the finals series, first playing a serviceable role in the side's win over Adelaide in the Preliminary Final, before successfully curtailing the influence of the dangerous Des Headland in the 2002 AFL Grand Final, however his team still lost.

Surprisingly, it was to be Steinfort's final match, retiring after he was told by Malthouse that he could expect a struggle to play the majority of the following season in the senior side, his retirement paving the way for Murray Bushrangers youngster Luke Mullins to be selected by the club in the 2003 Pre-Season Draft.

Since retiring Steinfort, a qualified accountant, has worked for various charities, including SurfAid International and along with his wife, has set up an orphanage in Kathmandu, Nepal.
