= Ryan Jackson =

Ryan Jackson may refer to:

- Ryan Jackson (Australian footballer) (born 1987), Australian rules football player
- Ryan Jackson (English footballer) (born 1990), English association football player
- Ryan Jackson (first baseman/outfielder) (born 1971), American baseball player
- Ryan Jackson (infielder) (born 1988), American baseball player
