= Cameron Thurley =

Australian rules footballer (born 1981)

Personal information
- Full name: Cameron Thurley
- Born: 26 November 1981 (age 44)
- Original team: Tasmania Devils
- Height: 183 cm (6 ft 0 in)
- Weight: 76 kg (168 lb)

Playing career^{1}
Years	Club	Games (Goals)
2005	Geelong	7 (12)
2006	Kangaroos	5 (0)
Total		12 (12)
- ^{1} Playing statistics correct to the end of 2006.

Cameron Thurley (born 26 November 1981) is an Australian rules footballer who played for Geelong and the Kangaroos in the Australian Football League (AFL), Clarence Football Club in the Tasmanian Statewide League and the Tasmanian Devils in the Victorian Football League.

Thurley played for Clarence Football Club in the Statewide League in 2000, where he was dropped for the Grand Final against Northern Bombers. He then joining the Tasmania Devils in the VFL in 2001. He was then drafted by the Geelong Football Club in the 2003 AFL draft with the 22nd selection. He played in two Wizard Cup Games in 2004 but failed to play a senior match in 2004 as Geelong made a Preliminary Final. He made his AFL debut in 2005, and played in seven games, kicking 12 goals, including four in his second game. He then decided to leave the Cats at the end of the 2005 season and was selected by the Kangaroos with the seventh selection of the 2006 Pre-season draft. He made his debut for the Kangaroos in the opening game of the season, but only managed five games for them before being delisted at the end of the 2006 season.

He returned to the Tasmanian Devils in 2007, after his AFL career before moving to the backline in 2008, where he starred, winning their best and fairest award. When the Tasmanian Devils finished in 2008 he returned to the newly formed Tasmanian State League to play with Clarence. He played a major role in helping Clarence to the 2009 TSL Premiership by playing inspiring football, in particular in the preliminary final against Burnie when he took a towering pack mark late in the final quarter. In 2010 Clarence won back to back premiership in the TSL beating Devonport very comfortably at Bellerive Oval in front of crowd of 6,000 plus supporters. Cameron played a star role in the win and dominated from the opening bounce finishing with 35+ possessions and kicking one goal and was awarded the Darrel Baldock Medal as Best On Ground. After accepting his medals on the dias, Cameron grabbed the microphone and famously said “we’re going to paint the town red and white tonight”!!He went on to win the Senior Best & Fairest in 2010 & 2011 and also won leading goal kicker for Clarence in that year. Cameron captained Clarence in 2011, 2012, and 2013.

Over his career, Cameron won multiple Team of The Year Awards which included captaining the Team of the Year in 2011 and winning the RACT Media Award in the same year.

Cameron sustained serious injuries from a fall down a flight of stairs in 2013, concluding a football career that included playing over 100 senior games for Clarence and the Tasmanian Devils. His medical treatment involved four brain surgeries, a 22-day induced coma, and a three month hospital stay. Assisted by his family, friends and the Tasmanian community, he underwent rehabilitation to regain his ability to walk and talk, relying on his personal determination and a positive mindset during the recovery process.

clubRoos steal new hope for glory</ Mref>
