= Lukas Markovic =

Australian rules footballer (born 1987)

Personal information
- Full name: Lukas Markovic
- Born: 5 January 1987 (age 39)
- Original team: Box Hill Hawks (VFL)
- Draft: No. 63, 2009 National Draft, Western Bulldogs
- Height: 193 cm (6 ft 4 in)
- Weight: 95 kg (209 lb)
- Position: Defender

Playing career^{1}
Years	Club	Games (Goals)
2011–2013	Western Bulldogs	29 (5)
- ^{1} Playing statistics correct to the end of 2013.

Lukas Markovic (born 5 January 1987) is an Australian rules footballer who played for the AFL Western Bulldogs and the VFL Footscray Bulldogs.

Originally selected pick 19 in the 2006 Rookie Draft by Hawthorn, Markovic spent 2 years on the club's list, his 2007 season was curtailed by a broken ankle, before being delisted at the end of 2008 without playing any games.

Markovic was co-captain of Hawthorn's VFL affiliate, The Box Hill Hawks in 2009.

He was then drafted in the 2009 Draft at pick 63 to the Bulldogs, where he was on the senior list until being delisted at the end of 2013. In 2011, his first year playing with the Western Bulldogs, he finished equal 10th in the club Charles Sutton [Best and Fairest] Award. In 2012 he took out the Western Bulldogs Community Award.

On 7 February 2014, Markovic and Nick Lower were named the inaugural captains of the newly established VFL club, the Footscray Bulldogs.
