= Dandenong Stingrays =

Australian rules football team in Victoria

Names
- Full name: Dandenong Southern Stingrays Football Club
- Nickname: Stingrays

2026 season
- After finals: 2nd (Runners Up)
- Home-and-away season: 3rd

Club details
- Founded: 1992; 34 years ago
- Colours: Black Gold
- Competition: Talent League
- Premierships: Talent League (1) 2018
- Ground: Shepley Oval, Dandenong

Other information
- Official website: DSFC

The Dandenong Southern Stingrays are an Australian rules football team in the Talent League, the Victorian statewide under-18s competition.

1992 saw the birth of the Southern Stingrays, developed under the leadership of Steve Kennedy (Regional Manager) and Ron Roach (Promotions Manager) with its home base located at Ben Kavanagh Reserve, Mordialloc. The side is coached in the inaugural year by Peter Russo.

In 1995 the club moved from Mordialloc to Dandenong and it also changed its name to the Dandenong Southern Stingrays. The club is currently under the leadership of Toby Jedwab (Region Talent Manager) and Ashley Dawes (Administration & Operations Coordinator) with the home base located at Shepley Oval, Dandenong. The Boys side is coached by Nick Cox, while the Girls are coached by Josh Moore.

During the history in both Boy and Girl leagues, they each won one premiership over the Oakleigh Chargers in both Leagues. The Boys won in 2018 by a goal, whilst the Girls won in 2026 by 5 goals.

== Results ==
=== Premiers (1) ===
- 2018

=== Runners Up (7) ===
- 1997, 2005, 2008, 2009, 2013, 2022, 2026

=== Minor Premiers (4) ===
- 1997, 2010, 2016, 2018

=== Wooden Spoons (0) ===
- Nil

=== Yearly Ladder Placings (1992 - 2019) ===
Year	92	93	94	95	96	97	98	99	00	01	02	03	04	05	06	07	08	09	10	11	12	13	14	15	16	17	18	19
Position	2	4	5	3	9	1	2	9	2	7	6	3	5	3	11	10	2	3	1	4	3	3	7	2	1	3	1	8

=== Grand Finals ===
The Stingrays have made the Grand final on eight occasions and have won one premiership in 2018.

- 1997: North Ballarat Rebels - 16.15 (111) d. Dandenong Stingrays - 10.16 (76)
- 2005: Gippsland Power - 12.9 (81) d. Dandenong Stingrays - 10.6 (66)
- 2008: Murray Bushrangers - 21.16 (142) d. Dandenong Stingrays - 9.7 (61)
- 2009: Calder Cannons 17.10 (112) d. Dandenong Stingrays - 14.14 (98)
- 2013: Eastern Ranges - 24.8 (152) d. Dandenong Stingrays - 5.10 (40)
- 2018: Dandenong Stingrays - 12.8 (80) d. Oakleigh Chargers - 11.8 (74)
- 2022: Sandringham Dragons - 14.10 (94) d. Dandenong Stingrays - 7.9 (51)
- 2026: Gippsland Power - 16.10 (106) d. Dandenong Stingrays - 10.11 (71)

=== Players drafted to the AFL ===
- 1992: Darren King, Danny Winkel, Kane Batzloff, Justin Leppitsch
- 1993: Christian O'Brien, Michael Prentice, Shayne Smith, Clint Shaw
- 1994: Jeff White, Matthew Joy, Chad Liddell, Michael Agnello, Austinn Jones
- 1995: Chad Morrison, Ashley Gehling, Daniel Marshall, Ryan Aitken
- 1996: Paul Corrigan, Tom Gilligan, Mark Winterton, Chris Holcombe
- 1997: Travis Johnstone, Trent Croad, Kris Massie, Andrew Williams, Craig Black, Darren Hulme
- 1998: Adam Ramanauskas, Brendan Fevola, Toby Thurstans, Craig Jacotine, Steven Rode
- 1999: David Hille, Daniel Wulf
- 2000: Laurence Angwin, Ryan Lonie, Michael Handby, Adam McPhee, Chris Newman, Nathan Lonie, Stephen Milne
- 2001: -
- 2002: Steven Salopek, Paul Johnson, Matthew Boyd
- 2003: Shane Tuck, Aaron Edwards
- 2004: Jarred Moore, Damien McCormack, Jayden Attard, Luke Forsyth, Anthony Raso, Zane Leonard
- 2005: Nathan Jones, Ryan Cook, Travis Tuck
- 2006: Andrejs Everitt, Greg Bentley, Daniel Nicholls
- 2007: Jarrad Grant, Scott Simpson, Jarrad Boumann
- 2008: Tom Gillies, Ash Smith, Shane Savage, Steven Gaertner.
- 2009: Tom Scully, Ryan Bastinac, Dylan Roberton, Rohan Kerr, Levi Casboult
- 2010: Thomas Lynch, Jake Batchelor, Mitchell Hallahan, Luke Parker, Andrew McInnes, Arryn Siposs, Tom Curren,
- 2011: Matthew Buntine, Nick Haynes, Todd Elton, Jordan Kelly, Brett O'Hanlon, Darren Minchington, Piva Wright
- 2012: Lachie Whitfield, Taylor Garner, Nathan Wright, Lewis Pierce, Tim McGenniss
- 2013: Zak Jones, Billy Hartung, James Harmes
- 2014: Tom Lamb, Jack Lonie, Bailey Dale, Mitch White
- 2015: Jacob Weitering, Kieran Collins, Brandon White, Liam Hulett, Bailey Rice, Kurt Mutimer, Gach Nyuon
- 2016: Josh Battle, Myles Poholke, Mitch McCarthy
- 2017: Luke Davies-Uniacke, Hunter Clark, Aiden Bonar, Tom De Koning, Oscar Clavarino, Tom Murphy
- 2018: Sam Sturt, William Hamill, Bailey Williams, Zac Foot, Toby Bedford, Lachie Young, Sam Fletcher, Matthew Cottrell, Mitchell Riordan, Jordyn Allen, Shelley Heath
- 2019: Hayden Young, Sam De Koning, Ned Cahill, Cody Weightman, Bigoa Nyuon, Molly McDonald, Isabella Shannon, Brooke Vernon, Courtney Jones
- 2020 – Deakyn Smith
- 2021 – Mac Andrew, Connor MacDonald, Judson Clarke, Miller Bergman
- 2022 – Jaxon Binns, Henry Hustwaite
- 2023 – Harry De Mattia, Billy Wilson, Cooper Simpson
- 2024 – Harvey Langford, Cooper Hynes, Noah Mraz, Riak Andrew
- 2025 – N/A

=== Captain(s) ===
2016 Luke Dalmau (C),

2013 Nathan Foote (C),

2012

2011

2010 Luke Parker, Mitch Hallahan

2009 Ryan Bastinac, Tom Scully

2008 Ricky Ferraro, Paul Rogasch

2007 Russell Gabriel

2006 Matt Robinson, Mitch Bosward

2005 Greg Bentley

2004 Jarred Moore

2003 Kane Taylor

2002 Michael Stinear

2001 Andrew Tuck

2000 Ricky Clark

1999 Michael Ablett

1998 Craig Jacotine, Chris Fortnam

1997 Ben Lovett, Craig Black

1996 Anthony Hardie, Daniel Anderson

1995 Michael Agnello

1994 Brad Lloyd

1993 Ben Delarue

1992 Darren King

=== Best and Fairest ===
2016Thomas Glen/Myles Poholke

2015 Daniel Capiron

2014 Mirchell White

2013 Nathan Foote

2012 Tim McGenness

2011 Nick Haines

2010 Jake Batchelor

2009 Luke Parker

2008 Tom Gillies

2007 Matthew Clark

2006 Curtis Barker

2005 Greg Bentley

2004 Jarred Moore

2003 Marc Holt

2002 Michael Stinear

2001 Andrew Tuck

2000 Chris Newman

1999 Michael Burke

1998 Ashley Roberts

1997 Trent Croad

1996 Ben Lovett

1995 George Harrack

1994 Austinn Jones

1993 Shayne Smith

1992 Justin Leppitsch

=== Coaches ===
- Craig Black (2014–present)
- Graeme Yeats (2004–2013)
- Rob Dean (1996–2003)
- Greg Hutchison (1993–1995)
- Peter Russo (1992)

== Talent League Girls ==
- Premierships (1): 2026
- Runners-up (1): 2022
