= Jarred Moore =

Australian rules footballer and coach

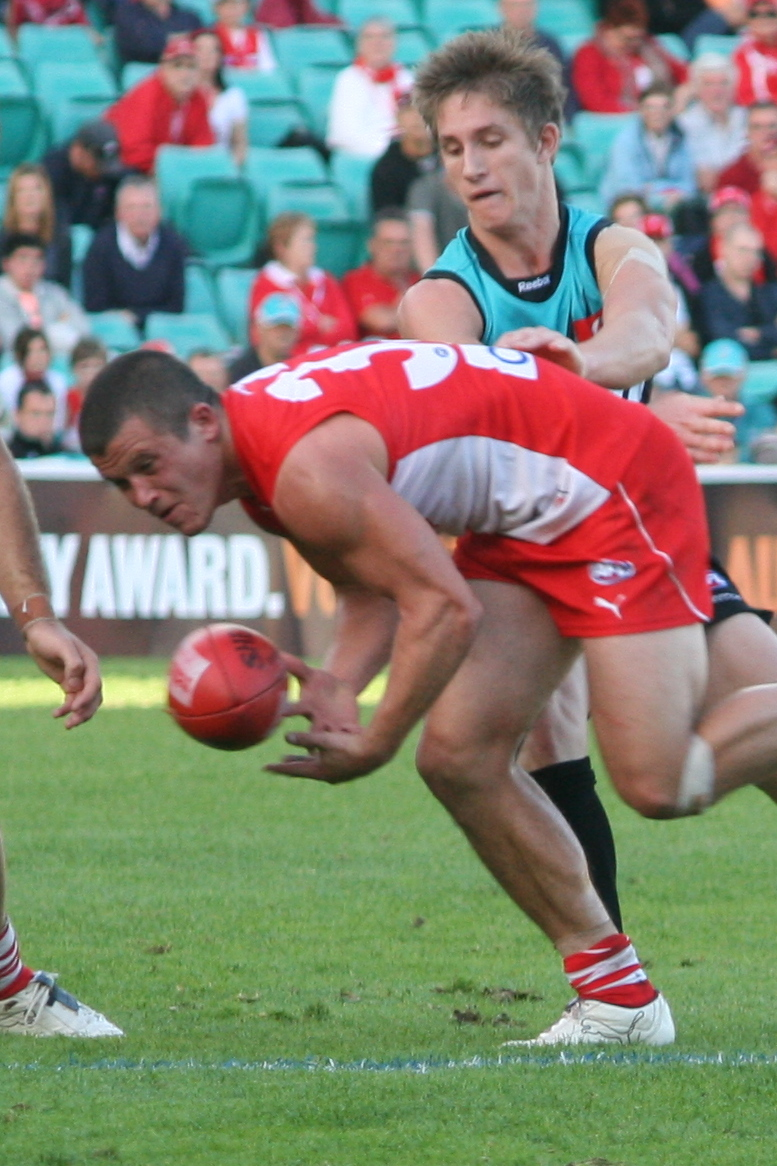
- Moore (centre) in 2009

Personal information
- Full name: Jarred Moore
- Born: 6 March 1986 (age 40)
- Original team: Dandenong Stingrays (TAC Cup)
- Draft: No. 31, 2004 National Draft, Sydney
- Height: 177 cm (5 ft 10 in)
- Weight: 84 kg (185 lb)
- Position: Midfielder-small forward

Playing career^{1}
Years	Club	Games (Goals)
2005–2011	Sydney	68 (52)
- ^{1} Playing statistics correct to the end of 2012.

Jarred Moore (born 6 March 1986) is an Australian rules footballer in the Australian Football League (AFL) who served as an assistant coach with the North Melbourne Football Club. He is now head coach at local football club Langwarrin in the MPNFL.

Moore grew up in Langwarrin and played for the Dandenong Stingrays in the TAC Cup, from where he was recruited as the number 31 draft pick in the 2004 National Draft by the Sydney Swans. He was touted as a potential number 1 draft pick in 2004. due to an exceptional performance in the grand final of the TAC Cup. Additionally, Moore was captain of the Dandenong Stingrays in 2004 and also won their best-and-fairest award in the same year.

He made his AFL debut for the Swans in Round 7, 2005 against Essendon. He spent three years playing primarily in the ACT/NSW reserve football league, with the occasional outing for the seniors before finally breaking into the senior team in the 2008 season. This season proved to be the making of Moore as he took up a spot in the Swans' forward line. His clever and very accurate kicking set up numerous goals and he proved to be a consistent avenue to goal.

In 2009, Moore's form dipped from the outstanding year he had in 2008. He drifted in and out of games and his season was ended prematurely against Collingwood at the MCG when he bravely backed back into a pack and had his lung punctured.

In 2010, Moore regained a consistent place in the Swans' forward line. His organisation and clever disposal were the two things the coaches seemed to be most pleased with through the season and his leadership seemed to improve as well, in the absences of the likes of Daniel Bradshaw, Ben McGlynn and Adam Goodes (when playing through the midfield).

After the 2012 season, after Sydney had won the grand final, Moore was de-listed by the Swans after playing no games in 2012.

In 2013, Moore was recruited by club Werribee in the Victorian Football League (VFL). In his first year at the Tigers, he won the club's best-and-fairest award.

In 2014, Moore then made it back-to-back club best-and-fairest awards for the Tigers.
