= Justin Sweeney =

Australian rules footballer

Personal information
- Born: 25 December 1987 (age 38)
- Original team: Tyabb
- Debut: 19 May 2007, St Kilda vs. Hawthorn, at MCG
- Height: 186 cm (6 ft 1 in)
- Weight: 84 kg (185 lb)

Playing career^{1}
Years	Club	Games (Goals)
2007	St Kilda	1 (0)
- ^{1} Playing statistics correct to the end of 2007.

Justin Sweeney (born 25 December 1987) is an Australian rules footballer in the Australian Football League.

He was recruited as the number 71 draft pick in the 2005 AFL draft from Tyabb. He made his debut in round 8 of 2007 against Hawthorn at the MCG in slippery conditions. Sweeney was a marking half-forward who was a prominent goalkicker in the VFL.
