= Rupert Betheras =

Australian rules footballer, born 1975

Personal information
- Full name: Rupert James Betheras
- Nickname: Rupe
- Born: 23 November 1975 (age 50)
- Original team: East Perth (WAFL)
- Debut: 11 April 1999, Collingwood vs. West Coast Eagles, at Victoria Park

Playing career^{1}
Years	Club	Games (Goals)
1999–2003	Collingwood	85 (35)
- ^{1} Playing statistics correct to the end of 2003.

Career highlights
- Joseph Wren Memorial Trophy 1998; Harry Collier Trophy 1999; Wrecker Award 1999

Rupert James Betheras (born 23 November 1975) is a former Australian rules footballer and a contemporary artist, whose practice has largely been painting-based and also involved installation and sculpture. As a painter, Betheras began as a teenage graffiti artist on the streets of Melbourne.

== Football career ==
=== VAFA and WAFL ===
Betheras played for Collingwood between 1999 and 2003, making 85 appearances for the club. He later came to be regarded as a Collingwood cult figure, with the club's history website describing how he became endeared to Collingwood supporters during his time in the black and white jumper. Betheras was delisted at the end of the 2003 season, when he was 27 years old.

=== AFL ===
In 1997, he was recruited to the Fremantle Dockers rookie list, before moving back to Melbourne and earned a spot on the Collingwood Magpies rookie list. He was then drafted late in the 1998 AFL draft at no. 76 by Collingwood, and made his debut in 1999 at Victoria Park against the West Coast Eagles.

Betheras played for Collingwood between 1999 and 2003, making 85 appearances for the club. He later came to be regarded as a Collingwood cult figure, with the club's history website describing how he became endeared to Collingwood supporters during his time in the black and white jumper. Betheras was delisted at the end of the 2003 season, when he was 27 years old.

Affectionately known by fans as 'Rupe', he began his AFL career at the mature age of 23, after spending 1998 on the club's now abolished supplementary list. He began the season fortunate to make the squad, but ended it as captain and the Best and Fairest winner in the reserves, prompting the club to use the 75th selection of the 1998 National Draft on the ex-surfer.

Betheras made an immediate impact in his first season, making his debut against the West Coast Eagles in the second last game played at Victoria Park in round three. He impressed initially, before he was demoted back to the reserves. It was here that Betheras showed his mettle, rebounding to regain selection in the round ten loss to Sydney at the SCG, famous for being the afternoon on which Swans spearhead Tony Lockett booted the 1300th goal of his career, breaking former Magpie Gordon Coventry's record of 1299. Although the majority of his teammates were swamped by the home team's onslaught, Betheras was unperturbed, hitting the Swans with everything, tackling with vigour and displaying his future trademark endeavor.

Despite his lack of size, Betheras proved himself an excellent mark and more than useful by hand or by foot, and was Nathan Buckley's right-hand man for much of the season underneath the packs. Betheras' rise earned him plaudits from all, including the Harry Collier Trophy as best first year player, the Wrecker Award as player with most desire, as well as finishing 9th for the Copeland Trophy.

Betheras backed up his debut efforts the following year in playing all 22 matches and was elevated with Licuria to a deputy vice captain of the team. He was played by new coach Mick Malthouse through the midfield and out of halfback, often wracking up large possession numbers.

Season 2001 saw Betheras swap numbers, from his no. 49 to a more senior looking no.10, previously donned by Paul Williams, who had been traded to Sydney the previous summer. In his third season, Betheras lacked the opportunities at senior level, playing off halfback and through the midfield when in the senior side. He showcased his capacity as a small forward with two goals in the Anzac Day loss to Essendon in round five, whilst starring across halfback in a big win over the Eagles in round 12, having a huge impact when coming off the bench.

==== 2002 season ====
The 2002 season saw Collingwood reach the finals for the first time since 1994, and the Grand Final for the first time since 1990. Betheras played a huge role in the revival. His vigour and work ethic from half forward altered the course of many matches, including his three goals against the Lions in round eight at Colonial Stadium to turn the match on its head. He also set the Pies alight with two quickfire goals in the first Qualifying Final against Port Adelaide, before rocking the MCG to its foundations with a magnificent goal from the boundary line the two weeks later against Adelaide in the Preliminary Final.

==== 2003 season ====
In 2003, he had a disappointing season, leaving him in and out of the side early on, but by mid-year was again on track and was part of the club's improved later season form playing in 10 straight winning games before being dropped for some younger players in round 19. However, Betheras went on to play in Collingwood's Affiliate team Williamstown in the VFL in a winning Grand Final along with a young Dane Swan and future Collingwood Captain Nick Maxwell. He was delisted at the end of the season.

== Post-football career ==
After his AFL career he moved to the Northern Territory to play for NTFL club St Mary's. He also played for South Cairns in the Cairns league and in 2007, he played for Rumbalara on the Murray River.

As a young man Betheras was interested in art and during 2001 and 2002 he planned for his career post-football and turned to being an artist. Betheras held his first solo exhibition, After Collingwood, at Alcaston Gallery, Melbourne in 2008, the year after retiring from AFL; this was followed by several more including an Alcaston-curated survey exhibition at Deakin University Art Gallery, Melbourne (Marking Tracks, 2012). He has held solo exhibitions in other public galleries including Araluen Arts Centre, Alice Springs (Field Work, 2015, relating to Inner Sanctum, 2014, and My Future Has A Past, 2015 at Alcaston Gallery), and the Northern Centre for Contemporary Art (NCCA), Darwin (Arnhem H-Way, 2014), and in other commercial galleries including Galerie Luc Berthier, Paris, France.

Betheras continues to experiment as a painter, pushing his practice in terms of his materials and in his approach to abstraction and figuration. In recent years, collaborative and relational dimensions have also come to the fore as with his work with Central Desert artist Lionel Possum, his Event Horizon exhibition in Darwin's World War II tunnel (2015), and his involvement in NCCA's Indonesian-Top End Artists' Camp (2015) and related exhibition (Cruise Control, 2016).

Betheras's AFL experience has played and continues to play a significant role in his art. 'The football connection allows me to enter places', writes Betheras on his work as an AFL coach/mentor in the Northern Territory. 'From that', he writes, 'I am able to produce artwork specific to those places and to the experience of being there'. The 'higher states of consciousness and physical application needed to perform at the highest levels of sport' are, Betheras asserts, also manifest in his artistic process as a painter. Betheras is represented in the group exhibition Leather Poisoning: Football Possessions, Counihan Gallery, Melbourne, March/April 2017; curated by Victor Griss.
