= Matthew White (footballer) =

Australian rules footballer

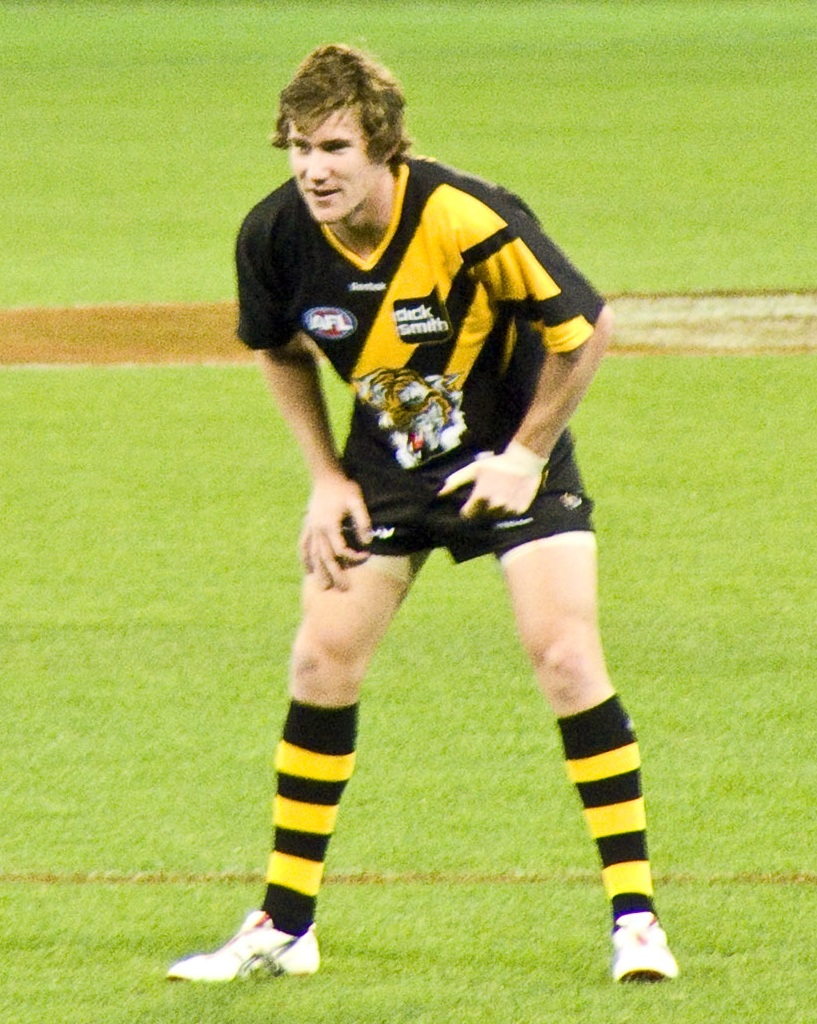
- White playing for Richmond in 2011

Personal information
- Full name: Mathew White
- Born: 15 April 1987 (age 39)
- Original team: Calder Cannons (TAC Cup)
- Draft: No. 5, 2005 Pre-season draft
- Debut: Round 10, 2006, Richmond vs. Fremantle, at Subiaco Oval
- Height: 180 cm (5 ft 11 in)
- Weight: 80 kg (176 lb)
- Position: Midfield / Wing

Playing career^{1}
Years	Club	Games (Goals)
2006–2013	Richmond	105 (54)
2014–2017	Port Adelaide	48 (44)
Total		153 (98)
- ^{1} Playing statistics correct to the end of 2017.

Career highlights
- AFL Goal of the Year: 2014

Matthew White (born 15 April 1987) is a former professional Australian rules footballer who played for the Richmond Football Club and Port Adelaide Football Club in the Australian Football League (AFL). He won the AFL Goal of the Year award while with Port Adelaide in 2014.

== Junior football ==
White played his junior football with Sunbury, west of Melbourne, and the Calder Cannons in the TAC Cup.

== AFL career ==
=== Richmond (2006–2013) ===
He was recruited to the AFL by Richmond with the fifth pick in the 2006 pre-season draft. He made his AFL debut in round 10, 2006 against Fremantle. After showing plenty of promise in the backline in 2006, the youngster had a disappointing season in 2007, playing just seven games to take his career tally to 18. Eventually White's speed and ability to kick goals saw him become a regular wingman under coach Terry Wallace. In 2008 White played a career-high 20 games, averaging 13 disposals and kicking 11 goals for the season, and in 2009 White averaged 15 disposals in his 16 games. Wallace departed at the end of 2009 and Damien Hardwick became Richmond coach in 2010. White was generally used in a more defensive role. White playing only 12 more games in the 2011 season and just 7 games followed in 2012 through a combination of injury and lack of selection. White played 16 games in 2013 after round 5, often coming on as the substitute. His pace and aerobic capacity allowed him to be a burst player from the bench. Impressing in this role he has earned a regular position in the starting 22 late in the season and White appeared certain to play in Richmond's first final in 12 years before a hamstring injury in round 23 ruled him out of the final.

=== Port Adelaide (2014–2017) ===
At the end of the 2013 AFL season, White joined the Port Adelaide Football Club as a free agent. He was delisted by Port Adelaide at the conclusion of the 2017 season and subsequently retired from playing.

== Statistics ==
Legend
G	Goals	K	Kicks	D	Disposals	T	Tackles
B	Behinds	H	Handballs	M	Marks

Season	Team	No.	Games	Totals							Averages (per game)						
Season	Team	No.	Games	G	B	K	H	D	M	T	G	B	K	H	D	M	T
2006	Richmond	35	11	2	2	69	52	121	42	30	0.2	0.2	6.3	4.7	11	3.8	2.7
2007	Richmond	35	7	1	0	35	25	60	26	15	0.1	0	5	3.6	8.6	3.7	2.1
2008	Richmond	35	20	11	7	163	104	267	85	64	0.6	0.4	8.2	5.2	13.4	4.3	3.2
2009	Richmond	35	16	7	4	132	103	235	47	63	0.4	0.3	8.3	6.4	14.9	2.9	3.9
2010	Richmond	35	16	11	9	132	51	183	54	57	0.7	0.6	8.3	3.2	11.5	3.4	3.7
2011	Richmond	35	12	7	3	97	48	145	38	49	0.6	0.3	8.1	4	12.1	3.2	4.1
2012	Richmond	35	7	4	2	38	37	75	16	11	0.6	0.3	5.4	5.3	10.7	2.3	1.6
2013	Richmond	35	16	11	6	140	61	201	53	49	0.7	0.4	8.8	3.8	12.6	3.3	3.1
2014	Port Adelaide	19	22	25	16	211	95	306	93	74	1.1	0.7	9.6	4.3	13.9	4.2	3.4
2015	Port Adelaide	19	18	17	6	157	74	231	76	51	0.9	0.3	8.7	4.1	12.8	4.2	1.4
2016	Port Adelaide	19	1	0	0	2	0	2	0	2	0.0	0.0	2.0	0.0	2.0	0.0	2.0
2017	Port Adelaide	19	7	2	4	60	33	93	22	20	0.3	0.6	8.6	4.7	13.3	3.1	0.3
Career			152	98	59	1236	683	1919	552	485	0.6	0.4	8.1	4.5	12.5	3.6	3.2
