= Nick Lower =

Australian rules footballer (born 1987)

Personal information
- Full name: Nicholas Lower
- Born: 23 June 1987 (age 39); Adelaide
- Original team: Norwood (SANFL)
- Draft: No. 30, 2005 National draft, Port Adelaide; No. 37, 2011 Rookie draft, Fremantle
- Height: 187 cm (6 ft 2 in)
- Weight: 87 kg (192 lb)
- Position: Defender / Rover

Playing career^{1}
Years	Club	Games (Goals)
2006–2009	Port Adelaide	20 (0)
2011–2012	Fremantle	22 (9)
2013	Western Bulldogs	13 (2)
Total		55 (11)
- ^{1} Playing statistics correct to the end of 2013.

Nicholas Lower (born 23 June 1987) is a retired Australian rules football player who played for Port Adelaide in the Australian Football League between 2006 and 2009, Fremantle from 2011 to 2012, and Western Bulldogs in 2013.

Lower attended Saint Ignatius' College, Adelaide before moving to Prince Alfred College with twin brother Edward.

Having ended his football career, Lower now works as a real estate agent in Melbourne.

== Playing career ==
Lower is noted for his pace, competitiveness and strength. He has mostly played on a half back flank but has the versatility to be an on-baller as well.

He played junior football for club team Walkerville before playing with South Australian National Football League (SANFL) club Norwood in 2005 before being selected at number 30 by Port Adelaide in the 2005 AFL draft.

Lower was delisted by Port Adelaide at the end of the 2009 season. After a successful 2010 season for Norwood in the SANFL, where he finished second in the Magarey Medal, he was drafted by Fremantle in the 2011 Rookie draft.

He played his first two games for Fremantle in a NAB Cup double header against Hawthorn and West Coast on 14 February 2011. After performing well throughout the 2011 preseason, he was elevated to the senior list as a nominated rookie and was named to make his debut for Fremantle in the opening round of the 2011 AFL season against Brisbane at the Gabba.

He was delisted by Fremantle at the end of the 2012 season and signed with the Western Bulldogs as a delisted Free Agent on 3 December 2012. From 2013 onwards he fitted into the Bulldogs team as a tagger. Lower was delisted by the Western Bulldogs at the end of the 2013 season.

On 7 February 2014, Lower and Lukas Markovic were named the inaugural captains of the newly established VFL club, the Footscray Bulldogs.
