= Daniel Nicholls =

Australian rules footballer

Personal information
- Born: 2 March 1987 (age 39); Victoria
- Original team: Rowville / Dandenong U18 (TAC Cup)
- Debut: Round 2, 7 April 2007, Collingwood vs. West Coast Eagles, at Subiaco Oval

Playing career^{1}
Years	Club	Games (Goals)
2007	Collingwood	1 (0)
- ^{1} Playing statistics correct to the end of 2007.

Daniel "Danny" Nicholls (born 2 March 1987) is a former Australian Rules footballer with the Collingwood Football Club in the Australian Football League.

A hard running forward pocket rover, Nicholls played for Williamstown in the Victorian Football League (VFL) throughout 2006 and was retained for season 2007. He made his AFL debut in Round 2 of the 2007 season, but did not play another game in the AFL. Whilst on the Collingwood list he suffered a stress fracture to his foot that caused him to miss most of the season. He has since continued to play in the VFL, switching to play for the Casey Scorpions in 2010.
