= Kasey Green =

Australian rules footballer, born 1979

Personal information
- Full name: Kasey Raymond Green
- Born: 10 September 1979 (age 47)
- Original team: Hale School
- Height: 187 cm (6 ft 2 in)
- Weight: 84 kg (185 lb)
- Position: Defender

Playing career^{1}
Years	Club	Games (Goals)
2000–05	West Coast	54 (8)
2006–07	Kangaroos	36 (22)
Total		90 (30)
- ^{1} Playing statistics correct to the end of 2010.

Career highlights
- East Fremantle Football Club best and fairest 2005

Kasey Green (born 10 September 1979) is a former Australian rules footballer who played with the West Coast Eagles and the Kangaroos in the Australian Football League (AFL), as well as with the East Fremantle Football Club in the West Australian Football League (WAFL).

Debuting with the West Coast Eagles in 2000, Green was used as a utility/defender and was always on the fringes of selection. He played just six games in each of his first two seasons, before having a solid year in 2003 where he managed to hold his spot in the side. In 2004 he played the first seven games before being suspended for four weeks for kicking Cameron Bruce. Green never returned to the side for 2004 after serving the suspension, and finally returned more than a year and a half later, in Round 20, 2005. He kept his spot for Round 21 on the back of a solid two-goal performance but was again dropped. He was recalled for his third game of the year in the Grand Final, which was to be his last game for the Eagles, but impressed a lot with his good shut down job on Sydney's Ryan O'Keefe.

In the 2005 AFL draft, Green was selected by the Kangaroos after being delisted by the Eagles. Green was a consistent player in 2006 for the Roos, managing to play all 22 games, mainly across in the midfield/half-back line with some occasional stints in the forward line. He was never much of a major ball winner at the Kangaroos, although Green showed the Roos faithful just how much of a booming running kick for goal he had, as shown by good examples against Hawthorn in round 6 and Collingwood in round 22.

On 27 September 2007, he announced his retirement from the AFL and returned to captain East Fremantle in the WAFL. He retired at the end of the 2010 season.
