= Craig Jacotine =

Australian rules footballer, born 1980

Personal information
- Born: 21 June 1980 (age 46)
- Original team: Springvale/Dandenong U18
- Debut: Round 5, 25 April 1999, Collingwood vs. Essendon, at Melbourne Cricket Ground

Playing career^{1}
Years	Club	Games (Goals)
1999–2000	Collingwood	16 (6)
- ^{1} Playing statistics correct to the end of 2000.

Craig Jacotine (born 21 June 1980) is a former Australian rules footballer who played in the Australian Football League

Jacotine was an unlucky player considering his credentials. He wasn't picked up until no.41 in the 1998 AFL draft, when people thought he would have been picked up at a younger age the year before. He captained the Vic Metro U18 side in 1998, and played at U18 level in the TAC Cup for 2 seasons with Dandenong. He made his debut with Collingwood on ANZAC Day against the Bombers in the traditional blockbuster. He started off well in his debut season, and was regarded early on as a future leader by captain Nathan Buckley. His form went down-hill in 1999 after stringing most of the season together since his first game. In 2000 he would only play 2 games, spending most of his season at Williamstown after he was outed by injury. He was delisted at the end of the year.

He was born to Sri Lankan Burgher parents.
