= Beau Dowler =

Australian rules footballer (born 1987)

Personal information
- Born: 16 December 1987 (age 38)
- Original team: Oakleigh Chargers
- Draft: No. 6, 2005 national draft
- Debut: Round 18, 2006, Hawthorn vs. Fremantle, at Subiaco Oval
- Height: 196 cm (6 ft 5 in)
- Weight: 88 kg (194 lb)

Playing career^{1}
Years	Club	Games (Goals)
2006–2009	Hawthorn	16 (11)
- ^{1} Playing statistics correct to the end of 2009.

Career highlights
- TAC Cup Team of the Year: 2005; U/18 All Australian: 2005

Beau Dowler (born 16 December 1987) is a former Australian rules football player who played with the Hawthorn Football Club in the Australian Football League.

He was originally from the Noble Park Football Club and then recruited from the TAC Cup side, Oakleigh Chargers in the U/18 competition. He played for Vic Metro, in the Teal Cup Championships and was named All-Australian. Dowler was selected by Hawthorn with the 6th pick in the 2005 AFL draft, despite being in a car accident in October 2005 in which he suffered a fractured pelvis. The injury restricted his first season but managed to debut for two games late in the 2006 season.

His first game for 2007 came in round 17 against Kangaroos at Launceston's Aurora Stadium. Beau Dowler replaced Mitch Thorp, who had tightness in his calf after Friday's practice match. He finished with eight disposals, including two goals. Dowler was dropped the following week when Lance Franklin returned from injury.

He managed to string a series of games in 2009 and was listed as one of Hawthorns best in his sixth game. After failing to play a senior game in 2010, Dowler was delisted at the end of the season.

Dowler signed for VFL Club Sandringham on 4-11-2011 and was announced as the club's captain for the 2012 season.

== Statistics ==
Legend
G	Goals	K	Kicks	D	Disposals	T	Tackles
B	Behinds	H	Handballs	M	Marks

Season	Team	No.	Games	Totals							Averages (per game)							Votes
Season	Team	No.	Games	G	B	K	H	D	M	T	G	B	K	H	D	M	T	Votes
2006	Hawthorn	34	2	0	1	3	3	6	2	5	0.0	0.5	1.5	1.5	3.0	1.0	2.5	0
2007	Hawthorn	16	1	2	1	5	3	8	5	2	2.0	1.0	5.0	3.0	8.0	5.0	2.0	0
2008	Hawthorn	16	0	—	—	—	—	—	—	—	—	—	—	—	—	—	—	0
2009	Hawthorn	16	13	9	5	107	82	189	65	32	0.7	0.4	8.2	6.3	14.5	5.0	2.5	0
2010	Hawthorn	16	0	—	—	—	—	—	—	—	—	—	—	—	—	—	—	0
Career			16	11	7	115	88	203	115	39	0.7	0.4	7.2	5.5	12.7	7.2	2.4	0
