= Shane Wakelin =

Australian rules footballer, born 1974

Personal information
- Full name: Shane Wakelin
- Born: 12 August 1974 (age 52); Whyalla, South Australia
- Original team: Port Adelaide (SANFL)
- Height: 191 cm (6 ft 3 in)
- Weight: 92 kg (203 lb)

Playing career
Years	Club	Games (Goals)
1993	Port Adelaide (SANFL)	3 (0)
1994–2000	St Kilda	94 (19)
2001–2008	Collingwood	158 (1)
Total		252 (20)

Career highlights
- St Kilda pre-season premiership: 1996; Gavin Brown Award: 2005; AFL Rising Star nominee: 1994

Shane Wakelin (born 12 August 1974) is a retired professional Australian rules footballer who played for the St Kilda Football Club and the Collingwood Football Club in the Australian Football League (AFL).

== Early life ==
Wakelin was born in Whyalla, South Australia, on 12 August 1974, a few minutes after his identical twin brother Darryl, who was born just before midnight on 11 August. When Wakelin was six months old his family moved to Kimba, South Australia, where his father farmed sheep. Wakelin was 13 when he moved to Port Lincoln, South Australia. At 16 he and his brother were recruited by South Australian National Football League (SANFL) club Port Adelaide and they made the move to Adelaide.

== AFL career ==
Recruited from Port Adelaide by St Kilda in the 1992 AFL draft, Wakelin debuted in the Australian Football League (AFL) in 1994. He became noted as a hard-working defender at St Kilda and, during the mid to late 1990s, was part of a defensive combination with his twin brother Darryl which was considered very effective.

Wakelin played in 5 of 22 matches in the 1997 AFL season home and away rounds in which St Kilda qualified in first position for the 1997 AFL finals series, winning the club's second minor premiership and first McClelland Trophy.

After playing only four games in 2000 he became disgruntled with St Kilda and was later picked up by Collingwood Football Club, where he reignited his career and continued his trademark consistency as a defender.

Wakelin signed on for the 2007 AFL season knowing he would probably spend much time in the reserves. Due to injuries to other Collingwood backmen, however, he was often selected and was crucial in defence for Collingwood during that year. For the 2008 AFL season, due to the sudden retirement of fellow Collingwood backman James Clement, Wakelin agreed to another season for the Magpies.

At the end of the 2008 season he retired after Collingwood's loss in the semi-final against St Kilda ended the team's season.

In 2003, Wakelin appeared on a shampoo commercial for Sunsilk Base Elements, which also featured fellow Collingwood players Chris Tarrant (footballer) and Richard Cole. This wooden performance earned him the "Tool of the Year" on AFL variety show Before the Game.

== Environmental activism ==
Wakelin is a strong supporter of sustainable transport and famously sold his car in 2007 for environmental reasons, using public transport and bicycles as an alternative, even to travel to football matches he was playing in. On 5 June 2012, he took part in a stunt for Melbourne radio station Gold FM's breakfast program which involved a competition to see which mode of transport would get someone from Nunawading railway station to the Gold FM studio in Richmond in the shortest time. Wakelin took the train and won the competition, completing the journey in 41 minutes. The motorist took 49 minutes, with the bike rider taking 53 minutes.

== Personal life ==
Wakelin married Ligita in 2003 and they have two children – daughter Charley Elizabeth and son Tom Leo.

Wakelin was one of the four St Kilda players featured at the start of the 1995 music video "Greg! The Stop Sign!!" by Australian band TISM.
