= Michael Rix =

Australian rules footballer

Personal information
- Born: 8 January 1981 (age 45)
- Original team: Box Hill / Coburg
- Debut: Round 11, 10 June 2006, St Kilda vs. Sydney Swans, at SCG
- Height: 198 cm (6 ft 6 in)
- Weight: 100 kg (220 lb)

Playing career^{1}
Years	Club	Games (Goals)
2006–2008	St Kilda	29 (3)
- ^{1} Playing statistics correct to the end of 2008.

Michael Rix (born 8 January 1981) is a former professional Australian rules footballer who played for the St Kilda Football Club in the Australian Football League (AFL).

Originally rookie listed with Hawthorn for the 2004 season, Rix did not play a game for the club but continued to be an important ruckman in the Victorian Football League (VFL) with the Box Hill Hawks. He then moved to the Coburg Tigers in 2005, showing continued form.

This form saw him recruited as the number 49 draft pick in the 2005 AFL draft from Coburg to the St Kilda Football Club, a side that had problems in the ruck department with usual second-stringers Cain Ackland and Jason Blake shouldering huge responsibility.

A mature age recruit at 25, Rix was drafted in a bid to improve St Kilda's ruck stocks; however, it was not until Round 11 his first season in 2006 when he made his debut against the Sydney Swans. He played a tough game in wet conditions, considered not ideal for a ruckman (however, he kicked a goal with his first kick in the AFL).

Rix then went on to play 11 matches in his first season, being used occasionally at centre-half back when required. He played in the losing Elimination Final against Melbourne in 2006.

Rix started the 2007 season as a back-up ruckman to new recruits Matthew Clarke and Michael Gardiner. However, he ended up playing 17 games. Despite only one game in 2008, he was one of the better performed players with St Kilda's affiliate team Casey Scorpions and passed 100 games at VFL level.

Rix was delisted from St Kilda at the end of the 2008 season and played four seasons with Subiaco before retiring.

Rix currently resides in the United States, where he spends his time writing love letters for friends, befriending local celebrities and captaining an exclusive run club, West Village Athletic.
