= Jason Quigley =

Australian rules football umpire

Jason Quigley is an Australian rules football field umpire in the Australian Football League. He has umpired 48 career games in the AFL.
