= Adam Davis (umpire) =

Australian rules football field umpire

Adam Davis is a former Australian rules football field umpire in the Australian Football League. He has umpired 39 career games in the AFL at the completion of Week 1 of the finals for the 2006 AFL season.

Davis won the 2003 Umpire of the Year award for the AFL Queensland Umpires Association.

Players were officially warned about bumping into umpires after Brisbane Lions captain Michael Voss shoved Carlton captain Anthony Koutoufides into Davis during the 2005 AFL season. This resparking an extended debate about the protection of umpires in the AFL.
