= Stefan Grun =

Australian rules football field umpire

Stefan Grun is a former Australian rules football field umpire in the Australian Football League. He retired during the 2012 AFL season after having umpired 107 AFL matches and was elected President of the AFL Umpires Association in 2013.

Grun was one of two umpires injured during Round 6, 2004, which was the round that re-sparked debate about umpire-player collisions. Umpires had always been protected, with harsh suspensions handed down to players who collide with them. This incident demonstrated a change in interpretation of the AFL rules by the judiciary.

Grun has had a number of player collisions and explained his most embarrassing moment in umpiring was "Getting smashed by Charlie Gardiner at Kardinia Park in just my third game was quite bad, especially when the newspaper ran a photo of me lying on the ground looking like a curled up dog."
