= Cleve Hughes =

Australian rules footballer

Personal information
- Full name: Cleve Hughes
- Born: 15 January 1987 (age 39); South Australia
- Original team: Norwood
- Height: 193 cm (6 ft 4 in)
- Weight: 93 kg (205 lb)
- Position: Centre half forward/full forward

Playing career^{1}
Years	Club	Games (Goals)
2006–2009	Richmond	16 (23)
- ^{1} Playing statistics correct to the end of 2009.

Cleve Hughes (born 15 January 1987) is a former professional Australian rules footballer who played for the Richmond Football Club in the Australian Football League (AFL).

Hughes was drafted by Richmond at pick 24 from South Australian National Football League (SANFL) club Norwood in the 2005 national draft.

== 2007 season ==
Hughes played a handful of senior games in 2007 with a highlight being his three-goal effort against reigning premiers West Coast Eagles in a 21-point loss. He also managed to score three goals in the round 6 match against Geelong, however the Tigers were thrashed by 157 points on the day.

== 2008 season ==
If there was any indication Hughes would be the future replacement for Matthew Richardson it was in the Tigers round 13 clash against Port Adelaide at AAMI Stadium. After playing consistent football in the Victorian Football League (VFL), scoring multiple bags of goals, Hughes got his chance for Richmond booting six goals in the Tigers four point win.

== AFLQ/NEAFL ==
After being delisted by Richmond, Hughes joined Queensland Australian Football League (QAFL) team Southport in 2010. He won the NEAFL leading goal kicker award on two occasions. 2010 with Southport and 2014 with Redland.

== Other ==
Hughes was also an exceptional cricket player in his youth, having made the Australian Under-17 development side in 2003/04 as right arm fast bowler. His district cricket club in South Australia was Kensington Cricket Club.

Hughes is also currently modeling for Viviens Model Management in Melbourne and Sydney. He is signed internationally with Promod in Germany.
