= Greg Bentley =

Australian rules footballer

Personal information
- Full name: Gregory Bentley
- Born: 9 April 1987 (age 39)
- Original teams: Rosebud; Dandenong Stingrays
- Debut: Round 19, 12 August 2006, Port Adelaide vs. Western Bulldogs, at Marrara Oval
- Height: 187 cm (6 ft 2 in)
- Weight: 83 kg (183 lb)

Playing career^{1}
Years	Club	Games (Goals)
2006–2008	Port Adelaide	21 (6)
2009	Carlton	5 (2)
Total		26 (8)
- ^{1} Playing statistics correct to the end of 2009.

Gregory Bentley (born 9 April 1987) is an Australian rules footballer who played for the Port Adelaide Football Club and Carlton Football Club in the Australian Football League (AFL).

Recruited from Rosebud and the Dandenong Stingrays, he was placed on the Port Adelaide's rookie list but was upgraded to the senior list during 2006. Bentley played his first AFL game on 12 August 2006 against the Western Bulldogs in Darwin and kicked his first AFL goal with his first kick. He was allocated to Sturt in the South Australian National Football League (SANFL) when not selected for Port Adelaide.

Bentley was delisted by Port Adelaide at the end of 2008 after twenty-one games with the club. He was drafted as a rookie by the Carlton with its third selection (#37 overall) in the 2009 AFL rookie draft. He made his Carlton debut in Round 6, and played five games for the season, before being delisted at the end of the season.

Bentley made a return to local football in 2010 returning to his old home club, Rosebud, in the Mornington Peninsula Nepean Football League, and in 2011 he was the joint-winner of the George Osborne Medal as the Nepean division best and fairest.
