= Ryan Lonie =

Australian rules footballer, born 1983

Personal information
- Full name: Ryan Lonie
- Born: 4 March 1983 (age 43); Frankston, Victoria
- Original team: Frankston Bombers / Dandenong Stingrays
- Height: 190 cm (6 ft 3 in)
- Weight: 87 kg (192 lb)

Playing career^{1}
Years	Club	Games (Goals)
2001–2008	Collingwood	123 (61)
- ^{1} Playing statistics correct to the end of 2008.

Career highlights
- 2001 AFL Rising Star nominee; Harry Collier Trophy 2001

Ryan Lonie (born 4 March 1983) is a former Collingwood footballer in the Australian Football League.

== AFL career ==
=== Early career (2001 - 2002) ===
Lonie starred as a junior footballer with his twin brother Nathan (Hawthorn, then Port Adelaide) playing for the Frankston Rovers Junior Football Club. He had a raking left boot and superb pace and run on the football field that made the crowd rise to the occasion when he got the ball in space. Lonie played for the MPNFL club Frankston Bombers, before playing in the TAC Cup for the Dandenong Stingrays. He was snapped up in the 3rd round of the 2000 AFL draft at number 34. He made his debut for the club in round one of season 2001 against Hawthorn. Called up as a late replacement for an injured James Clement, Lonie was one of the Pies' finest in the four-point loss. He quickly established himself as a crowd favourite, with his long, daring dashes through the midfield to within goal scoring range on his raking left boot, epitomised by his two goals in the Anzac Day clash with Essendon in round five, only days after receiving an AFL Rising Star nomination for his performance against Richmond. Lonie managed to play the first 21 matches of the season, and was only absent for the round 22 victory over the Kangaroos due to a shoulder injury. His performances saw his name bandied around as a favourite to win the AFL Rising Star Award, though St Kilda's Justin Koschitzke proved a worthy winner.

The following season saw Lonie struggle with the dreaded osteitis pubis and second-year blues, as the Magpies charged towards their first finals appearance since 1994. He managed 18 games, and began slowly, spending plenty of time with VFL affiliate Williamstown. However, Lonie bolstered his stocks with a stunning finals performance, which saw him return to his hard running, rebounding form, his ability to meet a challenge head on a feature of the Magpies' September. The Qualifying Final upset over Port Adelaide had much to do with Lonie's audacity - two goals from long range helping keep the Power at bay. It was Lonie's line-breaking run and searching left foot which hit the leading Anthony Rocca midway through the third term of the Preliminary Final against Adelaide, which paved the way for Rocca's now famous 75m goal. He was also one of the Magpies' best performers in the Grand Final against the Brisbane Lions from the wing, opposed to Nigel Lappin.

=== Career high (2003 - 2004) ===
In 2003, Lonie did not miss a game, playing all 25 games of the season, which saw the Pies reach the Grand Final once again, though again missing out on the ultimate prize, receiving a 50-point trouncing at the hands of the Brisbane Lions. Lonie's personal form was average at best, his run from defence becoming less frequent, as his impact upon matches continued to dwindle. His loss of form was highlighted in the final two weeks of the season, when he produced no more than 5 touches in either the Preliminary or Grand Finals. 2004 heralded a move from Lonie's traditional number 37 guernsey into Mark Richardson's old number three. He once again played all games for the season, though his form remained solid if not spectacular, as the Magpies crashed back to earth. Late in the season, Lonie was thrust into attack, where he prospered for a short while, with three goals scored against Port Adelaide under the MCG lights in another loss in round 21.

=== Later career (2005 - 2008) ===
Lonie's 2005 was perhaps his most disappointing season at the club; he managed only 10 games and spent the majority of the first half of the season with Williamstown. His omission after round two cut his remarkable string of 59 matches in succession spent in the senior side. He found his way back into the side midseason, and enjoyed a good patch in the seniors. This was vital, as his future at the club was at stake. He suffered a minor knee injury against Fremantle in round 18, but reappeared in the final match of the year against the Western Bulldogs at Telstra Dome.

He survived the cull, and rebounded in impressive fashion, playing all 23 matches in 2006, though his trademark run and carry from defence had dried up somewhat, Lonie then acting as a linkman between the ball carriers. 2007 was a year the boy from Frankston would rather forget, playing only four games as osteitis pubis again took its toll. At the end of Collingwood's 2008 season Lonie retired at the age of 25.

== See also ==
- Collingwood Football Club roster 2006
