= Travis Baird =

Australian rules football player

Personal information
- Born: 25 July 1986 (age 40)
- Original team: Donald / Bendigo U18
- Debut: Round 19, 2005, Brisbane Lions vs. Hawthorn, at the Gabba
- Height: 193 cm (6 ft 4 in)
- Weight: 89 kg (196 lb)

Playing career^{1}
Years	Club	Games (Goals)
2005	Brisbane Lions	2 (1)
2006	Western Bulldogs	3 (4)
Total		5 (5)
- ^{1} Playing statistics correct to the end of 2006.

Travis Baird (born 25 July 1986) is an Australian rules football player who was drafted by the Western Bulldogs from the Brisbane Lions in the 2005 AFL draft (3rd round, number 46 overall). He played 3 games with the Bulldogs, and played 2 games with Brisbane in 2005.

== Overview ==
Baird was destined to spend the rest of 2006 on Brisbane's rookie list, and thus took the decision to enter the draft at the end of 2005. He played most of 2005 with the Suncoast Lions in the AFLQ as a midfielder, showing enough ability to be promoted to Brisbane's senior list in the second half of the season, where he played two senior games.

Following the 2007 AFL season Baird was delisted by the Western Bulldogs, after he was unable to secure a single senior game for the year.
