= Ryan Jackson (Australian footballer) =

Australian rules footballer

Personal information
- Full name: Ryan Jackson
- Born: 4 April 1987 (age 39)
- Original team: Northern Knights
- Draft: 1st selection, 2006 rookie draft
- Height: 188 cm (6 ft 2 in)
- Weight: 81 kg (179 lb)
- Position: Utility

Playing career^{1}
Years	Club	Games (Goals)
2006–2008	Carlton	9 (3)
- ^{1} Playing statistics correct to the end of 2008.

Ryan Jackson (born 4 April 1987) is an Australian rules footballer who played for Carlton in the Australian Football League (AFL) between 2006 and 2008.

== Junior career ==
Jackson began his football career at the Hurstbridge Junior Football Club, then moving to the Greensborough Junior Football Club, before playing under-18s football with the Northern Knights, where he was club captain in 2005. Jackson nominated for the 2005 AFL draft, but was not selected. He was subsequently taken as a rookie by Carlton (number one overall) in the 2006 Rookie Draft.

== AFL career ==
He began playing for Carlton's VFL-affiliate, the Northern Bullants, in its reserves team, before winning a regular Bullants senior position in round 9 against Tasmania, with limited ground-time at first. Within three weeks, he had cemented himself in the team. He was elevated from the rookie list late in the season, and played his first game for Carlton in the final game of the 2006 AFL season against Sydney. However, the 12–10 rule pushed him back into the Bullants' reserves during the Victorian Football League (VFL) finals. He began the 2007 season back on the rookie list, however he was elevated again early in the season as a replacement for Shaun Grigg. He played seven games, including a 23 possession game against St Kilda in round 17 playing on champion midfielder Robert Harvey. Jackson was rewarded for his hard work and promising efforts in 2007 by being placed on the senior list for 2008. Jackson played the first game of 2008 but did not play again during the year and was delisted at the end of season.

In 2009, Jackson played for Claremont in the West Australian Football League (WAFL). In 2010, he moved back to Victoria and played for Box Hill in the Victorian Football League (VFL), and remained there until the end of 2011. From 2012 until 2019, he played with Montmorency in the Northern Football League, captaining his club since 2013 and captaining the NFL representative team in 2014. He was to play for Sunshine in the Western Region Football League in the cancelled 2020 season, and will play for AFL Outer East club Wandin in 2021.
