= Ed Lower =

Australian rules footballer

Personal information
- Full name: Edward Lower
- Born: 23 June 1987 (age 39); Adelaide
- Original team: Norwood (SANFL)
- Height: 187 cm (6 ft 2 in)
- Weight: 80 kg (176 lb)

Playing career^{1}
Years	Club	Games (Goals)
2006–2010	North Melbourne	42 (16)
- ^{1} Playing statistics correct to the end of 2010.

Edward Lower (born 23 June 1987) is a former Australian rules football player in the Australian Football League, for the North Melbourne Football Club. He was a contestant on Big Brother Australia in 2013.

Lower was a defensive player, regarded as medium-sized, who attacked the ball with speed and agility. He played as a defensive forward, shutting down the oppositions best rebounders, as a small defender and was also utilised as a run-with player through the midfield. He played for SANFL club Norwood in 2005. He was picked in the first round of the 2005 NAB AFL Rookie Draft at pick number 10 overall by the Kangaroos.

Lower attended Saint Ignatius' College, Adelaide before moving to Prince Alfred College with twin brother Nicholas, who finished his AFL career with the Western Bulldogs. He was a contestant in Big Brother Australia 2013.
