= Jason Roe =

Australian rules footballer (born 1984)

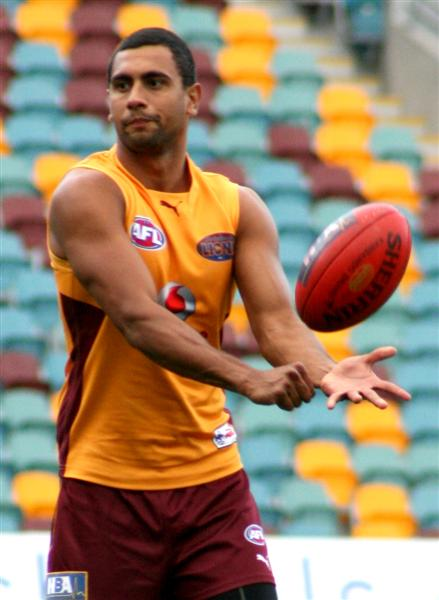
- Roe at a Brisbane Lions training session in 2008

Personal information
- Full name: Jason Roe
- Born: 13 March 1984 (age 42); Northern Territory
- Original team: Cairns City Cobras
- Draft: 6th overall, 2005 Rookie draft Brisbane Lions
- Height: 192 cm (6 ft 4 in)
- Weight: 84 kg (185 lb)
- Position: Defender

Playing career^{1}
Years	Club	Games (Goals)
2003	Collingwood	0 (0)
2006–2009	Brisbane Lions	50 (7)
- ^{1} Playing statistics correct to the end of 2009.

Jason Roe (born 13 March 1984) is an indigenous and former Australian rules football player for the Brisbane Lions in the Australian Football League (AFL).

Originally playing for Nightcliff Football Club in the Northern Territory Football League (NTFL), then the Cairns City Cobras in the 2001–2002 seasons, Roe was selected in the 2002 rookie draft by the Collingwood Football Club and placed on its rookie list. He was delisted at the end of 2003 having not played an AFL game, and moved to South Australian National Football League (SANFL) club North Adelaide.

He was given a second chance at AFL level and was placed on the Brisbane Lions rookie list in the 2006 rookie draft.

Roe was delisted by Brisbane following the 2009 season, after playing 50 AFL games.

== Drug Scandal ==
In June 2015, Roe was released on bail after being charged of possession and supply of 750 grams (26.45 Ounces) of cannabis and was facing two charges of possession and supply of the drug. The value was deemed to be worth $75,000 AUD if it were sold in a remote community.
