= Jeremy Humm =

Australian rules footballer

Personal information
- Born: 5 January 1983 (age 43)
- Original team: North Ballarat (TAC Cup)
- Height: 180 cm (5 ft 11 in)
- Weight: 79 kg (174 lb)

Playing career^{1}
Years	Club	Games (Goals)
2001–2004	West Coast	22 (1)
2006	Richmond	1 (0)
Total		23 (1)
- ^{1} Playing statistics correct to the end of 2006.

Jeremy Humm (born 5 January 1983) is a former Australian rules footballer who played with West Coast and Richmond. A tough half-back who came from the highly productive North Ballarat club, he played four games in his debut season. With limited opportunities, he played few games in 2002, although he earned a spot on the team for the finals. With an unexpectedly small 8 games during the 2003 season and a poor start to 2004, he played most of the year in the West Australian Football League. In 2006 he moved to Richmond. He played 1 game for the Tigers and He was not picked again in 2006 and he has made no further appearances in the AFL. In 2012 he won the Hayward Medal as the Best and Fairest Player in the South West Football League, playing for the Augusta-Margaret River Hawks.

In 2015, he joined the Boston Demons football club in Massachusetts USA, where he currently oversees training as a playing coach and helps develop young US talent.

== Sources ==
- Holmesby, Russell & Main, Jim (2007). The Encyclopedia of AFL Footballers. 7th ed. Melbourne: Bas Publishing.
