= Nathan Lonie =

Australian rules footballer

Personal information
- Born: 4 March 1983 (age 43); Frankston, Victoria
- Original team: Frankston Bombers / Dandenong Stingrays
- Debut: Round 11, 2001, Hawthorn vs. Geelong, at Colonial Stadium
- Height: 189 cm (6 ft 2 in)
- Weight: 84 kg (185 lb)

Playing career^{1}
Years	Club	Games (Goals)
2001–2005	Hawthorn	64 (35)
2006–2008	Port Adelaide	40 (16)
Total		104 (51)
- ^{1} Playing statistics correct to the end of 2008.

Nathan Lonie (born 4 March 1983) is a former Australian rules footballer in the Australian Football League.

The identical twin brother of Collingwood player Ryan Lonie, the two Lonies not only share identical looks but share very similar footballing characteristics - possessing long kicking abilities (over 55 metres) and playing a "receiver" role relying on uncontested possessions across the half-back line.

== AFL career ==
=== Hawthorn career (2001-2005) ===
He debuted with the Hawthorn Football Club midway through the 2001 season, but was not recalled til Round 20, where he then held his spot for the finals series.

=== Port Adelaide career (2006-2008) ===
After 64 games with the Hawks, Lonie was traded to Port Adelaide at the end of the 2005 season, where he became a regular first-team player. He was dropped after Round 20, 2007, for the rest of the season but came close to replacing Michael Wilson but lost his chance to Brad Symes for Port Adelaide's 2007 grand final loss. He retired at the end of the 2008 season.
