= Richie Cole (footballer) =

Australian rules footballer

Richard Cole
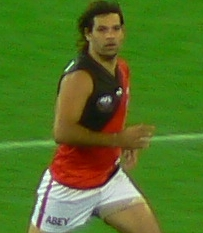

Personal information
- Born: 15 July 1983 (age 43)
- Original team: Pioneers (NT) / Eastern Ranges (TAC Cup)
- Debut: Round 1, 28 March 2002, Collingwood vs. Richmond, at the MCG
- Height: 186 cm (6 ft 1 in)
- Weight: 102 kg (225 lb)

Playing career^{1}
Years	Club	Games (Goals)
2002–2005	Collingwood	56 (6)
2006–2007	Essendon	7 (0)
Total		63 (6)
- ^{1} Playing statistics correct to the end of 2007.

Career highlights
- AFL Rising Star nominee 2003

Richard Cole (born 15 July 1983) is a former Australian rules footballer for the Collingwood and Essendon Football Clubs in the Australian Football League.

Cole was a half-back flanker and was drafted by Collingwood at pick 11 of the 2001 national draft. 2004 was the best season in his AFL career, in which he played every game and finished sixth in Collingwood's best and fairest. He played a total of 56 games for the Magpies.

Essendon acquired Cole via trade at the end of the 2005 season. He made a total of 7 AFL appearances for the Bombers and was delisted at the end of the 2007 season. He is now a part of the Buffaloes Football Club (NT).
