= List of Australian Football League umpires =

This is a list of people who have umpired in the Australian Football League (AFL), formerly the VFL.

As of 2007, there have been a total of 1,249 umpires to have umpired at VFL/AFL Level (408 field umpires, 523 boundary umpires and 318 goal umpires). The first field umpire to be appointed to a match was Henry "Ivo" Crapp, the first boundary umpire was Chris Carriss, and the first goal umpire was F. J. Burton.

Field umpire statistics are correct to round 10, 2026
Goal and boundary umpire statistics are correct to the end of 2025

== Active AFL umpires ==
Umpire	Position	Debut year	Games	Finals	Grand Finals
Brett Rosebury	Field	2000	570	57	9
Simon Meredith	Field	2004	539	57	9
Matt Stevic	Field	2004	525	63	12
Mathew Nicholls	Field	2003	457	29	2
Ian Burrows	Boundary	2003	439	50	10
Adam Coote	Boundary	2003	431	31	5
Nathan Doig	Boundary	2005	415	34	5
Jacob Mollison	Field	2008	397	15	2
Michael Marantelli	Boundary	2011	359	39	7
Adam Wojcik	Goal	2008	335	39	6
Matthew Tomkins	Boundary	2012	330	38	6
Chelsea Roffey	Goal	2004	326	16	1
Matthew Konetschka	Boundary	2012	314	37	7
Matthew Jenkinson	Boundary	2012	302	13	0
Brendan Hosking	Field	2012	300	11	1
Chris Bull	Boundary	2011	299	17	1
Stephen Williams	Goal	2009	286		2
Nick Foot	Field	2012	274	12	1
Leigh Fisher	Field	2013	271	1	0
Andrew Stephens	Field	2014	269	17	1
Craig Fleer	Field	2012	263	12	2
Chris Esler	Boundary	2012	259	11	0
Brett Rogers	Goal	2009	240	5	0
Robert O'Gorman	Field	2014	239	2	0
Daniel Field-Read	Boundary	2015	229	13	2
Nathan Williamson	Field	2017	227	11	0
Josh Mather	Boundary	2014	226	9	0
Jordan Andrews	Boundary	2015	219	4	0
Curtis Deboy	Field	2014	217	12	0
Hayden Meyer	Field	2017	209	13	2
Matthew Dervan	Goal	2016	205	29	4
Michael Craig	Goal	2014	199	9	1
Steven Piperno	Goal	2015	198	17	3
Ben Macdonald	Boundary	2017	196	12	1
Brody Kenny-Bell	Goal	2015	192	9	0
Damien Main	Boundary	2017	192	16	1
Peter Challen	Goal	2007	182	3	0
Josh Garrett	Boundary	2016	182	2	0
Lachlan Rayner	Boundary	2016	176	3	0
Nick Brown	Field	2015	174	0	0
Angus McKenzie-Wills	Goal	2016	174	12	1
Brent Wallace	Field	2015	174	2	0
Michael Barlow	Boundary	2018	167	15	4
Andre Gianfagna	Field	2018	159	6	0
Michael Baker	Boundary	2017	156	0	0
Adam Reardon	Boundary	2018	153	1	0
Sam Walsh	Goal	2018	150	13	2
Alex Whetton	Field	2018	149	0	0
Chris Delany	Boundary	2018	148	0	0
Dylan Benwell	Goal	2017	147	4	0
John Howorth	Field	2019	145	0	0
Justin Power	Field	2019	143	1	0
Patrick Dineen	Boundary	2018	140	1	0
Cameron Dore	Field	2019	136	1	0
Jamie Broadbent	Field	2019	135	4	0
Josh Furman	Boundary	2019	134	6	0
Nick Swanson	Boundary	2019	131	1	0
Sean Moylan	Boundary	2018	130	1	0
Matthew Maclure	Goal	2017	125	5	0
Sam Stagg	Boundary	2020	122	1	0
David Rodan	Goal	2017	119	0	0
Andrew Heffernan	Field	2019	113	0	0
Daniel Johanson	Field	2019	111	0	0
Eleni Tee	Field	2017	108	0	0
Alex Chisholm	Goal	2018	102	1	0
Sally Boud	Goal	2016	100	0	0
Nathan Toner	Field	2021	99	0	0
David Wood	Boundary	2020	98	0	0
Kieran Ferguson	Boundary	2021	96	0	0
Paul Rebeschini	Field	2020	94	0	0
Matthew Bridges	Goal	2020	91	1	0
Sam Hunter	Goal	2020	90	3	0
Jordan Russell	Boundary	2022	89	7	0
Nick Phillips	Boundary	2022	88	4	0
Simon Plumridge	Goal	2020	88	0	0
Simon Blight	Boundary	2022	80	0	0
Martin Rodger	Field	2023	80	0	0
Ben Fely	Boundary	2022	74	3	0
Tom Sullivan	Goal	2022	70	4	0
Nicholas McGinness	Field	2022	68	0	0
Ty Duncan	Boundary	2022	65	0	0
Rhys Negerman	Goal	2022	60	0	0
Andrew Adair	Field	2023	58	0	0
Callum Leonard	Goal	2021	58	0	0
Peter Bailes	Field	2023	57	0	0
Cameron Jones	Field	2023	50	0	0
Blake Anderson	Boundary	2023	45	0	0
Tom Bryce	Field	2021	45	0	0
Matthew Young	Field	2023	45	0	0
Jason Yazdani	Goal	2022	44	0	0
Will Morris	Boundary	2023	43	0	0
Harrison Birch	Field	2023	41	0	0
Luke Graves	Boundary	2024	38	0	0
Taylor Mattioli	Goal	2023	38	0	0
Jordan Fry	Field	2021	37	0	0
Nick Jankovskis	Field	2021	31	0	0
Jaco Jansen van Rensberg	Boundary	2025	23	0	0
Lachlan Menara	Boundary	2025	22	0	0
Ben Williams	Boundary	2025	21	0	0
John Cooper	Boundary	2025	17	0	0
Adrian Pretorius	Boundary	2025	12	0	0
Jack Howard	Field	2025	10	0	0
Luke Monea	Goal	2025	9	0	0
Braden Ford	Goal	2025	8	0	0
Zachary Mousaco	Boundary	2025	8	0	0
Joel Clamp	Field	2026	7	0	0
Harrison Bell	Boundary	2025	6	0	0
Anthony Laughton	Boundary	2025	6	0	0
Joseph O'Brien	Field	2026	3	0	0
Jordyn Pearson	Field	2026	2	0	0
Kaitlin Barr	Boundary	2025	1	0	0
Greta Miller	Boundary	2025	1	0	0
Melissa Sambrooks	Boundary	2025	1	0	0
Georgia Henderson	Goal	—N/a	0	0	0
Emilie Hill	Goal	—N/a	0	0	0
Sam Morgan	Field	—N/a	0	0	0
James Rizio	Goal	—N/a	0	0	0

== VFL/AFL umpires to have umpired 250+ games ==
Denotes current umpire

Umpire	Seasons	Games	Finals	Grand Finals
Brett Rosebury	2000–	570	57	9
Simon Meredith	2004–	539	55	10
Matt Stevic	2004–	473	57	11
Shane McInerney	1994–2019	500	26	2
Hayden Kennedy	1988–2011	495	39	5
Mathew Nicholls	2003–	457	29	2
Rowan Sawers	1977–1997	406	35	4
Chris Donlon	2005–2024	426	20	1
Stephen McBurney	1995–2013	401	30	4
Jacob Mollison	2008–	397	15	2
Ray Chamberlain	2004–2024	389	31	3
Rob Findlay	2009–2025	381	17	1
Dean Margetts	2002–2021	377	12	0
Darren Goldspink	1989–2007	371	37	6
Bryan Sheehan	1986–2003	367	37	6
Scott McLaren	1994–2010	364	34	5
Justin Schmitt	1997–2018	364	15	0
Shaun Ryan	2003–2020	349	41	8
Brett Allen	1992–2007	347	37	7
Ian Robinson	1971–1987	344	35	9
Chris Mitchell	1981–2002	341	15	0
Stuart Wenn	1995–2014	340	5	0
Scott Jeffery	2001–2018	325	13	1
Peter Carey	1985–1999	307	24	4
Jack McMurray Sr.	1917–1936	304	23	5
Peter Cameron	1977–1993	304	19	3
Gavin Dore	1986–2004	302	17	1
Brendan Hosking	2012–	300	11	1
David Howlett	1981–2001	300	14	1
Jack Elder	1906–1922	296	39	10
Kevin Smith	1971–1985	294	23	4
Andrew Coates	1989–2004	283	20	2
Michael Vozzo	1999–2011	280	24	2
Nick Foot	2012–	274	12	1
Leigh Fisher	2013–	273	1	0
Andrew Stephens	2014–	269	17	1
Craig Fleer	2012–	263	12	2
Denis Rich	1982–1997	251	16	3

== VFL/AFL players and umpires ==
This list is of VFL/AFL footballers who umpired at least one match in the league, either as a boundary, field or goal umpire. There have been a total of 85 players to achieve this distinction.

Name	Games umpired	Years umpired
Bert Allen	2	1915
Roy Allen	1	1931
Jordan Bannister	1+	2012–
Jimmy Bates	15	1939–1943
Tammy Beauchamp	7	1909
Wally Beckwith	22	1928–1929
Vic Belcher	17	1921–30
Albert Bickford	1	1921
Billy Blair	41	1940–1945
Max Blumfield	37	1951–1954
Jack Boyd	41	1934–1936
Bob Boyle	59	1907–1915
Billy Bremner	21	1910–1912
Billy Briscoe	51	1926–1929
Charlie Canet	7	1931
Vernon Carkeek	1	1922
Sam Chapman	160	1902–1913
Bill Coffey	33	1926–1929
Ted Collins	1	1930
Bob Corbett	40	1931–1933
Harold Craven	2	1931
Andrew Curtis	107	1996–2006
Charlie Curtis	3	1910
Jack Davidson	1	1906
Bill L. Davies	2	1914
Lawrie Delaney	9	1915–1918
Eddie Drohan	14	1909
Charlie Dummett	264	1927–1945
Percy Ellingsen	53	1931–1933
Leigh Fisher	1+	2013–
Charlie Foletta	31	1913–15
Mark Fraser	5	2005
Dick Gibson	100	1899–1909
George Green	13	1917–1920
Bill Griffiths	20	1911–1913
Ted Hall	1	1900
Charlie Hammond	11	1921
Harry Hardiman	69	1944–1948
George Hastings	8	1905–10
Clarrie Hearn	12	1937
Neville Heffernan	67	1931–1935
Hugh Heron	120	1914–1926
Arthur Hiskins	52	1930–1933
Ern Jenkins	132	1920–1927
Harold Johnston	3	1930
Percy Jory	3	1925
Pat Kennedy	76	1925–1931
Harry Lampe	1	1909
Phil Lane	26	1943–1946
Billy Leeds	2	1904
Teddy Lockwood	1	1917
Mick Madden	93	1923–1929
Vin Maguire	7	1923–1924
Dick McCabe	1	1918
Bill McNamara	3	1906–1908
Keith Millar	3	1936
Roy Millen	1	1929
Jack Monohan	181	1913–1926
Billy Moxham	25	1913–1919
Alec Mutch	47	1923–1927
Wally Naismith	11	1915–1919
Michael O'Gorman	172	1902–1919
Howard Okey	9	1936
Jack O'Loughlin	91	1904–1910
Billy Orchard	14	1923–1926
Albert Pannam	12	1914–1921
Mick Pleass	2	1902
Les Reynolds	3	1929
David Rodan	88	2017–
Harry Rowe	16	1951–1955
George Sandford	83	1904–1913
Ed Sanneman	43	1936–1941
Ernie Schunke	11	1904
Bob Sellers	131	1944–1952
Jimmy Shand	4	1930
Teddy Shorten	156	1930–1949
Fred Sigmont	108	1908–15
Jimmy Smith	33	1907–10
Bert Streckfuss	109	1921–1930
George Threlfall	22	1929–1931
George Topping	3	1913
Lardie Tulloch	65	1905–11
Fred Turnbull	1	1923
Bill Twomey	3	1933
Dick Vernon	4	1912
Bert Wregg	39	1905–1908
