= Andrew Curtis =

Andrew Curtis may refer to:

- Andrew Curtis (umpire), Australian rules football goal umpire
- Andrew Curtis (cricketer), English cricketer
- Andy Curtis, English footballer
