= Schunke =

Schunke is a surname. Notable people with this surname include:

- Charlie Schunke (1879–1924), Australian footballer
- Ernie Schunke (1882–1922), Australian footballer
- Jonathan Schunke (born 1987), Argentine footballer
- Ludwig Schuncke (1810–1834), German pianist and composer [sometimes spelt Louis Schunke]
- Richard Schunke (born 1991), Argentine footballer
