= Albert Pannam =

Albert Pannam may refer to one of two Australian rules footballers from Collingwood:

- Albert Pannam (footballer, born 1882) (1882–1968)
- Alby Pannam (1914–1993)
