= Hayden Kennedy =

Australian rules football umpire

Hayden Kennedy (born 16 October 1965) is a former Australian rules football field umpire in the Australian Football League (AFL) and is also a teacher at St. Bernard's College, Melbourne.

After five AFL Grand Finals and a then-record 495 games, Kennedy announced his retirement on 10 August 2011.

== Early career ==
Kennedy was a junior footballer with St Christophers Football Club in the Oak Park Junior Football League. Kennedy completed his secondary schooling at St. Bernard's College, Melbourne where he previously taught as a Physical Education and a maths teacher. He now umpires the VFL.

Kennedy commenced a career as an umpire in the Essendon District Football League in 1983. After one season there, he was recruited into the VFL cadets squad.

In 1986, Hayden Kennedy umpired the under 19 VFL grand final, and by 1987 had been promoted to the senior list. At this level he umpired the VFL reserves and country football matches.

== Career in the Australian Football League ==
Kennedy had his Australian Football League umpiring debut in 1988, officiating a game between North Melbourne and Carlton. Kennedy's partner on the day was fellow 300 game umpire Peter Cameron.

In the 1995 AFL season, Kennedy umpired in all 22 weeks of Home and Away games, and a further 4 weeks of finals. He was the first umpire to achieve this in 38 years, and the 11th field umpire to do so.

He umpired his first AFL Grand Final in 1995. The game, involving Carlton and Geelong, was shared with boundary umpire Allan Cook. Both Kennedy and Cook had been field umpires together on the cadet squad at the beginnings of their careers and both reached the pinnacle of achievement on the same day having followed very different paths.

Kennedy continued his dominance at the top of the AFL umpiring ranks, umpiring Grand Finals in 1997, 1998, 2000 and 2003 as well as taking part in every finals series. Kennedy has also obtained many other prestige appointments and honours including three State of Origin appointments and being named All Australian Umpire in 1997. He attained Life Membership of the AFL Umpires' Association in 1993.

After reaching the milestone of 300 games in 2002, he qualified for a life membership with the AFL. At that stage he had umpired 294 premiership season games, as well as 22 pre-season matches and three State of Origin games.

In 2006 he umpired the match between St Kilda and Fremantle, along with Matthew Nicholls and Michael Vozzo, where the officials missed the full-time siren. He umpired his 400th match on 8 June 2007 between Essendon versus West Coast at Telstra Dome. and was quickly catching Rowan Sawers in the umpiring record books.

He finally surpassed his former colleague on 8 September 2007 when he umpired in the first elimination final between Hawthorn and Adelaide at the Telstra Dome to break the 410 game record held by Sawers.

Kennedy achieved yet another umpiring honour when he was appointed one of four field umpires to officiate in the AFL Hall of Fame Tribute Match played on 10 May 2008 at the MCG.

== Personal life ==
Hayden is married to wife Maree and resides in Aberfeldie with their three children. As a boy he had followed the team North Melbourne.

== Footnotes ==
Awards
Preceded by Mark Nash	All-Australian Umpire; 1997	Succeeded by Andrew Coates
