= St Kilda v Fremantle (2006 AFL season) =

2006 Australian sporting controversy

2006 AFL Premiership Season
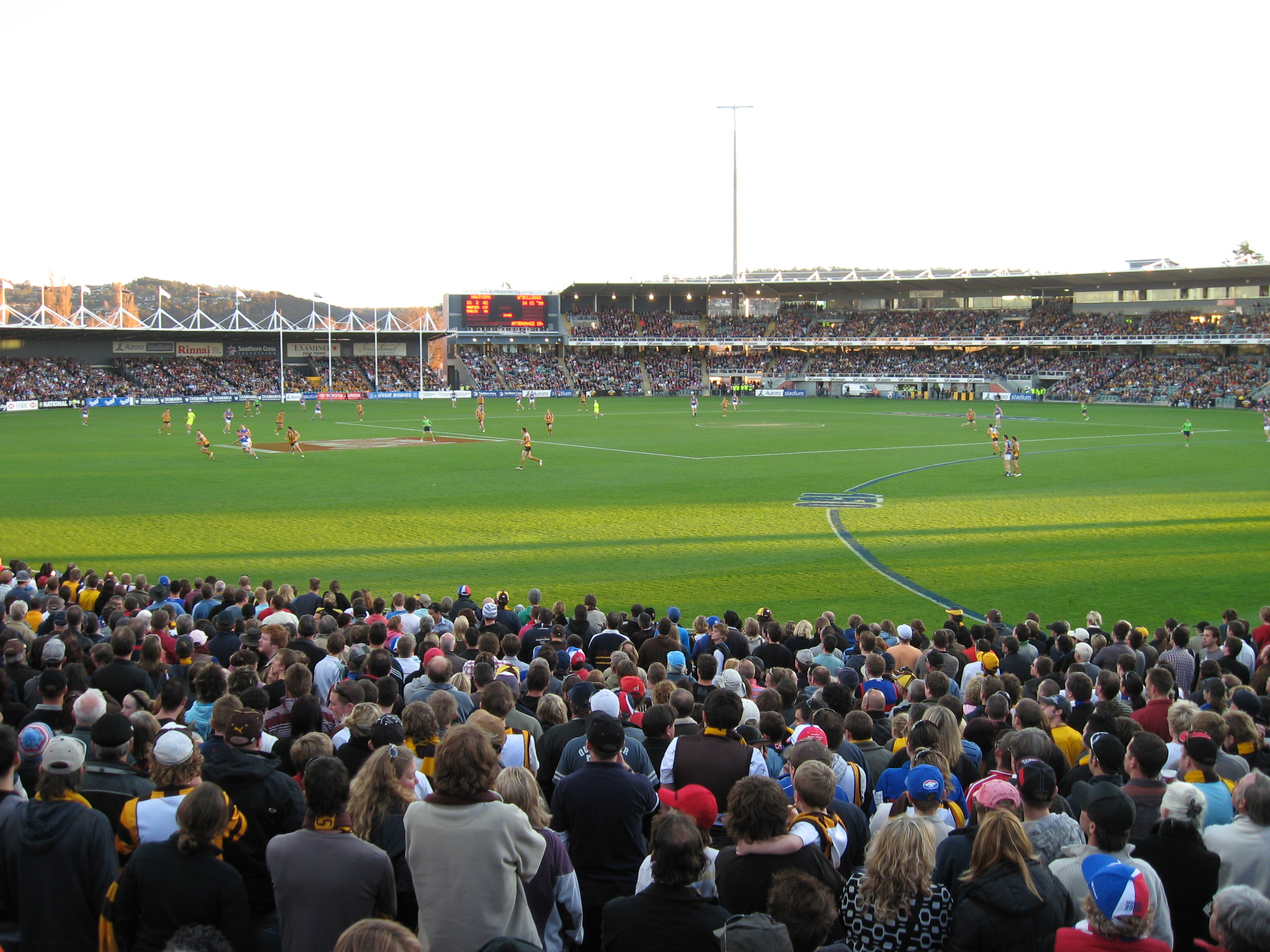

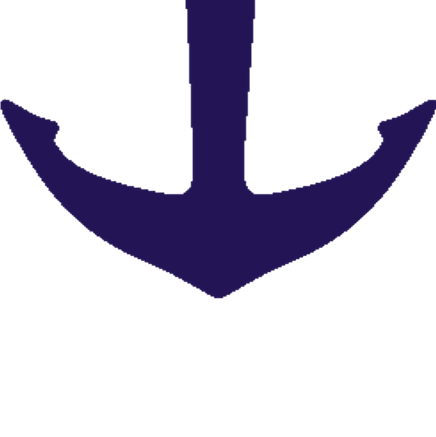
St Kilda	Fremantle
13.15 (93)	14.10 (94)
	1	2	3	4
STK	2.5 (17)	6.7 (43)	9.9 (63)	13.15 (93)
FRE	5.2 (32)	10.5 (65)	12.7 (79)	14.10 (94)
- Date: 30 April 2006
- Stadium: Aurora Stadium
- Attendance: 15,282
- Umpires: Vozzo, Kennedy, Nicholls

Broadcast in Australia
- Network: Nine Network
- Commentators: Dennis Cometti, Dwayne Russell, Michael Roberts, Dermott Brereton

In round 5, 2006, an Australian Football League home-and-away match was played between St Kilda and Fremantle at Aurora Stadium in Launceston, Tasmania, on 30 April 2006.

The match, colloquially known as Sirengate, ended in controversy: when the final siren sounded, Fremantle was leading by one point; however, the umpires did not hear the siren, and play continued for around 10 seconds, during which time St Kilda scored a point to tie the match. Four days later, the AFL Commission determined that the match should have been ended when the first siren sounded and St Kilda was stripped of its last behind, resulting in the victory and the full four premiership points being awarded to Fremantle.

It was only the second time in VFL/AFL history that the score and result of a game was changed on protest.

== Fixture and venue ==
The match was played between St Kilda and Fremantle at Aurora Stadium in Launceston, Tasmania. Both teams went into the match with two wins and two losses, and many media commentators had commented on the importance of the match to both teams.

The two teams had developed an intense rivalry in recent seasons, with a number of controversial games between the two teams ending in very close margins. The previous match between the clubs, at Subiaco Oval, had been highly controversial, with Fremantle coming from behind to win by five points after Justin Longmuir took a mark with seconds left in the match and then kicking a goal after the siren. Numerous contentious free kicks in the match had angered Saints fans, and the anger was intensified by the subsequent "Whispers in the Sky" controversy. The match before that, held at Aurora Stadium, was won by St Kilda by one behind, scored by Aaron Hamill in the final minute following a contentious holding-the-ball decision.

Aurora Stadium was not a regular venue for AFL matches; it had been used as an alternative home ground by St Kilda and Hawthorn since 2001, and it had previously hosted only 16 regular season AFL matches. The crowd numbered 15,282, with the maximum capacity and record attendance for the venue being around 20,000.

== Teams ==
St Kilda
B:	10. Steven Baker	8. Max Hudghton	13. Brett Voss
HB:	15. Jason Gram	31. Matt Maguire	25. Sam Fisher
C:	3. Xavier Clarke	14. Luke Ball (captain)	40. Troy Schwarze
HF:	4. Andrew Thompson	12. Nick Riewoldt	35. Robert Harvey
F:	44. Stephen Milne	9. Fraser Gehrig	22. Aaron Fiora
Foll:	27. Jason Blake	7. Lenny Hayes	26. Nick Dal Santo
Int:	11. Leigh Montagna	32. Andrew McQualter	18. Brendon Goddard
Int:	20. Allan Murray		
Coach:	Grant Thomas		

Fremantle
B:	41. Paul Duffield	37. Michael Johnson	23. Shane Parker
HB:	22. Scott Thornton	14. Antoni Grover	25. Steven Dodd
C:	16. David Mundy	2. Josh Carr	8. Shaun McManus
HF:	29. Matthew Pavlich	18. Luke McPharlin	11. Des Headland
F:	33. Jeff Farmer	10. Troy Cook	12. Graham Polak
Foll:	31. Aaron Sandilands	3.Byron Schammer	32. Peter Bell (captain)
Int:	9. Matthew Carr	15. Ryan Crowley	21. Heath Black
Int:	27. Daniel Gilmore		
Coach:	Chris Connolly		

== Match ==
Fremantle were leading by 27 points midway through the third quarter when St Kilda full-forward Fraser Gehrig conceded five consecutive free kicks during a scuffle with a number of Fremantle defenders. Three of the free kicks were converted to consecutive 50-metre penalties, with the result that Fremantle full-back Michael Johnson was allowed to walk the length of the ground to kick a goal from the goal square that gave Fremantle a 33-point lead.

St Kilda coach Grant Thomas responded by benching the angry Gehrig. Shortly afterwards, he benched tall forward Nick Riewoldt, replacing the forward line with smaller targets in Stephen Milne and Brett Voss. St Kilda then kicked seven of the next nine goals to come back into the game. With 37 seconds of playing time remaining in the game, St Kilda's Leigh Montagna scored the seventh of those goals to bring the Saints within one point of Fremantle; the score was Fremantle 14.10 (94) leading St Kilda 13.15 (93).

=== Final minute and siren ===
From the centre bounce which followed Montagna's goal, St Kilda moved the ball into its forward line, where a pack formed about 45 metres from goal, and a ball-up was called by the umpire with eight seconds remaining. From that ball-up, Nick Riewoldt (St Kilda) knocked the ball across the field, and another pack formed as the official timekeeper's clock reached 0:00 and the timekeeper sounded the siren.

The umpire controlling play, Mathew Nicholls, signalled another ball-up to restart play; he was oblivious to the noise of the siren, which was barely audible over the raucous crowd. A number of Fremantle players, particularly Scott Thornton, appeared to have either heard the siren or reacted to other players hearing the siren, and the Fremantle players began to celebrate what they thought was a one-point victory. Nicholls, however, did not hear the siren and refused to listen to the claims of Fremantle players, particularly Byron Schammer, that the siren had sounded. He also did not confer with the other two umpires, and restarted play.

The Fremantle players, who had converged around the ball-up celebrating and remonstrating with Nicholls, were unprepared when the ball spilled out of the contest and was cleared to St Kilda's Steven Baker. Baker, in the clear, kicked from about 35 metres out to attempt to win the game, just before being bumped by a desperate Daniel Gilmore (Fremantle). While this kick was in motion the timekeeper sounded the siren again and, this time, it was heard by one of the other field umpires, Hayden Kennedy. The laws of Australian football allow for a kick to score if it is in the air when the umpire hears the siren; and Baker's shot for goal missed and scored a behind, worth one point, thus tying the scores at 94 apiece. The goal umpire signalled this behind.

At this point, confusion reigned. The three field umpires and goal umpire conferred to discuss the result. Unaware that the siren had sounded previously, Nicholls ruled that Baker's shot had been within game time, and also that Gilmore's late bump was illegal. If no score had been registered, this would have resulted in a downfield free kick; however, as there had been a behind scored, Baker was given the option of letting the behind stand (ensuring a draw would result) or cancelling the point and having a set shot for goal from the same place (a chance at victory, with a small risk of defeat if he failed to score with his kick). The latter option would be a kick after the siren with the chance to win the game.

A number of Fremantle players, particularly Des Headland, overheard Nicholls stating that the point would not stand and again began to celebrate in the belief that they had been awarded the match, not realising that Baker had received a free kick. At this time, Fremantle coach Chris Connolly and CEO Cameron Schwab had stormed onto the ground. St Kilda captain Lenny Hayes yelled at Connolly to leave the ground, and former teammate Heath Black, now playing for Fremantle, stepped in to separate the two.

Baker elected to cancel his previous behind, and the goal umpires crossed their flags to officially negate the behind, returning the score to 94–93. Baker then took a set shot at goal from 35 metres out, but his kick was wide to the right, again scoring a behind and thus retying the game. At this point, the two goal umpires from either end met at the centre of the ground to compare their score sheets, as is standard practice after the conclusion of AFL matches. After conferring for about a minute, they signalled that the scores on the scoreboard were correct and that the match was a draw, Fremantle 14.10 (94) drew St Kilda 13.16 (94).

== Relevant rules ==
The relevant clauses of the official AFL rules at that time were:

"10.4.1 The timekeepers shall sound the siren to signal the end of a quarter until a field umpire acknowledges that the siren has been heard and brings play to an end."

and

"10.4.2 Play in each quarter shall come to an end when any one of the field umpires hears the signal."

It emerged that the timekeeper had sounded the first siren; the timekeeper erroneously believed, however, that the field umpire had acknowledged it due to the fact that he saw the Fremantle players celebrating the win and the umpire calling for the ball. He then began to pack up, paying no attention to the continuing match, and was not made aware that play was continuing until a spectator got his attention by striking his window with an empty beer can. He then sounded the siren a second time, just after Baker's first kick for goal.

As a result, the timekeepers erred with respect to Rule 10.4.1; that is, the siren did not continue to sound until it was formally acknowledged by an umpire. Acknowledgement of the siren requires any one of the three field umpires to raise both arms into the air and blow the whistle. There remains some doubt as to whether any of the three umpires did hear the siren; however, in any event, none chose to bring play to an end as required by Rule 10.4.2. The rules do make clear that the umpires, rather than the siren, are the sole judges of when a quarter ends; however, in practice, this is usually in the form of a split-second judgement call on whether a mark or kick occurred before or after the siren sounded rather than the 25 seconds difference in this case.

== Aftermath ==
=== Initial result ===
Immediately after the match, Fremantle lodged an official protest, claiming to have won the game by a point. The AFL agreed to conduct a full investigation and did not rule out overturning the result and awarding the match to Fremantle. However, the AFL still released the official round results that listed the result of the match as a draw.

=== Betting ===
As a result of the official results being issued on Sunday afternoon, most betting agencies paid out on a draw. Some smaller agencies also announced (before the AFL awarded the victory to Fremantle) that they would voluntarily pay out for the Fremantle win as a goodwill gesture. The largest sports bookmaker in Australia, TAB Sportsbet, however, did not alter from the original decision, even after the AFL revised the official result, because their conditions of betting stated that they pay based on the league's official AFL match results sheet as received by fax shortly after each game.

=== Media coverage and analysis ===
As the goal umpires were signalling that the scores were correct, Nine Network reporter Michael Roberts interviewed Chris Connolly on the ground. Connolly was adamant that the siren had gone and said that the emergency umpire had thought Hayden Kennedy had heard the siren, so the game had finished before the final ball-up. He said, "The right thing has got to be done... I'm sure the AFL will make the right decision."

A few minutes later in the changerooms, Roberts conducted an interview with the St Kilda coach, Grant Thomas, who acknowledged that the Saints had played poorly and were happy to escape with a draw.

In his post-match conference, Connolly stubbornly described the match as "a great win by the boys" and stated that "the Fremantle Football Club will leave no stone unturned for our 35,000 supporters to get these four points."

Over the next few days, the incident received widespread coverage in the Australian sports media, with the Australian Football League website describing the match as "one of the most controversial matches of the modern era". The West Australian and Nine Network's The Footy Show dubbed the incident Sirengate, the -gate suffix being a reference to the Watergate scandal.

Media analysis of the incident hinged on the interpretation of the relevant rules. Rule 10.4.2 implies that the match does not automatically end when the siren sounds but rather continues until the umpire hears the siren and signals the end of the game. This would lead to the conclusion that the result must stand as a draw. However, Rule 10.4.1 requires the timekeeper to sound the siren continuously until an umpire acknowledges the siren and calls an end to play. This rule was not correctly observed by the timekeeper. This leads to an argument that the match was not brought to an end according to the rules of the game and that the outcome of the game was determined not within the playing arena but rather by external governance matters that are the responsibility of the AFL: the quality of match facilities and the performance of timekeeping duties. This line of argument leads to the view that natural justice required the game to be awarded to Fremantle.

=== Investigation and ruling ===
The AFL football operations department commenced an investigation of the conclusion of this match, to be conducted by AFL Investigations Officers Allan Roberts and Bill Kneebone. After interviewing the umpires, timekeepers, AFL match manager and a spectator, as well as reviewing the television replay, they concluded that "It would appear that the timekeeper(s) have not complied with (Law 10.4.1 End of Quarter)."

During a four-hour hearing on Wednesday, 3 May, the AFL Commission heard submissions from representatives of both teams and the AFL investigating officer. The result of the hearing was that Fremantle was awarded victory and four competition points, with the official final score reading St Kilda: 13.15 (93) vs. Fremantle: 14.10 (94). On 4 May, St Kilda ruled out a legal challenge to the outcome, ending any further uncertainty.

The commission stressed that this decision was in response to a unique set of circumstances external to the game rather than overruling an on-field umpiring decision; hence, no precedent was set for the overturning of results decided by controversial umpiring decisions, errors by goal umpires, etc. The key factor was that the timekeeper had not fulfilled his duties by failing to sound the siren continuously until the umpires acknowledged the end of the game. This prevented the umpires from being able to end the game at the correct time.

An upgrade of the York Park siren was implemented by the grounds manager, former Western Bulldogs player Robert Groenewegen, in May 2006, in anticipation of the Round 12 game at the venue.

=== Chris Connolly on the arena ===
A secondary point for discussion was Chris Connolly's angry march onto the ground. According to the rules of the game, the coach is not allowed onto the playing arena during the game. Because Connolly had walked onto the ground before the umpires had officially ended the game (after Steven Baker's secondary kick), he had contravened the rule, which would usually result in a fine and a "please explain" from the AFL but no other penalty. Commentators had pointed out that a fine was not mandatory but applied to a case on its merits and that, in the prevailing confusion of the game, it would be reasonable for the AFL to waive the fine in favour of a simple "please explain".

Ultimately, because the commission changed the result of the game, it meant that the game was retrospectively declared over when Connolly entered the arena; as such, Connolly was no longer guilty of any infraction, and therefore the AFL had no grounds to issue any fine.

== Scorecard ==
Round 5, 2006
Sunday, 30 April 2006 (1:10 pm)	St Kilda	def. by	Fremantle	York Park (crowd: 15,282)
2.5 (17); 6.7 (43); 9.9 (63); 13.15 (93)	Q1; Q2; Q3; Final	5.2 (32); 10.5 (65); 12.7 (79); 14.10 (94)	Umpires: Vozzo, Kennedy, Nicholls; Television broadcast: Nine Network
Gehrig 3, Milne 2, Voss, Blake, Dal Santo, Montagna, Murray, Riewoldt	Goals	Pavlich 6, Farmer 3, McPharlin 2, Gilmore, Headland, Johnson
Blake, Dal Santo, Ball, Fisher, Voss, Harvey	Best	Pavlich, Johnson, Farmer, Bell, J. Carr
Hudghton (hand)	Injuries	McManus (leg)
Gehrig for striking J. Carr in the first quarter, Hudghton for spitting at McPharlin in the first quarter, Hayes for attempting to strike Dodd in the first quarter	Reports	Farmer for striking Harvey in the first quarter

Brownlow Medal votes
3 M. Pavlich; 2 J. Carr; 1 B. Voss

== End of season ==
Although the match was played quite early in the season, the end result proved important when determining the ladder placings at the conclusion of the home-and-away season. Fremantle finished with a record of 15–7 in third place, and St Kilda finished with a record of 14–8 in sixth place, with Sydney and Collingwood finishing fourth and fifth with a 14–8 record. Had the draw stood (and all other results throughout the season remained the same), Fremantle and St Kilda would have been level on 14–7–1; St Kilda's superior percentage would have seen them finish third, with Fremantle fourth, Sydney fifth, and Collingwood sixth. This would have affected all four match-ups in the first week of the finals and given St Kilda a double chance at the expense of Sydney (who went on to make the grand final).

Early in the season, there was ongoing speculation that, if the talented Fremantle lineup failed to reach the finals, it might cost Fremantle coach Chris Connolly his job at the club. Before the result was officially overturned, it was thought that the two points potentially lost by the siren mistake could be the difference between making or missing the finals. Ironically, however, it was St Kilda coach Grant Thomas who was dismissed at the end of the season after (though not necessarily because) the club was defeated by Melbourne and eliminated in the first week of the finals, which would certainly not have happened if St Kilda had finished third and claimed a double chance.

== Similar incidents ==
There have been several occasions in Australian rules history of winning or decisive scores being kicked after the siren or bell had sounded, but failed to be heard, with a variety of outcomes to protests. These were much more common prior to the introduction of sirens, with the timekeepers' bells which were previously used much more likely to be unheard by the umpires. Protests of this nature were considerably more likely to be upheld prior to 1911, when the Laws of the Game were first amended to include the clause "the field umpire shall be the sole judge as to the first sound of the bell."

Famous similar instances include:

- VFA, 1890, Fitzroy 4.13 defeated Port Melbourne 3.7. Port Melbourne protested that the mark from which Jack Worrall scored Fitzroy's first goal was taken after the half time bell was rung but not heard by the umpires; the Association upheld the appeal, and amended the result to a 3.13 vs 3.7 draw (behinds did not count towards the result at this time). "Follower", the influential football writer in the Leader and the Age newspapers, considered the Association's decision outrageous and refused to recognise it, and his newspapers published a version of the season's final ladder with Fitzroy's win still standing.
- VFL, Round 1, 1900, Melbourne 9.14 (68) drew with St Kilda 10.8 (68). St Kilda successfully protested that Melbourne had scored a behind after the three-quarter-time bell, and the score was amended to a St Kilda victory by one point. It was the only precedent of a VFL/AFL match result being overturned on such an appeal; and it was St Kilda's first-ever VFL win, taking place after 48 losses in three winless seasons from 1897–1899.
- WAFL Grand Final, 1907, East Fremantle 6.11 (47) defeated Perth 6.6 (42). Perth successfully protested that East Fremantle had kicked a goal from a free kick which was not awarded until after the half time bell, and the score was amended to a Perth victory by one point.
- VFL, Round 2, 1911, Melbourne 7.12 (54) drew Geelong 7.12 (54) after Geelong's Bert Whittington was awarded a touched/rushed behind from an after-the-bell set shot because the umpire had not heard the bell. Had the umpire heard the bell, the ball would have been considered dead when touched and Melbourne would have won by one point. Melbourne protested, but its protest was dismissed.
- VFL, Round 17, 1928, St Kilda 12.10 (82) defeated Melbourne 11.15 (81). Melbourne protested, arguing that Bert Smedley's winning goal was kicked about seven seconds after the final bell had rung. Although the timekeepers agreed that the goal had been scored after the bell, the protest was dismissed because the umpire hadn't heard it.
- VFA, 1950, Brunswick defeated Camberwell by five points, after the umpire failed to hear the final bell and the winning goal was kicked by Ivor McIvor after an additional fifteen seconds of play. On protest, the match was declared no result; the match was late in the season and did not affect the final four, so it was not replayed.
- In VFL, Round 10, 1962, Carlton defeated Fitzroy by one point at the Brunswick Street Oval, after the umpire failed to hear the final siren and the winning behind was rushed by Carlton's Martin Cross from a ball-up. Fitzroy did not protest the result; it did request that the Fitzroy Cricket Club install new sirens the ground to avoid a repeat, but the request was rejected.
- Night Series Grand Final, 1980, between North Melbourne and Collingwood at VFL Park. In a passage of play which followed the sounding of the final siren, North Melbourne's Kerry Good marked and goaled after the siren to win the game for North Melbourne by three points. Collingwood did not protest.
- VFA, 1982. Geelong West's Simon Taylor kicked the winning goal against Frankston after the final siren. The controlling umpire failed to hear the siren, while the non-controlling umpire heard the siren and signalled the end of play; the two umpires conferred and awarded the goal. Frankston appealed the result, but the appeal was rejected. As in the St Kilda vs Fremantle match, the Association found that the timekeeper should have sounded the siren for longer.
- STJFL (Southern Tasmanian Junior FL) Under-14 Grand Final, 2007. Sorell was leading Lauderdale by three points when the siren sounded, but the umpires failed to hear it and the timekeepers failed to keep the siren going. In the ensuing play, Lauderdale kicked a goal, won the game by three points, and was presented with the premiership. Sorell lodged a protest, and the STJFL declared the match a draw and awarded the premiership jointly to both teams.

== See also ==
- 2006 AFL season
- List of Australian sports controversies
- List of "-gate" scandals
