= Ian Burrows (umpire) =

Australian rules football boundary umpire

Personal information
- Full name: Ian Burrows

Umpiring career
Years	League	Role	Games
2001-2002	Yarra Valley MDFL	Boundary umpire	
2002-2005	VFL	Boundary umpire	48
2006–present	AFL	Boundary umpire	465

Career highlights
- 10× AFL grand finals: 2008, 2010, 2010 Replay, 2012, 2014, 2015, 2016, 2019, 2020, 2023 (league record); 53× AFL finals (league record); VFL/AFL Games Record Holder as a Boundary Umpire (465); 2x Murray Williams Shield (2014, 2016); 3x All-Australian Boundary Umpire (2010, 2012, 2015); 2001 Yarra Valley Grand Final Umpire; 2x TAC Cup Grand Final Umpire (2002, 2003); 2004 VFL Reserves Grand Final; 2005 VFL vs SANFL Interstate Match Umpire; 2005 VFL Grand Final Umpire; 2007 Bill Sutton Medallion

Ian Burrows is an Australian rules football Boundary umpire in the Australian Football League (AFL).

Burrows started umpiring in the Yarra Valley Mountain District Football League in 2001, quickly rising up the ranks ending his debut season with a grand final selection. He progressed up the ranks umpiring the TAC Cup Grand Finals in both 2002 and 2003, the VFL Reserves Grand Final in 2004 and then the Victorian Football League Grand Final in 2005.

He made his debut in the Australian Football League in Round 1, 2006 umpiring the Collingwood vs Adelaide at the Docklands Stadium. He has gone on to earn a record 10 Grand Final Appointments as well as three All-Australian Selections throughout his career. In Round 11 2026, he became the first boundary umpire to reach the 450-game milestone umpiring the match between Collingwood and the West Coast Eagles at the Melbourne Cricket Ground
