= Jordyn Pearson =

Australian rules football umpire

Personal information
- Full name: Jordyn Pearson
- Other occupation: P.E. teacher at Penleigh and Essendon Grammar School

Umpiring career
Years	League	Role	Games
2020–	AFLW	Field umpire	51
2026–	AFL	Field umpire	13

Jordyn Pearson is an Australian rules football field umpire in the Australian Football League (AFL) and AFL Women's (AFLW).

== Umpiring career ==
Pearson began umpiring in the Essendon District Football League in 2012. In 2016, Pearson was awarded the EDFL Golden Whistle award as the league's standout umpire for the year.

Pearson umpired her first AFLW game in round 6 of the 2020 AFLW season. Two years later in 2022, Pearson umpired the 2022 AFLW season 6 Grand Final. In the same year, she became only the third female umpire to adjudicate in the VFL. In 2024, she won the AFLW Umpiring Rising Star Award.

Ahead of the 2025 AFL season, Pearson joined the AFL Umpires list in a rookie position. She was appointed to the senior list the following year. She made her AFL umpiring debut in a match between Melbourne and West Coast in round 9 of the 2026 AFL season, becoming just the second female field umpire in the AFL following Eleni Tee.
