= Charlie Pannam =

Charlie Pannam may refer to one of two Australian rules footballers from Collingwood:

- Charlie Pannam (footballer, born 1874) (1874–1952), also captained and coached Richmond
- Charlie Pannam (footballer, born 1897) (b. 1897), also played for and coached South Melbourne, son of the above
