= Lawrie Delaney =

Australian rules footballer

Personal information
- Full name: Lawrence James Delany
- Born: 11 June 1883; Fitzroy, Victoria
- Died: 8 September 1946 (aged 63); Malvern, Victoria
- Original team: Carlton Juniors

Playing career^{1}
Years	Club	Games (Goals)
1901	St Kilda	2 (2)
- ^{1} Playing statistics correct to the end of 1901.

Lawrence James Delaney (11 June 1883 – 8 September 1946) was an Australian rules footballer who played with St Kilda in the Victorian Football League (VFL).
