= Fred Sigmont =

Australian rules footballer and umpire

Personal information
- Full name: Frederick William Abercrombie Sigmont
- Born: 14 May 1873; Collingwood, Victoria
- Died: 30 July 1950 (aged 77); Parkville, Victoria

Playing career^{1}
Years	Club	Games (Goals)
1897	South Melbourne	6 (0)
- ^{1} Playing statistics correct to the end of 1897.

Frederick William Abercrombie Sigmont (14 May 1873 – 30 July 1950) was an Australian rules footballer who played for South Melbourne in the Victorian Football League (VFL).

Originally from Carlton Juniors, Sigmont played six games with Williamstown Football Club in the 1894 VFA season. The next season he transferred to Carlton but did not make a senior appearance in his time with the club. Sigmont played six times with South Melbourne in 1897, the inaugural VFL season, and took part in their first ever match in the league.

As a goal umpire, Sigmont officiated in the 1909 VFL Grand Final, which his former club won. In all he made umpired in 108 games, before retiring in 1915.
