= Michael O'Gorman (footballer) =

Australian rules footballer and umpire

Personal information
- Full name: Michael Joseph O'Gorman
- Born: 8 November 1874; Melbourne, Victoria
- Died: 10 July 1937 (aged 62); Southbank, Victoria
- Original team: South Melbourne (VFA)
- Position: Forward

Playing career^{1}
Years	Club	Games (Goals)
1895–96	South Melbourne (VFA)	28 (14)
1897–98	South Melbourne	12 (14)
1899–1900	St Kilda	17 (5)
Total		29 (19)
- ^{1} Playing statistics correct to the end of 1900.

Michael Joseph O'Gorman (8 November 1874 – 10 July 1937) was an Australian rules footballer who played with South Melbourne and St Kilda in the Victorian Football League (VFL). He went by the alias Mick Minahan during his football career.

== Career ==
O'Gorman played as a forward and kicked 13 goals in his first VFL season, at South Melbourne. He crossed to St Kilda in 1899 but O'Gorman wasn't able to experience any team success, with the club losing each of the 18 matches that he played in over two years.

From 1902 to 1915, O'Gorman umpired 172 league matches as a goal umpire, including the 1904, 1913 and 1914 Grand Finals. His umpiring career stalled in 1911 when he was seriously injured in a lift accident. After he retired from officiating in the VFL, O'Gorman volunteered and served with the AIF.
