= Phil Lane (footballer) =

Australian rules footballer, born 1911

Personal information
- Full name: Philip Henry Lane
- Born: 12 March 1911; West Melbourne
- Died: 8 August 2006 (aged 95)

Playing career^{1}
Years	Club	Games (Goals)
1932	Fitzroy	1 (0)
- ^{1} Playing statistics correct to the end of 1932.

Phil Lane (12 March 1911 – 8 August 2006) was an Australian rules footballer who played for Fitzroy in the Victorian Football League (VFL).

Although he was listed at Fitzroy for three years, Lane made his only appearance with the seniors early in the 1932 VFL season, a 19-point loss to North Melbourne at Brunswick Street. He then became a field umpire and officiated in 26 VFL games from 1943 to 1946 as well as the reserves Grand Final in 1947.
