= Bill Coffey (footballer) =

Australian rules footballer (1896–1962)

Personal information
- Full name: William John Coffey
- Born: 10 October 1896; Fitzroy North, Victoria
- Died: 9 April 1962 (aged 65); Cheltenham, Victoria

Playing career^{1}
Years	Club	Games (Goals)
1918	Essendon	1 (0)
- ^{1} Playing statistics correct to the end of 1918.

William John Coffey (10 October 1896 – 9 April 1962) was an Australian rules footballer who played with Essendon in the Victorian Football League (VFL).
