= Charlie Schunke =

Australian rules footballer

Personal information
- Full name: Charles Henry Schunke
- Born: 21 March 1879; Carlton, Victoria
- Died: 20 August 1924 (aged 45); Kew, Victoria
- Original team: Fitzroy Crescent

Playing career^{1}
Years	Club	Games (Goals)
1901	Carlton	1 (0)
- ^{1} Playing statistics correct to the end of 1901.

Charles Henry Schunke (21 March 1879 – 20 August 1924) was an Australian rules footballer who played with Carlton in the Victorian Football League (VFL).

One of his brothers, Ernest Wilfred Schunke (1882–1922), played for Richmond.
