= Billy Briscoe (Australian footballer) =

Australian rules footballer (1892–1943)

Personal information
- Full name: William Leslie Briscoe
- Born: 11 January 1892; Preston, Victoria
- Died: 18 May 1943 (aged 51); Mentone, Victoria
- Original team: West Torrens
- Height: 170 cm (5 ft 7 in)
- Weight: 78 kg (172 lb)

Playing career^{1}
Years	Club	Games (Goals)
1915–1918	Richmond	26 (6)
1919–1920	Brunswick (VFA)	19 (2)
1920–1923	Port Melbourne (VFA)	58 (3)
1924	Hawthorn (VFA)	3 (0)
- ^{1} Playing statistics correct to the end of 1924.

William Leslie Briscoe (11 January 1892 – 18 May 1943) was an Australian rules footballer who played with Richmond in the Victorian Football League (VFL).

Briscoe came to Richmond from South Australian club West Torrens. He made 26 appearances for Richmond, over four seasons, during World War I. He later played for Brunswick, Port Melbourne and Hawthorn in the Victorian Football Association (VFA). From 1926 to 1928, Briscoe was a VFL boundary umpire, then a goal umpire in 1929. He officiated in a total of 51 league games.
