= Ernie Schunke =

Australian rules footballer

Personal information
- Full name: Ernest Wilfred Schunke
- Born: 26 October 1882; Carlton, Victoria
- Died: 6 November 1922 (aged 40); South Melbourne, Victoria
- Original team: Carlton Districts
- Height: 169 cm (5 ft 7 in)
- Position: Wing

Playing career^{1}
Years	Club	Games (Goals)
1909	Richmond	6 (0)
- ^{1} Playing statistics correct to the end of 1909.

Ernest Wilfred Schunke (26 October 1882 – 6 November 1922) was an Australian rules footballer who played with Richmond in the Victorian Football League (VFL). He has the unusual distinction of having been a VFL umpire, before his VFL playing career.

== Family ==
The son of August Henry Schunke (1850–1928), a butcher, and Elizabeth Schunke, née Coleman, Ernest grew up with three siblings, Charles Henry Schunke (1879–1924) who played for Carlton, Edwin James (1887–1974), and Rose Elizabeth Langstreth (1885–1940), née Schunke.

He married Helena Francesca "Nellie" Spackman in 1913. They had two children: Joy and Ivy.

== Football ==
=== Umpire ===
Schunke was a boundary umpire for 11 games in the 1904 VFL season. It was the year that the VFL introduced boundary umpires.

=== Richmond ===
Recruited by Richmond from Carlton Districts, he played in the final six rounds of the 1909 VFL season.

== Death ==
He was killed almost instantaneously in a work accident at the James Moore and Son's timber yards in South Melbourne on 6 November 1922, when a cutting knife from a shaping machine, which had come loose, flew through the air and struck him just above the heart.
