= Mathew Nicholls =

Australian rules football umpire (born 1977)

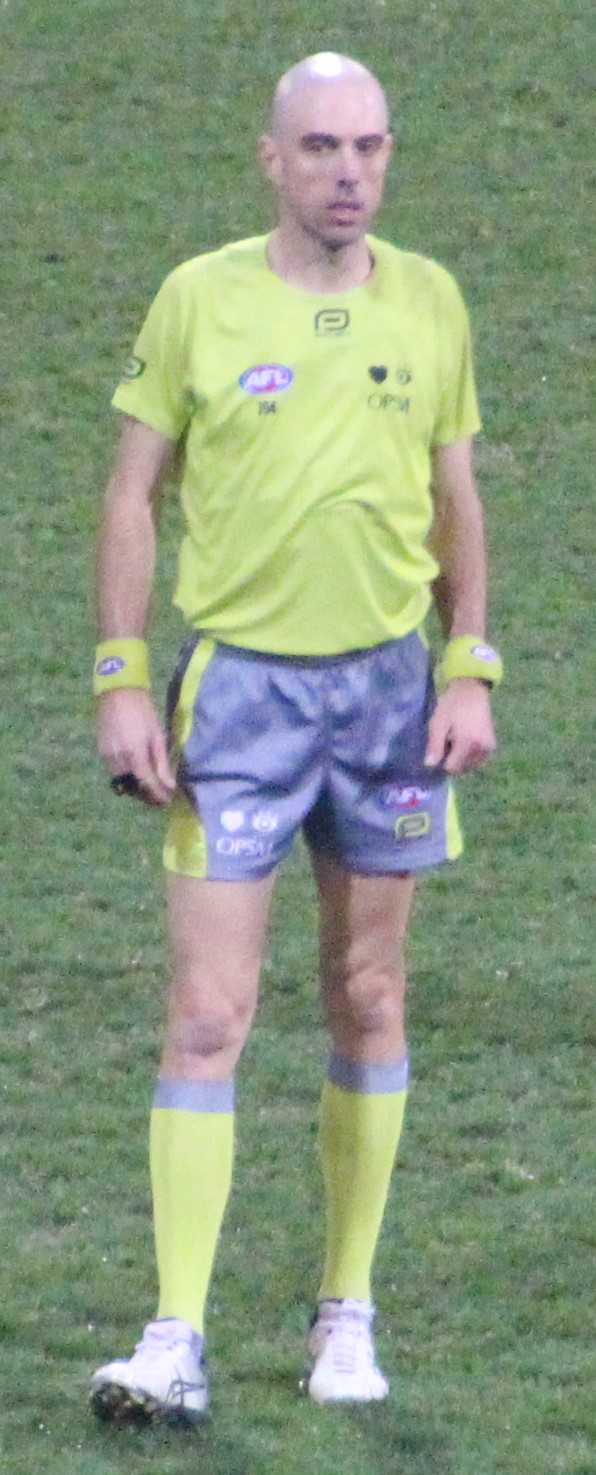
- Nicholls at a game between the Brisbane Lions and the Gold Coast Suns in August 2017

Personal information
- Full name: Matthew Nicholls
- Born: 1977 (age 48–49)

Umpiring career
Years	League	Role	Games
2003–	AFL	Field umpire	457

Mathew Nicholls (born 1977) is an Australian rules football field umpire in the Australian Football League.

He officiated in the 2013 AFL Grand Final and the 2014 AFL Grand Final.

Nicholls was notably umpiring during the infamous Sirengate match between St Kilda and Fremantle in 2006, when play was allowed to continue after the final siren because the siren was too quiet for Nicholls to hear.

Nicholls is also notably referred to as "the best bouncer in the business", by commentator Brian Taylor, a reference to his ability to produce a large centre bounce.
