= Andy Curtis =

English footballer

Personal information
- Full name: Andrew Curtis
- Date of birth: 2 December 1972 (age 53)
- Place of birth: Doncaster, West Riding of Yorkshire, England
- Height: 5 ft 10 in (1.78 m)
- Position: Winger

Youth career
- 1989–1991: York City

Senior career*
| Years | Team | Apps | (Gls) |
| 1991–1992 | York City | 12 | (0) |
| 1992 | Kettering Town | | |
| 1992– | Peterborough United | 11 | (1) |
| 1992-1993 | Boston United | 8 | (2) |
| 1995–1996 | York City | 1 | (0) |
| 1996– | Scarborough | 5 | (0) |
| Total | | 29 | (1) |
- * Club domestic league appearances and goals

Andrew Curtis (born 2 December 1972) is an English former professional footballer who played as a winger in the Football League for York City, Peterborough United and Scarborough, and in non-League football for Kettering Town and Scarborough.
