= Ted Hall (footballer) =

Australian rules footballer and field umpire

Personal information
- Full name: Edward Hall
- Born: 8 February 1876; Ballarat, Victoria
- Died: 30 December 1903 (aged 27); Boolarra, Victoria
- Position: Centreman

Playing career^{1}
Years	Club	Games (Goals)
1897–1902	St Kilda	73 (10)
- ^{1} Playing statistics correct to the end of 1902.

Edward Hall (8 February 1876 – 30 December 1903) was an Australian rules footballer who played for St Kilda in the Victorian Football League (VFL).

Ted Hall holds the league record for having the worst winning percentage of all VFL/AFL footballers to have played at least 50 games. He experienced victory just once in his league career, when St Kilda defeated Carlton at Junction Oval during the 1901 VFL season. Before that, Hall had appeared in 62 successive losses from his debut in 1897. This record is 13 above teammate Joe Hogan, with 49.

A centreman, he briefly became a field umpire in 1900, but after officiating in a Round 2 game ended up finishing the season and his career back at St Kilda.
