= Sam Chapman (footballer) =

Australian rules footballer (1876–1949)

Personal information
- Full name: Etienne Samuel Chapman
- Born: 26 April 1876; East Melbourne, Victoria
- Died: 2 December 1949 (aged 73); Surrey Hills, Victoria
- Height: 180 cm (5 ft 11 in)
- Weight: 72 kg (159 lb)

Playing career^{1}
Years	Club	Games (Goals)
1897–1898	Carlton	25 (17)
- ^{1} Playing statistics correct to the end of 1898.

Etienne Samuel Chapman (26 April 1876 – 2 December 1949) was an Australian rules footballer who played with Carlton in the Victorian Football League (VFL).

Chapman was educated at Scotch College and played his early football in the Victorian Football Association for 1 game with Richmond in 1892, then Fitzroy, St Kilda and South Melbourne

A forward, Chapman joined Carlton for the 1897 VFL season, the inaugural league season. He played 13 games that year and kicked four of Carlton's five goals in their round six defeat of St Kilda at Junction Oval, to register their first ever VFL win.

In the 1898 VFL season, Chapman made a further 12 appearances.

Chapman was a VFL goal umpire from 1902 to 1913. He officiated in a total of 160 games, including grand finals in 1907, 1911 and 1913.
