= Andrew Curtis (umpire) =

Australian rules football goal umpire

Andrew Curtis is a former Australian rules football goal umpire.

== Umpiring career ==
=== WAFL ===
Curtis began his career as a goal umpire with the North Pilbara Football League in 1986. He was transferred by his employer BHP to Launceston, Tasmania where he continued his umpiring career with the Tasmanian Football League. In 1991, he returned to Perth, Western Australia and joined the Western Australian Football League. He umpired in the 1996 WAFL Grand Final between East Perth Football Club and Claremont Football Club. By the time of his retirement in 2006 he had umpired 143 WAFL league matches.

In 2003, he was inducted as a Life Member to the West Australian National Football League Umpiring Association.

=== AFL ===
Curtis joined the Australian Football League umpiring panel in 1996. In 2000, he was appointed to his first AFL final and was also selected to officiate in an exhibition match held at The Oval in London. Between 1996 and 2006 Curtis umpired 107 AFL senior matches which included 10 finals.

He was appointed to umpire in both the 2003 and 2005 International Rules Series matches between Australia and Ireland, played at Subiaco Oval in Perth.

Curtis was appointed as a goal umpire in the 2004 AFL Grand Final played between Port Adelaide Football Club and Brisbane Lions. This was the first interstate AFL grand final between AFL football clubs not based in Victoria. In 2006, he was chosen to officiate in an exhibition match in Los Angeles, USA on the UCLA campus.

=== Retirement ===
In August 2006 Curtis created a controversy in the last quarter of the Round 21 Western Derby match between West Coast and Fremantle when he indicated goals using his thumbs rather than the customary forefingers.

Curtis was awarded life membership with the Australian Football League Umpires Association in 2007.
