= Teddy Shorten =

Australian rules footballer and umpire

Personal information
- Full name: Edward Henry Shorten
- Born: 28 April 1898; Kensington, Victoria
- Died: 9 July 1949 (aged 51); Ascot Vale, Victoria
- Original team: North Melbourne (VFA)
- Height: 168 cm (5 ft 6 in)
- Weight: 58 kg (128 lb)

Playing career^{1}
Years	Club	Games (Goals)
1925–1926	North Melbourne	6 (4)
1926	Essendon	5 (4)
Total		11 (8)
- ^{1} Playing statistics correct to the end of 1926.

Edward Henry Shorten (28 April 1898 – 9 July 1949) was an Australian rules footballer who played with North Melbourne and Essendon in the Victorian Football League (VFL).

Shorten played for North Melbourne while they were in the Victorian Football Association and was a member of the team for their inaugural VFL season in 1925. He made five appearances that year. In 1926 he played in the opening round, then joined his cousin George Shorten at Essendon. Shorten appeared in five senior games for Essendon, two of them finals, including their three-point preliminary final loss to Melbourne. He transferred to Cheltenham in 1927. In 1930 he returned to the VFL as a boundary umpire and officiated in 12 games over two seasons. From 1939 to 1949, he officiated in a further 144 games, as a goal umpire.
