= Pat Kennedy (footballer, born 1898) =

Australian rules footballer and umpire

Personal information
- Full name: Patrick Gerald Kennedy
- Born: 30 July 1898; Heidelberg, Victoria
- Died: 20 September 1981 (aged 83); Glen Waverley, Victoria
- Original team: Williamstown (VFA)
- Height: 191 cm (6 ft 3 in)
- Weight: 84 kg (185 lb)

Playing career^{1}
Years	Club	Games (Goals)
1918, 1920–21	St Kilda	11 (3)
- ^{1} Playing statistics correct to the end of 1921.

Patrick Gerald Kennedy (30 July 1898 – 20 September 1981) was an Australian rules footballer who played with St Kilda in the Victorian Football League (VFL).

He later became a boundary umpire from 1925 until 1931.
