= Bill Griffiths (footballer, born 1879) =

Australian rules footballer

Personal information
- Full name: William John Griffiths
- Born: 5 April 1879; Flemington, Victoria
- Died: 16 October 1928 (aged 49); Melbourne
- Original team: Essendon Town

Playing career^{1}
Years	Club	Games (Goals)
1903	Fitzroy	8 (2)
1904–1905	South Melbourne	9 (0)
Total		17 (2)
- ^{1} Playing statistics correct to the end of 1905.

William John Griffiths (5 April 1879 – 16 October 1928) was an Australian rules footballer who played with Fitzroy and South Melbourne in the Victorian Football League (VFL).

Griffiths played his early football at Essendon Town, in the Victorian Football Association.

He appeared eight times for Fitzroy in the 1903 VFL season but was not selected in the finals. The following year he took the field with South Melbourne and played eight games in his first season and one more in 1905.

Griffiths was a field umpire for one league game in 1911 and a boundary umpire in 19 games between 1911 and 1913.

After retiring from football, Griffiths kept active as a district cricketer and spent some time with the St Kilda Cricket Club. He was a member of the Elsternwick second eleven when he was killed in 1928, while practicing. A ball had struck him on the head as he was attempting to take a catch and he suffered a skull fracture. He was taken to The Alfred Hospital but died soon after.
