= William Blair (Australian footballer) =

Australian rules footballer

Personal information
- Full name: William Daniel Blair
- Born: 3 June 1912; Newstead, Victoria
- Died: 5 June 1960 (aged 48); Wangaratta, Victoria
- Original team: Ouyen Rovers
- Height: 180 cm (5 ft 11 in)

Playing career^{1}
| Years | Club | Games (Goals) | |
| 1935 | Geelong | 2 (0) | |

Umpiring career
| Years | League | Role | Games |
| 1940–1945 | VFL | Boundary umpire | 41 |
- ^{1} Playing statistics correct to the end of 1935.

William Daniel Blair (3 June 1912 – 5 June 1960) was an Australian rules footballer and umpire who played with Geelong in the Victorian Football League (VFL).

== Playing career ==
Blair was an 'oft match-winning defender' and vice-captain for Ouyen Rovers when he was invited to trial by Hawthorn in 1933. He declined the offer but just after the commencement of the 1934 season he was transferred to Geelong as a result of his job.

He joined Geelong Second Eighteens at the start of 1935. After a number of good performances Blair was promoted to the seniors for round 10 against North Melbourne, one of several changes to cover a spate of injuries. He was selected again for round 18, Geelong's final match of the season. Blair's last appearance for Geelong was in the losing 1935 Second Eighteens Grand Final side.

Transferred again for work in October 1935 he moved to Melbourne. Both Melbourne and North Melbourne were granted permission to approach Blair in 1936 but he was not listed by either club and joined Fairfield in the sub-district competition.

== Umpiring career ==
Blair was appointed to the VFL list of boundary umpires in 1940. He made his VFL debut in the round two match St Kilda versus Hawthorn becoming the 254th boundary umpire in VFL history.

In early 1942, having umpired 26 VFL matches, Blair was called up for full-time service with the CMF and later transferred to the AIF. A telegraphist by trade he served in the Australian Army Postal Unit until discharged in August 1946. His later Army postings to Melbourne allowed him to return to boundary umpiring and he officiated in 15 matches during the 1945 season.
