= Neville Heffernan =

Australian rules footballer, born 1908

Personal information
- Full name: Neville John Laurence Heffernan
- Born: 12 July 1908; North Melbourne, Victoria
- Died: 6 February 1973 (aged 64); West Footscray, Victoria

Playing career^{1}
Years	Club	Games (Goals)
1929–30	North Melbourne	6 (4)
- ^{1} Playing statistics correct to the end of 1930.

Neville John Laurence Heffernan (12 July 1908 – 6 February 1973) was an Australian rules footballer who played with North Melbourne in the Victorian Football League (VFL), with Preston in the Victorian Football Association (VFA), and who officiated in 67 matches as a VFL boundary umpire.

== Family ==
The son of John Edward Heffernan (1880-1955), and Harriet Heffernan (1888-1954), née Trevaskis, Neville John Laurence Heffernan was born at Hotham, Victoria on 12 July 1908.

He married Matilda Jane Howser (1909-1980) in 1933.

== Death ==
He died (suddenly) at West Footscray, Victoria on 6 February 1973.
