= Andrew Curtis (cricketer) =

English cricketer (born 1943)

Andrew David Curtis (born 1943) is a former English cricketer with Bedfordshire and Oxford University.

== Career ==
Andrew David Curtis was born on 12 January 1943 in Bedford and was educated at Elstow Primary School, Bedford Modern School,(playing in the School 1st teams for Cricket, Rugby and Rugby Fives,) the University of Sheffield and St Edmund Hall, Oxford. He played cricket for English Universities 1963–65, and both football and cricket for the Oxford University teams without gaining a Blue in either. His first-class cricket debut appearance was against Northamptonshire in the 1966 season where he was bowled by Peter Willey for 15. He played as a batsman for Bedfordshire in the Minor Counties Championship from 1964 to 1981, during which time the county won two Minor County championships and twice finished as runners up.

As a teacher his career embraced Head of Economics and Cricket Master, firstly at Hulme Grammar School, Oldham, and subsequently at Bedford Modern School, during which time they won the national schools' Lord's Taverners Trophy by defeating Rugby School at Edgbaston, and at Millfield School, where he coached and nurtured many pupils who went on to play first class county and Test match cricket. Following his retirement from teaching in 2004, he became Chairman of Somerset Cricket Board (and thereafter Somerset Cricket Foundation,) from 2005 -2021, Chairman of Somerset Schools Cricket Association, and a trustee of several local cricket charities helping young cricketers within the county.In 2021 he was made an Honorary Life Member of Somerset County Cricket Club for his services to cricket within the county.
