= Albert Pannam (footballer, born 1882) =

Australian rules footballer and umpire

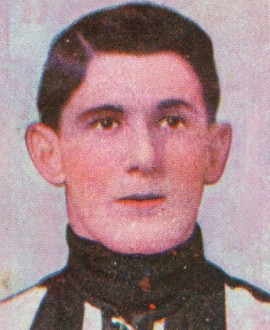
- Pannam in 1908

Personal information
- Full name: Albert Frederick Pannam
- Born: 2 July 1882; Beaconsfield, Tasmania, Australia
- Died: 22 August 1968 (aged 86); Parkville, Victoria, Australia
- Original team: Wynyard

Playing career^{1}
| Years | Club | Games (Goals) | |
| 1907–1909 | Collingwood | 28 (12) | |

Umpiring career
| Years | League | Role | Games |
| 1914–1921 | VFL | Boundary umpire | 12 |
- ^{1} Playing statistics correct to the end of 1909.

Albert Frederick Pannam (2 July 1882 – 22 August 1968) was an Australian rules footballer who played with Collingwood in the Victorian Football League (VFL). He was also a field and boundary umpire between 1914 and 1929.

== Football career ==
Pannam, who made his debut in the 1907 VFL season, played 13 games in each of his first two years at Collingwood, both of which ended with participation in semi final loses. He made just two appearances in 1909 before leaving the club and applying, unsuccessfully, to join a VFA club.

He was the brother of Australian rules legend Charlie, Sr., as well as the uncle of namesake Alby and dual premiership player Charlie Pannam Jr.

== Umpiring ==
Pannam was appointed to the VFL list of umpires in 1914 and made his debut as a boundary umpire in round 4 at the East Melbourne Cricket Ground in the Essendon v. Richmond match. He was appointed only as a boundary umpire that year compiling 10 matches. The following year he umpired three country matches between 29 May and 19 June.

He was quickly acquainted with the difficulties of country umpiring as his first match, played at Wandin, was delayed by the arrival of the visitors and he missed his train home back to Melbourne. Some weeks later he received praise from the local press for his handling of the Sale v. Traralgon match, but from this point it is unclear what Pannam undertook before he again appears on the umpiring scene in 1921. That year he returned to the VFL and officiated in two senior matches as a boundary umpire and 17 as a country field umpire. The highlights of the year were preliminary and grand finals in the Corangamite Football League. The following season, 1922, was his last with the VFL. He umpired 14 country matches bringing his totals to 12 VFL matches and 35 country.

Pannam moved to the VFA for three seasons in 1923, but was appointed irregularly during that initial year. He made his senior debut as a field umpire on 14 June 1924 - Geelong v. Brighton.

Moving to the Federal Association in 1928 he umpired the grand final on the boundary that year and completed his umpiring career at the end of 1929.
