= Harry Hardiman =

Australian rules footballer, born 1915

Personal information
- Full name: Harry Hardiman
- Born: 31 March 1915
- Died: 27 August 2012 (aged 97)
- Height: 184 cm (6 ft 0 in)
- Weight: 79 kg (174 lb)

Playing career^{1}
Years	Club	Games (Goals)
1935, 1938	North Melbourne	6 (5)
- ^{1} Playing statistics correct to the end of 1938.

Harry Hardiman (31 March 1915 – 27 August 2012) was an Australian rules footballer who played with North Melbourne in the Victorian Football League (VFL).
