= Jimmy Shand (footballer) =

Australian rules footballer (1893–1977)

Personal information
- Full name: Jimmy Shand
- Born: 2 August 1893
- Died: 13 January 1977 (aged 83)
- Original team: Balmain
- Height: 182 cm (6 ft 0 in)
- Weight: 70 kg (154 lb)

Playing career^{1}
Years	Club	Games (Goals)
1916–19	Richmond	40 (3)
- ^{1} Playing statistics correct to the end of 1919.

Jimmy Shand (2 August 1893 – 13 January 1977) was a former Australian rules footballer who played with Richmond in the Victorian Football League (VFL).
