= Umpire (Australian rules football) =

Sport official

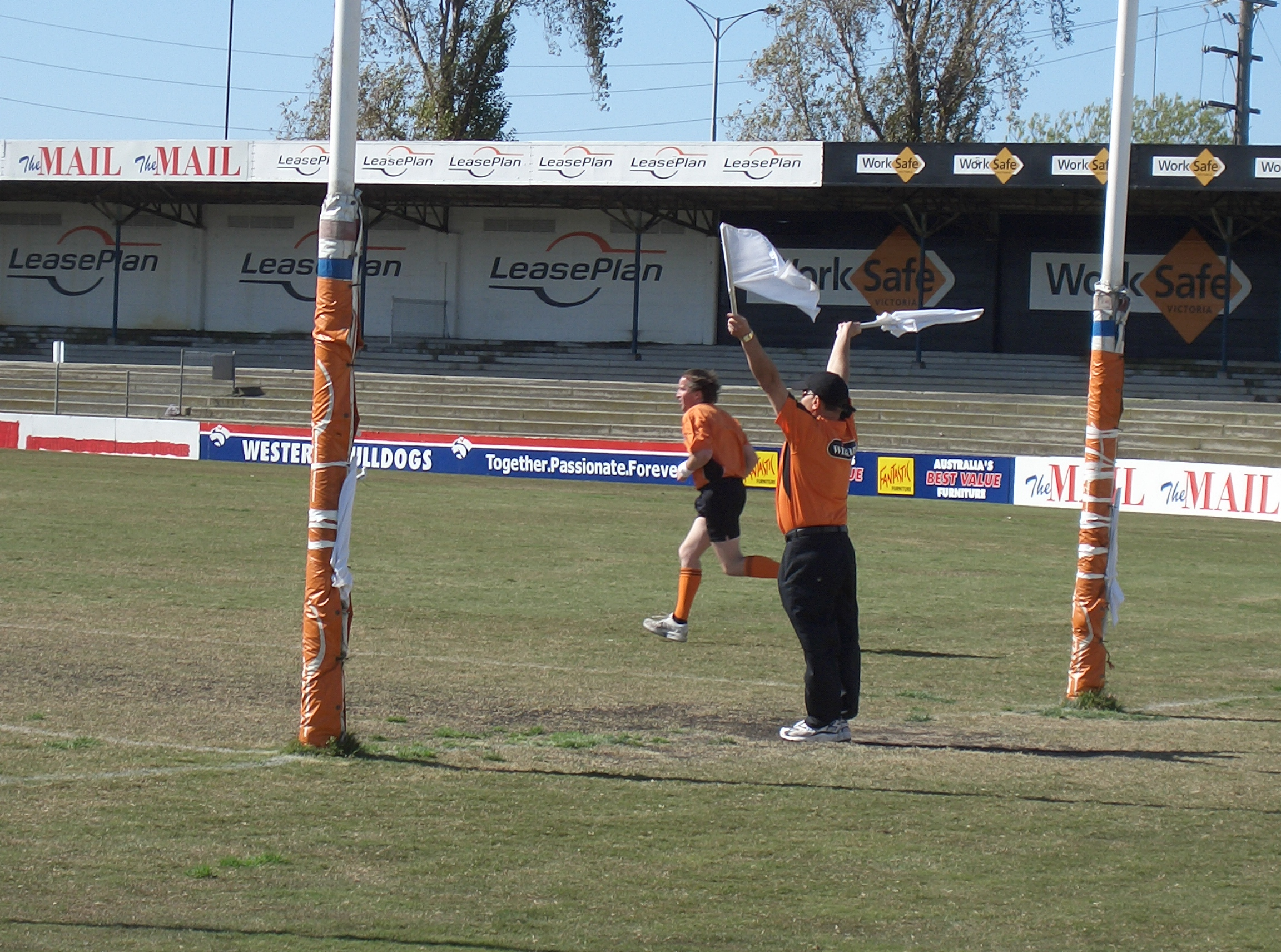
A goal umpire signalling a goal with two white flags, and a Boundary umpire.

An umpire is an official in the sport of Australian rules football who enforces the rules as outlined in the "Laws of the Game", the official handbook of Australian Rules Football. Umpiring across all levels the AFL (professional, amateur or juniors) has a long history of abuse. In recent years, the AFL has taken steps to address and reduce this issue.

== Origins ==
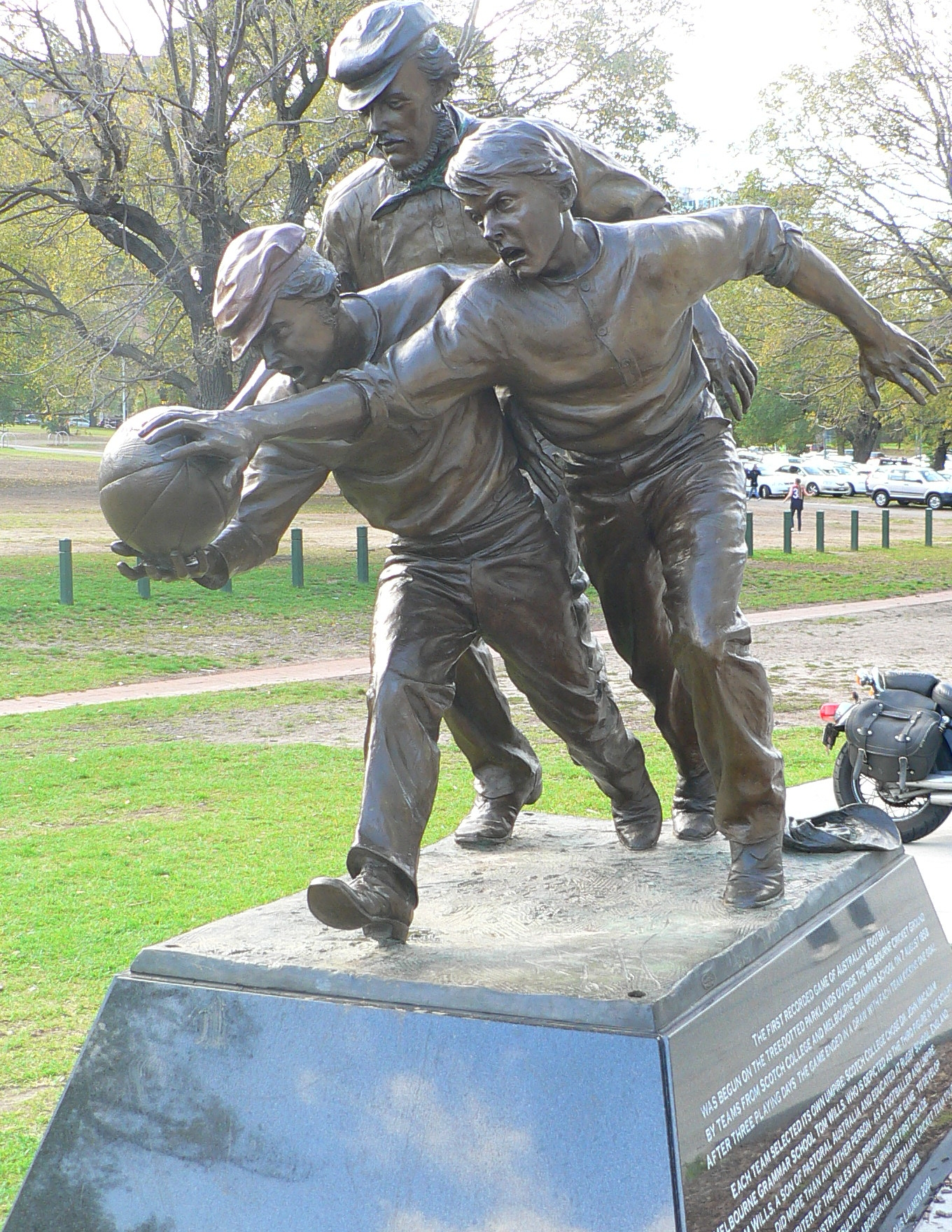
Statue of Tom Wills umpiring one of the earliest recorded matches of Australian rules football.

Unlike many other codes of football, where the official is called a referee, in Australian rules football the officials are called umpires. Tom Wills, one of the founders of the Australian game, was the earliest known umpire of a football match in Australia.

At first the captains of both teams shared the duty of officiating games, but as the game became more professional in the 1880s, umpires became an important aspect of the game.

=== Abuse ===
Banter and questioning the umpires decisions has been a feature of Australian rules football since the sport began. That questioning has at times become extreme, to the point where umpires have refused to umpire at some grounds.

In 1920, the VFL requested that police escort umpires off the field after games. Comments in the press about abuse of umpires and their competency was an early feature of the game.

== Types ==
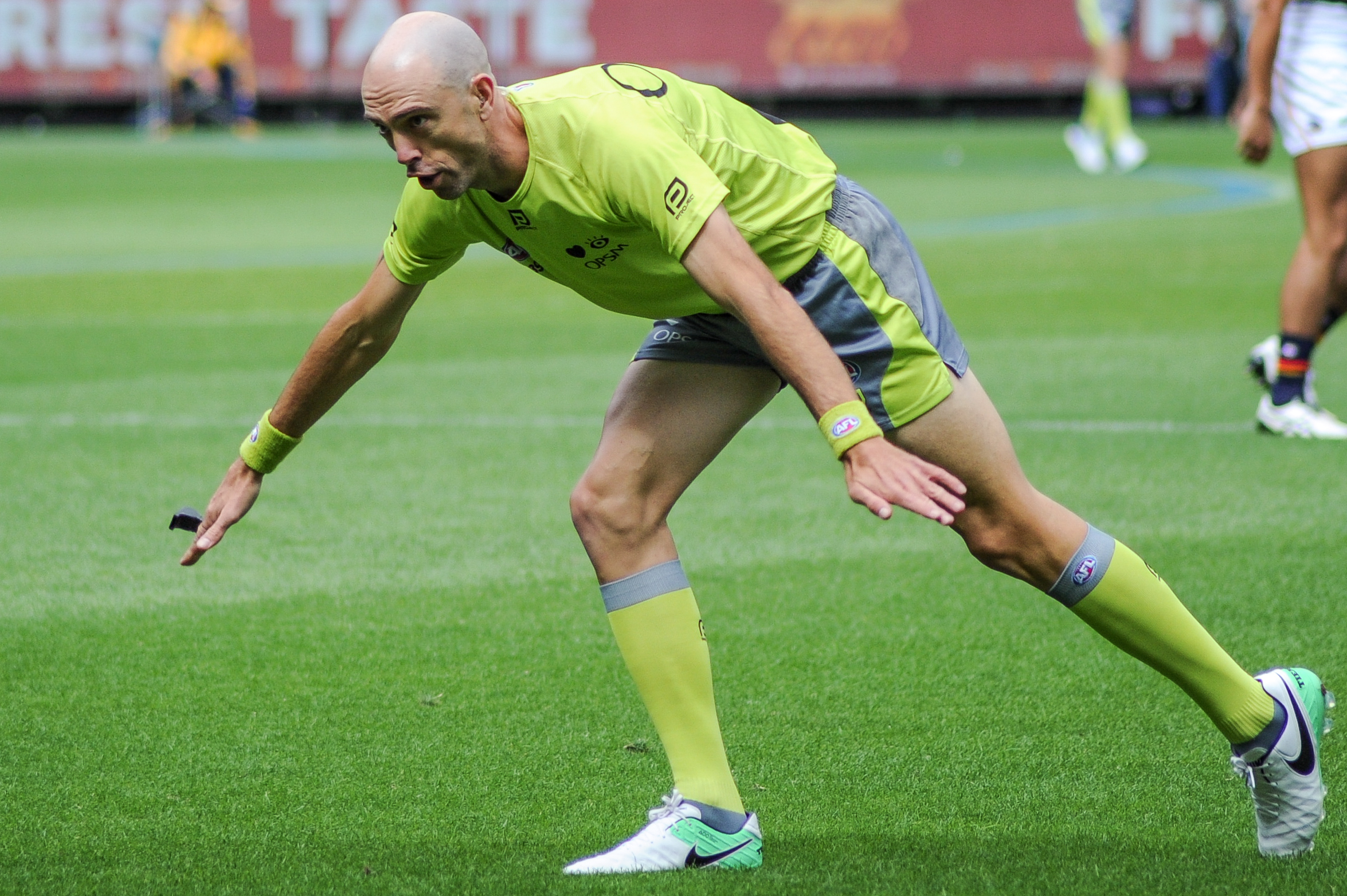
A field umpire signalling holding the ball.

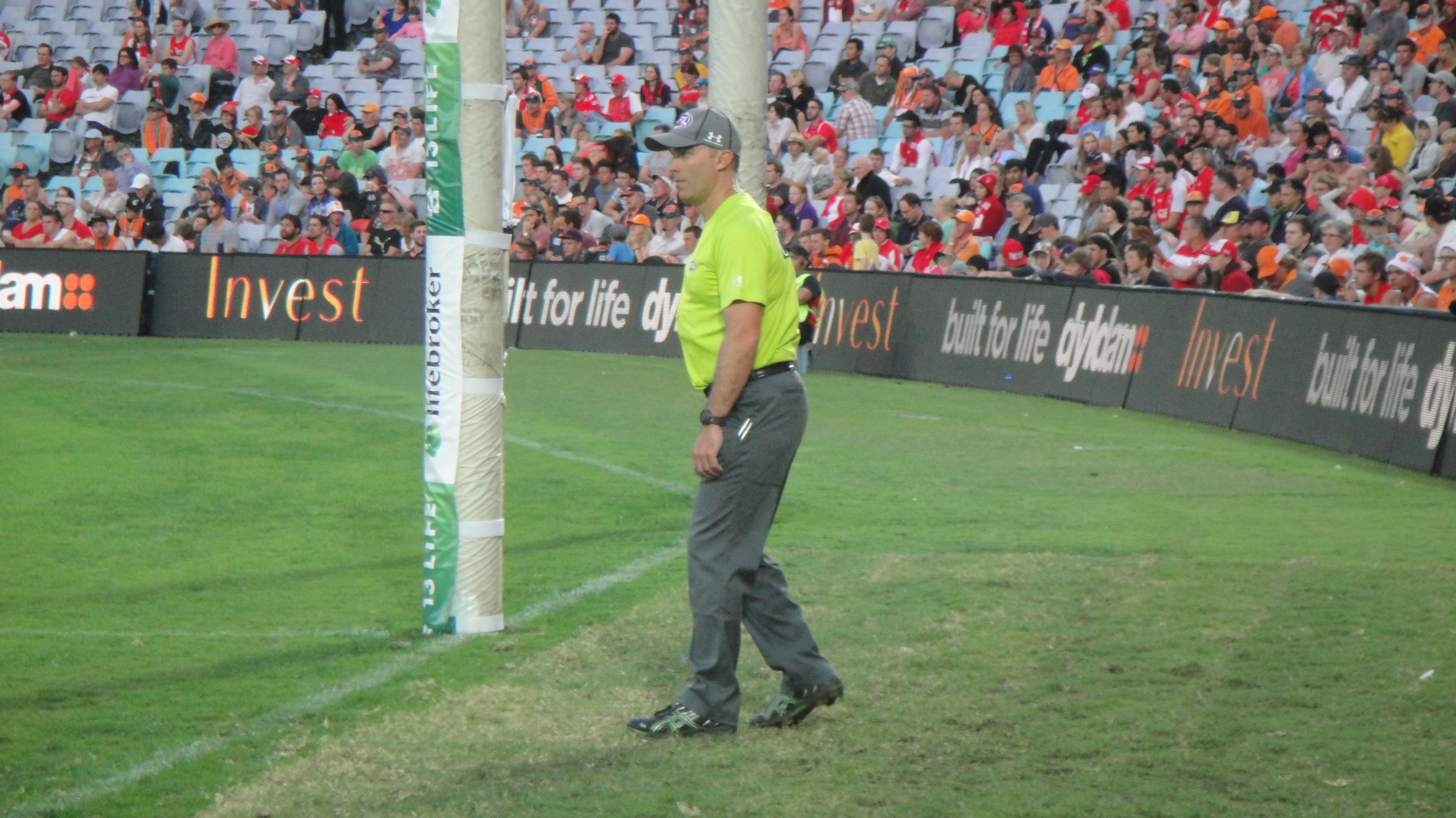
A goal umpire officiating between the goal posts at one end of the football field.

There are four different types of umpires and one type of steward in a typical game of Australian rules football:

- Field umpire – the field umpire (also known as a central umpire) is responsible controlling general play, and is positioned within the field of play. The field umpire is the only type of umpire permitted to award free kicks or initiate stoppages in play, and execute ball-ups to restart play.

Originally, only one field umpire controlled each game. In the VFL/AFL, this was increased to two in 1976, then to three in 1994, and then to four in 2023. Amateur, suburban, junior and semi-professional matches can be overseen by one to three field umpires.

- Goal umpire – goal umpires are responsible for all adjudications relating to the goal-line, to determine whether or not a ball has scored a goal, behind, or failed to cross the goal-line. Goal umpires also serve as the official score-keepers for the match. A goal umpire signals a score at their end of the ground by raising their index fingers in front of them at waist height, using one for a behind and two for a goal; then, the goal umpires at both ends wave flags to each to confirm and record the score. After each quarter, the umpires check their scores, and confirm that the ground scoreboard matches the official score.

There are generally two goal umpires in each game at all levels, one at each end of the ground; occasionally, the use of two goal umpires at each end of the ground has been trialled. Goal umpires traditionally wore a white jacket, black trousers and a broad-brimmed hat; however, in more recent times, caps and shirts have replaced the hats and jackets. They are the only umpires to wear headgear, their caps usually lime green or grey.

- Boundary umpire – the boundary umpire is responsible for determining when the ball has left the field of play, and whether it has done so on the bounce or on the full. The boundary umpire is responsible for throwing the ball back into play when it has left the field of play (a throw-in), and they assist the goal umpire when there is a set shot for goal by standing and observing from the behind post.

In the professional level Australian Football League, there are four boundary umpires in each match with two umpires sharing control of each side of the ground. At lower levels, there are typically only two or three boundary umpires.

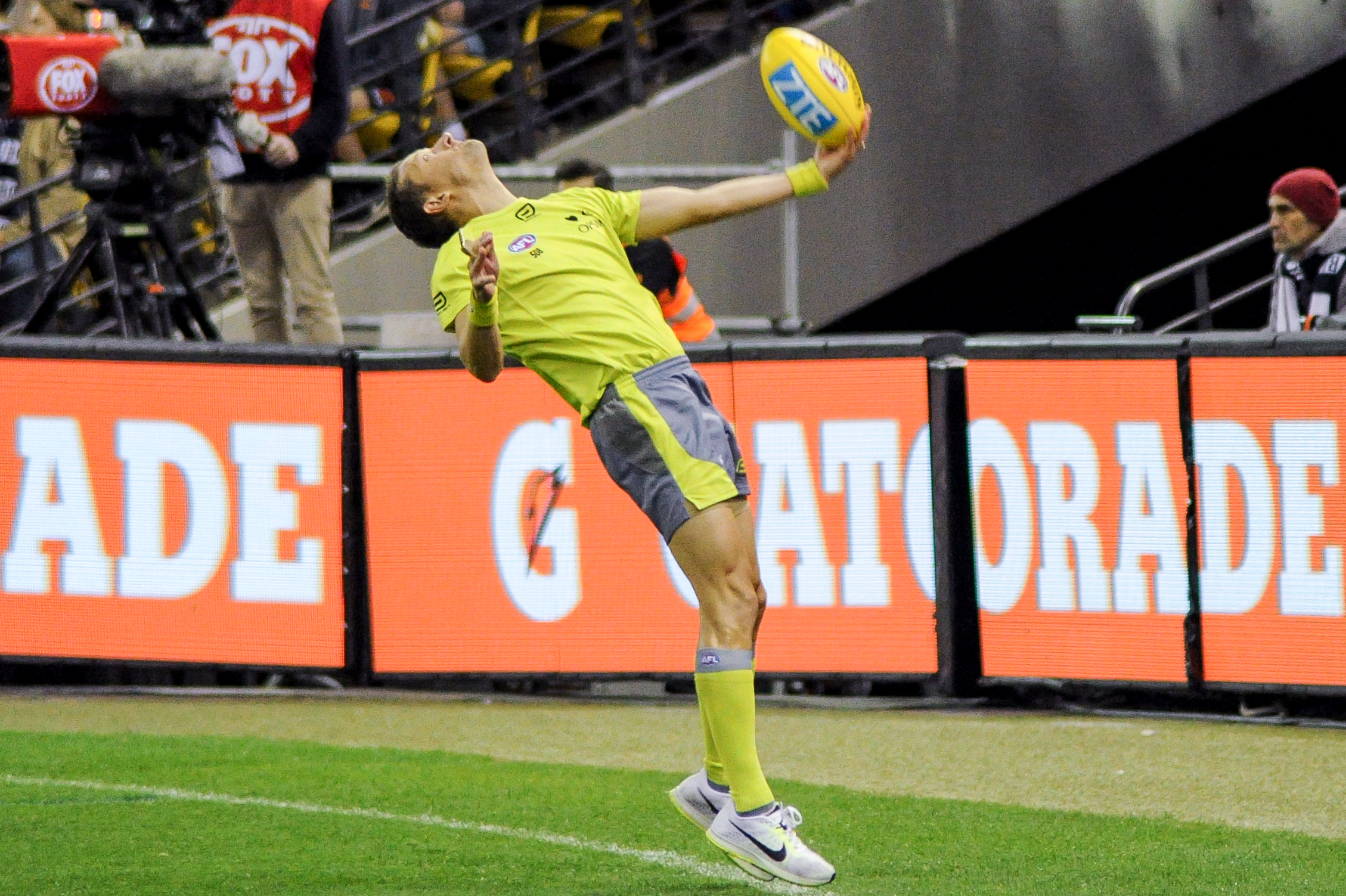
A boundary umpire throwing the football back into play.

- Emergency umpire – particularly in professional matches, an emergency umpire may be provided specifically to be used as a replacement if an umpire is injured. The emergency umpire can also monitor the play from the bench for behind-the-play incidents, and can enter the field if required to break up scuffles and fights between players and enforce the blood rule. Like field umpires, they have the ability to report (or in lower levels order off) players. The emergency umpire may also oversee other club officials, such as runners, and the interchanging of players.
- Interchange stewards – although they are not officially umpires, there are two of these at a professional match. They oversee the interchanging of players, and make sure that no more than 18 players per team are on the field at any one time. Where the league rules permit, stewards can report to the emergency umpire to allow free kicks to be paid for interchange infringements.

== Provision of umpires ==
At the professional level, and at other high levels of the game, all umpires and officials are provided by the league's umpiring department. At lower levels, it is common for the competing clubs to each provide one goal umpire and one boundary umpire to the match, but field umpires are still almost always provided by the league.

== Modern umpiring and the AFL ==
The game of Australian rules contains some "grey areas" where application of the laws is subject to interpretation, of degree or timing, making the job of field umpires difficult. Regular changes to laws or interpretations of rules by the AFL also contributes to the amount of work needed for umpires to maintain their skills and knowledge of the game. The umpires' director for the AFL is Jeff Gieschen, responsible for setting precedents for other affiliated leagues around the world.

== Attire ==
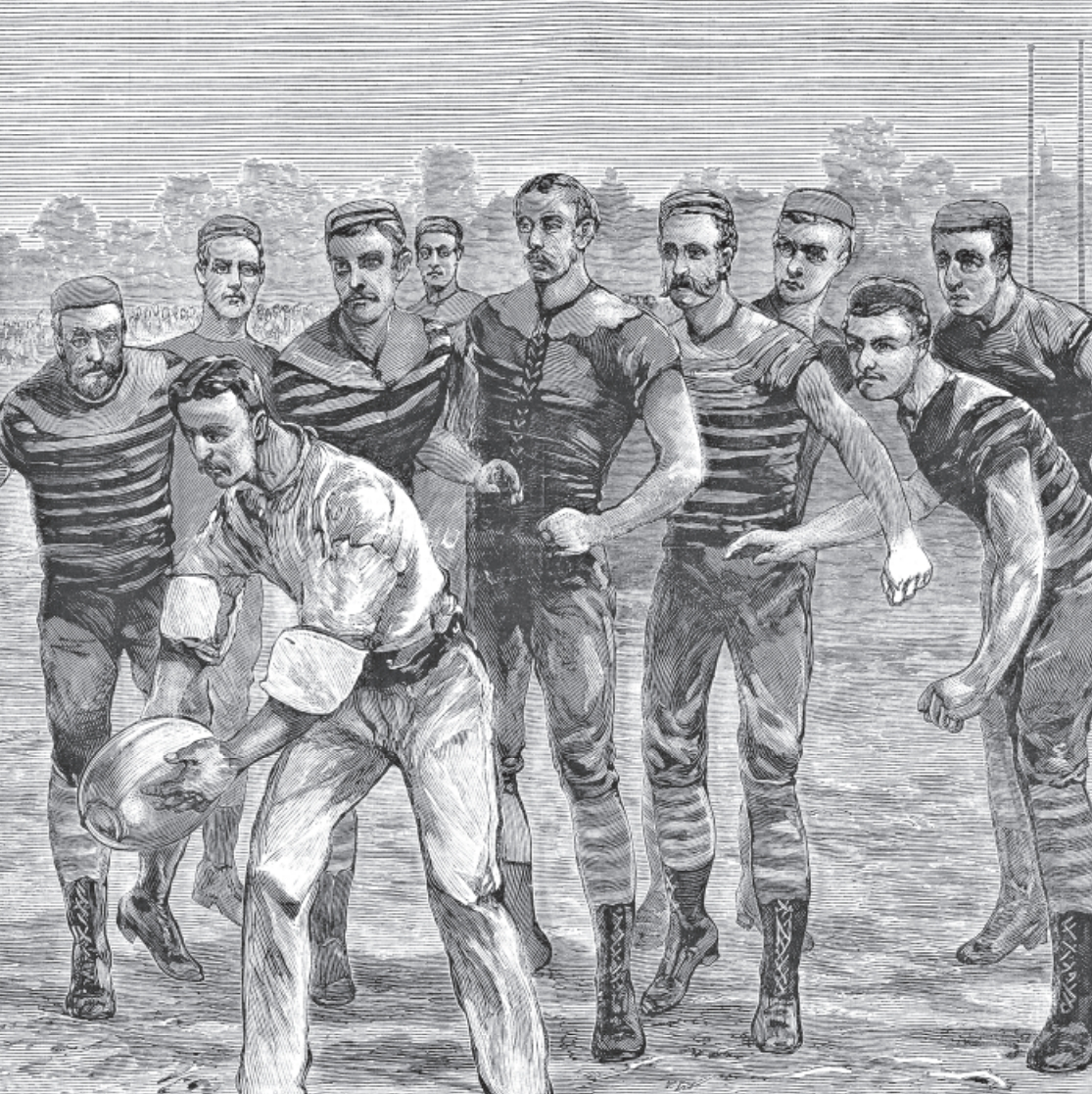
An umpire dressed in all white prepares a boundary throw-in, 1882. Two years earlier, George Coulthard, standing in middle of the group of players, became the first person to umpire a match in an all-white uniform.

Traditionally, Australian rules football umpires of all disciplines wore all-white uniforms. Goal umpires wore a more formal attire of white jacket (usually an overcoat), white hat, tie, and black slacks, as they were not required to actively run.

More recently, umpires have begun wearing uniforms of a distinctive colour to avoid a jersey clash with any of the competing teams. From 2013, all AFL umpires wore lime green uniforms with grey shorts or trousers to avoid a clash with any of the league's teams. However, where a team playing has jumpers featuring yellow, AFL umpires wear a blue uniform. Additionally, field umpires in the AFL are identifiable by a jersey number.

The most common historical pejorative term for an umpire, particularly a field umpire, was "white maggot", in reference to their historical white uniforms. Since then, the term is sometimes transferred to the colour the target umpire is wearing; for example, "green maggot" if the umpire is wearing a green shirt.

== See also ==
- List of Australian rules football umpires
