= List of Geelong Football Club players =

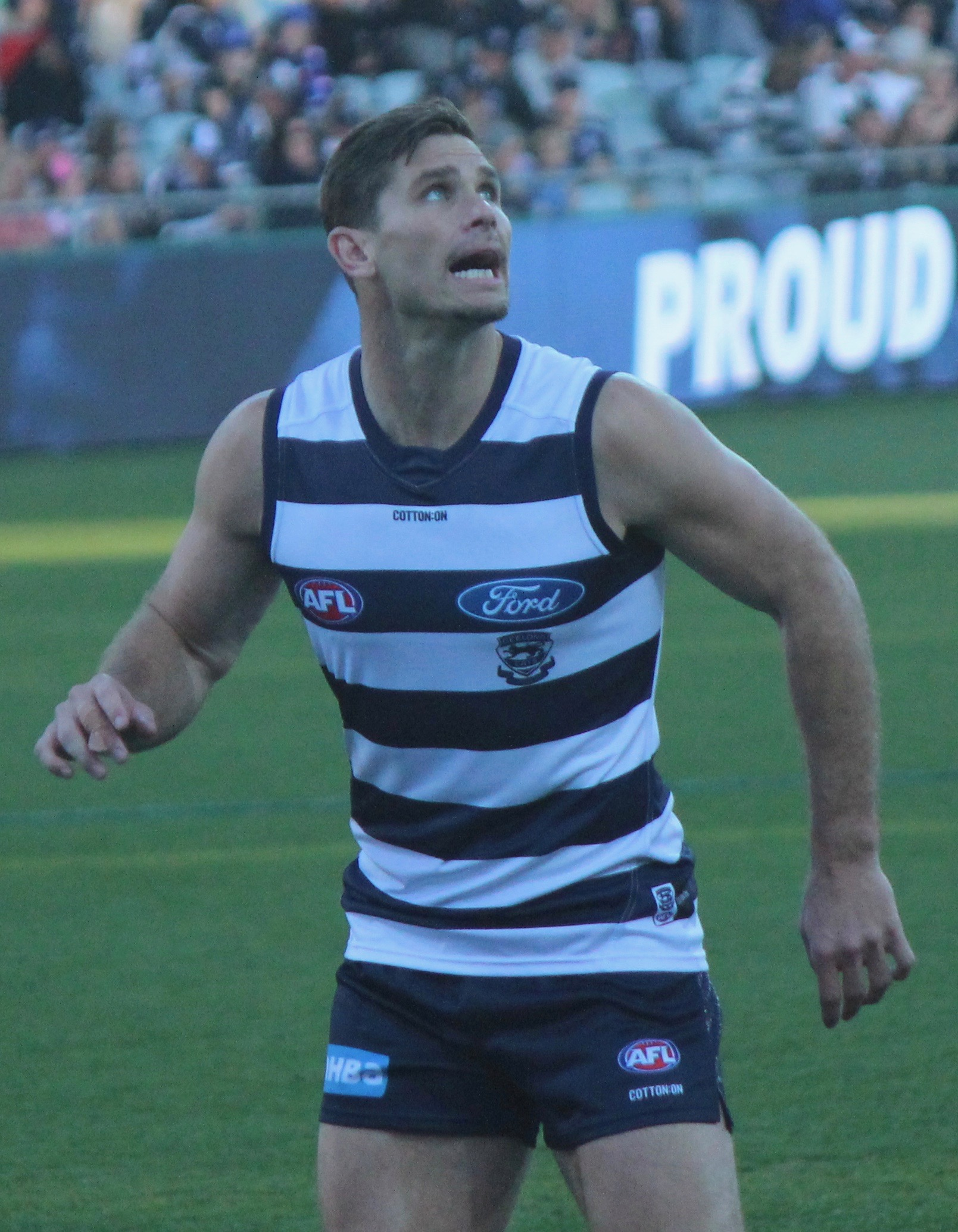
Tom Hawkins holds the record for the number of matches for the Geelong Football Club, retiring in 2024 after playing 359 matches.

Since becoming a foundation club of the Victorian Football League (VFL)—which is now known as the Australian Football League (AFL)—in 1897, there have been 1120 players who have represented the Geelong Football Club in a senior VFL/AFL match. A senior VFL/AFL match is an Australian rules football match between two clubs that are, or were at the time, members of the VFL/AFL. A senior VFL/AFL match is played under the laws of Australian football, and includes regular season matches, as well as finals series matches. It doesn't include pre-season competition matches, Night Series matches, interstate matches or international rules football matches. The list is arranged in the order in which each player made his debut for Geelong in a senior VFL/AFL match. Where more than one player made his debut in the same match, those players are listed alphabetically by surname.

Geelong's first game was played against the Essendon Football Club at Corio Oval in Geelong, Victoria. In this game they scored three goals and six points for a total of 24 points, and were defeated by Essendon who scored seven goals and five points for a total of 47 points. Geelong has contested 19 VFL/AFL Grand Finals, and have succeeded in winning 10 of these Grand Finals to claim the VFL/AFL premiership for those years. Their first premiership was won in the 1925 VFL Grand Final, with the most recent premiership being won in the 2022 AFL Grand Final. There were 123 players who have played in a premiership-winning side for Geelong before 2022, with the addition of 20 more players stemming from the 2022 premiership victory.

== Players ==
Key
Order	Players are listed in order of debut
Seasons	Spans from the season of the player's debut to the year in which they played their final game for Geelong and have since been removed from the playing list
Games	Statistics are for AFL regular season and finals series matches only and are correct to the end of the 2025 season
Goals	Statistics are for AFL regular season and finals series matches only and are correct to the end of the 2025 season
^{^}	Currently listed players

=== 1890s ===
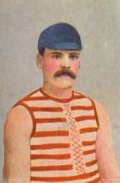
Australian Football Hall of Fame member Peter Burns was a part of Geelong's inaugural team in 1897.

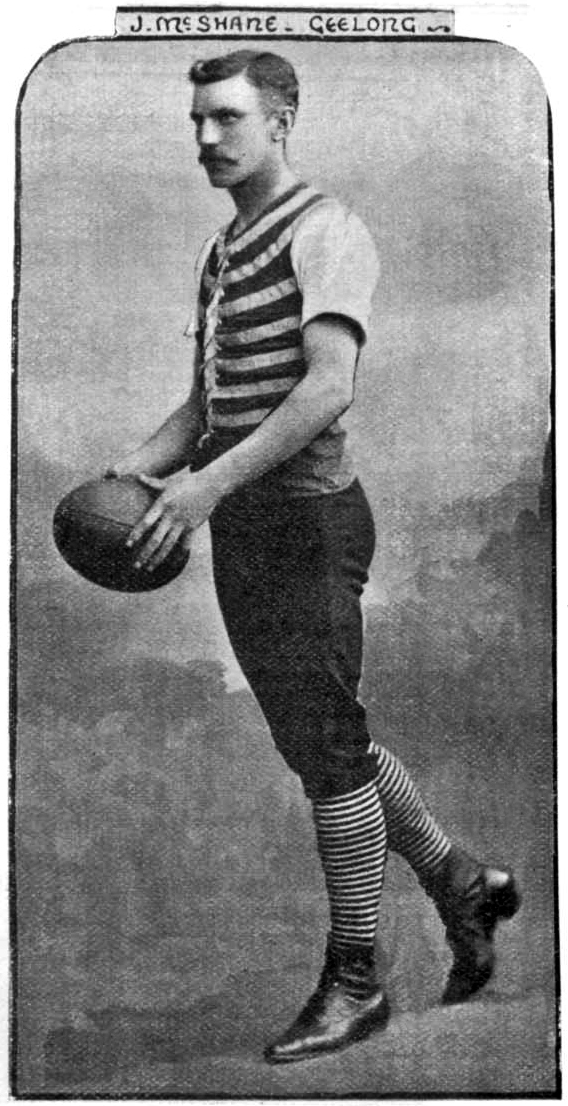
Jim McShane played 82 games for Geelong between 1897 and 1901.

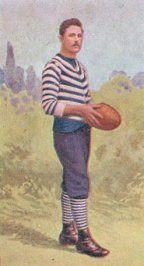
Teddy Rankin was part of Geelong's inaugural team in 1897, and, in 1903, became the first Geelong player to play 100 games.

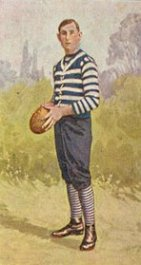
Charles Coles played 72 games for Geelong between 1897 and 1904.

Players who made their debut for the Geelong Football Club in the 1890s
Order	Name	Seasons	Games	Goals
1	Peter Burns	1897–1902	89	7
2	Jack Conway	1897–1899	51	0
3	Teddy Holligan	1897–1901, 1903	84	29
4	Eddy James	1897–1900	46	85
5	Paddy Leahy	1897–1900	17	0
6	John Lucas	1897	1	0
7	Tom Maguire	1897–1898	13	0
8	Firth McCallum	1897–1903, 1905	74	25
9	Bill McKay	1897	2	0
10	Henry McShane	1897–1898	31	1
11	Jim McShane	1897–1901	82	53
12	Joe McShane	1897–1901	75	30
13	Tom Mullen	1897	1	0
14	Jack Parkin	1897–1899	50	11
15	Bob Paterson	1897	2	0
16	Billy Pincott	1897, 1899	17	0
17	Alf Pontin	1897	13	1
18	Jack Quinn	1897–1898	21	16
19	Teddy Rankin	1897, 1899–1910	180	35
20	Archie Thompson	1897–1901	61	14
21	Stan Enfield	1897	3	3
22	Jack Sharkey	1897	1	0
23	Sam Brockwell	1897–1898	29	0
24	Charlie Coles	1897–1898, 1900–04	72	81
25	Jim Flynn	1897–1902	72	22
26	Henry Young	1897–1910	167	76
27	Bert Barling	1897–1898	16	4
28	Mac Armstrong	1897	4	0
29	Arthur Pincott	1897–1900, 1902–03	72	0
30	Fred White	1897–1899	28	28
31	Cecil Sandford	1897–1898	8	1
32	Jimmy Palmer	1897, 1899–1902	53	8
33	Ned Moran	1897	2	0
34	Ted Greeves	1897–1899	20	2
35	Jack O'Loughlin	1898, 1901	22	1
36	Walter Cooke	1898	9	1
37	Alf Dear	1898–1899	22	3
38	Bill Robertson	1898	1	0
39	Dick Walker	1898	14	10
40	Jack Dore	1898	5	0
41	Ernie Leighton	1898–1899	29	18
42	Les Bailiff	1898, 1900–03	63	0
43	Ernest Anderson	1898	1	0
44	Alec King	1898	6	3
45	Ossie Calvert	1898	2	0
46	Arthur McKenzie	1898	4	0
47	Tommy Buchan	1899–1902	41	20
48	George Lockwood	1899–1901	40	7
49	Teddy Lockwood	1899–1901	45	61
50	Pat O'Donnell	1899	1	0
51	Norman Belcher	1899, 1902, 1906	8	3
52	Harry Parkin	1899	2	0

=== 1900s ===
Players who made their debut for the Geelong Football Club in the 1900s
Order	Name	Seasons	Games	Goals
53	Bill de Gruchy	1900	1	0
54	Mick Donaghy	1900–1905	80	3
55	Jack Hardiman	1900–1901	21	11
56	James Horman	1900–1902	31	2
57	Joe Powell	1900–1901	17	0
58	Robert Stanlake	1900	1	0
59	Len Strickland	1900	5	0
60	Harold Collocott	1900	1	0
61	James Gatehouse	1900	1	0
62	Ernest Newling	1900–1910	150	22
63	Heber Quinton	1900	1	0
64	Hughie Webb	1900, 1902–1903	22	4
65	Ted Holland	1900–1902	31	4
66	Jack Baker	1901–1902	7	7
67	Frank Bowey	1901–1904, 1909	44	5
68	Tim McKeegan	1901–1902	13	0
69	Bill Moodie	1901	4	6
70	Billy Gill	1901–1902	7	1
71	Don Lord	1901	2	0
72	George Palmer	1901	1	0
73	Ike Woods	1901–1906	68	108
74	Percy Fletcher	1901, 1903–1906	47	4
75	George Saxbee	1901	1	0
76	Bill Bennion	1901–1904	48	6
77	Bill Eason	1902–1915	220	187
78	Bill Mahoney	1902	17	11
79	Alec McKenzie	1902–1908	87	18
80	Arthur Reed	1902	14	2
81	Ern Batty	1902	9	1
82	Jack Davie	1902	1	0
83	Bill Munday	1902	1	0
84	Jim Beasley	1902	7	2
85	Tom McLean	1902–1904	12	0
86	Ivan Forbes	1902–1905	40	51
87	Edward Potter	1902	6	4
88	Peter Stephens	1902–1908	102	22
89	Bert Hall	1902	1	1
90	John Hurley	1902	3	1
91	Herb Pitman	1902	5	0
92	Jack Wright	1902–1906	53	8
93	Fred Cronin	1902–1903	7	1
94	Bob Kerr	1902–1903	5	1
95	Tom Shelley	1902	1	0
96	Willie Hines	1903	7	5
97	Artie Hopkins	1903, 1905	5	0
98	Gordon Kearney	1903	6	0
98	Stan Wayth	1903	1	0
100	Bill McKinley	1903–1908	52	0
101	James Aitken	1903	1	0
102	Jack Lee	1903	3	0
103	Arthur Mesley	1903	9	0
104	Frank Stodart	1903–1905, 1908	30	2
105	Horrie Quinton	1903–1905	35	4
106	Ken Clarke	1903–1905	24	9
107	Dick Grigg	1904–1914, 1921	194	64
108	Tom Rankin	1904–1906	47	12
109	Jimmy Roberts	1904	1	0
110	Con Molan (Note: Also known as Henry Molan and Con Ryan)	1904, 1907–1908	9	1
111	Bert Clarke	1904	4	3
112	George Horman	1904	1	0
113	Jim Munday, Sr.	1904–1906	33	1
114	George Doull	1904–1911	96	16
115	Jack Knell	1904–1906	32	12
116	Peter McMurrich	1904	1	0
117	Bill Burns	1904	2	0
118	Reg Digby	1904	2	1
119	Joe Fox	1904	2	0
120	Mick Holligan	1904–1905	6	3
121	Henry Cheeseman	1904	1	1
122	Les Roebuck	1905–1908	35	43
123	Joe Kelly	1905	1	0
124	John McInnes	1905	1	2
125	Jim Piper	1905	1	0
126	Walter Stewart	1905	2	0
127	Alf Millar	1905	5	3
128	Alf Gough	1905–1907	44	13
129	Bill Brown	1905	1	0
130	Ern James	1905–1906	7	4
131	Johnny Murphy	1905–1906	3	0
132	Herb Williams	1905	1	0
133	Joe Crowl	1906	4	0
134	Len Martin	1906, 1910–1913	61	24
135	Percy Scown	1906–1914	121	2
136	George Leggett	1906	2	0
137	Les Fairbairn	1906, 1910–1914	68	20
138	Dave Beard	1906, 1908–1911	38	12
139	Alby Palmer	1906–1907, 1909–1911	49	1
140	John Bell	1906, 1908	18	1
141	Alf Dupe	1906–1907	8	5
142	Dave Ryan	1906	2	0
143	Edgar Stubbs	1906	5	3
144	Tom Gibney	1906	7	5
145	Jim Harper	1906	4	1
146	Billy Gallagher	1906	4	1
147	Alf Horman	1906	2	1
148	John McKenzie	1906	2	1
149	Henry Fischer	1906	3	0
150	Norm Fletcher	1906–1907	3	0
151	Billy Orchard	1906, 1908–1915	112	67
152	Joe Slater	1906–1914	108	17
153	Jack Wighton	1906	2	0
154	Norman Davison	1906	1	1
155	Bill Getsom	1906–1907	5	2
156	Frank Boynton	1907	13	2
157	George McNeilage	1907	5	1
158	Jim McNeilage	1907	7	2
159	Billy Miller	1907, 1909	9	1
160	Jack Allen	1907	8	0
161	Tom Hardiman	1907–1908	31	39
162	Nick Marshall	1907–1908	4	0
163	Tom Sherry	1907	13	18
164	Ralph Upton	1907	1	0
165	Jack Hassett	1907–1909	34	29
166	Frank Moran	1907–1911	65	3
167	Alf Day	1907	7	1
168	Hugh McKay	1907–1908	9	1
169	Herb Bennett	1907–1908	8	1
170	Rupe Brownlees	1908–1909, 1911–1915, 1919	100	4
171	Charlie Cameron	1908–1910	46	5
172	Les Gell	1908	6	5
173	Bill Davern	1908	3	2
174	Jack Green	1908	2	0
175	George Tansing	1908	5	2
176	Bert Bourchier	1908	1	0
177	Alex Boyd	1908–1910	30	0
178	Norm McGorlick	1908	3	2
179	Percy Salmon	1908–1909	17	7
180	Jack Pender	1908	4	0
181	Les Armstrong	1908–1915, 1917–1920	175	2
182	Johnny Keon	1908	4	1
183	Les Chisholm	1908–1909	3	0
184	Tom Dickson	1908	2	0
185	Bert Whittington	1908–1911	27	3
186	Billy Wilton	1908–1909, 1914	20	8
187	Fred James	1908	2	1
188	Robert Ritchie	1908	2	0
189	Les James	1909–1911, 1913–1915	72	14
190	Les Batty	1909	17	0
191	Bert Dalton	1909–1915	60	0
192	Harry Marsham	1909–1915, 1917–1919	129	63
193	Bill Woods	1909	2	0
194	Jack Arbrew	1909	1	0
195	Doug Morgan	1909–1911	18	3
196	Percy Martini	1909–1915, 1917–1920	148	333
197	Alec Eason	1909–1915, 1919–1921	150	80
198	Jack Watt	1909, 1911–1912	31	7

=== 1910s ===
Players who made their debut for the Geelong Football Club in the 1910s
Order	Name	Seasons	Games	Goals
199	George Heinz	1910–1914	87	71
200	George Ricketts	1910	3	0
201	Bert Glover	1910	1	1
202	Reg Todd	1910	2	0
203	Basil Collins	1910–1912, 1914–1915, 1917–1921	62	10
204	Christy Gorman	1910	1	2
205	Neil Freeman	1910–1914	45	1
206	Sid Smith, Sr.	1911	5	4
207	Norm Grigg	1911	4	1
208	Tom Martin	1911	5	5
209	Leo Healy	1911–1914, 1919–1920	75	23
210	Jack Gray	1911–1915, 1917–1919, 1921	77	8
211	Alan Cordner	1911–1912	3	0
212	Bert Schofield	1911–1913	11	6
213	Charlie Armstrong	1912	15	3
214	Bert Rankin	1912–1915, 1917–1923	132	21
215	Laurie Pender	1912	13	0
216	Chris Bant	1912	3	0
217	Edmund Webber	1912–1913	6	3
218	Ted McLean	1912	2	0
219	Stephen Nankervis	1912–1913	4	2
220	Tom Brownlees	1913–1915, 1917–1922	116	106
221	Joe Holligan	1913	2	0
222	Billy McCarter	1913–1915, 1921–1924	114	7
223	Jack Baker	1913–1915, 1917	55	17
224	Alwyn Johns	1913–1915, 1917–1920	80	29
225	Bill Moulden	1914, 1917–1920	34	2
226	Harry Allen	1914–1915, 1919	20	6
227	Gordon Burleigh	1914	1	1
228	Harold Conradi	1914	1	0
229	Jack Blencowe	1914	2	2
230	Percy Ellingsen	1915, 1917–1919	36	52
231	Jim Kearney	1915, 1917–1921	72	17
232	Bill Jones	1915	3	0
233	Stan Thomas	1915, 1917–1925	137	6
234	Vin Maguire	1915, 1917–1919	43	8
235	Dick Stokes	1915, 1917	12	1
236	Jamie Thompson	1915	12	0
237	George Gill	1915	7	0
238	Ossy Armstrong	1915	3	0
239	Jack Audsley	1915	2	0
240	Harold Craven	1915, 1917–1922, 1924	90	17
241	Frank Hodgins	1915, 1917–1918	12	2
242	Cliff Rankin	1915, 1919–1928	153	400
243	Bill Landy	1915	2	1
244	Norm MacKay	1917–1918	21	5
245	Leo Tasker	1917	5	2
246	Tom Brady	1917–1919	17	14
247	Bert Davie	1917–1919	27	1
248	Gus McLennan	1917	1	0
249	Eric Peck	1917–1921	50	9
250	George Hope	1917–1919	21	0
251	Lloyd Hagger	1917–1927, 1929	174	389
252	Duncan Moodie	1918	12	0
253	Ambrose Maher	1918	10	3
254	Tommy Peterson	1918	1	0
255	Jack Sheridan	1918	1	0
256	Ern Everett	1918	1	0
257	Bill Bendle	1918–1919, 1921	14	6
258	Bill Gliddon	1918	1	0
259	Vic Gross	1919–1922	39	2
260	Keith Johns	1919, 1921–1923, 1925	64	13
261	Reg Sutterby	1919	9	1
262	Max Kroger	1919–1922, 1924	42	5
263	Syd James	1919	5	1
264	Jack Ross	1919	2	0
265	John Clemenger	1919–1921	20	16
266	Doy Reed	1919	4	7
267	Bruce Anderson	1919	2	0
268	Herbie Smith (Note: Also known as Tommy Smith)	1919–1921	38	0
269	Les Stephens	1919–1920	7	7

=== 1920s ===
Players who made their debut for the Geelong Football Club in the 1920s
Order	Name	Seasons	Games	Goals
270	Phil McQueen	1920	2	1
271	Jack Ross	1920–1922	33	1
272	Jockie Jones	1920–1926	59	55
273	Jack Murrell	1920–1922	36	0
274	Arthur Hewitson	1920	4	3
275	Jack Paterson	1920, 1924–1926	23	10
276	Bill Jones	1920	4	0
277	Jim Mathieson	1920–1924	71	37
278	Jim Mellan	1920	8	3
279	Wallace Sharland	1920–1925	49	41
280	Jock Lineen	1921	1	0
281	Neville Rollason	1921–1922	5	3
282	Ed Feder	1921	2	0
283	Bill Keane	1921–1923	29	21
284	Vic Buchanan	1921	1	0
285	Harold Manson	1921	1	0
286	Les Smith	1921–1929	123	17
287	Alby Bendle	1922	13	1
288	Arthur Coghlan	1922–1925, 1927–1932	145	10
289	Eric Fleming	1922–1928	105	112
290	Charlie Plane	1922–1925	42	5
291	Val Marchesi	1922	15	4
292	Edward Stevenson	1922–1929	105	30
293	Harry Smith	1922	3	2
294	George 'Jocka' Todd	1922–1934	232	54
295	Syd Hall	1922–1927, 1930	85	18
296	Bill Hudd	1922–1925	28	3
297	Jack Dunstone	1923	14	2
298	Ray Ellis	1923	2	0
299	Roy Fleming	1923, 1926	13	10
300	Stan McGregor	1923	2	0
301	Arthur Pink	1923–1925	34	22
302	George Harris	1923	4	2
303	Nick Brushfield	1923–1927	41	10
304	Frank Jorgensen	1923–1924	14	4
305	Ken Nicolson	1923–1924	23	7
306	Edward Greeves, Jr.	1923–1931, 1933	124	17
307	Jimmy Rodgers	1923	6	0
308	Alec Tayler	1923	5	0
309	Vic Profitt	1924–1925	4	1
310	Jack Chambers	1924–1928	72	59
311	Harry Britter	1924	1	0
312	Dave Ferguson	1924–1925, 1927–1928	39	5
313	Frank Murrells	1924–1925	4	1
314	Arthur Rayson	1924–1931	101	127
315	Jim Warren	1925–1928	57	58
316	Jack Williams	1925–1934	175	9
317	Tom Fitzmaurice	1925–1928	49	20
318	Ken Leahy	1925–1927	29	4
319	Frank Mockridge	1925–1931	72	2
320	Denis Heagney	1925–1926	6	1
321	George Jerram	1926–1929	67	31
322	Aubrey Comben	1926–1928	6	2
323	Cyril Mulroyan	1926–1929	11	1
324	Don Hickey	1926	2	0
325	Reg Hickey	1926–1940	245	24
326	Les Laver	1926, 1928, 1931–1932	8	0
327	Bruce Mills	1926	9	3
328	Bill Taylor	1926	8	10
329	Ted Baker	1927–1932	95	101
330	Rod Lucas	1927, 1929	7	2
331	Peter Hardiman	1927–1938	160	45
332	Frank Keppel	1927–1930	40	3
333	Cleve McDiarmid	1927	6	4
334	Jack Plunkett	1928–1930	26	58
335	Joe Roach	1928	1	0
336	Andy Carroll	1928–1929	10	3
337	Charlie Fowler	1928	5	7
338	Jim Money	1928	2	1
339	Len Vautier	1928–1930, 1932	21	8
340	Garnet Lamb	1928–1929	9	0
341	Len Clearson	1928	4	2
342	Milton Lamb	1928–1932	72	1
343	Arch Bell	1928	1	0
344	Milton White	1928–1929	6	0
345	Jack Evans	1929–1938	149	146
346	Ralph Lancaster	1929–1932, 1935	44	34
347	Jack Collins	1929–1934, 1938	112	112
348	Ewen Bumpstead	1929–1930	5	4
349	Ted Llewellyn	1929–1931	38	23
350	Les Hardiman	1929–1937	135	236
351	Peter Bretherton	1929	3	0
352	Percy Jones	1929	2	3
353	Rupe McDonald	1929–1935	111	2
354	Russell Madden	1929, 1931	3	0
355	Mac Stokes	1929–1931	9	2
356	Bill Welsh	1929–1930	5	0

=== 1930s ===
Players who made their debut for the Geelong Football Club in the 1930s
Order	Name	Seasons	Games	Goals
357	Jack Carney	1930–1934	79	4
358	Bill Kuhlken	1930–1936	80	101
359	Len Metherell	1930–1936	110	117
360	Bob Troughton	1930–1935	92	100
361	Jack Walker	1930–1935	76	3
362	Clive Coles	1930–1931, 1933–1938	109	76
363	Joe Sellwood	1930–1941, 1944–1945	180	97
364	Ted Riches	1930	1	0
365	Teddy Jones	1930	1	0
366	George Moloney	1931–1935	88	303
367	Tommy Quinn	1931–1940	168	169
368	Max Kelly	1931, 1933	21	1
369	Fred Hawking	1932–1938, 1941	102	18
370	Clete Turner	1932	5	0
371	Harold Maskell	1932	9	0
372	Jim Harbison	1932	5	3
373	Gus Leishman	1932–1934	27	14
374	Bill Anderson	1932	6	0
375	Alan Lavery	1932–1933	6	0
376	Jack Metherell	1932–1937	65	221
377	Tom MacKay	1932, 1935	9	11
378	Angie Muller	1933–1941	115	37
379	Eric Orr	1933	11	2
380	Tom Stapleton	1933, 1935	6	0
381	Reg Gross	1933, 1935, 1939	16	0
382	Tom Arklay	1933–1941, 1944	137	45
383	Joe Tucker	1933–1936, 1938–1939	24	17
384	Bob Walker	1933–1936, 1938–1939	14	1
385	Ron Barling	1933	1	0
386	Lindsay Lamb	1933, 1935	4	1
387	Jim Williamson	1933–1934	2	0
388	Lou Daily	1934	19	28
389	Alex McGregor	1934–1935	32	7
390	Norm Glenister	1934–1940, 1945–1946	124	262
391	Allan Everett	1934–1940	117	25
392	Jack Lyons	1934	3	1
393	Jack Holden	1935	4	0
394	Jim Nash	1935–1936, 1939–1940	44	6
395	Laurie Slack	1935–1940	77	11
396	Billy Plunkett	1935	8	22
397	Frank Holden	1935–1936	5	4
398	Neil Tucker	1935–1941, 1944	61	20
399	Billy Blair	1935	2	0
400	Bill Borwick	1935	1	0
401	Leo Dean	1935–1941, 1944–1945	60	1
402	Vic Harrison	1935	2	0
403	Jim Allen	1935	1	0
404	Jack Grant	1935–1941, 1945–1946	119	99
405	Gordon Abbott	1936–1938	50	27
406	Charlie Dibbs	1936	7	0
407	Frank Johnson	1936–1937	8	1
408	Jack Gaudion	1936	4	2
409	Nick Muller	1935, 1940	10	0
410	Bernie Hore	1936–1940	60	2
411	Ashley Foley	1936–1938	15	2
412	Geoff Mahon	1936–1940, 1946	82	35
413	Jim Pender	1936	1	0
414	George Dougherty	1936–1941, 1944–1945	121	188
415	Jim Wills	1937–1938, 1940	26	16
416	Bernie Miller	1937	6	0
417	Clyde Helmer	1937–1941	71	137
418	Stan Howard	1937–1941	54	1
419	Stan Mullane	1937	1	0
420	Bill Dyer	1937–1938	19	1
421	Jack Butcher	1938–1941, 1944–1945	86	18
422	Doug Rankin	1938–1939	9	8
423	Cliff Taylor	1938	10	0
424	Keith Milte	1938	1	0
425	Ted Tuohill	1938–1940	11	10
426	Mick Glenister	1939–1941	39	9
427	George Gniel	1939–1941, 1944–1947	114	11
428	Alan Marsham	1939–1940, 1945–1946	24	5
429	Jim Knight	1939–1941	42	54
430	Jack Lynch	1939–1940	25	39
431	Colin Graham	1939, 1941, 1944–1945	30	16
432	Rupe Bethune	1939–1941	29	3
433	Pat Leahy	1939, 1944	20	9
434	Geoff Organ	1939	1	0
435	Percy Taylor	1939–1941	25	21

=== 1940s ===
Players who made their debut for the Geelong Football Club in the 1940s
Order	Name	Seasons	Games	Goals
436	Bill Harwood	1940–1941, 1946–1948	69	16
437	Ron Sceney	1940	2	3
438	Len Toyne	1940–1941, 1945	35	15
439	Harry Heard	1941	5	2
440	Vic Nankervis	1941, 1944–1945	33	57
441	Lindsay White	1941, 1944–1950	117	429
442	Doug Jerram	1941, 1944–1947	24	18
443	Keith A. Miller	1941	5	0
444	Keith Palmer	1941	5	0
445	Ron Grove	1941	10	3
446	Max Nicolson	1941	8	0
447	Wally Southern	1941, 1944–1945	26	11
448	Bill Bartlett	1941	4	0
449	Dan Kearney	1941	3	0
450	Joe Bailey	1941, 1946–1949	31	2
451	Lionel Barclay	1944–1945	12	7
452	Harry Beasley	1944	3	0
453	Doug Brown	1944, 1946–1950	70	108
454	Jim Fitzgerald	1944–1950	108	14
455	Jim Howie	1944–1945	14	1
456	Bob McHenry	1944	10	1
457	Jim Munday	1944–1946	44	26
458	Ralph Patman	1944–1945	38	11
459	Jack Sing	1944–1946	33	1
460	Jack Tuohill	1944	4	0
461	Frank McWilliams	1944	6	0
462	Vic Taylor	1944	2	0
463	Gerard Barrett	1944	6	1
464	Tom Burns	1944	6	5
465	Jack Morgan	1944–1945	8	0
466	Max Atkin	1944–1945	5	0
467	Alec Mathieson	1944	7	1
468	Ian Brown	1944–1945	16	0
469	Vin Lidgerwood	1944	1	0
470	Les Powell	1944–1946	22	5
471	Phonse Marshall	1944	3	1
472	Jeff Brisbane	1944, 1947	4	2
473	Ray Bamford	1944	1	0
474	John Altmann	1944	3	0
475	Joe Finn	1945	8	1
476	Percy Hunt	1945–1950	112	35
477	Max Leslie	1945	14	4
478	Frank Hose	1945	14	0
479	Alwyn Lindsay	1945–1947	31	2
480	Andy Monahan	1945–1951	45	9
481	Kevin Brown	1945–1947	25	0
482	Neil Tompkins	1945	12	3
483	Ced Hovey	1945	10	0
484	Cec Hammer	1945	2	0
485	Alan Elliott	1945–1947	20	10
486	Jim Young	1945	2	2
487	Don Bauer	1945–1949	71	0
488	Keith Park	1945–1946	14	1
489	Jack Muller	1945–1946	21	25
490	Frank Pike	1945–1947	9	0
491	George Card	1946–1948	46	3
492	Fred Flanagan	1946–1955	163	182
493	Tom Morrow	1946–1952	120	58
494	Russell Renfrey	1946–1956	201	165
495	Bob Wynne	1946	3	5
496	Bill Icke	1946	14	1
497	Alan Rayson	1946–1947	18	15
498	Jim Brown	1946	5	0
499	Norm Scott	1946–1952	101	4
500	Jim Hovey	1946–1948	41	8
501	Mick McGlynn	1946	6	1
502	Jack Whitten	1946–1948	17	17
503	Bill Tomlinson	1946	7	4
504	Syd Tate	1947–1951	85	13
505	Len White	1947–1948	32	0
506	Ron Wood	1947–1948	16	2
507	Brian Fitzgerald	1947	5	0
508	Marty Lynch	1947–1951	43	63
509	Leo Turner	1947–1954	130	30
510	Arthur Irvine	1947–1949, 1951	48	40
511	George Pike	1947–1949	14	11
512	Brian Wilson	1947–1948	11	2
513	Alf Burrell	1947–1948	5	0
514	Bob Davis	1948–1958	189	149
515	Ron Lunn	1948–1950	39	6
516	Bruce Morrison	1948–1954	130	0
517	Bernie Smith	1948–1958	183	3
518	Max Trewin	1948	6	2
519	Jack McGrath	1948–1950	7	0
520	Doug Davies	1948–1950	12	14
521	John Hyde	1948–1954	108	12
522	Arthur Luke	1948	1	0
523	Bill Pritchard	1948–1951	21	0
524	Ian Toyne	1948–1950	38	0
525	Wally Russell	1948–1949	25	19
526	Warren Canning	1949, 1951	7	3
527	Jack Condon	1949–1950	31	47
528	Russell Middlemiss	1949, 1951–1955	74	2
529	Charlie King	1949	6	0
530	Barrie Bretland	1949–1950	15	2
531	Jim Tuckwell	1949–1952	22	0
532	Alan Hickinbotham	1949, 1951	6	0
533	Neil Trezise	1949–1959	185	272
534	Ron Warren	1949	5	0
535	Leo O'Halloran	1949–1952	20	19
536	Terry Fulton	1949–1954	51	3

=== 1950s ===
Players who made their debut for the Geelong Football Club in the 1950s
Order	Name	Seasons	Games	Goals
537	Ray Jones	1950	2	0
538	Andy Larkins	1950	4	4
539	Neale Rutzou	1950	2	0
540	Keith McKee	1950	6	0
541	George Goninon	1950–1954	78	278
542	Jim Norman	1950–1952	37	15
543	Jack Stevens	1950–1952	11	4
544	Noel Rayson	1950–1958	95	210
545	Bill McMaster	1951–1954	61	75
546	Les Reed	1951–1953	25	3
547	Loy Stewart	1951–1952	22	2
548	Ron Hovey	1951–1960	141	25
549	Don Scott	1951–1952	12	4
550	Peter Pianto	1951–1957	121	144
551	Bert Worner	1951–1955	65	10
552	Alan Reid	1951	2	0
553	Doug Palmer	1952–1954	57	11
554	Geoff Williams	1952–1959	121	1
555	Merv Richardson	1952	1	0
556	Norm Sharp	1952–1957	88	29
557	Tony Walsh	1952	3	4
558	Sid Smith, Jr.	1952–1953	23	0
559	George Swarbrick	1952–1953	23	8
560	Peter West	1952	2	0
561	Harry Herbert	1952–1957	56	27
562	Ivan Baumgartner	1953–1955	27	3
563	Bruce Murray	1953–1954	8	2
564	John McMahon	1953–1955	36	11
565	Les Borrack	1953–1960	95	15
566	Jim Roberts	1953–1956	21	3
567	Don Worland	1953	4	0
568	Ken Cameron	1954–1956	22	0
569	John O'Neill	1954–1962	136	20
570	Maurie Gear	1954	2	0
571	Howard Hawking	1954–1955	11	0
572	Don O'Hara	1954	3	0
573	Bob Wiltshire	1954–1957	30	12
574	Bob Gazzard	1954–1959	71	2
575	Glen Bow	1954–1956	14	3
576	Ken Beardsley	1955–1956	25	15
577	Matt Goggin	1955–1961	88	5
578	John O'Connell	1955–1960	81	65
579	Clive Brown	1955–1960	72	4
580	Max Sutcliffe	1955–1956	24	13
581	Bruce Ferrari	1955–1960	58	42
582	Colin Barton	1955, 1957–1959	38	0
583	Geoff Umbers	1955–1956	7	2
584	Roger Bullen	1955–1957	26	22
585	John Haygarth	1955–1959	59	13
586	George McGrath	1956, 1958–1962	71	0
587	Fred Wooller	1956–1964	132	225
588	Les May	1956	4	0
589	Bruce Bartle	1956–1959	34	26
590	John Goldsmith	1956–1964	6	0
591	Fred Le Deux	1956–1958	18	0
592	John Helmer	1956–1962	50	22
593	Eric Nicholls	1956–1963	58	0
594	Bernie Ryan	1956–1957	9	4
595	Ray Harrip	1957	4	0
596	Doug Long	1957–1961	73	52
597	Ian O'Halloran	1957	3	0
598	Bill James	1957	3	1
599	Bernie Crowe	1957	9	3
600	Martin Bourke	1957–1960	5	0
601	Alan Byron	1957–1958, 1960	25	3
602	Reg Fisher	1957	1	0
603	John Worland	1957	4	0
604	Colin Rice	1957–1963	97	87
605	Peter Barran	1957	5	0
606	Max Hetherington	1957–1958	11	4
607	John Laird	1957	3	0
608	Rod West	1957	3	0
609	Ron Smith	1957–1959	10	3
610	Frank Fitzpatrick	1958	9	1
611	Neville Martin	1958	18	4
612	Bruce Peake	1958–1961	25	9
613	Ross Sutherland	1958	2	0
614	John Thomas	1958–1960	35	8
615	Terry Mountain	1958	2	0
616	Peter Campbell	1958	6	4
617	Peter Falconer	1958, 1960	20	16
618	Bill Goggin	1958–1971	248	279
619	George Finegan	1958	4	0
620	Bill Cook	1958–1960	25	35
621	Graeme Gross	1958	2	0
622	Clif Palmer	1958–1959	5	1
623	Barry Cougle	1958–1959	14	7
624	Stan Harrison	1959–1960, 1962	15	4
625	John Yeates	1959–1965	86	76
626	Alistair Lord	1959–1966	122	79
627	Gavan Moran	1959	1	0
628	Fred Mundy	1959	4	0
629	Hugh Earnshaw	1959	2	0
630	Frank Pomeroy	1959–1962	32	29
631	Greg Major	1959–1961	28	1
632	Dale Mather	1959–1961	12	0
633	Paul Vinar	1959–1966	132	45
634	Ken Goodland	1959, 1961–1965	54	7
635	Ron Van T'Hag	1959	2	0
636	Alex Perry	1959	3	0
637	Hugh Routley	1959–1960, 1962–1964	27	0
638	Tony Boulton	1959	1	0
639	Ron Murray	1959	1	0
640	Brian Sharp	1959	1	0

=== 1960s ===
Players who made their debut for the Geelong Football Club in the 1960s
Order	Name	Seasons	Games	Goals
641	John Brown	1960–1964	48	4
642	John Devine	1960–1966	118	6
643	Stewart Lord	1960–1964	74	13
644	Denis Zanoni	1960–1962	14	0
645	Peter Walker	1960–1969, 1971	4	3
646	Bill Miller	1960–1963	37	19
647	Allan Cook	1960	10	24
648	John Fox	1960–1965	60	7
649	Terry Callan	1960–1964	62	5
650	David Hinchliffe	1960	3	0
651	Bruce Webb	1960	4	3
652	Barry Ward	1960	5	0
653	Garry Hamer	1961–1965	50	26
654	Doug Wade	1961–1972	208	834
655	Roy West	1961–1964, 1966–1967	108	1
656	Darryl Stephens	1961–1964	17	2
657	Bob Norman	1961	11	10
658	Tony Polinelli	1961, 1963–1971	138	63
659	Neil Sutherland	1961–1963	20	19
660	Terry Tate	1961	2	0
661	Brian Lowe	1961–1963	36	1
662	Graeme O'Donnell	1961–1962	7	4
663	Graham Farmer	1962–1967	101	65
664	Geoff Rosenow	1962–1970	147	7
665	Bill Hosking	1962	5	2
666	Brian Brushfield	1962–1965	15	3
667	John Sharrock	1963–1968	94	109
668	John Watts	1963–1965	52	4
669	Gordon Hynes	1963–1969	61	52
670	Colin Eales	1963–1967, 1969	56	24
671	Bill Ryan	1963–1972	167	220
672	Ian Williams	1963	2	0
673	Ian Scott	1963–1965	36	0
674	Wayne Closter	1964–1975	191	72
675	Kevin Kirkpatrick	1964	2	0
676	Sam Newman	1964–1980	300	110
677	Denis Marshall	1964–1968	84	25
678	Alan Teasdale	1964–1966	17	13
679	Ron Hosking	1964–1968	70	0
680	Gareth Andrews	1965–1970, 1972–1974	136	127
681	Alan Barr	1965–1967	22	11
682	Ricky Graham	1965–1969	35	4
683	Graham Hunter	1965	4	2
684	Terry Farman	1965–1973	133	9
685	Ken Newland	1965–1975, 1977–1978	198	243
686	David Brown	1965–1966	10	6
687	Gordon Reid	1965–1967, 1969–1972	56	0
688	Ken Gladman	1966–1970	49	9
689	Darryl Herrod	1966–1967	7	0
690	Brian Chirgwin	1966	3	8
691	John Davies	1966–1969	38	25
692	Geoff Ainsworth	1967–1974	135	3
693	Chris Mitchell	1967–1968, 1971	46	33
694	Rodger Marsden	1967–1968	3	0
695	Barry Primmer	1967–1969	37	4
696	Ian Nankervis	1967–1983	325	203
697	Hugh Strahan	1967–1972	88	41
698	John Brown	1967	5	1
699	John Noack	1967	1	0
700	John Scarlett	1967–1977	183	42
701	Phil Stevens	1968–1975	120	32
702	Ian Hampshire	1968–1975	113	22
703	Tony Gilmore	1968–1973	41	6
704	Phil Smith	1968–1970	12	17
705	Gerald O'Loughlin	1968	1	1
706	Ray O'Rourke	1969	2	0
707	David Harris	1969–1972	44	20
708	Pat Patterson	1969	8	0
709	Jeff Bates	1969–1971	6	1

=== 1970s ===
Players who made their debut for the Geelong Football Club in the 1970s
Order	Name	Seasons	Games	Goals
710	Kevin Higgins	1970, 1972–1978	128	35
711	Stewart Palfreyman	1970–1971	37	3
712	Jim Wright	1970–1972	20	5
713	Tim Colley	1970–1971	6	1
714	Jeff Kline	1970–1973	22	3
715	Phil Evans	1970–1971	27	8
716	Robert Adams	1970–1971	20	5
717	Bruce Nankervis	1970–1983	253	80
718	Peter Linke	1970–1971	10	0
719	Doug Stephenson	1970–1972	10	7
720	Shane McCarthy	1970–1971	3	0
721	David Clarke	1971–1974, 1976–1981	202	298
722	Peter N. Stephens	1971–1973	35	28
723	Peter Brown	1971	6	3
724	Rod Stokes	1971–1972	10	1
725	Michael Woolnough	1971–1978	117	42
726	Warwick Yates	1971–1973	21	0
727	Brian Martella	1971	1	0
728	Tim Evans	1971–1974	59	26
729	John Friend	1971	1	0
730	Rod Blake	1971–1983	176	113
731	Ray Haynes	1971	2	0
732	Graeme Linke	1971–1974	38	0
733	David Barkley	1972–1976	55	77
734	Terry Mayne	1972–1973	19	20
735	Greg Wells	1972–1973	4	1
736	Garry Davidson	1972–1974	30	16
737	Robert Whatman	1972–1974	34	17
738	Greg Lindquist	1972–1973	8	0
739	Ivan Russell	1972–1973	13	2
740	Paul Sarah	1972–1980	128	204
741	Chris Lynch	1972, 1974	5	2
742	Larry Donohue	1973–1980	105	339
743	Jack Hawkins	1973–1981	182	20
744	Harvey Davis	1973–1977	44	5
745	Michael Hawkins	1973	2	0
746	Ian Lewtas	1973–1976	15	4
747	Mark Browne	1974–1978	87	60
748	Ricky Browne	1974–1975	25	14
749	Leigh Crawford	1974–1975	31	6
750	Keith Miller	1974	2	0
751	John Preen	1974–1977	32	23
752	Peter Doyle	1974–1976, 1978	38	15
753	Barry Eddy	1974–1975	14	0
754	Rex Deeath	1974–1975	13	2
755	Kevin Sheehan	1974–1982	102	112
756	Michael Turner	1974–1984, 1986–1988	245	285
757	David Armour	1974–1976	19	14
758	Rex Hunt	1974–1975	32	44
759	Jeff Cassidy	1974–1980	50	20
760	Robert Neal	1974–1986	200	51
761	Doug Scale	1974–1975	11	0
762	Alan Woodman	1975–1979	58	2
763	Murray Gilmour	1975	7	0
764	Bryan Cousins	1975–1979	67	46
765	David Scott	1975	1	0
766	Phil Baker	1975	9	9
767	Bruce Thomson	1975	2	1
768	Graeme Landy	1975–1978, 1987–1988	54	31
769	Terry Bright	1976–1987	219	331
770	David Manson	1976–1978	38	13
771	Murray Witcombe	1976–1986	121	79
772	Colin Nish	1976–1977	10	0
773	Gary Malarkey	1977–1986	172	0
774	Andy McGillivray	1977	6	4
775	Peter Ruscuklic	1977	4	1
776	Ray Card	1977–1985, 1987	110	4
777	John Brimacombe	1977	3	0
778	Andy Preston	1977–1981	58	13
779	Jeff Fehring	1977–1979	19	1
780	Gerard FitzGerald	1977	3	4
781	Paul Jeffreys	1977–1985	91	23
782	Wayne Hovey	1977	6	10
783	Robert Steven	1977	1	0
784	Tom Floyd	1978, 1980–1982	47	38
785	Malcolm Reed	1978–1985	81	18
786	Russell Koehler	1978	1	1
787	Neville Bruns	1978–1992	223	174
788	Craig Dowsett	1978–1979, 1981	8	0
789	Kelvin Matthews	1978–1982	58	70
790	John Burns	1979	17	10
791	Glen Middlemiss	1979–1981	34	29
792	John Mossop	1979–1986	134	87
793	John Durnan	1979	1	0
794	Peter Johnston	1979–1986	92	108
795	Mark Bos	1979–1989	195	16
796	Peter Featherby	1979–1983	93	79
797	Mario Bortolotto	1979–1980	14	2
798	Greg Nichols	1979	1	0

=== 1980s ===
Players who made their debut for the Geelong Football Club in the 1980s
Order	Name	Seasons	Games	Goals
799	Maurice O'Keefe	1980	1	1
800	Zane Taylor	1980–1983	27	12
801	Stephen Lunn	1980–1982	48	37
802	Richard Murrie	1980–1982	35	3
803	Dale Smyth	1980, 1982	7	1
804	Mark Yeates	1980–1986, 1988–1990	154	57
805	Jan Smith	1980	2	0
806	Steve Reynoldson	1981–1986	84	70
807	Garry Sidebottom	1981	7	6
808	Ramsay Bogunovich	1981–1982	6	1
809	Alan Mangels	1981–1983	13	6
810	Phil Harrison	1981–1982	7	10
811	Bernard Toohey	1981–1985	94	35
812	Leo King	1981	4	8
813	Brian Peake	1981–1984	66	49
814	Darren Flanigan	1981–1991	130	50
815	Phil Maddock	1982	3	1
816	Andrew Bews	1982–1993	207	132
817	Peter Zychla	1982–1983, 1985	12	1
818	David O'Keeffe	1982–1986	50	22
819	Damian Drum	1982–1989	63	34
820	Stephen Nichols	1982–1983	7	6
821	Rod Waddell	1982–1984	20	10
822	Craig Cleave	1982, 1984–1988	48	12
823	Tim Darcy	1982–1983, 1986–1994	176	83
824	Karl Fedke	1982	2	0
825	Michael Kol	1983–1987, 1989	63	42
826	Denis Lenaghan	1983–1984	16	19
827	Nigel Kol	1983	2	0
828	Alan Reid	1983	7	0
829	Damien Christensen	1983–1986	17	8
830	Damian Bourke	1983–1989, 1991–1992	102	15
831	Ross Christensen	1983	2	3
832	Basil Flynn	1983–1984	6	1
833	Darren Troy	1983, 1987–1990	46	6
834	Gary Ablett, Sr.	1984–1996	242	1021
835	David Bolton	1984–1985	28	11
836	Robb Hawkins	1984	3	0
837	Mark Jackson	1984–1986	31	115
838	Greg Williams	1984–1985	34	10
839	Ray Byrne	1984	17	0
840	Garry Johns	1984	2	0
841	Darren Jackson	1984	2	1
842	Ray Sarcevic	1984–1985	4	0
843	Darren Morgan	1984–1990	92	69
844	Ron Watt	1984	22	13
845	Mick Lenaghan	1984–1986	22	13
846	David Simpson	1984	3	0
847	Steven Hocking	1984–1994	199	10
848	Marty Christensen	1985–1988, 1990–1991	69	18
849	Bruce Lindner	1985–1990	66	139
850	Kevin Ablett	1985	2	0
851	Paul Couch	1985–1997	259	203
852	Craig Alderdice	1985, 1987–1988	25	19
853	Shane Williams	1985–1987	21	7
854	Michael Schulze	1985–1991	91	12
855	Gerard Toohey	1985	1	0
856	Russell Mitchell	1985–1986	2	0
857	John Hoiles	1985–1986	7	0
858	Scott Morphett	1985	1	1
859	Billy Brownless	1985–1997	198	441
860	Craig Evans	1986	9	6
861	David Cameron	1986–1990	41	71
862	Barry Stoneham	1986–2000	241	223
863	Stephen Carey	1986	7	0
864	Peter Whyte	1986–1988	22	3
865	Scott Hosking	1986	1	0
866	John Fitzgerald	1986–1987	8	5
867	Robert Scott	1986–1994	132	164
868	Mark Bairstow	1987–1994	146	172
869	Dwayne Russell	1987–1991	50	51
870	Gavin Exell	1987–1991	53	111
871	Garry Hocking	1987–2001	274	243
872	Gary Cameron	1987–1990	26	18
873	Peter Baldwin	1987–1990	5	1
874	Sean Denham	1987–1991	44	21
875	Austin McCrabb	1987–1991	36	4
876	Darren Denneman	1988	4	0
877	Shane Hamilton	1988–1990	27	40
878	Tim Bourke	1989–1990	5	0
879	Ken Hinkley	1989–1995	121	58
880	Ray Sterrett	1989–1991	20	7
881	Andrew Rogers	1989–1992	75	2
882	Spiro Malakellis	1989–1993	67	18
883	Adrian Fletcher	1989–1991	23	10

=== 1990s ===
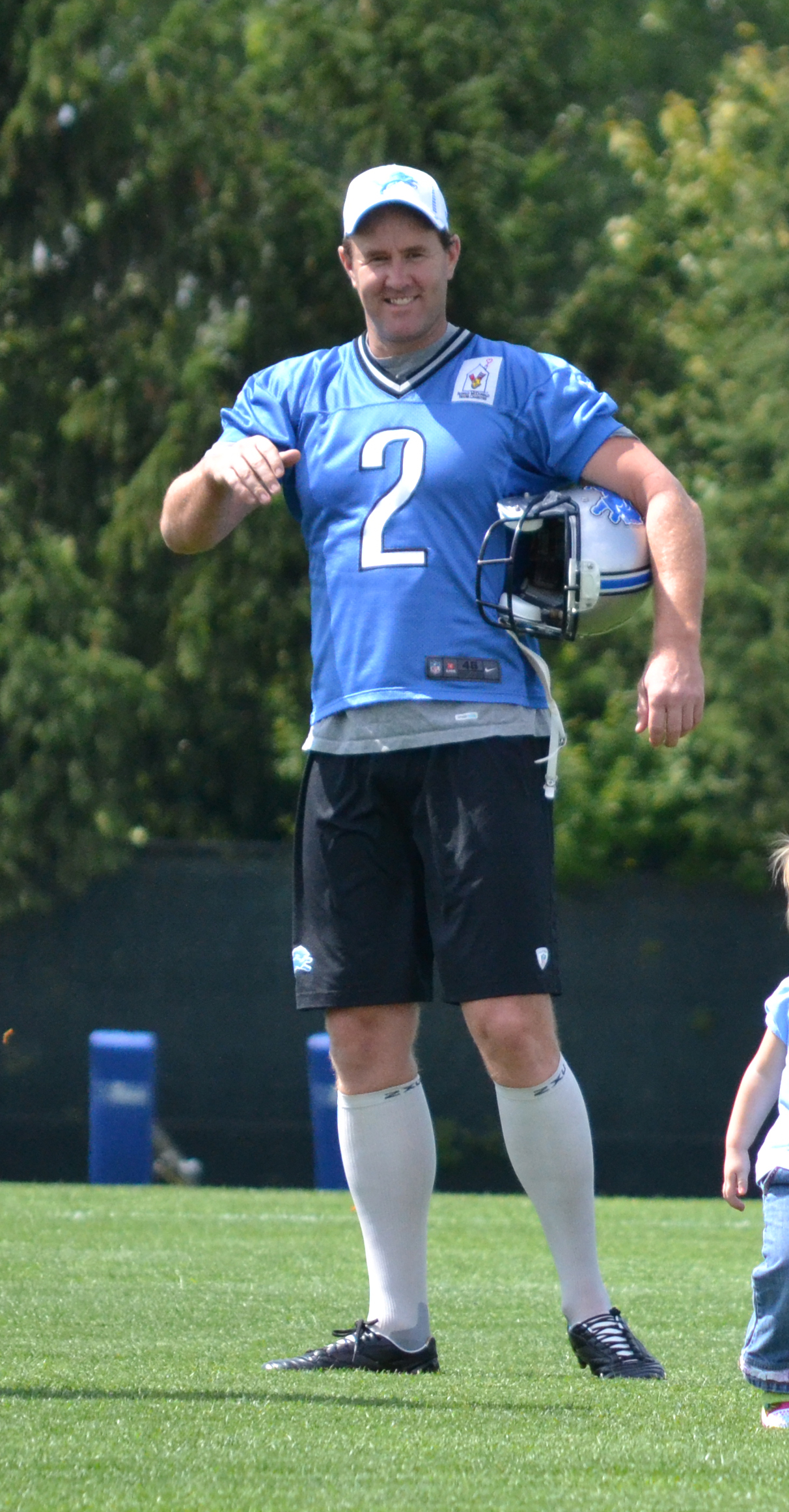
Ben Graham played 219 matches for Geelong from 1993 to 2004 and was club captain from 2000 to 2002 prior to becoming a professional American football punter in the National Football League in 2005.

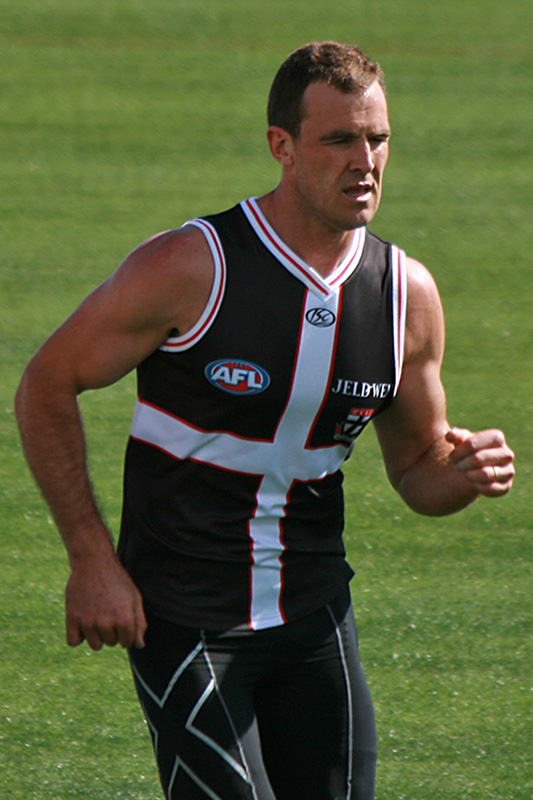
Premiership player Steven King played 193 matches for Geelong from 1996 to 2007 and was club captain from 2003 to 2006.

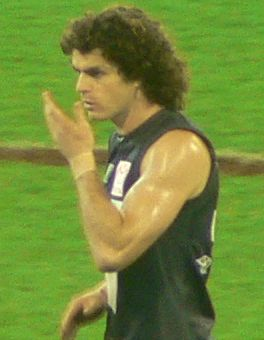
Triple premiership player Matthew Scarlett made his debut for Geelong in 1998.

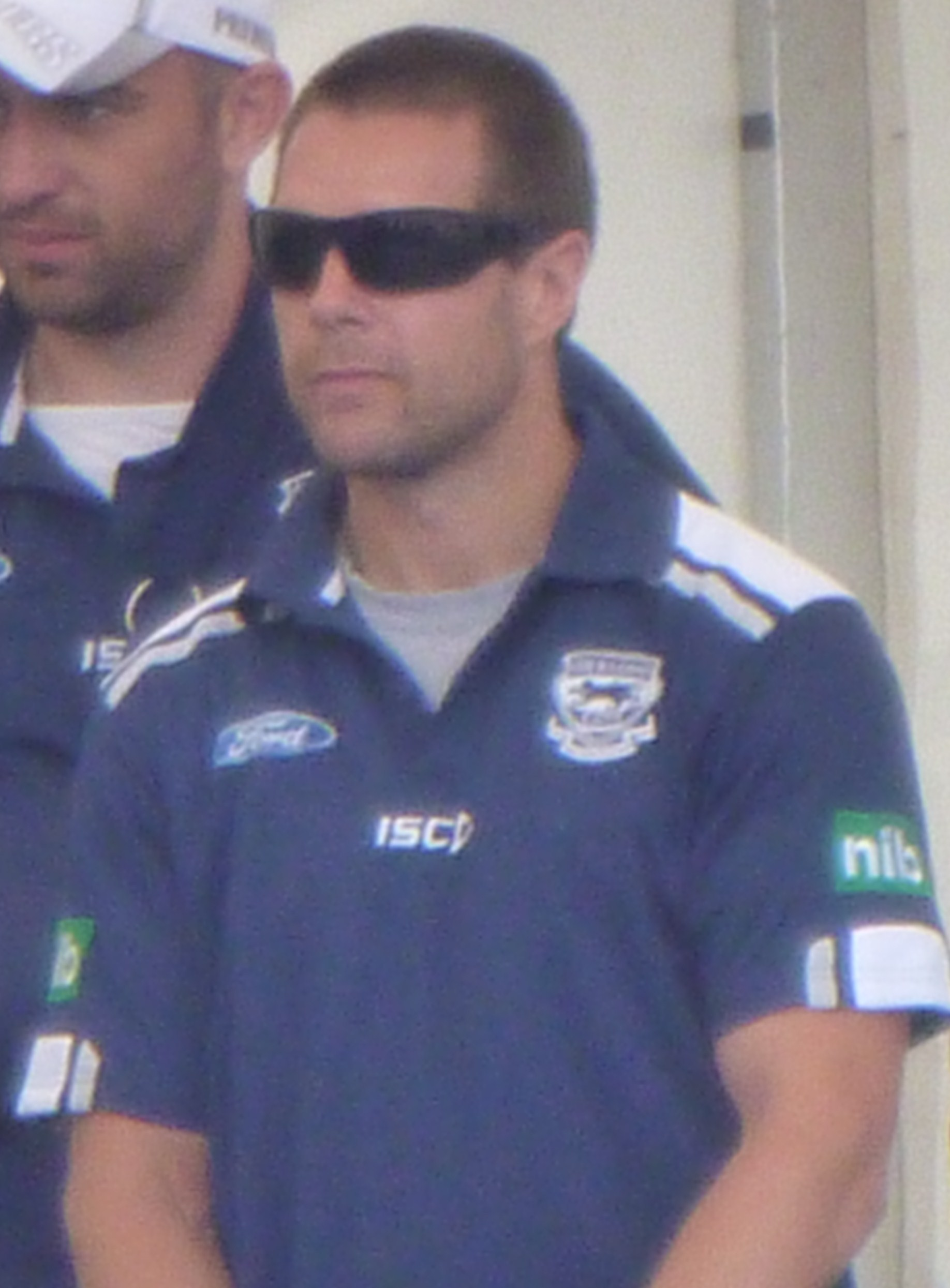
Triple premiership player David Wojcinski played 203 matches for Geelong from 1998 to 2012.

Players who made their debut for the Geelong Football Club in the 1990s
Order	Name	Seasons	Games	Goals
884	Bret Bailey	1990	1	0
885	Michael Gurrie	1990	7	2
886	Trevor Poole	1990–1993	54	34
887	David Welsby	1990	2	1
888	Brett Hungerford	1990	2	0
889	Tony Malakellis	1990–1991	14	12
890	Garry Phillips	1990	3	0
891	Paul Brown	1990–1998	84	66
892	Mark Neeld	1990–1993	48	17
893	Darren Forssman	1990–1994	45	35
894	Michael Mansfield	1990–1999	181	100
895	Stephen Hooper	1991–1993	21	0
896	Sean Simpson	1991–1998	114	18
897	Jamie Lamb	1991–1993	14	4
898	Andrew Wills	1991–1994	59	43
899	Russell Merriman	1991–1993	25	31
900	Trevor Spencer	1991	10	1
901	John Barnes	1992–1999	144	65
902	Steven Handley	1992–1996	73	28
903	Tim McGrath	1992–2002	219	18
904	Geoff Miles	1992	20	25
905	Anthony Darcy	1992	1	0
906	David Mensch	1992–2002	158	173
907	Peter Riccardi	1992–2006	288	286
908	Martin Heffernan	1992	3	1
909	Andrew Macnish	1992	3	7
910	Adrian Hickmott	1992–1995	50	24
911	Darren Steele	1992–1994	18	7
912	Leigh Willison	1993	3	4
913	Stephen O'Reilly	1993–1994	36	5
914	Liam Pickering	1993–1999	102	46
915	Paul Lynch	1993–2000	62	55
916	Leigh Tudor	1993–1996	60	53
917	Leigh Colbert	1993–1998	105	50
918	Ben Graham	1993–2004	219	145
919	Shayne Breuer	1994–1996	71	77
920	Cain Liddle	1994	4	0
921	Aaron Lord	1994–1996, 2002–2003	57	49
922	Grant Tanner	1994–1997	69	28
923	Daniel Fletcher	1994	1	0
924	Cristian O'Brien	1994–1995	2	0
925	Shane Crothers	1994–1995	4	0
926	Robert Di Rosa	1995	3	0
927	Brenton Sanderson	1995–2005	199	29
928	Brad Sholl	1995–2002	169	46
929	Derek Hall	1995–2000	74	74
930	John Cunningham	1995	2	0
931	James McLure	1995	3	0
932	Craig Biddiscombe	1995–1998	34	6
933	Tim Allen	1995	1	0
934	Ronnie Burns	1996–2002	134	239
935	Martin McKinnon	1996–1998	54	38
936	Jason Snell	1996–2001	68	62
937	Glenn Kilpatrick	1996–2002	120	31
938	Steven King	1996–2007	193	75
939	Clint Bizzell	1996–2001	75	72
940	Matthew Robbins	1996–1997	7	0
941	Carl Steinfort	1996–2000	65	19
942	Paul Corrigan	1997–2000	53	6
943	Darren Milburn	1997–2011	292	94
944	Tim Hargreaves	1997–1998	20	12
945	Adam Houlihan	1997–2001	61	75
946	Cameron Roberts	1997–1998	11	2
947	Daniel Lowther	1997–2001	34	9
948	Brett Spinks	1998	19	35
949	Tim Finocchiaro	1998–1999	10	1
950	Hamish Simpson	1998–2000	18	0
951	James Rahilly	1998–2005	90	11
952	Justin Wood	1998	7	5
953	Marc Woolnough	1998–2002	6	1
954	Leigh Brockman	1998	2	1
955	Joel McKay	1998–2000	4	0
956	Matthew Scarlett	1998–2012	284	17
957	Simon Arnott	1999–2000	26	20
958	Scott Bamford	1999	13	10
959	Tristan Lynch	1999–2000	17	7
960	Jason Mooney	1999–2001	32	50
961	David Wojcinski	1999–2012	203	66
962	David Clarke	1999–2003	89	48
963	Paul Lindsay	1999	2	0
964	Tom Harley	1999–2009	197	11

=== 2000s ===
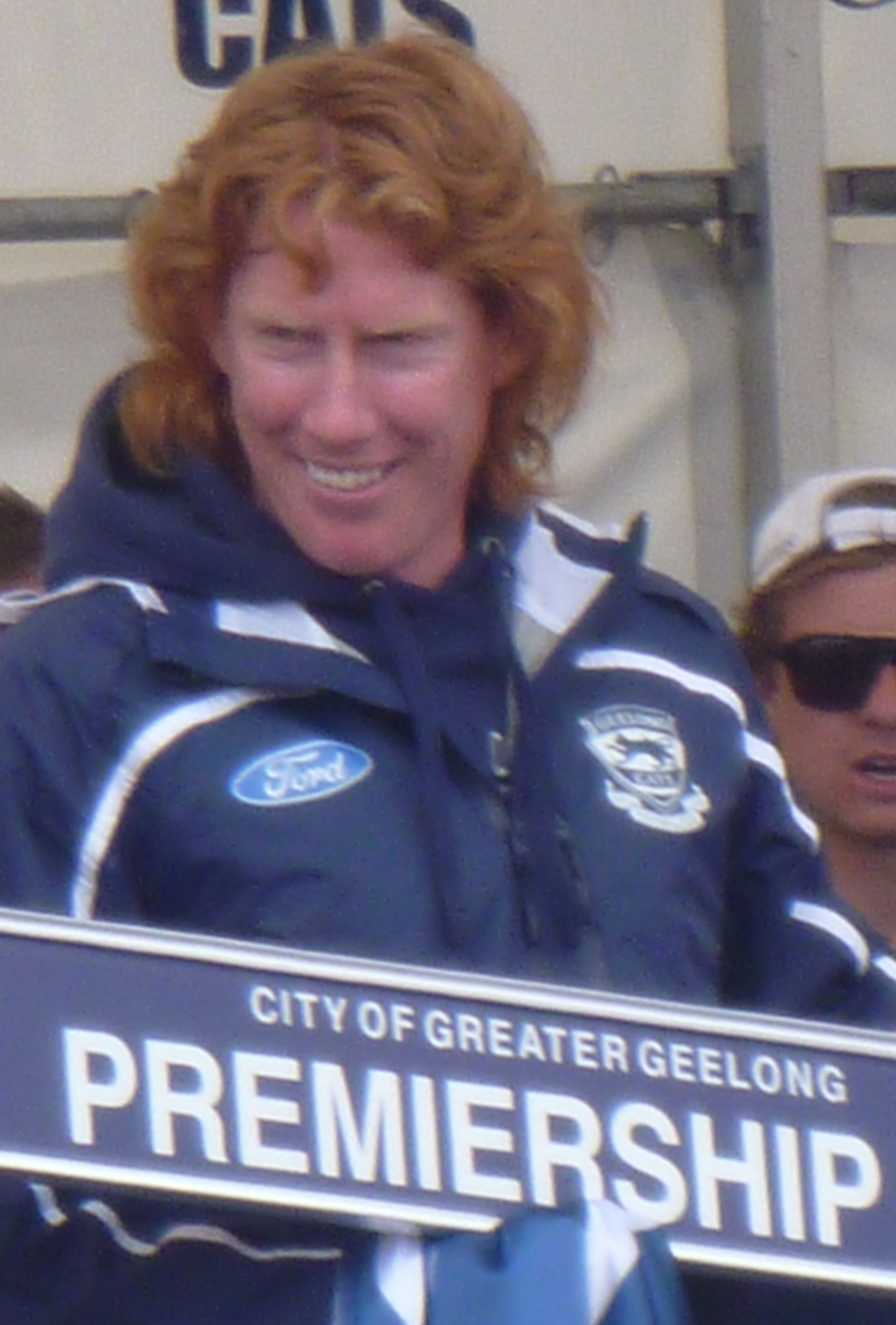
Cameron Ling played in three premierships in 246 games for Geelong from 2000 to 2011 and was premiership captain in 2011.

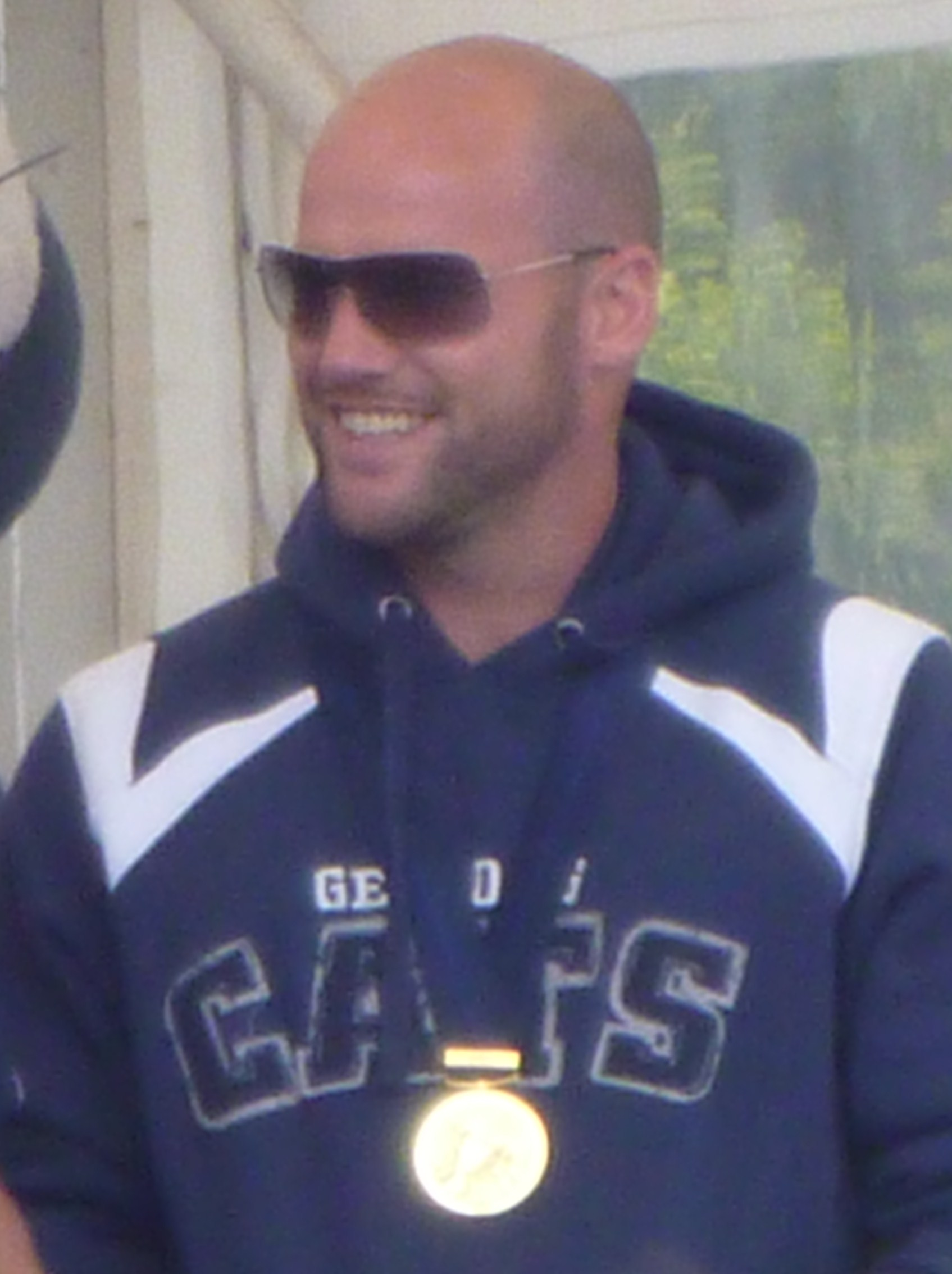
Triple premiership player and Norm Smith Medallist Paul Chapman played 251 games for Geelong between 2000 and 2013.

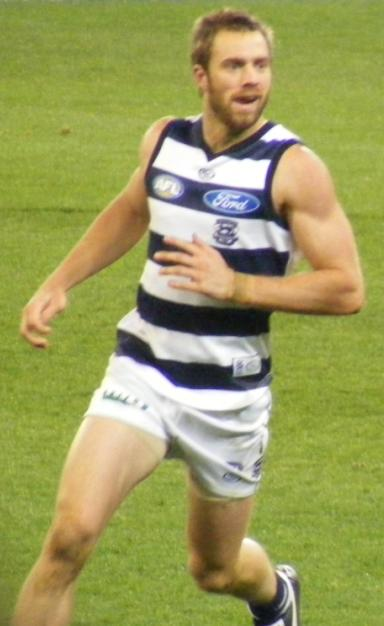
Triple premiership player Joel Corey made his debut for Geelong in 2000.

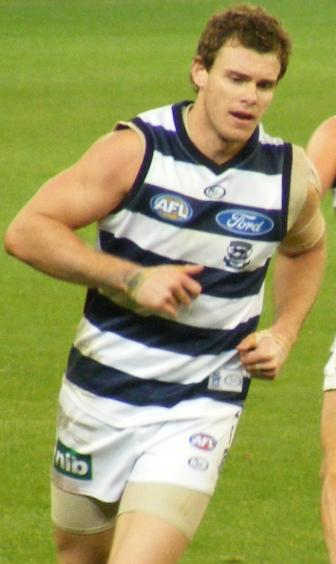
Dual club premiership player Cameron Mooney made his debut for Geelong in 2000.

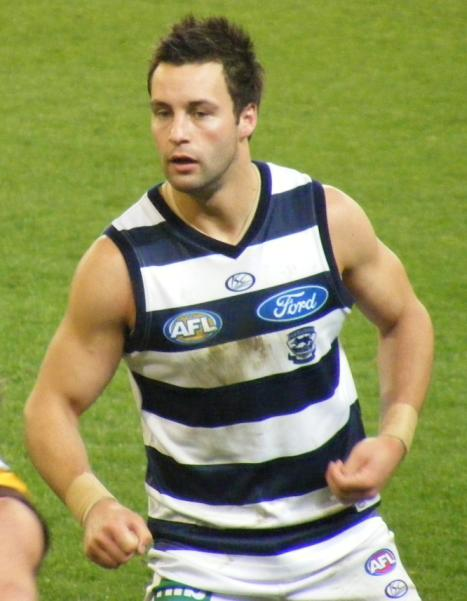
The 2007 Brownlow Medallist, triple premiership player and Norm Smith Medallist Jimmy Bartel made his debut for Geelong in 2002.

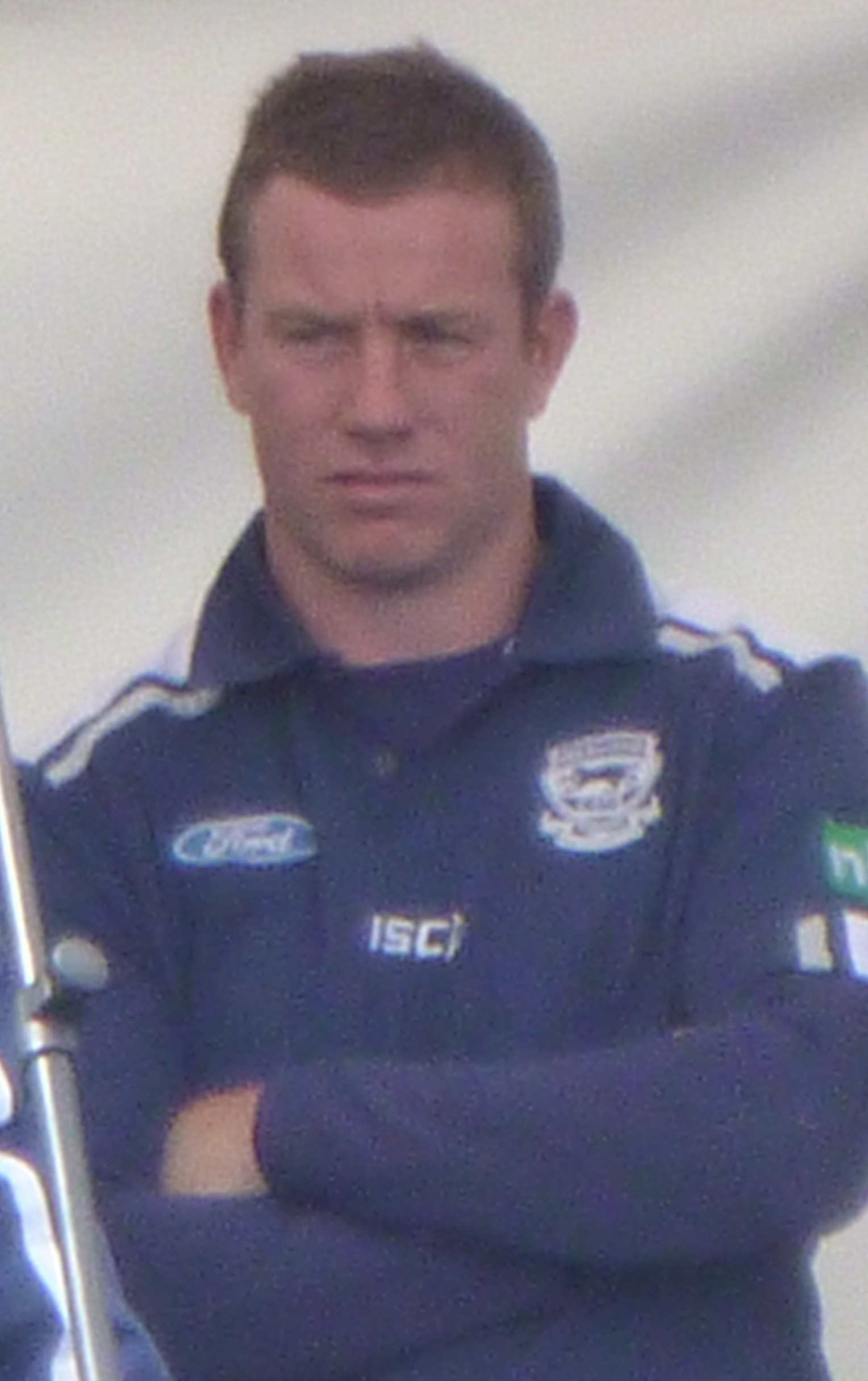
Triple premiership player and Norm Smith Medallist Steve Johnson has played 253 games for Geelong between 2002 and 2015.

Players who made their debut for the Geelong Football Club in the 2000s
Order	Name	Seasons	Games	Goals
965	David Spriggs	2000–2004	64	20
966	Danny O'Brien	2000	8	6
967	Daniel Foster	2000–2002	17	0
968	Cameron Ling	2000–2011	246	139
969	Paul Chapman	2000–2013	251	336
970	Joel Corey	2000–2013	276	79
971	Cameron Mooney	2000–2011	210	295
972	Marcus Baldwin	2000–2001	5	5
973	Justin Murphy	2001	18	9
974	Mitchell White	2001–2003	23	21
975	Corey Enright	2001–2016	332	66
976	Peter Street	2001–2003	17	3
977	Kent Kingsley	2001–2006	122	237
978	Josh Hunt	2001–2013	198	29
979	Gary Ablett Jr.	2002–2010, 2018–2020	247	321
980	Jimmy Bartel	2002–2016	305	202
981	Brent Grgic	2002–2003	13	3
982	David Johnson	2002–2009	79	16
983	Max Rooke	2002–2010	135	58
984	Paul Chambers	2002–2005	32	5
985	Steve Johnson	2002–2015	253	452
986	James Kelly	2002–2015	273	88
987	Charlie Gardiner	2002–2007	51	25
988	Will Slade	2002–2006	17	2
989	Matthew McCarthy	2003–2006	22	24
990	Brent Moloney	2003–2004	23	6
991	Henry Playfair	2003–2007	52	29
992	Tim Callan	2003–2006	15	3
993	David Haynes	2004–2005	19	15
994	Kane Tenace	2004–2009	59	12
995	Andrew Mackie	2004–2017	280	100
996	David Loats	2004	1	0
997	Shannon Byrnes	2004–2012	108	100
998	Paul Koulouriotis	2004–2006	18	4
999	Matthew Egan	2005–2007	59	1
1000	Brad Ottens	2005–2011	116	109
1001	Cameron Thurley	2005	7	12
1002	Tom Lonergan	2005–2017	209	55
1003	Mark Blake	2005–2010	99	12
1004	Nathan Ablett	2005–2007	32	46
1005	Brent Prismall	2006–2008	25	15
1006	Mathew Stokes	2006–2015	189	203
1007	Matthew Spencer	2006	2	0
1008	Ryan Gamble	2006–2010	24	31
1009	Joel Selwood	2007–2022	355	175
1010	Tom Hawkins	2007–2024	359	796
1011	Travis Varcoe	2007–2014	138	130
1012	Trent West	2008–2013	54	23
1013	Harry Taylor	2008–2020	280	75
1014	Shane Mumford	2008–2009	21	3
1015	Simon Hogan	2009–2011	22	10
1016	Nathan Djerrkura	2009–2010	4	0
1017	Tom Gillies	2009–2012	13	1
1018	Jeremy Laidler	2009–2010	2	0

=== 2010s ===
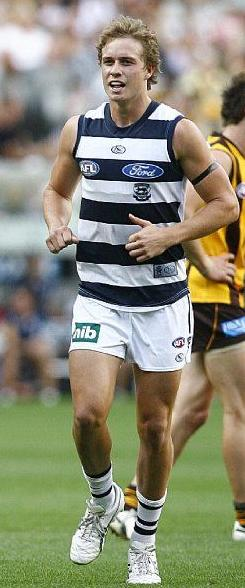
Premiership player Mitch Duncan made his debut for Geelong in the opening round of the 2010 season.

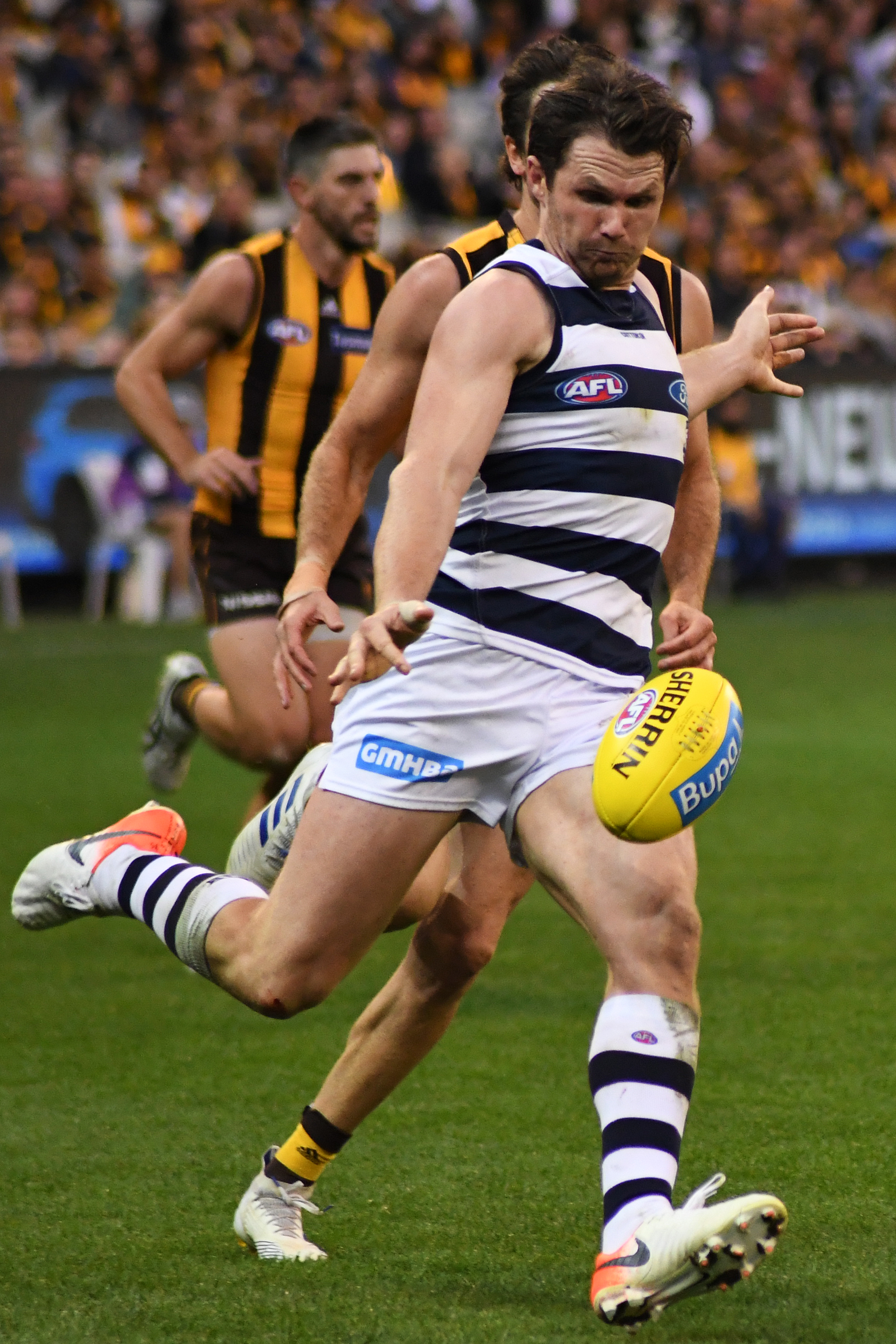
Club captain from the 2023 season, Patrick Dangerfield won the 2016 Brownlow Medal after transferring to Geelong from Adelaide.

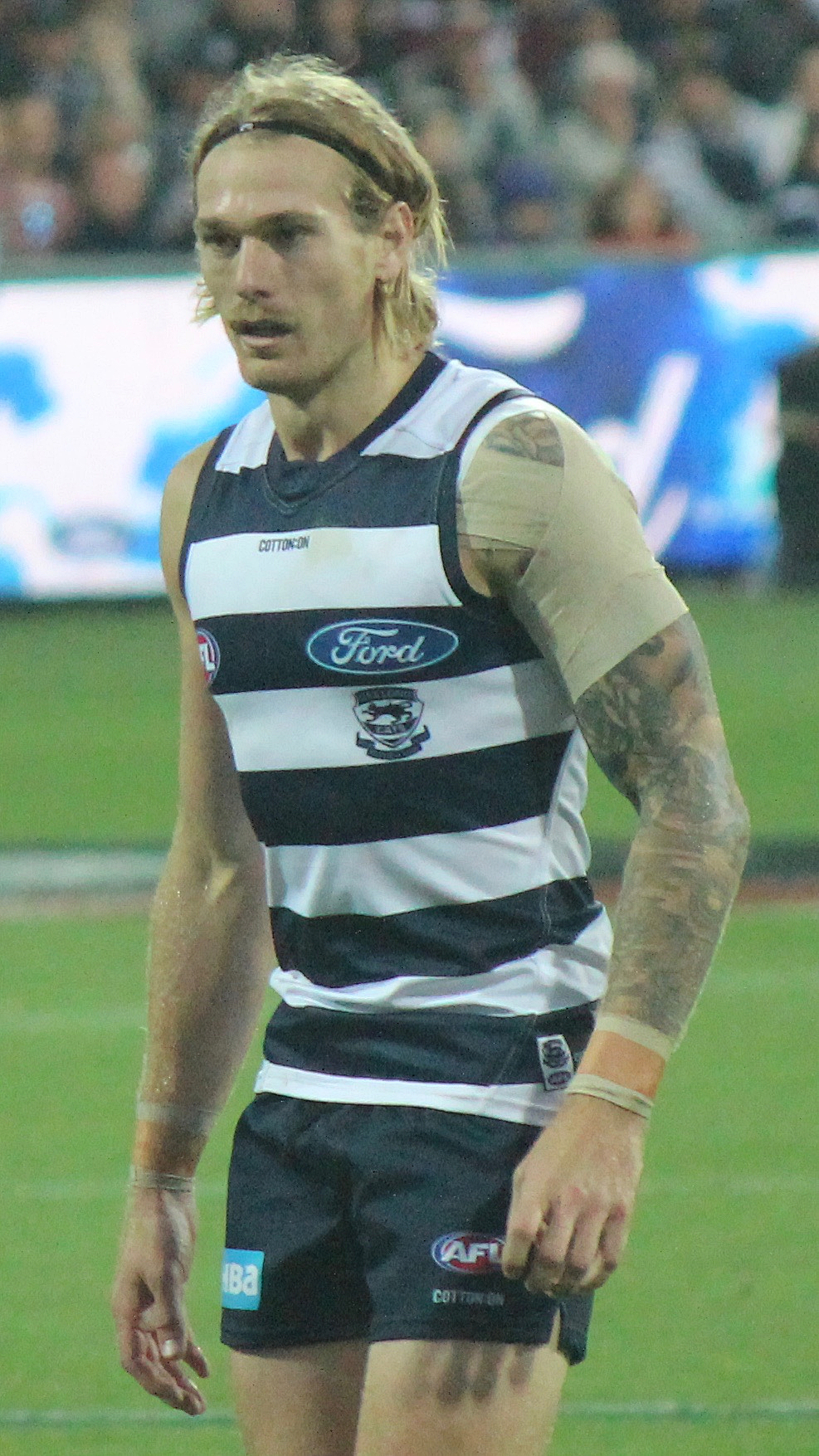
Two-time winner of the club's Carji Greeves Medal as best and fairest, Tom Stewart is a five-time All-Australian team member.

Players who made their debut for the Geelong Football Club in the 2010s
Order	Name	Seasons	Games	Goals
1019	Mitch Duncan	2010–2025	305	185
1020	Steven Motlop	2010–2017	135	175
1021	James Podsiadly	2010–2013	83	169
1022	Dawson Simpson	2010–2015	28	4
1023	Taylor Hunt	2010–2014	63	19
1024	Daniel Menzel	2010–2018	73	136
1025	Cameron Guthrie	2011–2024	240	75
1026	Allen Christensen	2011–2014	65	56
1027	Nathan Vardy	2011–2016	25	25
1028	Josh Cowan	2011–2017	16	5
1029	Mitch Brown	2011–2014	15	9
1030	Billie Smedts	2012–2016	38	19
1031	Orren Stephenson	2012	8	1
1032	George Horlin-Smith	2012–2018	51	27
1033	Jesse Stringer	2012–2014	19	8
1034	Jonathan Simpkin	2012	4	1
1035	Lincoln McCarthy	2012–2018	29	25
1036	Jordan Schroder	2012–2014	5	3
1037	Jordan Murdoch	2012–2018	108	73
1038	Jackson Sheringham	2012–2014	12	1
1039	Josh Walker	2012–2015	33	35
1040	Mark Blicavs^	2013–	315	85
1041	Josh Caddy	2013–2016	71	59
1042	Jared Rivers	2013–2015	44	0
1043	Jackson Thurlow	2013–2018	46	11
1044	George Burbury	2013–2014	7	3
1045	Hamish McIntosh	2014–2015	19	7
1046	Jed Bews	2014–2026	175	16
1047	Brad Hartman	2014–2015	5	1
1048	Darcy Lang	2014–2017	44	31
1049	Shane Kersten	2014–2016	37	41
1050	Mitch Clark	2015–2016	9	14
1051	Nakia Cockatoo	2015–2020	34	25
1052	Cory Gregson	2015–2018	39	20
1053	Rhys Stanley	2015–2026	172	75
1054	Sam Blease	2015	1	0
1055	Michael Luxford	2015–2016	2	0
1056	Jake Kolodjashnij	2015–2026	209	5
1057	Patrick Dangerfield^	2016–	225	232
1058	Lachie Henderson	2016–2021	89	13
1059	Zac Smith	2016–2019	50	20
1060	Tom Ruggles	2016–2017	22	0
1061	Sam Menegola	2016–2023	117	81
1062	Scott Selwood	2016–2019	34	7
1063	Brandan Parfitt	2017–2024	130	48
1064	Tom Stewart^	2017–	214	8
1065	Zach Tuohy	2017–2024	168	61
1066	James Parsons	2017–2020	35	26
1067	Aaron Black	2017–2018	7	5
1068	Mark O'Connor^	2017–	169	14
1069	Jordan Cunico	2017–2019	15	4
1070	Wylie Buzza	2017–2020	9	6
1071	Zach Guthrie^	2017–	153	16
1072	Sam Simpson	2017–2023	25	14
1073	Lachie Fogarty	2018–2020	23	6
1074	Tim Kelly	2018–2019	48	48
1075	Esava Ratugolea	2018–2023	75	38
1076	Jack Henry^	2018–	185	30
1077	Stewart Crameri	2018	4	5
1078	Jamaine Jones	2018	7	4
1079	Quinton Narkle	2018–2022	41	18
1080	Ryan Abbott	2018–2019	5	4
1081	Tom Atkins^	2019–	178	26
1082	Jordan Clark	2019–2021	32	15
1083	Charlie Constable	2019–2021	12	6
1084	Luke Dahlhaus	2019–2022	71	31
1085	Gryan Miers^	2019–	172	120
1086	Gary Rohan	2019–2024	98	120
1087	Darcy Fort	2019–2020	8	6

=== 2020s ===
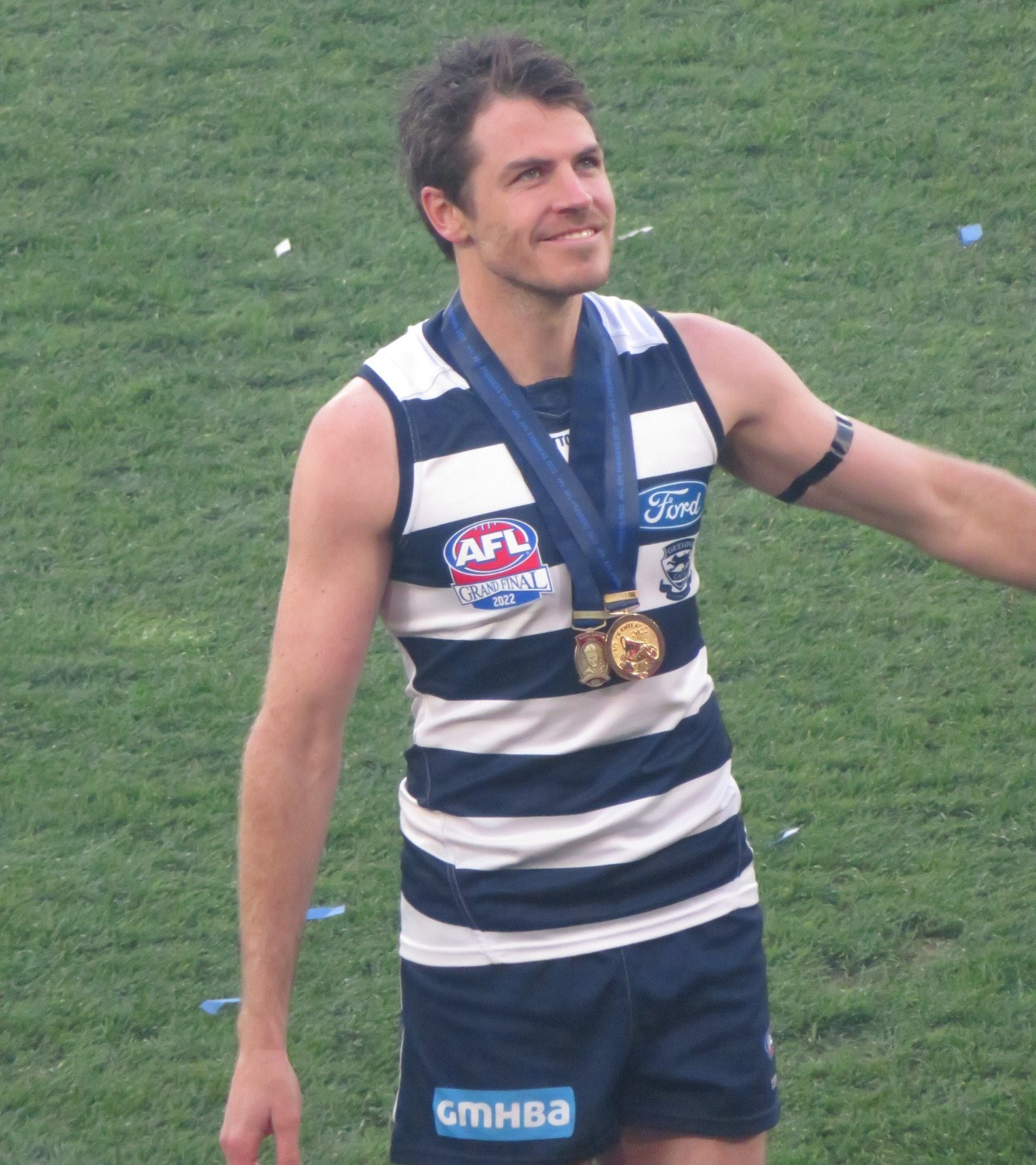
Isaac Smith won the Norm Smith Medal as best on field in the 2022 AFL Grand Final.

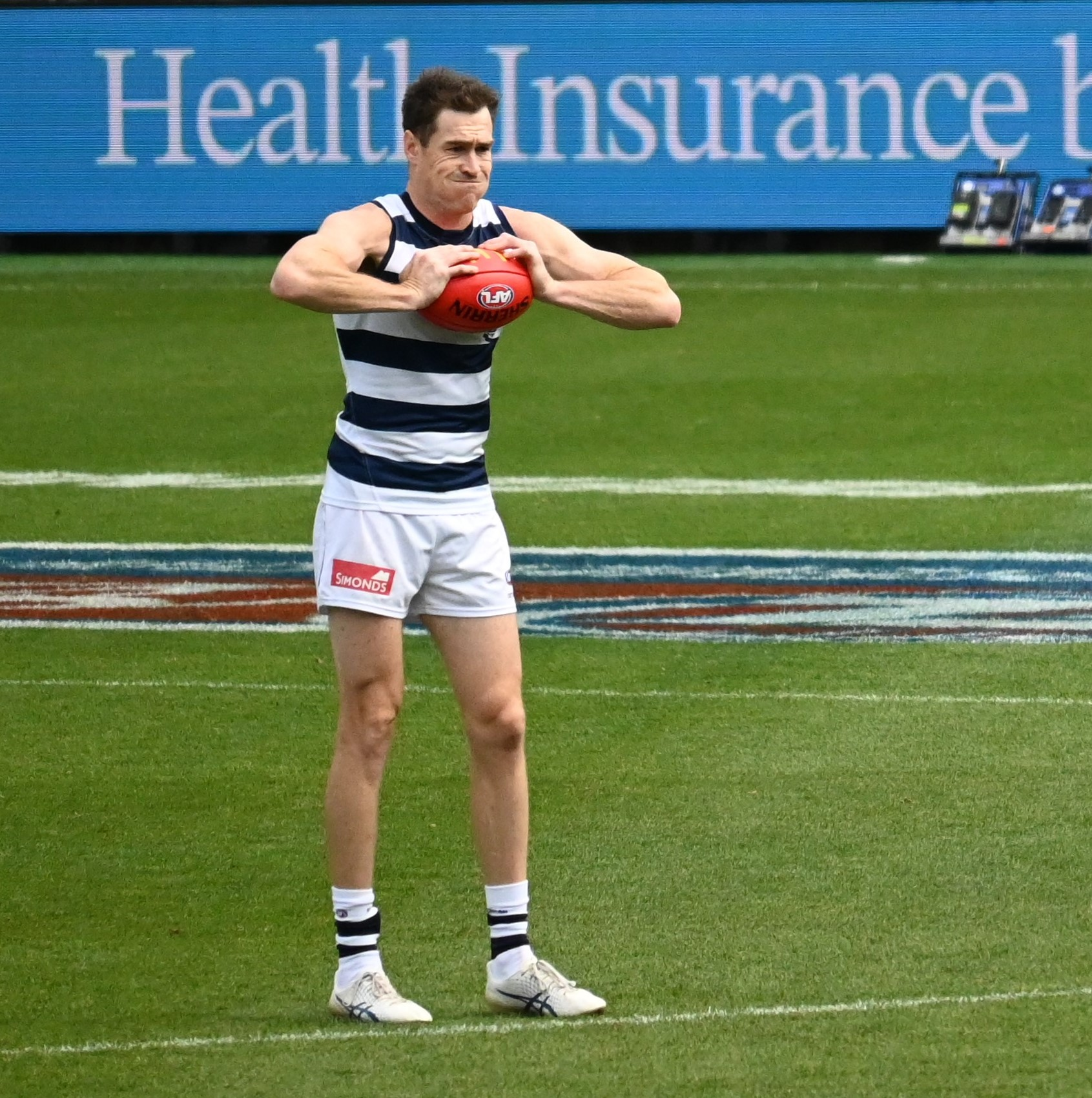
Jeremy Cameron was traded to Geelong from Greater Western Sydney before the 2021 season.

Players who made their debut for the Geelong Football Club in the 2020s
Order	Name	Seasons	Games	Goals
1088	Jack Steven	2020	9	1
1089	Brad Close^	2020–	145	119
1090	Josh Jenkins	2020–2021	2	0
1091	Ben Jarvis	2020	1	0
1092	Shaun Higgins	2021–2022	23	5
1093	Isaac Smith	2021–2023	70	40
1094	Francis Evans	2021–2022	7	3
1095	Max Holmes^	2021–	122	53
1096	Sam De Koning^	2021–	104	8
1097	Jeremy Cameron^	2021–	128	350
1098	Nathan Kreuger	2021	2	0
1099	Tyson Stengle	2022–2026 (Note: Did not play during the 2026 season)	93	160
1100	Oliver Dempsey^	2022–	83	89
1101	Mitch Knevitt	2022–2026	23	7
1102	Cooper Stephens	2022	7	1
1103	Shannon Neale^	2022–	70	120
1104	Jonathon Ceglar	2022–2023	9	0
1105	Tanner Bruhn^	2023–	59	14
1106	Oliver Henry^	2023–	84	140
1107	Jack Bowes^	2023–2026	69	39
1108	Cooper Whyte	2023	1	0
1109	Jhye Clark^	2023–	35	6
1110	Oisín Mullin^	2023–	68	5
1111	Toby Conway^	2023–	6	1
1112	Ted Clohesy	2023–2025	12	2
1113	Shaun Mannagh^	2024–	60	84
1114	Connor O'Sullivan^	2024–	51	1
1115	Lawson Humphries^	2024–	60	10
1116	Bailey Smith^	2025–	47	19
1117	Oliver Wiltshire^	2025–	18	15
1118	Jack Martin^	2025–	31	34
1119	George Stevens	2025–2026	4	2
1120	James Worpel^	2026–	11	4
1121	Mitchell Edwards^	2026–	20	3
1122	Jay Polkinghorne^	2026–	8	14

== Other players ==
=== Currently listed players ===
Currently listed players yet to debut for Geelong
Player	Date of birth	Acquired	Recruited from	Listed	
Player	Date of birth	Acquired	Recruited from	Rookie	Senior
Harley Barker	2 May 2007	No. 25, 2025 national draft	Sturt	—N/a	2026–
Cillian Burke	29 March 2003	Category B rookie selection	Kerry GAA	2025–	—N/a
Nick Driscoll	2 May 2007	No. 28, 2026 rookie draft	Northern Knights	2026–	—N/a
Lennox Hofmann	8 August 2006	No. 66, 2024 national draft	Sandringham Dragons	—N/a	2025–
Hunter Holmes	19 February 2007	No. 33, 2025 national draft	Oakleigh Chargers	—N/a	2026–
Jesse Mellor	1 April 2007	Category B rookie selection	Geelong Falcons	2026–	—N/a
Jacob Molier	11 October 2006	No. 52, 2024 national draft	Sturt	—N/a	2025–
Joe Pike	17 May 2005	No. 31, 2025 rookie draft	Geelong Falcons	2025–	—N/a

=== Delisted players ===
Delisted players who did not play a senior game for Geelong
Player	Date of birth (age when delisted)	Draft details	Rookie list	Senior list	Ref.
James Allan	Unknown	No. 21, 2004 rookie draft	2004	—N/a	
Tom Allwright	15 June 1990 (aged 20)	No. 46, 2009 rookie draft	2009–2010	—N/a	
Nick Batchelor	11 September 1986 (aged 20)	No. 29, 2005 rookie draft	2005–2006*	—N/a	
Zac Bates	30 April 1995 (aged 21)	No. 46, 2014 rookie draft	2014–2016	—N/a	
Ryan Bathie	15 April 1987 (aged 26)	No. 71, 2011 rookie draft	2011–2013	—N/a	
Liam Bedford (Note: Liam Bedford was drafted by the West Coast Eagles in the 2009 AFL rookie draft, and was on the club's rookie list for the 2009 season. However, Bedford was delisted at the end of the season without playing an AFL game for the club.)	12 July 1988 (aged 20)	No. 23, 2007 rookie draft	2007–2008	—N/a	
Nick Bourke	22 February 1995 (aged 19)	No. 31, 2014 rookie draft	2014	—N/a	
Ezra Bray (Note: Ezra Bray was drafted by Carlton in the 2002 AFL rookie draft, and was on the club's rookie list for the 2002 season. However, Bray was delisted at the end of the season without playing an AFL game for the club.)	14 May 1982	No. 17, 1999 national draft	2000–2001	—N/a	
Luke Buckland	Unknown	No. 5, 2004 rookie draft	2004–2005	—N/a	
Adam Chatfield (Note: Adam Chatfield played one game for Carlton in 2000.)	22 June 1979	No. 36, 2002 rookie draft	2002	—N/a	
Andrew Carrazzo (Note: Andrew Carrazzo was drafted by Carlton in the 2004 AFL rookie draft, and has played 178 games for the club since 2004.)	15 December 1983 (aged 19)	No. 5, 2002 rookie draft	2002–2003	—N/a	
Jock Cornell	2 April 1997 (aged 19)	No. 9, 2016 rookie draft	2016	—N/a	
Jason Davenport (Note: Jason Davenport was drafted by Port Adelaide in the 2008 AFL draft, and played 28 games for the club between 2009 and 2011 before being delisted at the end of the 2011 season.)	1 September 1985 (aged 23)	No. 38, 2007 rookie draft	2007	2008	
Cameron Delaney	19 June 1992 (aged 24)	No. 32, 2015 rookie draft	—N/a	2015–2016	
Adam Donohue	22 February 1990 (aged 19)	No. 60 (F/S), 2007 national draft	—N/a	2008–2009	
Marcus Drum (Note: Marcus Drum played 22 games for Fremantle between 2006 and 2009. Rather than being delisted, Drum retired due to ongoing injury problems in 2011.)	1 May 1987 (aged 24)	Traded from Fremantle in 2009	—N/a	2010–2011	
Cameron Eardley	24 June 1993 (aged 20)	No. 18, 2012 rookie draft	2012–2013	—N/a	
Ranga Ediriwickrama	10 August 1990 (aged 20)	No. 60, 2009 rookie draft	2009–2010	—N/a	
Ben Finnin	Unknown	Traded from Adelaide in 2002	—N/a	2003	
Phoenix Foster	12 September 2004 (aged 20)	No. 52, 2022 national draft	—N/a	2022–2024	
Joe Furphy	5 August 1999 (aged 25)	2023 Cat B rookie selection	2023–2024	—N/a	
Jarrod Garth	23 January 1986 (aged 19)	No. 13, 2005 rookie draft	2005	—N/a	
Ryan Gardner	1 June 1997	No. 59, 2015 national draft	—N/a	2016–2018	
Dean Gore	26 June 1996 (age 30)	No. 55, 2014 national draft	—N/a	2015	
Todd Grima	5 February 1987 (aged 20)	No. 12, 2006 rookie draft	2006–2007	—N/a	
Joel Hamling (Note: Joel Hamling has been recruited by the Western Bulldogs as a delisted free agent for the 2015 AFL season.)	9 April 1993 (aged 21)	No. 32, 2011 national draft	—N/a	2012–2014	
Mitch Hardie	5 September 1997 (aged 27)	No. 6, 2023 mid-season rookie draft	2023–2024	—N/a	
Matthew Hayball	12 March 1997	No. 70, 2015 national draft	2018	2016–17	
Timm House	26 May 1995	No. 68, 2016 national draft	—N/a	2017–2018	
Sam Hunt (Note: Sam Hunt played seven games for Essendon between 2002 and 2005.)	13 April 1983 (aged 24)	No. 41, 2006 rookie draft	2006	2007	
Jarrad Jansen	2 May 1995 (age 31)	No. 36, 2013 national draft	—N/a	2014–2015	
Xavier Ivisic	1 June 2006 (aged 19)	No. 12, 2025 rookie draft	2025	—N/a	
Emerson Jeka	18 September 2001 (aged 23)	No. 7, 2024 rookie draft	2023–2024	—N/a	
Ben Johnson	13 February 1987 (aged 24)	No. 37, 2010 rookie draft	2010–2011	—N/a	
Travis Jorgensen	Unknown	No. 24, 2003 rookie draft	2003	—N/a	
Chris Kangars	1 August 1989 (aged 19)	No. 46, 2008 rookie draft	2008	—N/a	
Jacob Kennerley	16 June 2000 (aged 20)	No. 50, 2018 national draft	—N/a	2019–2020	
Flynn Kroeger	23 July 2003 (aged 20)	No. 48, 2021 national draft	—N/a	2021–2023	
Padraig Lucey	2 July 1992 (aged 24)	No. 49, 2015 rookie draft	2015–2016	—N/a	
Keighton Matofai-Forbes	2 February 2006 (aged 20)	No. 69, 2024 national draft	2026	2025	
Dan McKenna	29 June 1989 (aged 20)	No. 50, 2007 national draft	—N/a	2008–2009	
Brodie Moles (Note: Brodie Moles was drafted by the Western Bulldogs in the 2010 AFL rookie draft, and played 17 games for the club in 2010 and 2011. He was subsequently delisted by the Western Bulldogs at the conclusion of the 2012 season.)	7 November 1985 (aged 23)	No. 16, 2008 rookie draft	2008–2009	—N/a	
Oscar Murdoch	24 September 2004 (aged 20)	No. 18, 2023 rookie draft	2022–2024	—N/a	
Stefan Okunbor	12 August 1998 (aged 23)	International selection (Ireland)	2019–2021	—N/a	
Stephen Owen	19 July 1987 (aged 20)	No. 35, 2005 national draft	—N/a	2006–2007	
Tom Read	18 July 1996 (aged 20)	No. 14, 2015 rookie draft	2015–2016	—N/a	
Patrick Retschko (Note: Subsequently traded to Richmond where he made his AFL debut during the 2026 AFL season)	28 February 2006 (aged 19)	No. 23, 2025 rookie draft	2025	—N/a	
Joel Reynolds (Note: Joel Reynolds played 38 games for Essendon between 2002 and 2006.)	5 June 1984 (aged 23)	No. 7, 2007 rookie draft	2007	—N/a	
Osca Riccardi	23 August 2004 (aged 19)	No. 32, 2023 rookie draft	2022–2023	—N/a	
Blake Schlensog	25 September 2000 (aged 20)	Next Generation Academy selection (Indigenous)	2019–2020	—N/a	
Tim Sheringham	26 August 1986 (aged 20)	No. 43, 2005 rookie draft	2005–2006	—N/a	
Scott Simpson	19 October 1989 (aged 19)	No. 44, 2007 national draft	—N/a	2008–2009	
Jeff Smith	Unknown	No. 8, 2003 rookie draft	2003–2004	—N/a	
Nick Stevens	23 March 2002 (aged 20)	No. 47, 2020 national draft	—N/a	2021–2022	
Cameron Taheny	3 August 2001 (aged 20)	No. 50, 2019 national draft	—N/a	2020–2021	
Jake Tarca	23 February 2000 (aged 20)	No. 68, 2018 national draft	—N/a	2019–2020	
James Toohey	27 March 1994 (aged 21)	No. 15, 2014 rookie draft	2014–2015	—N/a	
Paul Tsapatolis	20 June 2002 (aged 20)	Category B selection, 2021 rookie draft	2020–2022	—N/a	
Adam Varcoe	31 December 1990 (aged 19)	No. 15, 2009 rookie draft	2009–2010	—N/a	
Bryn Weadon	22 October 1989 (aged 19)	No. 31, 2009 rookie draft	2009	—N/a	
Jack Weston	3 April 1991 (aged 20)	No. 21, 2010 rookie draft	2010–2011	—N/a	
Zane Williams	5 June 2001 (aged 21)	No. 12, 2022 mid-season rookie draft	2022	—N/a	
James Willis	10 July 2003 (aged 21)	No. 32, 2021 national draft	—N/a	2021–2024	

- * Nominated rookie (Elevated to senior list during season, eligible for senior selection)

== See also ==
- List of Geelong Football Club captains
