= Merv Richardson =

Australian rules footballer

Personal information
- Full name: Mervyn Alfred Richardson
- Born: 17 May 1929; Geelong, Victoria
- Died: 31 August 1961 (aged 32); Newcomb, Victoria
- Original team: East Geelong
- Height: 184 cm (6 ft 0 in)
- Weight: 74 kg (163 lb)

Playing career^{1}
Years	Club	Games (Goals)
1952	Geelong	1 (0)
- ^{1} Playing statistics correct to the end of 1952.

Merv Richardson (17 May 1929 – 31 August 1961) was an Australian rules footballer who played with Geelong in the Victorian Football League (VFL).
