= Ron Murray (footballer) =

Australian rules footballer

Personal information
- Full name: Ron Murray
- Born: 31 January 1939
- Died: 28 January 2023 (aged 83)
- Original teams: Newtown and Chilwell
- Height: 193 cm (6 ft 4 in)
- Weight: 86 kg (190 lb)

Playing career^{1}
Years	Club	Games (Goals)
1959	Geelong	1 (0)
- ^{1} Playing statistics correct to the end of 1959.

Ron Murray (31 January 1939 – 28 January 2023) was an Australian rules footballer who played with Geelong in the Victorian Football League (VFL).
