= Andy Larkins =

Australian rules footballer

Personal information
- Full name: Andy Larkins
- Born: 30 October 1928 (age 98)
- Original team: Colac
- Height: 168 cm (5 ft 6 in)
- Weight: 68 kg (150 lb)

Playing career^{1}
Years	Club	Games (Goals)
1950	Geelong	4 (4)
- ^{1} Playing statistics correct to the end of 1950.

Andy Larkins (born 30 October 1928) is a former Australian rules footballer who played for the Geelong Football Club in the Victorian Football League (VFL).
