= Robert Steven =

Australian rules footballer

Personal information
- Full name: Robert Steven
- Born: 1 May 1957 (age 69)
- Original team: Barwon
- Height: 175 cm (5 ft 9 in)
- Weight: 74 kg (163 lb)

Playing career^{1}
| Years | Club | Games (Goals) |
| 1977 | Geelong | 1 (0) |
- ^{1} Playing statistics correct to the end of 1977.

Robert Steven (born 1 May 1957) is a former Australian rules footballer who played with Geelong in the Victorian Football League (VFL).
