= Max Sutcliffe =

Australian rules footballer

Personal information
- Full name: Max Sutcliffe
- Born: 30 July 1936
- Died: 3 November 2003 (aged 67)
- Original team: Ocean Grove
- Height: 185 cm (6 ft 1 in)
- Weight: 82 kg (181 lb)

Playing career^{1}
| Years | Club | Games (Goals) |
| 1955–56 | Geelong | 24 (13) |
- ^{1} Playing statistics correct to the end of 1956.

Max Sutcliffe (30 July 1936 – 3 November 2003) was an Australian rules footballer who played with Geelong in the Victorian Football League (VFL).
