= Arthur Mesley =

Australian rules footballer

Personal information
- Full name: Arthur Mesley
- Born: 7 August 1876; Omeo, Victoria
- Died: 9 January 1958 (aged 81); Heidelberg, Victoria
- Height: 169 cm (5 ft 7 in)
- Weight: 67 kg (148 lb)

Playing career^{1}
Years	Club	Games (Goals)
1903	Geelong	9 (0)
- ^{1} Playing statistics correct to the end of 1903.

Arthur Mesley (7 August 1876 – 9 January 1958) was an Australian rules footballer who played for the Geelong Football Club in the Victorian Football League (VFL).
