= Les Stephens =

Australian rules footballer

Personal information
- Full name: Les Stephens
- Born: 24 October 1898
- Died: 14 June 1958 (aged 59)
- Original team: Queenscliff

Playing career^{1}
Years	Club	Games (Goals)
1919–20	Geelong	7 (7)
- ^{1} Playing statistics correct to the end of 1920.

Les Stephens (24 October 1898 – 14 June 1958) was an Australian rules footballer who played with Geelong in the Victorian Football League (VFL).
