= Cyril Mulroyan =

Australian rules footballer

Personal information
- Full name: Cyril Patrick Mulroyan
- Born: 14 February 1907; Geelong, Victoria
- Died: 29 August 1945 (aged 38); Geelong, Victoria
- Height: 178 cm (5 ft 10 in)
- Weight: 75 kg (165 lb)

Playing career^{1}
Years	Club	Games (Goals)
1926–29	Geelong	11 (1)
- ^{1} Playing statistics correct to the end of 1929.

Cyril Patrick Mulroyan (14 February 1907 – 29 August 1945) was an Australian rules footballer who played with Geelong in the Victorian Football League (VFL).

== Employment ==
Mulroyan worked as a meat inspector.

== Death ==
He died, aged 38, when he was thrown from his skidding bicycle while riding to work in Geelong.
