= Michael Gurrie =

Australian rules footballer

Personal information
- Full name: Michael Gurrie
- Born: 16 April 1968 (age 58)
- Original team: Geelong West

Playing career^{1}
Years	Club	Games (Goals)
1990	Geelong	7 (2)
- ^{1} Playing statistics correct to the end of 1990.

Michael Gurrie (born 16 April 1968) is a former Australian rules footballer who played for Geelong in the Australian Football League (AFL) in 1990.
