= Arthur Hewitson =

Australian rules footballer

Personal information
- Full name: Arthur Osmond Hewitson
- Born: 27 February 1893; Sebastopol, Victoria
- Died: 4 November 1956 (aged 63); Parkville, Victoria
- Original team: Queenscliff

Playing career^{1}
Years	Club	Games (Goals)
1920	Geelong	4 (3)
- ^{1} Playing statistics correct to the end of 1920.

Arthur Osmond Hewitson (27 February 1893 – 4 November 1956) was an Australian rules footballer who played for the Geelong Football Club in the Victorian Football League (VFL).
