= Graeme Gross =

Australian rules footballer

Personal information
- Full name: Graeme Gross
- Born: 17 April 1938
- Original team: Newtown
- Height: 171 cm (5 ft 7 in)
- Weight: 64 kg (141 lb)

Playing career^{1}
Years	Club	Games (Goals)
1958	Geelong	2 (0)
- ^{1} Playing statistics correct to the end of 1958.

Graeme Gross (born 17 April 1938) is a former Australian rules footballer who played with Geelong in the Victorian Football League (VFL).
