= John Preen =

Australian rules footballer

Personal information
- Full name: John Preen
- Born: 15 March 1955 (age 71)
- Original team: Newcastle City

Playing career^{1}
Years	Club	Games (Goals)
1974 — 1977	Geelong	32 (23)
- ^{1} Playing statistics correct to the end of 1977.

John Preen (born 15 March 1955) is a former Australian rules footballer who played for Geelong in the Victorian Football League (now known as the Australian Football League).
