= Keith McKee =

Australian rules footballer (1928–2021)

Personal information
- Full name: Keith Howard McKee
- Born: 15 December 1928
- Died: 4 June 2021 (aged 92)
- Original teams: Geelong West, Traralgon
- Height: 178 cm (5 ft 10 in)
- Weight: 80 kg (176 lb)

Playing career^{1}
Years	Club	Games (Goals)
1950	Geelong	6 (0)
- ^{1} Playing statistics correct to the end of 1950.

Keith Howard McKee (15 December 1928 – 4 June 2021) was an Australian rules footballer who played with Geelong in the Victorian Football League (VFL).
