= Jeff Kline (footballer) =

Australian rules footballer

Personal information
- Full name: Jeffrey Kline
- Born: 13 May 1950 (age 76)
- Original team: Tasmania Juniors

Playing career^{1}
Years	Club	Games (Goals)
1970 — 1973	Geelong	22 (3)
- ^{1} Playing statistics correct to the end of 1973.

Jeffrey Kline (born 13 May 1950), more commonly known as Jeff Kline, is a former Australian rules footballer who played for Geelong in the Victorian Football League (now known as the Australian Football League).
