= Ewen Bumpstead =

Australian rules footballer, born 1910

Personal information
- Full name: Alexander Ewen Bumpstead
- Born: 3 March 1910; Geelong, Victoria
- Died: 22 October 1954 (aged 44); Geelong, Victoria
- Original team: Geelong College

Playing career^{1}
Years	Club	Games (Goals)
1929–30	Geelong	5 (4)
- ^{1} Playing statistics correct to the end of 1930.

Alexander Ewen Bumpstead (3 March 1910 – 22 October 1954) was an Australian rules footballer who played with Geelong in the Victorian Football League (VFL).
