= Cleve McDiarmid =

Australian rules footballer (born 1901)

Personal information
- Full name: Daniel Leslie Clevedon McDiarmid
- Born: 16 July 1901; Kalgoorlie, Western Australia
- Died: 13 July 1959 (aged 57); Newtown, Victoria
- Original team: Kalgoorlie Railways

Playing career^{1}
Years	Club	Games (Goals)
1927	Geelong	6 (4)
- ^{1} Playing statistics correct to the end of 1927.

Daniel Leslie Clevedon McDiarmid (16 July 1901 – 13 July 1959) was an Australian rules footballer who played for Geelong in the Victorian Football League (now known as the Australian Football League).
