= Clif Palmer =

Australian rules footballer

Personal information
- Full name: Clifton Palmer
- Born: 1 January 1937 (age 89)
- Original team: Mortlake
- Height: 183 cm (6 ft 0 in)
- Weight: 81 kg (179 lb)

Playing career^{1}
Years	Club	Games (Goals)
1958–59	Geelong	5 (1)
- ^{1} Playing statistics correct to the end of 1959.

Clifton Palmer (born 1 January 1937) is a former Australian rules footballer who played with Geelong in the Victorian Football League (VFL).
