= Jim Mellan =

Australian rules footballer

Personal information
- Full name: James Augustus Mellan
- Born: 10 November 1898; Geelong, Victoria
- Died: 25 September 1973 (aged 74); Footscray, Victoria

Playing career^{1}
Years	Club	Games (Goals)
1920	Geelong	8 (3)
- ^{1} Playing statistics correct to the end of 1920.

James Augustus Mellan (10 November 1898 – 25 September 1973) was an Australian rules footballer who played with Geelong in the Victorian Football League (VFL).

Mellan later served in the Australian Army during World War II, falsifying his age by five years in order to quality for service.
