= Ron Smith (Australian footballer, born 1937) =

Australian rules footballer (born 1937)

Personal information
- Full name: Ron Smith
- Born: 28 October 1937 (age 89)
- Original team: Winchelsea
- Height: 192 cm (6 ft 4 in)
- Weight: 86 kg (190 lb)

Playing career^{1}
Years	Club	Games (Goals)
1957–59	Geelong	10 (3)
- ^{1} Playing statistics correct to the end of 1959.

Ron Smith (born 28 October 1937) is a former Australian rules footballer who played with Geelong in the Victorian Football League (VFL).
