= Tom Brady (Australian footballer) =

Australian rules footballer (1892–1945)

Personal information
- Full name: Thomas Charles Brady
- Born: 1 May 1892; Geelong, Victoria
- Died: 17 July 1945 (aged 53); Geelong, Victoria
- Original team: Chilwell

Playing career^{1}
Years	Club	Games (Goals)
1917–19	Geelong	17 (14)
- ^{1} Playing statistics correct to the end of 1919.

Thomas Charles Brady (1 May 1892 – 17 July 1945) was an Australian rules footballer who played with Geelong in the Victorian Football League (VFL).
