= John Brimacombe (Australian footballer) =

Australian rules footballer

Personal information
- Full name: John Brimacombe
- Born: 12 July 1953 (age 73)
- Original team: Sandy Bay

Playing career^{1}
Years	Club	Games (Goals)
1977	Geelong	3 (0)
- ^{1} Playing statistics correct to the end of 1977.

John Brimacombe (born 12 July 1953) is a former Australian rules footballer who played for Geelong in the Victorian Football League (now known as the Australian Football League).
