= Roy Fleming =

Australian rules footballer, born 1901

Personal information
- Full name: Roy Leopold Fleming
- Born: 5 November 1901; Geelong, Victoria
- Died: 4 March 1964 (aged 62); Geelong, Victoria
- Original team: Chilwell
- Height: 168 cm (5 ft 6 in)
- Weight: 64 kg (141 lb)

Playing career^{1}
Years	Club	Games (Goals)
1923, 1926	Geelong	13 (10)
- ^{1} Playing statistics correct to the end of 1926.

Roy Leopold Fleming (5 November 1901 – 4 March 1964) was an Australian rules footballer who played with Geelong in the Victorian Football League (VFL).
