= Barry Primmer =

Australian rules footballer

Personal information
- Full name: Barry Primmer
- Born: 12 July 1946 (age 80)
- Height: 180 cm (5 ft 11 in)
- Weight: 80 kg (176 lb)

Playing career^{1}
Years	Club	Games (Goals)
1967–1969	Geelong	37 (4)
- ^{1} Playing statistics correct to the end of 1969.

Barry Primmer (born 12 July 1946) is a former Australian rules footballer who played for the Geelong Football Club in the Victorian Football League (VFL).
