= Doug Stephenson =

Australian rules footballer

Personal information
- Full name: Douglas Stephenson
- Nickname: Doug Stephenson
- Born: 5 August 1951 (age 75)
- Original team: Winchelsea

Playing career^{1}
Years	Club	Games (Goals)
1970 — 1972	Geelong	10 (7)
- ^{1} Playing statistics correct to the end of 1972.

Douglas Stephenson (born 5 August 1951) is a former Australian rules footballer who played for Geelong in the Victorian Football League (now known as the Australian Football League).
