= Gus McLennan =

Australian rules footballer

Personal information
- Full name: Angus Russell McLennan
- Born: 29 August 1897; Warracknabeal, Victoria
- Died: 16 April 1959 (aged 61); Melbourne, Victoria
- Original team: Geelong West / Geelong College

Playing career^{1}
Years	Club	Games (Goals)
1917	Geelong	1 (0)
- ^{1} Playing statistics correct to the end of 1917.

Angus Russell McLennan (29 August 1897 – 16 April 1959) was an Australian rules footballer who played with Geelong in the Victorian Football League (VFL).
