= Jim McNeilage =

Australian rules footballer

Personal information
- Full name: James Glen McNeilage
- Born: 17 February 1885; Port Melbourne, Victoria
- Died: 23 August 1952 (aged 67); Williamstown, Victoria
- Original team: Williamstown

Playing career^{1}
Years	Club	Games (Goals)
1907	Geelong	7 (2)
- ^{1} Playing statistics correct to the end of 1907.

James Glen McNeilage (17 February 1885 – 23 August 1952) was an Australian rules footballer who played with Geelong in the Victorian Football League (VFL).
