= Christy Gorman =

Australian rules footballer

Personal information
- Full name: Christopher John Gorman
- Born: 19 December 1889; Geelong, Victoria
- Died: 29 January 1955 (aged 65); Geelong, Victoria

Playing career^{1}
| Years | Club | Games (Goals) |
| 1910 | Geelong | 1 (2) |
- ^{1} Playing statistics correct to the end of 1910.

Christopher John Gorman (19 December 1889 – 29 January 1955) was an Australian rules footballer who played with Geelong in the Victorian Football League (VFL).
