= Reg Sutterby =

Australian rules footballer

Personal information
- Full name: Herbert Reginald Sutterby
- Born: 25 April 1899; Moolap, Victoria
- Died: 17 September 1955 (aged 56); Heidelberg, Victoria

Playing career^{1}
Years	Club	Games (Goals)
1919	Geelong	9 (1)
- ^{1} Playing statistics correct to the end of 1919.

Herbert Reginald Sutterby (25 April 1899 – 17 September 1955) was an Australian rules footballer who played with Geelong in the Victorian Football League (VFL).
