= Artie Hopkins =

Australian rules footballer

Personal information
- Full name: Arthur Henry Stanbridge Hopkins
- Born: 21 August 1879; Geelong, Victoria
- Died: 19 October 1961 (aged 82); Newtown, Victoria

Playing career^{1}
Years	Club	Games (Goals)
1903, 1905	Geelong	5 (0)
- ^{1} Playing statistics correct to the end of 1905.

Arthur Henry Stanbridge Hopkins (21 August 1879 – 19 October 1961) was an Australian rules footballer who played for the Geelong Football Club in the Victorian Football League (VFL).
