= Dave Beard (footballer) =

Australian rules footballer

Personal information
- Full name: David Benjamin Beard
- Born: 15 September 1885; Geelong, Victoria
- Died: 17 August 1965 (aged 79); Geelong, Victoria
- Original team: East Geelong

Playing career^{1}
Years	Club	Games (Goals)
1906, 1908–11	Geelong	38 (12)
- ^{1} Playing statistics correct to the end of 1911.

David Benjamin Beard (15 September 1885 – 17 August 1965) was an Australian rules footballer who played with Geelong in the Victorian Football League (VFL).
