= Frank Hodgins =

Australian rules footballer

Personal information
- Full name: Francis Hodgins
- Born: 5 April 1888; Geelong, Victoria
- Died: 11 March 1966 (aged 77); Geelong West, Victoria

Playing career^{1}
Years	Club	Games (Goals)
1915, 1917–18	Geelong	12 (2)
- ^{1} Playing statistics correct to the end of 1918.

Frank Hodgins (5 April 1888 – 11 March 1966) was an Australian rules footballer who played with Geelong in the Victorian Football League (VFL).
