= Ralph Upton =

Australian rules footballer

Personal information
- Full name: Ralph Eldridge Roebuck Upton
- Born: 8 June 1885; Adelaide, South Australia
- Died: 1 May 1981 (aged 95); Castle Hill, New South Wales
- Height: 171 cm (5 ft 7 in)
- Weight: 71 kg (157 lb)

Playing career^{1}
Years	Club	Games (Goals)
1907	Geelong	1 (0)
- ^{1} Playing statistics correct to the end of 1907.

Ralph Eldridge Roebuck Upton MC (8 June 1885 – 1 May 1981) was an Australian rules footballer who played with Geelong in the Victorian Football League (VFL).

Upton made his only senior football appearance for Geelong in a game against South Melbourne in 1907, while he was completing his law degree at the University of Melbourne. He was admitted to practice law on 10 March 1909.

After being rejected for service by the Australian Army, he travelled to England and joined the Inns of Court detachment before being transferred to the 8th Hampshire Regiment. Ralph Upton received a Military Cross for "conspicuous gallantry and devotion to duty in leading his platoon, and more especially in collecting men of other units and leading them into heavy fire to fill a gap in the line. Throughout the day he continued, by his courage, to set a magnificent example to all troops, until he fell severely wounded".

After the war Upton returned to Australia and married Vera Loris Berteau in 1924. He was also admitted to practice in New South Wales in 1924 and practised in several rural New South Wales localities. He died in 1981.
