= Murray Gilmour =

Australian rules footballer

Personal information
- Full name: Murray John Gilmour
- Born: 28 November 1950 (age 75)
- Original team: Donald

Playing career^{1}
| Years | Club | Games (Goals) |
| 1975 | Geelong | 7 (0) |
- ^{1} Playing statistics correct to the end of 1975.

Murray John Gilmour (born 28 November 1950) is a former Australian rules footballer who played for Geelong in the Victorian Football League (now known as the Australian Football League).
