= Rodger Marsden =

Australian rules footballer

Personal information
- Full name: Rodger Marsden
- Born: 17 August 1944
- Height: 184 cm (6 ft 0 in)
- Weight: 86 kg (190 lb)

Playing career^{1}
Years	Club	Games (Goals)
1967–68	Geelong	3 (0)
- ^{1} Playing statistics correct to the end of 1968.

Rodger Marsden (born 17 August 1944) is a former Australian rules footballer who played with Geelong in the Victorian Football League (VFL).
