= Bert Schofield =

Australian rules footballer

Personal information
- Full name: Albert Schofield
- Born: 1 September 1890; Geelong, Victoria
- Died: 12 August 1969 (aged 78); Geelong, Victoria

Playing career^{1}
Years	Club	Games (Goals)
1911–1913	Geelong	11 (6)
- ^{1} Playing statistics correct to the end of 1913.

Albert Schofield MBE (1 September 1890 – 12 August 1969) was an Australian rules footballer who played for the Geelong Football Club in the Victorian Football League (VFL).

In 1959 he was appointed as a Member of the Order of the British Empire (MBE) by Elizabeth II for his service as manager of the Returned Soldier's Woollen Mills.

He is the great-great-grandfather of former west coast eagles premiership player Will Schofield
