= Jack Tuohill =

Australian rules footballer, born 1919

Personal information
- Full name: Jack Tuohill
- Born: 13 March 1919
- Died: 30 May 1968 (aged 49)
- Original team: Geelong Amateurs
- Height: 178 cm (5 ft 10 in)
- Weight: 72 kg (159 lb)

Playing career^{1}
Years	Club	Games (Goals)
1944	Geelong	4 (0)
- ^{1} Playing statistics correct to the end of 1944.

Jack Tuohill (13 March 1919 – 30 May 1968) was an Australian rules footballer who played with Geelong in the Victorian Football League (VFL).
