= Greg Lindquist (footballer) =

Australian rules footballer

Personal information
- Full name: Gregory Lindquist
- Nickname: Greg Lindquist
- Born: 31 January 1954 (age 72)
- Original team: Geelong College

Playing career^{1}
Years	Club	Games (Goals)
1972 — 1973	Geelong	8 (0)
- ^{1} Playing statistics correct to the end of 1973.

Gregory Lindquist (born 31 January 1954), more commonly known as Greg Lindquist, is a former Australian rules footballer who played for Geelong in the Victorian Football League (now known as the Australian Football League).
