= Joe Roach =

Australian rules footballer, born 1903

Personal information
- Full name: Joe Roach
- Born: 16 April 1903
- Died: 24 January 1967 (aged 63)

Playing career^{1}
Years	Club	Games (Goals)
1928	Geelong	1 (0)
- ^{1} Playing statistics correct to the end of 1928.

Joe Roach (16 April 1903 – 24 January 1967) was an Australian rules footballer who played with Geelong in the Victorian Football League (VFL).
