= Les Gell =

Australian rules footballer

Personal information
- Full name: Herbert Leslie Gell
- Born: 12 August 1886; Geelong, Victoria
- Died: 12 May 1938 (aged 51); Geelong, Victoria

Playing career^{1}
Years	Club	Games (Goals)
1908	Geelong	6 (5)
- ^{1} Playing statistics correct to the end of 1908.

Herbert Leslie Gell (12 August 1886 – 12 May 1938) was an Australian rules footballer who played with Geelong in the Victorian Football League (VFL).
