= Norm MacKay =

Australian rules footballer

Personal information
- Full name: Norman David MacKay
- Born: 15 November 1890; Geelong, Victoria
- Died: 15 June 1965 (aged 74); Brighton, Victoria
- Original team: Chilwell

Playing career^{1}
Years	Club	Games (Goals)
1917–18	Geelong	21 (5)
- ^{1} Playing statistics correct to the end of 1918.

Norman David MacKay (15 November 1890 – 15 June 1965) was an Australian rules footballer who played with Geelong in the Victorian Football League (VFL).
