= Don Hickey =

Australian rules footballer, born 1902

Personal information
- Full name: Don Hickey
- Born: 12 July 1902
- Died: 25 January 1976 (aged 73)
- Height: 170 cm (5 ft 7 in)
- Weight: 73 kg (161 lb)

Playing career^{1}
| Years | Club | Games (Goals) |
| 1926 | Geelong | 2 (0) |
- ^{1} Playing statistics correct to the end of 1926.

Don Hickey (12 July 1902 – 25 January 1976) was an Australian rules footballer who played with Geelong in the Victorian Football League (VFL).
