= Alf Dupe =

Australian rules footballer

Personal information
- Full name: Alfred Dupe
- Born: 1 January 1876; Geelong, Victoria
- Died: 14 April 1950 (aged 74); Mooroopna, Victoria

Playing career^{1}
Years	Club	Games (Goals)
1906–1907	Geelong	8 (5)
- ^{1} Playing statistics correct to the end of 1907.

Alf Dupe (1 January 1876 – 14 April 1950) was an Australian rules footballer who played for the Geelong Football Club in the Victorian Football League (VFL).
