= Greg Major =

Australian rules footballer (born 1938)

Personal information
- Full name: Greg Major
- Born: 3 June 1938
- Original team: Cohuna Union
- Height: 188 cm (6 ft 2 in)
- Weight: 86 kg (190 lb)

Playing career^{1}
Years	Club	Games (Goals)
1959–61	Geelong	28 (1)
- ^{1} Playing statistics correct to the end of 1961.

Greg Major (born 3 June 1938) is a former Australian rules footballer who played with Geelong in the Victorian Football League (VFL).
