= Bill Getsom =

Australian rules footballer

Personal information
- Full name: William Alfred Getsom
- Born: 11 January 1885; Geelong, Victoria
- Died: 6 August 1954 (aged 69); Geelong, Victoria
- Original team: Ashby

Playing career^{1}
Years	Club	Games (Goals)
1906–07	Geelong	5 (2)
- ^{1} Playing statistics correct to the end of 1907.

William Alfred Getsom (11 January 1885 – 6 August 1954) was an Australian rules footballer who played with Geelong in the Victorian Football League (VFL).
