= Bob Gazzard =

Australian rules footballer

Personal information
- Full name: Bob Gazzard
- Born: 26 September 1935 (age 91)
- Original team: Colac
- Height: 183 cm (6 ft 0 in)
- Weight: 76 kg (168 lb)
- Position: Fullback

Playing career^{1}
Years	Club	Games (Goals)
1954–59	Geelong	71 (2)
- ^{1} Playing statistics correct to the end of 1959.

Bob Gazzard (born 26 September 1935) is a former Australian rules footballer who played with Geelong in the Victorian Football League (VFL).
