= Lionel Barclay =

Australian rules footballer

Personal information
- Full name: Lionel Barclay
- Born: 23 December 1920
- Died: 6 July 2006 (aged 85)
- Original team: North Geelong
- Height: 175 cm (5 ft 9 in)
- Weight: 66 kg (146 lb)

Playing career^{1}
Years	Club	Games (Goals)
1944–45	Geelong	12 (7)
- ^{1} Playing statistics correct to the end of 1945.

Lionel Barclay (23 December 1920 – 6 July 2006) was an Australian rules footballer who played with Geelong in the Victorian Football League (VFL).
