= Reg Todd =

Australian rules footballer

Personal information
- Full name: Reginald Percy Todd
- Born: 4 October 1889; Buninyong, Victoria
- Died: 8 October 1960 (aged 71); Ballarat, Victoria
- Original team: Chilwell

Playing career^{1}
Years	Club	Games (Goals)
1910	Geelong	2 (0)
- ^{1} Playing statistics correct to the end of 1910.

Reginald Percy Todd (4 October 1889 – 8 October 1960) was an Australian rules footballer who played with Geelong in the Victorian Football League (VFL).
