= Jim Tuckwell =

Australian rules footballer

Personal information
- Full name: Jim Tuckwell
- Born: 23 July 1927
- Died: 14 January 1984 (aged 56)
- Original teams: Newtown and Chilwell
- Height: 185 cm (6 ft 1 in)
- Weight: 89 kg (196 lb)

Playing career^{1}
Years	Club	Games (Goals)
1949–52	Geelong	22 (0)
- ^{1} Playing statistics correct to the end of 1952.

Jim Tuckwell (23 July 1927 – 14 January 1984) was an Australian rules footballer who played with Geelong in the Victorian Football League (VFL).
