= Jock Lineen (footballer, born 1890) =

Australian rules footballer (1890–1954)

Personal information
- Full name: John Augustave Lineen
- Born: 12 August 1890; Colac, Victoria
- Died: 2 January 1954 (aged 63); Cororooke, Victoria
- Original team: Cororooke
- Height: 183 cm (6 ft 0 in)
- Weight: 83 kg (183 lb)

Playing career^{1}
Years	Club	Games (Goals)
1921	Geelong	1 (0)
- ^{1} Playing statistics correct to the end of 1921.

John Augustave Lineen (12 August 1890 – 2 January 1954) was an Australian rules footballer who played with Geelong in the Victorian Football League (VFL).
