= Neville Martin (footballer) =

Australian rules footballer

Personal information
- Full name: Neville Martin
- Born: 14 August 1936
- Original team: Swan Hill
- Height: 188 cm (6 ft 2 in)
- Weight: 83 kg (183 lb)

Playing career^{1}
Years	Club	Games (Goals)
1958	Geelong	18 (4)
- ^{1} Playing statistics correct to the end of 1958.

Neville Martin (born 14 August 1936) is a former Australian rules footballer who played with Geelong in the Victorian Football League (VFL).
