= Len Martin (footballer) =

Australian rules footballer

Personal information
- Full name: Leonard Houghton Geoffrey Martin
- Born: 19 April 1887; Geelong, Victoria
- Died: 26 December 1943 (aged 56); Geelong, Victoria
- Original team: Richmond (VFA)
- Height: 179 cm (5 ft 10 in)
- Weight: 74 kg (163 lb)
- Position: Half Forward / Back Pocket

Playing career^{1}
Years	Club	Games (Goals)
1906, 1910–13	Geelong	61 (24)
- ^{1} Playing statistics correct to the end of 1913.

Leonard Houghton Geoffrey Martin (19 April 1887 – 26 December 1943) was an Australian rules footballer who played with Geelong in the Victorian Football League (VFL).
