= Tony Boulton =

Australian rules footballer

Personal information
- Full name: Tony Boulton
- Born: 10 June 1939
- Original team: Boort / South Bendigo
- Height: 183 cm (6 ft 0 in)
- Weight: 73 kg (161 lb)

Playing career^{1}
Years	Club	Games (Goals)
1959	Geelong	1 (0)
- ^{1} Playing statistics correct to the end of 1959.

Tony Boulton (born 10 June 1939) is a former Australian rules footballer who played with Geelong in the Victorian Football League (VFL).
