= Alf Horman =

Australian rules footballer

Personal information
- Full name: Alfred Horman
- Born: 11 April 1885; Geelong, Victoria
- Died: 6 November 1968 (aged 83); Heidelberg, Victoria
- Original team: Barwon

Playing career^{1}
Years	Club	Games (Goals)
1906	Geelong	2 (1)
- ^{1} Playing statistics correct to the end of 1906.

Alfred Horman (11 April 1885 – 6 November 1968) was an Australian rules footballer who played for the Geelong Football Club in the Victorian Football League (VFL).
