= Henry Cheeseman =

Australian rules footballer

Personal information
- Full name: Henry Albert Cheeseman
- Born: 20 December 1875; Kew, Victoria
- Died: 18 September 1956 (aged 80); Melbourne, Victoria
- Original team: Ararat

Playing career^{1}
Years	Club	Games (Goals)
1904	Geelong	1 (1)
- ^{1} Playing statistics correct to the end of 1904.

Henry Albert Cheeseman (20 December 1875 – 18 September 1956) was an Australian rules footballer who played with Geelong in the Victorian Football League (VFL).
