= Ron Sceney =

Australian rules footballer, born 1917

Personal information
- Full name: Ronald Vernon Sceney
- Born: 12 October 1917; Geelong, Victoria
- Died: 2 April 2003 (aged 85)
- Original team: Geelong High School Old Boys
- Height: 168 cm (5 ft 6 in)
- Weight: 65 kg (143 lb)

Playing career^{1}
Years	Club	Games (Goals)
1940	Geelong	2 (3)
- ^{1} Playing statistics correct to the end of 1940.

Ronald Vernon Sceney (12 October 1917 – 2 April 2003) was an Australian rules footballer who played with Geelong in the Victorian Football League (VFL).

Sceney also served in the Australian Army during World War Two.
