= Frank McWilliams =

Australian rules footballer, born 1915

Personal information
- Full name: Frank Kenneth McWilliams
- Born: 25 November 1915; Leopold, Victoria
- Died: 11 December 1957 (aged 42); Melbourne, Victoria
- Original team: East Geelong
- Height: 168 cm (5 ft 6 in)
- Weight: 70 kg (154 lb)

Playing career^{1}
Years	Club	Games (Goals)
1944	Geelong	6 (0)
- ^{1} Playing statistics correct to the end of 1944.

Frank Kenneth McWilliams (25 November 1915 – 11 December 1957) was an Australian rules footballer who played with Geelong in the Victorian Football League (VFL).
