= Bruce Webb =

Australian rules footballer (1939–2020)

Personal information
- Full name: Bruce John Cramer Webb
- Born: 27 November 1939
- Died: 6 April 2020 (aged 80)
- Original team: Beeac
- Height: 175 cm (5 ft 9 in)
- Weight: 64 kg (141 lb)

Playing career^{1}
Years	Club	Games (Goals)
1960	Geelong	4 (3)
- ^{1} Playing statistics correct to the end of 1960.

Bruce John Cramer Webb (27 November 1939 – 6 April 2020) was an Australian rules footballer who played with Geelong in the Victorian Football League (VFL).
