= Bert Dalton =

Australian rules footballer

Personal information
- Full name: Albert Richard Dalton
- Born: 22 August 1891; Lubeck, Victoria
- Died: 30 January 1969 (aged 77); Geelong, Victoria
- Original team: Barwon
- Height: 180 cm (5 ft 11 in)
- Weight: 72 kg (159 lb)
- Position: Halfback

Playing career^{1}
| Years | Club | Games (Goals) |
| 1909–1915 | Geelong | 60 (0) |
- ^{1} Playing statistics correct to the end of 1915.

Albert Richard Dalton (22 August 1891 – 30 January 1969) was an Australian rules footballer who played for the Geelong Football Club in the Victorian Football League (VFL).
