= Jim Harbison =

Australian rules footballer, born 1911

Personal information
- Full name: James Harbison
- Born: 22 September 1911; Swan Hill, Victoria
- Died: 27 November 1982 (aged 71); Leederville, Western Australia
- Original team: Daylesford

Playing career^{1}
Years	Club	Games (Goals)
1932	Geelong	5 (3)
- ^{1} Playing statistics correct to the end of 1932.

James Harbison (22 September 1911 – 27 November 1982) was an Australian rules footballer who played with Geelong in the Victorian Football League (VFL).
