= Edmund Webber =

Australian rules footballer

Personal information
- Full name: Edmund Charles Somerset Webber
- Born: 12 March 1894; Geelong, Victoria
- Died: 26 August 1966 (aged 72); Geelong, Victoria
- Original team: Chilwell
- Height: 180 cm (5 ft 11 in)
- Weight: 79 kg (174 lb)

Playing career^{1}
Years	Club	Games (Goals)
1912–13	Geelong	6 (3)
- ^{1} Playing statistics correct to the end of 1913.

Edmund Charles Somerset Webber (12 March 1894 – 26 August 1966) was an Australian rules footballer who played with Geelong in the Victorian Football League (VFL).
