= Doug Jerram =

Australian rules footballer

Personal information
- Full name: Douglas Harry Jerram
- Born: 10 March 1922; Geelong, Victoria
- Died: 26 May 2012 (aged 90); Geelong, Victoria
- Original team: North Geelong
- Height: 170 cm (5 ft 7 in)
- Weight: 67 kg (148 lb)

Playing career^{1}
Years	Club	Games (Goals)
1941, 1944–47	Geelong	24 (18)
- ^{1} Playing statistics correct to the end of 1947.

Douglas Harry Jerram (10 March 1922 – 26 May 2012) was an Australian rules footballer who played with Geelong in the Victorian Football League (VFL).
