= Tim Colley =

Australian rules footballer

Timothy George Colley

Personal information
- Full name: Timothy George Colley
- Born: 8 August 1950 (age 76); Geelong
- Original team: Newtown
- Height: 188 cm (6 ft 2 in)
- Weight: 95 kg (209 lb)
- Position: Centre half forward / ruck

Playing career^{1}
Years	Club	Games (Goals)
1970 — 1971	Geelong	6 (1)
- ^{1} Playing statistics correct to the end of 1971.

Timothy Colley (born 8 August 1950) is a former Australian rules footballer who played for Geelong in the Victorian Football League (now known as the Australian Football League).
