= Stan McGregor =

Australian rules footballer

Personal information
- Full name: Staney Bergen McGregor
- Born: 11 May 1895; Ballarat East, Victoria
- Died: 26 July 1964 (aged 69); Ballarat, Victoria

Playing career^{1}
Years	Club	Games (Goals)
1923	Geelong	2 (0)
- ^{1} Playing statistics correct to the end of 1923.

Stanley Bergen McGregor (11 May 1895 – 26 July 1964) was an Australian rules footballer who played with Geelong in the Victorian Football League (VFL).
