= Reg Digby =

Australian rules footballer

Personal information
- Full name: Reginald Charles Digby
- Born: 21 January 1879; Geelong, Victoria
- Died: 16 March 1958 (aged 79); Geelong, Victoria
- Original team: Marylebone

Playing career^{1}
Years	Club	Games (Goals)
1904	Geelong	2 (1)
- ^{1} Playing statistics correct to the end of 1904.

Reginald Charles Digby (21 January 1879 – 16 March 1958) was an Australian rules footballer who played with Geelong in the Victorian Football League (VFL).
