= Doug Scale =

Australian rules footballer

Personal information
- Full name: Douglas Henry Alexander Scale
- Nickname: Doug Scale
- Born: 24 January 1954 (age 72)
- Original team: Belmont

Playing career^{1}
| Years | Club | Games (Goals) |
| 1974—75 | Geelong | 11 (0) |
- ^{1} Playing statistics correct to the end of 1975.

Douglas Henry Alexander Scale (more commonly known as Doug Scale; born 24 January 1954) is a former Australian rules footballer who played for Geelong in the Victorian Football League (now known as the Australian Football League).
