= Ray Jones (footballer, born 1924) =

Australian rules footballer (1924–2007)

Personal information
- Full name: Raymond Leslie Jones
- Born: 17 February 1924; Ballarat, Victoria, Australia
- Died: 1 October 2007 (aged 83)
- Height: 168 cm (5 ft 6 in)
- Weight: 82 kg (181 lb)

Playing career^{1}
Years	Club	Games (Goals)
1950	Geelong	2 (0)
- ^{1} Playing statistics correct to the end of 1950.

Raymond Leslie Jones (17 February 1924 – 1 October 2007) was an Australian rules footballer who played with Geelong in the Victorian Football League (VFL). Jones died on 1 October 2007, at the age of 83.
