= Bruce Peake =

Australian rules footballer (1937–2022)

Personal information
- Full name: Bruce Peake
- Born: 27 January 1937
- Died: 31 July 2022 (aged 85); Geelong
- Height: 191 cm (6 ft 3 in)
- Weight: 86 kg (190 lb)

Playing career^{1}
| Years | Club | Games (Goals) |
| 1958–61 | Geelong | 25 (9) |
- ^{1} Playing statistics correct to the end of 1961.

Bruce Peake (27 January 1937 – 31 July 2022) was an Australian rules footballer who played with Geelong in the Victorian Football League (VFL).
