= Stan Wayth =

Australian rules footballer

Personal information
- Full name: Stanley Ernest Wayth
- Born: 28 June 1883; Queenscliff, Victoria
- Died: 13 June 1932 (aged 48); Geelong, Victoria
- Original team: Queenscliff

Playing career^{1}
Years	Club	Games (Goals)
1903	Geelong	1 (0)
- ^{1} Playing statistics correct to the end of 1903.

Stanley Ernest Wayth (28 June 1883 – 13 June 1932) was an Australian rules footballer who played with Geelong in the Victorian Football League (VFL).
