= Frank Murrells =

Australian rules footballer, born 1902

Personal information
- Full name: Frank Murrells
- Born: 15 September 1902
- Died: 29 July 2000 (aged 97)
- Height: 169 cm (5 ft 7 in)
- Weight: 60 kg (132 lb)

Playing career^{1}
Years	Club	Games (Goals)
1924–25	Geelong	4 (1)
- ^{1} Playing statistics correct to the end of 1925.

Frank Murrells (15 September 1902 – 29 July 2000) was an Australian rules footballer who played with Geelong in the Victorian Football League (VFL).
