= Vic Buchanan =

Australian rules footballer

Personal information
- Full name: Victor Hugh Buchanan
- Born: 27 February 1899; Geelong, Victoria
- Died: 27 May 1966 (aged 67); Geelong, Victoria
- Original team: Barwon

Playing career^{1}
Years	Club	Games (Goals)
1921	Geelong	1 (0)
- ^{1} Playing statistics correct to the end of 1921.

Victor Hugh Buchanan (27 February 1899 – 27 May 1966) was an Australian rules footballer who played a single game with Geelong in the Victorian Football League (VFL) in 1921.
