= Bruce Mills =

Australian rules footballer, born 1901

Personal information
- Full name: Lancelot Bruce Mills
- Born: 24 December 1901; Geelong, Victoria
- Died: 19 October 1936 (aged 34); Geelong, Victoria
- Height: 175 cm (5 ft 9 in)
- Weight: 78 kg (172 lb)

Playing career^{1}
Years	Club	Games (Goals)
1926	Geelong	9 (3)
- ^{1} Playing statistics correct to the end of 1926.

Lancelot Bruce Mills (24 December 1901 – 19 October 1936) was an Australian rules footballer who played with Geelong in the Victorian Football League (VFL).
