= Ern Everett =

Australian rules footballer

Personal information
- Full name: Ernest Pearson Everett
- Born: 31 October 1892; Geelong, Victoria
- Died: 19 April 1967 (aged 74); South Melbourne, Victoria

Playing career^{1}
Years	Club	Games (Goals)
1918	Geelong	1 (0)
- ^{1} Playing statistics correct to the end of 1918.

Ernest Pearson Everett (31 October 1892 – 19 April 1967) was an Australian rules footballer who played with Geelong in the Victorian Football League (VFL).
