= Bill Cooke =

Bill Cooke may refer to:

- Bill Cooke (defensive end) (born 1951), American football defensive end
- Bill Cooke (American football coach), American football coach
- Bill Cooke (footballer) (1883–1956), Australian rules footballer

== See also ==
- William Cook (disambiguation)
- William Cooke (disambiguation)
