= Sam Stivey =

Australian sportsman (1881–1943)

Personal information
- Full name: Samuel Tremaine Stivey
- Born: 15 March 1881; Sandridge, Victoria
- Died: 21 March 1943 (aged 62); Perth, Western Australia
- Height: 170 cm (5 ft 7 in)
- Weight: 66 kg (146 lb)
- Position: Wing

Playing career^{1}
Years	Club	Games (Goals)	
unknown	Boulder City	unknown	
1902–03	Carlton	2 (0)	
1903	Port Melbourne	unknown	

Umpiring career
Years	League	Role	Games
1904–08	GFA	Field umpire	
1904	WASP	Field umpire	
- ^{1} Playing statistics correct to the end of 1903.

Career highlights
- Umpired the 1904 West Australian State Premiership match.

Samuel Tremaine Stivey (15 March 1881 – 21 March 1943) was an Australian sportsman.

He played and umpired Australian rules football at senior level in two states of Australia, including for the Boulder City Football Club in the Goldfields Football Association (GFA), the Carlton Football Club in the Victorian Football League (VFL), and the Port Melbourne Football Club in the Victorian Football Association (VFA). Stivey later became a noted boxer in bouts held in Perth and Kalgoorlie during the late 1920s and early 1930s.

== Family ==
The son of John Thomas Stivey (1856-1931), and Kate Stivey (1857-1935), née Gronous, Samuel Tremaine Stivey was born in Sandridge, later known as Port Melbourne on 15 March 1881.

He married Catherine Watson (1883-1969) in Perth, in 1902.

== Football ==
He emigrated to the goldfields of Western Australia during the Western Australian gold rush in the late 19th century.

=== Boulder City (GFA) ===
Stivey played football for Boulder City in the Goldfields Football Association (GFA) during the 1890s and early 1900s.

=== Umpire (GFA) ===
He was also a noted umpire, with Dave Strickland considering him "the best adjudicator of our national game with the exception of Ivo Crapp". He umpired several GFA grand finals, as well as the 1904 West Australian State Premiership, between Railways and West Perth.

Stivey was at the centre of a controversy in October 1905, when, despite being considered the best umpire in the league at the time, he was passed over for the final match of the season, between Railways and Mines Rovers, in favour of another umpire, who allegedly favoured Railways during the match. Allegations were made by Mines Rovers players that "Railways had bought the premiership", although no action was taken by the league.

=== Carlton (VFL) ===
Stivey moved back to Victoria for the 1902 season, where he represented Carlton in the Victorian Football League (VFL). He played two matches for Carlton, making his debut in the last round of the 1902 VFL season, against Essendon at Princes Park. His only other match came against Collingwood in round one of the 1903 VFL season.

=== Port Melbourne (VFA) ===
Having transferred from Carlton, he played eight matches for Port Melbourne in the Victorian Football Association (VFA) in 1903.

== Military service and later life ==
Stivey enlisted for active service at the beginning of the First World War in 1914, but was considered too old, and was restricted to home duties. He joined the supply section of the Medical Corps, and was made a Staff Sergeant. During the final months of the war, he was transferred to the Corps Sea Transport division, sailing to England from Sydney. On his reenlistment in 1918, Stivey's occupation was noted as masseur, and his religion Presbyterianism.

== Boxing ==
Stivey returned to Perth at the conclusion of the war. He began competing as a boxer in 1924, beginning in featherweight bouts at Uglieland carnivals and at the Unity Theatre in Perth, and later progressing to open-air bouts held at a number of different venues in Perth and Kalgoorlie. Overall, Stivey competed in 54 fights, winning 28, losing fourteen, and drawing eleven.

== Death ==
He died at Perth, Western Australia, on 21 March 1943.

== See also ==
- List of Carlton Football Club players
