= List of current Australian Football League coaches =

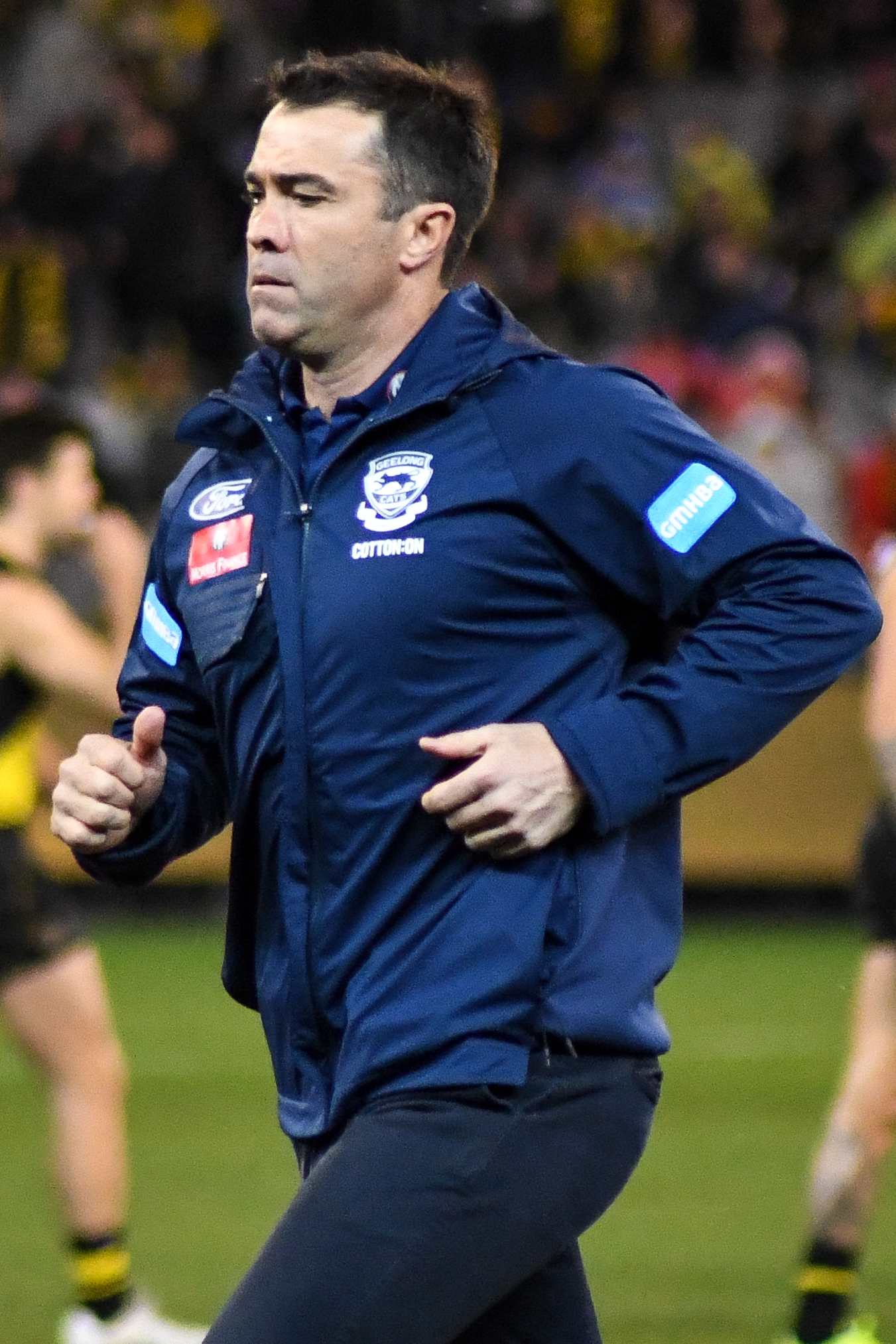
Chris Scott is currently the longest-serving coach in the Australian Football League.

This list includes the appointment date and performance record of current Australian Football League senior coaches. The league consists of 18 clubs across Australia.

Chris Scott, the senior coach of the Geelong Cats since October 2010, is currently the longest-serving coach in the league. He has won two premierships, won the most matches (261) and has a winning percentage of 68.2%.

Four current coaches have won at least one AFL premiership during their current term: Luke Beveridge in 2016, Chris Scott in 2011 and 2022, and Craig McRae in 2023. Damien Hardwick won three premierships with his previous club prior to his current appointment.

== Coaches ==
Key

Prem	Premiership wins
W	Wins
L	Losses
D	Draws
GC	Games coached
Win%	Winning percentage
Profile	Coaching statistics on the AFL Tables website
Refs	References used in addition to AFL Tables

Statistics are correct to the end of the 2026 season.

Club	Name	Time as coach	First season as coach		W	L	D	GC	Win%		W	L	D	GC	Win%	Played for	Past clubs as an assistant^{a} or senior^{s} coach (Note: Development coaches included as assistants. Caretaker coaches included as senior coaches.)	Profile	Refs
Club	Name	Time as coach	First season as coach	Current (Note: Coaching statistics from the current term with the team; coaching statistics from previous term with the team are not included.)						Career (Note: Coaching statistics for career in the AFL; records in other leagues are not included.)						Played for	Past clubs as an assistant^{a} or senior^{s} coach	Profile	Refs
Adelaide	Matthew Nicks	7 years, 37 days	2020	0	71	84	1	156	45.8	0	71	84	1	156	45.8	Sydney	Port Adelaide^{a}	Profile	
Adelaide	Matthew Nicks	7 years, 37 days	2020	0	71	84	1	156	45.8	0	71	84	1	156	45.8	Sydney	Greater Western Sydney^{a}	Profile	
Brisbane Lions	Cameron Bruce	11 days	2027	0	0	0	0	0	—N/a	0	0	0	0	0	—N/a	Melbourne	Hawthorn^{a}		
Brisbane Lions	Cameron Bruce	11 days	2027	0	0	0	0	0	—N/a	0	0	0	0	0	—N/a	Melbourne	Carlton^{a}		
Brisbane Lions	Cameron Bruce	11 days	2027	0	0	0	0	0	—N/a	0	0	0	0	0	—N/a	Hawthorn	Brisbane Lions^{a}		
Carlton	Josh Fraser	193 days (Note: Fraser was appointed as caretaker coach on 12 May 2026, then as permanent coach on 18 August 2026. The time as head coach and statistics listed here include his time as caretaker.)	2026	0	12	3	1	16	78.1	0	12	3	1	16	78.1	Collingwood	Gold Coast^{a}	Profile	
Carlton	Josh Fraser	193 days	2026	0	12	3	1	16	78.1	0	12	3	1	16	78.1	Collingwood	Carlton^{a}	Profile	
Carlton	Josh Fraser	193 days	2026	0	12	3	1	16	78.1	0	12	3	1	16	78.1	Gold Coast	Collingwood^{a}	Profile	
Collingwood	Craig McRae	5 years, 81 days	2022	1	79	40	4	123	65.9	1	79	40	4	123	65.9	Brisbane Bears	Richmond^{a}	Profile	
Collingwood	Craig McRae	5 years, 81 days	2022	1	79	40	4	123	65.9	1	79	40	4	123	65.9	Brisbane Bears	Brisbane Lions^{a}	Profile	
Collingwood	Craig McRae	5 years, 81 days	2022	1	79	40	4	123	65.9	1	79	40	4	123	65.9	Brisbane Lions	Collingwood^{a}	Profile	
Collingwood	Craig McRae	5 years, 81 days	2022	1	79	40	4	123	65.9	1	79	40	4	123	65.9	Brisbane Lions	Hawthorn^{a}	Profile	
Essendon	Mark McVeigh	89 days	2027	0	0	0	0	0	—N/a	0	4	9	0	13	30.8	Essendon	Greater Western Sydney^{a, s}	Profile	
Essendon	Mark McVeigh	89 days	2027	0	0	0	0	0	—N/a	0	4	9	0	13	30.8	Essendon	Sydney^{a}	Profile	
Fremantle	Justin Longmuir	7 years, 52 days	2020	0	90	66	2	158	57.6	0	90	66	2	158	57.6	Fremantle	Fremantle^{a}	Profile	
Fremantle	Justin Longmuir	7 years, 52 days	2020	0	90	66	2	158	57.6	0	90	66	2	158	57.6	Fremantle	West Coast^{a}	Profile	
Fremantle	Justin Longmuir	7 years, 52 days	2020	0	90	66	2	158	57.6	0	90	66	2	158	57.6	Fremantle	Collingwood^{a}	Profile	
Geelong	Chris Scott	16 years, 34 days	2011	2	261	121	3	385	68.2	2	261	121	3	385	68.2	Brisbane Bears	Fremantle^{a}	Profile	
Geelong	Chris Scott	16 years, 34 days	2011	2	261	121	3	385	68.2	2	261	121	3	385	68.2	Brisbane Lions	Fremantle^{a}	Profile	
Gold Coast	Damien Hardwick	3 years, 92 days	2024	0	36	35	0	71	50.7	3	206	166	6	378	55.3	Essendon	Hawthorn^{a}	Profile	
Gold Coast	Damien Hardwick	3 years, 92 days	2024	0	36	35	0	71	50.7	3	206	166	6	378	55.3	Port Adelaide	Richmond^{s}	Profile	
Greater Western Sydney	Adam Kingsley	4 years, 91 days	2023	0	56	42	0	98	57.1	0	56	42	0	98	57.1	Port Adelaide	Port Adelaide^{a}	Profile	
Greater Western Sydney	Adam Kingsley	4 years, 91 days	2023	0	56	42	0	98	57.1	0	56	42	0	98	57.1	Port Adelaide	St Kilda^{a}	Profile	
Greater Western Sydney	Adam Kingsley	4 years, 91 days	2023	0	56	42	0	98	57.1	0	56	42	0	98	57.1	Port Adelaide	Richmond^{a}	Profile	
Hawthorn	Sam Mitchell	5 years, 92 days (Note: It was initially announced on 6 July 2021 that Mitchell would succeed Alastair Clarkson as Hawthorn coach at the end of the 2022 season. However, on 30 July, it was announced that Clarkson would instead step down and be replaced by Mitchell at the end of the 2021 season. Mitchell's start date as Hawthorn coach is considered here to be the date of the club's last match of the 2021 season (21 August 2021).)	2022	0	63	56	2	121	52.9	0	63	56	2	121	52.9	Hawthorn	West Coast^{a}	Profile	
Hawthorn	Sam Mitchell	5 years, 92 days	2022	0	63	56	2	121	52.9	0	63	56	2	121	52.9	West Coast	Hawthorn^{a}	Profile	
Melbourne	Steven King	1 year, 55 days (Note: King was announced as Melbourne's coach on 12 September 2019. However, he was serving as an assistant coach at Geelong at the time, and finished the season with Geelong before officially taking over at Melbourne. His start date as Melbourne coach is considered here to be the date of Geelong's last match of the 2025 season (27 September 2025).)	2026	0	15	9	0	24	62.5	0	17	14	0	31	54.8	Geelong	St Kilda^{a}	Profile	
Melbourne	Steven King	1 year, 55 days	2026	0	15	9	0	24	62.5	0	17	14	0	31	54.8	Geelong	Western Bulldogs^{a}	Profile	
Melbourne	Steven King	1 year, 55 days	2026	0	15	9	0	24	62.5	0	17	14	0	31	54.8	St Kilda	Gold Coast^{a, s}	Profile	
Melbourne	Steven King	1 year, 55 days	2026	0	15	9	0	24	62.5	0	17	14	0	31	54.8	St Kilda	Geelong^{a}	Profile	
North Melbourne	Jaymie Graham	46 days	2027	0	0	0	0	0	—N/a	0	3	3	0	0	100.0	West Coast	St Kilda^{a}	Profile	
North Melbourne	Jaymie Graham	46 days	2027	0	0	0	0	0	—N/a	0	3	3	0	0	100.0	West Coast	West Coast^{a, s}	Profile	
North Melbourne	Jaymie Graham	46 days	2027	0	0	0	0	0	—N/a	0	3	3	0	0	100.0	West Coast	Fremantle^{a, s}	Profile	
Port Adelaide	Josh Carr	1 year, 91 days (Note: It was announced on 12 February 2025 that Carr would succeed Ken Hinkley as Port Adelaide coach at the end of the 2025 season. Carr's start date as Port Adelaide coach is considered here to be the date of the club's last match of the 2025 season (22 August 2025).)	2026	0	7	16	0	23	30.4	0	7	16	0	23	30.4	Port Adelaide	Port Adelaide^{a}	Profile	
Port Adelaide	Josh Carr	1 year, 91 days	2026	0	7	16	0	23	30.4	0	7	16	0	23	30.4	Fremantle	Fremantle^{a}	Profile	
Richmond	Adem Yze	3 years, 61 days	2024	0	10	59	0	69	14.5	0	11	59	0	70	15.7	Melbourne	Hawthorn^{a}	Profile	
Richmond	Adem Yze	3 years, 61 days	2024	0	10	59	0	69	14.5	0	11	59	0	70	15.7	Melbourne	Melbourne^{a, s}	Profile	
St Kilda	Ross Lyon	4 years, 28 days	2023	0	43	50	0	93	46.2	0	215	178	5	398	54.7	Fitzroy	Richmond^{a}	Profile	
St Kilda	Ross Lyon	4 years, 28 days	2023	0	43	50	0	93	46.2	0	215	178	5	398	54.7	Fitzroy	Carlton^{a}	Profile	
St Kilda	Ross Lyon	4 years, 28 days	2023	0	43	50	0	93	46.2	0	215	178	5	398	54.7	Fitzroy	Sydney^{a}	Profile	
St Kilda	Ross Lyon	4 years, 28 days	2023	0	43	50	0	93	46.2	0	215	178	5	398	54.7	Brisbane Bears	St Kilda^{s}	Profile	
St Kilda	Ross Lyon	4 years, 28 days	2023	0	43	50	0	93	46.2	0	215	178	5	398	54.7	Brisbane Bears	Fremantle^{s}	Profile	
Sydney	Dean Cox	1 year, 360 days	2025	0	31	17	0	48	64.6	0	31	17	0	48	64.6	West Coast	West Coast^{a}	Profile	
Sydney	Dean Cox	1 year, 360 days	2025	0	31	17	0	48	64.6	0	31	17	0	48	64.6	West Coast	Sydney^{a}	Profile	
West Coast	Andrew McQualter	2 years, 52 days	2025	0	5	41	0	46	10.9	0	12	47	0	59	20.3	St Kilda	Richmond^{a, s}	Profile	
West Coast	Andrew McQualter	2 years, 52 days	2025	0	5	41	0	46	10.9	0	12	47	0	59	20.3	Gold Coast	Melbourne^{a}	Profile	
Western Bulldogs	Luke Beveridge	12 years, 7 days	2015	1	158	119	1	278	57.0	1	158	119	1	278	57.0	Melbourne	Collingwood^{a}	Profile	
Western Bulldogs	Luke Beveridge	12 years, 7 days	2015	1	158	119	1	278	57.0	1	158	119	1	278	57.0	Western Bulldogs	Collingwood^{a}	Profile	
Western Bulldogs	Luke Beveridge	12 years, 7 days	2015	1	158	119	1	278	57.0	1	158	119	1	278	57.0	St Kilda	Hawthorn^{a}	Profile	

== See also ==
- List of current AFL Women's coaches
