= Dolph Heinrichs =

Australian rules footballer & cricketer (1883–1967)

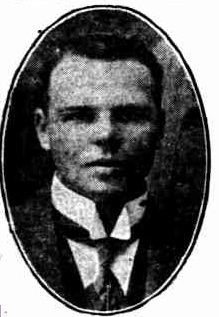

Personal information
- Full name: Adolphos Heinrich Julius Carl Heinrichs
- Born: 28 April 1883; Germany
- Died: 24 June 1967 (aged 84); Adelaide
- Original team: Imperials Juniors

Playing career^{1}
Years	Club	Games (Goals)
1899–1900, 1905–06	East Fremantle	60 (64)
1901	Kalgoorlie	?
1902–04	North Fremantle	44
1910	Mines Rovers	?
- ^{1} Playing statistics correct to the end of 1906.

Adolphos Heinrich Julius Carl "Dolph" Heinrichs (28 April 1883 – 24 June 1967) was an Australian rules footballer who played with East Fremantle and North Fremantle in the West Australian Football Association (WAFA). He also represented the Western Australian cricket team in two first-class cricket matches.

Heinrichs was born in Germany and immigrated with his family to Australia shortly after his birth. He spent some of his childhood in Victoria but played his junior football in Western Australia, prior to joining East Fremantle in 1899.

He played with East Fremantle for two years and then went to the Western Australian Goldfields where he played with Kalgoorlie in the 1901 Goldfields Football Association season. The following year he was back in the WAFA, but this time at North Fremantle, who were playing their inaugural season.

In 1904, while still with North Fremantle, Heinrich was called up to the state team, for a tour of Victoria and South Australia. He made his interstate debut on 8 August, against Victoria at the Melbourne Cricket Ground, playing from the back pocket. Although a defender, he was tried at full-forward for the match two weeks later against South Australia at Jubilee Oval. He performed well, kicking five of his team's 10 goals in a nine-point win.

As a result of his efforts in Adelaide, East Fremantle used him as a forward when he returned to the club in 1905. He was a member of their 1906 premiership winning team, playing with his younger brother Albert. Another brother, Wilhelm, would also later play at East Fremantle.

The 1906 grand final win over West Perth was the last of his 60 league games, which had brought 64 goals. He retired as a player but remained in the league for several seasons as an umpire. He was appointed the coach of South Fremantle Football Club midway through the 1925 WAFL season.

In the 1922/23 cricket season, Heinrichs played his two first-class matches for Western Australia and finished with an impressive average of 63.50 from three innings. This was largely due to his score on debut, 91 not out, against the Marylebone Cricket Club at the WACA Ground in Perth. He had batted at four on that occasion and was promoted to opener for the match against New South Wales at the same venue later in the summer. He was dismissed in both innings, both scores of 12 and 24.

Heinrichs worked at the Education Department for many years, teaching in schools across the state. He was the mentor of Australian Test cricketer Ernest Bromley.

He later had a book published entitled The Jubilee Book, which covers the history of the East Fremantle Football Club up until 1947.

== See also ==
- List of Western Australia first-class cricketers
