= William Cooke =

William Cooke or Bill Cooke may refer to:

== Sports ==
- Harry Cooke (born William Henry Cooke, 1919–1992), English footballer
- William Cooke (cricketer) (1868–1954), New Zealand cricketer
- William Cooke (footballer) (1915–?), English footballer
- Bill Cooke (defensive end) (born 1951), American football defensive end
- Bill Cooke (American football coach), American football coach
- Bill Cooke (footballer) (1888–1950), Australian rules footballer
- Billy Cooke (weightlifter) (born 1933), Northern Irish weightlifter and strongman

== Politicians ==
- William Cooke (died 1558), member of parliament (MP) for New Woodstock and Portsmouth
- William Cooke (died 1589), MP for Stamford and Grantham
- Sir William Cooke (of Highnam) (1572–1619), English MP
- William Cooke (died 1703) (1620–1703), MP for Gloucester
- William Cooke (1682–1709), MP for Gloucester
- William Mordecai Cooke Sr. (1823–1863), Confederate politician
- William Cooke, MP for Lewes
- William Wilcox Cooke (died 1816), associate justice of the Tennessee Supreme Court

== Others ==
- William Fothergill Cooke (1806–1879), English inventor
- William Ernest Cooke (1863–1947), Australian astronomer
- William Cooke (Methodist) (1806–1884), Methodist New Connexion
- William Cooke (Provost of King's College) (1711–1797), academic and Church of England priest
- William Cooke (priest, born 1821) (1821–1894), Church of England priest and hymn-writer
- William Bernard Cooke (1778–1855), English line engraver
- William Bridge Cooke (1908–1991), American mycologist
- William Gordon Cooke (1803–1847), New Orleans druggist and major in the Texian Army
- William Cooke (died c. 1641), English publisher, see Andrew Crooke and William Cooke
- Sir William Bryan Cooke, 8th Baronet (1782–1851), of the Cooke baronets
- Sir William Ridley Charles Cooke, 9th Baronet (1827–1894), of the Cooke baronets
- Sir William Cooke, 10th Baronet (1872–1964), soldier, breeder of racehorses and orchid breeder
- William W. Cooke (1846–1876), US officer killed at the Battle of Little Bighorn
- William Wilson Cooke (1871–1949), American architect
- 3894 Williamcooke, asteroid named for William Ernest Cooke
- William Cooke (performer) (1808–1886), English showman, animal trainer, and circus proprietor

== See also ==
- William Cook (disambiguation)
