= Australian rules football in the Goldfields region of Western Australia =

Australian rules football has been played in the Goldfields region of Western Australia since the late 1890s, when the Western Australian gold rush brought an influx of immigrants from Victoria and South Australia, bringing the sport with them.

For much of the early 20th century, the standard of football in the Goldfields was considered equal to that of the coastal West Australian Football League (WAFL). The Goldfields were awarded a separate seat on the Australian National Football Council from 1903 to 1919, although both leagues combined to form one Western Australian representative team for National Carnivals during this time. The quality of football declined after World War I, although a Goldfields Football League representative team defeated both Claremont and Port Adelaide in 1939.

== History ==
=== Early history ===
Two teams – Rovers and Coolgardie – existed in Coolgardie by 1894, although matches were infrequent and unorganised, with no standardised rules. The Hannans Football Club was formed on 3 May 1895 at a meeting at the Exchange Hotel in Kalgoorlie. The White Feather and Great Boulder Football Clubs were formed later that year, with

A separate Coolgardie Football Association existed from 1895.

The West Perth Football Club proposed twice, in 1896 and 1897, to tour the goldfields, playing matches in Coolgardie and Kalgoorlie. However, these invitations were declined by the goldfields clubs, due to problems obtaining funding and with the condition of the Goldfields grounds. A Coolgardie representative team toured Perth in August/September 1896, and were entertained at St. George's Hall in the city by local politicians and representatives of the Western Australian Football Association. The team played one match against a "combined juniors" team, winning 3.15 (33) to 3.5 (23), and other matches in Perth and Fremantle.

=== Post World-War 1 ===
In 1919, the Goldfields Football Association were compelled to withdraw from the Australasian Football Council. Previously, a situation had existed where the two representatives on the council accorded to Western Australia were divided between the WAFL and the GFA. While attempting to travel to the 1919 meeting of the council in Melbourne, the GFA's representative, T. J. Brett, was delayed by a railway strike which prevent him leaving the state. Contemporary newspapers rest much of the blame for this decision on the WAFL, suggesting that the WAFL's representative had "induced" the council to award sole control of the game in Western Australia to the coastal competition, and describing the WAFL's conduct towards the GFA as "unsportsmanlike", "vexatious" and "unfair".

=== Recent history ===
Norseman Football Club, formed from players from clubs in the Norseman Football Association, was admitted to the GNFL in 1971, playing in the league from 1971 to 1972 and again from 1974 to 1982. In 1978, five Norseman players were killed when their plane crashed on take-off.

== Western Australian State Premiership ==
The Western Australian State Premiership was contested intermittently between 1903 and 1924 between the winners of the coastal and Goldfields leagues. WAFL clubs were on the whole more successful than GFA clubs, winning 10 out of the 12 premierships contested. The Kalgoorlie Railways Football Club were the only Goldfields club to win the competition, defeating East Fremantle in 1903 and Subiaco in 1924. Mines Rovers drew with East Fremantle in the 1906 match, but lost the replay by 19 points.

== See also ==
- Australian rules football in Western Australia
- Goldfields Football League
