= John Woollard =

Australian rules footballer

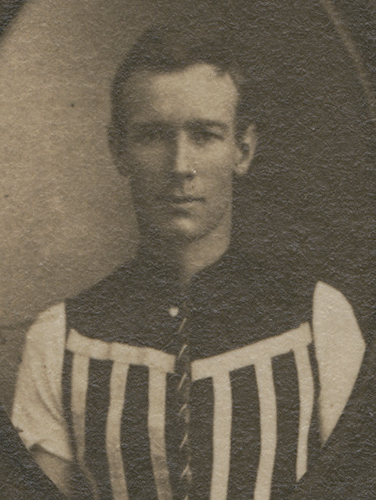

Personal information
- Nickname: Jack
- Born: 18 May 1880; Brighton, South Australia
- Died: 14 July 1965 (aged 85); Cheltenham, South Australia
- Original team: Brighton
- Position: Ruckman

Playing career
Years	Club	Games (Goals)
1898–1900	West Adelaide	28 (14)
1901, 1907	Sturt	26 (3)
1902	West Torrens	14 (3)
1903	West Perth	18 (1)
1904	Mines Rovers	≈15
1905	Kalgoorlie City	≈14
1906	East Perth	17 (4)
1908–1910	Port Adelaide	38 (11)
Total		≈170

Representative team honours
Years	Team	Games (Goals)
1901–1908	South Australia	

Career highlights
- Championship of Australia captain (1910); Port Adelaide premiership player (1910); Port Adelaide captain (1910); Inaugural Sturt player (1901); Inaugural East Perth league captain (1906)

John "Jack" Woollard (18 May 1880 – 18 July 1965) was an Australian rules footballer who played at eight clubs across the South Australian Football League, West Australian Football League and Goldfields Football League.

== Early football ==
John Woollard played his junior years at the Brighton Football Club in Adelaide.

== Senior football career (1898–1910) ==
=== Sturt (1901) ===
John Woollard made his debut with Sturt at the same time as the club made its debut in the SAFA.

=== Mines Rovers (1904) ===
During his year at Mines Rovers would lose the Gold Fields premiership to Railways by 3 points.

=== Kalgoorlie City (1905) ===
In reviewing a game between Kalgoorlie and Boulder the Kalgoorlie Miner said that "The Boulder had no man in their team to compare in point, of brilliance with Woollard".

=== East Perth (1906) ===
John Woollard was the first captain of East Perth when it was promoted to the WAFL in 1906.

=== Sturt (1907) ===
John Woollard made a return to Sturt for a season in 1907.

=== Port Adelaide (1908–1910) ===
John Woollard joined Port Adelaide in 1908. He would become captain in 1910 and lead the club to the 1910 SAFL premiership, the first of his career. In the pose season of 1910 Jack Woollard would captain the club to victories over East Fremantle, premiers of Western Australia and Collingwood, premiers of Victoria.

Woollard joined Port Adelaide on its trip to Tasmania in 1912.

== Reputation ==
When Angelo Congear was asked who was the best skipper he has played under, without hesitation he nominated Jack Woollard. "Jack", he said,"always had things well organised, and one played under his guidance with every confidence."

== See also ==
- 1908 Melbourne Carnival
