= Alby Paterson =

Australian rules footballer

Personal information
- Full name: Albert Henry Paterson
- Born: 4 March 1875; Happy Valley, Victoria
- Died: 16 April 1920 (aged 45); Trafalgar, Western Australia
- Original team: Ascot Vale

Playing career^{1}
Years	Club	Games (Goals)
1897	Carlton	1 (0)
- ^{1} Playing statistics correct to the end of 1897.

Albert Henry Paterson (4 March 1875 – 16 April 1920) was an Australian rules footballer who played for the Carlton Football Club in the Victorian Football Association (VFA) and Victorian Football League (VFL). He later moved to the Western Australian goldfields, where he played for Mines Rovers in the Goldfields Football League.

He enlisted in the Australian army in December 1916 and was transported to France to join the 3rd Australian Tunnelling Company during World War I. He contacted pneumonia on 1918 and was discharged from the army in 1919 due to being medically unfit to serve. He died from gas poisoning in April 1920.
