= West Australian State Premiership =

Defunct Australian rules football match

The West Australian State Premiership (Note: Several different names were used in contemporary sources for the matches, including "state premiership", "state championship" and "the football championship".) was an Australian rules football match contested intermittently between 1902 and 1924 between the premiers of the Western Australian Football Association and West Australian Football League (WAFA and WAFL), and the Goldfields Football Association and Goldfields Football League (GFA and GFL). (Note: The coastal league was known as the Western Australian Football Association from 1885–1907, and as the West Australian Football League (WAFL) from 1908–30. The goldfields league was known as the Goldfields Football Association (GFA) from 1901–07 and again from 1920–25, and as the Goldfields Football League (GFL) from 1908–19.)

== List of winners ==
East Fremantle won the most championships overall, winning five: 1902, 1904, 1906, 1909 and 1910:

Year	Winner	Scores		Loser	Result	Venue	Umpire	Ref
Year	Winner	Winner	Loser	Loser	Result	Venue	Umpire	Ref
1902	East Fremantle	12.16 (88)	4.5 (29)	Warriors	East Fremantle won by 59 points	Fremantle Oval	Fraser	
1903	Railways	7.6 (48)	5.11 (41)	East Fremantle	Railways won by 7 points	Kalgoorlie Recreation Reserve	F. Coffey	
1904	East Fremantle	12.15 (87)	4.9 (33)	Railways	East Fremantle won by 54 points			
1905	West Perth	8.10 (58)	4.13 (37)	Railways	West Perth won by 19 points	Kalgoorlie Recreation Reserve	S. Stivey	
1906 (replay) (Note: The 1906 match, at East Fremantle Oval, ended in a draw, with both teams locked at 47 points. The match was replayed the following weekend at the same ground, with East Fremantle winning by 19 points.)	East Fremantle	6.11 (47)	7.5 (47)	Mines Rovers	Match drawn	East Fremantle Oval	I. Crapp	
1906 (replay)	East Fremantle	7.5 (47)	3.10 (28)	Mines Rovers	East Fremantle won by 19 points	East Fremantle Oval	I. Crapp	
1907	not held							
1908	not held							
1909	East Fremantle	8.10 (58)	3.9 (27)	Boulder City	East Fremantle won by 31 points	Fremantle Oval	I. Crapp	
1910	East Fremantle	1.7 (13)	0.8 (8)	Boulder City	East Fremantle won by 5 points	Boulder Recreation Ground	C. Wellington	
1911	not held							
1912	Railways	8.12 (60)	7.9 (51)	Subiaco	Railways won by 9 points	Kalgoorlie Oval	C. Wellington	
1913	Subiaco	15.11 (101)	8.6 (54)	Boulder City	Subiaco won by 47 points	Subiaco Oval	I. Crapp	
1914	competition suspended from 1914–18 due to World War I							
1915	competition suspended from 1914–18 due to World War I							
1916	competition suspended from 1914–18 due to World War I							
1917	competition suspended from 1914–18 due to World War I							
1918	competition suspended from 1914–18 due to World War I							
1919	East Perth	9.17 (71)	6.10 (46)	Railways	East Perth won by 25 points	Kalgoorlie Oval	unknown	
1920	not held							
1921	not held							
1922	East Perth	16.15 (111)	5.4 (34)	Mines Rovers	East Perth won by 77 points	Perth Oval	unknown	
1923	East Perth	10.10 (70)	6.4 (40)	Mines Rovers	East Perth won by 30 points	Kalgoorlie Oval	F. O'Connor	
1924	Subiaco	12.12 (84)	8.13 (61)	Boulder City	Subiaco won by 23 points	East Fremantle Oval	F. O'Connor	

== See also ==
- Australian rules football in the Goldfields region of Western Australia
- Australian rules football in Western Australia
- Tasmanian State Premiership, a similar competition held in Tasmania from 1904–78
