= William Cook =

William, Will, Willie, Bill or Billy Cook may refer to:

== Sportsmen ==
=== Association football (soccer) ===
- William Cook (footballer) (1907–1968), English footballer who played for Darlington and Gateshead
- Willie Cook (footballer) (1906–1981), Scottish footballer
- Billy Cook (footballer, born 1890) (1890–1974), English-born footballer who played for Sheffield United
- Billy Cook (footballer, born 1895) (1895–1980), Huddersfield Town, Aston Villa and Tottenham Hotspur
- Billy Cook (footballer, born 1909) (1909–1992), Irish footballer who played for Celtic and Everton
- Billy Cook (footballer, born 1940) (1940–2017), Scottish-born footballer who played for Australia

=== Cricket ===
- William Cook (Lancashire cricketer) (1881–1947), English cricketer
- William Cook (Surrey cricketer) (1891–1969), English cricketer
- William Cook (Leeds/Bradford MCCU cricketer) (born 1995), English cricketer

=== Other sports ===
- William Cook (billiards player) (1849–1893), World Champion of English billiards in the 19th century
- W. T. Cook (William Thomas Cook, 1884–1970), American college sports coach
- Bill Cook (footballer, born 1887) (1887–1949), Australian rules footballer for Carlton
- Bill Cook (footballer, born 1937), Australian rules footballer for Geelong
- Bill Cook (1895–1986), Canadian ice hockey player in the Hockey Hall of Fame
- Bill Cook (American football) (c. 1904–1976), American junior college football coach
- Billy Cook (jockey) (1910–1985), Australian jockey
- Billy Cook (baseball) (born 1999), baseball player

== Politicians and judges ==
- Sir William Cook, 2nd Baronet (1630–1708), member of parliament
- William Cook (British industrialist) (1834–1908), British industrialist and politician
- William Cook (MP), member of parliament for Lewes
- William Hemmings Cook (1768–1846), Canadian fur trader and politician, member of council of Assiniboia
- William Henry Harrison Cook (1840–1923), soldier, teacher, minister and state legislator in West Virginia
- William Henry Cook (1874–1937), justice of the Supreme Court of Mississippi
- William Loch Cook (1869–1942), justice of the Tennessee Supreme Court
- Bill Cook (politician) (born 1945), Republican state senator for North Carolina

== Musicians ==
- Willie Cook (1923–2000), American jazz trumpeter
- Antony Tudor (William Cook, 1908–1987), English choreographer
- Will Marion Cook (1869–1944), American composer and violinist
- Will Joseph Cook, English singer-songwriter

== Writers and artists ==
- William Delafield Cook (1936–2015), Australian artist
- William Edwards Cook (1881–1959), American-born expatriate artist, architectural patron, and long-time friend of writer Gertrude Stein
- William Wallace Cook (1867–1933), American journalist and author
- Will Cook (writer) (William Everett Cook, 1921–1964), American writer of westerns

== Scientists ==
- William Cook (computer scientist) (1963–2021), American computer scientist
- William Harrison Cook (1903–1998), Canadian chemist
- William J. Cook (born 1957), American operations researcher and mathematician
- William Richard Joseph Cook (1905–1987), Chief Scientific Adviser to the Ministry of Defence of Great Britain 1966–1970, mathematician and civil servant
- William Cook, 19th- and early-20th-century creator of the Orpington poultry breeds

== Others ==
- William Cook (entrepreneur) (1931–2011), American medical equipment manufacturer
- William Cook (pioneer) (18th century), founder of Russellville, Kentucky
- William Douglas Cook (1884–1967), founder of Eastwoodhill Arboretum, now the national arboretum of New Zealand
- William W. Cook (1858–1930), American attorney and legal scholar
- Billy Cook (actor) (1928–1981), American actor
- Billy Cook (criminal) (1928–1952), American spree killer and mass murderer
- William Cook (1908–1987), English choreographer, better known as Antony Tudor
- William Cook Group, a British steel company and metal casting manufacturer

== See also ==
- William Cooke (disambiguation)
