= 2027 AFL season =

131st season of the Australian Football League (AFL)

2027 AFL premiership season
- Date: 17 March – 2 October 2027
- Teams: 18

The 2027 AFL season is the upcoming 131st season of the Australian Football League (AFL), the highest-level senior men's Australian rules football competition in Australia. The season will feature 18 clubs and run from 17 March to 2 October, comprising a 23-match home-and-away season followed by a five-week finals series featuring the top ten clubs.

== Coach appointments ==
New coach	Club	Date of appointment	Previous coach	Ref.
Josh Fraser	Carlton	18 August 2026	Michael Voss	
Mark McVeigh	Essendon	24 August 2026	Brad Scott	
Jaymie Graham	North Melbourne	6 October 2026	Alastair Clarkson	
Cameron Bruce	Brisbane Lions	9 November 2026	Chris Fagan	

== Club leadership ==
Club	Coach	Leadership group			
Club	Coach	Captain(s)	Vice-captain(s)	Other leader(s)	Ref.
Adelaide	Matthew Nicks				
Brisbane Lions					
Carlton					
Collingwood					
Essendon	Mark McVeigh				
Fremantle	Justin Longmuir				
Geelong					
Gold Coast	Damien Hardwick				
Greater Western Sydney	Adam Kingsley				
Hawthorn					
Melbourne					
North Melbourne					
Port Adelaide					
Richmond	Adem Yze				
St Kilda					
Sydney	Dean Cox				
West Coast					
Western Bulldogs					

== Pre-season ==
Starting time is local time. Source: afl.com.au

2027 AFL Origin
Saturday, 27 February (4:40 pm)	Western Australia	v	South Australia	Optus Stadium
Q1; Q2; Q3; Q4

== Home-and-away season ==
All starting times are local time. Source: afl.com.au

=== Round 1 ===
	Round 1
Wednesday, 17 March (7:30 pm)	Sydney	v	Geelong	Sydney Cricket Ground
Thursday, 18 March (5:10 pm)	Fremantle	v	Western Bulldogs	Optus Stadium
Friday, 19 March (7:50 pm)	Hawthorn	v	Brisbane Lions	Melbourne Cricket Ground
Saturday, 20 March (12:35 pm)	Richmond	v	Carlton	Melbourne Cricket Ground
Saturday, 20 March (3:45 pm)	Adelaide	v	Greater Western Sydney	Adelaide Oval
Saturday, 20 March (7:40 pm)	St Kilda	v	Collingwood	Melbourne Cricket Ground
Sunday, 21 March (1:10 pm)	North Melbourne	v	Port Adelaide	Marvel Stadium
Sunday, 21 March (3:15 pm)	Melbourne	v	Essendon	Melbourne Cricket Ground
Sunday, 21 March (3:10 pm)	West Coast	v	Gold Coast	Optus Stadium

=== Round 2 ===
	Round 2
Thursday, 25 March (6:50 pm)	Brisbane Lions	v	Collingwood	The Gabba
Friday, 26 March (3:15 pm)	North Melbourne	v	Carlton	Marvel Stadium
Friday, 26 March (4:15 pm)	Fremantle	v	Adelaide	Optus Stadium
Saturday, 27 March (2:10 pm)	Greater Western Sydney	v	West Coast	Corroboree Group Oval
Saturday, 27 March (4:10 pm)	Gold Coast	v	Richmond	People First Stadium
Saturday, 27 March (7:40 pm)	Port Adelaide	v	Melbourne	Adelaide Oval
Sunday, 28 March (3:15 pm)	Essendon	v	Sydney	Melbourne Cricket Ground
Sunday, 28 March (7:20 pm)	Western Bulldogs	v	St Kilda	Marvel Stadium
Monday, 29 March (3:15 pm)	Geelong	v	Hawthorn	Melbourne Cricket Ground

=== Round 3 ===
	Round 3
Thursday, 1 April (7:30 pm)	Collingwood	v	Fremantle	Melbourne Cricket Ground
Friday, 2 April (7:10 pm)	Sydney	v	Greater Western Sydney	Sydney Cricket Ground
Friday, 2 April (7:10 pm)	Carlton	v	Brisbane Lions	Marvel Stadium
Saturday, 3 April (1:35 pm)	St Kilda	v	Melbourne	Marvel Stadium
Saturday, 3 April (4:05 pm)	Adelaide	v	Western Bulldogs	Adelaide Oval
Saturday, 3 April (7:45 pm)	Hawthorn	v	Essendon	Melbourne Cricket Ground
Sunday, 4 April (12:30 pm)	Geelong	v	Richmond	GMHBA Stadium
Sunday, 4 April (3:15 pm)	Gold Coast	v	North Melbourne	People First Stadium
Sunday, 4 April (4:10 pm)	West Coast	v	Port Adelaide	Optus Stadium

=== Round 4 ===
	Round 4 (Gather Round)
Thursday, 8 April (7:10 pm)	Adelaide	v	Brisbane Lions	Adelaide Oval
Friday, 9 April (7:10 pm)	Sydney	v	Collingwood	Adelaide Oval
Saturday, 10 April (12:05 pm)	Gold Coast	v	Greater Western Sydney	Barossa Park
Saturday, 10 April (1:05 pm)	Carlton	v	Melbourne	Adelaide Oval
Saturday, 10 April (4:05 pm)	Richmond	v	West Coast	Norwood Oval
Saturday, 10 April (7:15 pm)	Fremantle	v	Hawthorn	Adelaide Oval
Sunday, 11 April (12:00 pm)	Essendon	v	North Melbourne	Barossa Park
Sunday, 11 April (2:45 pm)	St Kilda	v	Geelong	Norwood Oval
Sunday, 11 April (6:45 pm)	Port Adelaide	v	Western Bulldogs	Adelaide Oval

=== Round 5 ===
	Round 5
Thursday, 15 April (7:30 pm)	Carlton	v	Collingwood	Melbourne Cricket Ground
Friday, 16 April (7:40 pm)	Melbourne	v	Sydney	Melbourne Cricket Ground
Friday, 16 April (6:10 pm)	Fremantle	v	West Coast	Optus Stadium
Saturday, 17 April (12:45 pm)	Adelaide	v	Gold Coast	Adelaide Oval
Saturday, 17 April (4:15 pm)	Richmond	v	North Melbourne	Melbourne Cricket Ground
Saturday, 17 April (7:35 pm)	Western Bulldogs	v	Hawthorn	Marvel Stadium
Sunday, 18 April (12:30 pm)	Essendon	v	Geelong	Melbourne Cricket Ground
Sunday, 18 April (3:15 pm)	St Kilda	v	Port Adelaide	Marvel Stadium
Sunday, 18 April (6:10 pm)	Brisbane Lions	v	Greater Western Sydney	The Gabba

=== Round 6 ===
	Round 6 (Anzac Appeal Round)
Thursday, 22 April (7:30 pm)	Gold Coast	v	Hawthorn	People First Stadium
Friday, 23 April (7:40 pm)	Sydney	v	Adelaide	Sydney Cricket Ground
Saturday, 24 April (1:15 pm)	Brisbane Lions	v	West Coast	The Gabba
Saturday, 24 April (4:15 pm)	Geelong	v	North Melbourne	GMHBA Stadium
Saturday, 24 April (7:40 pm)	Melbourne	v	Richmond	Melbourne Cricket Ground
Saturday, 24 April (7:40 pm)	Port Adelaide	v	Carlton	Adelaide Oval
Sunday, 25 April (12:15 pm)	Greater Western Sydney	v	Western Bulldogs	Corroboree Group Oval
Sunday, 25 April (3:15 pm)	Collingwood	v	Essendon	Melbourne Cricket Ground
Sunday, 25 April (6:15 pm)	Fremantle	v	St Kilda	Optus Stadium

=== Round 7 ===
	Round 7
Thursday, 29 April (7:30 pm)	Brisbane Lions	v	Sydney	The Gabba
Friday, 30 April (7:40 pm)	Hawthorn	v	Carlton	Melbourne Cricket Ground
Saturday, 1 May (12:45 pm)	Melbourne	v	Adelaide	TIO Traeger Park
Saturday, 1 May (4:15 pm)	Essendon	v	Fremantle	Marvel Stadium
Saturday, 1 May (4:35 pm)	Greater Western Sydney	v	Geelong	Engie Stadium
Saturday, 1 May (5:35 pm)	West Coast	v	Collingwood	Optus Stadium
Sunday, 2 May (12:30 pm)	Western Bulldogs	v	Gold Coast	Mars Stadium
Sunday, 2 May (3:15 pm)	Richmond	v	Port Adelaide	Ninja Stadium
Sunday, 2 May (6:10 pm)	North Melbourne	v	St Kilda	Marvel Stadium

=== Round 8 ===
	Round 8
Thursday, 6 May (7:30 pm)	Carlton	v	Geelong	Melbourne Cricket Ground
Friday, 7 May (7:40 pm)	Collingwood	v	Western Bulldogs	Marvel Stadium
Friday, 7 May (7:40 pm)	Port Adelaide	v	Adelaide	Adelaide Oval
Saturday, 8 May (1:15 pm)	Gold Coast	v	Essendon	People First Stadium
Saturday, 8 May (4:15 pm)	St Kilda	v	Richmond	Marvel Stadium
Saturday, 8 May (7:35 pm)	Sydney	v	North Melbourne	Sydney Cricket Ground
Sunday, 9 May (12:30 pm)	Hawthorn	v	Greater Western Sydney	University of Tasmania Stadium
Sunday, 9 May (3:15 pm)	Melbourne	v	West Coast	Melbourne Cricket Ground
Sunday, 9 May (5:20 pm)	Fremantle	v	Brisbane Lions	Optus Stadium

=== Round 9 ===
	Round 9 (Sir Doug Nicholls Round week 1)
Thursday, 13 May (7:30 pm)	Adelaide	v	Geelong	Adelaide Oval
Friday, 14 May (7:45 pm)	Richmond	v	Essendon	Melbourne Cricket Ground
Saturday, 15 May (1:15 pm)	Greater Western Sydney	v	Fremantle	Engie Stadium
Saturday, 15 May (1:45 pm)	Melbourne	v	Gold Coast	Melbourne Cricket Ground
Saturday, 15 May (2:15 pm)	West Coast	v	Sydney	Optus Stadium
Saturday, 15 May (7:35 pm)	Hawthorn	v	Port Adelaide	Marvel Stadium
Sunday, 16 May (12:30 pm)	Brisbane Lions	v	St Kilda	The Gabba
Sunday, 16 May (3:15 pm)	Carlton	v	Western Bulldogs	Melbourne Cricket Ground
Sunday, 16 May (6:10 pm)	North Melbourne	v	Collingwood	Marvel Stadium

=== Round 10 ===
	Round 10 (Sir Doug Nicholls Round week 2)
Thursday, 20 May (6:10 pm)	Fremantle	v	Melbourne	Optus Stadium
Friday, 21 May (7:40 pm)	Sydney	v	Hawthorn	Sydney Cricket Ground
Saturday, 22 May (12:45 pm)	Port Adelaide	v	Brisbane Lions	Adelaide Oval
Saturday, 22 May (4:15 pm)	Geelong	v	West Coast	GMHBA Stadium
Saturday, 22 May (4:35 pm)	Western Bulldogs	v	North Melbourne	Marvel Stadium
Saturday, 22 May (7:35 pm)	Collingwood	v	Richmond	Melbourne Cricket Ground
Sunday, 23 May (12:30 pm)	St Kilda	v	Greater Western Sydney	Marvel Stadium
Sunday, 23 May (3:15 pm)	Essendon	v	Adelaide	Melbourne Cricket Ground
Sunday, 23 May (5:40 pm)	Gold Coast	v	Carlton	TIO Stadium

=== Round 11 ===
	Round 11
Thursday, 27 May (7:30 pm)	Western Bulldogs	v	Sydney	Marvel Stadium
Friday, 28 May (7:40 pm)	Geelong	v	Melbourne	GMHBA Stadium
Saturday, 29 May (1:15 pm)	Hawthorn	v	St Kilda	University of Tasmania Stadium
Saturday, 29 May (4:15 pm)	Greater Western Sydney	v	Essendon	Engie Stadium
Saturday, 29 May (7:05 pm)	Port Adelaide	v	Collingwood	Adelaide Oval
Sunday, 30 May (1:15 pm)	North Melbourne	v	West Coast	Hands Oval
Sunday, 30 May (6:10 pm)	Carlton	v	Fremantle	Marvel Stadium
	Bye: Adelaide; Brisbane Lions; Gold Coast; Richmond

=== Round 12 ===
	Round 12
Thursday, 3 June (7:30 pm)	Western Bulldogs	v	Melbourne	Marvel Stadium
Friday, 4 June (7:40 pm)	Collingwood	v	Hawthorn	Melbourne Cricket Ground
Saturday, 5 June (1:35 pm)	Richmond	v	Adelaide	Melbourne Cricket Ground
Saturday, 5 June (4:35 pm)	Brisbane Lions	v	Gold Coast	The Gabba
Saturday, 5 June (5:35 pm)	North Melbourne	v	Fremantle	Optus Stadium
Sunday, 6 June (3:15 pm)	Essendon	v	St Kilda	Marvel Stadium
Sunday, 6 June (6:10 pm)	West Coast	v	Carlton	Optus Stadium
	Bye: Geelong; Greater Western Sydney; Port Adelaide; Sydney

=== Round 13 ===
	Round 13
Thursday, 10 June (7:00 pm)	Adelaide	v	Hawthorn	Adelaide Oval
Friday, 11 June (7:40 pm)	Geelong	v	Brisbane Lions	GMHBA Stadium
Saturday, 12 June (1:15 pm)	Gold Coast	v	Port Adelaide	People First Stadium
Saturday, 12 June (4:15 pm)	Richmond	v	Greater Western Sydney	Marvel Stadium
Saturday, 12 June (5:35 pm)	West Coast	v	Western Bulldogs	Optus Stadium
Sunday, 13 June (3:15 pm)	Sydney	v	St Kilda	Sydney Cricket Ground
Sunday, 13 June (7:20 pm)	Carlton	v	Essendon	Melbourne Cricket Ground
Monday, 14 June (3:15 pm)	Melbourne	v	Collingwood	Melbourne Cricket Ground
	Bye: Fremantle; North Melbourne

=== Round 14 ===
	Round 14
Thursday, 17 June (7:30 pm)	Hawthorn	v	Fremantle	Melbourne Cricket Ground
Friday, 18 June (7:40 pm)	Western Bulldogs	v	Geelong	Marvel Stadium
Saturday, 19 June (1:05 pm)	Port Adelaide	v	Sydney	Adelaide Oval
Saturday, 19 June (4:35 pm)	Brisbane Lions	v	Richmond	The Gabba
Saturday, 19 June (7:35 pm)	Essendon	v	North Melbourne	Marvel Stadium
Sunday, 20 June (2:45 pm)	Adelaide	v	Melbourne	Adelaide Oval
Sunday, 20 June (5:10 pm)	Greater Western Sydney	v	Gold Coast	Engie Stadium
	Bye: Carlton; Collingwood; St Kilda; West Coast

=== Round 15 ===
	Round 15
Thursday, 24 June (6:10 pm)	Fremantle	v	Geelong	Optus Stadium
Friday, 25 June (7:40 pm)	Sydney	v	Brisbane Lions	Sydney Cricket Ground
Saturday, 26 June (1:15 pm)	Richmond	v	West Coast	Melbourne Cricket Ground
Saturday, 26 June (3:45 pm)	Adelaide	v	North Melbourne	Adelaide Oval
Saturday, 26 June (7:35 pm)	Gold Coast	v	Collingwood	People First Stadium
Sunday, 27 June (3:15 pm)	St Kilda	v	Carlton	Marvel Stadium
Sunday, 27 June (5:10 pm)	Greater Western Sydney	v	Port Adelaide	Corroboree Group Oval
	Bye: Essendon; Hawthorn; Melbourne; Western Bulldogs

=== Round 16 ===
	Round 16
Thursday, 1 July (7:30 pm)	Brisbane Lions	v	Fremantle	The Gabba
Friday, 2 July (7:40 pm)	Sydney	v	Melbourne	Sydney Cricket Ground
Friday, 2 July (6:10 pm)	West Coast	v	Adelaide	Optus Stadium
Saturday, 3 July (1:05 pm)	Port Adelaide	v	Hawthorn	Adelaide Oval
Saturday, 3 July (4:15 pm)	Geelong	v	Gold Coast	GMHBA Stadium
Saturday, 3 July (4:35 pm)	Collingwood	v	Greater Western Sydney	Melbourne Cricket Ground
Saturday, 3 July (7:35 pm)	Carlton	v	North Melbourne	Marvel Stadium
Sunday, 4 July (1:15 pm)	Essendon	v	Richmond	Optus Stadium
Sunday, 4 July (5:10 pm)	St Kilda	v	Western Bulldogs	Marvel Stadium

=== Round 17 ===
	Round 17
Dates and times TBC	Adelaide	v	St Kilda	Adelaide Oval
	Collingwood	v	Brisbane Lions	Melbourne Cricket Ground
	Fremantle	v	Richmond	Optus Stadium
	Gold Coast	v	Western Bulldogs	People First Stadium
	Greater Western Sydney	v	Carlton	Engie Stadium
	Hawthorn	v	Geelong	Melbourne Cricket Ground
	Melbourne	v	Port Adelaide	Marvel Stadium
	North Melbourne	v	Sydney	Marvel Stadium
	West Coast	v	Essendon	Optus Stadium

=== Round 18 ===
	Round 18
Dates and times TBC	Brisbane Lions	v	North Melbourne	The Gabba
	Carlton	v	Melbourne	Melbourne Cricket Ground
	Collingwood	v	Geelong	Melbourne Cricket Ground
	Essendon	v	Greater Western Sydney	Marvel Stadium
	Hawthorn	v	Gold Coast	University of Tasmania Stadium
	Port Adelaide	v	Fremantle	Adelaide Oval
	Richmond	v	St Kilda	Melbourne Cricket Ground
	Sydney	v	West Coast	Sydney Cricket Ground
	Western Bulldogs	v	Adelaide	Marvel Stadium

=== Round 19 ===
	Round 19
Dates and times TBC	Adelaide	v	Port Adelaide	Adelaide Oval
	Essendon	v	Collingwood	Melbourne Cricket Ground
	Geelong	v	Carlton	GMHBA Stadium
	Gold Coast	v	St Kilda	People First Stadium
	Greater Western Sydney	v	Melbourne	Engie Stadium
	North Melbourne	v	Hawthorn	Marvel Stadium
	Richmond	v	Sydney	Melbourne Cricket Ground
	West Coast	v	Fremantle	Optus Stadium
	Western Bulldogs	v	Brisbane Lions	Marvel Stadium

=== Round 20 ===
	Round 20
Dates and times TBC	Brisbane Lions	v	Essendon	The Gabba
	Carlton	v	Adelaide	Marvel Stadium
	Fremantle	v	Collingwood	Optus Stadium
	Melbourne	v	Hawthorn	Melbourne Cricket Ground
	North Melbourne	v	Richmond	Marvel Stadium
	Port Adelaide	v	West Coast	Adelaide Oval
	St Kilda	v	Geelong	Marvel Stadium
	Sydney	v	Gold Coast	Sydney Cricket Ground
	Western Bulldogs	v	Greater Western Sydney	Mars Stadium

=== Round 21 ===
	Round 21
Dates and times TBC	Adelaide	v	Richmond	Adelaide Oval
	Collingwood	v	Carlton	Melbourne Cricket Ground
	Essendon	v	Western Bulldogs	Marvel Stadium
	Geelong	v	Port Adelaide	GMHBA Stadium
	Gold Coast	v	Fremantle	People First Stadium
	Greater Western Sydney	v	North Melbourne	Engie Stadium
	Hawthorn	v	Sydney	University of Tasmania Stadium
	St Kilda	v	Brisbane Lions	Marvel Stadium
	West Coast	v	Melbourne	Optus Stadium

=== Round 22 ===
	Round 22
Dates and times TBC	Brisbane Lions	v	Geelong	The Gabba
	Collingwood	v	Adelaide	Melbourne Cricket Ground
	Fremantle	v	Greater Western Sydney	Optus Stadium
	Melbourne	v	Western Bulldogs	Melbourne Cricket Ground
	North Melbourne	v	Gold Coast	Marvel Stadium
	Port Adelaide	v	Essendon	Adelaide Oval
	Richmond	v	Hawthorn	Melbourne Cricket Ground
	St Kilda	v	West Coast	Marvel Stadium
	Sydney	v	Carlton	Sydney Cricket Ground

=== Round 23 ===
	Round 23
Dates and times TBC	Adelaide	v	Fremantle	Adelaide Oval
	Carlton	v	Port Adelaide	Melbourne Cricket Ground
	Collingwood	v	St Kilda	Marvel Stadium
	Geelong	v	Essendon	GMHBA Stadium
	Gold Coast	v	Brisbane Lions	People First Stadium
	Greater Western Sydney	v	Sydney	Engie Stadium
	North Melbourne	v	Melbourne	Marvel Stadium
	West Coast	v	Hawthorn	Optus Stadium
	Western Bulldogs	v	Richmond	Marvel Stadium

=== Round 24 ===
	Round 24
Dates and times TBC	Carlton	v	Greater Western Sydney	Marvel Stadium
	Essendon	v	West Coast	Marvel Stadium
	Fremantle	v	Sydney	Optus Stadium
	Geelong	v	Adelaide	GMHBA Stadium
	Hawthorn	v	Western Bulldogs	Melbourne Cricket Ground
	Melbourne	v	Brisbane Lions	Melbourne Cricket Ground
	Port Adelaide	v	Gold Coast	Adelaide Oval
	Richmond	v	Collingwood	Melbourne Cricket Ground
	St Kilda	v	North Melbourne	Marvel Stadium

== Ladder ==
Pos	Team	Pld	W	L	D	PF	PA	PP	Pts	Qualification
1	Adelaide	0	0	0	0	0	0	—	0	Finals series
2	Brisbane Lions	0	0	0	0	0	0	—	0	Finals series
3	Carlton	0	0	0	0	0	0	—	0	Finals series
4	Collingwood	0	0	0	0	0	0	—	0	Finals series
5	Essendon	0	0	0	0	0	0	—	0	Finals series
6	Fremantle	0	0	0	0	0	0	—	0	Finals series
7	Geelong	0	0	0	0	0	0	—	0	Finals series
8	Gold Coast	0	0	0	0	0	0	—	0	Finals series
9	Greater Western Sydney	0	0	0	0	0	0	—	0	Finals series
10	Hawthorn	0	0	0	0	0	0	—	0	Finals series
11	Melbourne	0	0	0	0	0	0	—	0	
12	North Melbourne	0	0	0	0	0	0	—	0	
13	Port Adelaide	0	0	0	0	0	0	—	0	
14	Richmond	0	0	0	0	0	0	—	0	
15	St Kilda	0	0	0	0	0	0	—	0	
16	Sydney	0	0	0	0	0	0	—	0	
17	West Coast	0	0	0	0	0	0	—	0	
18	Western Bulldogs	0	0	0	0	0	0	—	0	

Source: afl.com.au
Rules for classification: 1) points; 2) percentage; 3) number of points for

== Progression by round ==
Team	1	2	3	4	5	6	7	8	9	10	11	12	13	14	15	16	17	18	19	20	21	22	23	24
Adelaide																								
Brisbane Lions																								
Carlton																								
Collingwood																								
Essendon																								
Fremantle																								
Geelong																								
Gold Coast																								
Greater Western Sydney																								
Hawthorn																								
Melbourne																								
North Melbourne																								
Port Adelaide																								
Richmond																								
St Kilda																								
Sydney																								
West Coast																								
Western Bulldogs																								

== Win–loss table ==
Team	Home-and-away season																								Ladder	Finals series				
Team	1	2	3	4	5	6	7	8	9	10	11	12	13	14	15	16	17	18	19	20	21	22	23	24	Ladder	F1	F2	F3	F4	GF
Adelaide	GWS	FRE	WB	BL	GC	SYD	MEL	PA	GEE	ESS	X	RIC	HAW	MEL	NM	WC	STK	WB	PA	CAR	RIC	COL	FRE	GEE	1 (0–0–0)					
Brisbane Lions	HAW	COL	CAR	ADE	GWS	WC	SYD	FRE	STK	PA	X	GC	GEE	RIC	SYD	FRE	COL	NM	WB	ESS	STK	GEE	GC	MEL	2 (0–0–0)					
Carlton	RIC	NM	BL	MEL	COL	PA	HAW	GEE	WB	GC	FRE	WC	ESS	X	STK	NM	GWS	MEL	GEE	ADE	COL	SYD	PA	GWS	3 (0–0–0)					
Collingwood	STK	BL	FRE	SYD	CAR	ESS	WC	WB	NM	RIC	PA	HAW	MEL	X	GC	GWS	BL	GEE	ESS	FRE	CAR	ADE	STK	RIC	4 (0–0–0)					
Essendon	MEL	SYD	HAW	NM	GEE	COL	FRE	GC	RIC	ADE	GWS	STK	CAR	NM	X	RIC	WC	GWS	COL	BL	WB	PA	GEE	WC	5 (0–0–0)					
Fremantle	WB	ADE	COL	HAW	WC	STK	ESS	BL	GWS	MEL	CAR	NM	X	HAW	GEE	BL	RIC	PA	WC	COL	GC	GWS	ADE	SYD	6 (0–0–0)					
Geelong	SYD	HAW	RIC	STK	ESS	NM	GWS	CAR	ADE	WC	MEL	X	BL	WB	FRE	GC	HAW	COL	CAR	STK	PA	BL	ESS	ADE	7 (0–0–0)					
Gold Coast	WC	RIC	NM	GWS	ADE	HAW	WB	ESS	MEL	CAR	X	BL	PA	GWS	COL	GEE	WB	HAW	STK	SYD	FRE	NM	BL	PA	8 (0–0–0)					
Greater Western Sydney	ADE	WC	SYD	GC	BL	WB	GEE	HAW	FRE	STK	ESS	X	RIC	GC	PA	COL	CAR	ESS	MEL	WB	NM	FRE	SYD	CAR	9 (0–0–0)					
Hawthorn	BL	GEE	ESS	FRE	WB	GC	CAR	GWS	PA	SYD	STK	COL	ADE	FRE	X	PA	GEE	GC	NM	MEL	SYD	RIC	WC	WB	10 (0–0–0)					
Melbourne	ESS	PA	STK	CAR	SYD	RIC	ADE	WC	GC	FRE	GEE	WB	COL	ADE	X	SYD	PA	CAR	GWS	HAW	WC	WB	NM	BL	11 (0–0–0)					
North Melbourne	PA	CAR	GC	ESS	RIC	GEE	STK	SYD	COL	WB	WC	FRE	X	ESS	ADE	CAR	SYD	BL	HAW	RIC	GWS	GC	MEL	STK	12 (0–0–0)					
Port Adelaide	NM	MEL	WC	WB	STK	CAR	RIC	ADE	HAW	BL	COL	X	GC	SYD	GWS	HAW	MEL	FRE	ADE	WC	GEE	ESS	CAR	GC	13 (0–0–0)					
Richmond	CAR	GC	GEE	WC	NM	MEL	PA	STK	ESS	COL	X	ADE	GWS	BL	WC	ESS	FRE	STK	SYD	NM	ADE	HAW	WB	COL	14 (0–0–0)					
St Kilda	COL	WB	MEL	GEE	PA	FRE	NM	RIC	BL	GWS	HAW	ESS	SYD	X	CAR	WB	ADE	RIC	GC	GEE	BL	WC	COL	NM	15 (0–0–0)					
Sydney	GEE	ESS	GWS	COL	MEL	ADE	BL	NM	WC	HAW	WB	X	STK	PA	BL	MEL	NM	WC	RIC	GC	HAW	CAR	GWS	FRE	16 (0–0–0)					
West Coast	GC	GWS	PA	RIC	FRE	BL	COL	MEL	SYD	GEE	NM	CAR	WB	X	RIC	ADE	ESS	SYD	FRE	PA	MEL	STK	HAW	ESS	17 (0–0–0)					
Western Bulldogs	FRE	STK	ADE	PA	HAW	GWS	GC	COL	CAR	NM	SYD	MEL	WC	GEE	X	STK	GC	ADE	BL	GWS	ESS	MEL	RIC	HAW	18 (0–0–0)					

Source: AFL Tables

== See also ==
- 2027 AFL Women's season
