= Sir Richard Moore Oval =

Sports venue in Kalgoorlie, Western Australia

Coordinates: 30°44′34″S 121°28′06″E

Sir Richard Moore Oval, also known as Kalgoorlie Oval, is a sports venue in Kalgoorlie, Western Australia used primarily for Australian rules football. The ground formerly hosted cricket. The ground has hosted several West Australian State Premiership matches.
