= Alec Epis =

Australian rules footballer

Personal information
- Full name: Alessandro Angelo Epis
- Nickname: Kookaburra
- Born: 27 August 1937 (age 89)
- Original team: Mines Rovers (GNFL)
- Height: 187 cm (6 ft 2 in)
- Weight: 88 kg (194 lb)

Playing career^{1}
Years	Club	Games (Goals)
1958–1968	Essendon	180 (2)

Representative team honours
Years	Team	Games (Goals)
	Victoria	4
- ^{1} Playing statistics correct to the end of 1968.

Career highlights
- Essendon premiership player 1962, 1965; Italian Team of the Century

Alessandro Angelo Epis (born 27 August 1937) is a former Australian rules footballer who represented Essendon in the Victorian Football League (VFL) during the 1950s and 1960s.

== Early life and career ==
Epis was born and raised in the Western Australian goldfields town of Boulder. He had a sister, Ena. Both his father, Virgilio, and mother, Giusefina (née Borlini), hailed from the Province of Bergamo in northern Italy.

Epis made his name as a promising player in the Goldfields National Football League (GNFL) with the Mines Rovers club, winning the Fletcher Medal in 1955. He sought a clearance to Essendon but was refused. Epis played on the half-back flank and on the wing. When he arrived at Essendon he worked as a butcher. He was a part of two premiership teams with the Bombers.

== After Playing ==
In 1972, Epis set up his own cleaning service. It was taken over by James Aforozis, but Epis has continued as a consultant to the business. He also owns the 'Epis' and 'Epis and Williams' wineries and vineyards.
