= Gordon Maffina =

Australian rules footballer and coach

Personal information
- Full name: Gordon Louis Charles Maffina
- Born: 10 January 1926; Boulder, Western Australia
- Died: 10 September 1991 (aged 65); Nedlands, Western Australia
- Original team: Boulder City

Playing career^{1}
Years	Club	Games (Goals)
1948–1958	Claremont	114 (29)
- ^{1} Playing statistics correct to the end of 1958.

Gordon Louis Charles 'Sonny' Maffina (10 January 1926 – 10 September 1991) was an Australian rules footballer who played 114 games for Claremont in the West Australian National Football League (WANFL) from 1948 to 1958.

Centreman Gordon Maffina, nicknamed Sonny, arrived at Claremont from Goldfields National Football League club Boulder City. He made an immediate impact at Claremont with a Sandover Medal win in 1949 as well as being awarded his club's Best and fairest.

He represented Western Australia at the 1950 Brisbane Carnival where he was a Simpson Medalilst and appeared in a total of eight interstates matches for his state.

Appointed captain-coach of Claremont in 1952 after captaining them the previous year, Maffina remained in the role until the end of the 1953 season. He continued on as a player, returning briefly as captain-coach in 1957, but suffered from niggling injuries towards the end of his career and retired in 1958. When Claremont took out the 1964 premiership he was the assistant coach.
