= Ivo Crapp =

Australian rules football umpire (1872–1924)

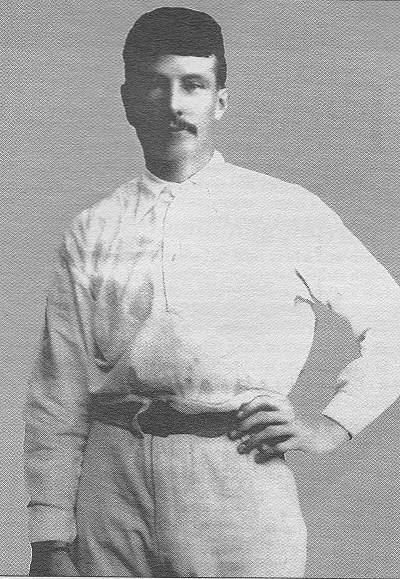
- Ivo Crapp during his umpiring career

Personal information
- Full name: Henry Crapp
- Born: 1872; Melbourne, Victoria
- Died: 20 January 1924 (aged 51–52); West Perth, Western Australia
- Height: 185 cm (6 ft 1 in)

Playing career
Years	Club	Games (Goals)	
1893	Carlton (VFA)	4 (0)	

Umpiring career
Years	League	Role	Games
1895–1896	VFA	Field umpire	28
1897–1905	VFL	Field umpire	148
1906–1919	WAFL	Field umpire	177

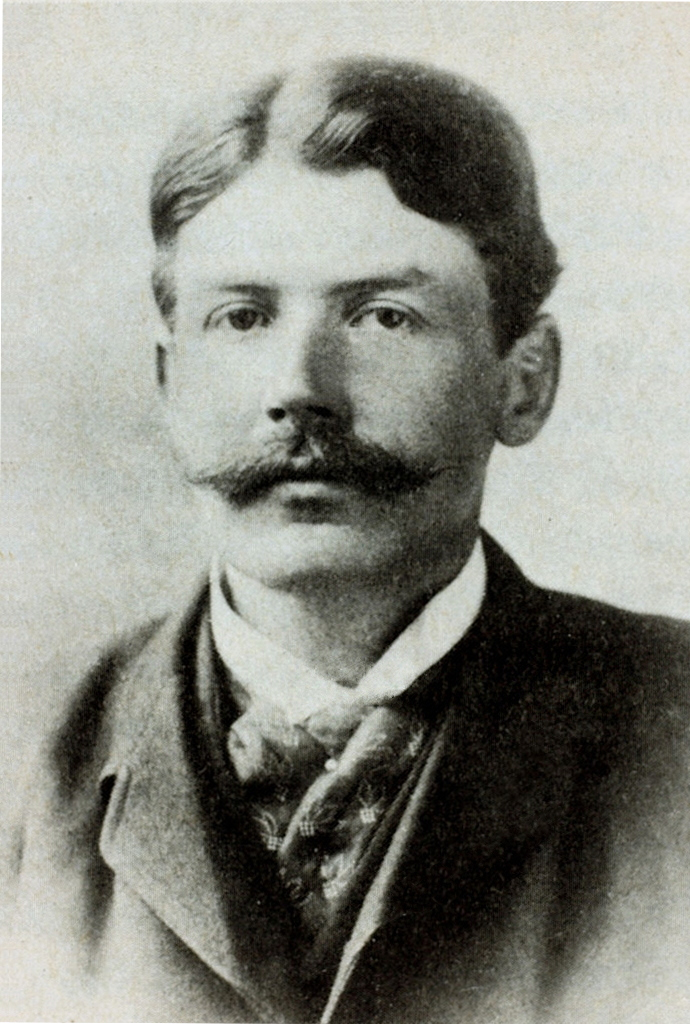
English Test team captain Ivo Bligh (c.1883)

Henry "Harry" Crapp (1872 – 20 January 1924), commonly known as Ivo Crapp, was a leading Australian rules football field umpire in the Victorian Football League (VFL) at its formation in the 1890s, and with the West Australian Football League across the late 1900s and early 1910s.

Known as the VFL's "Prince of Umpires" "in the capacity of central umpire he attained a degree of skill which set him apart in his career, he was recognized as one without peer in the history of the Australian game" he umpired the first ever match in that league.

== Early life ==
The son of Henry Crapp, and Emma Crapp (née Snell), Henry "Harry" Crapp was born in Victoria in 1872. He married Priscilla "Prissie" Hulley (1875–1949) in 1895. They had three children, Edward, Thomas, and May (later, Mrs. D.N. Clair).

Harry's brother, William Henry Crapp, was known as "Ivo" due to his close facial resemblance to Ivo Bligh, 8th Earl of Darnley who had visited Australia in 1882/1883 as the captain of the first-ever English cricket team to play an Ashes series in Australia. Once William retired from football, Harry also became known far and wide as "Ivo", inheriting his brother's nickname.

== Playing career ==
Crapp played just four games for Carlton in the VFA during the 1893 season before taking up umpiring. His older brother, William, who played at full-back and "was a beautiful kick for goal", also played with Carlton in the VFA at the same time.

== Umpiring career ==
=== Victoria ===
Crapp started his umpiring career in the Victorian Football Association in 1895. When the newly formed Victorian Football League commenced in 1897, he was appointed to the first match at Corio Oval between Geelong and Essendon.

As the field umpire in the 18 June 1898 match between Carlton and St Kilda, at Princes Park, he reported St Kilda's Bill Matthews for abusive language: this was the first, and only report in the first two VFL seasons. He was also the field umpire in the VFL's first-ever Grand Final, between Fitzroy and Essendon, on 24 September 1898.

Crapp was well regarded by the footballers; no doubt his height, at 6"1', also gave him some authority. He was considered to be a very competent umpire, and well able to discern a "stage" for a free kick. He was also proud of the (then unusual) ability to refer to all players by their names during the course of a match. In 1901, Crapp began the practice of calling the reasons for free kicks and nominating who was to take the kick by name. This innovation was soon generally adopted by all of the umpires.

Crapp umpired at a time when the field umpire had to not only control the field play, but also return the ball into play once out of bounds (boundary umpires commenced in 1904). Furthermore, until 1922, the field umpire also had to return the ball to the centre following the scoring of a goal. Luckily, the overall pace of games was much slower than in the more modern eras, and Crapp maintained a relatively high standard of fitness.

By 1905, his record stood at 176 matches – 148 of them in the VFL – including 17 finals and 7 grand finals (1898–1902 and 1904–1905). In addition, he had umpired interstate football matches in 1899, 1902 and 1905.

=== Western Australia ===
In 1906, Crapp was enticed to move to Kalgoorlie, Western Australia on the promise of employment and a contract from the Goldfields Football Association. Crapp found that no job existed for him, the proposed employment having fallen through, and departed by train to Perth, intending to return to Melbourne. West Australian Football Association (WAFA) officials, however, managed to intercept Crapp and convince him to umpire the first round in their Perth-based competition.

The Association quickly offered him a contract having seen the quality of his umpiring. He was as outstanding in the WAFA as he had been in the VFL, and he was appointed to the 1906 finals series and the grand final. Crapp became the first-choice umpire in the newly-named West Australian Football League (WAFL) and he umpired every final until 1914 – a total of 30 in all. Crapp also umpired four West Australian State Premiership matches; in 1906, 1909 and 1913.

In 1914, Crapp travelled to Sydney as the Western Australian representative umpire at the Australian National Football Council Carnival. In the WAFL, Crapp umpired 177 games before his retirement in 1919, for a career total of 353 games. His last major appointment, by request of the VFL, was to the 1921 interstate match between Western Australia and Victoria, when he was aged 48.

Crapp's 17 grand finals as a field umpire in the VFL and WAFL remains the elite Australian rules football record as of 2026, and is exceedingly unlikely to ever be beaten.

His total of 353 career matches as a field umpire remained the elite Australian rules football record until it was broken by VFL/AFL umpire Rowan Sawers in 1995, while his 47 finals matches remained the record until broken by WAFL and AFL umpire Brett Rosebury in 2015, and his 25 seasons as a field umpire remained the record until AFL umpire Shane McInerney officiated his 26th (and final) season in 2019.

== Coaching career ==
Some sources assert that Crapp coached East Perth in 1909; however, this seems unlikely. Records indicate that he also umpired every week that season, including a final in which East Perth played. Therefore, Crapp may have been active in some other capacity with the club, given that Ben Wallish, the team's captain, was also their coach.

Similarly, although Subiaco's honour roll clearly states that its 1910 captain-coach was Jack Diprose, an April 1910 press report described how "Ivor [sic] Crapp is coaching the Subiaco 18 this season"; and so it may be that Crapp, from time to time, took on various advisory duties with various WAFL teams.

== Death ==
Crapp died at his home in West Perth, Western Australia, on 20 January 1924.

== Honours ==
Inducted into the Australian Football Hall of Fame in 1996, his citation read:

The VFL's first 'Prince of Umpires'. Moving from the VFA to the newly formed VFL, he officiated in round one, 1897, and retired in 1905 after 147 matches including seven Grand Finals. Moved to Western Australia where he coached East Perth in 1909 then returned to umpiring, adding 120 games and three WAFL grand finals to his senior total before retiring in 1920.
