= List of current AFL Women's coaches =

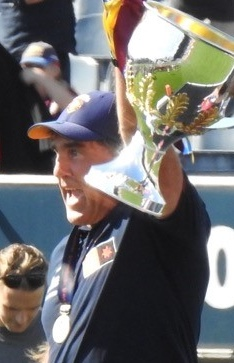
Craig Starcevich holding the AFLW premiership cup in 2023.

This list includes the appointment date and performance record of current AFL Women's senior coaches. Since it commenced in 2017 with eight teams, the league now comprises women's teams aligning with all eighteen of the Australian Football League (AFL) clubs.

Craig Starcevich, the senior coach of the Brisbane Lions since June 2016, was the first coach to be appointed in the league, and is the only remaining current coach from the inaugural season.

== Coaches ==
Statistics are correct to the end of the 2025 Season

Team	Name	Appointed (Note: Appointment date of current term at the team.)			
Team	Name	Appointed	Adelaide	Ryan Davis	1 December 2025
Brisbane	Craig Starcevich	22 June 2016			
Carlton	Mathew Buck	4 April 2023			
Collingwood	Sam Wright	22 December 2023			
Essendon	Natalie Wood	17 March 2022			
Fremantle	Lisa Webb	9 February 2023			
Geelong	Mick Stinear	10 December 2025			
Gold Coast	Rhyce Shaw	20 January 2025			
Greater Western Sydney	Cameron Bernasconi	12 April 2022			
Hawthorn	Daniel Webster	5 February 2024			
Melbourne	Tom Wilson	6 April 2026			
North Melbourne	Darren Crocker	4 June 2020			
Port Adelaide	Glenn Strachan	10 March 2026			
Richmond	Jarrad Donders	23 February 2026			
St Kilda	Nick Dal Santo	2 August 2021			
Sydney	Colin O'Riordan	17 December 2025			
West Coast	Daisy Pearce	11 December 2023			
Western Bulldogs	Tamara Hyett	16 February 2024			

== See also ==
- List of current Australian Football League coaches
- List of current NRL Women's coaches
