= Bill Matthews (footballer) =

Australian rules footballer

Personal information
- Full name: William Henry Matthews
- Born: 18 May 1876; Ararat, Victoria
- Died: 22 February 1923 (aged 46); East Melbourne, Victoria
- Original team: Ballarat
- Position: Defence

Playing career^{1}
Years	Club	Games (Goals)
1894, 1896	St Kilda (VFA)	30 (1)
1897–1902	St Kilda	80 (7)
Total		110 (8)
- ^{1} Playing statistics correct to the end of 1902.

William Henry Matthews (18 May 1876 – 22 February 1923) was an Australian rules footballer who played with St Kilda in the VFA and Victorian Football League (VFL).

== Family ==
The son of William Henry Matthews, and Amy Victoria Matthews (1853-1900), née Hadland, William Henry Matthews was born in Ararat, Victoria on 18 May 1876.

== Football ==
=== St Kilda (VFA) ===
He played 30 games, and kicked one goal, with the VFA team St Kilda.

=== St Kilda (VFL) ===
He played another 80 games, kicking seven goals, with St Kilda when it moved to become part of the VFL in 1897, making him the first St Kilda player to reach 100 games for the club.

Matthews had the dubious distinction of being the first VFL player ever reported.

In the round 7 match against Carlton on 18 June 1898, he was reported for using abusive language towards the field umpire Ivo Crapp. The charge was upheld at a meeting of the VFL, and although he was only reprimanded, the chairman, Arthur Hewitt Shaw (1859–1939), the VFL President, warned Matthews that, "if he came before the league again for any offence the lesson would not be a caution, but disqualification for life".

Matthews' record of two wins from 80 games is the second worst record in the VFL/AFL; and, in each of the six seasons he played for St Kilda (1897–1902), the team finished last.

== Death ==
He died on 22 February 1923.

"A dead man, aged, about 45, 5ft.10in. high, with a moustache and wearing a blue suit, was found on the Elwood pier this afternoon." — The Herald, 22 February 1923.
"Constable [Alexander Carl] Steinfort, of Elwood, yesterday afternoon found a man lying at the entrance to the pier. From papers found in the man's pockets, his name is thought to be W.H. Matthews, a railway employe[e]. The body was taken to the Morgue. On both sides of the mouth were reddish stains." — The Argus, 23 February 1923.
"The body of the man found dead and suspected of having poisoned himself on the pier at Elwood on Thursday last has been identified as that of William Henry Matthews, railway motorman, 40, who had lived in Fawkner street, South Yarra. He has left a widow and two children." — The Herald, 27 February 1923.
