= Jaymie Graham =

Australian rules footballer (born 1983)

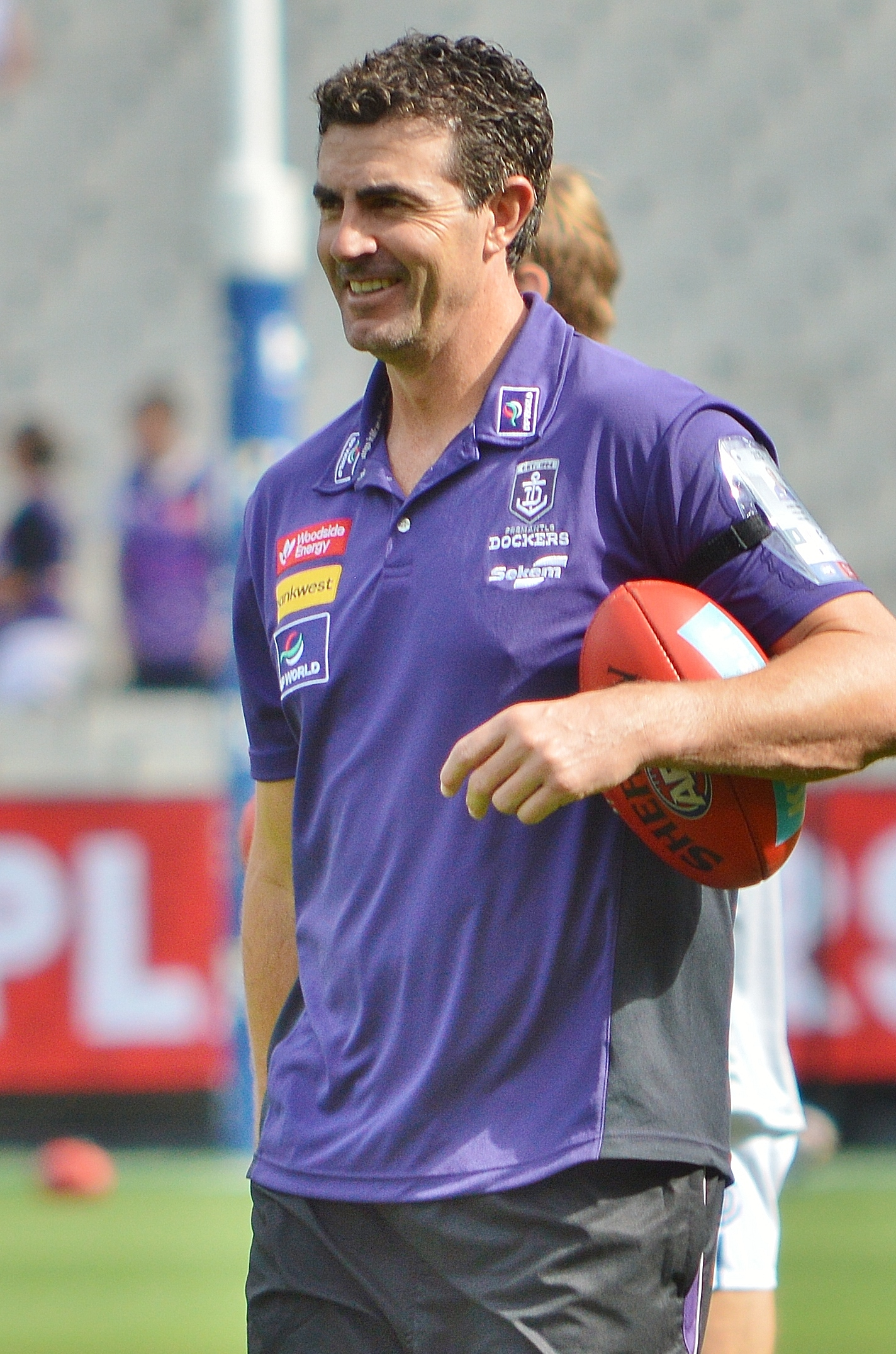
- Graham with Fremantle in April 2025

Personal information
- Full name: Jaymie Wayne Graham
- Born: 6 February 1983 (age 43); Kalgoorlie
- Original team: Mines Rovers Football Club (GFL)

Playing career^{1}
Years	Club	Games (Goals)
2005–2008	West Coast	37 (13)

Representative team honours
Years	Team	Games (Goals)
2009	Western Australia	1 (0)

Coaching career
Years	Club	Games (W–L–D)
2018	West Coast	1 (1–0–0)
2022	Fremantle	2 (2–0–0)
2027–	North Melbourne	0 (0–0–0)
Total		3 (3–0–0)
- ^{1} Playing statistics correct to the end of 2008.

Career highlights
- South Fremantle premiership side 2005, 2009; South Fremantle captain 2011

Jaymie Wayne Graham (born 6 February 1983) is a former Australian rules footballer who played for the West Coast Eagles in the Australian Football League (AFL), a former assistant coach of the Fremantle football team and the incumbent senior coach of the North Melbourne Football Club.

== Playing career ==
Originally from Kalgoorlie, where he played for the Mines Rovers Football Club, Graham joined WAFL club South Fremantle in 2002. He was drafted into the AFL by the Eagles with the 40th selection in the 2004 AFL Rookie draft. He was elevated from the West Coast Eagles rookie list in 2005 and made his debut for the club in Round 3 of that year against Fremantle.

In the 2006 season Graham emerged as a key fixture in the West Coast Eagles backline and was named the Eagles best rookie for the year. He played in 24 games, missing only one game, the 2006 AFL Grand Final, making way for David Wirrpanda who was coming back from injury. He has also, on occasion, been moved forward and has kicked 13 goals in his 37 games. Graham won a grand final with WAFL club side South Fremantle in 2005, when they defeated the Claremont Tigers.

Graham only played 5 games in 2007, struggling to overcome injury and a form slump. At the conclusion of the 2008 season he retired from the AFL, citing personal reasons.

He continued to play for South Fremantle, playing mainly as a ruckman. However, after playing all 22 games in 2009, including the victorious 2009 WAFL Grand Final, his 2010 and 2011 seasons were both hampered by serious knee injuries. In 2010 he ruptured his posterior cruciate ligament, which prevented him from playing in the second half of the season. Despite this setback, he was named as captain of South Fremantle for the 2011 season. After playing his 100th game for South Fremantle in the opening round of the 2011 WAFL season, in Round 7 Graham had his leg trapped under an oncoming player and badly dislocated his kneecap and ruptured his anterior cruciate ligament, forcing his retirement from the sport.

== Coaching career ==
In Round 2, 2018, Graham served as caretaker coach of the West Coast Eagles after regular coach Adam Simpson was forced to return to Perth for family health reasons.

Prior to the 2022 AFL season, Graham switched to become an assistant coach of the Fremantle Football Club. He was appointed as the replacement head coach for the round 3 Western Derby against the Eagles as well as the next round, after head coach Justin Longmuir was forced to isolate at home after being declared a COVID close contact, leading the team to wins in both matches.

North Melbourne Football Club senior coach (2027-present)

At the start of the 2026 AFL Trade Period, reports emerged that Graham was a leading contender to become the new senior coach of the North Melbourne Football Club, replacing the sacked Alastair Clarkson. On 6 October 2026, the club officially announced Graham as their senior coach, signing a 3 year contract. Explaining the decision, club president Sonja Hood said "He (Graham) is widely respected across the industry as a developer of talent and a connector of people..."
