= Bill Cooke (footballer) =

Australian rules footballer (1883–1956)

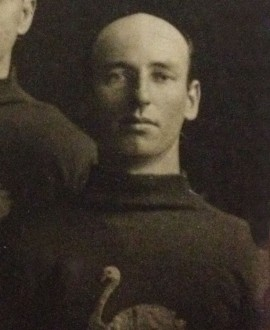
- Cooke in 1912

Personal information
- Full name: William Henry Hercules Cooke
- Born: 14 February 1883; Moonta, South Australia
- Died: 14 February 1956 (aged 73); Heidelberg, Victoria
- Original team: Mines Rovers
- Height: 175 cm (5 ft 9 in)
- Weight: 74 kg (163 lb)

Playing career^{1}
Years	Club	Games (Goals)
1912	Collingwood	1 (1)
- ^{1} Playing statistics correct to the end of 1912.

William Henry Hercules Cooke (14 February 1883 – 14 February 1956) was an Australian rules footballer who played with Collingwood in the Victorian Football League (VFL).

== Family ==
The son of William James Cooke (1861–1910), and Ellen Cooke (1863–1958), née Rosser, William Henry Hercules Cooke was born at Moonta, South Australia on 14 February 1883.

He married Ada Poulter (1886–1925) in 1905.

== Football ==
Recruited from the Mines Rovers Football Club, in the Western Australian Goldfields Football League, he played in one game (1 goal) for Collingwood in the VFL, against Essendon, at the East Melbourne Cricket Ground, on 29 June 1912.

== Boxing ==
He was also a boxer.

== Death ==
He died, on his 73rd birthday, at Heidelberg, Victoria, on 14 February 1956.
