= Bill Cook (footballer, born 1937) =

Australian rules footballer

Personal information
- Full name: Bill Cook
- Born: 31 May 1937
- Height: 180 cm (5 ft 11 in)
- Weight: 80 kg (176 lb)

Playing career^{1}
Years	Club	Games (Goals)
1958–60	Geelong	25 (35)
- ^{1} Playing statistics correct to the end of 1960.

Bill Cook (born 31 May 1937) is a former Australian rules footballer who played with Geelong in the Victorian Football League (VFL).
