= Grand final replay =

Tiebreaker in Australian football

A grand final replay was a method of deciding the winner of a competition when a grand final is drawn. It is commonly used in football codes, particularly in Australian rules football. It was most notably used in the Australian Football League on three occasions—most recently in 2010—prior to its abolition in 2016, following the addition of a sudden death overtime period in the event a game in the event the game is tied in extra time.

== Australian rules football ==
Until 1991, Australian football had no structure in place to break a tie in a finals game. As such, the teams would reconvene the following week to replay their game, pushing back the rest of the finals schedule by one week.

This caused controversy in 1990, when the qualifying final between Collingwood and West Coast was drawn. It meant that the minor premiers Essendon had a two-weekend bye instead of one, and many insisted that the extended layoff had contributed to their losses to Collingwood, both in the second semi-final and in the grand final. Additionally, by 1990 there were many more events and corporate entertainment functions scheduled around the AFL finals than had been the case in 1977 (when the previous finals draw had occurred), and the delay in the finals schedule caused chaos for venues and hotels as these events were rescheduled.

To avoid a repeat of these undesirable outcomes, the AFL initiated the use of extra time (five minutes each way) to decide drawn finals, except for the grand final (that being the case in 2010), from 1991 onward. However, from 1991 until 2015, a grand final replay would still be played after a drawn grand final. In the days after the 2010 drawn grand final (before the replay), a provision was added that extra time be played if the replay were drawn, rather than playing a second replay.

In 2016, the grand final replay was abolished. As for other finals matches, drawn grand finals are now resolved with two five-minute periods of extra time; if the scores are still tied at the end of the extra time period, play will continue until the next score. The procedure was modified in 2019 so that three-minute halves of extra time would be played until a winner was determined.

=== Australian football grand final replays ===
- 1894, SANFL
  - Grand final: Norwood 4.8 drew South Adelaide 4.8
  - Grand final replay: Norwood 4.7 def. South Adelaide 3.5
- 1906, West Australian State Premiership
  - Grand final: East Fremantle 6.11.47 drew Mines Rovers 7.5.47
  - Grand final replay: East Fremantle 7.5.47 def. Mines Rovers 3.10.28
- 1919, SANFL
  - Grand final: Sturt 5.9.39 drew North Adelaide 5.9.39
  - Grand final replay: Sturt 3.5.23 def. North Adelaide 2.6.18
- 1931, TANFL
  - Grand final: Cananore 9.12.66 drew North Hobart 9.12.66
  - Grand final replay: Cananore 8.9.57 def. North Hobart 8.6.54
- 1948 VFL Grand Final
  - Grand final: Essendon 7.27.69 drew Melbourne 10.9.69
  - Grand final replay: Essendon 7.8.50 def. by Melbourne 13.11.89
- 1958, VFA
  - Grand final: Williamstown 6.15.51 drew Moorabbin 7.9.51
  - Grand final replay: Williamstown 13.18.96 def. Moorabbin 8.16.64
- 1977 VFL Grand Final
  - Grand final: Collingwood 10.16.76 drew North Melbourne 9.22.76
  - Grand final replay: Collingwood 19.10.124 def. by North Melbourne 21.25.151
- 2010 AFL Grand Final
  - Grand final: Collingwood 9.14.68 drew St Kilda 10.8.68
  - Grand final replay: Collingwood 16.12.108 def. St Kilda 7.10.52

== Rugby league ==
Both the 1977 and 1978 New South Wales Rugby League Grand Finals ended in draws, and were subsequently replayed. The 1977 replay was held one week later, the 1978 replay three days later.

In the 1977 decider, 20 minutes of extra time was played, this proviso was dropped for the following season. However, after two games were drawn in the 1978 finals series and hence necessitated replays, extra time was re-instated in 1979. In 2003, the system of golden point overtime was adopted. This was the method in finals football until the 2016 season. All finals are now decided with extra time then resorting to golden point if scores are still level.

=== NSWRL grand final replays ===
- 1977
  - Grand final: St. George 9 drew Parramatta 9.
  - Grand final replay: St. George 22 def. Parramatta 0.
- 1978
  - Grand final: Manly 11 drew Cronulla 11.
  - Grand final replay: Manly 16 def. Cronulla 0.
