= Mines Rovers Football Club =

Australian rules football club

Names
- Full name: Mines Rovers Football Club
- Former name: Mines Football Club
- Nickname: "Diorites"
- Club song: Good Old Diorites Forever
- Best and fairest: Osmetti Medal

Club details
- Founded: 1898
- Colours: Royal Blue White
- Competition: Goldfields Football League
- President: Jeff Delbridge
- Coach: Marc Johnstone
- Captain: Jordan Delbridge
- Premierships: 43
- Ground: Digger Daws Oval

Uniforms
Home	Away

Other information
- Official website: "Mines Rovers Football Club". SportsTG.

Mines Rovers Football Club is an Australian rules football team playing in the Goldfields Football League, a league based in the Goldfields region of Western Australia. Founded in 1898 as Mines Football Club, the club has enjoyed a long-standing involvement in the league. It was one of the first clubs in the region to play Australian football and help popularise the sport over rugby. The GFL was known as the Goldfields Football Association (GFA) from 1901 to 1907 and 1920–25, and as the Goldfields National Football League (GNFL) from 1926 to 1987. Mines Rovers play home games at Digger Daws Oval, one they are co tenants with other GFL member, Boulder City Football Club. Mines Rovers currently hold the record for most premierships in the GFL with 43.

== History ==
The club was formed on Thursday 30 March 1898 during a meeting held at Powell's Hotel in Kalgoorlie. The club was originally simply known as 'Mines' and wore the colours of black and white. The club tasted early success, winning the last Hannans District Football Association premiership in 1900 and the inaugural Goldfields Football Association premiership in 1901.

=== Song ===
Good old Diorites forever,
Good old mighty white and blue.
No matter what the situation,
Mines Rovers will win through.
Never mind the opposition,
Our tradition gives us might.
Stick at the task and never falter,
For you're a Diorite.

Club	Nickname	Location	Home ground (capacity)	First season	Premierships	Premiership years
Mines Rovers Football Club	Diorites	Boulder, Western Australia	Digger Daws Oval (4500)	1898	43	1900, 1901, 1902, 1906, 1914, 1915, 1918, 1921, 1922, 1923, 1926, 1934, 1936, 1937, 1938, 1940, 1946, 1947, 1949, 1951, 1955, 1956, 1957, 1961, 1965, 1967, 1968, 1969, 1970, 1972, 1991, 1993, 1995, 1996, 2001, 2003, 2004, 2007, 2008, 2009, 2010, 2015, 2018

== Grand final appearances ==
The list of grand final appearance including premiership teams and runners-up is detailed below.

Year	Premiers	Runners-up
1900	Mines Rovers	
1901	Mines Rovers	
1902	Mines Rovers	
1906	Mines Rovers	
1914	Mines Rovers	
1915	Mines Rovers	
1916–17	(No competition due to World War I)	
1918	Mines Rovers	
1921	Mines Rovers	
1922	Mines Rovers	
1923	Mines Rovers	
1926	Mines Rovers	Kalgoorlie Railways
1928	Boulder City	Mines Rovers
1932	Boulder City	Mines Rovers
1934	Mines Rovers	Kalgoorlie City
1935	Boulder City	Mines Rovers
1936	Mines Rovers	Kalgoorlie City
1937	Mines Rovers	Kalgoorlie City
1938	Mines Rovers	Boulder City
1939	Kalgoorlie Railways	Mines Rovers
1940	Mines Rovers	Boulder City
1942–44	(No competition due to World War II)	
1945	Kalgoorlie Railways	Mines Rovers
1946	Mines Rovers	Kalgoorlie Railways
1947	Mines Rovers	Boulder City
1949	Mines Rovers	Boulder City
1950	Boulder City	Mines Rovers
1951	Mines Rovers	Kalgoorlie Railways
1953	Kalgoorlie City	Mines Rovers
1954	Kalgoorlie City	Mines Rovers
1955	Mines Rovers	Kalgoorlie City
1956	Mines Rovers	Kalgoorlie Railways
1957	Mines Rovers	Kalgoorlie City
1960	Kalgoorlie Railways	Mines Rovers
1961	Mines Rovers	Boulder City
1964	Kalgoorlie Railways	Mines Rovers
1965	Mines Rovers	Kalgoorlie Railways
1967	Mines Rovers	Kalgoorlie Railways
1968	Mines Rovers	Boulder City
1969	Mines Rovers	Boulder City
1970	Mines Rovers	Kalgoorlie Railways
1971	Kalgoorlie Railways	Mines Rovers
1972	Mines Rovers	Kalgoorlie Railways
1973	Kalgoorlie Railways	Mines Rovers
1975	Kalgoorlie Railways	Mines Rovers
1979	Kalgoorlie Railways	Mines Rovers
1981	Kambalda	Kalgoorlie City
1985	Kambalda	Mines Rovers
1987	Kalgoorlie Railways	Mines Rovers
1988	Kalgoorlie City	Mines Rovers
1991	Mines Rovers	Boulder City
1992	Kalgoorlie City	Mines Rovers
1993	Mines Rovers	Kambalda
1994	Boulder City	Mines Rovers
1995	Mines Rovers	Boulder City
1996	Mines Rovers	Boulder City
1999	Kalgoorlie City	Mines Rovers
2000	Kalgoorlie Railways	Mines Rovers
2001	Mines Rovers	Kalgoorlie Railways
2002	Kalgoorlie Railways	Mines Rovers
2003	Mines Rovers	Boulder City
2004	Mines Rovers	Boulder City
2007	Mines Rovers	Kalgoorlie Railways
2008	Mines Rovers	Kambalda
2009	Mines Rovers	Kalgoorlie Railways
2010	Mines Rovers	Kalgoorlie Railways
2015	Mines Rovers	Kalgoorlie Railways
2016	Boulder City	Boulder City
2017	Kalgoorlie Railways	Mines Rovers
2018	Mines Rovers	Boulder City

== Western Australian state premiership ==
During early periods of West Australian football, the Western Australian state premiership was contested intermittently between 1903 and 1924 between the winners of the Western Australian Football Association and Goldfields Football Association. Mines Rovers competed on 3 occasions but were unsuccessful on their attempts. Their closest match was a draw with East Fremantle but were beaten in the replay.

=== Matches played ===
Year	Winner	Scores		Loser	Result	Venue	Ref
Year	Winner	Winner	Loser	Loser	Result	Venue	Ref
1906 (replay) (Note: The 1906 match, at East Fremantle Oval, ended in a draw, with both teams locked at 47 points. The match was replayed the following weekend at the same ground, with East Fremantle winning by 19 points.)	East Fremantle	6.11 (47)	7.5 (47)	Mines Rovers	Match drawn	East Fremantle Oval	
1906 (replay)	East Fremantle	7.5 (47)	3.10 (28)	Mines Rovers	East Fremantle won by 19 points	East Fremantle Oval	
1922	East Perth	16.15 (111)	5.4 (34)	Mines Rovers	East Perth won by 77 points	Perth Oval	
1923	East Perth	10.10 (70)	6.4 (40)	Mines Rovers	East Perth won by 30 points	Kalgoorlie Oval	

== Notable players ==
- Albert Paterson – Carlton Player (1897).
- Fred Hiskins – Essendon premiership player (1901), VFL Leading Goalkicker (1901), Essendon leading goalkicker (1901).
- Hugh Gavin – Essendon captain 1904.
- John Woollard – Port Adelaide captain 1910.
- William "Nipper" Truscott – Australian Football Hall of Fame inductee (1996), W.A. Football Hall of Fame inductee (2004).
- Bill Cooke – Collingwood Player (1912).
- Tom Outridge – Inaugural winner of the Sandover Medal (1921).
- Lou Daily – 1935 Sandover Medalist for Subiaco.
- Joe Fanchi – Premiership player for West Perth kicked the winning goal for WA against Victoria 1961 National Carnival.
- Brian MacGregor – East Perth Player and Life Member.
- Alec Epis – Essendon Premiership Player (1962, 1965), Essendon Hall of Fame, 4 x Victorian State Representative.
- Luke Toia – Fremantle Player (1996-2003), AFL Rising Star nominee (1996).
- Jaymie Graham – South Fremantle Premiership Player (2005, 2009), West Coast Player & Interim Coach (1 Game), Fremantle Interim Coach (2 Games).
- Dion Fleay – Breckler Medallist (2006, 2007, 2011) for West Perth.
- Hayden Kennedy – Subiaco Premiership Player.
- Eddie Betts – 3× All-Australian: (2015, 2016, 2017).
- Dom Sheed – 2018 West Coast Premiership Player, AFL Rising Star nominee (2015).
- McKenzie Dowrick – Brisbane Player (2019), Inaugural West Coast Player (2020–21), Adelaide Player (2022-Current).
- Abbey Dowrick – Port Adelaide Player (2022-Current), AFL Women's Rising Star nominee (2022).
- Tyrell Dewar – West Coast Player (2023)
- Robert Hansen Jr – North Melbourne Player (2023)

== See also ==
- Australian rules football in the Goldfields region of Western Australia
