= Bill Cooke (defensive end) =

American football player (born 1951)

No. 78, 76, 72, 67
- Positions: Defensive end, defensive tackle

Personal information
- Born: February 26, 1951 (age 75); Lowell, Massachusetts, U.S.
- Listed height: 6 ft 5 in (1.96 m)
- Listed weight: 249 lb (113 kg)

Career information
- High school: Worcester Academy (Worcester, Massachusetts)
- College: Connecticut; UMass
- NFL draft: 1975: 10th round, 244th overall pick

Career history
- Green Bay Packers (1975); San Francisco 49ers (1976–1977); Detroit Lions (1978); Seattle Seahawks (1978-1980)

Career NFL statistics
- Games played: 75
- Games started: 7
- Fumble recoveries: 2
- Stats at Pro Football Reference

William Morrill Cooke (born February 26, 1951) is an American former professional football player who was a defensive end in the National Football League (NFL) who played for the Green Bay Packers, the San Francisco 49ers, the Detroit Lions and the Seattle Seahawks. He played college football for the Connecticut Huskies and UMass Minutemen. Listed at 6'-5" and 249 lbs, he played professionally for six seasons and retired in 1980.

== Early life ==
Bill was born February 26, 1951, in Lowell, Massachusetts, and grew up in neighboring Chelmsford where he attended Chelmsford High School and then Worcester Academy in Worcester.

== College years ==
Cooke first played collegiate ball for the University of Connecticut, and then from 1973 to 1974 at University of Massachusetts Amherst Under head coach Dick MacPherson, before being selected by the Green Bay Packers in the tenth round of the 1975 NFL draft.

(1974) Senior year, he was named to First-team All-Yankee Conference, and played alongside teammates; Ed McAleney, Tim Berra & Steve Schubert.
