= Bill Cooke (American football coach) =

American football coach

Playing career
- 1970–1972: Fort Lewis

Coaching career (HC unless noted)
- 1976–1977: Fort Lewis (assistant)
- 1982–1983: Fort Lewis (DC)
- 1984–1987: Fort Lewis
- 1988: Missouri Southern (interim HC)
- 1989–1999: Missouri Southern (DC)
- 2000–2003: Missouri Southern

Head coaching record
- Overall: 35–54–1

Accomplishments and honors

Championships
- 1 RMAC (1984)

Bill Cooke is an American former college football coach. He served as the head football coach at his alma mater, Fort Lewis College in Durango, Colorado from 1984 to 1987 and at Missouri Southern State University on an interim basis in 1988 and full-time from 2000 to 2003, compiling a career college football coaching record of 35–49–1.

== Head coaching record ==
Year	Team	Overall	Conference	Standing	Bowl/playoffs
Fort Lewis Raiders (Rocky Mountain Athletic Conference) (1984–1987)
1984	Fort Lewis	7–2–1	7–0–1	1st	
1985	Fort Lewis	6–3	5–2	2nd	
1986	Fort Lewis	4–5	4–2	T–2nd	
1987	Fort Lewis	3–6	3–3	T–4th	
Fort Lewis:		20–16–1	19–7–1		
Missouri Southern Lions (Central States Intercollegiate Conference) (1988)
1988	Missouri Southern	3–7	2–5	T–6th	
Missouri Southern Lions (Mid-America Intercollegiate Athletics Association) (2000–2003)
2000	Missouri Southern	2–9	2–7	8th	
2001	Missouri Southern	4–6	3–6	T–7th	
2002	Missouri Southern	5–6	3–6	T–6th	
2003	Missouri Southern	1–10	1–8	9th	
Missouri Southern:		15–38	11–32		
Total:		35–54–1			
National championship Conference title Conference division title or championship game berth
