= Justin Longmuir =

Australian rules footballer, born 1981

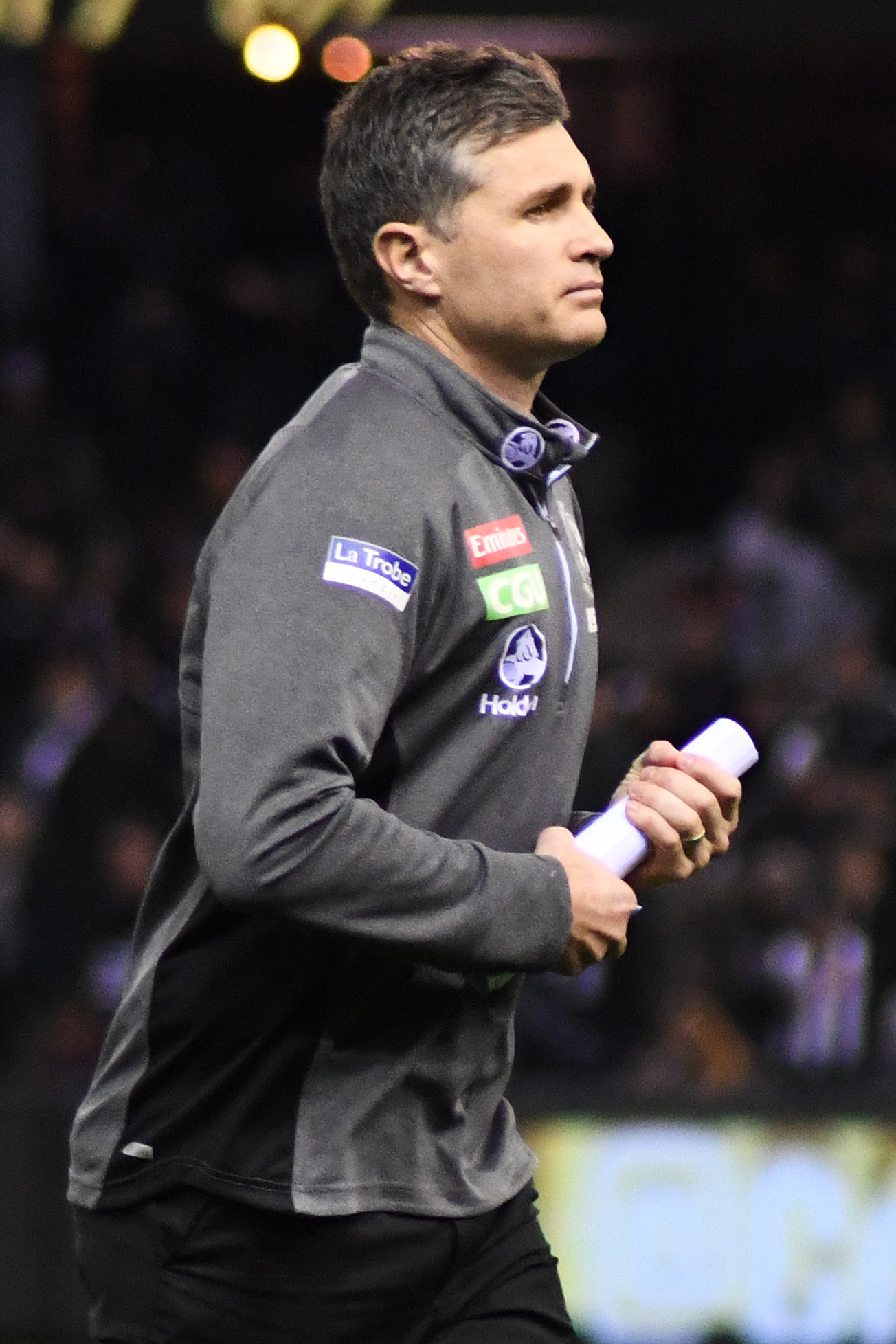
- Longmuir with Collingwood in August 2018

Personal information
- Full name: Justin Longmuir
- Nickname: JL
- Born: 21 January 1981 (age 45)
- Draft: No. 2, 1998 national draft
- Height: 196 cm (6 ft 5 in)
- Weight: 98 kg (216 lb)
- Position: Forward / Ruckman

Playing career^{1}
Years	Club	Games (Goals)
1999–2007	Fremantle	139 (166)

Coaching career^{3}
Years	Club	Games (W–L–D)
2020–	Fremantle	157 (90–65–2)
- ^{1} Playing statistics correct to the end of 2007.^{3} Coaching statistics correct as of the preliminary finals, 2026.

Career highlights
- Fremantle 25 since ‘95 Team; Fremantle leading goalkicker (2001); JJ Leonard Coach of the Year Medal: 2026; AFLCA Senior Coach of the Year: 2026

Justin Longmuir (born 21 January 1981) is a former Australian rules footballer who is the senior coach of Fremantle in the Australian Football League (AFL). Originally recruited with pick 2 in the 1998 national draft by Fremantle from West Perth, Longmuir has progressed from a key position player to an assistant coach and ultimately returning to his original club as senior coach.

Longmuir's AFL playing career took place entirely at Fremantle from 1999 to 2007, where he played 139 games as a forward and ruckman. His career was hampered by a chronic knee injury, leading to his retirement at age 26. He was Fremantle's leading goalkicker in 2001 and famously kicked a goal after the siren against St Kilda in 2005.

After his retirement, Longmuir served as an assistant coach at the West Coast Eagles from 2010 to 2017. In late 2017, Longmuir moved to Collingwood to become a defence coach.

In September 2019, Longmuir was appointed the senior coach of Fremantle. In 2022 Longmuir coached the club back to the finals series for the first time since 2015.

== AFL playing career ==
=== Fremantle Football Club ===
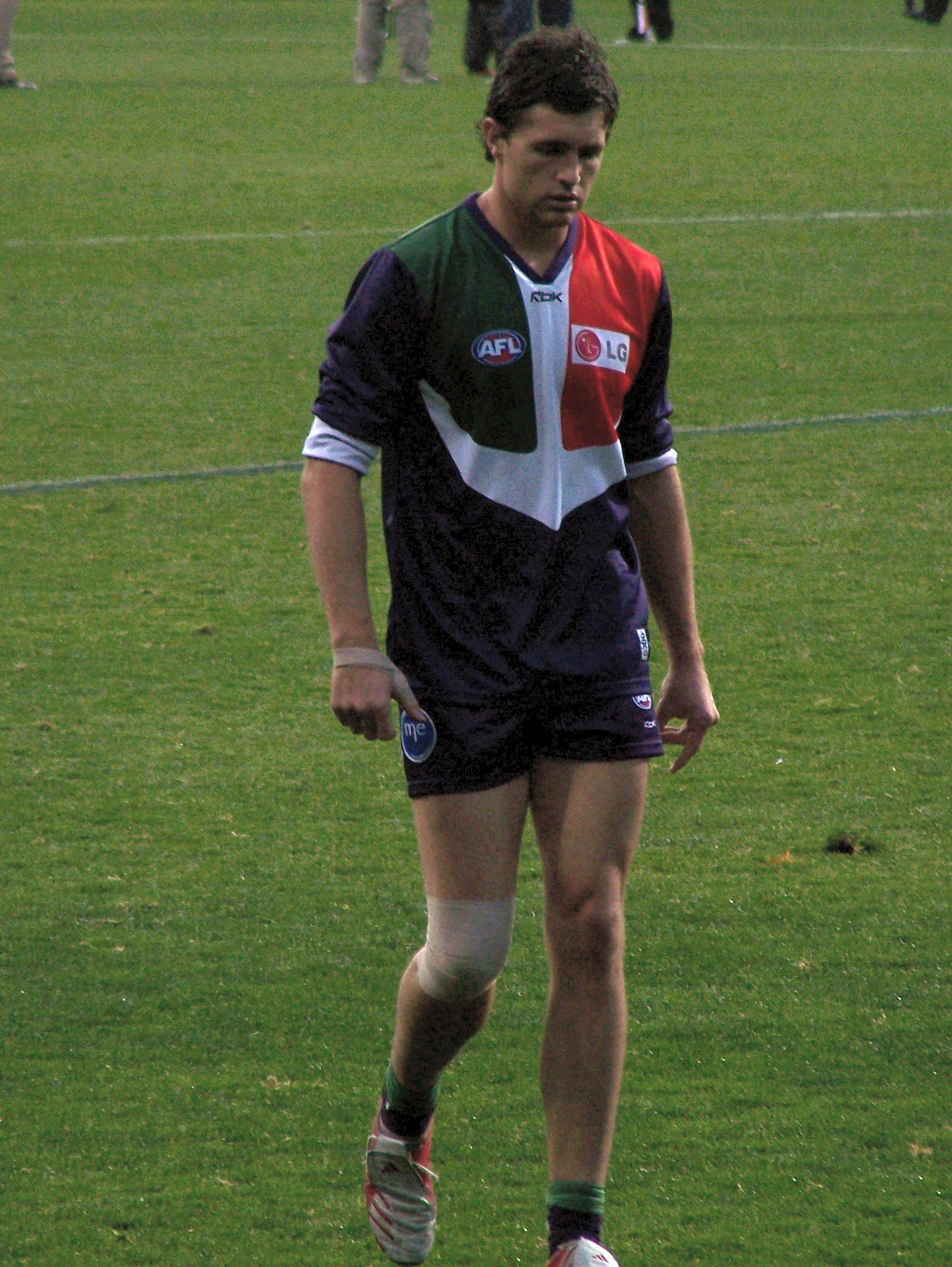
Longmuir playing for Fremantle in 2006, with a bandaged knee

Longmuir was recruited by the Fremantle Football Club as the number 2 draft pick in the 1998 AFL draft (from West Perth Football Club) and made his debut in Round 22, 1999, against Geelong at Shell Stadium. Longmuir played for Fremantle Football Club from 1999 until 2007, where he played a total of 139 games as a forward and ruckman, kicking 166 goals.

He played 21 of the 22 games in 2005 and led the club in hard ball gets and finished third in the club for contested marks and overall marks. The most memorable moment in 2005 was his after-the-siren goal to snatch victory over St Kilda in Round 21. He took a big pack mark, which prompted Nine commentator Eddie McGuire to shout "Longmuir's taken a screamer!".

Longmuir showed plenty of composure under pressure and was considered dangerous when he was at his peak.

Longmuir's career was put on hold as he battled a degenerative knee injury, and eventually conceded his retirement from AFL on 31 October 2007 due to the knee injury, which saw him play just 18 games in his last 2 years.

== Coaching career ==
=== West Coast Eagles assistant coach (2010–2017) ===
Longmuir was appointed as an assistant coach in the role of development coach of the West Coast Eagles under senior coach John Worsfold at the end of the 2010 season. At the end of the 2011 season, Longmuir switched his assistant coaching position to the role of forward coach, replacing Peter Sumich, who switched to Longmuir's former club, Fremantle. Longmuir then spent seven years as an assistant coach at West Coast Eagles, including under senior coach Adam Simpson, who replaced Worsfold at the end of the 2013 season. Longmuir left the West Coast Eagles at the end of the 2017 season.

=== Collingwood Football Club assistant coach (2017–2019) ===
At the end of the 2017 season, Longmuir was appointed as an assistant coach in the role of the defence coach at Collingwood under senior coach Nathan Buckley.

=== Fremantle Football Club senior coach (2020–present) ===
In September 2019, after nine years as an assistant coach with both West Coast and Collingwood, Longmuir was appointed senior coach at his former club Fremantle, replacing caretaker senior coach David Hale, who replaced Ross Lyon during the 2019 season with one game left to go. Longmuir's first season as senior coach was during the shortened COVID-19–affected 2020 AFL season. Fremantle under Longmuir finished twelfth on the AFL ladder with seven wins and ten losses and did not make the finals.

The 2021 AFL season saw the Dockers under Longmuir finish eleventh place on the ladder, with ten wins and twelve losses. He signed a two-year contract extension at the season's end.

In the 2022 AFL season, Longmuir guided the Dockers to fifth position on the ladder and a return to finals for the first time since 2015. Fremantle under Longmuir defeated and eliminated the Western Bulldogs in the elimination final, but the Dockers were however eliminated by Collingwood in the semi finals.

The 2023 AFL season saw Fremantle under Longmuir finish 14th on the ladder with 10 wins and 13 losses. The decrease in performance from making finals the previous year was criticised, albeit with some acknowledgment that the team was one of the youngest in the league.

Already contracted until the end of 2024, Longmuir signed a one-year contract extension in March 2024, tying him to Fremantle until at least the end of 2025. He coached his 100th game in round 17 of the 2024 AFL season against the Richmond Tigers at Optus Stadium. Despite spending a large majority of the season inside the top eight, Fremantle under Longmuir would lose their last four games to finish tenth with twelve wins, ten losses and one draw and narrowly missing finals.

The 2025 AFL season saw Fremantle under Longmuir finish 6th on the ladder with 16 wins and 7 losses, returning to finals for the first time since 2022. The Dockers hosted an elimination final against the Gold Coast Suns, losing by one point. At the beginning of the 2025 season, it was announced that Longmuir would move to an ongoing employment agreement with Fremantle starting in 2026, rather than a traditional multiple year contract arrangement.

The 2026 AFL season was the best start to a season for the Fremantle Dockers, winning 14 straight matches after losing their opening game. This was also the longest winning streak ever by a major West Australian sporting club. Fremantle ultimately finished the season first on the ladder, securing the minor premiership with a round to go. They ended with a club record 19 win and 4 loss season, and were unbeaten at home. After losing their Qualifying Final, Longmuir led Fremantle to victories in their next two finals to reach the AFL Grand Final for only the club's second time. The West Australian Football League awarded him the JJ Leonard Coach of the Year award as the best Western Australian-based football coach for the season. He was also awarded the AFLCA Allan Jeans Senior Coach of the Year Award, the first Fremantle senior coach to win the award.

During the off-season in late 2026, Longmuir travelled to Scotland to act as a specialist assistant coach with the Scotland national rugby union team to improve their high ball play.

In November 2026 Longmuir was announced as the coach of the Western Australia team for the 2027 AFL Origin game against South Australia.

== Personal life ==
Longmuir grew up in Koorda, 236 kilometres east of Perth. He is the brother of former Melbourne, Fremantle and Carlton player Troy Longmuir.

== Statistics ==
=== Playing statistics ===
Statistics are correct to the end of 2007.

Legend
G	Goals	K	Kicks	D	Disposals	T	Tackles
B	Behinds	H	Handballs	M	Marks

Season	Team	No.	Games	Totals								Averages (per game)								Votes
Season	Team	No.	Games	G	B	K	H	D	M	T	H/O	G	B	K	H	D	M	T	H/O	Votes
1999	Fremantle	20	1	1	0	2	3	5	1	1	4	1.0	0.0	2.0	3.0	5.0	1.0	1.0	4.0	0
2000	Fremantle	20	12	3	2	58	35	93	27	8	97	0.3	0.2	4.8	2.9	7.8	2.3	0.7	8.1	0
2001	Fremantle	20	22	28	13	161	120	281	95	31	248	1.3	0.6	7.3	5.5	12.8	4.3	1.4	11.3	4
2002	Fremantle	20	22	36	29	152	78	230	111	26	101	1.6	1.3	6.9	3.5	10.5	5.0	1.2	4.6	1
2003	Fremantle	20	22	38	29	121	50	171	78	24	81	1.7	1.3	5.5	2.3	7.8	3.5	1.1	3.7	3
2004	Fremantle	20	21	26	14	170	129	299	106	47	219	1.2	0.7	8.1	6.1	14.2	5.0	2.2	10.4	0
2005	Fremantle	20	21	15	6	178	120	298	107	34	226	0.7	0.3	8.5	5.7	14.2	5.1	1.6	10.8	3
2006	Fremantle	20	16	19	14	116	80	196	74	21	98	1.2	0.9	7.3	5.0	12.3	4.6	1.3	6.1	4
2007	Fremantle	20	2	0	1	8	10	18	5	2	6	0.0	0.5	4.0	5.0	9.0	2.5	1.0	3.0	0
Career			139	166	108	966	625	1591	604	194	1080	1.2	0.8	6.9	4.5	11.4	4.3	1.4	7.8	15

=== Coaching statistics ===
Statistics are correct to the end of the preliminary finals, 2026.

Team	Year	Home and Away Season					Finals			
Team	Year	Won	Lost	Drew	Win %	Position	Won	Lost	Win %	Result
FRE	2020	7	10	0	.412	12th out of 18	–	–	–	–
FRE	2021	10	12	0	.455	11th out of 18	–	–	–	–
FRE	2022 (Note: Longmuir missed two games as senior coach in rounds 3 & 4, due to being placed under the AFL’s health and safety protocols relating to COVID-19.)	13	6	1	.675	5th out of 18	1	1	.500	Lost to Collingwood in the Semi Final
FRE	2023	10	13	0	.435	14th out of 18	–	–	–	–
FRE	2024	12	10	1	.543	10th out of 18	–	–	–	–
FRE	2025	16	7	0	.696	6th out of 18	0	1	–	Lost to Gold Coast in the Elimination Finals
FRE	2026	19	4	0	.826	1st out of 18	2	1	.666	Lost to Brisbane Lions in the Grand Final
Total		90	65	2	.576		3	3	.500	

== See also ==
- After the siren kicks in Australian rules football
