= Kalgoorlie City Football Club =

Australian rules football club in Kalgoorlie, Western Australia

Kalgoorlie Kangas

Names
- Full name: Kalgoorlie City Football Club
- Nickname: Kangas

2012 season
- After finals: Runners up (lost 50-95 to Railways in Grand Final)
- Best and fairest: Alex Stewart (2012)

Club details
- Founded: 1895
- Colours: Black and white
- Competition: Goldfields Football League
- Chairperson: Alan Moyle
- Coach: Shane Properjohn
- Captain: Dave Clark (2007)
- Ground: Sir Richard Moore Sports Complex (capacity: 3,600)

Other information
- Official website: www.KangasFC.com

Kalgoorlie City Football Club is an Australian rules football club competing in the Goldfields Football League.

The club is based at Sir Richard Moore Sports Complex in Kalgoorlie, Western Australia, and was formed in 1895 as the Hannans Club, making it one of the oldest football clubs in country Western Australia.

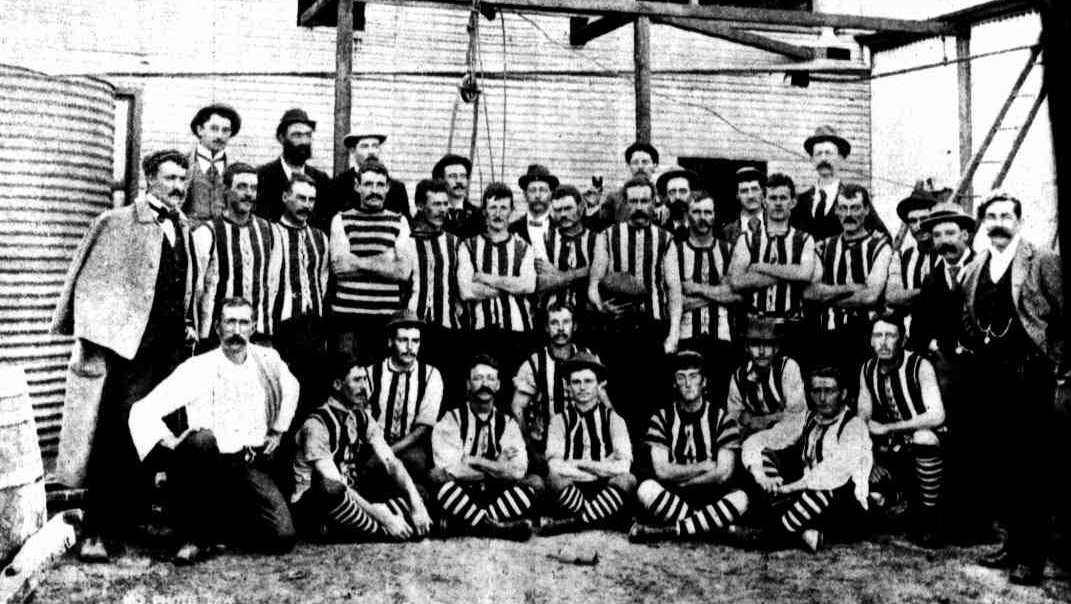
Kalgoorlie City Football Club's first premiership team in 1897. Full forward Alex McKenzie, who was recruited from Port Adelaide, is wearing horizontal stripes.

The Kangas have won thirteen premierships in their history (1897, 1927, 1930, 1941, 1953, 1954, 1962, 1980, 1984, 1988, 1992, 1999 and 2013). The clubs first premiership in 1897 was won with Port Adelaide full forward Alex McKenzie.

Kalgoorlie City have two major rivals. Railways FC is the club's main rival, this is due to the fact both are based in Kalgoorlie and share the same home ground. Kalgoorlie tend to represent more of the middle class of the towns population, and Railways the working class. The other major rivalry is shared with Boulder FC, and this is somewhat of a microcosm of the (antiquated) rivalry between the towns of Kalgoorlie and Boulder before they fused to form the city of Kalgoorlie-Boulder.

The club finished as runners up in 2012 after losing to Railways in the Grand Final (7.8-50 to 14.11-95).

Kalgoorlie played Railways again in the 2013 Grand Final and came out on top (10.5-65 to 7.2-44). The Kalgoorlie Colts side also experienced success capping off an undefeated season defeating Boulder Tigers in the Grand Final (14.12-96 to 9.10-64)
