= Goldfields Football League =

Australian rules football league

- Formerly: Hannans District Football Association (1896–1901); Goldfields Football Association (1901–1907 and 1920–1925); Goldfields National Football League (1926–1987)
- Sport: Australian rules football
- Founded: 1896
- First season: 1896
- Owner: West Australian Football Commission
- No. of teams: 5
- Country: Australia
- Venues: Digger Daws Oval; Sir Richard Moore Oval; Kambalda Oval
- Most recent champion: Mines Rovers (2025)
- Most titles: Mines Rovers (44)

The Goldfields Football League is an Australian rules football league based in the Goldfields region of Western Australia. Founded in 1896 as Hannans District Football Association, the league enjoyed a seat and full voting rights on the Australian National Football Council until 1919. The first clubs to play Australian football were formed within the region, and the league helped popularise the sport in the region, helping to establish the sport and supplant Rugby in popularity. The GFL was known as the Goldfields Football Association (GFA) from 1901–07 and 1920–25, and as the Goldfields National Football League (GNFL) from 1926–87.

The league currently has two teams based in Kalgoorlie, two teams based in Boulder, and one in Kambalda.

== History ==
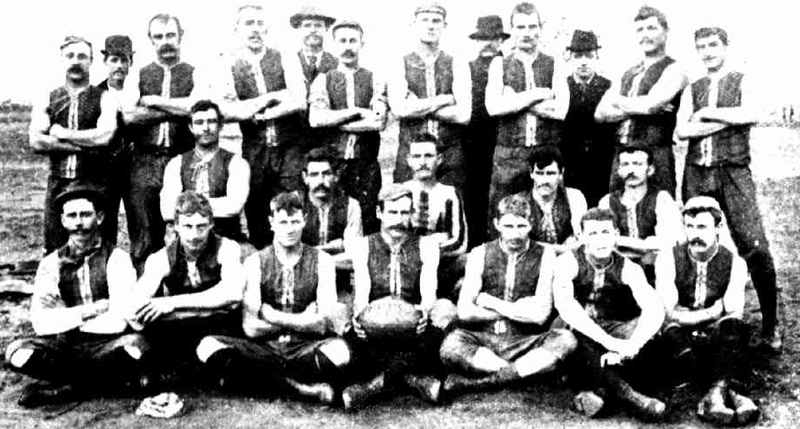
Bonnie Vale Football Club in 1896, one of dozens of clubs which sprang up during the West Australian gold rushes

The league was formed during a meeting held in the Great Boulder Hotel, Kalgoorlie, on 29 July 1896 as the Hannans District Football Association. The association at this point comprised four teams; Boulder City, based in Boulder; Hannans, now known as Kalgoorlie City and based in Kalgoorlie; Victorians, also based in Kalgoorlie; and White Feather, based in Kanowna. Up until the end of the First World War the GFL was considered equal on ability with the WAFL, and a State Championship was contested 12 times between 1903 and 1924, with Goldfields sides winning twice, in 1903 and 1912. The league also had a seat and full voting rights on the Australian National Football Council until 1919, but participated together with the WAFL as Western Australia in inter-state and inter-colonial matches. The 1904 Western Australian inter-state touring team included seven GFL players, and half of the 1908 Melbourne Carnival team were GFL players, including the captain Billy Trewhella.

== Clubs ==
=== Locations ===
Locations of the Goldfields FL clubs

=== Current ===
Club	Colours	Nickname	Home Ground	Est.	Years in GFL	Premierships	
Club	Colours	Nickname	Home Ground	Est.	Years in GFL	Total	Years
Boulder City		Tigers	Digger Daws Oval, Boulder	1896	1896-	28	1896, 1898, 1899, 1907, 1908, 1909, 1910, 1913, 1924, 1925, 1928, 1932, 1933, 1935, 1948, 1950, 1959, 1977, 1982, 1986, 1989, 1990, 1994, 1997, 1998, 2005, 2016, 2023
Kalgoorlie City (Hannans 1896-99)		Kangaroos	Sir Richard Moore Oval, Piccadilly	1895	1896-	15	1897, 1927, 1930, 1941, 1953, 1954, 1962, 1980, 1984, 1988, 1992, 1999, 2013, 2019, 2021
Kalgoorlie Railways		Panthers	Sir Richard Moore Oval, Piccadilly	1899	1900-	34	1903, 1904, 1905, 1911, 1912, 1919, 1920, 1929, 1931, 1939, 1945, 1952, 1958, 1960, 1963, 1964, 1966, 1971, 1973, 1974, 1975, 1978, 1979, 1983, 1987, 2000, 2002, 2006, 2011, 2012, 2014, 2017, 2022, 2024
Kambalda		Eagles	Kambalda Oval, Kambalda East	1968	1969-	3	1976, 1981, 1985
Mines Rovers		Diorites	Digger Daws Oval, Boulder	1898	1898-	44	1900, 1901, 1902, 1906, 1914, 1915, 1918, 1921, 1922, 1923, 1926, 1934, 1936, 1937, 1938, 1940, 1946, 1947, 1949, 1951, 1955, 1956, 1957, 1961, 1965, 1967, 1968, 1969, 1970, 1972, 1991, 1993, 1995, 1996, 2001, 2003, 2004, 2007, 2008, 2009, 2010, 2015, 2018, 2025

=== Former ===
Former clubs include Victorians (1896–97), White Feather (1896–98; 1903–06), Bulong (1897), Rovers (1897), Britannia (1897), Cementers (1898), Kanowna (1899–1901), Paddington (1899), Coolgardie (1901–03; 1905–06), Trafalgar (1902–05), Horseshoe Warriors (1903–08), City (1903), Boulder Stars (1905–06) and Norseman (1971–72; 1974–82).

== Premierships ==
=== List of premiers ===
The complete list of premiers teams is detailed below.

Year	Premiers	Runners-up
1896	Boulder City	
1897	Hannans	
1898	Boulder City	
1899	Boulder City	
1900	Mines Rovers	
1901	Mines Rovers	
1902	Mines Rovers	
1903	Kalgoorlie Railways	
1904	Kalgoorlie Railways	
1905	Kalgoorlie Railways	
1906	Mines Rovers	
1907	Boulder City	
1908	Boulder City	
1909	Boulder City	
1910	Boulder City	
1911	Kalgoorlie Railways	
1912	Kalgoorlie Railways	
1913	Boulder City	
1914	Mines Rovers	
1915	Mines Rovers	
1916–17	(No competition due to World War I)	
1918	Mines Rovers	
1919	Kalgoorlie Railways	
1920	Kalgoorlie Railways	
1921	Mines Rovers	
1922	Mines Rovers	
1923	Mines Rovers	
1924	Boulder City	Kalgoorlie Railways
1925	Boulder City	Kalgoorlie City
1926	Mines Rovers	Kalgoorlie Railways
1927	Kalgoorlie City	Kalgoorlie Railways
1928	Boulder City	Mines Rovers
1929	Kalgoorlie Railways	Boulder City
1930	Kalgoorlie City	Kalgoorlie Railways
1931	Kalgoorlie Railways	Kalgoorlie City
1932	Boulder City	Mines Rovers
1933	Boulder City	Kalgoorlie City
1934	Mines Rovers	Kalgoorlie City
1935	Boulder City	Mines Rovers
1936	Mines Rovers	Kalgoorlie City
1937	Mines Rovers	Kalgoorlie City
1938	Mines Rovers	Boulder City
1939	Kalgoorlie Railways	Mines Rovers
1940	Mines Rovers	Boulder City
1941	Kalgoorlie City	Kalgoorlie Railways
1942–44	(No competition due to World War II)	
1945	Kalgoorlie Railways	Mines Rovers
1946	Mines Rovers	Kalgoorlie Railways
1947	Mines Rovers	Boulder City
1948	Boulder City	Kalgoorlie City
1949	Mines Rovers	Boulder City
1950	Boulder City	Mines Rovers
1951	Mines Rovers	Kalgoorlie Railways
1952	Kalgoorlie Railways	Kalgoorlie City
1953	Kalgoorlie City	Mines Rovers
1954	Kalgoorlie City	Mines Rovers
1955	Mines Rovers	Kalgoorlie City
1956	Mines Rovers	Kalgoorlie Railways
1957	Mines Rovers	Kalgoorlie City
1958	Kalgoorlie Railways	Boulder City
1959	Boulder City	Kalgoorlie City
1960	Kalgoorlie Railways	Mines Rovers
1961	Mines Rovers	Boulder City
1962	Kalgoorlie City	Kalgoorlie Railways
1963	Kalgoorlie Railways	Boulder City
1964	Kalgoorlie Railways	Mines Rovers
1965	Mines Rovers	Kalgoorlie Railways
1966	Kalgoorlie Railways	Boulder City
1967	Mines Rovers	Kalgoorlie Railways
1968	Mines Rovers	Boulder City
1969	Mines Rovers	Boulder City
1970	Mines Rovers	Kalgoorlie Railways
1971	Kalgoorlie Railways	Mines Rovers
1972	Mines Rovers	Kalgoorlie Railways
1973	Kalgoorlie Railways	Mines Rovers
1974	Kalgoorlie Railways	Kambalda
1975	Kalgoorlie Railways	Mines Rovers
1976	Kambalda	Kalgoorlie Railways
1977	Boulder City	Kambalda
1978	Kalgoorlie Railways	Kambalda
1979	Kalgoorlie Railways	Mines Rovers
1980	Kalgoorlie City	Kambalda
1981	Kambalda	Kalgoorlie City
1982	Boulder City	Kalgoorlie Railways
1983	Kalgoorlie Railways	Kambalda
1984	Kalgoorlie City	Kambalda
1985	Kambalda	Mines Rovers
1986	Boulder City	Kalgoorlie City
1987	Kalgoorlie Railways	Mines Rovers
1988	Kalgoorlie City	Mines Rovers
1989	Boulder City	Kalgoorlie Railways
1990	Boulder City	Kalgoorlie Railways
1991	Mines Rovers	Boulder City
1992	Kalgoorlie City	Mines Rovers
1993	Mines Rovers	Kambalda
1994	Boulder City	Mines Rovers
1995	Mines Rovers	Boulder City
1996	Mines Rovers	Boulder City
1997	Boulder City	Kalgoorlie City
1998	Boulder City	Kalgoorlie Railways
1999	Kalgoorlie City	Mines Rovers
2000	Kalgoorlie Railways	Mines Rovers
2001	Mines Rovers	Kalgoorlie Railways
2002	Kalgoorlie Railways	Mines Rovers
2003	Mines Rovers	Boulder City
2004	Mines Rovers	Boulder City
2005	Boulder City	Kalgoorlie City
2006	Kalgoorlie Railways	Boulder City
2007	Mines Rovers	Kalgoorlie Railways
2008	Mines Rovers	Kambalda
2009	Mines Rovers	Kalgoorlie Railways
2010	Mines Rovers	Kalgoorlie Railways
2011	Kalgoorlie Railways	Boulder City
2012	Kalgoorlie Railways	Kalgoorlie City
2013	Kalgoorlie City	Kalgoorlie Railways
2014	Kalgoorlie Railways	Kalgoorlie City
2015	Mines Rovers	Kalgoorlie Railways
2016	Boulder City	Mines Rovers
2017	Kalgoorlie Railways	Mines Rovers
2018	Mines Rovers	Boulder City
2019	Kalgoorlie City	Boulder City
2020	(No competition due to the COVID-19 pandemic)	
2021	Kalgoorlie City	Boulder City
2022	Kalgoorlie Railways	Boulder City
2023	Boulder City	Kalgoorlie Railways
2024	Kalgoorlie Railways	Kalgoorlie City
2025	Mines Rovers	Boulder City

== 2012 ladder ==
Goldfields	Wins	Byes	Losses	Draws	For	Against	%	Pts	Final	Team	G	B	Pts	Team	G	B	Pts
Railways	16	0	0	0	1781	837	212.78%	64	1st semi	Mines	19	15	129	Boulder	18	7	115
Kalgoorlie	8	0	7	1	1413	1360	103.90%	34	2nd semi	Railways	19	9	123	Kalgoorlie	10	11	71
Mines	8	0	8	0	1582	1427	110.86%	32	Preliminary	Kalgoorlie	14	8	92	Mines	11	12	78
Boulder	6	0	9	1	1375	1389	98.99%	26	Grand	Railways	14	11	95	Kalgoorlie	7	8	50
Kambalda	1	0	15	0	866	2004	43.21%	4									

== 2013 ladder ==
Goldfields	Wins	Byes	Losses	Draws	For	Against	%	Pts	Final	Team	G	B	Pts	Team	G	B	Pts
Railways	13	0	3	0	1654	821	201.46%	52	1st semi	Mines	18	10	118	Kambalda	5	9	39
Kalgoorlie	12	0	4	0	1817	898	202.34%	48	2nd semi	Railways	12	10	82	Kalgoorlie	8	12	60
Mines	10	0	6	0	1600	1082	147.87%	40	Preliminary	Kalgoorlie	11	12	78	Mines	8	4	52
Kambalda	5	0	11	0	1068	1489	71.73%	20	Grand	Kalgoorlie	10	5	65	Railways	7	2	44
Boulder	0	0	16	0	669	2518	26.57%	0									

== 2014 ladder ==
Goldfields	Wins	Byes	Losses	Draws	For	Against	%	Pts	Final	Team	G	B	Pts	Team	G	B	Pts
Railways	14	0	2	0	1420	753	188.58%	56	1st semi	Mines	10	15	75	boulder	6	6	42
Kalgoorlie	10	0	6	0	1200	977	122.82%	40	2nd semi	Railways	7	6	48	Kalgoorlie	6	2	38
Mines	6	0	10	0	1284	1144	112.24%	24	Preliminary	Kalgoorlie	16	7	103	Mines	12	10	82
Boulder	5	0	11	0	983	1307	75.21%	20	Grand	Railways	17	9	111	Kalgoorlie	9	9	63
Kambalda	5	0	11	0	828	1534	53.98%	20									

== 2015 ladder ==
Goldfields	Wins	Byes	Losses	Draws	For	Against	%	Pts	Final	Team	G	B	Pts	Team	G	B	Pts
Mines	14	0	2	0	1787	764	233.90%	56	1st semi	Railways	13	6	84	Kalgoorlie	10	8	68
Boulder	11	0	4	1	1442	1065	135.40%	46	2nd semi	Mines	14	14	98	Boulder	6	8	44
Railways	8	0	7	1	1201	1126	106.66%	34	Preliminary	Railways	10	17	77	Boulder	5	4	34
Kalgoorlie	3	0	13	0	1091	1606	67.93%	12	Grand	Mines	19	9	123	Railways	9	5	59
Kambalda	3	0	13	0	879	1839	47.80%	12									

== 2016 ladder ==
Goldfields	Wins	Byes	Losses	Draws	For	Against	%	Pts	Final	Team	G	B	Pts	Team	G	B	Pts
Boulder	13	0	1	2	1945	685	283.94%	56	1st semi	Railways	10	8	68	Kalgoorlie	9	9	63
Mines	9	0	5	2	1592	787	202.29%	40	2nd semi	Mines	18	5	113	Boulder	12	9	81
Kalgoorlie	9	0	6	1	1216	996	122.09%	38	Preliminary	Boulder	15	13	103	Railways	7	10	52
Railways	6	0	9	1	1360	1015	133.99%	26	Grand	Boulder	12	6	78	Mines	8	7	55
Kambalda	0	0	16	0	262	2966	8.83%	0									

== 2017 ladder ==
Goldfields	Wins	Byes	Losses	Draws	For	Against	%	Pts	Final	Team	G	B	Pts	Team	G	B	Pts
Boulder	12	0	4	0	1618	842	192.16%	48	1st semi	Railways	13	10	88	Kalgoorlie	6	3	39
Mines	11	0	5	0	1615	773	208.93%	44	2nd semi	Mines	10	18	78	Boulder	8	7	55
Kalgoorlie	7	0	9	0	1189	1117	106.45%	28	Preliminary	Railways	11	13	79	Boulder	9	13	67
Railways	10	0	6	0	1262	858	147.09%	40	Grand	Railways	10	9	69	Mines	9	10	64
Kambalda	0	0	16	0	392	2486	15.77%	0									

== 2018 ladder ==
Goldfields	Wins	Byes	Losses	Draws	For	Against	%	Pts	Final	Team	G	B	Pts	Team	G	B	Pts
Mines	12	0	4	0	1562	874	178.72%	48	2nd semi	Mines	13	9	87	Boulder	12	7	79
Boulder	11	0	5	0	1491	890	192.16%	44	1st semi	Kalgoorlie	12	11	83	Railways	9	4	58
Kalgoorlie	10	0	6	0	1082	996	106.45%	40	Preliminary	Boulder	8	15	63	Kalgoorlie	5	8	38
Railways	6	0	10	0	1137	1308	147.09%	24	Grand	Mines	21	5	131	Boulder	7	5	47
Kambalda	1	0	15	0	634	1838	34.49%	4									

== 2019 ladder ==
Goldfields	Wins	Byes	Losses	Draws	For	Against	%	Pts	Final	Team	G	B	Pts	Team	G	B	Pts
Kalgoorlie	11	0	4	1	1258	964	130.50%	46	1st semi	Kambalda	9	10	64	Mines	10	6	66
Boulder	10	0	6	0	1245	1046	119.02%	40	2nd semi	Kalgoorlie	9	7	61	Boulder	2	5	17
Kambalda	8	0	7	1	1277	1025	124.59%	34	Preliminary	Boulder	13	12	90	Mines	8	9	57
Mines	8	0	8	0	1232	1149	107.32%	32	Grand	Kalgoorlie	17	6	108	Boulder	10	7	67
Railways	2	0	14	0	837	1665	50.27%	0									

== Notable players ==
- Hugh Gavin (Boulder City/Boulder Stars/Mines Rovers) – captained Essendon in 1904.
- George Krepp (Boulder City) – won a Sandover Medal for Swan Districts in 1936.
- Gordon Maffina (Boulder City) – won a Sandover Medal for Claremont in 1949 and a Simpson Medal in 1951.
- Phil Matson (Boulder City) – captained WA at the 1914 Sydney Carnival.
- Stephen Michael (Boulder City) – won the 1980 and 1981 Sandover Medals, and the 1983 Simpson Medal. Inducted into the Australian Football Hall of Fame.
- Bert Renfrey (Boulder City) – Captain of the undefeated 1911 South Australian state team.
- Alec Robinson (Boulder City)
- Frank Hailwood (Boulder City) – 150 games for Collingwood (1894–1904)
- Jack Rocchi (Boulder City) – won the 1928 Sandover Medal for South Fremantle.
- Dave Cuzens (Kalgoorlie City) – won Richmond's best & fairest in 1958 and 1959.
- Jerry Dolan (Kalgoorlie City)
- Ted Holdsworth (Kalgoorlie City) – named at full-forward in the Swan Districts Team of the Century.
- Jim Gosnell (Kalgoorlie Railways) – won the 1924 Sandover Medal.
- Dean Kemp (Kalgoorlie Railways) – won a Norm Smith Medal for West Coast and played in two premierships.
- Steve Marsh (Kalgoorlie Railways) – 1952 Sandover Medallist and West Australian Football Hall of Fame Legend.
- Alexander McKenzie (Kalgoorlie City) – Four time Port Adelaide leading goal-kicker. Played for South Australia in 1892 and 1894.
- Ted Rowell (Kalgoorlie Railways)
- Charlie Tyson (Kalgoorlie Railways) – played 144 games in the VFL for Collingwood and North Melbourne, captaining both teams.
- John Quinn Sr. (White Feather/Kanowna) – Port Adelaide captain in 1904–1905, father of champion players Tom Quinn and Bob Quinn.
- John Woollard (Mines Rovers/Kalgoorlie City) – Port Adelaide captain in 1910.
- Lou Daily (Mines Rovers) – won the 1935 Sandover Medal for Subiaco.
- Alec Epis (Mines Rovers)
- Jaymie Graham (Mines Rovers) – played for West Coast.
- Tom Outridge (Mines Rovers) – inaugural winner of the Sandover Medal in 1921.
- "Nipper" Truscott (Mines Rovers) – inducted into the Australian Football Hall of Fame.
- Eddie Betts (Mines Rovers) – Carlton's leading goalkicker in 2010 and 2012.
- Dom Sheed (Mines Rovers) – West Coast premiership player.
- Joe Fanchi (Mines Rovers) – Premiership player for West Perth kicked the winning goal for WA against Victoria 1961 National Carnival

== See also ==
- Western Australian Football: The Clubs, Competitions and Premiers (1885–1945) - Derek Mott
- Australian rules football in the Goldfields region of Western Australia
