= List of VFL debuts in 1901 =

The 1901 Victorian Football League (VFL) season was the fifth season of the VFL. The season saw 100 Australian rules footballers make their senior VFL debut and a further 11 players transfer to new clubs having previously played in the VFL.

== Summary ==
Summary of debuts in 1901
Club	VFL debuts	Change of club
Carlton	13	3
Collingwood	11	2
Essendon	12	0
Fitzroy	9	0
Geelong	9	2
Melbourne	12	1
St Kilda	25	2
South Melbourne	9	1
Total	100	11

== Debuts ==
Name	Club	Age at debut	Round debuted	Games	Goals	Notes
Paddy Noonan	Carlton	25 years, 242 days	1	19	5	Oldest first-time coach in VFL/AFL history. Previously played for Fitzroy.
Harry Pye	Carlton	20 years, 267 days	1	16	1	
Jack Gardiner	Carlton	20 years, 1 days	2	16	5	Brother of Vin Gardiner and father of Jack Gardiner.
Bill Pettit	Carlton	20 years, 113 days	1	15	0	
Alex Barlow	Carlton	21 years, 108 days	14	14	0	
Frank Field	Carlton	21 years, 298 days	14	13	1	
Harry Daniel	Carlton	21 years, 319 days	1	11	0	
Dick Hart	Carlton	19 years, 130 days	1	11	4	
Harry Powell	Carlton	22 years, 314 days	6	8	0	
Jim Loriot	Carlton	22 years, 108 days	1	4	0	
Rhoda McDonald	Carlton	23 years, 33 days	6	4	1	Previously played for Collingwood.
George McGann	Carlton	20 years, 184 days	13	4	0	
Jack Todd	Carlton	20 years, 131 days	17	4	0	
Charles Raff	Carlton	22 years, 207 days	1	3	0	Previously played for St Kilda.
Charlie Stewart	Carlton	20 years, 317 days	5	3	1	
Simon Roberts	Carlton	24 years, 220 days	13	3	0	
Ted Rowell	Collingwood	24 years, 323 days	1	189	175	
Alf Dummett	Collingwood	20 years, 147 days	1	118	10	Brother of Charlie and Arthur Dummett, and uncle of Bob Dummett.
Oscar Hyman	Collingwood	23 years, 190 days	7	41	12	
Alf Boyack	Collingwood	23 years, 241 days	1	23	3	
Jack Farrell	Collingwood	29 years, 121 days	1	22	6	
Ted Leach	Collingwood	18 years, 173 days	11	22	9	Brother of Arthur, and Fred Leach.
Leo Morgan	Collingwood	21 years, 227 days	1	19	6	
Peter Martin	Collingwood	25 years, 284 days	1	15	2	
Bob Bryce	Collingwood	21 years, 301 days	1	13	11	Previously played for South Melbourne.
Bill McCulloch	Collingwood	28 years, 178 days	1	12	5	Previously played for Melbourne.
George Ashman	Collingwood	21 years, 972 days	9	3	1	
Harry Knell	Collingwood	20 years, 231 days	10	1	0	
George Blundell	Collingwood	27 years, 50 days	17	1	1	
Jack McKenzie	Essendon	19 years, 203 days	6	81	90	Father of Jack McKenzie Jr.
Bill Robinson	Essendon	20 years, 272 days	1	71	14	Brother of Alex, Fred and Gordon Robinson, and uncle of Alexander and George Robinson.
Herc Vollugi	Essendon	20 years, 323 days	1	70	5	
Ted Kennedy	Essendon	23 years, 239 days	1	43	1	Brother of James Kennedy.
Fred Mann	Essendon	22 years, 240 days	9	27	1	
Artie White	Essendon	21 years, 332 days	2	6	3	
Jim Kennedy	Essendon	19 years, 165 days	13	4	9	Brother of Ted Kennedy.
Jim Beasley	Essendon	20 years, 157 days	5	2	0	
Bobby Byers	Essendon	30 years, 16 days	1	1	0	
George Ward	Essendon	24 years, 12 days	1	1	0	
Marcus Evans	Essendon	22 years, 189 days	4	1	0	
Mick Morris	Essendon	18 years, 348 days	4	1	0	
Jim Sharp	Fitzroy	18 years, 352 days	1	163	41	
Percy Trotter	Fitzroy	17 years, 245 days	1	109	145	
Alf Wilkinson	Fitzroy	19 years, 180 days	10	80	75	
Alf Bartlett	Fitzroy	22 years, 315 days	4	79	5	
Bob Smith	Fitzroy	23 years, 197 days	8	74	33	
Frank Hince	Fitzroy	19 years, 209 days	15	17	0	
Bertie Loel	Fitzroy	22 years, 180 days	1	15	2	
Matt Paternoster	Fitzroy	21 years, 20 days	1	12	4	Brother of Jim Paternoster.
Ike Woods	Geelong	21 years, 341 days	14	68	108	
Percy Fletcher	Geelong	21 years, 311 days	6	47	4	
Bill Bennion	Geelong	19 years, 352 days	17	46	6	
Frank Bowey	Geelong	19 years, 139 days	1	44	5	
Tim McKeegan	Geelong	23 years, 248 days	14	13	0	Previously played for South Melbourne.
Jack Baker	Geelong	22 years, 361 days	1	7	7	
Billy Gill	Geelong	25 years, 71 days	9	7	1	
Bill Moodie	Geelong	21 years, 220 days	6	4	6	Previously played for South Melbourne.
Don Lord	Geelong	26 years, 134 days	10	2	10	
George Palmer	Geelong	22 years, 20 days	10	1	0	
George Saxbee	Geelong	20 years, 12 days	16	1	0	
Vin Coutie	Melbourne	19 years, 237 days	9	152	212	
Jack Strong	Melbourne	17 years, 72 days	10	78	29	
Lindsay Anderson	Melbourne	17 years, 272 days	6	16	3	
George Cathie	Melbourne	25 years, 107 days	16	15	14	
Jim McLean	Melbourne	21 years, 2 days	1	13	5	
Graham Colclough	Melbourne	17 years, 206 days	2	11	8	Belgian Croix de guerre recipient in World War I.
Harry Boully	Melbourne	21 years, 176 days	9	8	3	
Alf Tredinnick	Melbourne	27 years, 357 days	8	7	1	
Laurie Ogilvie	Melbourne	24 years, 1 days	6	4	3	
Bert Wregg	Melbourne	22 years, 78 days	13	3	3	
Billy Shaw	Melbourne	28 years, 187 days	2	1	0	Previously played for St Kilda.
Ed Garlick	Melbourne	17 years, 227 days	3	1	0	
Harold De Gruchy	Melbourne	20 years, 140 days	10	1	0	Brother of Bill de Grouchy.
Ben Sandford	St Kilda	23 years, 185 days	4	31	5	Brother of Cecil and George Sandford.
Tom Robertson	St Kilda	24 years, 211 days	6	27	7	
Gus Robertson	St Kilda	17 years, 253 days	2	18	1	
Charlie Mullany	St Kilda	19 years, 356 days	5	16	3	
Henry Pinniger	St Kilda	28 years, 330 days	10	12	0	
Alfred Richardson	St Kilda	23 years, 34 days	1	11	2	
George Sandford	St Kilda	28 years, 309 days	3	11	0	Brother of Ben and Cecil Sandford.
Mick O'Loughlin	St Kilda	25 years, 109 days	6	9	0	Previously played for Essendon.
Harry Luck	St Kilda	24 years, 188 days	1	8	0	
Cec Graeme	St Kilda	27 years, 335 days	1	7	0	
Tommy Carr	St Kilda	19 years, 75 days	10	5	0	
John Crennan	St Kilda	20 years, 342 days	12	4	3	
Bob Rinder	St Kilda	22 years, 147 days	1	3	0	
George Carpenter	St Kilda	20 years, 6 days	7	3	1	
Bert Robertson	St Kilda	20 years, 236 days	7	2	1	
Lawrie Delaney	St Kilda	18 years, 11 days	9	2	2	
Reg Wilks	St Kilda	23 years, 116 days	14	2	0	
Roy Adam	St Kilda	18 years, 152 days	15	2	0	
Harry Dowdall	St Kilda	28 years, 309 days	1	1	0	Brother of Jim Dowdall. Previously played for Collingwood.
Bill Anderson	St Kilda	22 years, 321 days	4	1	0	
Tim Murphy	St Kilda	22 years, 307 days	5	1	0	
Bill Nash	St Kilda	18 years, 337 days	5	1	0	
Ern Aurish	St Kilda	22 years, 317 days	9	1	0	
Paddy McGuinness	St Kilda	23 years, 57 days	9	1	0	
Arthur Brennan	St Kilda	20 years, 161 days	15	1	0	Brother of Owen Brennan.
Herb Clements	St Kilda	19 years, 204 days	15	1	1	
Sam Gray	St Kilda	21 years, 23 days	17	1	0	
Bill Scott	South Melbourne	21 years, 106 days	15	61	26	
Norm Rippon	South Melbourne	23 years, 119 days	2	36	2	Brother of Harold and Les Rippon. Previously played for Melbourne.
Frank Worroll	South Melbourne	23 years, 303 days	1	31	12	
Dave Powell	South Melbourne	25 years, 75 days	1	27	13	
Johnny Jackson	South Melbourne	22 years, 182 days	15	15	3	
Harold Bower	South Melbourne	23 years, 29 days	7	13	0	
Arthur Smith	South Melbourne	21 years, 169 days	1	9	0	
Bill O'Hara	South Melbourne	20 years, 330 days	9	5	2	
Artie Hollis	South Melbourne	23 years, 54 days	12	4	0	
Paul Cullen	South Melbourne	18 years, 325 days	7	1	0	
