= 1902 Geelong Football Club season =

Manish tanwar who is serving in Defence Forces Since 2013. Presently he is living in delhi

Geelong Football Club
1902 season
- President: J. McMullen
- Captains: Henry Young (2nd season)
- Home ground: Corio Oval
- VFL Season: 7th
- Finals Series: Did not qualify
- Leading goalkicker: Ike Woods (16 goals)

The 1902 VFL season was the Geelong Football Club's sixth season in the Victorian Football League and its second with Henry Young as captain.

Geelong finished the home-and-away with 7 wins and 10 losses, finishing in seventh position. Geelong did not qualify for the finals series.

The leading goalkicker was Ike Woods with 16 goals.

== Playing List ==
3 players played in all 17 games, and a total of 41 players were used. 17 of those 41 players made their VFL debuts and a further 2 made their Geelong debut, Jim Beasley from Essendon and Tom McLean from Collingwood. 5 players reached the 50 game milestone.

=== Statistics ===
Denotes statistical category leader for season

Geelong's 1902 playing list and statistics
Player	Games	Goals	Milestones
Les Bailiff	17	0	50th Game (Round 14)
Jack Baker	3	3	
Ern Batty	9	1	VFL Debut (Round 3)
Jim Beasley	7	2	Geelong Debut (Round 4)
Norman Belcher	3	2	
Bill Bennion	16	1	
Frank Bowey	9	1	
Tommy Buchan	5	1	
Peter Burns	7	0	
Charlie Coles	8	7	
Fred Cronin	2	0	VFL Debut (Round 15)
Jack Davie	1	0	VFL Debut (Round 3)
Mick Donaghy	14	0	50th Game (Round 8)
Bill Eason	4	0	VFL Debut (Round 1)
Jim Flynn	2	0	
Ivan Forbes	11	7	VFL Debut (Round 7)
Billy Gill	1	0	
Bert Hall	1	1	VFL Debut (Round 12)
Ted Holland	17	4	
James Horman	1	0	
John Hurley	3	1	VFL Debut (Round 12)
Bob Kerr	2	1	VFL Debut (Round 16)
Bill Mahoney	17	11	VFL Debut (Round 1)
Firth McCallum	4	0	
Tim McKeegan	1	0	
Alec McKenzie	10	8	VFL Debut (Round 1)
Tom McLean	11	0	Geelong Debut (Round 4)
Bill Munday	1	0	VFL Debut (Round 3)
Ernest Newling	14	0	
Jimmy Palmer	8	7	50th Game (Round 12)
Arthur Pincott	13	0	50th Game (Round 1)
Herb Pitman	5	0	VFL Debut (Round 12)
Edward Potter	6	4	VFL Debut (Round 9)
Teddy Rankin	15	4	
Arthur Reed	14	2	VFL Debut (Round 1)
Tom Shelley	1	0	VFL Debut (Round 17)
Peter Stephens	6	1	VFL Debut (Round 10)
Hughie Webb	9	4	
Ike Woods	8	16	
Jack Wright	4	0	VFL Debut (Round 13)
Henry Young	16	4	50th Game (Round 6)

== Season summary ==
In a generally poor season, Geelong finished the home-and-away season with 7 wins and 10 losses. After a decent start with a 4 win and 2 loss record, Geelong's lackluster form led to a poor placement of 7th position. Therefore, Geelong did not qualify for the finals series.

=== 1902 Results ===
Key
H	Home game
A	Away game

Table of season results
Round	Date	Result	Score			Opponent	Score			Ground		Attendance	Ladder	Report
Round	Date	Result	G	B	T	Opponent	G	B	T	Ground		Attendance	Ladder	Report
1	3 May	Won	11	12	78	Carlton	6	4	40	Princes Park	A	-	2nd	Report
2	10 May	Lost	3	6	24	Essendon	10	17	77	Corio Oval	H	-	6th	Report
3	17 May	Lost	3	2	20	Collingwood	11	15	81	Victoria Park	A	-	6th	Report
4	24 May	Won	11	11	77	St Kilda	5	3	33	Corio Oval	H	-	5th	Report
5	31 May	Won	5	14	44	South Melbourne	3	9	27	Corio Oval	H	-	4th	Report
6	7 June	Won	3	8	26	Melbourne	2	13	25	Melbourne Cricket Ground	A	-	4th	Report
7	9 June	Lost	3	8	26	Fitzroy	8	14	62	Brunswick Street Oval	A	-	4th	Report
8	14 June	Lost	6	7	43	Carlton	7	5	47	Corio Oval	H	-	5th	Report
9	21 June	Won	4	10	34	Essendon	2	3	15	East Melbourne Cricket Ground	A	-	4th	Report
10	5 July	Lost	6	8	44	Collingwood	12	12	84	Corio Oval	H	-	4th	Report
11	12 July	Won	7	7	49	St Kilda	4	9	33	Junction Oval	A	-	4th	Report
12	19 July	Lost	6	9	45	South Melbourne	7	13	55	Lake Oval	A	-	5th	Report
13	26 July	Won	8	6	54	Melbourne	3	9	27	Corio Oval	H	-	4th	Report
14	2 August	Lost	5	10	40	Fitzroy	9	7	61	Corio Oval	H	-	5th	Report
15	16 August	Lost	5	6	36	Fitzroy	6	15	51	Corio Oval	H	-	5th	Report
16	23 August	Lost	5	9	39	South Melbourne	12	12	84	Lake Oval	A	-	5th	Report
17	30 August	Lost	2	11	23	Collingwood	16	16	112	Victoria Park	A	-	7th	Report

=== Ladder ===
Section A
Section B

#	Team	P	W	L	D	PF	PA	%	Pts
1	Collingwood	14	12	2	0	838	461	181.8	48
2	Essendon	14	10	4	0	690	506	136.4	40
3	Fitzroy	14	9	5	0	783	553	141.6	36
4	Melbourne	14	7	7	0	618	610	101.3	28
5	Geelong	14	7	7	0	604	667	90.6	28
6	Carlton	14	6	8	0	494	653	75.7	24
7	South Melbourne	14	5	9	0	522	535	97.6	20
8	St Kilda	14	0	14	0	408	972	42.0	0

Rules for classification: 1. premiership points; 2. percentage; 3. points for
Source: AFL Tables

(P)	Premiers
	Qualified for finals

#	Team	P	W	L	D	PF	PA	%	Pts
1	Collingwood (P)	17	15	2	0	1121	562	199.5	60
2	Essendon	17	13	4	0	885	625	141.6	52
3	Fitzroy	17	10	7	0	914	726	125.9	40
4	Melbourne	17	9	8	0	800	735	108.8	36
5	South Melbourne	17	7	10	0	700	704	99.4	28
6	Carlton	17	7	10	0	594	770	77.1	28
7	Geelong	17	7	10	0	702	914	76.8	28
8	St Kilda	17	0	17	0	490	1170	41.9	0

Rules for classification: 1. premiership points; 2. percentage; 3. points for
Average score: 45.6
Source: AFL Tables
