= 1901 Geelong Football Club season =

1901 Geelong football club

Geelong Football Club
1901 season
- President: J. McMullen
- Captains: Henry Young (1st season)
- Home ground: Corio Oval
- VFL Season: 1st
- Finals series Series: Semi-final
- Leading goalkicker: Charlie Coles (24 goals)

The 1901 VFL season was the Geelong Football Club's fifth season in the Victorian Football League and its first with Henry Young as captain.

Geelong finished the home and away with 14 wins and 3 losses, finishing in first position, winning the minor premiership. In the final series, Geelong lost to Collingwood in the semi-final. Due to Geelong's great record in the home and away season, Geelong were displeased that the minor premier has the same chance of winning the major premiership as the other finalists. As such, the first Argus system was revoked after only one season.

The leading goalkicker was Charlie Coles with 24 goals.

== Playing List ==
3 players played all 18 games this season, with a total of 33 players being used. Charlie Coles was the leading goalkicker with 24 goals. 9 players made their VFL debuts and 2 players, both from South Melbourne, Tim McKeegan and Bill Moodie. One player reached the 50 game milestone, Teddy Rankin.

=== Statistics ===
Denotes statistical category leader for season

Geelong's 1901 playing list and statistics
Player	Games	Goals	Milestones
Les Bailiff	13	0	
Jack Baker	4	4	VFL Debut (Round 1)
Bill Bennion	2	1	VFL Debut (Round 17)
Frank Bowey	5	0	VFL Debut (Round 1)
Tommy Buchan	14	6	
Peter Burns	17	0	
Charlie Coles	17	24	
Mick Donaghy	17	0	
Percy Fletcher	2	0	VFL Debut (Round 16)
Jim Flynn	13	6	
Billy Gill	6	1	VFL Debut (Round 9)
Jack Hardiman	5	2	
Ted Holland	5	0	
Teddy Holligan	18	4	
James Horman	15	1	
George Lockwood	7	0	
Teddy Lockwood	13	17	
Don Lord	2	0	VFL Debut (Round 10)
Firth McCallum	10	2	
Tim McKeegan	12	0	Geelong Debut (Round 6)
Jim McShane	16	15	
Joe McShane	15	4	
Bill Moodie	4	6	Geelong Debut (Round 6)
Ernest Newling	18	0	
Jack O'Loughlin	10	1	
George Palmer	1	0	VFL Debut (Round 10)
Jimmy Palmer	13	0	
Joe Powell	1	0	
Teddy Rankin	18	9	50th Game (Round 1)
George Saxbee	1	0	VFL Debut (Round 16)
Archie Thompson	8	0	
Ike Woods	5	4	VFL Debut (Round 14)
Henry Young	17	7	

== Season summary ==
=== Results ===
Key
H	Home game
A	Away game
SF	Semi-final

Table of season results
Round	Date	Result	Score			Opponent	Score			Ground		Attendance	Ladder	Report
Round	Date	Result	G	B	T	Opponent	G	B	T	Ground		Attendance	Ladder	Report
1	4 May	Won	2	11	23	Melbourne	3	3	21	Corio Oval	H	-	4th	Report
2	9 May	Won	6	12	48	Fitzroy	5	8	38	Brunswick Street Oval	A	-	2nd	Report
3	11 May	Won	7	13	55	Carlton	3	8	26	Princes Park	A	-	1st	Report
4	18 May	Won	4	10	34	Essendon	4	6	30	Corio Oval	H	-	1st	Report
5	25 May	Lost	3	6	24	Collingwood	4	8	32	Corio Oval	H	-	3rd	Report
6	1 June	Won	11	12	78	St Kilda	2	5	17	Junction Oval	A	-	2nd	Report
7	3 June	Won	9	11	65	South Melbourne	3	4	22	Corio Oval	H	-	2nd	Report
8	8 June	Won	9	5	59	Melbourne	7	4	46	Melbourne Cricket Ground	A	-	2nd	Report
9	22 June	Won	6	16	52	Fitzroy	8	3	51	Corio Oval	H	-	2nd	Report
10	29 June	Won	8	15	63	Carlton	4	7	31	Corio Oval	H	-	1st	Report
11	6 July	Lost	2	12	24	Essendon	6	13	49	East Melbourne Cricket Ground	A	-	1st	Report
12	13 July	Won	12	11	83	Collingwood	6	5	41	Victoria Park	A	-	1st	Report
13	20 July	Won	8	7	55	St Kilda	4	5	29	Corio Oval	H	-	1st	Report
14	27 July	Won	6	13	49	South Melbourne	6	9	45	Lake Oval	A	-	1st	Report
15	10 August	Won	6	18	54	Carlton	3	5	23	Princes Park	A	-	1st	Report
16	17 August	Won	7	12	54	South Melbourne	4	6	30	Corio Oval	H	-	1st	Report
17	24 August	Lost	5	3	33	Essendon	9	12	66	Corio Oval	H	-	1st	Report
SF	31 August	Lost	3	6	24	Collingwood	6	9	45	East Melbourne Cricket Ground	H	10,000	—N/a	Report

=== Ladder ===
Section A
Section B

#	Team	P	W	L	D	PF	PA	%	Pts
1	Geelong	14	12	2	0	712	478	149.0	48
2	Collingwood	14	10	4	0	712	488	145.9	40
3	Essendon	14	9	5	0	848	507	167.3	36
4	Melbourne	14	8	5	1	540	507	106.5	34
5	South Melbourne	14	7	7	0	651	583	111.7	28
6	Fitzroy	14	6	7	1	693	597	116.1	26
7	Carlton	14	2	12	0	396	820	48.3	8
8	St Kilda	14	1	13	0	350	922	38.0	4

Rules for classification: 1. premiership points; 2. percentage; 3. points for
Source: AFL Tables

(P)	Premiers
	Qualified for finals

#	Team	P	W	L	D	PF	PA	%	Pts
1	Geelong	17	14	3	0	853	597	142.9	56
2	Essendon (P)	17	12	5	0	1085	582	186.4	48
3	Collingwood	17	12	5	0	917	579	158.4	48
4	Fitzroy	17	9	7	1	877	666	131.7	38
5	Melbourne	17	9	7	1	716	610	117.4	38
6	South Melbourne	17	8	9	0	727	730	99.6	32
7	Carlton	17	2	15	0	476	1013	47.0	8
8	St Kilda	17	1	16	0	414	1288	32.1	4

Rules for classification: 1. premiership points; 2. percentage; 3. points for
Average score: 44.6
Source: AFL Tables
