= 1901 VFL finals series =

1901 premiership season
- Date: 31 August – 7 September 1901
- Teams: 4
- Premiers: Essendon

Attendance
- Matches played: 3
- Total attendance: 55,041 (18,347 per match)
- Highest: 30031 (Grand Final, Melbourne vs. Fitzroy)

The 1901 Victorian Football League finals series was the 5th annual edition of the VFL final series, the Australian rules football tournament staged to determine the premier of the 1901 VFL season. The series ran over two weekends in August and September 1901, culminating with the 1901 VFL Grand Final at the Lake Oval on 7 September 1901.

The system used for this final series was First Argus system. The system was only used once.

== Ladder ==
1901 VFL ladder
Pos	Team	Pld	W	L	D	PF	PA	PP	Pts	
1	Geelong	17	14	3	0	853	597	142.9	56	Semi-finals
2	Essendon (P)	17	12	5	0	1085	582	186.4	48	Semi-finals
3	Collingwood	17	12	5	0	917	579	158.4	48	Semi-finals
4	Fitzroy	17	9	7	1	877	666	131.7	38	Semi-finals
5	Melbourne	17	9	7	1	716	610	117.4	38	
6	South Melbourne	17	8	9	0	727	730	99.6	32	
7	Carlton	17	2	15	0	476	1013	47.0	8	
8	St Kilda	17	1	16	0	414	1288	32.1	4	

Source: VFL ladder
Rules for classification: 1) points; 2) percentage; 3) number of points for.
(P) Premiers

== Semi-final ==
=== 1st Semi-final ===
1st Semi-final
Saturday, 31 August 1901	Collingwood	def.	Geelong	EMCG (crowd: 10,000)	Report
2.3 (15); 3.5 (23); 5.8 (38); 6.9 (45)	Q1; Q2; Q3; Final	0.2 (2); 1.3 (9); 3.4 (22); 3.6 (24)	Umpires: Gibson
Smith 2, Bryce, Morgan, Rowell, Tulloch	Goals	Bennion, Rankin, Woods

=== 2nd Semi-final ===
2nd Semi-final
Saturday, 31 August 1901	Essendon	def.	Fitzroy	Victoria Park (crowd: 15,000)	Report
0.1 (1); 3.2 (20); 5.7 (37); 6.10 (46)	Q1; Q2; Q3; Final	2.4 (16); 2.6 (18); 3.8 (26); 6.9 (45)	Umpires: Henry "Ivo" Crapp
Thurgood 5, Larkin	Goals	Brosnan 2, Sharp 2, Sharpe 2

== Grand final ==
Grand Final
Saturday, 7 September 1901	Essendon	def.	Collingwood	Lake Oval (crowd: 30,031)	Report
3.0 (18); 5.2 (32); 5.4 (34); 6.7 (43)	Q1; Q2; Q3; Final	0.1 (1); 0.3 (3); 2.3 (15); 2.4 (16)	Umpires: Henry "Ivo" Crapp
Thurgood 3, Kinnear, Martin, McKenzie	Goals	Bryce 2
