= 1901 VFL grand final =

Grand final of the 1901 Victorian Football League season

1901 VFL Grand Final

Essendon	Collingwood
6.7 (43)	2.4 (16)
	1	2	3	4
ESS	3.0 (18)	5.2 (32)	5.4 (34)	6.7 (43)
COL	0.1 (1)	0.3 (3)	2.3 (15)	2.4 (16)
- Date: 7 September 1901
- Stadium: Lake Oval
- Attendance: 30,031

Accolades
- Australian Football Hall of Fame: Albert Thurgood (1996); Charlie Pannam (1996)

The 1901 VFL Grand Final was an Australian rules football game contested between the Essendon Football Club and Collingwood Football Club, held at the Lake Oval in Melbourne on 7 September 1901. It was the 4th annual Grand Final of the Victorian Football League, staged to determine the premiers for the 1901 VFL season. The match, attended by 30,031 spectators, was won by Essendon by a margin of 27 points.

== Teams ==
Essendon	Collingwood

Essendon
B:	Fred Mann	Jim Anderson	Maurie Collins
HB:	Son Barry	Hugh Gavin	Tod Collins (c)
C:	George Hastings	Harry Wright	Herc Vollugi
HF:	Fred Hiskins	Albert Thurgood	Jimmy Larkin
F:	George Martin	Ted Kinnear	George Stuckey
Foll:	Bill Robinson	Jack McKenzie	Billy Griffith

Collingwood
B:	Charlie Dow	Bill Proudfoot (c)	Alf Dummett
HB:	Oscar Hyman	Lardie Tulloch	Bill McCulloch
C:	Charlie Pannam	Fred Leach	Peter Martin
HF:	Bob Bryce	Ted Rowell	Arthur Leach
F:	Jack Farrell	Archie Smith	Leo Morgan
Foll:	Matthew Fell	Frank Hailwood	Alf Boyack

- Umpire – Henry "Ivo" Crapp

== Statistics ==
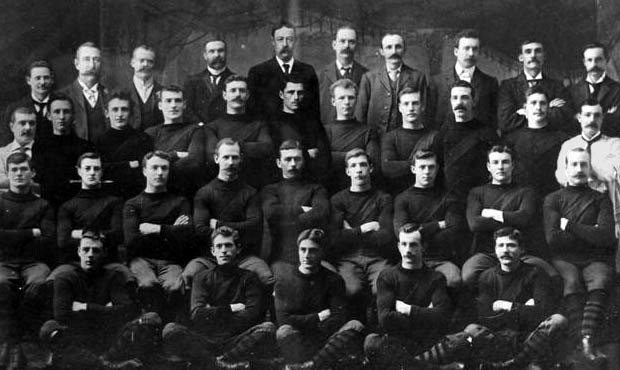
Essendon FC team, Premiers

=== Goalkickers ===
Essendon

- A Thurgood 3
- T Kinnear 1
- G Martin 1
- J McKenzie 1

Collingwood

- B Bryce 2

== See also ==
- 1901 VFL season
