= George Warde (footballer) =

Australian rules footballer

Personal information
- Full name: George Henry Ward
- Born: 10 October 1876; Hotham, Victoria
- Died: 29 September 1934 (aged 57); Adelaide, South Australia
- Original team: Melbourne Juniors
- Height: 178 cm (5 ft 10 in)
- Weight: —

Playing career^{1}
Years	Club	Games (Goals)
1898	Carlton	17 (2)
- ^{1} Playing statistics correct to the end of 1898.

George Henry Ward (10 October 1876 – 29 September 1934) — all official contemporary VFL records, mistakenly, recorded his family name as "Warde" — was an Australian rules footballer who played 17 games for Carlton in the VFL in 1898 and kicked two goals.

== Family name ==
As is the case with another Carlton footballer, Charles Herbert Sweatman (1873–1915), who is mistakenly identified in all contemporary VFL records as "Tom Sweetman", all official contemporary VFL records mistakenly recorded Ward's family name as "Warde".

Both of these are clerical errors, and represent entirely different circumstances from the deliberate deception involved in the case of Percy Edward Rowe (1889–1916) who, given that he was knowingly registered by Collingwood under a false name, is "correctly" registered as Paddy Rowan; or, indeed, in the case of the mysterious "Goodthur", who played in two matches for Essendon at the time that Albert Thurgood was absent, serving a three match suspension for striking St Kilda footballers Mick English and Alf Trevillian: in the back-pocket, against Fitzroy on 14 June 1902 (round 8), and in the ruck, against Melbourne on 5 July 1902 (round 10).

== Family ==
The son of Robert Ward, and Anne Ward, née Roberts, George Henry Ward was born in Hotham, Victoria on 10 October 1876.

== Football ==
Recruited by the VFL team, Carlton, from the Melbourne Juniors, Ward played in every one of the season's (seventeen) home-and-away and sectional-final matches.

His first match for Carlton, playing at full-back, was against South Melbourne, at Princes Park on 14 May 1898; and his last match, playing at half-forward flank, was against South Melbourne, at the Lakeside Oval on 10 September 1898.

== Death ==
He died in Royal Adelaide Hospital on 29 September 1934.
