= Bowey =

Bowey is an English surname. Notable people with this surname include:

- Brett Bowey (born 1969), Australian football player
- Eddie Bowey (1928–2016), English wrestler
- Frank Bowey (1881–1947), Australian football player
- Madison Bowey (born 1995), Canadian ice hockey player
- Olwyn Bowey (born 1936), British artist
- Steve Bowey (born 1974), English football player
