= David Jack (disambiguation) =

David Jack (1899–1958) was an English footballer.

David Jack may also refer to:

- David Jacks (businessman) (born David Jack, 1822–1909), Scottish-born American landowner in California, marketed Monterey Jack cheese
- David Russell Jack (1864–1913), Canadian author, editor, publisher and politician
- Sir David Emmanuel Jack (1918–1998), Governor-General of Saint Vincent and the Grenadines
- Sir David Jack (pharmacologist) (1924–2011), Scottish pharmacologist who became research and development director of Glaxo
- Dave Jack, Canadian ice hockey player for Asiago Hockey 1935 in 1977–78
- David Jack (musician) (born 1960), American children's performer and tap dancer

== See also ==
- Jack Davie (1874–1922), Australian rules footballer
- Jack Davey (1907–1959), New Zealand-born Australian performer
- Jack Davey (cricketer) (born 1944), English left-handed batsman
- David Jacks (footballer) (born 1948), Australian rules footballer
