= Alfred Richardson =

Alfred Richardson may refer to:

- Alfred Richardson (cricketer) (1875–1935), English schoolmaster and cricketer
- Alfred Richardson (politician) (1837–1872), member of the Georgia Assembly in the U.S. State of Georgia
- Alfred Richardson (footballer) (1878–1951), Australian rules footballer
- Alfred Herbert Richardson (1874–1951), English policeman
