= George Ashman =

George Ashman may refer to:

- George Ashman (footballer, born 1879) (1879–1947), Australian rules footballer for Collingwood
- George Ashman (footballer, born 1929) (1929–2015), Australian rules footballer for Fitzroy

== See also ==
- George Ashmun (1804–1870), U.S. Representative from Massachusetts
