= David Jacks =

David Jacks may refer to:

- David Jacks (footballer)
- David Jacks (businessman)

== See also ==
- David Jack (disambiguation)
