= Edward Potter =

Edward Potter may refer to:

- Edward Clark Potter (1857–1923), American sculptor
- Edward Tuckerman Potter (1831–1904), American architect
- Edward E. Potter (1823–1889), Union general in the American Civil War
- Edward Potter (footballer) (1878–1960), Australian rules footballer
