= Paul Cullen =

Paul Cullen may refer to:

- Paul Cullen (cardinal) (1803–1878), Irish archbishop
- Paul Cullen (general) (1909–2007), Australian soldier and grazier
- Paul Cullen (rugby league) (born 1963), English rugby league coach and player
- Paul Cullen (footballer) (1882–1950), Australian rules footballer
- Paul Cullen, Lord Pentland (born 1957), Scottish judge and politician
- Paul Cullen, bass guitarist with Bad Company
- Paul Cullen, poisoned Treaty Oak (Austin, Texas)
