= Trepan Records =

English independent record label

- Founder: Gus Robertson, of Razorlight; Adam Greves
- Country of origin: England
- Location: London
- Official website: http://www.myspace.com/trepanrecords

Trepan Records is an English independent record label and promotion company founded in London in 2007. It hosted The Great Brain Robbery, a B-movie themed evening of live music, burlesque, and DJs featuring guest spots and guerrilla gigs from musicians such as Johnny Borrell of Razorlight, Florence and the Machine, Lily Allen, Mystery Jets, Ed Harcourt and Pete Doherty.

Trepan Records described itself as "the label of the cranially connected – dedicated to drilling a hole in the side of the British music industry to expose our collective cortex". Its merchandise and advertising often uses the term: You Need This... Like A Hole in the Head. Trepan Records released three Cranial Connections compilation albums with a fourth was due in Easter 2008 but it never eventuated. Trepan's first 7" single was released in 2009. It has since fallen into inactivity.

== See also ==
- List of record labels
- Alternative rock
- Independent record labels
