= Frederick Mann (disambiguation) =

Frederick Mann (1869–1958) was chief justice of Victoria, Australia .

Frederick Mann may also refer to:

- Frederick George Mann (1897–1982), British organic chemist
- Frederick Mann (footballer)
- Frederick Mann (USCG), the namesake of a Sentinel class cutter
- USCGC Frederick Mann, a Sentinel class cutter

== See also ==
- Fred Mann (disambiguation)
