= Johnny Jackson =

Johnny Jackson may refer to:

- Johnny Jackson (musician) (1955–2006), drummer for The Jackson 5
- Johnnie Jackson (American football) (born 1967), American football player
- Johnny Jackson (American football) (born 1953), American football player, played defensive end for the Philadelphia Eagles
- Johnny Jackson (Australian footballer) (1879–1939), Australian rules footballer
- Johnnie Jackson (born 1982), footballer
- Johnnie O. Jackson (born 1971), bodybuilder
- Johnny "J" (Johnny Lee Jackson, 1969–2008), musician
- Johnny Jackson Jr. (1945–2018), American politician

== See also ==
- John Jackson (disambiguation)
