= Bill O'Hara =

Bill O'Hara may refer to:

- Bill O'Hara (baseball) (1883–1931), American Major League Baseball outfielder
- Bill O'Hara (footballer, born 1879) (1879–1957), Australian rules footballer for St Kilda
- Bill O'Hara (footballer, born 1880) (1880–1946), Australian rules footballer for South Melbourne
- Bill O'Hara (sailor) (born 1958), Irish Olympic sailor

== See also ==
- William O'Hara (1816–1899), Irish-born prelate of the Roman Catholic Church
