= Fred Mann =

Fred Mann may refer to:

- Fred Mann (baseball) (1858–1916), American center fielder in Major League Baseball
- Fred Mann (footballer) (1878–1970), Australian rules footballer

== See also ==
- Frederick Mann (disambiguation)
