= Crennan =

Crennan is a surname. Notable people with the surname include:

- George Crennan (1900–2001), Australian cleric
- Susan Crennan (born 1945), Australian judge
- John Crennan (1880–1924), Australian rules footballer
