= Donald Gibson (architect) =

English architect (1908–1991)

Sir Donald Edward Evelyn Gibson
- Born: 11 October 1908
- Died: 22 December 1991 (aged 83)
- Occupation: Architect
- Known for: City Architect for Coventry

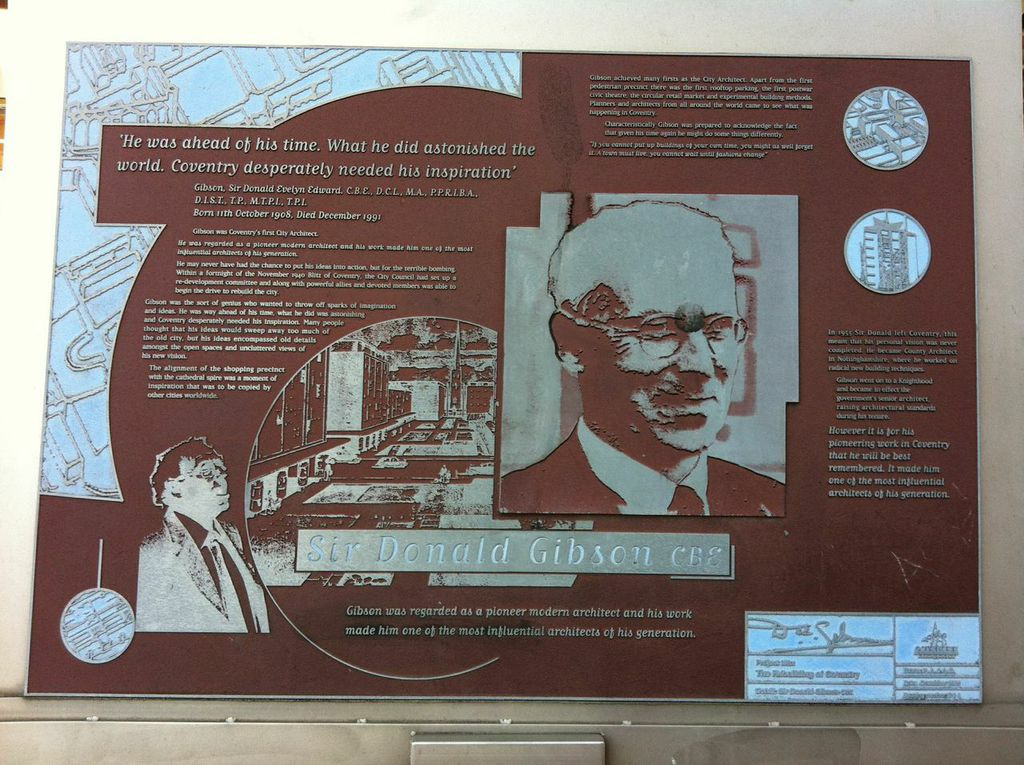
Sir Donald Gibson, Coventry's City Architect sign, as displayed in Coventry City Centre.

Sir Donald Edward Evelyn Gibson CBE (11 October 1908 – 22 December 1991) was an English architect who was the first City Architect and Planning Officer of Coventry from 1938 to 1954. He is best known for the postwar redevelopment of Coventry city centre following the Coventry Blitz.

== Education ==
Gibson was educated at the High School of Dundee and Manchester Grammar School before attending the Manchester School of Architecture. He spent his fourth year at Harvard, training in Boston, USA, before returning to the UK to qualify in 1932.

== Redevelopment of Coventry ==
At the age of 29, Gibson was appointed as Coventry's first city architect and planning officer.

The re-planning of Coventry City Centre began before the Blitz in 1940–1941; indeed, Gibson produced the initial plan to rebuild part of the city in early 1940, in order to resolve the problems of overcrowding and congestion of the medieval town centre. It was, however, the extensive wartime damage that enabled the Gibson plan to be turned into reality.

The Gibson plan involved a re-thinking of the city centre, introducing what was then a brand new town planning concept, with the main premise being a separation of motor traffic and pedestrians. Such traffic-free shopping precinct was the first in Europe, and was seen as a "truly pioneering design" in its day. In addition, Gibson was responsible for the first rooftop parking plus the development of a civic theatre (the Belgrade Theatre) and the circular market.

The Gibson plan saw extensive consultation with local people, with the "proposals and suggestions for the physical reconstruction and planning of the City of Coventry" set out in a book entitled The Future Coventry, published by the Corporation of Coventry. It was also supported by the Government, where the then Minister of Works, Lord Reith commented, "Coventry would be a test case, not for me and my authority, but for the Government and for England".

Gibson was succeeded by Arthur Ling who was City Architect from 1955 until 1964.

The redevelopment of the city was featured in a special edition of Architectural Design published in December 1958.

== Later career ==
Gibson left Coventry in 1955, and became County Architect in Nottinghamshire. Gibson subsequently knighted and became the government's senior architect, responsible for raising architectural standards.

Gibson was external professor of architecture at the University of Leeds from 1966 to 1968.

== Awards ==
Gibson was awarded the Coventry Award of Merit in 1966.

He was President of the Royal Institute of British Architects in 1964–65. A half-length portrait of Gibson in oil, by Olwyn Bowey, owned by RIBA, hangs in the Green Room at the Victoria and Albert Museum. A copy, also by Bowey and dated 1965, was auctioned at Colwyn Bay in August 2023 for a hammer price of £800.
