= Cecil Sandford (footballer) =

Australian rules footballer

Personal information
- Full name: Cecil Everard Sandford
- Born: 2 August 1874; Lara, Victoria
- Died: 12 October 1946 (aged 72); Heidelberg, Victoria

Playing career^{1}
Years	Club	Games (Goals)
1897–1898	Geelong	7 (1)
1900–1904	St Kilda	43 (12)
Total		50 (13)
- ^{1} Playing statistics correct to the end of 1904.

Cecil Everard Sandford (2 August 1874 – 12 October 1946) was an Australian rules footballer who played with Geelong and St Kilda in the Victorian Football League (VFL). He was educated at Geelong College.

Sandford spent the 1897 and 1898 seasons at Geelong, but only put together eight games. He was instantly appointed captain of St Kilda, when he joined them in 1901. His stint as captain began well, with the club ending a four-year win-less streak in his first game for the club. After losing the captaincy for the 1901 season, he had a good year, topping St Kilda's goal-kicking, with nine goals. He later served as the sports master of Scotch College.

Sandford's brothers Ben and George Sandford also played for St Kilda.
