= Leo Morgan =

Leo Morgan may refer to:

- Leo S. Morgan (born 1879), Australian rules footballer
- Léo Morgan, French officer and composer of the Moroccan national anthem
- Leo W. Morgan (born 1913), Australian rules footballer
