= Albert Thurgood =

Australian rules footballer (1874–1927)

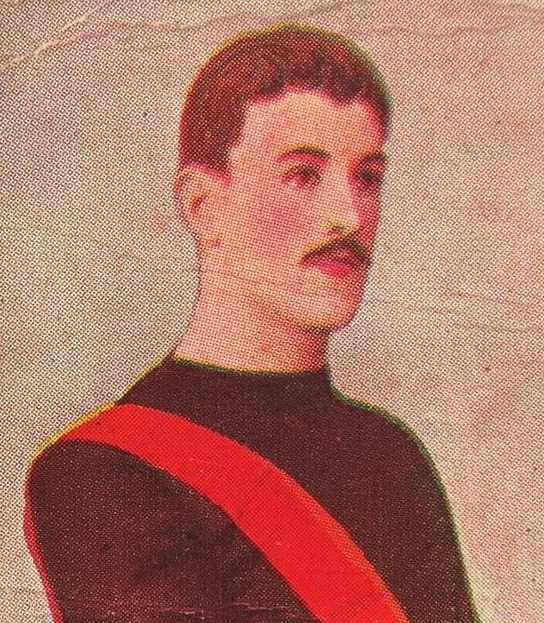

Personal information
- Full name: Albert John Thurgood
- Born: 11 January 1874; North Melbourne, Victoria
- Died: 8 May 1927 (aged 53); Prahran, Victoria
- Height: 183 cm (6 ft 0 in)
- Weight: 76 kg (168 lb)
- Position: Centre half-forward

Playing career^{1}
Years	Club	Games (Goals)
1892–1894	Essendon (VFA)	57 (183)
1895–1897	Fremantle (WAFA)	48 (128)
1899–1902, 1906	Essendon (VFL)	46 (89)
Total		151 (400)
- ^{1} Playing statistics correct to the end of 1906.

Career highlights
- 3× VFA premiership player: 1892, 1893, 1894; 2× WAFA premiership player: 1895, 1896; VFL premiership player: 1901; 3× VFA Leading goalkicker: 1892, 1893, 1894; 3× WAFA Leading goalkicker: 1895, 1896, 1897; VFL Leading Goalkicker: 1900; Best Player winner: 1901; 5× Essendon leading goalkicker: 1892, 1893, 1894, 1900, 1902; Essendon Team of the Century; Australian Football Hall of Fame; West Australian Football Hall of Fame

Albert John Thurgood (11 January 1874 – 8 May 1927) was an Australian rules footballer in the Victorian Football Association (VFA), Victorian Football League (VFL) and the Western Australian Football Association (WAFA).

He is considered one of the great champion players of the VFA and VFL and possibly the longest place kick of any code in history. Described as "an ideal footballer", he usually played at centre-half-forward; but his skill and versatility enabled him to be switched to any position on the ground. He has been described as the "first icon of Australian rules football".

== Family ==
The son of builder/contractor John Joseph Thurgood (1840–1881), and Amelia Mary Thurgood (1854–1901), née Buckland, Albert John Thurgood was born at Errol Street, North Melbourne, on 11 January 1874.

He married Ida Alma Mary Thomas (?–1950) at Fairfield on 26 April 1899. They had two daughters: Marjorie Thurgood (1902–), and Gwenyth Ida Thurgood (1907–?). In 1902–03, following the birth of his first-born daughter, Marjorie, he built a house at 44 Park Crescent in Fairfield.

Thurgood died on 8 May 1927 as the result of a car accident. He was buried with Anglican rites in Brighton Cemetery.

He is the cousin of former Essendon footballer Jimmy Thurgood, and the great-great uncle of former Hawthorn player Josh Thurgood.

== Education ==
He was educated at Brighton Grammar School where he was part of the football team and was recruited to Essendon Football Club from there. At 18 years, and after completing secondary school, he was eagerly pursued by several football clubs including St Kilda and Essendon.

Thurgood chose Essendon for several reasons. At the time, football was seen as an amateur sport and clubs were prohibited from paying players. However, Essendon had implemented a novel system of “billets” – in which the club provided accommodation and found jobs for talented players. In addition, Thurgood’s cousin, Jimmy Thurgood had joined Essendon several years earlier, and he was also connected to some ex-Brighton players who had joined the Essendon Club.

== Football career ==
On leaving school, he joined the Essendon Football Club in the Victorian Football Association (VFA). He was ideally suited to Australian Rules football due to his stature; six-foot tall, weighing 12 stone and extremely agile.

Although he was a solid all-round player, he excelled at accurate, long goal-kicking. He was the first player to kick more than 50 goals in a single season (1892) and then surpassed his own record by kicking more than 60 goals in each of the two consecutive seasons (1893 and 1894). In one notable instance, he scored a place point from 60 yards out.

He played 151 games in his career: 57 VFA games, 46 VFL games, and 48 games with Fremantle in Western Australia (1895–1897).

Thurgood was named Champion of the Colony for two consecutive years (1893 and 1894) and again in 1901. In 1901, he was also named Essendon’s Best and Fairest in the first year that award was presented.

=== VFA ===
Thurgood played for Essendon in the VFA in 1892–1894. At six feet tall (183 cm) and twelve stone (76.2 kg), Thurgood possessed qualities that made him a versatile key position player: he was extraordinarily fast, a superb mark, and very nimble and agile.

His greatest asset was his kicking. Usually playing at centre half-forward, he could regularly kick distances up to 65–70 yards and beyond.

Thurgood kicked 64 goals in 1893, and 63 in 1894. In the last two games of 1893, he scored 21 goals: nine of Essendon's ten goals against North Melbourne, and twelve of Essendon's fourteen goals against Richmond the following week, all extraordinary feats giving the low scoring of the era.

He played 57 VFA games for Essendon and kicked 183 goals.

=== WAFA ===
In 1895 he left Essendon to seek work in Western Australia, and played for the Fremantle Football Club (not connected to the current club of the same name) in the Western Australian Football Association (WAFA). During his stint there he topped the WAFA goal kicking list on three consecutive occasions between 1895 and 1897, helping the side lift premierships in the first two of those years.

=== VFL ===
He returned to Victoria in 1898 and sought to resume his career with Essendon in the newly formed Victorian Football League (VFL, later AFL), but the VFL denied him a permit for residential reasons. Forced to sit out of football in 1898, he finally took the field for Essendon in 1899, and headed the club's goalkicking list in 1900 (25) and 1902 (33).

While contemporaries noted that Thurgood was slower, heavier and less keen, he produced his finest performance in the 1901 VFL Grand Final against Collingwood when he kicked three of the side's six goals and was a major contributor to Essendon's victory. The same year, he won Essendon's Club Champion award.

In 1902, Thurgood received a three match suspension for striking St Kilda players Mick English and Alf Trevillian. In two of the matches when he was absent, one of his team-mates took the field under the nom de guerre "Goodthur", which was used in reports of the game. Football historians Michael Maplestone and Stephen Rogers determined that "Goodthur" was most likely Fred Mann, while official VFL/AFL player statistics reflect this view.

In 1902, there were widespread allegations that he had 'laid down' against Collingwood in the Grand Final, which Essendon lost by 33 points, a heavy margin for the time: in disgust, Thurgood demanded, and was refused, a clearance to the Magpies, whereupon he decided to retire.

He was tempted back to Essendon four years later, but after playing eight games was forced to retire permanently when he sustained a serious ankle injury.

=== Career ===
He held seven records at his retirement: his record place kick of 107 yards, 2 ft 1 in (98.48m) with slight wind assistance at the East Melbourne Cricket Ground 22 June 1899 still stands as the longest place kick in history by a footballer of any code, while his 1893 season total of 64 goals remained an elite Victorian football record until 1915 and an Essendon club record until 1923, his 12 goals in a match was an elite Victorian football record until 1919 and an Essendon club record until 1950, and his career total of 272 goals was an Essendon club record until broken in Round 8 of 1935 by Keith Forbes.

During the 1923 season, in an article discussing the issue of who was a "champion player" — both as outright "champion" and as "champion" in a particular position — the football correspondent for The Argus ("Old Boy"), spoke of his observations of players over the years (at least as early as Carlton's George Coulthard) and, despite the "tremendous difficulty" of such a task, was emphatic that Essendon's Albert Thurgood was his best-ever "champion player" (out of twenty outright "champions", and 62 "champions" in a particular position):

"I have never had any doubt myself that A.J. Thurgood is the best all-round man I ever saw play the game in Victoria. He was a champion goal-kicker, could get the ball for himself, and wherever placed was a champion. In the Essendon premiership and championship teams between 1891 and 1894 he played in every position on the field, and in all was a success. Further than that, he was a match-winner; a man who could do the seemingly impossible and turn a forlorn hope into victory."

== After football ==
He was also a solid cricketer, playing three first XI matches for the North Melbourne Cricket Club during the 1890s; he was also an avid golfer. After his retirement from football, Thurgood became active in horse racing—for some years as a bookmaker and subsequently as an owner. He ran a number of successful horses, including Amazonia, which won the Bagot Handicap in 1921 and was placed third in the Melbourne Cup that year.

In 1996, Thurgood was inducted into the Australian Football Hall of Fame. He was named in the Essendon Team of the Century, which was selected in their VFL/AFL centenary year of 1997. Nicknamed "The Great", he was inducted into the WA Football Hall of Fame in 2004 as an inaugural inductee.

=== Other interests ===
He was an all-round sportsman. In addition to his football career, he played cricket for East Fremantle during 1894–7 and later for North Melbourne and had a passion for golf. He owned a stock and station agent business with premises in Flinders Lane In 1912, he registered as a bookmaker and was given space in the elite “Paddock Reserve” at Flemington racetrack. He enjoyed modest success with racehorses; a horse named Choi took out the Cantala Stakes in 1919, while another, Amazonia, was placed 3rd in the 1921 Melbourne Cup.

== Champions of Essendon ==
In 2002, an Essendon panel ranked him at 9 in their Champions of Essendon list of the 25 greatest players ever to have played for Essendon.

== Honours ==
The Fremantle Football Club and Essendon Football Club created the "Albert Thurgood Challenge" to be played between the two teams. The first ever meeting was known as D-Day. On 11 February 1995 Fremantle won its first official game of AFL, defeating Essendon by 50 points at East Fremantle Oval.

== See also ==
- Australian Football Hall of Fame
- Australian rules football positions
- Coleman Medal
- Crichton Medal
- Fremantle Football Club (1882–1899)
- History of Australian rules football in Victoria (1859–1900)
- Jim 'Frosty' Miller Medal
- List of Essendon Football Club honours
- List of Essendon Football Club leading goalkickers
- List of Essendon Football Club players
- List of VFL debuts in 1899
- West Australian Football Hall of Fame
- 1894 VFA season
- 1897 WAFA season
- 1900 VFL season
- 1901 VFL season
- 1901 VFL Grand Final
- 1902 VFL Grand Final
