= 1921 Melbourne Cup =

Edition of the Melbourne Cup

- Melbourne Cup
- Location: Flemington Racecourse
- Date: 1 November 1921
- Distance: 2 miles
- Winning horse: Sister Olive
- Winning time: 3:27.75
- Final odds: 16/1
- Jockey: Edward O'Sullivan
- Trainer: Jack Williams
- Surface: Turf

The 1921 Melbourne Cup was a two-mile handicap horse race which took place on Tuesday, 1 November 1921.

This year's Melbourne Cup saw chaos when the favourite Eurythmic got its head above the strand tape and when it was raised mayhem ensued. When the race was run it was won by Sister Olive who became the third and most recent filly to win the Melbourne Cup. The third place Amazonia was partly owned by Essendon Football Club champion Albert Thurgood.

Trainer of the winner, Jack Williams was a former jockey who rode Grace Darling to a close second-placed finish in the 1885 Melbourne Cup behind Sheet Anchor.

This is the list of placegetters for the 1921 Melbourne Cup.

Place	Name	Jockey	Trainer
1	Sister Olive	Edward O'Sullivan	Jack Williams
2	The Rover	V. Sleigh	C. Moore
3	Amazonia	L. Franklin	W. Leyshon

== See also ==
- Melbourne Cup
- List of Melbourne Cup winners
- Victoria Racing Club
