= Bob Dummett =

Australian rules footballer

Personal information
- Full name: Arthur Robert Dummett
- Born: 3 October 1935
- Died: 13 April 1994 (aged 58)
- Original team: Ivanhoe Grammar
- Height: 188 cm (6 ft 2 in)
- Weight: 71.5 kg (158 lb)

Playing career^{1}
Years	Club	Games (Goals)
1956–1961	Richmond	77 (200)
- ^{1} Playing statistics correct to the end of 1961.

Career highlights
- Richmond Leading Goalkicker 1956, 1957, 1959; Richmond Seconds Premiership Player 1954, 1955

Arthur Robert "Bob" Dummett (3 October 1935 – 13 April 1994) was an Australian rules footballer who played in the Victorian Football League (VFL) between 1954 and 1961 for the Richmond Football Club.

== Family ==
The son of Victorian cricketer Arthur Dummett (1900–1968), he was the nephew of Collingwood footballers Alf Dummett and Charlie Dummett.

He married Barbara Faith Cain on 6 October 1956.
