= Jimmy Thurgood =

Australian rules footballer

Personal information
- Full name: James Alfred Thurgood
- Born: 21 June 1876; Hotham, Victoria
- Died: 31 July 1946 (aged 70); Malvern, Victoria
- Original team: Essendon District
- Height: 179 cm (5 ft 10 in)
- Weight: 73 kg (161 lb)

Playing career^{1}
Years	Club	Games (Goals)
1897	Essendon	3 (2)
- ^{1} Playing statistics correct to the end of 1897.

James Alfred Thurgood (21 June 1876 – 31 July 1946) was an Australian rules footballer who played with Essendon in the Victorian Football League (VFL).

== Family ==
The son of James Thurgood (1841–1923), and Elizabeth Thurgood (1844–1894), née Weir, James Alfred Thurgood was born in Hotham, now known as North Melbourne, Victoria on 21 June 1876.

He was the cousin of Essendon great Albert Thurgood.

He married Ethel Dalkin (1876–1959) on 16 April 1908.

== Football ==
He made his debut for Essendon in the match against Fitzroy on 29 May 1897. He scored two goals, one of which "[was] a magnificent long angled shot, which fairly staggered the spectators". His cousin, Albert Thurgood, who also played for Essendon, was described as the "first icon of football".

== Death ==
He died at Malvern, Victoria on 31 July 1946.
