= Charles Sweatman =

Australian rules footballer

Personal information
- Full name: Charles Herbert Sweatman
- Born: 29 July 1873; Bendigo, Victoria
- Died: 11 June 1915 (aged 41); Echuca, Victoria
- Original team: Ascot Vale
- Position: Half back / Half forward

Playing career^{1}
Years	Club	Games (Goals)
1897–99	Carlton	30 (3)
- ^{1} Playing statistics correct to the end of 1899.

Charles Herbert Sweatman (29 July 1873 – 11 June 1915) was an Australian rules footballer who played with Carlton in the Victorian Football League (VFL).

== Family ==
The son of John Sweatman (-1925), and Amelia Ann Sweatman (-1917), née Rixon, Charles Herbert Sweatman was born on 29 July 1873.

He married Elizabeth Margaret Critney Kinley (1872-1927) in 1899. (She remarried in 1920, and became Mrs. William Robinson).

== Football ==
He played 30 games over three seasons with Carlton. As was the case with another Carlton footballer, George Henry Ward (1876–1934), whose family name was mistakenly identified in all official VFL records as "Warde", Sweatman was mistakenly identified in official VFL records as "Tom Sweetman". Both of these were clerical errors.

On 1 May 1900 "C.H. Sweatman" was granted a clearance from Carlton to Essendon Town.

On 22 May 1905, "C.H. Sweetman" was granted a clearance from Essendon Town to the Boulder City Football Club in the Goldfields Football League in Western Australia.

In June 1908, "C. Sweetman" was granted a clearance from Boulder City to the Brighton Football Club. Although he was (apparently) selected in the team, he did not play for Brighton in the match against Northcote on 27 June 1908.

== Death ==
He died (suddenly), of heart failure, at the Echuca District Hospital on 11 June 1915.
