= Charlie Dow =

Australian rules footballer

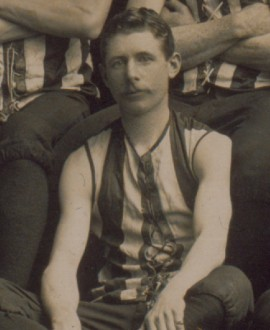
- Dow in 1902

Personal information
- Full name: Charles Dow
- Born: 12 January 1874; South Melbourne, Victoria
- Died: 6 June 1942 (aged 68); Fitzroy, Victoria
- Original team: Albert Park
- Height: 175 cm (5 ft 9 in)
- Weight: 77 kg (170 lb)
- Position: Defender

Playing career^{1}
Years	Club	Games (Goals)
1896	Collingwood (VFA)	16 (1)
1897–02	Collingwood	72 (1)
- ^{1} Playing statistics correct to the end of 1902.

Career highlights
- 1896 VFA Premiership

Charles Dow (12 January 1874 – 6 June 1942) was an Australian rules footballer who played with Collingwood in both the Victorian Football Association (VFA) and Victorian Football League (VFL).

== Family ==
Charles Dow was fourth of eleven children born to violin-maker William Henry Dow (1836–1928) and Isabella Dow, nee Crockett (1847–1920). The family lived in South Melbourne and his eldest brother served as South Melbourne City Treasurer and was active in administration of local football and cricket clubs.

== Football ==
A defender, Dow commenced his football career at Albert Park, a local junior club. In 1896 he joined Collingwood, then in the Victorian Football Association, and was part of their premiership winning side that year.

In 1897 Collingwood were one of the eight foundation clubs of the Victorian Football League and Charlie Dow was a member of team that played their inaugural VFL match. Dow was a regular member of the side until 1902 and he played a total of 72 VFL matches for Collingwood, including being part of Collingwood’s losing 1901 VFL Grand Final team.

== Later life ==
Outside football, Dow worked as a coppersmith, living and working in Collingwood. In 1902 he married Ellen (Nellie) McMahon (1870-1950) and they had five daughters together. In his retirement, The Dow family returned to the South Melbourne area, living in Elwood.

Charles Dow died on 6 June 1942 and is buried at Melbourne General Cemetery.
