= Jim Paternoster =

Australian rules footballer

Personal information
- Full name: James Robert Paternoster
- Born: 27 January 1875; Berwick, Victoria
- Died: 7 November 1954 (aged 79); Chelsea, Victoria
- Original team: Richmond (VFA)

Playing career^{1}
Years	Club	Games (Goals)
1901	Fitzroy	7 (0)
- ^{1} Playing statistics correct to the end of 1901.

James Robert Paternoster (27 January 1875 – 7 November 1954) was an Australian rules footballer who played with Fitzroy.

Recruited from Victorian Football Association (VFA) club Richmond alongside his brother Matt Paternoster, Paternoster made his senior VFL debut in 1901.

Paternoster later served in World War I, enlisting on 24 July 1917 and serving in the 6th Australian Infantry Battalion.

== Sources ==
- Jim Paternoster's playing statistics from AFL Tables
- Jim Paternoster at AustralianFootball.com
