= Herc Vollugi =

Australian rules footballer

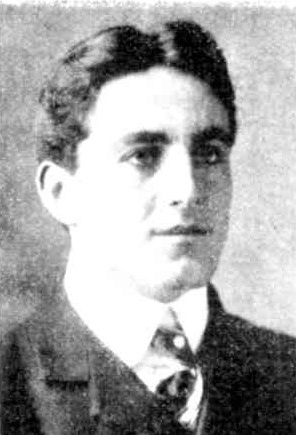
- Vollugi in 1901

Personal information
- Full name: Hercules Anthony Vollugi
- Born: 15 June 1880; Carlton, Victoria
- Died: 11 October 1960 (aged 80); Kew, Victoria
- Original team: St Patrick's (Carlton)
- Height: 170 cm (5 ft 7 in)
- Weight: 71 kg (157 lb)

Playing career^{1}
Years	Club	Games (Goals)
1901–1906	Essendon	70 (5)
- ^{1} Playing statistics correct to the end of 1906.

Career highlights
- VFL premiership player: 1901

Hercules Anthony Vollugi (15 June 1880 – 11 October 1960) was an Australian rules footballer who played with Essendon in the Victorian Football League (VFL).

Vollugi was a wingman in Essendon's 1901 premiership team, which came in his first league season. He also played in the 1902 VFL Grand Final, which Essendon lost.

He later served Essendon as a committeeman.

Vollugi was also a first-grade cricketer for East Melbourne, and a golfer. He became secretary of Elsternwick Golf Club.
