= Ivan Forbes (Australian footballer) =

Australian footballer

Personal information
- Full name: Ivan Robert Forbes
- Born: 16 October 1880; Colac, Victoria
- Died: 1 December 1950 (aged 70); Anglesea, Victoria
- Original team: Colac
- Position: Rover / Half Forward

Playing career^{1}
Years	Club	Games (Goals)
1902–05	Geelong	40 (51)
- ^{1} Playing statistics correct to the end of 1905.

Ivan Robert Forbes (16 October 1880 – 1 December 1950) was an Australian rules footballer who played with Geelong in the Victorian Football League (VFL).
