= Bill Munday =

Australian rules footballer

Personal information
- Full name: William Henry Munday
- Born: 24 January 1876; Geelong, Victoria
- Died: 21 March 1944 (aged 68); Geelong West, Victoria

Playing career^{1}
Years	Club	Games (Goals)
1902	Geelong	1 (0)
- ^{1} Playing statistics correct to the end of 1902.

William Henry Munday (24 January 1876 – 21 March 1944) was an Australian rules footballer who played with Geelong in the Victorian Football League (VFL).
