= Herb Pitman =

Australian rules footballer

Personal information
- Full name: Herbert Ernest Robert Pitman
- Born: 25 June 1881; Geelong, Victoria
- Died: 19 July 1939 (aged 58); Geelong, Victoria

Playing career^{1}
Years	Club	Games (Goals)
1902	Geelong	5 (0)
- ^{1} Playing statistics correct to the end of 1902.

Herbert Ernest Robert Pitman (25 June 1881 – 19 July 1939) was an Australian rules footballer who played with Geelong in the Victorian Football League (VFL).
