= Tom Shelley =

Australian rules footballer

Personal information
- Full name: Thomas Joseph Shelley
- Born: 12 November 1876; Geelong, Victoria
- Died: 16 March 1964 (aged 87); Geelong, Victoria
- Original team: Barwon

Playing career^{1}
Years	Club	Games (Goals)
1902	Geelong	1 (0)
- ^{1} Playing statistics correct to the end of 1902.

Thomas Joseph Shelley (12 November 1876 – 16 March 1964) was an Australian rules footballer who played with Geelong in the Victorian Football League (VFL).
