= Bert Robertson =

Australian rules footballer

Personal information
- Full name: Albert Gordon Robertson
- Born: 10 October 1880; South Yarra, Victoria
- Died: 10 January 1939 (aged 58); Chatswood, New South Wales
- Original team: South Yarra

Playing career^{1}
Years	Club	Games (Goals)
1901	St Kilda	2 (1)
- ^{1} Playing statistics correct to the end of 1901.

Albert Gordon Robertson (10 October 1880 – 10 January 1939) was an Australian rules footballer who played for the St Kilda Football Club in the Victorian Football League (VFL).
