= Paddy Rowan =

Australian rules footballer

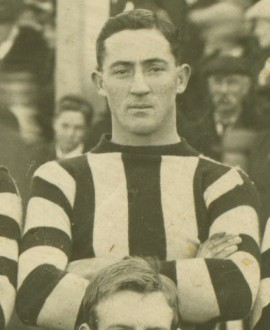
- "Paddy Rowan" in 1912

Personal information
- Full name: Percy Edward Rowe
- Born: 28 May 1889; St Arnaud, Victoria
- Died: 5 December 1916 (aged 27); Somme, France
- Original team: South Bendigo (BFL)
- Height: 179 cm (5 ft 10 in)
- Weight: 78 kg (172 lb)

Playing career^{1}
Years	Club	Games (Goals)
1911–1915	Collingwood	82 (28)
- ^{1} Playing statistics correct to the end of 1915.

Percy Edward Rowe (28 May 1889 – 5 December 1916), known as Paddy Rowan, was an Australian rules footballer who played with Collingwood in the Victorian Football League.

== Sporting career ==
=== Boxing ===
Rowe, who boxed under the name of Paddy Rowan, was the Victorian amateur champion lightweight boxer, who turned professional in 1910. He was still boxing when in the First AIF.

=== Australian rules football ===
Although his real name was Percy Rowe he was known at Collingwood as Paddy Rowan, an alias that had originated from his boxing career. The reason for the name change was that he could not play for Collingwood in 1911 because he had already played with the South Bendigo Football Club in the Bendigo Football League that year.

To allow Rowan to play, Collingwood registered him under the assumed name of Paddy Rowan.

Coincidentally another individual, unrelated to Rowe/Rowan, but also named Percy Rowe (1896-1976) played 96 games for Collingwood during the 1920s. Additionally, Rowan's son, also Percy Rowe, played for the Collingwood Second XVIII.

Rowan played in two losing Grand Finals, the first from the back pocket in his debut season; the other as a half forward flanker in 1915. Rowan, who was in training with the army while at Collingwood, had completed a 10-mile route march on the morning of the 1915 Grand Final but still took the field.

Paddy Rowan was one of the outstanding players of his time.
I feel sure that had he been spared to return from the war, he would have gone down in football as one of the game's greatest exponents.
There was no phase of it in which he did not excel.
A strong, virile follower, he could, with equal effectiveness, play centre half-back or centre half-forward.
Paddy possessed the determination and courage of two men.
(Former Collingwood teammate Dan Minogue, in 1937.)

== Military service ==
Rowan enlisted in the First Australian Imperial Force (AIF) in July 1915. He died from shrapnel wounds receive in action at the Battle of the Somme on 5 December 1916.

== Personal life ==
Rowan married Louisa Marion Newby in 1915; and they had a son, Percy, born on 1 May 1916.

== See also ==
- List of Victorian Football League players who died on active service
