= William Mahoney (footballer) =

Australian rules footballer

Billy Mahoney
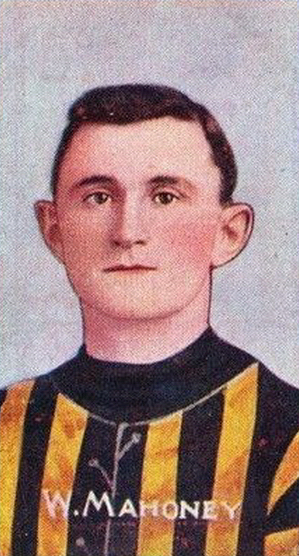
- Cigarette card of Mahoney in 1910

Personal information
- Full name: William James Mahoney
- Born: 1 January 1885; Geelong, Victoria
- Died: 26 November 1939 (aged 54); Hawthorn, Victoria
- Original team: Barwon Juniors
- Height: 170 cm (5 ft 7 in)
- Weight: 67 kg (148 lb)

Playing career^{1}
Years	Club	Games (Goals)
1902	Geelong	17 (11)
1904–1905	St Kilda	17 (9)
1908–11,1913-15,1920	Richmond	114 (53)
Total		148 (73)
- ^{1} Playing statistics correct to the end of 1920.

William Mahoney (1 January 1885 – 26 November 1939) was an Australian rules footballer who played for the Geelong Football Club in the VFL in 1902 and for the St Kilda Football Club between 1904 and 1905. He then played for the Richmond Football Club in the VFA in 1906 and 1907 then in the VFL on and off between 1908 and 1920.
