= Alfred Richardson (cricketer) =

English cricketer and schoolmaster

Personal information
- Full name: Alfred Graham Richardson
- Born: 24 July 1874; Sandy, Bedfordshire, England
- Died: 17 December 1934 (aged 60); Mthatha, Cape Province, South Africa
- Batting: Right-handed
- Role: Batsman

Domestic team information
- Years: Team
- 1895: Somerset
- 1895–97: Cambridge University
- 1897–1901: Gloucestershire
- 1906/07–1913/14: Orange Free State
- First-class debut: 13 May 1895 Somerset v Cambridge University
- Last First-class: 26 January 1914 Orange Free State v Marylebone Cricket Club (MCC)

Career statistics
Competition	First-class
Matches	29
Runs scored	698
Batting average	14.85
100s/50s	–/2
Top score	89
Balls bowled	153
Wickets	2
Bowling average	56.00
5 wickets in innings	–
10 wickets in match	–
Best bowling	1/23
Catches/stumpings	10/–
- Source: CricketArchive, 15 July 2011

Alfred Graham Richardson (24 July 1874 – 17 December 1934) was an English schoolmaster and cricketer who played first-class cricket for Somerset, Cambridge University, Gloucestershire and Orange Free State between 1895 and 1913/14. He was born at Sandy, Bedfordshire and died at Umtata, now Mthatha, Cape Province, South Africa.

The fourth son of the rector of Sandy, Richardson was educated at King's School, Canterbury, and was a student at Corpus Christi College, Cambridge in 1895 when he played as a right-handed batsman in a match for Somerset against the university side. Scores of 40 and 35 led him to be picked for the university team for the next match, against a team of amateur cricketers raised by C. I. Thornton, but he was not successful and was not chosen again for the university team in 1895 or in 1896. In 1897, Richardson had a similar experience: this time, he did well as an opening batsman for Gloucestershire in a match against Kent, with scores of 40 and 17. He was then picked for another single match for the university team, this time against Marylebone Cricket Club (MCC), but in a rain-ruined game he did not get to bat, and he never appeared for the university side again. But if Cambridge University did not want his cricket skills, then Gloucestershire in 1897 did, and he appeared in 10 further first-class matches when the university term was over, often opening the batting alongside W. G. Grace. In the game against Somerset he scored 89 as an opener, and this was to be his highest first-class score.

After the 1897 season, Richardson became a schoolmaster at the Forest School, Walthamstow in north-east London and was available for first-class cricket only in school holidays. He appeared in a few games for Gloucestershire every season from 1898 to 1901 but was not successful. He moved to South Africa where he was assistant master at Grey College, Bloemfontein from 1905 to 1917. In 1906–07, he played five times for Orange Free State as an opening or middle-order batsman in a weak batting side; his highest score in these matches was 41 and he averaged just 10.70 runs. He reappeared without success in a single match in the 1913–14 season, captaining the Free State side against the MCC touring team; Morice Bird scored a double century, Sydney Barnes took 13 wickets, and MCC won the match by an innings and 374 runs. In 1917, he became headmaster of Umtata High School and remained there until his death.

According to a short obituary in The Times in January 1935, Richardson "associated himself with every form of intellectual and athletic activity and was for several years golf champion of the Orange Free State". At his funeral "crowds filled the Cathedral to overflowing".
