= Roy Adam =

Australian rules footballer

Personal information
- Full name: Robert David Adam
- Born: 11 March 1883; Bundalong, Victoria
- Died: 4 November 1958 (aged 75); Oakleigh, Victoria
- Original team: Cumloden College
- Height: 179 cm (5 ft 10 in)

Playing career^{1}
Years	Club	Games (Goals)
1901	St Kilda	2 (0)
1904–1905	Melbourne	12 (3)
Total		14 (3)
- ^{1} Playing statistics correct to the end of 1905.

Robert David "Roy" Adam (11 March 1883 – 4 November 1958) was an Australian rules footballer who played two games for St Kilda Football Club in 1901 and later returned to the Victorian Football League in 1904–1905, playing 12 games for Melbourne and kicking three goals, all in 1904.
