= Arthur Reed (Australian footballer) =

Australian rules footballer

Personal information
- Full name: Arthur James Bradley Reed
- Born: 19 July 1883; Clunes, Victoria
- Died: 1 April 1951 (aged 67); Queenscliff, Victoria
- Original team: Geelong Grammar

Playing career^{1}
Years	Club	Games (Goals)
1902	Geelong	14 (2)
- ^{1} Playing statistics correct to the end of 1902.

Arthur James Bradley Reed (19 July 1883 – 1 April 1951) was an Australian rules footballer who played for the Geelong Football Club in the Victorian Football League (VFL).
