= Bill Anderson (footballer, born 1878) =

Australian rules footballer

Personal information
- Full name: William Synnton Anderson
- Born: 1 July 1878; St Kilda, Victoria
- Died: 12 March 1915 (aged 36); Prahran, Victoria
- Original team: Balaclava

Playing career^{1}
| Years | Club | Games (Goals) |
| 1901 | St Kilda | 1 (0) |
- ^{1} Playing statistics correct to the end of 1901.

William Synnton Anderson (1 July 1878 – 12 March 1915) was an Australian rules footballer who played with the St Kilda Football Club in the Victorian Football League (VFL).
