= Lindsay Anderson (footballer) =

Australian rules footballer

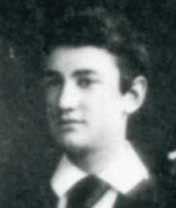

Personal information
- Full name: Lindsay Meek Anderson
- Born: 2 September 1883; St Kilda, Victoria
- Died: 12 November 1962 (aged 79); Fullarton, South Australia
- Original team: Scotch College

Playing career^{1}
Years	Club	Games (Goals)
1901–04, 1906	Melbourne	16 (3)
- ^{1} Playing statistics correct to the end of 1906.

Lindsay Meek Anderson (2 September 1883 – 12 November 1962) was an Australian rules footballer who played with Melbourne in the Victorian Football League (VFL).
