= Fred Cronin =

Australian rules footballer

Personal information
- Full name: Fred Cronin
- Born: 16 September 1882; Golden Square, Victoria
- Died: 4 June 1964 (aged 81); Golden Square, Victoria
- Original team: Marylebone

Playing career^{1}
Years	Club	Games (Goals)
1902–03	Geelong	7 (1)
- ^{1} Playing statistics correct to the end of 1903.

Fred Cronin (16 September 1882 – 4 June 1964) was an Australian rules footballer who played with Geelong in the Victorian Football League (VFL).
