= Sam Gray (footballer, born 1880) =

Australian rules footballer

Personal information
- Full name: Sam Gray
- Born: 1 August 1880
- Died: 25 April 1944 (aged 63)
- Original team: Melbourne Juniors

Playing career^{1}
Years	Club	Games (Goals)
1901	St Kilda	1 (0)
- ^{1} Playing statistics correct to the end of 1901.

Sam Gray (1 August 1880 – 25 April 1944) was an Australian rules footballer who played with St Kilda in the Victorian Football League (VFL).
