= Tom McLean (footballer, born 1876) =

Australian rules footballer

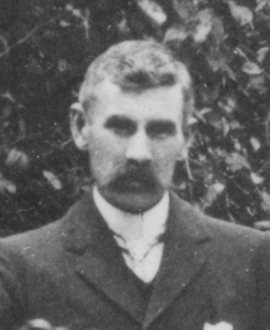
- McLean in 1900

Personal information
- Full name: Thomas Alexander McLean
- Born: 7 July 1876; Bright, Victoria
- Died: 14 August 1948 (aged 72); Traralgon, Victoria
- Original team: Queens College
- Height: 180 cm (5 ft 11 in)
- Weight: 82 kg (181 lb)

Playing career^{1}
Years	Club	Games (Goals)
1900	Collingwood	5 (3)
1902–04	Geelong	12 (0)
Total		17 (3)
- ^{1} Playing statistics correct to the end of 1904.

Thomas Alexander McLean (7 July 1876 – 14 August 1948) was an Australian rules footballer who played with Collingwood and Geelong in the Victorian Football League (VFL).

He played VFL football with Geelong while studying to become a doctor and while a resident doctor at Geelong Hospital, before commencing private practice in Traralgon.

McLean played for Traralgon in 1905 and 1906 and would later become President of the Traralgon Football Club.

McLean also played 11 first eleven games of Premier Cricket with the University Cricket Club.
