= Jack Wright (footballer) =

Australian rules footballer

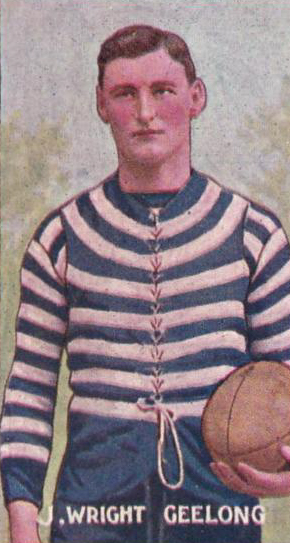
- Cigarette card of Wright in 1906

Personal information
- Full name: John Thomas Wright
- Born: 4 May 1878; Mansfield, Victoria
- Died: 11 June 1968 (aged 90); Preston, Victoria
- Original team: Queenscliff Garrison
- Position: Fullback

Playing career^{1}
Years	Club	Games (Goals)
1902–06	Geelong	53 (8)
- ^{1} Playing statistics correct to the end of 1906.

John Thomas Wright (4 May 1878 – 11 June 1968) was an Australian rules footballer who played with Geelong in the Victorian Football League (VFL).

== Family ==
The son of Isaiah 'Wild' Wright (1849–1911) who famously fought Ned Kelly in a bare knuckle fight at Beechworth on 8 August 1874, and Bridget Wright, née Lloyd (1855–1884), John Thomas Wright was born at Mansfield, Victoria on 4 May 1878.
