= Henry Pinniger =

Australian rules footballer

Personal information
- Full name: Henry William Norton Pinniger
- Born: 3 August 1872; Ballarat East, Victoria
- Died: 6 January 1953 (aged 80); Bellingen, New South Wales

Playing career^{1}
Years	Club	Games (Goals)
1901–02	St Kilda	12 (0)
- ^{1} Playing statistics correct to the end of 1902.

Henry William Norton Pinniger (3 August 1872 – 6 January 1953) was an Australian rules footballer who played with St Kilda in the Victorian Football League (VFL).
