= Harry Pye (footballer) =

Australian rules footballer

Personal information
- Full name: Harry Coupar Pye
- Born: 10 August 1880; Carlton, Victoria
- Died: 13 March 1953 (aged 72); St Kilda, Victoria
- Original team: St Luke's

Playing career^{1}
Years	Club	Games (Goals)
1901–02	Carlton	16 (1)
- ^{1} Playing statistics correct to the end of 1902.

Harry Coupar Pye (10 August 1880 – 13 March 1953) was an Australian rules footballer who played with Carlton in the Victorian Football League (VFL).

== Family ==
He married twice. He married his first wife, Minnie Brown (-1950), on 8 January 1908. They had two children. He married his second wife, Priscilla Humerston (1890-1968), in 1951, and became stepfather to her daughter.

== Football ==
=== Carlton (VFL) ===
Recruited from a local church team, St Lukes, Pye played a total of 16 senior games for Carlton over two seasons: 14 games in 1901, and 2 games in 1902. He played in the first two matches in 1902 under new coach Jack Worrall, and then left the club — in round 3, Worrall made 8 changes (including new players) to the previous week's team, in which Pye had played his final match.

=== Brighton (VFA) ===
He was cleared from Carlton to Brighton Football Club in the Victorian Football Association (VFA) on 30 April 1906.

== Death ==
He died at his residence in St Kilda on 13 March 1953.
