= Ern Batty =

Australian rules footballer

Personal information
- Full name: Alfred Ernest Batty
- Born: 20 September 1879; Beeac, Victoria
- Died: 19 December 1970 (aged 91); Geelong, Victoria
- Original team: Barwon

Playing career^{1}
| Years | Club | Games (Goals) |
| 1902 | Geelong | 9 (1) |
- ^{1} Playing statistics correct to the end of 1902.

Alfred Ernest Batty (20 September 1879 – 19 December 1970) was an Australian rules footballer who played with Geelong in the Victorian Football League (VFL).
