= John Hurley (footballer) =

Australian rules footballer

Personal information
- Full name: John Hurley
- Born: 19 January 1884; Geelong, Victoria
- Died: 10 July 1972 (aged 88); Kew East, Victoria

Playing career^{1}
Years	Club	Games (Goals)
1902	Geelong	3 (1)
- ^{1} Playing statistics correct to the end of 1902.

John Hurley (19 January 1884 – 10 July 1972) was an Australian rules footballer who played with Geelong in the Victorian Football League (VFL).
