= Ern Aurish =

Australian rules footballer

Personal information
- Full name: Ernest Benjamin Aurish
- Born: 9 August 1878; Blackwood, Victoria
- Died: 8 October 1950 (aged 72); Chelsea, Victoria
- Original team: Trentham

Playing career^{1}
Years	Club	Games (Goals)
1901	St Kilda	1 (0)
- ^{1} Playing statistics correct to the end of 1901.

Ernest Benjamin Aurish (9 August 1878 – 8 October 1950) was an Australian rules footballer who played with St Kilda in the Victorian Football League (VFL).
