= David Jack (musician) =

American children's musician

David Jack (born January 20, 1960, in Bristol, Pennsylvania) is an American children's performer, composer, pianist and tap dancer.

== Biography ==
Jack is a Parents' Choice Award-winning composer and performer of children's music. He has appeared on television and radio and frequently entertains at children's music festivals throughout the United States. In 1991, he performed at the Mandell Theater in Drexel University located in Philadelphia, Pennsylvania in a show entitled "Makin Music, Makin Friends" which was named after a song of the same name. It was also released on home video the same year.

He is best known for his eleven years of daily performances at Sesame Place, during which he performed live on stage with Big Bird and other Sesame Street characters in shows such as "David Jack's Jungle Adventures" and "Gotta Dance" that featured several of his songs.

Jack is also the founder of SchoolAssemblies Brands, a company based in Perkasie, Pennsylvania that provides curriculum-based school assembly programs to elementary schools across the country. One of his assembly programs include "David Jack The Spirit Of America" in which the goal is to teach children about patriotism and the importance of the armed forces, while also including singing and audience participation.

Starting in July 2025, Jack uploaded new music videos of some of his past songs including "Walkin Through The Jungle" and "Hasta Luego" which he usually wrapped up his shows with. He returned to Sesame Place for the first time in twenty years on June 27-28 2026 with his Panda Banda band performing old favorites.
