= George Ashman (footballer, born 1929) =

Australian rules footballer

Personal information
- Full name: George E. Ashman
- Born: 24 August 1929
- Died: 27 March 2015 (aged 85)
- Original team: Fitzroy All-Youth Club
- Height: 183 cm (6 ft 0 in)
- Weight: 84 kg (185 lb)

Playing career^{1}
Years	Club	Games (Goals)
1952–53	Fitzroy	5 (0)
- ^{1} Playing statistics correct to the end of 1953.

George E. Ashman (24 August 1929 – 27 March 2015) was an Australian rules footballer who played with Fitzroy in the Victorian Football League (VFL).
