= Tim Murphy (Australian footballer) =

Australian rules footballer

Personal information
- Full name: Timothy John Murphy
- Born: 22 July 1878; South Melbourne, Victoria
- Died: 1 January 1902 (aged 23); Mildura, Victoria
- Original team: St Ignatius

Playing career^{1}
Years	Club	Games (Goals)
1901	St Kilda	1 (0)
- ^{1} Playing statistics correct to the end of 1901.

Timothy John Murphy (22 July 1878 – 1 January 1902) was an Australian rules footballer who played with St Kilda in the Victorian Football League (VFL).

He was appointed as a police constable in April 1901 and played one game for St Kilda before being posted to Mildura. Later that year he contracted typhoid fever and he died in Mildura on New Year's Day in 1902.
