= Arthur Dummett =

Australian cricketer

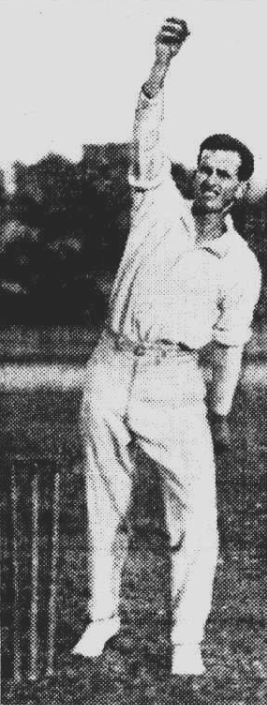

Personal information
- Full name: Arthur William Dummett
- Born: 18 November 1900; Melbourne, Australia
- Died: 4 June 1968 (aged 67); Ivanhoe, Victoria

Domestic team information
- Years: Team
- 1922: Victoria
- Source: Cricinfo, 20 November 2015

Arthur Dummett (18 November 1900 – 4 June 1968) was an Australian cricketer. He played one first-class cricket match for Victoria in 1922.

== Family ==
The son of Henry Peter James Dummett (1857-1921), and Jessie Adeline Dummett (1856-1928), née Rouse, Arthur William Dummett was born in Melbourne on 18 November 1900.

He was the brother of Collingwood footballers Alf Dummett (1880-1955), and Charlie Dummett (1891-1976), and the father of Richmond footballer Bob Dummett.

He married Lillian Lee in 1922. They were divorced in 1934.

He married Annie Rimes in 1937. Their daughter, Joy, died in her infancy, aged 2.

He died, at Ivanhoe, on 4 June 1968.

== See also ==
- List of Victoria first-class cricketers
