= Alf Dummett =

Australian rules footballer

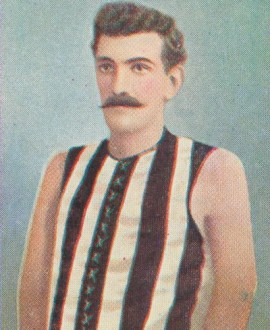
- Dummett during his career with Collingwood

Personal information
- Full name: Alfred Edwin Gay Dummett
- Born: 8 December 1880; Fitzroy, Victoria
- Died: 1 May 1955 (aged 74); Parkville, Victoria
- Original team: Collingwood Juniors
- Debut: Round 1, 1901, Collingwood vs. Essendon, at East Melbourne

Playing career^{1}
| Years | Club | Games (Goals) |
| 1901–1910 | Collingwood | 118 (10) |
- ^{1} Playing statistics correct to the end of 1910.

Career highlights
- 2× VFL premiership player: 1902, 1903; Collingwood captain: 1906

Alfred Edwin Gay "Rosie" Dummett (8 December 1880 – 1 May 1955) was an Australian rules footballer who played for the Collingwood Football Club in the VFL during the early 1900s.

== Family ==
The son of Henry Peter James Dummett (1857–1921), and Jessie Adeline Dummett (1856–1928), née Rouse, and known as "Rosie" due to his rosy red cheeks, Alf Dummett was born in Fitzroy on 8 December 1880.

He was the brother of Collingwood footballer Charlie Dummett (1891–1976), the brother of Victorian cricketer Arthur Dummett (1900–1968), and the uncle of Richmond footballer Bob Dummett.

== Football ==
Dummett, a defender, was recruited locally to Collingwood.

He was a member of Collingwood's 1902 and 1903 premiership teams and captained the club for part of the 1906 season.

== After football ==
After his playing career ended he served as the Vice President of the Collingwood Football Club.

He also served as Collingwood's delegate to the Victorian Football League for 30 years; and, in addition, served as the Victorian chairman of selectors from 1936 to 1952.

== Death ==
He died in Parkville, Victoria on 1 May 1955.
