= Bert Hall (footballer, born 1880) =

Australian rules footballer

Personal information
- Full name: Albert Henry Hall
- Born: 24 August 1880; Geelong, Victoria
- Died: 9 February 1968 (aged 87); Brisbane, Queensland

Playing career^{1}
| Years | Club | Games (Goals) |
| 1902 | Geelong | 1 (1) |
- ^{1} Playing statistics correct to the end of 1902.

Albert Henry Hall (24 August 1880 – 9 February 1968) was an Australian rules footballer who played for the Geelong Football Club in the Victorian Football League (VFL).
