= Alec McKenzie =

Australian rules footballer (1882–1968)

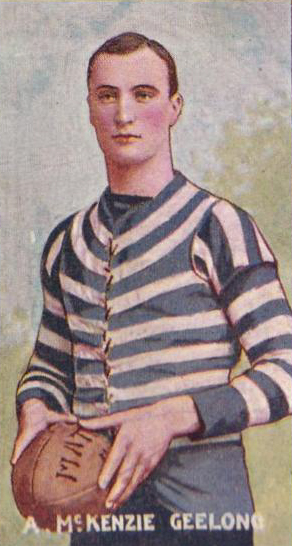
- Cigarette card of McKenzie in 1906

Personal information
- Full name: Alexander McKenzie
- Born: 4 July 1882; Warrnambool, Victoria
- Died: 27 May 1968 (aged 85); Malvern East, Victoria
- Original team: Warrnambool

Playing career^{1}
Years	Club	Games (Goals)
1902–1908	Geelong	87 (18)
- ^{1} Playing statistics correct to the end of 1908.

Alec McKenzie (4 July 1882 – 27 May 1968) was an Australian rules footballer who played for the Geelong Football Club in the Victorian Football League (VFL).
