= Ben Sandford (footballer) =

Australian rules footballer

Personal information
- Full name: Albert Edward Sandford
- Born: 14 November 1877; Lara, Victoria
- Died: 26 June 1942 (aged 64); Hamilton, Victoria

Playing career^{1}
Years	Club	Games (Goals)
1901–1903	St Kilda	31 (5)
- ^{1} Playing statistics correct to the end of 1903.

Albert Edward "Ben" Sandford (14 November 1877 – 26 June 1942) was an Australian rules footballer who played for the St Kilda Football Club in the Victorian Football League (VFL).
