= Bob Rinder =

Australian rules footballer

Personal information
- Full name: Robert William Rinder
- Born: 8 December 1878; Inglewood, Victoria
- Died: 13 June 1956 (aged 77); Inglewood, Victoria
- Original team: Kerang

Playing career^{1}
Years	Club	Games (Goals)
1901	St Kilda	3 (0)
- ^{1} Playing statistics correct to the end of 1901.

Robert William Rinder (8 December 1878 – 13 June 1956) was an Australian rules footballer who played with St Kilda in the Victorian Football League (VFL).
