= Bob Kerr (Australian footballer) =

Australian rules footballer

Personal information
- Full name: Robert Alexander Kerr
- Born: 1 May 1875; Melbourne, Victoria
- Died: 1 June 1943 (aged 68); Geelong, Victoria

Playing career^{1}
| Years | Club | Games (Goals) |
| 1902–03 | Geelong | 5 (1) |
- ^{1} Playing statistics correct to the end of 1903.

Robert Alexander Kerr (1 May 1875 – 1 June 1943) was an Australian rules footballer who played with Geelong in the Victorian Football League (VFL).
