= Tom Robertson (Australian footballer) =

Australian rules footballer

Personal information
- Full name: Thomas Arthur Robertson
- Born: 2 November 1876; North Melbourne, Victoria
- Died: 24 July 1942 (aged 65); Chelsea, Victoria
- Original team: Brunswick (VFA)

Playing career^{1}
Years	Club	Games (Goals)
1901–02	St Kilda	27 (7)
- ^{1} Playing statistics correct to the end of 1902.

Thomas Arthur Robertson (2 November 1876 – 24 July 1942) was an Australian rules footballer who played with St Kilda in the Victorian Football League (VFL).
