= Simon Roberts (footballer) =

Australian rules footballer

Personal information
- Full name: Simon Roberts
- Born: 12 December 1876; Brunswick, Victoria
- Died: 28 November 1908 (aged 31); Coburg, Victoria
- Original team: Coburg Juniors

Playing career^{1}
Years	Club	Games (Goals)
1901	Carlton	3 (0)
- ^{1} Playing statistics correct to the end of 1901.

Simon Roberts (12 December 1876 – 28 November 1908) was an Australian rules footballer who played with Carlton in the Victorian Football League (VFL).
