= Matt Paternoster =

Australian rules footballer

Personal information
- Full name: Matthew Paternoster
- Born: 14 April 1880; Berwick, Victoria
- Died: 19 April 1962 (aged 82); Cooma, New South Wales
- Original team: Richmond (VFA)

Playing career^{1}
Years	Club	Games (Goals)
1901	Fitzroy	12 (4)
- ^{1} Playing statistics correct to the end of 1901.

Matthew Paternoster (14 April 1880 – 19 April 1962) was an Australian rules footballer who played with Fitzroy.

He was the brother of Jim Paternoster and they were recruited from Richmond at the same time but Matthew never made a senior appearance for Richmond.

== Sources ==
- Matt Paternoster's playing statistics from AFL Tables
- Matt Paternoster at AustralianFootball.com
