= David Jacks (footballer) =

Australian rules footballer

Personal information
- Full name: David Jacks
- Born: 24 May 1948 (age 78)
- Height: 185 cm (6 ft 1 in)
- Weight: 83 kg (183 lb)
- Position: Half forward

Playing career^{1}
Years	Club	Games (Goals)
1967	Richmond	1 (0)
- ^{1} Playing statistics correct to the end of 1967.

David Jacks (born 24 May 1948) is a former Australian rules footballer who played with Richmond in the Victorian Football League (VFL).
