= Bill O'Hara (footballer, born 1880) =

Australian rules footballer

Personal information
- Full name: Joseph William O'Hara
- Born: 27 July 1880; Yinnar, Victoria
- Died: 12 November 1946 (aged 66); Morwell, Victoria

Playing career^{1}
Years	Club	Games (Goals)
1901	South Melbourne	5 (2)
- ^{1} Playing statistics correct to the end of 1901.

Joseph William O'Hara (27 July 1880 – 12 November 1946) was an Australian rules footballer who played with South Melbourne in the Victorian Football League (VFL).
