= Bill Moodie =

Australian rules footballer

Personal information
- Full name: William Cameron Moodie
- Born: 24 October 1879; Geelong, Victoria
- Died: 15 July 1918 (aged 38); Geelong, Victoria
- Original team: Geelong West

Playing career^{1}
Years	Club	Games (Goals)
1900	South Melbourne	5 (0)
1901	Geelong	4 (6)
Total		9 (6)
- ^{1} Playing statistics correct to the end of 1901.

William Cameron Moodie (24 October 1879 – 15 July 1918) was an Australian rules footballer who played with South Melbourne and Geelong in the Victorian Football League (VFL).
