= Johnny Jackson (Australian footballer) =

Australian rules footballer

Personal information
- Full name: John Jackson
- Born: 9 February 1879; Carlton, Victoria
- Died: 6 April 1939 (aged 60); Hampton, Victoria
- Original team: Port Melbourne (VFA)
- Height: 188 cm (6 ft 2 in)
- Weight: 89 kg (196 lb)

Playing career^{1}
Years	Club	Games (Goals)
1901-1902, 1907	South Melbourne	15 (3)
- ^{1} Playing statistics correct to the end of 1907.

Johnny Jackson (9 February 1879 – 6 April 1939) was an Australian rules footballer who played with South Melbourne in the Victorian Football League (VFL) and Port Melbourne in the (Victorian Football Association (VFA).

== Family ==
The son of William Jackson (1846–1900), and Emma Jackson (1848–1909), née Eccles, John Jackson was born in Carlton, Victoria on 9 February 1879.

== Death ==
He died at Hampton, Victoria on 6 April 1939.
