= Charlie Dummett =

Australian rules footballer and goal umpire

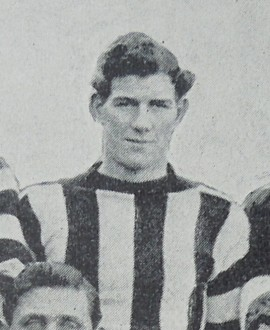
- Dummett in 1909

Personal information
- Full name: Herbert Charles Dummett
- Born: 9 January 1891; Brunswick, Victoria
- Died: 4 May 1976 (aged 85); Kew, Victoria
- Original team: Rose of Northcote

Playing career^{1}
Years	Club	Games (Goals)
1909, 1911	Collingwood	4 (3)
- ^{1} Playing statistics correct to the end of 1911.

Herbert Charles Dummett (9 January 1891 – 4 May 1976) was an Australian rules footballer who played with Collingwood in the Victorian Football League (VFL).

== Family ==
The son of Henry Peter James Dummett (1857–1921), and Jessie Adeline Dummett (1856–1928), née Rouse, Charlie Dummett was born in Brunswick on 9 January 1891.

He was the brother of Collingwood footballer Alf Dummett, and of Victorian cricketer Arthur Dummett (1900–1968).

He married Amy Dorothy Bertram (1895–1974) in 1916.

== Footballer ==
Dummett made three appearances for Collingwood in the 1909 VFL season, as an 18-year-old. He did not play at all in 1910, a Collingwood premiership season; and in 1911 he played just one senior game.

Although his brother, Alf Dummett, was also at Collingwood at that time, they never played together.

== Goal umpire ==
From 1927 to 1945, Dummett goal umpired 264 VFL matches, the most ever by a former player. He officiated in the 1933 and 1943 VFL Grand Finals.

== Death ==
He died on 4 May 1976.
