= Bert Sharpe =

Australian rules footballer

Personal information
- Full name: Albert Edward Sharpe
- Born: 6 May 1878; Fitzroy, Victoria
- Died: 10 January 1918 (aged 39); Carlton North, Victoria
- Original team: Royal Park Crescent
- Position: Forward

Playing career^{1}
Years	Club	Games (Goals)
1897–1903	Fitzroy	99 (59)
1904–1905	South Melbourne	17 (17)
Total		116 (76)
- ^{1} Playing statistics correct to the end of 1905.

Career highlights
- VFL premiership player: 1898

Albert 'Bert' Sharpe (6 May 1878 – 10 January 1918) was an Australian rules footballer who played for the Fitzroy Football Club and South Melbourne Football Club in the Victorian Football League (VFL).

Sharpe was a key position forward but could also play as a defender when required. He played at centre half-forward in the 1898 Fitzroy premiership side and went on to play 99 games for the club; some sources credit him as having played in Fitzroy's 1899 premiership team, thus making 100 Fitzroy appearances, but he was a late withdrawal from the side due to the death of his father the day before the Grand Final; his teammates wore black armbands for that match. He still brought up the 100 game milestone as he continued his career at South Melbourne in 1904.

He died young in 1918.
