= George Saxbee =

Australian rules footballer

Personal information
- Full name: George Thomas Saxbee
- Born: 5 August 1881; Geelong, Victoria
- Died: 23 January 1936 (aged 54); Coolgardie, Western Australia
- Original team: East Geelong (GDFL)

Playing career^{1}
Years	Club	Games (Goals)
1901	Geelong	1 (0)
- ^{1} Playing statistics correct to the end of 1901.

George Thomas Saxbee (5 August 1881 – 23 January 1936) was an Australian rules footballer who played with Geelong in the Victorian Football League (VFL).
