= Paul Cullen (footballer) =

Australian rules footballer

Personal information
- Full name: Paul George Cullen
- Born: 13 July 1882; Ararat, Victoria
- Died: 18 June 1950 (aged 67); Black Rock, Victoria
- Original team: Leopold (MJFA)

Playing career^{1}
Years	Club	Games (Goals)
1901	South Melbourne	1 (0)
- ^{1} Playing statistics correct to the end of 1901.

Paul George Cullen (13 July 1882 – 18 June 1950) was an Australian rules footballer who played with South Melbourne in the Victorian Football League (VFL).
