= 1901 VFL season =

Fifth season of the Victorian Football League (VFL)

1901 VFL premiership season
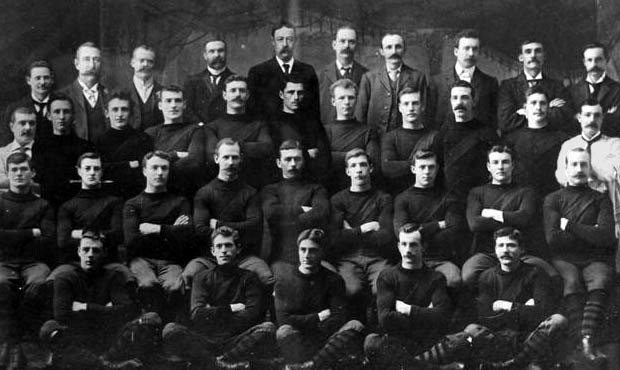
- Essendon 1901 VFL premiership team
- Date: 4 May – 7 September 1901
- Teams: 8
- Premiers: Essendon; 2nd premiership
- Minor premiers: Geelong; 2nd minor premiership
- Leading goalkicker medallist: Fred Hiskins (Essendon); 34 goals
- Matches played: 71

The 1901 VFL season was the fifth season of the Victorian Football League (VFL), the highest-level senior Australian rules football competition in Victoria. The season featured eight clubs and ran from 4 May to 7 September, comprising a 17-round home-and-away season followed by a two-week finals series featuring the top four clubs.

Essendon won the premiership, defeating Collingwood by 27 points in the 1901 VFL grand final; it was Essendon's second VFL premiership. Geelong won the minor premiership by finishing atop the home-and-away ladder with a 14–3 win–loss record, but was eliminated by Collingwood in the semi-finals. Essendon's Fred Hiskins won the leading goalkicker medal as the league's leading goalkicker.

== Background ==
In 1901, the VFL competition consisted of eight teams of 18 on-the-field players each, with no "reserves", although any of the 18 players who had left the playing field for any reason could later resume their place on the field at any time during the match.

Each team played each other twice in a home-and-away season of 14 rounds. Then, based on ladder positions after those 14 rounds, three further 'sectional rounds' were played, with the teams ranked 1st, 3rd, 5th and 7th playing in one section and the teams ranked 2nd, 4th, 6th and 8th playing in the other.

Once the 17 rounds of the home-and-away season had finished, the 1901 VFL Premiers were determined by the specific format and conventions of the original Argus system.

== Home-and-away season ==
=== Round 1 ===
	Round 1
Saturday, 4 May (3:00 pm)	Fitzroy 8.13 (61)	def.	Carlton 2.7 (19)	Brunswick Street Oval
Saturday, 4 May (3:00 pm)	Essendon 1.15 (21)	def. by	Collingwood 9.10 (64)	East Melbourne Cricket Ground
Saturday, 4 May (3:00 pm)	Geelong 2.11 (23)	def.	Melbourne 3.3 (21)	Corio Oval
Saturday, 4 May (3:00 pm)	St Kilda 6.5 (41)	def. by	South Melbourne 6.13 (49)	Junction Oval

=== Round 2 ===
	Round 2
Thursday, 9 May (3:00 pm)	Collingwood 13.16 (94)	def.	Carlton 0.7 (7)	Victoria Park
Thursday, 9 May (3:00 pm)	St Kilda 3.1 (19)	def. by	Essendon 9.14 (68)	Junction Oval
Thursday, 9 May (3:00 pm)	Fitzroy 5.8 (38)	def. by	Geelong 6.12 (48)	Brunswick Street Oval
Thursday, 9 May (3:00 pm)	Melbourne 5.6 (36)	def. by	South Melbourne 5.10 (40)	Melbourne Cricket Ground

=== Round 3 ===
	Round 3
Saturday, 11 May (3:00 pm)	Carlton 3.8 (26)	def. by	Geelong 7.13 (55)	Princes Park
Saturday, 11 May (3:00 pm)	South Melbourne 9.4 (58)	def.	Collingwood 6.11 (47)	Lake Oval
Saturday, 11 May (3:00 pm)	Essendon 6.8 (44)	def. by	Fitzroy 7.5 (47)	East Melbourne Cricket Ground
Saturday, 11 May (3:00 pm)	Melbourne 7.16 (58)	def.	St Kilda 3.3 (21)	Melbourne Cricket Ground

=== Round 4 ===
	Round 4
Saturday, 18 May (3:00 pm)	Carlton 4.3 (27)	def.	South Melbourne 3.7 (25)	Princes Park
Saturday, 18 May (3:00 pm)	Collingwood 6.8 (44)	def.	Melbourne 3.4 (22)	Victoria Park
Saturday, 18 May (3:00 pm)	Geelong 4.10 (34)	def.	Essendon 4.6 (30)	Corio Oval
Saturday, 18 May (3:00 pm)	Fitzroy 15.16 (106)	def.	St Kilda 3.5 (23)	Brunswick Street Oval

=== Round 5 ===
	Round 5
Saturday, 25 May (3:00 pm)	Essendon 7.8 (50)	def.	Melbourne 3.6 (24)	EMCG
Saturday, 25 May (3:00 pm)	Carlton 5.10 (40)	def.	St Kilda 2.8 (20)	Princes Park
Saturday, 25 May (3:00 pm)	South Melbourne 3.7 (25)	def. by	Fitzroy 6.5 (41)	Lake Oval
Saturday, 25 May (3:00 pm)	Geelong 3.6 (24)	def. by	Collingwood 4.8 (32)	Corio Oval

=== Round 6 ===
	Round 6
Saturday, 1 June (3:00 pm)	Collingwood 7.13 (55)	def.	Fitzroy 6.9 (45)	Victoria Park
Saturday, 1 June (3:00 pm)	St Kilda 2.5 (17)	def. by	Geelong 11.12 (78)	Junction Oval
Saturday, 1 June (3:00 pm)	South Melbourne 5.5 (35)	def. by	Essendon 3.23 (41)	Lake Oval
Saturday, 1 June (3:00 pm)	Melbourne 7.7 (49)	def.	Carlton 5.4 (34)	MCG

=== Round 7 ===
	Round 7
Monday, 3 June (3:00 pm)	Geelong 9.11 (65)	def.	South Melbourne 3.4 (22)	Corio Oval
Monday, 3 June (3:00 pm)	Fitzroy 5.6 (36)	drew with	Melbourne 5.6 (36)	Brunswick Street Oval
Monday, 3 June (3:00 pm)	St Kilda 3.1 (19)	def. by	Collingwood 7.11 (53)	Junction Oval
Monday, 3 June (3:00 pm)	Essendon 15.15 (105)	def.	Carlton 3.7 (25)	EMCG

=== Round 8 ===
	Round 8
Saturday, 8 June (3:00 pm)	Collingwood 7.7 (49)	def.	Essendon 7.6 (48)	Victoria Park
Saturday, 8 June (3:00 pm)	Carlton 5.7 (37)	def. by	Fitzroy 6.8 (44)	Princes Park
Saturday, 8 June (3:00 pm)	South Melbourne 7.14 (56)	def.	St Kilda 1.1 (7)	Lake Oval
Saturday, 8 June (3:00 pm)	Melbourne 7.4 (46)	def. by	Geelong 9.5 (59)	MCG

=== Round 9 ===
	Round 9
Saturday, 22 June (3:00 pm)	Essendon 19.22 (136)	def.	St Kilda 4.5 (29)	EMCG
Saturday, 22 June (3:00 pm)	Carlton 6.6 (42)	def. by	Collingwood 9.9 (63)	Princes Park
Saturday, 22 June (3:00 pm)	South Melbourne 6.9 (45)	def. by	Melbourne 9.7 (61)	Lake Oval
Saturday, 22 June (3:00 pm)	Geelong 6.16 (52)	def.	Fitzroy 8.3 (51)	Corio Oval

=== Round 10 ===
	Round 10
Saturday, 29 June (3:00 pm)	Collingwood 5.1 (31)	def. by	South Melbourne 7.9 (51)	Victoria Park
Saturday, 29 June (3:00 pm)	St Kilda 4.4 (28)	def. by	Melbourne 4.14 (38)	Junction Oval
Saturday, 29 June (3:00 pm)	Fitzroy 6.8 (44)	def. by	Essendon 14.8 (92)	Brunswick Street Oval
Saturday, 29 June (3:00 pm)	Geelong 8.15 (63)	def.	Carlton 4.7 (31)	Corio Oval

=== Round 11 ===
	Round 11
Saturday, 6 July (3:00 pm)	Essendon 6.13 (49)	def.	Geelong 2.12 (24)	EMCG
Saturday, 6 July (3:00 pm)	St Kilda 4.10 (34)	def. by	Fitzroy 11.7 (73)	Junction Oval
Saturday, 6 July (3:00 pm)	Melbourne 5.6 (36)	def.	Collingwood 4.11 (35)	MCG
Saturday, 6 July (3:00 pm)	South Melbourne 10.10 (70)	def.	Carlton 3.2 (20)	Lake Oval

=== Round 12 ===
	Round 12
Saturday, 13 July (3:00 pm)	Fitzroy 9.11 (65)	def. by	South Melbourne 12.7 (79)	Brunswick Street Oval
Saturday, 13 July (3:00 pm)	Collingwood 6.5 (41)	def. by	Geelong 12.11 (83)	Victoria Park
Saturday, 13 July (3:00 pm)	Melbourne 6.6 (42)	def.	Essendon 4.9 (33)	MCG
Saturday, 13 July (3:00 pm)	St Kilda 7.8 (50)	def.	Carlton 4.8 (32)	Junction Oval

=== Round 13 ===
	Round 13
Saturday, 20 July (3:00 pm)	Geelong 8.7 (55)	def.	St Kilda 4.5 (29)	Corio Oval
Saturday, 20 July (3:00 pm)	Essendon 6.16 (52)	def.	South Melbourne 8.3 (51)	EMCG
Saturday, 20 July (3:00 pm)	Carlton 5.6 (36)	def. by	Melbourne 6.6 (42)	Princes Park
Saturday, 20 July (3:00 pm)	Fitzroy 2.7 (19)	def. by	Collingwood 3.6 (24)	Brunswick Street Oval

=== Round 14 ===
	Round 14
Saturday, 27 July (3:00 pm)	Collingwood 10.20 (80)	def.	St Kilda 1.7 (13)	Victoria Park
Saturday, 27 July (3:00 pm)	Carlton 3.2 (20)	def. by	Essendon 11.13 (79)	Princes Park
Saturday, 27 July (3:00 pm)	South Melbourne 6.9 (45)	def. by	Geelong 6.13 (49)	Lake Oval
Saturday, 27 July (3:00 pm)	Melbourne 4.5 (29)	def.	Fitzroy 2.11 (23)	MCG

=== Pre-sectional ladder ===
Section A
Section B

#	Team	P	W	L	D	PF	PA	%	Pts
1	Geelong	14	12	2	0	712	478	149.0	48
2	Collingwood	14	10	4	0	712	488	145.9	40
3	Essendon	14	9	5	0	848	507	167.3	36
4	Melbourne	14	8	5	1	540	507	106.5	34
5	South Melbourne	14	7	7	0	651	583	111.7	28
6	Fitzroy	14	6	7	1	693	597	116.1	26
7	Carlton	14	2	12	0	396	820	48.3	8
8	St Kilda	14	1	13	0	350	922	38.0	4

Rules for classification: 1. premiership points; 2. percentage; 3. points for
Source: AFL Tables

=== Round 15 (Sectional round 1) ===
	Round 15 (Sectional round 1)
Saturday, 3 August (3:00 pm)	Collingwood 6.8 (44)	def.	Melbourne 3.10 (28)	Victoria Park
Saturday, 3 August (3:00 pm)	Carlton 3.5 (25)	def. by	Geelong 6.18 (54)	Princes Park
Saturday, 3 August (3:00 pm)	South Melbourne 1.3 (9)	def. by	Essendon 10.9 (69)	Lake Oval
Saturday, 3 August (3:00 pm)	St Kilda 4.3 (27)	def. by	Fitzroy 14.15 (99)	Junction Oval

=== Round 16 (Sectional round 2) ===
	Round 16 (Sectional round 2)
Saturday, 10 August (3:00 pm)	Geelong 7.12 (54)	def.	South Melbourne 4.6 (30)	Corio Oval
Saturday, 10 August (3:00 pm)	Essendon 14.18 (102)	def.	Carlton 5.3 (33)	EMCG
Saturday, 10 August (3:00 pm)	Melbourne 19.10 (124)	def.	St Kilda 3.4 (22)	Lake Oval
Saturday, 10 August (3:00 pm)	Fitzroy 7.6 (48)	def.	Collingwood 2.6 (18)	Brunswick Street Oval

=== Round 17 (Sectional round 3) ===
	Round 17 (Sectional round 3)
Saturday, 17 August (3:00 pm)	Collingwood 20.23 (143)	def.	St Kilda 2.3 (15)	Victoria Park
Saturday, 17 August (3:00 pm)	Carlton 3.6 (24)	def. by	South Melbourne 4.13 (37)	Princes Park
Saturday, 17 August (3:00 pm)	Geelong 5.3 (33)	def. by	Essendon 9.12 (66)	Corio Oval
Saturday, 17 August (3:00 pm)	Fitzroy 4.13 (37)	def.	Melbourne 3.6 (24)	Brunswick Street Oval

== Ladder ==
(P)	Premiers
	Qualified for finals

#	Team	P	W	L	D	PF	PA	%	Pts
1	Geelong	17	14	3	0	853	597	142.9	56
2	Essendon (P)	17	12	5	0	1085	582	186.4	48
3	Collingwood	17	12	5	0	917	579	158.4	48
4	Fitzroy	17	9	7	1	877	666	131.7	38
5	Melbourne	17	9	7	1	716	610	117.4	38
6	South Melbourne	17	8	9	0	727	730	99.6	32
7	Carlton	17	2	15	0	476	1013	47.0	8
8	St Kilda	17	1	16	0	414	1288	32.1	4

Rules for classification: 1. premiership points; 2. percentage; 3. points for
Average score: 44.6
Source: AFL Tables

== Finals series ==
=== Semi-finals ===
1st Semi Final
Saturday, 31 August 1901	Collingwood	def.	Geelong	EMCG (crowd: 10,000)	Report
2.3 (15); 3.5 (23); 5.8 (38); 6.9 (45)	Q1; Q2; Q3; Final	0.2 (2); 1.3 (9); 3.4 (22); 3.6 (24)	Umpires: Gibson
Smith 2, Bryce, Morgan, Rowell, Tulloch	Goals	Bennion, Rankin, Woods

2nd Semi Final
Saturday, 31 August 1901	Essendon	def.	Fitzroy	Victoria Park (crowd: 15,000)	Report
0.1 (1); 3.2 (20); 5.7 (37); 6.10 (46)	Q1; Q2; Q3; Final	2.4 (16); 2.6 (18); 3.8 (26); 6.9 (45)	Umpires: Henry "Ivo" Crapp
Thurgood 5, Larkin	Goals	Brosnan 2, Sharp 2, Sharpe 2

=== Grand final ===
	Grand final
Saturday, 7 September 1901 (2:50 pm)	Essendon 6.7 (43)	def.	Collingwood 2.4 (16)	Lake Oval (crowd: 30,031)	Report

== Win–loss table ==
The following table can be sorted from biggest winning margin to biggest losing margin for each round. If two or more matches in a round are decided by the same margin, these margins are sorted by percentage (i.e. the lowest-scoring winning team is ranked highest and the lowest-scoring losing team is ranked lowest). Opponents are listed above the margins and home matches are in bold.

+	Win		Qualified for finals
−	Loss		Eliminated
	Draw	X	Bye

Team	Home-and-away season																	Ladder	Finals series	
Team	1	2	3	4	5	6	7	8	9	10	11	12	13	14	15	16	17	Ladder	SF	GF
Carlton	FIT −42	COL −87	**GEE** **−29**	**SM** **+2**	**STK** **+20**	MEL −15	ESS −80	**FIT** **−7**	**COL** **−21**	GEE −32	SM −50	STK −18	**MEL** **−6**	**ESS** **−59**	**GEE** **−31**	ESS −69	**SM** **−13**	7 (2–15–0)		
Collingwood	ESS +43	**CAR** **+87**	SM −11	**MEL** **+22**	GEE +8	**FIT** **+10**	STK +34	**ESS** **+1**	CAR +21	**SM** **−20**	MEL −1	**GEE** **−42**	FIT +5	**STK** **+67**	**MEL** **+16**	FIT −30	**STK** **+128**	3 (12–5–0)	GEE +21	ESS −27
Essendon	**COL** **−43**	STK +49	**FIT** **−3**	GEE −4	**MEL** **+26**	SM +6	**CAR** **+80**	COL −1	**STK** **+107**	FIT +48	**GEE** **+25**	MEL −9	**SM** **+1**	CAR +59	SM +60	**CAR** **+69**	GEE +33	2 (12–5–0)	**FIT** **+1**	**COL** **+27**
Fitzroy	**CAR** **+42**	**GEE** **−10**	ESS +3	**STK** **+83**	SM +16	COL −10	**MEL**; **0**	CAR +7	GEE −1	**ESS** **−48**	STK +39	**SM** **−14**	**COL** **−5**	MEL −6	STK +72	**COL** **+30**	**MEL** **+13**	4 (9–7–1)	ESS −1	
Geelong	**MEL** **+2**	FIT +10	CAR +29	**ESS** **+4**	**COL** **−8**	STK +61	**SM** **+43**	MEL +13	**FIT** **+1**	**CAR** **+32**	ESS −25	COL +42	**STK** **+26**	SM +4	CAR +31	**SM** **+24**	**ESS** **−33**	1 (14–3–0)	**COL** **−21**	
Melbourne	GEE −2	**SM** **−4**	**STK** **+37**	COL −22	ESS −26	**CAR** **+15**	FIT; 0	**GEE** **−13**	SM +16	STK +10	**COL** **+1**	**ESS** **+9**	CAR +6	**FIT** **+6**	COL −16	**STK** **+102**	FIT −13	5 (9–7–1)		
South Melbourne	STK +8	MEL +4	**COL** **+11**	CAR −2	**FIT** **−16**	**ESS** **−6**	GEE −43	**STK** **+49**	**MEL** **−16**	COL +20	**CAR** **+50**	FIT +14	ESS −1	**GEE** **−4**	**ESS** **−60**	GEE −24	CAR +13	6 (8–9–0)		
St Kilda	**SM** **−8**	**ESS** **−49**	MEL −37	FIT −83	CAR −20	**GEE** **−61**	**COL** **−34**	SM −49	ESS −107	**MEL** **−10**	**FIT** **−39**	**CAR** **+18**	GEE −26	COL −67	**FIT** **−72**	MEL −102	COL −128	8 (1–16–0)		

Source: AFL Tables

== Season notes ==
- Fitzroy lodged an official protest against the result of the second semi-final, which it lost against Essendon by one point, alleging that the goal umpire had erred in awarding Essendon's first goal because the ball had hit the post. Later in the week, Fitzroy withdrew its protest against the result, and the scheduling of the grand final was not affected; an inquiry later in September found that the goal umpire had made a mistake, but no change was made to the score after the finding.
- Against South Melbourne in Round 6, Essendon kicked 17 behinds between its first and second goals. Only Geelong against St Kilda in 1919 and St Kilda against Fitzroy in 1921 have beaten this unwanted record. Fred Hiskins kicked ten behinds.
- In the Round 13 match between Collingwood and Fitzroy, neither team scored in the final quarter. As of 2026, this remains the only quarter in VFL/AFL history in which no score was registered at all.
- In the last home-and-away match between South Melbourne and Geelong, field umpire Henry "Ivo" Crapp experimented with clearly calling out his decisions.
- In Essendon's grand final victory against Collingwood, Albert Thurgood kicked three of Essendon's six goals. One of his goals was scored with an 86-yard (79 m) drop-kick, and another (measured immediately after the match) was scored with a 93-yard (85 m) place-kick into a strong head wind.
- VFL instituted the original Argus system to determine the season's premiers.

== Awards ==
- The 1901 VFL Premiership team was Essendon.
- The VFL's leading goalkicker was Fred Hiskins of Essendon with 34 goals.
- St Kilda took the "wooden spoon" in 1901.

== Sources ==
- 1901 VFL season at AFL Tables
- 1901 VFL season at Australian Football
