= Jack Davie =

Australian rules footballer

Personal information
- Full name: John Davie
- Born: 5 October 1874; Geelong
- Died: 27 October 1922 (aged 48); Geelong
- Original team: Geelong West

Playing career^{1}
Years	Club	Games (Goals)
1902	Geelong	1 (0)
- ^{1} Playing statistics correct to the end of 1902.

Jack Davie (5 October 1874 – 27 October 1922) was an Australian rules footballer who played with Geelong in the Victorian Football League (VFL).
