= Percy Fletcher (footballer) =

Australian rules footballer

Personal information
- Full name: Percy Nicholson Fletcher
- Born: 20 October 1879; Geelong, Victoria
- Died: 15 July 1946 (aged 66); Geelong, Victoria
- Original team: Mercantile

Playing career^{1}
| Years | Club | Games (Goals) |
| 1901, 1903–06 | Geelong | 47 (4) |
- ^{1} Playing statistics correct to the end of 1906.

Percy Nicholson Fletcher (20 October 1879 – 15 July 1946) was an Australian rules footballer who played with Geelong in the Victorian Football League (VFL).
