= Jim Beasley (footballer) =

Australian rules footballer

Personal information
- Full name: Frederick James Beasley
- Born: 19 December 1880; Kingston, Victoria
- Died: 10 March 1964 (aged 83); Ballarat, Victoria
- Original team: Lang Lang

Playing career^{1}
Years	Club	Games (Goals)
1901	Essendon	2 (0)
1902	Geelong	7 (2)
Total		9 (2)
- ^{1} Playing statistics correct to the end of 1902.

Frederick James Beasley (19 December 1880 – 10 March 1964) was an Australian rules footballer who played with Essendon and Geelong in the Victorian Football League (VFL).
