= Alfred Richardson (footballer) =

Australian rules footballer

Personal information
- Full name: Alfred George Richardson
- Born: 31 March 1878; Geelong, Victoria
- Died: 1 December 1951 (aged 73); Coles Bay, Tasmania

Playing career^{1}
Years	Club	Games (Goals)
1900	Leopold	
1901	St Kilda	17 (2)
1904	Perth	
- ^{1} Playing statistics correct to the end of 1904.

Alfred George Richardson (31 March 1878 – 1 December 1951) was an Australian rules footballer who played for the St Kilda Football Club in the Victorian Football League (VFL).

He later played for Perth in the WAFL before moving to Hobart, where he died in 1951.
