= Don Lord (Australian footballer) =

Australian rules footballer

Personal information
- Full name: Donald Stewart Lord
- Born: 15 February 1875; Steiglitz, Victoria
- Died: 3 July 1906 (aged 31); Bendigo, Victoria

Playing career^{1}
Years	Club	Games (Goals)
1901	Geelong	2 (0)
- ^{1} Playing statistics correct to the end of 1901.

Donald Stewart Lord (15 February 1875 – 3 July 1906) was an Australian rules footballer who played with Geelong in the Victorian Football League (VFL). He died from pleurisy at the age of 31.
