= Mick English (Australian footballer) =

Australian rules footballer

Personal information
- Full name: Michael English
- Born: 17 September 1882; Melbourne, Victoria
- Died: 1 September 1937 (aged 54); Melbourne, Victoria
- Original team: Port Melbourne Juniors

Playing career^{1}
Years	Club	Games (Goals)
1902	St Kilda	15 (1)
- ^{1} Playing statistics correct to the end of 1902.

Michael English (17 September 1882 – 1 September 1937) was an Australian rules footballer who played with St Kilda in the Victorian Football League (VFL).
