= Gus Robertson =

Australian rules footballer

Personal information
- Full name: Barclay Augustus Robertson
- Born: 29 August 1883; Prahran, Victoria
- Died: 10 March 1905 (aged 21); St Kilda, Victoria

Playing career^{1}
Years	Club	Games (Goals)
1901–02	St Kilda	18 (1)
- ^{1} Playing statistics correct to the end of 1902.

Barclay Augustus Robertson (29 August 1883 – 10 March 1905) was an Australian rules footballer who played with St Kilda in the Victorian Football League (VFL).
