= George Ashman (footballer, born 1879) =

Australian rules footballer

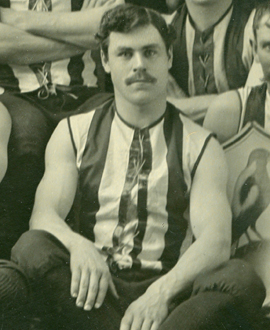
- Ashman in 1901

Personal information
- Full name: George Ashman
- Born: 29 August 1879; Collingwood, Victoria
- Died: 2 September 1947 (aged 68); Sandringham, Victoria
- Original team: Clifton Hill
- Height: 173 cm (5 ft 8 in)
- Weight: 68 kg (150 lb)

Playing career^{1}
Years	Club	Games (Goals)
1901	Collingwood	3 (1)
- ^{1} Playing statistics correct to the end of 1901.

George Ashman (29 August 1879 – 2 September 1947) was an Australian rules footballer who played with Collingwood in the Victorian Football League (VFL).
