= Edward Potter (footballer) =

Australian rules footballer

Personal information
- Full name: Edward Potter
- Born: 21 March 1878
- Died: 22 May 1960 (aged 82)

Playing career^{1}
Years	Club	Games (Goals)
1902	Geelong	6 (4)
- ^{1} Playing statistics correct to the end of 1902.

Edward "Ted" Potter (21 March 1878 – 22 May 1960) was an Australian rules footballer who played with Geelong in the Victorian Football League (VFL).
