= Alf Boyack =

Australian rules footballer

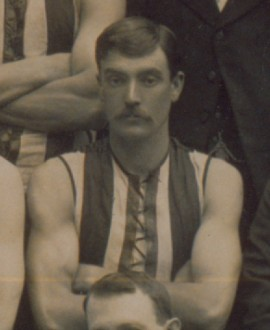
- Boyack in 1902

Personal information
- Full name: Alfred Boyack
- Born: 5 September 1877; South Melbourne, Victoria
- Died: 24 October 1947 (aged 70); Ballarat, Victoria
- Original team: Ballarat
- Height: 168 cm (5 ft 6 in)
- Weight: 66 kg (146 lb)

Playing career^{1}
| Years | Club | Games (Goals) |
| 1901–1902 | Collingwood | 23 (3) |
- ^{1} Playing statistics correct to the end of 1902.

Alf Boyack (5 September 1877 – 24 October 1947) was an Australian rules footballer who played for the Collingwood Football Club in the Victorian Football League (VFL).
