= Jack Farrell (Australian footballer) =

Australian rules footballer

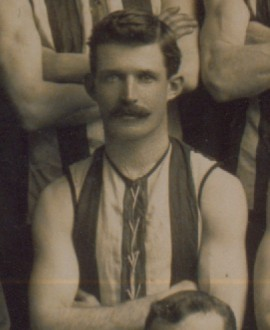
- Farrell in 1902

Personal information
- Full name: John Farrell
- Born: 3 January 1872; Maryborough, Victoria
- Died: 28 June 1953 (aged 81); West Melbourne, Victoria
- Original team: Coolgardie
- Height: 177 cm (5 ft 10 in)
- Weight: 77 kg (170 lb)

Playing career^{1}
Years	Club	Games (Goals)
1901–02	Collingwood	22 (6)
- ^{1} Playing statistics correct to the end of 1902.

Jack Farrell (3 January 1872 – 28 June 1953) was an Australian rules footballer who played with Collingwood in the Victorian Football League (VFL).
