= George Sandford (footballer) =

Australian rules footballer

Personal information
- Full name: George James Sandford
- Born: 6 July 1872; Duck Ponds, Victoria
- Died: 25 May 1940 (aged 67); Melbourne, Victoria

Playing career^{1}
Years	Club	Games (Goals)
1901–02	St Kilda	11 (0)
- ^{1} Playing statistics correct to the end of 1902.

George James Sandford (6 July 1872 – 25 May 1940) was an Australian rules footballer who played with St Kilda in the Victorian Football League (VFL).
