= Olwyn Bowey =

British artist

Olwyn Bowey RA HonRWA
- Born: 10 February 1936 (age 90); Stockton-on-Tees, England
- Education: West Hartlepool School of Art; Royal College of Art
- Known for: Painting; drawing
- Elected: ARA (1970); RA (1975); HonRBA; HonRWA

Olwyn Bowey RA HonRWA (born 10 February 1936) is a British artist.

Olwyn Bowey was born on 10 February 1936 in Stockton-on-Tees, England. She studied at the West Hartlepool School of Art and the Royal College of Art.

Bowey was elected as a Royal Academician in 1975 (ARA 1970). She is also an Honorary Member of the Royal West of England Academy and an Associate of the Royal College of Art.

Her work focuses on landscape and still-life. She is particularly interested in the concept of the artist plantsman, and often works outdoors and in her greenhouse studio in Sussex.

Her work is in the permanent collection of the Tate Gallery.
