= John Crennan =

Australian rules footballer (1880–1924)

Personal information
- Full name: John Matthew Crennan
- Born: 5 August 1880; Ballarat, Victoria
- Died: 26 April 1924 (aged 43); East Melbourne, Victoria
- Original team: Balaclava
- Position: Forward

Playing career^{1}
Years	Club	Games (Goals)
1901	St Kilda	4 (3)
- ^{1} Playing statistics correct to the end of 1901.

John Matthew Crennan (5 August 1880 – 26 April 1924) was an Australian rules footballer who played with St Kilda in the Victorian Football League (VFL).
