= Bill McCulloch =

Australian rules footballer

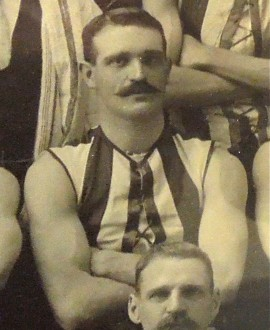
- McCulloch in 1901

Personal information
- Full name: William Joseph McCulloch
- Born: 7 November 1872; North Melbourne, Victoria
- Died: 3 September 1951 (aged 78); South Melbourne, Victoria
- Original team: Austral
- Height: 180 cm (5 ft 11 in)

Playing career^{1}
Years	Club	Games (Goals)
1897–1900	Melbourne	13 (8)
1901–1902	Collingwood	12 (5)
Total		25 (13)
- ^{1} Playing statistics correct to the end of 1902.

William Joseph McCulloch (7 November 1872 – 3 September 1951) was an Australian rules footballer who played with Melbourne and Collingwood in the Victorian Football League (VFL).
