= George Palmer (Australian footballer) =

Australian rules footballer

Personal information
- Full name: George Charles Palmer
- Born: 9 June 1879; Geelong
- Died: 30 June 1956 (aged 77); Geelong

Playing career^{1}
Years	Club	Games (Goals)
1901	Geelong	1 (0)
- ^{1} Playing statistics correct to the end of 1901.

George Palmer (9 June 1879 – 30 June 1956) was an Australian rules footballer who played with Geelong in the Victorian Football League (VFL).
