= Jimmy Larkin =

Australian rules footballer

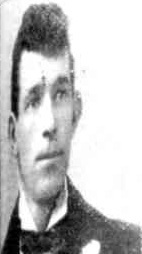
- Larkin in 1901

Personal information
- Full name: James Joseph Larkin
- Born: 27 October 1874; Maidstone, Victoria
- Died: 10 December 1930 (aged 56); North Melbourne, Victoria
- Original team: North Melbourne (VFA)
- Positions: Forward, wing

Playing career^{1}
Years	Club	Games (Goals)
1898–1903	Essendon	73 (61)
- ^{1} Playing statistics correct to the end of 1903.

Career highlights
- VFL premiership player: 1901

James Joseph Larkin (27 October 1874 – 10 December 1930) was an Australian rules footballer who played with Essendon in the Victorian Football League (VFL).

Nicknamed "Skeeter", Larkin played his football as a forward and on the wing. He came from West Melbourne originally but was recruited from North Melbourne, who competed in the Victorian Football Association.

Larkin finished the 1899 VFL season as Essendon's second leading goal-kicker, with 14 goals.

He was a half forward flanker in the 1901 Essendon premiership team and was a forward pocket in the side which lost the 1902 VFL Grand Final to Collingwood.
