= Tim McKeegan =

Australian rules footballer

Personal information
- Full name: Timothy Patrick McKeegan
- Born: 26 September 1877; Geelong, Victoria
- Died: 19 May 1939 (aged 61); Geelong, Victoria

Playing career^{1}
Years	Club	Games (Goals)
1900	South Melbourne	2 (0)
1901–02	Geelong	13 (0)
Total		15 (0)
- ^{1} Playing statistics correct to the end of 1902.

Timothy Patrick McKeegan (26 September 1877 – 19 May 1939) was an Australian rules footballer who played with South Melbourne and Geelong in the Victorian Football League (VFL).
