= Jack Baker (footballer, born 1878) =

Australian rules footballer

Personal information
- Full name: John Robert Baker
- Born: 8 May 1878; Carlton, Victoria
- Died: 28 February 1950 (aged 71); Macleod, Victoria
- Original team: Newtown
- Height: 178 cm (5 ft 10 in)
- Weight: 74 kg (163 lb)
- Position: Forward

Playing career^{1}
Years	Club	Games (Goals)
1901–02	Geelong	7 (7)
- ^{1} Playing statistics correct to the end of 1902.

John Robert Baker (8 May 1878 – 28 February 1950) was an Australian rules footballer who played with Geelong in the Victorian Football League (VFL).
