= Fred Mann (footballer) =

Australian rules footballer

Personal information
- Full name: Frederick Mann
- Born: 25 October 1878; Nottingham, England
- Died: 22 February 1970 (aged 91); Perth, Western Australia
- Original team: Leopold (MJFA)

Playing career^{1}
Years	Club	Games (Goals)
1901–03	Essendon	27 (1)
- ^{1} Playing statistics correct to the end of 1903.

Career highlights
- VFL premiership player: 1901

Fred Mann (25 October 1878 – 22 February 1970) was an Australian rules footballer who played with Essendon in the Victorian Football League (VFL).

Mann, recruited from Melbourne Junior Football Association club Leopold but born in England, made his VFL debut in 1901. In his first season, he was a member of Essendon's premiership team and played in their 1902 VFL Grand Final loss.

A defender, Mann spent the rest of the decade in the West Australian Football League, first at East Fremantle for a season in 1904 and then at South Fremantle for a longer stint which saw him play 77 games.

Ken Mann, his grandson, as well as Peter Mann, his great-grandson, played in the VFL/AFL.
