= Billy Gill =

Australian rules footballer

Personal information
- Full name: William Gill
- Born: 12 April 1876; Geelong, Victoria
- Died: 7 June 1930 (aged 54); Fitzroy, Victoria

Playing career^{1}
Years	Club	Games (Goals)
1901–02	Geelong	7 (1)
- ^{1} Playing statistics correct to the end of 1902.

William Gill (12 April 1876 – 7 June 1930) was an Australian rules footballer who played with Geelong in the Victorian Football League (VFL).
