= Bob Bryce =

Australian rules footballer

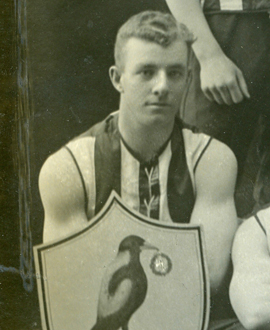
- Bryce in 1901

Personal information
- Full name: Robert Paton Bryce
- Born: 7 July 1879; Dunedin, New Zealand
- Died: 24 September 1958 (aged 79); Melbourne, Victoria
- Original team: Montague
- Height: 178 cm (5 ft 10 in)
- Weight: 78 kg (172 lb)

Playing career^{1}
Years	Club	Games (Goals)
1899–1900	South Melbourne	5 (1)
1901–02	Collingwood	13 (11)
Total		18 (12)
- ^{1} Playing statistics correct to the end of 1902.

Robert Paton Bryce (7 July 1879 – 24 September 1958) was a former Australian rules footballer who played with South Melbourne and Collingwood in the Victorian Football League (VFL).
