= Ike Woods =

Australian rules footballer

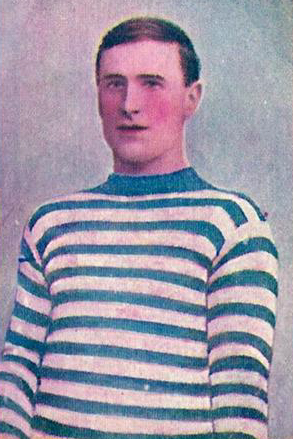
- Cigarette card of Woods in 1905

Personal information
- Full name: Isaac Henry Woods
- Born: 20 August 1879
- Died: 28 September 1962 (aged 83)
- Original team: Wellington

Playing career^{1}
Years	Club	Games (Goals)
1901–1906	Geelong	68 (108)
- ^{1} Playing statistics correct to the end of 1906.

Career highlights
- Geelong leading goalkicker: 1902, 1903, 1904, 1905

Ike Woods (20 August 1879 – 28 September 1962) was an Australian rules footballer who played with Geelong in the Victorian Football League (VFL).

== Career ==
A full-forward who was small in stature, Woods was capable from outside 50 and became known for his accurate place kicks.

Woods came to Geelong from local side Wellington and debuted late in the 1901 VFL season. By the end of the year he had made five appearances, the last of which was a semi-final loss to Collingwood. He topped Geelong's goal-kicking for the first time in 1902, with 16 goals, despite only appearing in the opening eight rounds. In 1903 he played every game and kicked a club high 34 goals, six of them in a win over Essendon at Corio Oval. That season he missed out on winning the VFL Leading Goal-kicker Award by one goal, to Collingwood's Teddy Lockwood. He was Geelong's top goal-kicker again in 1904 and 1905, with 20 goals and 19 goals respectively. His season ended after eight rounds in 1906, omitted from the team for "inattention to practice".

He left for Victorian Football Association club Prahran in 1907.
