= Frank Bowey =

Australian rules footballer

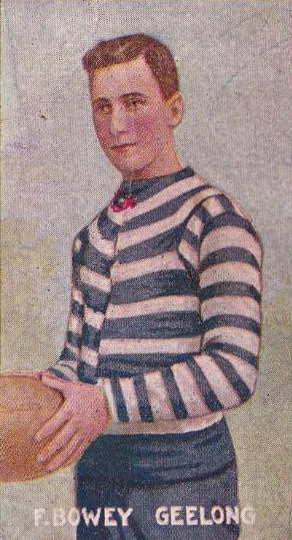
- Cigarette card of Bowey in 1906

Personal information
- Full name: Francis George Ferrier Bowey
- Born: 16 December 1881; Shepparton, Victoria
- Died: 4 July 1947 (aged 65); Taren Point, New South Wales

Playing career^{1}
Years	Club	Games (Goals)
1901–04, 1909	Geelong	44 (5)
- ^{1} Playing statistics correct to the end of 1909.

Francis George Ferrier Bowey (16 December 1881 – 4 July 1947) was an Australian rules footballer who played with Geelong in the Victorian Football League (VFL).
