= Ted Rowell (footballer) =

Australian rules footballer, born 1876

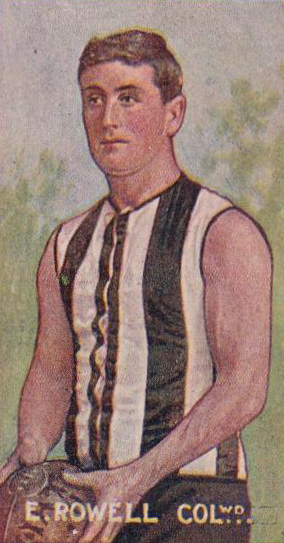

Personal information
- Full name: Edward Michael Rowell
- Born: 15 June 1876; Vaughan, Victoria
- Died: 21 July 1965 (aged 89); Kew, Victoria
- Original team: Kalgoorlie

Playing career^{1}
Years	Club	Games (Goals)
1901–1915	Collingwood	189 (175)

Coaching career
Years	Club	Games (W–L–D)
1907–1908	Collingwood	12 (6–6–0)
- ^{1} Playing statistics correct to the end of 1915.

Career highlights
- 3× VFL premiership player: 1902, 1903, 1910; 2× Collingwood leading goalkicker: 1901, 1902

Edward Michael Rowell (15 June 1876 – 21 July 1965) was a professional athlete and Australian rules footballer who played for the Collingwood Football Club in the Victorian Football League (VFL).

== Early life ==
The son of William Rowell (1836–1903) and Johanna Rowell (née Ahern, 1833–1900), Edward Michael Rowell was born in the Victorian goldfields, at Vaughan, on 15 June 1876.

As a teenager in the 1890s, Rowell was attracted to the goldfields in Western Australia and as a youngster was proficient in cricket, foot running and Australian rules football. Playing in the Kalgoorlie-based Goldfields Football League for five years, Rowell booted over 250 goals, which earned him representation in Perth in the first Australian rules goldfield representative side in 1896.

== Football career ==
Rowell made his VFL debut with the Collingwood Football Club during the 1901 season (at 24 years of age), and he played 189 games for 175 goals. He was not an overly tall player at 178 cm and weighing 80 kg, but his great advantage was his speed (which had also been useful in his career as a professional runner). Rowell scored 31 goals in the 1901 season and 33 goals in 1902, playing as a key position forward.

Rowell played in the 1903 Collingwood premiership side before moving back to Western Australia in 1904, however this was only a one-off and he attempted a return to Collingwood in 1905, but for the League not allowing a permit for him to play. He sat out the 1905 season but returned in 1906. In 1907, Rowell was switched to defence, where he became one of the first truly attacking full-backs. Prior to this, full-backs did not create run out of defence and acted more like a goalkeeper. He remained a full-back until 1914. Trademarks of his play would be to "tap the ball to himself and run along the wing", as well as his placekicking, which travelled 60 yards.

In 1907 and 1908, Rowell was the acting playing-coach of Collingwood. He added to his 1903 success as a player with another premiership in 1910. In 1914, Rowell retired, but made a surprise return in the 1915 VFL Grand Final where he was among the best players in a loss for the Magpies.

During a 1912 match for Collingwood against Essendon, Rowell was involved in an unusual incident when he got his foot stuck in a drain pipe on the ground while running for the ball against his opponent. While Rowell struggled to free himself, his opponent casually picked up the ball and easily goaled. A year earlier, in a match against Richmond, Rowell was attacked by a small dog during play.

=== Representative ===
Rowell played 7 games for Victoria for 7 goals.

== Athletic career ==
Rowell was also a noted athlete who once raced world record holder Jack Donaldson over 100 yards at half-time of a Collingwood match Rowell played in. Rowell narrowly lost, having just played 50 minutes of football.

== After football ==
Rowell later wrote a series of sporting articles.

== Personal life ==
Rowell married Rachel Johnston (1891–1970) at Footscray, Victoria on 4 March 1908.

== Death ==
Rowell died at 89 years of age at the Studley Park private hospital in Kew, Victoria on 21 July 1965.

== See also ==
- 1911 Adelaide Carnival
