= Bill Bennion =

Australian rules footballer

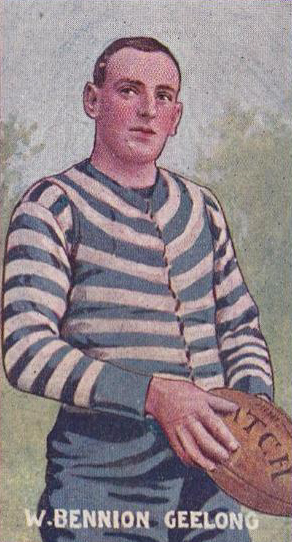
- Cigarette card of Bennion in 1906

Personal information
- Full name: William Edwin Bennion
- Born: 6 September 1881; Geelong, Victoria
- Died: 18 December 1940 (aged 59); West Melbourne, Victoria
- Original team: Geelong West (GDFA)

Playing career^{1}
Years	Club	Games (Goals)
1901–04	Geelong	46 (6)
- ^{1} Playing statistics correct to the end of 1904.

William Edwin Bennion (6 September 1881 – 18 December 1940) was an Australian rules footballer who played with Geelong in the Victorian Football League (VFL).
