= Leo S. Morgan =

Australian rules footballer (1879–1947)

Leo Morgan
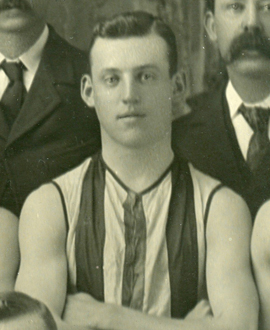
- Morgan in 1901

Personal information
- Full name: Leonard St Clair Morgan
- Born: 19 September 1879; Hamilton, Victoria
- Died: 5 July 1947 (aged 67); Oakleigh, Victoria
- Original team: Ballarat Imperials
- Position: Back pocket

Playing career^{1}
Years	Club	Games (Goals)
1901–1902	Collingwood	19 (6)
- ^{1} Playing statistics correct to the end of 1902.

Leonard St Clair Morgan (19 September 1879 – 5 July 1947) was an Australian rules footballer who played for Collingwood in the Victorian Football League (VFL) at the turn of the 20th century.
