= List of VFL debuts in 1904 =

The 1904 VFL season was the eighth season of the Victorian Football League (VFL). Ninety eight players made their senior debut in the 1904 season, while another 18 players debuted for a new club having previously played in the VFL.

== Summary ==
Summary of debuts in 1904
Club	VFL debuts	Change of club
Carlton	11	4
Collingwood	12	–
Essendon	7	2
Fitzroy	9	1
Geelong	14	1
Melbourne	9	4
South Melbourne	18	3
St Kilda	18	3
Total	98	18

== Debuts ==
Name	Club	Age at debut	Round debuted	Games	Goals	Notes
Billy Payne	Carlton	22 years, 253 days	1	127	0	
Ted Kennedy	Carlton	26 years, 243 days	1	106	13	Brother of James Kennedy. Previously played for Essendon.
Bob Boyle	Carlton	27 years, 173 days	4	36	4	
Harry Newbound	Carlton	22 years, 232 days	2	18	2	Previously played for Collingwood.
Eddie Prescott	Carlton	23 years, 199 days	8	11	9	
Percy Pitt	Carlton	20 years, 249 days	2	8	11	
Pat Pelly	Carlton	26 years, 198 days	4	8	0	
Henry Whight	Carlton	22 years, 64 days	2	7	0	
Arthur Ryan	Carlton	23 years, 219 days	1	4	0	
Rupe Bradley	Carlton	22 years, 233 days	3	4	4	
Albert Gourlay	Carlton	22 years, 330 days	3	3	0	Previously played for Melbourne.
Jim Cullen	Carlton	25 years, 333 days	1	1	0	Previously played for South Melbourne and Essendon.
Jimmy Gaynor	Carlton	27 years, 11 days	4	1	0	
Sam Marron	Carlton	20 years, 118 days	5	1	0	
Ernie Ashton	Carlton	21 years, 44 days	15	1	0	
Robert Nash	Collingwood	20 years, 85 days	11	88	14	Father of Laurie Nash.
Bob Strachan	Collingwood	17 years, 352 days	1	52	27	
Don Fraser	Collingwood	21 years, 269 days	5	31	0	
Bill Homan	Collingwood	23 years, 134 days	1	12	8	
Grahame McConechy	Collingwood	23 years, 336 days	1	7	6	
Ivor Lawson	Collingwood	21 years, 19 days	1	7	2	
Harry Neil	Collingwood	21 years, 286 days	8	4	0	
Allan Belcher	Collingwood	19 years, 227 days	11	4	1	Brother of Vic Belcher.
Bob Burns	Collingwood	19 years, 339 days	1	2	0	
Wally Sykes	Collingwood	23 years, 5 days	1	2	0	
Darcy McDougall	Collingwood	18 years, 35 days	3	1	0	
Les Abbott	Collingwood	19 years, 16 days	8	1	0	
Bill Busbridge	Essendon	19 years, 98 days	1	103	32	
Arthur Legge	Essendon	22 years, 229 days	3	69	30	
Bert Laxton	Essendon	24 years, 266 days	2	44	3	
Fred Robinson	Essendon	19 years, 365 days	2	35	0	Brother of Alex, Bill and Gordon Robinson.
Jim Phipps	Essendon	20 years, 73 days	9	22	0	
Alex Robinson	Essendon	17 years, 262 days	1	9	5	Brother of Bill, Fred and Gordon Robinson and father of Alexander and George Robinson. Played first-class cricket for Western Australia.
Alf Swift	Essendon	32 years, 290 days	3	7	2	
Mick Pleass	Essendon	29 years, 205 days	5	4	0	Previously played for South Melbourne.
Norman Belcher	Essendon	24 years, 302 days	1	2	0	Previously played for Geelong.
Percy Sheehan	Fitzroy	20 years, 307 days	1	58	11	
Joe Johnson	Fitzroy	21 years, 109 days	1	55	15	First known Indigenous Australian to play in the Victorian Football League.
Edgar Kneen	Fitzroy	21 years, 241 days	1	48	33	
Gilbert Barker	Fitzroy	21 years, 310 days	5	42	4	
Jack McDonough	Fitzroy	24 years, 314 days	5	29	6	Previously played for South Melbourne.
Les Sharp	Fitzroy	18 years, 248 days	5	23	12	
Paddy Shea	Fitzroy	18 years, 58 days	2	13	8	Also played first-class cricket for Victoria.
Bill Kelly	Fitzroy	21 years, 173 days	2	7	0	
Hedley Tomkins	Fitzroy	18 years, 338 days	2	4	0	
Fred Lethbridge	Fitzroy	20 years, 111 days	3	3	1	
Dick Grigg	Geelong	18 years, 334 days	1	194	64	
George Doull	Geelong	24 years, 190 days	1	96	16	
Tom Rankin	Geelong	23 years, 4 days	1	47	12	
Jim Munday	Geelong	16 years, 340 days	7	33	1	
Jack Knell	Geelong	25 years, 358 days	9	32	12	
Mick Holligan	Geelong	22 years, 339 days	15	6	3	
Henry Molan	Geelong	25 years, 34 days	2	5	0	
Bert Clarke	Geelong	20 years, 69 days	6	4	3	
Bill Burns	Geelong	20 years, 1 days	15	2	0	
Reg Digby	Geelong	25 years, 212 days	15	2	1	
Joe Fox	Geelong	26 years, 347 days	15	2	0	Previously played for South Melbourne.
Jimmy Roberts	Geelong	21 years, 21 days	1	1	0	
George Horman	Geelong	20 years, 254 days	7	1	0	
Peter McMurrich	Geelong	18 years, 72 days	12	1	0	
Henry Cheeseman	Geelong	28 years, 258 days	17	1	1	
Joe Pearce	Melbourne	19 years, 107 days	2	152	5	One of the first VFL footballers killed in the First World War.
Bernie Nolan	Melbourne	20 years, 197 days	1	84	10	
Hugh Purse	Melbourne	22 years, 218 days	1	84	26	
Jim Conquest	Melbourne	23 years, 343 days	1	54	22	
Ted Leach	Melbourne	21 years, 13 days	1	23	9	Previously played for Collingwood.
Mark Gardner	Melbourne	19 years, 288 days	8	14	1	
Roy Adam	Melbourne	21 years, 87 days	6	12	3	Previously played for St Kilda.
Ernie Vollugi	Melbourne	25 years, 122 days	1	4	0	
Henri Jeanneret	Melbourne	26 years, 134 days	2	4	0	Previously played for South Melbourne.
Lionel Smale	Melbourne	25 years, 164 days	1	2	0	
Tom Watson	Melbourne	30 years, 127 days	1	1	0	Previously played for Carlton.
Alec Woods	Melbourne	22 years, 243 days	2	1	0	
Ted Wade	Melbourne	19 years, 151 days	3	1	0	
Bill Strang	South Melbourne	20 years, 276 days	10	69	80	Father of Allan, Colin, Doug and Gordon Strang, and grandfather of Geoff Strang.
Dick McCabe	South Melbourne	26 years, 327 days	1	51	0	Previously played for Fitzroy and St Kilda.
Harry Gibson	South Melbourne	25 years, 132 days	1	41	11	
Charles Clements	South Melbourne	22 years, 54 days	2	32	68	
Bert Sharpe	South Melbourne	26 years, 15 days	3	17	17	Previously played for Fitzroy.
Bill Griffiths	South Melbourne	25 years, 60 days	5	9	0	
Jim Schellnack	South Melbourne		5	7	6	
John Catarinich	South Melbourne	21 years, 274 days	14	7	0	
Dave McColl	South Melbourne	28 years, 99 days	1	5	0	
Henry Morley Kidgell	South Melbourne	23 years, 113 days	11	5	0	
Les Weate	South Melbourne	19 years, 106 days	9	4	1	
Syd Wright	South Melbourne	21 years, 340 days	15	3	0	
Herb Bruton	South Melbourne	25 years, 333 days	1	2	0	
Artie Percy	South Melbourne	24 years, 137 days	15	2	0	
Leslie Hope	South Melbourne	19 years, 195 days	1	1	0	
Edmund Johnson	South Melbourne	21 years, 59 days	1	1	0	
Robert Daykin	South Melbourne	23 years, 183 days	9	1	0	
Tom Hawking	South Melbourne	22 years, 162 days	13	1	0	Uncle of George Hawking.
Peter McCann	South Melbourne	22 years, 56 days	15	1	0	
Jim Darcy	South Melbourne	23 years, 194 days	17	1	0	Previously played for Essendon.
Con Hogan	South Melbourne	23 years, 16 days	17	1	0	
Wally Scott	St Kilda	19 years, 363 days	8	108	4	
Dan Feehan	St Kilda	24 years, 90 days	1	85	9	
Jack Julian	St Kilda	19 years, 202 days	17	67	0	
Bill Mahoney	St Kilda	19 years, 141 days	03	17	9	Previously played for Geelong.
Jim King	St Kilda	30 years, 194 days	5	13	2	Previously played for South Melbourne.
Tommy Ryan	St Kilda	32 years, 211 days	1	11	8	Previously played for Melbourne.
Jack King	St Kilda	25 years, 162 days	8	8	0	
John Moloney	St Kilda	22 years, 195 days	4	3	0	
Alec Moffatt	St Kilda	25 years, 213 days	15	3	0	
Fred Whelpton	St Kilda	19 years, 071 days	3	2	0	
Jim Hallahan, Sr.	St Kilda	26 years, 035 days	10	2	0	Father of Jim Hallahan, Jr. and Tom Hallahan.
Frank Kenny	St Kilda	26 years, 011 days	15	2	0	
Jim Marshall	St Kilda	22 years, 112 days	1	1	0	
David Starke	St Kilda	24 years, 242 days	2	1	0	
Des Griffin	St Kilda	22 years, 252 days	12	1	0	
Dan Scullion	St Kilda	18 years, 71 days	14	1	0	
Ivor Evans	St Kilda	17 years, 34 days	16	1	0	
Gordon Downes	St Kilda	26 years, 72 days	17	1	0	
Lewis Jones	St Kilda	17 years, 311 days	17	1	0	
Joe Marchant	St Kilda	19 years, 358 days	17	1	0	
Jimmy Sheehan	St Kilda	20 years, 153 days	17	1	2	
