= List of VFL/AFL players born outside Australia =

This is a list of players who have played at least one senior game in the Australian Football League (AFL), previously known as the Victorian Football League (VFL), who were born outside Australia.

== Players born outside Australia ==
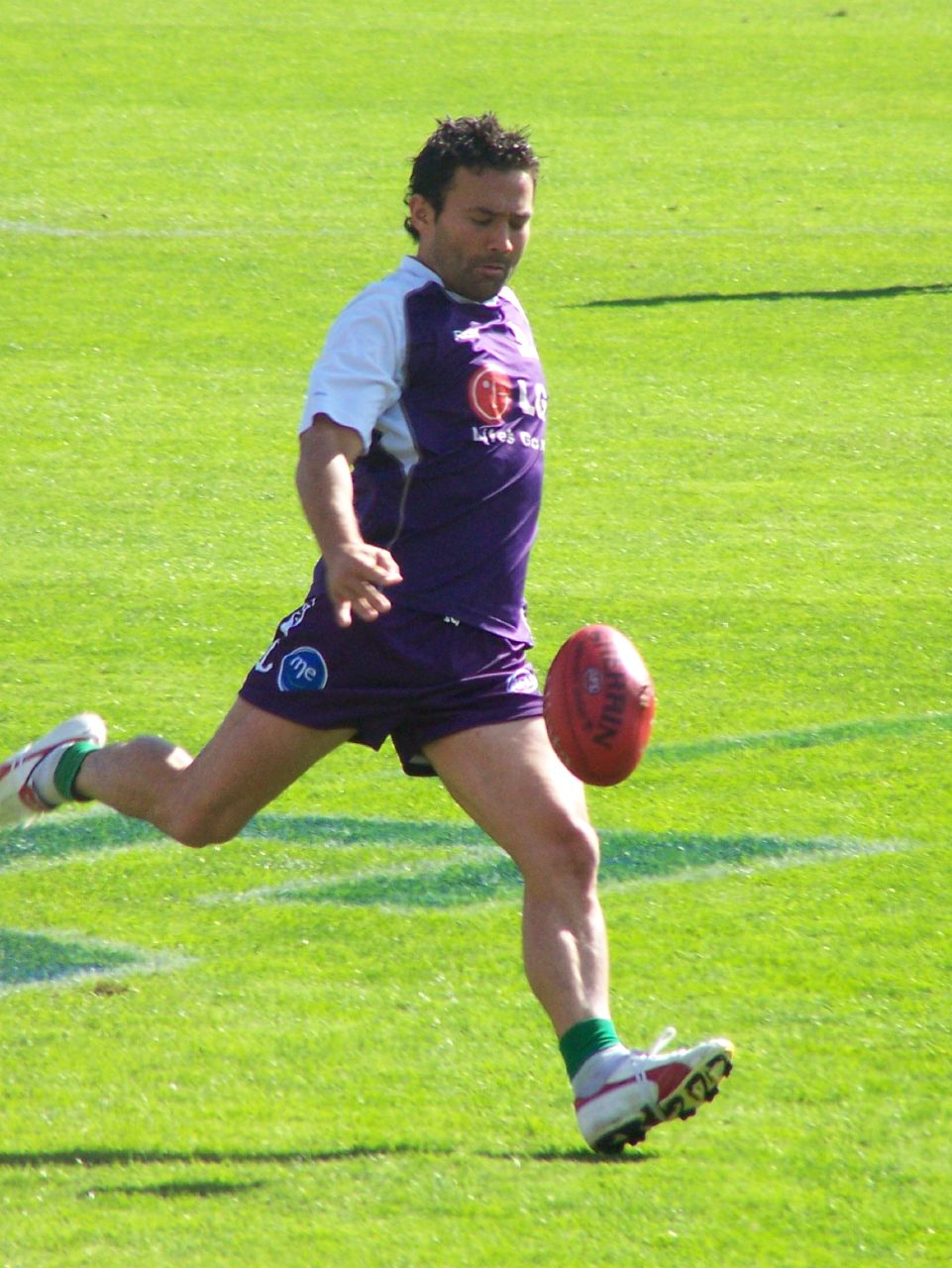
Peter Bell (South Korea) played 286 AFL games.

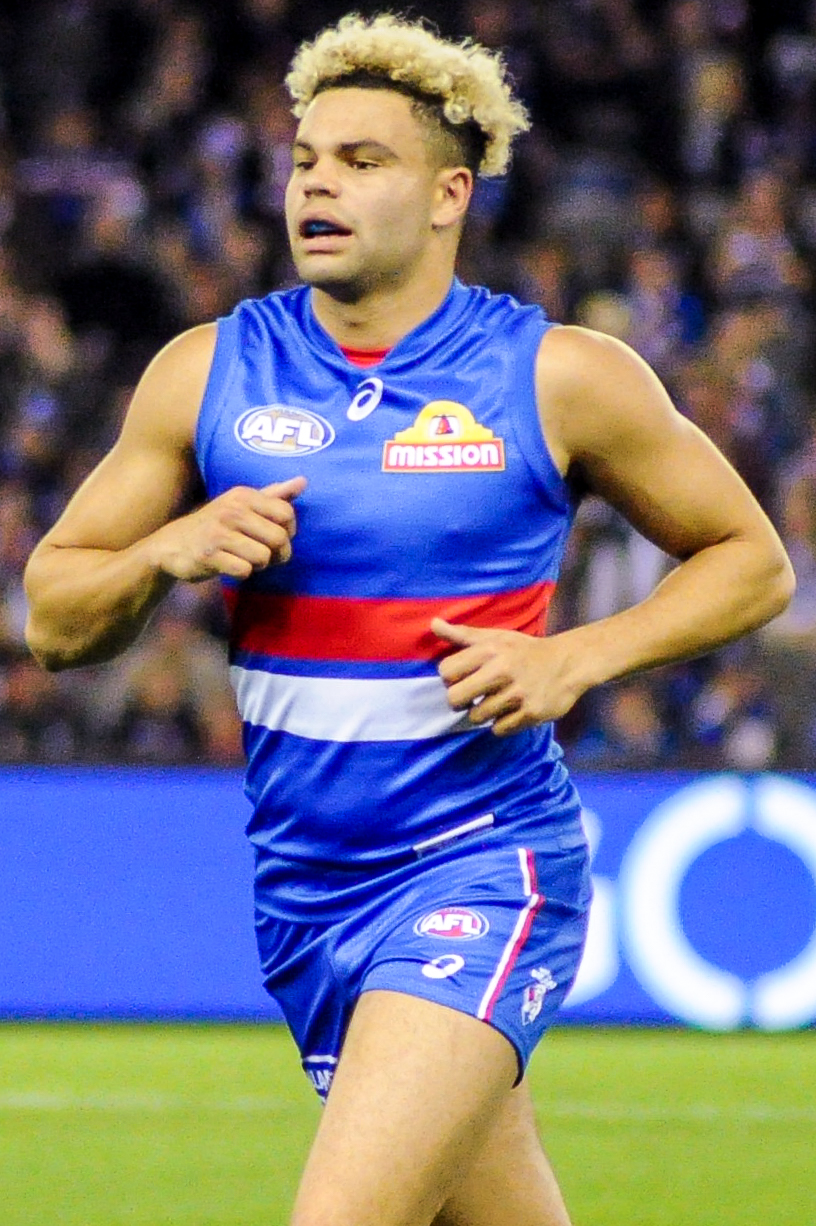
Jason Johannisen (South Africa) is a Norm Smith Medallist.

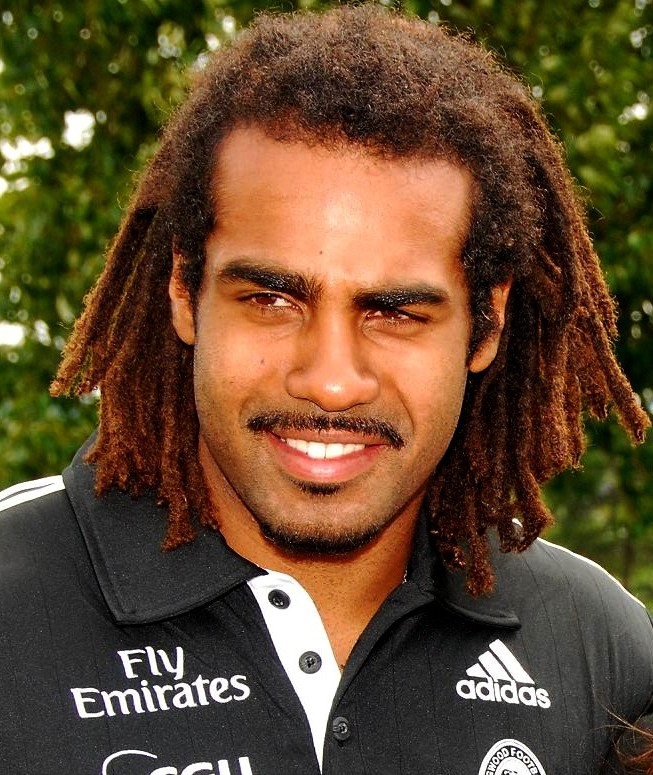
Héritier Lumumba (Brazil) is a premiership player.

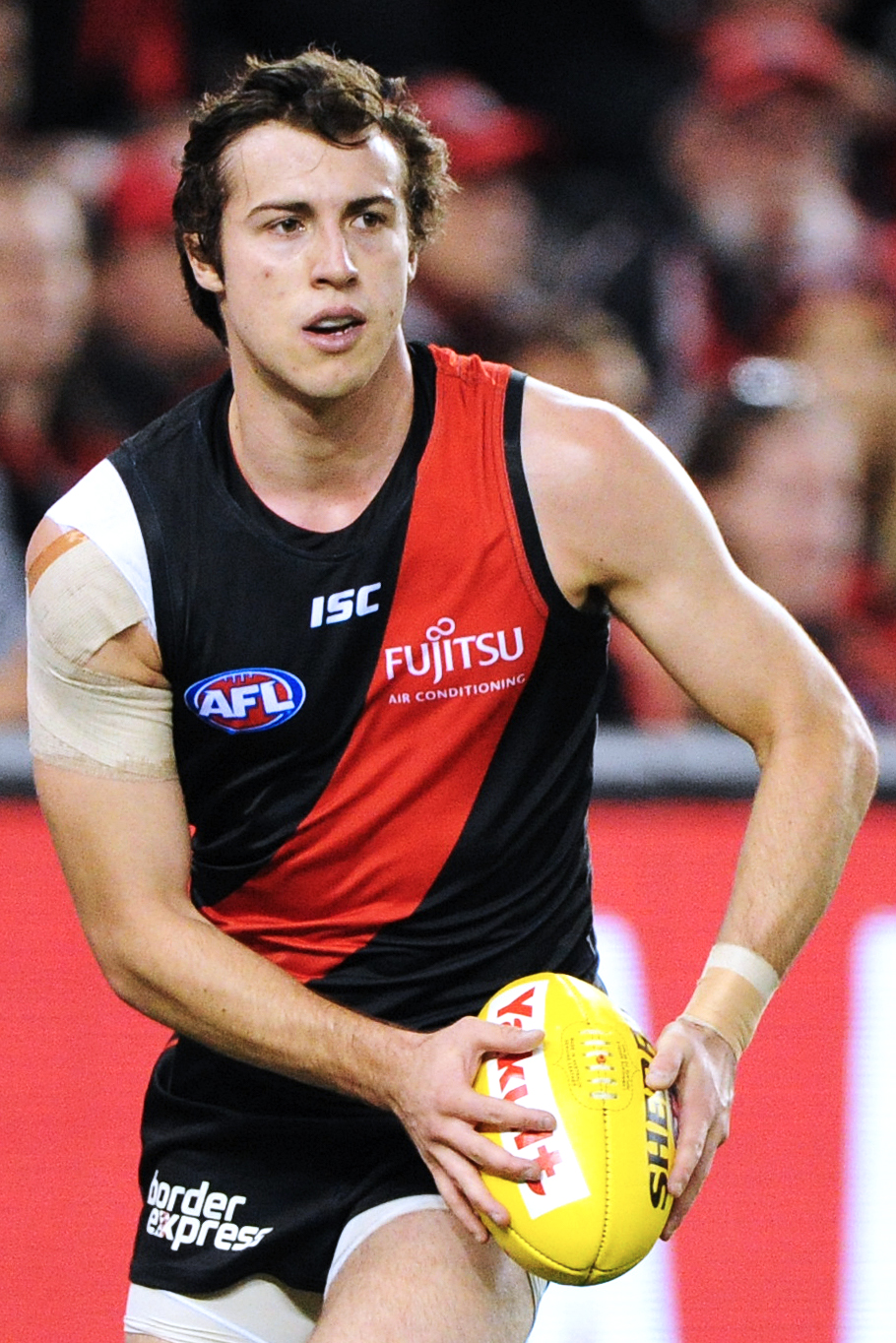
Andrew McGrath (Canada) won the 2017 AFL Rising Star.

^	Denotes current player

Name	Country of birth	Club(s)	Career span	Games	Goals
Peter Agrums	Latvia	North Melbourne	1963–1964	11	4
Leek Aleer^	Kenya	Greater Western Sydney	2022–	25	0
Aliir Aliir^	Kenya	Sydney, Port Adelaide	2016–	178	6
Mac Andrew^	Egypt	Gold Coast	2022–	65	12
Ivan Astruc	Mauritius	Fitzroy	1897	6	1
Jack Baggott	South Africa	Essendon, Richmond	1927–1937	138	140
Connor Ballenden	New Zealand	Brisbane Lions	2018–2021	3	1
Jack Barnett	New Zealand	Richmond	1924–1926	13	11
Niels Becker	West Germany (now Germany)	Footscray	1962–1963	10	3
Peter Bell	South Korea	Fremantle, North Melbourne	1995–2008	286	250
Peter Bennett	New Zealand	Essendon, Hawthorn	1976–1981	80	27
Peter Bevilacqua	Italy	Carlton	1953	1	0
Fred Birnstihl	German Empire (now Germany)	Footscray	1927	2	0
James Borlase^	Egypt	Adelaide	2023–	16	1
Atu Bosenavulagi	Fiji	Collingwood, North Melbourne	2019–2022	20	1
Mordecai Bromberg	Israel	St Kilda	1978–1981	34	11
Bob Bryce	New Zealand	South Melbourne, Collingwood	1899–1902	18	12
Adam Campbell	New Zealand	Fremantle	2006–2009	13	13
Alipate Carlile	Fiji	Port Adelaide	2006–2016	167	5
Peter Castrikum	Dutch East Indies (now Indonesia)	Footscray	1965	6	0
Mabior Chol^	Sudan (now South Sudan)	Richmond, Gold Coast, Hawthorn	2016–	107	156
Alf Clay	South Africa	Hawthorn, Footscray, Fitzroy, North Melbourne	1937–1946	83	39
Brant Colledge	France	West Coast	2014–2015	3	0
Harold Collocott	Fiji	Geelong	1900	1	0
Sudjai Cook	Thailand	Adelaide	1998	7	2
Mason Cox^	United States	Collingwood, Fremantle	2016–	139	127
Jim Cowcher	New Zealand	Carlton	1898	5	0
Trent Croad	New Zealand	Fremantle, Hawthorn	1998–2008	222	189
Damian Cupido	South Africa	Brisbane Lions, Essendon	2000–2005	53	66
Ben Cunningham	New Zealand	Fremantle	2000–2005	33	22
Majak Daw	Sudan	North Melbourne, Melbourne	2013–2020	54	43
Donald Dickie	New Zealand	Port Adelaide	1997–2000	55	19
Colin Dufty	Fiji	Collingwood	1914	1	1
Aaron Edwards	Samoa	North Melbourne, West Coast	2005–2011	73	107
Neil Erasmus^	South Africa	Fremantle	2022–	39	4
Harry Frei	West Germany (now Germany)	Footscray	1973	6	0
Ted Garside	South Africa	Hawthorn	1931	6	0
Arthur Gilligan	New Zealand	Essendon, Fitzroy	1902–1905	32	15
Mil Hanna	Lebanon	Carlton	1986–1997	190	83
Harry Haughton	New Zealand	Carlton	1912–1919	113	49
Jason Holmes	United States	St Kilda	2015–2017	5	0
Karmichael Hunt	New Zealand	Gold Coast	2011–2014	44	6
Alex Ishchenko	Ukraine	Brisbane Bears, North Melbourne, West Coast	1987–1995	142	37
Bohdan Jaworskyj	East Germany (now Germany)	Hawthorn	1973–1975	67	3
Henri Jeanneret	Switzerland	Melbourne, South Melbourne	1898–1904	113	49
Alex Jesaulenko	Austria	Carlton, St Kilda	1967–1981	279	444
Changkuoth Jiath^	Ethiopia	Hawthorn, Melbourne	2019–	75	5
Tew Jiath^	Ethiopia	Collingwood	2024–	1	0
Jason Johannisen	South Africa	Western Bulldogs	2012–2025	212	77
Tom Jok	Sudan (now South Sudan)	Essendon	2019	1	0
Warren Jones	New Zealand	Carlton, St Kilda	1978–1988	123	36
Buku Khamis^	Sudan (now South Sudan)	Western Bulldogs	2019–	41	20
Robbert Klomp	Netherlands	Carlton, Footscray	1979–1984	93	20
Peter Ladhams^	Papua New Guinea	Port Adelaide, Sydney	2017–	65	35
Josh Lai^	Singapore	Port Adelaide	2026–	1	0
Stephen Lawrence	South Africa	Hawthorn	1988–1998	146	30
Mykelti Lefau^	New Zealand	Richmond	2024–	11	14
Heritier Lumumba	Brazil	Collingwood, Melbourne	2005–2016	178	25
Artie Machin	New Zealand	South Melbourne	1898	3	0
Aubrey MacKenzie	South Africa	Melbourne, St Kilda	1914–1924	12	17
Frank Macky	New Zealand	University	1911	7	2
Oleg Markov	Belarus	Richmond, Gold Coast, Collingwood	2016–2025	94	8
Rowan Marshall^	New Zealand	St Kilda	2017–	156	78
Kris Massie	Sweden	Carlton, Adelaide	1998–2008	131	23
Daniel McAlister	New Zealand	Essendon	1997–2002	6	0
Dave McColl	New Zealand	South Melbourne	1904	5	0
Marty McDonnell	New Zealand	Footscray	1939–1950	92	2
Abe McDougall	New Zealand	Fitzroy	1898–1902	59	28
Andrew McGrath^	Canada	Essendon	2017–	180	21
Charlie Meadway	New Zealand	Carlton, Collingwood	1906–1907	4	0
Bill Mearns	New Zealand	St Kilda	1910	3	1
Eddie Melai	Netherlands	South Melbourne	1964	7	2
Mal Michael	Papua New Guinea	Brisbane Lions, Collingwood, Essendon	1997–2008	238	33
Charlie Moore	Fiji	Essendon	1897–1899	30	34
Ian Muller	South Africa	Carlton, St Kilda	1984–1991	27	2
Conor Nash^	United States	Hawthorn	2018–	119	21
Bigoa Nyuon	Kenya	Richmond, North Melbourne	2020–2024	4	0
Hewago Oea	Papua New Guinea	Gold Coast	2022–2024	13	5
Thomas O'Halloran	New Zealand	Richmond	1925–1934	142	120
Daniel Pearce	New Zealand	Western Bulldogs	2012–2015	5	0
Val Perovic	Croatia	Carlton, St Kilda	1973–1985	174	13
Ian Perrie	Zimbabwe	Adelaide	1998–2007	115	133
Cameron Polson	Hong Kong	Carlton	2017–2020	19	4
Fred Pringle	India	Carlton	1923–1924	22	7
Don Pyke	United States	West Coast	1989–1996	132	97
Mike Pyke	Canada	Sydney	2009–2015	110	48
Willis Reeve	Myanmar	Fitzroy	1927–1932	86	0
Brent Renouf	New Zealand	Hawthorn, Port Adelaide	2008–2011	52	9
Bruce Reville^	Papua New Guinea	Brisbane Lions	2024–	23	7
David Rodan	Fiji	Port Adelaide, Richmond, Melbourne	2002–2013	166	127
Brian Roet	Cuba	Melbourne	1961–1968	88	1
Jose Romero	Chile	Footscray/Western Bulldogs, North Melbourne	1988–2001	211	169
Alex Ruscuklic	East Germany (now Germany)	Carlton, Fitzroy	1966–1974	117	209
Shane Savage	New Zealand	Hawthorn, St Kilda	2009–2020	165	63
Wayne Schwass	New Zealand	North Melbourne, Sydney	1988–2002	282	154
Joe Sellwood	New Zealand	Geelong	1930–1945	180	97
Dannie Seow	Singapore	Collingwood, Melbourne	1986–1990	25	10
Ben Sexton	Papua New Guinea	Carlton, Footscray	1991–1996	43	33
Michael Sexton	Papua New Guinea	Carlton	1990–2000	200	23
Jack Southern	New Zealand	South Melbourne	1897–1899	31	3
Bob Svorinich	Italy	South Melbourne	1969–1971	8	7
Ron Tenabel	Netherlands	South Melbourne	1965–1967	17	0
Heinz Tonn	Weimar Republic (now Germany)	Fitzroy	1947	6	2
Wennie Van Lint	Netherlands	South Melbourne	1967	2	0
Ron Van T'Hag	Netherlands	Geelong	1959	2	0
Eric Vinar	Czech Republic	Fitzroy	1964	8	3
Paul Vinar	Czech Republic	Geelong	1959–1966	132	45
Brandon Walker^	Ghana	Fremantle	2021–	66	2
Fred Warry	Seychelles	St Kilda	1900	2	0
Arthur Watson	New Zealand	Hawthorn	1929	2	0
Tom Watson	New Zealand	Carlton, Melbourne	1902–1904	15	0
Sanford Wheeler	United States	Sydney	1989–1994	43	7
Reuben William	Sudan (now South Sudan)	Brisbane Lions	2016–2017	3	0
Rupert Wills	New Zealand	Collingwood	2016–2020	23	1
Barney Wood	New Zealand	Melbourne	1928	5	0

== Players born in the British and Irish Isles ==
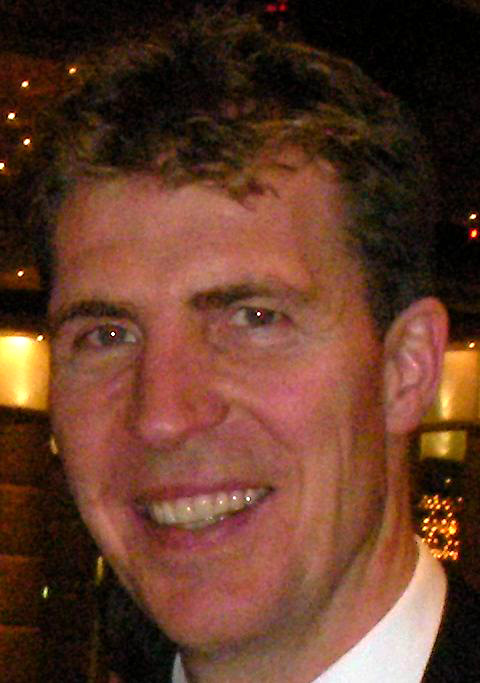
Jim Stynes (Ireland) won the Brownlow Medal in 1991.

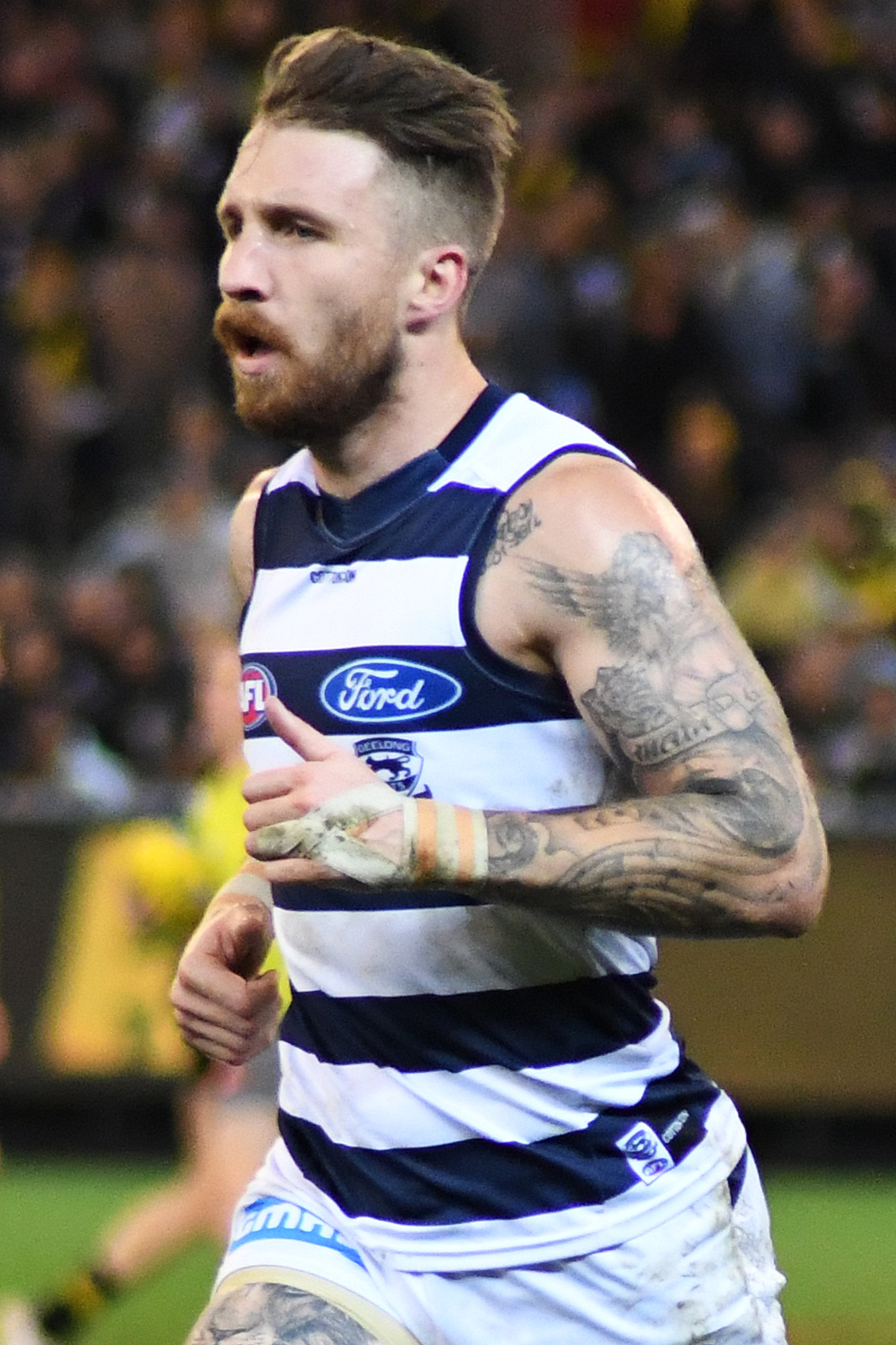
Zach Tuohy (Ireland) played a record 288 AFL games.

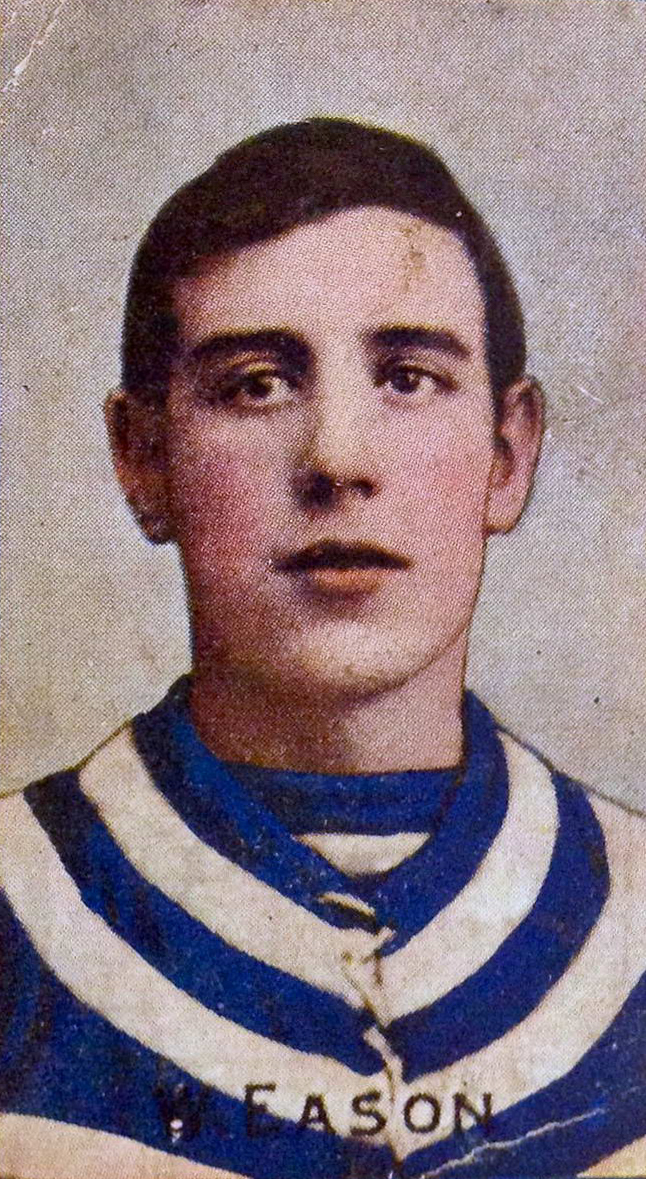
Bill Eason (England) was Geelong's first player to reach 200 appearances.

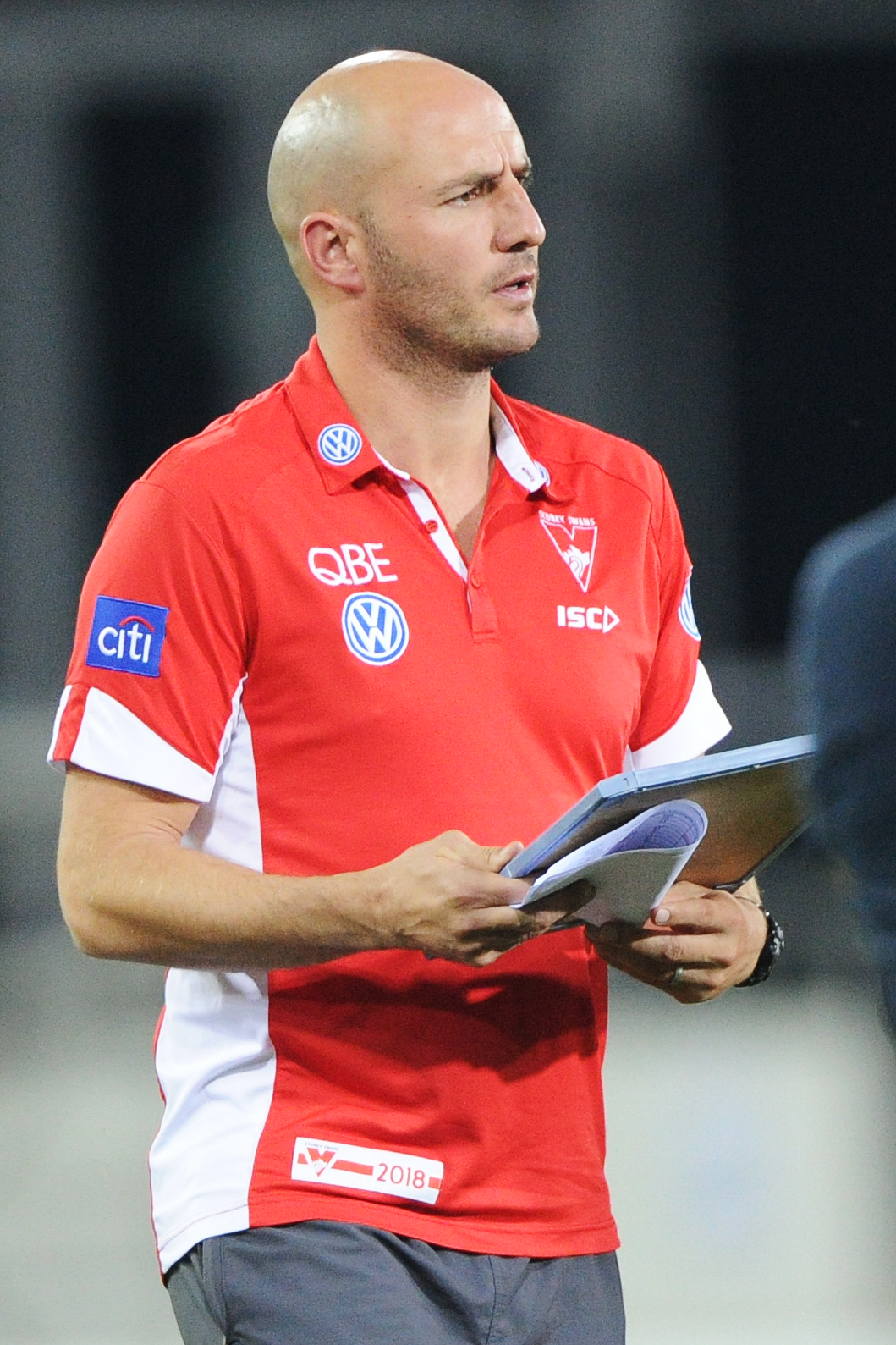
Tadhg Kennelly (Ireland) is a premiership player.

^	Denotes current player

Name	Country of birth	Club(s)	Career span	Games	Goals
Bill Ahern	Ireland	Carlton	1897	1	0
Ramsay Anderson	Scotland	Essendon, University	1910–1912	31	0
Bert Ashby	England	Hawthorn	1928–1935	25	6
Harry Aylwin	England	St Kilda	1897–1899	29	0
Alf Bartlett	England	Fitzroy	1901–1907	80	5
Keith Baskin	England	South Melbourne	1964–1973	75	78
Mark Bayliss	England	Collingwood	1989	4	6
Colm Begley	Ireland	Brisbane Lions, St Kilda	2006–2009	30	7
Ted Besford	England	Fitzroy	1939–1941	2	0
Bernie Bignell	England	Carlton	1940–1945	6	0
Lawrence Bingham	England	Hawthorn, St Kilda	1989–1993	25	0
Wayne Blackwell	England	Carlton	1984–990	110	80
Bill Bourke	Ireland	Richmond	1908–1909	32	45
Percy Bowyer	England	Collingwood	1928–1938	154	33
Ted Brewis	England	Carlton	1925–1928	60	12
Alan Broadley	England	South Melbourne	1941	3	1
Callum Brown^	England	Greater Western Sydney	2021–	64	67
Chris Burton	England	Footscray, Richmond	1980–1988	117	35
Ciarán Byrne	Ireland	Carlton	2014–2018	22	0
Dick Campbell	Ireland (now Northern Ireland)	St Kilda	1909	1	0
Martin Clarke	Ireland	Collingwood	2007–2013	72	19
Ted Cordner	England	Melbourne	1941–1946	52	0
Aidan Corr^	Northern Ireland	Greater Western Sydney, North Melbourne	2013–	172	3
Ian Dargie	England	St Kilda, West Coast	1989–1991	11	1
Harry Davie	England	Carlton, Melbourne	1924–1928	58	186
Jim Davies	Wales	Carlton	1949–1950	16	1
Reg Davies	Wales	Hawthorn	1930–1931	3	0
Bart Dinsmore	Scotland	St Kilda	1903	2	3
Paul Earley	England	Melbourne	1984	1	1
Bill Eason	England	Geelong	1902–1915	220	187
Jack Edgeley	England	Fitzroy	1907–1908	8	1
Bob Edmond	Scotland	Carlton	1967–1968	10	0
Jim Edmond	Scotland	Footscray, Sydney, Brisbane Bears	1977–1988	188	287
Dinny Fagan	England	South Melbourne	1929–1931	19	0
Fred Fairweather	England	North Melbourne	1944–1946	54	14
Dick Fowler	England	Melbourne	1908	1	0
Jack Frost	England	Carlton	1897	4	0
Conor Glass	Ireland	Hawthorn	2017–2020	21	2
Fred Godfrey	England	Footscray	1938	6	5
Andy Goodwin	England	Melbourne, Richmond	1987–1993	73	9
John Gray	Scotland	University	1908–1913	85	3
Dick Hall	Wales	Collingwood	1897	1	0
Pearce Hanley	England	Brisbane Lions, Gold Coast	2008–2020	169	60
Paul Harding	England	Hawthorn, St Kilda, West Coast	1987–1994	116	14
Bob Hay	Scotland	Fitzroy	1899–1901	9	1
Oliver Hayes-Brown	England	Richmond	2026	7	1
Connor Idun^	England	Greater Western Sydney	2019–	117	0
Brandon Jack	England	Sydney	2013–2017	28	16
Bill Johnstone	Scotland	Collingwood	1941	2	0
Darragh Joyce^	Ireland	St Kilda, Brisbane Lions, North Melbourne	2018–	24	0
Mark Keane^	Ireland	Collingwood, Adelaide	2019–2021, 2023–	56	0
Frank Kelly	England	Footscray	1941–1944	8	0
Tadhg Kennelly	Ireland	Sydney	2001–2011	197	30
Bob Kenny	Ireland	St Kilda	1899	2	0
Denis Lanigan	Ireland	Collingwood, Melbourne, Carlton	1897–1899	41	6
Barney Lazarus	Ireland	Carlton	1902	7	0
Thomas Leather	Scotland	North Melbourne	1932–1933	16	11
Harry Lees	England	Collingwood	1908	1	0
Johnny Leonard	England	South Melbourne	1932	12	17
Cameron Mackenzie^	England	Hawthorn	2023–	46	12
James Madden	Ireland	Brisbane Lions	2021–2024	11	1
Stuart Magee	Northern Ireland	Footscray, South Melbourne	1962–1975	216	149
Fred Mann	England	Essendon	1901–1903	27	1
Frank Maple	England	Hawthorn	1926	2	1
Nick Marshall	Scotland	Geelong	1907–1908	4	0
William Marshall	England	Melbourne, University	1905–1908	12	0
Bryan Martin	England	Melbourne	1942–1943	5	0
John McCarthy	Wales	Fitzroy, North Melbourne	1986–1996	163	178
Alan McCrory	Ireland	Richmond, South Melbourne	1938–1941	9	4
Bob McIlveen	Scotland	Richmond	1943	6	0
Niall McKeever	Northern Ireland	Brisbane Lions	2011–2012	17	1
Conor McKenna^	Northern Ireland	Essendon, Brisbane Lions	2015–2020, 2023–	128	29
Hugh McLaughlin Sr.	Scotland	South Melbourne, Footscray	1929–1937	129	0
Tom McNeil	Scotland	St Kilda	1951–1952	8	0
Dermot McNicholl	Ireland	St Kilda	1990	3	0
Henry McPetrie	Scotland	Carlton	1897	5	2
Donald Mills	Jersey	Hawthorn	1929–1931	15	0
Jim Money	Scotland	Geelong	1928	2	1
Caolan Mooney	Ireland	Collingwood	2012–2014	6	2
Brad Moran	England	Adelaide, North Melbourne	2006–2011	21	8
Doug Morgan	Wales	Geelong	1909–1911	18	3
Oisín Mullin^	Ireland	Geelong	2023–	41	1
Brian Mulvihill	England	North Melbourne	1971–1972	24	25
Brian Mynott	England	St Kilda	1964–1975	210	75
Eric Needham	England	St Kilda	1933	1	0
Ingy Norman	Wales	Fitzroy	1938	1	0
Jack Norman	Wales	Fitzroy	1938	1	0
Liam O'Connell^	Ireland	St Kilda	2025–	7	0
Mark O'Connor^	Ireland	Geelong	2017–	145	10
Laurie Ogilvie	Scotland	Melbourne	1901	4	3
Joe O'Grady	Ireland	St Kilda	1897	9	0
Setanta Ó hAilpín	Ireland	Carlton, Greater Western Sydney	2005–2013	88	82
Bill Perkins	England	Richmond	1940–1949	148	0
Jamie O'Reilly	Northern Ireland	Richmond	2010–2011	4	0
Colin O'Riordan	Ireland	Sydney	2015–2022	34	1
Michael Quinn	Ireland	Essendon	2009–2011	8	2
Jim Redstone	England	South Melbourne	1938	4	5
George Renwick	England	Carlton	1909	4	0
Ralph Robertson	England	St Kilda	1898–1900	14	1
Eddie Rosenbrock	England	South Melbourne	1929–1930	4	0
Bobby Royle	England	Melbourne	1898	3	0
John Scarlett	England	Geelong, South Melbourne	1967-1978	212	44
Fred Scott	Ireland (now Northern Ireland)	Essendon, Carlton	1899–1904	50	36
Ciarán Sheehan	Ireland	Carlton	2014–2017	6	0
Arthur Sowden	England	Melbourne	1897–1906	117	13
Ted Staniland	England	Fitzroy	1897	5	3
George Stewart	Scotland	Carlton	1909	2	0
Wilfred Stott	England	Essendon, Richmond	1913–1920	11	1
Jack Strong	Scotland	Melbourne	1901–1912	78	29
Brian Stynes	Ireland	Melbourne	1992	2	0
Jim Stynes	Ireland	Melbourne	1987–1998	264	130
George Sutherland	Scotland	St Kilda	1900–1901	16	14
Jim Tarbotton	England	Fitzroy	1923–1926	37	1
Syd Tate	England	Geelong	1947–1951	85	13
Ewan Thompson	Scotland	Richmond	1997	4	1
Anton Tohill	Ireland	Collingwood	2019–2021	1	0
Will Thursfield	England	Richmond	2005–2011	77	0
Zach Tuohy	Ireland	Carlton, Geelong	2011–2024	288	101
Tommy Walsh	Ireland	Sydney	2012–2014	5	3
Clive Waterhouse	England	Fremantle	1996–2004	106	178
Fergus Watts	England	Adelaide, St Kilda	2004–2007	6	3
Fred West	England	Hawthorn	1928–1929	12	3
Sean Wight	Scotland	Melbourne	1985–1995	150	63
Art Wilkinson	England	Collingwood, Essendon	1912–1913	13	8
Arnie Wilson	England	St Kilda	1909–1910	2	0
Josh Worrell^	England	Adelaide	2021–	55	0
Syd Young	England	South Melbourne	1941	2	0

== See also ==
- List of AFL Women's players born outside Australia
- VFL/AFL players with international backgrounds
- Australian rules football around the world
