= Alexander Robinson (disambiguation) =

Alexander Robinson (1901–1995) was a boxer, Ulster loyalist paramilitary and Ulster Special Constabulary reservist.

Alexander or Alex Robinson may also refer to:

== Sportspeople ==
- Alex Robinson (footballer) (1886–1967), Australian rules footballer and cricketer
- Alexander Robinson (cricketer, born 1924) (1924–2012), Australian cricketer
- Alexander Robinson (Costa Rican footballer) (born 1988), Costa Rican football centre-back
- Zander Robinson (born 1989), Canadian football player
- Alex Robinson (basketball) (born 1995), American basketball player

== Other people ==
- Alex Robinson (born 1969), American comic book writer and artist
- Alex J. Robinson (born 1985), country music singer/songwriter
- Alexander Robinson (chief) (1789–1872), British-Ottawa chief and fur trader who helped found Chicago
- Alexander Robinson (Medal of Honor) (1831–?), United States Navy sailor and Medal of Honor recipient
