= Holligan =

Holligan is a surname. Notable people with the surname include:

- Andy Holligan (born 1967), British boxer
- Gavin Holligan (born 1980), British soccer player and musician
- Hadan Holligan (born 1995), Barbadian association footballer
- Joe Holligan (1886–1915), Australian rules footballer
- John Holligan (1875–1939), Australian rules footballer
- Leslie Holligan (1978–2007), Guyanese soccer player
- Mick Holligan (1881–1948), Australian rules footballer
- Philip Holligan (1898–1986), British World War I flying ace
- Teddy Holligan (1878–1964), Australian rules footballer
