= Gordon Robinson (footballer) =

Australian rules footballer

Personal information
- Full name: Gordon Robinson
- Born: 12 April 1888; Brighton, Victoria
- Died: 1 November 1969 (aged 81); East Melbourne, Victoria
- Original team: Brighton (MJFA)

Playing career^{1}
Years	Club	Games (Goals)
1911	St Kilda	1 (0)
- ^{1} Playing statistics correct to the end of 1911.

Gordon Robinson (12 April 1888 – 1 November 1969) was an Australian rules footballer who played with St Kilda in the Victorian Football League (VFL).

Robinson's brothers Alex, Bill and Fred Robinson all played VFL football and his nephews Alexander William and George Robinson played first-class cricket for Western Australia.
