= Joe Marchant =

Joe Marchant may refer to:

- Joe Marchant (footballer) (1884–?), Australian rules footballer
- Joe Marchant (rugby union) (born 1996), rugby player for Harlequins and England
