= Richard Campbell =

Richard, Rich, Richie, or Dick Campbell may refer to:

== Arts and entertainment ==
- Dick Campbell (producer) (1903–1994), key figure in black theater during the Harlem Renaissance
- Dick Campbell (singer-songwriter) (1944–2002), US folk rock singer-songwriter and film producer
- Rich Campbell (streamer), a member of gaming organization One True King
- Richard Campbell (American musician) (born 1958), bass guitarist and vocalist
- Richard Campbell (English musician) (1956–2011), cellist and viol player
- Richard Campbell (The New Adventures of Old Christine), a fictional character
- Richie Campbell (actor) (born 1982), British actor
- Richie Campbell (singer) (born 1986), singer of reggae, dancehall, ska and soul music from Portugal

== Politics, government, and law ==
- Dick Campbell (public servant) (1897–1974), New Zealand economist, civil servant, and diplomat
- Richard Campbell (Liberal MP) (1831–1888), MP for Ayr Burghs
- Richard H. Campbell, American politician
- Richard Vary Campbell (1840–1901), Scottish advocate and author of legal books

== Sports ==
- Dick Campbell (Australian footballer) (1884–1949), Australian rules footballer
- Dick Campbell (speedway rider) (1923–1990), New Zealand speedway rider
- Dick Campbell (American football) (born 1935), former linebacker in the National Football League
- Dick Campbell (footballer, born 1953), Scottish association football manager and former player
- Rich Campbell (American football) (born 1958), former National Football League quarterback
- Richie Campbell (water polo) (born 1987), Australian water polo player

== Other ==
- Richard Campbell (priest) (1844–1913), Dean of Clonmacnoise
