= Vollugi =

Vollugi is a surname. Notable people with the surname include:

- Ernie Vollugi (1879–1964), Australian rules footballer
- Herc Vollugi (1880–1960), Australian rules footballer
