= Bryan Martin =

Bryan Martin may refer to:

- Bryan Martin (footballer), Australian football player
- Bryan Martin (singer), American singer
