= Gordon Robinson =

Gordon Robinson may refer to:

- Gordon Robinson (Sesame Street), a character on the children's television series Sesame Street
- Gordon Robinson (footballer) (1888–1969), Australian rules footballer
