= List of University Football Club captains =

This is a list of all captains of the University Football Club, an Australian rules football club that formerly participated in the Victorian Football League.

Dates	Captain(s)	Notes
1908	Tom Fogarty	
1909	Harry Cordner	
1910	Edgar Kneen	
1911–1912	George Elliott	
1913	Herbert Hurrey	
1914	Jack West	
