= Alex Robinson (footballer) =

Australian rules footballer and coach

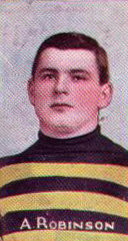

Personal information
- Full name: Alexander Robinson
- Born: 19 August 1886; Brighton, Victoria
- Died: 4 October 1967 (aged 81); Perth, Western Australia
- Original team: Brighton Juniors

Playing career^{1}
Years	Club	Games (Goals)
1904	Essendon	9 (5)

Coaching career
Years	Club	Games (W–L–D)
1928–1929	Subiaco	38 (19–19–0)
- ^{1} Playing statistics correct to the end of 1904.

Alexander Robinson (19 August 1886 – 4 October 1967) was an Australian rules footballer who played for Essendon in the Victorian Football League (VFL). He also had a noted football career in Western Australia, during which time he became a first-class cricketer for the state team.

== Early years in Victoria ==
One of four Robinson brothers to play in the VFL, he was just 17 when he played for Essendon in the 1904 VFL season. Robinson, who was a former Brighton junior, played nine games over the course of the year. Eight of those games were with brothers Bill and Fred Robinson. His other sibling was Gordon Robinson, who made a single appearance for St Kilda in 1911.

Robinson had two sons, Alexander William and George, who both played first-class cricket in Western Australia.

== Goldfields football ==
A follower, Robinson later moved to Western Australia and played football for Boulder City in the Goldfields Football League. He was the league's best player award winner in 1907 and a member of five premiership teams.

He represented Western Australia in the 1908 Melbourne Carnival, withdrew from the 1911 Adelaide Carnival through injury and represented the state once more at the 1914 Sydney Carnivals.

== Cricket ==
Robinson was a right handed middle order batsman who batted at four in his only first-class match, which was played against the touring Marylebone Cricket Club of England in 1907/08. Playing on the Western Australia Cricket Association Ground, Robinson scored 23 in the first innings and just one in the second. He was dismissed by English Test cricketer Jack Crawford both times.

== Coaching career ==
Robinson was appointed senior coach of Subiaco, in the West Australian Football League, for the 1928 season and remained there for two years. In his first season in charge he guided the club to third position and in 1929 steered them to fourth.

== See also ==
- 1908 Melbourne Carnival
- List of Western Australia first-class cricketers
