= Allan Edwards (Australian cricketer) =

Australian cricketer (1921–2019)

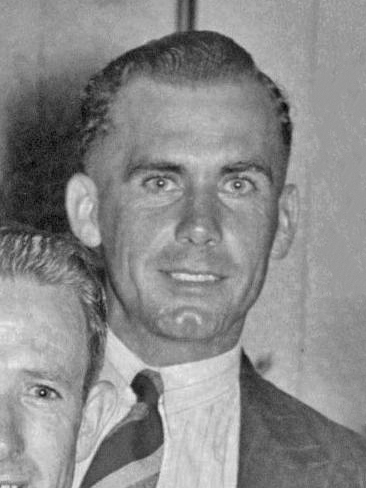
- Edwards in 1948

Personal information
- Full name: Allan Robert Edwards
- Born: 24 December 1921; Perth, Western Australia
- Died: 30 May 2019 (aged 97); Perth, Western Australia
- Batting: Left-handed
- Bowling: Slow left-arm orthodox

Domestic team information
- Years: Team
- 1946/47–1956/57: Western Australia

Career statistics
| Competition | First-class |
|---|---|
| Matches | 45 |
| Runs scored | 2,370 |
| Batting average | 32.46 |
| 100s/50s | 3/13 |
| Top score | 105 |
| Balls bowled | 685 |
| Wickets | 14 |
| Bowling average | 24.71 |
| 5 wickets in innings | 0 |
| 10 wickets in match | 0 |
| Best bowling | 4/54 |
| Catches/stumpings | 34/– |
- Source: Cricinfo, 22 March 2017

Allan Robert Edwards (24 December 1921 – 30 May 2019) was an Australian cricketer. He played 45 first-class matches for Western Australia between 1946 and 1957.

At Christian Brothers' College, Perth, Edwards was a champion schoolboy cricketer, scoring five centuries in consecutive innings in 1940. He served in Borneo during World War II with the British Borneo Civil Affairs Unit, receiving his discharge in 1946.

When Western Australia was admitted to the Sheffield Shield in 1947/48 he opened the team's first innings and scored 105 in the second match against Victoria, adding 190 for the second wicket with George Robinson. He was the first batsman to score a century in each innings of a match for Western Australia, which he did against Queensland in 1950/51.

He served on Western Australia's selection panel from 1960/61 to 1987/88, and was chairman from 1967/68 to 1987/88. Western Australia won the Sheffield Shield 10 times during the 21 seasons of his chairmanship. He returned to the panel for one more season in 2001/02.

Edwards died in Perth in May 2019 aged 97.
