= Syd Bradley =

Australian rules footballer

Personal information
- Full name: Sydney Cousins Bradley
- Born: 8 March 1880; Coburg, Victoria
- Died: 25 November 1948 (aged 68); Brunswick East, Victoria
- Original team: North Melbourne (VFA) / Hawthorn (MJFA)

Playing career^{1}
Years	Club	Games (Goals)
1909	St Kilda	1 (1)
- ^{1} Playing statistics correct to the end of 1909.

Sydney Cousins Bradley (8 March 1880 – 25 November 1948) was an Australian rules footballer who played with St Kilda in the Victorian Football League (VFL). His brother Rupe Bradley played for Carlton.
