= Jack Julian =

Australian rules footballer

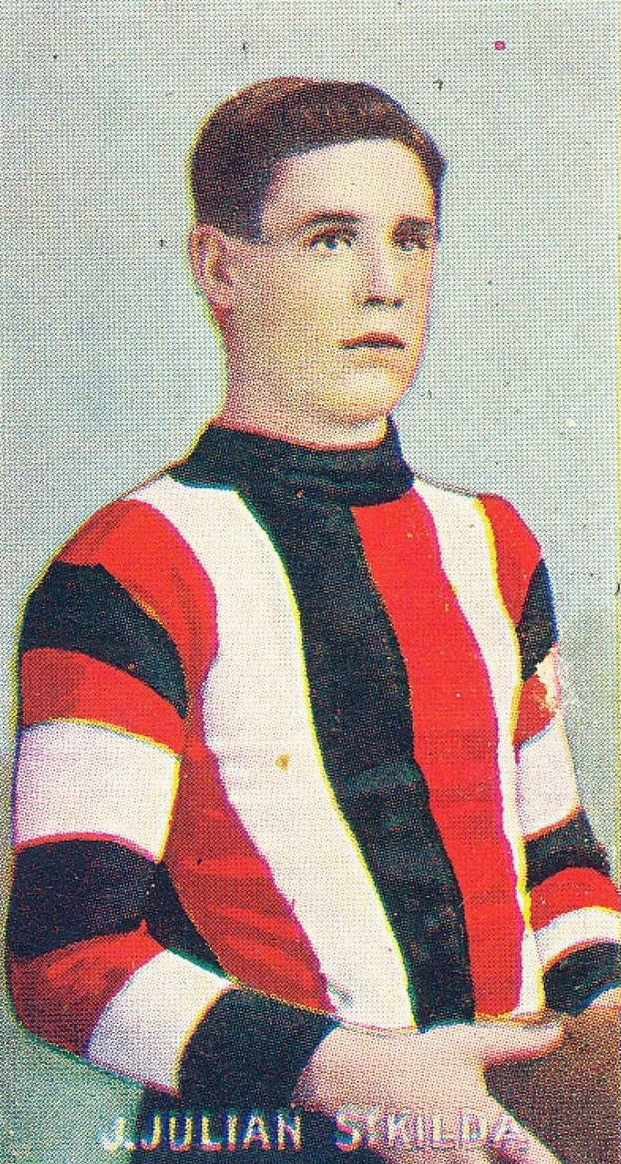
- Cigarette card of Julian in 1907

Personal information
- Full name: John Moore Julian
- Born: 14 February 1885; Melbourne, Victoria
- Died: 25 August 1933 (aged 48); Manangatang, Victoria
- Original team: Grosvenor
- Position: Defence

Playing career^{1}
| Years | Club | Games (Goals) |
| 1904–08 | St Kilda | 67 (0) |
- ^{1} Playing statistics correct to the end of 1908.

John Moore Julian (14 February 1885 – 25 August 1933) was an Australian rules footballer who played with St Kilda in the Victorian Football League (VFL).
