= Frank Kenny =

Australian rules footballer

Personal information
- Full name: Francis Kenny
- Born: 9 August 1878; Emerald Hill, Victoria
- Died: 26 April 1930 (aged 51); Melbourne, Victoria
- Original team: South Melbourne Jnrs

Playing career^{1}
Years	Club	Games (Goals)
1904	St Kilda	2 (0)
- ^{1} Playing statistics correct to the end of 1904.

Francis Kenny (9 August 1878 – 26 April 1930) was an Australian rules footballer who played with St Kilda in the Victorian Football League (VFL).

== Career ==
Kenny, a South Melbourne junior, made two appearances for St Kilda, in the 1904 VFL season. He debuted in St Kilda's round 15 loss to Melbourne at the Melbourne Cricket Ground. The following week he played against Collingwood at Junction Oval, in a 61-point loss.

Also a district cricketer for South Melbourne, Kenny played several cricket matches alongside his twin brother Arthur, a Victorian first-class cricketer. It is said that their identical appearances used to confuse opposition players, when one of them came in to bat after another had earlier been dismissed.

== Assault and death ==
Kenny suffered a fractured skull in an assault outside Flinders Street station on 23 April 1930 and died of his injuries in Royal Melbourne Hospital three days later. He had been selling race cards to passers-by and got into an argument with a rival vendor, Francis Edwards, who struck him. As a result of the inquest, Edwards was charged with manslaughter.
