= David Starke =

Australian rules footballer

Personal information
- Full name: David James Stark
- Born: 15 September 1879; South Melbourne, Victoria
- Died: 11 December 1954 (aged 75); Brighton East, Victoria
- Original team: South Melbourne Juniors

Playing career^{1}
Years	Club	Games (Goals)
1904	St Kilda	1 (0)
- ^{1} Playing statistics correct to the end of 1904.

David Starke (15 September 1879 – 11 December 1954) was an Australian rules footballer who played with St Kilda in the Victorian Football League (VFL).
