= Eric Needham =

Australian rules footballer, born 1913

Personal information
- Full name: Eric Laurence Needham
- Born: 7 June 1913; Plaistow, West Sussex, England
- Died: 8 May 2000 (aged 86); Berwick, Victoria
- Original team: Caulfield
- Height: 179 cm (5 ft 10 in)
- Weight: 74 kg (163 lb)

Playing career^{1}
Years	Club	Games (Goals)
1933	St Kilda	1 (0)
- ^{1} Playing statistics correct to the end of 1933.

Eric Laurence Needham (7 June 1913 – 8 May 2000) was an Australian rules footballer who played with St Kilda in the Victorian Football League (VFL).
