= Alexander Robinson (Medal of Honor) =

American Civil War Medal of Honor recipient

Boatswain Mate Alexander Robinson
- Born: c. 1831; England
- Military career
- Allegiance: United States (Union)
- Branch: Navy
- Rank: Boatswain's Mate
- Unit: USS Howquah
- Awards: Medal of Honor

Alexander Robinson (born c. 1831) was a boatswain's mate of the United States Navy who was awarded the Medal of Honor for gallantry during the American Civil War. He was awarded the medal on 31 December 1864 for actions performed near Wilmington, North Carolina on 25 September 1864.

== Personal life ==
Not much is known about Robinson's personal life. He is believed to have been born in about 1831 in England. His home of record was listed as New York, New York.

== Military service ==
Robinson enlisted as a boatswain's mate in New York City. He was assigned to the USS Howquah, a screw steamer commissioned the previous year to protect Union shipping. On 25 September 1864, while enforcing a naval blockade near Wilmington, North Carolina, the Howquah was caught in the crossfire between Union ships and Confederate shore batteries.

Robinson's Medal of Honor citation, which describes these events, reads:

The President of the United States of America, in the name of Congress, takes pleasure in presenting the Medal of Honor to Boatswain's Mate Alexander Robinson, United States Navy, for extraordinary heroism in action while serving as Boatswain's Mate on board the U.S.S. Howquah on the occasion of the destruction of the blockade runner, Lynx, off Wilmington, North Carolina, 25 September 1864. Performing his duty faithfully under the most trying circumstances, Boatswain's Mate Robinson stood firmly at his post in the midst of a crossfire from the rebel shore batteries and our own vessels.

— E. M. Stanton, Secretary of War

Robinson was not presented with the award until 25 August 1868.
