= Jack Southern =

Australian rules footballer

Personal information
- Full name: John Southern
- Born: 2 May 1874; Dunedin, New Zealand
- Died: 8 March 1919 (aged 44); Ascot Vale, Victoria

Playing career^{1}
Years	Club	Games (Goals)
1897–1899	South Melbourne	31 (3)
- ^{1} Playing statistics correct to the end of 1899.

Jack Southern (2 May 1874 – 8 March 1919) was an Australian rules footballer who played for the South Melbourne Football Club in the Victorian Football League (VFL).

== Family ==
The son of John Southern (1844–1891), and Elizabeth Jane Southern (1847-1877), née Timpson, was born at Dunedin, New Zealand on 2 May 1874.

He married Katherine Parnell Whitty (1876–1953) on 9 August 1899.

== Football ==
He played for two seasons — 1895 and 1896 — in South Melbourne's VFA team, including when he played on the wing in the play-off match against Collingwood, at the East Melbourne Cricket Ground, on 3 October 1896,

He made his debut for South Melbourne in the team's first match in the VFL competition against Melbourne, at the Lake Oval, on 8 May 1897.

== Death ==
He died at Ascot Vale, Victoria on 8 March 1919.
