= George Doull =

Australian rules footballer

Personal information
- Full name: George Doull
- Born: 25 December 1879; Geelong, Victoria
- Died: 13 November 1962 (aged 82); Geelong, Victoria
- Original team: Preston
- Position: Wing / Half Forward

Playing career^{1}
Years	Club	Games (Goals)
1904–11	Geelong	96 (16)
- ^{1} Playing statistics correct to the end of 1911.

George Doull (25 December 1879 – 13 November 1962) was an Australian rules footballer who played with Geelong in the Victorian Football League (VFL).
