= Artie Machin =

Australian rules footballer

Personal information
- Full name: Arthur Machin
- Born: 1 September 1874; Timaru, New Zealand
- Died: 30 January 1941 (aged 66); Prahran, Victoria

Playing career^{1}
Years	Club	Games (Goals)
1898	South Melbourne	3 (0)
- ^{1} Playing statistics correct to the end of 1898.

Artie Machin (1 September 1874 – 30 January 1941) was an Australian rules footballer who played for the South Melbourne Football Club in the Victorian Football League (VFL).
