= Percy Pitt (footballer) =

Australian rules footballer

Personal information
- Full name: Percival Cyril Pitt
- Born: 8 September 1883; North Melbourne, Victoria
- Died: 30 June 1968 (aged 84); Thornbury, Victoria
- Original team: Essendon Town
- Height: 173 cm (5 ft 8 in)
- Weight: 71 kg (157 lb)

Playing career^{1}
Years	Club	Games (Goals)
190	Carlton	8 (11)
- ^{1} Playing statistics correct to the end of 1905.

Percival Cyril Pitt (8 September 1883 – 30 June 1968) was an Australian rules footballer who played with Carlton in the Victorian Football League (VFL).
