= John Catarinich =

Australian rules footballer

Personal information
- Full name: John Charles Catarinich
- Born: 13 November 1882; Melbourne, Victoria
- Died: 8 October 1974 (aged 91); Kew, Victoria
- Original team: South Melbourne CYMS (CYMSFA)

Playing career^{1}
Years	Club	Games (Goals)
1904–05	South Melbourne	7 (0)
- ^{1} Playing statistics correct to the end of 1905.

John Charles Catarinich (13 November 1882 – 8 October 1974) was an Australian rules footballer who played with the former South Melbourne club in the Victorian Football League (VFL).
