= Bart Dinsmore =

Australian rules footballer

Personal information
- Full name: Bartley Stone Dinsmore
- Born: 17 November 1879; Glasgow, Scotland
- Died: 27 January 1970 (aged 90); Caulfield, Victoria
- Original team: Collegians / Wesley College

Playing career^{1}
Years	Club	Games (Goals)
1903	St Kilda	2 (3)
- ^{1} Playing statistics correct to the end of 1903.

Bartley Stone Dinsmore (17 November 1879 – 27 January 1970) was an Australian rules footballer who played for the St Kilda Football Club in the Victorian Football League (VFL).
