= Herb Bruton =

Australian rules footballer

Personal information
- Full name: Herbert James Bruton
- Born: 27 May 1880; Barnawartha, Victoria
- Died: 8 November 1926 (aged 46); Drummoyne, New South Wales
- Original team: Tallangatta

Playing career^{1}
Years	Club	Games (Goals)
1904	South Melbourne	2 (0)
- ^{1} Playing statistics correct to the end of 1904.

Herbert James Bruton (27 May 1880 – 8 November 1926) was an Australian rules footballer who played with South Melbourne in the Victorian Football League (VFL).
