= Eric Vinar =

Australian rules footballer

Personal information
- Full name: Eric Richard Vinar
- Born: 31 May 1941; Prague, Czechoslovakia
- Died: 13 February 2016 (aged 74); Tasmania, Australia
- Original team: North Ballarat
- Height: 178 cm (5 ft 10 in)
- Weight: 80 kg (176 lb)

Playing career^{1}
Years	Club	Games (Goals)
1964	Fitzroy	8 (3)
- ^{1} Playing statistics correct to the end of 1964.

Eric Richard Vinar (31 May 1941 – 13 February 2016) was an Australian rules footballer who played with Fitzroy in the Victorian Football League (VFL).

Born in Czechoslovakia during World War II, Vinar and his family emigrated to Australia several years after the conflict, which had claimed the life of his father. The family settled in Geelong.

Vinar played senior football for North Ballarat, before joining Fitzroy in the 1964 VFL season. He played eight senior games for Fitzroy that year. All were in losses, it was the only winless season in the club's history.

His brother, Paul Vinar, was a member of Geelong's 1963 VFL premiership team.
