= Bob Kenny =

Australian rules footballer

Personal information
- Full name: Robert Glasby Kenny
- Born: 24 February 1876; Carrickmacross, Ireland
- Died: 4 May 1940 (aged 64); Cockatoo, Victoria

Playing career^{1}
Years	Club	Games (Goals)
1899	St Kilda	2 (0)
- ^{1} Playing statistics correct to the end of 1899.

Robert Glasby Kenny (24 February 1876 – 4 May 1940) was an Australian rules footballer who played with St Kilda in the Victorian Football League (VFL).

He was the first player recruited from a Sydney-based club to the VFL.

He later served in the Navy in World War I.
