= Des Griffin (footballer) =

Australian rules footballer (1882–1969)

Personal information
- Full name: Denis Matthew Griffin
- Born: 26 June 1882; Pyalong
- Died: 9 July 1969 (aged 87); Fitzroy, Victoria
- Original team: Pyalong

Playing career^{1}
| Years | Club | Games (Goals) |
| 1904 | St Kilda | 1 (0) |
| 1905 | South Melbourne | 1 (0) |
| Total | | 2 (0) |
- ^{1} Playing statistics correct to the end of 1905.

Denis Matthew Griffin (26 June 1882 – 9 July 1969) was an Australian rules football player who played with St Kilda and South Melbourne in the Victorian Football League (VFL).
