= Peter Agrums =

Australian rules footballer

Personal information
- Nickname: Peter Agrums
- Born: 22 September 1940 (age 86); Latvian SSR
- Original team: Golden Point
- Height: 193 cm (6 ft 4 in)
- Weight: 83 kg (183 lb)
- Position: Ruck

Playing career^{1}
Years	Club	Games (Goals)
1963–1964	North Melbourne	11 (4)
- ^{1} Playing statistics correct to the end of 1964.

Peter Agrums (born 22 September 1940) is a former Australian rules football player who played eleven games for North Melbourne in the Victorian Football League (VFL) between 1963 and 1964. He played as a ruckman and was recruited from Golden Point. In 1975, he became the coach of the University of Wollongong football team.
