= Leslie Hope (footballer) =

Australian rules footballer (1884–1943)

Personal information
- Full name: Leslie Park Hope
- Born: 25 October 1884; North Melbourne, Victoria
- Died: 12 October 1943 (aged 58); Footscray, Victoria

Playing career^{1}
Years	Club	Games (Goals)
1904	South Melbourne	1 (0)
- ^{1} Playing statistics correct to the end of 1904.

Leslie Park Hope (25 October 1884 – 12 October 1943) was an Australian rules footballer who played with South Melbourne in the Victorian Football League (VFL).
