= Fred Whelpton =

Australian rules footballer

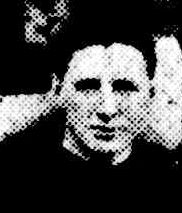

Personal information
- Full name: Frederick David Whelpton
- Born: 11 March 1885; Richmond, Victoria
- Died: 28 January 1965 (aged 79); Mornington, Victoria
- Original team: South Yarra
- Height: 174 cm (5 ft 9 in)
- Weight: 64 kg (141 lb)

Playing career^{1}
Years	Club	Games (Goals)
1904	St Kilda	2 (0)
1909–10	Essendon	10 (5)
1910–11	Melbourne	6 (0)
Total		18 (5)
- ^{1} Playing statistics correct to the end of 1911.

Frederick David Whelpton (11 March 1885 – 28 January 1965) was a former Australian rules footballer who played with St Kilda, Essendon and Melbourne in the Victorian Football League (VFL).
