= Joe Holligan =

Australian rules footballer

Personal information
- Full name: Joseph Christopher Holligan
- Born: 29 January 1886; Geelong, Victoria
- Died: 21 May 1915 (aged 29); Geelong, Victoria
- Original team: Northcote

Playing career^{1}
Years	Club	Games (Goals)
1913	Geelong	2 (0)
- ^{1} Playing statistics correct to the end of 1913.

Joseph Christopher Holligan (29 January 1886 – 21 May 1915) was an Australian rules footballer who played with Geelong in the Victorian Football League (VFL).

Holligan worked as a shunter at the Geelong railway yards and was killed in an accident on 21 May 1915 when he was struck by a train.
