= Nick Marshall (Australian footballer) =

Australian rules footballer (1875–1948)

Personal information
- Full name: Nicholas Marshall
- Born: 28 November 1875; St Mawgan, Cornwall, England
- Died: 12 August 1948 (aged 72); Glen Iris, Victoria

Playing career^{1}
Years	Club	Games (Goals)
1907–08	Geelong	4 (0)
- ^{1} Playing statistics correct to the end of 1908.

Nick Marshall (28 November 1875 – 12 August 1948) was an Australian rules footballer who played with Geelong in the Victorian Football League (VFL).
