= Henry Whight =

Australian rules footballer

Personal information
- Full name: Henry Francis Whight
- Born: 11 March 1882; Cheltenham, Victoria
- Died: 12 March 1926 (aged 44); Heidelberg, Victoria
- Original team: Footscray (VFA)

Playing career^{1}
Years	Club	Games (Goals)
1904	Carlton	7 (0)
- ^{1} Playing statistics correct to the end of 1904.

Henry Francis Whight (11 March 1882 – 12 March 1926) was an Australian rules footballer who played with Carlton in the Victorian Football League (VFL).

== Family ==
The son of William Frederick Whight (1855–1938), and Charlotte Eliza Whight (1858–1939), née Smith, Henry Francis Whight was born at Cheltenham, Victoria on 11 March 1882.

He married Agnes Janet Morton Addis (1883–1961) in 1905.

== Football ==
=== Carlton (VFL) ===
In June 1904 he was cleared from Footscray to Carlton.

=== Williamstown (VFA) ===
In May 1905 he was cleared from Carlton to Yarraville Britannia.

In May 1906 he was cleared from Carlton to Williamstown.

== Death ==
He died at the Austin Hospital, Heidelberg on 12 March 1926.
