= Jack Knell =

Australian rules footballer

Personal information
- Full name: Jack Knell
- Born: 10 July 1878
- Died: 5 August 1952 (aged 74)
- Original team: Preston

Playing career^{1}
Years	Club	Games (Goals)
1904–06	Geelong	32 (12)
- ^{1} Playing statistics correct to the end of 1906.

Jack Knell (10 July 1878 – 5 August 1952) was an Australian rules footballer who played with Geelong in the Victorian Football League (VFL).
