= Peter McMurrich =

Australian rules footballer

Personal information
- Full name: Peter James McMurrich
- Born: 12 May 1886; Geelong, Victoria
- Died: 20 February 1960 (aged 73); Birregurra, Victoria
- Original team: Barwon

Playing career^{1}
Years	Club	Games (Goals)
1904	Geelong	1 (0)
- ^{1} Playing statistics correct to the end of 1904.

Peter James McMurrich (12 May 1886 – 20 February 1960) was an Australian rules footballer who played with Geelong in the Victorian Football League (VFL).
