= Jim Conquest =

Australian rules footballer

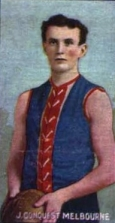

Personal information
- Full name: James Conquest
- Born: 30 May 1880; Malvern, Victoria
- Died: 26 April 1960 (aged 79); Murrumbeena, Victoria
- Original team: Prahran
- Position: Rover/Half forward

Playing career^{1}
Years	Club	Games (Goals)
1904–08	Melbourne	53 (22)
- ^{1} Playing statistics correct to the end of 1908.

Jim Conquest (30 May 1880 – 26 April 1960) was an Australian rules footballer who played with Melbourne in the Victorian Football League (VFL).
