= Bob Svorinich =

Australian rules footballer

Personal information
- Full name: Mauro Paul Robert Svorinich
- Born: 14 April 1950; Free Territory of Trieste
- Died: 27 May 2021 (aged 71); Geelong, Victoria
- Original team: Altona High School
- Height: 180 cm (5 ft 11 in)
- Weight: 77 kg (170 lb)
- Position: Half Forward

Playing career^{1}
Years	Club	Games (Goals)
1969, 1971	South Melbourne	8 (7)
- ^{1} Playing statistics correct to the end of 1971.

Mauro Paul Robert Svorinich (14 April 1950 – 27 May 2021) was an Australian rules footballer who played with South Melbourne in the Victorian Football League (VFL).
