= Bill Ahern (footballer, born 1865) =

Australian rules footballer

Personal information
- Full name: William Joseph Ahern
- Born: 2 March 1865; County Cork, Ireland
- Died: 26 May 1938 (aged 73); Prahran, Victoria
- Original team: Preston (VFA)
- Position: Ruck

Playing career^{1}
Years	Club	Games (Goals)
1897	Carlton	1 (0)
- ^{1} Playing statistics correct to the end of 1897.

William Joseph Ahern (2 March 1865 – 26 May 1938) was an Australian rules footballer who played one game for Carlton in the first season of the Victorian Football League (VFL) in 1897.

For many years he was believed to have been born in 1873 but this was found to be incorrect in 2016.
