= Bill Mearns =

Australian rules footballer

Personal information
- Full name: William Lind Mearns
- Born: 4 May 1885; Tokatoka, New Zealand
- Died: 3 June 1948 (aged 63); Maryborough, Victoria
- Original team: Port Melbourne

Playing career^{1}
Years	Club	Games (Goals)
1910	St Kilda	3 (1)
- ^{1} Playing statistics correct to the end of 1910.

William Lind Mearns (4 May 1885 – 3 June 1948) was an Australian rules footballer who played with St Kilda in the Victorian Football League (VFL).
