= Peter Castrikum =

Australian rules footballer

Personal information
- Full name: Peter Castrikum
- Born: 25 February 1943; Bandung, Indonesia
- Died: 22 July 2015 (aged 72); Lismore, New South Wales
- Original team: Melton
- Height: 183 cm (6 ft 0 in)
- Weight: 76 kg (168 lb)

Playing career^{1}
Years	Club	Games (Goals)
1965	Footscray	6 (0)
- ^{1} Playing statistics correct to the end of 1965.

Peter Castrikum (25 February 1943 – 22 July 2015) was an Australian rules footballer who played with Footscray in the Victorian Football League (VFL).

He was born to Dutch parents in a Japanese Prisoner of War (POW) camp in Bandung, Indonesia and moved to Australia in 1954 with his family. He died in 2015 after being diagnosed with motor neuron disease.
