= Wally Sykes =

Australian rules footballer (1881–1967)

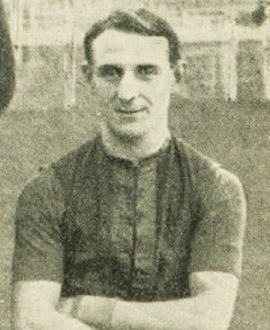
- Sykes in 1904

Personal information
- Full name: Walter Frederick Victor Sykes
- Born: 2 May 1881; Fitzroy, Victoria
- Died: 4 October 1967 (aged 86); Queensland
- Original team: Fitzroy Baptists

Playing career^{1}
Years	Club	Games (Goals)
1904	Collingwood	2 (0)
1907–12	Melbourne	41 (17)
Total		43 (17)
- ^{1} Playing statistics correct to the end of 1912.

Walter Frederick Victor Sykes (2 May 1881 – 4 October 1967) was an Australian rules footballer who played with Collingwood and Melbourne in the Victorian Football League (VFL).
