= Joe O'Grady =

Australian rules footballer

Personal information
- Full name: Patrick Joseph O'Grady
- Born: 15 September 1872; Kilkelly, Ireland
- Died: 28 May 1899 (aged 26); Richmond, Victoria

Playing career^{1}
Years	Club	Games (Goals)
1897	St Kilda	9 (0)
- ^{1} Playing statistics correct to the end of 1897.

Patrick Joseph O'Grady (15 September 1872 – 28 May 1899) was an Australian rules footballer who played with St Kilda in the Victorian Football League (VFL).
