= John Holligan =

Australian rules footballer

Personal information
- Full name: John Francis Holligan
- Born: 1 November 1875; Geelong, Victoria
- Died: 13 September 1939 (aged 63); Kew, Victoria
- Original team: Marylebone

Playing career^{1}
Years	Club	Games (Goals)
1902–03	Essendon	5 (4)
- ^{1} Playing statistics correct to the end of 1903.

John Francis Holligan (1 November 1875 – 13 September 1939) was an Australian rules footballer who played with Essendon in the Victorian Football League (VFL).

== Family ==
The son of Michael Holligan, and Mary Holligan (1852–1906), née M‘Garity, John Francis Holligan was born in Geelong on 1 November 1875.
