= Bill Johnstone (footballer, born 1919) =

Australian rules footballer, born 1919

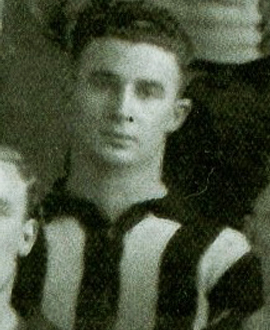
- Johnstone in 1941

Personal information
- Full name: William Johnstone
- Born: 9 March 1919; Dumfries, Scotland
- Died: 4 April 1976 (aged 57); Prahran, Victoria
- Original team: Abbotsford
- Height: 177 cm (5 ft 10 in)
- Weight: 80 kg (176 lb)

Playing career^{1}
Years	Club	Games (Goals)
1941	Collingwood	2 (0)
- ^{1} Playing statistics correct to the end of 1941.

Bill Johnstone (9 March 1919 – 4 April 1976) was an Australian rules footballer who played with Collingwood in the Victorian Football League (VFL).
