= Edgar Kneen =

Australian rules footballer

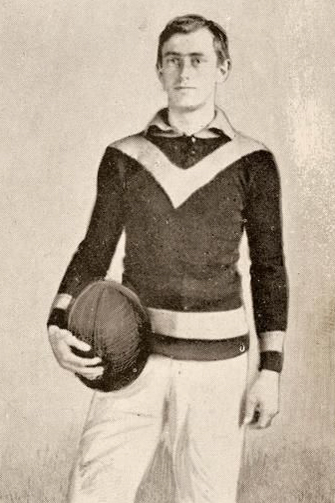
- Kneen in 1910

Personal information
- Full name: Edgar Albert Kneen
- Born: 9 September 1882; Fitzroy, Victoria
- Died: 24 April 1962 (aged 79); Mont Albert, Victoria
- Original team: Boroondara

Playing career^{1}
Years	Club	Games (Goals)
1904–06	Fitzroy	48 (33)
1908–12	University	46 (48)
Total		94 (81)

International team honours^{2}
Years	Team	Games (Goals)
1905	Victoria	
- ^{1} Playing statistics correct to the end of 1912.^{2} Representative statistics correct as of N/A.

Career highlights
- VFL premiership player: 1904; University captain: 1910

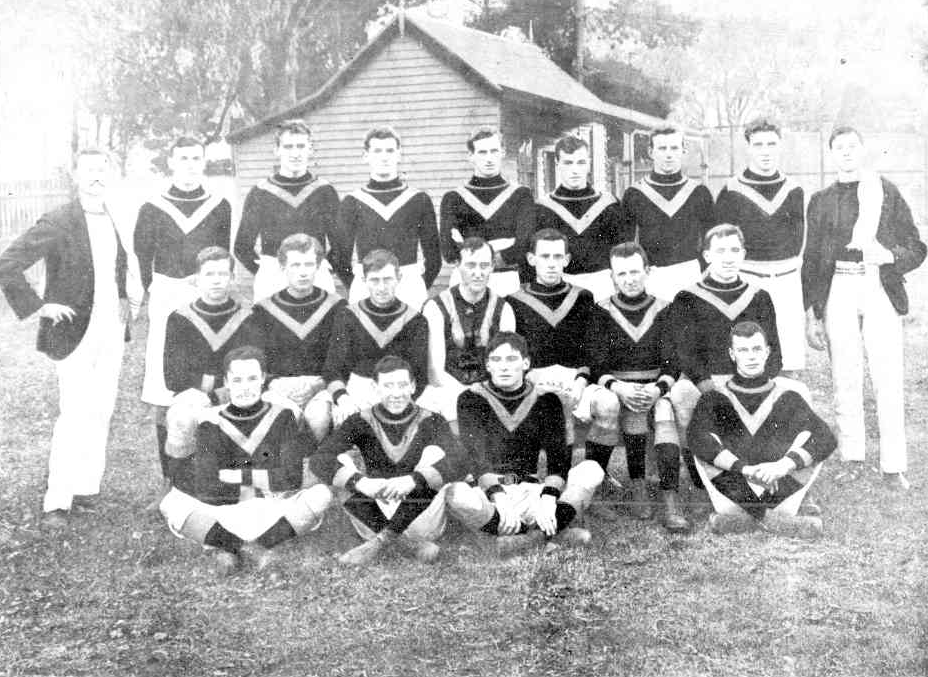
University VFL Team: 23 May 1908: E. Kneen, third from left, middle row.

Edgar Albert Kneen (9 September 1882 – 24 April 1962) was an Australian rules footballer who played for the Fitzroy Football Club and Melbourne University Football Club.

== Football ==
He captained University in 1910 and was a member of the 1904 Fitzroy premiership side.

== Death ==
Kneen died in April 1962 and was buried in the Cheltenham Pioneer Cemetery, Charman Road on 26 April.
