= 1928 WAFL season =

Australian rules football season

- Teams: 7
- Premiers: East Fremantle; 13th premiership
- Minor premiers: East Fremantle; 15th minor premiership
- Sandover Medallist: Jack Rocchi (South Fremantle)
- Bernie Naylor Medallist: Sol Lawn (South Fremantle)
- Matches played: 67

The 1928 WAFL season was the 44th season of the West Australian Football League. The most notable event of the season occurred off the field on Monday, 11 June, when champion East Perth coach Phil Matson was killed in a truck crash at Nedlands after being thrown into a telegraph post. The Royals under the coaching of Paddy Hebbard did manage to reach a challenge final against minor premiers East Fremantle, but were beaten and suffered an abrupt fall to a clear last the following season.

Old Easts, who were given consecutive byes in the second half of July to permit a tour of Tasmania and Victoria, were fourth upon returning to Perth but claimed top place two weeks later and after four losses to the Royals, beat them in the challenge final for the first of their second series of four successive premierships.

Fledgling club Claremont-Cottesloe (at this stage frequently called "the combine") failed to move from the bottom in its third season but nonetheless improved greatly from one win to five, in the process discovering their first great players in George Moloney and Keith Hough. A prelude to the future for the Tigers and indeed the entire WAFL was the first Aboriginal player in the league, Maley Hayward from Tambellup, who played with his two brothers for South Fremantle as late as 1937.

== Home-and-Away season ==
=== Round 1 ===
	Round 1
Saturday, 28 April (2:45 pm)	West Perth 8.9 (57)	def. by	Perth 14.17 (101)	Leederville Oval
Saturday, 28 April (2:45 pm)	East Fremantle 8.20 (68)	def.	Subiaco 8.12 (60)	Fremantle Oval
Saturday, 28 April (2:45 pm)	East Perth 13.14 (92)	def.	Claremont-Cottesloe 9.9 (63)	Perth Oval
	Bye; South Fremantle

=== Round 2 ===
	Round 2
Saturday, 5 May (2:45 pm)	South Fremantle 12.18 (90)	def.	Perth 11.14 (80)	Fremantle Oval
Saturday, 5 May (2:45 pm)	Claremont-Cottesloe 10.14 (74)	def. by	East Fremantle 14.12 (96)	Claremont Oval
Saturday, 5 May (2:45 pm)	Subiaco 15.15 (105)	def.	West Perth 8.14 (62)	Subiaco Oval
	Bye; East Perth

=== Round 3 ===
	Round 3
Saturday, 12 May (2:45 pm)	East Fremantle 14.22 (106)	def.	South Fremantle 10.11 (71)	Fremantle Oval
Saturday, 12 May (2:45 pm)	East Perth 8.7 (55)	def.	West Perth 7.4 (46)	Perth Oval
Saturday, 12 May (2:45 pm)	Perth 12.14 (86)	def.	Claremont-Cottesloe 11.10 (76)	WACA
	Bye; Subiaco
During the last quarter, umpire Collins takes the rare step of temporarily suspending the Perth versus Claremont-Cottesloe game to cool tempers after numerous fights.

=== Round 4 ===
	Round 4
Saturday, 19 May (2:45 pm)	Claremont-Cottesloe 7.5 (47)	def. by	Subiaco 14.12 (96)	Claremont Oval
Saturday, 19 May (2:45 pm)	West Perth 8.9 (57)	def.	East Fremantle 7.12 (54)	Leederville Oval
Saturday, 19 May (2:45 pm)	South Fremantle 8.9 (57)	def.	East Perth 6.10 (46)	Fremantle Oval
	Bye; Perth
On the first rainy day of what became an exceptionally wet season, South Fremantle reverse the 1927 Grand Final result with a 5.5 (35) to 0.3 (3) first quarter.; West Perth hold on for their first win after East Fremantle's Brown fails to hold a difficult mark.

=== Round 5 ===
	Round 5
Saturday, 26 May (2:45 pm)	East Perth 10.5 (65)	def.	East Fremantle 6.11 (47)	Perth Oval
Saturday, 26 May (2:45 pm)	South Fremantle 8.15 (63)	def.	West Perth 7.13 (55)	Fremantle Oval
Saturday, 26 May (2:45 pm)	Subiaco 13.10 (88)	def.	Perth 10.11 (71)	Subiaco Oval
	Bye; Claremont-Cottesloe
An extremely windy afternoon sees East Perth inflict a second defeat on Old Easts, whilst Subiaco moves to second by kicking three goals into a gale against Perth.

=== Round 6 ===
	Round 6
Saturday, 2 June (2:45 pm)	South Fremantle 10.14 (74)	def. by	Subiaco 11.10 (76)	Fremantle Oval
Saturday, 2 June (2:45 pm)	Perth 14.3 (87)	def.	East Perth 11.14 (80)	WACA
Saturday, 2 June (2:45 pm)	West Perth 13.17 (95)	def. by	Claremont-Cottesloe 15.16 (106)	Leederville Oval
	Bye; East Fremantle
Subiaco move to top of the ladder with a thrilling win at Fremantle Oval.; Perth kick the most accurate score in WANFL history since West Perth kicked 13.2 (80) against the Demons in 1902.

=== Round 7 (Foundation Day) ===
	Round 7
Monday, 4 June (2:45 pm)	Subiaco 14.11 (95)	def.	East Perth 13.8 (86)	Subiaco Oval
Monday, 4 June (2:45 pm)	Claremont-Cottesloe 13.10 (88)	def.	South Fremantle 11.12 (78)	Claremont Oval
Monday, 4 June (2:45 pm)	East Fremantle 15.15 (105)	def.	Perth 8.11 (59)	Fremantle Oval
	Bye; West Perth
George Moloney, with eight goals, stamps himself as a future star as Claremont-Cottesloe take three days to double their League win tally of their initial two seasons.

=== Round 8 ===
	Round 8
Saturday, 9 June (2:45 pm)	Claremont-Cottesloe 6.18 (54)	def. by	East Perth 10.9 (69)	Claremont Oval
Saturday, 9 June (2:45 pm)	Subiaco 9.9 (63)	def. by	East Fremantle 14.7 (91)	Subiaco Oval
Saturday, 9 June (2:45 pm)	Perth 10.13 (73)	def.	West Perth 9.11 (65)	WACA
	Bye; South Fremantle
A brilliant third quarter where they kicked 7.3 (45) to a behind allowed East Fremantle to weaken Subiaco's position at the top.

=== Round 9 ===
	Round 9
Saturday, 16 June (2:45 pm)	East Fremantle 14.22 (106)	def.	Claremont-Cottesloe 12.3 (75)	Fremantle Oval
Saturday, 16 June (2:45 pm)	West Perth 9.14 (68)	def.	Subiaco 8.9 (57)	Leederville Oval
Saturday, 16 June (2:45 pm)	Perth 23.14 (152)	def.	South Fremantle 9.13 (67)	WACA
	Bye; East Perth
Perth kick the highest WAFL score since 1917 and their highest since 1904 to crush an injury-ravaged South Fremantle.; West Perth move off the bottom by knocking early pacesetters Subiaco from top place.

=== Round 10 ===
	Round 10
Saturday, 23 June (2:45 pm)	West Perth 16.8 (104)	def.	East Perth 12.8 (80)	Leederville Oval
Saturday, 23 June (2:45 pm)	Claremont-Cottesloe 16.15 (111)	def.	Perth 13.14 (92)	Claremont Oval
Saturday, 23 June (2:45 pm)	South Fremantle 7.12 (54)	def. by	East Fremantle 13.18 (96)	Fremantle Oval
	Bye; Subiaco
After kicking only two goals from quarter-time, East Fremantle kick seven goals in the final ten minutes to go from 6.12 (48) apiece to a seven-goal win.; Frank Hopkins, formerly a defender, kicks eight goals for the Cardinals as East Perth lose their first match after Matson's death.

=== Round 11 ===
	Round 11
Saturday, 30 June (2:45 pm)	East Fremantle 6.10 (46)	def. by	West Perth 7.16 (58)	Fremantle Oval
Saturday, 30 June (2:45 pm)	East Perth 13.12 (90)	def.	South Fremantle 11.7 (73)	Perth Oval
Saturday, 30 June (2:45 pm)	Subiaco 9.13 (67)	def.	Claremont-Cottesloe 9.12 (66)	Subiaco Oval
	Bye; Perth
With the start of an exceptionally wet period that sees Perth record 613.5 millimetres (24.15 in) in two months, West Perth adapt better and despite being two games out are considered a strong chance for the final four.

=== Round 12 ===
	Round 12
Saturday, 7 July (2:45 pm)	East Fremantle 7.10 (52)	def. by	East Perth 9.14 (68)	Fremantle Oval
Saturday, 7 July (2:45 pm)	Perth 3.8 (26)	def. by	Subiaco 11.12 (78)	WACA
Saturday, 7 July (2:45 pm)	West Perth 6.9 (45)	def. by	South Fremantle 9.10 (64)	Leederville Oval
	Bye; Claremont-Cottesloe
Subiaco take the lead with a superb display of ball-handling in blinding rain. Donoghue of Perth escapes serious injury despite being accidentally kicked in the head.; East Perth record their third win over Old Easts for the season in an excellent match with fine wet-weather skills.

=== Round 13 ===
	Round 13
Saturday, 14 July (2:45 pm)	Perth 7.6 (48)	def.	East Fremantle 3.13 (31)	WACA
Saturday, 14 July (2:45 pm)	East Perth 13.7 (85)	def.	Subiaco 9.12 (66)	Perth Oval
Saturday, 14 July (2:45 pm)	South Fremantle 12.4 (76)	def.	Claremont-Cottesloe 9.19 (73)	Fremantle Oval
	Bye; West Perth
South Fremantle's win with twelve fewer scoring shots established a WAFL record unbroken until 2008 when Peel beat East Fremantle with fourteen fewer shots.

=== Round 14 ===
	Round 14
Saturday, 21 July (2:45 pm)	Subiaco 7.10 (52)	def. by	South Fremantle 8.10 (58)	Subiaco Oval
Saturday, 21 July (2:45 pm)	East Perth 4.9 (33)	drew with	Perth 4.9 (33)	Perth Oval
Saturday, 21 July (2:45 pm)	Claremont-Cottesloe 9.13 (67)	def.	West Perth 8.9 (57)	Claremont Oval
	Bye; East Fremantle
An error by scoreboard attendants leaves Claremont-Cottesloe credited with one fewer goal than they actually kicked, but fortunately does not affect the result.; East Fremantle play their first tour match against Northern Tasmania, winning 14.13 (97) to 9.4 (58) after the home team kicked only 1.0 (6) to half-time.

=== Round 15 ===
	Round 15
Saturday, 28 July (2:45 pm)	West Perth 6.13 (49)	def.	Perth 7.5 (47)	Leederville Oval
Saturday, 28 July (2:45 pm)	Subiaco 11.9 (75)	def. by	Claremont-Cottesloe 19.13 (127)	Subiaco Oval
Saturday, 28 July (2:45 pm)	South Fremantle 8.12 (60)	def.	East Perth 8.7 (55)	Fremantle Oval
	Bye; East Fremantle
Despite Bert Nissen's eight goals, Claremont-Cottesloe produce the best display and highest score of their short WAFL career, the result leaving East Perth one and a half games clear on top.; East Fremantle lose 7.13 (55) to 8.14 (62) against a southern Tasmania team at Hobart.

=== Round 16 ===
	Round 16
Saturday, 21 April (2:45 pm)	East Perth 10.11 (71)	def.	East Fremantle 8.14 (62)	Perth Oval
Saturday, 4 August (2:45 pm)	Claremont-Cottesloe 5.5 (35)	def. by	West Perth 11.13 (79)	Claremont Oval
Saturday, 4 August (2:45 pm)	Perth 4.9 (33)	def. by	Subiaco 6.6 (42)	WACA
	Bye; South Fremantle
The East Perth v East Fremantle game was played before the start of the season to allow East Fremantle to tour Tasmania.; Perth's fade-out on a ground covered in water on one wing deprives them of a chance to enter the four.

=== Round 17 ===
	Round 17
Saturday, 11 August (2:45 pm)	Claremont-Cottesloe 9.10 (64)	def. by	East Fremantle 17.19 (121)	Claremont Oval
Saturday, 11 August (2:45 pm)	East Perth 8.5 (53)	def. by	West Perth 13.15 (93)	Perth Oval
Saturday, 11 August (2:45 pm)	South Fremantle 14.11 (95)	def.	Perth 10.12 (72)	Fremantle Oval
	Bye; Subiaco

=== Round 18 ===
	Round 18
Saturday, 18 August (2:45 pm)	Subiaco 8.14 (62)	def.	East Perth 7.15 (57)	Subiaco Oval
Saturday, 18 August (2:45 pm)	Perth 4.8 (32)	def. by	East Fremantle 8.10 (58)	WACA
Saturday, 18 August (2:45 pm)	South Fremantle 12.15 (87)	def.	Claremont-Cottesloe 10.11 (71)	Fremantle Oval
Umpire Trotter was attacked as he went to the dressing room after the Subiaco versus East Perth game, which left three teams clear on top.; Sol Lawn moves to equal first on the goalkicking with his seven goals against Claremont-Cottesloe.; Johnston kicks all of Perth's goals against East Fremantle, a feat unrepeated since in the WAFL for four or more goals.

=== Round 19 ===
	Round 19
Saturday, 25 August (2:45 pm)	West Perth 13.9 (87)	def.	Subiaco 12.10 (82)	Leederville Oval
Saturday, 25 August (2:45 pm)	East Fremantle 11.18 (84)	def. by	South Fremantle 13.9 (87)	Fremantle Oval
Saturday, 25 August (2:45 pm)	Perth 12.13 (85)	def.	Claremont-Cottesloe 11.10 (76)	WACA
	Bye; West Perth
South Fremantle move to the top in a thrilling local derby despite kicking only 1.4 (10) in the second half, but their second half fadeout proved ominous for the finals.

=== Round 20 ===
	Round 20
Saturday, 1 September (2:45 pm)	East Fremantle 11.15 (81)	def.	Subiaco 8.10 (58)	Fremantle Oval
Saturday, 1 September (2:45 pm)	East Perth 23.25 (163)	def.	Perth 5.8 (38)	Perth Oval
Saturday, 1 September (2:45 pm)	West Perth 9.17 (71)	def.	South Fremantle 8.9 (57)	Leederville Oval
	Bye; Claremont-Cottesloe
East Perth, with veteran Campbell kicking thirteen goals, kick the highest WAFL score and greatest winning margin since 1917 (though at the time records were kept only from 1920).; West Perth with Ted Flemming brilliant at centre half-back win a fifth successive match, but must defeat an in-form East Fremantle to make the finals.

=== Round 21 ===
	Round 21
Saturday, 8 September (2:45 pm)	Claremont-Cottesloe 4.14 (38)	def. by	East Perth 8.11 (59)	Claremont Oval
Saturday, 8 September (2:45 pm)	Subiaco 8.16 (64)	def.	South Fremantle 7.10 (52)	Subiaco Oval
Saturday, 8 September (2:45 pm)	East Fremantle 16.15 (111)	def.	West Perth 3.5 (23)	Fremantle Oval
	Bye; Perth
West Perth, appearing exhausted after striving for the four during the past five rounds, produce a feeble display, scoring only 1.3 (9) after the first ten minutes.

== Ladder ==
1928 WAFL Ladder
Pos	Team	Pld	W	L	D	PF	PA	PP	Pts
1	East Fremantle (P)	18	11	7	0	1415	1087	130.2	44
2	East Perth	18	10	7	1	1307	1130	115.7	42
3	Subiaco	18	10	8	0	1286	1239	103.8	40
4	South Fremantle	18	10	8	0	1263	1376	91.8	40
5	West Perth	18	9	9	0	1171	1256	93.2	36
6	Perth	18	7	10	1	1215	1364	89.1	30
7	Claremont-Cottesloe	18	5	13	0	1311	1516	86.5	20

Rules for classification: 1) points; 2) percentage; 3) number of points for.
(P) Premiers

== Finals ==
=== First semi-final ===
	First semi-final
Saturday, 15 September (2:45 pm)	East Perth 20.18 (138)	def.	South Fremantle 8.2 (50)	Subiaco Oval (crowd: 11,496)
In an exceedingly vicious game in wet weather, East Perth produce a brilliant display to kick 19.18 (132) in the last three quarters. Campbell kicks eight goals and Owens five for the Royals.

=== Second semi-final ===
	Second semi-final
Saturday, 22 September (2:45 pm)	East Fremantle 9.12 (66)	def.	Subiaco 8.8 (56)	Subiaco Oval (crowd: 13,789)
In complete contrast to the previous week, this is a clean game where East Fremantle are always well ahead and a late Maroon rally does not threaten them.

=== Final ===
	Final
Saturday, 29 September (2:45 pm)	East Fremantle 7.12 (54)	def. by	East Perth 8.12 (60)	Subiaco Oval (crowd: 15,991)
East Perth record their fourth win over Old Easts after Bee runs on after taking a mark and the bell rings.

=== Grand Final ===
1928 WAFL Grand Final
Saturday, 6 October	East Fremantle	def.	East Perth	Subiaco Oval (crowd: 15,599)
2.4 (16); 7.5 (47); 10.10 (70); 10.13 (73)	Q1; Q2; Q3; Final	1.1 (7); 4.4 (28); 4.4 (28); 8.8 (56)	Umpires: Frank O‘Connor
Lethridge 5, Woods 3, Reynolds, Coffey	Goals	Thomas 2, Campbell 2, Western 2, Owens, Armstrong
Coffey, Woods, Laffin, Lethridge, Telfer, Gabrielson, Pearce	Best	Duffy (best on ground), Mitchell, Owens, Guhl, Fletcher, Glew
East Fremantle begin a sequence of four premierships with a brilliant second quarter into a strong breeze.
