= Bill Kelly (footballer, born 1882) =

Australian rules footballer

Personal information
- Full name: William George Kelly
- Born: 23 November 1882; Fitzroy, Victoria
- Died: 2 February 1961 (aged 78); Melbourne, Victoria

Playing career^{1}
Years	Club	Games (Goals)
1904	Fitzroy	7 (0)
- ^{1} Playing statistics correct to the end of 1904.

William George Kelly (23 November 1882 – 2 February 1961) was an Australian rules footballer who played for Fitzroy in the Victorian Football League (VFL). His son, Joe, played for Carlton and coached Footscray and South Melbourne.
