= Dan Scullion =

Australian rules footballer

Personal information
- Full name: Daniel Scullion
- Born: 3 June 1886; St Kilda, Victoria
- Died: 5 July 1949 (aged 63); South Melbourne, Victoria
- Original team: St Kilda Juniors
- Height: 188 cm (6 ft 2 in)

Playing career^{1}
| Years | Club | Games (Goals) |
| 1904 | St Kilda | 1 (0) |
- ^{1} Playing statistics correct to the end of 1904.

Daniel Scullion (3 June 1886 – 5 July 1949) was an Australian rules footballer who played with St Kilda in the Victorian Football League (VFL).
