= Sam Marron =

Australian rules footballer

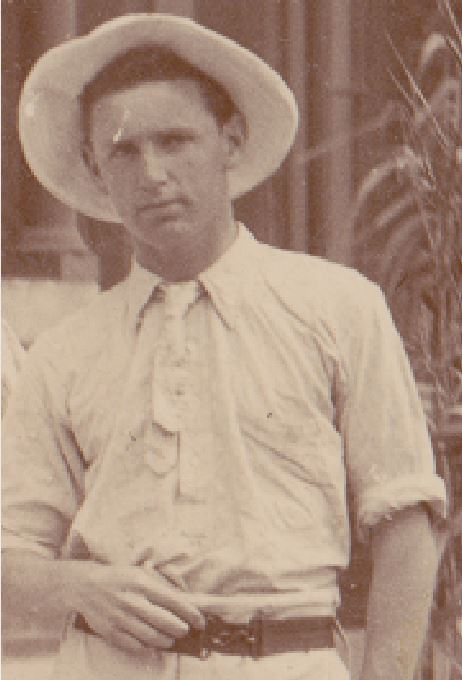

Personal information
- Full name: Samuel Hugh Marron
- Born: 7 February 1884; Geelong, Victoria
- Died: 6 May 1954 (aged 70); St Kilda East, Victoria
- Original team: Old Xavierans

Playing career^{1}
Years	Club	Games (Goals)
1904	Carlton	1 (0)
- ^{1} Playing statistics correct to the end of 1904.

Samuel Hugh Marron (7 February 1884 – 6 May 1954) was an Australian rules footballer who played with Carlton in the Victorian Football League (VFL).
