= Ivan Astruc =

Australian rules footballer

Personal information
- Full name: Ivan Will Astruc
- Born: 28 April 1876; Mauritius
- Died: 9 April 1905 (aged 28); North Melbourne, Victoria
- Original team: Essendon District

Playing career^{1}
Years	Club	Games (Goals)
1897	Fitzroy (VFL)	6 (1)
- ^{1} Playing statistics correct to the end of 1897.

Ivan Will Astruc (28 April 1876 – 9 April 1905) was an Australian rules footballer who played with Fitzroy in the Victorian Football League (VFL).

He died following a period of illness in 1905. Astruc remains the only Mauritian to play in the VFL/AFL.
