= Lionel Smale =

Australian rules footballer

Personal information
- Full name: Basil Lionel Smale
- Born: 25 November 1878; Brighton, Victoria
- Died: 22 April 1934 (aged 55); Perth, Western Australia
- Original team: Caulfield

Playing career^{1}
Years	Club	Games (Goals)
1904	Melbourne	2 (0)
- ^{1} Playing statistics correct to the end of 1904.

Basil Lionel Smale (25 November 1878 – 22 April 1934) was an Australian rules footballer who played with Melbourne in the Victorian Football League (VFL).

He died in Perth Hospital after being knocked off his bicycle by a motorist.
