= Rupe Bradley =

Australian rules footballer

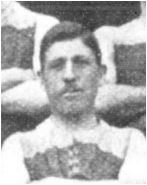
- Bradley in 1904

Personal information
- Full name: Rupert Ronald Bradley
- Born: 1 October 1881; Coburg, Victoria
- Died: 25 September 1976 (aged 94); Miles, Queensland
- Original team: Fitzroy Juniors

Playing career^{1}
Years	Club	Games (Goals)
1904–1905	Carlton	4 (4)
1906	Fitzroy	2 (1)
Total		6 (5)
- ^{1} Playing statistics correct to the end of 1906.

Rupert Ronald Bradley (1 October 1881 – 25 September 1976) was an Australian rules footballer who played with Carlton and Fitzroy in the Victorian Football League (VFL). His brother Syd Bradley played for St Kilda.
