= George Robinson (Australian cricketer) =

Australian doctor and cricketer

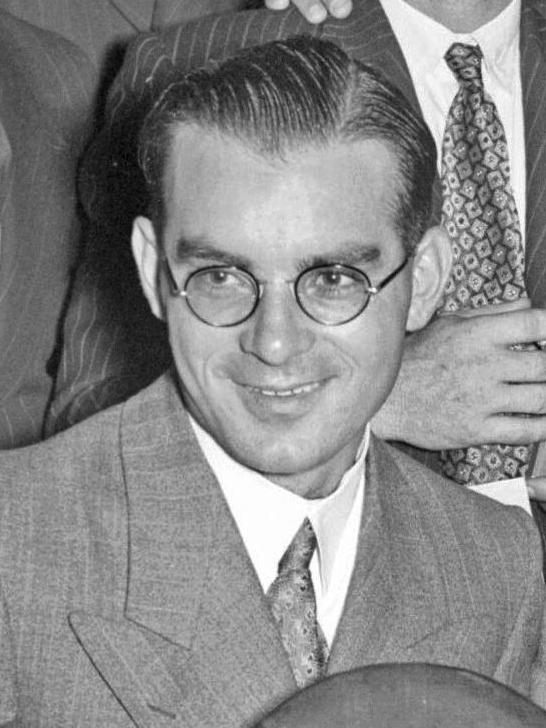
- Robinson in 1948

Personal information
- Full name: George David Robinson
- Born: 21 January 1921; Boulder, Western Australia
- Died: 12 March 1999 (aged 78); Kew, Victoria
- Batting: Right-handed
- Relatives: Alex Robinson (father); Alexander Robinson (brother); Ray Robinson (cousin)

Domestic team information
- Years: Team
- 1945/46–1947/48: Western Australia

Career statistics
Competition	First-class
Matches	8
Runs scored	472
Batting average	36.30
100s/50s	1/2
Top score	134
Catches/stumpings	2/–
- Source: Cricinfo, 22 March 2017

George David Robinson (21 January 1921 – 12 March 1999) was an Australian doctor and first-class cricketer who played for Western Australia between 1945 and 1948.

== Life and career ==
Robinson was born in Boulder, Western Australia. His father Alexander had played one match of first-class cricket for Western Australia in 1907–08, and George's younger brother, also born in Boulder, and also named Alexander, played two matches for Western Australia in 1952–53. George Robinson graduated in medicine from the University of Melbourne in 1944, and returned to Western Australia to practise.

A batsman who usually batted at number three, Robinson played several matches for Western Australia in 1945–46 and 1946–47. He was the vice-captain of Western Australia's inaugural Sheffield Shield team in 1947–48. In the first match of the season he scored 90, adding 159 for the second wicket with the captain, Keith Carmody, in an innings victory over South Australia. In the next match, against Victoria, he scored 134, this time adding 190 for the second wicket with Allan Edwards, and 126 for the third wicket with David Watt. Western Australia won the match on the first innings. Western Australia won the Shield in their inaugural season, Robinson contributing 326 runs at an average of 46.57, second only to the skipper Carmody in the team's averages and aggregates.

He maintained his medical practice while playing cricket, taking morning and evening surgery on match days. He played no further first-class cricket after the 1947–48 season, and later returned to Melbourne, where he was director of anaesthesia at Western General Hospital in Footscray for 25 years.

The cricket writer Ray Robinson was his cousin.
