= Dick Campbell (Australian footballer) =

Australian rules footballer

Personal information
- Full name: Richard Thomas Campbell
- Born: 8 December 1884; Belfast, Ireland
- Died: 15 February 1949 (aged 64); Parkville, Victoria
- Original team: Fortrose

Playing career^{1}
Years	Club	Games (Goals)
1909	St Kilda	1 (0)
- ^{1} Playing statistics correct to the end of 1909.

Richard Thomas Campbell (8 December 1884 – 15 February 1949) was an Australian rules footballer who played with St Kilda in the Victorian Football League (VFL).
