= Dave McColl =

Australian rules footballer

Personal information
- Full name: David Cowan Wellington McColl
- Born: 29 January 1876; Dunedin, New Zealand
- Died: 30 September 1946 (aged 70); South Melbourne, Victoria
- Original team: Pembroke

Playing career^{1}
Years	Club	Games (Goals)
1904	South Melbourne	5 (0)
- ^{1} Playing statistics correct to the end of 1904.

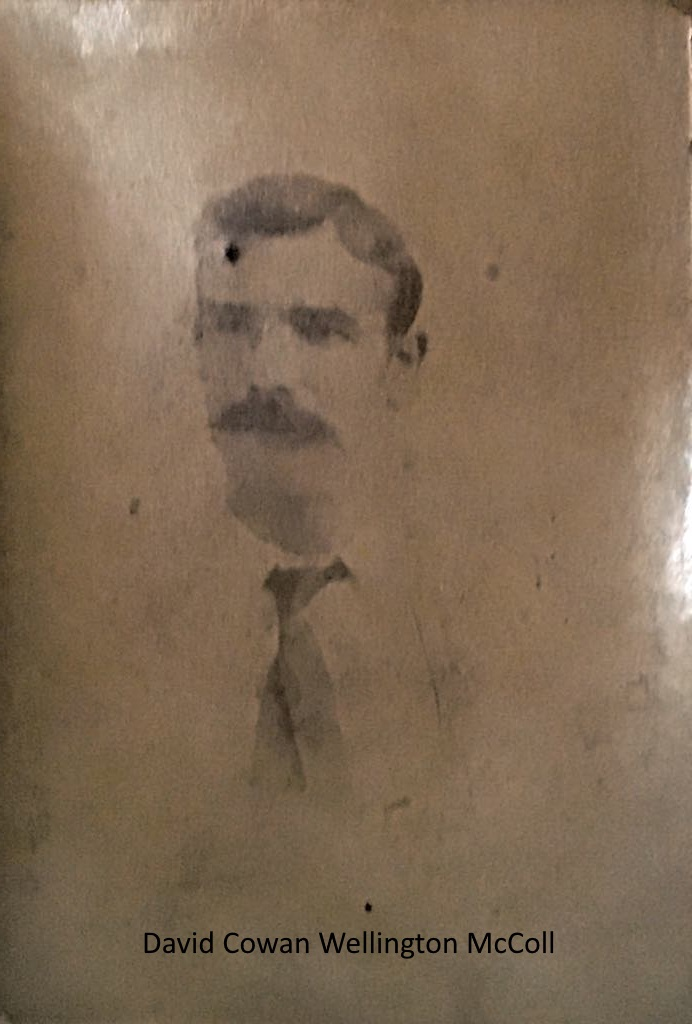

David Cowan Wellington McColl (29 January 1876 – 30 September 1946) was an Australian rules footballer who played with South Melbourne in the Victorian Football League (VFL).
