= Ernie Vollugi =

Australian rules footballer

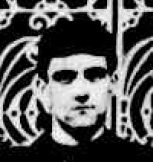

Personal information
- Full name: Ernest Robert Charles Vollugi
- Born: 6 January 1879; Carlton, Victoria
- Died: 11 May 1964 (aged 85); Dover Heights, New South Wales
- Original team: Richmond (VFA)

Playing career^{1}
Years	Club	Games (Goals)
1904	Melbourne	4 (0)
- ^{1} Playing statistics correct to the end of 1904.

Ernie Vollugi (6 January 1879 – 11 May 1964) was an Australian rules footballer who played with Richmond in the Victorian Football Association (VFA) and Melbourne in the Victorian Football League (VFL).
