= Bill Robinson (footballer, born 1880) =

Australian rules footballer

Personal information
- Full name: William Robinson
- Born: 5 August 1880; Brighton, Victoria
- Died: 2 February 1967 (aged 86); Perth, Western Australia
- Original team: Brighton Jrs / Footscray (VFA)

Playing career^{1}
Years	Club	Games (Goals)
1901–02, 1904–06	Essendon	71 (14)
- ^{1} Playing statistics correct to the end of 1906.

Career highlights
- VFL premiership player: 1901; Essendon captain: 1905

William Robinson (5 August 1880 – 2 February 1967) was an Australian rules footballer who played with Essendon in the Victorian Football League (VFL).

Robinson grew up in Brighton and played his early football for Footscray in the Victorian Football Association (VFA), from 1898 to 1900. He was one of four brothers to play in the VFL, all but one of them with him at Essendon. Having joined Essendon in 1901, Robinson missed just one game all season and was a ruckman in their premiership team. His performances during the premiership campaign saw him selected to represent the league in an interstate match against South Australia. He participated in another Grand Final a year later but ended up on the losing side.

After spending the 1903 season in the Metropolitan Association. He returned to Essendon in 1904 and was club captain in 1905, when they finished fourth. His VFL career ended in 1906 when he walked out on the club on following a dispute over Fred Hiskins.

From 1908 to 1911, Robinson played VFA football with Brighton. He then joined his brother Alex in Western Australia's Goldfields Football League.
