= Ray Robinson (cricket writer) =

Australian cricket journalist and author

Ray Robinson

Raymond John Robinson (8 July 1905 – 6 July 1982) was an Australian journalist and author, best known for his writings on cricket.

== Life and career ==
Born in the Melbourne suburb of Brighton, Robinson attended Brighton State School and joined the Melbourne Herald as a copy boy. Given a cadetship with the paper, he reported on Australian rules football and cricket from 1925.

In 1925, he wrote to Plum Warner, the editor of The Cricketer magazine, complaining about its poor coverage of Australian cricket. Warner invited him to become the periodical's Australian correspondent, and Robinson continued contributing to it until the early 1980s.

In 1930, Robinson was recruited to the editorial staff of a new daily paper, The Star as chief cricket writer. Four years later, he accompanied the Australian team on its tour of England. Subsequently, he toured England with the Australians in 1948, 1953, 1956 and 1961; and to South Africa in 1957–58 and the West Indies in 1954–55. He made a number of tours of India and Pakistan, writing for the Times of India and Sportsweek in Mumbai. After The Star closed he worked briefly in radio.

Invited to join the staff of The Daily Telegraph by Sir Frank Packer, Robinson relocated to Sydney in 1939. He published his first cricket book, Between Wickets, in 1946 after the manuscript was recommended to the William Collins publishing house by Neville Cardus.

He retired as a full-time journalist in 1970 and published The Wildest Tests two years later. Awarded a Commonwealth Literary Fund fellowship and a grant from the Literature Board of the Council for the Arts, Robinson began work on his magnum opus, a series of essays about Australia's cricket captains. Released in 1975, On Top Down Under won the English Cricket Society's literary award for 1976.

In his latter years, he suffered from poor health but he continued writing though he was legally blind. He was admitted to Sydney's Royal North Shore Hospital after a fall at home. Complications followed and he died from an intestinal blockage on 6 July 1982, two days before his 77th birthday.

On 6 October 1928 Robinson married Ellen Jessie Gilbert (d 1973), and they had two children, both born while Robinson was away on Ashes tours: Brian (b 1930) and Audrey (1934–1968).

== Appraisal ==
According to Gideon Haigh, "Robinson’s books were distinguished by meticulous accuracy and painstakingly well-turned phrases" and "he coined 'body-line' as an adjective and 'bodyline' as a noun."

Bill O'Reilly wrote, "as an author he had no equal." Don Bradman called him "one of the very finest and most respected authors on cricket that Australia has produced." Lindsay Hassett called him "not only one of the best cricket writers in the world but honest and trustworthy." "The most highly respected writer of my time," wrote Bob Simpson. "Pound for pound we reckoned he was the best cricket writer in the world," said Alan Davidson. "His books were masterpieces; the research incredible. He was not just a writer, he was a friend of cricket."

== Bibliography ==
- Between Wickets: Collins (1946).
- From the Boundary: Collins (1951).
- Green Sprigs (published in the UK as The Glad Season): Collins (1955).
- The Wit of Sir Robert Menzies: Leslie Frewin (1966).
- The Wildest Tests: Pelham (1972) ISBN 0-7207-0594-0.
- On Top Down Under: Cassell Australia (1975) ISBN 0-7269-7364-5.
