= Mick Holligan =

Australian rules footballer

Personal information
- Full name: Michael James Holligan
- Born: 16 September 1881; Geelong, Victoria
- Died: 3 February 1948 (aged 66); Beechworth, Victoria
- Original team: Barwon

Playing career^{1}
Years	Club	Games (Goals)
1904–05	Geelong	6 (3)
- ^{1} Playing statistics correct to the end of 1905.

Michael James Holligan (16 September 1881 – 3 February 1948) was an Australian rules footballer who played with Geelong in the Victorian Football League (VFL).
