= Joe Marchant (footballer) =

Australian rules footballer

Personal information
- Full name: Joe Marchant
- Born: 11 September 1884

Playing career^{1}
Years	Club	Games (Goals)
1904	St Kilda	1 (0)
- ^{1} Playing statistics correct to the end of 1904.

Joe Marchant (11 September 1884, date of death unknown) was an Australian rules footballer who played with St Kilda in the Victorian Football League (VFL).
