= Bryan Martin (footballer) =

Australian rules footballer (1918–1983)

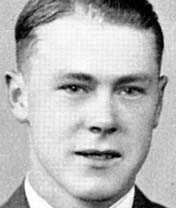

Personal information
- Full name: Bryan Russell Martin
- Born: 22 September 1918; Marylebone, London, England
- Died: 26 July 1983 (aged 64); Chadstone, Victoria
- Original team: Scotch College
- Height: 5”6
- Weight: 175

Playing career^{1}
Years	Club	Games (Goals)
1942–43	Melbourne	5 (0)
- ^{1} Playing statistics correct to the end of 1943.

Bryan Russell Martin (22 September 1918 – 26 July 1983) was an Australian rules footballer who played with Melbourne in the Victorian Football League (VFL).
