= Alexander Robinson (cricketer, born 1924) =

Australian cricketer

Alec Robinson
Personal information
- Full name: Alexander William Robinson
- Born: 14 August 1924; Boulder, Western Australia
- Died: 18 June 2012 (aged 87); Fremantle, Perth, Western Australia
- Batting: Right-handed
- Role: Batsman
- Relatives: Alex Robinson (father); George Robinson (brother); Ray Robinson (cousin)

Domestic team information
- Years: Team
- 1952/53: Western Australia
- Source: Cricinfo, 14 July 2017

Alexander William Robinson (14 August 1924 – 18 June 2012) was an Australian cricketer. He played two first-class matches for Western Australia during the 1952–53 season.

Born at Boulder, Robinson grew up in the Mount Lawley area of Perth and was educated at Wesley College in the city. He joined Mount Lawley Cricket Club where he played alongside his older brother George. Their father, Alex Robinson was also a batsman who had played for Western Australia in 1907–08 and was a notable Australian rules footballer.

During World War II, Robinson enlisted in the Australian Army before transferring to the Royal Air Force in England. He served as a radio operator in Bomber Command, flying 34 combat missions, before returning to Australia at the end of the war.

After moving to play club cricket for North Perth in 1948–49, Robinson's career "blossomed". He scored 502 runs in the First Grade competition in 1952–53 and made his only first-class appearances for the state team towards the end of the season. After making 20 and 0 against an Australian XI at the WACA ground in mid-March, he played against the touring South Africans at the end of the month, recording another duck in his first innings and scoring four runs in his second. His brother played eight first-class matches for Western Australia between 1945–46 and 1947–48. His cousin, Ray Robinson, was a noted journalist and cricket writer.

Professionally Robinson was a teacher working in the Bassendean area of Perth before later becoming an administrator at the Western Australian Department of Sport and Recreation where he developed cricket coaching programmes. He had studied in England, completing a master's degree at the Loughborough University during the 1950s, and had been trained as a coach at the MCC. He coached age-group Western Australia teams.

Married with two children, Robinson lived at East Fremantle in retirement. He died in 2012 aged 87.
