= Tom Watson (Australian footballer) =

Australian rules footballer (1874–1936)

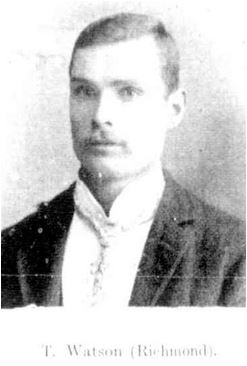
- Watson in 1899

Personal information
- Full name: Thomas Watson
- Born: 1 January 1874; Dunedin, New Zealand
- Died: 3 August 1936 (aged 62); The Alfred Hospital
- Original team: Richmond (VFA)

Playing career^{1}
Years	Club	Games (Goals)
1902	Carlton	14 (0)
1904	Melbourne	1 (0)
Total		15 (0)
- ^{1} Playing statistics correct to the end of 1904.

Thomas Watson (1 January 1874 – 3 August 1936) was an Australian rules footballer who played with Carlton and Melbourne in the Victorian Football League (VFL).
