= Fred Robinson (footballer, born 1884) =

Australian rules footballer

Personal information
- Full name: Frederick Thomas Robinson
- Born: 15 May 1884; Brighton, Victoria
- Died: 6 October 1971 (aged 87); Korumburra, Victoria
- Original team: Footscray (VFA)
- Position: Fullback

Playing career^{1}
Years	Club	Games (Goals)
1904–05	Essendon	35 (0)
- ^{1} Playing statistics correct to the end of 1905.

Frederick Thomas Robinson (15 May 1884 – 6 October 1971) was an Australian rules footballer who played with Essendon in the Victorian Football League (VFL) and Footscray and Brighton in the Victorian Football Association.

Following his stint with Essendon, Robinson played for Brighton Football Club on its entry to the VFA.
