= 1899 VFL grand final =

Grand final of the 1899 Victorian Football League season

Fitzroy	South Melbourne
3.9 (27)	3.8 (26)
	1	2	3	4
FIT	0.1 (1)	2.4 (16)	2.6 (18)	3.9 (27)
SM	2.3 (15)	2.3 (15)	3.7 (25)	3.8 (26)
- Date: 16 September 1899
- Stadium: St Kilda Cricket Ground
- Attendance: 4,823

The 1899 VFL grand final was an Australian rules football game contested between the Fitzroy Football Club and South Melbourne Football Club, held at the St Kilda Cricket Ground in Melbourne, on 16 September 1899, to determine the premiership team for the 1899 VFL season

It was the second annual grand final of the Victorian Football League. The match, attended by 4,823 spectators, was won by Fitzroy by a margin of 1 point, becoming the first club to claim back-to-back VFL premierships.

== Lead-up ==
Fitzroy had won the minor premiership in the 1899 season, while South Melbourne had finished sixth after the home-and-away season. In the sectional major rounds, Fitzroy and South Melbourne each finished with records of 3–0 to qualify for the final.

Under the finals system in place, this match was the final of the major round, played between the two section winners. Had South Melbourne won the match, it would not have immediately won the season's premiership; Fitzroy, as the minor premiers, would have had the right to challenge South to a rematch for the premiership on the following Saturday. Meanwhile, Fitzroy could clinch the premiership win a win in this match.

== Summary ==
The match was played in heavy rain:

"The last match of the season for the league premiership was played on Saturday, when Fitzroy and South Melbourne met on the St. Kilda Cricket Ground.
Unfortunately, steady rain, which had fallen all the morning, continued nearly all the afternoon, making the conditions under which the game was played unsatisfactory for the players and most unpleasant for spectators.
The "weather committee" had not met to consider the advisability of a postponement, and when the teams assembled South Melbourne suggested deferring the match until next Saturday, but Fitzroy preferred to brave the elements.
The assembling of about 4000 spectators in the unfavorable circumstances indicated clearly that, if the weather had kept fine, the attendance would have been enormous.
As it was, those present evinced keen interest in the game, every notable bit of good play being heartily cheered.
Amongst the onlookers were a number of enthusiasts from Geelong, who came up by special train.
[Patrick] McShane had the ground in splendid order until the rain came, and even after the steady downpour, extending over many hours, it played very, much better than could have been expected, reflecting great credit on the experienced and skilful curator. ...
Seldom has such a fine game of football been played under such disadvantages ..." (The Age, 18 September 1899).

The strong wind from the southern end of the ground favoured South Melbourne in the opening quarter. Harry Lampe kicked the first two goals of the match, and Fitzroy's only score, a behind, came when a kick from Mick Grace hit the post.

Fitzroy then had the advantage of the wind in the second quarter. Goals to Mick Grace and Fred Fontaine had them ahead at half time.

Charlie Colgan gave South Melbourne the lead with the only goal of the third term.

Fitzroy finished strongly. Bill McSpeerin's goal 15 minutes into the final quarter gave Fitzroy the win.

== Teams ==
Fitzroy's Bert Sharpe, the team's centre half-forward in its 1898 premiership side, was a late withdrawal from the side due to the death of his father the day before the Grand Final; his teammates wore black armbands for that match.

Fitzroy	South Melb.

Fitzroy
B:	Hugh McEwen	Geoff Moriarty	Ern Jenkins
HB:	Jack Deas	Pat Hickey	Alec Sloan (c)
C:	Eddie Drohan	Harry Clarke	Kelly Robinson
HF:	Pat Descrimes	Fred Fontaine	Bill Dalton
F:	Alf McDougall	Jim Grace	Bill Cleary
Foll:	Mick Grace	Bill Potter	Bill McSpeerin

South Melbourne
B:	Frank O'Hara	Dave Adamson (c)	Warwick Armstrong
HB:	Albert Trim	Charlie Goding	George Davidson
C:	Jim O'Hara	Bill Windley	Herb Howson
HF:	Charlie James	Harry Lampe	Henri Jeanneret
F:	Bill Fraser	Charlie Colgan	Artie Henley
Foll:	Mick Pleass	Joe Garbutt	Bob Bryce

- Umpire – Henry "Ivo" Crapp

== Scoreboard ==
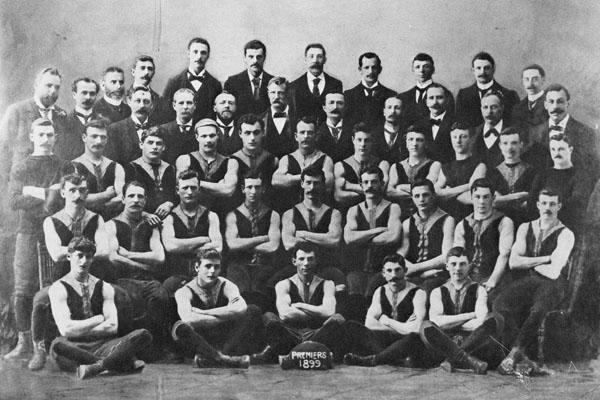
Fitzroy FC team, premiers

Grand Final
Saturday, 16 September (3:00 pm)	Fitzroy	def.	South Melbourne	Junction Oval (crowd: 4,823)
0.1 (1); 2.4 (16); 2.6 (18); 3.9 (27)	Q1; Q2; Q3; Final	2.3 (15); 2.3 (15); 3.7 (25); 3.8 (26)	Umpires: Crapp
Fontaine, M. Grace, McSpeerin 1	Goals	2 Lampe; 1 Colgan

== See also ==
- 1899 VFL season
