= Bill Proudfoot =

Australian rules footballer (1868–1931)

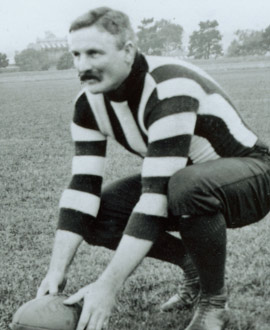
- Proudfoot during his Collingwood career

Personal information
- Full name: William Henry Proudfoot
- Born: 11 June 1868; Kilmore, Victoria
- Died: 11 January 1931 (aged 62); Richmond, Victoria
- Original team: Britannia
- Height: 184 cm (6 ft 0 in)
- Weight: 102 kg (225 lb)

Playing career^{1}
Years	Club	Games (Goals)
1892–1896	Collingwood (VFA)	79 (1)
1897–1906	Collingwood	108 (0)
Total		187 (1)
- ^{1} Playing statistics correct to the end of 1906.

Career highlights
- VFA premiership player: 1896; 2× VFL premiership player: 1902, 1903; Collingwood captain: 1901

William Henry Proudfoot (11 June 1868 – 11 January 1931) was an Australian rules footballer who played for the Collingwood Football Club in both the Victorian Football Association (VFA) and the Victorian Football League (VFL).

== Family ==
The son of James Proudfoot (1818–1902), and Isabella Proudfoot (1829–1904), née McLean, William Henry Proudfoot was born at Kilmore, Victoria on 11 June 1868.

He married Evelyn Crewther (1875–1944), in Kyneton, Victoria on 3 October 1900. They had one child, a son, Stanley Gordon Proudfoot (1901–1936).

Bill is the uncle of Collingwood player Norm Crewther, and the third great uncle of the former Federal Member for Dunkley and current State Member for Mornington, Chris Crewther MP.

== Football ==
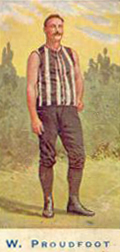
Bill Proudfoot (c.1900).

=== Collingwood (VFA) ===
A solidly built fullback, Proudfoot was a member of Collingwood's inaugural (1892) VFA side. He played in the team's first VFA match, against Carlton, at Victoria Park, on 7 May 1892 — he kicked the only goal of his extended VFA and VFL career.

He was the first-ever Collingwood player to represent Victoria, when he was selected to play against South Australia, at the MCG on 21 July 1894.

==== 25 July 1896 ====
The Collingwood vice-captain and real-life police constable Proudfoot was involved in an infamous incident during a game for Collingwood against North Melbourne on 25 July 1896 when a riot occurred at full-time, with the spectators invading the field, and North Melbourne supporters attacking both the umpire, former Carlton and VFA representative footballer Jack Roberts, and a number of the Collingwood players:

"A disgraceful scene was enacted on the North Melbourne cricket ground yesterday afternoon at the conclusion of the match between North Melbourne and Collingwood. Immediately the umpire (J. Roberts) left the field he was attacked by close on a hundred persons, who are presumed to be North Melbourne supporters, and was brutally beaten. It was with the utmost difficulty that he was got away from the infuriated mob and taken into the pavilion. The scene was a most exciting one. Free fights were numerous." — The (Hobart) Mercury, 27 July 1896.

While attempting to stop the umpire from getting injured, Proudfoot was badly beaten in the melee:

"The moment that the final bell rang there was a rush of people in the reserve to the pavilion gate, and as it was evident that some of them meant mischief, several of the Collingwood players and a few North Melbourne quickly got round the umpire, who had to run the gauntlet of this ruffianism to reach the dressing-room. It was well that they did so or Roberts would either have been killed or seriously injured, for the moment he stepped through the gate scores of men rushed at him like wolves, and a scene of indescribable tumult followed. Fists and sticks were going, and one man in the thick of the crowd with some implement wrapped in paper was making desperate efforts to fracture someone's skull. In the first rush Roberts was seized by the hair and dragged down, and but for the splendid help given him just then, notably by Proudfoot, of Collingwood, who, holding one arm over his head to shield himself against a rain of blows and with the other round the umpire, literally carried him through the pack with one of his football rushes. [The Collingwood captain] Strickland, who at one time got separated from his men, had to fight hard for his own safety, and many of the Collingwood men were mauled before they reached the pavilion. M'Dougall, one of the North Melbourne players, was apparently the worst sufferer by the melee, as he received a very nasty blow on the head which left him almost insensible." — The Australian Star, 1 August 1896.

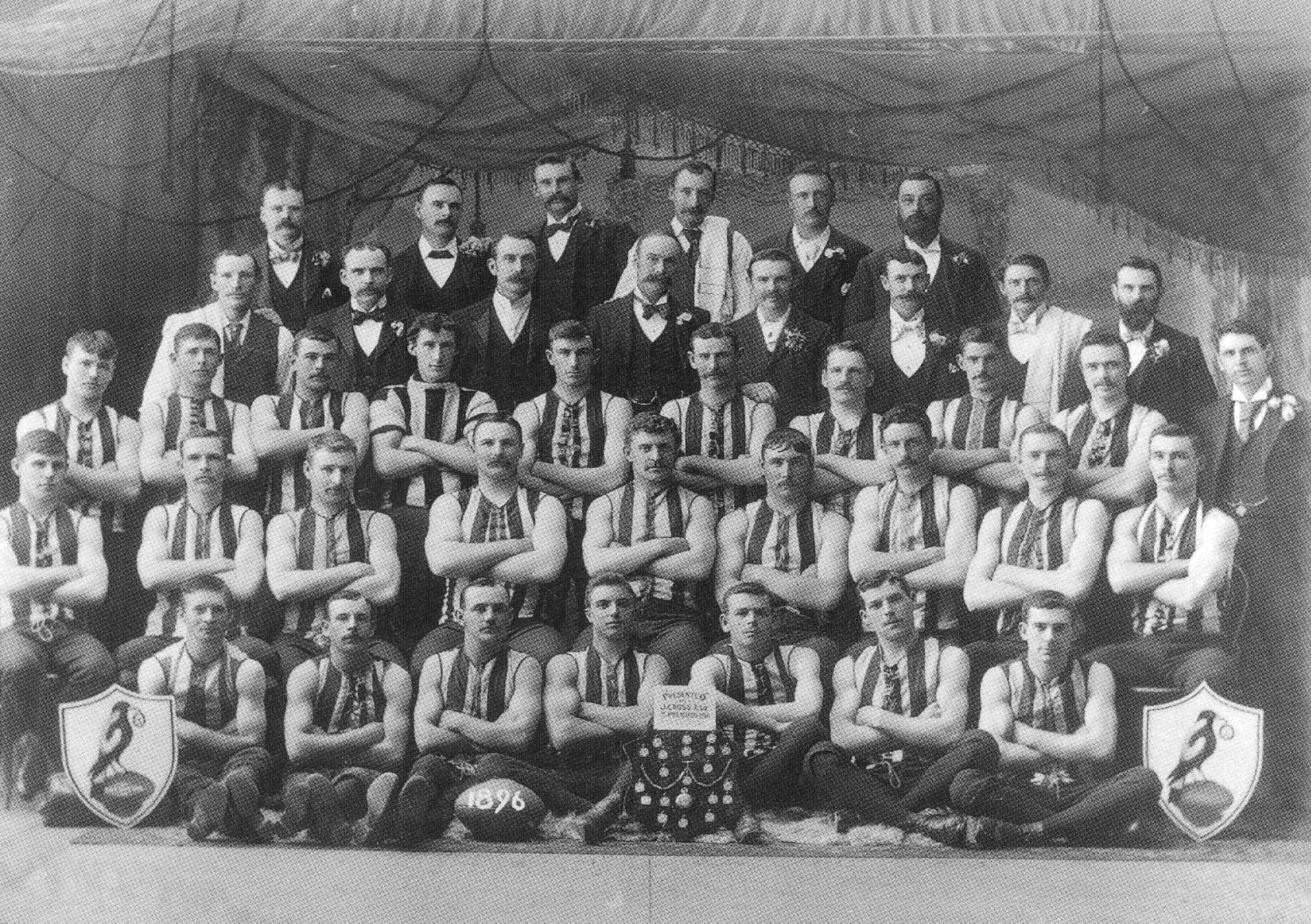
The 1896 VFA premiership team; Proudfoot is seated, fourth from left.

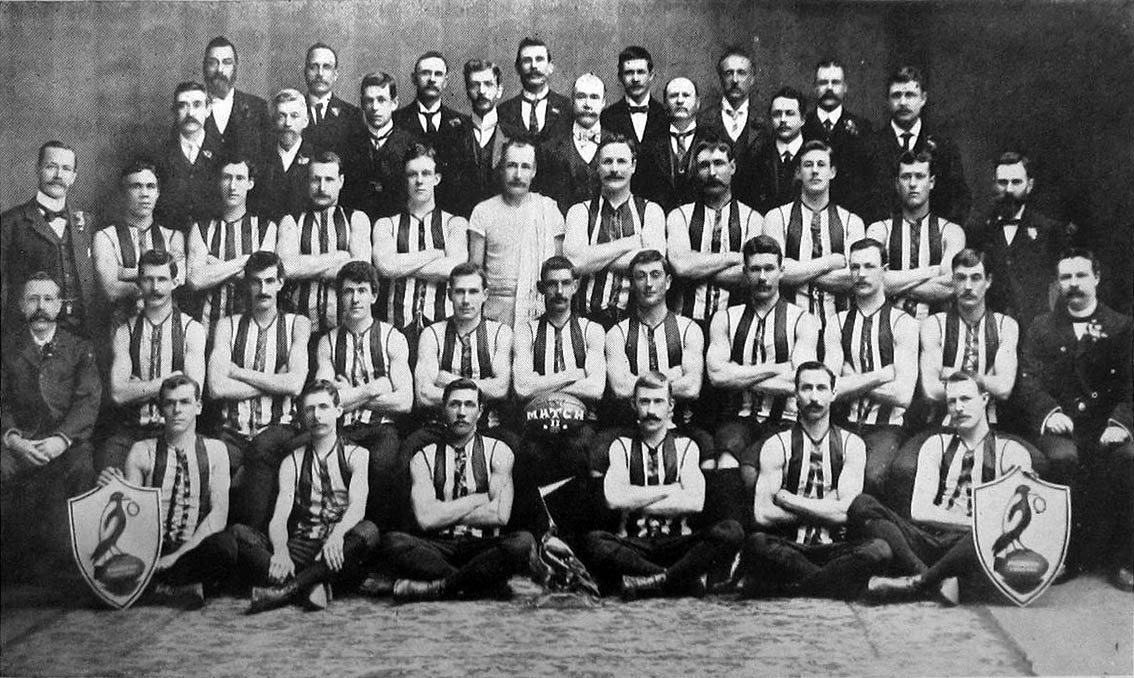
The 1902 VFL premiership team; Proudfoot is standing, fourth from right.

"Long before the teams reached the pavilion gate it could be seen that there was to be trouble, and as the crowd began to yell, the Collingwood players, headed by Proudfoot, and some of tho North Melbourne team closed round the umpire, at whom it was evident the wild screams were directed. But for this precaution the umpire, Roberts, would probably have been killed. The yelling mob, male and female, had apparently gone mad, and the brutality exhibited was only equalled by the cowardly tricks resorted to in order to get a hit or kick at the umpire on the sly. Roberts was hit and kicked, and eventually reached the pavilion in a state of utter exhaustion. M'Dougall, one of the local team, was knocked on the head while endeavoring to keep the crowd off, and Proudfoot, who most gallantly constituted himself Robert's chief bodyguard, was so brutally maltreated that on reaching the pavilion he completely collapsed. Proudfoot proved himself a hero, and as he bravely encircled the little umpire with one arm, and strove to protect him from a perfect hailstorm of blows from fists and sticks with the other, none but the cowards who were attacking him could have failed to admire his generous courage. The incident afforded gratifying proof that there are still amongst footballers men who are a credit to the game, and if the crowd at Victoria Park this afternoon [i.e., 1 August] fail to show its appreciation of Proudfoot's bravery when he comes out to battle against Geelong, I am a bad judge of human nature." — "Follower", The Leader, 1 August 1896.

In the process of the official VFA investigation into the assault on Roberts (conducted on 6 April 1896) goal-umpire Wallace gave evidence that a "North Melbourne barracker" had "threatened to put a knife into him".

On 6 August 1896, one Samuel Fenton, "a powerfully-built man", was charged with assaulting Proudfoot, was found guilty, and was sentenced to 3 months imprisonment.

Samuel Fenton, an old man, who many years ago was transported to Western Australia, and received many sentences there as well as in Victoria since his arrival twelve years ago, was before the City Court to-day charged with assaulting Wm. Henry Proudfoot, a footballer, at North Melbourne, on the 25th ult. He admitted striking Proudfoot with an umbrella but explained that he did so by mistake, having intended the blow for a man who was using an iron bar on other people. He was ordered to be "imprisoned for three months without the option of a fine and to pay £4 costs." — The (Melbourne) Herald, 7 August 1896.

==== 3 October 1896 ====
Proudfoot was full-back for the Collingwood team that defeated South Melbourne in the 1896 VFA premiership match, Collingwood's last match in the VFA.

=== Collingwood (VFL) ===
Following the formation of the Victorian Football League in 1897, Proudfoot played for Collingwood, against St. Kilda, at Victoria Park, on 8 May 1897, in the team's first-ever match of the VFL's first season.

==== 1899 season ====
At the end of the 1899 season, in the process of naming his own "champion player", Reginald Wilmot the football correspondent for The Argus (writing as "Old Boy"), selected a team of the best players of the 1899 VFL competition:

Backs: Maurie Collins (Essendon), Bill Proudfoot (Collingwood), Peter Burns (Geelong);
Halfbacks: Pat Hickey (Fitzroy), George Davidson (South Melbourne), Alf Wood (Melbourne);
Centres: Fred Leach (Collingwood), Firth McCallum (Geelong), Harry Wright (Essendon);
Wings: Charlie Pannam (Collingwood), Eddie Drohan (Fitzroy), Herb Howson (South Melbourne);
Forwards: Bill Jackson (Essendon), Eddy James (Geelong), Charlie Colgan (South Melbourne);
Ruck: Mick Pleass (South Melbourne), Frank Hailwood (Collingwood), Joe McShane (Geelong);
Rovers: Dick Condon (Collingwood), Bill McSpeerin (Fitzroy), Teddy Rankin (Geelong).

From those he considered to be the three best players — that is, Condon, Hickey, and Pleass — Wilmot selected Pat Hickey as his "champion player" of the season.

Proudfoot was Collingwood captain in 1898 and also had the role for the latter half of 1899 and in 1901. Proudfoot played in Collingwood's first two VFL premiership winning sides; in 1902 and 1903.

==== 30 June 1900 ====
Proudfoot played at full-back in the match against Geelong, at Victoria Park on 30 June 1900 under the assumed name of McKenna. The newspaper match reports go along with the deception, and speak only of McKenna; with "Markwell's" report in The Australasian noting that "McKenna" (in inverted commas) was one of Collingwood's best players. In its match report, The Sportsman of Melbourne noted that Collingwood's McKenna was "a new back from Castlemaine". In speaking of Collingwood's best players on the day, Reginald Wilmot (i.e., "Old Boy" of The Age) noted that, "McKenna (who is said to be every bit as good a man as Proudfoot) ... did excellent work"; and a Collingwood-region newspaper noted the same relationship:

"Proudfoot will never be missed as long as "McKenna" takes his place; there being a great similarity in their play." — The Mercury and Weekly Courier, 6 July 1900.

==== 1903 ====
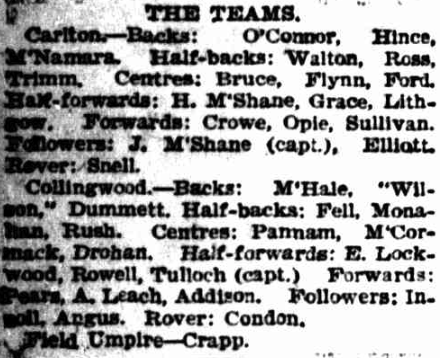
1903 VFL Semi-Final teams; with "Wilson" as Collingwood's full-back.

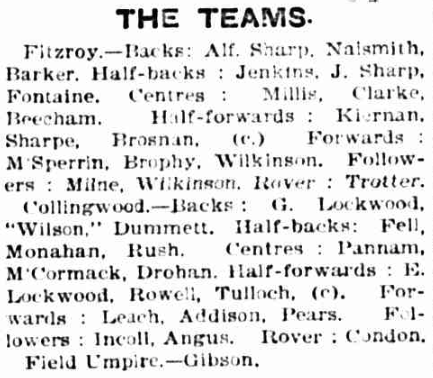
1903 VFL Grand Final teams; with "Wilson" as Collingwood's full-back.

In February 1903, Thomas O'Callaghan the Fifth Victorian Chief Commissioner of Police issued the following notification in the Victorian Police Gazette:

"Police Discipline.— It is officially notified that members of the police force taking part in any athletic contest, or any bicycle, horse, or foot race, or in any public stage performance without the consent of the Chief Commissioner commit an offence against the discipline of the service."

As a consequence of the commissioner's ban, he played in the 1903 Semi Final and Grand Final under the assumed name of "Bill Wilson".

== Policeman ==
Proudfoot served as a member of the Victorian Police Force from 1888 till 1926, when he retired with the rank of Superintendent, and was in charge of the Ballarat police district.

=== 6 June 1908 ===
On 6 June 1908, Proudfoot was on police duty at the Brunswick Street Oval at the match between Fitzroy and Essendon. Fitzroy was beaten by four points, 5.12 (42) to 5.8 (38), in a torrid match from which four players were reported: Essendon ruckman Allan Belcher for striking Fitzroy's Norm McLennan; Essendon's Jim Martin for "general rough play"; Fitzroy's Bob Smith for "disputing umpires decisions"; and Fitzroy ruckman Bill Walker for striking Essendon's Mike Londerigan. The VFl tribunal met on 10 June 1908, and found all four players guilty, suspending Belcher, Martin, and Walker for four matches each, and "reprimanding" Smith.

The Fitzroy supporters, very upset at both the umpiring of Lardie Tulloch (a former Collingwood team-mate of Proudfoot) and the injury to George Holden (who had to be carried off the ground in the first quarter) — attempted to mob the Essendon players as they returned to the Essendon rooms at the end of the match. Field umpire Tulloch had already been assaulted twice in the 1908 season by angry VFL spectators after a match: the Geelong v. Melbourne match, at the Corio Oval on 16 May 1908, and the St Kilda v. Carlton match, at the Junction Oval on 27 June 1908.

The Essendon ruckman, Allan Belcher, was particular target of the mob's attention; and it was only because of the specific protection of Proudfoot that Belcher was able to reach the Essendon rooms unscathed. The Essendon team, under a police guard, was eventually able to escape the mob, via the tennis court on the Clifton Hill side of the ground, and reach their waiting transport.

=== 23 December 1918 ===
On 23 December 1918, a pair of cart-horses bolted in Swanston-street. Proudfoot (then aged 51) caught the horses and, after some struggle with the horses (which had turned into Bourke-street), he was able to prevent the horses from colliding with a tram car fully loaded with passengers. He was awarded a Bronze Medal in 1919 from the Royal Humane Society of Australasia for his bravery.

== Hotelier ==
Upon his retirement from the police force, he took over ownership of the Werribee Club Hotel, also known as "Wall's Hotel" in Werribee.

== Death ==
Proudfoot died, after a period of illness, at a private hospital, in Richmond, Victoria on 11 January 1931. He was buried at the Fawkner Cemetery.

== See also ==
- The Footballers' Alphabet
