= Peter Burns (footballer, born 1866) =

Australian rules footballer (1866–1952)

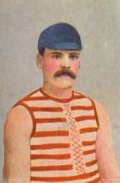

Personal information
- Full name: Peter Charles Burns
- Born: 5 January 1866; Steiglitz, Victoria
- Died: 11 October 1952 (aged 86); Williamstown, Victoria

Playing career^{1}
Years	Club	Games (Goals)
1885	Ballarat Imperials (VFA)	2 (0)
1885–1891	South Melbourne (VFA)	126 (100)
1892–1896	Geelong (VFA)	88 (27)
1897–1902	Geelong	89 (7)
Total		305 (134)

Representative team honours
Years	Team	Games (Goals)
	Victoria	14
- ^{1} Playing statistics correct to the end of 1902.

Career highlights
- South Melbourne (VFA) premiership player 1885, 1888–1890; Geelong captain 1896 (VFA), 1900; Victorian captain 1899

Peter Charles Burns (5 January 1866 – 11 October 1952) was an Australian rules footballer in the (then) Victorian Football Association (VFA) and Victorian Football League (VFL).

== Family ==
The son of John Burns (1829–1897), and Martha Burns (1833–1914), née Harrison, Peter Charles Burns was born at Steiglitz, Victoria, on 5 January 1866. One of his brothers, Allen Burns, played for South Melbourne in the VFL.

Peter Burns married Elizabeth Corbett (1867–1951) in South Melbourne on 18 April 1889.

== Football ==
Burns was a tall ruckman and full-back who made his debut in 1881, aged 16 years, with Ballarat Imperials before transferring to powerful VFA club South Melbourne in 1885.

=== South Melbourne (VFA) ===
Burns played 126 games for South and played in four premierships before joining Geelong in 1892.

=== Geelong (VFA and VFL) ===
In his last VFA game, in Round 20 of 1896, Burns played his 216th career game to break the Victorian elite football games record held by former South Melbourne teammate and captain Henry "Sonny" Elms.

Following the Victorian Football League's formation in 1897, Burns would play a further 89 games before his retirement during the 1902 season, which was due to a leg injury he sustained while playing for Victoria against South Australia on 26 June 1902 rather than any loss of form.

Burns served as Geelong's timekeeper from his retirement in 1902 until the end of the 1941 VFL season (the sixtieth year of his association with Australian rules football). Geelong did not compete in the VFL competition in 1942 and 1943, due to war-time travel restrictions.

=== 1899 team of "champions" ===
At the end of the 1899 season, in the process of naming his own "champion player", the football correspondent for The Argus, Reginald Wilmot ("Old Boy"), selected a team of the best players of the 1899 VFL competition:

- Backs: Maurie Collins (Essendon), Bill Proudfoot (Collingwood), Peter Burns (Geelong).
- Halfbacks: Pat Hickey (Fitzroy), George Davidson (South Melbourne), Alf Wood (Melbourne).
- Centres: Fred Leach (Collingwood), Firth McCallum (Geelong), Harry Wright (Essendon).
- Wings: Charlie Pannam (Collingwood), Eddie Drohan (Fitzroy), Herb Howson (South Melbourne).
- Forwards: Bill Jackson (Essendon), Eddy James (Geelong), Charlie Colgan (South Melbourne).
- Ruck: Mick Pleass (South Melbourne), Frank Hailwood (Collingwood), Joe McShane (Geelong).
- Rovers: Dick Condon (Collingwood), Bill McSpeerin (Fitzroy), Teddy Rankin (Geelong).

From those he considered to be the three best players — that is, Condon, Hickey, and Pleass — Wilmot selected Pat Hickey as his "champion player" of the season.

== 305 VFA/VFL games ==
Burns was the first player in elite Australian rules football to play 250 games, achieving this feat in Round 17 of the 1898 VFL season, and subsequently the first to play 300 games, achieving this feat in Round 2 of 1902.

His career total of 305 games remained a Victorian elite football record until it was broken by Gordon Coventry in the 1937 Grand Final, which was also Coventry's last game, with Burns in attendance as Geelong's timekeeper, a position he held at Geelong from 1902.

=== Other matches ===
Burns also played 14 intercolonial/interstate football matches for Victoria. If these are included, Burns was also the first player to play 300 career senior games, a feat he achieved in Round 6 of 1901, and his total of 319 career senior games was an elite Victorian elite football record until it was broken by Gordon Coventry in Round 10 of 1937; Coventry retired at the end of that season with 331 career senior games.

== Death ==
Burns died at his residence in Williamstown, Victoria, on 11 October 1952.

== Honours ==
In 1996, Burns was inducted into the Australian Football Hall of Fame.
