= Dick Condon =

Australian rules footballer and coach (1876–1946)

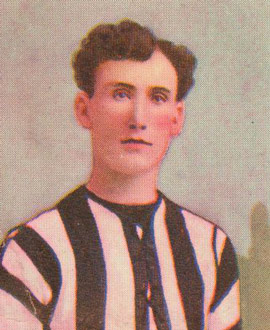

Personal information
- Full name: Richard Patrick Condon
- Born: 19 March 1876; Carlton, Victoria
- Died: 27 December 1946 (aged 70); Sydney, New South Wales
- Original team: Collingwood Juniors
- Height: 180 cm (5 ft 11 in)
- Weight: 72 kg (159 lb)

Playing career^{1}
Years	Club	Games (Goals)
1894–1896	Collingwood (VFA)	45 (14)
1897–1900; 1902–1906	Collingwood	149 (101)
1908–1909	Richmond	32 (26)
Total		226 (141)

Coaching career
Years	Club	Games (W–L–D)
1905–1906	Collingwood	37 (26–11–0)
1908–1909	Richmond	36 (12–24–0)
Total		73 (38–35–0)
- ^{1} Playing statistics correct to the end of 1909.

Career highlights
- VFA premiership player: 1896; 2× VFL premiership player: 1902, 1903; Collingwood captain: 1899–1900; Richmond captain: 1908–1909

Richard Patrick Condon (19 March 1876 – 27 December 1946) was an Australian rules footballer who played for Collingwood and Richmond in the Victorian Football Association (VFA) and the Victorian Football League (VFL) across two decades in the 1890s and 1900s.

== Talent ==
Standing at 180 cm (5 ft 11 in), Condon played primarily as a follower. Contemporary sources cited his speed, evasiveness and ability to read the game.

Condon is widely credited as the man who contributed the most to the development of the stab kick, which—once the specially designed "blunter" Sherrin Match II football was introduced into the VFL—became the central feature of Collingwood's pattern of play.

An 18 August 1905 newspaper report, referring to Condon as "that fiery football genius", described his coaching style as a "combination of brimstone oratory and skilful tactics".

=== 1899 team of "champions" ===
At the end of the 1899 season, in the process of naming his own "champion player", the football correspondent for The Argus, Reginald Wilmot ("Old Boy"), selected a team of the best players of the 1899 VFL competition:

- Backs: Maurie Collins (Essendon), Bill Proudfoot (Collingwood), Peter Burns (Geelong).
- Halfbacks: Pat Hickey (Fitzroy), George Davidson (South Melbourne), Alf Wood (Melbourne).
- Centres: Fred Leach (Collingwood), Firth McCallum (Geelong), Harry Wright (Essendon).
- Wings: Charlie Pannam (Collingwood), Eddie Drohan (Fitzroy), Herb Howson (South Melbourne).
- Forwards: Bill Jackson (Essendon), Eddy James (Geelong), Charlie Colgan (South Melbourne).
- Ruck: Mick Pleass (South Melbourne), Frank Hailwood (Collingwood), Joe McShane (Geelong).
- Rovers: Dick Condon (Collingwood), Bill McSpeerin (Fitzroy), Teddy Rankin (Geelong).

From those he considered to be the three best players — that is, Condon, Hickey, and Pleass — Wilmot selected Pat Hickey as his "champion player" of the season.

== Physical skills ==
In physical terms, Condon was an extremely flexible and well-balanced player. He was able to pick the ball up from the ground with either hand, kick place kicks, punt kicks, drop kicks, and stab kicks with either foot, and handball with either hand.

== Abrasive nature ==
Condon was far from well-balanced in terms of his threshold for violence (which was directed at his own teammates as often as his opponents), his short temper with club officials and umpires, his view that things must always be seen from his own perspective, his intolerance of failure, and his propensity for continuously abusing umpires, all of which were continuously displayed throughout his long career.

== Lifetime suspension ==
Halfway through the 1900 season, Condon was appointed captain of Collingwood. In his new role as captain, he gave the umpires an even harder time.

He abused field umpire Bill Freame on 7 July 1900 continuously throughout the match against South Melbourne at the Lake Oval after a number of decisions went against the Magpies, and he was suspended for three weeks by the VFL. Two weeks later, whilst still under VFL suspension, he got into a fist-fight with teammate Arthur Robson in the middle of Collingwood's three-quarter time huddle; the pair had to be restrained by the umpires, teammates and Collingwood club officials.

On 1 September 1900, during Collingwood's second round-robin finals match against Geelong at the Corio Oval, Condon became so upset with the umpiring of Dick Gibson during the last quarter of the match that he lost his temper and signalled for his teammates to follow him off the Corio Oval, demanding that the Collingwood match committee order the Collingwood players from the field. After umpire Gibson threatened to report the entire Collingwood team for bringing the game into disrepute, the Collingwood committee refused to do so, and instead ordered Condon and the team to either return to the field, or be expelled from the club. At that stage Collingwood was a point ahead of Geelong, but Condon's behaviour so unsettled his team that it did not score again, and lost to Geelong 6.8 (44) to 4.7 (31). It was the loss in this match that eliminated Collingwood from premiership calculations in that year.

In the final match of the three round-robin match series the following week, Collingwood played against Melbourne at the Lake Oval. The field umpire for the match, Henry "Ivo" Crapp, was considered to be the most experienced umpire in the competition. After a decision went against the Magpies in the first quarter, Condon abused Crapp throughout the remainder of the match, culminating in his infamous barrage of insults involving the umpire's daughter.

He was reported for his conduct, and the VFL Investigative Committee immediately suspended Condon for life. A newspaper report of 17 September 1900 suggested that Condon would now be able to "spend the rest of his days thinking about the joy and glory of his lost future in the game", observed that "Collingwood has turned away from him", and noted that "club discipline has outweighed any sympathy for a fallen hero". The report provided additional details of the incident:

[The third match of the round-robin series against Melbourne was] umpired by an experienced man in H. "Ivo" Crapp. Condon would not leave Crapp alone all day. He sealed his fate when he was free-kicked for tripping a Melbourne man in the second quarter and said to Crapp: "Your girl's a bloody whore."

We may be left only memories of this man who made a specialty of twisting in the air as he took a mark, hitting the ground running towards goal. He could pick the ball up with each hand with equal sureness, and kick accurately, short or long, with both feet. He was fast, had tremendous balance, and was the best man in the game at getting out of trouble — except for his mouth.

== Appeal and reinstatement ==
Over an eighteen-month period, Condon appealed against his lifetime ban on three occasions.

His last appeal was successful, and, having not played a single game in 1901, he played his first return game for Collingwood against Melbourne at the Melbourne Cricket Ground on 19 May 1902.

== Senior football career ==
- 1894–1896, 1897–1900, 1902–1906: 194 games, 115 goals for Collingwood (45 games, 14 goals in the VFA and 149 games, 101 goals in the VFL).
- 1899–1900: Was intermittently captain of Collingwood.
- 1905–1906: Captain-coach of Collingwood (37 games, 26 wins, 11 losses)
  - His abrasive character caused so much discontent at Collingwood that he was asked to leave at the end of 1906.
- 1907: Spent season in Tasmania as a field umpire.
- 1908–1909: 32 games, 26 goals for Richmond.
- 1908–1909: Coach of Richmond (36 games, 12 wins, 24 losses) in its first two years in the VFL competition.
  - His abrasive character caused so much discontent at Richmond that he was asked to leave at the end of 1909.
- 1910: Non-playing coach of New South Wales Football League team East Sydney.

== Legacy ==
For more than a century, Condon was the only Collingwood player to have played for ten years across 100-plus games, win a Copeland Trophy and yet not be made a life member. At Collingwood's 2013 annual general meeting, 107 years after his last match for Collingwood and 67 years after his death, the club bestowed life membership on Condon. The award was accepted by his great-nephew, Bob Condon, on behalf of the Condon family.

== Death ==
Condon died in Sydney on 27 December 1946.

== See also ==
- 1908 Melbourne Carnival
- The Footballers' Alphabet
