= Herb Howson =

Australian rules footballer, cricketer, and coach

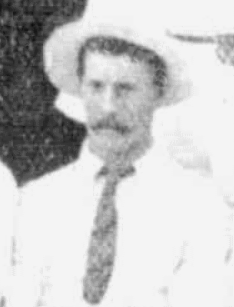

Personal information
- Full name: Herbert Howson
- Born: 11 August 1872; Newstead, Victoria
- Died: 8 May 1948 (aged 75); Murrumbeena, Victoria
- Position: Wingman

Playing career^{1}
Years	Club	Games (Goals)
1893–1896	South Melbourne (VFA)	52 (0)
1897–1908	South Melbourne	152 (2)
Total		204 (2)

Coaching career
Years	Club	Games (W–L–D)
1918–1919	South Melbourne	33 (27–6–0)
- ^{1} Playing statistics correct to the end of 1908.

Career highlights
- South Melbourne premiership coach 1918; South Melbourne captain 1906

Herbert Howson (11 August 1872 – 8 May 1948) was an Australian rules footballer who played with South Melbourne in both the Victorian Football Association (VFA) and the Victorian Football League (VFL).

== Family ==
The son of Harry Josiah Howson (1849-1923), and Margaritta Armstrong Howson (1848-1922), née Firman, Herbert Howson, widely known as "Bert", was born at Newstead, Victoria on 11 August 1872.

His brother, Henry Josiah Howson (1872-1948), also played for South Melbourne in the VFL.

He was the cousin of the world-famous soprano, Emma Howson 1844-1928).

== Football ==
A wingman, Howson played with South Melbourne for four seasons in the Victorian Football Association (VFA) — including the 1896 premiership match loss to Collingwood, in which he played on the wing — before he joined their inaugural VFL side in 1897. He was part of the team's 1899 Grand Final one-point loss to Fitzroy.

=== 1899 team of "champions" ===
At the end of the 1899 season, in the process of naming his own "champion player", the football correspondent for The Argus, Reginald Wilmot ("Old Boy"), selected a team of the best players of the 1899 VFL competition:

- Backs: Maurie Collins (Essendon), Bill Proudfoot (Collingwood), Peter Burns (Geelong).
- Halfbacks: Pat Hickey (Fitzroy), George Davidson (South Melbourne), Alf Wood (Melbourne).
- Centres: Fred Leach (Collingwood), Firth McCallum (Geelong), Harry Wright (Essendon).
- Wings: Charlie Pannam (Collingwood), Eddie Drohan (Fitzroy), Herb Howson (South Melbourne).
- Forwards: Bill Jackson (Essendon), Eddy James (Geelong), Charlie Colgan (South Melbourne).
- Ruck: Mick Pleass (South Melbourne), Frank Hailwood (Collingwood), Joe McShane (Geelong).
- Rovers: Dick Condon (Collingwood), Bill McSpeerin (Fitzroy), Teddy Rankin (Geelong).

From those he considered to be the three best players — that is, Condon, Hickey, and Pleass — Wilmot selected Pat Hickey as his "champion player" of the season.

== Cricket ==
In 1903 he appeared in a first-class cricket match for Victoria, against Tasmania. He scored 40 in his first innings and took a couple of wickets.

== Coaching ==
Howson was appointed coach of South Melbourne, in a non-playing capacity, in 1918 and led them to the premiership with the help of Henry Elms, who shared the coaching duties with him. That season the club were premiers and the following season finished third.

== Club Secretary ==
He was the club secretary of the South Melbourne Football Club for 17 years (1904–1921).

== Death ==
He died at Murrumbeena, Victoria, on 8 May 1948.

== See also ==
- List of Victoria first-class cricketers
- The Footballers' Alphabet
