= Eddie Drohan =

Australian rules footballer (1876–1938)

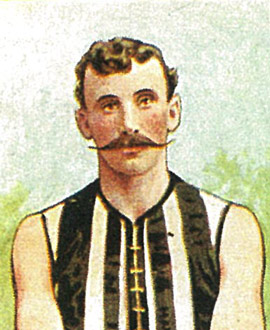
- Drohan in 1906

Personal information
- Full name: Edward Patrick Drohan
- Born: 17 July 1876; Warrnambool, Victoria, Australia
- Died: 28 July 1938 (aged 62); Cheltenham, Victoria
- Original team: Fitzroy Juniors
- Position: Wing

Playing career^{1}
Years	Club	Games (Goals)
1898–1902	Fitzroy	75 (5)
1903–1908	Collingwood	96 (54)
Total		171 (59)

Coaching career
Years	Club	Games (W–L–D)
1910	Melbourne	18 (4–14–0)
1911	St Kilda	18 (2–16–0)
Total		36 (6–30–0)
- ^{1} Playing statistics correct to the end of 1911.

Career highlights
- 3× VFL premiership player: 1898, 1899, 1903; Collingwood captain: 1908

Edward Patrick Drohan (17 July 1876 – 28 July 1938) was an Australian rules footballer who played for the Fitzroy Football Club and Collingwood Football Club in the Victorian Football League (VFL) before becoming an umpire and a coach.

== Football ==
=== Fitzroy (VFL) ===
Drohan made his debut for Fitzroy in 1898 and played in their premiership side that year and the following season. In both Grand Finals he played on a wing, the position he occupied for most of his career.

=== 1899 team of "champions" ===
At the end of the 1899 season, in the process of naming his own "champion player", the football correspondent for The Argus, Reginald Wilmot ("Old Boy"), selected a team of the best players of the 1899 VFL competition:

- Backs: Maurie Collins (Essendon), Bill Proudfoot (Collingwood), Peter Burns (Geelong).
- Halfbacks: Pat Hickey (Fitzroy), George Davidson (South Melbourne), Alf Wood (Melbourne).
- Centres: Fred Leach (Collingwood), Firth McCallum (Geelong), Harry Wright (Essendon).
- Wings: Charlie Pannam (Collingwood), Eddie Drohan (Fitzroy), Herb Howson (South Melbourne).
- Forwards: Bill Jackson (Essendon), Eddy James (Geelong), Charlie Colgan (South Melbourne).
- Ruck: Mick Pleass (South Melbourne), Frank Hailwood (Collingwood), Joe McShane (Geelong).
- Rovers: Dick Condon (Collingwood), Bill McSpeerin (Fitzroy), Teddy Rankin (Geelong).

From those he considered to be the three best players – that is, Condon, Hickey, and Pleass – Wilmot selected Pat Hickey as his "champion player" of the season.

=== Collingwood (VFL) ===
Drohan crossed to Collingwood in 1903 and finished the season as a member of another premiership winning side, becoming the first person to play in a VFL/AFL premiership for two different sides.

=== Umpire and coach ===
After retiring in 1908 Drohan spent a couple of years as a field umpire before joining Melbourne as coach in 1910. He had little success, winning just four games for the season and in 1911 he was chosen to coach St Kilda. Again his side struggled, this time winning just two games. Later Drohan also acted as a goal umpire and a steward.

== Sources ==
- Atkinson, G. (1982) Everything you ever wanted to know about Australian rules football but couldn't be bothered asking, The Five Mile Press: Melbourne. ISBN 0 86788 009 0.
