= Maurie Collins =

Australian rules footballer (1876–1943)

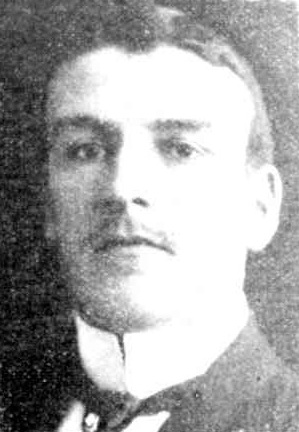
- Collins in 1901

Personal information
- Full name: Maurice Ignatius Collins
- Born: 21 July 1876; Clifton Hill, Victoria
- Died: 8 November 1943 (aged 67); Kew, Victoria
- Original team: Albert Park
- Position: Defender

Playing career^{1}
Years	Club	Games (Goals)
1897–1904	Essendon	97/98 (7)
- ^{1} Playing statistics correct to the end of 1904.

Career highlights
- VFL premiership player: 1901

Maurice Ignatius Collins (21 July 1876 – 8 November 1943) was an Australian rules footballer who played for Essendon in the Victorian Football League (VFL).

== Family ==
The son of Timothy Collins (1843-1899), and Catherine Collins (1846-1928), née Nunan, Maurice Ignatius Collins was born at Clifton Hill, Victoria on 21 July 1876.

He married Eileen Mary Marsh (1886-1968) in 1906. They had four children; one of whom, Alan Collins (1914-1914) died in his infancy. In 1927, another of their three sons, Maurice Xavier Collins (1907-1955), was captain of the Old Xaverians Football Club in the Metropolitan Amateur Football Association (MAFA).

== Football ==
=== Essendon (VFL) ===
Collins played his early football with the Albert Park Football Club. He was injured during the 1897 VFL finals series but according to some sources made one appearance. Collins, a defender, was a member of Essendon's 1901 premiership team, as a back pocket. A VFL representative, he was the vice captain of Essendon for his final season.

=== 1899 team of "champions" ===
At the end of the 1899 season, in the process of naming his own "champion player", the football correspondent for The Argus, Reginald Wilmot ("Old Boy"), selected a team of the best players of the 1899 VFL competition:

- Backs: Maurie Collins (Essendon), Bill Proudfoot (Collingwood), Peter Burns (Geelong).
- Halfbacks: Pat Hickey (Fitzroy), George Davidson (South Melbourne), Alf Wood (Melbourne).
- Centres: Fred Leach (Collingwood), Firth McCallum (Geelong), Harry Wright (Essendon).
- Wings: Charlie Pannam (Collingwood), Eddie Drohan (Fitzroy), Herb Howson (South Melbourne).
- Forwards: Bill Jackson (Essendon), Eddy James (Geelong), Charlie Colgan (South Melbourne).
- Ruck: Mick Pleass (South Melbourne), Frank Hailwood (Collingwood), Joe McShane (Geelong).
- Rovers: Dick Condon (Collingwood), Bill McSpeerin (Fitzroy), Teddy Rankin (Geelong).

From those he considered to be the three best players — that is, Condon, Hickey, and Pleass — Wilmot selected Pat Hickey as his "champion player" of the season.

== Death ==
He died at Kew, Victoria on 8 November 1943.
