= Pat Hickey (footballer) =

Australian rules footballer (1871–1946)

Personal information
- Full name: Patrick Joseph Hickey
- Born: 3 September 1871; Timor, Victoria
- Died: 4 February 1946 (aged 74); Werribee, Victoria
- Original teams: Cumberland, Maryborough
- Height: 183 cm (6 ft 0 in)
- Weight: 90 kg (198 lb)
- Position: Centre half-back

Playing career^{1}
Years	Club	Games (Goals)
1895–1896	Fitzroy (VFA)	19 (0)
1897–1901	Fitzroy	61 (3)
Total		80 (3)
- ^{1} Playing statistics correct to the end of 1901.

Career highlights
- 2× VFL premierships: 1898, 1899; Fitzroy Club Champion: 1899

Patrick Joseph Hickey (3 September 1871 – 4 February 1946) was an Australian rules footballer who played with Fitzroy in the early days of the Victorian Football League (VFL).

== Family ==
His brother, Con, also played with Fitzroy in the VFA and was later an administrator for Fitzroy and the VFL.

== Football ==
A centre half-back, Hickey played for Fitzroy in the Victorian Football Association, winning a premiership in 1895, before being part of the inaugural Fitzroy side in the VFL. He played in their 1898 and 1899 VFL premierships. Aside from being one of the best afield in the 1899 Grand Final, he also won Fitzroy's best and fairest award that year.

=== 1899 team of "champions" ===
At the end of the 1899 season, in the process of naming his own "champion player", the football correspondent for The Argus, Reginald Wilmot ("Old Boy"), selected a team of the best players of the 1899 VFL competition:

- Backs: Maurie Collins (Essendon), Bill Proudfoot (Collingwood), Peter Burns (Geelong).
- Halfbacks: Pat Hickey (Fitzroy), George Davidson (South Melbourne), Alf Wood (Melbourne).
- Centres: Fred Leach (Collingwood), Firth McCallum (Geelong), Harry Wright (Essendon).
- Wings: Charlie Pannam (Collingwood), Eddie Drohan (Fitzroy), Herb Howson (South Melbourne).
- Forwards: Bill Jackson (Essendon), Eddy James (Geelong), Charlie Colgan (South Melbourne).
- Ruck: Mick Pleass (South Melbourne), Frank Hailwood (Collingwood), Joe McShane (Geelong).
- Rovers: Dick Condon (Collingwood), Bill McSpeerin (Fitzroy), Teddy Rankin (Geelong).

From those he considered to be the three best players – that is, Condon, Hickey, and Pleass – Wilmot selected Pat Hickey as his "champion player" of the season.

== Shire President ==
He served as the President of the Werribee Shire Council from September 1929 to September 1930.

== Death ==
He died at his residence, in Werribee, Victoria, on 4 February 1946.
