= Charlie Pannam (footballer, born 1874) =

Australian rules footballer and coach (1874–1952)

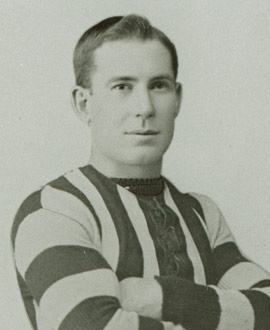
- Pannam with Collingwood circa 1900

Personal information
- Full name: Charles Henry Pannam
- Born: 2 October 1874; Daylesford, Victoria
- Died: 29 October 1952 (aged 78); Abbotsford, Victoria, Australia
- Original team: Collingwood Juniors
- Height: 173 cm (5 ft 8 in)
- Weight: 79.5 kg (175 lb)

Playing career^{1}
Years	Club	Games (Goals)
1894–1907	Collingwood	229 (116)
1907–1908	Richmond	27 (33)
1909	Preston	15 (13)
1914	Northcote	3 (3)

Coaching career
Years	Club	Games (W–L–D)
1912	Richmond	18 (3–15–0)
- ^{1} Playing statistics correct to the end of 1908.

Career highlights
- VFA premiership player 1896; 2× VFL premiership player: 1902, 1903; Collingwood captain: 1905; Richmond captain: 1907–1908; 2× Collingwood leading goalkicker: 1904, 1905; VFL Leading Goalkicker: 1905

Charles Henry Pannam (2 October 1874 – 29 October 1952) was an Australian rules footballer who played for the Collingwood Football Club in the Victorian Football Association (VFA) between 1894 and 1896 then in the Victorian Football League (VFL) between 1897 and 1906. He then played for the Richmond Football Club in the VFA in 1907 then in the VFL in 1908. He was senior coach of Richmond in 1907 and 1912.

== Family ==
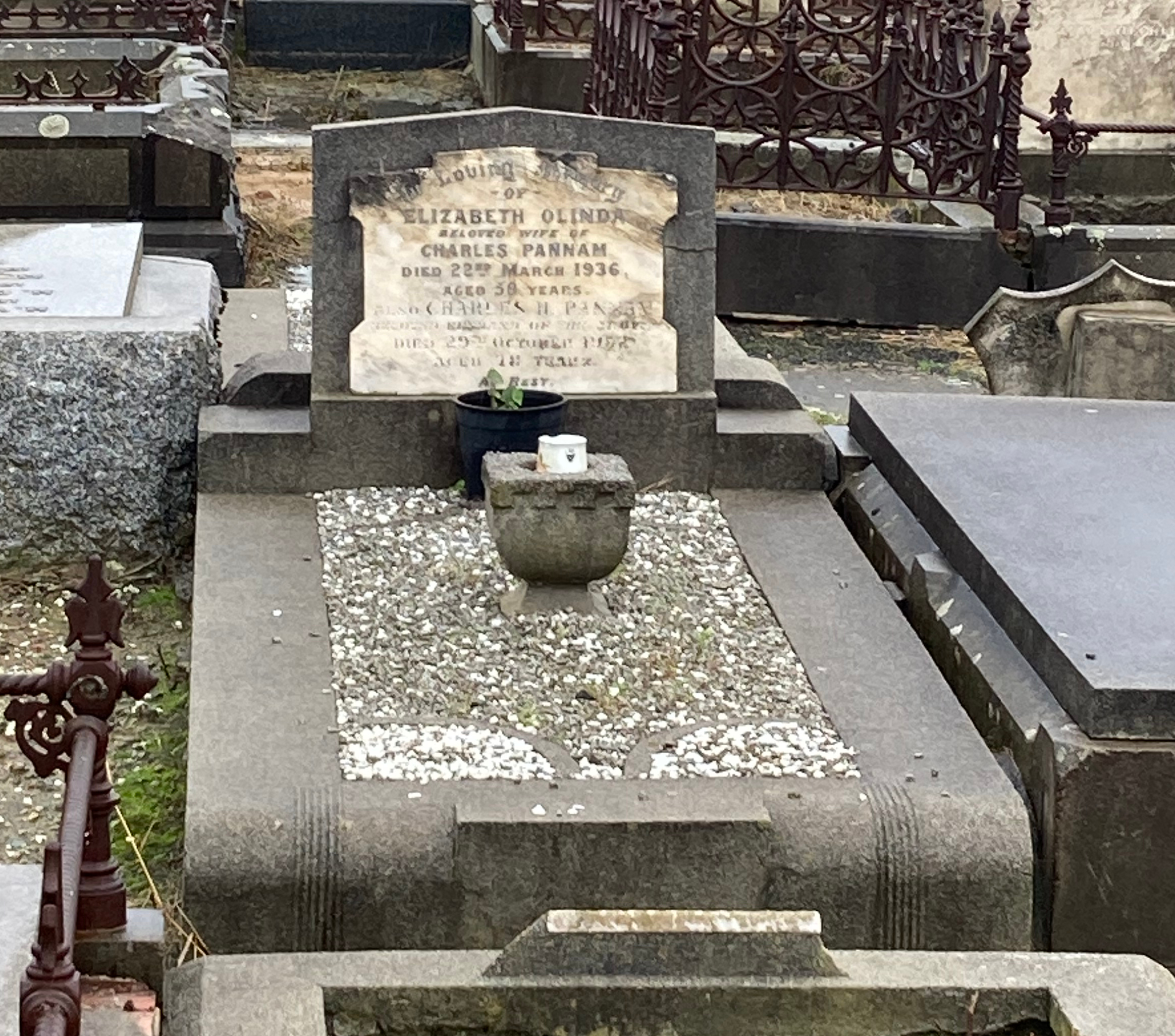
Pannam's grave at Melbourne General Cemetery

The son of a Greek immigrant father, Ioannis ("John") Pannam (1832–1899) and an Australian mother of Welsh descent, Anne Pannam (1841–1898), née Hughes, Charles Henry Pannam was born at Daylesford on 2 October 1874.

His father's family name of Pannamopoulos had been shortened to Pannam when he emigrated from Greece to Australia in 1856. His father, John, had originally arrived in Newcastle, NSW in 1855, however, he was charged as a deserter and sent back to Greece, only to return and settle the following year.

Charlie Pannam died at Abbotsford, Victoria on 29 October 1952, and was buried at Melbourne General Cemetery.

The brother of Collingwood footballer Albert Pannam, he was the father of Collingwood and Richmond footballer and Richmond coach Alby Pannam, and of Collingwood and South Melbourne footballer and South Melbourne coach Charlie Pannam. Collingwood captain Lou Richards and Collingwood footballer (and interim coach for two matches in 1974) Ron Richards were his grandsons.

He is the great-great grandfather of Ed Richards (footballer).

== Football ==
=== Collingwood (VFA) ===
He played for three seasons with the Collingwood club in the VFA competition from 1894 to 1896.

=== Collingwood (VFL) ===
A wingman and a rover, he played with Collingwood in the VFL competition for eleven years (1897–1907). He was the first VFL player to reach the 50-, 100-, and 150-game milestone, and he was the VFL's Leading Goalkicker in 1905.

==== 1899 team of "champions" ====
At the end of the 1899 season, in the process of naming his own "champion player", the football correspondent for The Argus, Reginald Wilmot ("Old Boy"), selected a team of the best players of the 1899 VFL competition:

- Backs: Maurie Collins (Essendon), Bill Proudfoot (Collingwood), Peter Burns (Geelong).
- Halfbacks: Pat Hickey (Fitzroy), George Davidson (South Melbourne), Alf Wood (Melbourne).
- Centres: Fred Leach (Collingwood), Firth McCallum (Geelong), Harry Wright (Essendon).
- Wings: Charlie Pannam (Collingwood), Eddie Drohan (Fitzroy), Herb Howson (South Melbourne).
- Forwards: Bill Jackson (Essendon), Eddy James (Geelong), Charlie Colgan (South Melbourne).
- Ruck: Mick Pleass (South Melbourne), Frank Hailwood (Collingwood), Joe McShane (Geelong).
- Rovers: Dick Condon (Collingwood), Bill McSpeerin (Fitzroy), Teddy Rankin (Geelong).

From those he considered to be the three best players — that is, Condon, Hickey, and Pleass — Wilmot selected Pat Hickey as his "champion player" of the season.

=== Richmond (VFA) ===
Having played his last two games for Collingwood in rounds one and two of 1907, he transferred to the VFA and, as captain-coach played 13 games.

=== Richmond (VFL) ===
With Richmond admitted to the VFL competition in 1908, and with his Collingwood team-mate Dick Condon appointed coach, he was Richmond's first captain in its VFL history.

=== Preston (VFA) ===
[data missing]

=== Northcote (VFA) ===
[data missing]

== Hall of Fame ==
In 1996, Pannam was inducted into the Australian Football Hall of Fame.
