= Alf Wood (Australian footballer) =

Australian rules footballer (1875–1945)

Personal information
- Full name: Alfred Mathew Wood
- Born: 15 February 1875; Glenlyon, Victoria
- Died: 16 November 1945 (aged 70); East Melbourne, Victoria
- Original team: Maryborough
- Position: Defence

Playing career^{1}
Years	Club	Games (Goals)
1897–1899	Melbourne	43 (4)
- ^{1} Playing statistics correct to the end of 1899.

Alfred Mathew Wood (15 February 1875 – 16 November 1945) was an Australian rules footballer who played for the Melbourne Football Club in the Victorian Football League (VFL).

== Football ==
On many occasions the press (mistakenly) identified him as "Woods", rather than "Wood".

=== Melbourne (VFL) ===
His first game for Melbourne was on the half-back flank, against South Melbourne, at the Lake Oval, on 8 May 1897, the first round of the first year of the new VFL competition.

=== VFL representative ===
Wood played in the VFL team against Ballarat Football League in 1898.

=== 1899 team of "champions" ===
At the end of the 1899 season, in the process of naming his own "champion player", the football correspondent for The Argus, Reginald Wilmot ("Old Boy"), selected a team of the best players of the 1899 VFL competition:

- Backs: Maurie Collins (Essendon), Bill Proudfoot (Collingwood), Peter Burns (Geelong);
- Halfbacks: Pat Hickey (Fitzroy), George Davidson (South Melbourne), Alf Wood (Melbourne);
- Centres: Fred Leach (Collingwood), Firth McCallum (Geelong), Harry Wright (Essendon);
- Wings: Charlie Pannam (Collingwood), Eddie Drohan (Fitzroy), Herb Howson (South Melbourne);
- Forwards: Bill Jackson (Essendon), Eddy James (Geelong), Charlie Colgan (South Melbourne);
- Ruck: Mick Pleass (South Melbourne), Frank Hailwood (Collingwood), Joe McShane (Geelong);
- Rovers: Dick Condon (Collingwood), Bill McSpeerin (Fitzroy), Teddy Rankin (Geelong).

From those he considered to be the three best players — that is, Condon, Hickey, and Pleass — Wilmot selected Pat Hickey as his "champion player" of the season.

== Death ==
He died at a private hospital in East Melbourne, Victoria on 16 November 1945.
