= Fred Leach =

Australian rules footballer (1878–1908)

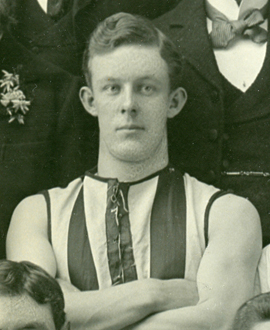
- Leach in 1901

Personal information
- Full name: John Frederick Leach
- Born: 6 March 1878; Heidelberg, Victoria
- Died: 14 April 1908 (aged 30); Surrey Hills, Victoria
- Original team: Boroondara
- Height: 183 cm (6 ft 0 in)
- Weight: 83 kg (183 lb)

Playing career^{1}
Years	Club	Games (Goals)
1897–1903	Collingwood	84 (8)
- ^{1} Playing statistics correct to the end of 1903.

Career highlights
- VFL premiership player: 1902

John Frederick Leach (6 March 1878 – 14 April 1908) was an Australian rules footballer who played for the Collingwood Football Club in the Victorian Football League (VFL).

== Family ==
The son of Thomas Leach (1847–1916), and Emma Bunkin Leach (1847–1893), née Stuckey, John Frederick Leach was born in Heidelberg, Victoria on 6 March 1878.

=== Brothers ===
His two brothers, Arthur Thomas Leach (1876–1948) and Edward Hale "Ted" Leach (1883–1965) also played for Collingwood.

== Football ==
Leach was a centreman in the losing Grand Final side of 1901, but played at centre half-back in the 1902 premiership team.

=== 1899 team of "champions" ===
At the end of the 1899 season, in the process of naming his own "champion player", the football correspondent for The Argus, Reginald Wilmot ("Old Boy"), selected a team of the best players of the 1899 VFL competition:

- Backs: Maurie Collins (Essendon), Bill Proudfoot (Collingwood), Peter Burns (Geelong).
- Halfbacks: Pat Hickey (Fitzroy), George Davidson (South Melbourne), Alf Wood (Melbourne).
- Centres: Fred Leach (Collingwood), Firth McCallum (Geelong), Harry Wright (Essendon).
- Wings: Charlie Pannam (Collingwood), Eddie Drohan (Fitzroy), Herb Howson (South Melbourne).
- Forwards: Bill Jackson (Essendon), Eddy James (Geelong), Charlie Colgan (South Melbourne).
- Ruck: Mick Pleass (South Melbourne), Frank Hailwood (Collingwood), Joe McShane (Geelong).
- Rovers: Dick Condon (Collingwood), Bill McSpeerin (Fitzroy), Teddy Rankin (Geelong).

From those he considered to be the three best players – that is, Condon, Hickey, and Pleass – Wilmot selected Pat Hickey as his "champion player" of the season.

== Death ==
He died of typhoid fever at his father's residence in Surrey Hills on 14 April 1908.
