= 1902 VFL grand final =

Grand final of the 1902 Victorian Football League season

1902 VFL Grand Final

Collingwood	Essendon
9.6 (60)	3.9 (27)
	1	2	3	4
COL	1.2 (8)	3.2 (20)	5.5 (35)	9.6 (60)
ESS	1.3 (9)	2.7 (19)	3.7 (25)	3.9 (27)
- Date: 20 September 1902
- Stadium: Melbourne Cricket Ground
- Attendance: 35,202

The 1902 VFL Grand Final was an Australian rules football game contested between the Collingwood Football Club and Essendon Football Club, held at the Melbourne Cricket Ground in Melbourne on 20 September 1902. It was the 5th annual Grand Final of the Victorian Football League, staged to determine the premiers for the 1902 VFL season. The match, attended by 35,202 spectators, was won by Collingwood by a margin of 33 points, marking that club's first premiership victory.

== Teams ==
Collingwood	Essendon

Collingwood
B:	George Lockwood	Bill Proudfoot	Matthew Fell
HB:	Bob Rush	Fred Leach	Alf Dummett
C:	Charlie Pannam	Con McCormack	John Allan
HF:	Jack Incoll	Ted Rowell	George Angus
F:	Harry Pears	Teddy Lockwood	Arthur Leach
Foll:	Frank Hailwood	Lardie Tulloch (c)	Dick Condon

Essendon
B:	Fred Mann	Jack Geggie	Bill Robinson
HB:	Jim Anderson	Hugh Gavin (c)	George Hastings
C:	Ted Kennedy	Harry Wright	Herc Vollugi
HF:	Fred Hiskins	Albert Thurgood	Vic Hutchens
F:	Jimmy Larkin	Ted Kinnear	Pat O'Loughlin
Foll:	George Martin	Jack McKenzie	Billy Griffith

- Umpire – Henry "Ivo" Crapp

== Statistics ==
=== Goalkickers ===
Collingwood:

- T Lockwood 3
- T Rowell 3
- J Allan 1
- G Angus 1
- H Pears 1

Essendon:

- F Hiskins 1
- P O'Loughlin 1
- A Thurgood 1

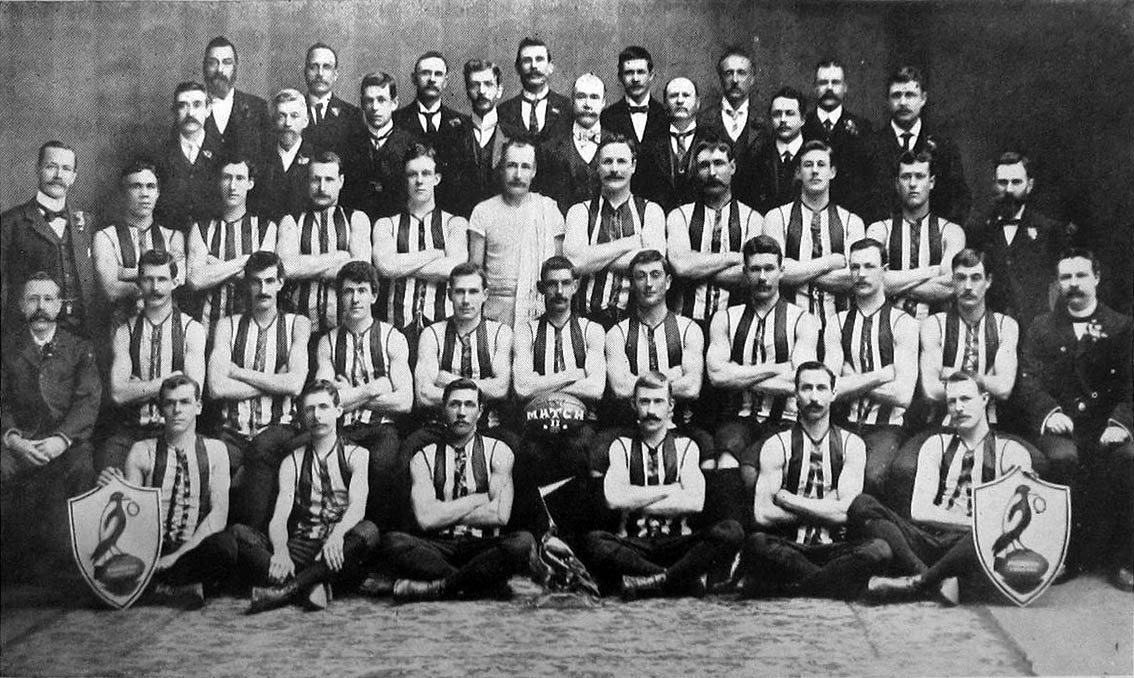
Collingwood, Premiers

== See also ==
- 1902 VFL season
