= Bill Jackson (Australian footballer) =

Australian rules footballer & cyclist (1874–1921)

Personal information
- Full name: William Charles Jackson
- Born: 13 April 1874; Stawell, Victoria
- Died: 11 September 1921 (aged 47); Collie, Western Australia
- Original team: Ballarat Imperials
- Positions: Follower, forward

Playing career^{1}
| Years | Club | Games (Goals) |
| 1898–1900 | Essendon | 27 (22) |
| 1903 | St Kilda | 6 (3) |
| Total | | 33 (25) |
- ^{1} Playing statistics correct to the end of 1903.

Bill 'Newhaven' Jackson (13 April 1874 – 11 September 1921) was an Australian cyclist and an Australian rules footballer who played for Essendon and St Kilda in the Victorian Football League (VFL).

== Football ==
Jackson, who was nicknamed after a Melbourne Cup winning horse, came to Essendon from Ballarat Imperials. He played as a follower in the 1898 VFL Grand Final loss to Fitzroy but was also used as a forward during his career. Jackson injured his knee early in Essendon's 1900 semi final encounter with Melbourne and retired. He returned in the 1903 season as captain of St Kilda.

=== 1899 team of "champions" ===
At the end of the 1899 season, in the process of naming his own "champion player", the football correspondent for The Argus, Reginald Wilmot ("Old Boy"), selected a team of the best players of the 1899 VFL competition:

- Backs: Maurie Collins (Essendon), Bill Proudfoot (Collingwood), Peter Burns (Geelong).
- Halfbacks: Pat Hickey (Fitzroy), George Davidson (South Melbourne), Alf Wood (Melbourne).
- Centres: Fred Leach (Collingwood), Firth McCallum (Geelong), Harry Wright (Essendon).
- Wings: Charlie Pannam (Collingwood), Eddie Drohan (Fitzroy), Herb Howson (South Melbourne).
- Forwards: Bill Jackson (Essendon), Eddy James (Geelong), Charlie Colgan (South Melbourne).
- Ruck: Mick Pleass (South Melbourne), Frank Hailwood (Collingwood), Joe McShane (Geelong).
- Rovers: Dick Condon (Collingwood), Bill McSpeerin (Fitzroy), Teddy Rankin (Geelong).

From those he considered to be the three best players — that is, Condon, Hickey, and Pleass — Wilmot selected Pat Hickey as his "champion player" of the season.

== Cycling ==
Also a successful cyclist, Jackson won Melbourne to Warrnambool Classic in 1897 and two Australian Cycling Championships.

== See also ==
- The Footballers' Alphabet
