= Bill McSpeerin =

Australian rules footballer (1874–1943)

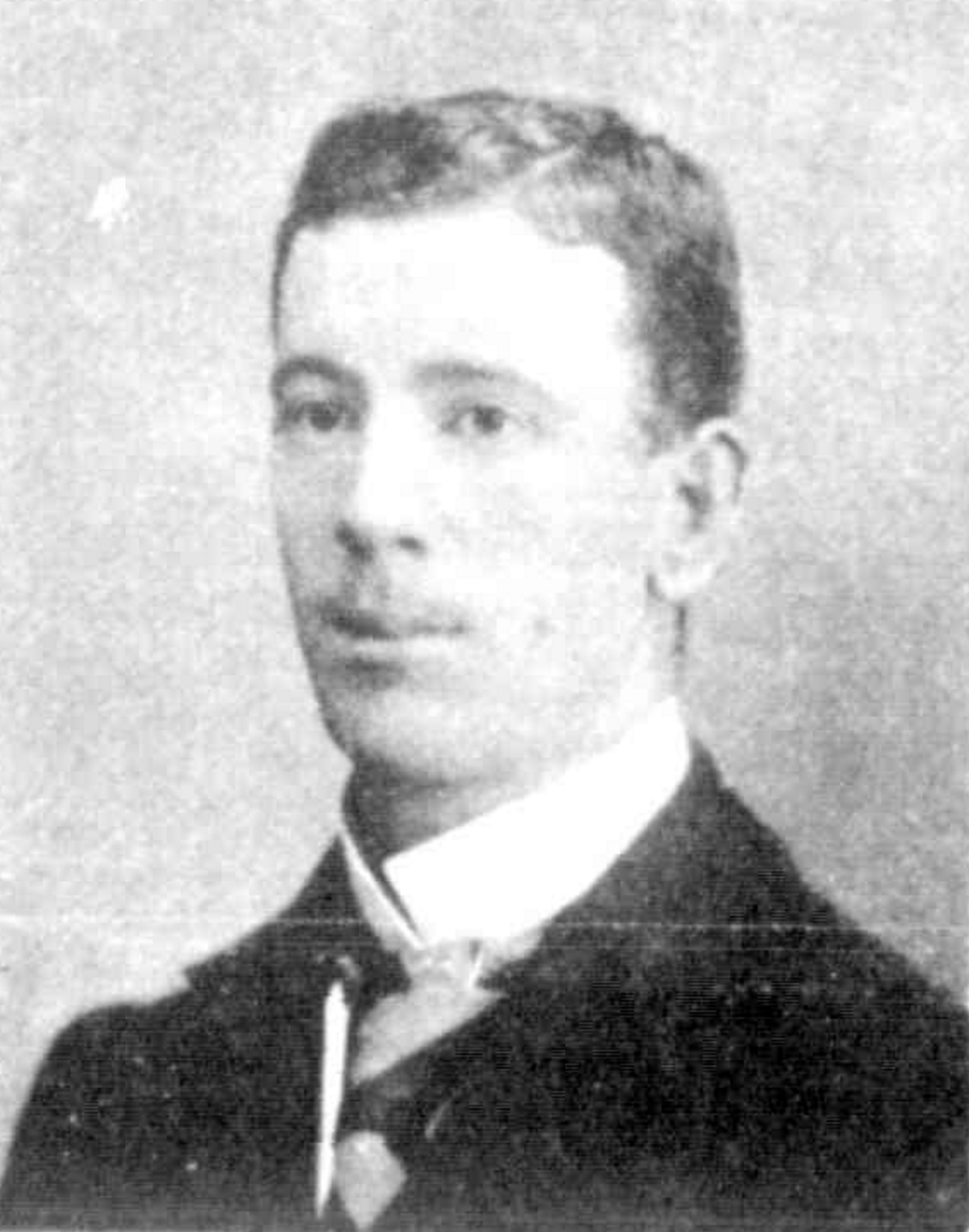
- McSpeerin in 1899

Personal information
- Full name: William Joseph McSpeerin
- Nickname: The Shark
- Born: 25 September 1874; Carlton, Victoria
- Died: 3 June 1943 (aged 68); Brunswick East, Victoria
- Position: Rover

Playing career^{1}
Years	Club	Games (Goals)
1894-1896	Fitzroy (VFA)	43 (15)
1897–1904	Fitzroy	126 (93)
Total		169 (108)
- ^{1} Playing statistics correct to the end of 1904.

Career highlights
- VFA premiership player 1895; 3× VFL premiership player: 1898, 1899, 1904; Fitzroy captain: 1901–1902; Fitroy leading goalkicker: 1899

William Joseph McSpeerin (25 September 1874 – 3 June 1943) was an Australian rules footballer who played for the Fitzroy Football Club in the Victorian Football League (VFL).

== Family ==
The son of James McSpeerin (1846–1909), and Catherine McSpeerin (1842–1890), née Reid, William Joseph McSpeerin was born at Carlton, Victoria on 25 September 1874.

He married Mary Anna "Marie" Rau (1876–1961) in 1906.

== Football ==
A rover, McSpeerin debuted with Fitzroy when the club was still in the Victorian Football Association (VFA) and was a member of their 1895 premiership side. When the Victorian Football League was formed in 1897, McSpeerin was a key member of the team and appeared in 10 out of 14 games that season, including one match against St Kilda where he reportedly ran the entire length of the oval to kick a goal.

McSpeerin ("never a burly man, but tough as leather and supple as whipcord") became one of the leading players of the early VFL years, playing in Fitzroy premierships in 1898 and 1899, being appointed club captain in 1901, and in 1903 becoming the first Fitzroy footballer to play 100 VFL games.

McSpeerin retired at the end of the 1904 VFL season, his last game being Fitzroy's Grand Final win over Carlton.

=== 1899 team of "champions" ===
At the end of the 1899 season, in the process of naming his own "champion player", the football correspondent for The Argus, Reginald Wilmot ("Old Boy"), selected a team of the best players of the 1899 VFL competition:

- Backs: Maurie Collins (Essendon), Bill Proudfoot (Collingwood), Peter Burns (Geelong).
- Halfbacks: Pat Hickey (Fitzroy), George Davidson (South Melbourne), Alf Wood (Melbourne).
- Centres: Fred Leach (Collingwood), Firth McCallum (Geelong), Harry Wright (Essendon).
- Wings: Charlie Pannam (Collingwood), Eddie Drohan (Fitzroy), Herb Howson (South Melbourne).
- Forwards: Bill Jackson (Essendon), Eddy James (Geelong), Charlie Colgan (South Melbourne).
- Ruck: Mick Pleass (South Melbourne), Frank Hailwood (Collingwood), Joe McShane (Geelong).
- Rovers: Dick Condon (Collingwood), Bill McSpeerin (Fitzroy), Teddy Rankin (Geelong).

From those he considered to be the three best players — that is, Condon, Hickey, and Pleass — Wilmot selected Pat Hickey as his "champion player" of the season.

== Death ==
He died at East Brunswick on 3 June 1943.
