= Teddy Rankin =

Australian rules footballer (1872–1944)

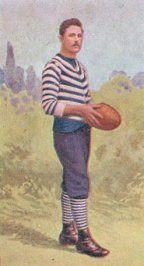

Personal information
- Full name: Edwin Walter Rankin
- Born: 11 March 1872; Geelong, Victoria
- Died: 31 July 1944 (aged 72); Geelong, Victoria
- Original team: Riversdale (GDFA)
- Height: 178 cm (5 ft 10 in)
- Weight: 74 kg (163 lb)

Playing career^{1}
Years	Club	Games (Goals)
1891–1896	Geelong (VFA)	88 (14)
1897–1910	Geelong (VFL)	180 (35)
Total		268 (49)
- ^{1} Playing statistics correct to the end of 1910.

Edwin Walter "Teddy" Rankin (11 March 1872 – 31 July 1944) was an Australian rules footballer, originally with Riversdale, who began playing with Geelong in the VFA in 1891, and later played in the Victorian Football League (VFL).

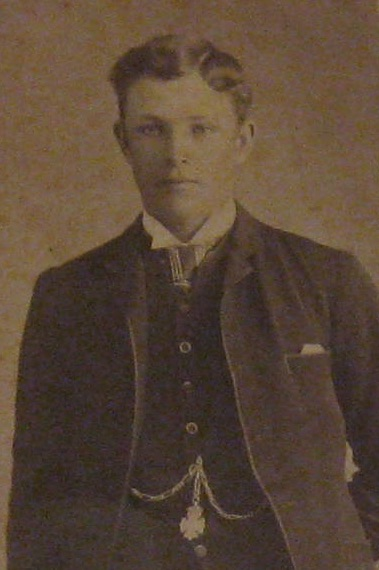
Studio portrait (c.1892) Edwin Walter "Teddy" Rankin.

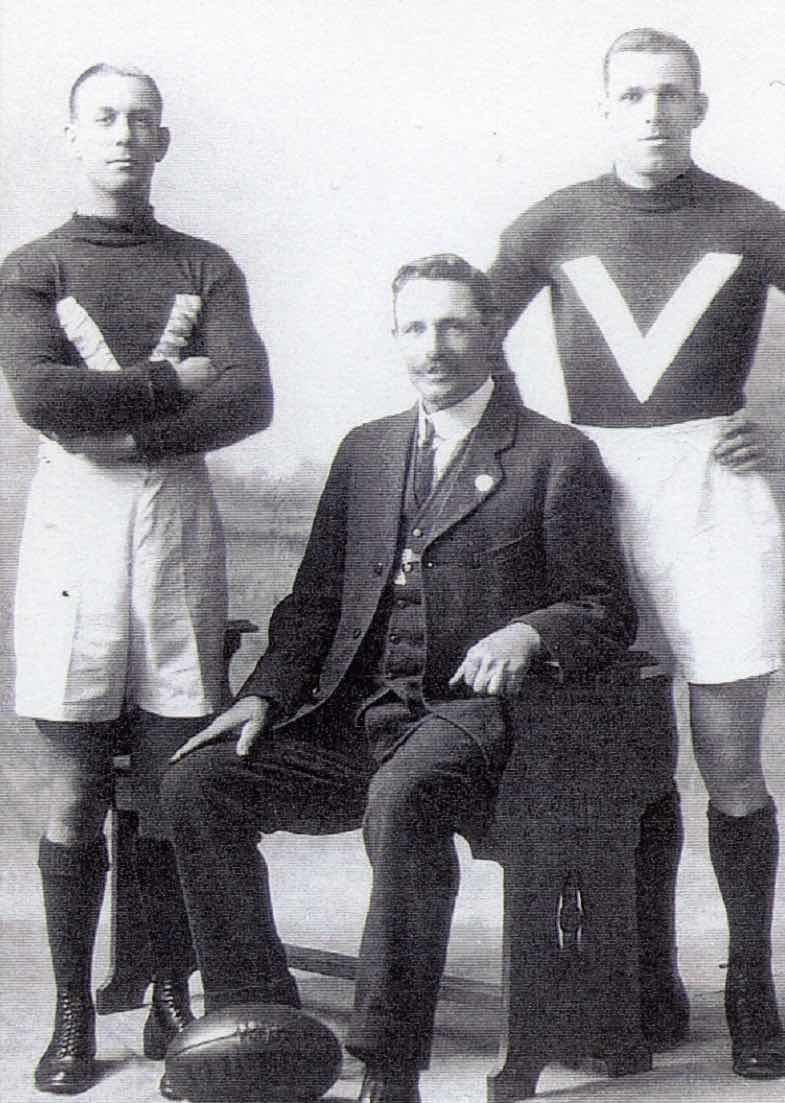
Cliff and Bert Rankin with their father, on the occasion of their selection in the 1923 Victorian team.

== Family ==
The son of Walter Rankin (1849–1930), and Sarah Rankin, née Austin, Edwin Walter Rankin was born in Geelong, Victoria on 11 March 1872.

=== Brothers ===
Two of his brothers played for Geelong Football Club: Tom Rankin (1881–1958), 47 games (1904–1906), and Samuel John Rankin (1872–1958) (who was never selected in the VFL team's First XVIII).

=== Spouses ===
Rankin married Louisa Jane Johns in 1892, which lasted until her death in 1906. He married Adelaide Isabel Hyde (1885–1971) in 1909.

=== Children ===
Two of his sons from his first marriage, Bert Rankin (1893–1971) and Cliff Rankin (1896–1975), were captains of the Geelong Football Club (1925–1927 and 1923 respectively); and both were selected to play for Victoria in 1923.

A son from his second marriage, Doug Rankin (1915–1987), also had a brief but successful career with the club, playing just nine senior games in two seasons (1938–1939).

=== Grandchildren and great-grandchildren ===
The O'Donnells

Eileen O'Donnell (née Rankin) was the daughter of Teddy and Adelaide Rankin and the sister of Bert, Cliff and Doug Rankin. In April 1937, Eileen married Leo O'Donnell, and they moved into Anderson Street, East Geelong. Eileen and Leo had two sons, Ian and Graeme O'Donnell. Graeme played for Geelong and North Melbourne during 1960s. He was also the father of both Gary O'Donnell and Shelley O'Donnell. Gary played for Essendon between 1987 and 1998 and Shelley is a former Australia netball international.

Georgie Rankin

Georgie Rankin, an AFL Women's player with Geelong is the great-granddaughter of Teddy Rankin.

== Football ==
Described as a skilful rover, who ran with a stoop, and was noted for his football nous, accurate kicking and stamina, Rankin was recruited from the Riversdale Football Club in the Geelong and District Football Association (GDFA) by the Geelong VFA team in 1891.

He played his first match for Geelong's senior team was against South Melbourne on 27 June 1891, when he replaced injured wingman Charlie Wheatland in the selected side. He was one of Geelong's best players.

After 88 games in the VFA, Rankin was a member of the inaugural Geelong VFL side that played Essendon on Saturday, 8 May 1897. His career spanned 20 seasons of football for Geelong, and during the VFL part of it (1897, 1899–1910), he played 180 games, being captain for 15. He missed the 1898 season due to typhoid, but returned to the side in the next year and appeared in every season until his retirement, though by then in the backline.

Rankin retired during the 1910 season at the age of 38, with his career total of 268 games remaining a club record until it was broken by John "Sam" Newman in Round 4 of 1979. At the time, Rankin's 268 games was also second in elite Victorian football behind his longtime Geelong teammate Peter Burns (305 games, 216 in the VFA and 89 in the VFL), and fourth in elite Australian rules football behind the South Australian Jack "Dinny" Reedman (319 games), David "Dolly" Christy (317, 132 in the VFA and 185 in the WAFL, would pass Reedman later that year and retire during 1912 with 345 games), and Burns.

Rankin represented Victoria three times, and in 1903, won the Geelong Best and Fairest award, as well as becoming the first Geelong player to reach 100 VFL games in the Second Semi-Final.

During his prime, Rankin declined offers to transfer to a number of other clubs. He was an advocate of amateurism, arguing against the emerging practice of player payments.

=== 1899 team of "champions" ===
At the end of the 1899 season, in the process of naming his own "champion player", the football correspondent for The Argus, Reginald Wilmot ("Old Boy"), selected a team of the best players of the 1899 VFL competition:

- Backs: Maurie Collins (Essendon), Bill Proudfoot (Collingwood), Peter Burns (Geelong).
- Halfbacks: Pat Hickey (Fitzroy), George Davidson (South Melbourne), Alf Wood (Melbourne).
- Centres: Fred Leach (Collingwood), Firth McCallum (Geelong), Harry Wright (Essendon).
- Wings: Charlie Pannam (Collingwood), Eddie Drohan (Fitzroy), Herb Howson (South Melbourne).
- Forwards: Bill Jackson (Essendon), Eddy James (Geelong), Charlie Colgan (South Melbourne).
- Ruck: Mick Pleass (South Melbourne), Frank Hailwood (Collingwood), Joe McShane (Geelong).
- Rovers: Dick Condon (Collingwood), Bill McSpeerin (Fitzroy), Teddy Rankin (Geelong).

From those he considered to be the three best players — that is, Condon, Hickey, and Pleass — Wilmot selected Pat Hickey as his "champion player" of the season.

== Touching the ball on the ground ==
Many credit Rankin with being the first player in the league to touch the ball on the ground, rather than bouncing it.

Although many modern accounts situate the event in the 1890s, it seems certain that, on the (1925) account of Gerald Brosnan, a former Geelong (VFA) team-mate or Rankin, it happened during the time that Brosnan was playing for Fitzroy (viz., 1900–1909), that it happened at the Brunswick Street Oval, that it took place on an extremely wet day (the playing conditions on the Brunswick Street Oval were notoriously bad on wet days due to the slush and mud that ran from one end of the ground to the other), and that Jim D'Helin was the umpire:

By the way, Ted was instrumental in having the clause regarding wet day bouncing inserted in the rules. Playing against us at Fitzroy on a very wet day, when it was impossible to bounce the ball, Ted conceived the brilliant idea of running 10 yards, stooping down and touching the ground with the ball, and going on. He got only the first 10 yards, however, for [James Otto] Jimmy D'Helin, who, I think, was the umpire, free-kicked him, though undoubtedly he was wrong in doing so. I'll never forget Ted's look when he found himself penalised for his clever idea. (The Geelong Advertiser, 16 October 1925)

== After football ==
After football, Rankin was caretaker at the Corio Oval for about eight years, until he was replaced by Arthur Rayson c.1924.

He was employed as the head groundsman at the Geelong College from 1904 to 1941, and as the Principal's gardener from 1941 to 1944. He also coached the college's First XVIII from 1905 to 1921.

== Death ==
He died, in a private Geelong hospital, on 31 July 1944.

== Honours ==
- A set of memorial gates (the Edwin Rankin Memorial Gates) were erected in his honour at Geelong College in 1953.
- In 2018, the Geelong Football Club awarded Rankin the status of "Club Legend", the twenty-fifth former player to be so honoured.

== See also ==
- Rankin family of Geelong
