= Eddy James =

Australian rules footballer (1874–1937)

Personal information
- Full name: Edwin Ernest James
- Born: 14 February 1874; Bendigo
- Died: 16 September 1937 (aged 63); Casterton, Victoria
- Original team: Geelong Grammar
- Height: 193 cm (6 ft 4 in)
- Weight: 96 kg (212 lb)

Playing career^{1}
Years	Club	Games (Goals)
1889, 1892–1896	Geelong (VFA)	68 (64)
1897–1900	Geelong	46 (85)
Total		114 (149)
- ^{1} Playing statistics correct to the end of 1900.

Edwin Ernest James (14 February 1874 – 16 September 1937) was an Australian rules footballer who played for Geelong in the years before and following the formation of the VFL.

== Football ==
James started his career as a backman, playing a game at 15 after Geelong were short for players.

He moved to the forward line in his return in 1892, and in 1895 finished with 24 goals to be equal third in the VFA goalkicking.

In the inaugural VFL season in 1897, he kicked 22 goals in the home-and-away season to share the Leading Goalkicker Award with Jack Leith; incidentally, this is the lowest number of goals to have ever earned this award, and will likely hold this record in perpetuity due to the high-scoring nature of the modern game. His end-of-year tally of 27 goals (including finals) was also the most in the league for that year. He kicked a career-high seven goals in game against St Kilda in 1898.

He again topped the VFL's goalkicking in 1899 with 31 goals, and he was rewarded with selection for Victoria in an interstate match against South Australia. James also has the dubious distinction of setting the all-time record for the most behinds kicked by a player in a game during this season, with an individual score of 5 goals and 16 behinds against St Kilda.

A knee injury ended his career prematurely in 1900.

=== 1899 team of "champions" ===
At the end of the 1899 season, in the process of naming his own "champion player", the football correspondent for The Argus, Reginald Wilmot ("Old Boy"), selected a team of the best players of the 1899 VFL competition:

- Backs: Maurie Collins (Essendon), Bill Proudfoot (Collingwood), Peter Burns (Geelong).
- Halfbacks: Pat Hickey (Fitzroy), George Davidson (South Melbourne), Alf Wood (Melbourne).
- Centres: Fred Leach (Collingwood), Firth McCallum (Geelong), Harry Wright (Essendon).
- Wings: Charlie Pannam (Collingwood), Eddie Drohan (Fitzroy), Herb Howson (South Melbourne).
- Forwards: Bill Jackson (Essendon), Eddy James (Geelong), Charlie Colgan (South Melbourne).
- Ruck: Mick Pleass (South Melbourne), Frank Hailwood (Collingwood), Joe McShane (Geelong).
- Rovers: Dick Condon (Collingwood), Bill McSpeerin (Fitzroy), Teddy Rankin (Geelong).

From those he considered to be the three best players — that is, Condon, Hickey, and Pleass — Wilmot selected Pat Hickey as his "champion player" of the season.

== Death ==
After his football career, he moved to Casterton, where he worked as a motor mechanic, and he died there in 1937.

== See also ==
- The Footballers' Alphabet
