= George Davidson (footballer) =

Australian rules footballer (1872–1945)

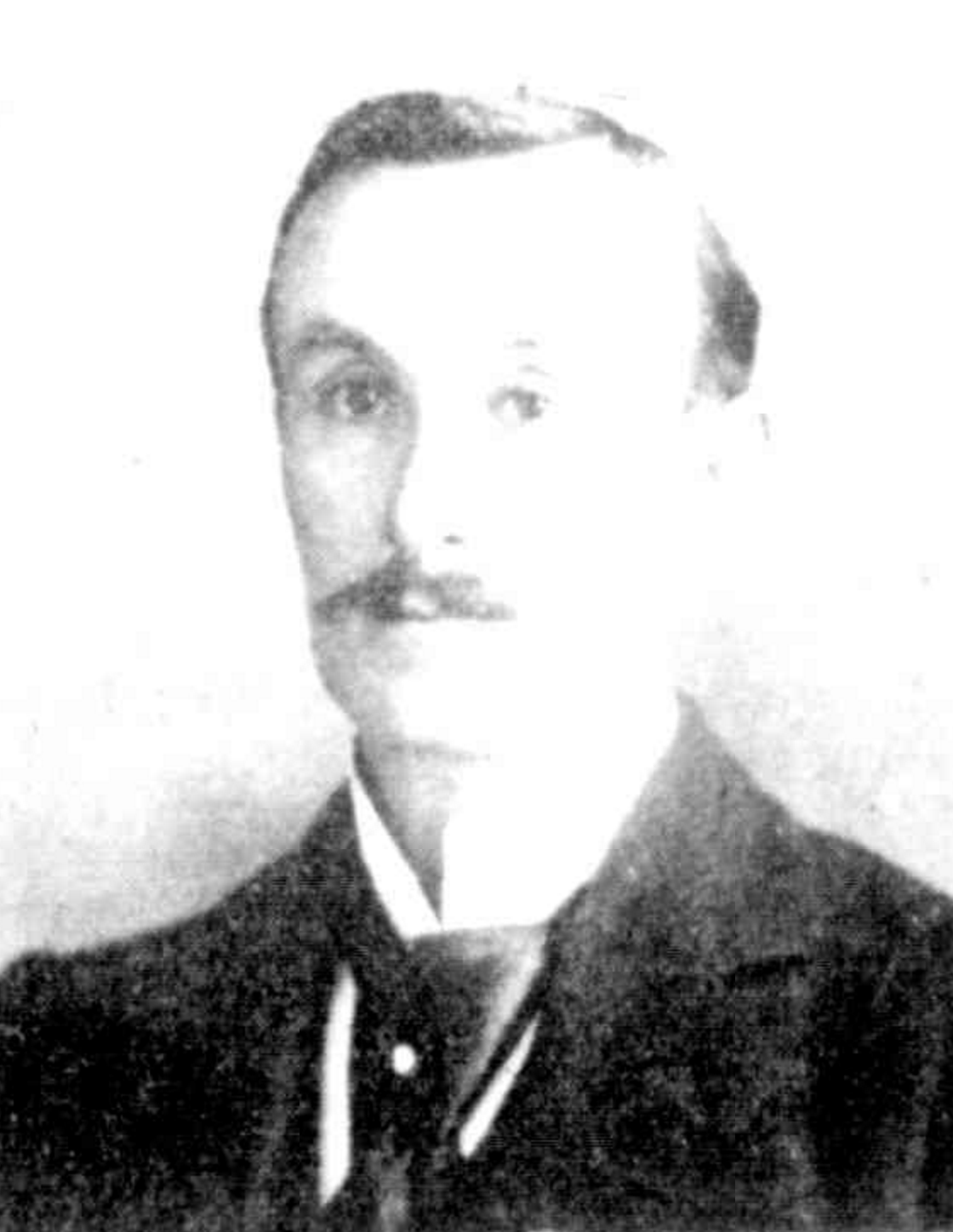
- Davidson in 1899

Personal information
- Full name: George Davidson
- Born: 13 June 1872; Bealiba, Victoria
- Died: 25 August 1945 (aged 73); Corryong, Victoria

Playing career^{1}
Years	Club	Games (Goals)
1897–1900	South Melbourne	37 (0)
- ^{1} Playing statistics correct to the end of 1900.

George Davidson (13 June 1872 – 25 August 1945) was an Australian rules footballer who played with Collingwood in the Victorian Football Association and South Melbourne in the Victorian Football League (VFL). His football career ended prematurely when he broke his leg in 1900.

== Family ==
The eighth of the ten children of David Davidson (1824–1895), and Hellen Davidson (1828–1887), née Forrest, George Davidson was born at Bealiba, Victoria, on 13 June 1872.

He married Alice Margaret Graves (1879–1962), at Rutherglen, Victoria, on 25 October 1904. They had four children.

== Football ==
=== Collingwood (VFA) ===
Recruited from Mission Ramblers in 1894, he played in 13 games (kicked 2 goals) for Collingwood in the VFA over the team's last three seasons in the VFA competition (1894-1896).

=== South Melbourne (VFL) ===
He played his first match for South Melbourne, against Geelong, at the Lake Oval on 24 July 1897.

In his second-last match, playing on the half-back flank, he was one of the best players in the South Melbourne 1899 Grand Final team that lost to Fitzroy by one point: 3.8 (26) to 3.9 (27).

In the final quarter of his last match for South Melbourne, against Essendon on 5 May 1900 — he had been appointed the team's captain for the 1900 season — he fell and broke his leg. He did not play VFL football again.

=== 1899 team of "champions" ===
At the end of the 1899 season, in the process of naming his own "champion player", the football correspondent for The Argus, Reginald Wilmot ("Old Boy"), selected a team of the best players of the 1899 VFL competition:

- Backs: Maurie Collins (Essendon), Bill Proudfoot (Collingwood), Peter Burns (Geelong).
- Halfbacks: Pat Hickey (Fitzroy), George Davidson (South Melbourne), Alf Wood (Melbourne).
- Centres: Fred Leach (Collingwood), Firth McCallum (Geelong), Harry Wright (Essendon).
- Wings: Charlie Pannam (Collingwood), Eddie Drohan (Fitzroy), Herb Howson (South Melbourne).
- Forwards: Bill Jackson (Essendon), Eddy James (Geelong), Charlie Colgan (South Melbourne).
- Ruck: Mick Pleass (South Melbourne), Frank Hailwood (Collingwood), Joe McShane (Geelong).
- Rovers: Dick Condon (Collingwood), Bill McSpeerin (Fitzroy), Teddy Rankin (Geelong).

From those he considered to be the three best players — that is, Condon, Hickey, and Pleass — Wilmot selected Pat Hickey as his "champion player" of the season.

== Death ==
He died (suddenly) at Corryong, Victoria on 25 August 1945.
