= Firth McCallum =

Australian rules footballer (1872–1910)

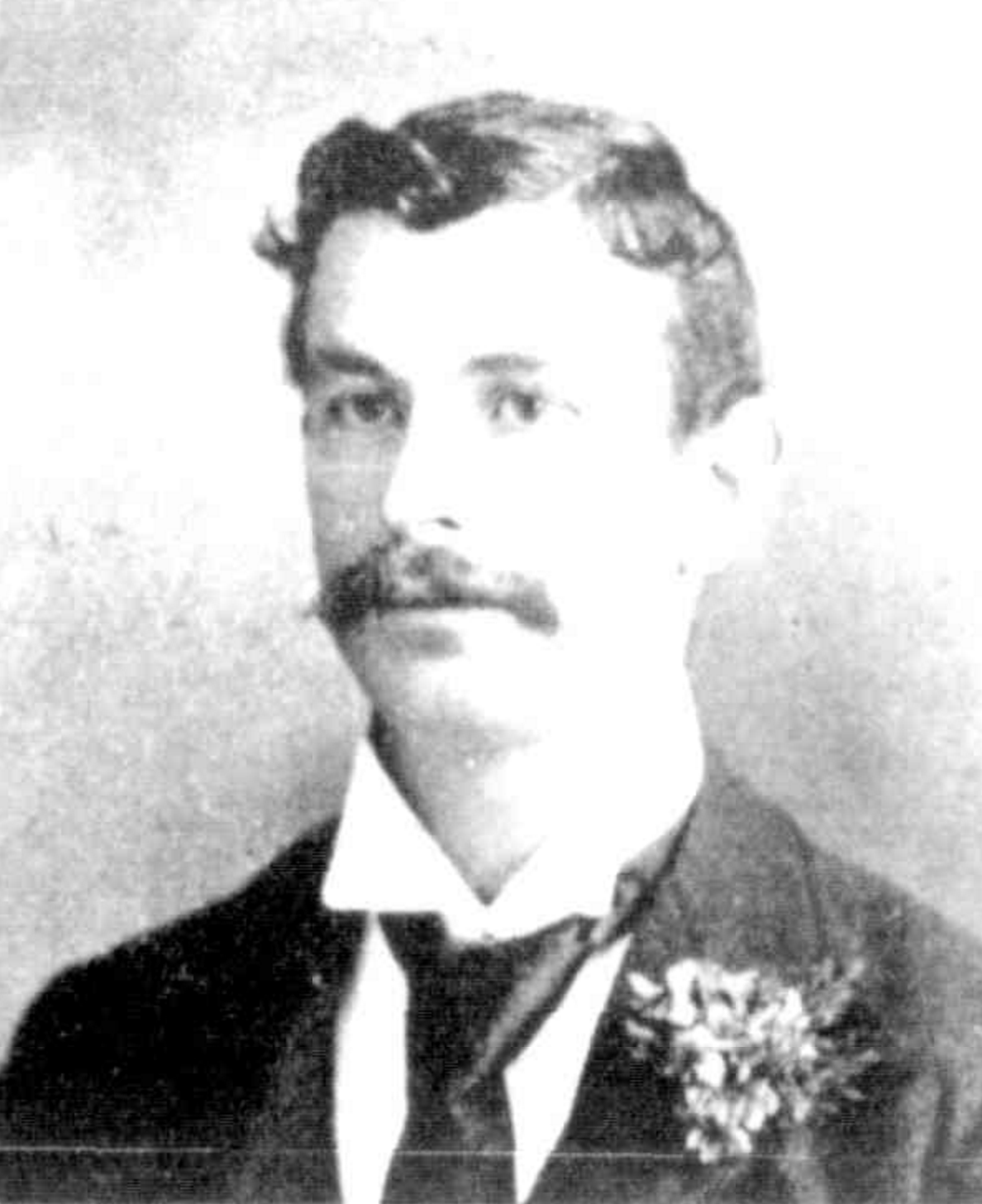
- McCallum in 1899

Personal information
- Full name: Firth William McCallum
- Born: 27 December 1872; Birregurra, Victoria
- Died: 11 July 1910 (aged 37); Birregurra, Victoria
- Original team: Birregurra
- Position: Centre / Half-forward

Playing career^{1}
Years	Club	Games (Goals)
1893-1896	Geelong (VFA)	57 (0)
1897–1903, 1905	Geelong (VFL)	74 (25)
Total		131 (25)
- ^{1} Playing statistics correct to the end of 1905.

Firth William McCallum (27 December 1872 – 11 July 1910) was an Australian rules footballer who played with Geelong in both the Victorian Football Association (VFA) and the Victorian Football League (VFL).

== Family ==
The son of James McCallum (1844-1888), and Ann Whitely McCallum (1843–1928), née Leake, later, Mrs. Richard West Beach, Firth William McCallum was born at Birregurra, Victoria on 27 December 1872.

He married Jeanetta Gilmore "Nettie" Douglas (1877–1949), at Geelong, on 22 April 1903; they had three children.

== Football ==
=== Geelong (VFA) ===
Recruited by the VFA club, Geelong, from the Birregurra Football Club, he played in 12 matches for the team in 1893, 13 matches in 1894, 17 matches in 1895, and 15 matches in 1896.

==== Inter-colonial representative team ====
On 21 July 1894 he and his Geelong team-mate, Joe Marmo, played on the wing for the VFA in an inter-colonial match, against South Australia, on the MCG.

=== Geelong (VFL) ===
He played for Geelong in its first-ever match in the new VFL competition, against Essendon, at the Corio Oval, on 8 May 1897.

=== 1899 team of "champions" ===
At the end of the 1899 season, in the process of naming his own "champion player", the football correspondent for The Argus, Reginald Wilmot ("Old Boy"), selected a team of the best players of the 1899 VFL competition:

- Backs: Maurie Collins (Essendon), Bill Proudfoot (Collingwood), Peter Burns (Geelong).
- Halfbacks: Pat Hickey (Fitzroy), George Davidson (South Melbourne), Alf Wood (Melbourne).
- Centres: Fred Leach (Collingwood), Firth McCallum (Geelong), Harry Wright (Essendon).
- Wings: Charlie Pannam (Collingwood), Eddie Drohan (Fitzroy), Herb Howson (South Melbourne).
- Forwards: Bill Jackson (Essendon), Eddy James (Geelong), Charlie Colgan (South Melbourne).
- Ruck: Mick Pleass (South Melbourne), Frank Hailwood (Collingwood), Joe McShane (Geelong).
- Rovers: Dick Condon (Collingwood), Bill McSpeerin (Fitzroy), Teddy Rankin (Geelong).

From those he considered to be the three best players — that is, Condon, Hickey, and Pleass — Wilmot selected Pat Hickey as his "champion player" of the season.

== Death ==
McCallum, who had been suffering from consumption, died at Birregurra, Victoria on 11 July 1910, and was buried at the Warncoort Cemetery on 13 July 1910.
