= Joe McShane =

Australian rules footballer (1868–1950)

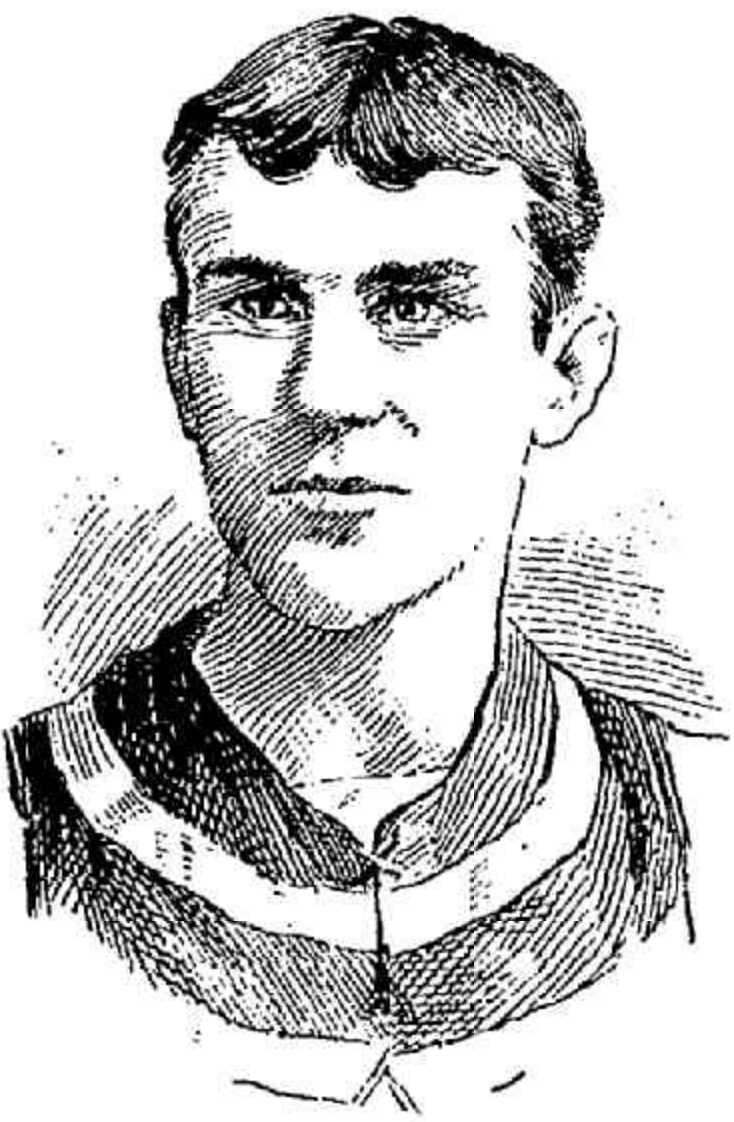
- An illustration of McShane from 1890

Personal information
- Full name: Joseph Francis McShane
- Born: 29 November 1868; Geelong
- Died: 26 July 1950 (aged 81); Caritas Christi Hospice, Kew, Victoria
- Height: 183 cm (6 ft 0 in)
- Weight: 80 kg (176 lb)
- Position: Ruckman

Playing career^{1}
Years	Club	Games (Goals)
1887–1896	Geelong (VFA)	135 (43)
1897–1901	Geelong	75 (30)
1902–1904	Carlton	48 (17)
Total		258 (90)
- ^{1} Playing statistics correct to the end of 1904.

Joseph Francis McShane (29 November 1868 – 26 July 1950) was an Australian rules footballer who played for the Geelong Football Club and the Carlton Football Club between 1887 and 1904.

== Family ==
The son of Philip McShane (1835-1908), and Mary Ann McShane (1836-1912), née McCabe, Joseph Francis McShane was born at Geelong on 29 November 1868. His brothers Henry and Jim also played with Geelong, and later at Carlton.

He married Joanna Ryan (1862-1932), at Melbourne, on 5 July 1882.

== Football ==
=== Geelong (VFA/VFL) ===
One of the six McShane brothers who played in the VFA or VFL (or both) for Geelong, McShane started his career at Geelong in the Victorian Football Association (VFA) in 1887, and played 210 games for the club (135 in the VFA and 75 in the VFL), becoming the first Geelong player to play 200 games for the club before moving to Carlton in 1902.

==== 1899 ====
At the end of the 1899 season, in the process of naming his own "champion player", the football correspondent for The Argus ("Old Boy"), selected a team of the best players of the 1899 VFL competition:

Backs: Maurie Collins (Essendon), Bill Proudfoot (Collingwood), Peter Burns (Geelong)
Halfbacks: Pat Hickey (Fitzroy), George Davidson (South Melbourne), Alf Wood (Melbourne)
Centres: Fred Leach (Collingwood), Firth McCallum (Geelong), Harry Wright (Essendon)
Wings: Charlie Pannam (Collingwood), Eddie Drohan (Fitzroy), Herb Howson (South Melbourne)
Forwards: Bill Jackson (Essendon), Eddy James (Geelong), Charlie Colgan (South Melbourne)
Ruck: Mick Pleass (South Melbourne), Frank Hailwood (Collingwood), Joe McShane (Geelong)
Rovers: Dick Condon (Collingwood), Bill McSpeerin (Fitzroy), Teddy Rankin (Geelong).

From those he considered to be the three best players — that is, Condon, Hickey, and Pleass — he selected Pat Hickey as his "champion player" of the season.

=== Carlton (VFL) ===
McShane retired following the 1904 Grand Final against Fitzroy: at the time, his career total of 258 games was second in elite Victorian football behind his longtime Geelong teammate Peter Burns (305 games, 216 in the VFA and 89 in the VFL), and third in elite Australian rules football behind Burns and the South Australian Jack "Dinny" Reedman (281 games, who would retire at the end of 1909 with 319 games).

== Death ==
He died at the Caritas Christi Hospice, in Kew, Victoria on 26 July 1950.
