= Fred Fontaine =

Australian rules footballer

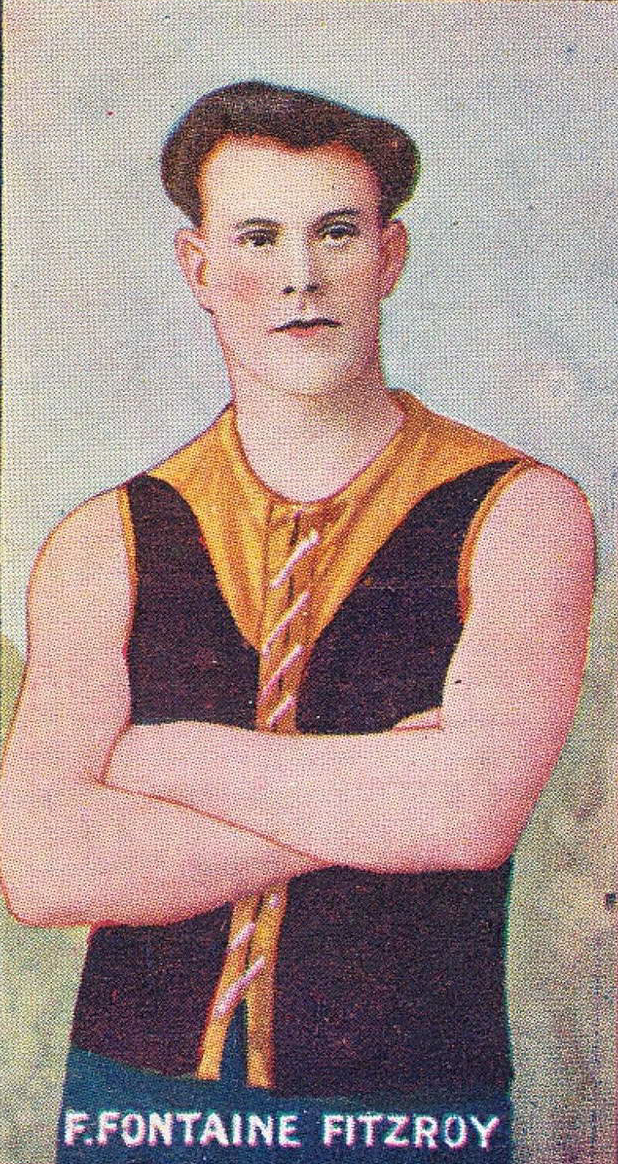
- Cigarette card of Fontaine in 1907

Personal information
- Full name: Frederick Ernest De La Fontaine
- Born: 30 January 1878; Richmond, Victoria
- Died: 9 December 1957 (aged 79); Thornbury, Victoria

Playing career^{1}
Years	Club	Games (Goals)
1898–1907	Fitzroy	110 (33)
- ^{1} Playing statistics correct to the end of 1907.

Career highlights
- 4× VFL premiership player: 1898, 1899, 1904, 1905

Frederick Ernest De La Fontaine (30 January 1878 - 9 December 1957) was an Australian rules footballer who played for the Fitzroy Football Club in the Victorian Football League (VFL).

Fontaine played in a variety of positions during his career and was a member of a very successful Fitzroy side, winning four grand finals and losing two. Of the four premierships his most notable performance came in the 1904 decider where he played at full back and set up the winning goal to Percy Trotter after making a run from defence.
