= Mick Pleass =

Australian rules footballer (1874–1925)

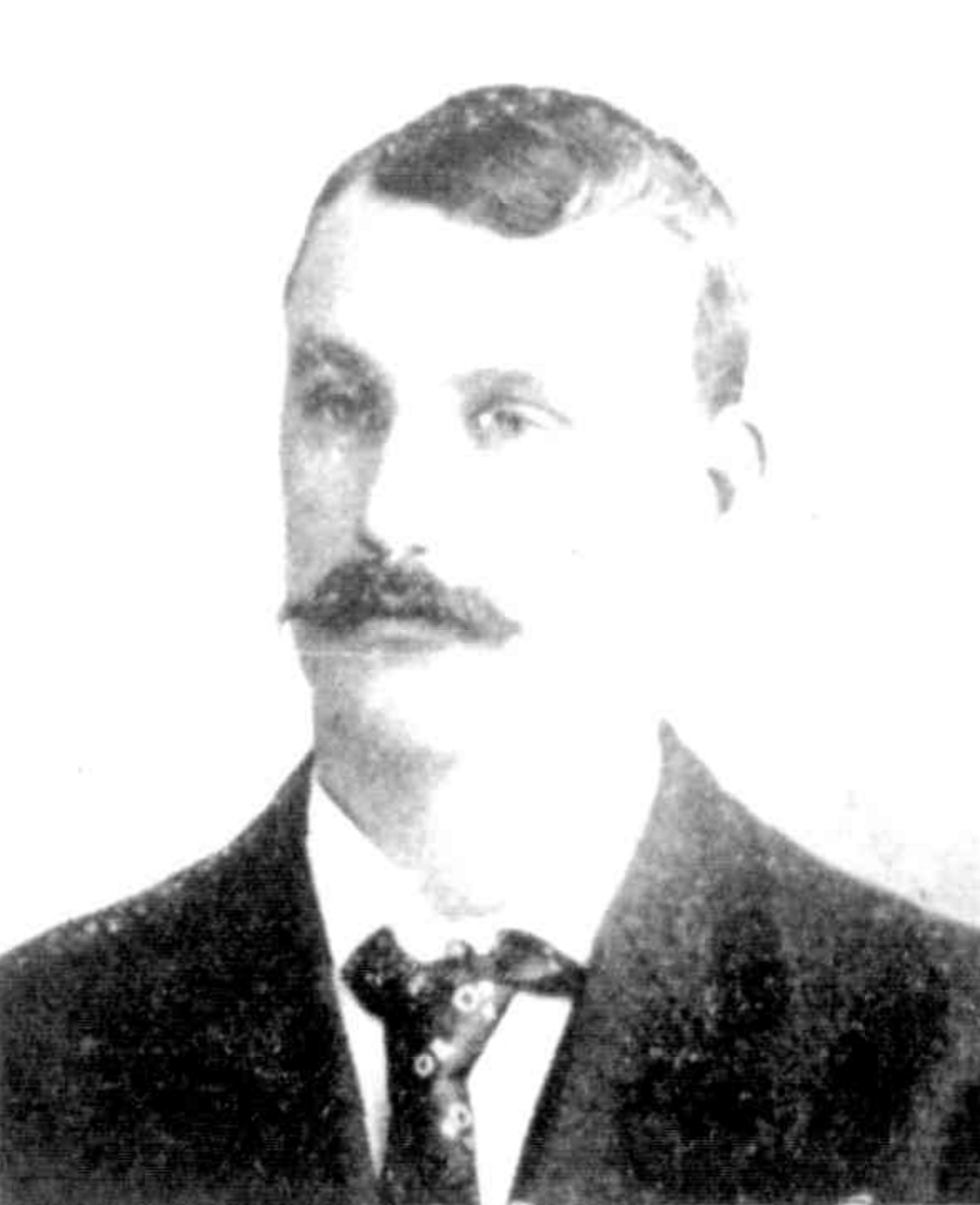
- Pleass in 1899

Personal information
- Full name: George Victor Pleass
- Born: 12 November 1874; Kent Town, South Australia
- Died: 27 August 1925 (aged 50); Boulder, Western Australia
- Original team: South Melbourne (VFA)
- Position: Follower

Playing career^{1}
| Years | Club | Games (Goals) |
| 1896 | South Melbourne (VFA) | 19 (4) |
| 1897–1904 | South Melbourne (VFL) | 109 (41) |
| 1904 | Essendon | 4 (0) |
| Total | | 132 (45) |
- ^{1} Playing statistics correct to the end of 1904.

George Victor "Mick" Pleass (12 November 1874 – 27 August 1925) was an Australian rules footballer who played with South Melbourne and Essendon in the VFA and Victorian Football League (VFL).

== Football ==
Pleass was a follower and played his early football at South Melbourne when they were in the Victorian Football Association (VFA).

He participated in their inaugural VFL match and remained with the club until 1904 when he crossed to Essendon, after his transfer to play for Boulder in the Western Australian Goldfields was refused. During his career he represented Victoria at interstate football on three occasions.

A ruckman, Pleass briefly gave the game away in 1902 to become a field umpire but returned to South Melbourne after officiating in a couple of games.

=== 1899 team of "champions" ===
At the end of the 1899 season, in the process of naming his own "champion player", the football correspondent for The Argus, Reginald Wilmot ("Old Boy"), selected a team of the best players of the 1899 VFL competition:

- Backs: Maurie Collins (Essendon), Bill Proudfoot (Collingwood), Peter Burns (Geelong).
- Halfbacks: Pat Hickey (Fitzroy), George Davidson (South Melbourne), Alf Wood (Melbourne).
- Centres: Fred Leach (Collingwood), Firth McCallum (Geelong), Harry Wright (Essendon).
- Wings: Charlie Pannam (Collingwood), Eddie Drohan (Fitzroy), Herb Howson (South Melbourne).
- Forwards: Bill Jackson (Essendon), Eddy James (Geelong), Charlie Colgan (South Melbourne).
- Ruck: Mick Pleass (South Melbourne), Frank Hailwood (Collingwood), Joe McShane (Geelong).
- Rovers: Dick Condon (Collingwood), Bill McSpeerin (Fitzroy), Teddy Rankin (Geelong).

From those he considered to be the three best players — that is, Condon, Hickey, and Pleass — Wilmot selected Pat Hickey as his "champion player" of the season.

== Death ==
He died at the Kalgoorlie Government Hospital, in Boulder, Western Australia on 27 August 1925.

== See also ==
- The Footballers' Alphabet
