= Frank Hailwood =

Australian rules footballer (1873–1944)

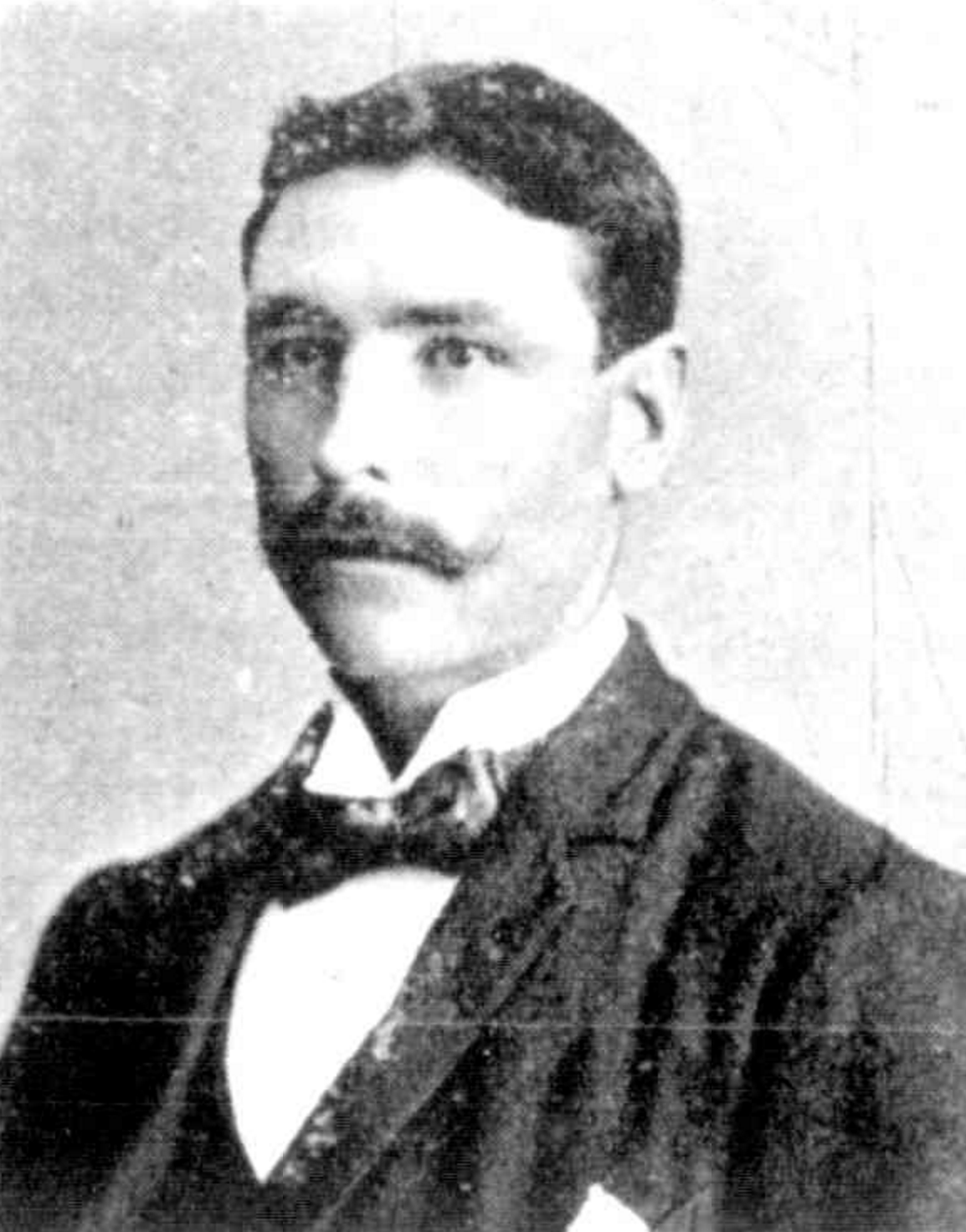
- Hailwood in 1899

Personal information
- Full name: Francis Hailwood
- Nickname: Charger
- Born: 3 April 1873; Alexandra, Victoria
- Died: 21 May 1944 (aged 71); Carlton, Victoria
- Original team: Collingwood Juniors
- Position: Ruckman

Playing career^{1}
| Years | Club | Games (Goals) |
| 1894–1896 | Collingwood (VFA) | 46 (17) |
| 1897–1904 | Collingwood | 104 (37) |
- ^{1} Playing statistics correct to the end of 1904.

Career highlights
- VFL premiership player: 1902

Frank Hailwood (3 April 1873 – 21 May 1944) was an Australian rules footballer who played for the Collingwood Football Club in the Victorian Football League (VFL).

== Family ==
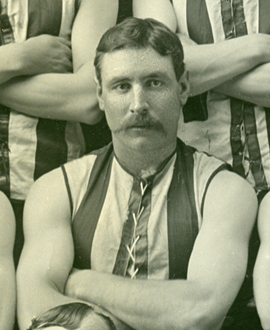
Frank Hailwood in 1901

One of the eight children of Joseph Hailwood (1834–1912), and Ellen Hailwood (1839-1916), née Connor, Francis Hailwood was born at Alexandra, Victoria on 3 April 1873.

His brother, John Hailwood (1870-1917), was killed in action while serving with the First AIF in Belgium on 4 October 1917.

== Football ==
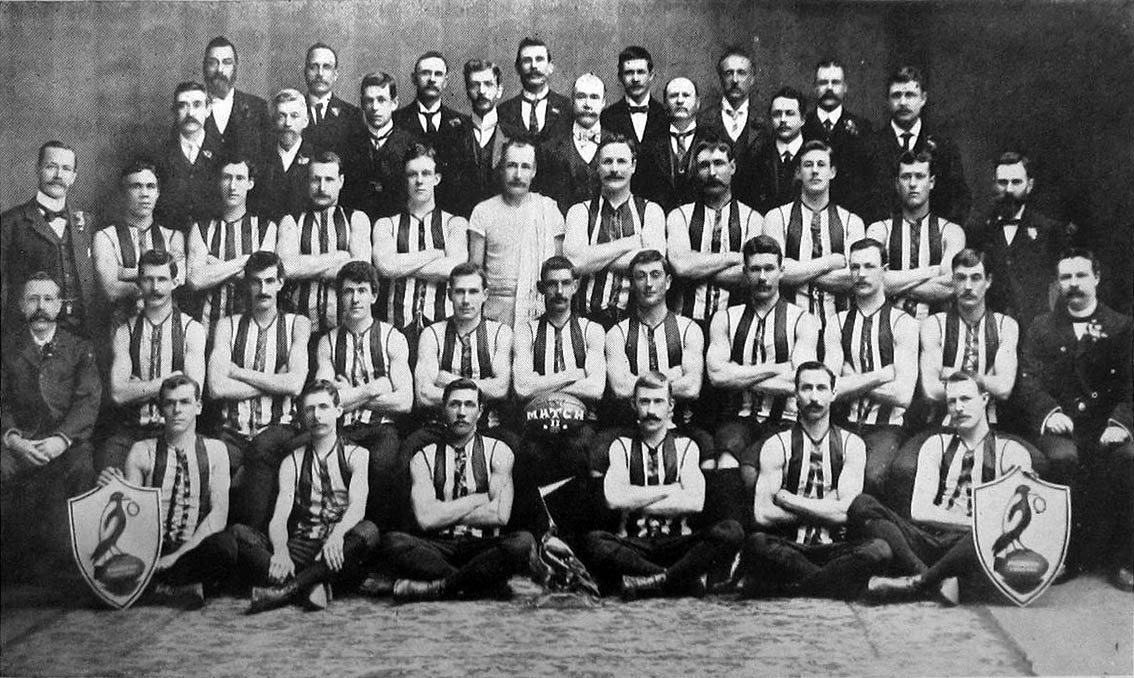
Collingwood: 1902 Premiership Team

=== Collingwood (VFA) ===
Recruited from Collingwood Juniors.

=== Collingwood (VFL) ===
Hailwood was Collingwood's ruckman during seven seasons in eight years for Collingwood in the VFL. Hailwood played 150 games for Collingwood, including the 1902 Grand Final win over Essendon.

==== "Old Boy's" Champion Player of 1899 ====
At the end of the 1899 season, in the process of naming his own "champion player", the football correspondent for The Argus ("Old Boy"), selected a team of the best players of the 1899 VFL competition:

- Backs: Maurie Collins (Essendon), Bill Proudfoot (Collingwood), Peter Burns (Geelong)
- Halfbacks: Pat Hickey (Fitzroy), George Davidson (South Melbourne), Alf Wood (Melbourne)
- Centres: Fred Leach (Collingwood), Firth McCallum (Geelong), Harry Wright (Essendon)
- Wings: Charlie Pannam (Collingwood), Eddie Drohan (Fitzroy), Herb Howson (South Melbourne)
- Forwards: Bill Jackson (Essendon), Eddy James (Geelong), Charlie Colgan (South Melbourne)
- Ruck: Mick Pleass (South Melbourne), Frank Hailwood (Collingwood), Joe McShane (Geelong)
- Rovers: Dick Condon (Collingwood), Bill McSpeerin (Fitzroy), Teddy Rankin (Geelong).

From those he considered to be the three best players — that is, Condon, Hickey, and Pleass — "Old Boy" selected Pat Hickey as his "champion player" of the season.

=== Boulder City (GFA) ===
On 22 April 1903 he was cleared from Collingwood to the Boulder City Football Club in the West Australian Goldfields Football Association (GFA).

=== Collingwood (VFL) ===
Although he was cleared from Collingwood Football Club to the Collingwood Juniors in July 1904, he was reinstated in the senior team, playing in the last four of the last five home-and-away matches of the 1904 season, and in the 10 September 1904 Semi-Final team that lost to Fitzroy 7.8 (50) to 9.7 (61).

=== Subiaco (WAFA) ===
On 30 May 1906 he was cleared from Collingwood to the Subiaco Football Club in the West Australian Football Association (WAFA).

== Death ==
He died at his residence in Carlton, Victoria on 21 May 1944.
