= Henri Jeanneret =

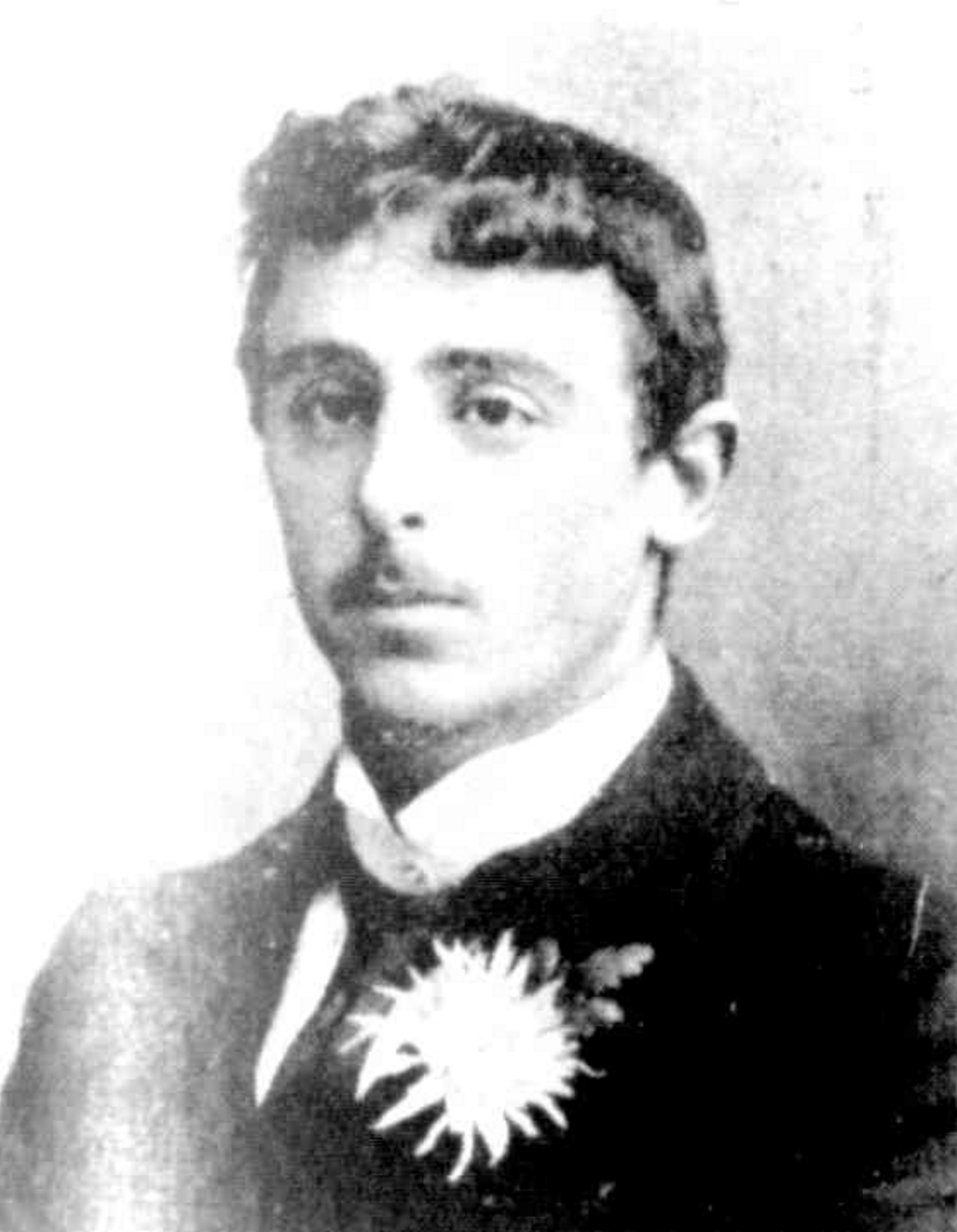
- Jeanneret in 1899

Personal information
- Full name: Henri Edward Jeanneret
- Born: 1 January 1878; Switzerland
- Died: 1 June 1935 (aged 57); Hurstville, New South Wales
- Height: 178 cm (5 ft 10 in)
- Weight: 75 kg (165 lb)
- Positions: Wing, forward

Playing career^{1}
| Years | Club | Games (Goals) |
| 1898–1903 | South Melbourne | 75 (12) |
| 1904 | Melbourne | 4 (0) |
| Total | | 79 (12) |
- ^{1} Playing statistics correct to the end of 1904.

Henri Edward Jeanneret (1 January 1878 – 1 June 1935) was a Swiss-born Australian rules footballer who played in the Victorian Football League (VFL).

== Family ==
The fourth (of seven) child of Frederic Guillaume Jeanneret Gris (1851-1893), and Laure Jeanneret Gris (1851-1923), née Belrichard, Henri Edward Jeanneret was born in Switzerland on 1 January 1878. His family arrived in Melbourne in the S.S. Somersetshire on 10 August 1879.

He married Jane/Jean Ethel Domville Scott (1881-) in 1906. He was naturalized, as "Henry Edward Jeanneret" on 17 August 1911 (cert. No. 12104).

== Playing career ==
"A young man named Henry Jeanneret sustained a fracture of the ribs while playing football [for Mentone] in the Mentone v. East Brighton match last Saturday." — The Caulfield and Elsternwick Leader, 11 July 1896.

=== Glenferrie (SJFA) ===
Jeanneret started playing football with Glenferrie (late Clendon) in the Suburban Junior Football Association in 1897, where he was also the club delegate.

=== Hawthorn (VJFA) ===
When Glenferrie disbanded during 1897, he then joined the Hawthorn club that was competing in the Victorian Junior Football Association,

=== South Melbourne (VFL) ===
He joined South Melbourne at the start of 1898. A wingman, Jeanneret made his debut for South Melbourne in Round 1 of the 1898 VFL season. He played in 75 matches over six seasons for South Melbourne.

=== Melbourne (VFL) ===
On 5 May 1904 he was cleared to Melbourne for the 1904 VFL season. At Melbourne he played four matches.

== See also ==
- 1899 VFL grand final

== Death ==
He died at Hurstville, New South Wales on 1 June 1935.
