= Charlie Colgan =

Australian rules footballer (1878–1935)

Personal information
- Full name: Charles Edward Colgan
- Born: 9 February 1878; Emerald Hill (now known as South Melbourne), Victoria
- Died: 25 July 1935 (aged 57); South Melbourne, Victoria
- Original team: South Park

Playing career^{1}
Years	Club	Games (Goals)
1898–1901	South Melbourne	37 (43)
- ^{1} Playing statistics correct to the end of 1901.

Career highlights
- 2x South Melbourne leading goalkicker: (1898, 1899)

Charles Edward Colgan (9 February 1878 – 25 July 1935) was an Australian rules footballer who played with South Melbourne in the Victorian Football League (VFL).

== Family ==
The youngest of the seven children of the tailor Patrick Colgan (1833–1911), and Margaret Colgan, née Dwyer (1841–1911), Charles Edward Colgan was born at Emerald Hill (now known as South Melbourne) on 9 February 1878.

He married Mary Veronica Gilchrist (1882–1948) in 1903. They had three children; one of whom, a daughter (Veronica Margaret), died aged 3 months.

== Football ==
External image
- South Melbourne Football Team Colgan is the player standing at the extreme left of the third row.

=== South Melbourne (VFL) ===
Originally with the West Melbourne football club, he was recruited from the local South Park Football Club on the basis of his performance in a (South Park) pre-season match. Colgan made his debut for South Melbourne against Carlton, at Princes Park, on 14 May 1898.

==== 1899 team of "champions" ====
At the end of the 1899 season, in the process of naming his own "champion player", the football correspondent for The Argus, Reginald Wilmot ("Old Boy"), selected a team of the best players of the 1899 VFL competition:

- Backs: Maurie Collins (Essendon), Bill Proudfoot (Collingwood), Peter Burns (Geelong).
- Halfbacks: Pat Hickey (Fitzroy), George Davidson (South Melbourne), Alf Wood (Melbourne).
- Centres: Fred Leach (Collingwood), Firth McCallum (Geelong), Harry Wright (Essendon).
- Wings: Charlie Pannam (Collingwood), Eddie Drohan (Fitzroy), Herb Howson (South Melbourne).
- Forwards: Bill Jackson (Essendon), Eddy James (Geelong), Charlie Colgan (South Melbourne).
- Ruck: Mick Pleass (South Melbourne), Frank Hailwood (Collingwood), Joe McShane (Geelong).
- Rovers: Dick Condon (Collingwood), Bill McSpeerin (Fitzroy), Teddy Rankin (Geelong).

From those he considered to be the three best players — that is, Condon, Hickey, and Pleass — Wilmot selected Pat Hickey as his "champion player" of the season.

=== South Melbourne Juniors (VJFA) ===
In May 1901, he was cleared from South Melbourne to South Melbourne Juniors in the Victorian Junior Football Association. He played with the Juniors for five seasons, and in 1905 he was selected (as vice-captain) in a combined VJFA team to play against a combined Ballarat Juniors team.

== Death ==
He died of pneumonia at his residence in South Melbourne on 25 July 1935.
