= Harry Wright (Australian footballer) =

Australian rules footballer and cricketer

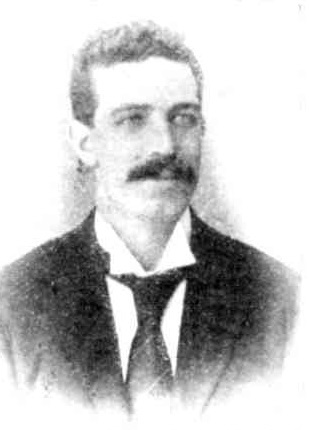
- Wright in 1901

Personal information
- Full name: Herbert Lovegrove Wright
- Nickname: Pimp
- Born: 13 April 1870; Ballarat East, Victoria, Australia
- Died: 19 March 1950 (aged 79); West Melbourne, Victoria, Australia
- Original team: Ballarat Imperials
- Debut: Round 1, 1894, Essendon (VFA) vs. Fitzroy (VFA), at Brunswick Street Oval

Playing career^{1}
Years	Club	Games (Goals)
1894–1896	Essendon (VFA)	48 (20)
1897–1903	Essendon (VFL)	87 (6)
Total		135 (26)
- ^{1} Playing statistics correct to the end of 1903.

Career highlights
- VFA premiership player 1894; 2× VFL premiership player: 1897, 1901

Herbert Lovegrove Wright (13 April 1870 – 19 March 1950) was an Australian rules footballer who played for the Essendon Football Club in the Victorian Football Association (VFA) and in the Victorian Football League (VFL) following its formation in 1897.

== Family ==
The son of William Wright (1828-1878), and Louisa Sarah Wright (1832-1908), née Pennell, Herbert Lovegrove Wright was born at Ballarat East, Victoria, on 13 April 1870.

== Football ==
Wright was extremely agile; in 1894, "Observer", the football correspondent for The Argus, noted that, among the "clever gymnasts" in the Essendon team, "Wright their forward player, can kick a boxing-glove out of a man's hand, the holder standing on a chair, and holding it higher than his own head."

=== Essendon (VFA) ===
Recruited from the Ballarat Imperials Football Club in the Ballarat Football Association (BFA), Wright made his debut for the Essendon Football Club in the Victorian Football Association (VFA) in 1894. He was part of the Essendon team that won the premiership that year.

=== Essendon (VFL) ===
He won his second premiership in the 1897 season. During that season, he kicked the winning goal for Essendon in the first round final against Geelong. He also played in the first ever VFL Grand Final the following year. A centreman, Wright finished on the losing team on that occasion but took part in a winning Grand Final in 1901, winning his third premiership.

=== 1899 team of "champions" ===
At the end of the 1899 season, in the process of naming his own "champion player", the football correspondent for The Argus, Reginald Wilmot ("Old Boy"), selected a team of the best players of the 1899 VFL competition:

- Backs: Maurie Collins (Essendon), Bill Proudfoot (Collingwood), Peter Burns (Geelong).
- Halfbacks: Pat Hickey (Fitzroy), George Davidson (South Melbourne), Alf Wood (Melbourne).
- Centres: Fred Leach (Collingwood), Firth McCallum (Geelong), Harry Wright (Essendon).
- Wings: Charlie Pannam (Collingwood), Eddie Drohan (Fitzroy), Herb Howson (South Melbourne).
- Forwards: Bill Jackson (Essendon), Eddy James (Geelong), Charlie Colgan (South Melbourne).
- Ruck: Mick Pleass (South Melbourne), Frank Hailwood (Collingwood), Joe McShane (Geelong).
- Rovers: Dick Condon (Collingwood), Bill McSpeerin (Fitzroy), Teddy Rankin (Geelong).

From those he considered to be the three best players — that is, Condon, Hickey, and Pleass — Wilmot selected Pat Hickey as his "champion player" of the season.

== Cricket ==
As a cricketer Wright was a wicket-keeper and one of the three first-class matches that he played was a Sheffield Shield encounter, against South Australia in the 1904/05 season. He finished his career with three catches and five stumpings to go with his 49 runs at 24.50.

== Death ==
He died at his residence at West Melbourne, Victoria on 19 March 1950.

== See also ==
- List of Victoria first-class cricketers
