= Hugh McEwen =

Australian rules footballer

Personal information
- Full name: Hugh Gordon McEwen
- Born: 2 April 1877; Casterton, Victoria
- Died: 7 March 1914 (aged 36); Casterton, Victoria
- Original team: Hamilton/Ormond College
- Position: Defender

Playing career^{1}
Years	Club	Games (Goals)
1897–1901	Fitzroy	32 (0)
- ^{1} Playing statistics correct to the end of 1901.

Career highlights
- VFL premiership player: 1899

Hugh Gordon McEwen (2 April 1877 – 7 March 1914) was an Australian rules footballer who played for the Fitzroy Football Club in the Victorian Football League (VFL).

McEwen, who began at Fitzroy in their debut VFL season, was a defender from Hamilton. He played as a back pocket in his club's 1899 premiership side and was in the same position when they lost the 1900 Grand Final to Melbourne.
