= Norm Crewther =

Australian rules footballer, born 1919

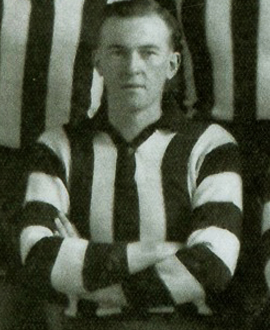
- Crewther during his Collingwood career

Personal information
- Full name: Norm Crewther
- Born: 14 May 1919
- Died: 20 October 2010 (aged 91)
- Original team: South Richmond / East Brunswick
- Height: 183 cm (6 ft 0 in)
- Weight: 79 kg (174 lb)

Playing career^{1}
Years	Club	Games (Goals)
1941–43	Collingwood	14 (5)
- ^{1} Playing statistics correct to the end of 1943.

Norm Crewther (14 May 1919 – 20 October 2010) is a former Australian rules footballer who played with Collingwood in the Victorian Football League (VFL).

He also played for Coburg, South Richmond (VJFL) and East Brunswick Football Clubs.

Norm is the nephew of Collingwood great Bill Proudfoot, and was the oldest living former Collingwood player until his death in 2010.

Norm is the second great uncle of the former Federal Member for Dunkley, Chris Crewther MP.
