= Arthur Robson =

Australian rules footballer

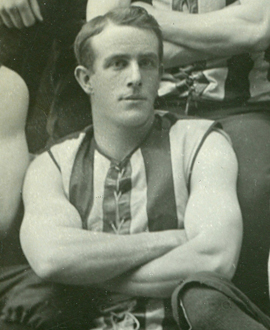
- Robson in 1901

Personal information
- Full name: Arthur Henry Rennison Robson
- Born: 29 March 1878; Richmond, Victoria
- Died: 24 May 1959 (aged 81); Cheltenham, Victoria
- Original team: Collingwood Juniors

Playing career^{1}
Years	Club	Games (Goals)
1900–1901	Collingwood	14 (15)
- ^{1} Playing statistics correct to the end of 1901.

Arthur Robson (29 March 1878 – 24 May 1959) was an Australian rules footballer who played for the Collingwood Football Club in the Victorian Football League (VFL).
