= Henry Elms =

Australian rules footballer and coach

Personal information
- Full name: Henry Elms
- Born: c. 1861
- Died: 14 September 1928 (aged 66–67)

Playing career
| Years | Club | Games (Goals) |
| 1882–1895 | South Melbourne (VFA) | 215 (4) |

Coaching career
| Years | Club | Games (W–L–D) |
| 1918–1919 | South Melbourne | 33 (27–6–0) |

Career highlights
- VFA premiership player 1885, 1888–1890; South Melbourne captain 1885–1894; South Melbourne premiership coach 1918

Henry "Sonny" Elms (c. 1861 – 14 September 1928) was an Australian rules football coach with South Melbourne in the Victorian Football League (VFL).

He had previously played 215 games for the club in the VFA between 1882 and 1895, being part of their premiership teams in 1885 and 1888–1890. Elms was the first player in Victorian elite football to play 200 games, which he achieved in round 20 of 1893, while his career total of 215 games remained a South Melbourne club record until it was broken by teammate Bill Windley in Round 5 of the 1902 VFL season.

He was also South Melbourne captain between 1885, when the club won their second premiership, and 1894. Elms led South Melbourne to four premierships (including a hat-trick in 1888–1890), which as of 2022 remains the Victorian elite football record for most premierships as club captain: this has been equalled in the VFL/AFL by Syd Coventry (in 1930), Dick Reynolds (in 1950), and Michael Tuck (in 1991).

He was made coach in 1918, sharing the duties with former player and longtime teammate Herb Howson. After the club defeated Collingwood by five points in the Grand Final, they became the first (and so far only) pair to coach a premiership team; they remained coaches for the 1919 season, and finished with a coaching record of 27 wins from 33 games.
