= Henry Howson =

Australian rules footballer

Personal information
- Full name: Henry Howson
- Born: 15 July 1877; Jamieson, Victoria
- Died: 15 March 1954 (aged 76); Brighton East, Victoria
- Original team: South St Kilda / South Yarra

Playing career^{1}
Years	Club	Games (Goals)
1899	South Melbourne	2 (0)
- ^{1} Playing statistics correct to the end of 1899.

Henry Howson (15 July 1877 – 15 March 1954) was an Australian rules footballer who played with South Melbourne in the Victorian Football League (VFL).
