= Joe Garbutt (footballer, born 1878) =

Australian rules footballer

Personal information
- Full name: Joseph Henry Garbutt
- Born: 21 October 1878; South Melbourne, Victoria
- Died: 22 September 1948 (aged 69); Port Melbourne, Victoria
- Original team: Port Melbourne
- Height: 180 cm (5 ft 11 in)
- Weight: 77 kg (170 lb)
- Position: Ruck / Defence

Playing career^{1}
| Years | Club | Games (Goals) |
| 1899–1902 | South Melbourne | 39 (10) |
- ^{1} Playing statistics correct to the end of 1902.

Joseph Henry Garbutt (21 October 1878 – 22 September 1948) was an Australian rules footballer who played with South Melbourne in the Victorian Football League (VFL).
