= Artie Henley =

Australian rules footballer

Personal information
- Full name: Arthur Edwin Henley
- Born: 14 September 1878; South Melbourne, Victoria
- Died: 18 April 1941 (aged 62); Elwood, Victoria

Playing career^{1}
Years	Club	Games (Goals)
1899	South Melbourne	10 (1)
- ^{1} Playing statistics correct to the end of 1899.

Arthur Edwin Henley (14 September 1878 – 18 April 1941) was an Australian rules footballer who played for the South Melbourne Football Club in the Victorian Football League (VFL).
