= Norm McLennan =

Australian rules footballer

Personal information
- Full name: Norman John McLennan
- Born: 17 February 1887; Ballarat East, Victoria
- Died: 21 March 1909 (aged 22); Isisford, Queensland
- Original team: North Fitzroy Juniors
- Height: 180 cm (5 ft 11 in)

Playing career^{1}
| Years | Club | Games (Goals) |
| 1907–08 | Fitzroy | 7 (2) |
- ^{1} Playing statistics correct to the end of 1908.

Norman John McLennan (17 February 1887 – 21 March 1909) was an Australian rules footballer who played with Fitzroy in the Victorian Football League (VFL).

He was the older brother of Fitzroy player Harold McLennan.
