= Mike Londerigan =

Australian rules footballer

Personal information
- Full name: Michael Londerigan
- Born: 4 December 1879; North Melbourne, Victoria
- Died: 3 January 1938 (aged 58); Fitzroy, Victoria

Playing career^{1}
Years	Club	Games (Goals)
1907–09	Essendon	42 (21)
- ^{1} Playing statistics correct to the end of 1909.

Michael Londerigan (4 December 1879 – 3 January 1938) was an Australian rules footballer who played with Essendon in the Victorian Football League (VFL).
