= Charlie James (footballer) =

Australian rules footballer

Personal information
- Full name: Alfred Charles James
- Born: 22 March 1880; North Melbourne, Victoria
- Died: 9 January 1936 (aged 55); Port Melbourne, Victoria
- Original team: Albert Park
- Position: Fullback

Playing career^{1}
Years	Club	Games (Goals)
1899–1904	South Melbourne	78 (13)
- ^{1} Playing statistics correct to the end of 1904.

Alfred Charles James (22 March 1880 – 9 January 1936) was an Australian rules footballer who played with South Melbourne in the Victorian Football League (VFL).

== Birth ==
Alfred Charles James was born as Alfred Charles Lucas, the son of unwed mother Sophia Lucas, at North Melbourne on 22 March 1880. He took the surname James when Sophia later married Alfred James.

== Death ==
James died at Port Melbourne, Victoria on 9 January 1936.
