= Reginald Wilmot =

Reginald William Ernest Wilmot (4 October 1869 – 26 May 1949) was a leading sports journalist in Melbourne, Australia in the early 20th century, who used the nom de guerre of "Old Boy", and was well-respected for his writing on cricket and Australian rules football. Wilmot's writing on football and sport in general were authoritative and displayed wisdom and generosity.

Along with Hugh Buggy, Wilmot was believed to have coined the term "bodyline" during the 1932/33 Ashes Test cricket series. Wilmot also wrote several books on cricket including Defending The Ashes 1932-33 which gave a rare Australian perspective on this historic and controversial series.

== Early life ==
He was born in Bairnsdale, in Gippsland, the son of surveyor John George Winchester Wilmot and Hannah Louise Whittakers. His father, an English coffee planter in Sri Lanka, migrated to Australia in 1852. His mother, the daughter of a squatter in Tubbut, Gippsland, also had English ancestry. Through his mother, he was the first cousin of children's author Mary Grant Bruce.

Wilmot was a student at Melbourne Grammar School and from 1889 at Trinity College (University of Melbourne), where he studied law. A ringleader of the Trinity College Secession, he left before graduation.

== Career ==
He would later be heavily involved in organising amateur sport in Melbourne and often used his newspaper columns to promote the value of school sport, particularly as it was played in public schools. He supported amateurism in school sport strongly because, as he commented in an article on professional coaches in 1914, "the professional very often misses the spirit of sport in his desire to gain".

Wilmot strongly held loathing of professional sport carried over to his love of football. In 1915, then the vice-president of the Metropolitan Amateur Football Association, he used his position as The Argus football scribe, "Old Boy", to launch an attack on the mercenary nature of professional football, arguing that professional football did not improve the calibre of man and did nothing to improve the sport and, as such, was of no value to the community.

In 1932, he sailed to Sri Lanka, where he reported on the unofficial test between the England cricket team and All Ceylon All Ceylon cricket team, thereafter accompanying the England team to Australia, reporting on the "Bodyline" tour. He subsequently wrote Defending the ashes.

In July 1935 the Victorian Football League presented Wilmot with a mahogany log box for 46 years service to football as a journalist. In 1939, a long article on his reminiscences was published in The Argus, and he died in Melbourne in May 1949 after an illness of several months.

Wilmot was inducted to the Australian Football Hall of Fame in 1996, with his citation reading:

Writing for The Argus in 1935, he was given an award by the AFL for 46 years of journalism. His work was characterised by authority, wisdom and generosity.

In 1998 Wilmot was inducted to the Melbourne Cricket Ground's "Rogues Gallery", with his citation reading:

Wrote as "Old Boy" for The Argus and the Australasian from 1902 until the mid-1930s. Correspondent for The Times and Observer and The Times of Ceylon. Author of Defending The Ashes in 1932/33.

In addition to his journalism, Wilmot was employed from 1909 to 1949 as secretary of the Melbourne Athenaeum. He published a history of the Athenaeum in 1939.

== Personal life ==
On 23 November 1897, he married Jane Marion Augusta Tracy. Wilmot's son, Reginald William Winchester "Chester" Wilmot (1911–1954), was a famed World War II correspondent and historian. His daughter, Jean Winchester Wilmot, married George Fisher Bemis, of Massachusetts, and emigrated to the US, whence she sent back to the Australian Broadcasting Corporation, weekly "Letters from America", reporting on social, political and wartime life there.
