= 1897 VFL finals series =

1897 premiership season
- Date: 21 August – 4 September 1897
- Teams: 4
- Premiers: Essendon

Attendance
- Matches played: 6
- Total attendance: 30,800 (5,133 per match)
- Highest: 8,000 (second round final, Essendon vs. Collingwood)

The Victorian Football League's 1897 finals series determined the top four final positions of the 1897 VFL season. It began on the weekend of 21 August and ended on the weekend of 3 September. Essendon was crowned the 1897 VFL premiers, finishing the finals series on top of the mini-ladder.

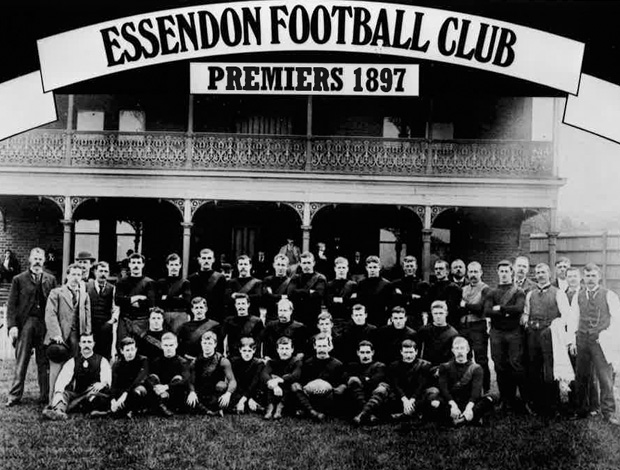
The 1897 premiers, Essendon. Players (from left): Stuckey (c), Sykes, Waugh, Kearney, Officer, Anderson, Collins, Gavin, Campbell, Cochrane, Cleghorn, Vautin, Wright, Kinnear, Forbes, Croft, O'Loughlin, Barry, Martin, Groves.

== Final ladder ==
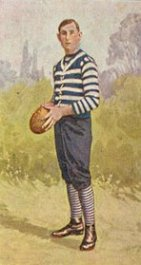
Charles Coles played 13 games and kicked 17 goals in the 1897 season, and was instrumental in helping Geelong finish on top of the ladder after the home and away season.

(P)	Premiers
	Qualified for finals

#	Team	P	W	L	D	PF	PA	%	Pts
1	Geelong	14	11	3	0	704	383	183.8	44
2	Essendon (P)	14	11	3	0	706	445	158.7	44
3	Melbourne	14	10	4	0	685	473	144.8	40
4	Collingwood	14	9	5	0	509	445	114.4	36
5	South Melbourne	14	8	5	1	595	430	138.4	34
6	Fitzroy	14	4	9	1	509	485	104.9	18
7	Carlton	14	2	12	0	376	737	51.0	8
8	St Kilda	14	0	14	0	280	966	29.0	0

Rules for classification: 1. premiership points; 2. percentage; 3. points for
Average score: 39.0
Source: AFL Tables

Won the premiership

#	Team	P	W	L	D	PF	PA	%	Pts
1	Essendon	3	3	0	0	119	67	177.6	12
2	Geelong	3	2	1	0	127	120	105.8	8
3	Collingwood	3	1	2	0	129	169	76.3	4
4	Melbourne	3	0	3	0	92	111	82.9	0

Rules for classification: 1. premiership points; 2. percentage; 3. points for
Source: AFL Tables

== Finals system ==
=== Abandoned systems ===
When the VFL was initially established at the end of 1896, it immediately announced that a finals series would be played. However, there were two other announcements of different finals formats, before the system used was ultimately decided upon late in the season.

The format that was originally announced in October 1896 was that after fourteen weeks of home-and-away matches, a finals series would be played as a simple four-team knock-out tournament amongst the top four clubs, and the gate takings from the semi-finals would be donated to charity.

By February 1897, the knock-out tournament had been abandoned in favour of a system that bore some similarities to the Page–McIntyre system which would ultimately come into use in 1931. In it, matches were to be played as follows:

- Week One: Two matches played: one between 1st vs 2nd, and one between 3rd vs 4th. As originally intended, the takings from these matches would go to charity.
- Week Two: Two matches played: one between the winners from Week One and another between the losers from Week One.
- Week Three: The two winners from Week Two would play against each other in a Final for the premiership.

Drawn matches would be decided by twenty minutes of extra time, or if still drawn after extra time, by a replay the following week.

It was realized during the season that this finals system was not entirely fair, particularly since the results of the first week of finals were somewhat meaningless; nevertheless, the league was prepared to proceed with the system right up to its scheduled commencement on 14 August. However, when inclement weather on that weekend forced the postponement of the charity round, the league used this opportunity to abandon this finals system and develop a new one.

=== 1897 finals system ===
On 17 August 1897, a new system was decided upon. The new system comprised a round-robin amongst the top four, with the provision for a play-off match for the premiership depending on the results of that round-robin. The finals system was as follows:

- The top four teams were to play off against each other in a round-robin series played over the following three weekends.
- The match-ups in the first week would be drawn by lot, the match-ups in the second week would be determined by pairing the winners and the losers from the first week against each other, and the remaining pairings would then contest the third week.
- If one club finished as the outright winner of the round-robin series on win–loss record (i.e. without using percentage as a tie-breaker), that club would automatically win the premiership.
- If two clubs had finished with the same win–loss record, those two teams would contest a Final on the following Saturday to decide the premiership.
- If three (or all four) clubs had finished with the same win–loss record, the top two clubs as determined by using percentage as a tie-breaker would contest a Final on the following Saturday to decide the premiership.

As originally planned, the takings for the first week of the finals were donated to charity; the remaining takings were divided amongst the league.

==== Venue controversy ====
A point of contention was the venue for the finals matches.

The venues were originally to be drawn by lot; however, in early August, the league decided to fix the venues in advance, and in doing so did not schedule a final at Geelong's home ground of Corio Oval, which offered much lower gate takings than the four venues in Melbourne where the matches were originally scheduled (the MCG, the Brunswick Street Oval, the Lake Oval and the East Melbourne Cricket Ground).

This decision was later reversed after Geelong, who had won the minor premiership, lodged an official complaint with the league stating that this arrangement would be unfair to the club and its supporters.

The league agreed with this assessment, and when the finals system was determined on August 17, Geelong was scheduled to host its match in the first week.

== Matches ==
=== Week one ===
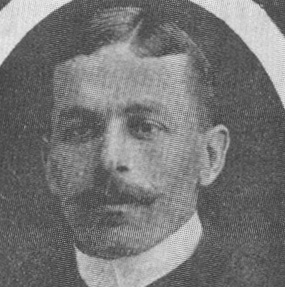
Tod Collins kicked 2 goals and was named in Essendon's best players in this 1st round match against Geelong.

==== First round final (Geelong vs. Essendon) ====
Essendon staged a tremendous last-quarter fightback to beat Geelong by a goal. Geelong were unable to stop an Essendon comeback in which Tod Collins and Arthur Cleghorn reduced the deficit to a goal, before an error by Geelong player Henry Young let Colin Campbell in for the equalising goal. Essendon player Harry Wright scored a goal soon after, and the game was sealed.

First round final
Saturday, 21 August (2:30 pm)	Geelong	def. by	Essendon	Corio Oval (crowd: 5,000)	Report
1.5 (11); 1.6 (12); 2.10 (22); 3.11 (29)	Q1; Q2; Q3; Final	0.2 (2); 1.4 (10); 1.4 (10); 5.5 (35)	Umpires: Crapp
James, Quinn, White	Goals	T. Collins 2, Campbell, Cleghorn, Wright
Maguire, Burns, McCallum, Conway, Pontin, Brockwell	Best	Forbes, Kearney, Vautin, Barry, Croft, T. Collins
This was the only finals match to be played in Geelong until 2013.

==== First-round final (Melbourne vs. Collingwood) ====
Collingwood narrowly defeated Melbourne in probably the finest game of the season. Collingwood's form had vastly improved, although the Melbourne side was sadly depleted through injuries.

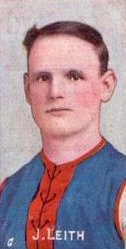
Melbourne's Jack Leith kicked four goals in the first-round match against Collingwood, the equal-highest individual effort for the series.

First round final
Saturday, 21 August (2:30 pm)	Melbourne	def. by	Collingwood	MCG (crowd: 7,000)	Report
1.1 (7); 2.2 (14); 4.5 (29); 7.5 (47)	Q1; Q2; Q3; Final	1.4 (10); 5.5 (35); 6.8 (44); 7.9 (51)	Umpires: McCoy
Leith 4, Young, Geddes, McGinis	Goals	H. Dowdall 2, Condon, Kay, Leach, Lee, McDonald
McGinis, Wardill, Robinson, Moysey, Herring, Lewis, Leith	Best	Sime, Pannam, Smith, Strickland, Leach, Gregory, Hailwood

=== Week two ===
==== Second-round final (Essendon vs Collingwood) ====
Essendon played brilliantly to account for Collingwood, kicking five goals five to three points in the final term. Essendon became the only unbeaten team after round two.

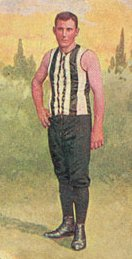
Charlie Pannam, the first player to reach 100 VFL games, kicked a goal in Collingwood's second-round match against Essendon.

Second round final
Saturday, 28 August (2:30 pm)	Essendon	def.	Collingwood	MCG (crowd: 8,000)	Report
1.1 (7); 2.8 (20); 4.11 (35); 9.16 (70)	Q1; Q2; Q3; Final	1.2 (8); 2.2 (14); 4.3 (27); 4.6 (30)	Umpires: McCoy
Waugh 4, Gavin 2, Croft, Cochrane, Cleghorn	Goals	Calleson 2, Pannam, Tulloch
Forbes, Cleghorn, Barry, Kearney, O'Loughlin	Best	Calleson, Smith, Dowdall, Strickland, Sime

==== Second-round final (Geelong vs Melbourne) ====
Geelong finished the stronger team to defeat Melbourne, with a goal by Eddy James near the end winning the game for them. The loss eliminated Melbourne from premiership contention.

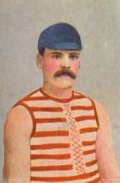
Peter Burns, pictured here in a South Melbourne guernsey, was widely regarded as one of the finest players in the late 1800s. Burns was named in Geelong's best players in all three of their finals series matches.

Second round final
Saturday, 28 August (2:30 pm)	Geelong	def.	Melbourne	Brunswick Street Oval (crowd: 4,000)	Report
0.3 (3); 2.8 (20); 4.9 (33); 5.16 (46)	Q1; Q2; Q3; Final	3.2 (20); 4.4 (28); 5.6 (36); 5.7 (37)	Umpires: Crapp
James 2, Parkin, White, Young	Goals	Moysey 2, McGinis, Steele, Young
Rankin, Joe McShane, Young, Flynn, Burns, Pontin	Best	Moysey, Herring, McLeod, Healing, Sutton, F Sheahan

=== Week three ===
==== Third-round final (Essendon vs Melbourne) ====
Entering this game, Essendon could clinch the premiership with a victory, while Melbourne was already eliminated from premiership contention. In the low-scoring encounter, Melbourne hit the post three times, and a goal by Essendon player Norman Waugh was disallowed after the bell. Edgar Croft scored the only goal of the match after marking a skewed kick in the forward pocket. The match set, and still holds, the record as the lowest-scoring in the history of the VFL/AFL, with only 22 points scored between the two teams; additionally, Essendon's 1.8 (14) also remains the lowest winning score in league history.

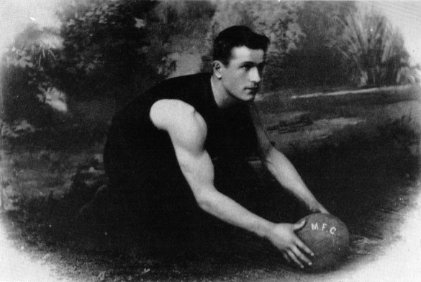
Fred McGinis was one of Melbourne's star midfielders in the late 1890s. He was best on ground for Melbourne in this match against Essendon.

Third-round final
Saturday, 4 September (2:30 pm)	Essendon	def.	Melbourne	Lake Oval (crowd: 3,800)	Report
0.1 (1); 0.4 (4); 1.6 (12); 1.8 (14)	Q1; Q2; Q3; Final	0.3 (3); 0.4 (4); 0.6 (6); 0.8 (8)	Umpires: Hood
Croft	Goals	nil
Forbes, Sykes, Cleghorn, Officer, Anderson, Barry, Wright	Best	McGinis, Lewis, Strahan, Wood, Herring, Wardill, Moodie, Hughes

==== Third-round final (Geelong vs Collingwood) ====
Entering this game, it was known that if Essendon lost to Melbourne in the other match (played at the same time), then the winner of this match would face Essendon in a playoff the following week to decide the premiership. Geelong's brilliant first-quarter burst meant Collingwood's chances of making it back into the match were near impossible. However, in a thrilling match, Geelong ran out winners by less than a goal.

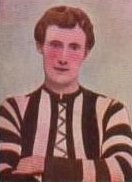
Controversial rover Dick Condon kicked two goals and was best on ground for Collingwood in this match against Geelong.

Third round final
Saturday, 4 September (2:30 pm)	Geelong	def.	Collingwood	EMCG (crowd: 3,000)	Report
5.2 (32); 7.2 (44); 8.4 (52); 8.4 (52)	Q1; Q2; Q3; Final	0.0 (0); 2.6 (18); 3.7 (25); 6.12 (48)	Umpires: McCoy
James 2, Quinn 2, White 2, Jim McShane, Thompson	Goals	Condon 2, Kay, Leach, Smith, Stranger
Rankin, Parkin, Joe McShane, Young, McCallum, Conway, Flynn, Burns	Best	Condon, Hailwood, Gregory, O'Brien, Calleson, Sime, Strickland

=== Finals series ladder ===
1897 Finals ladder
Pos	Team	Pld	W	L	D	PF	PA	PP	Pts
1	Essendon	3	3	0	0	119	67	177.6	12
2	Geelong	3	2	1	0	127	120	105.8	8
3	Collingwood	3	1	2	0	129	169	76.3	4
4	Melbourne	3	0	3	0	92	111	82.9	0

Rules for classification: 1) points; 2) percentage; 3) number of points for.

== Premiership finals teams ==
These are the finals teams for the top two teams in the round-robin series; and, rather than being "Grand Finalists" (because there was no Grand Final match in 1897), the players that are listed are players used in any one of the three round-robin finals played.

=== Essendon ===
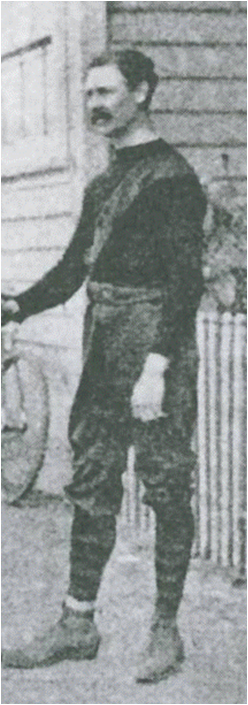
The first premiership-winning captain, Essendon's George Stuckey.

The players listed below are in no particular order; however, the captain and vice-captain appear first.

Essendon
George Stuckey (c)	Jim Anderson (vc)	Gus Kearney
Ned Officer	Tod Collins	Hugh Gavin
Colin Campbell	George Cochrane	Harry Wright
Arthur Cleghorn	George Vautin	Ted Kinnear
Charlie Forbes	Norman Waugh	Edgar Croft
Pat O'Loughlin	Son Barry	George Martin
Archie Sykes	Joe Groves	George Hastings
Dave Ferguson	-	-

=== Geelong ===
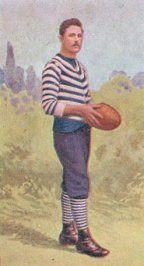
Geelong's first VFL 100-gamer, Teddy Rankin, featured in the best players in two of the three round robin matches.

The players listed below are in no particular order; however, the captain appears first.

Geelong
Jack Conway (c)	Peter Burns	Charles Coles
Jim Flynn	Teddy Holligan	Eddy James
Jim McShane	Joe McShane	Jack Parkin
Alf Pontin	Jack Quinn	Teddy Rankin
Archie Thompson	Fred White	Henry Young
Sam Brockwell	Ted Greeves	Firth McCallum
Henry McShane	Tom Maguire	Arthur Pincott

== Series records ==
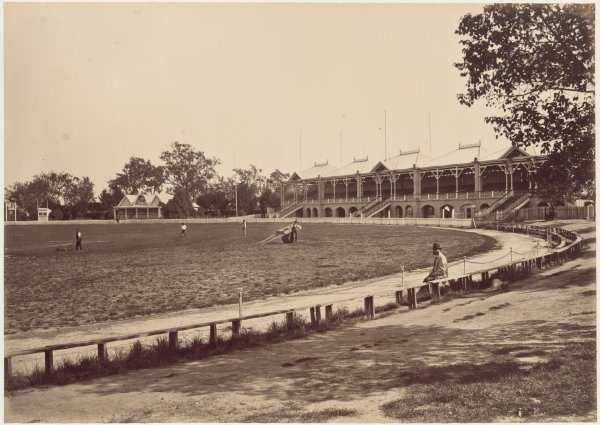
The Melbourne Cricket Ground, pictured here in 1878, hosted 8,000 fans to watch the second-round match between Essendon and Collingwood.

- Highest team score: Essendon (2nd rd vs Coll.) – 9.16 (70)
- Lowest team score: Melbourne (3rd rd vs Ess.) – 0.8 (8)
- Highest score in one quarter: Essendon (4th qtr, 2nd rd vs Coll.) – 5.5 (35)
- Lowest score in one quarter: Essendon (3rd qtr, 1st rd vs Geel.) – 0.0 (0)
- Highest winning margin: Essendon (2nd rd vs Coll.) – 40 pts
- Highest aggregate score: Essendon vs Collingwood (2nd rd), Geelong vs Collingwood (3rd rd) – 100 pts
- Most goals kicked by a player in a game: Jack Leith (Melb.) (1st rd vs Coll.), Norman Waugh (Ess.) (2nd rd vs Coll.) – 4 goals
- Most goals kicked by a player for the series: Eddy James (Geel.) (1, 2, 2) – 5 goals
- Highest attendance for one match: Essendon vs Collingwood (MCG, 2nd rd) – 8,000
- Highest gate taking for one match: Collingwood vs Melbourne (MCG, 1st rd) – £174

== See also ==
- 1897 VFL season
