= Tom Banks (Australian rules footballer) =

Australian rules footballer

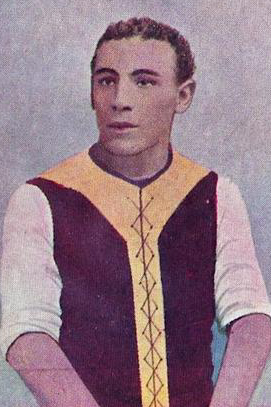
- Cigarette card of Banks in 1905

Personal information
- Full name: Thomas Banks
- Born: 17 June 1867; Maryborough, Victoria
- Died: 26 November 1919 (aged 52); Melbourne, Victoria
- Original teams: Maryborough, Fitzroy (VFA)
- Height: 180 cm (5 ft 11 in)
- Weight: 80 kg (176 lb)
- Position: Defender

Playing career^{1}
Years	Club	Games (Goals)
1888-1896	Fitzroy (VFA)	163 (22)
1897	Fitzroy (VFL)	8 (0)
Total		171 (22)

Representative team honours
Years	Team	Games (Goals)
1892-1893	Victoria (VFA)	2 (1)
- ^{1} Playing statistics correct to the end of 1897.

Career highlights
- Victoria (VFA) captain 1892, 1893; Fitzroy (VFA) captain 1893, 1894, 1895; VFA premiership captain 1895; Fitzroy life member; VFL Life member; AFC life member

Thomas Banks (17 June 1867 – 26 November 1919) was an Australian rules footballer who played for the Fitzroy Football Club in both the Victorian Football Association (VFA) and the Victorian Football League (VFL). He captained the club to its first VFA premiership in 1895, and also captained Victoria in intercolonial matches.

Born in country Victoria to an African ex-slave who escaped the Southern United States, Banks was one of the most popular footballers of his generation, and in 1911 became the first ex-player to be awarded life membership of the VFL.

== Family ==
The son of Jordan Henry Banks (1832-1887), and Sarah Jane (1849-1940), née McMullen, Thomas Banks was born on the Maryborough goldfields, His father, Jordan Henry Banks, was once an American slave:

[Tom] Banks's father, a giant of about 6ft. 3in., and built proportionately, and who commanded the respect and good will of all sections in Maryborough, was a slave before the civil war. Such was his great strength that the log cabins, in which runaways were confined on the plantations, were not strong enough to hold him. He was chased and run down by hounds; but ultimately made his escape to freedom via Canada, coming to Australia and settling in Maryborough, where all the family were born. — The Australasian, 29 November 1919.

His younger brother James Albert "Darky" Banks (1883-1930) played football and cricket for many years in Western Australia.

He married Mary Ellen Moriarty, the sister of Geoff Moriarty, on 17 December 1918 (11 months before his death).

== Footballer ==
He was an Australian rules footballer who was recruited from Maryborough and played 171 games with Fitzroy; and, as third captain of the team, he was captain of the club's first premiership team in 1895.

== After football ==
After retirement, he served at the Fitzroy football club as an administrator for many years.

== Death ==
He died at Melbourne Hospital, after an operation, on 26 November 1919.

== Obituary ==
A former Fitzroy team-mate, Sam McMichael (1869-1923), who had played alongside Banks on many occasions — who regularly contributed to The Referee under the nom de guerre "The Onlooker" — wrote an informative obituary, that clearly situates the extraordinary Banks within his era:

Tom Banks, one-time famous Fitzroy footballer, is dead. In the fullness of manhood's prime, death came. Of giant stature, his strength had no avail. Thus they pass, strong men and weak, a stream to the shadows, day by day, year by year; rushing with ever increasing velocity, and endless.
To-day footballers are picked for pace. Physique counts, too, but speed is the essential for artist of our winter game. When Tom Banks glittered, pace told also; but men were burlier, heavier. In the nineties, those halcyon days of football with champions in profusion, there were more good big men than now. The rules have tightened, and speed increased. The little man has now more scope. Weight is useful still, of course, but in the days of which write, surging waves beat the weaker to the ground. Metaphorically, the light-framed were trampled under foot.
I have in mind, the wild charges of Sonny Elms, southern skipper, and Eddie Fox, a Melbourne captain, whose muscles were tough as the iron he welded. Boliver Powell, of South Melbourne, Peter Williams, Jigger Moorehouse (sic), and Danny Hutchison, of Carlton, Tom Parkin and Joe Marmo, of Geelong, Charles Pearson, of Essendon, W. Proudfoot, of Collingwood, and Herbert Fry, a squat giant whose tremendous strength was the keystone of the Melbourne ruck. Built on the lines of Sam Langford, the colored American fighting machine, Fry, so to speak, broke the ground for the movements of McGinis, Moysey, Moodie, and Christy, and completed that famous combination.
A HERCULES WAS HE.
These were all big men, and strong, but Banks was a Hercules. I never knew Clarence Whistler, the mighty American mat-man, but I saw Sandow, the German, and Hackenschmidt the Russian wrestler, and in my view Banks paralleled with these as a perfect specimen of athletic humanity. He was built like a bullock, and yet he is dead at the age of 52 years. Ailing for a few months, he underwent an operation at the Melbourne Hospital. From the surgeon's knife he never rallied, leaving a wife and scores of friends in grief.
Deep-chested and thick, "with arms on which the standing muscles sloped", Banks carried his 14 stone or so [i.e., 89kg+] with ease. Perhaps slow from the mark, but when in full momentum his pace was terrific. From his tremendous rushes men sprayed as sparks fly from an anvil. Banks was a demon, in defence. With a greater aptitude to meet wet-day conditions, he would have ranked with the most illustrious footballer who ever played.
And him marking! On, a bright, sunny day, with sweat gleaming on set, stern face, muscles rippling with the rhythm of sweet music, he was simply superb. When Banks flew aloft his force burst all asunder. As he ascended skywards, his huge shoulders were resistless. When a grip of steel, what he touched was his, with fingers gripping the leather like a vyce. In aerial artistry I group with Banks a gifted few — Joe Hogan (St. Kilda), Hugh Gavin, Tracker Forbes, and Albert Thurgood, of Essendon, McGinis (Melbourne), W. Monaghan (Collingwood), Kerley (Geelong), Joe Tankard (North Melbourne), Peter Burns (South Melbourne), Jim Sharp, and Mick Grace, of Fitzroy, and the later day Maroon, Wal Johnson.
"WE SCATTERED: FRIENDS AND FOE."
Banks was packed with explosive energy. His strength was astounding. I was one of the Fitzroy half-backs, Banks was alongside me at centre, Paddy Hickey and his famous brother Con. on the right wing. None of us was a babe in weight, or in method. As a matter of fact, there has been no huskier half-back than Paddy Hickey, who came each Saturday from his farm at Werribee. His training was behind the plough, and, bursting with the rude vigor that comes from work in the open, he had an absolute disregard for any one's feelings, including his own.
But when Banks came through — we scattered; friend and foe. It was like a tornado tearing forest trees — the whirling of wild bison through prairie grass. He was the pivot of our defence. When pressed, our line rocked with storm and fury, but rarely broke. The shocks stunned. Woe to the weak. Thousands will remember Banks as the figurehead, dour, determined, unshaken and unshakable; like a rocky cliff withstanding the waves.
If, perchance, an elusive swung clear for the goal, he was pursued relentlessly. Once, Banks, like a tiger after a frightened deer, slipped as his fingers reached the jersey. Swerving like lightning, the forward escaped, but as Banks fell, something fluttered in his hand. It was a fragment of tough-fibred cloth, torn from the other's jacket — a tribute to his terrible tenacity.
"He beat the surges under him
And rode upon their backs."
AS A LEADER.
I was in scores and scores of games with this remarkable man, this human avalanche, so suddenly and so strangely gathered to his fathers. Indeed, until he retired, I knew no other captain. But glorious player as he was, he did not, to my mind, reach the highest flights of leadership. Not that his judgment was astray — he was cool, calculating, and brainy. His knowledge of the game was most profound; his dispositions far-seeing and sound. And in the fiercest fight, he kept his head. But temperamentally he lacked the uplift, for instance, of astute Alick Dick, whose cheery optimism inspired Essendon in their phenomenal run of premierships, or the personal domination as imposed on South Melbourne by Sonny Elms, when the Red and Whites came top in 1888, 1889, and 1890.
But though, as Fitzroy captain, Banks won but one premiership, I knew him to handle an Interstate team with conspicuous success. During that game he got a smash from Dolly Christy's elbow. Old-timers will remember the swirling rush of the accomplished Christy, and his trick of shaking free with powerful arms. I shall never forget when reaching our hotel seeing Banks' face. He was almost unrecognisable. He had a compound fracture of the nose, and tubes has been inserted to straighten it out. Christy, too, is dead, and others of that gifted team who have seen their last match are Charley Finlay, the sunny Essendon centre, Charrett, and Dinny McKay, the Southern stars, Frank Musgrove, the Fitzroy wing, and Dr. Colin Campbell.
Colin Campbell and Tracker Forbes bore off the honors of the series, the former beating the great South Australian Bunny Daley in a manner which amazed onlookers, for Daley was classed among the most illustrious. Tracker marked in a fashion I have never seen before or since. He was simply unapproachable, and poor Dinny McKay, himself a skyscraper, exclaimed to me, with an admiring expletive, on the way home, 'How was he handing them down!"
THEY PASSED TOO SOON.
Campbell was vice-captain in those matches, long years ago, and although apparently the embodiment of health and strength, died soon after gaining his medical degree. On my marriage, I got a greeting from him and Dr. Gus Kearney, another wonderful Essendon player. Both were then finishing their work at the Edinburgh University. Poor Gus is also dead — that grand little all-rounder and true sportsman — ornament to the football field as to the tennis court. I remember how modestly he referred to his tussles with the brilliant Dunlop for the Victorian tennis championship, and the generous references to his rival's prowess. I wonder how the present-day tennis cracks would fare with little Gus! Of one thing I am sure, not one would outlast him on the hottest or the longest day.
Of that great team the years have taken toll. Sometimes I drop across one and the other, Dick Gibson, the South Melbourne follower, Con Hickey, Fitzroy half-back, so prominent later as football legislator, George Vautin, and George Stuckey, a pair of Essendon brilliants; and their comrade, the once wonderful Tracker. Bill Buckley, of Fitzroy, is well, and so, too, is Jim Grace. I wonder what has become of the others — Dick Freame, the Port Melbourne centre, McCubbin, of Williamstown, and Jack Coward of Footscray, slim-waisted and barrel-chested, a magnificently proportioned half-back, of whom I have not heard for many years.
Tom Banks was buried in his father's grave, at Maryborough, but a memorial service was held in the Fitzroy rooms. There gathered hundreds of footballers past and present, surrounding the coffin of their dead friend, reverently listening to his virtues extolled. He had been a great club man. For twenty-three years he was [Fitzroy's] delegate to the League, and the Australian Football Council conferred upon him the honor of life membership. Great sympathy was, expressed for the widow, bereaved after less than twelve months' married life. In private Mr. Banks was a respected member of the staff of the Lands Department.
