= Wardill =

Wardill is a surname. Notable people with the surname include:

- Benjamin Wardill (1842–1917), Australian cricketer and cricket administrator
- Dick Wardill (1872–1929), Australian rules footballer and coach
- Emily Wardill (born 1977), British artist and filmmaker
- Joe Wardill (born 1997), British rugby league footballer
- Richard Wardill (1840–1873), Australian cricketer
