= The Footballers' Alphabet =

1898 poem

- by "Follower"
- First published in: The Leader
- Country: Australia
- Publication date: 23 July 1898

The Footballers' Alphabet was published on Saturday 23 July 1898 in the Melbourne weekly newspaper The Leader.

The poem, which had been written by its influential (Australian Rules) football correspondent, "Follower", delivered a brief comment on a number of the most prominent Australian Rules footballers playing in Melbourne in 1898, the second year of the VFL competition, presented in the alphabetical order of their family names.

Given the poem's subject and its novelty, it was very popular, and it was republished in a number of different newspapers, including The Age, and The Ovens and Murray Advertiser.

A pastiche of the poem, centred on the players of the Sunbury Football Club in the Yorke Peninsula, was published in 1920, and another, centred on the players in the Adelaide (SAFL) competition, was published in 1925.

== The Poem ==
A stands for Anderson, hard to beat back,
Likewise for Adamson, also a crack;
B stands for Barry, who's clever and strong,
And Brockwell, who plays on the wing for Geelong;
C is for Condon, the Collingwood flyer,
And Conway, who's earnest and always a trier;
D for young Dando and Dowdell (sic) – both smart;
E stands for Elder (kicks straight as a dart);
F — "Toby" Barton and Reid will go down,
Before "Tracker" Forbes will fade out of renown;
G is for Gavan (sic), who never says die,
And for Gilligan too, who can mark very high;
H stands for Hogan, a better mark still,
Also for Howson, who puts on no frill;
I stands for Ingram – from Brunswick he came –
J for Jackson and James, who are dabs at the game;
K for Gus Kearney, both brilliant and smart,
As fresh at the end as he was at the start;
L stands for Lewis, a "centre" of fame;
M for M'Ginis, the boss of the game;
N stands for Noonan, who roves for Fitzroy;
O for O'Dea (sic), who's a broth of a boy;
P is for Pleass, unsurpassed in the ruck,
And Proudfoot, renowned for his coolness and pluck;
Q stands for Quilligan (plays with "Old Dick");
R is for Robinson, clever and quick;
S —stand aside, please, and let me proclaim,
That Stuckey's the best captain playing the game;
It's a fact I believe, though I think we must own,
Fitzroy, for hard graft, has a daisy in Sloan;
T stands for South's clever back player, Trimm (sic)
(They made no mistake when they got hold of him).
U stands for Upton, a crack of the past;
V is for Vautin, who's dodgy and fast;
W for Wardill, a marvellous stayer;
X the x-ception, that can't claim a player;
Y stands for Young – the Geelong one, I mean,
A greater high marker there never was seen;
Z for old Zox, who at all football dinners,
You'll find in white waistcoat proposing "The Winners".

== See also ==
- Acrostic
