= Hugh Gavin =

Australian rules footballer (1878–1940)

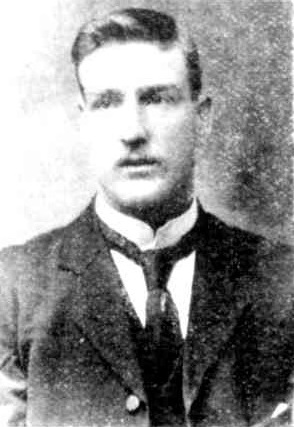
- Gavin in 1901

Personal information
- Full name: Lodovic Hugh Gavin
- Born: 25 October 1878; Stawell, Victoria
- Died: 13 November 1940 (aged 62); Royal Melbourne Hospital, Parkville, Victoria
- Position: Defender

Playing career^{1}
Years	Club	Games (Goals)
1897–1902, 1904	Essendon	112 (21)

Coaching career
Years	Club	Games (W–L–D)
1911	Western Australia	4 (1–3–0)
1915	Mines Rovers	
- ^{1} Playing statistics correct to the end of 1904.

Career highlights
- 2× VFL premiership player: 1897, 1901; Essendon captain: 1904; Essendon best and fairest: 1902

Lodovic Hugh Gavin (25 October 1878 – 13 November 1940) was an Australian rules footballer who played 108 games for the Essendon Football Club in the years following the formation of the Victorian Football League (VFL).

== Family ==
The son of William Gavin (c1830-1915), and Jane Gavin (c1834-1908), née Caldwell, Lodovic Hugh Gavin, known to his family as "Hughie", was born at Stawell, Victoria on 25 October 1878.

He married Rose Margaret Spears (1878-1944), in Perth, on 5 June 1907. They had one child: Frank Hugh Gavin (1908-1969).

== Football ==
"Hughie Gavin, erstwhile champion of Essendon ... is regarded as one of the greatest half-backs Victoria has produced and many good judges place him first. His exhibition in the 1900 Victorian [semi-]final (Essendon v. Melbourne) has never been forgotten. Of the match a leading critic said: "It was a pity, remembering Gavin's display at half-back, that Essendon failed; it would, however, have been a football injustice had Melbourne lost, so magnificently did McGinis rove." In 1903 Gavin, together with Jack ("Dookie") McKenzie, left Essendon and played on the Goldfields in this State, where his high marking, ground play and all-round ability in defence astonished the spectators. Gavin and the late Albert Patterson (sic) are ranked by many as the finest half-backs seen in Western Australia." — The West Australian, 11 July 1933.

According to Gerald Brosnan, the former VFA and VFL player, and former VFL coach, "Hughie Gavin, of Essendon, ... was the best centre half-back I ever met or saw".

The otherwise unidentified "An Old Player", one of The Sporting Globe's leading football journalists, selected Gavin as one of four "champion" centre half-backs — namely, Jim Sharp (Fitzroy VFL and Collingwood VFL), Tom Banks (Fitzroy VFA and Fitzroy VFL), Hugh Gavin, and Joe Hogan (St Kilda VFA and St Kilda VFL) — in his "Champion Footballers of the Past" team in 1923, and, later, as the stand-alone, "best" centre half-back, with Billy Payne (Carlton VFL), and Hugh Purse (Melbourne VFL) selected as his two half-back flankers, in his "Best Eighteen of the Century" team in 1936, more than thirty years after Gavin's last VFL game.

=== Essendon (VFL) ===
Gavin, later, a key defender, was a member of Essendon's inaugural premiership side in 1897. Although he only played in 13 of the team's games in his first season, he kicked 14 goals, coming second to Norman Waugh's 23 goals, Essendon's leading goalkicker for 1897. He was listed as Essendon's best player in the 1901 grand final. In 1902 he won Essendon's best player award. He was a Victorian representative in intrastate and interstate football in 1900, 1901, 1902, and 1904.

=== Boulder City ===
In 1903 he spent a season in the West Australian goldfields with Boulder City, and was described as the top player of the goldfields in that year.

=== Essendon (VFL) ===
He returned to Essendon in 1904, played in 15 matches, and served as team captain on 5 occasions.

=== Essendon (VFA) ===
In 1905 he played with Essendon Association, and served at the team's captain, in the Victorian Football Association.

=== Boulder Stars ===
In 1906, cleared by Essendon, he returned to Western Australia to play with the Boulder Stars.

In late 1906 he was suspended for "professionalism", consequent upon the facts that had been disclosed when Gavin sued Ludwig Hahn, a jeweller, and president of the Boulder Stars football club, for unpaid agreed-upon wages amounting to £23/15/-. In December 1906, and a result of the facts of the evidence that had been produced in Gavin's court case, Hahn was suspended by the Goldfields Football League for four years, and Gavin for two. Gavin appealed in August 1907, arguing that, because, Hahn's 4-year suspension had been reduced, upon Hahn's appeal, to 12 months, and that because "his case was about half as bad as that of Hahn", "he thought the board should deal with him in a like manner". Gavin's suspension was reduced to 12 months.

Gavin's career still flourished. He captained the combined Goldfields side that beat Port Adelaide on 31 July 1910, 12.12 (84) to 9.13 (67). He was captain-coach of the 1911 Western Australian carnival side which played at the Adelaide Carnival.

=== Mines Rovers ===
In 1915 he captained Mines Rovers, of the Western Australian Goldfields, to a premiership.

=== Umpiring ===
By 1916, he was featuring as a field umpire in Goldfields Football League matches.

== Death ==
Hugh Gavin died of bronchial pneumonia at the Royal Melbourne Hospital, in Parkville, Victoria, on 13 November 1940, and was buried at the Burwood Cemetery.

== See also ==
- The Footballers' Alphabet – 1898 poem
- 1911 Adelaide Carnival
