= Dave Ferguson (footballer, born 1875) =

Australian rules footballer

Personal information
- Full name: David Edgar Ferguson
- Born: 21 March 1875; Linton, Victoria
- Died: 10 June 1920 (aged 45); Victoria Park, Daylesford, Victoria
- Original teams: West Melbourne Juniors, Victorian Junior Football Association (VJFA)
- Position: half-back

Playing career^{1}
| Years | Club | Games (Goals) |
| 1897–1898 | Essendon (VFL) | 2 (0) |
| 1899–1901 | West Melbourne (VFA) | 21 (1) |
| Total | | 23 (1) |
- ^{1} Playing statistics correct to the end of 1901.

Career highlights
- VFL premiership player: 1897

David Edgar Ferguson (21 March 1875 – 10 June 1920) was an Australian rules footballer who played for the Essendon Football Club in the Victorian Football League (VFL), and for the West Melbourne Football Club in the Victorian Football Association (VFA).

== Family ==
The son of John Ferguson, and Mary Ann Ferguson, née May, David Edgar Ferguson was born at Linton, Victoria on 21 March 1875.

He married Myrtle Adele Glassbrenner (1895-1970) in 1908. They had four children, one of whom (their firstborn, Adolph) died in his infancy; the others were David Edgar Ferguson (1910–1988), John Adolph Ferguson (1911–1989), and Agnes May Ferguson (1915–1988).

== Football ==
=== Essendon (VFL) ===
In 1897, the first year of the VFL competition, he was recruited by Essendon from West Melbourne Juniors in the Victorian Junior Football Association (VJFA): "Essendon expect great things from Ferguson, a half-back from West Melbourne, who has just joined their team" (The Herald, 20 August 1897).

Under the captaincy of George Stuckey, he made his debut for Essendon in the semi-final played against Collingwood, on 28 August 1897, at the Melbourne Cricket Ground: "Ferguson, from the West Melbourne Juniors, shaped vigorously on the half-back line" (The Australasian, 4 September 1897).

Again taken from the West Melbourne Juniors, he played in his second and final match for Essendon, against Carlton, at Princes Park, on 24 May 1898.

=== West Melbourne (VFA) ===
In 1899, he transferred from the West Melbourne Juniors in the VJFA to the West Melbourne Football Club in that team's first year in the VFA competition. Overall he played in 21 Games for West Melbourne: eighteen in 1899; one in 1900; and two in 1901.

== Death ==
He died at Victoria Park, Daylesford, Victoria on 10 June 1920.
