= Jack Quinn (footballer, born 1874) =

Australian rules footballer

Personal information
- Full name: John James Quinn
- Born: 28 September 1874; Geelong
- Died: 11 December 1918 (aged 44); Richmond, Victoria

Playing career^{1}
Years	Club	Games (Goals)
1897–1898	Geelong	21 (16)
- ^{1} Playing statistics correct to the end of 1898.

John James "Jack" Quinn (28 September 1874 – 11 December 1918) was an Australian rules footballer who played with Geelong in the Victorian Football League (VFL).

== Football career ==
Quinn was a member of the Geelong squad which played in the VFL's inaugural season in 1897 and was one of the 20 Geelong players that debuted in the opening round fixture against Essendon. A forward, Quinn kicked three goals in Geelong's 81-point win over St Kilda at Junction Oval in round seven. Geelong's winning score 16.18 (114) set a league record which lasted until the 1899 VFL season. He missed just one game in the home and away season, which Geelong finished on top of the ladder.

By the end of 1897 VFL finals series which was to be decided through the round robin format, Geelong were second, with the club's six-point loss to eventual premiers Essendon in week one of the finals proving the difference. Quinn played in all three finals, for a total of 16 games for the year. He kicked 14 goals, a tally bettered by only two teammate, Eddy James and Charlie Coles.

The following season he appeared in the opening five rounds and didn't play any further senior football for Geelong.

== Personal life ==
Quinn, who worked as a tanner, got married in 1910 to Elizabeth "Lizzie" Evans, a resident of Abbotsford. They had one child, named Bernie.

== Death in sewer accident ==
On 11 December 1918, Quinn was one of three men killed when gas penetrated a sewer shaft on River Street in Richmond. Two of the men were employees of the Metropolitan Board of Works, one of whom was engaged in tarring the ladder which led down the shaft and fell down the hole when he was overcome by the gas. His colleague William Aldridge went to assist, as did Quinn who was working nearby. All three died of asphyxiation.

Both Aldridge and Quinn was honoured by the Royal Humane Society of Australasia for their rescue attempt, the society announcing in 1919 that the men's names would be recorded in the archives. The Metropolitan Board of Works donated to a fund to support the family of Jack Quinn.
