= Thomas Gilligan =

Thomas Gilligan may refer to:

- Thomas W. Gilligan, director of the Hoover Institution on War, Revolution and Peace at Stanford University
- Lieutenant Thomas Gilligan, American police officer whose shooting of James Powell instigated the Harlem riot of 1964
- Tom Gilligan (footballer, born 1874) (1874–1957), Australian rules footballer for South Melbourne
- Tom Gilligan (footballer, born 1978), Australian rules footballer for Adelaide
