= Paddy Noonan =

Australian rules footballer and coach

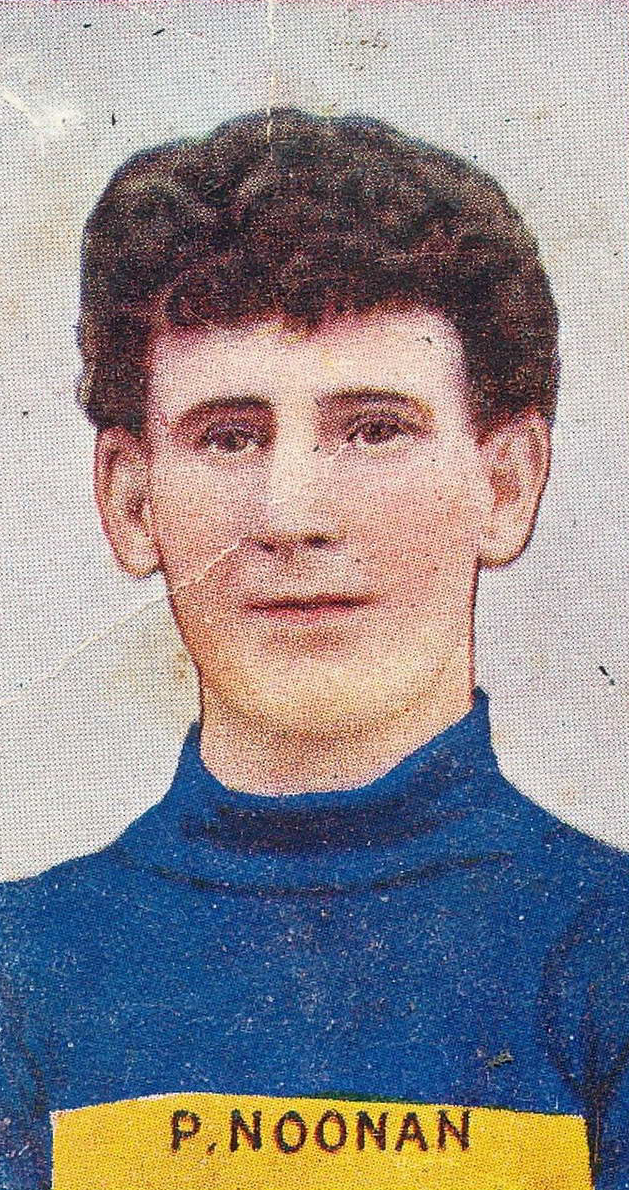
- Cigarette card of Noonan in 1908

Personal information
- Full name: Patrick Thomas Noonan
- Born: 4 September 1875; Hotham, Victoria
- Died: 27 January 1935 (aged 59); Canterbury, Victoria

Playing career^{1}
Years	Club	Games (Goals)
1893–1895	North Melbourne (VFA)	38 (0)
1896	Fitzroy (VFA)	14 (1)
1897–99	Fitzroy	36 (7)
1901–02	Carlton	19 (5)
1902–04	North Melbourne (VFA)	45 (10)
1907–08	Williamstown (VFA)	11 (2)
1909	North Melbourne (VFA)	8 (0)

Coaching career
Years	Club	Games (W–L–D)
1929	North Melbourne	13 (1–12–0)
- ^{1} Playing statistics correct to the end of 1929.

Career highlights
- VFL premiership player: 1898; 2× VFA premiership player: 1903, 1904

Patrick Thomas "Paddy" Noonan (4 September 1875 – 27 January 1935) was an Australian rules footballer who played for the Fitzroy Football Club and Carlton Football Club in the Victorian Football League.

== Football ==
A small rover, Noonan played in Fitzroy's inaugural VFL season in 1897 and then their inaugural premiership side the following year. In 1901 he crossed to Carlton and spent two seasons with the Blues.

Noonan spent the rest of his career in the Victorian Football Association (VFA) where he captained North Melbourne to premierships in 1903 and 1904. Noonan also spent some time playing at fellow VFA side Williamstown Football Club.

Following North Melbourne's entry to the VFL, Noonan was appointed coach in 1929, where North Melbourne finished last, with their only win coming against Footscray. Noonan remains the oldest first-time coach in VFL/AFL history.

== See also ==
- The Footballers' Alphabet
