= Maurie Herring =

Australian rules footballer

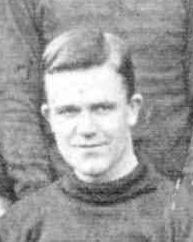

Personal information
- Full name: Maurice Stanley Herring
- Born: 21 September 1879; Kyneton, Victoria
- Died: 24 June 1962 (aged 82)
- Original team: Melbourne Grammar

Playing career^{1}
Years	Club	Games (Goals)
1897–1904	Melbourne	68 (3)
- ^{1} Playing statistics correct to the end of 1904.

Career highlights
- Melbourne premiership player 1900

Maurice "Maurie" Stanley Herring (21 September 1879 – 24 June 1962) was an Australian rules football player at the Melbourne Football Club in the Victorian Football League (VFL). He became one of the club's first premiership players, playing in the 1900 VFL Grand Final, under the captaincy of Dick Wardill. Herring made his debut against Geelong in round 2 of the 1897 VFL season, at the Melbourne Cricket Ground.

In June 1902 he entered Trinity College while undertaking studies at the University of Melbourne.
