= Archie Sykes =

Australian rules footballer

Personal information
- Full name: Archibald Sykes
- Born: 24 September 1866; Geelong, Victoria
- Died: 26 August 1957 (aged 90); Geelong, Victoria
- Original team: Geelong West

Playing career^{1}
Years	Club	Games (Goals)
1886–1888	Geelong (VFA)	36 (13)
1889–1890, 1892–1896	Essendon (VFA)	85 (39)
1891	Fremantle (WAFA 1886–1899)	9 (?)
1897	Essendon	11 (1)
Total		141 (53)
- ^{1} Playing statistics correct to the end of 1897.

Career highlights
- VFA premiership player: 1892–1894; VFL premiership player: 1897

Archibald J. Sykes (24 September 1866 – 26 August 1957) was an Australian rules footballer who played for the Essendon Football Club in the Victorian Football League (VFL), and was involved in the club's 1897 premiership win.

Sykes played for Essendon for seven years in the then VFA in 1889–1890 and 1892–1896, and in 1891, he played for Fremantle in Western Australia. Sykes was involved in three Essendon VFA premierships in 1892–1894. After Essendon joined the new Victorian Football League, Sykes played with the Bombers for one season (1897) where they won the premiership, the fourth of his career, before retiring at the end of 1897. Sykes also represented Victoria in 1893.
