= George Moysey =

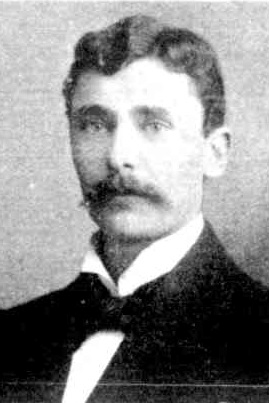
- George Moysey (1899)

Personal information
- Full name: George Bickford Moysey
- Born: 14 May 1874; Battery Point, Tasmania
- Died: 18 May 1932 (aged 58); Canterbury, Victoria
- Original team: Wesley College, Melbourne

Playing career^{1}
Years	Club	Games (Goals)
1893–1896	Melbourne (VFA)	54 (14)
1897–1899	Melbourne (VFL)	35 (25)
1906	Perth (WAFA)	17 (10)
- ^{1} Playing statistics correct to the end of 1899.

George Bickford Moysey (14 May 1874 – 18 May 1932) was an Australian sportsman who played Australian rules football and cricket at a high level. He played for the Melbourne Football Club in the Victorian Football Association (VFA) and the Victorian Football League (VFL) (VFL). He also played in the West Australian Football Association/League. He played one first-class match for Western Australia.

== Family ==
The son of Rev. George Bickford Moysey (1850–1926), and Annie Maria Moysey (1852-1924), née Teagle, George Bickford Moysey was born at Battery Point, Tasmania on 14 May 1874.

He married Ruth Janet Jesse Hastedt (1881-1973), at Mount Morgans, Western Australia, on 4 April 1902. They had four children.

== Education ==
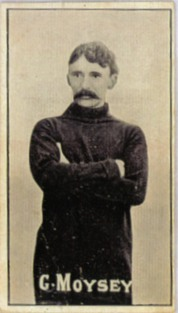
George Moysey (1906)

External images
- Public School Cricket: Wesley College, The Australasian, (Saturday, 16 December 1893), p. 1089.
- The Public Schools (Leading Public Schoolboys of the Year): G.B. Moysey, The Australasian, Saturday, 9 February 1895), p. 267.
- The Melbourne Football Team, The Australasian, Saturday, 22 June 1895), p. 1178.
- Prominent Footballers of the League: G. Moysey (Melbourne), Melbourne Punch, (Thursday, 29 June 1899), p. 21.
- Football Favourites: George Moysey: A Perth Forward, The Western Mail, (Saturday, 21 July 1906), p. 24.
- Players in the Gold Fields v. Coast Test Match: The Coastal Team, The Western Mail, (Saturday, 2 November 1907), p. 24.

He was educated at Wesley College, Melbourne, where he distinguished himself as an all-round athlete, as a footballer, and as a cricketer (wicket-keeper batsman).

== Football ==
Moysey was "an early exponent of handball, [and] was often criticised in the press for overusing the technique".

=== Melbourne (VFA) ===
Recruited from Wesley College in 1893, he played in 54 games (14 goals) for Melbourne in the VFA over four seasons (1893 to 1896).

==== Representative (VFA) ====
He played on the half-forward flank in the VFA representative team that played against South Australia, at the MCG, on 21 July 1894.

==== Champion of the season (1895) ====
At the end of the 1895 season, "Half Back" (The Age) ranked Moysey the fourth best player in the entire VFA competition, after Fred McGinis (Melbourne), Peter Burns (Geelong), and Tom Banks (Fitzroy); "Observer" (The Argus) also ranked him fourth best, after Fred McGinis, (Melbourne), Jim Grace (Fitzroy), and Peter Burns, (Geelong); and "Markwell" (The Australasian) named him as one of his eight (unranked) "Stars of the Season": Tom Banks (Fitzroy), Peter Burns (Geelong), Bill Cleary (Fitzroy), Jim Grace (Fitzroy), Fred McGinis (Melbourne), George Moysey (Melbourne), George Vautin (Essendon), and Bill Windley (South Melbourne).

=== Melbourne (VFL) ===
He was one of six Melbourne players to appear in all 17 possible games of the inaugural VFL season in 1897, which included three finals. Only two teammates bettered his 12 goals that year. He spent two more seasons at the club.

==== Representative (VFL) ====
He represented the VFL in an intercolonial fixture against South Australia, at the MCG, on 1 July 1899.

=== Perth (WAFA) ===
Having found employment at the Mount Morgans Gold Mine, Moysey moved to Western Australia in 1900, worked there for six years, then moved to Perth in 1906, where he played with the Perth Football Club, serving as its captain in 1906. He suffered a dislocated shoulder in a 1907 pre-season match, and did not play again.

== Cricket ==
Whilst working at the Western Australian goldfields, he also played cricket.

When the Marylebone Cricket Club toured Australia in 1907/08, Moysey (now located in Perth, and playing with the Subiaco Cricket Club) was picked in the Western Australian team to play the M.C.C. at the WACA Ground from 13 March to 16 March 1908. Facing an attack that consisted of English Test players, the left-handed batsman was bowled by Jack Crawford for 8 in his first innings, and dismissed by Wilfred Rhodes (caught Arthur Jones) for 5 in his second.

== Saved from drowning ==
On 18 February 1910 he almost drowned in The Basin at Rottnest Island when an undertow swept Moysey and his Subiaco cricketing team-mate Thomas Hemmant (1873-1946) out to sea. He was sinking by the time one of his party, Percy Bailey, who had already rescued Hemmant, reached Moysey and brought him back to shore. Bailey received a Royal Humane Society award for saving Moysey's life.

== Death ==
He eventually returned to Melbourne, and died in the suburb of Canterbury, Victoria on 18 May 1932.

== See also ==
- List of Western Australia first-class cricketers
