= George Cochrane (footballer) =

Australian rules footballer

Personal information
- Full name: George Priaux Cochrane
- Born: 25 September 1877; Collingwood, Victoria
- Died: 31 December 1914 (aged 37); East Melbourne, Victoria
- Original team: Wesley College

Playing career^{1}
Years	Club	Games (Goals)
1897, 1901–1904	Essendon	22 (4)
- ^{1} Playing statistics correct to the end of 1904.

Career highlights
- VFL premiership player: 1897

George Priaux Cochrane (25 September 1877 – 31 December 1914) was an Australian rules footballer who played for the Essendon Football Club in the Victorian Football League (VFL).

In the first year of competition, he became one of the club's and league's first premiership players during the 1897 VFL season under the captaincy of George Stuckey. Cochrane made his debut against Collingwood in one of the finals of the season, at the Melbourne Cricket Ground. He left the club at the end of the season to fight in the Boer War, before returning in 1901 to play 20 more games over four seasons.

"Suicide" was the finding after an inquiry into the death of George Cochrane, 37, a railway employee of Pelham Street, Carlton. Evidence was given that Cochrane was found hanging in an outhouse. He had been drinking heavily for about a week. He died suicide by hanging himself on 31 December 1914.
