= Hugh Purse =

Australian rules footballer

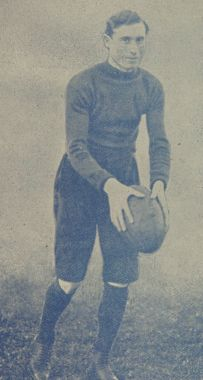

Personal information
- Full name: Hugh Landles Purse
- Born: 2 October 1881; Hawthorn, Victoria
- Died: 6 September 1952 (aged 70); Brighton, Victoria
- Original team: Brighton (VFA)
- Position: Half forward

Playing career^{1}
Years	Club	Games (Goals)
1904–1915	Melbourne	84 (26)
- ^{1} Playing statistics correct to the end of 1915.

Career highlights
- Melbourne captain: 1908

Hugh Landles Purse (2 October 1881 – 6 September 1952) was an Australian rules footballer who played with Melbourne in the Victorian Football League (VFL).

Purse, originally from Victorian Football Association (VFA) club Brighton, was the younger brother of Melbourne's 1900 premiership player Jack Purse. Noted for his strong marking, Purse played many of his early games as a half forward. He represented Victoria at the 1908 Melbourne Carnival and was also club captain of Melbourne that year.

Purse returned to Brighton, as captain, in 1910, but came back to Melbourne for a final season in 1912 before retiring.

Purse's son, Hugh C. Purse, was a leading athlete who became an Australian Army officer and died from wounds inflicted at Tobruk in 1941.

== See also ==
- 1908 Melbourne Carnival
