= Edgar Croft =

Australian rules footballer (1872–1946)

Personal information
- Full name: Edgar Ashton Fortescue Croft
- Born: 7 May 1872; Carlton, Victoria
- Died: 22 September 1946 (aged 74); Richmond, Victoria
- Original team: Scotch College / Richmond City

Playing career^{1}
Years	Club	Games (Goals)
1897–1899	Essendon	15 (12)
- ^{1} Playing statistics correct to the end of 1899.

Career highlights
- VFL premiership player: 1897

Edgar Ashton Fortescue Croft (7 May 1872 – 22 September 1946) was an Australian rules football player for the Essendon Football Club. He played in three seasons for the Bombers, playing 15 matches and scoring 12 goals. He has the unique distinction of scoring Essendon's very first League goal.

He is famous for kicking the sealing goal for Essendon against Melbourne in the match that would decide the 1897 premiership. Under the farcical round robin finals series of 1897, Essendon needed to win their final match against Melbourne to win the flag. Croft kicked the only goal of the game, after a shocking kick by Essendon player Charlie Forbes skewed into the pocket for Croft to mark and goal.

Croft was known to have suffered many dislocations and fractures which caused him to miss a lot of games. Croft stayed involved at the club for years after his playing career, as a patron until 1918.

Croft died in 1946.
