= Johnny Dando =

Australian rules footballer

Personal information
- Full name: John Alfred Dando
- Born: 28 November 1877; Port Melbourne, Victoria
- Died: 23 September 1954 (aged 76); South Melbourne, Victoria
- Original team: Melbourne Grammar

Playing career^{1}
Years	Club	Games (Goals)
1898–99, 1901	St Kilda	23 (0)
- ^{1} Playing statistics correct to the end of 1901.

Johnny Dando (28 November 1877 – 23 September 1954) was an Australian rules footballer who played with St Kilda in the Victorian Football League (VFL).

== See also ==
- The Footballers' Alphabet
