= Charlie Sime =

Australian rules footballer

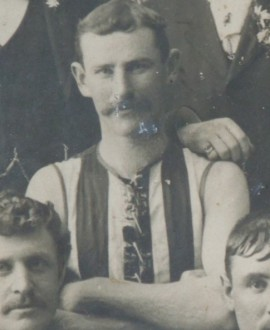
- Sime in 1896

Personal information
- Full name: John Charles Sime
- Nickname: Buffer
- Born: 3 August 1871; Collingwood, Victoria
- Died: 16 June 1961 (aged 89); Collingwood, Victoria
- Original team: Clarence
- Height: 170 cm (5 ft 7 in)
- Weight: 71 kg (157 lb)
- Position: Wing

Playing career^{1}
Years	Club	Games (Goals)
1892–96	Collingwood (VFL)	65 (1)
1897–01	Collingwood (VFL)	64 (4)
Total		129 (5)
- ^{1} Playing statistics correct to the end of 1901.

John Charles "Buffer" Sime (3 August 1871 – 16 June 1961) was an Australian rules footballer who played with Collingwood in the Victorian Football League (VFL).

== Family ==
The son of John Sime (1816-1891), and Jane Sime (1831–1906), née Mayfield, née Irvine, John Charles Sime was born at Collingwood, Victoria on 3 August 1871.

== Football ==
A number of the earlier newspaper reports have Symes as his family name.

=== Collingwood (VFA) ===
Recruited from the local football team, Clarence Juniors, of Clifton Hill, he made his debut for Collingwood in 1892, the year that Collingwood was admitted into the VFA competition.

=== Collingwood (VFL) ===
Following the formation of the Victorian Football League in 1897, Sime played for Collingwood, against St. Kilda, at Victoria Park, on 8 May 1897, in the team's first-ever match of the VFL's first season.

== Death ==
He died at his residence, in Collingwood, Victoria, on 16 June 1961.
