= Austin Lewis (footballer) =

Australian rules footballer

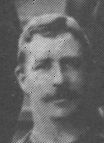

Personal information
- Full name: Austin William Lewis
- Nickname: Goosey
- Born: 26 May 1870; Richmond, Victoria
- Died: 19 September 1937 (aged 67); Richmond, Victoria

Playing career^{1}
Years	Club	Games (Goals)
1890	Richmond (VFA)	8 (4)
1891–1896	Melbourne (VFA)	105 (2)
1897–1903	Melbourne	87 (9)
Total		200 (15)
- ^{1} Playing statistics correct to the end of 1903.

Career highlights
- VFL premiership player: 1900

Austin William "Goosey" Lewis (26 May 1870 – 19 September 1937) was an Australian rules footballer who played for the Melbourne Football Club in the Victorian Football Association (VFA) and Victorian Football League (VFL). He played in the 1900 premiership under the captaincy of Dick Wardill.

== Football ==
Lewis made his VFL debut against South Melbourne in round 1 of the 1897 VFL season at the Lake Oval, having played 113 matches (eight for Richmond and 105 for Melbourne) in the VFA.

Lewis retired in 1903 after 87 VFL games, for a career total of exactly 200. His 192 games for Melbourne included the club's 1900 Grand Final win, and was the club record until it was broken by Percy Beames in Round 14, 1943.

At the conclusion of his playing career, Lewis became a curator at the Melbourne Cricket Ground.

== Legacy ==
In 2014, a vintage jumper worn by Lewis in the 1900 VFL Grand Final was placed for sale by his descendants. It was reportedly "one of the oldest in Australian football", but was withdrawn from sale after failing to meet the reserve price.
