= Charlie Young (footballer, born 1877) =

Australian rules footballer (1877–1914)

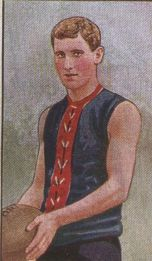

Personal information
- Full name: Charles Herbert Lockyer Young
- Born: 7 December 1877; Kew, Victoria
- Died: 22 February 1914 (aged 36); Glenelg, South Australia

Playing career^{1}
Years	Club	Games (Goals)
1897–1904	Melbourne	129 (46)
- ^{1} Playing statistics correct to the end of 1904.

Career highlights
- VFL premiership player: 1900; Melbourne leading goalkicker 1898

Charles Herbert Lockyer Young (7 December 1877 – 22 February 1914) was an Australian rules footballer who played the Melbourne Football Club in the Victorian Football League (VFL). He became one of the club's first premiership players, playing in the 1900 VFL Grand Final, under the captaincy of Dick Wardill. Young made his debut against South Melbourne in Round 1 of the 1897 VFL season, at the Lake Oval, and topped the club's goalkicker tally in 1898. He has been given the Melbourne Heritage Number of 20, based on the order of his debut for the club. Young was named in 2008 as a "legend of the game" on the club's 150th anniversary.
