= Albert Banks =

Australian sportsman

Personal information
- Full name: James Albert Banks
- Born: 10 December 1883; Maryborough, Victoria, Australia
- Died: 5 July 1930 (aged 46); Perth, Western Australia
- Source: Cricinfo, 14 July 2017

James Albert "Darky" Banks (10 December 1883 – 5 July 1930), the son of a former American slave, was an Australian cricketer and Australian rules footballer. He played two first-class matches for Western Australia between 1908/09 and 1920/21.

== Family ==
The son of Jordan Henry Banks (1832-1887), and Sarah Jane (1849-1940), née McMullen, James Albert Banks was born on the Maryborough goldfields on 10 December 1883. His father, Jordan Henry Banks, was once an American slave:

Mr. Banks's father [Jordan Henry Banks (1832–1887)], a giant of about 6ft. 3in., and built proportionately, and who commanded the respect and good will of all sections in Maryborough, was a slave before the civil war. Such was his great strength that the log cabins, in which runaways were confined on the plantations, were not strong enough to hold him. He was chased and run down by hounds; but ultimately made his escape to freedom via Canada, coming to Australia and settling in Maryborough, where all the family were born. — The Australasian, 29 November 1919.

His brother Thomas Banks (1867-1919) played Australian rules football for Fitzroy in the Victorian Football League.

== Football ==
He played in the West Australian Football League for South Fremantle (148 games) and Perth (39 games), captaining South Fremantle in 1909, 1912 and 1914.

== Death ==
He died at Perth on 5 July 1930, his body was found in the backyard of a lodging house. The cause was not known, although there were no signs of violence.

== See also ==
- List of Western Australia first-class cricketers
