= Jack Purse =

Australian rules footballer

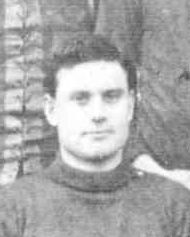

Personal information
- Full name: John Landles Purse
- Born: 28 June 1879; Hawthorn, Victoria
- Died: 2 March 1953 (aged 73); Boyup Brook, Western Australia
- Original team: Brighton
- Height: 179 cm (5 ft 10 in)
- Position: Defender

Playing career^{1}
Years	Club	Games (Goals)
1898	St Kilda	1 (0)
1900–1908	Melbourne	109 (12)
Total		110 (12)

Representative team honours
Years	Team	Games (Goals)
1901, 1904	Victoria	
- ^{1} Playing statistics correct to the end of 1908.

Career highlights
- VFL premiership player: 1900

John Landles Purse (28 June 1879 – 2 March 1953) was an Australian rules footballer who played for the St Kilda Football Club and Melbourne Football Club in the Victorian Football League (VFL).

== Family ==
The son of John Purse (1838–1893), and Alison Purse (1845–1927), née Landles, John Landles Purse was born in Hawthorn, Victoria on 28 June 1879.

He married Victoria May McKay (1878–1972) on 25 April 1904. One of their sons, Neil Landles Purse (1911–1942), was killed in action serving with the Second AIF on 26 October 1942.

== Football ==
Recruited from Brighton in the Metropolitan Junior Football Association, Purse made his VFL debut for St Kilda against Geelong in round 17 of the 1898 VFL season, at Corio Oval. He transferred to Melbourne in 1900 and in his first season became a premiership player, playing in the 1900 VFL Grand Final at centre half-back. He has been given the Melbourne Heritage Number of 77, based on the order of his debut for the club.

His younger brother Hugh Purse also played for Melbourne.

== Death ==
He died at his home in Boyup Brook, Western Australia on 2 March 1953.
