= Colin Campbell (sportsman, born 1872) =

Australian rules footballer & cricketer (1872–1907)

Personal information
- Full name: Colin Mansfield Campbell
- Born: 13 August 1872; Cressy, Tasmania
- Died: 3 April 1907 (aged 34); Winlaton, England
- Debut: Semi Final, 1897, Essendon vs. Geelong, at Corio Oval

Playing career^{1}
Years	Club	Games (Goals)
1897–1899	Essendon	12 (4)
- ^{1} Playing statistics correct to the end of 1899.

Career highlights
- Essendon (VFA): Vice-captain 1893; VFA premiership player: 1891, 1892, 1893, 1894; VFL premiership player: 1897

Colin Mansfield Campbell (13 August 1872 – 3 April 1907) was an Australian rules footballer who played for Essendon Football Club in the Victorian Football League (VFL) and a first-class cricketer, representing Tasmania.

== Family ==
The youngest son of Donald Campbell (1833–1907), and his second wife, Elizabeth Campbell (1825–1910), née Brumby, Colin Mansfield Campbell was born at Cressy, Tasmania on 13 August 1872.

== Education ==
Educated at Horton College, Ross, Tasmania, he commenced his medical studies medicine at Queen's College at the University of Melbourne in 1891, and completed them in Scotland.

In 1903 he qualified for the Scottish Triple Conjoint Diploma; and, in so doing, he gained the following qualifications:

- Licentiate of the Royal College of Physicians of Edinburgh (L.R.C.P. Edin.).
- Licentiate of the Royal College of Surgeons of Edinburgh (L.R.C.P. Edin.).
- Licentiate of the Faculty of Physicians and Surgeons of Glasgow (L.F.P.S. Glas.).

== Football ==
He attracted the Essendon (then VFA) club's attention during Essendon's 1890 Tasmanian tour match against a combined North-Eastern Football team. Immediately he arrived in Melbourne to commence his medical studies, he began his career with Essendon, kicking a goal, and one of its best players, in the first match of the 1891 season, against Footscray, on 2 May 1891.

Campbell played for Essendon in the Victorian Football Association (VFA) from 1891 to 1896, was its vice-captain in 1893, and was a member of its four premiership sides.

Although not playing at all during the home-and-away season, he played for Essendon (VFL) in the first two matches of the three-match inaugural VFL finals series on 21 August (against Geelong) at the Corio Oval, on 28 August 1897 (against Collingwood) at the MCG. He was unavailable for the third and final match, on 4 September 1897 (against Melbourne) at the Lake Oval, due to illness. On the basis of the team's victories in the round-robin competition, and because no Grand Final was needed, Essendon was awarded the 1897 premiership; and, so, due to the round-robin nature of the contest, Campbell was (and still is) legitimately recognized as "a premiership player".

He also played in 1898 and 1899, including the (losing) 1898 VFL Grand Final, in which he played at centre half-forward.

== Cricket ==
Also in 1897, Campbell represented Tasmania in a first-class cricket match against Victoria at the North Tasmania Cricket Association Ground. He was dismissed in both innings by another debutant in James Giller, for scores of 0 and 17.

Whilst in England he played rugby and cricket, scoring over 1000 runs in a season for the Ryton Cricket Club.

== Death ==
He died in 1907 of pneumonia, whilst working and living in Winlaton, England.

== See also ==
- List of Tasmanian representative cricketers
