= John Stuckey =

Australian cricketer

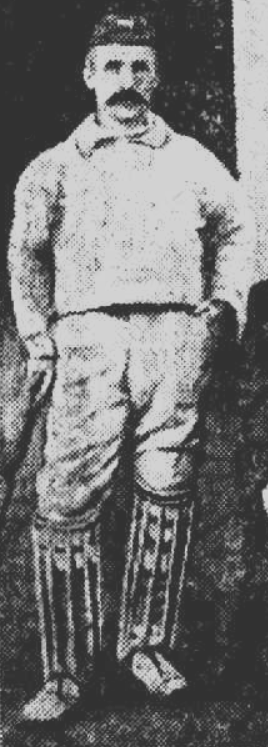

Personal information
- Full name: John Henry Stuckey
- Born: 3 July 1869; Walhalla, Victoria, Australia
- Died: 10 August 1952 (aged 83); Cheltenham, Victoria, Australia
- Batting: Left-handed

Domestic team information
- Years: Team
- 1891–1910: Victoria
- Source: Cricinfo, 26 July 2015

John Henry Stuckey (3 July 1869 – 10 August 1952) was an Australian cricketer. He played 53 first-class cricket matches for Victoria between 1891 and 1910.

His brother, George, also played cricket for Victoria and was a prominent Australian rules football player.

== See also ==
- List of Victoria first-class cricketers
