= Wally O'Cock =

Australian rules footballer

Personal information
- Full name: Wallace Alfred Richard O'Cock
- Born: 17 June 1875; Clifton Hill, Victoria
- Died: 14 June 1951 (aged 75); Richmond, Victoria
- Original team: Albion United
- Debut: Round 1, 1897, Carlton vs. Fitzroy, at Brunswick Street
- Height: 175 cm (5 ft 9 in)
- Weight: 74 kg (163 lb)

Playing career^{1}
Years	Club	Games (Goals)
1897–1901	Carlton	41 (25)
- ^{1} Playing statistics correct to the end of 1901.

Wally O'Cock (17 June 1875 – 14 June 1951) was an Australian rules footballer in the Victorian Football League (VFL).

O'Cock joined Carlton in the VFA in 1896, and was their top goalscorer for the year. He continued with the club after its move to the newly created VFL, making his debut in Round One in 1897. Later that year, O'Cock was unable to obtain medical clearance before a game against Melbourne and played under the name "Alfred Wallace", kicking Carlton's only two goals in a 28-point loss.

O'Cock left Carlton in 1901 before they could lift from the bottom of the ladder.
