= Tom Lee (footballer, born 1874) =

Australian rules footballer

Personal information
- Full name: Thomas Francis Lee
- Born: 11 December 1874; Nirranda, Victoria
- Original team: Richmond City
- Height: 180 cm (5 ft 11 in)
- Weight: 82 kg (181 lb)

Playing career^{1}
Years	Club	Games (Goals)
1897–98	Collingwood	8 (2)
- ^{1} Playing statistics correct to the end of 1898.

Thomas Francis Lee (born 11 December 1874) was an Australian rules footballer who played with Collingwood in the Victorian Football League (VFL).

== Family ==
The son of John Lee (1824–1904), and Elizabeth Lee (1837–1874), née Conn, Thomas Francis Lee was born at Nirranda, Victoria on 11 December 1874.
