= Rhoda McDonald =

Australian rules footballer

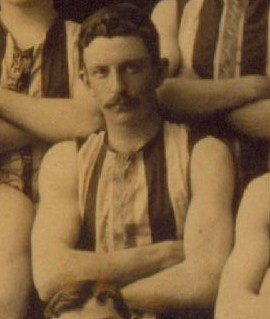
- McDonald in 1896 during his Collingwood VFA career

Personal information
- Full name: Robert Ernest McDonald
- Born: 29 April 1878; South Melbourne, Victoria
- Died: 4 December 1937 (aged 59); Liverpool, New South Wales
- Original team: South Adelaide (SAFA) / Collingwood Juniors

Playing career^{1}
| Years | Club | Games (Goals) |
| 1897 | Collingwood | 8 (2) |
| 1901 | Carlton | 4 (1) |
| Total | | 12 (3) |
- ^{1} Playing statistics correct to the end of 1901.

Robert Ernest "Rhoda" McDonald (29 April 1878 – 4 December 1937) was an Australian rules footballer who played with Collingwood and Carlton in the Victorian Football League (VFL).
