= Bill O'Brien (footballer, born 1877) =

Australian rules footballer

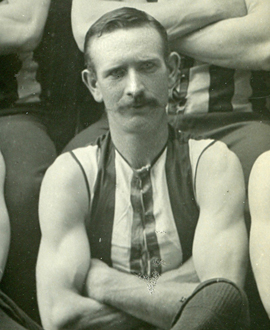
- O'Brien in 1901

Personal information
- Full name: Bill O'Brien
- Born: 23 March 1877
- Died: 31 March 1942 (aged 65)
- Original team: West Melbourne
- Height: 175 cm (5 ft 9 in)
- Weight: 78 kg (172 lb)

Playing career^{1}
Years	Club	Games (Goals)
1897–01	Collingwood	67 (0)
- ^{1} Playing statistics correct to the end of 1901.

Bill O'Brien (23 March 1877 – 31 March 1942) was a former Australian rules footballer who played with Collingwood in the Victorian Football League (VFL).
