= Dinny McKay =

Australian rules footballer

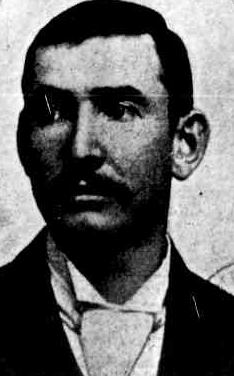

Personal information
- Full name: Denis McKay
- Born: 23 November 1867; Ballarat
- Died: 17 August 1897 (aged 29); Melbourne
- Original team: South Ballarat
- Height: 178 cm (5 ft 10 in)

Playing career^{1}
| Years | Club | Games (Goals) |
| 1885-1886 | South Ballarat | 7 (1) |
| 1886–1891, 1894–1896 | South Melbourne (VFA) | 154 (123) |
| 1892–1893 | Richmond | 31 (20) |
| 1897 | South Melbourne (VFL) | 14 (14) |
| Total | | 206 (158) |
- ^{1} Playing statistics correct to the end of 1897.

Denis "Dinny" McKay (23 November 1867 – 17 August 1897) was an Australian rules footballer who played with South Melbourne in the Victorian Football Association (VFA) and Victorian Football League (VFL). He played with Richmond in 1892 and 1893, but otherwise was with South Melbourne until their final VFA season in 1896. His sudden death during the 1897 VFL season was considered a severe loss to football.

== Career ==
=== VFA years ===
Born in 1867, McKay played originally for the South Ballarat Football Club.

He began at South Melbourne in 1886 and became a leading member of the team. Regarded as one of the best all-round players in the colony, McKay was a regular Victorian representative in intercolonial matches.

A forward, he was the competition's leading goal-kicker in the 1888 VFA season, credited with either 49 or 50 goals depending on the source. South Melbourne were premiers that season, the first of three successive premierships McKay was part of.

In 1892 he went over to Richmond, but returned to South Melbourne after two seasons.

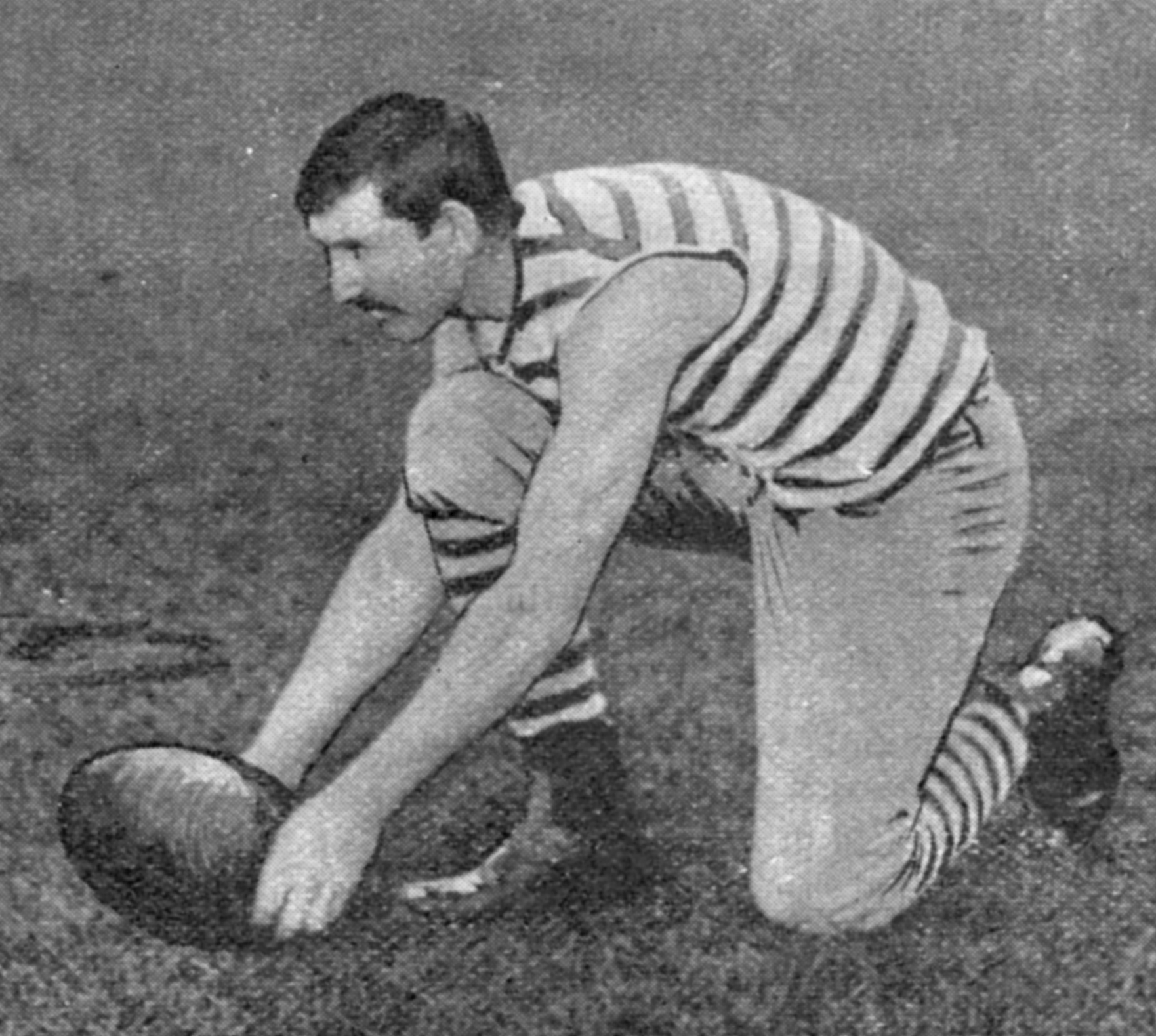
Dinny McKay preparing to kick

In the 1896 VFA season, he played in the premiership play-off against Collingwood, which is retrospectively treated as Victoria's first grand final (it was the first match explicitly referred to as such). Collingwood won by one goal, and McKay with two goals was the game's only multiple goal-kicker.

=== 1897 VFL season ===
The following year, South Melbourne were a foundation club in the inaugural VFL season.

McKay has the distinction of kicking South Melbourne's first VFL goal, which came late in the second quarter of their opening round loss to Melbourne at Lake Oval, with a snap shot at goal that bounced through. In round seven, against Fitzroy, he kicked two goals in a game which finished in the VFL's first ever draw. His 14 goals in 1897 included three in both matches against Carlton, and were enough to be South Melbourne's leading goal-kicker.

As South Melbourne failed to make the finals, McKay's season ended in round 14, a one-point win over Fitzroy at Lake Oval on 7 August, which was also his 14th VFL appearance, having not missed a game all year.

== Death ==
On 17 August 1897, at the age of 29, McKay died at Melbourne Hospital, where he had gone with an internal complaint. He had suffered a burst appendix and died from peritonitis. His death was not, as was believed for many years, the result of an on-field injury.

His funeral was one of the largest to have been held in the South Melbourne area, attended by representatives from all of the league, VFA and leading junior clubs. Nearly 150 vehicles were in the cortege and it was written that the funeral took close to 30 minutes to pass any given point.

He had been married with two children, the eldest three and a half years old, the youngest 18 months.
