= Gus Kearney =

Australian rules footballer and tennis player

Personal information
- Full name: Augustus Daniel Kearney
- Born: 22 November 1870; Kyneton, Victoria
- Died: 10 March 1907 (aged 36); The Alfred Hospital, Victoria
- Original team: Geelong College

Playing career^{1}
Years	Club	Games (Goals)
1897–1898	Essendon	22 (9)
- ^{1} Playing statistics correct to the end of 1898.

Career highlights
- VFL premiership player: 1897

Augustus Daniel Kearney (22 November 1870 – 10 March 1907) was an Australian rules footballer who played for the Essendon Football Club in the Victorian Football League (VFL), and was a part of the Bombers' 1897 premiership team.

== Football ==
Kearney came from Geelong College and played in three of the Essendon Association's premierships between 1892 and 1894. Kearney was a skilled follower who played intercolonial football in 1893.

Kearney was the vice-captain of Essendon in his two playing years for the club in the Victorian Football League, 1897 and 1898.

== Tennis ==
He also excelled at tennis, winning the New South Wales Championships twice and Victorian Championships title six times.

== Death ==
Kearney died at the age of 36, on 10 March 1907, after a nasal operation.

== Legacy ==
The Dr Gus Kearney Memorial Prize is still presented annually by Geelong College, to one boy in recognition of "all-round ability and service to the College".

The Prize "was first awarded in 1908 in memory of Dr 'Gus' Kearney, an outstanding sportsman and former captain of the School who died at the young age of thirty-six years in March, 1907. The award was provided by the Old Collegians' Association. In 1908, Norman Morrison described the award 'to be awarded annually on the lines of the Rhodes Scholarships, for proficiency in school work, combined with prowess in athletic sports'."
