= Fred Kay =

Australian rules footballer

Personal information
- Full name: Frederick Charles Kay
- Born: 29 September 1878; Fitzroy, Victoria
- Died: 16 April 1917 (aged 38); East Melbourne, Victoria
- Original team: Collingwood Juniors
- Height: 179 cm (5 ft 10 in)
- Weight: 72 kg (159 lb)

Playing career^{1}
Years	Club	Games (Goals)
1897	Collingwood	11 (6)
- ^{1} Playing statistics correct to the end of 1897.

Frederick Charles Kay (29 September 1878 – 16 April 1917) was an Australian rules footballer who played with Collingwood in the Victorian Football League (VFL).
