= 1900 VFL grand final =

Grand final of the 1900 Victorian Football League season

1900 VFL Grand Final

Melbourne	Fitzroy
4.10 (34)	3.12 (30)
	1	2	3	4
MEL	2.3 (15)	2.5 (17)	4.8 (32)	4.10 (34)
FIT	1.4 (10)	2.7 (19)	2.7 (19)	3.12 (30)
- Date: 22 September 1900
- Stadium: East Melbourne Cricket Ground
- Attendance: 20,181

Accolades
- Australian Football Hall of Fame: 1. Vic Cumberland (1996)

The 1900 VFL Grand Final was an Australian rules football game contested between the Melbourne Football Club and Fitzroy Football Club, held at the East Melbourne Cricket Ground in Melbourne on 22 September 1900. It was the 3rd annual Grand Final of the Victorian Football League, staged to determine the premiers for the 1900 VFL season. The match, attended by 20,181 spectators, was won by Melbourne by a margin of 4 points.

== Lead-up ==
Although Melbourne only won six of its fourteen home-and-away fixtures to finish sixth on the ladder, it won its sectional round-robin and defeated the other sectional winner, Essendon, in the semi-final for the right to face the minor premiers, Fitzroy, in the Grand Final; Fitzroy had won the previous two premierships and was aiming for a third premiership in a row.

The winner of this match would win the premiership.

== Teams ==
Arthur Sowden, and Bill Bowe were unable to play for the Melbourne team, due to injury, and Eric Gardner was unavailable.

Melbourne	Fitzroy

Melbourne
B:	Maurie Herring	Eddie Sholl	Les Rippon
HB:	Harry Parkin	Jack Purse	Bill McClelland
C:	Corrie Gardner	Charlie Young	Harold Hay
HF:	Austin Lewis	Jack Leith	Frank Langley
F:	Dick Wardill (c)	Stewart Geddes	Tommy Ryan
Foll:	George Moodie	Vic Cumberland	Fred McGinis

Fitzroy
B:	Hugh McEwen	Geoff Moriarty	Ern Jenkins
HB:	Bert Sharpe	Alec Sloan (c)	Pat Hickey
C:	Eddie Drohan	Harry Clarke	Kelly Robinson
HF:	Tammy Beauchamp	Alf McDougall	Lou Barker
F:	Pat Descrimes	Gerald Brosnan	Chris Kiernan
Foll:	Mick Grace	Bill Potter	Bill McSpeerin

- Umpire – Henry "Ivo" Crapp

== Statistics ==
=== Goalkickers ===
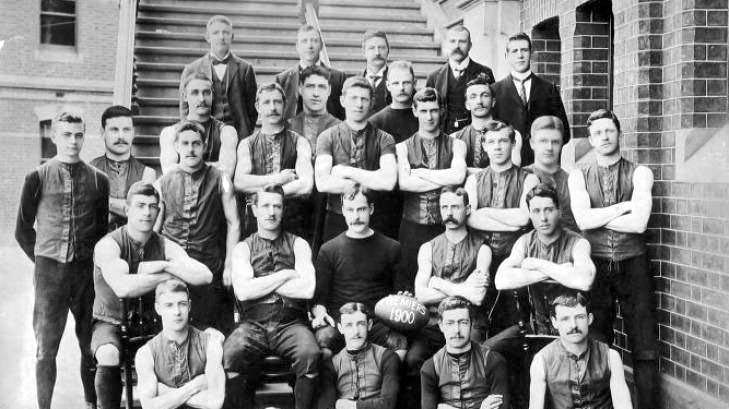
Melbourne team, premiers

Melbourne:

- Geddes 1
- Leith 1
- Ryan 1
- Wardill 1

Fitzroy:

- Grace 2
- Barker 1

=== Attendance ===
- Crowd – 20,181

== See also ==
- 1900 VFL season
