= Sam Brockwell =

Australian rules footballer

Personal information
- Full name: Frederick Leopold Samuel Brockwell
- Born: 4 February 1871; Geelong, Victoria
- Died: 12 February 1945 (aged 74); Geelong, Victoria
- Original team: Newtown

Playing career^{1}
| Years | Club | Games (Goals) |
| 1897–98 | Geelong | 29 (0) |
| 1900 | South Melbourne | 15 (4) |
| Total | | 44 (4) |
- ^{1} Playing statistics correct to the end of 1800.

Frederick Leopold Samuel Brockwell (4 February 1871 – 12 February 1945) was an Australian rules footballer who played with Geelong and South Melbourne in the Victorian Football League (VFL).

== See also ==
- The Footballers' Alphabet
