= George Callesen =

Australian rules footballer

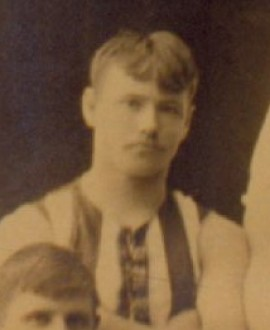
- Callesen in 1896 during his Collingwood VFA career

Personal information
- Full name: George Theis Callesen
- Born: 24 August 1874; Chewton, Victoria
- Died: 25 August 1946 (aged 72); Boronia, Victoria
- Original team: Preston United
- Height: 178 cm (5 ft 10 in)
- Weight: 75 kg (165 lb)

Playing career^{1}
Years	Club	Games (Goals)
1896	Collingwood (VFA)	17 (-)
1897–98	Collingwood	17 (5)
- ^{1} Playing statistics correct to the end of 1898.

George Theis Callesen (24 August 1874 – 25 August 1946) was an Australian rules footballer who played with Collingwood in the Victorian Football League (VFL).
