= Nirranda =

Nirranda Victoria
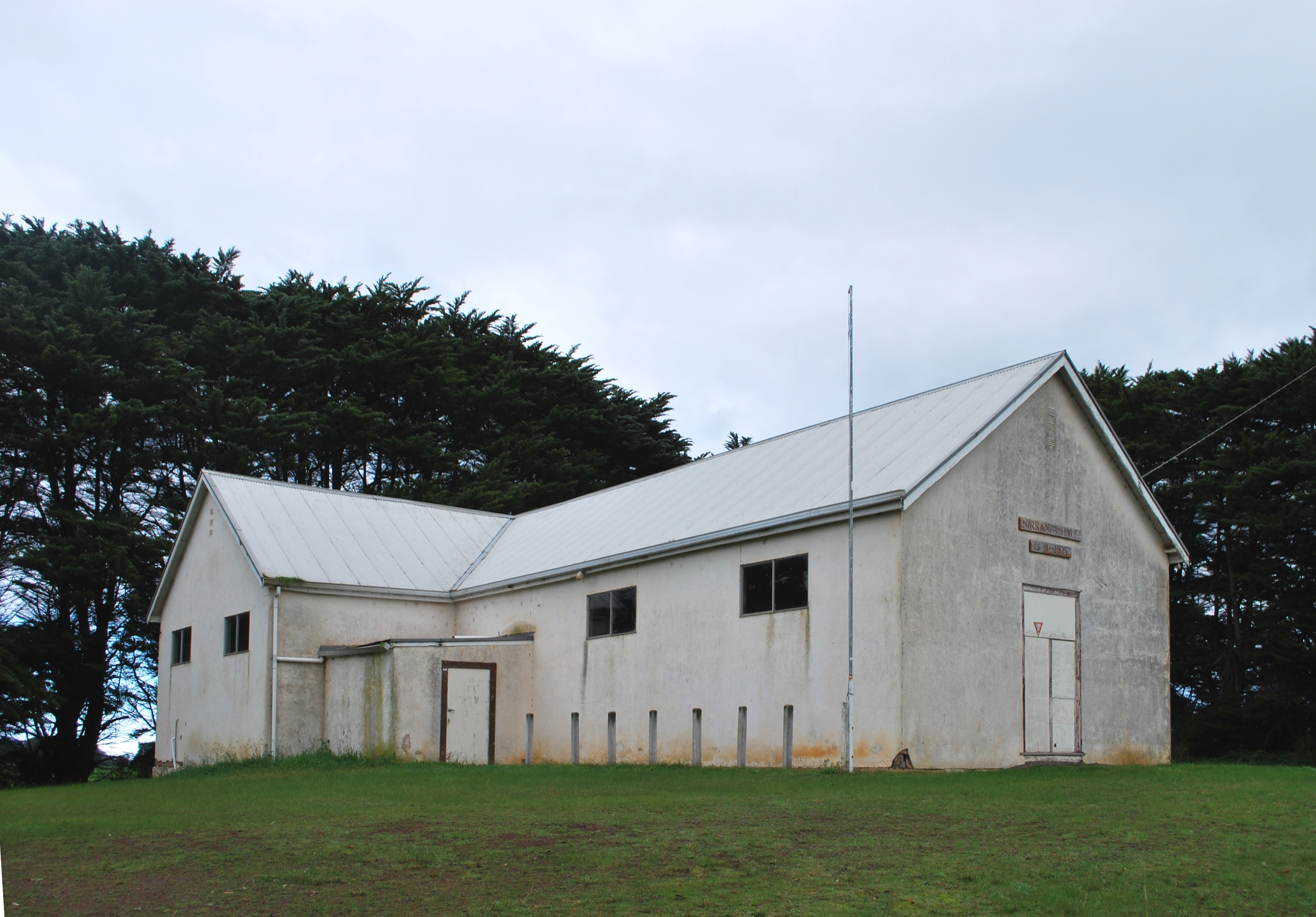
- Nirranda Hall, 2010

- Coordinates: 38°30′00″S 142°45′26″E
- Population: 56 (2016 census)
- Postcode(s): 3268
- Location: 246 km (153 mi) SW of Melbourne; 34 km (21 mi) SE of Warrnambool
- LGA(s): Shire of Moyne
- State electorate(s): Polwarth
- Federal division(s): Wannon

Nirranda is a locality in south west Victoria, Australia. The locality is in the Shire of Moyne and on the Great Ocean Road, 246 kilometres (153 mi) west of the state capital, Melbourne.

At the 2016 census, Nirranda had a population of 56.
