= Tom Gilligan (footballer, born 1874) =

Australian rules footballer

Personal information
- Full name: Thomas John Gilligan
- Born: 21 June 1874; Rochford, Victoria
- Died: 19 December 1957 (aged 83); Castlemaine, Victoria

Playing career^{1}
Years	Club	Games (Goals)
1897–1899	South Melbourne	42 (26)
- ^{1} Playing statistics correct to the end of 1899.

Thomas John Gilligan (21 June 1874 – 19 December 1957) was an Australian rules footballer who played for the South Melbourne Football Club in the Victorian Football League (VFL).

== See also ==
- The Footballers' Alphabet
