= Fred Waugh =

Australian rules footballer (1869–1919)

Personal information
- Full name: Richard Frederick Waugh
- Born: 1 December 1869; South Melbourne, Victoria
- Died: 23 June 1919 (aged 49); Melbourne Hospital

Playing career^{1}
Years	Club	Games (Goals)
1897, 1900	South Melbourne	22 (3)
- ^{1} Playing statistics correct to the end of 1900.

Richard Frederick Waugh (1 December 1869 – 23 June 1919) was an Australian rules footballer who played with South Melbourne in the Victorian Football League (VFL).

Waugh was unable to play in South Melbourne's team for the Round 11 game with St Kilda in 1897 after attempting suicide. He had been spurned by his lover, and had become disconsolate. His mother found him in his room covered in blood, having cut his throat with a blunt knife. He missed severing his windpipe and blood vessels, and a doctor was able to repair the wounds.
