= Alf Pontin =

Australian rules footballer

Personal information
- Full name: Alfred Edward Pontin
- Born: 22 September 1869; Geelong, Victoria
- Died: 7 March 1930 (aged 60); Richmond, Victoria

Playing career^{1}
Years	Club	Games (Goals)
1897	Geelong	13 (1)
- ^{1} Playing statistics correct to the end of 1897.

Alfred Edward Pontin (22 September 1869 – 7 March 1930) was an Australian rules footballer who played for the Geelong Football Club in the Victorian Football League (VFL).
