= Bert Robinson (footballer) =

Australian rules footballer

Personal information
- Full name: Albert William Robinson
- Born: 17 June 1878; Kingston, Victoria
- Died: 21 March 1901 (aged 22); Ballarat
- Original team: Scotch College
- Position: Follower

Playing career^{1}
Years	Club	Games (Goals)
1896	Melbourne (VFA)	1 (0)
1897	Melbourne	13 (2)
- ^{1} Playing statistics correct to the end of 1897.

Albert William Robinson (17 June 1878 – 21 March 1901) was an Australian rules footballer who played for the Melbourne Football Club in both the Victorian Football Association (VFA) and the Victorian Football League (VFL).

== Family ==
The son of John Coulson Robinson (1828–1884), and Lucy Robinson (1836-1903), née English, Albert William Robinson was born at Kingston, Victoria on 17 June 1878.

== Education ==
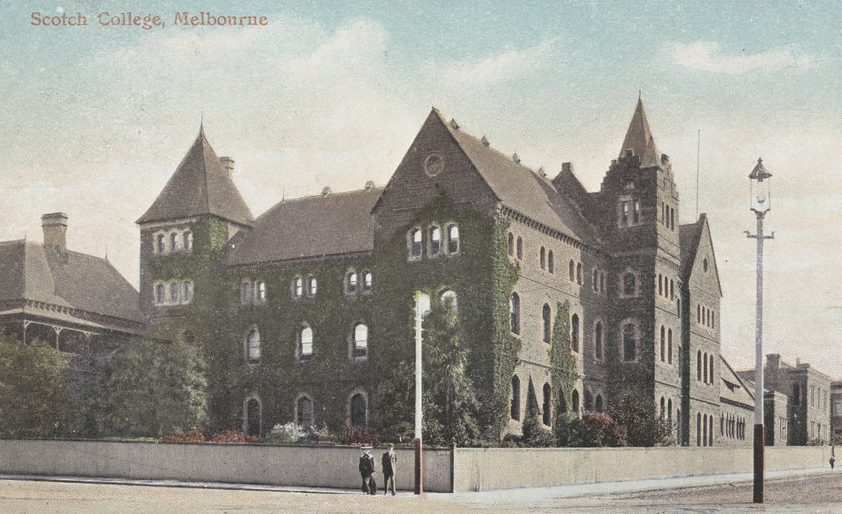
Scotch College at its former East Melbourne site (circa 1906) prior to moving to the current site at Hawthorn

He was educated at Scotch College, Melbourne; which, at the time, was located in East Melbourne.

== Football ==
("nothing in the match was more brilliant that the roving of A. Robinson, who last season played with the Melbourne Club") ("Little Robinson, their rover, the old Scotch Collegian, played a very nice game, and was always effective")

== Death ==
He died at Ballarat on 21 March 1901, after struggling with tuberculosis for several years. He was buried at the cemetery at Creswick, Victoria on 23 March 1901.
