= Bill Stranger =

Australian rules footballer

Personal information
- Full name: William Stranger
- Born: 27 October 1871; Brunswick, Victoria
- Died: 26 February 1945 (aged 73); Parkville, Victoria
- Original team: Albion United
- Height: 180 cm (5 ft 11 in)
- Weight: 82 kg (181 lb)

Playing career^{1}
Years	Club	Games (Goals)
1897–98	Collingwood	17 (2)
- ^{1} Playing statistics correct to the end of 1898.

William Stranger (27 October 1871 – 26 February 1945) was an Australian rules footballer who played with Collingwood in the Victorian Football League (VFL).
