= Richard Wardill =

Australian cricketer

Personal information
- Full name: Richard Wilson Wardill
- Born: 3 November 1840; Everton, Liverpool, Lancashire, England
- Died: 17 August 1873 (aged 32); Melbourne, Australia
- Batting: Right-handed
- Bowling: Right arm medium pace (roundarm)
- Role: Batsman
- Relatives: Benjamin Wardill (brother); Dick Wardill (son)

Domestic team information
- Years: Team
- 1861–73: Victoria
- 1864: G. Anderson's XI

Career statistics
Competition	First-class
Matches	10
Runs scored	381
Batting average	25.40
100s/50s	1/1
Top score	110
Balls bowled	202
Wickets	8
Bowling average	10.50
5 wickets in innings	0
10 wickets in match	0
Best bowling	3/23
Catches/stumpings
- Source: CricketArchive

Richard Wilson Wardill (3 November 1840 – 17 August 1873) was an Australian cricketer who played in ten first-class cricket matches, eight of which were for Victoria.

== Family ==
The son of the stockbroker Joseph Wilson Wardill (1796–1866), and Mary Wardill (1815–1878), née Briddon, Richard Wilson Wardill was born at Everton, Liverpool, England on 3 November 1840. He was the brother of Benjamin Johnston Wardill (1842–1917).

He married Eliza Helena Lovett Cameron (1848–1943), later Mrs. Edward Thomas Tatham, on 18 May 1871. Their son, Richard Cameron Wardill (1872–1929) was born in Melbourne on 5 July 1872.

== Cricket ==
He was the first cricketer to score a century in Australian first-class cricket, when he made 110 and 45 not out in Victoria's victory over New South Wales in 1867–68. Wardill was also an influential player and administrator in the early years of Australian rules football. On Boxing Day 1866 he captained the Melbourne Cricket Club against the Western District Aboriginal cricket team, led by Tom Wills.

Cricket writer Gideon Haigh published an article on Wardill in 1992 titled "The Drowned Bradman".

== Football ==
In between 1859 and 1861 he played a number of games of Australian Rules Football with (pre-VFL) Melbourne, Richmond, and St Kilda.

== Death ==
Wardill committed suicide by drowning himself in the Yarra River on 17 August 1873.

"In 1872-73 Wardill had serious personal problems probably because of speculation in mining shares; he embezzled £7000 from his employers, the Victoria Sugar Co. On 17 August 1873, aged 38, he committed suicide by jumping into the Yarra River…" – Australian Dictionary of Biography.

== See also ==
- List of Victoria first-class cricketers
