= Harry Hughes (Australian footballer) =

Australian rules footballer

Personal information
- Full name: Harry James William Hughes
- Born: 24 May 1876; Windsor, New South Wales
- Died: 5 November 1929 (aged 53); Kew, Victoria
- Original team: Wesley College

Playing career^{1}
Years	Club	Games (Goals)
1897	Melbourne	2 (0)
- ^{1} Playing statistics correct to the end of 1897.

Harry James William Hughes (24 May 1876 – 5 November 1929) was an Australian rules footballer who played with Melbourne in the Victorian Football League (VFL).
