= Norm McLeod (Australian footballer) =

Australian rules footballer

Personal information
- Full name: Norman Robert McLeod
- Born: 13 April 1879; Ballarat, Victoria
- Died: 3 April 1913 (aged 33); Cohuna, Victoria
- Original team: Scotch College

Playing career^{1}
Years	Club	Games (Goals)
1897–98	Melbourne	18 (0)
- ^{1} Playing statistics correct to the end of 1898.

Norman Robert McLeod (13 April 1879 – 3 April 1913) was an Australian rules footballer who played with Melbourne in the Victorian Football League (VFL).

McLeod, a defender, joined Melbourne from Scotch College at the start of the 1897 VFL season and played in 14 of the 17 senior games that season. The following year he made four appearances before being dropped from the team and he did not play senior football again.

He died in April 1913 after being accidentally shot in the head shortly after being appointed as manager of the Union Bank branch in Cohuna.
