= Jack Parkin =

Australian rules footballer

Personal information
- Full name: John Parkin
- Born: 9 June 1877; Kingston, Victoria
- Died: 19 August 1951 (aged 74); Creswick, Victoria
- Original team: Geelong Grammar
- Position: Follower

Playing career^{1}
Years	Club	Games (Goals)
1897–99	Geelong	50 (11)
- ^{1} Playing statistics correct to the end of 1899.

John Parkin (9 June 1877 – 19 August 1951) was an Australian rules footballer who played with Geelong in the Victorian Football League (VFL).
