= Dave Strahan =

Australian rules footballer

Personal information
- Full name: David Strahan
- Born: 21 October 1874; South Melbourne, Victoria
- Died: 4 April 1938 (aged 63); Fitzroy, Victoria
- Original team: Scotch College

Playing career^{1}
Years	Club	Games (Goals)
1897–1900	Melbourne	29 (0)
- ^{1} Playing statistics correct to the end of 1900.

David Strahan (21 October 1874 – 4 April 1938) was an Australian rules footballer who played with Melbourne in the Victorian Football League (VFL).
