= Fred McGinis =

Australian rules footballer

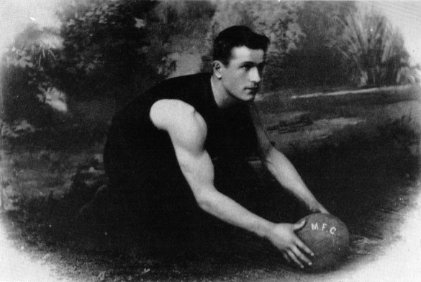

Personal information
- Full name: Alfred Ernest McGinis
- Born: 11 November 1874; Hobart
- Died: 30 March 1953 (aged 78); Hobart
- Original team: City (Hobart)
- Height: 175 cm (5 ft 9 in)
- Weight: 74 kg (163 lb)

Playing career^{1}
Years	Club	Games (Goals)
1894–1896	Melbourne (VFA)	45 (41)
1897–1901	Melbourne	84 (36)
- ^{1} Playing statistics correct to the end of 1901.

Career highlights
- VFL premiership player: 1900; Melbourne leading goalkicker: 1895; Melbourne Hall of Fame

Fred McGinis (11 November 1874 – 30 March 1953) was an Australian rules footballer. He played for the Melbourne Football Club in the Victorian Football Association (VFA), and the Victorian Football League (VFL).

== Family ==
The son of Louis McGuiness (1841-1908), and Mary Ann McGuiness (1840-1911), née Toogood, Alfred Ernest McGuiness was born at Hobart, on 11 November 1874.

== Football ==
McGinis began his career with Melbourne at the age of nineteen, in 1894 in the VFA, and was its leading goalkicker in 1895. In September 1895, 'Half Back' (the Age's football correspondent) declared that McGinis was "the champion of the season.

A rover, he starred for Melbourne in its debut season in the VFL in 1897, and he was a premiership player with Melbourne in 1900.

== Vision difficulties ==
Vision difficulties forced him out of the game by 1902 and he returned to Tasmania.

=== Benefit matches ===
As he neared total blindness, a match was played for his benefit between combined teams from the VFA and VFL on 4 September 1902; the match, won by the VFL, raised £200. The match was the first time that the two bitter rival football competitions had ever played against each other.

== Death ==
He died in Hobart on 30 March 1953, and was cremated at the Cornelian Bay Cemetery the next day.

== Hall of Fame ==
McGinis was regarded as one of the best players of his era, with some contemporaries, including Mick Grace, Jack Leith, George Cathie, and the Argus sportswriter 'Observer' naming him as the best overall.

Although primarily a rover, he could play and succeed at any position on the ground, and was proficient at all skills: accurate kicking, high marking, speed and endurance.

In all my experience I have never seen a more accomplished player – one qualified to rank on the highest rung of the ladder of fame among the football champions of Australia. His scintillating brilliancy on the field was unfortunately cut short at the height of his fame by failing eye-sight. (George Cathie, 1943).

McGinis is the first listed inductee in the Tasmanian Football Hall of Fame, his citation describing him as "Tasmania's first true football superstar".

== See also ==
- The Footballers' Alphabet
