= Harry Dowdall =

Australian rules footballer

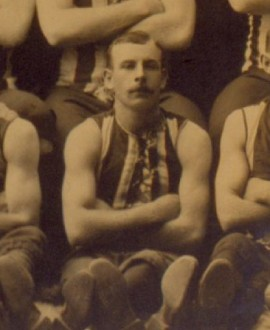
- Dowdall in 1896 during his Collingwood VFA career

Personal information
- Full name: Henry Arthur Dowdall
- Born: 24 June 1872; Emerald Hill, Victoria
- Died: 9 May 1912 (aged 39); Collingwood
- Original team: South Melbourne

Playing career^{1}
Years	Club	Games (Goals)
1892–1896	Collingwood (VFA)	74 (19)
1897-1900	Collingwood	38 (21)
1901	St Kilda	1 (0)
Total		113 (40)
- ^{1} Playing statistics correct to the end of 1901.

Career highlights
- 1896 VFA premiership player

Henry Arthur Dowdall (29 June 1872 – 9 May 1912) was an Australian rules footballer who played for Collingwood in the 1897 inaugural Victorian Football League (VFL) season.

== Family ==
The son of James Dowdall and Isabella McGowan, Harry was small of stature and lightly built, and used these traits to his advantage, particularly in wet weather.

== Football ==
Harry's older brother Jim had both previously played for South Melbourne in the Victorian Football Association (VFA) from 1887, with Harry playing in the 2nd Twenty. In 1892 they both tried to move to Collingwood. Jim was unsuccessful and instead played for Richmond.

In Collingwood's final game of the 1897 VFL season, Harry refused to play unless he was allowed to play on the ball for the entirety of the game. Although not pleasing Collingwood officials with his stance, he remained at the club for a further three seasons, playing 38 games and kicking 21 goals, before crossing to St Kilda in 1901 at the age of 29, where he played only one game.
