= Benjamin Wardill =

Australian cricketer

Ben Wardill
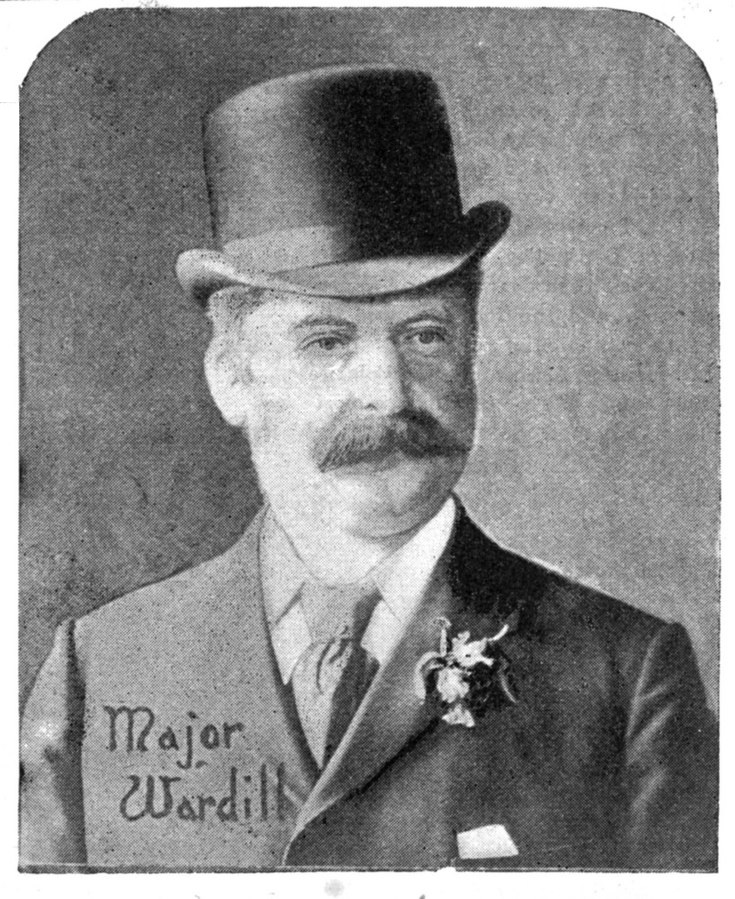
- Wardill in 1895

Personal information
- Full name: Benjamin Johnston Wardill
- Born: 15 October 1842; Everton, Liverpool, England
- Died: 15 October 1917 (aged 75); Sandringham, Victoria, Australia

Domestic team information
- Years: Team
- 1866: Victoria
- Source: Cricinfo, 3 May 2015

Benjamin Wardill (15 October 1842 – 15 October 1917), often referred to as Major Wardill, was an Australian cricketer and cricket administrator. Wardill played two first-class cricket matches: one for Victoria in 1866, and one 20 years later for the Australians in England in 1886. His brother Richard also played cricket for Victoria.

Born in England, Wardill migrated to Melbourne in 1861 and worked for several years with his brother Richard at the office of the Victoria Sugar Co. He joined the garrison artillery soon after his arrival, and rose to the rank of major in the Harbor Trust Garrison Battery in 1885.

Wardill was secretary of Melbourne Cricket Club from 1876 to 1911. In his time the membership of the club increased from 572 to 5353. A biographer said that "Wardill was largely successful in his aim to make the Melbourne Cricket Club the Australian counterpart of the famous Marylebone Cricket Club in England". His salary was raised to 700 pounds per annum in 1907, having been 600 pounds per annum for the previous 16 years.

In his role as Melbourne Cricket Club secretary, Wardill organised and managed Australia's tours to England in 1886, 1899 and 1902.

Wardill died of heart disease in 1917. He married once, to Elizabeth King, and had one daughter who died in infancy.

== See also ==
- List of Victoria first-class cricketers
