= Joe Hogan (footballer, born 1875) =

Australian rules footballer (1875–1943)

Personal information
- Full name: Joseph Daniel Hogan
- Born: 17 November 1875; St Kilda, Victoria
- Died: 21 December 1943 (aged 68); St Kilda, Victoria
- Original team: Collegians (MJFA)
- Height: 179 cm (5 ft 10 in)
- Weight: 80 kg (176 lb)
- Position: Centre half-back

Playing career^{1}
Years	Club	Games (Goals)
1895–96	St Kilda (VFA)	34 (4)
1897–00, 1902–06	St Kilda (VFL)	91 (11)
Total		125 (15)
- ^{1} Playing statistics correct to the end of 1906.

Career highlights
- Captain 1902

Joseph Daniel Hogan (17 November 1875 – 21 December 1943) was an Australian rules footballer who played with St Kilda in both the Victorian Football Association (VFA) and the Victorian Football League (VFL).

== Family ==
The son of merchant James Hogan (1831-1917), and Mary Hogan (-1900), née Thompson, Joseph Daniel Hogan was born at St Kilda on 17 November 1875.

He never married.

== Education ==
Amongst those who took "Honors" and secured degrees
at the annual "Commencement" of the Melbourne University
on Saturday was Mr. Joseph Daniel Hogan, younger eon of
Mr. James Hogan, of Hogan, Mooney and Co., Wine and
Spirit Merchants. This young gentleman has had a remark-
ably brilliant University career. Matriculating at the age of
twelve, he has passed through his various law courses
without the slightest trouble. He won the Supreme Court
Prize of 125 guineas, and qualified for admission to praotise
last December. On Saturday he took his degrees as Master
of Arts and Bachelor of Laws, and secured the University
prize of 60 guineas in the final honor examination in Law.
We congratulate Mr. Hogan upon his distinguished success,
and trust his future oareer at the "bar" will be equally as brilliant.
The Sportsman, 23 March 1897.

He was educated at Christian Brothers College, St Kilda, and at the University of Melbourne, graduating Bachelor of Arts (B.A.) on 16 March 1985, Master of Arts (M.A.) and Bachelor of Laws (LL.B.) on 20 March 1897, and Master of Laws (LL.M.) on 16 March 1899.

== Football ==
Recruited from the Metropolitan Junior Football Association (MJFA) team "Collegians", Hogan was a centre half-back, regarded as one of the finest St Kilda players in their early VFL years, a period where the club was little more than a chopping block. In his career, St Kilda won 22 and drew 2 of the 125 matches he played in (18.4% success rate).

Due to the demands of his law practice he played just six matches in 1899–1900, and missed the entire 1901 season.

He was appointed captain in 1902, but the club lost all 17 matches that season.

Hogan was a ruckman and key position player, and upon his retirement was described by H. C. A. Harrison as one of the game's greatest players, particularly skilled for his high marking and ruck work.

=== Last match of 1904 ===
Late in the final quarter — in what he thought (at the time) was to be his last match for St Kilda — playing against Carlton on an extremely windy day at Princes Park on 3 September 1904, when Carlton was so far in front that a loss was impossible, Hogan (one of St Kilda's best players on the day) took the ball from the backline and, moving down the ground, ran towards the St Kilda goal.

Carlton ruckman Fred Elliott, well aware that it was Hogan's last game, moved out of Hogan's way, allowing Hogan a free passage to the goals. Elliott was so eager to assist Hogan that he shouldered a team-mate, the Carlton half-back Billy Leeds, out of the way.

Hogan, now free to progress goalwards, got in range, and completely unimpeded, kicked for goal, but only managed a behind.

== Legal career ==
He was admitted to practise as a barrister and solicitor on 3 May 1897, and for 45 years he worked in joint partnership with his brother, James Thompson Hogan (1873-1944), at Hogan and Hogan of Queen Street, Melbourne.

== Death ==
He died in a St Kilda private hospital on 21 December 1943, and was buried at the St Kilda Cemetery.

== See also ==
- The Footballers' Alphabet
