= Fred White (Australian footballer) =

Australian rules footballer

Personal information
- Full name: Frederick John White
- Born: 6 May 1877; Geelong, Victoria
- Died: 10 August 1907 (aged 30); Geelong, Victoria

Playing career^{1}
Years	Club	Games (Goals)
1897–99	Geelong	28 (28)
- ^{1} Playing statistics correct to the end of 1899.

Frederick John White (6 May 1877 – 10 August 1907) was an Australian rules footballer who played with Geelong in the Victorian Football League (VFL).
