= George Stuckey =

Australian rules footballer (1871–1932)

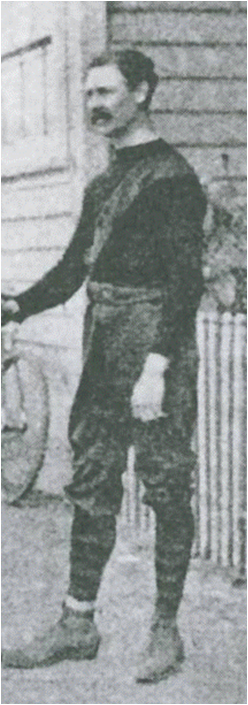

Personal information
- Full name: George Stuckey
- Born: 6 July 1871; Walhalla, Victoria
- Died: 15 March 1932 (aged 60); North Melbourne, Victoria
- Original team: Essendon (VFA)
- Positions: Wing, half back

Playing career^{1}
Years	Club	Games (Goals)
1893–1897	Essendon (VFA)	61 (8)
1897–1902	Essendon	71 (4)
Total		132 (12)

Representative team honours^{2}
Years	Team	Games (Goals)
1899–1900	Victoria	
- ^{1} Playing statistics correct to the end of 1902.^{2} Representative statistics correct as of 1900.

Career highlights
- 2 × VFA premiership player 1893–1894; 2 × VFL premiership player: 1897, 1901

George Stuckey (6 July 1871 – 15 March 1932) was an Australian rules footballer who played with and captained the Essendon Football Club in the Victorian Football League (VFL).

== Football ==
Stuckey played as both a wingman and half back during his career in the VFA and VFL and was the first captain of Essendon in the VFL; and, when Essendon won the (inaugural) VFL premiership in 1897, he also became the first VFL premiership captain. He remained captain until the end of the 1900 season and was a premiership player again in 1901. During his career, he represented Victoria at interstate football.

== Cricket ==
A talented sportsman, in addition to his football career, Stuckey also played first-class cricket for Victoria.

== Athlete ==
In 1897 (the year he captained Essendon to its first VFL premiership), he won the 130-yard Stawell Gift, in 12.2 seconds, off a handicap of 12 yards.

== Family ==
His brother, Harry, was also a prominent cricket player for Victoria.

== Honours ==
In 2010, Stuckey was inducted into the Essendon Hall of Fame.

== See also ==
- List of Victoria first-class cricketers
- The Footballers' Alphabet
