= Jack Leith =

Australian rules footballer (1872–1935)

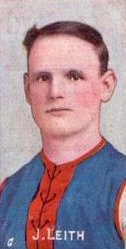

Personal information
- Full name: John Goodwin Leith
- Born: 12 August 1872; Ballan, Victoria
- Died: 24 April 1935 (aged 62); Northcote, Victoria
- Original team: Carlton (VFA)

Playing career^{1}
Years	Club	Games (Goals)
1892–95	Carlton (VFA)	49 (24)
1896	Melbourne (VFA)	16 (28)
1897–1908, 1911–12	Melbourne	133 (162)
- ^{1} Playing statistics correct to the end of 1912.

Career highlights
- VFL premiership player: 1900; VFL Leading Goalkicker: 1897; 5× Melbourne leading goalkicker: 1896, 1897, 1899, 1902, 1907

John Goodwin Leith (12 August 1872 – 24 April 1935) was an Australian rules footballer who played for the Melbourne Football Club in the early years of the Victorian Football League (VFL).

Leith was a forward and prior to joining Melbourne in the last Victorian Football Association (VFA) season in 1896 played with Carlton. He was a centre half forward in Melbourne's 1900 premiership team and topped the club's goalkicking on five occasions in his career: 1896, 1897, 1899, 1902 and 1907. When having a set shot at goal he used the place kick and once, in a game against St Kilda, kicked five goals from place kicks. He retired at the end of the 1908 season but returned to the league in 1911 when Melbourne were struggling, this time playing as a defender.
