= Charles Coles (footballer) =

Australian rules footballer

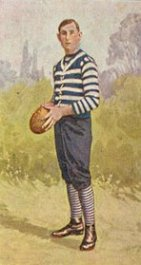

Personal information
- Full name: Charles John Clarke Coles
- Nickname: Dummy
- Born: 26 December 1878; Geelong, Victoria
- Died: 20 August 1942 (aged 63); Geelong, Victoria
- Original team: Chilwell
- Height: 183 cm (6 ft 0 in)
- Weight: 83 kg (183 lb)
- Position: Follower

Playing career^{1}
Years	Club	Games (Goals)
1897–1904	Geelong	72 (81)
- ^{1} Playing statistics correct to the end of 1904.

Charles John Clarke Coles (26 December 1878 – 20 August 1942) was an Australian rules footballer who played with the Geelong Football Club in the Victorian Football League (VFL). He was a skilled follower with a nice kick. However, his career was ruined through a broken leg in 1904. He died in 1942 after being struck on the chin while acting as a doorkeeper at the Palais Royal Dance Hall in Geelong.
