= Dick Wardill =

Australian rules footballer

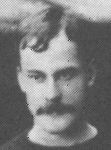

Personal information
- Full name: Richard Cameron Wardill
- Born: 5 July 1872; Melbourne
- Died: 28 August 1929 (aged 57); Ripponlea, Victoria
- Original team: Alberton

Playing career^{1}
Years	Club	Games (Goals)
1897–1902	Melbourne	60 (37)
- ^{1} Playing statistics correct to the end of 1902.

Career highlights
- VFL premiership player: 1900; Melbourne captain: 1900

Richard Cameron Wardill (5 July 1872 – 28 August 1929) was an Australian rules footballer and coach who played for the Melbourne Football Club in the Victorian Football League (VFL).

== Family ==
The son of Richard Wilson Wardill (1840-1873) — the brother of Benjamin Johnston Wardill (1842-1917)— and Eliza Helena Lovett Wardill (1848-1943), née Cameron, later Mrs. Edward Thomas Tatham, Richard Cameron Wardill was born in Melbourne on 5 July 1872.

=== Marriage ===
He married Dorothy Elspeth Wilson (1880-1952), at Mosman, New South Wales, on 17 December 1909.

They had four children: Elspeth Margaret Wardill (1912-2001), later Mrs. Donald Hastings Bennett, Richard David Wardill (1916-2003), Diana Mary Wardill (1920-2003), later Mrs. Godfrey Robert Donaldson, and Dorothy Wardill (b.1914, who only lived for 8 days).

=== Father's suicide ===
"In 1872-73 [Richard Wilson] Wardill had serious personal problems probably because of speculation in mining shares; he embezzled £7000 from his employers, the Victoria Sugar Co. On 17 August 1873, aged 38, he committed suicide by jumping into the Yarra River…" — Australian Dictionary of Biography.

== Education ==
He attended Caulfield Grammar School (as did his Melbourne team-mate Frank Langley) from 1886 to 1888.

== Football ==
=== Melbourne (VFA) ===
Playing as a ruckman, and recruited from the Alberton Football Club (one of the foundation clubs of the Metropolitan Junior Football Association), he played for Melbourne's VFA side for four years (1893-1896).

=== Melbourne (VFL) ===
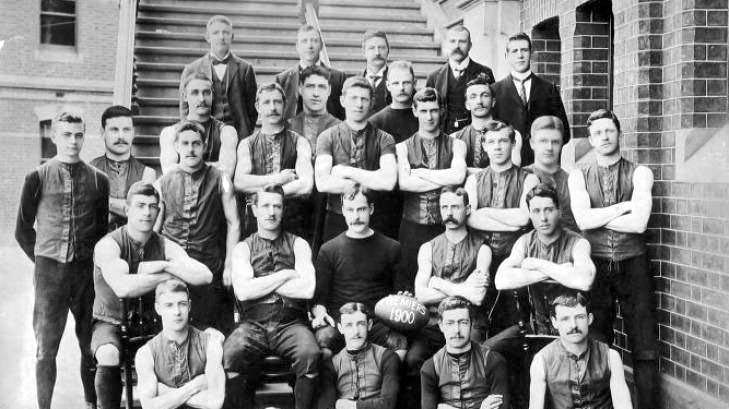
Melbourne team, 1900 premiers

He played in 60 matches for Melbourne in the VFL (1897-1902); and was captain of the team that beat Fitzroy in Melbourne's first ever premiership: the 1900 Grand Final against Fitzroy, at the East Melbourne Cricket Ground, on 22 September 1900.

One of the best players for Melbourne on the day, Wardill (who had "work[ed] like a lion") was carried off the ground shoulder-high by his team-mates at the end of the match.

The feature of the finals has undoubtedly been the electrifying play of the Melbourne captain, Wardill, who in the last two matchies fairly excelled himself. Never has an athlete more brilliantly risen to thie occasion, and he not only played superbly, but displayed improvement in the management of his team which was simply astounding, for it must he confessed that in some of the matches towards the end of the first round [of home-and-away matches], the Melbourne skipper seemed to dispose his forces badly, but possibly when one comes to think it over, there was more method in his system than he was credited with. At any rate, it must he remembered that in matches which have no significance all sorts of experiments may be tried with impunity.
. . .
After the [half-time] interval the game was resumed at a terrific pace, full steam ahead being the order of the day on both sides. It was a veritable battle of giants, and never in the 40 years' history of the Victorian game has a grander exposition of football been witnessed. The Melbourne captain, Dick Wardill, rivalled his royal namesake on Bosworth field by enacting wonders, and unlike the other Richard referred to, he deserved and achieved success. Wardill's superb play seemed to exercise a magnetic influence upon every man in his team, and so irresistible was the force of Melbourne's splendidly concerted game that in the third quarter Fitzroy, although striving gallantly and untiringly, never once passed their opponents' goal line, while Melourne, adding 2.3 to nil, wound up the quarter with a lead of 13 points. — The Leader, 29 September 1900.

In 1901, when it was thought that he had retired, the eminent footballer, coach, and sports journalist, Jack Worrall, observed that Wardill "was one of the most brilliant exponents the game has seen".

=== Representative team (VFL) ===
In June 1900 he was a member of the VFL's representative team that played a match against a combined Ballarat team.

== Death ==
He died at Elsternwick after jumping in front of a train on 28 August 1929.

Richard C. Wardill, aged about 50 years, of Dudley street, Brighton, was killed by an electric train between Ripponlea and Elsternwick yesterday afternoon. The motor-man of the 3.30 pm. train from Flinders street to Sandringham reported that when the train was about to pass under the Hotham street footbridge a man jumped from the embankment and fell in front of the last carriage. He was cut to pieces before the train could be stopped.
It is understood that Mrs Wardill is visiting Sydney to undergo an operation. — The Argus, 29 August 1929.

Given the circumstances of his father's own suicide, it is significant that the newspaper reports of the time stressed that he was "without any financial or other worry", but "was passing through a period of mental depression" at the time of his suicide.

== See also ==
- List of Caulfield Grammar School people
- The Footballers' Alphabet
