= 1897 VFL season =

Inaugural season of the Victorian Football League (VFL)

1897 VFL premiership season
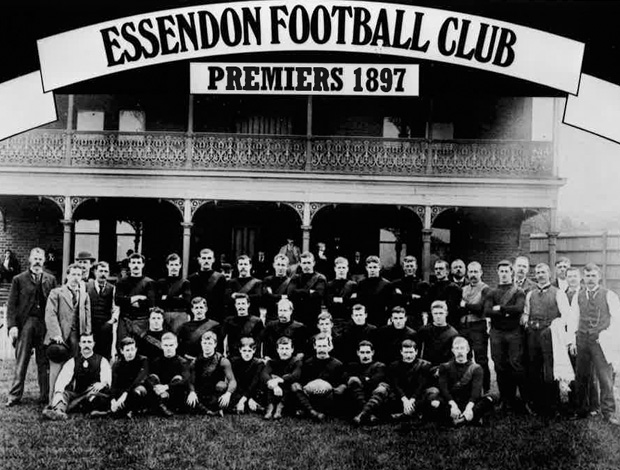
- Essendon 1897 VFL premiership team
- Date: 8 May – 4 September 1897
- Teams: 8
- Premiers: Essendon; 1st premiership
- Runners-up: Geelong; 1st runners-up result
- Minor premiers: Geelong; 1st minor premiership
- Leading goalkicker medallist: Eddy James (Geelong); Jack Leith (Melbourne); 22 goals
- Matches played: 62

The 1897 VFL season was the inaugural season of the Victorian Football League (VFL), the highest-level senior Australian rules football competition in Victoria. The season ran from 8 May to 4 September, comprising a 14-round home-and-away season followed by a three-week finals series featuring the top four clubs. Eight Victorian Football Association (VFA) clubs – Carlton, Collingwood, Essendon, Fitzroy, Geelong, Melbourne, South Melbourne and St Kilda – featured in the inaugural season after seceding from the VFA in 1896.

Essendon won the inaugural premiership after winning all three of its finals matches, with Geelong finishing as runners-up with two wins. Geelong won the minor premiership by finishing atop the home-and-away ladder with an 11–3 win–loss record. Geelong's Eddy James and Melbourne's Jack Leith tied for the leading goalkicker medal as the league's leading goalkickers.

== Background ==
In 1897, the VFL competition consisted of eight teams of 20 on-the-field players each, with no "reserves" (although any of the 20 players who had left the playing field for any reason could later resume their place on the field at any time during the match). Each team played each other twice in a home-and-away season of 14 rounds.

Once the 14-round home-and-away season had finished, the 1897 VFL Premiers were determined according to the conditions dictated by the specific format and conventions of the 1897 Finals System, which was used in this season only.

== Home-and-away season ==
=== Round 1 ===
	Round 1
Saturday, 8 May (3:00 pm)	Fitzroy 6.13 (49)	def.	Carlton 2.4 (16)	Brunswick Street Oval	Statistics
Saturday, 8 May (3:00 pm)	Collingwood 5.11 (41)	def.	St Kilda 2.4 (16)	Victoria Park	Statistics
Saturday, 8 May (3:00 pm)	Geelong 3.6 (24)	def. by	Essendon 7.5 (47)	Corio Oval	Statistics
Saturday, 8 May (3:00 pm)	South Melbourne 3.9 (27)	def. by	Melbourne 6.8 (44)	Lake Oval	Statistics

=== Round 2 ===
	Round 2
Saturday, 15 May (3:00 pm)	South Melbourne 6.4 (40)	def.	Carlton 5.6 (36)	Lake Oval	Statistics
Saturday, 15 May (3:00 pm)	Essendon 4.6 (30)	def. by	Collingwood 8.2 (50)	East Melbourne Cricket Ground	Statistics
Saturday, 15 May (3:00 pm)	St Kilda 3.8 (26)	def. by	Fitzroy 10.6 (66)	Junction Oval	Statistics
Saturday, 15 May (3:00 pm)	Melbourne 9.10 (64)	def.	Geelong 3.1 (19)	Melbourne Cricket Ground	Statistics

=== Round 3 ===
	Round 3
Saturday, 22 May (3:00 pm)	Collingwood 6.5 (41)	def.	Geelong 5.7 (37)	Victoria Park	Statistics
Saturday, 22 May (3:00 pm)	Fitzroy 5.9 (39)	def. by	Melbourne 7.8 (50)	Brunswick Street Oval	Statistics
Monday, 24 May (3:00 pm)	Essendon 12.6 (78)	def.	Carlton 6.5 (41)	East Melbourne Cricket Ground	Statistics
Monday, 24 May (3:00 pm)	South Melbourne 8.11 (59)	def.	St Kilda 0.2 (2)	Lake Oval	Statistics

=== Round 4 ===
	Round 4
Saturday, 29 May (3:00 pm)	Geelong 5.14 (44)	def.	Carlton 3.4 (22)	Corio Oval	Statistics
Saturday, 29 May (3:00 pm)	South Melbourne 5.11 (41)	def.	Collingwood 5.3 (33)	Lake Oval	Statistics
Saturday, 29 May (3:00 pm)	Fitzroy 2.8 (20)	def. by	Essendon 6.6 (42)	Brunswick Street Oval	Statistics
Saturday, 29 May (3:00 pm)	Melbourne 11.10 (76)	def.	St Kilda 7.4 (46)	Melbourne Cricket Ground	Statistics

=== Round 5 ===
	Round 5
Saturday, 5 June (3:00 pm)	Melbourne 15.17 (107)	def.	Carlton 3.8 (26)	Melbourne Cricket Ground	Statistics
Saturday, 5 June (3:00 pm)	Collingwood 5.7 (37)	def.	Fitzroy 2.9 (21)	Victoria Park	Statistics
Saturday, 5 June (3:00 pm)	St Kilda 3.8 (26)	def. by	Essendon 9.9 (63)	Junction Oval	Statistics
Saturday, 5 June (3:00 pm)	Geelong 10.12 (72)	def.	South Melbourne 3.6 (24)	Corio Oval	Statistics

=== Round 6 ===
	Round 6
Saturday, 19 June (3:00 pm)	St Kilda 3.6 (24)	def. by	Carlton 5.5 (35)	Junction Oval	Statistics
Saturday, 19 June (3:00 pm)	Melbourne 5.3 (33)	def.	Collingwood 3.8 (26)	Melbourne Cricket Ground	Statistics
Saturday, 19 June (3:00 pm)	South Melbourne 2.4 (16)	def. by	Essendon 1.13 (19)	Lake Oval	Statistics
Saturday, 19 June (3:00 pm)	Geelong 3.13 (31)	def.	Fitzroy 2.3 (15)	Corio Oval	Statistics

=== Round 7 ===
	Round 7
Tuesday, 22 June (3:00 pm)	Carlton 5.5 (35)	def. by	Collingwood 6.5 (41)	Princes Park	Statistics
Tuesday, 22 June (3:00 pm)	Essendon 8.15 (63)	def.	Melbourne 3.9 (27)	East Melbourne Cricket Ground	Statistics
Tuesday, 22 June (3:00 pm)	Fitzroy 5.13 (43)	drew with	South Melbourne 5.13 (43)	Brunswick Street Oval	Statistics
Tuesday, 22 June (3:00 pm)	St Kilda 4.7 (31)	def. by	Geelong 16.18 (114)	Junction Oval	Statistics

=== Round 8 ===
	Round 8
Saturday, 26 June (3:00 pm)	Carlton 1.3 (9)	def. by	Fitzroy 5.17 (47)	Princes Park	Statistics
Saturday, 26 June (3:00 pm)	St Kilda 4.5 (29)	def. by	Collingwood 7.11 (53)	Junction Oval	Statistics
Saturday, 26 June (3;00 pm)	Essendon 5.2 (32)	def. by	Geelong 8.9 (57)	East Melbourne Cricket Ground	Statistics
Saturday, 26 June (3:00 pm)	Melbourne 3.2 (20)	def. by	South Melbourne 11.7 (73)	Melbourne Cricket Ground	Statistics

=== Round 9 ===
	Round 9
Saturday, 3 July (3:00 pm)	Carlton 4.4 (28)	def. by	South Melbourne 11.8 (74)	Princes Park	Statistics
Saturday, 3 July (3:00 pm)	Collingwood 5.7 (37)	def. by	Essendon 6.10 (46)	Victoria Park	Statistics
Saturday, 3 July (3:00 pm)	Fitzroy 9.21 (75)	def.	St Kilda 2.6 (18)	Brunswick Street Oval	Statistics
Saturday, 3 July (3:00 pm)	Geelong 1.9 (15)	def.	Melbourne 0.10 (10)	Corio Oval	Statistics

=== Round 10 ===
	Round 10
Saturday, 10 July (3:00 pm)	Carlton 2.1 (13)	def. by	Essendon 5.12 (42)	Princes Park	Statistics
Saturday, 10 July (3:00 pm)	Geelong 7.10 (52)	def.	Collingwood 1.4 (10)	Corio Oval	Statistics
Saturday, 10 July (3:00 pm)	Melbourne 8.5 (53)	def.	Fitzroy 3.8 (26)	Melbourne Cricket Ground	Statistics
Saturday, 10 July (3:00 pm)	St Kilda 0.3 (3)	def. by	South Melbourne 8.16 (64)	Junction Oval	Statistics

=== Round 11 ===
	Round 11
Saturday, 17 July (3:00 pm)	Carlton 2.4 (16)	def. by	Geelong 9.12 (66)	Princes Park	Statistics
Saturday, 17 July (3:00 pm)	Collingwood 0.8 (8)	def. by	South Melbourne 2.15 (27)	Victoria Park	Statistics
Saturday, 17 July (3:00 pm)	Essendon 9.8 (62)	def.	Fitzroy 4.6 (30)	East Melbourne Cricket Ground	Statistics
Saturday, 17 July (3:00 pm)	St Kilda 1.7 (13)	def. by	Melbourne 10.11 (71)	Junction Oval	Statistics

=== Round 12 ===
	Round 12
Saturday, 24 July (3:00 pm)	Carlton 2.6 (18)	def. by	Melbourne 5.16 (46)	Melbourne Cricket Ground	Statistics
Saturday, 24 July (3:00 pm)	Fitzroy 4.4 (28)	def. by	Collingwood 3.17 (35)	Brunswick Street Oval	Statistics
Saturday, 24 July (3:00 pm)	Essendon 13.16 (94)	def.	St Kilda 0.3 (3)	East Melbourne Cricket Ground	Statistics
Saturday, 24 July (3:00 pm)	South Melbourne 5.2 (32)	def. by	Geelong 6.8 (44)	Lake Oval	Statistics

=== Round 13 ===
	Round 13
Saturday, 31 July (3:00 pm)	Carlton 8.11 (59)	def.	St Kilda 3.7 (25)	Princes Park	Statistics
Saturday, 31 July (3:00 pm)	Collingwood 5.13 (43)	def.	Melbourne 3.10 (28)	Victoria Park	Statistics
Saturday, 31 July (3:00 pm)	Essendon 8.1 (49)	def.	South Melbourne 6.9 (45)	East Melbourne Cricket Ground	Statistics
Saturday, 31 July (3:00 pm)	Fitzroy 2.9 (21)	def. by	Geelong 5.3 (33)	Brunswick Street Oval	Statistics

=== Round 14 ===
	Round 14
Saturday, 7 August (3:00 pm)	Collingwood 7.12 (54)	def.	Carlton 3.4 (22)	Victoria Park	Statistics
Saturday, 7 August (3:00 pm)	Melbourne 8.8 (56)	def.	Essendon 6.3 (39)	Melbourne Cricket Ground	Statistics
Saturday, 7 August (3:00 pm)	South Melbourne 3.12 (30)	def.	Fitzroy 4.5 (29)	Lake Oval	Statistics
Saturday, 7 August (3:00 pm)	Geelong 14.12 (96)	def.	St Kilda 3.0 (18)	Corio Oval	Statistics

== Ladder ==
(P)	Premiers
	Qualified for finals

#	Team	P	W	L	D	PF	PA	%	Pts
1	Geelong	14	11	3	0	704	383	183.8	44
2	Essendon (P)	14	11	3	0	706	445	158.7	44
3	Melbourne	14	10	4	0	685	473	144.8	40
4	Collingwood	14	9	5	0	509	445	114.4	36
5	South Melbourne	14	8	5	1	595	430	138.4	34
6	Fitzroy	14	4	9	1	509	485	104.9	18
7	Carlton	14	2	12	0	376	737	51.0	8
8	St Kilda	14	0	14	0	280	966	29.0	0

Rules for classification: 1. premiership points; 2. percentage; 3. points for
Average score: 39.0
Source: AFL Tables

== Progression by round ==
4	Finished the round in first place	0	Finished the round in last place
4	Won the minor premiership	0	Finished the season in last place
4	Finished the round inside the top four		
4_{1}	Subscript indicates the ladder position at the end of the round		

Team	1	2	3	4	5	6	7	8	9	10	11	12	13	14
Geelong	0_{6}	0_{8}	0_{7}	4_{6}	8_{6}	12_{4}	16_{4}	20_{4}	24_{2}	28_{2}	32_{2}	36_{2}	40_{2}	44_{1}
Essendon	4_{3}	4_{4}	8_{5}	12_{2}	16_{2}	20_{2}	24_{1}	24_{1}	28_{1}	32_{1}	36_{1}	40_{1}	44_{1}	44_{2}
Melbourne	4_{4}	8_{2}	12_{1}	16_{1}	20_{1}	24_{1}	24_{2}	24_{3}	24_{3}	28_{3}	32_{3}	36_{3}	36_{3}	40_{3}
Collingwood	4_{2}	8_{3}	12_{2}	12_{4}	16_{3}	16_{3}	20_{3}	24_{2}	24_{4}	24_{5}	24_{5}	28_{5}	32_{4}	36_{4}
South Melbourne	0_{5}	4_{5}	8_{4}	12_{3}	12_{4}	12_{5}	14_{5}	18_{5}	22_{5}	26_{4}	30_{4}	30_{4}	30_{5}	34_{5}
Fitzroy	4_{1}	8_{1}	8_{3}	8_{5}	8_{5}	8_{6}	10_{6}	14_{6}	18_{6}	18_{6}	18_{6}	18_{6}	18_{6}	18_{6}
Carlton	0_{8}	0_{6}	0_{6}	0_{7}	0_{7}	4_{7}	4_{7}	4_{7}	4_{7}	4_{7}	4_{7}	4_{7}	8_{7}	8_{7}
St Kilda	0_{7}	0_{7}	0_{8}	0_{8}	0_{8}	0_{8}	0_{8}	0_{8}	0_{8}	0_{8}	0_{8}	0_{8}	0_{8}	0_{8}

Source: AFL Tables

== Finals series ==
=== Finals week 1 ===
	Finals week 1
Saturday, 21 August (2:30 pm)	Geelong 3.11 (29)	def. by	Essendon 5.5 (35)	Corio Oval (crowd: 5,000)	Report; Stats
Saturday, 21 August (2:30 pm)	Melbourne 7.5 (47)	def. by	Collingwood 7.9 (51)	Melbourne Cricket Ground (crowd: 7,000)	Report; Stats

=== Finals week 2 ===
	Finals week 2
Saturday, 28 August (2:30 pm)	Essendon 9.16 (70)	def.	Collingwood 4.6 (30)	Melbourne Cricket Ground (crowd: 8,000)	Report; Stats
Saturday, 28 August (2:30 pm)	Geelong 5.16 (46)	def.	Melbourne 5.7 (37)	Brunswick Street Oval (crowd: 4,000)	Report; Stats

=== Finals week 3 ===
	Finals week 3
Saturday, 4 September (2:30 pm)	Essendon 1.8 (14)	def.	Melbourne 0.8 (8)	Lake Oval (crowd: 3,800)	Report; Stats
Saturday, 4 September (2:30 pm)	Geelong 8.4 (52)	def.	Collingwood 6.12 (48)	East Melbourne Cricket Ground (crowd: 3,000)	Report; Stats

== Finals ladder ==
Won the premiership

#	Team	P	W	L	D	PF	PA	%	Pts
1	Essendon	3	3	0	0	119	67	177.6	12
2	Geelong	3	2	1	0	127	120	105.8	8
3	Collingwood	3	1	2	0	129	169	76.3	4
4	Melbourne	3	0	3	0	92	111	82.9	0

Rules for classification: 1. premiership points; 2. percentage; 3. points for
Source: AFL Tables

== Win–loss table ==
The following table can be sorted from biggest winning margin to biggest losing margin for each round. If two or more matches in a round are decided by the same margin, these margins are sorted by percentage (i.e. the lowest-scoring winning team is ranked highest and the lowest-scoring losing team is ranked lowest). Opponents are listed above the margins and home matches are in bold.

+	Win	Qualified for finals
−	Loss	Eliminated
	Draw	

Team	Home-and-away season														Ladder	Finals series			Finals ladder
Team	1	2	3	4	5	6	7	8	9	10	11	12	13	14	Ladder	F1	F2	F3	Finals ladder
Carlton	FIT −33	SM −4	ESS −37	GEE −22	MEL −81	STK +11	**COL** **−6**	**FIT** **−38**	**SM** **−46**	**ESS** **−29**	**GEE** **−50**	**MEL** **−28**	**STK** **+34**	COL −32	7 (2–12–0)				
Collingwood	**STK** **+25**	ESS +20	**GEE** **+4**	SM −8	**FIT** **+16**	MEL −7	CAR +6	STK +24	**ESS** **−9**	GEE −42	**SM** **−19**	FIT +7	**MEL** **+15**	**CAR** **+32**	4 (9–5–0)	MEL +4	ESS −40	GEE −4	3 (1–2–0)
Essendon	GEE +23	**COL** **−20**	**CAR** **+37**	FIT +22	STK +37	SM +3	**MEL** **+36**	**GEE** **−25**	COL +9	CAR +29	**FIT** **+32**	**STK** **+91**	**SM** **+4**	MEL −17	2 (11–3–0)	GEE +6	**COL** **+40**	**MEL** **+6**	**1** **(3–0–0)**
Fitzroy	**CAR** **+33**	STK +40	**MEL** **−11**	**ESS** **−22**	COL −16	GEE −16	**SM**; **0**	CAR +38	**STK** **+57**	MEL −27	ESS −32	**COL** **−7**	**GEE** **−12**	SM −1	6 (4–9–1)				
Geelong	**ESS** **−23**	MEL −45	COL −4	**CAR** **+22**	**SM** **+48**	**FIT** **+16**	STK +83	ESS +25	**MEL** **+5**	**COL** **+42**	CAR +50	SM +12	FIT +12	**STK** **+78**	1 (11–3–0)	**ESS** **−6**	**MEL** **+9**	**COL** **+4**	2 (2–1–0)
Melbourne	SM +17	**GEE** **+45**	FIT +11	**STK** **+30**	**CAR** **+81**	**COL** **+7**	ESS −36	**SM** **−53**	GEE −5	**FIT** **+27**	STK +58	CAR +28	COL −15	**ESS** **+17**	3 (10–4–0)	**COL** **−4**	GEE −9	ESS −6	4 (0–3–0)
South Melbourne	**MEL** **−17**	**CAR** **+4**	**STK** **+57**	**COL** **+8**	GEE −48	**ESS** **−3**	FIT; 0	MEL +53	CAR +46	STK +61	COL +19	**GEE** **−12**	ESS −4	**FIT** **+1**	5 (8–5–1)				
St Kilda	COL −25	**FIT** **−40**	SM −57	MEL −30	**ESS** **−37**	**CAR** **−11**	**GEE** **−83**	**COL** **−24**	FIT −57	**SM** **−61**	**MEL** **−58**	ESS −91	CAR −34	GEE −78	8 (0–14–0)				

Source: AFL Tables

== Season notes ==
- The game between Essendon and Melbourne in the third round of the finals holds the record for the lowest combined score in a match in VFL/AFL history: 1.16 (22).
- George Stuckey, the captain of the Essendon Football Club team that won the VFL's inaugural premiership, also won the 130-yard Stawell Gift in 1897 in 12.2 seconds off a handicap of 12 yards.
- In the first round of 1897, the VFL revoked the VFA's (then prevailing) push-in-the-back rule. The rule was reinstated before the second round's matches on the following Saturday due to complaints from fans, players and officials.
- On 12 June, a League representative team played against a Ballarat Football League representative team at the Brunswick Street Oval. Ballarat 13.11 (89) defeated the League 8.6 (54).
- On 3 July 1897, Fitzroy rover Bill McSpeerin weaved his way and bounced the ball the length of the Brunswick Street Oval to score a goal against St Kilda.
- Fred Waugh was unable to play in South Melbourne's team for the Round 11 game with St Kilda after attempting suicide. He had been spurned by his lover, and had become disconsolate. His mother found him in his room covered in blood, having cut his throat with a blunt knife. Luckily, he missed severing his windpipe and blood vessels, and a doctor was able to repair the wounds.
- Carlton's first six matches were all away games due to renovations at Princes Park, with the first game at Princes Park being a 5.6 (36) loss to Collingwood 6.4 (40) on 22 June, the Diamond Jubilee Holiday.
- The first-round finals match between Geelong and Essendon at the Corio Oval was the only finals match to be played in Geelong until 2013.

== Leading goalkickers ==
1	Led the goalkicking at the end of the round
1	Led the goalkicking at the end of the home-and-away season
1_{1}	Subscript indicates the player's goal tally to that point of the season
–	Did not play during that round

#	Player	Club	Home-and-away season (leading goalkicker medal)														Finals series			Total	Games	Average
#	Player	Club	1	2	3	4	5	6	7	8	9	10	11	12	13	14	F1	F2	F3	Total	Games	Average
1	Eddy James	Geelong	2_{2}	1_{3}	0_{3}	3_{6}	3_{9}	1_{10}	3_{13}	0_{13}	1_{14}	–_{14}	–_{14}	1_{15}	4_{19}	3_{22}	1_{23}	2_{25}	2_{27}	27	15	1.80
2	Jack Leith	Melbourne	2_{2}	4_{6}	1_{7}	0_{7}	4_{11}	3_{14}	2_{16}	0_{16}	0_{16}	1_{17}	2_{19}	2_{21}	1_{22}	0_{22}	4_{26}	0_{26}	0_{26}	26	17	1.53
3	Norman Waugh	Essendon	2_{2}	0_{2}	1_{3}	2_{5}	–_{5}	–_{5}	1_{6}	2_{8}	1_{9}	1_{10}	2_{12}	2_{14}	4_{18}	1_{19}	0_{19}	4_{23}	0_{23}	23	15	1.53
4	Charlie Coles	Geelong	–_{0}	–_{0}	1_{1}	1_{2}	3_{5}	1_{6}	2_{8}	3_{11}	0_{11}	2_{13}	1_{14}	1_{15}	1_{16}	1_{17}	0_{17}	–_{17}	–_{17}	17	13	1.31
5	Wally O'Cock	Carlton	1_{1}	1_{2}	1_{3}	1_{4}	2_{6}	0_{6}	3_{9}	–_{9}	–_{9}	–_{9}	–_{9}	2_{11}	2_{13}	2_{15}				15	10	1.50
5	Archie Smith	Collingwood	0_{0}	2_{2}	2_{4}	1_{5}	2_{7}	1_{8}	0_{8}	2_{10}	1_{11}	1_{12}	0_{12}	0_{12}	2_{14}	0_{14}	0_{14}	0_{14}	1_{15}	15	17	0.88
7	Hugh Gavin	Essendon	–_{0}	0_{0}	0_{0}	1_{1}	2_{3}	0_{3}	2_{5}	0_{5}	2_{7}	0_{7}	3_{10}	–_{10}	0_{10}	2_{12}	0_{12}	2_{14}	0_{14}	14	15	0.93
7	Dinny McKay	South Melbourne	1_{1}	3_{4}	2_{6}	0_{6}	0_{6}	0_{6}	2_{8}	1_{9}	3_{12}	0_{12}	0_{12}	1_{13}	1_{14}	0_{14}				14	14	1.00
7	Jack Quinn	Geelong	0_{0}	0_{0}	1_{1}	0_{1}	1_{2}	1_{3}	3_{6}	–_{6}	0_{6}	2_{8}	1_{9}	1_{10}	0_{10}	1_{11}	1_{12}	0_{12}	2_{14}	14	16	0.88
7	Fred White	Geelong	–_{0}	–_{0}	–_{0}	–_{0}	–_{0}	0_{0}	0_{0}	2_{2}	–_{2}	0_{2}	3_{5}	2_{7}	0_{7}	3_{10}	1_{11}	1_{12}	2_{14}	14	11	1.27
7	Charlie Young	Melbourne	2_{2}	0_{2}	3_{5}	1_{6}	–_{6}	1_{7}	0_{7}	0_{7}	0_{7}	2_{9}	2_{11}	0_{11}	0_{11}	1_{12}	1_{13}	1_{14}	0_{14}	14	16	0.88

Source: AFL Tables

== Sources ==
- 1897 VFL season at AFL Tables
- 1897 VFL season at Australian Football
