= List of VFL debuts in 1898 =

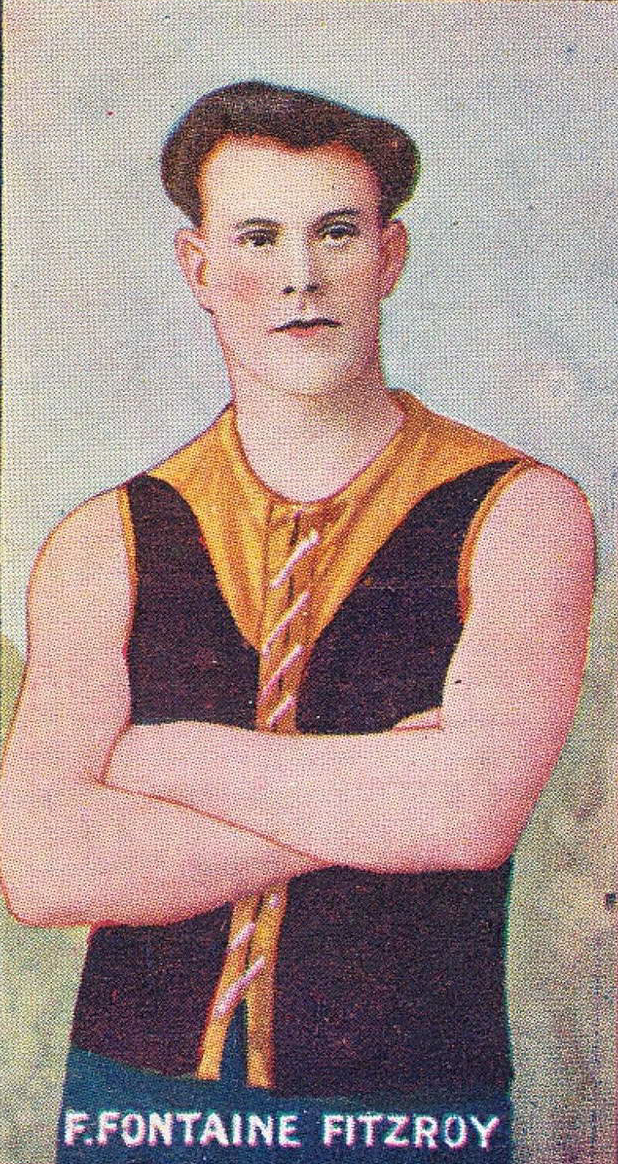
Fitzroy's Fred Fontaine made his debut in the 1898 VFL season

The 1898 Victorian Football League (VFL) season was the second season of the VFL. The season saw 138 Australian rules footballers make their senior VFL debut and six players transferring to new clubs having previously played in the 1897 VFL season.

== Summary ==
Summary of debuts in 1898
Club	VFL debuts	Change of club
Carlton	22	0
Collingwood	6	1
Essendon	10	0
Fitzroy	12	0
Geelong	12	0
Melbourne	20	2
St Kilda	33	3
South Melbourne	23	0
Total	138	6

== Debuts ==
Name	Club	Age at debut	Round debuted	Games	Goals	Notes
Len Morrison	Carlton	25 years, 142 days	1	56	7	
Pat Considine	Carlton	22 years, 345 days	17	48	12	
Bill Sharkey	Carlton	24 years, 236 days	1	47	0	
Charlie Curtis	Carlton	19 years, 155 days	2	21	2	
Jim Pender	Carlton	20 years, 315 days	1	15	4	Brother of Dan, Mick and Laurie Pender.
George Young	Carlton	19 years, 270 days	10	15	1	
Tommy O'Day	Carlton	24 years, 218 days	1	13	8	
Charlie Brown	Carlton	24 years, 259 days	1	12	1	
Herman Dohrmann	Carlton	24 years, 277 days	6	12	2	
Mick Donaghy	Carlton	20 years, 223 days	8	10	0	
Bill Churchyard	Carlton	20 years, 157 days	9	10	4	
Dick Stewart	Carlton	25 years, 155 days	14	6	0	
Jim Coucher	Carlton	23 years, 164 days	5	5	0	
Dan Pender	Carlton	25 years, 68 days	3	4	0	Brother of Jim, Mick and Laurie Pender.
Les Vernon	Carlton	18 years, 90 days	15	3	1	
Des Meadowcroft	Carlton	18 years, 54 days	3	2	0	
Alf Moore	Carlton	25 years, 305 days	3	2	0	
Fred Barlow	Carlton	24 years, 250 days	1	1	0	
Mick Pender	Carlton	29 years, 185 days	2	1	0	Brother of Dan, Jim and Laurie Pender.
Tommy Kinman	Carlton	22 years, 319 days	4	1	1	
Jim Balharry	Carlton	30 years, 119 days	16	1	0	
Jack Douglas	Carlton	25 years, 308 days	17	1	0	
Arthur Leach	Collingwood	22 years, 94 days	5	173	92	Brother of Fred and Ted Leach. Previously played for Essendon.
Matthew Fell	Collingwood	22 years, 264 days	1	116	21	
Bill Kennedy	Collingwood	22 years, 284 days	1	19	1	
Mick Lynch	Collingwood	20 years, 2 days	1	14	15	
George Cowell	Collingwood	27 years, 194 days	1	7	4	
Bobby McCubbin	Collingwood	29 years, 332 days	1	6	0	
Bob Bird	Collingwood	23 years, 71 days	15	1	0	
Jimmy Larkin	Essendon	23 years, 199 days	1	73	61	
Bill Jackson	Essendon	24 years, 73 days	1	27	22	
Alec Hall	Essendon	29 years, 130 days	1	19	18	
Corrie Gardner	Essendon	19 years, 63 days	1	12	0	Brother of Eric Gardner. Represented Australia at the 1904 Summer Olympics.
Conrad ten Brink	Essendon	23 years, 103 days	1	12	10	
Alf Gray	Essendon	23 years, 280 days	15	5	0	
Pat Barr	Essendon	20 years, 291 days	1	3	1	
Pos Watson	Essendon	29 years, 272 days	3	2	0	
Dave Currie	Essendon	22 years, 9 days	4	1	1	
Horrie Stewart	Essendon	26 years, 364 days	4	1	0	
Fred Fontaine	Fitzroy	23 years, 359 days	9	110	33	
Harry Clarke	Fitzroy	21 years, 231 days	10	91	3	
Eddie Drohan	Fitzroy	21 years, 301 days	1	75	5	
Bill Potter	Fitzroy	26 years, 95 days	1	60	8	
Alf McDougall	Fitzroy	21 years, 193 days	6	59	28	Father of Roy McDougall.
Bill Dalton	Fitzroy	26 years, 154 days	1	57	9	Brother of John G. Dalton.
Johnny Power	Fitzroy	24 years, 41 days	2	10	2	
Charlie Jenkins	Fitzroy	19 years, 331 days	1	8	0	
George Shaw	Fitzroy	21 years, 132 days	10	5	1	
Charlie Doherty	Fitzroy	22 years, 121 days	1	2	0	
Arthur Davidson	Fitzroy	22 years, 294 days	7	2	0	
Jim Tulloch	Fitzroy	19 years, 321 days	1	1	0	
Les Bailiff	Geelong	20 years, 327 days	9	63	0	
Ernie Leighton	Geelong	26 years, 72 days	5	29	18	
Jack O'Loughlin	Geelong	24 years, 277 days	1	22	1	
Alf Dear	Geelong	19 years, 233 days	2	22	3	
Dick Walker	Geelong	25 years, 284 days	2	14	10	
Walter Cooke	Geelong	21 years, 184 days	2	9	1	
Alec King	Geelong	24 years, 52 days	11	6	3	
Jack Dore	Geelong	23 years, 1 days	3	5	0	
Arthur McKenzie	Geelong	18 years, 238 days	14	4	0	
Ossie Calvert	Geelong	18 years, 9 days	13	2	0	
Bill Robertson	Geelong	19 years, 51 days	2	1	0	
Ernest Anderson	Geelong	20 years, 340 days	11	1	0	
Bill McClelland	Melbourne	23 years, 164 days	11	75	3	
Les Rippon	Melbourne	22 years, 212 days	12	55	6	
Vic Cumberland	Melbourne	21 years, 54 days	15	50	15	At 43, the oldest player to have played in the VFL. Brother of Cec Cumberland.
Richard Pirrie	Melbourne	19 years, 29 days	1	24	11	
Eddie Byers	Melbourne	23 years, 93 days	1	20	1	
Denis Lanigan	Melbourne	23 years, 361 days	1	16	1	Previously played for Collingwood.
Jack Davidson	Melbourne	23 years, 95 days	13	68	3	
Tom Davey	Melbourne	22 years, 45 days	1	8	0	
Pat Scanlan	Melbourne	19 years, 353 days	8	6	2	
Les MacPherson	Melbourne	17 years, 362 days	1	5	1	
Percy Howard	Melbourne	27 years, 97 days	2	5	4	
Frank Staines	Melbourne	21 years, 195 days	2	5	0	
Johnny Coghlan	Melbourne	22 years, 76 days	9	5	0	
Dick Robertson	Melbourne	21 years, 81 days	13	5	0	
Harold Rippon	Melbourne	24 years, 178 days	14	5	0	Brother of Les and Norm Rippon.
Jimmy Aitken	Melbourne	26 years, 34 days	7	4	0	Previously played for Carlton. First player in the VFL to play senior premiership matches for two clubs in the same season.
Art Atkinson	Melbourne	20 years, 140 days	14	4	1	
Bobby Royle	Melbourne	19 years, 263 days	1	3	1	
Bill Atkinson	Melbourne	21 years, 319 days	15	3	0	
Bob Moore	Melbourne	26 years, 103 days	1	2	0	
Norm Rippon	Melbourne	20 years, 236 days	1	1	0	Brother of Les and Harold Rippon.
Henry Hagenauer	Melbourne	19 years, 279 days	13	1	0	
Howard Smith	St Kilda	20 years, 68 days	1	95	6	
Andy Stewart	St Kilda	21 years, 243 days	3	49	47	Brother of George and Walter Stewart.
George Stewart	St Kilda	24 years, 184 days	3	29	3	
Tom Blake	St Kilda	24 years, 297 days	1	24	4	Previously played for Carlton.
Johnny Dando	St Kilda	20 years, 177 days	3	23	3	
George Morgan	St Kilda	23 years, 122 days	11	16	1	
Jim Morehouse	St Kilda	34 years, 48 days	1	10	0	
Walter Stewart	St Kilda	23 years, 36 days	2	10	0	
Dave Gibson	St Kilda	19 years, 96 days	3	10	0	
Tom Fogarty	St Kilda	20 years, 89 days	7	10	0	
Jim Warne	St Kilda	19 years, 96 days	10	10	1	
George May	St Kilda	23 years, 236 days	15	10	1	
Peter Brady	St Kilda	22 years, 359 days	1	8	3	
Percy Damman	St Kilda	22 years, 42 days	7	7	0	
Bill Woodhouse	St Kilda	24 years, 284 days	8	7	2	Previously played for Carlton.
Artie Archer	St Kilda	26 years, 201 days	1	5	0	
Horrie Lyons	St Kilda	22 years, 130 days	1	5	1	Previously played for South Melbourne.
Mark Cumming	St Kilda	25 years, 291 days	1	4	0	
Richardson	St Kilda	24 years, 245 days	1	3	0	
Billy Porter	St Kilda	23 years, 33 days	15	3	0	
Harold Brookes	St Kilda	22 years, 73 days	7	2	2	Brother of Herbert and Norman Brookes.
Alf Clauscen	St Kilda	23 years, 78 days	13	2	0	
David Gaunson	St Kilda	18 years, 253 days	13	1	0	
Edmund Kirwin	St Kilda	22 years, 044 days	1	1	0	
Harry Barr	St Kilda	18 years, 133 days	3	1	0	
Bert Kay	St Kilda	21 years, 14 days	4	1	0	
Edgar Maddox	St Kilda	20 years, 41 days	6	1	0	
Don Walker	St Kilda	24 years, 335 days	6	1	0	
Harry Thompson	St Kilda	26 years, 241 days	12	1	0	
Ralph Hatch	St Kilda	22 years, 104 days	13	1	0	
George Hunter	St Kilda	24 years, 193 days	13	1	0	
Alf Smith	St Kilda	31 years, 122 days	14	1	0	
Alf Parker	St Kilda	22 years, 125 days	16	1	0	
Herb Louch	St Kilda	23 years, 249 days	17	1	0	
Jack Purse	St Kilda	19 years, 74 days	17	1	0	Brother of Hugh Purse.
Jack Todd	St Kilda	19 years, 134 days	17	1	0	
Henri Jeanneret	South Melbourne	20 years, 133 days	1	79	12	Born in Switzerland.
Albert Trim	South Melbourne	22 years, 220 days	1	65	0	
Charlie Colgan	South Melbourne	19 years, 314 days	1	37	43	
George Cornelius	South Melbourne	23 years, 275 days	1	16	2	
Warwick Armstrong	South Melbourne	19 years, 111 days	17	16	18	Captained the Australian cricket team.
George Sparrow	South Melbourne	28 years, 175 days	7	14	2	
Arch McNair	South Melbourne	17 years, 298 days	11	13	0	
Johnny Davis	South Melbourne	21 years, 208 days	1	10	6	
Jim Jolly	South Melbourne	25 years, 342 days	3	7	0	
Val Robertson	South Melbourne	19 years, 110 days	12	7	0	
Eddie Brown	South Melbourne	20 years, 216 days	1	5	1	
Jason Ralph	South Melbourne	25 years, 348 days	6	5	0	
John McDermott	South Melbourne	26 years, 39 days	8	5	3	
Harry Gardner	South Melbourne	20 years, 163 days	13	5	0	
Artie Machin	South Melbourne	23 years, 265 days	3	3	0	
Bob O'Donnell	South Melbourne	28 years, 63 days	8	3	2	
Joe Chandler	South Melbourne	20 years, 336 days	14	3	2	
Billy Kenny	South Melbourne	26 years, 239 days	1	2	0	Father of Bill Kenny.
Joe Strong	South Melbourne	22 years, 36 days	10	2	0	
Tom Smith	South Melbourne	25 years, 260 days	11	2	0	
Jack O'Hara	South Melbourne	31 years, 337 days	15	2	1	
George Taylor	South Melbourne	21 years, 331 days	13	1	0	
Jim McArthur	South Melbourne	28 years, 38 days	14	1	0	
