= George Hunter =

George Hunter may refer to:

== Politicians ==
- George Hunter (mayor) (1788–1843), first mayor of Wellington, New Zealand
- George Hunter (politician, born 1821) (1821–1880), his son, New Zealand politician
- George Hunter (politician, born 1859) (1859–1930), his son, New Zealand politician
- George Robert Hunter (1884–1949), member of the New Zealand Legislative Council

== Sportspeople ==
- George Hunter (baseball) (1887–1968), baseball player for the 1909 Brooklyn Superbas
- George Hunter (boxer) (1927–2004), South African boxer
- George Hunter (footballer, born 1885) (1885–1934), English footballer, played for Manchester United
- George Hunter (footballer, born 1902) (1902–?), English footballer for Sunderland
- George Hunter (footballer, born 1930) (1930–1990), Scottish footballer, played for Celtic and Derby County
- George Hunter (rugby league) (1928–2009), Australian rugby league player and coach
- George Hunter (rugby union) (born 1991), Scottish rugby union player, plays for Glasgow Warriors
- George Hunter (speedway rider) (1939–1999), Scottish motorcycle speedway rider
- George Hunter (Australian footballer) (1874–1944), Australian rules footballer

== Others ==
- George Hunter (author) (1867–1927), American authority on decorative art
- George Hunter (Coca-Cola bottler) (1886–1950), businessman and philanthropist who made his fortune bottling Coca-Cola
- George Hunter (photographer) (1921–2013), Canadian journalistic photographer
- George Burton Hunter (1845–1937), British shipping magnate
- George W. Hunter (missionary) (1861–1946), Scottish missionary with the China Inland Mission to Xinjiang
- George W. Hunter III, parasitologist and educator with the US Army Sanitary Corps and Army Medical School
- George William Hunter (1863-1948), wrote Civic Biology, the text at the center of the Scopes "monkey" trial
- George King Hunter (1855–1940), U.S. Army general
- Leslie Hunter (George Leslie Hunter, 1879–1931), Scottish painter and colourist
