= Robert O'Donnell =

Robert O'Donnell may refer to:

- Robert R. O'Donnell (1924–2003). American businessman and philanthropist
- Robert O'Donnell (cricketer) (born 1994), New Zealand cricketer
- R.J. O'Donnell (1891–1959). American businessman and philanthropist
- Bob O'Donnell (born 1943), American politician
- Robert O'Donnell (1957–1995), paramedic involved in the rescue of Jessica McClure
- Bob O'Donnell (footballer) (1870–1940), Australian rules footballer
- Rob O'Donnell (born 1985), English rugby union player
