= Clauscen =

Clauscen is a surname. Notable people with the surname include:

- Alf Clauscen (1874–1948), Australian rules footballer
- Ted Clauscen (1906–1983), Australian rules footballer
