= Len Morrison =

Australian rules footballer

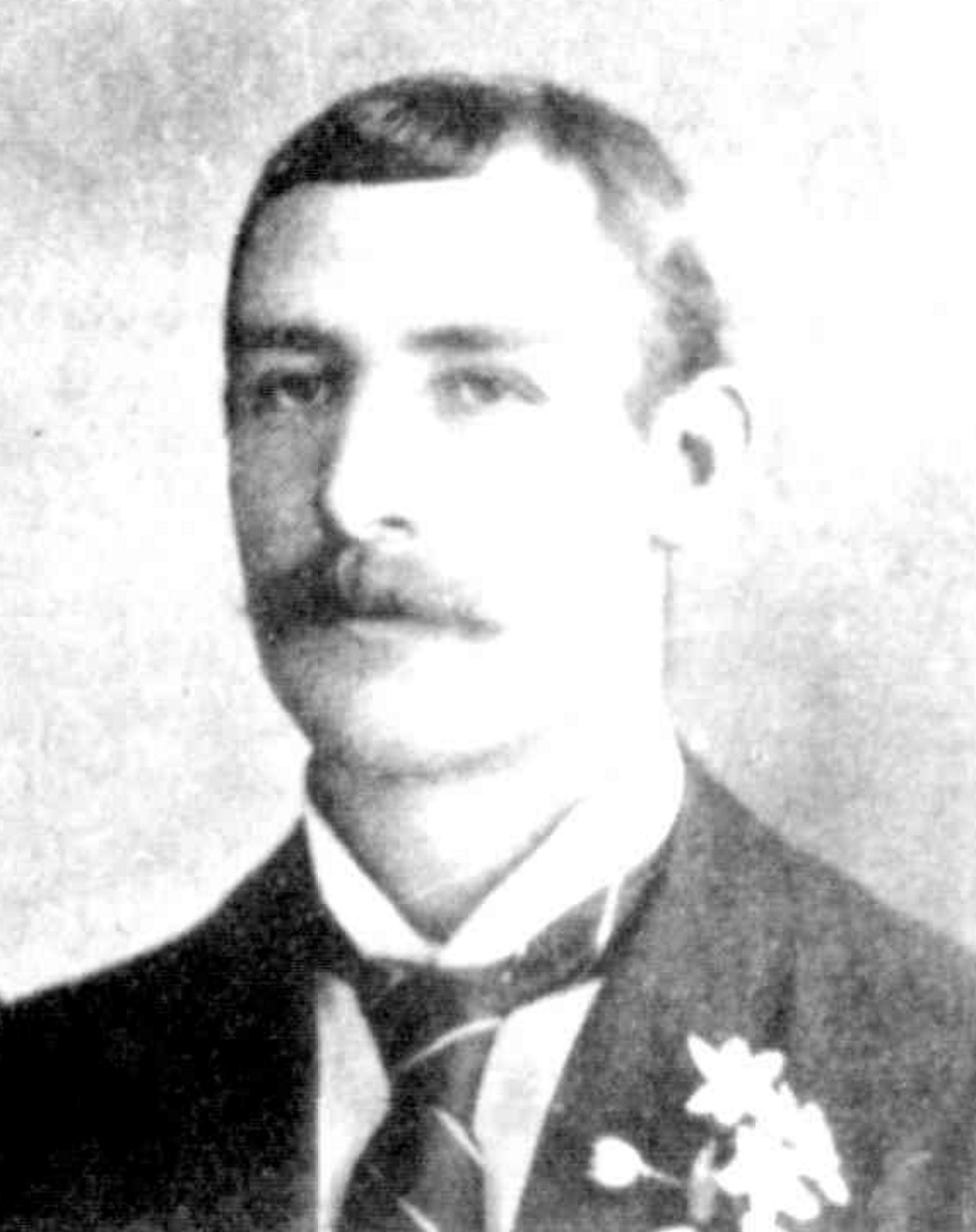
- Morrison in 1899

Personal information
- Full name: Leonard Graham Morrison
- Born: 23 December 1872; Amphitheatre, Victoria
- Died: 16 November 1922 (aged 49); West Melbourne, Victoria
- Original team: Albion United

Playing career^{1}
Years	Club	Games (Goals)
1898–1902	Carlton (VFL)	56 (7)
1902–1905	North Melbourne (VFA)	61 (20)
- ^{1} Playing statistics correct to the end of 1902.

Leonard Graham Morrison (23 December 1872 – 16 November 1922) was an Australian rules footballer who played with Carlton in the Victorian Football League (VFL), and with North Melbourne in the Victorian Football Association (VFA).

== Family ==
The son of Martin Nevis Morrison, and Isabella Morrison, née Graham, Leonard Graham Morrison was born at Amphitheatre, Victoria on 23 December 1872.

He married Martha Baker in 1907.

== North Melbourne (VFA) ==
Recruited from Victorian Junior Football Association team Albion United in 1893, he first played for North Melbourne in the VFA competition from 1893 to 1895.

== Imperials (WAFA) ==
Morrison was recruited from North Melbourne by the Imperials Football Club in 1896, and played for the club in 1896 and 1897.

The Imperials disbanded at the end of the 1897 season. While many of its players transferred to the East Fremantle Football Club (which entered the WAFA competition in 1898), Morrison and his team-mate Tommy O'Dea went to Carlton in 1898.

== Carlton (VFL) ==
On 13 May 1898, Morrison and Tommy O'Dea were cleared to play for the VFL team, Carlton; that is, rather than their former VFA team, North Melbourne.

He made his debut for Carlton in the 14 May 1898 match against South Melbourne.

Neither Morrison nor his team-mate Pat Considine were able to take the field for Carlton's match against Geelong, at the Corio Oval, on Saturday, 8 July 1899. They were both waiting on the platform at the North Melbourne Railway Station, and the train they were scheduled to catch sped through the station without stopping.

== North Melbourne (VFA) ==
Granted a clearance from Carlton on 4 June 1902, Morrison played 61 games in his second stint with the VFA team, North Melbourne, over four seasons — including the team's 1903 Grand Final victory over Richmond, and its 1905 Grand Final loss to Richmond — and kicked a total of 20 goals.

== Death ==
He died at his North Melbourne residence on 16 November 1922.
