= Jim Pender =

Jim Pender may refer to:

- Jim Pender (footballer, born 1877) (1877–1915), Australian rules footballer for Carlton
- Jim Pender (footballer, born 1911) (1911–1985), Australian rules footballer for Geelong

== See also ==
- Sir James Pender, 1st Baronet, British businessman, yachtsman and politician
- Jim Penders, baseball coach
