= Andy Stewart (Australian footballer) =

Australian rules footballer

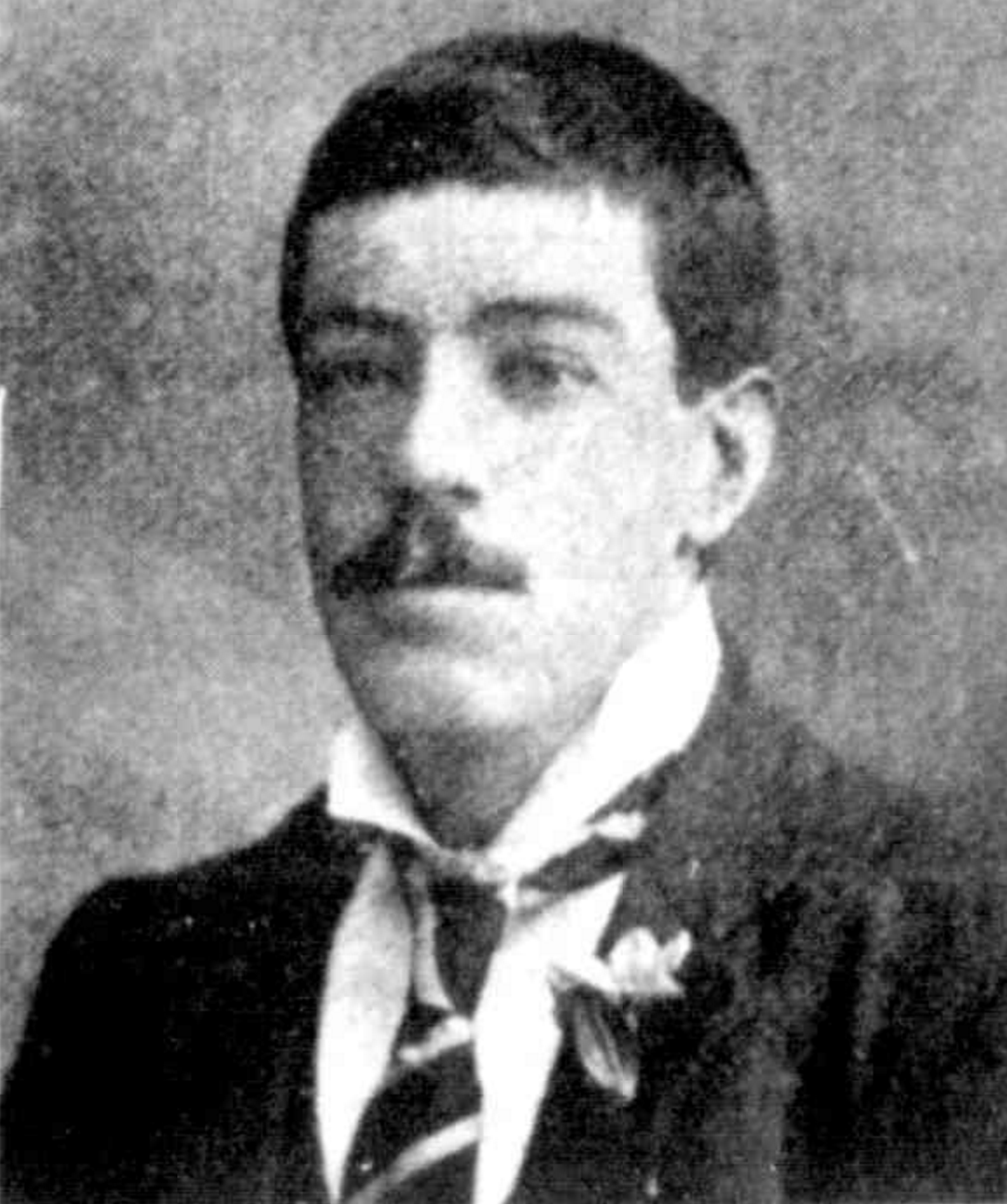
- Stewart in 1899

Personal information
- Full name: Andrew Tasman Harold Stewart
- Born: 23 September 1876; Prahran, Victoria
- Died: 12 August 1919 (aged 42); Richmond, Victoria
- Original team: South Yarra

Playing career^{1}
Years	Club	Games (Goals)
1898–1901	St Kilda	49 (47)
- ^{1} Playing statistics correct to the end of 1901.

Andrew Tasman Harold "Nixey" Stewart (23 September 1876 – 12 August 1919) was an Australian rules footballer who played with St Kilda in the Victorian Football League (VFL).

From South Yarra, Stewart also had two brothers, George and Walter, who played for St Kilda.

Stewart was St Kilda's leading goal-kicker in 1898 and 1899, with 23 and 16 goals respectively. His tally in the 1898 season was bettered only by Collingwood's Archie Smith and Geelong's Eddy James.
