= Churchyard (surname) =

Churchyard is a surname. Notable people with the surname include:

- Bill Churchyard (1878–1957), Australian rules footballer
- Steve Churchyard, English record producer
- Thomas Churchyard (c. 1520–1604), English author
- Thomas Churchyard (painter) (1798–1865), English painter
