= Balharry =

Balharry is a surname. Notable people with the surname include:

- Dick Balharry (1937–2015), Scottish conservationist, writer, and wildlife photographer
- Jim Balharry (1868–1958), Australian rules footballer
