= Dick Stewart =

Dick Stewart may refer to:

- Dick Stewart (Australian footballer) (1873–1933), Australian rules footballer
- Dick Stewart (rugby union) (1871–1931), New Zealand rugby union player
- Dick Stewart (TV host) (1928–2019), American singer, bandleader, actor and television host
