= Jim Pender (footballer, born 1877) =

Australian rules footballer

Personal information
- Full name: James Robert Pender
- Born: 3 July 1877; North Melbourne, Victoria
- Died: 2 July 1916 (aged 38); Bois-Grenier, France
- Original team: Wellington

Playing career^{1}
Years	Club	Games (Goals)
1898	Carlton	15 (4)
- ^{1} Playing statistics correct to the end of 1898.

James Robert Pender (3 July 1877 – 2 July 1916) was an Australian rules footballer who played with Carlton Football Club in the Victorian Football League (VFL).

== Family ==
The son of Michael Pender, and Mary Anne Pender, née O'Dowd, James Robert Pender was born in North Melbourne, Victoria (then known as "Hotham") on 3 July 1877.

His three brothers – Michael "Mick" Pender (1868–1924) (Carlton), Daniel Emmett "Dan" Pender (1873–1968) (Carlton), and Peter Lawrence John Aloysius "Laurie" Pender (1887–1966) (Geelong) – all played VFL football.

He married Minne Ethel Harvey (1882–1959) in 1900. Their son, James Michael "Jim" Pender (1911–1985), played one First XVIII match for Geelong in 1936.

== Football ==
Pender played for the Wellington Football Club in the Geelong Junior football Association, and briefly played for Geelong during the latter part of the 1896 VFA season.

In 1898 he received a permit to play with Carlton and he played 15 games with the Carlton First XVIII that year.

== Military service ==
He enlisted in the First AIF on 9 July 1915.

== Death ==
He was killed in action, in France, on 2 July 1916.

On 2 July 1916, while serving as the batman of Second Lieutenant Robert David Julian, and having been told that his officer (and good friend) Julian had been shot while in charge of a party raiding the German trenches, impaled upon barbed wire in "no man's Land", and very possibly dead, and that the others (also wounded) fighting with him had been able to bring him back to the Australian lines, Pender went out to find him and bring him back.

Pender did not return to the Australian lines, and was never seen again (and neither was Julian).

Pender was declared "missing in action" in July 1916; and was officially declared "killed in action on 2 July 1916" in 1917.

== Memorial ==
He has no grave. His death is commemorated at the Villers–Bretonneux Australian National Memorial.

== See also ==
- List of Victorian Football League players who died on active service
