= Thomas Davey =

Thomas Davey may refer to:

- Thomas Davey (governor) (1758–1823), second lieutenant governor of Van Diemens Land
- Thomas Davey (New Zealand politician) (1856–1934), MP for Christchurch and Christchurch East
- Thomas Davey (mayor) (1844–1928), lord mayor of Melbourne
- Thomas Davey (florist), British florist and nurseryman
- Tom Davey (baseball) (born 1973), American baseball player
- Tom Davey (footballer, born 1876) (1876–1907), Australian rules footballer with Melbourne
- Tom Davey (footballer, born 1916) (1916–1978), Australian rules footballer with Hawthorn

== See also ==
- Thomas Davy (disambiguation)
