= James MacArthur (disambiguation) =

James MacArthur (1937–2010) was an American actor.

James MacArthur may also refer to:

- James Macarthur (bishop) (1848–1922), British Anglican bishop
- James Macarthur (politician) (1798–1867), Australian pastoralist and politician

== See also ==
- James McArthur (born 1987), Scottish football player
- James J. McArthur, (1856–1925), Canadian surveyor and mountaineer
- James McArthur (baseball) (born 1996)
- Jim McArthur (born 1952), Scottish goalkeeper
- Jim McArthur (Australian footballer) (1870–1937), Australian rules footballer
