= Thomas Davy =

Thomas Davy or Davie may refer to:

- Thomas Davy (politician) (1890–1933), Minister for Education (Western Australia)
- Thomas Davy (cyclist) (born 1968), former French cyclist
- Thomas Benjamin Davie, academic and vice-chancellor of the University of Cape Town

== See also ==
- Thomas Davey (disambiguation)
