= Tommy Kinman =

Australian rules footballer

Personal information
- Full name: Thomas Samuel Kinman
- Born: 13 July 1875; Melbourne, Victoria
- Died: 22 November 1941 (aged 66); East Brunswick, Victoria
- Original team: Cumberland

Playing career^{1}
Years	Club	Games (Goals)
1898	Carlton (VFL)	1 (1)
1899, 1901-2	North Melbourne (VFA)	22 (24)
1903	Preston (VFA)	
- ^{1} Playing statistics correct to the end of 1903.

Tommy Kinman (13 July 1875 – 22 November 1941) was an Australian rules footballer who played with Carlton in the Victorian Football League (VFL).

== Family ==
The son of Richard Kinman (1844-1921), and Sophia Kinman (1849-1909), née Haselam, Thomas Samuel Kinman was born in Melbourne, Victoria on 13 July 1875.

He married Catherine McIlwaine (1878–1948), at St Peter's Church, Eastern Hill, on 12 July 1905. They had three children; one of whom died as an infant.

== Football ==
=== Carlton (VFL) ===
He played in two matches for the Carlton First XVII, at full-forward: against Geelong, at Princes Park, on 28 May 1898 (he kicked one goal), and against Collingwood, at Victoria Park, on 4 June 1898, in which Carlton's 6 behinds to Collingwood's 6 goals 12 behinds, represents Carlton's lowest-ever score on record.

On 21 June 1898, he was cleared from Carlton to the West Melbourne Football Club.

=== North Melbourne (VFA) ===
He played in 22 games, scoring 24 goals, for the North Melbourne Football Club in the VFA over three seasons: 1899, 1901, and 1902.

=== Preston (VFA) ===
On 1 July 1903 he was cleared from North Melbourne to the Preston Football Club.

== Boxing ==
On 15 October 1895 he fought the (undefeated) bantamweight champion, Michael "Micko" Walsh, and lost, in the fifth round, by a knockout.

== Death ==
He died at his residence in East Brunswick, Victoria on 22 November 1941.
