= Harold Rippon =

Australian rules footballer

Personal information
- Full name: Harold Holt Rippon
- Born: 23 February 1874; Abbotsford, Victoria
- Died: 16 January 1917 (aged 42); Albert, Somme, France
- Original team: Caulfield

Playing career^{1}
Years	Club	Games (Goals)
1898–1900	Melbourne	5 (0)
1903	South Melbourne	5 (0)
Total		10 (0)
- ^{1} Playing statistics correct to the end of 1903.

Harold Holt Rippon (23 February 1874 – 16 January 1917) was an Australian rules footballer who played with Melbourne and South Melbourne in the Victorian Football League (VFL).

== Family ==
The son of Samuel Rippon (1845-1897), and Lucretia Eliza Rippon (1848-1899), née Butterworth, Harold Holt Rippon was born at Abbotsford, Victoria on 23 February 1874.

His brothers, Les and Norm, also played for Melbourne in the VFL.

== Football ==
=== Melbourne (VFL) ===
Rippon played in four senior games for Melbourne in 1898—including the match against St Kilda, at the Junction Oval, on 3 September 1898, where he appeared with both his brothers, Les and Norm—and in one game, the match against St Kilda, at the Junction Oval on 5 May 1900, where he played as a replacement for his brother, Les.

=== South Melbourne (VFL) ===
In 1903 he was cleared from Melbourne to South Melbourne. He played in 5 senior games in 1903—in four of which his brother, Norm, also played.

== Cricket ==
He played Sub-District Cricket for the Caulfield Cricket Club.

== Military service ==
He was a private in the 2nd Pioneer Battalion during World War I.

== Death ==
He died on 16 January 1917 from the wounds he sustained on 14 January 1917, while fighting in the Western Front.

=== Burial ===
He is buried at Heilly Station Cemetery, Mericourt-L'Abbe.

== See also ==
- List of Victorian Football League players who died on active service
