= William Sharkey =

Bill, Billy, Will or William Sharkey may refer to:

- William L. Sharkey (1798–1873), American judge and politician
- William J. Sharkey (US Navy officer) (1885–1918), officer in the United States Navy during World War I
- William J. Sharkey (murderer) (1847–?), convicted murderer and minor New York City politician
- Bill Sharkey (footballer) (1873–1946), Australian footballer
- Bill Sharkey (boxer) (1949–1998), American boxer
- Bill Sharkey, a member of The Barron Knights
