= USS Sharkey =

Clemson-class destroyer

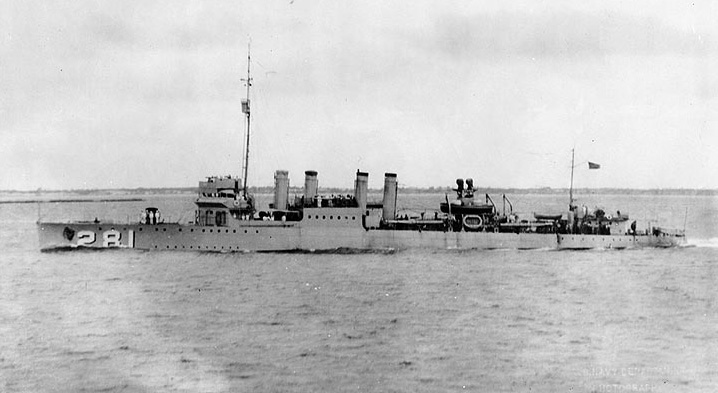
- USS Sharkey (DD-281) underway in 1924.

History

United States
- Namesake: William J. Sharkey
- Builder: Bethlehem Shipbuilding Corporation, Squantum Victory Yard
- Laid down: 14 April 1919
- Launched: 12 August 1919
- Commissioned: 28 November 1919
- Decommissioned: 1 May 1930
- Stricken: 22 October 1930
- Fate: Sold for scrapping, on 17 January 1931

General characteristics
- Class & type: Clemson-class destroyer
- Displacement: 1,215 tons
- Length: 314 feet 4 1/2 inches (95.822 m)
- Beam: 30 feet 11 1/2 inches (9.436 m)
- Draft: 9 feet 4 inches (2.84 m)
- Propulsion: 26,500 shp (20 MW); geared turbines, 2 screws
- Speed: 35 knots (65 km/h)
- Range: 4,900 nmi (9,100 km); @ 15 kt
- Complement: 122 officers and enlisted
- Armament: 4 × 4 in (102 mm)/50 guns, 1 × 3 in (76 mm)/25 gun, 12 × 21 inch (533 mm) torpedo tubes

USS Sharkey (DD-281) was a Clemson-class destroyer in the United States Navy following World War I. She was named for William J. Sharkey.

== History ==
Sharkey was laid down on 14 April 1919 by the Bethlehem Shipbuilding Corporation, Squantum, Massachusetts; launched on 12 August 1919; sponsored by Mrs. Mary E. Sharkey; and commissioned on 28 November 1919.

Immediately after commissioning, Sharkey was sent to the rescue of SS Powhatan and was one of four ships standing by as the stricken vessel was taken under tow. She then completed shakedown out of Newport, Rhode Island, and departed that port on 28 January 1920 for Guantanamo Bay. Late in April, she steamed to Boston for repairs. When the work was completed, she joined the Reserve Destroyers, Atlantic Fleet, at Charleston, South Carolina, on 5 October.

Sharkey got underway on 10 May 1921 for summer operations out of Newport and returned to Charleston on 24 October. She departed again on 29 May 1922 for exercises off Norfolk, Virginia, which lasted until she entered the Boston Navy Yard for repairs on 2 December.

Sharkey sailed on 11 January 1923 for the Caribbean, and participated in Fleet Problem I off Panama and in combined fleet exercises until sailing from the Caribbean on 2 April for the Philadelphia Navy Yard. Departing the yard on 11 August, she participated in maneuvers off Newport and, between 31 August and 4 September, the Fisherman's Races at Gloucester, Massachusetts, before departing Newport on 1 October 1923 for exercise areas off Norfolk. She spent the period from 18 November 1923 to 3 January 1924 in the Philadelphia Navy Yard.

On 4 January 1924, Sharkey sailed from Lynnhaven Roads, Virginia, with the Scouting Fleet for the annual fleet concentration in the Caribbean. The exercises lasted from 11 January to 28 February, after which Sharkey underwent overhaul at Boston from 3 March to 14 June. Between 10 July and 28 July, she operated with Colorado off Bermuda testing a range finder for destroyers and, after repairs to a bent propeller, completed the trials between 5 September and 24 September with West Virginia. Following more exercises, she arrived at Philadelphia on 1 November 1924.

On 10 January 1925, Sharkey departed Philadelphia for the Caribbean. On 26 January, she embarked the President and Cabinet of Haiti for a short cruise, and then trained with the fleet in the Caribbean until 28 March. She made reserve training cruises from Philadelphia between 14 April and 6 May; but, on the latter date, damaged a turbine and entered the Norfolk Navy Yard for repairs. She resumed reserve training cruises between 23 July and 5 September 1925 and cruised to Guantanamo and back between 19 September and 20 November.

Sharkey returned to Guantanamo on 13 January 1926, and transited the Panama Canal on 4 February to participate in Fleet Problem VI off the west coast of Central America. She returned to Norfolk on 21 February and remained there undergoing overhaul until 23 April. On 17 June, she departed Newport with her division for Europe. She visited northern European ports between 29 June and 20 November 1926; then spent three months in the western Mediterranean and visited the eastern Mediterranean from 20 February to 7 May 1927. She next made a one-week cruise in the Black Sea, visiting Romania and Bulgaria before returning to Newport on 11 July 1927. She spent the remainder of the year in making naval reserve cruises and twice undergoing repairs at Norfolk.

Sharkey arrived at Guantanamo on 11 January 1928 and operated with the fleet in the Caribbean until 31 March. After training reserves off Norfolk and Newport, she underwent overhaul at Norfolk from 29 July to 2 October. She exercised off Charleston for two months and returned to Norfolk for the Christmas holidays. Underway on 4 January 1929, Sharkey transited the Panama Canal on the 20th and participated in Fleet Problem IX and combined fleet exercises off Panama. Again transiting the canal on 7 March, she continued exercises with the fleet in the Caribbean until 27 April. After exercises and reserve training cruises on the east coast, she entered the Norfolk Navy Yard on 22 July for overhaul.

== Fate ==
She was ordered decommissioned instead, and was towed to the Philadelphia Navy Yard by Kalmia on 2 October 1929 and decommissioned there on 1 May 1930. Sharkey was struck from the Navy list on 22 October 1930 and sold for scrapping on 17 January 1931 to Boston Iron and Metal Company, Baltimore, Maryland.

As of 2005, no other ship has been named Sharkey.
