= Robert R. O'Donnell =

American businessman

Robert R. O'Donnell (1924–2003) was an American businessman and philanthropist who, with partners Robert Hartgrove and Alvin Guggenheim, co-owned the Majestic chain of theaters during the classical Hollywood narrative. O'Donnell is best known for his work in motion picture exhibition and distribution and oversaw the world premieres of over 50 films starring actors John Wayne, Clint Eastwood, George Peppard, Jack Nicholson, James “Jimmy” Stewart, and Charlton Heston, among many others. O’Donnell also served as Chief Barker (President) of the Variety Club Children's Charity Tent 17.

Robert O’Donnell's uncle and mentor was vice president of Interstate Theaters and “the # 1 motion picture exhibitor in the United States” R.J. O’Donnell.

== Early life ==
Robert R. O'Donnell was born in Chicago, Cook County, Illinois on May 23, 1924, to Gerald Meglar O'Donnell and Ethel Huntzinger and was the second born of two children. As a child, O'Donnell attended St. Ambrose Elementary School in Chicago, however, at age fifteen he began his career in show business delivering handbills for the Shakespeare Theater in Chicago.

After moving to San Antonio, Texas in 1939, O’Donnell worked as an usher, chief usher and assistant manager for Interstate Theaters. He enlisted in the United States Army as a military policeman in December 1942.

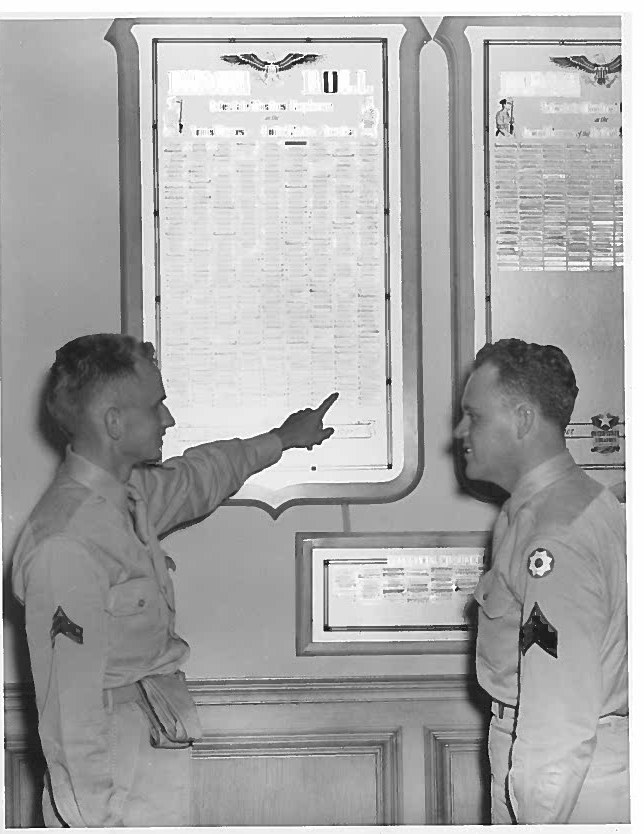
1943 U.S. Army photo of Corporal Robert R. O'Donnell and Sergeant Fox at the Aztec Theater in San Antonio

== World War II service ==
O’Donnell volunteered for service in the U.S. Army in December 1942. Because he had lost his left eye in a bow and arrow accident as a child, the government would not let him deploy overseas and made him a military police officer stationed stateside. His duties included the supervision of German prisoners of war confined in Texas. His grade upon separation was E-4.

== Awards and decorations ==
Military Awards
American Theater Campaign Medal
Army Good Conduct Medal
World War II Victory Medal
Expert Marksman - Carbine

== Career ==
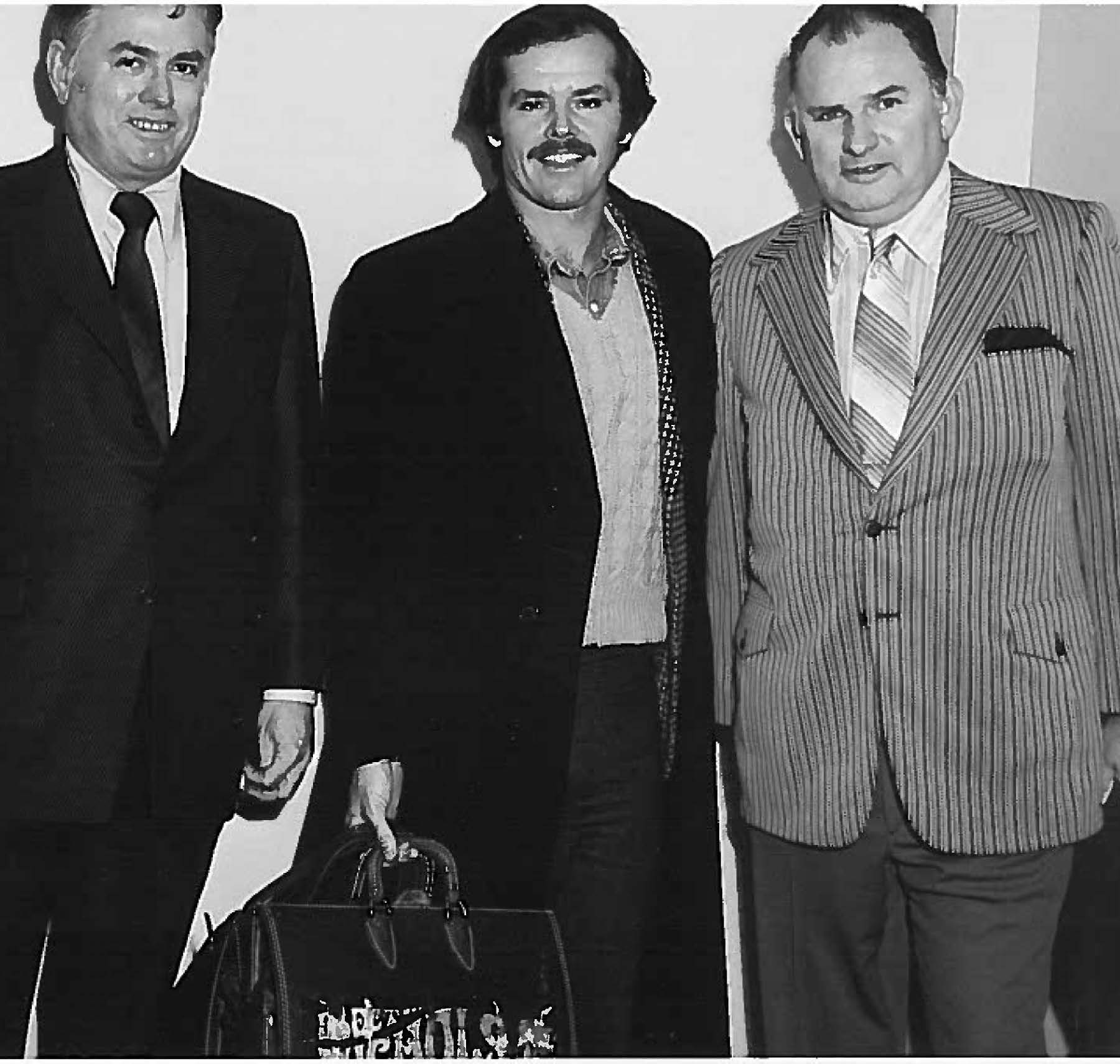
From left to right: Bob Hartgrove, Jack Nicholson and Robert R. O'Donnell at the 1978 Dallas premiere of "Goin' South"

San Antonio, Texas

After the war, O’Donnell held numerous management positions at venues wholly owned by Interstate Theaters including the Aztec, the Sunset and the Laurel theaters. In 1948, O’Donnell married Eula Jean Baird who would serve as his secretary until the end of his life.

In 1958, O’Donnell became a franchise holder of American International Pictures (AIP), an American motion picture production label of Metro-Goldwyn-Mayer, which released 30 films that year, including several by pop cinema trailblazer Roger Corman. During O’Donnell's tenure, AIP pioneered the 2-to-1 ratio anamorphic Superama widescreen process.

The industry networking achieved at Interstate Theaters and AIP would set the stage for O’Donnell's success in motion picture exhibition with McLendon Theaters in Dallas in 1968.

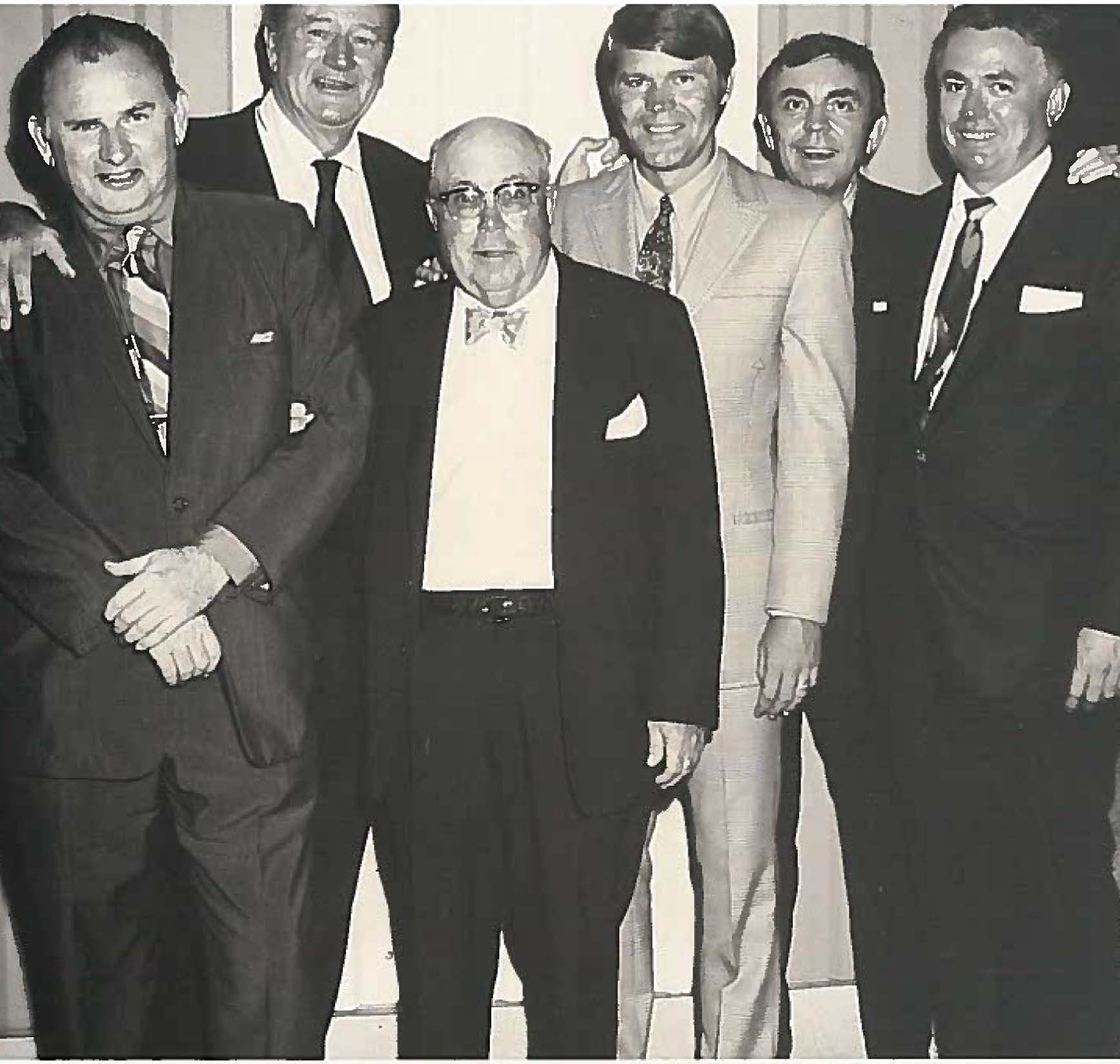
From left to right: Robert R. O'Donnell, John Wayne, B.R. McLendon, Glen Campbell, Gordon McLendon and Bob Hartgrove at the 1969 Dallas premiere of "True Grit"

Dallas, Texas

In December 1968, O’Donnell joined McLendon Theaters as general manager and assistant to the president. O’Donnell was responsible for the operation of over sixty movie theaters across the Midwest and Deep South. During his time with McLendon Theaters, O’Donnell orchestrated the world premieres of numerous popular films of the late 1960s and early 1970s starring actors John Wayne, Clint Eastwood, George Peppard, Jack Nicholson, James “Jimmy” Stewart and Charlton Heston, among many others. O’Donnell would pick up the star from the airport and drive them to the premiere venue where he would supervise the movie opening.

The McLendon theater empire mushroomed from five screens in 1968 to over 90 screens by 1973. When McLendon decided to sell the theater circuit in 1973, he said “The tremendous expansion which began in 1969 would not have been possible without O’Donnell’s aid.” He went on to praise O’Donnell as “having more knowledge of the motion picture industry than any other theater executive I happen to have come across in these four decades that I have been in business.”

In 1973, O’Donnell left McLendon theaters and became partner and part-owner of the Majestic chain of theaters which, at the time, included thirteen theaters in Texas.

== Later life ==
In 1980, in addition to the Majestic chain of theaters, O’Donnell founded “Texas Movies Inc.” as a distributor for independent films.

By the late 1990s, O’Donnell was showing signs of dementia and was diagnosed with Alzheimer's disease. He died on June 18, 2003.

== Legacy and philanthropy ==
The Variety Club Children's Charity of Dallas

After joining Tent 17 in 1951, O’Donnell served as a Variety Club member for 35 years. In 1979, O’Donnell became Chief Barker (President) of Tent 17.

== See also ==
- R.J. O'Donnell
- Gordon McLendon
