= George Cowell =

Australian rules footballer

Personal information
- Full name: Albert David George Cowell
- Born: 1 November 1870; Ballarat East, Victoria
- Died: 27 April 1937 (aged 66); Ballarat
- Original team: Beaufort

Playing career^{1}
| Years | Club | Games (Goals) |
| 1896 | South Ballarat | |
| 1898 | Collingwood | 11 (2) |
| 1899 | Carlton | 7 (4) |
| 1900 | North Melbourne (VFA) | 1 (0) |
- ^{1} Playing statistics correct to the end of 1900.

Albert David George Cowell (1 November 1870 – 27 April 1937) was an Australian rules footballer who played with Collingwood and Carlton in the Victorian Football League (VFL).

== Family ==
The third of 12 children born to Edmund Cowell (1843–1918), and Caroline Cowell (1841–1910), née Pierpoint, Albert David George Cowell was born at Ballarat East on 1 November 1870.

George Cowell married Emily Maud Nichols (1869–1942) in early 1894 and they had three children: Charles Aubrey Nicholas Cowell (1894–1917), Lydia Amy Isabel Cowell (1896–1971), later Mrs. Hector Godfrey Smith, and George Cowell (1897–1970).

== Football ==
=== South Ballarat ===
Originally from Beaufort, Cowell played with South Ballarat in 1896.

=== Collingwood ===
Cowell played 11 games with Collingwood in the 1898 VFL season.

=== Carlton ===
Cowell transferred to Carlton at the start of the 1899 VFL season and played seven games for the Blues.

=== North Melbourne ===
Cowell then transferred to North Melbourne at the start of the 1900 season but played only a single senior game for them in Round 1.

== Later life ==
Cowell worked as a baker and pastrycook, returning to Ballarat after his football career where he died in April 1937.
