= Jim Jolly =

Australian rules footballer

Personal information
- Full name: James Jolly
- Born: 16 June 1872; Clunes, Victoria
- Died: 24 December 1947 (aged 75); Heidelberg, Victoria

Playing career^{1}
Years	Club	Games (Goals)
1898	South Melbourne	7 (0)
- ^{1} Playing statistics correct to the end of 1898.

James Jolly (16 June 1872 – 24 December 1947) was an Australian rules footballer who played with South Melbourne in the Victorian Football League (VFL).

== Family ==
The son of Zacharias Jolly (1839-1899), and Jane Jolly (1843-1876), née Thomas, James Jolly was born at Clunes, Victoria on 16 June 1872.

He married Ethel Sarah Barrett (1875-1949) on 2 May 1906. They had one child, a daughter Estelle (b.1918).

== Football ==
He played in seven games for South Melbourne in 1898: the first, against Geelong, at the Corio Oval on 24 May 1898, and the last against Essendon, at the East Melbourne Cricket Ground, on 9 July 1898.

In its review of the 1898 VFL season, the Australasian noted that South Melbourne's Jolly, who "was as fast and clever in the centre as any man he met", "had to leave Melbourne about the middle of the season".

== Death ==
He died at Heidelberg, Victoria on 24 December 1947.
