= Jim Warne =

Australian rules footballer

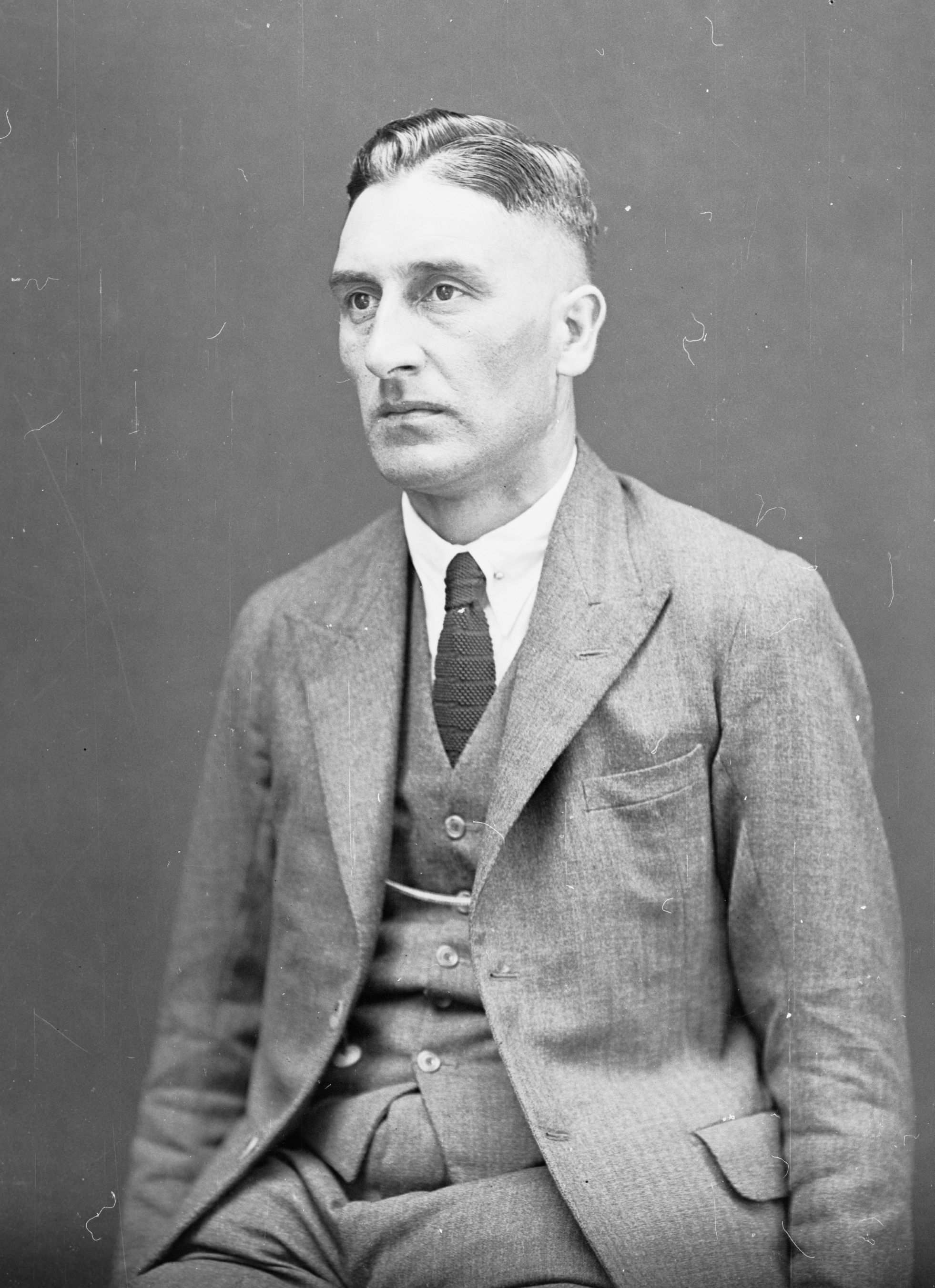

Personal information
- Full name: James Washington Warne
- Born: 11 April 1879; Melbourne, Victoria
- Died: February 1957 (aged 77); Caulfield, Victoria
- Original team: Windsor Juniors

Playing career^{1}
Years	Club	Games (Goals)
1898–99	St Kilda	10 (1)
- ^{1} Playing statistics correct to the end of 1899.

James Washington Warne (11 April 1879 – February 1957) was an Australian rules footballer who played with St Kilda in the Victorian Football League (VFL).

== Family ==
The son of Francis Warne (1849-1899), and Sarah Warne, née Williams, James Washington Warne was born at Melbourne, Victoria on 11 April 1879.

He married Amy Amelia Quirk (1874-1934) in 1907.

== Football ==
=== St Kilda (VFL) ===
Recruited from Windsor Juniors, Warne played his first match for St Kilda against Fitzroy, at the Brunswick Street Oval, on 16 July 1898, and went on to play in the remaining seven games of the 1898 season.

He played twice in 1899, bring his total to ten matches — his last game was against Fitzroy, at the Brunswick Street Oval, on 27 May 1899.

=== Prahran (VFA) ===
Cleared from St Kilda on 1 May 1900, he played for the Prahran Football Club in the Victorian Football Association (VFA) for two seasons: 1900 and 1901.

== Death ==
He died at Caulfield, Victoria, in February 1957 and is interred at Cheltenham Memorial Cemetery.
