= Artie Archer =

Australian rules footballer

Personal information
- Full name: Arthur Edmund Archer
- Born: 25 October 1871; Prahran, Victoria
- Died: 17 November 1938 (aged 67); Caulfield, Victoria
- Original team: Marylebone

Playing career^{1}
Years	Club	Games (Goals)
1898	St Kilda	5 (0)
- ^{1} Playing statistics correct to the end of 1898.

Arthur Edmund Archer (25 October 1871 – 17 November 1938) was an Australian rules footballer who played for the St Kilda Football Club in the Victorian Football League (VFL).

== Family ==
The son of Walter Edmund Archer (1823-1892), and Elizabeth Ann Archer (1832-1903), née Harner, Arthur Edmund Archer was born in Prahran, Victoria on 25 October 1871.

== Football ==
=== St. Kilda (VFA) ===
He played for St. Kilda in the VFA from 1893 to 1896.

=== Fremantle Football Club (WAFA) ===
He played for the Fremantle Football Club in 1897.

=== St. Kilda (VFL) ===
He played for St. Kilda in the VFL in 1898. His knee was so badly injured during the round 7 match against Carlton on 18 June 1898 that he had to leave the field. He never played senior VFL football again.

== Death ==
He died at the Caulfield Repatriation Hospital on 17 November 1938.
