= Les Rippon =

Australian rules footballer

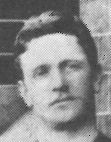

Personal information
- Full name: Leslie Herbert Rippon
- Born: 30 December 1875; St Kilda, Victoria
- Died: 27 September 1949 (aged 73); Ararat, Victoria
- Original team: Caulfield juniors

Playing career^{1}
Years	Club	Games (Goals)
1898–1902	Melbourne	55 (6)
- ^{1} Playing statistics correct to the end of 1902.

Career highlights
- VFL premiership player: 1900

Leslie Herbert 'Les' Rippon (30 December 1875 – 27 September 1949) was an Australian rules footballer who played for the Melbourne Football Club in the Victorian Football League (VFL). He became one of the club's first premiership players, playing in the 1900 VFL Grand Final, under the captaincy of Dick Wardill. Rippon made his debut against Essendon in round 1 of the 1898 VFL season, at the Melbourne Cricket Ground.

== Family ==
The son of Samuel Rippon (1845-1897), and Lucretia Eliza Rippon (1848-1899), née Butterworth, Leslie Herbert Rippon was born at St Kilda, Victoria on 30 December 1875.

His brothers, Norm and Harold, also played for Melbourne in the VFL.
