= Denis Lanigan =

Australian rules footballer

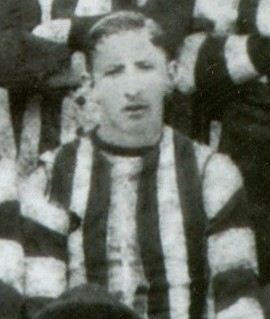
- Lanigan in 1895 during his Collingwood VFA career

Personal information
- Full name: Denis Lanigan
- Born: 18 May 1874; County Tipperary, Ireland
- Died: 1 February 1933 (aged 58); Fitzroy, Victoria
- Original team: Collingwood Juniors

Playing career^{1}
Years	Club	Games (Goals)
1897	Collingwood	11 (3)
1898	Melbourne	16 (1)
1899	Carlton	14 (2)
Total		41 (6)
- ^{1} Playing statistics correct to the end of 1899.

Denis Lanigan (18 May 1874 – 1 February 1933) was an Australian rules footballer who played with Collingwood, Melbourne and Carlton in the Victorian Football League (VFL). His name is also given as Dan Lanigan in some sources.

Lanigan holds a place in VFL/AFL history as the first player to compete for three clubs. His 11 appearances for Collingwood included two semi finals. He then crossed to Melbourne and played in 16 of a possible 17 games for them in the 1898 VFL season. A year later he was at another club, Carlton, with whom he made 14 appearances.
