= Mick Lynch (footballer) =

Australian rules footballer (1878–1944)

Personal information
- Full name: Joseph Michael Lynch
- Born: 12 May 1878; Geelong, Victoria
- Died: 14 June 1944 (aged 66); Kew, Victoria
- Original team: Richmond City
- Height: 173 cm (5 ft 8 in)
- Weight: 68 kg (150 lb)

Playing career^{1}
Years	Club	Games (Goals)
1898	Collingwood	14 (15)
- ^{1} Playing statistics correct to the end of 1898.

Mick Lynch (12 May 1878 – 14 June 1944) was an Australian rules footballer who played with Collingwood in the Victorian Football League (VFL).

In 1899 he was cleared to Richmond but he never played a senior game for them.
