= Bill Atkinson (Australian footballer) =

Australian rules footballer

Personal information
- Full name: William John Atkinson
- Born: 12 October 1876; South Melbourne, Victoria
- Died: 26 September 1966 (aged 89); South Yarra, Victoria
- Original team: Collegians

Playing career^{1}
Years	Club	Games (Goals)
1898	Melbourne	3 (0)
- ^{1} Playing statistics correct to the end of 1898.

William John Atkinson (12 October 1876 – 26 September 1966) was an Australian rules footballer who played with Melbourne in the Victorian Football League (VFL).
