= Norm Rippon =

Australian rules footballer

Personal information
- Full name: Norman Butterworth Rippon
- Born: 10 January 1878; St Kilda, Victoria
- Died: 7 November 1977 (aged 99); Wonthaggi, Victoria
- Original team: Caulfield Juniors
- Height: 175 cm (5 ft 9 in)
- Position: Centre

Playing career^{1}
Years	Club	Games (Goals)
1898	Melbourne	1 (0)
1901–04	South Melbourne	36 (2)
Total		37 (2)
- ^{1} Playing statistics correct to the end of 1904.

Norman Butterworth Rippon (10 January 1878 – 7 November 1977) was an Australian rules footballer who played with Melbourne and South Melbourne in the Victorian Football League (VFL).

== Family ==
The son of Samuel Rippon (1845-1897), and Lucretia Eliza Rippon (1848-1899), née Butterworth, Norman Butterworth Rippon was born at St Kilda, Victoria on 10 January 1878.

His brothers, Les and Harold, also played for Melbourne in the VFL.

Rippon married Margaret Wilhelmina Paul (1884-1926), at Myrtleford, Victoria, on 1 July 1916. He married Alice Victoria Hansen (1892-1965), at Bayswater, Victoria, on 20 November 1926. His son, Norman, a promising cricketer, who worked on his father's farm at Kongwak, in Gippsland, Victoria was killed in a motor accident in 1939.
