= Bobby McCubbin =

Australian rules footballer

Personal information
- Full name: Robert Lorimer McCubbin
- Born: 16 June 1868; Woodend, Victoria
- Died: 10 March 1950 (aged 81); Kyneton, Victoria
- Original team: Williamstown
- Height: 182 cm (6 ft 0 in)
- Weight: 84 kg (185 lb)

Playing career^{1}
Years	Club	Games (Goals)
1898	Collingwood	6 (0)
- ^{1} Playing statistics correct to the end of 1898.

Robert Lorimer McCubbin (16 June 1868 – 10 March 1950) was a former Australian rules footballer who played with Collingwood in the Victorian Football League (VFL).
