= Cec Cumberland =

Australian rules footballer

Personal information
- Full name: Cecil George Cumberland
- Born: 22 February 1875; Toorak, Victoria
- Died: 14 July 1951 (aged 76); Brisbane, Queensland
- Original team: Kingston

Playing career^{1}
Years	Club	Games (Goals)
1899	Melbourne	5 (3)
- ^{1} Playing statistics correct to the end of 1899.

Cecil George Cumberland (22 February 1875 – 14 July 1951), the brother of Vic Cumberland, was an Australian rules footballer who played five senior games with Melbourne in the Victorian Football League (VFL) in 1899.
