= Frank Staines =

Australian rules footballer (1876–1937)

Personal information
- Full name: Francis Christopher Staines
- Born: 7 November 1876; Collingwood, Victoria
- Died: 12 August 1937 (aged 60); Westminster, London, England
- Original team: Richmond City

Playing career^{1}
Years	Club	Games (Goals)
1898	Melbourne	5 (0)
- ^{1} Playing statistics correct to the end of 1898.

Francis Christopher Staines (7 November 1876 – 12 August 1937) was an Australian rules footballer who played with Melbourne in the Victorian Football League (VFL).
