= Ralph Hatch =

Australian rules footballer

Personal information
- Full name: Ralph Oscar Hatch
- Born: 1 May 1876; Melbourne, Victoria
- Died: 13 July 1944 (aged 68); Auchenflower, Queensland

Playing career^{1}
| Years | Club | Games (Goals) |
| 1898 | St Kilda | 1 (0) |
- ^{1} Playing statistics correct to the end of 1898.

Ralph Oscar Hatch (1 May 1876 – 13 July 1944) was an Australian rules footballer who played with St Kilda in the Victorian Football League (VFL).
