= Edgar Maddox =

Australian rules footballer

Personal information
- Full name: Edgar Huckvale Maddox
- Born: 1 May 1878; Melbourne, Victoria
- Died: 1 September 1923 (aged 45); Waterfall, New South Wales
- Original team: Port Melbourne
- Height: 174 cm (5 ft 9 in)
- Weight: 75 kg (165 lb)

Playing career^{1}
| Years | Club | Games (Goals) |
| 1898 | St Kilda | 1 (0) |
- ^{1} Playing statistics correct to the end of 1898.

Edgar Huckvale Maddox (1 May 1878 – 1 September 1923) was an Australian rules footballer who played with St Kilda in the Victorian Football League (VFL).

== Family ==
The son of William Fowler Maddox (1848–1912), and Elizabeth Annie Maddox (1849–1927), née Barnett, Edgar Huckvale Maddox was born in Melbourne on 1 May 1878.

== Death ==
He died at Waterfall, New South Wales on 1 September 1923.
