= William J. Sharkey (US Navy officer) =

William J. Sharkey (20 March 1885 – 5 October 1918) was an officer in the United States Navy during World War I.

== Biography ==
Born in Auburn, New York, Sharkey attained the enlisted rate of Chief Gunners Mate. He was appointed Ensign on 15 March 1918 and assigned to the submarine USS O-5.

On 5 October 1918, fumes were reported in the after battery room, and Lieutenant (junior grade) Sharkey was killed as he tried to prevent the explosion that followed.

== Namesake ==
- USS Sharkey (DD-281) was named for him.
- Sharkey Theatre, Joint Base Pearl Harbor–Hickam
