= Tom Smith (Australian footballer) =

Australian rules footballer

Personal information
- Full name: Thomas Johnston Smith
- Born: 24 May 1873; South Melbourne, Victoria
- Died: 25 October 1928 (aged 55); Port Melbourne, Victoria
- Original team: Montague / Albert Park

Playing career^{1}
Years	Club	Games (Goals)
1898	South Melbourne	2 (0)
- ^{1} Playing statistics correct to the end of 1898.

Tom Smith (24 May 1873 – 25 October 1928) was an Australian rules footballer who played with South Melbourne in the Victorian Football League (VFL).
