= George Robert Hunter =

New Zealand trade unionist, civil servant and politician

The Honourable George Robert Hunter MLC
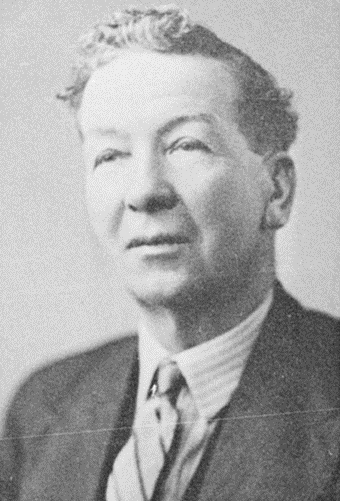

Member of the Legislative Council
- In office 9 March 1936 – 23 October 1949
- Appointed by: Michael Joseph Savage

Personal details
- Born: 1884 Victoria, Australia
- Died: 23 October 1949 (aged 64–65) Christchurch, New Zealand
- Party: Labour Party

George Robert Hunter (1884 – 23 October 1949) was a New Zealand trade unionist, civil servant and politician.

== Biography ==
Hunter was born in Victoria, Australia in 1884. He spent some years at Rutherglen in the mining industry. While there he became a friend of Paddy Webb before moving to New Zealand in 1908. In 1910 he became secretary of the State Coal Miners' Union before later becoming the first town clerk of the Runanga Borough Council. He was a racing enthusiast and was the owner of several racehorses.

He moved from Runanga to Christchurch and was elected a member of the Christchurch City Council from 1927 to 1929. He was also a member of the Drainage Board. He was appointed a member of the New Zealand Legislative Council from 9 March 1936 to 8 March 1943, and then from 9 March 1943 to 23 October 1949, when he died, he was appointed by the First Labour Government.

Hunter died on 23 October 1949 in Christchurch.
