= Arch McNair =

Australian rules footballer

Personal information
- Full name: Archibald MacIndoe McNair
- Born: 28 September 1880; Richmond, Victoria
- Died: 18 February 1960 (aged 79); Kew, Victoria

Playing career^{1}
Years	Club	Games (Goals)
1898–1899	South Melbourne	13 (0)
- ^{1} Playing statistics correct to the end of 1899.

Archibald MacIndoe McNair (28 September 1880 – 18 February 1960) was an Australian rules footballer who played for the South Melbourne Football Club in the Victorian Football League (VFL).

He subsequently played for Richmond in the VFA and later served as a committeeman and treasurer of the club.
