= Jim Morehouse =

Australian rules footballer

Personal information
- Full name: James Irving Morehouse
- Nickname: Jigger
- Born: 6 April 1864; Melbourne, Victoria
- Died: 2 November 1914 (aged 50); Wagga Wagga, New South Wales
- Position: Ruck

Playing career^{1}
Years	Club	Games (Goals)
1886–1887	Prahran	
1888–1889	St Kilda	
1890–1893	Carlton	
1894–1897	Fremantle	
1898	St Kilda	10 (0)
- ^{1} Playing statistics correct to the end of 1898.

James Irving "Jigger" Morehouse (6 April 1864 – 2 November 1914) was an Australian rules footballer who played with VFA clubs Prahran, St Kilda, Richmond and Carlton. He then moved to Western Australia and played with the Fremantle club from 1894-97. Upon his return to Victoria he joined St Kilda in the newly established Victorian Football League (VFL). Morehouse was commonly known by the nickname 'Jigger'.

== Family ==
The son of William Morehouse (1829–1904), and Harriet Morehouse (1830–1897), née Merrick, James Irving Morehouse was born in Melbourne on 6 April 1864.

James Irvine "Jigger" Morehouse along with his brother Arthur William "Artie" Morehouse lived in Moss Street, Prahran. In 1885 the pair played football with Hawksburn; James was elected to the club committee.

== Football ==
Morehouse played for Hawksburn in 1885 and at the club's 6th Annual Meeting was elected to the committee. On 20 March 1886, members of Hawksburn, South Yarra and Southern Cross Football Clubs held a meeting at Prahran Court House and formed the Prahran Football Club with the view to apply for membership of the senior footballing body, the Victorian Football Association. James and his brother Arthur joined the new club and played the 1886 and 1887 seasons. When Prahran was absorbed by St Kilda after the 1887 season, the brothers became St Kilda players. In 1890 the brothers played with Richmond and then the following year they joined Carlton.

Before moving to Carlton in the VFA, Morehouse played for several years with Prahran—as did his brother, Arthur William Morehouse (1866–1931), who, in addition to playing with Prahran in 1886 and 1887, also played with St Kilda (1888-1889), Richmond (1890), and Carlton (1891) in the VFA.

== Death ==
He died of pleurisy at the Wagga Wagga Hospital on 2 November 1914.
