= Percy Howard (Australian footballer) =

Australian rules footballer (1871–1955)

Personal information
- Full name: Percy Howard
- Born: 13 February 1871; Kew, Victoria
- Died: 21 August 1955 (aged 84); St Kilda, Victoria
- Original team: West Melbourne

Playing career^{1}
| Years | Club | Games (Goals) |
| 1898 | Melbourne | 5 (4) |
- ^{1} Playing statistics correct to the end of 1898.

Percy Howard (13 February 1871 – 21 August 1955) was an Australian rules footballer who played with Melbourne in the Victorian Football League (VFL).
