= Harry Barr (footballer) =

Australian rules footballer

Personal information
- Full name: Henry John Barr
- Born: 11 January 1880; Footscray, Victoria
- Died: c. 28 July 1909 (aged 29) en route from Durban to Cape Town
- Original team: Footscray Juniors

Playing career^{1}
Years	Club	Games (Goals)
1898	St Kilda	1 (0)
- ^{1} Playing statistics correct to the end of 1898.

Henry John Barr (11 January 1880 – c. 28 July 1909) was an Australian rules footballer who played with St Kilda in the Victorian Football League (VFL).

He died in July 1909 when the SS Waratah sank off the South African coast.
