= Edmund Kirwin =

Australian rules footballer

Personal information
- Full name: Edmund Kirwin
- Born: 31 March 1876; Richmond, Victoria
- Original team: Albert Park

Playing career^{1}
Years	Club	Games (Goals)
1898	St Kilda	1 (0)
- ^{1} Playing statistics correct to the end of 1898.

Edmund Kirwin (31 March 1876, date of death unknown) was an Australian rules footballer who played with St Kilda in the Victorian Football League (VFL).

== Family ==
The son of Michael Kirwin (1861–1884), and Kate Kirwin, née Dunn, Edmund Kirwin was born at Richmond, Victoria on 31 March 1876.

== Cricket ==
He was a well-established batsman, playing for the St Kilda Cricket Club for more than a decade.

== Football ==
=== St Kilda (VFL) ===
In June 1898 he was granted a clearance from St Kilda to Albert Park.
