= Eddie Byers =

Australian rules footballer

Personal information
- Full name: Edwin Arthur Byers
- Born: 10 February 1875; Melbourne, Victoria
- Died: 23 February 1949 (aged 74); Chatswood, New South Wales
- Original team: Hawthorn (VJFA)

Playing career^{1}
| Years | Club | Games (Goals) |
| 1898, 1900 | Melbourne | 20 (0) |
- ^{1} Playing statistics correct to the end of 1800.

Edwin Arthur Byers (10 February 1875 – 23 February 1949) was an Australian rules footballer who played with Melbourne in the Victorian Football League (VFL).
