= George Hunter (author) =

George Leland Hunter, A.B. (1867–1927) was an American authority on decorative art. He was born at Bellingham, Massachusetts, and educated at Phillips Exeter Academy and at Harvard University (A.B., 1889).

He taught in Chicago for a decade, then moved to New York City. His writings appeared in many magazine articles and in several books. He wrote Tapestries, their Origin, History, and Renaissance (1912), which was regarded as the finest book in English on the subject.

== Selected works ==
- Tapestries — Their Origin, History, and Renaissance. With four illustrations in color and 147 half-tone engravings. Publisher: John Lane Company; New York 1912
- Home Furnishing (1913)
- The House that Jack Built (1914)
- Italian Furniture and Interiors (1917)
- Decorative Textiles (1918)
