= Val Robertson =

Australian rules footballer

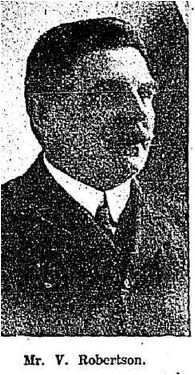
- Robertson in 1908

Personal information
- Full name: Valentine George Robertson
- Born: 11 April 1879; South Yarra, Victoria
- Died: 11 March 1940 (aged 60); Malvern, Victoria
- Original team: South Yarra
- Position: Wing

Playing career^{1}
Years	Club	Games (Goals)
1898–99	South Melbourne	7 (0)
1900–04	St Kilda	59 (0)
Total		66 (0)
- ^{1} Playing statistics correct to the end of 1904.

Valentine George Robertson (11 April 1879 – 11 March 1940) was an Australian rules footballer who played with South Melbourne and St Kilda in the Victorian Football League (VFL).
