= Jim Pender (footballer, born 1911) =

Australian rules footballer

Personal information
- Full name: James Michael Pender
- Born: 15 October 1911; Geelong, Victoria
- Died: 12 August 1985 (aged 73); Borroloola, Northern Territory
- Height: 185 cm (6 ft 1 in)
- Weight: 73 kg (161 lb)

Playing career^{1}
Years	Club	Games (Goals)
1936	Geelong	1 (0)
- ^{1} Playing statistics correct to the end of 1936.

James Michael Pender (15 October 1911 – 12 August 1985), the son of James Robert Pender was an Australian rules footballer who played with Geelong in the Victorian Football League (VFL).
