= Ted Clauscen =

Australian rules footballer (1906–1983)

Personal information
- Full name: Edmund Clauscen
- Born: 17 June 1906
- Died: 19 February 1983 (aged 76)
- Original team: Williamstown

Playing career^{1}
Years	Club	Games (Goals)
1929–30	North Melbourne	25 (0)
- ^{1} Playing statistics correct to the end of 1930.

Edmund Clauscen (17 June 1906 – 19 February 1983) was an Australian rules footballer who played with North Melbourne in the Victorian Football League (VFL).

Originally from St Kilda Seconds, Clauscen came to Williamstown in 1926 and played a total of 41 games and kicked 8 goals for 'Town up until the end of the 1928 season. He then crossed to North Melbourne in 1929.
