= George Hunter (footballer, born 1902) =

English association football player

Personal information
- Date of birth: 1902
- Place of birth: Hylton Colliery, England
- Height: 6 ft 0 in (1.83 m)
- Position: Wing half

Youth career
- Walker Parish Church

Senior career*
Years	Team	Apps	(Gls)
1920–1921	Hylton Colliery		
1921–1923	Sunderland	10	(0)
1923–1924	Exeter City	18	(0)
1924–1925	Workington		
1925–1926	Southend United	0	(0)
1926	Doncaster Rovers	0	(0)
1926–19??	Scunthorpe & Lindsey United		
- * Club domestic league appearances and goals

George Hunter (1902 – after 1926) was an English professional footballer who played as a wing half for Sunderland.
