= Peter Brady (footballer) =

Australian rules footballer

Personal information
- Full name: Peter John Brady
- Born: 20 May 1875; Caulfield, Victoria
- Died: 9 July 1949 (aged 74); Glen Huntly, Victoria
- Original team: Brighton

Playing career^{1}
Years	Club	Games (Goals)
1898–99	St Kilda	8 (3)
- ^{1} Playing statistics correct to the end of 1899.

Peter John Brady (20 May 1875 – 9 July 1949) was an Australian rules footballer who played with St Kilda in the Victorian Football League (VFL).
