= Thomas Churchyard (painter) =

English painter

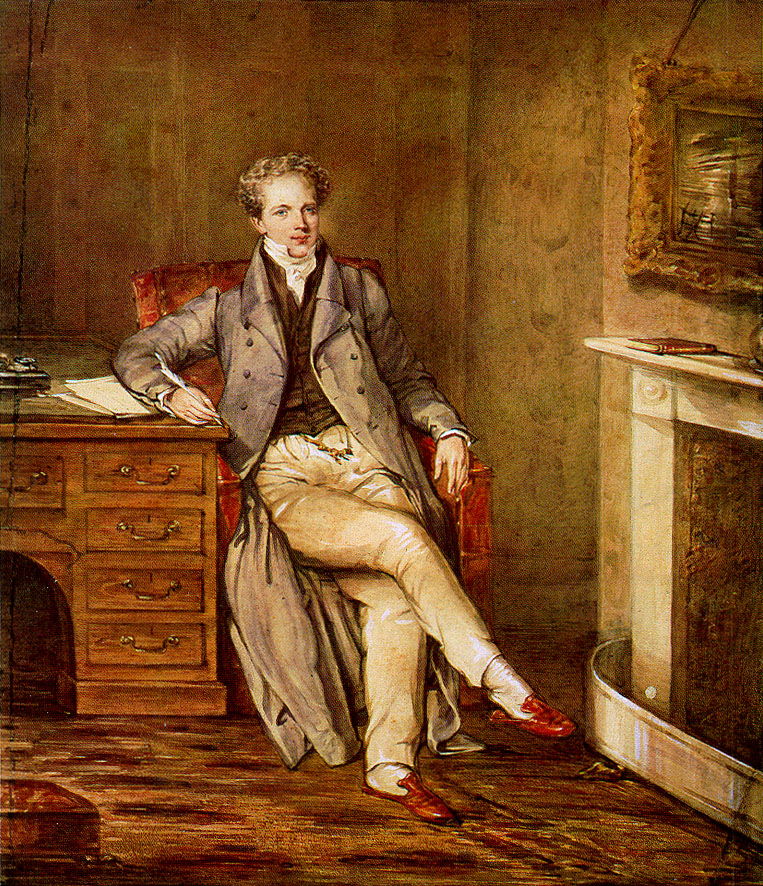
Portrait of Thomas Churchyard (by unknown artist) around the time of his wedding in 1825

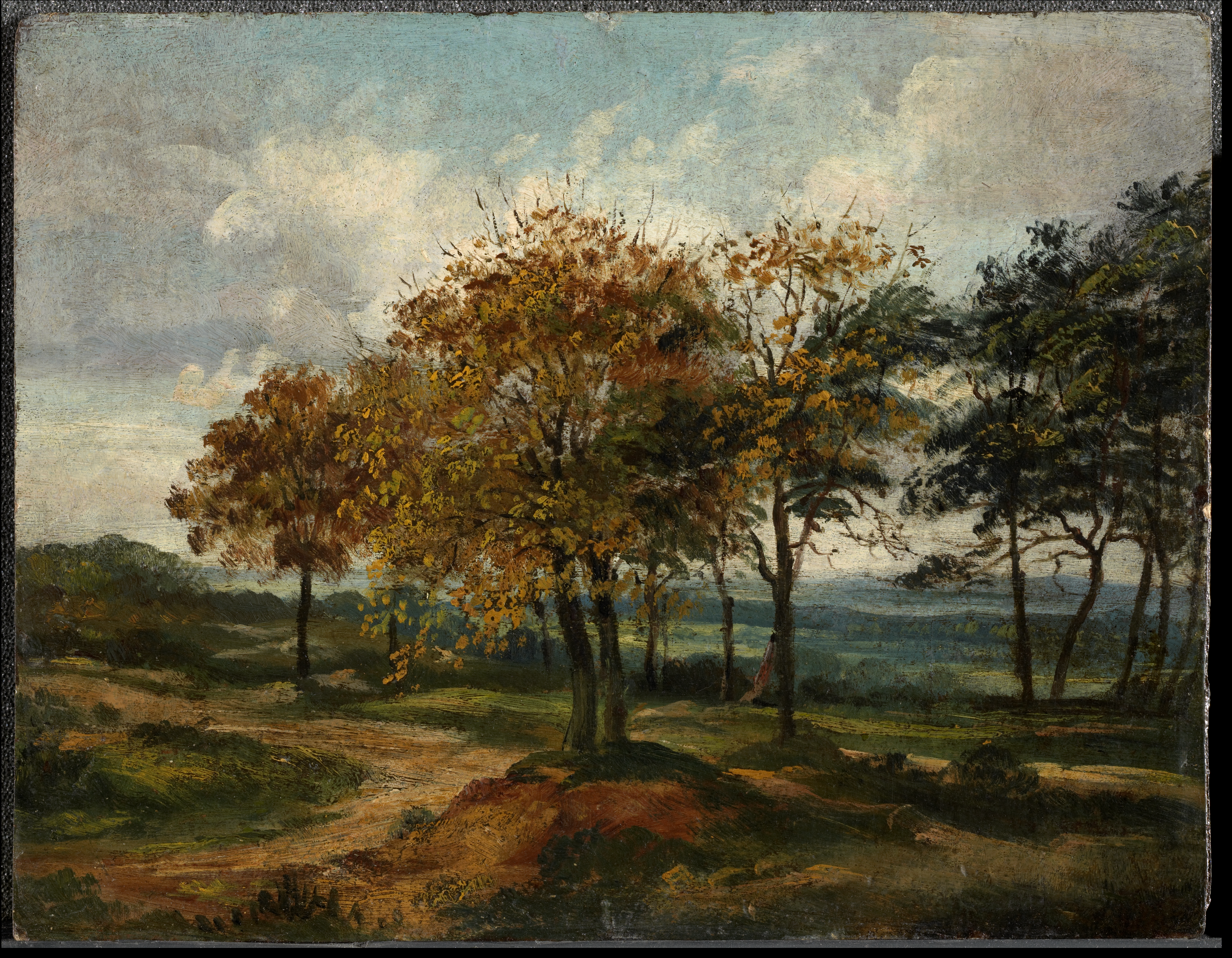
River Valley (recto); Wooded Landscape (verso), after 1830, oil on wood-pulp board. Clark Art Institute, gift of the Manton Art Foundation in memory of Sir Edwin and Lady Manton

Thomas Churchyard (born Melton, near Woodbridge, Suffolk in 1798, died 1865) was an English lawyer and painter of Woodbridge. He was trained as a solicitor, and worked in the law for many years, but his real interest was landscape painting. He married Harriet Hailes of Melton in 1825, and they had two sons and six daughters who survived to adulthood (but none of whom prospered). Thomas was a long-term friend of Edward FitzGerald, the translator of Omar Khayyam's Rubaiyat.
