= Art Atkinson =

Australian rules footballer

Personal information
- Full name: Arthur George Atkinson
- Born: 2 April 1878; South Melbourne, Victoria
- Died: 7 August 1943 (aged 65); Sunbury, Victoria
- Original team: Collegians

Playing career^{1}
Years	Club	Games (Goals)
1898	Melbourne	4 (1)
- ^{1} Playing statistics correct to the end of 1898.

Arthur George Atkinson (2 April 1878 – 7 August 1943) was an Australian rules footballer who played for the Melbourne Football Club in the Victorian Football League (VFL).
