= Mark Cumming =

Australian rules footballer

Personal information
- Full name: Mark Cumming
- Born: 27 July 1872; St Kilda, Victoria
- Died: 10 March 1939 (aged 66); Maylands, Western Australia
- Original team: Perth

Playing career^{1}
Years	Club	Games (Goals)
1898	St Kilda	4 (0)
- ^{1} Playing statistics correct to the end of 1898.

Mark Cumming (27 July 1872 – 10 March 1939) was an Australian rules footballer who played with St Kilda in the Victorian Football League (VFL).

== Family ==
The son of Robert Cumming, and Agnes Cumming, née Bennett, Mark Cumming was born on 27 July 1872. He married Augusta Emily Willaton (1875–1947) in 1912.
