= Tommy O'Day =

Australian rules footballer

Personal information
- Full name: Thomas O'Day
- Born: 8 October 1873; North Melbourne, Victoria
- Died: 2 September 1905 (aged 31); Hotham West, Victoria
- Original team: North Melbourne
- Debut: Round 1, 1898, Carlton vs. South Melbourne, at Princes Park

Playing career
Years	Club	Games (Goals)
1893–96	North Melbourne (VFA)	56 (13)
1896–97	Fremantle (WAFA)	
1898	Carlton	13 (8)

Thomas O'Day (8 October 1873 – 2 September 1905) was an Australian rules footballer who played for North Melbourne in the Victorian Football Association (VFA). He then played for Fremantle in the West Australian Football Association (WAFA), and then for Carlton in the Victorian Football League (VFL).

== Football ==
O'Day made his debut for the Carlton Football Club in Round 1 of the 1898 season. He was only with Carlton for the single season, playing 13 games and kicking 8 goals. The 8 goals he kicked made him the club's leading goal-kicker for that year—the lowest leading goal tally in the club's history.

== Death ==
O'Day died on 2 September 1905 from heart failure after having been ill for several months.

== See also ==
- The Footballers' Alphabet
