= George Hunter (Australian footballer) =

Australian rules footballer

Personal information
- Full name: George Henry Hunter
- Born: 1 February 1874; St Kilda, Victoria
- Died: 18 April 1944 (aged 70); Prahran, Victoria
- Original team: Richmond City

Playing career^{1}
Years	Club	Games (Goals)
1898	St Kilda	1 (0)
- ^{1} Playing statistics correct to the end of 1898.

George Henry Hunter (1 February 1874 – 18 April 1944) was an Australian rules footballer who played with St Kilda in the Victorian Football League (VFL).
