= George Stewart (footballer, born 1873) =

Australian rules footballer

Personal information
- Full name: George William Stewart
- Born: 21 November 1873; Prahran, Victoria
- Died: 27 May 1937 (aged 63); Hawthorn, Victoria
- Original team: South Yarra

Playing career^{1}
Years	Club	Games (Goals)
1898–1900	St Kilda	29 (3)
- ^{1} Playing statistics correct to the end of 1900.

George William Stewart (21 November 1873 – 27 May 1937) was an Australian rules footballer who played with St Kilda in the Victorian Football League (VFL).
