= R.J. O'Donnell =

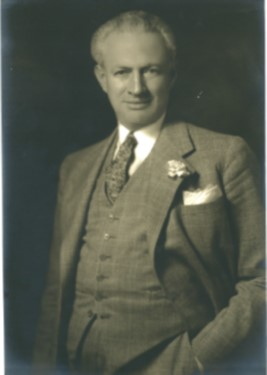
R.J. O'Donnell, VP & General Manager of Interstate Theater Circuit, c.1940

Robert J. O'Donnell (1891–1959) was an American businessman and philanthropist who, with partner Karl Hoblitzelle, managed the Interstate Theater chain as vice president and general manager from 1925 until his death from lung cancer in 1959. O'Donnell is best known for helping facilitate the growth of the "Majestic" chain of theaters during the "classical Hollywood narrative" and later for his philanthropic work both with the Variety Club Children's Charity and the Robert J. O'Donnell Film Series Endowment Fund for the Dallas Museum of Fine Arts.

American comedian and actor Bob Hope credits O'Donnell as the person who gave him his "big break into show business" in Hope's autobiography Have Tux, Will Travel. O'Donnell was also instrumental in beginning the acting career of Audie Murphy. While working as a theater usher at the age of twelve in his hometown of Chicago, O'Donnell survived the infamous Iroquois Theatre fire, the deadliest theater fire and the deadliest single-building fire in United States history; it killed 605 people.

== Early life ==
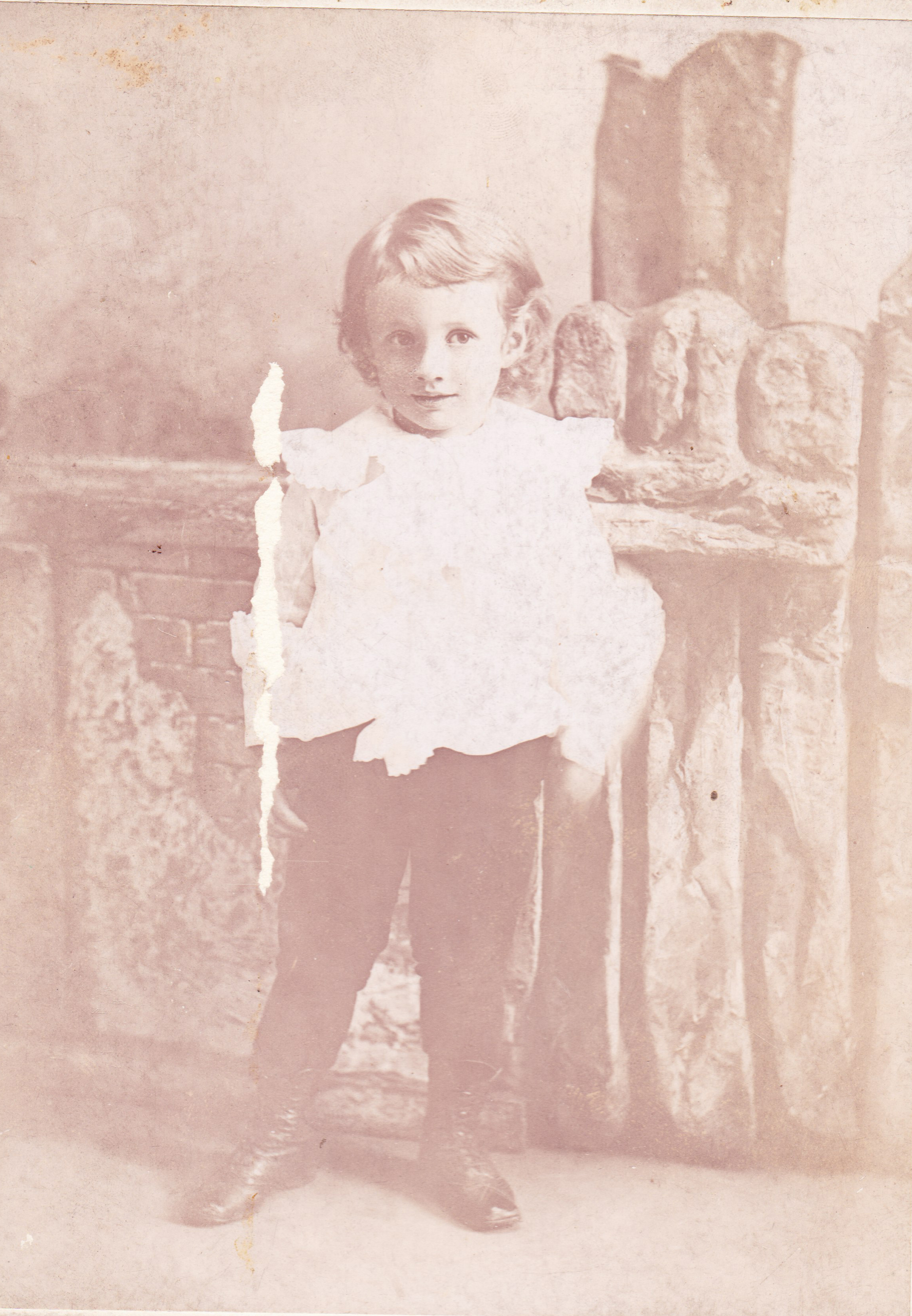
R.J. O'Donnell Age 4, Chicago c.1895

R.J. O'Donnell was born in Chicago Ward 25, Cook County, Illinois on October 6, 1891 to Robert Emmett O'Donnell and Emma Megler O'Donnell, themselves children of Irish immigrants from County Donegal, Ireland. O'Donnell was the second born of five children. His siblings were Margaurette (b. July 1889), Maria (b. January 1894), Gerald (b. May 1896) and William (b. October 1898). As a child, O'Donnell attended the Fuller School on 41st Street in Chicago. However, at age twelve he began his career in show business as an usher at both the Old Chicago Opera House and the Iroquois Theatre.

The act headlining on the day of the tragic Iroquois Theater fire on December 30, 1903, was Eddie Foy and the Seven Little Foys, the First Family of American Vaudeville Theater. Future Warner Bros. producer Bryan Foy became one of O'Donnell's closest friends during his time at the Interstate Theater Circuit.

The death of his father in 1910 pushed R.J. into seeking greater roles of responsibility. As a result of the immediate financial strain, his family began taking on boarders from Pennsylvania to help with expenses. It was his Chicago theater contacts that would secure him a position on Broadway in New York City.

== Career ==
=== New York City ===
Through a trusted Chicago contact, Lew Wiswell, O'Donnell secured a position as assistant treasurer of the Orpheum Theater on Broadway, in New York in 1911. He later stated that it was during this period that he perfected both his money management skills and showmanship. At this position, O'Donnell was earning enough to be able to put money away into savings as well as send cash home to his family's household in Chicago. After two years, O'Donnell decided that he wanted to open his own theater. He took his savings and pooled it with that of a local friend, Al Malone, and started an open-air theater in Newberg, New York. It failed. In a later interview in 1941, he recalls "the citizens of Newberg were not at all stupefied at such a venture and in fact, were so unimpressed that they managed to stay away in large numbers".

=== Interstate Theaters ===
O'Donnell went back to Broadway to work as a booking agent for several more years, establishing contacts and learning the business side of show business. In 1924, O'Donnell was introduced to Karl Hoblitzelle of Dallas, Texas, the owner of Interstate Amusements, a Missouri company that Hoblitzelle started with $1500 in 1905. Hoblitzelle offered O'Donnell a job as the manager of the fledgling Majestic Theater in Fort Worth, Texas.

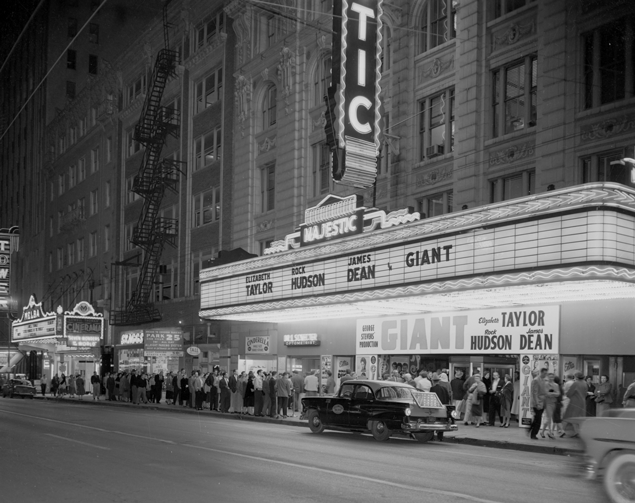
Majestic Theater, Dallas Texas, c.1950

In 1925, Hoblitzelle appointed O'Donnell as general operating manager for all of the Majestic Theaters in Dallas, San Antonio, Houston and Fort Worth. By 1933, O'Donnell had set up his permanent offices in the Majestic Theater in Downtown, Dallas Texas.

O'Donnell faced many challenges during this time period such as finding suitable tenants for commercial space connected with theater buildings, especially during the depression years; contracting for Mexican made Spanish language films for theaters in the “Valley” of Texas which catered to the Mexican population; developing a reliable popcorn supply and managing to get it shipped to theaters, a particular problem in wartime (Interstate even subsidized popcorn research by Texas A&M to solve this particular problem); creating exciting promotional gimmicks to entice customers into the theaters while staying one step ahead of the state lottery laws; dealing with the advent of the television, at first seen as a mortal enemy; adjusting to population movement to the suburbs and the building of theaters outside of the downtown area; building and promoting drive-ins in the late 1940s; coping with the declining amounts of film production available for exhibitors and the economic difficulties created for theater management by the beginnings of unionism and the minimum wage law; and combating local censorship laws as films became more "violent".

At his peak output, O'Donnell presided over more than 200 separate movie theaters scattered across the Midwest. Quoting directly from the source, in 1941 he was called by the Hollywood producers that were making movies “the # 1 exhibitor in the United States”. The producers on Broadway spoke of him as an "outside sizzler" and remember him as one of the Bright Belt's best dressed theater men. Organized charities across the United States called him a "port in any storm". And every employee of the Interstate Circuit called him simply "The Boss with a heart of Irish gold".

=== Bob Hope ===
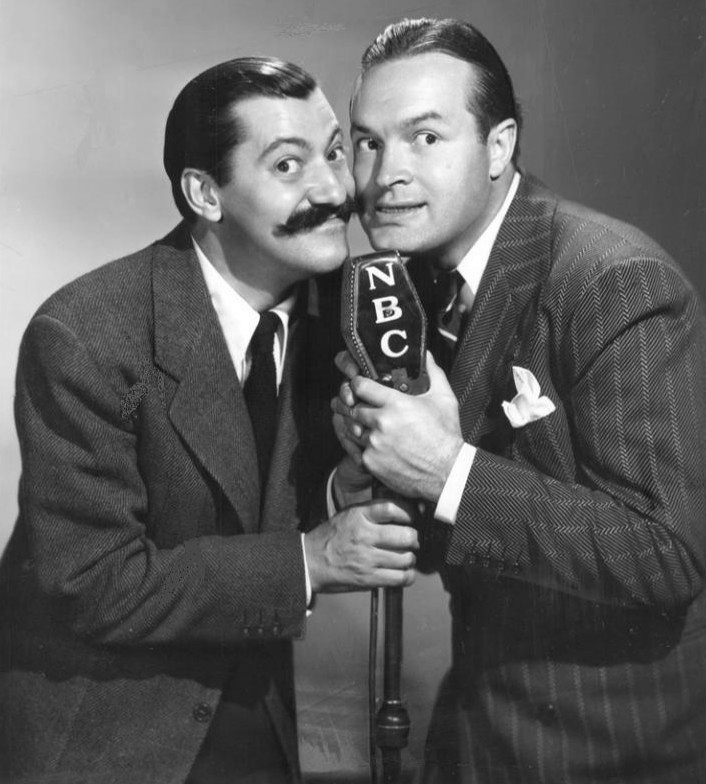
Bob Hope, c.1940

In 1929, a young Bob Hope appeared at the Interstate-Time club in Fort Worth, Texas to perform his witty, rapid-fire brand of comedy that came to define his style. Hope wasn't receiving the intended audience response to his material. Immediately after the show, O'Donnell told him that he needed to slow down his material while in Texas. Hope admits to working less

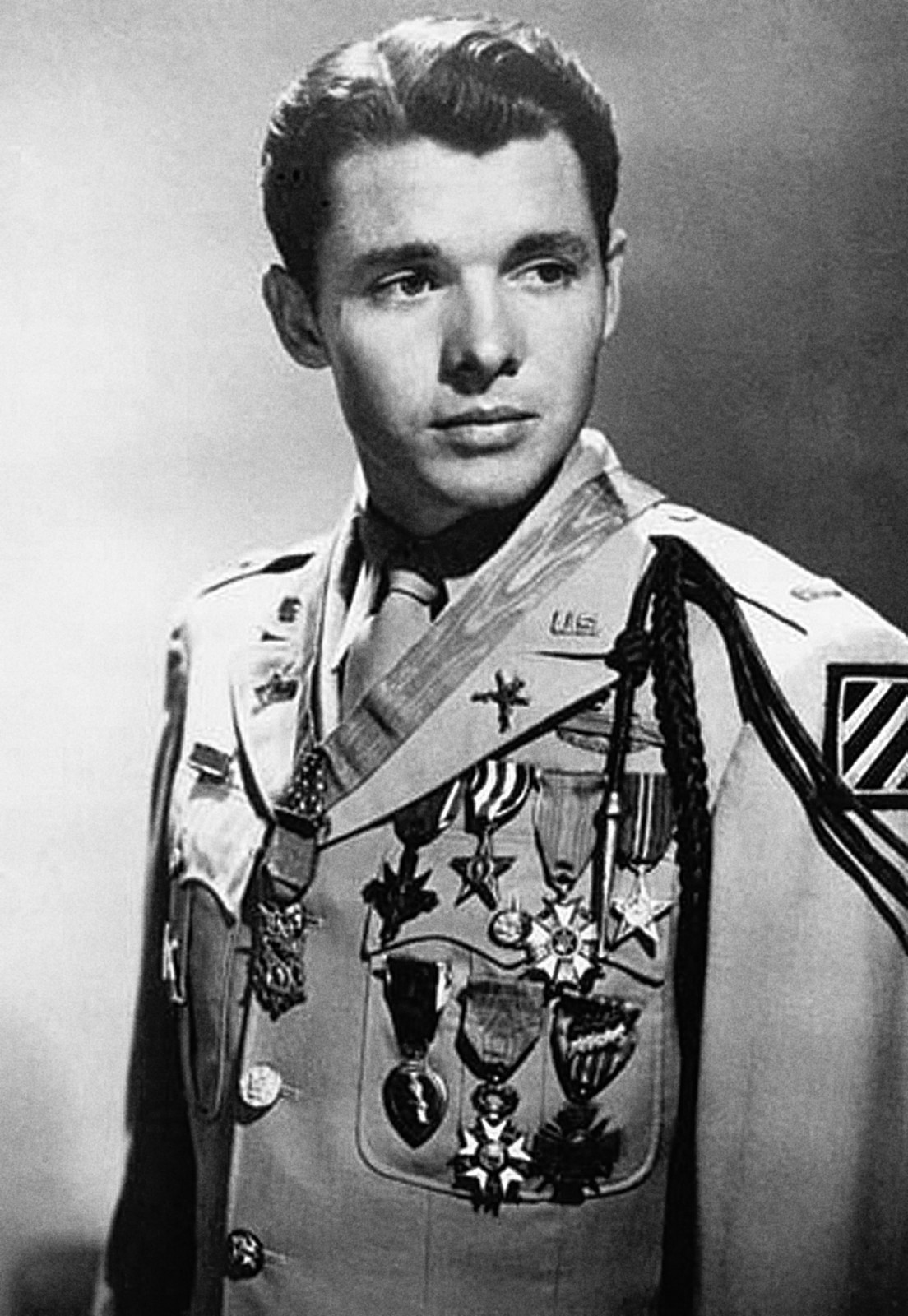
Audie Murphy, c.1945

abrasively after that and claimed that “it was a real turning point for me". Hope pushed on performing through August 1929 and while in Charleston received a telegram from New York. R.J. O'Donnell had telegraphed one of his contacts, a man named Lee Stewart on Broadway and urged him to sign Hope immediately and that his material was great and that he was impressed with his talent.

=== Audie Murphy ===
Audie Murphy's first taste of show business came in Dallas. He had just returned from the war in 1945 and had been written about in Life magazine with his picture on its cover, when R.J. O'Donnell still at Interstate Theaters, suggested that he be interviewed on a regular Sunday Interstate broadcast called "Show Time". O'Donnell called friend James Cagney in Hollywood, and the actor was instrumental in getting Murphy two-bit parts as his first tryout in movies. Paul Short of Dallas then signed him to a contract, coming out with Murphy's first starring role in "Bad Boy". The contract was later sold to Universal-International Studios where he made most of his movies.

=== The Alamo ===
In June 1951, amid considerable publicity that John Wayne and Republic Pictures would film "The Alamo" in Mexico City due to economic considerations, O'Donnell, Jesse Jones (Texas politician, publisher of the Houston Chronicle, entrepreneur and Secretary of Commerce under Franklin Roosevelt) and others went so far as to contact Herbert Yates, President of Republic to try and dissuade them from doing so. "To make the story of the Alamo in Mexico would be disastrous, in my opinion, and would be like making the story of Bunker Hill or the Liberty Bell in Philadelphia or any other of our patriotic stories in a foreign country," O'Donnell implored. By October of that year, the outrage of this direction was so great that Wayne had a change of heart and "The Alamo" was in fact filmed in Texas.

=== Later life ===
An avid cigarette smoker, R.J. O'Donnell died on November 10, 1959, in Dallas, Texas, after an unsuccessful surgery to remove a recently discovered tumor in his right lung. The official cause of death is stated as lung cancer.

== Legacy and philanthropy ==
=== The Variety Club of Dallas ===
The Variety Club of Dallas was started in 1935 after Claude Ezell, one of Texas' leading showmen, made a suggestion to a group of business associates that they should apply for a Variety Club Charter. Its goal was that children who were affected by poverty, abuse, neglect as well as those with illnesses and disabilities should be given the same opportunities other children had within their communities.

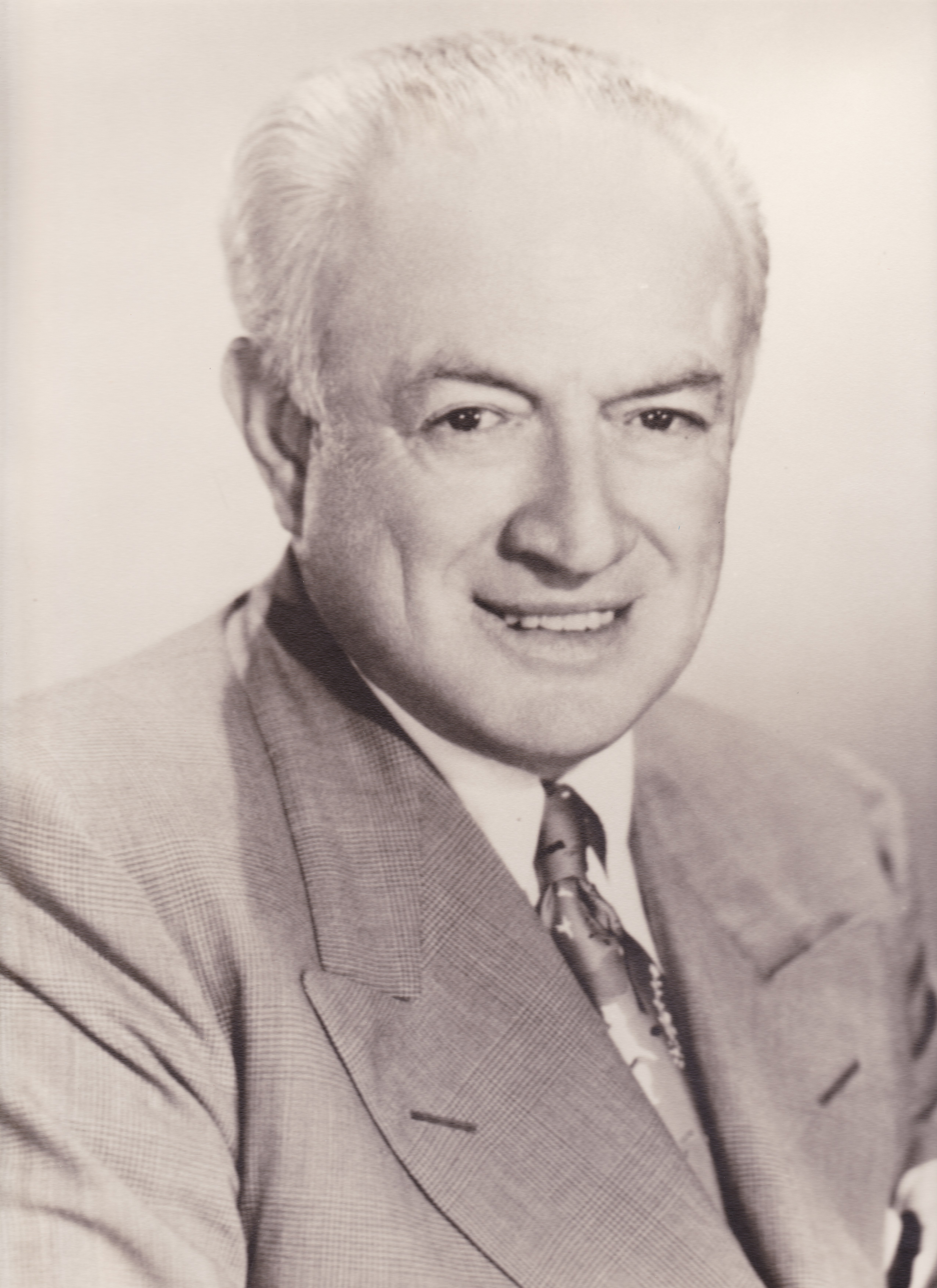
R.J. O'Donnell, Dallas, Texas, c.1950

Within the Aldolphus Hotel, J.B. Dugger, Buddy Harris, C.E. Hilger, Mike Rice, Harold Robb, Paul Scott, J.B. “Jack” and W.G. “Bill” Underwood, Wallace Walthall, Ed Wilson and R.J. O'Donnell became the eleven charter members for the Club. They were soon joined by other Dallas business leaders such as Skipper Cherry, John Rowley and Julius Schepps.

=== The Dallas Museum of Fine Arts R.J. O'Donnell Endowment Fund ===
O'Donnell and his spouse Vinnie Lorraine Pearson reportedly discussed on numerous occasions contributing to the community that "had given them so much". After O'Donnell's death from lung cancer in 1959, Pearson bequeathed an endowment of more than $1 million to the Dallas Museum of Fine Arts under the conditions that the fund be used for the presentation of films and film related educational programs. At the time of the endowment, it was the DMFA's largest contribution from a non-corporation entity to date. Later, while visiting family in Dallas in 1982, Pearson contributed an additional $200,000 to the DMFA in memory of O'Donnell. Today, the fund can still be found credited on Dallas Museum of Art literature and advertisements regarding local film festivals and educational programs.

=== Will Rogers Memorial Hospital and R.J. O'Donnell Research Laboratory ===
National Vaudeville Artist Lodge is a historic tuberculosis sanatorium located at Saranac Lake in Essex County, New York. It was built in 1928 by the National Vaudeville Artists association, who previously sent patients to the Kennedy Cottage and other Cure Cottages around Saranac Lake. After the death of R.J. O'Donnell in 1959, former partner Karl Hoblitzelle dedicated a new wing of the hospital as the O'Donnell Research Laboratory. In its day, the facility provided healthcare free of charge to those that worked in the entertainment and amusement industry.
