= Mick Pender =

Australian rules footballer

Personal information
- Full name: Michael Pender
- Born: 17 November 1868; Williamstown, Victoria
- Died: 23 November 1924 (aged 56); Kensington, Victoria
- Original team: Wellington

Playing career^{1}
| Years | Club | Games (Goals) |
| 1898 | Carlton | 1 (0) |
- ^{1} Playing statistics correct to the end of 1898.

Mick Pender (17 November 1868 – 23 November 1924) was an Australian rules footballer who played with Carlton in the Victorian Football League (VFL).
