= Jim Balharry =

Australian rules footballer (1868–1958)

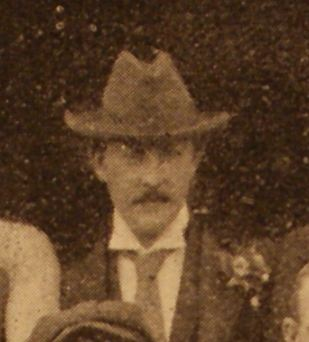
- Balharry in 1898

Personal information
- Full name: James Fenton Balharry
- Born: 13 May 1868; Williamstown, Victoria
- Died: 2 September 1958 (aged 90); Kew, Victoria
- Original team: Carlton Juniors

Playing career^{1}
| Years | Club | Games (Goals) |
| 1893–1896 | Carlton (VFA) | 71 (19) |
| 1898 | Carlton | 1 (0) |
| Total | | 72 (19) |
- ^{1} Playing statistics correct to the end of 1898.

Jim Balharry (13 May 1868 – 2 September 1958) was an Australian rules footballer who played with Carlton in the VFA and Victorian Football League (VFL).
