= Alf Clauscen =

Australian rules footballer (1875–1948)

Personal information
- Full name: Alfred Asmussen Clauscen
- Born: 27 May 1875; Abbotsford, Victoria
- Died: 22 August 1948 (aged 73); Abbotsford, Victoria
- Original team: Montague Juniors

Playing career^{1}
Years	Club	Games (Goals)
1898	St Kilda	2 (0)
- ^{1} Playing statistics correct to the end of 1898.

Alfred Asmussen Clauscen (27 May 1875 – 22 August 1948) was an Australian rules footballer who played for the St Kilda Football Club in the Victorian Football League (VFL).
