= Dick Stewart (Australian footballer) =

Australian rules footballer

Personal information
- Full name: Richard McRae Stewart
- Born: 18 March 1873; Beechworth, Victoria
- Died: 28 September 1933 (aged 60); Caulfield, Victoria
- Original team: Carlton (VFA)

Playing career^{1}
Years	Club	Games (Goals)
1898–1900	Carlton	6 (0)
- ^{1} Playing statistics correct to the end of 1900.

Richard McRae Stewart (18 March 1873 – 28 September 1933) was an Australian rules footballer who played with Carlton in the Victorian Football League (VFL).
