= Jim McArthur (Australian footballer) =

Australian rules footballer

Personal information
- Full name: James McArthur
- Born: 13 July 1870; South Melbourne, Victoria
- Died: 6 February 1937 (aged 66); Mont Park, Victoria

Playing career^{1}
Years	Club	Games (Goals)
1898	South Melbourne	1 (0)
- ^{1} Playing statistics correct to the end of 1898.

Jim McArthur (13 July 1870 – 6 February 1937) was an Australian rules footballer who played with South Melbourne in the Victorian Football League (VFL).
