= Bill Churchyard =

Australian rules footballer

Personal information
- Full name: William John Churchyard
- Born: 2 February 1878; Carlton, Victoria
- Died: 31 August 1957 (aged 79); Caulfield, Victoria
- Original team: Melbourne Juniors / Royal Park

Playing career^{1}
Years	Club	Games (Goals)
1898–99	Carlton	10 (4)
- ^{1} Playing statistics correct to the end of 1899.

William John Churchyard (2 February 1878 – 31 August 1957) was an Australian rules footballer who played with Carlton in the Victorian Football League (VFL).
