= Laurie Pender =

Australian rules footballer

Personal information
- Full name: Peter Lawrence John Aloysius Pender
- Born: 23 July 1887; Footscray, Victoria
- Died: 1 November 1966 (aged 79); Orford, Victoria
- Height: 180 cm (5 ft 11 in)
- Weight: 74 kg (163 lb)

Playing career^{1}
Years	Club	Games (Goals)
1912	Geelong	13 (0)
- ^{1} Playing statistics correct to the end of 1912.

Peter Lawrence John Aloysius Pender (23 July 1887 – 1 November 1966) was an Australian rules footballer who played with Geelong in the Victorian Football League (VFL).
