= Walter Stewart (footballer) =

Australian rules footballer

Personal information
- Full name: Walter Percival Horace Stewart
- Born: 15 April 1875; Prahran, Victoria
- Died: 25 March 1926 (aged 50); Brighton, Victoria
- Original team: Middle Park

Playing career^{1}
Years	Club	Games (Goals)
1898, 1900	St Kilda	10 (1)
1905	Geelong	2 (0)
Total		12 (1)
- ^{1} Playing statistics correct to the end of 1805.

Walter Percival Horace Stewart (15 April 1875 – 25 March 1926) was an Australian rules footballer who played with St Kilda and Geelong in the Victorian Football League (VFL).
