= Tom Davey (footballer, born 1876) =

Australian rules footballer (1876–1907)

Personal information
- Full name: Thomas James Davey
- Born: 30 March 1876; South Melbourne, Victoria
- Died: 4 September 1907 (aged 31); South Melbourne, Victoria
- Original team: Hawthorn (VJFA)

Playing career^{1}
Years	Club	Games (Goals)
1898	Melbourne	8 (0)
- ^{1} Playing statistics correct to the end of 1898.

Thomas James Davey (30 March 1876 – 4 September 1907) was an Australian rules footballer who played with Melbourne in the Victorian Football League (VFL).
