= Bob O'Donnell (footballer) =

Australian rules footballer

Personal information
- Full name: Robert Thomas O'Donnell
- Born: 23 April 1870; Murtoa, Victoria
- Died: 20 March 1940 (aged 69); East Melbourne, Victoria

Playing career^{1}
Years	Club	Games (Goals)
1898	South Melbourne	3 (2)
- ^{1} Playing statistics correct to the end of 1898.

Robert Thomas O'Donnell (23 April 1870 – 20 March 1940) was an Australian rules footballer who played with South Melbourne in the Victorian Football League (VFL).
