= Dan Pender =

Australian rules footballer

Personal information
- Full name: Daniel Emmett Pender
- Born: 17 March 1873; Williamstown, Victoria
- Died: 14 April 1968 (aged 95); Albert Park, Victoria
- Original team: Wellington

Playing career^{1}
| Years | Club | Games (Goals) |
| 1898 | Carlton | 4 (0) |
- ^{1} Playing statistics correct to the end of 1898.

Daniel Emmett Pender (17 March 1873 – 14 April 1968) was an Australian rules footballer who played with Carlton in the Victorian Football League (VFL).
