= Pat Considine =

Australian rules footballer

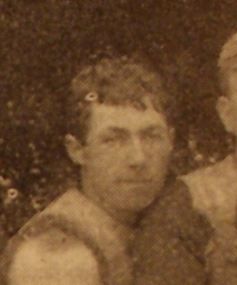
- Considine during his Carlton career

Personal information
- Full name: Patrick James Considine
- Nickname: Dido
- Born: 30 September 1875; North Melbourne, Victoria
- Died: 20 June 1918 (aged 42); Cheltenham, Victoria
- Original team: West Melbourne
- Position: Follower

Playing career^{1}
Years	Club	Games (Goals)
1898–1901	Carlton	48 (12)
- ^{1} Playing statistics correct to the end of 1901.

Patrick James Considine (30 September 1875 – 20 June 1918) was an Australian rules footballer who played with Carlton in the Victorian Football League (VFL).
