= 1898 VFL season =

Second season of the Victorian Football League (VFL)

1898 VFL premiership season
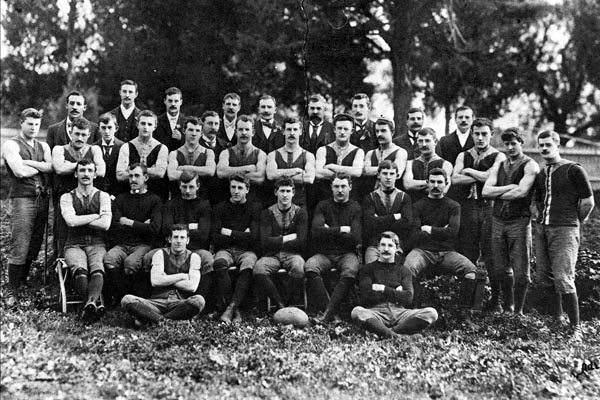
- Fitzroy 1898 VFL premiership team
- Date: 14 May – 24 September 1898
- Teams: 8
- Premiers: Fitzroy; 1st premiership
- Minor premiers: Essendon; 1st minor premiership
- Leading goalkicker medallist: Archie Smith (Collingwood); 31 goals
- Matches played: 70

The 1898 VFL season was the second season of the Victorian Football League (VFL), the highest-level senior Australian rules football competition in Victoria. The season featured eight clubs and ran from 14 May to 24 September, comprising a 14-round home-and-away season followed by a finals series featuring all eight clubs.

Fitzroy won the premiership, defeating Essendon by 15 points in the 1898 VFL grand final; it was Fitzroy's first VFL premiership. Essendon won the minor premiership by finishing atop the home-and-away ladder with an 11–3 win–loss record. Collingwood's Archie Smith won the leading goalkicker medal as the league's leading goalkicker.

== Background ==
In 1898, the VFL competition consisted of eight teams of 20 on-the-field players each, with no "reserves" (although any of the 20 players who had left the playing field for any reason could later resume their place on the field at any time during the match).

Each team played each other twice in a home-and-away season of 14 rounds.

Once the 14 round home-and-away season had finished, the 1898 VFL Premiers were determined by the specific format and conventions of the 1898 VFL finals system.

== Home-and-away season ==
=== Round 1 ===
	Round 1
Saturday, 14 May (3:00 pm)	Carlton 6.11 (47)	def.	South Melbourne 3.12 (30)	Princes Park	Report
Saturday, 14 May (3:00 pm)	Collingwood 7.6 (48)	def.	Geelong 3.9 (27)	Victoria Park	Report
Saturday, 14 May (3:00 pm)	Essendon 10.10 (70)	def.	Fitzroy 2.5 (17)	EMCG	Report
Saturday, 14 May (3:00 pm)	St Kilda 2.4 (16)	def. by	Melbourne 13.14 (92)	Junction Oval	Report

=== Round 2 ===
	Round 2
Saturday, 21 May (3:00 pm)	Melbourne 12.11 (83)	def.	Carlton 4.2 (26)	MCG	Report
Saturday, 21 May (3:00 pm)	Fitzroy 7.6 (48)	def.	Collingwood 5.6 (36)	Brunswick Street Oval	Report
Saturday, 21 May (3:00 pm)	South Melbourne 3.9 (27)	def. by	Essendon 5.8 (38)	Lake Oval	Report
Saturday, 21 May (3:00 pm)	Geelong 11.19 (85)	def.	St Kilda 2.5 (17)	Corio Oval	Report

=== Round 3 ===
	Round 3
Tuesday, 24 May (3:00 pm)	Carlton 2.4 (16)	def. by	Essendon 4.4 (28)	Princes Park	Report
Tuesday, 24 May (3:00 pm)	Melbourne 6.10 (46)	def.	Collingwood 5.6 (36)	MCG	Report
Tuesday, 24 May (3:00 pm)	St Kilda 2.4 (16)	def. by	Fitzroy 7.11 (53)	Junction Oval	Report
Tuesday, 24 May (3:00 pm)	Geelong 7.18 (60)	def.	South Melbourne 1.2 (8)	Corio Oval	Report

=== Round 4 ===
	Round 4
Saturday, 28 May (3:00 pm)	Carlton 4.5 (29)	def. by	Geelong 3.12 (30)	Princes Park	Report
Saturday, 28 May (3:00 pm)	South Melbourne 7.11 (53)	def.	Collingwood 6.6 (42)	Lake Oval	Report
Saturday, 28 May (3:00 pm)	Essendon 16.16 (112)	def.	St Kilda 5.7 (37)	EMCG	Report
Saturday, 28 May (3:00 pm)	Fitzroy 4.14 (38)	def.	Melbourne 2.7 (19)	Brunswick Street Oval	Report

=== Round 5 ===
	Round 5
Saturday, 4 June (3:00 pm)	Collingwood 6.12 (48)	def.	Carlton 0.6 (6)	Victoria Park	Report
Saturday, 4 June (3:00 pm)	Essendon 6.12 (48)	def.	Melbourne 3.5 (23)	EMCG	Report
Saturday, 4 June (3:00 pm)	Geelong 4.10 (34)	def. by	Fitzroy 6.3 (39)	Corio Oval	Report
Saturday, 4 June (3:00 pm)	St Kilda 3.3 (21)	def. by	South Melbourne 7.20 (62)	Junction Oval	Report

=== Round 6 ===
	Round 6
Saturday, 11 June (3:00 pm)	Fitzroy 5.7 (37)	def.	Carlton 4.9 (33)	Brunswick Street Oval	Report
Saturday, 11 June (3:00 pm)	St Kilda 5.4 (34)	def. by	Collingwood 10.8 (68)	Junction Oval	Report
Saturday, 11 June (3:00 pm)	Geelong 4.7 (31)	def.	Essendon 3.6 (24)	Corio Oval	Report
Saturday, 11 June (3:00 pm)	Melbourne 1.7 (13)	def. by	South Melbourne 2.3 (15)	MCG	Report

=== Round 7 ===
	Round 7
Saturday, 18 June (3:00 pm)	Carlton 5.13 (43)	def.	St Kilda 5.3 (33)	Princes Park	Report
Saturday, 18 June (3:00 pm)	Collingwood 5.10 (40)	def.	Essendon 3.2 (20)	Victoria Park	Report
Saturday, 18 June (3:00 pm)	South Melbourne 7.9 (51)	def.	Fitzroy 2.10 (22)	Lake Oval	Report
Saturday, 18 June (3:00 pm)	Melbourne 9.5 (59)	def.	Geelong 5.9 (39)	MCG	Report

=== Round 8 ===
	Round 8
Saturday, 25 June (3:00 pm)	South Melbourne 6.8 (44)	def.	Carlton 1.6 (12)	Lake Oval	Report
Saturday, 25 June (3:00 pm)	Geelong 6.5 (41)	def.	Collingwood 2.10 (22)	Corio Oval	Report
Saturday, 25 June (3:00 pm)	Fitzroy 2.4 (16)	def. by	Essendon 8.11 (59)	Brunswick Street Oval	Report
Saturday, 25 June (3:00 pm)	Melbourne 5.15 (45)	def.	St Kilda 3.3 (21)	MCG	Report

=== Round 9 ===
	Round 9
Saturday, 9 July (3:00 pm)	Carlton 4.4 (28)	drew with	Melbourne 3.10 (28)	Princes Park	Report
Saturday, 9 July (3:00 pm)	Collingwood 4.11 (35)	def.	Fitzroy 3.5 (23)	Victoria Park	Report
Saturday, 9 July (3:00 pm)	Essendon 7.12 (54)	def.	South Melbourne 4.6 (30)	EMCG	Report
Saturday, 9 July (3:00 pm)	St Kilda 3.7 (25)	def. by	Geelong 13.15 (93)	Junction Oval	Report

=== Round 10 ===
	Round 10
Saturday, 16 July (3:00 pm)	Essendon 10.17 (77)	def.	Carlton 1.3 (9)	EMCG	Report
Saturday, 16 July (3:00 pm)	Collingwood 8.11 (59)	def.	Melbourne 1.5 (11)	Victoria Park	Report
Saturday, 16 July (3:00 pm)	Fitzroy 9.13 (67)	def.	St Kilda 3.1 (19)	Brunswick Street Oval	Report
Saturday, 16 July (3:00 pm)	South Melbourne 1.3 (9)	def. by	Geelong 3.11 (29)	Lake Oval	Report

=== Round 11 ===
	Round 11
Saturday, 23 July (3:00 pm)	Geelong 8.10 (58)	def.	Carlton 5.2 (32)	Corio Oval	Report
Saturday, 23 July (3:00 pm)	Collingwood 10.13 (73)	def.	South Melbourne 1.7 (13)	Victoria Park	Report
Saturday, 23 July (3:00 pm)	St Kilda 1.9 (15)	def. by	Essendon 10.11 (71)	Junction Oval	Report
Saturday, 23 July (3:00 pm)	Melbourne 5.3 (33)	def. by	Fitzroy 7.8 (50)	MCG	Report

=== Round 12 ===
	Round 12
Saturday, 30 July (3:00 pm)	Carlton 1.4 (10)	def. by	Collingwood 3.11 (29)	Princes Park	Report
Saturday, 30 July (3:00 pm)	Melbourne 2.8 (20)	def. by	Essendon 11.9 (75)	MCG	Report
Saturday, 30 July (3:00 pm)	Fitzroy 5.9 (39)	def.	Geelong 4.6 (30)	Brunswick Street Oval	Report
Saturday, 30 July (3:00 pm)	South Melbourne 12.15 (87)	def.	St Kilda 3.6 (24)	Lake Oval	Report

=== Round 13 ===
	Round 13
Saturday, 13 August (3:00 pm)	Carlton 3.4 (22)	def. by	Fitzroy 8.6 (54)	Princes Park	Report
Saturday, 13 August (3:00 pm)	Collingwood 8.17 (65)	def.	St Kilda 1.0 (6)	Victoria Park	Report
Saturday, 13 August (3:00 pm)	Essendon 7.13 (55)	def.	Geelong 5.7 (37)	EMCG	Report
Saturday, 13 August(3:00 pm)	South Melbourne 6.7 (51)	def.	Melbourne 5.8 (38)	Lake Oval	Report

=== Round 14 ===
	Round 14
Saturday, 20 August (3:00 pm)	St Kilda 8.7 (55)	def. by	Carlton 10.9 (69)	Junction Oval	Report
Saturday, 20 August (3:00 pm)	Essendon 2.13 (25)	def. by	Collingwood 7.14 (56)	EMCG	Report
Saturday, 20 August (3:00 pm)	Fitzroy 9.11 (65)	def.	South Melbourne 1.4 (10)	Brunswick Street Oval	Report
Saturday, 20 August (3:00 pm)	Geelong 7.9 (51)	def.	Melbourne 2.7 (19)	Corio Oval	Report

== Ladder ==
(P)	Premiers
	Section A
	Section B

#	Team	P	W	L	D	PF	PA	%	Pts
1	Essendon	14	11	3	0	756	374	202.1	44
2	Collingwood	14	10	4	0	657	363	181.0	40
3	Fitzroy (P)	14	10	4	0	568	467	121.6	40
4	Geelong	14	9	5	0	645	425	151.8	36
5	South Melbourne	14	7	7	0	482	538	89.6	28
6	Melbourne	14	5	8	1	529	545	97.1	22
7	Carlton	14	3	10	1	382	634	60.3	14
8	St Kilda	14	0	14	0	339	1012	33.5	0

Rules for classification: 1. premiership points; 2. percentage; 3. points for
Average score: 38.9
Source: AFL Tables

== Progression by round ==
Points by round
Team ╲ Round	1	2	3	4	5	6	7	8	9	10	11	12	13	14
Essendon	4	8	12	16	20	20	20	24	28	32	36	40	44	44
Collingwood	4	4	4	4	8	12	16	16	20	24	28	32	36	40
Fitzroy	0	4	8	12	16	20	20	20	20	24	28	32	36	40
Geelong	0	4	8	12	12	16	16	20	24	28	32	32	32	36
South Melbourne	0	0	0	4	8	12	16	20	20	20	20	24	28	28
Melbourne	4	8	12	12	12	12	16	20	22	22	22	22	22	22
Carlton	4	4	4	4	4	4	8	8	10	10	10	10	10	14
St Kilda	0	0	0	0	0	0	0	0	0	0	0	0	0	0

== Finals series ==
The VFL introduced a new system of finals for the 1898 season. The new system, which was used from 1898–1900, allowed all clubs to compete for the major premiership, with the minor premiers having the right to challenge for the premiership.

=== Sectional rounds ===
==== Sectional round 1 ====
	Sectional Round 1
Saturday, 27 August (2:30 pm)	Essendon 9.21 (75)	def.	Carlton 1.2 (8)	EMCG	Report
Saturday, 27 August (2:30 pm)	St Kilda 4.3 (27)	def. by	Collingwood 14.19 (103)	Junction Oval	Report
Saturday, 27 August (2:30 pm)	South Melbourne 5.3 (33)	def. by	Fitzroy 6.11 (47)	Lake Oval	Report
Saturday, 27 August (2:30 pm)	Geelong 11.12 (78)	def.	Melbourne 2.4 (16)	Corio Oval	Report

==== Sectional round 2 ====
	Sectional Round 2
Saturday, 3 September (2:30 pm)	Fitzroy 12.18 (90)	def.	Carlton 1.1 (7)	Brunswick Street Oval	Report
Saturday, 3 September (2:30 pm)	Collingwood 6.9 (45)	def.	Geelong 4.6 (30)	Victoria Park	Report
Saturday, 3 September (2:30 pm)	South Melbourne 3.6 (24)	def. by	Essendon 5.11 (41)	Lake Oval	Report
Saturday, 3 September (2:30 pm)	St Kilda 2.5 (17)	def. by	Melbourne 5.8 (38)	Junction Oval	Report

==== Sectional round 3 ====
	Sectional Round 3
Saturday, 10 September (2:30 pm)	South Melbourne 6.11 (47)	def.	Carlton 3.4 (22)	Lake Oval	Report
Saturday, 10 September (2:30 pm)	Collingwood 7.13 (55)	def.	Melbourne 6.5 (41)	Victoria Park	Report
Saturday, 10 September (2:30 pm)	Fitzroy 5.15 (45)	def.	Essendon 2.4 (16)	Brunswick Street Oval	Report
Saturday, 10 September (2:30 pm)	Geelong 14.18 (102)	def.	St Kilda 4.3 (27)	Corio Oval	Report

==== Section A ladder ====
Qualified for finals

#	Team	P	W	L	D	PF	PA	%	Pts
1	Fitzroy	3	3	0	0	182	56	325.0	12
2	Essendon	3	2	1	0	132	77	171.4	8
3	South Melbourne	3	1	2	0	104	110	94.5	4
4	Carlton	3	0	3	0	37	212	17.5	0

Rules for classification: 1. premiership points; 2. percentage; 3. points for
Source: AFL Tables

==== Section B ladder ====
Qualified for finals

#	Team	P	W	L	D	PF	PA	%	Pts
1	Collingwood	3	3	0	0	203	98	207.1	12
2	Geelong	3	2	1	0	210	88	238.6	8
3	Melbourne	3	1	2	0	95	150	63.3	4
4	St Kilda	3	0	3	0	71	243	29.2	0

Rules for classification: 1. premiership points; 2. percentage; 3. points for
Source: AFL Tables

=== Finals ===
Semi-final
17 September, Brunswick Street Oval
A1	Fitzroy	2.10 (22)
B1	Collingwood	1.5 (11)

Grand final
24 September, Junction Oval
MP	Essendon	3.5 (23)
Fitzroy	5.8 (38)

All starting times are local time. Source: AFL Tables

==== Semi-final ====
	Semi-final
Saturday, 17 September (2:30 pm)	Fitzroy 2.10 (22)	def.	Collingwood 1.5 (11)	Brunswick Street Oval (crowd: 13,120)	Report

==== Grand final ====
	Grand final
Saturday, 24 September (2:50 pm)	Essendon 3.5 (23)	def. by	Fitzroy 5.8 (38)	Junction Oval (crowd: 16,538)	Report

== Win–loss table ==
The following table can be sorted from biggest winning margin to biggest losing margin for each round. If two or more matches in a round are decided by the same margin, these margins are sorted by percentage (i.e. the lowest-scoring winning team is ranked highest and the lowest-scoring losing team is ranked lowest). Opponents are listed above the margins and home matches are in bold.

By winning the minor premiership and accruing at least eight premiership points from its three sectional matches, Essendon won the right to challenge the semi-final winner for the premiership.

+	Win		Qualified for finals
−	Loss		Eliminated
	Draw	X	Bye

Team	Home-and-away season														Home- and-away ladder	Finals series					
Team	Home-and-away season														Home- and-away ladder	Sectional rounds			Sectional ladders	Finals	
Team	1	2	3	4	5	6	7	8	9	10	11	12	13	14	Home- and-away ladder	S1	S2	S3	Sectional ladders	SF	GF
Carlton	**SM** **+17**	MEL −57	**ESS** **−12**	**GEE** **−1**	COL −42	FIT −4	**STK** **+10**	SM −32	**MEL**; **0**	ESS −68	GEE −26	**COL** **−19**	**FIT** **−32**	STK +14	7 (3–10–1)	ESS −67	FIT −83	SM −25	A4 (0–3–0)		
Collingwood	**GEE** **+21**	FIT −12	MEL −10	SM −11	**CAR** **+42**	STK +34	**ESS** **+20**	GEE −19	**FIT** **+12**	**MEL** **+48**	**SM** **+60**	CAR +19	**STK** **+59**	ESS +31	2 (10–4–0)	STK +76	**GEE** **+15**	**MEL** **+14**	B1 (3–0–0)	FIT −11	
Essendon	**FIT** **+53**	SM +11	CAR +12	**STK** **+75**	**MEL** **+25**	GEE −7	COL −20	FIT +43	**SM** **+24**	**CAR** **+68**	STK +56	MEL +55	**GEE** **+18**	**COL** **−31**	1 (11–3–0)	**CAR** **+67**	SM +17	FIT −29	A2 (2–1–0)	X	**FIT** **−15**
Fitzroy	ESS −53	**COL** **+12**	STK +37	**MEL** **+19**	GEE +5	**CAR** **+4**	SM −29	**ESS** **−43**	COL −12	**STK** **+48**	MEL +17	**GEE** **+9**	CAR +32	**SM** **+55**	3 (10–4–0)	SM +14	**CAR** **+83**	**ESS** **+29**	A1 (3–0–0)	**COL** **+11**	ESS +15
Geelong	COL −21	**STK** **+68**	**SM** **+52**	CAR +1	**FIT** **−5**	**ESS** **+7**	MEL −20	**COL** **+19**	STK +68	SM +20	**CAR** **+26**	FIT −9	ESS −18	**MEL** **+32**	4 (9–5–0)	**MEL** **+62**	COL −15	**STK** **+75**	B2 (2–1–0)		
Melbourne	STK +76	**CAR** **+57**	**COL** **+10**	FIT −19	ESS −25	**SM** **−2**	**GEE** **+20**	**STK** **+24**	CAR; 0	COL −48	**FIT** **−17**	**ESS** **−55**	SM −5	GEE −32	6 (5–8–1)	GEE −62	STK +21	COL −14	B3 (1–2–0)		
South Melbourne	CAR −17	**ESS** **−11**	GEE −52	**COL** **+11**	STK +41	MEL +2	**FIT** **+29**	**CAR** **+32**	ESS −24	**GEE** **−20**	COL −60	**STK** **+63**	**MEL** **+5**	FIT −55	5 (7–7–0)	**FIT** **−14**	**ESS** **−17**	**CAR** **+25**	A3 (1–2–0)		
St Kilda	**MEL** **−76**	GEE −68	**FIT** **−37**	ESS −75	**SM** **−41**	**COL** **−34**	CAR −10	MEL −24	**GEE** **−68**	FIT −48	**ESS** **−56**	SM −63	COL −59	**CAR** **−14**	8 (0–14–0)	**COL** **−76**	**MEL** **−21**	GEE −75	B4 (0–3–0)		

Source: AFL Tables

== Season notes ==
- On 21 May 1898, playing against St Kilda Football Club, Geelong's Firth McCallum eluded 12 opponents to score a goal.
- In round 3, Carlton and Essendon kicked a combined 0.4 (4) in the second half. This stands as the lowest-scoring half in VFL/AFL history.
- On 12 August 1898, the League issues a directive that all field umpires are banned from playing, after umpire Samuel Hood plays for Footscray against North Melbourne in a VFA match on the 6th of August.
- A VFL representative team played two matches against a combined Ballarat Football League team. The VFL won their home match, and lost their away match.
- Essendon player Corrie Gardner, who also played for Melbourne Football Club from 1900 to 1903 and in 1905, and who represented Australia in the hurdles and the long jump at the 1904 Summer Olympics at St. Louis, Missouri in the USA, won the Australian Amateur Athletics hurdle championship in 1898.
- At the end of the home-and away season, Essendon had a VFL record percentage of 202.2%.
- 1898 was the first VFL season that the premiership had been decided in a "challenge" match.
- A set of brothers played for Fitzroy in the 1898 "Grand Final Match": Jim Grace and Mick Grace.

== Awards ==
- The 1898 VFL Premiership team was Fitzroy.
- The VFL's leading goalkicker was Archie Smith of Collingwood with 31 goals.
- The wooden spoon went to St Kilda.
