= List of VFL debuts in 1900 =

The 1900 Victorian Football League (VFL) season was the fourth season of the VFL. The season saw 86 Australian rules footballers make their senior VFL debut and a further 16 players transfer to new clubs having previously played in the VFL.

== Summary ==
Summary of debuts in 1908
Club	VFL debuts	Change of club
Carlton	13	1
Collingwood	13	0
Essendon	7	2
Fitzroy	5	1
Geelong	12	1
Melbourne	9	4
St Kilda	15	4
South Melbourne	12	3
Total	86	16

== Debuts ==
Name	Club	Age at debut	Round debuted	Games	Goals	Notes
Fred Elliott	Carlton	21 years, 28 days	1	197	86	Previously played for Melbourne.
Charlie Roland	Carlton	24 years, 96 days	1	100	24	
Joe Sullivan	Carlton	23 years, 93 days	1	54	63	
Charlie Ross	Carlton	21 years, 294 days	6	41	8	
Harry Rigby	Carlton	22 years, 116 days	1	29	2	
Wally Powell	Carlton	22 years, 35 days	1	28	0	
Joe Marr	Carlton	19 years, 290 days	5	27	6	
Gerald O'Dwyer	Carlton	27 years, 223 days	1	16	0	
Bill Lewis	Carlton	25 years, 232 days	1	15	9	
Ned Bennett	Carlton	23 years, 360 days	11	6	0	
Peter Campbell	Carlton	25 years, 27 days	5	3	1	
Jim Matthews	Carlton	20 years, 68 days	14	3	0	
Bill Strickland	Carlton	17 years, 346 days	5	1	0	
Charlie Oliver	Carlton	25 years, 301 days	10	1	1	
Artie Robson	Collingwood	22 years, 86 days	1	14	15	
Owen Brennan	Collingwood	22 years, 260 days	1	11	2	
Ted Absolom	Collingwood	24 years, 297 days	8	11	3	
Roland Duncan	Collingwood	21 years, 88 days	1	8	5	
Joe Rouse	Collingwood	17 years, 83 days	13	6	4	
Tom McLean	Collingwood	23 years, 351 days	8	5	3	
Ted Burke	Collingwood	22 years, 312 days	5	3	0	
Pat Cleary	Collingwood	19 years, 99 days	5	3	0	
John Parish	Collingwood	24 years, 250 days	5	3	0	
Stan Watsford	Collingwood	26 years, 97 days	1	2	0	Brother of Doug Watsford.
Eddie Harris	Collingwood	20 years, 316 days	2	1	0	
Bob Carmichael	Collingwood	18 years, 167 days	12	1	0	
Charles Langtree	Collingwood	17 years, 96 days	12	1	0	Grandson of Alex McCracken.
Fred Hiskins	Essendon	22 years, 17 days	15	50	78	Brother of Arthur, Rupe and Stan Hiskins and father of Jack Hiskins.
Mick Peppard	Essendon	23 years, 7 days	1	42	10	Previously played for Fitzroy.
Alf Dear	Essendon	21 years, 238 days	5	6	1	Previously played for Geelong.
Llew Jones	Essendon	19 years, 339 days	1	5	2	Brother of Jim and Mick Grace.
Billy Grace	Essendon	23 years, 319 days	4	4	1	
Herb Hunter	Essendon	18 years, 186 days	4	3	0	
Tommy Leahy	Essendon	29 years, 273 days	1	2	0	
Bill Crebbin	Essendon	31 years, 128 days	11	1	0	
Hughie Johns	Essendon	21 years, 348 days	11	1	2	
Lou Barker	Fitzroy	23 years, 334 days	1	150	63	
Gerald Brosnan	Fitzroy	22 years, 264 days	1	131	160	
Gordon Ross	Fitzroy	22 years, 16 days	14	4	1	
Arthur Middleton	Fitzroy	24 years, 2 days	7	3	1	Previously played for St Kilda.
Joe Grace	Fitzroy	21 years, 271 days	10	2	0	Brother of Jim and Mick Grace.
Dave McGrath	Fitzroy	27 years, 274 days	14	1	1	
Ernest Newling	Geelong	23 years, 362 days	8	150	22	
Mick Donaghy	Geelong	22 years, 172 days	1	80	3	Previously played for Carlton.
James Horman	Geelong	22 years, 177 days	1	31	2	Brother of George Horman.
Ted Holland	Geelong	20 years, 232 days	10	31	4	
Hughie Webb	Geelong	21 years, 228 days	9	22	4	
Jack Hardiman	Geelong	22 years, 282 days	1	21	11	
Joe Powell	Geelong	31 years, 309 days	1	17	0	
Len Strickland	Geelong	19 years, 357 days	1	5	0	
Bill de Gruchy	Geelong	22 years, 309 days	1	1	0	Brother of Harold de Gruchy.
Robert Stanlake	Geelong	17 years, 49 days	1	1	0	
Harold Collocott	Geelong	16 years, 363 days	8	1	0	
James Gatehouse	Geelong	17 years, 88 days	8	1	0	
Heber Quinton	Geelong	16 years, 233 days	8	1	0	
Jack Purse	Melbourne	20 years, 311 days	1	109	12	Previously played for St Kilda. Brother of Hugh Purse.
Frank Langley	Melbourne	17 years, 204 days	1	89	61	Son of Henry Archdall Langley, Anglican Bishop of Bendigo, and brother of Henry Thomas Langley.
Harry Parkin	Melbourne	20 years, 325 days	1	85	2	Previously played for Geelong. Brother of Jack Parkin.
Bill Bowe	Melbourne	21 years, 96 days	1	74	3	
Corrie Gardner	Melbourne	21 years, 54 days	1	48	0	Represented Australia at the 1904 Summer Olympics. Brother of Eric Gardner. Previously played for Essendon.
Eric Gardner	Melbourne	19 years, 10 days	10	39	13	Brother of Corrie Gardner.
Ernie Adams	Melbourne	22 years, 105 days	1	11	6	
Harold Hay	Melbourne	18 years, 216 days	13	7	2	Brother of Ced Hay.
Bryan McGuigan	Melbourne	19 years, 241 days	1	2	0	
Harry Graham	Melbourne	29 years, 220 days	9	2	3	Also played Test cricket for Australia.
Ced Hay	Melbourne	19 years, 325 days	3	1	0	Brother of Harold Hay.
Harold Riggall	Melbourne	18 years, 206 days	3	1	1	
Val Robertson	St Kilda	21 years, 122 days	14	59	0	Previously played for South Melbourne.
Cecil Sandford	St Kilda	25 years, 276 days	1	43	12	Previously played for Geelong.
Arch Muirhead	St Kilda	23 years, 284 days	1	33	1	Previously played for Fitzroy.
Arthur Pearce	St Kilda	19 years, 124 days	1	27	6	
Claude Clough	St Kilda	15 years, 209 days	1	23	8	The youngest-ever VFL/AFL player.
George Sutherland	St Kilda	24 years, 70 days	1	17	15	
Charlie Clarke	St Kilda	20 years, 203 days	9	17	5	
Gordon Allard	St Kilda	22 years, 352 days	1	16	7	
Arthur Scott	St Kilda	22 years, 14 days	7	14	4	
Bill O'Hara	St Kilda	21 years, 116 days	1	13	3	
Tim Curran	St Kilda	25 years, 82 days	1	10	1	Previously played for Fitzroy.
Bill Richardson	St Kilda	20 years, 189 days	3	3	0	
Fred Warry	St Kilda	19 years, 159 days	02	2	0	
Bill Harris	St Kilda	23 years, 12 days	5	2	0	
Roy Wawn	St Kilda	18 years, 172 days	16	2	1	
Dave Strickland	St Kilda	22 years, 159 days	2	1	0	Father of Shirley Strickland.
Bob Campbell	St Kilda	31 years, 304 days	10	1	0	
Henry Jackson	St Kilda	22 years, 262 days	17	1	0	
Harold Stewart	St Kilda	24 years, 135 days	17	1	0	
Tom Wenborn	South Melbourne	19 years, 347 days	6	56	0	
Jim Williamson	South Melbourne	24 years, 51 days	5	30	0	
Les Vernon	South Melbourne	18 years, 90 days	1	22	1	Previously played for Carlton.
Mike O'Hehir	South Melbourne	24 years, 87 days	13	18	2	
Sam Brockwell	South Melbourne	29 years, 97 days	2	15	4	Previously played for Geelong.
Alby Rose	South Melbourne	24 years, 216 days	1	12	9	
Alf Dowsing	South Melbourne	17 years, 295 days	16	9	2	
Jack Davidson	South Melbourne	24 years, 360 days	1	7	0	Previously played for Melbourne.
Bert Williams	South Melbourne	27 years, 131 days	8	7	1	
Charlie Robertson	South Melbourne	27 years, 132 days	1	6	0	
Bill Moodie	South Melbourne	20 years, 284 days	13	5	0	
Martin Gullan	South Melbourne	23 years, 212 days	1	2	1	
Alf Chapman	South Melbourne	25 years, 147 days	9	2	0	
Fred Monkhouse	South Melbourne	29 years, 48 days	12	2	1	
Tim McKeegan	South Melbourne	22 years, 319 days	14	2	0	
