= 1898 Geelong Football Club season =

Geelong Football Club
1898 season
- President: J. H. Grey
- Captains: Jack Conway (2nd season)
- Home ground: Corio Oval
- VFL Season: 4th
- 1898 Finals Series: 2nd Section B
- Leading goalkicker: Eddy James (26 goals)

The 1898 VFL Season was the Geelong Football Club's second season in the Victorian Football League and its second with Jack Conway as captain.

Geelong finished the home and away with 9 wins and 5 losses, finishing in fourth position. In the final series, Geelong finished with 2 wins and 1 loss, finishing in second position on the Section B Ladder. Geelong failed to qualify for the semi-final.

The leading goalkicker was Eddy James with 26 goals.

== Playing List ==
Twelve Geelong players made their VFL debuts and a total of 34 players were used during the season. Six players played 17 games for Geelong this season, and, Eddy James again was the club's leading goalkicker with 26 this season.

=== Statistics ===
Denotes statistical category leader for season

Geelong's 1898 playing list and statistics
Player	Games	Goals	Milestones
Ernest Anderson	1	0	VFL Debut (Round 11)
Les Bailiff	9	0	VFL Debut (Round 9)
Bert Barling	8	1	
Sam Brockwell	15	0	
Peter Burns	17	3	
Ossie Calvert	2	0	VFL Debut (Round 13)
Charlie Coles	3	1	
Jack Conway	17	0	
Walter Cooke	9	1	VFL Debut (Round 2)
Alf Dear	13	2	VFL Debut (Round 2)
Jack Dore	5	0	VFL Debut (Round 3)
Jim Flynn	17	2	
Ted Greeves	4	0	
Teddy Holligan	17	7	
Eddy James	13	26	
Alec King	6	3	VFL Debut (Round 11)
Paddy Leahy	3	0	
Ernie Leighton	13	13	VFL Debut (Round 5)
Tom Maguire	1	0	
Firth McCallum	16	9	
Arthur McKenzie	4	0	VFL Debut (Round 14)
Henry McShane	15	1	
Jim McShane	16	5	
Joe McShane	17	4	
Jack O'Loughlin	12	0	VFL Debut (Round 1)
Jack Parkin	16	4	
Arthur Pincott	17	0	
Jack Quinn	5	2	
Bill Robertson	1	0	VFL Debut (Round 2)
Cecil Sandford	1	1	
Archie Thompson	16	3	
Dick Walker	14	10	VFL Debut (Round 2)
Fred White	16	13	
Henry Young	1	1	

== Season summary ==
In a quite competitive season, Geelong's 9-5 record meant that Geelong finished in fourth position on the ladder and, therefore, qualified for the Section B finals group. In Section B, Geelong had a 2-1 record which meant the finished in second position and did not qualify for the semi-finals.

=== Results ===
Key
H	Home game
A	Away game
SR	Sectional Round

Table of season results
Round	Date	Result	Score			Opponent	Score			Ground		Attendance	Ladder	Report
Round	Date	Result	G	B	T	Opponent	G	B	T	Ground		Attendance	Ladder	Report
1	14 May	Lost	3	9	27	Collingwood	7	6	48	Victoria Park	A	-	6th	Report
2	21 May	Won	11	19	85	St Kilda	2	5	17	Corio Oval	H	-	3rd	Report
3	24 May	Won	7	18	60	South Melbourne	1	2	8	Corio Oval	H	-	3rd	Report
4	28 May	Won	3	12	30	Carlton	4	5	29	Princes Park	A	-	3rd	Report
5	4 June	Lost	4	10	34	Fitzroy	6	3	39	Corio Oval	H	-	3rd	Report
6	11 June	Won	4	7	31	Essendon	3	6	24	Corio Oval	H	-	3rd	Report
7	18 June	Lost	5	9	39	Melbourne	9	5	59	Melbourne Cricket Ground	A	-	4th	Report
8	25 June	Won	6	5	41	Collingwood	2	10	22	Corio Oval	H	-	3rd	Report
9	9 July	Won	13	15	93	St Kilda	3	7	25	Junction Oval	A	-	2nd	Report
10	16 July	Won	3	11	29	South Melbourne	1	3	9	Lake Oval	A	-	2nd	Report
11	23 July	Won	8	10	58	Carlton	5	2	32	Corio Oval	H	-	2nd	Report
12	30 July	Lost	4	6	30	Fitzroy	5	9	39	Brunswick Street Oval	A	-	3rd	Report
13	13 August	Lost	5	7	37	Essendon	7	13	55	East Melbourne Cricket Ground	A	-	4th	Report
14	20 August	Won	7	9	51	Melbourne	2	7	19	Corio Oval	H	-	4th	Report
SR1	27 August	Won	11	12	78	Melbourne	2	4	16	Corio Oval	H	-	1st	Report
SR2	3 September	Lost	4	6	30	Collingwood	6	9	45	Victoria Park	A	-	2nd	Report
SR3	10 September	Won	14	18	102	St Kilda	4	3	27	Corio Oval	H	-	2nd	Report

=== Ladder ===
(P)	Premiers
	Section A
	Section B

#	Team	P	W	L	D	PF	PA	%	Pts
1	Essendon	14	11	3	0	756	374	202.1	44
2	Collingwood	14	10	4	0	657	363	181.0	40
3	Fitzroy (P)	14	10	4	0	568	467	121.6	40
4	Geelong	14	9	5	0	645	425	151.8	36
5	South Melbourne	14	7	7	0	482	538	89.6	28
6	Melbourne	14	5	8	1	529	545	97.1	22
7	Carlton	14	3	10	1	382	634	60.3	14
8	St Kilda	14	0	14	0	339	1012	33.5	0

Rules for classification: 1. premiership points; 2. percentage; 3. points for
Average score: 38.9
Source: AFL Tables

=== Section B Ladder ===
Qualified for finals

#	Team	P	W	L	D	PF	PA	%	Pts
1	Collingwood	3	3	0	0	203	98	207.1	12
2	Geelong	3	2	1	0	210	88	238.6	8
3	Melbourne	3	1	2	0	95	150	63.3	4
4	St Kilda	3	0	3	0	71	243	29.2	0

Rules for classification: 1. premiership points; 2. percentage; 3. points for
Source: AFL Tables
