= 1900 Geelong Football Club season =

Geelong Football Club
1900 season
- President: J. McMullen
- Captains: Peter Burns (2nd season)
- Home ground: Corio Oval
- VFL Season: 2nd
- Finals Series: 3rd Section B
- Leading goalkicker: Teddy Lockwood (24 goals)

The 1900 VFL season was the Geelong Football Club's fourth season in the Victorian Football League and its second with Peter Burns as captain.

Geelong finished the home and away with 9 wins and 5 losses, finishing in second position. In the final series, Geelong finished with 2 wins and 1 loss, finishing in second position on the Section B Ladder. Geelong failed to qualify for the Grand Final.

The leading goalkicker was Teddy Lockwood with 24 goals.

== Playing List ==
Only three players played in all 17 matches this season, with a total of 31 players being used. Teddy Lockwood was the leading goalkicker with 24 this season. A total of 12 players made their debuts in the VFL, and Mick Donaghy, made his debut for Geelong, having departed from Carlton. Five players reached the 50 game milestone.

=== Statistics ===
Denotes statistical category leader for season

Geelong's 1900 playing list and statistics
Player	Games	Goals	Milestones
Les Bailiff	14	0	
Tommy Buchan	5	5	
Peter Burns	17	0	50th Game (Round 2)
Charlie Coles	7	8	
Harold Collocott	1	0	VFL Debut (Round 8)
Bill de Gruchy	1	0	VFL Debut (Round 1)
Mick Donaghy	16	3	Geelong Debut (Round 1)
Jim Flynn	11	4	50th Game (Round 11)
James Gatehouse	1	0	VFL Debut (Round 8)
Jack Hardiman	16	9	VFL Debut (Round 1)
Ted Holland	9	0	VFL Debut (Round 10)
Teddy Holligan	13	5	50th Game (Round 6)
James Horman	15	1	VFL Debut (Round 1)
Eddy James	2	1	
Paddy Leahy	5	0	
George Lockwood	17	7	
Teddy Lockwood	16	24	
Firth McCallum	14	6	50th Game (Round 7)
Jim McShane	17	15	50th Game (Round 1)
Joe McShane	9	4	
Ernest Newling	8	3	VFL Debut (Round 8)
Jimmy Palmer	16	1	
Arthur Pincott	16	0	
Joe Powell	16	0	VFL Debut (Round 1)
Heber Quinton	1	0	VFL Debut (Round 8)
Teddy Rankin	16	5	
Robert Stanlake	1	0	VFL Debut (Round 1)
Len Strickland	5	0	VFL Debut (Round 1)
Archie Thompson	3	1	
Hughie Webb	9	0	VFL Debut (Round 9)
Henry Young	9	4	

== Season summary ==
Geelong were again competitive this season finishing with a 9-5 record in the home-and-away season. In the sectional rounds, Geelong's loss to Melbourne, and lack of a large victory against Collingwood and St Kilda, led to Geelong finishing in third position and being eliminated from the major premiership.

=== Results ===
Key
H	Home game
A	Away game
SR	Sectional Round

Table of season results
Round	Date	Result	Score			Opponent	Score			Ground		Attendance	Ladder	Report
Round	Date	Result	G	B	T	Opponent	G	B	T	Ground		Attendance	Ladder	Report
1	5 May	Won	4	11	35	Carlton	2	6	18	Princes Park	A	-	2nd	Report
2	12 May	Won	7	15	57	Collingwood	5	5	35	Corio Oval	H	-	1st	Report
4	24 May	Won	11	15	81	Melbourne	2	3	15	Corio Oval	H	-	1st	Report
5	26 May	Lost	3	5	23	South Melbourne	5	7	37	Lake Oval	A	-	2nd	Report
6	2 June	Lost	1	6	12	Fitzroy	6	10	46	Brunswick Street Oval	A	-	3rd	Report
7	9 June	Won	8	5	53	Essendon	4	7	31	Corio Oval	H	-	3rd	Report
8	23 June	Won	5	9	39	Carlton	3	13	31	Corio Oval	H	-	2nd	Report
9	30 June	Lost	3	5	23	Collingwood	6	6	42	Victoria Park	A	-	3rd	Report
10	7 July	Won	13	8	86	St Kilda	4	4	28	Corio Oval	H	-	3rd	Report
11	14 July	Lost	4	5	29	Melbourne	4	16	40	Melbourne Cricket Ground	A	-	3rd	Report
12	28 July	Won	10	10	70	South Melbourne	3	6	24	Corio Oval	H	-	2nd	Report
13	4 August	Won	8	9	57	Fitzroy	1	6	12	Corio Oval	H	-	2nd	Report
14	11 August	Lost	6	11	47	Essendon	10	7	67	East Melbourne Cricket Ground	A	-	2nd	Report
3 (Note: Match postponed (inclement weather))	18 August	Won	7	16	58	St Kilda	2	6	18	Junction Oval	A	-	2nd	Report
SR1	25 August	Lost	3	10	28	Melbourne	5	15	45	East Melbourne Cricket Ground	A	-	3rd	Report
SR2	1 September	Won	6	8	44	Collingwood	4	7	31	Corio Oval	H	-	3rd	Report
SR3	8 September	Won	7	15	57	St Kilda	5	9	39	Junction Oval	A	-	3rd	Report

=== Ladder ===
(P)	Premiers
	Section A
	Section B

#	Team	P	W	L	D	PF	PA	%	Pts
1	Fitzroy	14	11	3	0	729	434	168.0	44
2	Geelong	14	9	5	0	670	444	150.9	36
3	Essendon	14	8	6	0	666	485	137.3	32
4	Collingwood	14	8	6	0	627	540	116.1	32
5	South Melbourne	14	8	6	0	481	532	90.4	32
6	Melbourne (P)	14	6	8	0	654	643	101.7	24
7	Carlton	14	5	9	0	394	558	70.6	20
8	St Kilda	14	1	13	0	376	961	39.1	4

Rules for classification: 1. premiership points; 2. percentage; 3. points for
Average score: 41.0
Source: AFL Tables

Qualified for finals

#	Team	P	W	L	D	PF	PA	%	Pts
1	Essendon	3	3	0	0	193	65	296.9	12
2	Fitzroy	3	2	1	0	154	97	158.8	8
3	Carlton	3	1	2	0	79	192	41.1	4
4	South Melbourne	3	0	3	0	69	141	48.9	0

Rules for classification: 1. premiership points; 2. percentage; 3. points for
Source: AFL Tables

Qualified for finals

#	Team	P	W	L	D	PF	PA	%	Pts
1	Melbourne	3	2	1	0	155	73	212.3	8
2	Collingwood	3	2	1	0	129	77	167.5	8
3	Geelong	3	2	1	0	129	115	112.2	8
4	St Kilda	3	0	3	0	63	211	29.9	0

Rules for classification: 1. premiership points; 2. percentage; 3. points for
Source: AFL Tables

=== Section B Ladder ===
(P)	Premiers
	Section A
	Section B

#	Team	P	W	L	D	PF	PA	%	Pts
1	Fitzroy	14	11	3	0	729	434	168.0	44
2	Geelong	14	9	5	0	670	444	150.9	36
3	Essendon	14	8	6	0	666	485	137.3	32
4	Collingwood	14	8	6	0	627	540	116.1	32
5	South Melbourne	14	8	6	0	481	532	90.4	32
6	Melbourne (P)	14	6	8	0	654	643	101.7	24
7	Carlton	14	5	9	0	394	558	70.6	20
8	St Kilda	14	1	13	0	376	961	39.1	4

Rules for classification: 1. premiership points; 2. percentage; 3. points for
Average score: 41.0
Source: AFL Tables

Qualified for finals

#	Team	P	W	L	D	PF	PA	%	Pts
1	Essendon	3	3	0	0	193	65	296.9	12
2	Fitzroy	3	2	1	0	154	97	158.8	8
3	Carlton	3	1	2	0	79	192	41.1	4
4	South Melbourne	3	0	3	0	69	141	48.9	0

Rules for classification: 1. premiership points; 2. percentage; 3. points for
Source: AFL Tables

Qualified for finals

#	Team	P	W	L	D	PF	PA	%	Pts
1	Melbourne	3	2	1	0	155	73	212.3	8
2	Collingwood	3	2	1	0	129	77	167.5	8
3	Geelong	3	2	1	0	129	115	112.2	8
4	St Kilda	3	0	3	0	63	211	29.9	0

Rules for classification: 1. premiership points; 2. percentage; 3. points for
Source: AFL Tables
