= 1897 Geelong Football Club season =

Geelong Football Club
1897 season
- President: J. H. Grey
- Captains: Jack Conway (1st season)
- Home ground: Corio Oval
- VFL Season: 11 wins, 3 losses (1st)
- Finals series: 2 wins, 1 loss (runners-up)
- Best and Fairest: Joe McShane
- Leading goalkicker: Eddy James (27)

The 1897 VFL season was the Geelong Football Club's first season in the Victorian Football League in Australia and its first with Jack Conway as captain. Geelong finished the home and away season with 11 wins and 3 losses, finishing in first position and winning the minor premiership. In the final series, Geelong finished with 2 wins and 1 loss, finishing in second position.

The club best and fairest award was won by Joe McShane and the leading goalkicker was Eddy James with 27 goals. Eddy James also won the season's leading goalkicker medal, equaling the tally of Jack Leith of Melbourne.

== Playing list ==
This was the first ever Geelong Football Club squad in the Victorian Football League, as such, these players all made their debuts in the league. Six players played a total of seventeen games, and Eddy James kicked the most goals with 27. A total of 34 players played for Geelong at least once this season.

=== Statistics ===
Denotes statistical category leader for season

Geelong's 1897 playing list and statistics
Player	Games	Goals	Milestones
Mac Armstrong	4	0	VFL debut (round 6)
Bert Barling	9	3	VFL debut (round 5)
Sam Brockwell	14	0	VFL debut (round 3)
Peter Burns	17	2	VFL debut (round 1)
Charlie Coles	13	17	VFL debut (round 3)
Jack Conway	17	0	VFL debut (round 1)
Stan Enfield	3	3	VFL debut (round 2)
Jim Flynn	15	7	VFL debut (round 3)
Ted Greeves	2	0	VFL debut (round robin final 2)
Teddy Holligan	16	3	VFL debut (round 1)
Eddy James	15	27	VFL debut (round 1)
Paddy Leahy	2	0	VFL debut (round 1)
John Lucas	1	0	VFL debut (round 1)
Tom Maguire	12	0	VFL debut (round 1)
Firth McCallum	15	0	VFL debut (round 1)
Bill McKay	2	0	VFL debut (round 1)
Henry McShane	16	0	VFL debut (round 1)
Jim McShane	16	2	VFL debut (round 1)
Joe McShane	17	11	VFL debut (round 1)
Ned Moran	2	0	VFL debut (round 13)
Tom Mullins	1	0	VFL debut (round 1)
Jimmy Palmer	1	0	VFL debut (round 8)
Jack Parkin	17	1	VFL debut (round 1)
Bob Paterson	2	0	VFL debut (round 1)
Arthur Pincott	1	0	VFL debut (round 6)
Billy Pincott	16	0	VFL debut (round 1)
Alf Pontin	13	1	VFL debut (round 1)
Jack Quinn	16	14	VFL debut (round 1)
Ted Rankin	17	1	VFL debut (round 1)
Cecil Sandford	6	0	VFL debut (round 7)
Jack Sharkey	1	0	VFL debut (round 2)
Archie Thompson	17	1	VFL debut (round 1)
Fred White	11	14	VFL debut (round 6)
Henry Young	13	4	VFL debut (round 3)

== Season summary ==
=== May ===
Geelong began their campaign against Essendon at the Corio Oval. The Geelong team, composed largely of new players, were unable to score in the first half. Behind by three goals, Geelong were unable to make a comeback despite an improvement. Geelong lost by 23 points. In Round 2, Geelong travelled to the Melbourne Cricket Ground to play Melbourne. Geelong had no chance all day as Melbourne defeated Geelong by 45 points. Geelong were much better in the last quarter, though it did not change the outcome of the game. In Round 3, Geelong again travelled to Melbourne, this time to Victoria Park to play Collingwood. It was a shock to many to see Geelong be competitive as the unbeaten Collingwood were given "such a scare as they have not had for a long time past." A gallant Geelong were losers by four points. After three rounds, zero wins, three loses. In Round 4, Geelong recorded its first win against Carlton at the Corio Oval. It was a very fast match, with great kicking and marking skills. A great second quarter was enough for Geelong to win by 22 points.

=== June ===
When an in-form South Melbourne visited Geelong in Round 5, the wisest did not expect such a demolition. Geelong put the first 23 points on the board and led at half time by 34 points. South Melbourne were in a hopeless position, and though they improved, Geelong were winners by 48 points. Fitzroy were next to visit Geelong, though with some difficulty as the train to Geelong was delayed for 45 minutes. And so by the fourth quarter, the match was being played in complete darkness. Alas, though with poor goal kicking, Geelong were again victors by seventeen points. Geelong travelled to Melbourne to play St Kilda at the Junction Oval. It could be said that Geelong were heavily favored coming into the match against the winless Saints. It was a complete domination by the better twenty, Geelong by 83 points. Geelong scored the highest score in the season with 114 and which remained the league record until 13 May 1899 when Essendon scored a total of 116 against Melbourne. Thus concluded the first round-robin, Geelong had four wins and three losses and were sitting in fourth position. When Geelong met Essendon at the East Melbourne Cricket Ground in Round 8, there was much anticipation about the quality of the match, with two top teams to do battle. It was a terrific hard-fought match for the first three quarters, with Geelong leading by two points at the final change. In the last quarter, all the play was at the Essendon goal, Geelong winners by 25 points.

=== July ===
After a crushing defeat to Melbourne earlier in the season, Geelong made amends in a low-scoring affair at the Corio Oval. Only one goal was kicked in the entire match by Geelong's Eddy James. Geelong winners by five points. In Round 10, Geelong hosted Collingwood at the Corio Oval. Geelong's performance was declared by many old footballers as the "finest exhibition... from Geelong they had seen in years past." Despite Tom Maguire's injury, and thus playing with 19 men, Geelong held Collingwood to one goal all day to win by 42 points. When Geelong travelled to Princes Park to play Carlton, few gave Carlton any chance of winning. Though it was a crowded and disorganised game, Geelong won by 50 points. In Round 11, Geelong travelled to Melbourne to play South Melbourne at the Lake Oval. In front of a large crowd, the game was close for the first three quarters. However, it was Geelong who lasted longer and were winners by twelve points. For the third week in a row, Geelong travelled to Melbourne, this time to the Brunswick Street Oval to play Fitzroy. Fitzroy had only won 4 games from 12, and when Fitzroy were only one point behind at three-quarter time, the in-form visitors experienced an "uncomfortable shake-up". Geelong scored twelve points to one in the final quarter to win a close match by twelve points. With two matches left and being ten premiership points ahead of fifth place South Melbourne, Geelong qualified for the round-robin finals.

=== August ===
In the last match of the home-and-away season, Geelong hosted St Kilda at the Corio Oval. The winless St Kilda had one last chance to "break their duck", and they had no chance of qualifying for the finals. As Geelong had qualified for the finals in the week prior, the match was a dead rubber. St Kilda never had a chance, scoring only a goal "bare" in each of the first three quarters. Geelong winners by 78 points. Thus, concluded the home-and-away season, with Geelong finishing on top of the ladder by percentage with 11 wins and 3 losses. There was a great deal of controversy surrounding which ground the finals should be played on. Originally, it was decided that the ground would be determined by lots. However, league representatives from the metropolitan clubs had a meeting and decided none of the finals matches shall be played in Geelong. Geelong was therefore scheduled to play Essendon at the Melbourne Cricket Ground on the 14 August. The first round of the round-robin finals were postponed after torrential rain. It was then decided to redraw the first round of finals matches with the match containing Geelong to be played at the Corio Oval. The result of the draw was as follows: Melbourne vs. Collingwood at the Melbourne Cricket Ground; Geelong vs. Essendon at the Corio Oval.

Geelong's finals campaign began as its home-and-away season began, meeting Essendon at the Corio Oval. A strong southerly wind meant that most of the scoring would be done at the north end of the ground. Geelong started strong, but was wasteful, as inaccurate kicking saw the first term end with Geelong leading 11–2. With the wind against Geelong in the second quarter, a great defensive display allowed the hosts to maintain a lead at half-time 12–10. As happened in the first quarter, Geelong was wasteful in front of goal in the third quarter, being twelve points ahead at the final change. With twelve minutes to play, Geelong was still twelve points ahead, but it was Essendon kicking four goals in the last quarter who were victors by six points, ending Geelong's eleven game run. With a loss in the first match, Geelong needed two wins to have any chance of winning the premiership. Geelong met the loser of the other first-round final, Melbourne on Fitzroy's ground, the Brunswick Street Oval. Melbourne had a westerly wind towards their goals in the first quarter, and made full advantage of it, leading 20–3 at the first break. Geelong chipped away at Melbourne's lead in the second term but was still behind by eight points at the main break. Geelong was again better in the third quarter though did not have much to show for it, being behind by three points at the final break. A few behinds later at the scores were level midway through the last quarter. Moments later, Eddy James scored the final goal of the match with Geelong holding on to win by nine points.

=== September ===
Per the finals system, for Geelong to be premiers, they are required to beat Collingwood, for Essendon to lose to Melbourne, and to beat Essendon in a play-off the following week. Geelong met Collingwood at the East Melbourne Cricket Ground in the final match of the round-robin series. Geelong started very well, with a strong northerly wind blowing, Geelong took full advantage of it scoring five goals, two behinds to nil. Though Collingwood had the wind in the second quarter, they failed to take advantage, and the half time score was 44–18. The two clubs, who prior, were on friendly terms, showed an unsportsmanlike display for most of the third quarter. The main culprits, one from each team, were Harry Dowdall of Collingwood, and Jim McShane of Geelong. Alas, the quarter was fairly even, eight points to seven. With Geelong ahead by 27 points at the final change, many thought there was no chance for Collingwood to come back. However, with the wind in the fourth quarter, Collingwood held Geelong scoreless but was unable to score enough points to claim victory. Geelong winners by four points. Though Geelong won the match, they did not win the premiership, because at the same time Essendon had beaten Melbourne to claim the premiership as they were undefeated in the finals series.

=== Results ===
Key
H	Home game
A	Away game
RRF	Round robin final

Table of season results
Round	Date	Result	Score			Opponent	Score			Ground		Attendance	Ladder	Report
Round	Date	Result	G	B	T	Opponent	G	B	T	Ground		Attendance	Ladder	Report
1	8 May	Lost	3	6	24	Essendon	7	5	47	Corio Oval	H	-	6th	Report
2	15 May	Lost	3	1	19	Melbourne	9	10	64	Melbourne Cricket Ground	A	-	8th	Report
3	22 May	Lost	5	7	37	Collingwood	6	5	41	Victoria Park	A	-	7th	Report
4	29 May	Won	5	14	44	Carlton	3	4	22	Corio Oval	H	-	6th	Report
5	5 June	Won	10	12	72	South Melbourne	3	6	24	Corio Oval	H	-	6th	Report
6	19 June	Won	3	13	31	Fitzroy	2	3	15	Corio Oval	H	-	4th	Report
7	22 June	Won	16	18	114	St Kilda	4	7	31	Junction Oval	A	-	4th	Report
8	26 June	Won	8	9	57	Essendon	5	2	32	East Melbourne Cricket Ground	A	-	4th	Report
9	3 July	Won	1	9	15	Melbourne	0	10	10	Corio Oval	H	-	2nd	Report
10	10 July	Won	7	10	52	Collingwood	1	4	10	Corio Oval	H	-	2nd	Report
11	17 July	Won	9	12	66	Carlton	2	4	16	Princes Park	A	-	2nd	Report
12	24 July	Won	6	8	44	South Melbourne	5	2	32	Lake Oval	A	-	2nd	Report
13	31 July	Won	5	3	33	Fitzroy	2	9	21	Brunswick Street Oval	A	-	2nd	Report
14	7 August	Won	14	12	96	St Kilda	3	0	18	Corio Oval	H	-	1st	Report
RRF1	21 August	Lost	3	11	29	Essendon	5	5	35	Corio Oval	H	5,000	4th	Report
RRF2	28 August	Won	5	16	46	Melbourne	5	7	37	Brunswick Street Oval	H	4,000	2nd	Report
RRF3	4 September	Won	8	4	52	Collingwood	6	12	48	East Melbourne Cricket Ground	H	3,000	2nd	Report

=== Ladder ===
(P)	Premiers
	Qualified for finals

#	Team	P	W	L	D	PF	PA	%	Pts
1	Geelong	14	11	3	0	704	383	183.8	44
2	Essendon (P)	14	11	3	0	706	445	158.7	44
3	Melbourne	14	10	4	0	685	473	144.8	40
4	Collingwood	14	9	5	0	509	445	114.4	36
5	South Melbourne	14	8	5	1	595	430	138.4	34
6	Fitzroy	14	4	9	1	509	485	104.9	18
7	Carlton	14	2	12	0	376	737	51.0	8
8	St Kilda	14	0	14	0	280	966	29.0	0

Rules for classification: 1. premiership points; 2. percentage; 3. points for
Average score: 39.0
Source: AFL Tables

=== Finals ladder ===
Won the premiership

#	Team	P	W	L	D	PF	PA	%	Pts
1	Essendon	3	3	0	0	119	67	177.6	12
2	Geelong	3	2	1	0	127	120	105.8	8
3	Collingwood	3	1	2	0	129	169	76.3	4
4	Melbourne	3	0	3	0	92	111	82.9	0

Rules for classification: 1. premiership points; 2. percentage; 3. points for
Source: AFL Tables

== Notable events ==
- The first round finals match between Geelong and Essendon at the Corio Oval was the only finals match to be played in Geelong until 2013.
