= 1899 Geelong Football Club season =

Geelong Football Club's third season in the VFL

Geelong Football Club
1899 season
- President: J. H. Grey
- Captains: Jack Conway (3rd season)
- Home ground: Corio Oval
- VFL Season: 2nd
- Finals Series: 2nd Section B
- Leading goalkicker: Eddy James (31 goals)

The 1899 VFL Season was the Geelong Football Club's third season in the Victorian Football League and its third with Jack Conway as captain.

Geelong finished the home and away with 10 wins and 4 losses, finishing in second position. In the final series, Geelong finished with 2 wins and 1 loss, finishing in second position on the Section B Ladder. Geelong failed to qualify for the Grand Final.

The leading goalkicker was Eddy James with 31 goals, who also won the league's leading goalkicker medal for the second time.

== Playing List ==
26 players were used this season with a total of six playing all 17 matches for Geelong this season. Six players made their debut in the VFL this season, and Eddy James, for a third year in a row, led the goalkicking tally with 31 goals.

=== Statistics ===
Denotes statistical category leader for season

Geelong's 1899 playing list and statistics
Player	Games	Goals	Milestones
Norman Belcher	2	0	VFL Debut (Round 4)
Tommy Buchan	17	8	VFL Debut (Round 1)
Peter Burns	14	2	
Jack Conway	17	0	50th Game (Sectional Round 2)
Alf Dear	9	1	
Jim Flynn	14	3	
Ted Greeves	14	2	
Teddy Holligan	12	8	
Eddy James	16	31	
Paddy Leahy	7	0	
Ernie Leighton	16	5	
George Lockwood	16	0	VFL Debut (Round 1)
Teddy Lockwood	16	20	VFL Debut (Round 1)
Firth McCallum	13	5	
Jim McShane	17	16	
Joe McShane	17	7	50th Game (Sectional Round 2)
Pat O'Donnell	1	0	VFL Debut (Round 2)
Jimmy Palmer	15	0	
Harry Parkin	2	0	VFL Debut (Round 11)
Jack Parkin	17	6	50th Game (Sectional Round 3)
Arthur Pincott	15	0	
Billy Pincott	1	0	
Teddy Rankin	16	1	
Archie Thompson	17	9	50th Game (Sectional Round 3)
Fred White	1	1	
Henry Young	4	4	

== Season summary ==
Geelong were competitive this season finishing the home and away season with a 10–4 record, finishing in second position, and qualifying for the Section B finals. Due to the loss against 6th placed South Melbourne, and despite the "slaughter of innocents" against St Kilda, Geelong were eliminated due to South Melbourne's victory over Essendon. Geelong again broke the record for highest score when they met St Kilda in Sectional Round 3. Geelong's score totaled 162 and was the record for twelve years. The record was beaten by Essendon in the 1911 VFL season, when they totaled one more than Geelong, scoring 163.

=== Results ===
Key
H	Home game
A	Away game
SR	Sectional Round

Table of season results
Round	Date	Result	Score			Opponent	Score			Ground		Attendance	Ladder	Report
Round	Date	Result	G	B	T	Opponent	G	B	T	Ground		Attendance	Ladder	Report
1	13 May	Won	8	6	54	Collingwood	3	9	27	Corio Oval	H	-	4th	Report
2	20 May	Won	5	6	36	Carlton	1	5	11	Princes Park	A	-	2nd	Report
3	24 May	Lost	0	8	8	Fitzroy	4	8	32	Corio Oval	H	-	3rd	Report
4	27 May	Lost	4	3	27	Melbourne	4	8	32	Melbourne Cricket Ground	A	-	4th	Report
5	3 June	Won	3	10	28	Essendon	3	6	24	Corio Oval	H	-	5th	Report
6	10 June	Lost	3	1	19	South Melbourne	5	5	35	Lake Oval	A	-	6th	Report
7	17 June	Won	12	6	78	St Kilda	3	13	31	Junction Oval	A	-	3rd	Report
8	24 June	Won	9	7	61	Collingwood	2	8	20	Victoria Park	A	-	3rd	Report
9	8 July	Won	9	9	63	Carlton	5	3	33	Corio Oval	H	-	3rd	Report
10	15 July	Won	8	10	58	Fitzroy	3	5	23	Brunswick Street Oval	A	-	3rd	Report
11	22 July	Won	5	6	36	Melbourne	2	10	22	Corio Oval	H	-	3rd	Report
12	29 July	Lost	6	7	43	Essendon	10	7	67	East Melbourne Cricket Ground	A	-	4th	Report
13	5 August	Won	7	12	54	South Melbourne	3	9	27	Corio Oval	H	-	3rd	Report
14	12 August	Won	16	23	119	St Kilda	0	2	2	Corio Oval	H	-	2nd	Report
SR1	26 August	Lost	5	8	38	South Melbourne	6	5	41	Corio Oval	H	-	3rd	Report
SR2	2 September	Won	6	11	47	Essendon	4	15	39	East Melbourne Cricket Ground	A	-	3rd	Report
SR3	9 September	Won	23	24	162	St Kilda	0	1	1	Corio Oval	H	-	2nd	Report

=== Ladder ===
(P)	Premiers
	Section A
	Section B

#	Team	P	W	L	D	PF	PA	%	Pts
1	Fitzroy (P)	14	11	3	0	618	403	153.3	44
2	Geelong	14	10	4	0	684	386	177.2	40
3	Collingwood	14	10	4	0	590	436	135.3	40
4	Essendon	14	9	5	0	600	428	140.2	36
5	Melbourne	14	8	6	0	574	420	136.7	32
6	South Melbourne	14	5	9	0	528	502	105.2	20
7	Carlton	14	3	11	0	317	597	53.1	12
8	St Kilda	14	0	14	0	288	1027	28.0	0

Rules for classification: 1. premiership points; 2. percentage; 3. points for
Average score: 37.5
Source: AFL Tables

Qualified for finals

#	Team	P	W	L	D	PF	PA	%	Pts
1	Fitzroy	3	3	0	0	126	73	172.6	12
2	Collingwood	3	2	1	0	114	87	131.0	8
3	Carlton	3	1	2	0	98	95	103.2	4
4	Melbourne	3	0	3	0	43	126	34.1	0

Rules for classification: 1. premiership points; 2. percentage; 3. points for
Source: AFL Tables

Qualified for finals

#	Team	P	W	L	D	PF	PA	%	Pts
1	South Melbourne	3	3	0	0	151	63	239.7	12
2	Geelong	3	2	1	0	247	81	304.9	8
3	Essendon	3	1	2	0	172	97	177.3	4
4	St Kilda	3	0	3	0	35	364	9.6	0

Rules for classification: 1. premiership points; 2. percentage; 3. points for
Source: AFL Tables

=== Section B Ladder ===
(P)	Premiers
	Section A
	Section B

#	Team	P	W	L	D	PF	PA	%	Pts
1	Fitzroy (P)	14	11	3	0	618	403	153.3	44
2	Geelong	14	10	4	0	684	386	177.2	40
3	Collingwood	14	10	4	0	590	436	135.3	40
4	Essendon	14	9	5	0	600	428	140.2	36
5	Melbourne	14	8	6	0	574	420	136.7	32
6	South Melbourne	14	5	9	0	528	502	105.2	20
7	Carlton	14	3	11	0	317	597	53.1	12
8	St Kilda	14	0	14	0	288	1027	28.0	0

Rules for classification: 1. premiership points; 2. percentage; 3. points for
Average score: 37.5
Source: AFL Tables

Qualified for finals

#	Team	P	W	L	D	PF	PA	%	Pts
1	Fitzroy	3	3	0	0	126	73	172.6	12
2	Collingwood	3	2	1	0	114	87	131.0	8
3	Carlton	3	1	2	0	98	95	103.2	4
4	Melbourne	3	0	3	0	43	126	34.1	0

Rules for classification: 1. premiership points; 2. percentage; 3. points for
Source: AFL Tables

Qualified for finals

#	Team	P	W	L	D	PF	PA	%	Pts
1	South Melbourne	3	3	0	0	151	63	239.7	12
2	Geelong	3	2	1	0	247	81	304.9	8
3	Essendon	3	1	2	0	172	97	177.3	4
4	St Kilda	3	0	3	0	35	364	9.6	0

Rules for classification: 1. premiership points; 2. percentage; 3. points for
Source: AFL Tables
