= Pincott =

Pincott is a surname. Notable people with the surname include:

- Arthur Pincott (1877–1935), Australian rules footballer
- Billy Pincott (1875–1955), Australian rules footballer
- Sharon Pincott (born 1962), Australian author and specialist in the field of African elephant behavior
- Amy Pincott (born 1928), Australian badminton player
