= Patrick O'Donnell =

Patrick O'Donnell may refer to:

- Pat O'Donnell (Australian footballer) (1876–1915)
- Pat O'Donnell (born 1991), American football punter
- Patrick O'Donnell (Invincible) (1835–1883), member of the Irish National Invincibles
- Patrick O'Donnell (cardinal) (1856–1927), Roman Catholic Cardinal Archbishop of Armagh, Primate of All Ireland
- Patrick Mary O'Donnell (1897–1980), Irish-born Roman Catholic priest in Australia
- Patrick O'Donnell (Canadian general) (1940–2015)
- Patrick O'Donnell (Gaelic footballer) (1965–2024), Northern Irish Gaelic football manager and player
- Patrick O'Donnell (California politician) (born 1966), member of the California State Assembly
- Patrick O'Donnell (Irish politician) (died 1970), Irish Fine Gael politician from Donegal
- Patrick J. O'Donnell (died 2016), professor of psychology at the University of Glasgow
- Patrick K. O'Donnell, American author, historian
- Patrick Denis O'Donnell, Irish military historian

== See also ==
- Patty O'Donnell (born 1954), American politician in Vermont
