= Gullan =

Gullan is a surname. Notable people with the surname include:

- Campbell Gullan (1881–1939), Scottish actor
- Jamie Gullan (born 1999), Scottish footballer
- Martin Gullan (1876–1939), Australian rules footballer
- Stan Gullan (1926–1999), Scottish footballer

== See also ==
- Gulla
