= Stan Watsford =

Australian rules footballer

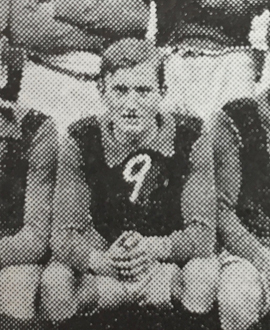
- Watsford in 1900

Personal information
- Full name: Edward Stanley Watsford
- Born: 28 January 1874; Albury, New South Wales
- Died: 21 August 1927 (aged 53); Mitcham, Victoria
- Original team: Hawthorn (VMFL)
- Height: 180 cm (5 ft 11 in)
- Weight: 79 kg (174 lb)

Playing career^{1}
Years	Club	Games (Goals)
1900	Collingwood	2 (0)
- ^{1} Playing statistics correct to the end of 1900.

Edward Stanley Watsford (28 January 1874 – 21 August 1927) was an Australian rules footballer who played with Collingwood in the Victorian Football League (VFL).

He was the brother of Doug Watsford who also played for Collingwood.
