= Ossie Calvert =

Australian rules footballer

Osborne Calvert

Personal information
- Full name: Osborne Calvert
- Born: 4 August 1880; Irrewarra, Victoria
- Died: 26 December 1949 (aged 69); Clyde, Victoria
- Original team: Geelong Grammar

Playing career^{1}
Years	Club	Games (Goals)
1898	Geelong	2 (0)
- ^{1} Playing statistics correct to the end of 1898.

Osborne Calvert (4 August 1880 – 26 December 1949) was an Australian rules footballer who played with Geelong in the Victorian Football League (VFL).
