= Mac Armstrong =

Australian rules footballer (1869–1913)

Personal information
- Full name: McKay John Armstrong
- Born: 17 September 1869; Bannockburn, Victoria
- Died: 4 July 1913 (aged 43); Bannockburn, Victoria
- Original team: Geelong College

Playing career^{1}
Years	Club	Games (Goals)
1897	Geelong	4 (0)
- ^{1} Playing statistics correct to the end of 1897.

McKay John Armstrong (17 September 1869 – 4 July 1913) was an Australian rules footballer who played for the Geelong Football Club in the Victorian Football League (VFL).
