= Bill Robertson (Australian footballer) =

Australian rules footballer (1879–1957)

Personal information
- Full name: William John Robertson
- Born: 31 March 1879; Fitzroy, Victoria
- Died: 19 December 1957 (aged 78); South Yarra, Victoria
- Original team: Geelong College

Playing career^{1}
Years	Club	Games (Goals)
1898	Geelong	1 (0)
- ^{1} Playing statistics correct to the end of 1898.

William John Robertson (31 March 1879 – 19 December 1957) was an Australian rules footballer who played with Geelong in the Victorian Football League (VFL).
