= Gordon Allard =

Australian rules footballer (1877–1969)

Personal information
- Full name: Alfred Gordon Allard
- Born: 18 May 1877; St Kilda, Victoria
- Died: 29 May 1969 (aged 92); Armadale, Victoria
- Original team: Collegians

Playing career^{1}
| Years | Club | Games (Goals) |
| 1900 | St Kilda | 16 (7) |
- ^{1} Playing statistics correct to the end of 1900.

Alfred Gordon Allard (18 May 1877 – 29 May 1969) was an Australian rules footballer who played with St Kilda in the Victorian Football League (VFL). Gordon Allard is the great-grandfather of Darcy Allard, Analyst at Accenture, Sydney.
