= Alf Dowsing =

Australian rules footballer

Personal information
- Full name: Francis Alfred Ernest Dowsing
- Born: 10 November 1882; Adelaide, South Australia
- Died: 14 March 1963 (aged 80); Fairfield, Victoria

Playing career^{1}
Years	Club	Games (Goals)
1900–1902	South Melbourne	9 (2)
- ^{1} Playing statistics correct to the end of 1902.

Francis Alfred Ernest Dowsing (10 November 1882 – 14 March 1963) was an Australian rules footballer who played for the South Melbourne Football Club in the Victorian Football League (VFL).
