= Bob Paterson =

Australian rules footballer

Personal information
- Full name: Robert Venters Paterson
- Born: 10 October 1875; Geelong
- Died: 9 July 1960 (aged 84); Geelong

Playing career^{1}
| Years | Club | Games (Goals) |
| 1897 | Geelong | 2 (0) |
- ^{1} Playing statistics correct to the end of 1897.

Robert Venters Paterson (10 October 1875 – 9 July 1960) was an Australian rules footballer who played with Geelong in the Victorian Football League (VFL).
