= Walter Cooke (footballer) =

Australian rules footballer

Personal information
- Full name: Walter Mark Cooke
- Born: 18 November 1876; Geelong, Victoria
- Died: 22 April 1927 (aged 50); East Melbourne, Victoria
- Original team: Breakwater

Playing career^{1}
Years	Club	Games (Goals)
1898	Geelong	9 (1)
- ^{1} Playing statistics correct to the end of 1898.

Walter Mark Cooke (18 November 1876 – 22 April 1927) was an Australian rules footballer who played with Geelong in the Victorian Football League (VFL).
