= Bill McKay (Australian footballer) =

Australian rules footballer

Personal information
- Full name: William Henry McKay
- Born: 10 July 1879; Geelong, Victoria
- Died: 9 March 1950 (aged 70); Footscray, Victoria

Playing career^{1}
| Years | Club | Games (Goals) |
| 1897 | Geelong | 2 (0) |
- ^{1} Playing statistics correct to the end of 1897.

William Henry McKay (10 July 1879 – 9 March 1950) was an Australian rules footballer who played with Geelong in the Victorian Football League (VFL).
