= Tom Wenborn =

Australian rules footballer

Personal information
- Full name: Tracey Edgar Wenborn
- Born: 20 June 1880; Prahran, Victoria
- Died: 22 March 1944 (aged 63); Middle Brighton
- Original team: Brighton
- Position: Half back

Playing career^{1}
Years	Club	Games (Goals)
1900–01, 1904–06	South Melbourne	56 (0)
- ^{1} Playing statistics correct to the end of 1906.

Tracey Edgar "Tom" Wenborn (20 June 1880 – 22 March 1944) was an Australian rules footballer who played with South Melbourne in the Victorian Football League (VFL).

== Family ==
The son of Charles Francis Wenborn, and Mary Selina Wenborn, née Wilson, Tracey Edgar Wenborn was born in Prahran, Victoria on 20 June 1880.

He married Georgina Riddell in 1912.

== Football ==
=== Brighton (VFA) ===
He was the captain of the Brighton Football Club in the Victorian Football Association (VFA) in 1909 and 1911.

== Death ==
He died at Middle Brighton on 22 March 1944.
