= Ernest Anderson (footballer) =

Australian rules footballer

Ernie Anderson

Personal information
- Full name: Ernest Anderson
- Born: 17 August 1877; Winchelsea, Victoria
- Died: 22 May 1943 (aged 65); Geelong, Victoria
- Original team: Colac Imperials

Playing career^{1}
Years	Club	Games (Goals)
1898	Geelong	1 (0)
- ^{1} Playing statistics correct to the end of 1898.

Ernest Anderson (17 August 1877 – 22 May 1943) was an Australian rules footballer who played with Geelong in the Victorian Football League (VFL). His only game in the VFL came when he was chosen from the crowd during a game against Carlton, when Geelong were a man short.
