= Ced Hay =

Australian rules footballer

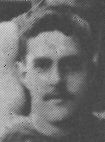

Personal information
- Full name: Cedric Rupert Hay
- Born: 27 September 1880; St Kilda, Victoria
- Died: 8 November 1953 (aged 73); Westholme, British Columbia
- Original team: Cumloden College

Playing career^{1}
Years	Club	Games (Goals)
1900	Melbourne	1 (0)
- ^{1} Playing statistics correct to the end of 1900.

Cedric Rupert Hay (27 September 1880 – 8 November 1953) was an Australian rules footballer who played with Melbourne in the Victorian Football League (VFL).

== Family ==
His brother, Harold Dudley Hay (1881–1955), also played VFL football for Melbourne.

== Football ==
=== Melbourne (VFL) ===
His single game for Melbourne's First XVIII was against Carlton, at Princes Park, on 18 August 1900.

=== "Heritage number" ===
Hay has been given the Melbourne Heritage Number of 82 (his brother, Harold, has 81), based on the order of his debut for the club.
