= Roy Wawn =

Australian rules footballer (1880–1966)

Personal information
- Full name: Royle Newton Wawn
- Born: 20 May 1880; East Brighton, Victoria
- Died: 14 February 1966 (aged 85); Ferny Creek, Victoria
- Original team: Wesley College

Playing career^{1}
Years	Club	Games (Goals)
1900	St Kilda	2 (1)
- ^{1} Playing statistics correct to the end of 1900.

Royle Newton Wawn (20 May 1880 – 14 February 1966) was an Australian rules footballer who played with St Kilda in the Victorian Football League (VFL).

== Family ==
The son of Robert Wawn (1844-1927), and Susannah Wawn, née Lowden, Royle Newton Wawn was born in his family’s East Brighton home on 20 May 1880.

He married Lucy Annabella Syme (1883-1966), at Kew, Victoria on 15 July 1908.

== Education ==
Roy Wawn commenced school at East Brighton State School, but after two years later he transferred to Moorabbin State School.

At the age of 10 years Wawn won a scholarship to Wesley College, Melbourne, where he represented the school in cricket, football, and rowing.

== Football ==
Wawn was mistakenly identified in official VFL records as his younger brother "Vic Wawn".

During his final year at Wesley College, Wawn played two games for St. Kilda in the Victorian Football League.

== Medical career ==
In 1901 Wawn entered the University of Melbourne, securing first class honours in natural philosophy and a winning a scholarship that enabled him to study medicine. Wawn was prominent in intervarsity football and cricket, and he was a member of the University football team that competed in the Metropolitan Football Association.

After his graduation in 1906, Wawn served as a resident medical officer for six months at the Melbourne Hospital, then for nine months at the Women’s Hospital. After commencing in general practice at Cowra, New South Wales, Wawn became interested in obstetrics and commenced work in Prahran with a focus on midwifery and obstetrics. Wawn was appointed to the obstetric staff of the Women’s Hospital in 1917. He transferred to the gynaecological department in 1923, where he worked until his retirement in 1944.

== Death ==
Wawn died at his residence in Ferny Creek, Victoria on 16 February 1966.
