= Pat Cleary (footballer) =

Australian rules footballer

Personal information
- Full name: Patrick Francis Cleary
- Born: 5 February 1874; Kilmore, Victoria
- Died: 1 April 1959 (aged 85); St Vincent's Hospital, Fitzroy, Victoria
- Original team: Collingwood Juniors
- Height: 169 cm (5 ft 7 in)
- Weight: 66 kg (146 lb)

Playing career^{1}
| Years | Club | Games (Goals) |
| 1900 | Collingwood | 3 (0) |
- ^{1} Playing statistics correct to the end of 1900.

Patrick Francis Cleary (5 February 1874 – 1 April 1959) was an Australian rules footballer who played with Collingwood in the Victorian Football League (VFL).

== Family ==
The son of Patrick John Cleary and Margaret Cleary, née Smith, Patrick Francis Cleary was born at Kilmore, Victoria, on 5 February 1874.

He married Jessie Maud Albinson in 1907.

== Death ==
He died at St Vincent's Hospital in Fitzroy on 1 April 1959.
