= Alf Chapman =

Australian rules footballer

Personal information
- Full name: Alfred Chapman
- Born: 3 February 1875; Nagambie, Victoria
- Died: 3 August 1948 (aged 73); Mildura, Victoria

Playing career^{1}
Years	Club	Games (Goals)
1900	South Melbourne	2 (0)
- ^{1} Playing statistics correct to the end of 1900.

Alf Chapman (3 February 1875 – 3 August 1948) was an Australian rules footballer who played for the South Melbourne Football Club in the Victorian Football League (VFL).
