= Dick Walker (Australian footballer) =

Australian rules footballer

Personal information
- Full name: Edward Slann Kishere
- Born: 10 August 1872; Geelong, Victoria
- Died: 3 December 1947 (aged 75); Geelong, Victoria
- Original team: Clarendon
- Height: 179 cm (5 ft 10 in)
- Weight: 72 kg (159 lb)

Playing career^{1}
Years	Club	Games (Goals)
1893–96	Geelong (VFA)	25 (5)
1898	Geelong	14 (10)
1899	Carlton	11 (7)
Total		25 (17)
- ^{1} Playing statistics correct to the end of 1899.

Edward Slann Kishere (Dick Walker) in Geelong, 1899

Edward Slann Kishere (10 August 1872 – 3 December 1947), also known as Dick Walker, was an Australian rules footballer who played with Geelong and Carlton in the Victorian Football League (VFL).

== Family ==
The son of William John Slann Kishere (1830-1871), and Jane Elizabeth Kishere (1842-1919), née Clydesdale, later Mrs. William Charles Walker (1846-1922), whom she married on 2 September 1874, Edward Slann Kishere was born at Aberdeen Street, West Geelong, Victoria, on 10 August 1872.

He married Isabel Sarah Cottrill (1875-1961) at St John's Anglican Church in Burke Road, Camberwell on 7 January 1903. They had two children, Arthur and Joy.

== Football ==
Known as "Dick", he played his entire career as "Dick Walker": i.e., using the family name of his mother's second husband, whom she married when he was just 2 years old.

=== Geelong (VFA) ===
He played in 25 matches (scoring 5 goals) for the Geelong team that played in the VFA from 1893 to 1896.

=== Geelong (VFL) ===
He played in 14 matches (scoring 10 goals) for the Geelong team that played in the VFL in 1898.

=== Carlton (VFL) ===
He played in 11 matches (scoring 7 goals) for the Carlton team that played in the VFL in 1899.

== After football ==
He had worked for the Melbourne Fire Brigade from 1900. In 1921 the Kisheres moved back to Geelong. As "Mr. E.S. Kishere", he was the proprietor of the Annears Furnishing Warehouse in Ryrie Street, Geelong. From 1925 he was the proprietor of "Kisheres" furniture shop at 205 Moorabool Street, Geelong. In the 1940s he coached the Geelong College rowing team.

== Death ==
He died in a Geelong hospital on 3 December 1947.
