= Alec King =

Australian rules footballer

Personal information
- Full name: Alexander Mercer King
- Born: 1 June 1874; Ballarat East, Victoria
- Died: 19 May 1954 (aged 79); Melbourne

Playing career^{1}
Years	Club	Games (Goals)
1898	Geelong	6 (3)
- ^{1} Playing statistics correct to the end of 1898.

Alexander Mercer King OBE (1 June 1874 – 19 May 1954) was a Mayor of Ballarat and an Australian rules footballer who played for the Geelong Football Club in the Victorian Football League (VFL).

King, who conducted a printing business in Ballarat for many years, was a keen sportsman, and in his youth captained both the Ballarat and Geelong West football teams. He was a life member of both Ballarat's football club and rowing club, a member of the State Health Commission and was the first chairman of the Country Fire Authority.

In 1941 he was appointed as an Officer of the Order of the British Empire (OBE) for "service as the Mayor of Ballarat, Victoria".
