= Harold Hay =

Australian rules footballer

Personal information
- Full name: Harold Dudley Hay
- Born: 31 December 1881; St Kilda, Victoria
- Died: 27 December 1955 (aged 73); Barooga, New South Wales
- Original team: Cumloden College

Playing career^{1}
Years	Club	Games (Goals)
1900	Melbourne	7 (2)
- ^{1} Playing statistics correct to the end of 1900.

Career highlights
- VFL premiership player: 1900

Harold Dudley Hay (31 December 1881 – 27 December 1955) was an Australian rules footballer who played for the Melbourne Football Club in the Victorian Football League (VFL).

== Family ==
His brother, Cedric Rupert Hay (1880–1953), also played VFL football for Melbourne.

== Football ==
=== Melbourne (VFL) ===
Hay became one of the club's first premiership players, playing in the 1900 VFL Grand Final, under the captaincy of Dick Wardill. He made his debut against South Melbourne in Round 13 of the 1900 VFL season, at the Melbourne Cricket Ground.

=== "Heritage number" ===
Hay has been given the Melbourne Heritage Number of 81 (his brother, Ced, has 82), based on the order of his debut for the club.

== Death ==
Hay died at his home, the Langi Oonah homestead, in Barooga, New South Wales, just across the Murray River from Cobram, on 27 December 1955.
