= Peter Campbell (Australian footballer, born 1875) =

Australian rules footballer

Personal information
- Full name: Peter Campbell
- Born: 29 April 1875
- Died: 14 September 1948 (aged 73); Davington, South Australia
- Original team: Parkville Juniors

Playing career^{1}
Years	Club	Games (Goals)
1900	Carlton	3 (1)
- ^{1} Playing statistics correct to the end of 1900.

Peter Campbell (29 April 1875 – 14 September 1948) was an Australian rules footballer who played with Carlton in the Victorian Football League (VFL).

== Family ==
The son of Charles Campbell (1835–1881), and Anna Campbell, née Lippiatt, Peter Campbell was born on 29 April 1875.

== Football ==
Recruited from Parkville Junior in 1900, Campbell played 3 games for Carlton: two at full-forward (he kicked 1 goal in two matches), and one at full-back.

== Death ==
He died at "Bower Cottages" in the Adelaide suburb of Davington (now part of Semaphore Park) on 14 September 1948.
