= Bryan McGuigan =

Australian rules footballer

Personal information
- Full name: Bryan Fitzpatrick McGuigan
- Born: 6 September 1880; Carlton, Victoria
- Died: 8 September 1954 (aged 74); Parkville, Victoria

Playing career^{1}
Years	Club	Games (Goals)
1900	Melbourne	2 (0)
- ^{1} Playing statistics correct to the end of 1900.

Bryan Fitzpatrick McGuigan (6 September 1880 – 8 September 1954) was an Australian rules footballer who played with Melbourne in the Victorian Football League (VFL).
