= 1899 VFL season =

Third season of the Victorian Football League (VFL)

1899 VFL premiership season
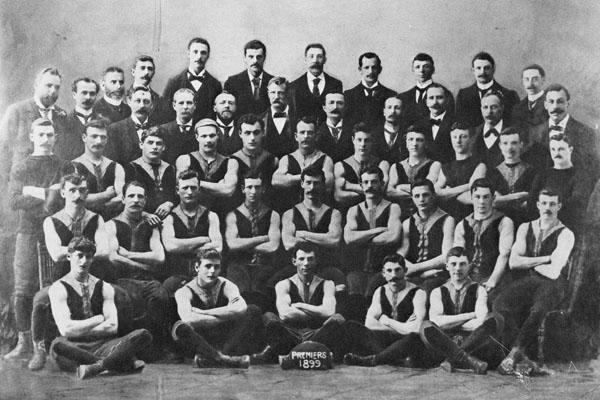
- Fitzroy 1899 VFL premiership team
- Date: 13 May – 16 September 1899
- Teams: 8
- Premiers: Fitzroy; 2nd premiership
- Minor premiers: Fitzroy; 1st minor premiership
- Leading goalkicker medallist: Eddy James (Geelong); 31 goals
- Matches played: 69

The 1899 VFL season was the third season of the Victorian Football League (VFL), the highest-level senior Australian rules football competition in Victoria. The season featured eight clubs and ran from 13 May to 16 September, comprising a 14-round home-and-away season followed by a finals series featuring all eight clubs.

Fitzroy won the premiership, defeating South Melbourne by one point in the 1899 VFL grand final; it was Fitzroy's second (consecutive and overall) VFL premiership. Fitzroy also won the minor premiership by finishing atop the home-and-away ladder with an 11–3 win–loss record. Geelong's Eddy James won his second leading goalkicker medal as the league's leading goalkicker.

== Background ==
In 1899, the VFL competition consisted of eight teams of 18 on-the-field players each, with no "reserves" (although any of the 18 players who had left the playing field for any reason could later resume their place on the field at any time during the match).

Each team played each other twice in a home-and-away season of 14 rounds.

Once the 14 round home-and-away season had finished, the 1899 VFL Premiers were determined by the specific format and conventions of the 1898 VFL finals system.

== Home-and-away season ==
=== Round 1 ===
	Round 1
Saturday, 13 May (3:00 pm)	South Melbourne 10.13 (73)	def.	Carlton 2.6 (18)	Lake Oval
Saturday, 13 May (3:00 pm)	Geelong 8.6 (54)	def.	Collingwood 3.9 (27)	Corio Oval
Saturday, 13 May (3:00 pm)	Fitzroy 6.11 (47)	def.	Essendon 0.9 (9)	Brunswick Street Oval
Saturday, 13 May (3:00 pm)	Melbourne 16.20 (116)	def.	St Kilda 3.5 (23)	Melbourne Cricket Ground

=== Round 2 ===
	Round 2
Saturday, 20 May (3:00 pm)	Carlton 1.5 (11)	def. by	Geelong 5.6 (36)	Princes Park
Saturday, 20 May (3:00 pm)	Collingwood 4.3 (27)	def. by	Melbourne 7.12 (54)	Victoria Park
Saturday, 20 May (3:00 pm)	St Kilda 3.2 (20)	def. by	Essendon 8.18 (66)	Junction Oval
Saturday, 20 May (3:00 pm)	South Melbourne 5.8 (38)	def. by	Fitzroy 6.6 (42)	Lake Oval

=== Round 3 ===
	Round 3
Wednesday, 24 May (11:00 am)	Collingwood 13.9 (87)	def.	St Kilda 2.6 (18)	Victoria Park
Wednesday, 24 May (3:00 pm)	Carlton 3.1 (19)	def. by	Melbourne 6.9 (45)	Princes Park
Wednesday, 24 May (3:00 pm)	Essendon 1.9 (15)	def.	South Melbourne 0.9 (9)	East Melbourne Cricket Ground
Wednesday, 24 May (3:00 pm)	Geelong 0.8 (8)	def. by	Fitzroy 4.8 (32)	Corio Oval

=== Round 4 ===
	Round 4
Saturday, 27 May (3:00 pm)	Essendon 6.12 (48)	def.	Carlton 1.3 (9)	East Melbourne Cricket Ground
Saturday, 27 May (3:00 pm)	South Melbourne 3.4 (22)	def. by	Collingwood 3.11 (29)	Lake Oval
Saturday, 27 May (3:00 pm)	Fitzroy 7.14 (56)	def.	St Kilda 5.3 (33)	Brunswick Street Oval
Saturday, 27 May (3:00 pm)	Melbourne 4.8 (32)	def.	Geelong 4.3 (27)	Melbourne Cricket Ground

=== Round 5 ===
	Round 5
Saturday, 3 June (3:00 pm)	Carlton 3.3 (21)	def. by	Collingwood 7.10 (52)	Princes Park
Saturday, 3 June (3:00 pm)	Geelong 3.10 (28)	def.	Essendon 3.6 (24)	Corio Oval
Saturday, 3 June (3:00 pm)	Melbourne 4.11 (35)	def.	Fitzroy 3.6 (24)	Melbourne Cricket Ground
Saturday, 3 June (3:00 pm)	St Kilda 4.9 (33)	def. by	South Melbourne 10.10 (70)	Junction Oval

=== Round 6 ===
	Round 6
Saturday, 10 June (3:00 pm)	St Kilda 4.5 (29)	def. by	Carlton 4.7 (31)	Junction Oval
Saturday, 10 June (3:00 pm)	Collingwood 1.7 (13)	def. by	Fitzroy 5.5 (35)	Victoria Park
Saturday, 10 June (3:00 pm)	Essendon 4.6 (30)	def.	Melbourne 1.10 (16)	East Melbourne Cricket Ground
Saturday, 10 June (3:00 pm)	South Melbourne 5.5 (35)	def.	Geelong 3.1 (19)	Lake Oval

=== Round 7 ===
	Round 7
Saturday, 17 June (3:00 pm)	Fitzroy 5.15 (45)	def.	Carlton 1.7 (13)	Brunswick Street Oval
Saturday, 17 June (3:00 pm)	Collingwood 6.12 (48)	def.	Essendon 4.4 (28)	Victoria Park
Saturday, 17 June (3:00 pm)	St Kilda 3.13 (31)	def. by	Geelong 12.6 (78)	Junction Oval
Saturday, 17 June (3:00 pm)	Melbourne 7.8 (50)	def.	South Melbourne 6.7 (43)	Melbourne Cricket Ground

=== Round 8 ===
	Round 8
Saturday, 24 June (3:00 pm)	Carlton 3.6 (24)	def.	South Melbourne 0.5 (5)	Princes Park
Saturday, 24 June (3:00 pm)	Collingwood 2.8 (20)	def. by	Geelong 9.7 (61)	Victoria Park
Saturday, 24 June (3:00 pm)	Essendon 6.15 (51)	def. by	Fitzroy 10.3 (63)	East Melbourne Cricket Ground
Saturday, 24 June (3:00 pm)	St Kilda 2.8 (20)	def. by	Melbourne 5.7 (37)	Junction Oval

=== Round 9 ===
	Round 9
Saturday, 8 July (3:00 pm)	Geelong 9.9 (63)	def.	Carlton 5.3 (33)	Corio Oval
Saturday, 8 July (3:00 pm)	Melbourne 1.7 (13)	def. by	Collingwood 3.3 (21)	Melbourne Cricket Ground
Saturday, 8 July (3:00 pm)	Essendon 11.19 (85)	def.	St Kilda 1.0 (6)	East Melbourne Cricket Ground
Saturday, 8 July (3:00 pm)	Fitzroy 9.8 (62)	def.	South Melbourne 4.5 (29)	Brunswick Street Oval

=== Round 10 ===
	Round 10
Saturday, 15 July (3:00 pm)	Melbourne 7.12 (54)	def.	Carlton 3.4 (22)	Melbourne Cricket Ground
Saturday, 15 July (3:00 pm)	St Kilda 1.5 (11)	def. by	Collingwood 13.16 (94)	Junction Oval
Saturday, 15 July (3:00 pm)	South Melbourne 5.5 (35)	def. by	Essendon 7.9 (51)	Lake Oval
Saturday, 15 July (3:00 pm)	Fitzroy 3.5 (23)	def. by	Geelong 8.10 (58)	Brunswick Street Oval

=== Round 11 ===
	Round 11
Saturday, 22 July (3:00 pm)	Carlton 3.8 (26)	def. by	Essendon 8.9 (57)	Princes Park
Saturday, 22 July (3:00 pm)	Collingwood 5.9 (39)	def.	South Melbourne 5.6 (36)	Victoria Park
Saturday, 22 July (3:00 pm)	St Kilda 4.6 (30)	def. by	Fitzroy 12.12 (84)	Junction Oval
Saturday, 22 July (3:00 pm)	Geelong 5.6 (36)	def.	Melbourne 2.10 (22)	Corio Oval

=== Round 12 ===
	Round 12
Saturday, 29 July (3:00 pm)	Collingwood 5.13 (43)	def.	Carlton 4.3 (27)	Victoria Park
Saturday, 29 July (3:00 pm)	Essendon 10.7 (67)	def.	Geelong 6.7 (43)	East Melbourne Cricket Ground
Saturday, 29 July (3:00 pm)	Fitzroy 6.5 (41)	def.	Melbourne 4.9 (33)	Brunswick Street Oval
Saturday, 29 July (3:00 pm)	South Melbourne 8.9 (57)	def.	St Kilda 3.6 (24)	Lake Oval

=== Round 13 ===
	Round 13
Saturday, 5 August (3:00 pm)	Carlton 6.11 (47)	def.	St Kilda 1.2 (8)	Princes Park
Saturday, 5 August (3:00 pm)	Fitzroy 3.7 (25)	def. by	Collingwood 5.7 (37)	Brunswick Street Oval
Saturday, 5 August (3:00 pm)	Melbourne 3.7 (25)	def. by	Essendon 5.8 (38)	Melbourne Cricket Ground
Saturday, 5 August (3:00 pm)	Geelong 7.12 (54)	def.	South Melbourne 3.9 (27)	Corio Oval

=== Round 14 ===
	Round 14
Saturday, 12 August (3:00 pm)	Carlton 2.4 (16)	def. by	Fitzroy 5.9 (39)	Princes Park
Saturday, 12 August (3:00 pm)	Essendon 4.7 (31)	def. by	Collingwood 8.5 (53)	East Melbourne Cricket Ground
Saturday, 12 August (3:00 pm)	Geelong 16.23 (119)	def.	St Kilda 0.2 (2)	Corio Oval
Saturday, 12 August (3:00 pm)	South Melbourne 6.13 (49)	def.	Melbourne 6.6 (42)	Lake Oval

== Ladder ==
(P)	Premiers
	Section A
	Section B

#	Team	P	W	L	D	PF	PA	%	Pts
1	Fitzroy (P)	14	11	3	0	618	403	153.3	44
2	Geelong	14	10	4	0	684	386	177.2	40
3	Collingwood	14	10	4	0	590	436	135.3	40
4	Essendon	14	9	5	0	600	428	140.2	36
5	Melbourne	14	8	6	0	574	420	136.7	32
6	South Melbourne	14	5	9	0	528	502	105.2	20
7	Carlton	14	3	11	0	317	597	53.1	12
8	St Kilda	14	0	14	0	288	1027	28.0	0

Rules for classification: 1. premiership points; 2. percentage; 3. points for
Average score: 37.5
Source: AFL Tables

== Progression by round ==
Points by round
Team ╲ Round	1	2	3	4	5	6	7	8	9	10	11	12	13	14
Fitzroy	4	8	12	16	16	20	24	28	32	32	36	40	40	44
Geelong	4	8	8	8	12	12	16	20	24	28	32	32	36	40
Collingwood	0	0	4	8	12	12	16	16	20	24	28	32	36	40
Essendon	0	4	8	12	12	16	16	16	20	24	28	32	36	36
Melbourne	4	8	12	16	20	20	24	28	28	32	32	32	32	32
South Melbourne	4	4	4	4	8	12	12	12	12	12	12	16	16	20
Carlton	0	0	0	0	0	4	4	8	8	8	8	8	12	12
St Kilda	0	0	0	0	0	0	0	0	0	0	0	0	0	0

== Finals series ==
=== Sectional rounds ===
==== Sectional round 1 ====
	Sectional round 1
Saturday, 26 August (2:30 pm)	Fitzroy 5.11 (41)	def.	Carlton 6.4 (40)	Brunswick Street Oval
Saturday, 26 August (2:30 pm)	Melbourne 3.7 (25)	def. by	Collingwood 6.9 (45)	Lake Oval
Saturday, 26 August (2:30 pm)	Essendon 16.24 (120)	def.	St Kilda 3.4 (22)	East Melbourne Cricket Ground
Saturday, 26 August (2:30 pm)	Geelong 5.8 (38)	def. by	South Melbourne 6.5 (41)	Corio Oval

==== Sectional round 2 ====
	Sectional round 2
Saturday, 2 September (2:30 pm)	Collingwood 5.8 (38)	def.	Carlton 2.5 (17)	Victoria Park
Saturday, 2 September (2:30 pm)	Essendon 4.15 (39)	def. by	Geelong 6.11 (47)	East Melbourne Cricket Ground
Saturday, 2 September (2:30 pm)	Fitzroy 5.10 (40)	def.	Melbourne 0.2 (2)	Brunswick Street Oval
Saturday, 2 September (2:30 pm)	St Kilda 1.6 (12)	def. by	South Melbourne 12.10 (82)	Junction Oval

==== Sectional round 3 ====
	Sectional round 3
Saturday, 9 September (2:30 pm)	Carlton 6.5 (41)	def.	Melbourne 2.4 (16)	Princes Park
Saturday, 9 September (2:30 pm)	Collingwood 4.7 (31)	def. by	Fitzroy 6.9 (45)	Victoria Park
Saturday, 9 September (2:30 pm)	South Melbourne 3.10 (28)	def.	Essendon 2.1 (13)	Lake Oval
Saturday, 9 September (2:30 pm)	Geelong 23.24 (162)	def.	St Kilda 0.1 (1)	Corio Oval
St Kilda's 1 point set and, as of 2026, still holds the record for the lowest score in AFL/VFL history.

==== Section A ladder ====
Qualified for finals

#	Team	P	W	L	D	PF	PA	%	Pts
1	Fitzroy	3	3	0	0	126	73	172.6	12
2	Collingwood	3	2	1	0	114	87	131.0	8
3	Carlton	3	1	2	0	98	95	103.2	4
4	Melbourne	3	0	3	0	43	126	34.1	0

Rules for classification: 1. premiership points; 2. percentage; 3. points for
Source: AFL Tables

==== Section B ladder ====
Qualified for finals

#	Team	P	W	L	D	PF	PA	%	Pts
1	South Melbourne	3	3	0	0	151	63	239.7	12
2	Geelong	3	2	1	0	247	81	304.9	8
3	Essendon	3	1	2	0	172	97	177.3	4
4	St Kilda	3	0	3	0	35	364	9.6	0

Rules for classification: 1. premiership points; 2. percentage; 3. points for
Source: AFL Tables

=== Grand final ===
Grand final
16 September, Junction Oval
A1	Fitzroy	3.9 (27)
B1	South Melbourne	3.8 (26)

Starting time is local time. Source: AFL Tables

	Grand final
Saturday, 16 September (2:50 pm)	Fitzroy 3.9 (27)	def.	South Melbourne 3.8 (26)	Junction Oval (crowd: 4,823)

== Win–loss table ==
The following table can be sorted from biggest winning margin to biggest losing margin for each round. If two or more matches in a round are decided by the same margin, these margins are sorted by percentage (i.e. the lowest-scoring winning team is ranked highest and the lowest-scoring losing team is ranked lowest). Opponents are listed above the margins and home matches are in bold.

+	Win	Qualified for finals
−	Loss	Eliminated
X	Bye	

Team	Home-and-away season														Home- and-away ladder	Finals series				
Team	Home-and-away season														Home- and-away ladder	Sectional rounds			Sectional ladders	GF
Team	1	2	3	4	5	6	7	8	9	10	11	12	13	14	Home- and-away ladder	S1	S2	S3	Sectional ladders	GF
Carlton	SM −55	**GEE** **−25**	**MEL** **−26**	ESS −39	**COL** **−31**	STK +2	FIT −32	**SM** **+19**	GEE −30	MEL −32	**ESS** **−31**	COL −16	**STK** **+39**	**FIT** **−23**	7 (3–11–0)	FIT −1	COL −21	**MEL** **+25**	A3 (1–2–0)	
Collingwood	GEE −27	**MEL** **−27**	**STK** **+69**	SM +7	CAR +31	**FIT** **−22**	**ESS** **+20**	**GEE** **−41**	MEL +8	STK +83	**SM** **+3**	**CAR** **+16**	FIT +12	ESS +22	3 (10–4–0)	MEL +20	**CAR** **+21**	**FIT** **−14**	A2 (2–1–0)	
Essendon	FIT −38	STK +46	**SM** **+6**	**CAR** **+39**	GEE −4	**MEL** **+14**	COL −20	**FIT** **−12**	**STK** **+79**	SM +16	CAR +31	**GEE** **+24**	MEL +13	**COL** **−22**	4 (9–5–0)	**STK** **+98**	**GEE** **−8**	SM −15	B3 (1–2–0)	
Fitzroy	**ESS** **+38**	SM +4	GEE +24	**STK** **+23**	MEL −11	COL +22	**CAR** **+32**	ESS +12	**SM** **+33**	**GEE** **−35**	STK +54	**MEL** **+8**	**COL** **−12**	CAR +23	1 (11–3–0)	**CAR** **+1**	**MEL** **+38**	COL +14	A1 (3–0–0)	**SM** **+1**
Geelong	**COL** **+27**	CAR +25	**FIT** **−24**	MEL −5	**ESS** **+4**	SM −16	STK +47	COL +41	**CAR** **+30**	FIT +35	**MEL** **+14**	ESS −24	**SM** **+27**	**STK** **+117**	2 (10–4–0)	**SM** **−3**	ESS +8	**STK** **+161**	B2 (2–1–0)	
Melbourne	**STK** **+93**	COL +27	CAR +26	**GEE** **+5**	**FIT** **+11**	ESS −14	**SM** **+7**	STK +17	**COL** **−8**	**CAR** **+32**	GEE −14	FIT −8	**ESS** **−13**	SM −7	5 (8–6–0)	**COL** **−20**	FIT −38	CAR −25	A4 (0–3–0)	
South Melbourne	**CAR** **+55**	**FIT** **−4**	ESS −6	**COL** **−7**	STK +37	**GEE** **+16**	MEL −7	CAR −19	FIT −33	**ESS** **−16**	COL −3	**STK** **+33**	GEE −27	**MEL** **+7**	6 (5–9–0)	GEE +3	STK +70	**ESS** **+15**	B1 (3–0–0)	FIT −1
St Kilda	MEL −93	**ESS** **−46**	COL −69	FIT −23	**SM** **−37**	**CAR** **−2**	**GEE** **−47**	**MEL** **−17**	ESS −79	**COL** **−83**	**FIT** **−54**	SM −33	CAR −39	GEE −117	8 (0–14–0)	ESS −98	**SM** **−70**	GEE −161	B4 (0–3–0)	

Source: AFL Tables

== Season notes ==
- The VFL reduced the size of its teams from 20 to 18 on-the-field players, with no "reserves". In doing this, the number of followers was reduced from five (four rucks and a rover) to three (two rucks and a rover).
- The first seven kicks of the round 14 game between Carlton and Fitzroy were free kicks awarded by the umpire.
- In the third sectional round, Geelong set records for the highest score in a game, scoring 23.24 (162), and the highest winning margin of 161 points, against St Kilda. These records both stood for twelve years and twenty years respectively.
- St Kilda's score of 0.1 (1) in the same match set the record for the lowest score in a VFL/AFL game, which has neither been matched nor broken since. Notably, St Kilda's solitary behind was actually the first score of the match.
- Geelong's Jim McShane kicked 11 goals in the same match against St Kilda, a VFL record that was not equalled until Collingwood's Dick Lee's 11 goals in 1914 and not broken until 1919.
- At the end of the 1899 season, in the process of naming his own "champion player", the football correspondent for The Argus ("Old Boy"), selected a team of the best players of the 1899 VFL competition:
  Backs: Maurie Collins (Essendon), Bill Proudfoot (Collingwood), Peter Burns (Geelong); Halfbacks: Pat Hickey (Fitzroy), George Davidson (South Melbourne), Alf Wood (Melbourne); Centres: Fred Leach (Collingwood), Firth McCallum (Geelong), Harry Wright (Essendon); Wings: Charlie Pannam (Collingwood), Eddie Drohan (Fitzroy), Herb Howson (South Melbourne); Forwards: Bill Jackson (Essendon), Eddy James (Geelong), Charlie Colgan (South Melbourne); Ruck: Mick Pleass (South Melbourne), Frank Hailwood (Collingwood), Joe McShane (Geelong); Rovers: Dick Condon (Collingwood), Bill McSpeerin (Fitzroy), Teddy Rankin (Geelong).
  From those he considered to be the three best players — that is, Condon, Hickey, and Pleass — he selected Pat Hickey as his "champion player" of the season. ('Old Boy', "Football: A Review of the Season", (Monday, 18 September 1899), p.6).

== Awards ==
- The 1899 VFL Premiership team was Fitzroy.
- The VFL's leading goalkicker was Eddy James of Geelong with 31 goals.
- The Argus newspaper's "Player of the Year" was Fitzroy's Pat Hickey.

== Sources ==
- 1899 VFL season at AFL Tables
- 1899 VFL season at Australian Football
