= Joe Rouse =

Australian rules footballer

Personal information
- Full name: John Hewitt Rouse
- Born: 13 May 1883; Collingwood, Victoria
- Died: 1 June 1951 (aged 68); Blackburn, Victoria
- Original team: Collingwood Juniors
- Height: 174 cm (5 ft 9 in)
- Weight: 67 kg (148 lb)

Playing career^{1}
Years	Club	Games (Goals)
1900–01	Collingwood	6 (4)
- ^{1} Playing statistics correct to the end of 1901.

John Hewitt "Joe" Rouse (13 May 1883 – 1 June 1951) was an Australian rules footballer who played with Collingwood in the Victorian Football League (VFL).
