= William Richardson (footballer) =

Australian rules footballer

Personal information
- Full name: William Kendall Richardson
- Born: 10 February 1880; Geelong, Victoria
- Died: 10 July 1903 (aged 23); Gooram near Euroa, Victoria

Playing career^{1}
Years	Club	Games (Goals)
1900	St Kilda	3 (0)
- ^{1} Playing statistics correct to the end of 1900.

William Kendall Richardson (10 February 1880 – 10 July 1903) was an Australian rules footballer who played for the St Kilda Football Club in the Victorian Football League (VFL).

He died from consumption in July 1903 at the age of 23.
