= Harold Riggall =

Australian rules footballer

Personal information
- Full name: Harold William Riggall
- Born: 24 January 1882; Prahran, Victoria
- Died: 11 January 1930 (aged 47); Toorak, Victoria
- Original team: Cumloden College

Playing career^{1}
Years	Club	Games (Goals)
1900	Melbourne	1 (1)
- ^{1} Playing statistics correct to the end of 1900.

Harold William Riggall (24 January 1882 – 11 January 1930) was an Australian rules footballer who played with Melbourne in the Victorian Football League (VFL).
