= George Horman =

Australian rules footballer

Personal information
- Full name: George Horman
- Born: 1 October 1883; Geelong, Victoria
- Died: 22 November 1952 (aged 69); Bendigo, Victoria
- Original team: Chilwell

Playing career^{1}
Years	Club	Games (Goals)
1904	Geelong	1 (0)
- ^{1} Playing statistics correct to the end of 1904.

George Horman (1 October 1883 – 22 November 1952) was an Australian rules footballer who played a single game with Geelong in the Victorian Football League (VFL) in 1904.

== Family ==
The son of William Robert Horman (1850–1921), and Hannah Horman (1847–1921), née Cameron, George Horman was born in Geelong on 1 October 1883.

His older brother, James Horman (1877–1960), also played for both Chiwell and Geelong.
