= Fred Monkhouse =

Australian rules footballer

Personal information
- Full name: Frederick Joseph Monkhouse
- Born: 10 June 1871; Richmond, Victoria
- Died: 18 September 1946 (aged 75); Northcote, Victoria

Playing career^{1}
Years	Club	Games (Goals)
1900	South Melbourne	2 (1)
- ^{1} Playing statistics correct to the end of 1900.

Frederick Joseph Monkhouse (10 June 1871 – 18 September 1946) was an Australian rules footballer who played with South Melbourne in the Victorian Football League (VFL).
