= Ned Moran =

Australian rules footballer

Personal information
- Full name: Edward Michael Moran
- Born: 29 November 1876; Geelong, Victoria
- Died: 11 February 1918 (aged 41); East Melbourne, Victoria

Playing career^{1}
Years	Club	Games (Goals)
1897	Geelong	2 (0)
- ^{1} Playing statistics correct to the end of 1897.

Edward Michael Moran (29 November 1876 – 11 February 1918) was an Australian rules footballer who played with Geelong in the Victorian Football League (VFL).
