= Mike O'Hehir =

Australian rules footballer

Personal information
- Full name: Michael O'Hehir
- Born: 9 May 1876; Ballan, Victoria
- Died: 30 July 1940 (aged 64); Ballan, Victoria

Playing career^{1}
Years	Club	Games (Goals)
1900–01	South Melbourne	18 (2)
- ^{1} Playing statistics correct to the end of 1901.

Mike O'Hehir (9 May 1876 – 30 July 1940) was an Australian rules footballer who played with South Melbourne in the Victorian Football League (VFL).
