= Stan Enfield =

Australian rules footballer

Personal information
- Full name: John Edward Enfield
- Born: 31 August 1873; Sydney
- Died: 1 October 1935 (aged 62); Sydney

Playing career^{1}
Years	Club	Games (Goals)
1897	Geelong	3 (3)
- ^{1} Playing statistics correct to the end of 1897.

John Edward "Stan" Enfield (31 August 1873 – 1 October 1935) was an Australian rules footballer who played with Geelong in the Victorian Football League (VFL).
