= John Lucas (footballer) =

Australian rules footballer (1869–1953)

Personal information
- Full name: John Lucas
- Born: 27 June 1869; Birregurra, Victoria
- Died: 25 November 1953 (aged 84); Bellevue Hill, New South Wales

Playing career^{1}
Years	Club	Games (Goals)
1897	Geelong	1 (0)
- ^{1} Playing statistics correct to the end of 1897.

John Lucas (27 June 1869 – 25 November 1953) was an Australian rules footballer who played with Geelong in the Victorian Football League (VFL).
