= Les Bailiff =

Australian rules footballer

Personal information
- Full name: Leslie Eugene Richard Bailiff
- Born: 16 August 1877; Geelong, Victoria
- Died: 25 July 1948 (aged 70); Geelong West, Victoria
- Original team: Geelong West
- Position: Wing

Playing career^{1}
Years	Club	Games (Goals)
1898, 1900–03	Geelong	63 (0)
- ^{1} Playing statistics correct to the end of 1903.

Leslie Eugene Richard Bailiff (16 August 1877 – 25 July 1948) was an Australian rules footballer who played with Geelong in the Victorian Football League (VFL).
