= Heber Quinton =

Australian rules footballer

Personal information
- Full name: George Hector Quinton
- Born: 2 November 1883; Moorooduc, Victoria
- Died: 25 April 1907 (aged 23); Katoomba
- Original team: Geelong College
- Height: 163 cm (5 ft 4 in)
- Weight: 53 kg (117 lb)

Playing career^{1}
Years	Club	Games (Goals)
1900	Geelong	1 (0)
- ^{1} Playing statistics correct to the end of 1900.

George "Heber" Quinton (2 November 1883 – 25 April 1907) was an Australian rules footballer who played with Geelong in the Victorian Football League (VFL).
