= Len Strickland =

Australian rules footballer (1880–1949)

Personal information
- Full name: Lennard John Strickland
- Born: 13 May 1880; Port Augusta, South Australia
- Died: 26 August 1949 (aged 69); Cape Town, South Africa
- Original team: Geelong College

Playing career^{1}
Years	Club	Games (Goals)
1900	Geelong	5 (0)
- ^{1} Playing statistics correct to the end of 1900.

Lennard John Strickland (13 May 1880 – 26 August 1949) was an Australian rules footballer who played with Geelong in the Victorian Football League (VFL).
