= Doug Watsford =

Australian rules footballer

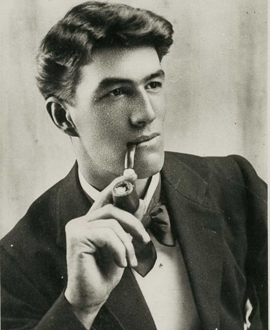

Personal information
- Full name: John Douglas Watsford
- Born: 27 February 1876; Sebastopol, Victoria
- Died: 4 December 1915 (aged 39); Kangaroo Flat, Victoria
- Original team: Dandenong
- Height: 184 cm (6 ft 0 in)
- Weight: 82 kg (181 lb)

Playing career^{1}
Years	Club	Games (Goals)
1899–1900	Collingwood	21 (7)
- ^{1} Playing statistics correct to the end of 1900.

John Douglas Watsford (27 February 1876 – 4 December 1915) was an Australian rules footballer who played with Collingwood in the Victorian Football League (VFL).
