= Ernie Leighton =

Australian rules footballer

Personal information
- Full name: Ernest Bartholomew Leighton
- Born: 24 March 1872; Geelong, Victoria
- Died: 1 August 1959 (aged 87); Geelong, Victoria
- Height: 183 cm (6 ft 0 in)
- Weight: 89 kg (196 lb)

Playing career^{1}
Years	Club	Games (Goals)
1898–99	Geelong	29 (18)
- ^{1} Playing statistics correct to the end of 1899.

Ernie Leighton (24 March 1872 – 1 August 1959) was an Australian rules footballer who played with Geelong in the Victorian Football League (VFL).
