= Tom Maguire (footballer) =

Australian rules footballer (1873–1944)

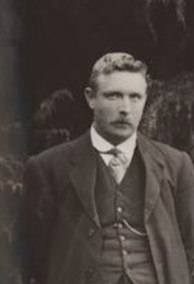

Personal information
- Full name: Thomas Joseph Maguire
- Born: 24 December 1873; Timor, Victoria
- Died: 26 August 1944 (aged 70); Moonee Ponds, Victoria
- Original team: Wellington

Playing career^{1}
Years	Club	Games (Goals)
1897–98	Geelong	13 (0)
- ^{1} Playing statistics correct to the end of 1898.

Thomas Joseph Maguire (24 December 1873 – 26 August 1944) was an Australian rules footballer who played with Geelong in the Victorian Football League (VFL).

== Family ==
Thomas Maguire, aged 26 married Catherine Frances Kennelly, aged 25 in Ballarat, Victoria, in 1900. Tom and Catherine moved to Ararat and this is where five of the children were born between 1901 and 1910. William Joseph (1901), Mary Elizabeth (1903), Thomas “Jack” (1905), Ethel Josephine (1906), Joseph (1910). The family moved to Brunswick where Catherine Margaret (1913) was born. Tom, Catherine and their children moved to Beechworth where Tom was appointed Head Warden of Beechworth Asylum. Another daughter Imelda Mary (1916) was born.

Later in life, Thomas and Catherine moved to Moonee Ponds, Tom Maguire dying in 1944, aged 70. He is buried at the Melbourne Cemetery. Catherine died in 1970, aged 95. She is buried alongside her husband.

== Football ==
Maguire played for Wellington Football Club (1885–1886). They were Premiers in 1886. He was then asked to train with the Geelong Football Club. He represented Geelong Football Club in a lead up game against Ballarat in Ballarat on the 30 Apr 1897.

Maguire was selected to represent Geelong Football Club in its inaugural game in the Victoria Football League on 7 May 1897 (the 7th player to represent Geelong) aged 23 years 135 days. The game was against Essendon and was played at Corio Oval, located in Eastern Park. Geelong 3 goal 6 points lost to Essendon 7 goals 5 behinds. He played 12 games in 1897 and one game in 1898. Maguire played on the flank.

Maguire suffered a serious dislocation of his shoulder in Round 10 of the 1897 season

"during which Maguire was violently thrown, and he retired from the field with a dislocation of the right shoulder”

He missed the next three games and returned in Round 14, the last round of the season, against St Kilda. He then played in all three semi-finals of the 1897 season. Maguire represented Geelong Football Club in a lead up game against Ballarat in Geelong on the 7 May 1898 prior to the start of the 1898 season but his final senior game was in Round 1 of the 1898 season against Collingwood at Victoria Park on 14 May. Early in the game Maguire again dislocated his shoulder,

"Almost at the outset they were placed at a further disadvantage through the retirement of Maguire with a dislocated shoulder".

and this injury forced him to retire from playing VFL football.

In 1899 on the 5 May he represented a combined side that played the Geelong Football Club as a lead up game. The following week Maguire played for the Wellington Football Club in the 1898 season. He was selected and played in the first five games for Wellington Football Club in the 1899 season and then didn't play for the remainder of the season.

Interestingly when Maguire moved to Beechworth with his family he played football with the Beechworth Football Club in 1913, aged 39.

== Cricket ==
Tom played cricket for the Asylum Cricket Club. He was President of the club and player when they won the premiership on 1 April 1914 he took 6 wickets for 21 runs, aged 40.
