= Jack Hardiman =

Australian rules footballer

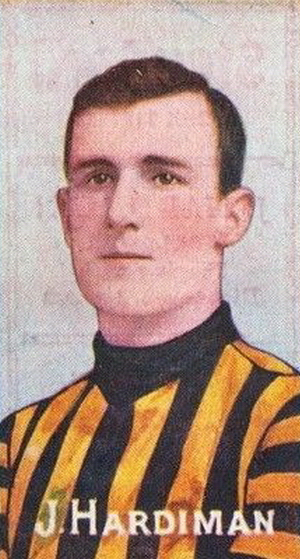
- Cigarette card of Hardiman in 1909

Personal information
- Full name: John Francis Hardiman
- Born: 27 July 1877; Geelong, Victoria
- Died: 17 November 1955 (aged 78); Geelong, Victoria

Playing career^{1}
Years	Club	Games (Goals)
1900–01	Geelong	21 (11)
1908	Richmond	15 (5)
Total		36 (16)
- ^{1} Playing statistics correct to the end of 1908.

John Francis Hardiman (27 July 1877 – 17 November 1955) was an Australian rules footballer who played with Geelong and Richmond in the Victorian Football League (VFL).
