= Martin Gullan =

Australian rules footballer

Personal information
- Full name: Martin Stirling Gullan
- Born: 5 October 1876; Ballarat, Victoria
- Died: 1 August 1939 (aged 62); Ballarat, Victoria
- Original team: Ballarat

Playing career^{1}
Years	Club	Games (Goals)
1900	South Melbourne	2 (1)
- ^{1} Playing statistics correct to the end of 1900.

Martin Stirling Gullan (5 October 1876 – 1 August 1939) was an Australian rules footballer who played with South Melbourne in the Victorian Football League (VFL).
