= Ted Greeves =

Australian rules footballer

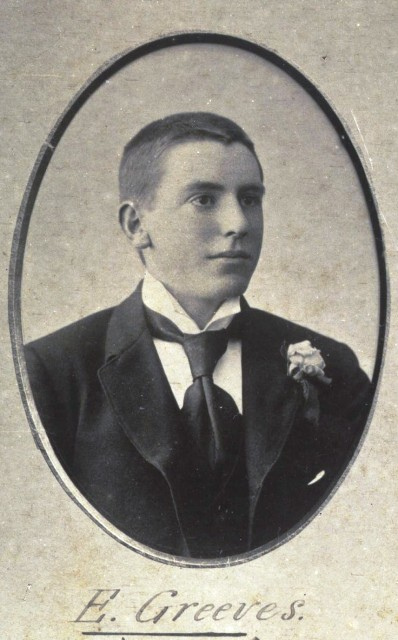

Personal information
- Full name: Edward Goderich Greeves
- Born: 16 December 1878; Skipton, Victoria
- Died: 11 August 1935 (aged 56); Geelong, Victoria
- Original team: Geelong College

Playing career^{1}
Years	Club	Games (Goals)
1897–1899	Geelong	20 (2)
- ^{1} Playing statistics correct to the end of 1899.

Edward Goderich Greeves (16 December 1878 – 11 August 1935) was an Australian rules footballer who played with Geelong in the Victorian Football League (VFL).

== Early years ==
Greeves, the son of Edward Goderich and Julia Anderson, was born in Skipton, Victoria, on 16 December 1878.

He was a noted sportsman at Geelong College, which he joined in 1890, captain of the football team, and winner of the College Cup in 1897.

== VFL career ==
Greeves debuted for Geelong in the 1897 VFL finals series, a round-robin competition between the league's top four ranked sides. Geelong, which had lost their first fixture to Essendon, called up the 18-year-old Geelong College captain for their second game of the series, against Melbourne at Brunswick Street Oval. Playing as a backman, Greeves was reported to have done well in his role, with the Geelong side securing a nine-point win to remain in the race for the premiership. He kept his spot in the team for the third and final round of the series, in which Geelong defeated Collingwood at East Melbourne, a win that was only enough to secure the runners-up position for Geelong, as Essendon had remained unbeaten.

In the 1898 season, Greeves got his first opportunity in round five against Fitzroy and was described by the Geelong Advertiser as having played a "dashing game" as a rover, but he wouldn't reappear for two months. He played three games for Geelong late in the season, including a best-on-ground performance in a win over Melbourne, which he played as a centreman.

With his Geelong College commitments over, Greeves was a regular in the Geelong team in 1899, his final season. He made a total of 14 appearances, the last a record-setting margin over St Kilda, 162 points to 1, which would last for 20 years.

== Later life ==
Greeves married Frances Adaline Nasmith on 28 January 1903, at Scots Church, Collins Street, Melbourne. The couple lived in Warragul.

Their eldest son, Edward Jr, was born later that year. He won the inaugural Brownlow Medal in 1924 and became a Geelong Legend and Australian Football Hall of Famer.

On 11 August 1935, Greeves died in Geelong at the age of 56.
