= Robert Stanlake =

Australian rules footballer

Personal information
- Full name: Robert John Stanlake
- Born: 17 March 1883; Ballarat, Victoria
- Died: 15 June 1972 (aged 89); Hawthorn, Victoria
- Original team: Geelong College

Playing career^{1}
Years	Club	Games (Goals)
1900	Geelong	1 (0)
- ^{1} Playing statistics correct to the end of 1900.

Robert John Stanlake (17 March 1883 – 15 June 1972) was an Australian rules footballer who played with Geelong in the Victorian Football League (VFL).
