= Tommy Buchan =

Australian rules footballer

Personal information
- Full name: Thomas Johnston Buchan
- Born: 27 October 1874; Prahran, Victoria
- Died: 29 May 1962 (aged 87); Newtown, Victoria
- Original team: Newtown (Church Union)

Playing career^{1}
Years	Club	Games (Goals)
1899–1902	Geelong	41 (20)
- ^{1} Playing statistics correct to the end of 1902.

Thomas Johnston Buchan (27 October 1874 – 29 May 1962) was an Australian rules footballer who played with Geelong in the Victorian Football League (VFL).
