= James Horman =

Australian rules footballer

Personal information
- Full name: James Horman
- Born: 9 November 1877; Geelong, Victoria
- Died: 20 May 1960 (aged 82); Geelong, Victoria
- Original team: Barwon

Playing career^{1}
Years	Club	Games (Goals)
1900–02	Geelong	31 (2)
- ^{1} Playing statistics correct to the end of 1902.

James Horman (9 November 1877 – 20 May 1960) was an Australian rules footballer who played with Geelong in the Victorian Football League (VFL).

== Family ==
The son of William Robert Horman (1850-1921), and Hannah Horman (1847-1921), née Cameron, James Horman was born in Geelong on 9 November 1877.

His younger brother, George Horman (1883—1952), also played for both Chiwell and Geelong.

He married Minnie Maria Brame (1870-1909) in 1902. They had two sons: Hector Cyril Horman (1903-), and Roy Victor Horman (1907-1968).

== Football ==
=== Geelong (VFL) ===
Having made his debut, against Carlton, at Princes Park, on 5 May 1900, he played in all of the fourteen home-and-away matches, and in the first of the three round-robin finals in 1900; and, again, in 1901, he played in all of the fourteen home-and-away matches, and in the first of the three round-robin finals.

His thirty-first (and last) game for the Geelong First XVIII was against Carlton, at Princes Park, on 3 May 1902.

=== Ballarat (BFA) ===
Horman was cleared from Geelong to the Ballarat Football Club in the Ballarat Football Association (BFA) in May 1902.

=== Chilwell (GDFA) ===
In 1903, Horman was playing for the Chilwell Football Club in the Geelong District Football Association (GDFA). He was one of Chilwell's best players in the team that won the 1903 Grand Final.

== Death ==
He died in Geelong on 20 May 1960.
