= Bill de Gruchy (footballer) =

Australian rules footballer (1877–1958)

Bill De Gruchy

Personal information
- Full name: William John De Gruchy
- Born: 30 June 1877; Fitzroy, Victoria
- Died: 29 May 1958 (aged 80); Caulfield, Victoria
- Original team: Newtown

Playing career^{1}
Years	Club	Games (Goals)
1900	Geelong	1 (0)
- ^{1} Playing statistics correct to the end of 1900.

Bill De Gruchy (30 June 1877 – 29 May 1958) was an Australian rules footballer who played with Geelong in the Victorian Football League (VFL).

His youngest brother, Harold de Gruchy, played one First XVIII match for Melbourne in 1901.
