= Ted Holland =

Australian rules footballer

Personal information
- Full name: Edward Holland
- Born: 17 November 1879; Marong, Victoria
- Died: 20 September 1960 (aged 80); Bendigo, Victoria
- Position: Wing

Playing career^{1}
| Years | Club | Games (Goals) |
| 1900–02 | Geelong | 31 (4) |
- ^{1} Playing statistics correct to the end of 1902.

Edward Holland (17 November 1879 – 20 September 1960) was an Australian rules footballer who played with Geelong in the Victorian Football League (VFL).
