= Bert Barling =

Australian rules footballer

Personal information
- Full name: Albert William Barling
- Born: 24 January 1878; Geelong, Victoria
- Died: 2 December 1952 (aged 74); Geelong, Victoria
- Original team: Chilwell

Playing career^{1}
| Years | Club | Games (Goals) |
| 1897–1898 | Geelong | 17 (4) |
- ^{1} Playing statistics correct to the end of 1898.

Albert William Barling (24 January 1878 – 2 December 1952) was an Australian rules footballer who played for the Geelong Football Club in the Victorian Football League (VFL).
