= Pat O'Donnell (Australian footballer) =

Australian rules footballer (1876–1915)

Personal information
- Full name: Patrick James O'Donnell
- Born: 25 November 1876; Warrnambool, Victoria
- Died: 10 October 1915 (aged 38); Geelong, Victoria

Playing career^{1}
Years	Club	Games (Goals)
1899	Geelong	1 (0)
- ^{1} Playing statistics correct to the end of 1899.

Patrick James O'Donnell (25 November 1876 – 10 October 1915) was an Australian rules footballer who played with Geelong in the Victorian Football League (VFL). He died from pneumonia aged 38.
