= Hughie Webb =

Australian rules footballer

Personal information
- Full name: Hugh George Webb
- Born: 14 November 1878; Hay, New South Wales
- Died: 14 September 1958 (aged 79); Terang, Victoria

Playing career^{1}
Years	Club	Games (Goals)
1900, 1902–03	Geelong	22 (4)
- ^{1} Playing statistics correct to the end of 1903.

Hugh George Webb (14 November 1878 – 14 September 1958) was an Australian rules footballer who played with Geelong in the Victorian Football League (VFL).
