= Joe Powell (Australian footballer) =

Australian rules footballer

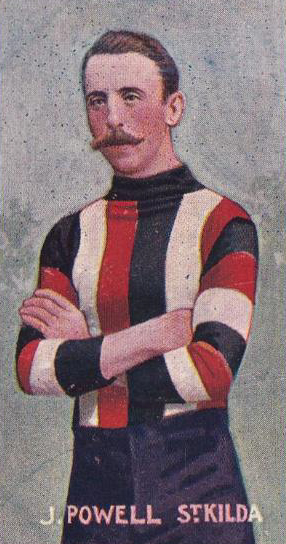
- Cigarette card of Powell in 1906

Personal information
- Full name: Joseph Powell
- Born: 30 June 1868; Ballarat East, Victoria
- Died: 21 January 1945 (aged 76); Ascot Vale, Victoria

Playing career^{1}
Years	Club	Games (Goals)
1900–01	Geelong	17 (0)
1903–05	St Kilda	28 (0)
Total		45 (0)
- ^{1} Playing statistics correct to the end of 1905.

Joe Powell (30 June 1868 – 21 January 1945) was an Australian rules footballer who played with Geelong and St Kilda in the Victorian Football League (VFL).
