= Billy Pincott =

Australian rules footballer

Personal information
- Full name: William Harwood Pincott
- Born: 24 July 1875; Geelong
- Died: 3 March 1955 (aged 79); Newtown, Victoria

Playing career^{1}
Years	Club	Games (Goals)
1897, 1899	Geelong	17 (0)
- ^{1} Playing statistics correct to the end of 1899.

William Harwood Pincott (24 July 1875 – 3 March 1955) was an Australian rules footballer who played with Geelong in the Victorian Football League (VFL).
