= Jimmy Palmer (footballer) =

Australian rules footballer

Personal information
- Full name: James Ernest Palmer
- Born: 19 December 1877; Geelong, Victoria
- Died: 3 February 1947 (aged 69); Sunbury, Victoria
- Original team: Newtown
- Position: Wing

Playing career^{1}
Years	Club	Games (Goals)
1897, 1899–1902	Geelong	53 (8)
- ^{1} Playing statistics correct to the end of 1902.

James Ernest Palmer (19 December 1877 – 3 February 1947) was an Australian rules footballer who played with Geelong in the Victorian Football League (VFL).

== Family ==
The son of John Charles Palmer (1852–1945), and Elizabeth Levesque Palmer (1855–1901), née Dickson, James Ernest Palmer was born on 19 December 1877.

== Death ==
He died on 3 February 1947.
