= Alf Dear =

Australian rules footballer (1878–1906)

Personal information
- Full name: Alfred Ernest Dear
- Born: 30 September 1878; Batesford, Victoria
- Died: 29 August 1906 (aged 27); Hawthorn, Victoria
- Original team: Newtown

Playing career^{1}
Years	Club	Games (Goals)
1898–1899	Geelong	22 (3)
1900	Essendon	6 (1)
Total		28 (4)
- ^{1} Playing statistics correct to the end of 1900.

Alfred Ernest Dear (30 September 1878 – 29 August 1906) was an Australian rules footballer who played for the Geelong Football Club and Essendon Football Club in the Victorian Football League (VFL).

== Family ==
The son of John Dear (1846-1897), and Mary Dear, née Connolly, Alfred Ernest Dear was born on 30 September 1878. He died on 29 August 1906. His younger brother, Joseph Henry Dear, drowned in 1907, aged 12 years.

Collingwood full-forward Peter McKenna was his grand nephew.

== Education ==
He was educated at Geelong College.

== Football ==
=== Geelong (VFL) ===
He played 22 games for Geelong over two seasons.

=== Essendon (VFL) ===
Granted a transfer from Geelong to Essendon on 16 May 1900, he first played for Essendon in the round 5 match against Carlton on 26 May 1900.

In all, he played 6 games for Essendon.

In his last match, the round 10 match against Fitzroy at the Brunswick Street Oval on 7 July 1900, he was kicked in the chest in the third quarter of the match.

He never played again: "Alf Dear remained invalided from the injuries sustained in that game against Fitzroy and in 1906 he died at home in the darkened room he rarely left, his older brother Patrick by his side."
