= Jack Conway (footballer) =

Australian rules footballer (1867–1949)

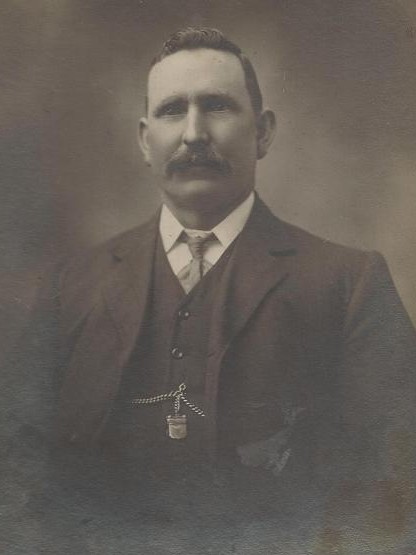

Personal information
- Full name: John Joseph Conway
- Born: 26 March 1867; Ashby, Victoria
- Died: 22 October 1949 (aged 82); Geelong, Victoria
- Position: Key position player

Playing career^{1}
| Years | Club | Games (Goals) |
| 1897–1899 | Geelong | 51 (0) |
- ^{1} Playing statistics correct to the end of 1899.

John Joseph Conway (26 March 1867 – 22 October 1949) was an Australian rules footballer who played for the Geelong Football Club in the Victorian Football League (VFL).

== Family ==
Jack married Mary Catherine Doherty and had five children from 1899 to 1915.

== Football ==
Conway was Geelong's first captain in the VFL, captaining the club for its first three seasons in the new competition before retiring at the end of the 1899 season. He is also notable for being in the inaugural team for Geelong in the VFL, and is credited with being the first player selected for a Geelong team.

== See also ==
- The Footballers' Alphabet
