= Teddy Holligan =

Australian rules footballer

Personal information
- Full name: Edward Charles Holligan
- Born: 26 March 1878; Geelong, Victoria
- Died: 22 November 1964 (aged 86); Malvern East, Victoria
- Original team: Geelong Artillery
- Position: Half forward

Playing career^{1}
Years	Club	Games (Goals)
1897–1901, 1903	Geelong	84 (29)
- ^{1} Playing statistics correct to the end of 1903.

Edward Charles Holligan (26 March 1878 – 22 November 1964) was an Australian rules footballer who played with Geelong in the Victorian Football League (VFL).

In August 1899, Holligan played football with the Horsham while living in the area.
