= Paddy Leahy (footballer) =

Australian rules footballer

Personal information
- Full name: Patrick Leahy
- Born: 16 May 1874; Murchison, Victoria
- Died: 6 May 1955 (aged 80); East Brunswick, Victoria
- Original team: Geelong VFA

Playing career^{1}
Years	Club	Games (Goals)
1897–1900	Geelong	17 (0)
1902	Carlton	4 (0)
Total		21 (0)
- ^{1} Playing statistics correct to the end of 1902.

Paddy Leahy (16 May 1874 – 6 May 1955) was an Australian rules footballer who played with Geelong and Carlton in the Victorian Football League (VFL).
