= Archie Thompson (Australian rules footballer) =

Australian rules footballer

Personal information
- Full name: Archibald Thompson
- Born: 5 August 1875; Batesford, Victoria
- Died: 10 March 1950 (aged 74); Glenthompson, Victoria
- Original team: Newtown
- Position: Utility

Playing career^{1}
Years	Club	Games (Goals)
1897–1901	Geelong	61 (14)
- ^{1} Playing statistics correct to the end of 1901.

Archibald Thompson (5 August 1875 – 10 March 1950) was an Australian rules footballer who played for the Geelong Football Club in the Victorian Football League (VFL).
