= Arthur Pincott =

Australian rules footballer

Personal information
- Full name: Arthur Henry Pincott
- Born: 3 March 1877; Geelong
- Died: 23 June 1935 (aged 58); Jindivick
- Original team: Newtown
- Position: Defence

Playing career^{1}
Years	Club	Games (Goals)
1897–1900, 1902–1903	Geelong	72 (0)
- ^{1} Playing statistics correct to the end of 1903.

Arthur Pincott (3 March 1877 – 23 June 1935) was an Australian rules footballer who played for the Geelong Football Club in the Victorian Football League (VFL). Originally from Geelong & District Football League (GDFL) club Newtown, Pincott made his VFL debut in 1897, the league's first season, and played 72 matches, for no goals by the end of the 1903 VFL season.

Pincott died aged 58 in Jindivick, Victoria.
