= Corio Oval =

Australian rules football ground in Victoria

Coordinates: 38°09′04.81″S 144°23′01.92″E

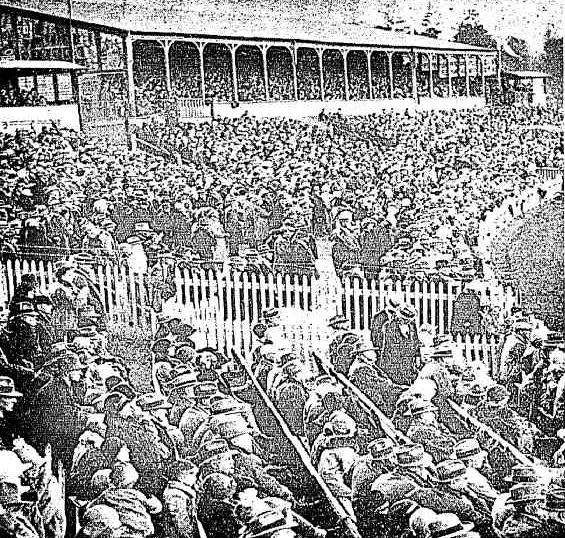
- Grandstand and members' reserve, 1929
- Interactive map of Corio Oval
- Former names: Eastern Park
- Location: East Geelong, Victoria
- Surface: Grass
- Record attendance: 26,025 (29 August 1925 Geelong v Collingwood)

Construction
- Opened: 1862
- Closed: 1970s
- Demolished: 1981

Tenants
- Geelong Football Club (VFA, VFL/AFL) (1878–1940); Geelong Trotting Club (1956–1978); Geelong Greyhound Racing Club (1956–1980)

Corio Oval was an Australian rules football ground, located in Geelong, Victoria, and used by the Geelong Football Club in the VFA and the VFL from 1878 to 1915, and 1917 to 1940. Sited in Eastern Park, the oval was served by trams from 1930 when the line was extended along Ryrie Street to the football ground.

Corio Oval had been in use as a cricket oval since 1862, when a Geelong and District XXII played an All-England XI. Several more cricket matches against international touring teams were played at the ground until 1937.

In 1878, Corio Oval became the home ground of the Geelong Football Club, after they left Argyle Square due to a dispute over rent, although one game was played at the old ground in 1878 when Corio Oval was flooded. While Geelong went into recess in 1916 due to the First World War, the club remained at Corio Oval until the end of the 1940 season, when they were forced to relocate after the venue became the first major VFL ground to be used by the Army as a Military Training Camp during World War II. Kardinia Park was decided upon as a temporary replacement, with the Corio Oval ticket boxes and turnstiles being relocated to the new venue for the start of the 1941 season. Due to travel restrictions, petrol rationing, and an exodus of players to serve in the armed forces, the club went into recess in 1942 and 1943: at the start of the 1944 season, there was much debate over whether to return to Corio Oval, but the supporters of Kardinia Park won out.

After the departure of the military, Corio Oval was vacant until 1956, when the Geelong Trotting Club held its inaugural meeting there. In the same year, the Geelong Greyhound Racing Club began to use a new track constructed for greyhound racing inside the trotting circuit, employing a mechanical "tin hare" as the lure.

In 1978, plans were announced for the new Australian Animal Health Laboratory to be built near Eastern Park. Because the new facility was designed to deal with highly infectious diseases, large congregations of animals could not be permitted in the vicinity: the greyhound and trotting clubs left Corio Oval and moved to a newly constructed complex at Beckley Park, adjacent to the Princes Highway in Corio.

In 1981, the oval finally ceased to exist when the surviving main grandstand was demolished, and a conference centre, now owned by the Salvation Army, was constructed on the site.

The attendance record for Corio Oval was set on 29 August 1925, when 26,025 fans saw Geelong defeat Collingwood by nine points, a record for a Geelong home match that was not broken until 1951. A total of 545 matches at the top level of Victorian senior football – 174 in the VFA and 371 in the VFL – were played at the ground in 62 seasons of competition.
