= List of St Kilda Football Club players =

This is a list of St Kilda Football Club players who have made one or more appearances in the Australian Football League (AFL), known as the Victorian Football League (VFL) until 1990, or the AFL Women's. St Kilda were one of the foundation clubs for the inaugural VFL season in 1897, and entered the AFL Women's competition in its fourth season in 2020.

== VFL/AFL players ==
Key
Order	Players are listed in order of debut
Seasons	Includes St Kilda only careers and spans from the season of the player's debut to the year in which they played their final game for the St Kilda
Debut	Debuts are for VFL/AFL regular season and finals series matches only
Games	Statistics are for VFL/AFL regular season and finals series matches only and are correct to the end of 2025.
Goals	Statistics are for VFL/AFL regular season and finals series matches only and are correct to the end of 2025.
^	Currently listed players

=== 1890s ===
Debut Year	Player	Games	Goals	Years at Club
1897	Bill Ahern	12	6	1897
1897	Harry Aylwin	29	0	1897–1899
1897	Alf Bedford	1	0	1897
1897	Billy Beggs	13	0	1897–1898
1897	Danny Dunne	13	4	1897
1897	Ernie Dunne	13	4	1897–1898
1897	Harry Gower	2	0	1897
1897	Ted Hall	73	10	1897–1902
1897	Algy Hay	10	1	1897
1897	Ernest Jones	12	1	1897–1898
1897	Arch Lowe	6	1	1897–1898
1897	Bill Matthews	80	7	1897–1902
1897	Tom McNamara	83	1	1897–1899, 1901–1904
1897	Bill Newton	3	0	1897
1897	Joe O'Grady	9	0	1897
1897	Syd Phillips	25	0	1897–1898
1897	Billy Shaw	29	1	1897–1899
1897	Ernie Stewart	11	0	1897
1897	Reg Stewart	15	7	1897–1898
1897	Bill Turner	10	1	1897
1897	Mick Blake	30	5	1897–1899
1897	Dan Collins	7	0	1897–1898
1897	Jack Jennings	13	1	1897–1898
1897	John Molesworth	1	0	1897
1897	Joe Hogan	91	11	1897–1900, 1902–1906
1897	Jerry McGrath	21	0	1897, 1900, 1902–1903
1897	George McLeod	21	5	1897, 1901–1903
1897	Fred Whitelaw	30	4	1897–1899
1897	Charlie Howell	10	0	1897–1898
1897	Fred Stewart	6	0	1897
1897	George Blake	7	0	1897–1898, 1903
1897	Harry Duigan	8	1	1897–1898
1897	Charlie Cox	2	0	1897
1897	George Morrison	6	0	1897, 1899
1897	John Grieve	1	0	1897
1897	George Rutherford	23	0	1897–1900
1897	Mick O'Hagan	1	0	1897
1897	Emery Staines	1	0	1897
1897	Matt Conniff	1	0	1897
1897	Archibald Middleton	1	0	1897
1897	Gillie Wilson	2	1	1897, 1900
1898	Artie Archer	5	0	1898
1898	Peter Brady	8	3	1898–1899
1898	Mark Cumming	4	0	1898
1898	David Gaunson	1	0	1898
1898	Edmund Kirwin	1	0	1898
1898	Horrie Lyons	5	1	1898
1898	Jim Morehouse	10	0	1898
1898	Arthur Richardson	3	0	1898
1898	Howard Smith	95	6	1898–1904
1898	Tom Blake	24	4	1898–1900
1898	Walter Stewart	10	1	1898, 1900
1898	Harry Barr	1	0	1898
1898	Johnny Dando	23	0	1898–1899, 1901
1898	Dave Gibson	10	0	1898
1898	Andy Stewart	49	47	1898–1901
1898	George Stewart	29	3	1898–1900
1898	Bert Kay	1	0	1898
1898	Edgar Maddox	1	0	1898
1898	Don Walker	1	0	1898
1898	Harold Brookes	2	2	1898
1898	Percy Damman	7	0	1898
1898	Tom Fogarty	10	0	1898
1898	Bill Woodhouse	7	2	1898
1898	Jim Warne	10	1	1898–1899
1898	George Morgan	16	1	1898, 1902–1903
1898	Harry Thompson	1	0	1898
1898	Alf Clauscen	2	0	1898
1898	Ralph Hatch	1	0	1898
1898	George Hunter	1	0	1898
1898	Alf Smith	1	0	1898
1898	George May	10	1	1898–1899
1898	Billy Porter	3	0	1898
1898	Alf Parker	1	0	1898
1898	Herb Louch	1	0	1898
1898	Jack Purse	1	0	1898
1898	Jack Todd	1	0	1898
1899	Bob Kenny	2	0	1899
1899	Mal Markellie	21	8	1899, 1902–1903
1899	Billy McGregor	28	2	1899–1900
1899	Michael O'Gorman	18	6	1899–1900
1899	Jack Ryan	1	0	1899
1899	Jimmy Smith	130	22	1899–1906, 1908–1909
1899	George Spilcker	22	1	1899–1901
1899	Gerry Williams	11	4	1899–1900
1899	Dick McCabe	73	4	1899–1903
1899	Charles Raff	5	0	1899
1899	George Sparrow	11	0	1899
1899	Harry Bond	2	0	1899
1899	Harold Brown	14	0	1899–1900
1899	Bill Blackwood	10	2	1899
1899	Dick Robertson	1	0	1899
1899	Jim Park	9	0	1899
1899	Michael Dalton	1	0	1899
1899	Jim Farnan	1	0	1899
1899	Gus Hefter	2	0	1899
1899	Ernie Glenister	7	0	1899
1899	Andy Allan	4	0	1899
1899	Ernie Greeves	2	1	1899
1899	Jack White	6	1	1899–1900
1899	Herb Kennedy	1	0	1899
1899	Jim Opie	1	0	1899
1899	Ralph Robertson	14	1	1899–1900
1899	Alec Wallace	2	0	1899
1899	Bill Wishart	2	1	1899
1899	Alex Young	1	0	1899
1899	Wal Heron	1	0	1899

=== 1900s ===
Debut Year	Player	Games	Goals	Years at Club
1900	Gordon Allard	16	7	1900
1900	Claude Clough	23	8	1900–1901
1900	Tim Curran	10	1	1900
1900	Arch Muirhead	33	1	1900–1901
1900	Bill O'Hara	13	3	1900
1900	Arthur Pearce	27	6	1900–1901
1900	Cecil Sandford	43	12	1900–1902, 1904
1900	George Sutherland	16	14	1900–1901
1900	Dave Strickland	1	0	1900
1900	Fred Warry	2	0	1900
1900	Bill Harris	2	0	1900
1900	Arthur Scott	14	4	1900–1901
1900	Charlie Clarke	17	5	1900–1902
1900	Bob Campbell	1	0	1900
1900	Val Robertson	59	0	1900–1904
1900	Roy Wawn	2	1	1900
1900	Henry Jackson	1	0	1900
1900	Harold Stewart	1	0	1900
1901	Harry Dowdall	1	0	1901
1901	Cec Graeme	7	0	1901
1901	Harry Luck	8	0	1901
1901	Bob Rinder	3	0	1901
1901	Gus Robertson	18	1	1901–1902
1901	George Sandford	11	0	1901–1902
1901	Bill Anderson	1	0	1901
1901	Ben Sandford	31	5	1901–1903
1901	Charlie Mullany	16	3	1901–1902
1901	Tim Murphy	1	0	1901
1901	Bill Nash	1	0	1901
1901	Mick O'Loughlin	9	0	1901
1901	Tom Robertson	27	7	1901–1902
1901	George Carpenter	3	1	1901–1902
1901	Bert Robertson	2	1	1901
1901	Ern Aurish	1	0	1901
1901	Lawrie Delaney	2	2	1901
1901	Paddy McGuinness	1	0	1901
1901	Tommy Carr	5	0	1901
1901	Henry Pinniger	12	0	1901–1902
1901	John Crennan	4	3	1901
1901	Reg Wilks	2	0	1901
1901	Roy Adam	2	0	1901
1901	Arthur Brennan	1	0	1901
1901	Herb Clements	1	1	1901
1901	Sam Gray	1	0	1901
1902	Charlie Baker	76	122	1902–1906
1902	Mick English	15	1	1902
1902	Bill Jennings	2	0	1902
1902	Jack O'Loughlin	3	1	1902
1902	Alf Trevillian	44	12	1902–1903, 1906
1902	Bill Pickering	6	1	1902
1902	Horrie Trinder	10	2	1902–1903
1902	Ernest Nicholls	1	0	1902
1902	Alex Sinclair	3	0	1902
1902	Bill Ockleshaw	1	0	1902
1902	Gerry Balme	91	2	1902–1906, 1915
1902	Walter Clarke	1	0	1902
1902	Herb Brunning	1	0	1902
1902	Bill Kennedy	1	0	1902
1902	Claude Stanlake	18	4	1902–1903
1902	Robert O'Neill	1	0	1902
1902	Jim Cowell	92	27	1902–1908
1902	Tom Crowe	3	0	1902
1902	Bob Molesworth	2	0	1902
1902	Peter McCracken	1	1	1902
1903	Vic Cumberland	126	72	1903–1904, 1907–1908, 1912–1915, 1920
1903	Jack Dowding	42	30	1903–1905
1903	George Hall	4	2	1903
1903	Bill Jackson	6	3	1903
1903	Martin O'Brien	3	0	1903
1903	Wyn Outen	54	3	1903–1905, 1907
1903	George Rickards	33	2	1903–1905
1903	Arthur Britt	3	0	1903
1903	Herb Hudson	2	0	1903
1903	Joe Powell	28	0	1903–1905
1903	Ernie Pye	2	0	1903
1903	Vic Barwick	105	66	1903–1909, 1913
1903	Fred Nixon	22	21	1903–1904
1903	Frank Harris	25	5	1903–1905
1903	Sam Gravenall	30	15	1903, 1906, 1910
1903	Bart Dinsmore	2	3	1903
1904	Dan Feehan	85	9	1904–1910
1904	Jim Marshall	1	0	1904
1904	Tommy Ryan	11	8	1904
1904	David Starke	1	0	1904
1904	Bill Mahoney	17	9	1904–1905
1904	Fred Whelpton	2	0	1904
1904	John Moloney	3	0	1904
1904	Jim King	13	2	1904–1905
1904	Jack King	8	0	1904
1904	Wally Scott	108	4	1904–1911
1904	Jim Hallahan	2	1	1904
1904	Des Griffin	1	0	1904
1904	Dan Scullion	1	0	1904
1904	Frank Kenny	2	0	1904
1904	Alec Moffatt	3	0	1904
1904	Ivor Evans	1	0	1904
1904	Gordon Downes	1	0	1904
1904	Lewis Jones	1	0	1904
1904	Jack Julian	67	0	1904–1908
1904	Joe Marchant	1	0	1904
1904	Jimmy Sheehan	1	2	1904
1905	Bill Cowell	9	4	1905
1905	Frank Dunne	1	1	1905
1905	Stewart Geddes	10	2	1905
1905	Alby Herman	1	0	1905
1905	Barney McGarry	1	0	1905
1905	Jim Stewart	83	77	1905–1910
1905	Gordon Dangerfield	159	16	1905, 1907–1915, 1918–1919
1905	Bill Johnson	6	0	1905
1905	Jack McCarthy	11	0	1905
1905	Hugh Crichton	1	0	1905
1905	Percy Ellin	70	19	1905–1910
1905	Ivor Lawson	30	1	1905–1907
1905	Glyn Thomas	2	1	1905
1905	Joe Wearmouth	2	0	1905
1905	Jack Hannagan	1	0	1905
1905	Ossie O'Connell	8	1	1905–1906
1905	Charles Rowe	1	0	1905
1905	Frank House	3	1	1905
1905	Claude Beales	1	0	1905
1905	Frank Robertson	1	0	1905
1905	Johnny Watts	14	3	1905–1906, 1910
1905	Dave McNamara	122	187	1905–1909, 1914–1915, 1918–1919, 1921–1923
1905	Charlie Kay	1	2	1905
1905	Harry Lever	218	6	1905–1915, 1918–1919, 1921–1922
1905	Billy Stewart	46	10	1905–1909
1905	Bill Carlson	4	4	1905–1906
1906	Pat O'Connor	33	5	1906–1907
1906	Archie Pratt	2	0	1906
1906	Jim Fagan	1	2	1906
1906	Bert Field	2	0	1906
1906	Ern Williamson	5	0	1906
1906	Jack Wells	39	4	1906–1909
1906	Horrie Bant	52	1	1906–1909
1906	Harry Parsons	13	3	1906, 1908
1906	George Gardiner	2	2	1906
1906	Ted Edwards	1	0	1906
1906	Alec Hall	1	0	1906
1906	Tommy Jackson	11	0	1906–1907
1906	Len Roberts	1	0	1906
1906	Arthur Gerrard	1	0	1906
1906	Ned O'Connor	1	0	1906
1907	Charlie Clymo	43	21	1907–1909
1907	Jimmy Matthews	12	18	1907
1907	George Morrissey	93	64	1907–1910, 1912–1913
1907	Bert Renfrey	15	0	1907
1907	Horrie Brain	11	0	1907
1907	John Gilding	1	0	1907
1907	Chris Bant	27	2	1907–1908
1907	Frank Brown	1	0	1907
1907	Horrie Farmer	3	0	1907–1908
1907	Dan O'Brien	2	0	1907
1907	Arthur Miles	1	0	1907
1907	Billy Williams	7	4	1907
1907	Ted Fisher	1	0	1907
1908	Mick Grace	16	26	1908
1908	Bismarck Kulpa	2	0	1908
1908	Alby Landt	4	0	1908
1908	Bill Madden	26	14	1908–1909
1908	Bill Woodcock	155	48	1908–1914, 1918–1921
1908	Bob Cromie	1	0	1908
1908	Jack Grant	1	0	1908
1908	Leo Duff	2	1	1908
1908	Ernie Abbott	1	1	1908
1908	Harry Hall	2	0	1908
1908	Doug Hill	1	1	1908
1908	Hector Mitchell	1	0	1908
1908	Bob Northey	2	1	1908
1908	Bert O'Connell	2	0	1908
1908	Wally Gant	49	6	1908–1911, 1914
1908	Joe Prince	2	1	1908–1909
1909	Arthur Caldwell	8	1	1909
1909	George McCart	2	0	1909–1910
1909	Bert Richardson	1	0	1909
1909	Bill Young	2	2	1909
1909	Jack Brown	11	4	1909–1910
1909	Harry Clarke	4	2	1909
1909	Angus Fregon	1	0	1909
1909	Jim Jackson	1	0	1909
1909	Les McDonald	17	0	1909
1909	Horrie Pearce	5	2	1909
1909	Joe Ritchie	7	3	1909
1909	Owen Murtagh	1	0	1909
1909	Bert Pierce	64	10	1909–1913
1909	Jeff Riley	1	0	1909
1909	Gower Ross	8	2	1909
1909	Billy Egan	8	0	1909
1909	Ted Alcorn	2	0	1909
1909	Artie Pattinson	4	4	1909
1909	Bobby Rowe	12	1	1909–1910
1909	Jim Stewart	3	1	1909, 1911
1909	Jim Crow	4	1	1909–1910
1909	Dick Campbell	1	0	1909
1909	Vernon Hazel	3	0	1909–1910
1909	Alby Hosking	4	0	1909
1909	Arthur Cobain	1	0	1909
1909	Keith Heron	1	0	1909
1909	Joe Moroney	2	1	1909
1909	Ken Edgar	9	0	1909–1910
1909	Wels Eicke	197	61	1909–1915, 1918–1924, 1926
1909	Arnie Wilson	2	0	1909–1910
1909	Syd Bradley	1	1	1909
1909	Harry Matheson	7	4	1909–1910
1909	Vern Banbury	3	1	1909–1910
1909	Norm Bland	1	0	1909
1909	Harold Egan	1	0	1909
1909	Frank Griffin	2	0	1909–1910
1909	Ken McKenzie	14	7	1909–1911

=== 1910s ===
Debut Year	Player	Games	Goals	Years at Club
1910	Ernest Cazaly	2	0	1910, 1919
1910	Herb Friend	1	0	1910
1910	Stan Sheehan	5	1	1910
1910	Artie Thomas	53	29	1910–1913
1910	Frank Turner	1	0	1910
1910	Russ Watson	2	1	1910
1910	Frank Williams	5	0	1910
1910	Eddie O'Brien	2	0	1910
1910	Matt Outen	27	7	1910–1911
1910	Tommy Lamprell	1	2	1910
1910	John Nilen	1	0	1910
1910	Wally Roach	6	0	1910
1910	Ted Smith	1	0	1910
1910	Emmett Ryan	21	0	1910–1911
1910	Bill Tottey	12	6	1910–1911
1910	Harry Farnsworth	1	1	1910
1910	Bill Mearns	3	1	1910
1910	Hugh Plowman	26	1	1910–1912
1910	Bill Bushell	1	0	1910
1910	Alan Irwin	2	0	1910
1910	Bob Monar	12	3	1910–1911
1910	Viv Parkinson	2	1	1910
1910	George Williams	1	0	1910
1910	Herb Baker	3	2	1910
1910	Lou Holmes	1	0	1910
1910	Syd Thom	2	0	1910
1910	Les Jamieson	1	0	1910
1910	Ern Woodfield	1	0	1910
1910	Bill O'Brien	4	1	1910–1911
1910	Charles Pickerd	1	0	1910
1910	Tom Baird	10	7	1910–1911
1910	Harry Gathercole	3	3	1910–1911
1910	Harrie Hattam	84	2	1910–1915
1910	Otto Lowenstern	12	1	1910–1911
1910	Jack Walker	4	2	1910–1911
1911	Wally Graham	8	0	1911
1911	Reg Gregson	3	2	1911
1911	Percy Stainer	2	0	1911
1911	Joe Stephens	8	2	1911
1911	Sam Mortimer	1	1	1911
1911	Albert Biggs	2	0	1911
1911	Bill Patterson	11	0	1911–1912
1911	Ted Brown	4	1	1911
1911	Tom Handley	1	0	1911
1911	George O'Connor	2	0	1911
1911	Claude Hunt	2	0	1911
1911	Alex MacKenzie	10	1	1911–1912
1911	Arthur Newbound	1	1	1911
1911	Bob Briggs	7	7	1911
1911	Bill Goddard	7	0	1911
1911	Charlie Taylor	7	1	1911–1912
1911	Henry Merritt	3	0	1911
1911	Harold Parker	3	0	1911
1911	Ernie Sellars	47	119	1911–1913
1911	Bert Butler	3	0	1911
1911	Alby Bowtell	1	0	1911
1911	Roy Cazaly	99	39	1911–1915, 1918–1920
1911	Claude Crowl	3	0	1911
1911	Peter Donnelly	1	0	1911
1911	Alf Hammond	1	0	1911
1911	Otto O'Pelt	1	0	1911
1911	Rowley Smith	3	0	1911
1911	John Somer	1	0	1911
1911	Tom Soutar	1	0	1911
1911	Bill Ward	1	0	1911
1911	Brodie Ainslie	1	0	1911
1911	Henry Bray	1	0	1911
1911	Vic Gordon	3	0	1911
1911	Aubrey Hart	4	1	1911–1912
1911	Norm Ingham	2	0	1911
1911	Fred Linay	2	2	1911
1911	Henry McNamara	1	0	1911
1911	Paul White	20	5	1911–1914, 1918–1919
1911	Charles Suhr	1	0	1911
1911	Jack Whittle	1	0	1911
1911	Gordon Robinson	1	0	1911
1912	Des Baird	31	7	1912–1914
1912	Bob Cave	5	1	1912
1912	Jim Doolan	13	2	1912–1913
1912	Fred Hanson	18	0	1912–1913
1912	Dick Harris	28	3	1912–1913
1912	Percy Jory	60	15	1912–1915, 1920
1912	Percy Martyn	9	11	1912
1912	Billy Schmidt	90	77	1912–1914, 1918–1920
1912	Tom Baxter	11	7	1912
1912	Basil Nehill	13	2	1912
1912	Phil Lynch	33	24	1912–1913
1912	Billy Anderson	10	3	1912–1913
1912	Arthur Best	15	22	1912–1913
1912	Ted Burns	2	0	1912
1912	Hugh Colquhoun	2	0	1912
1912	Harold Booth	2	0	1912
1912	Gil Ebbott	2	2	1912
1913	Reg Ellis	52	1	1913–1915
1913	Jock Menzies	4	1	1913
1913	Ted Collins	78	27	1913–1915, 1918–1921
1913	Bill Hore	4	1	1913–1914
1913	Bob Bowden	66	0	1913–1915, 1918–1919
1913	William Flintoft	1	0	1913
1913	Ned Bowen	2	0	1913
1913	Algy Millhouse	10	5	1913
1913	Bill Angwin	6	1	1913–1914
1914	Bobby Donald	7	2	1914–1915
1914	Roy Farmer	8	2	1914
1914	Angus McDonald	2	1	1914
1914	Len Phillips	5	6	1914
1914	Norm Turnbull	31	14	1914, 1918–1920
1914	Bert Chapman	7	1	1914
1914	Ernie Foo	4	2	1914
1914	Stan Brady	7	5	1914
1914	Orm Fowler	9	11	1914–1915
1914	Henry Jane	10	0	1914
1914	Bill Lowrie	30	27	1914–1915, 1919–1920
1914	Algy Sharp	21	29	1914–1915
1914	Jack Watt	5	3	1914
1914	Vern Couttie	1	1	1914
1914	Harry Horsenail	6	2	1914–1915, 1918
1914	Pat Maloney	44	8	1914–1915, 1918–1920
1914	George McDonald	1	1	1914
1914	Clarrie Roberts	1	0	1914
1915	Les Boyd	42	43	1915, 1918–1919
1915	Jack James	123	114	1915, 1918–1925
1915	Harry Moyes	61	128	1915, 1919, 1921–1924
1915	Percy Jackson	7	3	1915
1915	Tommy Lang	19	0	1915, 1918–1919
1915	Harold Manson	8	0	1915
1915	Eric Richardson	3	0	1915
1915	Tom Moloughney	1	0	1915
1915	Bill Dinsmore	1	0	1915
1915	Ted James	2	0	1915
1915	Fred Harrison	1	0	1915
1915	Fred Turnbull	8	2	1915, 1918
1915	Bill Cubbins	149	42	1915, 1919–1926, 1928–1930
1915	Jim Sprigg	3	1	1915
1915	George Bastin	1	2	1915
1918	Reg Berry	26	9	1918–1919
1918	Bill Hannan	29	0	1918–1919, 1921
1918	Carlyle Kenley	18	5	1918–1919
1918	Pat Kennedy	11	3	1918, 1920–1921
1918	Roy Ostberg	22	7	1918–1919
1918	Joe Rahilly	4	2	1918
1918	Alan Sinclair	19	1	1918–1920
1918	Bert Atkins	7	1	1918–1919
1918	Arnold Buntine	4	0	1918
1918	Reg Thompson	8	4	1918–1919
1918	Edwin Hogan	2	0	1918
1918	Frank McPherson	1	0	1918
1918	Artie Dawson	20	9	1918–1919, 1921
1918	Eric Gordon	2	0	1918
1918	Doug Thomson	2	0	1918, 1920
1919	Harry Grigg	18	3	1919–1921
1919	Norm Hallett	16	9	1919–1920
1919	Jimmy Deagan	14	1	1919–1921
1919	Peter Ryan	7	3	1919
1919	Leo Corbett	1	0	1919
1919	Bobby Russell	1	0	1919
1919	Bill Talbot	6	3	1919
1919	Wally Tuck	18	1	1919, 1921
1919	Ben Hair	6	3	1919
1919	Max Hardie	2	0	1919
1919	Alwyn Davies	2	0	1919
1919	Arnold Beitzel	14	18	1919–1920
1919	Bill Osborne	6	0	1919, 1921
1919	Bill Griffiths	1	0	1919
1919	Ray Harper	35	0	1919–1923

=== 1920s ===
Debut Year	Player	Games	Goals	Years at Club
1920	Albert Bragg	7	6	1920
1920	Wally Cameron	25	23	1920–1923
1920	Rowley Griffiths	13	1	1920–1921
1920	Bill Lloyd	11	6	1920–1921
1920	Jimmy Milne	53	4	1920, 1922–1925
1920	Colin Watson	93	34	1920, 1922–1925, 1933–1935
1920	Stan Williams	32	0	1920–1922
1920	Ivor Aldridge	8	2	1920–1921
1920	Jack Hansen	8	4	1920
1920	Tom Lowrie	20	24	1920–1922
1920	Paddy Kelly	7	0	1920
1920	George Noonan	13	2	1920
1920	Ted Bulmer	2	0	1920
1920	Steve Gill	2	0	1920
1920	Gordon Munro	1	0	1920
1920	Les Carbarns	19	1	1920–1921
1920	Arthur Leech	2	1	1920
1920	Joe Campbell	2	0	1920
1920	Carl Schaefer	1	0	1920
1920	Les White	2	0	1920
1920	Bob Curtayne	23	1	1920–1921
1920	Leo Walsh	3	0	1920
1920	Hec Yeomans	5	8	1920
1920	Billy Sarll	4	2	1920
1920	Frank Gleeson	1	0	1920
1920	Ernie Vernon	3	0	1920
1920	Claude Denman	2	0	1920
1920	Maurie McLeish	1	0	1920
1920	Jim Shelton	3	0	1920–1921
1920	Steve Stevens	1	0	1920
1920	Kevin Duffy	1	0	1920
1920	Jack O'Rourke	29	21	1920–1924
1920	Frank Quinn	1	1	1920
1921	Barney Carr	130	5	1921–1929
1921	Rex De Garis	60	13	1921–1923, 1925
1921	Jim Jenkins	50	16	1921–1925
1921	Harry Kerley	20	29	1921–1922
1921	Larry Polinelli	1	1	1921
1921	Charlie Ricketts	5	1	1921
1921	Gus Howell	1	0	1921
1921	Jim Morden	33	3	1921–1923, 1925
1921	Frank Silcock	4	1	1921
1921	George Robbins	7	6	1921–1922, 1924
1921	Dave Dick	1	0	1921
1922	Cyril Gambetta	129	75	1922–1931
1922	Aubrey MacKenzie	35	8	1922–1924
1922	Bill Tymms	8	5	1922–1923
1922	Horrie Bannister	17	4	1922–1923
1922	Stan Cooper	2	0	1922
1922	Horrie Mason	137	76	1922–1931
1922	Les Morrison	8	0	1922
1922	Ed Sanneman	72	25	1922, 1925–1931
1922	Wal Gunnyon	63	21	1922–1927
1922	Bill Ward	7	4	1922–1923
1922	Bert Officer	6	10	1922–1924
1922	Les Reynolds	30	11	1922–1924
1922	Orville Lamplough	7	6	1922–1923
1923	Bert Lenne	21	0	1923–1924
1923	Tim Archer	22	12	1923–1924
1923	Gene Sullivan	6	1	1923
1923	Eric Donaldson	1	0	1923
1923	Alan Thomson	14	0	1923–1924
1923	Tom Carlyon	2	0	1923
1923	George Pennicott	1	0	1923
1923	Duncan Moodie	4	3	1923
1924	Fred Dore	8	1	1924
1924	Housie Grounds	4	7	1924
1924	Harry Tampling	6	0	1924
1924	Alby Anderson	10	7	1924
1924	John Lord	30	18	1924–1926
1924	Joe Scales	15	5	1924
1924	Clarrie Sullivan	9	0	1924–1925
1924	Arthur Cock	2	0	1924
1924	Bert Day	25	1	1924–1927
1924	Eric Peck	2	0	1924
1924	Fred Phillips	134	107	1924–1932
1924	Frank Scully	41	42	1924–1927
1924	Dave Griffiths	4	1	1924
1924	George Lucas	48	6	1924–1928
1924	Henry White	1	0	1924
1924	Les Gallagher	9	14	1924–1925
1924	Jim Illingworth	2	0	1924
1924	Alan K. Scott	19	0	1924–1926
1924	Joe Henke	1	0	1924
1925	Jack Armstrong	14	6	1925
1925	Peter Cleal	4	0	1925
1925	Albert Deagan	3	1	1925
1925	Harold Matthews	136	0	1925–1932
1925	John F. Shelton	57	152	1925–1928
1925	Roy Bence	144	83	1925–1933
1925	Jack Bidgood	1	0	1925
1925	Tom Cunningham	2	3	1925
1925	Stan Hepburn	69	14	1925–1930
1925	Tasman Roberts	41	22	1925–1927
1925	Len May	20	10	1925–1926
1925	Tommy Carswell	3	1	1925–1926
1925	Bruce Rae	7	4	1925–1926
1925	Norm Mitchell	3	3	1925
1925	Herbert Guthrie	2	1	1925
1925	Jack Shelley	2	1	1925–1926
1926	Mick Anthony	2	0	1926
1926	Vin Arthur	16	5	1926–1927
1926	Sam Newman	2	0	1926
1926	Dermot O'Brien	15	0	1926–1927
1926	Jack Palmer	4	1	1926
1926	Jack Fidler	19	2	1926–1927
1926	Albert Strange	1	0	1926
1926	Harry Kuhl	12	7	1926
1926	Alec Proudfoot	4	1	1926–1927
1926	Jack Shelton	28	4	1926, 1928–1929
1926	Luke Trainor	4	4	1926
1926	Ernie Loveless	42	2	1926–1929, 1931
1926	Harold Peacock	1	0	1926
1926	Lew Sharpe	8	1	1926–1927
1926	Roy Leaper	16	1	1926–1928
1926	Harry Lakin	6	3	1926–1927
1926	Eric Cormack	11	1	1926–1927
1926	George Dunstan	1	0	1926
1927	George Heinz	1	1	1927
1927	Jim Keddie	65	3	1927–1931
1927	Jack Forty	7	1	1927
1927	Frank Hutchesson	52	7	1927–1931
1927	George Lomer	14	8	1927–1928
1927	Clarrie Wyatt	13	0	1927–1928
1927	Jim Dalton	11	3	1927–1928
1927	Harry Brown	3	0	1927
1927	Harry Neill	84	58	1927–1933
1927	Allan Bryce	2	0	1927
1927	Syd Hayhow	9	0	1927
1927	Alec Vary	3	2	1927
1927	Allan Hutton	2	1	1927
1927	Harry Verdon	2	3	1927
1927	Con Bahen	6	7	1927, 1929
1928	Arthur Hart	34	29	1928–1929
1928	Arthur Ludlow	48	58	1928–1930, 1932
1928	Bert Smedley	19	55	1928–1929
1928	Percy Tulloh	3	2	1928
1928	Danny Warr	37	48	1928–1929
1928	Harry McPherson	1	0	1928
1928	Clem Morden	18	1	1928–1932
1928	Billy Roberts	160	6	1928–1937
1928	Maurie De Araugo	9	6	1928
1928	Percy Outram	27	50	1928–1930
1929	Bill Mohr	195	735	1929–1941
1929	Jack Mohr	4	2	1929
1929	Alan Scott	32	26	1929–1930
1929	Ted Terry	1	0	1929
1929	Ray Ross	1	0	1929
1929	Len Mills	2	3	1929
1929	Jim Taylor	2	0	1929

=== 1930s ===
Debut Year	Player	Games	Goals	Years at Club
1930	Clyde Beattie	5	2	1930
1930	Harry Comte	104	55	1930–1937
1930	Hugh Dunbar	3	1	1930
1930	Jim Forbes	19	6	1930–1932, 1934
1930	Clarrie Hindson	90	0	1930–1936
1930	Lloyd Jones	54	7	1930–1935
1930	Billy Stevens	23	9	1930–1931
1930	Jack Davis	150	31	1930–1938
1930	Jack Smith	9	8	1930–1931
1930	Pat Hartnett	66	58	1930, 1934–1937
1930	Arthur Roberts	31	10	1930–1933, 1936
1930	Keith Storey	5	0	1930
1930	Victor Lucas	1	0	1930
1930	Doug Bourne	48	2	1930–1935
1930	Jack Scanlon	67	14	1930–1936
1931	George W. Chapman	32	6	1931–1935
1931	Tom Fogarty	13	2	1931–1933
1931	Stuart King	43	14	1931–1933
1931	Jack Holden	36	1	1931–1934
1931	Hughie Price	1	0	1931
1931	George White	13	6	1931
1931	Alex Fraser	3	0	1931
1931	Geoff Neil	32	16	1931–1933
1931	Jack Anderson	42	46	1931–1933
1931	Tom Jones	1	1	1931
1931	Jock McLorinan	6	4	1931
1931	Jack George	55	3	1931–1935
1931	Jim Williamson	7	0	1931–1932
1932	Roy Hugo	8	2	1932
1932	Bob Kenna	21	25	1932–1933
1932	Charlie Whitehead	9	9	1932
1932	Reg Drew	3	0	1932
1932	Percy Kay	3	0	1932
1932	Jack Loes	4	0	1932
1932	Clem Fisher	9	4	1932
1932	Denis McKey	2	1	1932
1932	Don Stewart	4	0	1932
1932	Les Jones	3	0	1932
1932	Billy Green	6	9	1932–1933
1932	Alan Peel	4	1	1932–1933
1932	Jack Connell	5	1	1932–1933, 1935
1933	Stewart Anderson	20	21	1933–1935
1933	Col Deane	3	0	1933
1933	Bill Downie	15	2	1933
1933	Les Jago	17	0	1933–1934
1933	Jack McLeod	2	0	1933
1933	Eric Needham	1	0	1933
1933	Ted McCarthy	2	0	1933
1933	Frank Roberts	27	44	1933–1934
1933	Ron Fisher	82	71	1933–1938
1933	Matt Cave	14	3	1933–1934
1933	George L. Chapman	4	6	1933
1933	Reg Peterson	1	1	1933
1933	Colin Strang	2	3	1933
1933	George Schlitz	7	1	1933
1933	Les Evans	12	0	1933–1934
1933	George Batson	4	1	1933
1933	Bob Hammond	1	0	1933
1933	Tom Hallahan	14	3	1933–1934
1933	Charlie Bourne	2	0	1933
1933	Ken Mackie	62	55	1933–1938
1934	Harold Gainger	25	12	1934–1936
1934	Allan Hender	69	41	1934–1938
1934	Stan Lloyd	117	0	1934–1942
1934	Geoff McInnes	3	2	1934
1934	Trevor Ranson	2	0	1934
1934	Doug Rayment	100	35	1934–1940
1934	Ern Penny	29	29	1934–1935
1934	Bruce Gotz	2	1	1934
1934	Bill Paez	7	1	1934
1934	Les Hughson	41	45	1934–1936
1934	Jack Perkins	39	14	1934–1936
1934	Jack McCoy	9	0	1934–1935
1934	Jack Lake	2	0	1934
1934	Laird Smith	57	77	1934–1938
1934	Geoff Weber	1	0	1934
1935	Clarrie Curyer	104	58	1935–1941
1935	Joe Garbutt	7	0	1935
1935	Eric Little	14	1	1935
1935	Arthur Retell	8	8	1935
1935	Billy Cole	29	19	1935–1937
1935	Jack Wilkinson	1	0	1935
1935	Alby Weiss	69	94	1935–1942
1935	Tom Sutherland	18	18	1935–1938
1935	Ossie Bertram	15	17	1935–1936
1936	Don Hooper	6	1	1936–1937
1936	Sam Snell	93	21	1936–1940, 1944–1945
1936	Darrell Wilkins	2	0	1936
1936	Bernie Hayden	4	1	1936
1936	Bob Flett	15	8	1936, 1938
1936	Lou Gatti	5	3	1936–1937
1936	George Millard	7	0	1936
1936	Johnny Jennings	1	0	1936
1936	Peter Chitty	2	0	1936
1936	Charlie Guyer	1	1	1936
1936	Arthur Robertson	74	3	1936–1942
1936	Percy Cheffers	8	0	1936–1938
1937	Reg Garvin	130	33	1937–1946
1937	Jack Kelly	89	33	1937–1942, 1944
1937	Col Williamson	165	44	1937–1946
1937	Ron Wilson	58	6	1937–1940, 1945
1937	Tom Gale	3	0	1937
1937	Cliff Goldstraw	1	0	1937
1937	Bobby Thoms	6	0	1937
1937	Paul Bell	15	20	1937–1938
1937	Clem Neeson	3	0	1937
1937	Jack Showell	23	0	1937–1938
1937	Percy Bates	1	0	1937
1937	Wallace Mills	1	0	1937
1937	Joe Dell	2	2	1937
1937	Clarrie White	1	0	1937
1937	Arthur Rose	28	2	1937–1940, 1944
1938	Ansell Clarke	26	47	1938–1940
1938	Jack Lowry	53	7	1938–1946
1938	George Andrew	9	17	1938
1938	Les Maskell	15	9	1938, 1940
1938	Bill Sharp	27	6	1938–1940, 1945
1938	Roy Fountain	70	44	1938–1943, 1946–1947
1938	Len Boyd-Gerny	2	2	1938
1938	Ted Millar	2	0	1938
1938	Alec Peak	5	0	1938
1938	Alan Killigrew	78	75	1938–1941, 1943–1945
1938	Beres Reilly	2	0	1938
1938	Ken Walker	109	81	1938–1945
1938	Allan Buchanan	1	0	1938
1938	Ron Hartridge	15	11	1938–1940
1939	Clive Coles	13	21	1939
1939	Bob Fitzsimmons	12	2	1939–1941, 1943
1939	Bill Maslen	20	0	1939–1940
1939	Clarrie Vontom	86	78	1939–1945
1939	Jim Yewers	22	15	1939–1940, 1942
1939	Brendon O'Donnell	3	4	1939, 1945
1939	Roy Kline	3	0	1939
1939	Albert Sawley	11	2	1939
1939	Bill Dyer	1	0	1939
1939	Kevin O'Halloran	7	18	1939
1939	Ted Hoppen	41	6	1939–1941
1939	Lance Regnier	10	11	1939–1940
1939	Clarrie Riordan	13	0	1939–1940

=== 1940s ===
Debut Year	Player	Games	Goals	Years at Club
1940	Jack Cliff	32	8	1940–1942
1940	Keith Miller	50	42	1940–1942, 1946
1940	Norm Raines	19	17	1940–1941, 1943
1940	Bob Wilkie	117	13	1940–1942, 1945–1951
1940	Eddie Cranage	4	0	1940
1940	Terry O'Brien	13	21	1940–1941
1940	Laurie Taylor	1	0	1940
1940	Ern McIntyre	80	57	1940–1941, 1943–1948
1940	Jack Bray	17	18	1940–1941
1940	Marcus Hines	6	2	1940–1941
1940	Ron McLeod	39	35	1940–1941, 1944, 1946–1947
1940	Ron Mudge	11	1	1940–1942
1940	Jack Rogers	4	0	1940–1941
1941	Harold Bray	156	15	1941–1943, 1945–1952
1941	Bob Flegg	18	47	1941
1941	Jack Knight	24	16	1941–1942
1941	Les Meek	49	11	1941–1943, 1946–1947
1941	Bob Dawson	4	0	1941
1941	Clarrie Shields	26	5	1941–1943
1941	Stan Tormey	31	2	1941–1943
1941	Bob McLean	3	3	1941
1941	Don McGrath	11	1	1941
1941	Alby Oatway	1	1	1941
1941	Les Gray	36	5	1941–1946
1942	Bill Butler	58	0	1942–1946
1942	Eric Comerford	20	2	1942, 1945
1942	Phonse Orger	15	0	1942–1944
1942	Dudley Probyn	9	18	1942
1942	Les Rowell	21	9	1942–1945
1942	Eric Ward	1	2	1942
1942	Jack Brenchley	9	8	1942
1942	Frank Kelly	21	28	1942–1944
1942	Jack Whitehead	3	0	1942
1942	George Tanner	2	0	1942
1942	Marcel Hilsz	8	0	1942
1942	Norm Gravell	3	0	1942
1942	Les Handley	12	2	1942, 1945
1942	Sam Loxton	41	114	1942–1946
1942	Jim Matthews	6	3	1942
1942	Alf Hurley	1	0	1942
1942	Neville Way	8	7	1942
1942	Pat Cunningham	1	0	1942
1942	Jim MacBeth	19	2	1942, 1944
1942	Arthur Cairns	2	2	1942
1942	Jack Connelly	28	40	1942–1944
1942	Bill Hudson	5	6	1942
1942	George Parker	1	0	1942
1942	Harry House	2	0	1942
1943	Ken Bryant	3	0	1943
1943	Jim Hall	36	55	1943–1945
1943	Kevin Rohleder	5	0	1943
1943	Fred Burton	3	0	1943
1943	Ron Ellis	3	0	1943
1943	Vic Nankervis	7	6	1943
1943	Jack Gravell	1	0	1943
1943	Fred Taylor	9	0	1943–1944
1943	Jim Calvert	3	0	1943
1943	Barney Jorgensen	4	1	1943
1943	Don Kerley	5	0	1943–1944
1943	Jack Booth	14	2	1943–1944
1943	Bill Clark	11	9	1943–1944
1944	Ray Gracie	14	8	1944
1944	Wal Armour	33	36	1944–1946
1944	George Grainger	2	0	1944
1944	George Wilson	2	0	1944
1944	Peter Bennett	103	258	1944, 1947–1951, 1953–1954
1944	Bob Bibby	32	3	1944–1947
1944	Chris Lamborn	4	1	1944
1944	Gordon Geddes	20	0	1944–1945
1944	Ray Pearce	2	0	1944
1944	Brendon Bermingham	8	1	1944
1944	Ted Rippon	17	19	1944–1945
1944	Jack Howe	23	30	1944–1947
1944	Des Nisbet	110	6	1944, 1946–1952
1944	Bill Wells	22	2	1944–1945
1944	Les Hazelwood	1	1	1944
1944	Arch Knott	12	1	1944–1945
1944	Bernie Fyffe	2	0	1944
1944	Peter Morcom	3	4	1944
1944	Jack Indian	1	0	1944
1945	Max Rippon	41	4	1945–1947
1945	Les Burns	7	0	1945
1945	Allan Mummery	2	0	1945
1945	Stan Le Lievre	20	6	1945–1947
1945	Tom Reynolds	4	8	1945
1945	Bob McIntosh	4	0	1945–1946
1945	Stan Obst	2	0	1945
1945	Les Willis	19	2	1945–1947
1945	Kevin Kallady	13	4	1945–1946
1945	Ron Williams	7	0	1945
1945	Don Butling	5	3	1945
1945	Geoff Driver	22	22	1945–1946
1945	Sam Everon	2	0	1945
1945	Bob Aubrey	5	0	1945
1945	Charlie Harbour	7	0	1945–1946
1945	Joe Keating	4	0	1945
1945	Harold Daly	5	0	1945–1946
1945	Murray Johnstone	3	2	1945
1945	Geoff Kerr	7	2	1945, 1947
1946	Trojan Darveniza	6	1	1946
1946	Allan Hird	38	5	1946–1947
1946	Max Leslie	8	1	1946
1946	Kevin O'Donnell	49	20	1946–1949
1946	Keith Rosewarne	92	151	1946–1951
1946	Jim Ross	139	171	1946–1954
1946	Gordon Brunnen	26	0	1946–1947
1946	Bill Carmody	18	19	1946–1947
1946	Alan Stretton	16	10	1946–1947
1946	Jack Meehan	38	1	1946–1950
1946	Ken Mulhall	134	81	1946–1957
1946	Murray Dimble	17	13	1946–1947
1946	Mal McBean	55	0	1946–1949
1946	Wally Southern	4	2	1946
1946	Billy Winward	1	0	1946
1946	Joe Ashdown	1	0	1946
1946	Robert Hancock	58	49	1946–1950
1946	Des Pickett	27	4	1946–1950
1946	Keith Drinan	135	0	1946–1954, 1956–1957
1946	Alan Olle	51	1	1946–1951
1947	Les Gardner	3	0	1947
1947	Fred Green	67	9	1947–1951
1947	Jim Lundberg	7	0	1947
1947	Alf Copsey	13	0	1947–1948
1947	Bill Stamps	3	0	1947
1947	Ken Mace	12	0	1947
1947	Bruce Phillips	115	42	1947–1955
1947	Jack Drinan	20	1	1947–1948
1947	Jack Connally	4	1	1947
1947	John Curtin	2	0	1947
1947	Gordon Ramsay	13	0	1947–1949
1947	Len Millar	23	2	1947–1948
1947	Vin Hogan	3	1	1947
1947	Mark Langdon	32	5	1947–1952
1947	Tony Richardson	9	5	1947–1948
1947	Harold Schedlich	3	1	1947
1947	Tom Meehan	73	3	1947–1952
1947	Danny Murnane	6	3	1947–1948
1948	Pat Cahill	3	2	1948
1948	Jack McDonald	113	133	1948–1956
1948	Henry Myers	2	0	1948
1948	Bill Lumsden	11	0	1948–1949
1948	Bill Cameron	61	2	1948–1952
1948	Dudley Mattingly	3	0	1948
1948	John Solomon	36	21	1948–1952
1948	Alan Squire	108	29	1948–1954
1948	Alan Stevens	22	1	1948–1950
1948	Jack Coffey	89	52	1948–1952, 1957–1959
1948	Fred Pemberton	24	1	1948–1950
1948	Les Lewis	10	3	1948–1949
1948	Dean Chapman	17	1	1948–1951
1948	Laurie Carroll	11	2	1948–1949
1949	Peter Sherman	7	3	1949
1949	Greg Dean	7	1	1949–1950
1949	Allan Greenshields	58	3	1949–1954
1949	Max Mitchinson	17	8	1949–1952
1949	Ken Cockfield	26	0	1949–1953
1949	Dick Wicks	16	5	1949–1951
1949	Tim Olle	6	0	1949–1951
1949	Brian Mee	10	0	1949–1950

=== 1950s ===
Debut Year	Player	Games	Goals	Years at Club
1950	Felix Russo	14	1	1950–1951
1950	Frank Sutherland	21	10	1950–1952
1950	Max Mollar	82	5	1950–1955
1950	William Dicks	9	9	1950–1952
1950	Bruce McLennan	46	11	1950, 1952–1955
1951	Brian Woinarski	41	1	1951–1953
1951	Ken Phelan	9	9	1951
1951	Nick Bloom	27	32	1951–1952
1951	Jack Evans	16	4	1951–1952
1951	Frank Pattison	4	0	1951
1951	Cliff Riley	16	8	1951–1952
1951	Dave Bland	36	25	1951–1955
1951	Jim Fitzgerald	14	0	1951–1952
1951	Irving Davidson	26	1	1951–1954
1951	Arthur Hurst	42	10	1951–1955
1951	Tom McNeil	8	0	1951–1952
1952	Geoff Hibbins	33	5	1952–1954
1952	Ron Battams	3	1	1952
1952	James Wandin	17	3	1952–1953
1952	Bruce Lundgren	4	0	1952
1952	Ron Banfield	5	1	1952
1952	Syd Slocomb	2	0	1952
1952	Ivor Smith	13	0	1952–1954
1952	John Smith	4	2	1952
1952	Jack Toohey	6	0	1952
1952	Graham March	3	1	1952
1952	Neil Roberts	169	40	1952–1962
1952	Bob Atkinson	3	3	1952
1952	Brian Milnes	22	3	1952–1955
1952	Jack Hartigan	7	6	1952–1953
1952	Ray Houston	34	4	1952–1955
1952	Rodney Slate	1	0	1952
1952	Bob Watt	46	10	1952–1957
1953	Harold Davies	85	20	1953–1959
1953	Brian Gleeson	70	50	1953–1957
1953	Bill Linger	31	22	1953–1954
1953	Ian Pearson	9	2	1953–1954
1953	Chester Read	1	0	1953
1953	Geoff Turner	11	1	1953
1953	Allan Le Nepveu	9	1	1953
1953	Neville Linney	43	16	1953–1957
1953	Graham Minihan	77	32	1953–1959
1953	Jim Eley	4	0	1953
1953	Don Howell	29	9	1953–1955
1953	Bob Myers	8	0	1953–1954
1953	Allan Callow	32	13	1953–1956
1954	Les Foote	33	4	1954–1955
1954	Ron Fountain	10	6	1954, 1956
1954	Geoff Jones	19	12	1954–1956
1954	Col Thornton	6	3	1954
1954	Jack Cuffe	3	1	1954–1955
1954	Ron Shields	11	0	1954–1955
1954	Des Cole	8	0	1954–1955
1954	Max Hellmrich	2	1	1954
1954	Vin Sabbatucci	6	9	1954–1955
1954	Michael Giblett	17	0	1954–1956
1954	Ron Derrick	3	0	1954–1955
1954	Peter Cooper	3	0	1954–1955
1954	Bruce Cummins	1	0	1954
1955	Gerry Burton	10	0	1955
1955	Ron Byron	2	0	1955
1955	Stuart Lennie	10	12	1955
1955	Mick McLaren	4	0	1955
1955	Bill Gleeson	15	11	1955–1956
1955	Allan Jeans	77	27	1955–1959
1955	Jim Jewitt	2	1	1955
1955	John Reeves	8	1	1955
1955	Peter Allan	3	0	1955
1955	Allan Mennie	8	0	1955–1956
1955	Alan Osborne	1	0	1955
1955	Brian Gilmore	10	2	1955
1955	John Nelson	11	0	1955
1955	Jim Camm	4	0	1955
1955	Merv Dihm	8	0	1955
1955	Ian Drohan	3	0	1955
1955	Milne McCooke	13	8	1955, 1957–1958
1955	Jack Suttie	1	1	1955
1955	Max Stephenson	7	0	1955–1957
1956	Bud Annand	106	11	1956–1962
1956	Ray Barrett	10	5	1956, 1958
1956	Ivan Baumgartner	16	1	1956
1956	Jim Byrne	5	0	1956–1957
1956	Paul Dodd	57	51	1956–1958, 1960–1962
1956	Brian Molony	42	24	1956–1958
1956	Hugh Morris	4	0	1956
1956	Jack Mulrooney	36	18	1956–1958
1956	Jim Stephenson	2	1	1956
1956	Brian Walsh	131	0	1956–1964
1956	Bryan King	6	0	1956
1956	Brian McCarthy	74	13	1956–1961
1956	Bruce Murray	16	5	1956–1957
1956	Colin Bock	3	0	1956
1956	Peter Clancy	19	18	1956–1957
1956	Frank Hanrahan	17	1	1956–1958
1956	Bill Young	94	274	1956–1961
1956	Brian Muir	42	14	1956–1959
1956	John Robson	4	0	1956
1956	Bill Waldron	9	0	1956–1957
1956	Alan Dale	17	2	1956–1957
1956	Norm Thompson	5	1	1956
1956	Alex Cuthbertson	1	0	1956
1956	Graham Peck	3	1	1956
1956	Fred Cole	1	1	1956
1957	Lindsay Cooke	5	2	1957–1958
1957	Geoff Feehan	44	3	1957–1959
1957	Bryant Hocking	13	2	1957
1957	Ian Letcher	4	0	1957
1957	Lance Oswald	107	104	1957–1963
1957	Ian Gordon	1	0	1957
1957	Jim Guyatt	113	22	1957–1964
1957	Alan Morrow	163	151	1957–1966
1957	Bill Stephenson	88	139	1957–1963
1957	Ray Walton	47	1	1957–1961
1957	Eric Guy	93	0	1957–1962
1957	Jack Roberts	5	1	1957–1958
1957	Bob Kupsch	22	0	1957–1958
1957	Jim O'Brien	75	75	1957–1963
1958	John Hayes	7	0	1958
1958	Ron Taylor	4	0	1958
1958	Barry McIntyre	11	10	1958, 1960
1958	Bruce Andrew	4	1	1958
1958	Brian Bowe	14	0	1958–1959
1958	Verdun Howell	159	59	1958–1968
1958	Ian Synman	154	0	1958–1959, 1961–1969
1959	Roy Apted	44	1	1959–1963
1959	Leo Garlick	43	9	1959–1961
1959	John McMillan	65	26	1959–1964
1959	Lester Ross	10	0	1959
1959	Laurie Stephenson	15	21	1959–1960
1959	Lindsay Fox	20	3	1959–1961
1959	Phil Stephens	6	2	1959
1959	Les Gregory	3	0	1959
1959	Tom McKay	23	0	1959, 1962–1964
1959	Bill Coady	70	18	1959–1963
1959	Max Nowlan	8	1	1959, 1962
1959	Ken Kupsch	1	0	1959
1959	Terry Burgess	5	1	1959
1959	Ron Kee	2	2	1959
1959	Rodger Head	93	3	1959–1967
1959	Peter Burns	4	2	1959–1960

=== 1960s ===
Debut Year	Player	Games	Goals	Years at Club
1960	John Delanty	5	1	1960
1960	Bob Hay	17	4	1960–1961
1960	Gary Holmes	7	2	1960–1961
1960	David Prescott	13	7	1960–1961
1960	Ian Rowland	109	97	1960–1966
1960	Les Eldering	8	7	1960
1960	Kevin Roberts	106	110	1960–1963, 1965–1969
1960	Ray McHugh	61	39	1960–1965
1960	Barrie Mau	2	0	1960
1960	John Kilpatrick	2	0	1960
1961	Frank Hodgkin	32	21	1961–1962
1961	Ross Smith	234	230	1961–1972, 1975
1961	Graeme Lee	18	7	1961–1962
1962	Darrel Baldock	119	237	1962–1968
1962	Alan Osborne	11	2	1962–1963
1962	Bob Morton	42	58	1962–1965
1962	Ray Cross	57	4	1962–1967
1962	Ross Oakley	62	38	1962–1966
1962	Ike Ilsley	2	0	1962
1962	Brian McMahon	10	0	1962–1963
1962	Jim Read	76	9	1962–1967
1962	Kevin Billing	27	1	1962, 1964–1969
1963	Carl Ditterich	203	156	1963–1972, 1976–1978
1963	Bob Murray	153	14	1963, 1965–1972, 1974
1963	Ian Stewart	127	25	1963–1970
1963	Jim Wallis	39	41	1963–1965
1963	Max Reed	1	0	1963
1963	Daryl Griffiths	123	40	1963–1970
1963	Bill Gerrand	3	1	1963
1963	John Dowling	37	6	1963–1967
1964	Ian Cooper	69	31	1964–1969
1964	Tom Marinko	12	0	1964–1965
1964	Burnie Payne	15	27	1964
1964	Geoff Kerr	2	0	1964
1964	Brian Sierakowski	75	2	1964–1968
1964	Dennis Bartley	10	7	1964–1965
1964	Brian Mynott	210	75	1964–1975
1964	Geoff Grover	2	0	1964
1964	Adrian Young	1	0	1964
1964	Dave Hughes	2	0	1964
1965	Des Kennedy	56	26	1965–1970
1965	Ken Mann	13	1	1965–1966
1965	Bruce McMaster-Smith	15	7	1965
1965	John Bingley	8	1	1965–1966
1965	Ted Schwarzman	8	0	1965, 1967
1965	Barry Breen	300	308	1965–1982
1965	Kevin Neale	256	301	1965–1977
1965	Julian White	3	1	1965
1965	Allan McDonald	2	0	1965
1965	Jeff Moran	155	63	1965–1974
1965	Ken Baker	9	0	1965–1966
1966	Jack Austin	6	5	1966
1966	Allan Davis	173	308	1966–1975
1966	Pat Murphy	1	0	1966
1966	Graham Croft	1	2	1966
1966	Stephen Roberts	40	7	1966–1970
1966	Travis Payze	127	73	1966–1974
1967	John Bonney	87	79	1967–1969, 1971, 1973, 1976
1967	Geoff Cayzer	4	5	1967, 1971
1967	Derek King	11	5	1967–1969
1967	Jim O'Dea	167	7	1967–1976, 1978–1980
1967	Stuart Trott	159	69	1967–1974
1967	Ian Dyer	17	20	1967–1968
1967	Allan McMullen	5	1	1967
1967	John Manzie	117	51	1967–1968, 1970–1975
1967	Jon Lilley	49	2	1967–1971
1968	Barry Pascoe	41	35	1968–1970
1968	Bob Pascoe	36	32	1968–1970
1968	Gary Colling	265	49	1968–1981
1968	John O'Donnell	33	27	1968–1970
1968	Geoff Ward	31	18	1968–1971
1968	Neil Besanko	149	4	1968–1977
1968	Max Pitt	7	1	1968–1969
1968	Peter Rumney	5	0	1968–1969
1968	Graeme McLean	5	1	1968–1969
1968	Gary Wallis	3	4	1968
1969	Barry Lawrence	126	80	1969–1976
1969	Stephen Theodore	134	111	1969–1976
1969	John Evans	14	10	1969–1970
1969	Stephen Rae	55	38	1969–1973
1969	Glenn Elliott	138	69	1969–1977
1969	Colin Antonie	17	7	1969–1971

=== 1970s ===
Debut Year	Player	Games	Goals	Years at Club
1970	John McIntosh	51	29	1970–1972
1970	Darryl Nisbet	1	0	1970
1971	Bill Barrot	2	4	1971
1971	Rod Galt	77	79	1971–1974
1971	Keith Smythe	11	5	1971
1971	John Stephens	43	91	1971–1973
1971	Shane Grambeau	51	39	1971–1975
1971	Wayne Judson	124	0	1971–1977
1972	John Anthony	3	0	1972
1972	David Ellis	27	4	1972–1974, 1977
1972	Mike Lanyon	6	4	1972
1972	Graham Scott	18	14	1972–1973
1972	Derek Feldmann	3	0	1972
1972	Mick Malthouse	53	5	1972–1976
1972	Ian Corner	13	5	1972–1973
1973	Russell Reynolds	68	30	1973–1976
1973	George Young	108	284	1973–1978
1973	Jeff Sarau	226	119	1973–1983
1973	Ian George	7	4	1973–1974
1973	Peter Bell	33	33	1973–1977
1973	Robert Elliott	60	15	1973, 1975–1978
1973	Russell Davies	9	4	1973
1973	Allan Harper	9	0	1973–1974
1973	Val Perovic	77	12	1973, 1975–1979
1974	Paul Callery	105	98	1974–1980
1974	Bruce Duperouzel	139	160	1974–1982
1974	Russell Greene	120	52	1974–1980
1974	Lance Taylor	5	1	1974
1974	Bill Mildenhall	77	17	1974–1979, 1981–1982
1974	Neil Chandler	6	3	1974
1974	Robbie Muir	68	23	1974–1978, 1980, 1984
1974	David Legge	3	3	1974–1975
1974	Simon Deacon	2	0	1974–1975
1975	Lindsay Thomas	4	0	1975
1975	Trevor Barker	230	134	1975–1989
1975	Colin Carter	49	16	1975–1977, 1979–1980
1975	Bill Cannon	1	0	1975
1976	Rex Hunt	57	111	1976–1978
1976	Gary Lofts	60	102	1976–1979, 1981
1976	Phil Stevens	41	3	1976–1979
1976	Ian Baker	50	3	1976–1979
1976	Mark Greene	7	0	1976–1977
1976	David Shepherd	4	1	1976–1977
1976	Doug Booth	24	4	1976–1978, 1982
1977	Geoff Cunningham	224	58	1977–1989
1977	Rod Hughes	7	3	1977
1977	Russell Tweeddale	43	26	1977–1979
1977	Graeme Bond	56	28	1977–1980
1977	Mark Carlon	6	1	1977
1977	Craig Williams	8	5	1977
1977	Maurice O'Keefe	51	51	1977–1979
1977	David Blackburn	2	2	1977
1977	Jeff Dunne	101	20	1977–1983
1977	Gerard Cahir	11	2	1977, 1979, 1983
1977	Dale Evans	19	4	1977–1979
1978	Mordy Bromberg	34	11	1978–1981
1978	Don Discher	12	8	1978–1979
1978	Graeme Gellie	32	12	1978, 1981, 1983
1978	Garry Sidebottom	54	86	1978–1980
1978	Grant Thomas	72	21	1978–1983
1978	Chris Stone	23	12	1978–1981
1978	Ian Sartori	47	27	1978–1981
1978	Gary McDonald	14	8	1978–1980
1978	Michael Roberts	77	45	1978–1985
1978	Greg Burns	169	114	1978–1989
1979	Allan Sinclair	2	1	1979
1979	David Granger	3	1	1979
1979	Mark Kellett	55	7	1979–1982
1979	Dean Ross	2	1	1979
1979	Dean Herbert	22	23	1979–1981
1979	Gary Lugg	1	0	1979
1979	Malcolm Scott	10	26	1979–1980
1979	Michael Nettlefold	43	13	1979–1983
1979	Andrew Cross	31	31	1979–1980, 1983–1984

=== 1980s ===
Debut Year	Player	Games	Goals	Years at Club
1980	Alex Jesaulenko	23	20	1980–1981
1980	Neil MacLeod	4	5	1980
1980	Robert Elphinstone	157	51	1980–1989
1980	John Durnan	21	2	1980–1982
1980	Garry Williams	2	0	1980
1980	Eric Clarke	6	6	1980
1980	John Bennett	35	41	1980–1983, 1985–1986
1980	Sean Godsell	2	2	1980–1981
1980	Con Gorozidis	29	64	1980–1982
1980	John Blair	2	0	1980
1980	Tony King	4	2	1980
1980	Mark Scott	34	110	1980–1983
1980	Simon Meehan	55	69	1980–1984
1980	Graham Schodde	5	2	1980
1980	Alby Smedts	10	0	1980–1981
1980	Jeff Fehring	17	3	1980–1981
1980	Geoff Fidler	46	0	1980–1984
1980	Geoff Greetham	3	1	1980
1980	Matt Vane	6	1	1980
1980	Paul Temay	52	20	1980, 1982–1986
1980	Peter Fitzpatrick	4	0	1980
1981	Doug Cox	36	1	1981–1982
1981	Milan Faletic	24	33	1981–1982
1981	Peter Brown	20	4	1981–1982
1981	Gary Odgers	91	28	1981–1987
1981	Peter Huntley	4	0	1981–1982
1981	Stephen Roach	2	1	1981
1981	Rick Sutherland	9	6	1981
1981	Darryl Hewitt	26	20	1981–1982
1981	Glen Middlemiss	16	10	1981–1984
1981	Michael Blees	14	4	1981–1983
1982	Peter Kiel	80	29	1982–1986
1982	Simon O'Donnell	24	18	1982–1983
1982	Greg Packham	17	31	1982–1983
1982	Wayne Slattery	11	12	1982
1982	Paul Armstrong	12	1	1982
1982	John Favier	26	1	1982–1984
1982	Geoff Linke	2	3	1982
1982	Darryl Cowie	56	8	1982–1985
1982	Steven Allan	9	2	1982
1982	Robert Mace	72	32	1982–1986
1982	Glen Brown	31	25	1982–1985
1982	Allan Hassell	6	0	1982
1982	Neil Park	3	5	1982
1982	Malcolm Smith	1	0	1982
1983	Max Crow	40	53	1983–1985
1983	Mark Jackson	10	41	1983
1983	Greg Lane	14	10	1983–1984
1983	Rod Owen	60	103	1983–1984, 1986–1990
1983	Peter Melesso	7	0	1983–1985
1983	Silvio Foschini	69	87	1983–1986, 1988
1983	Mark Foyster	9	2	1983–1984
1983	Tony Lockett	183	898	1983–1994
1983	Paul Morwood	60	14	1983–1985
1983	Dean Chiron	19	19	1983–1984
1983	Terry Smith	44	25	1983–1985
1983	Daryl Cunningham	34	29	1983–1986
1983	Allan Sidebottom	55	18	1983–1987
1983	Chris McAsey	1	0	1983
1983	Geoff Amoore	5	0	1983–1984
1983	Andrew Jobling	24	5	1983, 1985–1987
1984	Phil Cronan	49	21	1984–1986
1984	Phil Narkle	48	37	1984–1986
1984	Greg Sharp	6	1	1984
1984	Stephen Pirrie	7	0	1984
1984	David Winbanks	2	0	1984
1984	Danny Frawley	240	13	1984–1995
1984	John Schultz	3	0	1984
1984	Alan Jenkin	6	4	1984
1984	David Grant	191	75	1984–1995
1984	Jon Riggs	6	1	1984–1985
1984	Peter Curtain	2	0	1984–1985
1985	Geoff Ablett	11	6	1985
1985	Andy Bennett	14	1	1985
1985	Frank Carbone	10	8	1985, 1987
1985	Robert Keeble	2	0	1985
1985	Greg McAdam	10	13	1985
1985	Glenn Boland	3	0	1985
1985	Andrew Manning	31	23	1985–1988
1985	Ben Ingleton	25	9	1985–1986, 1989
1985	Enrico Misso	1	0	1985
1985	Peter Brown	5	2	1985–1986
1985	Mark Buckley	7	4	1985
1986	Mark Gamble	35	0	1986–1988
1986	Brad Gotch	53	62	1986–1990
1986	Warren Jones	31	5	1986–1988
1986	Rene Kink	7	5	1986
1986	Peter McConville	54	23	1986–1989
1986	John Peter-Budge	45	26	1986–1988
1986	David Wittey	24	0	1986–1987
1986	Alister Ford	18	2	1986–1987
1986	Jon Collins	16	2	1986–1987
1986	Tony Evans	27	2	1986–1988
1986	Jamie Lamb	33	7	1986–1990
1986	Kain Taylor	76	20	1986–1994
1986	Mick Dwyer	80	61	1986–1995
1986	Frank Coghlan	109	64	1986–1992
1986	Stewart Loewe	321	594	1986–2002
1986	Ricky Nixon	51	32	1986–1988, 1990–1991
1986	Tom Crebbin	1	1	1986
1986	Brendan Littler	3	1	1986
1987	Alex Marcou	24	17	1987–1988
1987	Dean Rice	116	43	1987–1991, 1993
1987	Ken Sheldon	53	24	1987–1989
1987	Nicky Winmar	230	283	1987–1998
1987	Spiro Kourkoumelis	35	15	1987–1990
1987	Robert Neal	20	1	1987–1988
1987	Nathan Burke	323	124	1987–2003
1987	Rod Gladman	1	0	1987
1987	Russell Jeffrey	42	3	1987–1988, 1990–1991
1987	Warwick Green	9	0	1987–1988
1987	Paul Tilley	2	0	1987
1988	Bob Jones	20	2	1988–1989
1988	Steve Turner	12	1	1988–1989
1988	Jayson Daniels	115	26	1988–1992, 1996–1998
1988	Sean Simpson	7	1	1988–1990
1988	Ian Muller	21	2	1988, 1990–1991
1988	Peter Freeman	5	0	1988–1990
1988	Mark Dwyer	1	0	1988
1988	Brett Bowey	85	79	1988–1994
1988	Robert Harvey	383	215	1988–2008
1988	Glenn MacMillan	1	0	1988
1988	Gordon Fode	52	31	1988–1995
1989	Danny Craven	33	10	1989, 1991–1992
1989	Paul Harding	62	7	1989–1991
1989	Peter Russo	33	20	1989–1990
1989	Craig Devonport	94	80	1989–1995
1989	Robert Handley	4	2	1989
1989	Lazar Vidovic	80	13	1989, 1991–1997
1989	Ian Dargie	10	1	1989–1990
1989	Brian Winton	5	4	1989

=== 1990s ===
Debut Year	Player	Games	Goals	Years at Club
1990	Damian Kitschke	29	14	1990–1991
1990	Jim Krakouer	13	7	1990–1991
1990	Grant Lawrie	17	2	1990
1990	Tim Pekin	112	37	1990–1995
1990	Jody Arnol	13	6	1990–1991
1990	Christian Lister	1	0	1990
1990	Dermot McNicholl	3	1	1990
1990	Luke Donald	3	3	1990
1990	Bernie Harris	5	0	1990
1990	Greg Doyle	2	3	1990
1990	Damian Sexton	4	1	1990
1990	Steven Cummings	14	0	1990–1992
1990	Aldo Dipetta	5	3	1990, 1992
1991	Gilbert McAdam	53	48	1991–1993
1991	Russell Morris	66	32	1991–1994
1991	Stephen Newport	39	8	1991–1993
1991	Brian Wilson	7	16	1991
1991	Darren Davies	2	4	1991
1991	Tony Antrobus	6	5	1991
1991	Sean Ralphsmith	30	5	1991–1994
1991	Jeff Hilton	6	6	1991–1992
1991	Rohan Smith	3	0	1991
1991	Greg Jones	2	0	1991
1991	Tim Allen	22	13	1991–1992
1991	Dean Greig	33	8	1991–1994
1992	Steven Clark	6	7	1992
1992	Darren Flanigan	8	4	1992
1992	Adrian Fletcher	22	10	1992
1992	Michael Ford	2	0	1992
1992	Dale Kickett	21	20	1992
1992	Jamie Shanahan	125	0	1992–1997
1992	Justin Peckett	252	50	1992–2006
1992	John Georgiou	16	2	1992–1995
1992	Lawrence Bingham	22	0	1992–1993
1993	Dean Anderson	67	26	1993–1996
1993	Mark Arceri	5	5	1993
1993	Darren Bourke	32	9	1993–1996
1993	Peter Everitt	180	299	1993–2002
1993	Chris Hollow	24	5	1993–1995
1993	Chris Wittman	9	0	1993
1993	Craig O'Brien	52	116	1993–1995
1993	Ian Aitken	5	0	1993
1993	Nick Hanson	1	0	1993
1993	Brodie Atkinson	2	0	1993
1993	Damen Shaw	40	15	1993–1995
1993	Martin Heppell	5	0	1993–1994
1993	Leigh Capsalis	1	0	1993
1994	Doug Bailey	11	2	1994–1995
1994	Michael Frost	11	2	1994
1994	David Strooper	6	3	1994
1994	Kristian Bardsley	53	18	1994–1998
1994	Adrian Burns	4	1	1994
1994	Rod Keogh	60	21	1994–1998
1994	Shane Wakelin	94	19	1994–2000
1994	Wayne Thornborrow	13	10	1994–1995
1994	Anthony Harvey	4	1	1994
1994	Sam Jones	3	3	1994
1994	Alister Carr	4	1	1994
1994	Matthew Lappin	55	26	1994–1998
1994	Clinton Shaw	6	0	1994
1994	David Sierakowski	93	27	1994–2000
1995	Austinn Jones	226	127	1995–2005
1995	Steven Sziller	118	38	1995–2000
1995	Darryl Wakelin	115	8	1995–2000
1995	Glen Coghlan	29	7	1995–1997
1995	Josh Kitchen	3	1	1995
1995	Dean Matthews	1	0	1995
1995	Glenn Nugent	11	1	1995
1995	Joel Smith	58	51	1995–1997
1995	Mark Kennedy	8	0	1995
1995	Tony Brown	108	62	1995–2000
1995	Matthew Jackson	4	2	1995
1995	Chris Hemley	1	0	1995
1996	Joe McLaren	57	33	1996–2000
1996	Andrew McLean	6	1	1996
1996	Robert Neill	23	7	1996–1997
1996	Jason Traianidis	62	36	1996–2001
1996	Luke Beveridge	45	37	1996–1999
1996	Jason Cripps	60	10	1996–1998, 2001–2002
1996	Anthony Darcy	3	0	1996
1996	Matthew Young	97	14	1996–2001
1996	Barry Hall	88	144	1996–2001
1996	Jamie Elliott	9	1	1996
1996	Daniel Healy	38	24	1996–1999
1997	Brett Cook	18	5	1997–1999
1997	Troy Gray	9	2	1997
1997	Max Hudghton	234	14	1997–2009
1997	Andrew Thompson	221	93	1997–2007
1997	Jason Heatley	60	163	1997–2000
1997	Brad Campbell	22	2	1997–1999
1998	Gavin Mitchell	52	64	1998–2000
1998	Brett Knowles	43	8	1998–2001
1998	Ben Thompson	11	2	1998–1999
1998	Tim Elliott	47	10	1998–2001
1998	Sam Cranage	8	1	1998–2000
1999	Tony Francis	19	5	1999
1999	Damien Ryan	30	3	1999–2001
1999	Ben Walton	23	15	1999–2001
1999	Steven Baker	203	35	1999–2011
1999	Matthew Carr	28	2	1999–2000
1999	Lenny Hayes	297	95	1999–2014
1999	James Gowans	4	2	1999
1999	James Begley	36	7	1999–2002

=== 2000s ===
Debut Year	Player	Games	Goals	Years at Club
2000	Sean Charles	8	6	2000
2000	Tony Delaney	33	6	2000–2001
2000	Damian Monkhorst	10	0	2000
2000	Justin Plapp	26	8	2000–2002
2000	Chad Davis	31	17	2000–2002
2000	Fred Campbell	7	4	2000
2000	Troy Schwarze	71	20	2000–2006
2000	Brett Moyle	48	11	2000–2004
2000	Jason Blake	219	38	2000–2013
2000	Caydn Beetham	37	9	2000–2002
2001	Craig Callaghan	29	25	2001–2002
2001	Matthew Capuano	25	13	2001–2003
2001	Mark Gale	13	3	2001
2001	Aaron Hamill	98	125	2001–2006
2001	Robert Powell	10	7	2001
2001	Brett Voss	135	56	2001–2007
2001	Fraser Gehrig	145	390	2001–2008
2001	Justin Koschitzke	200	247	2001–2013
2001	Steven Lawrence	39	17	2001–2003
2001	Stephen Milne	275	574	2001–2013
2001	Daniel Wulf	30	17	2001–2003
2001	Chris Oliver	10	1	2001–2003
2001	Nick Riewoldt	336	718	2001–2017
2002	Heath Black	54	19	2002–2004
2002	Trent Knobel	41	8	2002–2004
2002	Xavier Clarke	105	49	2002–2009
2002	Nick Dal Santo	260	140	2002–2014
2002	Matt Maguire	99	19	2002–2009
2002	Leigh Montagna	287	155	2002–2017
2003	Luke Ball	142	58	2003–2009
2003	Barry Brooks	10	3	2003, 2005–2007
2003	Luke Penny	45	2	2003–2005
2003	Stephen Powell	68	30	2003–2006
2003	Brendon Goddard	205	104	2003–2012
2003	Allan Murray	15	13	2003–2006
2003	Matthew Ferguson	12	0	2003–2005, 2007–2008
2003	Leigh Fisher	55	5	2003–2010
2004	Brent Guerra	31	44	2004–2005
2004	Sam Fisher	228	22	2004–2016
2004	Jason Gram	154	71	2004–2012
2004	Raphael Clarke	85	9	2004–2012
2004	Nick Stone	3	0	2004–2005
2005	Cain Ackland	41	18	2005–2006
2005	Aaron Fiora	62	33	2005–2008
2005	Mark McGough	12	2	2005–2006
2005	Andrew McQualter	89	37	2005–2011
2005	James Gwilt	126	25	2005–2014
2006	Fergus Watts	1	1	2006
2006	Sam Gilbert	208	38	2006–2018
2006	Michael Rix	29	3	2006–2008
2007	Jayden Attard	20	2	2007
2007	Matthew Clarke	10	0	2007
2007	Shane Birss	20	13	2007–2008
2007	Clinton Jones	149	40	2007–2014
2007	David Armitage	169	98	2007–2019
2007	Brad Howard	2	0	2007
2007	Justin Sweeney	1	0	2007
2008	Charlie Gardiner	12	9	2008
2008	Michael Gardiner	52	23	2008–2011
2008	Jarryn Geary	207	34	2008–2022
2008	Steven King	47	8	2008–2010
2008	Adam Schneider	130	160	2008–2015
2008	Sean Dempster	168	13	2008–2017
2008	Jarryd Allen	4	0	2008
2008	Robert Eddy	33	10	2008–2010
2009	Zac Dawson	63	3	2009–2011
2009	Farren Ray	130	26	2009–2015
2009	Colm Begley	1	0	2009
2009	Jack Steven	183	112	2009–2019

=== 2010s ===
Debut Year	Player	Games	Goals	Years at Club
2010	Brett Peake	43	20	2010–2012
2010	Adam Pattison	5	1	2010
2010	Nick Heyne	3	0	2010
2010	Luke Miles	2	0	2010
2011	Ryan Gamble	11	11	2011
2011	Daniel Archer	1	0	2011
2011	Alistair Smith	3	0	2011
2011	Will Johnson	1	0	2011
2011	Arryn Siposs	28	22	2011–2015
2011	Dean Polo	21	7	2011–2012
2011	Nicholas Winmar	2	0	2011
2011	Tom Ledger	8	4	2011–2013
2011	Tom Simpkin	31	2	2011–2015
2012	Terry Milera	30	31	2012–2014
2012	Jack Newnes	155	55	2012–2019
2012	Beau Maister	21	26	2012–2014
2012	Ahmed Saad	33	48	2012–2013
2012	Sam Dunell	12	1	2012–2014
2012	Sebastian Ross	211	36	2012–2024
2013	Trent Dennis-Lane	10	9	2013–2014
2013	Dylan Roberton	92	15	2013–2021
2013	Tom Lee	17	18	2013–2016
2013	Nathan Wright	35	9	2013–2018
2013	Brodie Murdoch	22	9	2013–2016
2013	Josh Saunders	22	7	2013–2015
2013	Jimmy Webster	180	4	2013–2025
2013	Jackson Ferguson	1	0	2013
2013	Tom Curren	25	9	2011–2016
2013	Darren Minchington	28	22	2013–2018
2013	Cameron Shenton	24	8	2013–2016
2014	Jack Billings	155	108	2014–2023
2014	Luke Delaney	37	0	2014–2016
2014	Luke Dunstan	116	46	2014–2022
2014	Shane Savage	109	26	2014–2020
2014	Eli Templeton	14	6	2014–2016
2014	Billy Longer	57	4	2014–2019
2014	Blake Acres	75	29	2014–2019
2014	Maverick Weller	89	55	2014–2018
2014	Spencer White	2	4	2014–2015
2015	Jack Lonie	87	73	2015–2021
2015	Tim Membrey	178	293	2015–2024
2015	Jack Sinclair^	210	69	2015–
2015	Paddy McCartin	35	34	2015–2018
2015	Daniel McKenzie	73	11	2015–2023
2015	Hugh Goddard	10	1	2015–2018
2015	Jason Holmes	5	0	2015–2017
2016	Jade Gresham	136	136	2016–2023
2016	Lewis Pierce	5	1	2016–2019
2016	Brandon White	11	1	2016–2019
2017	Nathan Brown	53	0	2017–2019
2017	Jake Carlisle	66	8	2016–2021
2017	Jack Steele	185	61	2017–2025
2017	Ben Long	79	31	2017–2022
2017	Koby Stevens	17	6	2017–2018
2017	Josh Battle	123	30	2017–2024
2017	Rowan Marshall^	156	78	2017–
2018	Hunter Clark^	111	14	2018–
2018	Nick Coffield	52	2	2018–2023
2018	Ed Phillips	15	4	2018–2020
2018	Bailey Rice	11	0	2018–2019
2018	Logan Austin	7	0	2018–2020
2018	Darragh Joyce	13	0	2018–2022
2018	Nathan Freeman	2	1	2018
2018	Ben Paton	71	4	2018–2024
2019	Dean Kent	37	28	2019–2022
2019	Matthew Parker	19	16	2019–2020
2019	Callum Wilkie^	155	1	2019–
2019	Jonathon Marsh	11	3	2019–2020
2019	Robbie Young	3	2	2019
2019	Nick Hind	21	17	2019–2020
2019	Dan Hannebery	18	5	2019–2022
2019	Doulton Langlands	3	2	2019
2019	Sam Rowe	1	0	2019

=== 2020s ===
Debut Year	Player	Games	Goals	Years at Club
2020	Dan Butler^	106	119	2020–
2020	Bradley Hill^	128	30	2020–
2020	Dougal Howard^	93	1	2020–
2020	Zak Jones	74	13	2020–2025
2020	Max King^	83	159	2019–
2020	Paddy Ryder	38	26	2020–2022
2020	Ryan Byrnes^	80	15	2020–
2020	Jack Bytel	22	3	2020–2023
2020	Ryan Abbott	1	1	2020
2021	Jack Higgins^	102	175	2021–
2021	Tom Highmore	16	0	2021–2023
2021	Paul Hunter	7	2	2021
2021	Shaun McKernan	4	2	2021
2021	Mason Wood^	91	73	2021–
2021	Brad Crouch	66	22	2021–2024
2021	James Frawley	2	0	2021
2021	Oscar Clavarino	5	0	2021
2021	Leo Connolly	7	1	2021–2023
2021	Cooper Sharman^	70	80	2021–
2022	Mitchito Owens^	72	74	2022–
2022	Jack Hayes	8	9	2022–2024
2022	Nasiah Wanganeen-Milera^	86	23	2022–
2022	Jarrod Lienert	11	0	2022
2022	Marcus Windhager^	75	10	2022–
2022	Tom Campbell	4	0	2022–2024
2023	Mattaes Phillipou^	44	25	2023–
2023	Zaine Cordy	23	9	2023–2025
2023	Liam Stocker^	56	0	2023–
2023	Anthony Caminiti^	56	38	2023–
2023	Jack Peris	1	0	2023
2024	Riley Bonner	19	1	2024
2024	Lance Collard^	15	8	2024–
2024	Liam Henry^	18	9	2024–
2024	Darcy Wilson^	41	30	2024–
2024	Angus Hastie^	14	1	2024–
2024	Hugo Garcia^	26	5	2024–
2024	Paddy Dow^	10	3	2024–
2024	Arie Schoenmaker	7	0	2024–2025
2024	Angus McLennan	3	0	2024–2025
2025	Harry Boyd	1	0	2025
2025	Max Hall^	22	23	2025–
2025	Jack Macrae^	21	1	2025–
2025	Liam O'Connell^	7	0	2025–
2025	Isaac Keeler^	11	10	2025–
2025	Tobie Travaglia^	12	2	2025–
2025	Hugh Boxshall^	11	2	2025–
2025	Jack Carroll^	3	0	2025–
2025	Alix Tauru^	10	1	2025–
2025	Max Heath	4	3	2025
2025	Alex Dodson^	1	0	2025–
2026	Tom de Koning^	0	0	2026–
2026	Sam Flanders^	0	0	2026–
2026	Liam Ryan^	0	0	2026–
2026	Jack Silvagni^	0	0	2026–
2026	Charlie Banfield^	0	0	2026–

== Listed players yet to make their AFL debuts for St Kilda ==
Player	Date of birth	Acquired	Recruited from	Listed	
Player	Date of birth	Acquired	Recruited from	Rookie	Senior
James Barrat	23 November 2006	Pick 32, 2024 AFL draft	Bendigo Pioneers	—N/a	2025–
Patrick Said	24 April 2006	Pick 60, 2024 AFL draft	Calder Cannons	2026–	2025
Kye Fincher	18 November 2007	Pick 52, 2025 AFL draft	Sandringham Dragons		2026–
Kobe McDonald	8 December 2007	Category B rookie selection	Mayo GAA	2026–	—N/a

== AFL Women's players ==
Key
Order	Players are listed in order of debut
Debut	Debuts are for AFL Women's regular season and finals series matches only
Years at Club	Includes St Kilda only careers and spans from the season of the player's debut to the year in which they played their final game for the St Kilda
Games	Statistics are for AFL Women's regular season and finals series matches only and are correct to round 2, 2025.
Goals	Statistics are for AFL Women's regular season and finals series matches only and are correct to round 2, 2025.
	Currently listed players

=== 2020s ===
Order	Debut	Player	Games	Goals	Years at Club
1	Round 1, 2020	Alison Brown	11	0	2020–2021
2	Round 1, 2020	Rosie Dillon	31	1	2020–2023
3	Round 1, 2020	Nat Exon	28	12	2020–
4	Round 1, 2020	Clara Fitzpatrick	12	0	2020–2022 (S7)
5	Round 1, 2020	Caitlin Greiser	34	29	2020–2022 (S7)
6	Round 1, 2020	Tilly Lucas-Rodd	25	1	2020–2022 (S6)
7	Round 1, 2020	Emma Mackie	2	0	2020
8	Round 1, 2020	Kate McCarthy	16	2	2020–2022 (S6)
9	Round 1, 2020	Molly McDonald^	51	12	2020–
10	Round 1, 2020	Kelly O'Neill	3	0	2020
11	Round 1, 2020	Georgia Patrikios^	37	8	2020–
12	Round 1, 2020	Cat Phillips	24	0	2020–2022 (S6)
13	Round 1, 2020	Hannah Priest^	58	2	2020–
14	Round 1, 2020	Jess Sedunary	4	2	2020
15	Round 1, 2020	Kate Shierlaw	34	24	2020–2022 (S7)
16	Round 1, 2020	Olivia Vesely^	40	5	2020–
17	Round 1, 2020	Nadia von Bertouch	6	0	2020–2021
18	Round 1, 2020	Rhiannon Watt	22	1	2020–2022 (S6)
19	Round 1, 2020	Tarni White	32	3	2020–2022 (S7)
20	Round 1, 2020	Claudia Whitfort	10	2	2020–2021
21	Round 1, 2020	Nicola Xenos^	39	15	2020–
22	Round 2, 2020	Alison Drennan	5	0	2020
23	Round 2, 2020	Darcy Guttridge^	52	18	2020–
24	Round 2, 2020	Courteney Munn	3	0	2020
25	Round 3, 2020	Tamara Luke	6	1	2020–2021
26	Round 3, 2020	Isabella Shannon	17	1	2020–2022 (S6)
27	Round 4, 2020	Poppy Kelly	6	0	2020–2021
28	Round 5, 2020	Sammie Johnson	1	0	2020
29	Round 1, 2021	Alice Burke^	44	1	2021–
30	Round 1, 2021	Tahlia Meyer	10	0	2021–2022 (S6)
31	Round 1, 2021	Renee Saulitis	10	0	2021–2023
32	Round 1, 2021	Tyanna Smith^	32	12	2021–
33	Round 1, 2021	Jayde Van Dyk	20	0	2021–2023
34	Round 1, 2021	Jacqui Vogt	17	4	2021–2022 (S6)
35	Round 2, 2021	Bianca Jakobsson^	47	0	2021–
36	Round 3, 2021	Jessica Matin	18	15	2021–2022 (S7)
37	Round 4, 2021	Rebecca Ott^	22	0	2021–
38	Round 1, 2022 (S6)	Lucy Burke	12	1	2022 (S6)–2022 (S7)
39	Round 1, 2022 (S6)	Leah Cutting	7	0	2022 (S6)
40	Round 1, 2022 (S6)	Alana Woodward	2	0	2022 (S6)
41	Round 3, 2022 (S6)	Ashleigh Richards^	40	14	2022 (S6)–
42	Round 5, 2022 (S6)	Ella Friend^	35	6	2022 (S6)–
43	Round 1, 2022 (S7)	Erin McKinnon	7	0	2022 (S7)–2023
44	Round 1, 2022 (S7)	Nicola Stevens^	33	4	2022 (S7)–
45	Round 1, 2022 (S7)	Hannah Stuart^	18	9	2022 (S7)–
46	Round 4, 2022 (S7)	Simone Nalder	14	0	2022 (S7)–
47	Round 4, 2022 (S7)	Deanna Jolliffe	9	1	2022 (S7)–2023
48	Round 5, 2022 (S7)	J'Noemi Anderson^	21	6	2022 (S7)–
49	Round 1, 2023	Maddie Boyd	8	1	2023–
50	Round 1, 2023	Steph Chiocci	6	0	2023–
51	Round 1, 2023	Grace Kelly	10	0	2023–
52	Round 1, 2023	Jaimee Lambert^	23	8	2023–
53	Round 1, 2023	Beth Pinchin	5	0	2023–
54	Round 1, 2023	Natalie Plane^	16	1	2023–
55	Round 1, 2023	Jesse Wardlaw^	23	22	2023–
56	Round 1, 2023	Serene Watson^	22	0	2023–
57	Round 1, 2024	Paige Trudgeon^	13	1	2024–
58	Round 1, 2024	Rene Caris^	7	1	2024–
59	Round 1, 2024	Charlotte Simpson^	10	0	2024–
60	Round 3, 2024	Emmelie Fiedler^	6	0	2024–
61	Round 7, 2024	Kiera Whiley	3	0	2024–
62	Round 1, 2025	Charlotte Baskaran	2	0	2025–
63	Round 1, 2025	Zoe Besanko	2	2	2025–
64	Round 1, 2025	Amber Clarke	2	1	2025–
65	Round 1, 2025	Arianna Clarke	2	0	2025–
66	Round 1, 2025	Kyla Forbes	2	0	2025–
67	Round 2, 2025	Nicola Barr	1	0	2025–

== See also ==
- List of St Kilda Football Club coaches
