= Patrick Cunningham =

Patrick Cunningham may refer to:

- Patrick Cunningham (politician)
- Patrick Cunningham (inventor)
- Patrick Cunningham (veteran)
- Pat Cunningham, Australian rules footballer
