= Robert Keeble =

Australian rules footballer

Personal information
- Full name: Robert Keeble
- Born: 17 March 1959 (age 67)
- Original team: Red Cliffs
- Height: 183 cm (6 ft 0 in)
- Weight: 93 kg (205 lb)

Playing career^{1}
Years	Club	Games (Goals)
1985	St Kilda	2 (0)
- ^{1} Playing statistics correct to the end of 1985.

Robert Keeble (born 17 March 1959) is a former Australian rules footballer who played with St Kilda in the Victorian Football League (VFL).
