= Les McDonald (Australian footballer) =

Australian rules footballer

Personal information
- Full name: Les McDonald
- Born: 14 July 1885
- Died: 4 October 1955 (aged 70)
- Original team: St Kilda Trades

Playing career^{1}
Years	Club	Games (Goals)
1909	St Kilda	17 (0)
- ^{1} Playing statistics correct to the end of 1909.

Les McDonald (14 July 1885 – 4 October 1955) was an Australian rules footballer who played with St Kilda in the Victorian Football League (VFL).
