= Allan Hassell =

Australian rules footballer

Personal information
- Full name: Allan Hassell
- Born: 11 May 1958 (age 68); Ballarat
- Original team: Red Cliffs
- Height: 191 cm (6 ft 3 in)
- Weight: 85 kg (187 lb)

Playing career^{1}
Years	Club	Games (Goals)
1982	St Kilda	6 (0)
- ^{1} Playing statistics correct to the end of 1982.

Allan Hassell (born 11 May 1958) is a former Australian rules footballer who played for the St Kilda Football Club in the Victorian Football League (VFL).
