= Bill Stamps =

Australian rules footballer (1921–2007)

Personal information
- Full name: George Wilmot Stamps
- Born: 22 August 1921
- Died: 4 November 2007; Western Australia
- Original team: Malvern Amateurs
- Height: 178 cm (5 ft 10 in)
- Weight: 70 kg (154 lb)

Playing career^{1}
Years	Club	Games (Goals)
1947	St Kilda	3 (0)
- ^{1} Playing statistics correct to the end of 1947.

Bill Stamps (22 August 1921 – 4 November 2007) was a former Australian rules footballer who played with St Kilda in the Victorian Football League (VFL).
