= Herb Clements =

Australian rules footballer

Personal information
- Full name: Herbert John Clements
- Born: 18 January 1882; Carlton, Victoria
- Died: 18 September 1954 (aged 72); Malvern, Victoria
- Original team: Carlton District

Playing career^{1}
Years	Club	Games (Goals)
1901	St Kilda	1 (1)
- ^{1} Playing statistics correct to the end of 1901.

Herbert John Clements (18 January 1882 – 18 September 1954) was an Australian rules footballer who played with St Kilda in the Victorian Football League (VFL).
