= Frank Robertson =

Australian rules footballer

Personal information
- Full name: Frank George Robertson
- Born: 25 April 1882; St Kilda, Victoria
- Died: 1 November 1954 (aged 72); Parkville, Victoria
- Original team: Brighton

Playing career^{1}
Years	Club	Games (Goals)
1905	St Kilda	1 (0)
- ^{1} Playing statistics correct to the end of 1905.

Frank George Robertson (25 April 1882 – 1 November 1954) was an Australian rules footballer who played with St Kilda in the Victorian Football League (VFL).
