= Tony Richardson (Australian footballer) =

Australian rules footballer

Personal information
- Born: 28 June 1925
- Died: 17 December 1999 (aged 74)
- Original team: Oakleigh
- Height: 169 cm (5 ft 7 in)
- Weight: 74 kg (163 lb)

Playing career^{1}
Years	Club	Games (Goals)
1947–48	St Kilda	9 (5)
- ^{1} Playing statistics correct to the end of 1948.

Tony Richardson (28 June 1925 – 17 December 1999) was an Australian rules footballer who played with St Kilda in the Victorian Football League (VFL).
