= Greg Lane =

Australian rules footballer

Personal information
- Full name: Greg Lane
- Born: 29 April 1960 (age 66)
- Original team: Frankston YCW
- Height: 175 cm (5 ft 9 in)
- Weight: 74 kg (163 lb)

Playing career^{1}
Years	Club	Games (Goals)
1983–84	St Kilda	14 (10)
- ^{1} Playing statistics correct to the end of 1984.

Greg Lane (born 29 April 1960) is a former Australian rules footballer who played with St Kilda in the Victorian Football League (VFL).
