= Tommy Lang (Australian footballer) =

Australian rules footballer

Personal information
- Full name: Thomas Harold Lang
- Born: 11 November 1890; Kensington, Victoria
- Died: 9 October 1970 (aged 79); Fitzroy, Victoria
- Original team: South Melbourne Churches

Playing career^{1}
Years	Club	Games (Goals)
1915, 1918–19	St Kilda	19 (0)
- ^{1} Playing statistics correct to the end of 1919.

Thomas Harold Lang (11 November 1890 – 9 October 1970) was an Australian rules footballer who played with St Kilda in the Victorian Football League (VFL).
