= Jim Yewers =

Australian rules footballer, born 1917

Personal information
- Full name: James Grover Yewers
- Born: 1 November 1917; Footscray, Victoria
- Died: 19 September 1984 (aged 66); Queensland, Australia
- Original team: University Blacks
- Height: 191 cm (6 ft 3 in)
- Weight: 83 kg (183 lb)

Playing career^{1}
Years	Club	Games (Goals)
1939–40, 1942	St Kilda	22 (15)
- ^{1} Playing statistics correct to the end of 1942.

James Grover Yewers (1 November 1917 – 19 September 1984) was an Australian rules footballer who played with St Kilda in the Victorian Football League (VFL).
