= Leo Garlick =

Australian rules footballer

Personal information
- Full name: Leo Garlick
- Born: 30 April 1938
- Height: 177 cm (5 ft 10 in)
- Weight: 74 kg (163 lb)
- Position: Wing

Playing career^{1}
Years	Club	Games (Goals)
1959–61	St Kilda	43 (9)
- ^{1} Playing statistics correct to the end of 1961.

Leo Garlick (born 30 April 1938) is a former Australian rules footballer who played with St Kilda in the Victorian Football League (VFL).
