= Ernest Nicholls =

Australian rules footballer (1884–1954)

Ernie Nicholls

Personal information
- Full name: Ernest William Nicholls
- Born: 31 March 1884; Richmond, Victoria
- Died: 13 August 1954 (aged 70); South Yarra, Victoria

Playing career^{1}
Years	Club	Games (Goals)
1902	St Kilda	1 (0)
- ^{1} Playing statistics correct to the end of 1902.

Ernest William Nicholls (31 March 1884 – 13 August 1954) was an Australian rules footballer who played with St Kilda in the Victorian Football League (VFL).
