= Bob Kenna =

Australian rules footballer, born 1908

Personal information
- Full name: Eugene Robert Kenna
- Born: 24 October 1908; Ballarat, Victoria
- Died: 17 September 1971 (aged 62); St Kilda, Victoria
- Original team: Sandringham

Playing career^{1}
Years	Club	Games (Goals)
1929–31	Sandringham (VFA)	52 (55)
1932–33	St Kilda	21 (25)
- ^{1} Playing statistics correct to the end of 1933.

Eugene Robert Kenna (24 October 1908 – 17 September 1971) was an Australian rules footballer who played with St Kilda in the Victorian Football League (VFL).
