= Ron Fountain =

Australian rules footballer

Personal information
- Full name: Ron Fountain
- Born: 16 June 1935 (age 91)
- Original team: Dandenong
- Height: 170 cm (5 ft 7 in)
- Weight: 62 kg (137 lb)
- Position: Wing / Half Forward

Playing career^{1}
Years	Club	Games (Goals)
1954, 1956	St Kilda	10 (6)
- ^{1} Playing statistics correct to the end of 1956.

Ron Fountain (born 16 June 1935) is a former Australian rules footballer who played with St Kilda in the Victorian Football League (VFL).
