= Jim Camm =

Australian rules footballer

Personal information
- Full name: Jim Camm
- Born: 27 May 1932 (age 94)
- Original team: Oakleigh District
- Height: 189 cm (6 ft 2 in)
- Weight: 86 kg (190 lb)

Playing career^{1}
Years	Club	Games (Goals)
1955	St Kilda	4 (0)
- ^{1} Playing statistics correct to the end of 1955.

Jim Camm (born 27 May 1932) is a former Australian rules footballer who played with St Kilda in the Victorian Football League (VFL).
