= Bill Pickering (Australian footballer) =

Australian rules footballer

Personal information
- Full name: William Stanley Pickering
- Born: 21 June 1879; Castlemaine, Victoria
- Died: 9 August 1939 (aged 60); Traralgon, Victoria

Playing career^{1}
Years	Club	Games (Goals)
1902	St Kilda	6 (1)
- ^{1} Playing statistics correct to the end of 1902.

William Stanley Pickering (21 June 1879 – 9 August 1939) was an Australian rules footballer who played with St Kilda in the Victorian Football League (VFL).
