= Jack Hannagan =

Australian rules footballer

Personal information
- Full name: John Emmett Hannagan
- Born: 16 May 1885; Fitzroy, Victoria
- Died: 12 September 1977 (aged 92); Mount Gambier, South Australia

Playing career^{1}
Years	Club	Games (Goals)
1905	St Kilda	1 (0)
- ^{1} Playing statistics correct to the end of 1905.

John Emmett Hannagan (16 May 1885 – 12 September 1977) was an Australian rules footballer who played with St Kilda in the Victorian Football League (VFL).
