= Bryant Hocking =

Australian rules footballer

Personal information
- Full name: Bryant Hocking
- Born: 28 July 1932
- Died: 18 December 2022 (aged 90)
- Original team: Golden Point
- Height: 173 cm (5 ft 8 in)
- Weight: 75 kg (165 lb)
- Position: Defence

Playing career^{1}
Years	Club	Games (Goals)
1957	St Kilda	13 (2)
- ^{1} Playing statistics correct to the end of 1957.

Bryant Hocking (28 July 1932 – 18 December 2022) was an Australian rules footballer who played with St Kilda in the Victorian Football League (VFL).
