= Ian Dyer =

Australian rules footballer

Personal information
- Full name: Ian Dyer
- Born: 22 August 1948
- Original team: Bairnsdale
- Height: 177 cm (5 ft 10 in)
- Weight: 73 kg (161 lb)
- Position: Rover

Playing career^{1}
Years	Club	Games (Goals)
1967–68	St Kilda	17 (20)
- ^{1} Playing statistics correct to the end of 1968.

Ian Dyer (born 22 August 1948) is a former Australian rules footballer who played with St Kilda in the Victorian Football League (VFL).
