= Bob Flett =

Australian rules footballer, born 1914

Personal information
- Full name: Bob Flett
- Born: 3 March 1914
- Died: 26 November 1999 (aged 85)
- Original team: Longwarry
- Height: 180 cm (5 ft 11 in)
- Weight: 81 kg (179 lb)

Playing career^{1}
Years	Club	Games (Goals)
1936, 1938	St Kilda	15 (8)
- ^{1} Playing statistics correct to the end of 1938.

Bob Flett (3 March 1914 – 26 November 1999) was an Australian rules footballer who played with St Kilda in the Victorian Football League (VFL).
