= Ted Alcorn =

Australian rules footballer

Personal information
- Full name: Edward Alcorn
- Born: 14 June 1884; Blue Mountain near Trentham, Victoria
- Died: 15 August 1967 (aged 83); Perth, Western Australia
- Original team: Trentham

Playing career^{1}
| Years | Club | Games (Goals) |
| 1909 | St Kilda | 2 (0) |
- ^{1} Playing statistics correct to the end of 1909.

Ted Alcorn (14 June 1884 – 15 August 1967) was an Australian rules footballer who played with St Kilda in the Victorian Football League (VFL).
