= Matt Conniff =

Australian rules footballer

Personal information
- Full name: Mathew Joseph Conniff
- Born: 8 February 1877; Carlton, Victoria
- Died: 18 February 1962 (aged 85); Preston, Victoria
- Original team: Carlton District Juniors

Playing career^{1}
Years	Club	Games (Goals)
1897	St Kilda	1 (0)
- ^{1} Playing statistics correct to the end of 1897.

Mathew Joseph Conniff (8 February 1877 – 18 February 1962) was an Australian rules footballer who played with St Kilda in the Victorian Football League (VFL).
