= Jimmy Sheehan =

Australian rules footballer

Personal information
- Full name: James Joseph Sheehan
- Born: 3 April 1884; South Melbourne, Victoria
- Died: 12 October 1939 (aged 55); Melbourne, Victoria

Playing career^{1}
Years	Club	Games (Goals)
1904	St Kilda	1 (2)
- ^{1} Playing statistics correct to the end of 1904.

James Joseph Sheehan (3 April 1884 – 12 October 1939) was an Australian rules footballer who played with St Kilda in the Victorian Football League (VFL).
