= Alex Cuthbertson =

Australian rules footballer

Personal information
- Full name: Henry Alexander Cuthbertson
- Born: 10 June 1931
- Died: 27 November 2008 (aged 77)
- Original team: Ballarat
- Height: 178 cm (5 ft 10 in)
- Weight: 71 kg (157 lb)

Playing career^{1}
Years	Club	Games (Goals)
1956	St Kilda	1 (0)
- ^{1} Playing statistics correct to the end of 1956.

Henry Alexander Cuthbertson (10 June 1931 - 27 November 2008) was an Australian rules footballer who played for the St Kilda Football Club in the Victorian Football League (VFL).
