= Jack Connally =

Australian rules footballer

Personal information
- Full name: Jack Connally
- Born: 22 February 1927
- Died: 6 February 2013 (aged 85)
- Original team: Costerfield
- Height: 178 cm (5 ft 10 in)
- Weight: 73 kg (161 lb)

Playing career^{1}
Years	Club	Games (Goals)
1947	St Kilda	4 (1)
- ^{1} Playing statistics correct to the end of 1947.

Jack Connally (22 February 1927 – 6 February 2013) was an Australian rules footballer who played with St Kilda in the Victorian Football League (VFL).
