= Max Mitchinson =

Australian rules footballer

Personal information
- Full name: Maxwell Mitchinson
- Born: 15 December 1927
- Died: 15 May 2017 (aged 89)
- Original team: Camden
- Height: 178 cm (5 ft 10 in)
- Weight: 71 kg (157 lb)

Playing career^{1}
Years	Club	Games (Goals)
1949–52	St Kilda	17 (8)
- ^{1} Playing statistics correct to the end of 1952.

Max Mitchinson (15 December 1927 – 15 May 2017) was an Australian rules footballer who played with St Kilda in the Victorian Football League (VFL).
