= Henry McNamara (footballer) =

Australian rules footballer (1884–1935)

Personal information
- Full name: Henry McNamara
- Born: 23 January 1884
- Died: 7 November 1935 (aged 51)
- Original team: Poowong

Playing career^{1}
Years	Club	Games (Goals)
1911	St Kilda	1 (0)
- ^{1} Playing statistics correct to the end of 1911.

Henry McNamara (23 January 1884 – 7 November 1935) was an Australian rules footballer who played with St Kilda in the Victorian Football League (VFL).
