= Pat Murphy (Australian footballer, born 1947) =

Australian rules footballer

Personal information
- Full name: Pat Murphy
- Born: 11 April 1947 (age 79)
- Original team: St Kilda CBC
- Height: 169 cm (5 ft 7 in)
- Weight: 70 kg (154 lb)
- Position: Rover

Playing career^{1}
Years	Club	Games (Goals)
1966	St Kilda	1 (0)
- ^{1} Playing statistics correct to the end of 1966.

Pat Murphy (born 11 April 1947) is a former Australian rules footballer who played with St Kilda in the Victorian Football League (VFL).
