= Tom McKay (footballer) =

Australian rules footballer

Personal information
- Full name: Tom McKay
- Born: 24 September 1938 (age 88)
- Original team: Prahran Tech
- Height: 188 cm (6 ft 2 in)
- Weight: 86 kg (190 lb)
- Position: Defence

Playing career^{1}
Years	Club	Games (Goals)
1959, 1962–64	St Kilda	23 (0)
- ^{1} Playing statistics correct to the end of 1964.

Tom McKay (born 24 September 1938) is a former Australian rules footballer who played with St Kilda in the Victorian Football League (VFL).
