= Alan Squire =

Australian rules footballer

Personal information
- Full name: Alan R. Squire
- Born: 9 February 1927
- Died: 12 June 2003 (aged 76)
- Original team: MHSOB
- Height: 188 cm (6 ft 2 in)
- Weight: 81 kg (179 lb)

Playing career^{1}
| Years | Club | Games (Goals) |
| 1948–1954 | St Kilda | 108 (29) |
- ^{1} Playing statistics correct to the end of 1954.

Alan Squire (9 February 1927 – 12 June 2003) was an Australian rules footballer who played with St Kilda in the Victorian Football League (VFL).

Squire played 108 games for St Kilda, between 1948 and 1954, as a defender and in the ruck.

He represented Victoria in 1951 and after leaving St Kilda coached Boronia.
