= Barrie Mau =

Australian rules footballer

Personal information
- Full name: Barrie Mau
- Born: 2 August 1939 (age 87)
- Original team: Ormond Amateurs Victoria Amateurs
- Height: 182 cm (6 ft 0 in)
- Weight: 75 kg (165 lb)
- Positions: Wing, Midfield

Playing career^{1}
Years	Club	Games (Goals)
1960	St Kilda	2 (0)
- ^{1} Playing statistics correct to the end of 1960.

Career highlights
- Represented Victoria in 1960, in the Amateur Football Carnival, Perth, Australia.

Barrie Mau (born 2 August 1939) is a former Australian rules footballer who played for the St Kilda Football Club in the Victorian Football League (VFL).
