= Jock McLorinan =

Australian rules footballer (1906–1953)

Personal information
- Full name: Jock McLorinan
- Born: 31 August 1906
- Died: 11 October 1953 (aged 47)
- Original team: Old Scotch Collegians
- Position: Ruck

Playing career^{1}
Years	Club	Games (Goals)
1931	St Kilda	6 (4)
- ^{1} Playing statistics correct to the end of 1931.

Jock McLorinan (31 August 1906 – 11 October 1953) was an Australian rules footballer who played with St Kilda in the Victorian Football League (VFL).
