= George Rutherford =

Australian rules footballer

Personal information
- Full name: George Henry Rutherford
- Born: 30 July 1875; Richmond, Victoria
- Died: 6 February 1955 (aged 79); Heidelberg, Victoria

Playing career^{1}
Years	Club	Games (Goals)
1897–1900	St Kilda	23 (0)
- ^{1} Playing statistics correct to the end of 1900.

George Henry Rutherford (30 July 1875 – 6 February 1955) was an Australian rules footballer who played with St Kilda in the Victorian Football League (VFL).
