= Max Stephenson =

Australian rules footballer

Personal information
- Full name: Max Stephenson
- Born: 7 May 1935 (age 91)
- Died: 2023
- Height: 178 cm (5 ft 10 in)
- Weight: 76 kg (168 lb)

Playing career^{1}
Years	Club	Games (Goals)
1955–57	St Kilda	7 (0)
- ^{1} Playing statistics correct to the end of 1957.

Max Stephenson (born 7 May 1935) is a former Australian rules footballer who played with St Kilda in the Victorian Football League (VFL).
