= Mark Greene (footballer) =

Australian rules footballer

Personal information
- Full name: Mark Greene
- Born: 8 May 1959 (age 67)
- Original team: Frankston
- Height: 188 cm (6 ft 2 in)
- Weight: 92 kg (203 lb)
- Position: Halfback

Playing career^{1}
Years	Club	Games (Goals)
1976–77	St Kilda	7 (0)
- ^{1} Playing statistics correct to the end of 1977.

Mark Greene (born 8 May 1959) is a former Australian rules footballer who played with St Kilda in the Victorian Football League (VFL).
