= Alf Parker =

Australian rules footballer (1876 –1958)

Personal information
- Full name: Alfred Edward Parker
- Born: 1 May 1876; Bendigo, Victoria
- Died: 30 August 1958 (aged 82); Fremantle, Western Australia

Playing career^{1}
Years	Club	Games (Goals)
1898	St Kilda	1 (0)
- ^{1} Playing statistics correct to the end of 1898.

Alfred Edward Parker (1 May 1876 – 30 August 1958) was an Australian rules footballer who played for the St Kilda Football Club in the Victorian Football League (VFL).
