= Allan McMullen =

Australian rules footballer (1949–2021)

Personal information
- Full name: Allan McMullen
- Born: 2 June 1949
- Died: 10 March 2021 (aged 71)
- Original team: Orbost
- Height: 173 cm (5 ft 8 in)
- Weight: 70 kg (154 lb)

Playing career^{1}
Years	Club	Games (Goals)
1967	St Kilda	5 (1)
- ^{1} Playing statistics correct to the end of 1967.

Allan McMullen (2 June 1949 – 10 March 2021) was an Australian rules footballer who played for the St Kilda Football Club in the Victorian Football League (VFL).
