= Ian Corner =

Australian rules footballer

Personal information
- Full name: Ian Corner
- Born: 21 January 1951 (age 75)
- Original team: Kew Baptists
- Height: 180 cm (5 ft 11 in)
- Weight: 86 kg (190 lb)

Playing career^{1}
Years	Club	Games (Goals)
1972–73	St Kilda	13 (5)
- ^{1} Playing statistics correct to the end of 1973.

Ian Corner (born 21 January 1951) is a former Australian rules footballer who played with St Kilda in the Victorian Football League (VFL).
