= Alby Hosking =

Australian rules footballer

Personal information
- Full name: Albert Jeffrey Hosking
- Born: 27 July 1885; Melbourne, Victoria
- Died: 14 April 1953 (aged 67); Bentleigh, Victoria

Playing career^{1}
Years	Club	Games (Goals)
1909	St Kilda	4 (0)
- ^{1} Playing statistics correct to the end of 1909.

Albert Jeffrey Hosking (27 July 1885 – 14 April 1953) was an Australian rules footballer who played for the St Kilda Football Club in the Victorian Football League (VFL).
