= Bruce Rae =

Australian rules footballer, born 1900

Personal information
- Full name: William Bruce Rae
- Born: 23 January 1900; Carlton, Victoria
- Died: 26 July 1960 (aged 60); Sydney, New South Wales

Playing career^{1}
Years	Club	Games (Goals)
1925–26	St Kilda	7 (4)
- ^{1} Playing statistics correct to the end of 1926.

William Bruce Rae (23 January 1900 – 26 July 1960) was an Australian rules footballer who played with St Kilda in the Victorian Football League (VFL).
