= Ken Phelan =

Australian rules footballer

Personal information
- Full name: Kenneth Martin Phelan
- Born: 2 November 1925; Elsternwick, Victoria
- Died: 17 December 1987 (aged 62); Fitzroy, Victoria
- Original team: Newman
- Height: 184 cm (6 ft 0 in)
- Weight: 82 kg (181 lb)

Playing career^{1}
Years	Club	Games (Goals)
1951	St Kilda	9 (9)
- ^{1} Playing statistics correct to the end of 1951.

Kenneth Martin Phelan (2 November 1925 – 17 December 1987) was an Australian rules footballer who played with St Kilda in the Victorian Football League (VFL).

Phelan also served in the Royal Australian Navy during World War II.
