= Tommy Carswell =

Australian rules footballer

Personal information
- Full name: Thomas Henry Carswell
- Born: 22 October 1901; St Kilda, Victoria
- Died: 28 June 1964 (aged 62); Ormond, Victoria
- Original team: Camberwell

Playing career^{1}
Years	Club	Games (Goals)
1925–1926	St Kilda	3 (1)
- ^{1} Playing statistics correct to the end of 1926.

Thomas Henry Carswell (22 October 1901 – 28 June 1964) was an Australian rules footballer who played with St Kilda in the Victorian Football League (VFL).
