= Jack Whittle =

Australian rules footballer

Personal information
- Full name: Jonathan Edward Whittle
- Born: 10 January 1890; Richmond, Victoria
- Died: 20 July 1973 (aged 83); Heidelberg, Victoria
- Original team: Essendon Trades / Essendon (VFA)

Playing career^{1}
Years	Club	Games (Goals)
1910–11	Essendon A (VFA)	5 (3)
1911	St Kilda	1 (0)
- ^{1} Playing statistics correct to the end of 1911.

Jack Whittle (10 January 1890 – 20 July 1973) was an Australian rules footballer who played with St Kilda in the Victorian Football League (VFL).
