= Matt Vane =

Australian rules footballer (born 1961)

Personal information
- Full name: Matt Vane
- Born: 22 February 1961 (age 65)
- Original team: Ormond
- Height: 193 cm (6 ft 4 in)
- Weight: 86 kg (190 lb)

Playing career^{1}
Years	Club	Games (Goals)
1980	St Kilda	6 (1)
- ^{1} Playing statistics correct to the end of 1980.

Matt Vane (born 22 February 1961) is a former Australian rules footballer who played with St Kilda in the Victorian Football League (VFL).
