= Percy Bates (footballer) =

Australian rules footballer, born 1913

Personal information
- Full name: Percy Royal Thomas Bates
- Born: 12 April 1913; Powlett River, Victoria
- Died: 7 April 1998 (aged 84)
- Original team: Caulfield
- Height: 179 cm (5 ft 10 in)
- Weight: 81 kg (179 lb)

Playing career^{1}
Years	Club	Games (Goals)
1937	St Kilda	1 (0)
- ^{1} Playing statistics correct to the end of 1937.

Percy Royal Thomas Bates (12 April 1913 – 7 April 1998) was an Australian rules footballer who played with St Kilda in the Victorian Football League (VFL).
