= Glenn MacMillan =

Australian rules footballer

Personal information
- Full name: Glenn MacMillan
- Born: 18 October 1969 (age 57)
- Height: 193 cm (6 ft 4 in)
- Weight: 86 kg (190 lb)

Playing career^{1}
Years	Club	Games (Goals)
1988	St Kilda	1 (0)
- ^{1} Playing statistics correct to the end of 1988.

Glenn MacMillan (born 18 October 1969) is a former Australian rules footballer who played with St Kilda in the Victorian Football League (VFL).
