= Arthur Leech (footballer) =

Australian rules footballer

Personal information
- Full name: Arthur Roy Leech
- Born: 20 August 1896; Ballarat, Victoria
- Died: 10 November 1949 (aged 53); Heidelberg, Victoria
- Original team: South Ballarat

Playing career^{1}
Years	Club	Games (Goals)
1920	St Kilda	2 (1)
- ^{1} Playing statistics correct to the end of 1920.

Arthur Roy Leech (20 August 1896 – 10 November 1949) was an Australian rules footballer who played for the St Kilda Football Club in the Victorian Football League (VFL).
