= Jack Mohr =

Australian rules footballer

Personal information
- Full name: Jack Mohr
- Born: 11 July 1906
- Died: 7 June 1971 (aged 64)
- Original team: Wagga Wagga
- Height: 179 cm (5 ft 10 in)
- Weight: 84 kg (185 lb)

Playing career^{1}
| Years | Club | Games (Goals) |
| 1929 | St Kilda | 4 (2) |
- ^{1} Playing statistics correct to the end of 1929.

Jack Mohr (11 July 1906 – 7 June 1971) was an Australian rules footballer who played with St Kilda in the Victorian Football League (VFL).
