= Stan Sheehan =

Australian rules footballer

Personal information
- Full name: Stephen John Sheehan
- Born: 8 September 1886; Winslow, Victoria
- Died: 3 August 1957 (aged 70); Essendon, Victoria
- Original team: Albert Park
- Height: 180 cm (5 ft 11 in)
- Weight: 80 kg (176 lb)

Playing career^{1}
Years	Club	Games (Goals)
1910	St Kilda	5 (1)
- ^{1} Playing statistics correct to the end of 1910.

Stan Sheehan (8 September 1886 – 3 August 1957) was an Australian rules footballer who played with St Kilda in the Victorian Football League (VFL).
