= Geoff Fidler =

Australian rules footballer

Personal information
- Full name: Geoff Fidler
- Born: 14 March 1961 (age 65)
- Original team: East Brighton
- Height: 180 cm (5 ft 11 in)
- Weight: 74 kg (163 lb)
- Position: Back Pocket

Playing career^{1}
| Years | Club | Games (Goals) |
| 1980–84 | St Kilda | 46 (0) |
- ^{1} Playing statistics correct to the end of 1984.

Geoff Fidler (born 14 March 1961) is a former Australian rules footballer who played with St Kilda in the Victorian Football League (VFL).
