= Ian George (footballer) =

Australian rules footballer

Personal information
- Full name: Ian Reginald George
- Born: 6 April 1954 (age 72)
- Original team: Highett West
- Height: 173 cm (5 ft 8 in)
- Weight: 73 kg (161 lb)
- Position: Rover

Playing career^{1}
Years	Club	Games (Goals)
1973–74	St Kilda	7 (4)
- ^{1} Playing statistics correct to the end of 1974.

Ian Reginald George (born 6 April 1954) is a former Australian rules footballer who played with St Kilda in the Victorian Football League (VFL).
