= Bruce McLennan =

Australian rules footballer

Bruce Ward McLennan

Personal information
- Full name: Bruce McLennan
- Born: 28 April 1928
- Died: 5 August 2015 (aged 87)
- Original team: Collingwood District
- Height: 177 cm (5 ft 10 in)
- Weight: 78 kg (172 lb)
- Position: Back pocket

Playing career^{1}
Years	Club	Games (Goals)
1950, 1952–55	St Kilda	46 (11)
- ^{1} Playing statistics correct to the end of 1955.

Bruce Ward McLennan (28 April 1928 – 5 August 2015) was an Australian rules footballer who played with St Kilda in the Victorian Football League (VFL).
