= Herb Baker =

Australian rules footballer

Personal information
- Full name: Herbert Andrew Baker
- Born: 9 June 1879; St Kilda, Victoria
- Died: 5 July 1952 (aged 73); St Kilda, Victoria
- Original team: St Kilda Trades

Playing career^{1}
Years	Club	Games (Goals)
1910	St Kilda	3 (2)
- ^{1} Playing statistics correct to the end of 1910.

Herbert Andrew Baker (9 June 1879 – 5 July 1952) was an Australian rules footballer who played with St Kilda in the Victorian Football League (VFL).
