= Ted Smith (Australian footballer) =

Australian rules footballer

Personal information
- Full name: Edward Thomas Smith
- Born: 28 May 1887; Richmond, Victoria
- Died: 6 May 1960 (aged 72); Fitzroy, Victoria
- Original team: Prahran

Playing career^{1}
Years	Club	Games (Goals)
1910	St Kilda	1 (0)
- ^{1} Playing statistics correct to the end of 1910.

Edward Thomas Smith (28 May 1887 – 6 May 1960) was an Australian rules footballer who played with St Kilda in the Victorian Football League (VFL).
