= Allan Hutton =

Australian rules footballer

Personal information
- Full name: Allan Hutton
- Born: 27 August 1908
- Died: 23 September 1939 (aged 31)
- Original team: Morwell

Playing career^{1}
Years	Club	Games (Goals)
1927	St Kilda	2 (1)
- ^{1} Playing statistics correct to the end of 1927.

Allan Hutton (27 August 1908 – 23 September 1939) was an Australian rules footballer who played for the St Kilda Football Club in the Victorian Football League (VFL). Hutton died at the age of 31, from injuries sustained when he was struck by a motor bus while riding a bicycle in Yallourn.
