= Bert Field =

Australian rules footballer

Personal information
- Full name: Albert Austin Field
- Born: 5 June 1884; Kangaroo Flat, Victoria
- Died: 27 July 1974 (aged 90); Malvern, Victoria

Playing career^{1}
Years	Club	Games (Goals)
1906	St Kilda	2 (0)
- ^{1} Playing statistics correct to the end of 1906.

Albert Austin Field (5 June 1884 – 27 July 1974) was an Australian rules footballer who played for the St Kilda Football Club in the Victorian Football League (VFL).
