= Laurie Stephenson =

Australian rules footballer

Personal information
- Full name: Laurie Stephenson
- Born: 18 October 1939
- Died: 24 October 2009 (aged 70)
- Original team: Sale
- Height: 189 cm (6 ft 2 in)
- Weight: 81 kg (179 lb)

Playing career^{1}
Years	Club	Games (Goals)
1959–60	St Kilda	15 (21)
- ^{1} Playing statistics correct to the end of 1960.

Laurie Stephenson (18 October 1939 – 24 October 2009) was an Australian rules footballer who played with St Kilda in the Victorian Football League (VFL).
