= Lindsay Cooke =

Australian rules footballer

Lindsay Cook

Personal information
- Full name: Lindsay Cook
- Born: 10 October 1935 (age 91)
- Original team: Hamilton Imperials
- Height: 191 cm (6 ft 3 in)
- Weight: 92 kg (203 lb)

Playing career^{1}
Years	Club	Games (Goals)
1957–58	St Kilda	5 (2)
- ^{1} Playing statistics correct to the end of 1958.

Lindsay Cook (born 10 October 1935) is a former Australian rules footballer who played with St Kilda in the Victorian Football League (VFL).
