= Sam Newman (footballer, born 1901) =

Australian rules footballer (1901–1937)

Personal information
- Full name: Sam Newman
- Born: 6 January 1901
- Died: 15 October 1937 (aged 36)
- Original team: Chelsea

Playing career^{1}
Years	Club	Games (Goals)
1926	St Kilda	2 (0)
- ^{1} Playing statistics correct to the end of 1926.

Sam Newman (6 January 1901 – 15 October 1937) was an Australian rules footballer who played with St Kilda in the Victorian Football League (VFL).
