= Paul Temay =

Australian rules footballer

Personal information
- Full name: Paul Temay
- Born: 4 February 1962 (age 64)

Playing career^{1}
Years	Club	Games (Goals)
1980–1986	St Kilda	52 (20)
1988	Glenelg	13 (2)
Total		65 (22)
- ^{1} Playing statistics correct to the end of 1986.

Paul Temay (born 4 February 1962) is a former Australian rules footballer who played for St Kilda in the Victorian Football League (VFL) and Glenelg Football Club in the South Australian National Football League (SANFL).

His son, Tom, spent two years on the Carlton list between 2013 and 2014 without playing a senior game.
