= George Lomer =

Australian rules footballer, born 1904

Personal information
- Full name: Thomas George Lomer
- Born: 14 May 1904; Port Frederick, Devonport, Tasmania
- Died: 3 May 1966 (aged 61); Tasmania
- Original team: Latrobe
- Height: 188 cm (6 ft 2 in)
- Weight: 84 kg (185 lb)

Playing career^{1}
| Years | Club | Games (Goals) |
| 1927–28 | St Kilda | 14 (8) |
- ^{1} Playing statistics correct to the end of 1928.

Thomas George Lomer (14 May 1904 – 3 May 1966) was an Australian rules footballer who played with St Kilda in the Victorian Football League (VFL).

== Family ==
The son of Thomas Cox Lomer (1859–1937), and Mary Jane Lomer (1861–1939), née Gray, Thomas George Lomer was born at Port Frederick, Devonport, Tasmania on 14 May 1904.

He married Margaret Hutchinson Dodd (1909–1989) at St Kilda on 27 September 1933.
