= Russell Davies (footballer) =

Australian rules footballer

Personal information
- Full name: Russell Davies
- Born: 28 February 1954 (age 72) sunshine
- Original team: East Sandringham
- Height: 175 cm (5 ft 9 in)
- Weight: 76 kg (168 lb)

Playing career^{1}
Years	Club	Games (Goals)
1973	St Kilda	9 (4)
- ^{1} Playing statistics correct to the end of 1973.

Russell Davies (born 28 February 1954) is a former Australian rules footballer who played with St Kilda in the Victorian Football League (VFL).
