= Bill Young (footballer, born 1886) =

Australian rules footballer

Personal information
- Full name: William C. Young
- Born: 18 December 1886
- Died: 12 April 1959 (aged 72)
- Original team: Brighton

Playing career^{1}
| Years | Club | Games (Goals) |
| 1909 | St Kilda | 2 (2) |
- ^{1} Playing statistics correct to the end of 1909.

Bill Young (18 December 1886 – 12 April 1959) was an Australian rules footballer who played with St Kilda in the Victorian Football League (VFL).
