= Gordon Downes =

Australian rules footballer

Personal information
- Full name: Gordon James Downes
- Born: 23 June 1878; Fernihurst, Victoria
- Died: 7 April 1946 (aged 67); Melbourne, Victoria
- Original team: South Yarra

Playing career^{1}
Years	Club	Games (Goals)
1904	St Kilda	1 (0)
- ^{1} Playing statistics correct to the end of 1904.

Gordon James Downes (23 June 1878 – 7 April 1946) was an Australian rules footballer who played with St Kilda in the Victorian Football League (VFL).
