= Max Hellmrich =

Australian rules footballer

Personal information
- Full name: Maxwell George Hellmrich
- Born: 30 August 1932
- Died: 12 August 2013 (aged 80)
- Original team: Swan Districts
- Height: 174 cm (5 ft 9 in)
- Weight: 68 kg (150 lb)

Playing career^{1}
Years	Club	Games (Goals)
1953	Swan Districts	13 (12)
1954	St Kilda	2 (1)
- ^{1} Playing statistics correct to the end of 1954.

Maxwell George Hellmrich (30 August 1932 – 12 August 2013) was an Australian rules footballer who played with Swan Districts in the West Australian Football League (WAFL) and St Kilda in the Victorian Football League (VFL).
