= Geoff Driver =

Australian rules footballer

Personal information
- Full name: Geoff Driver
- Born: 31 December 1920
- Died: 25 April 2013 (aged 92)
- Height: 173 cm (5 ft 8 in)
- Weight: 70 kg (154 lb)

Playing career^{1}
Years	Club	Games (Goals)
1945–46	St Kilda	22 (22)
1947	South Melbourne	2 (0)
Total		24 (22)
- ^{1} Playing statistics correct to the end of 1947.

Geoff Driver (31 December 1920 – 25 April 2013) was an Australian rules footballer who played with St Kilda and South Melbourne in the Victorian Football League (VFL). Won club best first year player in 1945 for St Kilda.
