= Mal Markillie =

Australian rules footballer

Personal information
- Full name: Malcolm Owen Markillie
- Born: 14 December 1880; Ballarat, Victoria
- Died: 9 March 1945 (aged 64); Malvern, Victoria
- Original team: Caulfield

Playing career^{1}
Years	Club	Games (Goals)
1899, 1902–03	St Kilda	21 (8)
- ^{1} Playing statistics correct to the end of 1903.

Malcolm Owen Markillie (14 December 1880 – 9 March 1945) was an Australian rules footballer who played with St Kilda in the Victorian Football League (VFL).

He later owned a hotel in Malvern and owned racehorses.
