= Ted James (footballer) =

Australian rules footballer

Personal information
- Full name: Ted James
- Born: 19 June 1889
- Died: 23 January 1968 (aged 78)
- Height: 170 cm (5 ft 7 in)
- Weight: 66 kg (146 lb)

Playing career^{1}
Years	Club	Games (Goals)
1915	St Kilda	2 (0)
- ^{1} Playing statistics correct to the end of 1915.

Ted James (19 June 1889 – 23 January 1968) was an Australian rules footballer who played with St Kilda in the Victorian Football League (VFL).
