= Fred Dore =

Australian rules footballer

Personal information
- Full name: Frederick Joseph Dore
- Born: 4 September 1903; Neerim, Victoria
- Died: 28 August 1984 (aged 80); Prahran, Victoria
- Original team: Neerim / Prahran

Playing career^{1}
Years	Club	Games (Goals)
1924	St Kilda	8 (1)
- ^{1} Playing statistics correct to the end of 1924.

Frederick Joseph Dore (4 September 1903 – 28 August 1984) was an Australian rules footballer who played with St Kilda in the Victorian Football League (VFL).
