= Nick Bloom =

Australian rules footballer (1930–2011)

Personal information
- Full name: Nick Bloom
- Born: 16 February 1930
- Died: 7 June 2011 (aged 81)
- Original team: Port Melbourne
- Height: 168 cm (5 ft 6 in)
- Weight: 66 kg (146 lb)
- Position: Rover

Playing career^{1}
Years	Club	Games (Goals)
1951–52	St Kilda	28 (32)
- ^{1} Playing statistics correct to the end of 1952.

Nick Bloom (16 February 1930 – 7 June 2011) was an Australian rules footballer who played with St Kilda in the Victorian Football League (VFL).
