= Max Hardie =

Australian rules footballer

Personal information
- Full name: James Maxwell Hardie
- Born: 11 February 1900; Warrnambool, Victoria
- Died: 25 September 1960 (aged 60); Box Hill, Victoria
- Original team: St Kilda District

Playing career^{1}
Years	Club	Games (Goals)
1919	St Kilda	2 (0)
- ^{1} Playing statistics correct to the end of 1919.

James Maxwell Hardie (11 February 1900 – 25 September 1960) was an Australian rules footballer who played with St Kilda in the Victorian Football League (VFL).
