= Bill Clark (Australian footballer) =

Australian rules footballer

Personal information
- Full name: William Charles Clark
- Born: 12 December 1922
- Died: 4 June 2015 (aged 92); Sandringham, Victoria
- Original team: Melbourne High
- Height: 188 cm (6 ft 2 in)
- Weight: 92 kg (203 lb)

Playing career^{1}
Years	Club	Games (Goals)
1943–44	St Kilda	11 (9)
- ^{1} Playing statistics correct to the end of 1944.

William Charles Clark (12 December 1922 – 4 June 2015) was an Australian rules footballer who played with St Kilda in the Victorian Football League (VFL).
