= Jack Hansen =

Australian rules footballer

Personal information
- Full name: John Thomas Hansen
- Born: 28 February 1898
- Died: 23 February 1964 (aged 65)

Playing career^{1}
Years	Club	Games (Goals)
1920	St Kilda	8 (4)
- ^{1} Playing statistics correct to the end of 1920.

Jack Hansen (28 February 1898 – 23 February 1964) was an Australian rules footballer who played with St Kilda in the Victorian Football League (VFL).
