= George Millard =

Australian rules footballer (1914–2009)

Personal information
- Full name: George Leslie Millard
- Born: 11 March 1914; Prahran, Victoria
- Died: 23 March 2009 (aged 95)
- Height: 183 cm (6 ft 0 in)
- Weight: 87 kg (192 lb)

Playing career^{1}
Years	Club	Games (Goals)
1936	St Kilda	7 (0)
1938	Prahran (VFA)	2 (0)
- ^{1} Playing statistics correct to the end of 1938.

George Leslie Millard (11 March 1914 – 23 March 2009) was an Australian rules footballer who played with St Kilda in the Victorian Football League (VFL).

Millard later served in the Australian Army during World War II.
