= Norm Bland =

Australian rules footballer

Personal information
- Full name: Norman William Bland
- Born: 10 March 1889; North Melbourne, Victoria
- Died: 18 September 1947 (aged 58); Brighton, Victoria
- Original team: Elsternwick

Playing career^{1}
Years	Club	Games (Goals)
1909	St Kilda	1 (0)
- ^{1} Playing statistics correct to the end of 1909.

Norman William Bland (10 March 1889 – 18 September 1947) was an Australian rules footballer who played with St Kilda in the Victorian Football League (VFL).
