= Ian Letcher =

Australian rules footballer

Personal information
- Full name: Ian Letcher
- Born: 21 July 1935
- Died: 22 July 2020; Gold Coast Qld
- Original team: North Footscray
- Height: 180 cm (5 ft 11 in)
- Weight: 75 kg (165 lb)
- Position: Centre

Playing career^{1}
Years	Club	Games (Goals)
1953–56	Footscray	18 (1)
1957	St Kilda	4 (0)
Total		22 (1)
- ^{1} Playing statistics correct to the end of 1957.

Ian Letcher (21 July 1935 – 22 July 2020) was an Australian rules footballer who played with Footscray and St Kilda in the Victorian Football League (VFL).
