= Charlie Kay =

Australian rules footballer

Personal information
- Full name: Charles Edmund Kay
- Born: 2 March 1884; St Kilda, Victoria
- Died: 27 September 1964 (aged 80); South Yarra, Victoria
- Original team: Windsor

Playing career^{1}
Years	Club	Games (Goals)
1905	St Kilda	1 (2)
- ^{1} Playing statistics correct to the end of 1905.

Charles Edmund Kay (2 March 1884 – 27 September 1964) was an Australian rules footballer who played with St Kilda in the Victorian Football League (VFL).
