= Les Morrison =

Australian rules footballer

Personal information
- Full name: Leslie John George Morrison
- Born: 25 January 1895
- Died: 12 August 1966 (aged 71)
- Original team: Prahran

Playing career^{1}
Years	Club	Games (Goals)
1922	St Kilda	8 (0)
- ^{1} Playing statistics correct to the end of 1922.

Les Morrison (25 January 1895 – 12 August 1966) was an Australian rules footballer who played with St Kilda in the Victorian Football League (VFL).
