= Les Jamieson =

Australian rules footballer

Personal information
- Full name: William Leslie Loyal Jamieson
- Born: 19 October 1886; Lubeck, Victoria
- Died: 4 January 1944 (aged 57); Geelong, Victoria

Playing career^{1}
Years	Club	Games (Goals)
1910	St Kilda	1 (0)
- ^{1} Playing statistics correct to the end of 1910.

William Leslie Loyal Jamieson (19 October 1886 – 4 January 1944) was an Australian rules footballer who played with St Kilda in the Victorian Football League (VFL).
