= Norm Gravell =

Australian rules footballer, born 1915

Personal information
- Full name: Norman Gravell
- Born: 15 July 1915; South Melbourne, Victoria
- Died: 19 December 1978 (aged 63); Heidelberg, Victoria
- Original team: Prahran
- Height: 170 cm (5 ft 7 in)
- Weight: 67 kg (148 lb)

Playing career^{1}
Years	Club	Games (Goals)
1942	St Kilda	3 (0)
- ^{1} Playing statistics correct to the end of 1942.

Norman Gravell (15 July 1915 – 19 December 1978) was an Australian rules footballer who played with St Kilda in the Victorian Football League (VFL).
