= Sam Everon =

Australian rules footballer

Personal information
- Full name: Sam Everon
- Born: 31 July 1922
- Died: 20 February 1960 (aged 37)
- Height: 173 cm (5 ft 8 in)
- Weight: 74 kg (163 lb)

Playing career^{1}
Years	Club	Games (Goals)
1945	St Kilda	2 (0)
- ^{1} Playing statistics correct to the end of 1945.

Sam Everon (31 July 1922 – 20 February 1960) was an Australian rules footballer who played with St Kilda in the Victorian Football League (VFL).
