= Herb Hudson =

Australian rules footballer

Personal information
- Full name: Herb Hudson
- Born: 28 May 1880
- Died: 9 July 1935 (aged 55)
- Original team: Korumburra

Playing career^{1}
Years	Club	Games (Goals)
1903	St Kilda	2 (0)
- ^{1} Playing statistics correct to the end of 1903.

Herb Hudson (28 May 1880 – 9 July 1935) was an Australian rules footballer who played with St Kilda in the Victorian Football League (VFL).
