= Bernie Hayden =

Australian rules footballer, born 1915

Personal information
- Full name: Bernie Hayden
- Born: 4 January 1915
- Died: 12 July 1971 (aged 56)
- Original team: Xavier College
- Height: 180 cm (5 ft 11 in)
- Weight: 77 kg (170 lb)

Playing career^{1}
Years	Club	Games (Goals)
1936	St Kilda	4 (1)
- ^{1} Playing statistics correct to the end of 1936.

Bernie Hayden (4 January 1915 – 12 July 1971) was an Australian rules footballer who played for the St Kilda Football Club in the Victorian Football League (VFL).
