= Colin Bock =

Australian rules footballer (1934–2019)

Personal information
- Full name: Colin James Bock
- Born: 29 September 1934
- Died: 14 July 2019 (aged 84)
- Height: 185 cm (6 ft 1 in)
- Weight: 86 kg (190 lb)

Playing career^{1}
Years	Club	Games (Goals)
1956	St Kilda	3 (0)
- ^{1} Playing statistics correct to the end of 1956.

Colin James Bock (29 September 1934 – 14 July 2019) was an Australian rules footballer who played with St Kilda in the Victorian Football League (VFL). Bock died on 14 July 2019, at the age of 84.
