= Don Butling =

Australian rules footballer

Personal information
- Full name: Don Butling
- Born: 14 May 1926
- Died: 16 February 2015 (aged 88)
- Original team: Caulfield Juniors / East Malvern
- Height: 179 cm (5 ft 10 in)
- Weight: 73 kg (161 lb)

Playing career^{1}
Years	Club	Games (Goals)
1945	St Kilda	5 (3)
- ^{1} Playing statistics correct to the end of 1945.

Don Butling (14 May 1926 – 16 February 2015) was an Australian rules footballer who played with St Kilda in the Victorian Football League (VFL).
