= Len Boyd-Gerny =

Australian rules footballer

Personal information
- Full name: Leonard Wells Boyd-Gerny
- Born: 21 May 1916; Adelaide, South Australia
- Died: 30 October 2011 (aged 95)
- Original team: Melbourne High School Old Boys
- Height: 175 cm (5 ft 9 in)
- Weight: 67 kg (148 lb)

Playing career^{1}
Years	Club	Games (Goals)
1938	St Kilda	2 (2)
- ^{1} Playing statistics correct to the end of 1938.

Leonard Wells Boyd-Gerny (21 May 1916 – 30 October 2011) was an Australian rules footballer who played with St Kilda in the Victorian Football League (VFL).
