= Fred Linay =

Australian rules footballer

Personal information
- Full name: Frederick Love Linay
- Born: 27 July 1890; South Melbourne, Victoria
- Died: 22 November 1974 (aged 84); South Melbourne, Victoria

Playing career^{1}
Years	Club	Games (Goals)
1911	St Kilda	2 (2)
- ^{1} Playing statistics correct to the end of 1911.

Frederick Love Linay (27 July 1890 – 22 November 1974) was an Australian rules footballer who played with St Kilda in the Victorian Football League (VFL).
