= Arthur Britt =

Australian rules footballer

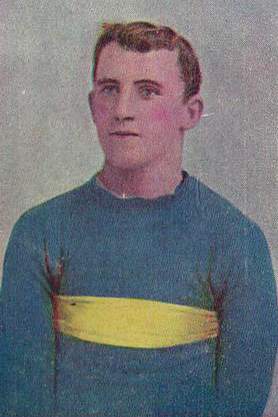
- Cigarette card of Britt in 1905

Personal information
- Full name: Henry Arthur Britt
- Born: 17 May 1883; Williamstown, Victoria
- Died: 23 April 1975 (aged 91); Melbourne, Victoria
- Original team: Celtic

Playing career^{1}
Years	Club	Games (Goals)
1902	Melbourne	1 (2)
1903	St Kilda	3 (0)
Total		4 (2)
- ^{1} Playing statistics correct to the end of 1903.

Henry Arthur Britt (17 May 1883 – 23 April 1975) was an Australian rules footballer who played for the Melbourne Football Club and St Kilda Football Club in the Victorian Football League (VFL). He later played for Williamstown in the Victorian Football Association (VFA) from 1903 to 1906 where he played 43 games and kicked 22 goals and was vice-captain in his final season. Britt received life membership of the Williamstown club in 1908.
