= Ern Woodfield =

Australian rules footballer

Personal information
- Full name: Ernest Alfred Woodfield
- Born: 18 August 1888; South Melbourne, Victoria
- Died: 10 December 1974 (aged 86); Brunswick, Victoria
- Original team: Tramways

Playing career^{1}
| Years | Club | Games (Goals) |
| 1910 | St Kilda | 1 (0) |
- ^{1} Playing statistics correct to the end of 1910.

Ernest Alfred Woodfield (18 August 1888 – 10 December 1974) was an Australian rules footballer who played with St Kilda in the Victorian Football League (VFL).
