= Hugh Crichton =

Australian rules footballer

Personal information
- Full name: Hugh Roy Crichton
- Born: 20 January 1882; Footscray, Victoria
- Died: 7 January 1955 (aged 72); Randwick, New South Wales
- Original team: Footscray Juniors

Playing career^{1}
Years	Club	Games (Goals)
1905	St Kilda	1 (0)
- ^{1} Playing statistics correct to the end of 1905.

Hugh Roy Crichton (20 January 1882 – 7 January 1955) was an Australian rules footballer who played with St Kilda in the Victorian Football League (VFL).
