= Mark Foyster =

Australian rules footballer

Personal information
- Full name: Mark Foyster
- Born: 9 March 1964 (age 62)
- Original team: Mt Eliza
- Height: 183 cm (6 ft 0 in)
- Weight: 78 kg (172 lb)
- Position: Wing

Playing career^{1}
Years	Club	Games (Goals)
1983–1984	St Kilda	9 (2)
- ^{1} Playing statistics correct to the end of 1984.

Mark Foyster (born 9 March 1964) is a former Australian rules footballer who played with St Kilda in the Victorian Football League (VFL).
