= Des Pickett =

Australian rules footballer

Personal information
- Full name: Des Pickett
- Born: 4 June 1925
- Died: 10 June 2016 (aged 91)
- Height: 179 cm (5 ft 10 in)
- Weight: 83 kg (183 lb)

Playing career^{1}
Years	Club	Games (Goals)
1946–50	St Kilda	27 (4)
- ^{1} Playing statistics correct to the end of 1950.

Des Pickett (4 June 1925 – 10 June 2016) was an Australian rules footballer who played with St Kilda in the Victorian Football League (VFL). Desmond Pickett was placed in the cremation wall at the Guildford cemetery Victoria on 26th October 2023 by his daughter and grandson.

== Notes ==
Desmond Pickett was placed in the cremation wall at the Guildford Cemetery Victoria on 26th October 2023 by his daughter and grandson.
