= Reg Wilks =

Australian rules footballer

Personal information
- Full name: Reginald Clarke Wilks
- Born: 2 April 1878; St Kilda, Victoria
- Died: 25 September 1953 (aged 75); Melbourne, Victoria

Playing career^{1}
Years	Club	Games (Goals)
1901	St Kilda	2 (0)
- ^{1} Playing statistics correct to the end of 1901.

Reginald Clarke Wilks (2 April 1897 – 25 September 1953) was an Australian rules footballer who played with St Kilda in the Victorian Football League (VFL) in the summer of 1901. He was married to Gertrude Martha Wilks. He later worked as the hotel keeper at the Brittania Hotel in South Melbourne. In early 1916, he was enlisted as an ANZAC where he was assigned to the 16th Regiment, 21st Battalion. However he was discharged later that year for being medically unfit due to rheumatism. His medical records specify his condition first began in 1901, likely the reason for his football career being so brief.
