= Bill Osborne (Australian footballer) =

Australian rules footballer (1902–1984)

Personal information
- Full name: William Percy Osborne
- Born: 4 November 1902; St Kilda, Victoria
- Died: 4 July 1984 (aged 81); Rye, Victoria

Playing career^{1}
Years	Club	Games (Goals)
1919, 1921	St Kilda	6 (0)
1924	Hawthorn (VFA)	2 (0)
1925–30	Prahran (VFA)	76 (0)
- ^{1} Playing statistics correct to the end of 1930.

William Percy Osborne (4 November 1902 – 4 July 1984) was an Australian rules footballer who played with St Kilda in the Victorian Football League (VFL).

Osborne later played for Hawthorn and Prahran in the Victorian Football Association (VFA).

He was also prominent as a sailor, winning the Australian 14-foot championship on ten occasions.
