= Ern Penny =

Australian rules footballer, born 1912

Personal information
- Full name: Ernest Clifford Penny
- Born: 16 March 1912; Brighton, Victoria
- Died: 10 January 2001 (aged 88)
- Height: 165 cm (5 ft 5 in)
- Weight: 67 kg (148 lb)

Playing career^{1}
Years	Club	Games (Goals)
1934–35	St Kilda	29 (29)
- ^{1} Playing statistics correct to the end of 1935.

Ernest Clifford Penny (16 March 1912 – 10 January 2001) was an Australian rules footballer who played with St Kilda in the Victorian Football League (VFL).
