= Bob Monar =

Australian rules footballer

Personal information
- Full name: Harold Robert Monar
- Born: 31 August 1884; Fitzroy, Victoria
- Died: 20 September 1963 (aged 79); Kensington, Victoria
- Original team: Williamstown

Playing career^{1}
Years	Club	Games (Goals)
1910–11	St Kilda	12 (3)
- ^{1} Playing statistics correct to the end of 1911.

Harold Robert Monar (31 August 1884 – 20 September 1963) was an Australian rules footballer who played with St Kilda in the Victorian Football League (VFL).
