= Bruce Andrew (footballer, born 1936) =

Australian rules footballer

Personal information
- Full name: Bruce Andrew
- Born: 28 December 1936 (age 89)
- Original team: South Bendigo
- Height: 183 cm (6 ft 0 in)
- Weight: 76 kg (168 lb)

Playing career^{1}
Years	Club	Games (Goals)
1958	St Kilda	4 (1)
- ^{1} Playing statistics correct to the end of 1958.

Bruce Andrew (born 28 December 1936) is a former Australian rules footballer who played with St Kilda in the Victorian Football League (VFL).
