= David Winbanks =

Australian rules footballer

Personal information
- Full name: David Winbanks
- Born: 8 September 1962 (age 64)
- Original team: Oakleigh Districts
- Height: 193 cm (6 ft 4 in)
- Weight: 92 kg (203 lb)

Playing career^{1}
Years	Club	Games (Goals)
1981–1983	South Melbourne/Sydney	15 (2)
1984	St Kilda	2 (0)
Total		17 (2)
- ^{1} Playing statistics correct to the end of 1984.

David Winbanks (born 8 September 1962) is a former Australian rules footballer who played with the Sydney Swans and St Kilda in the Victorian Football League (VFL).

An Oakleigh Districts recruit, Winbanks played his football as a defender. He started at South Melbourne in 1981, then made the move to Sydney when the club relocated. In 1984 he switched to St Kilda, but made just two appearances.
