= Max Mollar =

Australian rules footballer

Personal information
- Full name: Max Mollar
- Born: 29 August 1929
- Died: 17 August 1977 (aged 47)
- Original team: Camden
- Height: 178 cm (5 ft 10 in)
- Weight: 70 kg (154 lb)
- Position: Utility

Playing career^{1}
Years	Club	Games (Goals)
1950–55	St Kilda	82 (5)
- ^{1} Playing statistics correct to the end of 1955.

Max Mollar (29 August 1929 – 17 August 1977) was a former Australian rules footballer who played with St Kilda in the Victorian Football League (VFL).
