= Bill Waldron =

Australian rules footballer

Personal information
- Full name: Bill Waldron
- Born: 11 February 1935 (age 91)
- Height: 183 cm (6 ft 0 in)
- Weight: 75 kg (165 lb)

Playing career^{1}
Years	Club	Games (Goals)
1956–57	St Kilda	9 (0)
- ^{1} Playing statistics correct to the end of 1957.

Bill Waldron (born 11 February 1935) is a former Australian rules footballer who played with St Kilda in the Victorian Football League (VFL).
