= Bill Paez =

Australian rules footballer, born 1912

Personal information
- Full name: William Barber Paez
- Born: 12 February 1912; South Melbourne, Victoria
- Died: 28 August 1982 (aged 70); Caulfield, Victoria
- Original team: Coleraine
- Height: 175 cm (5 ft 9 in)
- Weight: 68 kg (150 lb)

Playing career^{1}
Years	Club	Games (Goals)
1934	St Kilda	7 (1)
- ^{1} Playing statistics correct to the end of 1934.

William Barber Paez (12 February 1912 – 28 August 1982) was an Australian rules footballer who played with St Kilda in the Victorian Football League (VFL).
