= Harry Horsenail =

Australian rules footballer

Personal information
- Full name: Harold Henry Horsenail
- Born: 18 January 1892; Prahran, Victoria
- Died: 7 December 1969 (aged 77); Fitzroy, Victoria

Playing career^{1}
Years	Club	Games (Goals)
1914–15, 1918	St Kilda	6 (2)
- ^{1} Playing statistics correct to the end of 1918.

Harold Henry Horsenail (18 January 1892 – 7 December 1969) was an Australian rules footballer who played with St Kilda in the Victorian Football League (VFL).
