= Wally Gant =

Australian rules footballer

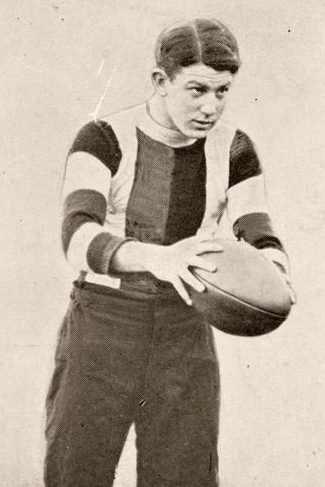
- Gant in 1910

Personal information
- Full name: Walter Gerald Gant
- Born: 7 July 1890; Melbourne
- Died: 31 May 1957 (aged 66); Western Cape, South Africa
- Original team: Melbourne Swimming Club
- Position: Halfback

Playing career^{1}
Years	Club	Games (Goals)
1908–11, 1914	St Kilda	49 (6)
- ^{1} Playing statistics correct to the end of 1914.

Walter Gerald Gant (7 July 1890 – 31 May 1957) was an Australian rules footballer who played with St Kilda in the Victorian Football League (VFL).
