= Ron Shields =

Australian rules footballer

Personal information
- Full name: Ron Shields
- Born: 2 March 1934 (age 92)
- Original team: Caulfield City
- Height: 185 cm (6 ft 1 in)
- Weight: 83 kg (183 lb)

Playing career^{1}
Years	Club	Games (Goals)
1954–55	St Kilda	11 (0)
- ^{1} Playing statistics correct to the end of 1955.

Ron Shields (born 2 March 1934) is a former Australian rules footballer who played with St Kilda in the Victorian Football League (VFL).
