= Wally Tuck =

Australian rules footballer

Personal information
- Full name: Wally Tuck
- Born: 12 August 1897
- Died: 17 November 1983 (aged 86)
- Original team: St Kilda District / Xavier College

Playing career^{1}
Years	Club	Games (Goals)
1919, 1921	St Kilda	18 (1)
- ^{1} Playing statistics correct to the end of 1921.

Wally Tuck (12 August 1897 – 17 November 1983) was an Australian rules footballer who played with St Kilda in the Victorian Football League (VFL).
