= Ray Gracie =

Australian rules footballer (1917–1998)

Personal information
- Full name: Ray Gracie
- Born: 1 September 1917
- Died: 15 March 1998 (aged 80)
- Original team: Melbourne Seconds / Prahran
- Height: 185 cm (6 ft 1 in)
- Weight: 86 kg (190 lb)

Playing career^{1}
Years	Club	Games (Goals)
1944	St Kilda	14 (8)
- ^{1} Playing statistics correct to the end of 1944.

Ray Gracie (1 September 1917 – 15 March 1998) was an Australian rules footballer who played with St Kilda in the Victorian Football League (VFL).
