= Ken Cockfield =

Australian rules footballer

Personal information
- Full name: Kenneth William Cockfield
- Born: 8 October 1928
- Died: 23 April 2001 (aged 72)
- Height: 174 cm (5 ft 9 in)
- Weight: 73 kg (161 lb)

Playing career^{1}
Years	Club	Games (Goals)
1949–53	St Kilda	26 (0)
- ^{1} Playing statistics correct to the end of 1953.

Kenneth William Cockfield (8 October 1928 – 23 April 2001) was an Australian rules footballer who played with St Kilda in the Victorian Football League (VFL).
