= Bill Coady =

Australian rules footballer

Personal information
- Full name: Edmond William Coady
- Born: 7 April 1939
- Died: 14 December 2015 (aged 76)
- Original team: Hampton Juniors
- Height: 185 cm (6 ft 1 in)
- Weight: 73 kg (161 lb)
- Position: Wing

Playing career^{1}
Years	Club	Games (Goals)
1959–63	St Kilda	70 (18)
- ^{1} Playing statistics correct to the end of 1963.

Edmond William Coady (7 April 1939 – 14 December 2015) was an Australian rules footballer who played with St Kilda in the Victorian Football League (VFL).
