= Peter Burns (footballer, born 1939) =

Australian rules footballer

Personal information
- Full name: Peter Burns
- Born: 26 May 1939
- Died: 12 February 2009 (aged 69)
- Original team: East Brighton
- Height: 175 cm (5 ft 9 in)
- Weight: 72 kg (159 lb)

Playing career^{1}
Years	Club	Games (Goals)
1959–60	St Kilda	4 (2)
- ^{1} Playing statistics correct to the end of 1960.

Peter Burns (26 May 1939 – 12 February 2009) was an Australian rules footballer who played with St Kilda in the Victorian Football League (VFL).
