= Danny Dunne =

Australian rules footballer

Personal information
- Full name: Daniel Dunne
- Born: 14 April 1876; Killarney, Victoria
- Died: 9 May 1919 (aged 43); Warrnambool, Victoria

Playing career^{1}
Years	Club	Games (Goals)
1897	St Kilda	13 (4)
- ^{1} Playing statistics correct to the end of 1897.

Danny Dunne (14 April 1876 – 9 May 1919) was an Australian rules footballer who played with St Kilda in the Victorian Football League (VFL).
