= Les Rowell =

Australian rules footballer

Personal information
- Full name: Leslie Edward Rowell
- Born: 22 October 1921
- Died: 13 August 2008 (aged 86)
- Original team: Prahran
- Height: 173 cm (5 ft 8 in)
- Weight: 68 kg (150 lb)

Playing career^{1}
Years	Club	Games (Goals)
1942–45	St Kilda	21 (9)
- ^{1} Playing statistics correct to the end of 1945.

Leslie Edward Rowell (22 October 1921 – 13 August 2008) was an Australian rules footballer who played with St Kilda in the Victorian Football League (VFL).
