= Pat Cunningham =

Australian rules footballer, born 1914

Personal information
- Full name: Pat Cunningham
- Born: 22 May 1914
- Died: 17 February 2005 (aged 90)
- Height: 179 cm (5 ft 10 in)
- Weight: 72 kg (159 lb)

Playing career^{1}
Years	Club	Games (Goals)
1942	St Kilda	1 (0)
- ^{1} Playing statistics correct to the end of 1942.

Pat Cunningham (22 May 1914 – 17 February 2005) was an Australian rules footballer who played with St Kilda in the Victorian Football League (VFL).
