= VX-6 =

Air Development Squadron Six
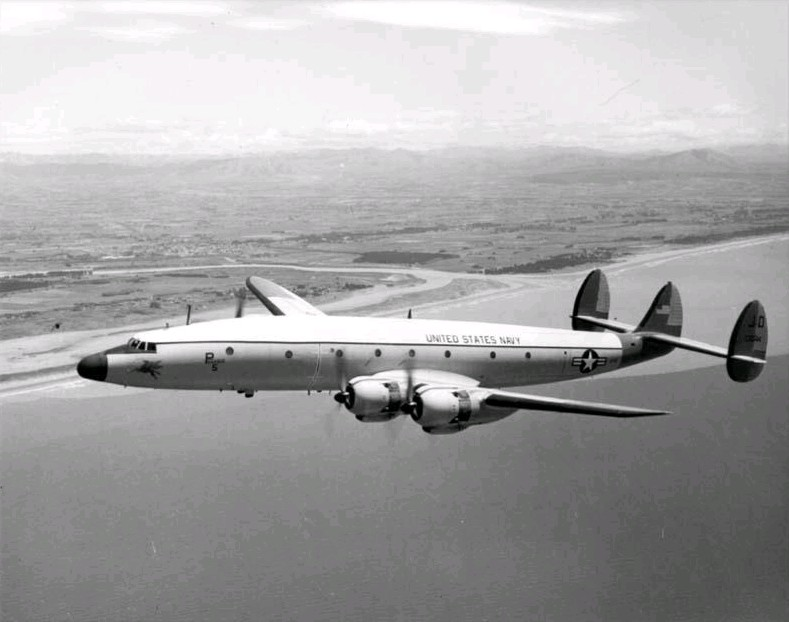
- A Lockheed C-121J Constellation of squadron VX-6 in flight near Christchurch on 27 November 1965. This aircraft, named "Pegasus", crashed at Williams Field, McMurdo Station on 8 October 1970. Pegasus Field is named after this aircraft.
- Active: 17 January 1955–31 March 1999
- Country: United States
- Branch: United States Navy
- Type: Test & Evaluation
- Role: logistical support
- Part of: Naval Air Systems Command
- Garrison/HQ: Naval Air Station Quonset Point
- Nickname(s): "puckered penguins"
- Colors: Tail code XD (1955–1957); Tail code JD (1957–1969)

Commanders
- Commanding officers: CDR Edward M. Ward, 1955–57 CDR Vernon J. Coley, 1957–58; CAPT William H. Munson, 1959–61; CDR George R. Kelly, 1964; CDR F.S. Gallup Jr, 1965; CDR Marion Morris, 1966; CDR Daniel Balish, 1967 CDR Arthur F. Schneider, 1968
- Officer in Charge, winter detachment: CDR Gordon K. Ebbe, June 1955–June 1956 LCDR Charles J. McCarthy, Ellsworth Station detachment, 1957–58; LCDR John K. Allison, 1959; LCDR Louis L. Helms, 1961; LCDR John A. Morton, 1964; LCDR William E. Shockley, 1966 LCDR David B. Eldridge Jr., 1967

Aircraft flown
- Reconnaissance: P2V-2 Neptune, DHC-3 Otter
- Transport: R4D Dakota, R5D Skymaster, LC-130 Hercules

Air Development Squadron Six (VX-6 or AIRDEVRON SIX, commonly referred to by its nickname, "puckered penguins") was a United States Navy Air Development Squadron based at McMurdo Station, Antarctica. Established at Naval Air Station Patuxent River, Maryland on 17 January 1955, the squadron's mission was to conduct operations in support of Operation Deep Freeze, the operational component of the United States Antarctic Program.

Using the tail code XD, the squadron flew numerous fixed-wing aircraft and helicopters over the course of its existence—many of which were pioneering endeavors. For example, the first air link between Antarctica and New Zealand was established by men and aircraft of VX-6 in 1955. The following year, a ski-equipped R4D Dakota of VX-6 became the first aircraft to land at the South Pole. In 1961, the first emergency midwinter medical evacuation flight was conducted from Byrd Station to Christchurch. In 1963, an LC-130F Hercules of VX-6 made the longest flight in Antarctic history. In 1967, a United States Navy LC-130F of VX-6 completed the first scheduled winter flight to Antarctica, landing at Williams Field.

VX-6 changed the tail code of its aircraft to JD in 1957, and was redesignated as Antarctic Development Squadron Six (VXE-6) on 1 January 1969. Over the first 14-years of its existence during the time it was designated VX-6, seventeen sailors and marines assigned died in Antarctica during Operation Deep Freeze missions.

== History ==
VX-6 traces its roots to Operation Highjump (1946–1947), the fourth Antarctic expedition conducted by United States Navy Rear Admiral Richard Evelyn Byrd. That expedition set out in December 1946 to conduct an extensive aerial survey of Antarctica, using Martin PBM Mariners based in the pack ice of the Ross Sea, as well as land-based R4D Dakotas (Dakota, from the acronym "DACoTA" for Douglas Aircraft Company Transport Aircraft, was the designation used by the United States Navy to refer to the Douglas C-47 Skytrain). By the time Operation Highjump was concluded in late February 1947, the team had mapped about 5,500 miles (8,900 km) of coastline and 1,500,000 square miles (3,900,000 km^{2}) of the interior of the continent.

VX-6 was one of six air development squadrons formed by the United States Navy beginning in 1946 to develop and evaluate aircraft tactics and techniques. These squadrons were initially directed by the Operational Development Force, which was redesignated in May 1959 as the Operational Test and Evaluation Force (OPTEVFOR). These six squadrons were initially designated as VX-1 (tail code XA), VX-2 (tail code XB), VX-3 (tail code XC), VX-4 (tail code XF), VX-5 (tail code XE) and VX-6 (tail code XD). On 1 January 1969, the surviving Air Development Squadrons (VX-1, VX-4, VX-5 and VX-6) became Air Test and Evaluation Squadrons. Their designations were changed to VXE-1, VXE-4, VXE-5 and VXE-6. Their tail codes of these squadrons were changed to JA, JF, JE and JD, respectively.

=== Operation Deep Freeze I and II ===
Air Development Squadron Six (VX-6) was formally established on 17 January 1955 at Naval Air Station Patuxent River, Maryland. The squadron's mission was to conduct aviation operations in support of United States Department of Defense responsibilities in connection with the United States Antarctic Program. On 1 February, Task Force 43 was activated to plan Antarctic operations scheduled to begin in the fall under the code name Operation Deep Freeze, with Captain George J. Dufek as commanding officer. Dufek would remain as commanding officer through Operation Deep Freeze IV, which concluded in 1959. The mission of Task Force 43 was to provide all the logistical support necessary for the successful U.S. participation in the upcoming International Geophysical Year (1957–8). More specifically, this meant that Task Force 43 was responsible for the construction of airstrips and iceports and the establishment of bases on Antarctica that would enable scientists to conduct geophysical studies upon that continent. On 14 November, the flagship of the recently promoted RADM Dufek, Commander Task Force 43, steamed from Naval Station Norfolk, Virginia to rendezvous in New Zealand with other ships of the task force for the onward voyage to Antarctica.

VX-6 made its first deployment at that time as part of Task Force 43 (the logistics arm of Operation Deep Freeze). That first season, VX-6 completed nine long-range exploratory flights. The squadron also transported people and materials necessary for the construction of Little America Base Camp, the Naval Air Operations Facility on Hut Point Peninsula (Ross Island), the first South Pole Station (now referred to as "Old Pole"), and assisted in the establishment of four other bases on the continent. On 20 December 1955, two Lockheed P2V-2 Neptunes and two R5D Skymasters (R5D was the designation used by the United States Navy to refer to the Douglas C-54 Skymaster) established the first air link between Antarctica and New Zealand with a flight from Christchurch to McMurdo Station.

Following its return from Operation Deep Freeze I in February 1956, VX-6 was relocated to Naval Air Station Quonset Point, Rhode Island. Naval Construction Battalion Center Davisville, the site of manufacture of the first Quonset huts, was also located at Quonset Point. NCBC Davisville was the home of Naval Construction Battalion 200, which had been established to perform the construction of any facilities required by the United States Antarctic Program. In September of that year, LCDR Ray E. Hall drew the first rendition of "Puckered Pete", a cartoon character which later became the unofficial mascot of VX-6.

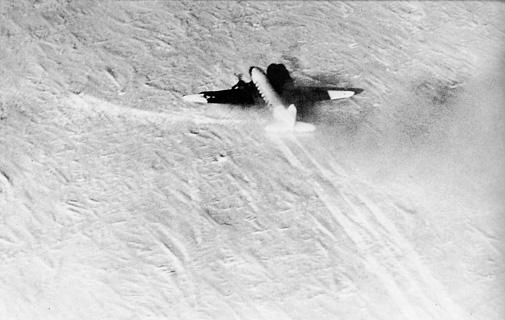
The R4D-5L "Que Sera Sera" landing at South Pole on 31 October 1956.

On 31 October 1956, during Operation Deep Freeze II, Qué Será Será, a ski-equipped R4D Dakota piloted by LCDR Conrad S. Shinn, became the first plane to land at the South Pole. The seven United States Navy men (RADM George J. Dufek, CAPT Douglas L. Cordiner, CAPT William M. Hawkes, LCDR Conrad S. Shinn, LT John R. Swadener, AD2 John P. Strider, and AT2 William A. Cumbie Jr.) aboard that aircraft were the first to stand at this spot in 44 years, the last being Robert Falcon Scott's ill-fated Terra Nova Expedition in January 1912. RADM Dufek had chosen LCDR Shinn and his flight crew to attempt the landing, which was an extraordinary undertaking since the South Pole was almost 10,000 feet (3,000 m) above sea level where the aircraft engines would operate considerably below their optimum power levels. In addition it was expected that extremely cold conditions could be expected on the surface. The landing party remained at the South Pole for only 49 minutes, setting up navigational aids to assist the future delivery of materials and equipment for constructing a scientific observation station at the spot. Also in 1956, an R4D Dakota delivered the first group of 11 Seabees and 11 dog sleds, together with tents and other equipment to the South Pole, to begin construction of the first South Pole Station.

=== 1957–1969 ===
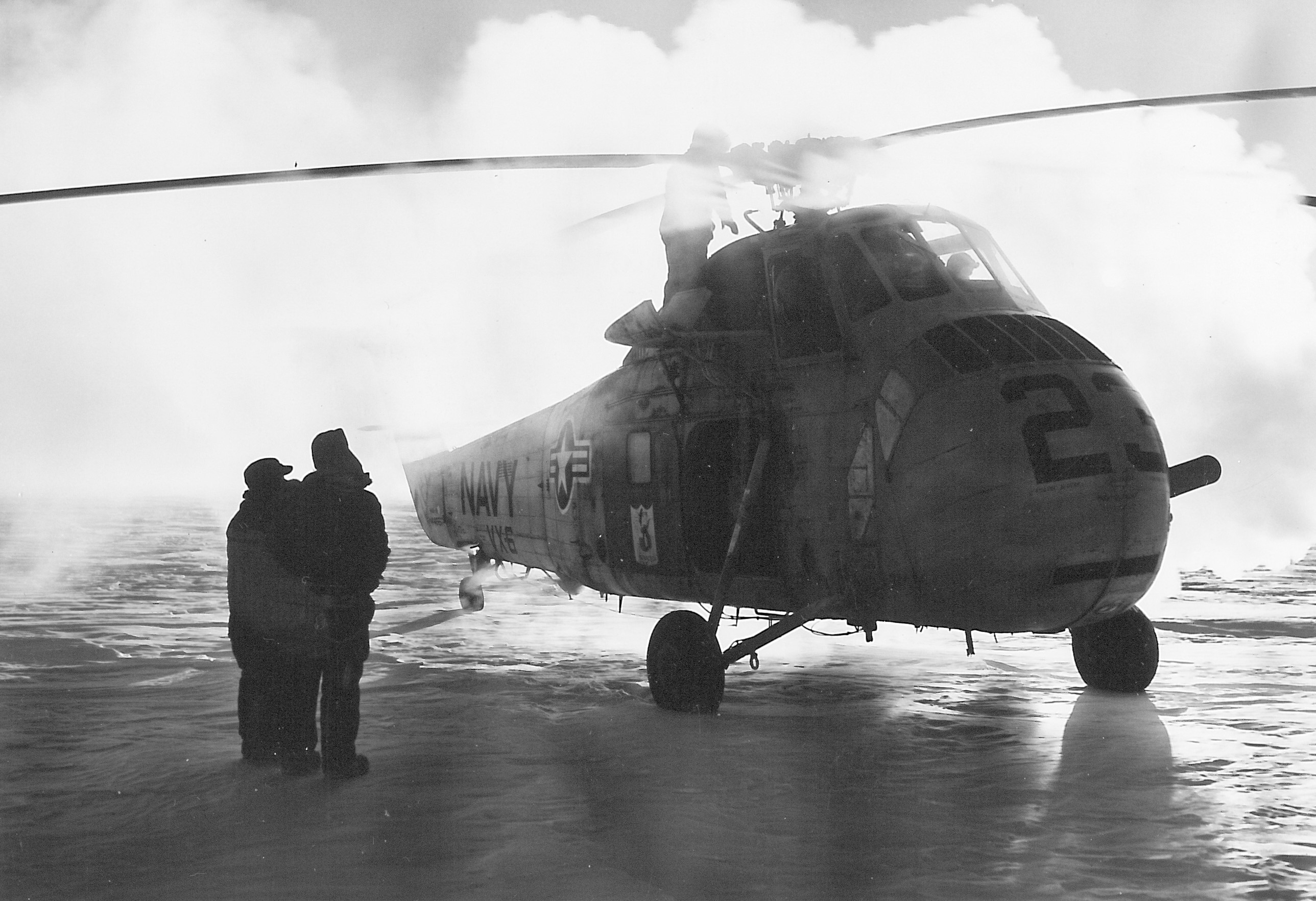
A VX-6 helicopter gets checked while on the ice barrier as passengers observe, 2 April 1960.

In 1957, the first letter of all the east-coast-based VX squadrons, including VX-6, was changed from X to J. In January 1958, a VX-6 UC-1 Otter made the first wheels-on-dirt landing in Antarctica at Marble Point. On 1 October 1959, RADM David M. Tyree (Commander, U.S. Naval Support Force Antarctica from 14 April 1959–26 November 1962) arrived at Naval Air Facility McMurdo Station from Christchurch aboard an R5D Skymaster piloted by LCDR J. A. Henning of VX-6. This first flight of the season marked the operational implementation of Operation Deep Freeze V.

On 9–10 April 1961, the first midwinter medical evacuation flight was conducted to rescue Leonid Kuperov, a seriously ill Soviet scientist, from Byrd Station. Two VX-6 C-130BL Hercules from Quonset Point flew from to Christchurch. One (piloted by CDR Lloyd E. Newcomer) then flew on to Byrd Station to pick up Kuperov, while the other stood by in Christchurch. The total distance flown during this rescue mission was just under 13000 miles.

On 22 February 1963, an LC-130F Hercules of VX-6 made the longest flight in Antarctic history, covering territory never before seen by man. The plane (piloted by CDR William H. Everett and carrying RADM James R. Reedy (Commander, U.S. Naval Support Force Antarctica from November 1962–April 1965) among its passengers, made the 3,470-mile (5,580 km) flight from McMurdo Station, beyond the South Pole to the Shackleton Range and then southeastward to the pole of inaccessibility before returning to McMurdo Station; the duration of this journey was 10 hours and 40 minutes. Also in February 1963, VX-6 completed the first delivery of bulk fuel by a Lockheed LC-130 Hercules.

On 26 June 1964, an LC-130F Hercules, commanded by LT Robert V. Mayer of VX-6, completed a round-trip flight from Christchurch to Antarctica in an emergency evacuation of petty officer B. L. McMullen, critically injured in a fall. As in the earlier medical evacuation of 1961, two planes, with teams of medical specialists on board, flew from NAS Quonset Point to Christchurch where one plane stood by while the other undertook the hazardous flight. On 30 September 1964, three LC-130 Hercules aircraft of VX-6 took off from Melbourne, Christchurch and Punta Arenas, respectively. The three aircraft flew to Antarctica, landing on Williams Field, 7 miles (11 km) from McMurdo Station. The flight from Melbourne, the first in history from Australia to Antarctica, passed over the South Pole to drop a 50-pound sack of mail to the wintering-over party, then landed at Byrd Station before proceeding to McMurdo Station. The arrival of RADM Reedy on this flight marked the official opening of Operation Deep Freeze 1965. Also in 1964, VX-6 conducted the first flight from Cape Town, South Africa to McMurdo Station, the first flight of a U.S. aircraft to the Soviet Vostok Station, and the first successful demonstration of trimetrogon aerial photography, used extensively to map Antarctica.

On 7 June 1966, a C-130 Hercules, piloted by CDR Marion Morris of VX-6, returned to Christchurch after a flight to McMurdo Station to evacuate UT-2 Robert L. Mayfield, who had been critically injured in a fall. It was the third emergency air evacuation from Antarctica during the winter night.

On 18 June 1967, The first scheduled winter flight to Antarctica was successfully completed when a United States Navy LC-130F of VX-6 flying from Christchurch landed at Williams Field. Although earlier winter flights had been made to Antarctica as a result of medical emergencies, this was the first planned flight. On 2 December 1967, an LC-117D Skytrooper landed at McMurdo Station from Hallett Station. This was the last C-117 flight on the Antarctic continent, marking the end of 11 years of service to VX-6 by the Douglas C-47 Skytrain airframe.

On 1 January 1969, VX-6 was redesignated as Antarctic Development Squadron Six (VXE-6).

== Aircraft ==
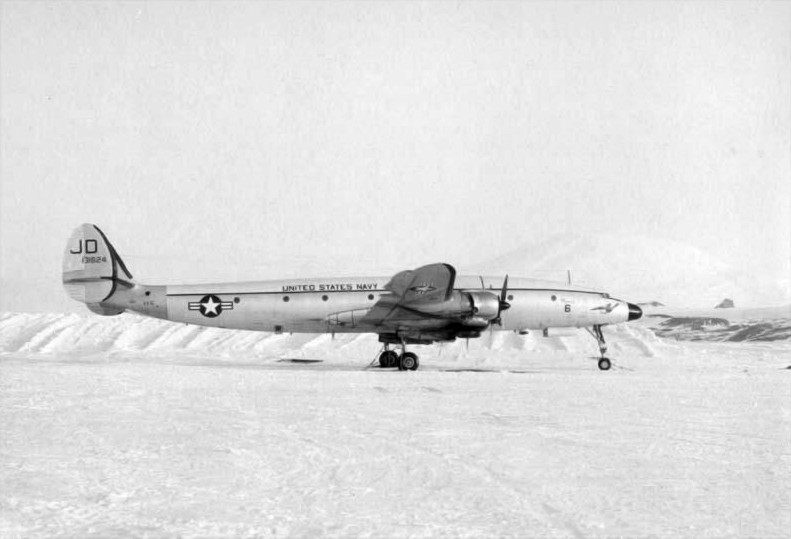
A United States Navy Lockheed C-121J Constellation of squadron VX-6 at Williams Field, McMurdo Station, on 1 November 1964

In support of Operation Deep Freeze, the squadron operated a variety of aircraft throughout the course of its existence. Fixed-wing aircraft included the Grumman UF-1L Albatross, UC-1 Otter, Douglas Skytrain (R4D Dakota and C-47 models), Douglas Skymaster (R5D and C-54 models), Lockheed Neptune (P2V-2 and P2V-7 models), Lockheed Constellation (R7D and R7V models), and the Lockheed LC-130 Hercules. The ski-equipped LC-130 Hercules, whose long range and heavy load capability significantly increased the capabilities of the unit, was introduced during Operation Deep Freeze 1961. Helicopters included the Sikorsky Seahorse (HUS-1A and HUS-1L models), and the Sikorsky HO4S-3.

== Aviation accidents and incidents ==
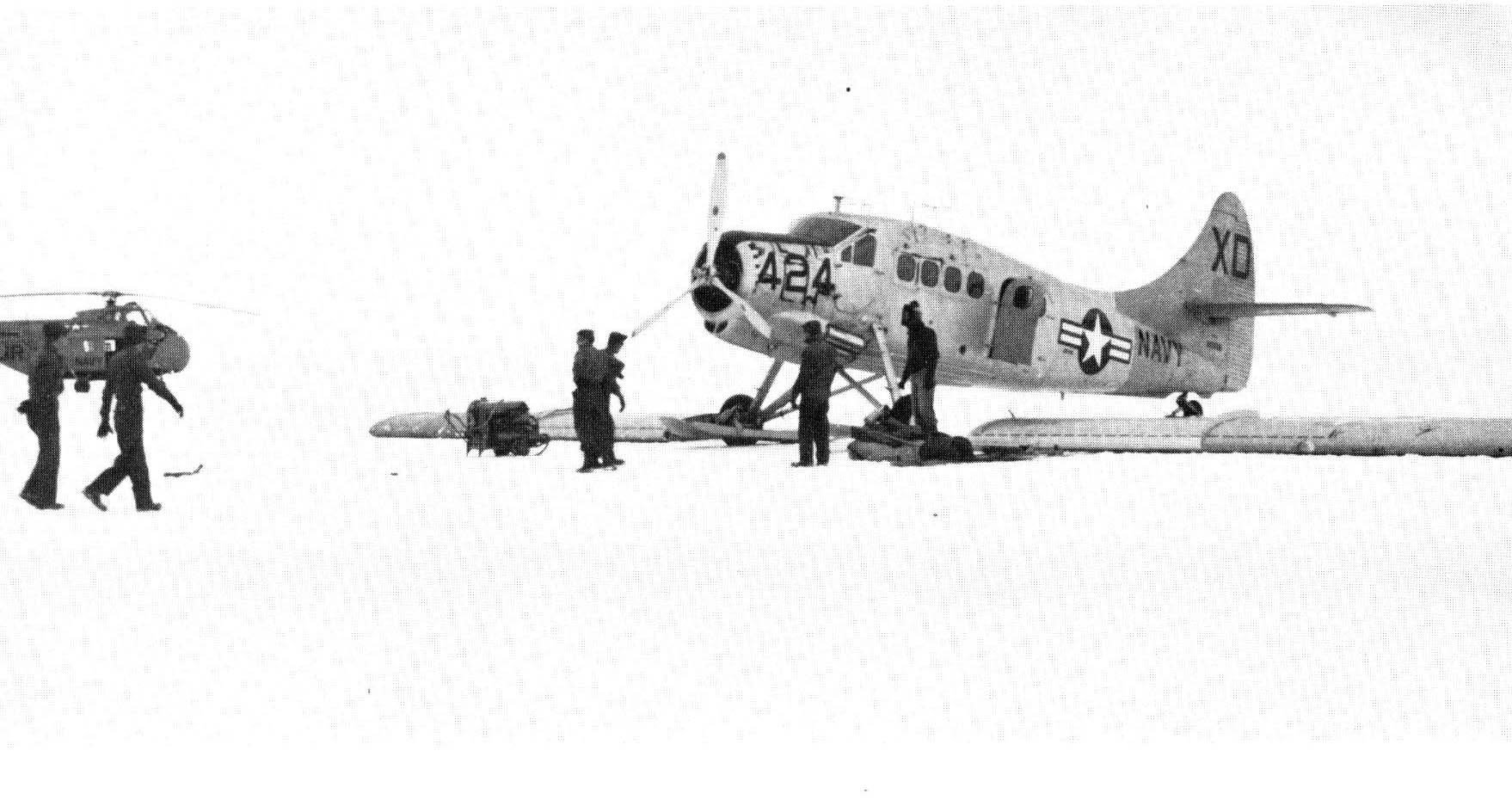
VX-6 crew members assembling a United States Navy UC-1 Otter aircraft at McMurdo Station. The XD tail code is clearly visible. This aircraft crashed on takeoff near Cape Bird, Ross Island, on 2 December 1955. Note the HO4S-3 in the left background.

Seventeen sailors and marines assigned to VX-6 died in Antarctica in support of Operation Deep Freeze.

On 18 October 1956, a P2V-2 Neptune crashed at McMurdo Station during a landing in whiteout conditions, killing David W. Carey, Rayburn A. Hudman, Marion O. Marze, and Charles S. Miller.

On 12 July 1957, an HO4S-3 crashed in the vicinity of McMurdo Station during austral winter, killing Nelson R. Cole.

On 4 January 1959, a UC-1 Otter crashed on takeoff at Marble Point, killing Harvey E. Gardner and Lawrence J. Farrell.

On 9 November 1961, a P2V-7 crashed on takeoff from Wilkes Station, killing William D. Counts, Romuald P. Compton, William W. Chastain, James L. Gray and passenger geologist Dr. Edward C. Thiel.

On 2 February 1966, a LC-47J crashed on Ross Ice Shelf during takeoff, killing Ronald Rosenthal, Harold M. Morris, William D. Fordell, Richard S. Simmons, Wayne M. Shattuck, and Charles C. Kelley.

== See also ==
- Mount VX-6
- VX-9
- VX-20
- VX-23
- VX-30
- VX-31
