= VXE-6 =

United States Navy Air Test and Evaluation Squadron

Antarctic Development Squadron Six
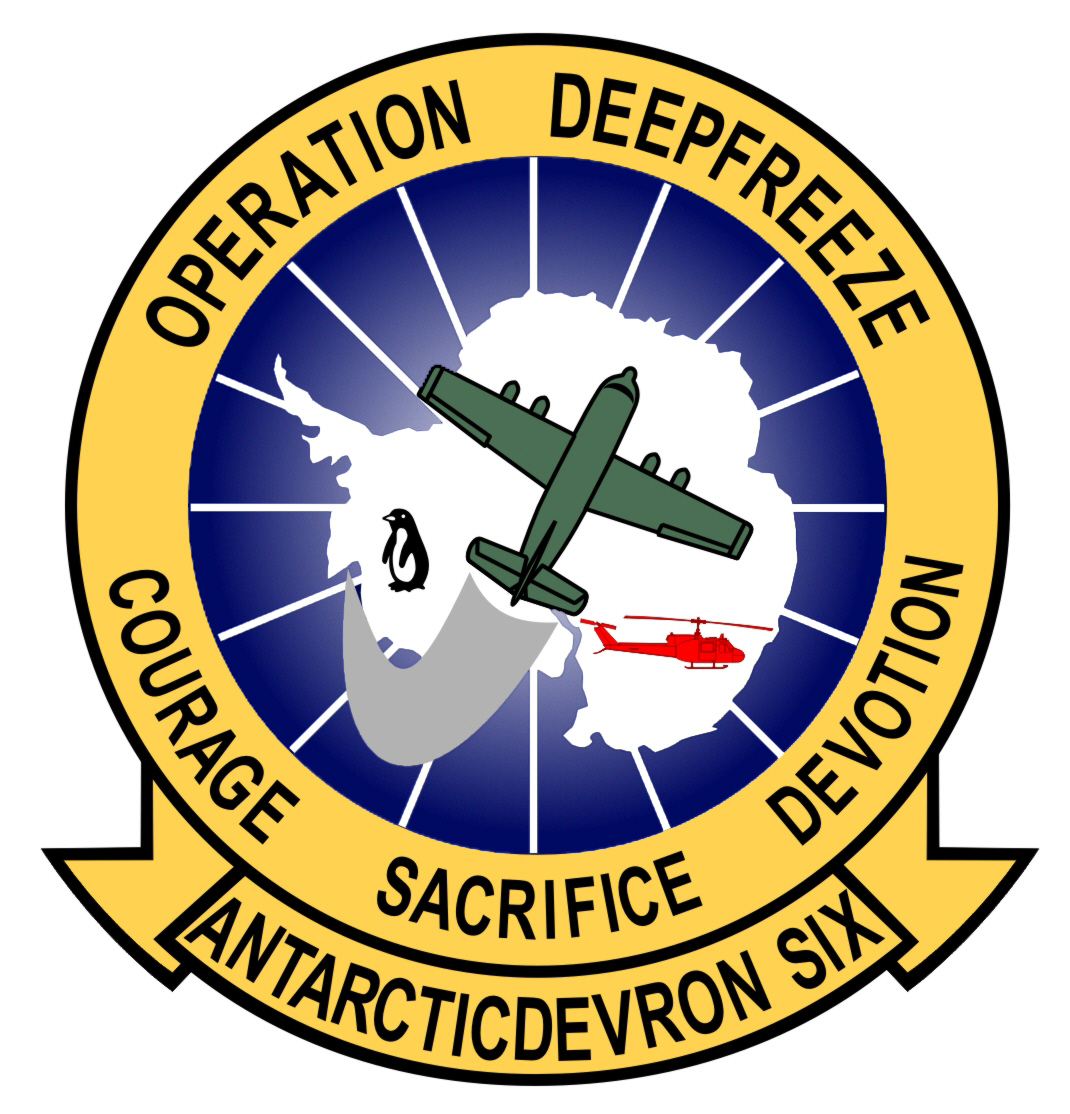
- Insignia of Antarctic Development Squadron Six (VXE-6)
- Active: 17 January 1955 – 31 March 1999
- Country: United States
- Branch: United States Navy
- Type: Test & Evaluation
- Role: logistical support
- Part of: Naval Air Systems Command
- Garrison/HQ: Naval Air Station Point Mugu
- Nickname: "The Puckered Penguins"
- Mottos: "Courage, Sacrifice, Devotion"
- Colors: Tail code JD XD

Commanders
- Commanding officers: CDR Edward M. Ward, 1955–57 CDR Vernon J. Coley, 1957–58; CAPT William H. Munson, 1959–61; CDR George R. Kelly, 1964; CDR F.S. Gallup Jr, 1965; CDR Daniel Balish, 1967 CDR Arthur F. Schneider, 1968
- Officer in Charge, winter detachment: CDR Gordon K. Ebbe, June 1955–June 1956 LCDR Charles J. McCarthy, Ellsworth Station detachment, 1957–58; LCDR John K. Allison, 1959; LCDR Louis L. Helms, 1961; LCDR John A. Morton, 1964; LCDR William E. Shockley, 1966 LCDR David B. Eldridge Jr., 1967
- Commanding officers: CDR Eugene W. Van Reeth, 1969 CDR Claude H. Nordhill, 1972; CDR John B. Dana, 1973; CDR Vernon W. Peters, 1974; CDR Fred C. Holt, 1975; CDR Daniel A. Desko, 1976; CDR James W. Jaeger, 1977; CDR William A. Morgan, 1978–1979; CDR Victor Louis Pesce, 1979–1980; CDR Paul R. Dykeman, 1980–1981; CDR Dwight D. Fisher, 1984–1985; CDR Paul Derocher, 1985–1986; CDR Joseph D. Mazza, 1986–1987 CDR Jack B. Rector, 1987–1988; CDR Jack Smith, 1988–1989; CDR Stephen Gardner, 1994–1995; CDR John Morin, 1995-96 CDR William Stedman, 1996-97 CDR William Warlick, 1997–1998 CDR Dave Jackson, 1998–1999

Aircraft flown
- Reconnaissance: P2V-2 Neptune, DHC-3 Otter
- Transport: R4D Dakota, R5D Skymaster, LC-130 Hercules

Antarctic Development Squadron Six (VXE-6 or ANTARCTIC DEVRON SIX, commonly referred to by its nickname, The Puckered Penguins) was a United States Navy air test and evaluation squadron based at Naval Air Station Point Mugu, California with forward operating bases at Christchurch, New Zealand, and McMurdo Station, Antarctica.

Established at Naval Air Station Patuxent River, Maryland on 17 January 1955 as Air Development Squadron Six (VX-6), the squadron's mission was to conduct operations in support of Operation Deep Freeze, the operational component of the United States Antarctic Program. The squadron relocated to Naval Air Station Quonset Point, Rhode Island on 1 February 1956. On 1 January 1969, the squadron was redesignated Antarctic Development Squadron Six (VXE-6).

Following the closure of NAS Quonset Point in the 1970s, the squadron relocated to NAS Point Mugu. Using the tail codes XD (1955) and JD (1957), the squadron flew numerous aircraft throughout its existence—many of which were pioneering endeavors. For example, the first air link between Antarctica and New Zealand was established by men and aircraft of VX-6 in 1955. The following year, a ski-equipped R4D Dakota of VX-6 became the first aircraft to land at the South Pole. In 1961, the first emergency midwinter medical evacuation flight was conducted from Byrd Station to Christchurch. In 1963, an LC-130F Hercules of VX-6 made the longest flight in Antarctic history. In 1967, a United States Navy LC-130F of VX-6 completed the first scheduled winter flight to Antarctica, landing at Williams Field.

Following the closure of austral summer operations at Amundsen–Scott South Pole Station in February 1999, the squadron returned to Naval Air Station Point Mugu, California, where it was disestablished on 31 March 1999. Beginning in 1997, responsibility for long-range logistical support of Operation Deep Freeze had been transferred from the VXE-6 squadron to the 109th Airlift Wing of the New York Air National Guard (NYANG).

== History ==
VX-6 traces its roots to Operation Highjump (1946–1947), the fourth Antarctic expedition conducted by United States Navy Rear Admiral Richard Evelyn Byrd. That expedition set out in December 1946 to conduct an extensive aerial survey of Antarctica, using Martin PBM Mariners based in the pack ice of the Ross Sea, as well as land-based R4D Dakotas (Dakota, from the acronym "DACoTA" for Douglas Aircraft Company Transport Aircraft, was the designation used by the United States Navy to refer to the Douglas C-47 Skytrain). By the time Operation Highjump was concluded in late February 1947, the team had mapped about 5,500 miles (8,900 km) of coastline and 1,500,000 square miles (3,900,000 km^{2}) of the interior of the continent.

=== Operation Deep Freeze I and II ===
On 1 February, Task Force 43 was activated to plan Antarctic operations scheduled to begin in the fall under the code name Operation Deep Freeze, with Captain George J. Dufek as commanding officer. Dufek would remain as commanding officer through Operation Deep Freeze IV, which concluded in 1959. The mission of Task Force 43 was to provide all the logistical support necessary for the successful U.S. participation in the upcoming International Geophysical Year (1957–8). More specifically, this meant that Task Force 43 was responsible for the construction of airstrips and iceports and the establishment of bases on Antarctica that would enable scientists to conduct geophysical studies upon that continent. On 14 November, the flagship of the recently promoted RADM Dufek, Commander Task Force 43, steamed from Naval Station Norfolk, Virginia to rendezvous in New Zealand with other ships of the task force for the onward voyage to Antarctica.

VX-6 made its first deployment at that time as part of Task Force 43 (the logistics arm of Operation Deep Freeze). That first season, VX-6 completed nine long-range exploratory flights. The squadron also transported people and materials necessary for the construction of Little America Base Camp, the Naval Air Operations Facility on Hut Point Peninsula (Ross Island), the first South Pole Station (now referred to as "Old Pole"), and assisted in the establishment of four other bases on the continent. On 20 December 1955, two Lockheed P2V-2 Neptunes and two R5D Skymasters (R5D was the designation used by the United States Navy to refer to the Douglas C-54 Skymaster) established the first air link between Antarctica and New Zealand with a flight from Christchurch to McMurdo Station.

Following its return from Operation Deep Freeze I in February 1956, VX-6 was relocated to Naval Air Station Quonset Point, Rhode Island. Naval Construction Battalion Center Davisville, the site of manufacture of the first Quonset huts, was also located at Quonset Point. NCBC Davisville was the home of Naval Construction Battalion 200, which had been established to perform the construction of any facilities required by the United States Antarctic Program. In September of that year, LCDR Ray E. Hall drew the first rendition of "Puckered Pete", a cartoon character which later became the unofficial mascot of VX-6.

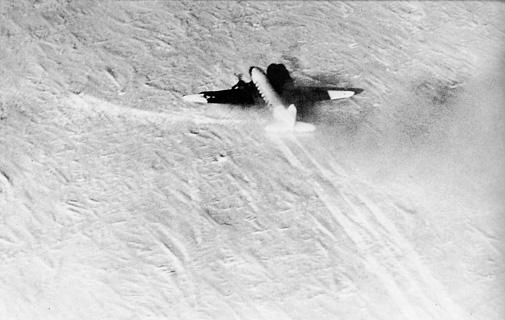
The R4D-5L "Que Sera Sera" lands at South Pole on 31 October 1956.

On 31 October 1956, during Operation Deep Freeze II, Qué Será Será, a ski-equipped R4D Dakota piloted by LCDR Conrad S. Shinn, became the first plane to land at the South Pole. The seven United States Navy men (RADM George J. Dufek, CAPT Douglas L. Cordiner, CAPT William M. Hawkes, LCDR Conrad S. Shinn, LT John R. Swadener, AD2 John P. Strider, and AT2 William A. Cumbie Jr.) aboard that aircraft were the first to stand at this spot in 44 years, the last being Robert Falcon Scott's ill-fated Terra Nova Expedition in January 1912. RADM Dufek had chosen LCDR Shinn and his flight crew to attempt the landing, which was an extraordinary undertaking since the South Pole was almost 10,000 feet (3,000 m) above sea level where the aircraft engines would operate considerably below their optimum power levels. In addition it was expected that extremely cold conditions could be expected on the surface. The landing party remained at the South Pole for only 49 minutes, setting up navigational aids to assist the future delivery of materials and equipment for constructing a scientific observation station at the spot. Also in 1956, an R4D Dakota delivered the first group of 11 Seabees and 11 dog sleds, together with tents and other equipment to the South Pole, to begin construction of the first South Pole Station.

=== 1957–1969 ===
In January 1958, a VX-6 UC-1 Otter made the first wheels-on-dirt landing in Antarctica at Marble Point. On 1 October 1959, RADM David M. Tyree (Commander, U.S. Naval Support Force Antarctica from 14 April 1959–26 November 1962) arrived at Naval Air Facility McMurdo Station from Christchurch aboard an R5D Skymaster piloted by LCDR J. A. Henning of VX-6. This first flight of the season marked the operational implementation of Operation Deep Freeze V.

On 9–10 April 1961, the first midwinter medical evacuation flight was conducted to rescue Leonid Kuperov, a seriously ill Soviet scientist, from Byrd Station. Two VX-6 C-130BL Hercules from Quonset Point flew from to Christchurch. One (piloted by CDR Lloyd E. Newcomer) then flew on to Byrd Station to pick up Kuperov, while the other stood by in Christchurch. The total distance flown during this rescue mission was just under 13000 miles.

On 22 February 1963, an LC-130F Hercules of VX-6 made the longest flight in Antarctic history, covering territory never before seen by man. The plane (piloted by CDR William H. Everett and carrying RADM James R. Reedy (Commander, U.S. Naval Support Force Antarctica from November 1962–April 1965) among its passengers, made the 3,470-mile (5,580 km) flight from McMurdo Station, beyond the South Pole to the Shackleton Range and then southeastward to the pole of inaccessibility before returning to McMurdo Station; the duration of this journey was 10 hours and 40 minutes. Also in February 1963, VX-6 completed the first delivery of bulk fuel by a Lockheed LC-130 Hercules.

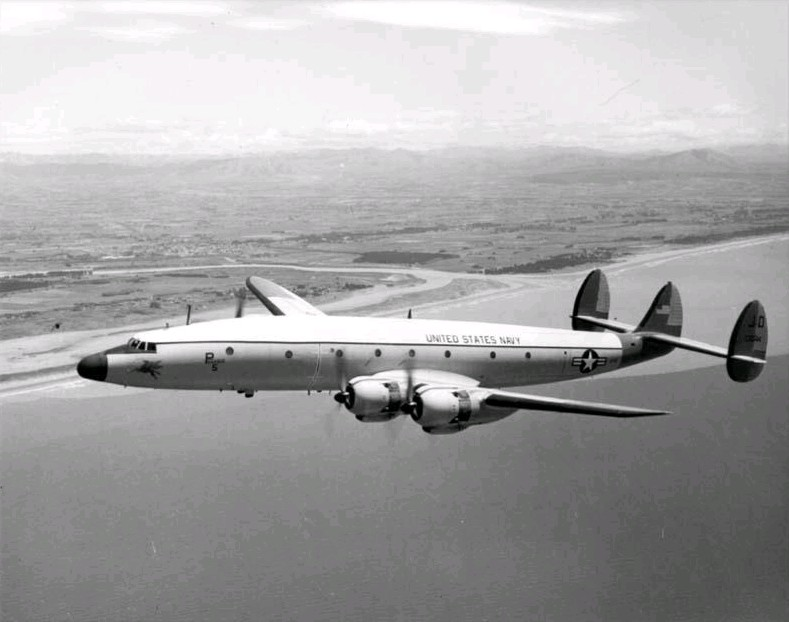
The Lockheed C-121J Constellation of squadron VX-6 flies near Christchurch on 27 November 1965. This aircraft, named "Pegasus", crashed at Williams Field, McMurdo Station on 8 October 1970. Pegasus Field is named after this aircraft.

On 26 June 1964, an LC-130F Hercules, commanded by LT Robert V. Mayer of VX-6, completed a round-trip flight from Christchurch to Antarctica in an emergency evacuation of petty officer B. L. McMullen, critically injured in a fall. As in the earlier medical evacuation of 1961, two planes, with teams of medical specialists on board, flew from NAS Quonset Point to Christchurch where one plane stood by while the other undertook the hazardous flight. On 30 September 1964, three LC-130 Hercules aircraft of VX-6 took off from Melbourne, Christchurch and Punta Arenas, respectively. The three aircraft flew to Antarctica, landing on Williams Field, 7 miles (11 km) from McMurdo Station. The flight from Melbourne, the first in history from Australia to Antarctica, passed over the South Pole to drop a 50-pound sack of mail to the wintering-over party, then landed at Byrd Station before proceeding to McMurdo Station. The arrival of RADM Reedy on this flight marked the official opening of Operation Deep Freeze 1965. Also in 1964, VX-6 conducted the first flight from Cape Town, South Africa to McMurdo Station, the first flight of a U.S. aircraft to the Soviet Vostok Station, and the first successful demonstration of trimetrogon aerial photography, used extensively to map Antarctica.

On 7 June 1966, a C-130 Hercules, piloted by CDR Marion Morris of VX-6, returned to Christchurch after a flight to McMurdo Station to evacuate UT-2 Robert L. Mayfield, who had been critically injured in a fall. It was the third emergency air evacuation from Antarctica during the winter night.

On 18 June 1967, The first scheduled winter flight to Antarctica was successfully completed when a United States Navy LC-130F of VX-6 flying from Christchurch landed at Williams Field. Although earlier winter flights had been made to Antarctica as a result of medical emergencies, this was the first planned flight. On 2 December 1967, an LC-117D Skytrooper landed at McMurdo Station from Hallett Station. This was the last C-117 flight on the Antarctic continent, marking the end of 11 years of service to VX-6 by the Douglas C-47 Skytrain airframe.

On 1 January 1969, VX-6 was redesignated Antarctic Development Squadron Six (VXE-6). On 31 August 1969, two LC-130 Hercules aircraft of VXE-6 arrived at McMurdo Station, 6 weeks in advance of the opening of Operation Deep Freeze 70. Among the passengers were Rear Admiral David F. Welch, Commander U.S. Naval Support Force Antarctica (NSFA) and seven scientists.

=== 1970s ===
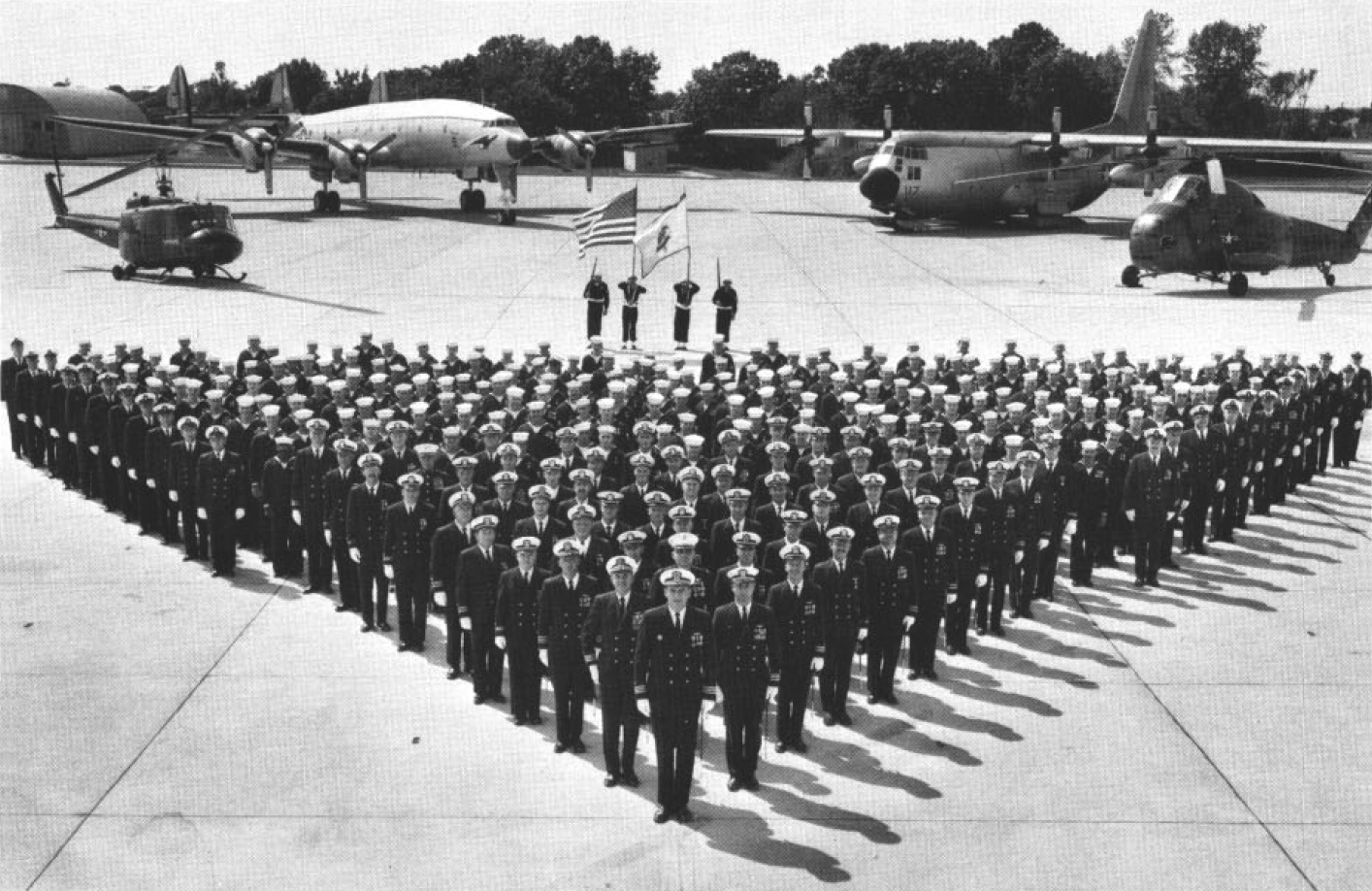
VXE-6 personnel and aircraft in 1970

1975 marked the end of an accident-free era for the Puckered Pete squadron. On 15 January 1975, two days before the 20th anniversary of its commissioning, VXE-6 lost a plane - BUNO 148319. "319" made a forced landing on the ice after a JATO bottle exploded on take-off which destroyed the aircraft's right wing. BUNO 159129 was flown in to rescue the 319 crew and passengers on 15 January 1975. Upon takeoff, the nose ski collapsed while trying to takeoff, 600 miles from McMurdo station. Both aircraft were Antarctica landmarks until they were recovered in 1977.

In 1975, CDR Fred C. Holt (12/7/1935-10/26/2020, Columbus GA) assumed command of the squadron from CDR Vernon Peters. RADM Jim Stockdale was present at the change of command ceremony. CDR Holt's wife, Sue, stated that "Admiral Stockdale is the only person I ever gave up my bed for" when he stayed at the Holt residence the night before the COC. CDR Holt enjoyed working with his squadron mates and remarked that his time on the ice was one of the best tours he experienced in his 21-year Navy career.

On During Operation Deep Freeze 1978, VXE-6 evacuated five critically injured Soviets from the crash site of an IL-14 Crate transport aircraft at Molodyozhnaya Station on the southern shore of Alasheyev Bight in the Cosmonauts Sea. This trip was 1,825 miles round trip from McMurdo Station.

On 28 November 1979, Air New Zealand Flight 901 (TE 901) crashed into Mount Erebus, killing all 257 on board. Three hours later, VXE-6 initiated the search and rescue effort (referred to as Operation Overdue), sending an LC-130R Hercules (XD-01, BuNo 160741, c/n 4731) and two UH-1N Huey helicopters from McMurdo Station to search the area of the last known position of TE 901 (approximately 38 miles true north of McMurdo Station). These aircraft were joined a half-hour later, at 4:16pm by six more aircraft launched from McMurdo Station. No survivors could be seen. At around 9:00 am, twenty hours after the crash, helicopters with search parties managed to land on the side of the mountain. The search parties confirmed that the wreckage was from Air New Zealand Flight 901, and that there were no survivors. In June 2009, Fifteen U.S. citizens were presented the New Zealand Special Service Medal(Erebus) for their work in the body recovery, victim identification and crash investigation phases of Operation Overdue, and resulting from the TE 901 crash. Those receiving the medal included LCDR Reedy Buford, CDR William Andre Coltrin, CDR Paul Richard Dykeman, LCDR William F. Ferrell, LCDR John K. Goodrum, PHAN Charles (Chuck) Hitchcock, PH2 Richard L. Horton, ENS George Mixon, CAPT Victor Louis Pesce, CWO Choyce Prewitt, and AD2 Brian Jon Vorderstrasse.

=== 1980s–1990s ===
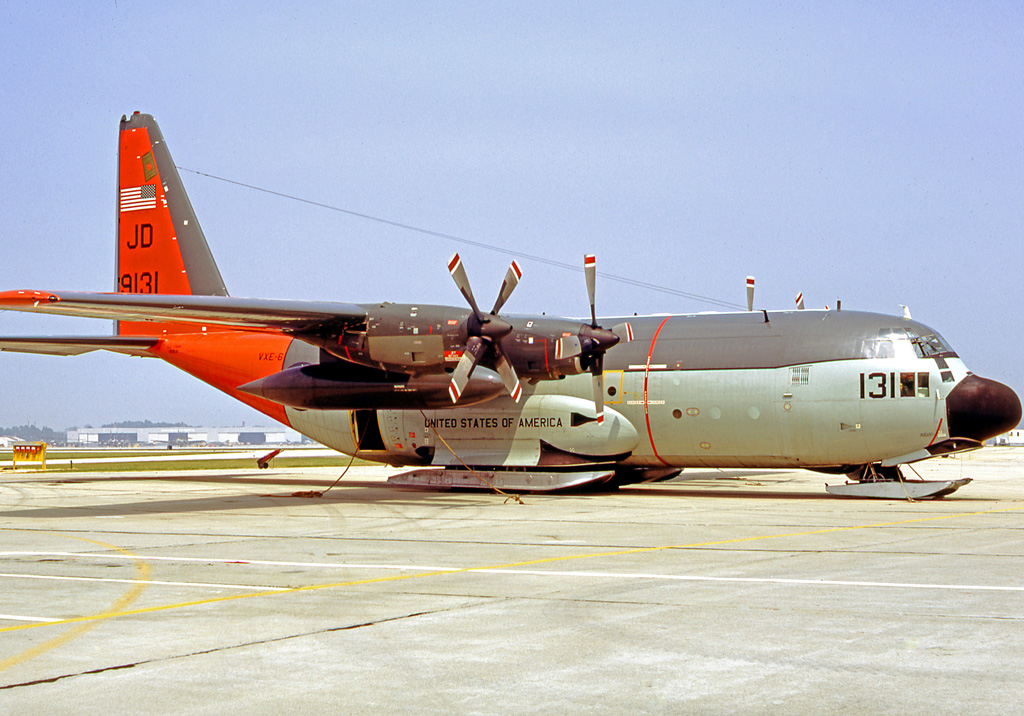
LC-130R Hercules 159131 of VXE-6 crashed in Antarctica in 1987 while on a recovery mission.

In 1988, another medical evacuation to the South African National Antarctic Expedition (SANAE) Station at Vesleskarvet nunatak broke the record for time and distance in a single Antarctic flight. Another highlight of the 1988 season was the recovery of an LC-130 Hercules that had been buried in ice and snow since its crash in 1971 near Dumont d'Urville Station. That aircraft was fully restored and operated with VXE-6 until its disestablishment in 1999.

In 1990, VXE-6 moved almost 8,000 passengers and over 6 million pounds of cargo which included five resupply flights to Vostok Station. That year, VXE-6 also accomplished the first wheeled landing of an LC-130 Hercules on a blue ice surface near Beardmore Glacier. On 25 October 1991, the first all-female crew took an LC-130 Hercules to "open up" Amundsen-Scott South Pole Station.

1993 saw VXE-6 break many records, including the transportation of nearly 9.4 million pounds of cargo and fuel. On 3 February 1996, during the squadron's 40th annual deployment to Antarctica, the squadron conducted its last helicopter mission in Antarctica. The helicopter component of VXE-6 was formally disestablished in April 1996.

1997 marked the beginning of a three-year program designed to transition United States Department of Defense long-range logistic support for the Antarctic Program from the U.S. Navy to the U.S. Air Force, specifically the New York Air National Guard (NYANG). 1998 was marked by the delivery of materials necessary to begin the construction of the new South Pole Station, completed in 2005.

Beginning in 1997, responsibility for long-range logistical support of Operation Deep Freeze was transferred from the VXE-6 squadron to the 109th Airlift Wing of the New York Air National Guard (NYANG). The transition was planned over a three-year period to avoid any negative impact on operations and to ensure a complete transfer of knowledge from the U.S. Navy unit to the NYANG. During the 1996/1997 season, VXE-6 operated six aircraft and was augmented by aircraft of the NYANG. VXE-6 operated five aircraft during the 1997/1998 season, and the number of flight hours was divided roughly equally between VXE-6 and the NYANG.

The United States Air Force, via the 109th Airlift Wing of the Air National Guard, officially took over responsibility as the primary Department of Defense partner for the National Science Foundation in support of the U.S. Antarctic Program at the beginning of the 1998/1999 season. A new organization, Detachment 13, was formed to manage the overall support from the Department of Defense. The detachment replaced the NSFA organization. The main organizations under Detachment 13 were the 109th Airlift Wing of the NYANG, the Navy’s VXE-6 squadron, and Aviation Technical Services. For the 1998/1999 season, the six LC-130s of the NYANG were augmented by only three LC-130 aircraft of the VXE-6 squadron.

Operation Deep Freeze 1999 was VXE-6's last deployment season in support of the United States Antarctic Program. On 24 February 1999, following the closure of Amundsen-Scott South Pole Station's summer operations, the last three LC-130R Hercules from VXE-6 returned to Naval Air Station Point Mugu, California. The squadron was disestablished on 1 April 1999. Over the course of its existence, VXE-6 logged more than 200,000 flight hours in direct support of United States interests (primarily scientific research) in the Antarctic. The squadron transported more than 195,000 passengers, delivered over 240 million pounds of dry cargo and nearly 10 million gallons of fuel to numerous sites throughout Antarctica.

== Aircraft ==
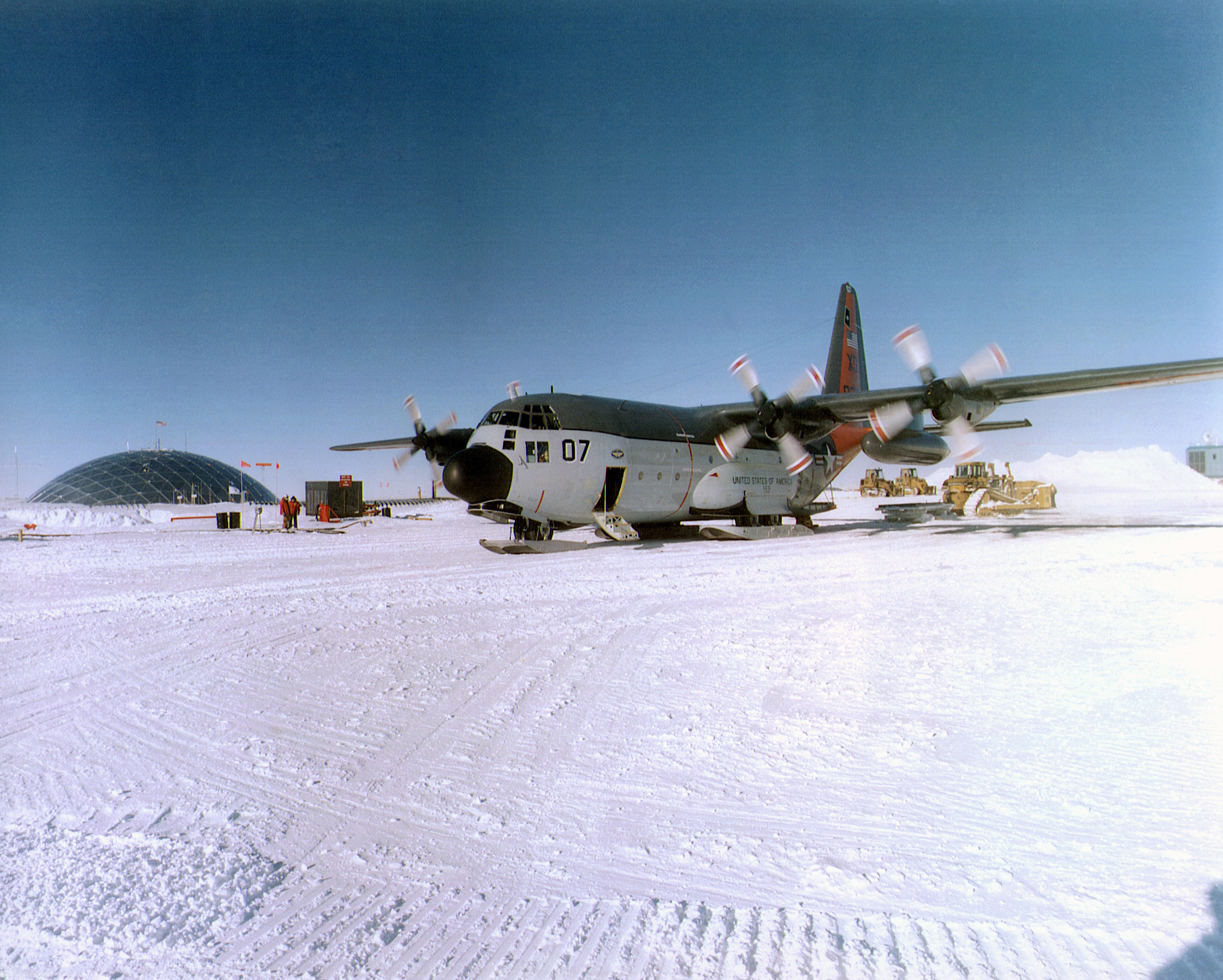
A LC-130F Hercules of VXE-6 taxies at the Amundsen–Scott South Pole Station

The squadron operated a variety of aircraft throughout the course of its existence. Fixed-wing aircraft included the Grumman UF-1L Albatross, de Havilland Canada UC-1 Otter, Douglas C-47 Skytrain (R4D Dakota and LC-47 models), Douglas C-54 Skymaster (R5D and C-54 models), Lockheed P-2 Neptune (P2V-2 and P2V-7 models), Lockheed R7V Constellation, and the Lockheed LC-130 Hercules (LC-130F and LC-130R models). Helicopters included the Sikorsky H-19 Chickasaw (HO4S-3 model) and Sikorsky LH-34 Seahorse (HUS-1A and HUS-1L models), and the Bell UH-1N Twin Huey. The ski-equipped LC-130 Hercules, with its long range and heavy load capability, had been in use in Antarctica since 1961 and continues in its critical role to this day with other units, VXE-6 having operated the type between 1969 and 1999. Introduced in 1971, the twin-engine UH-1N Huey helicopter allowed for the rapid transportation of field teams and cargo to otherwise inaccessible locations within a 150-mile radius of McMurdo Station. Three VXE-6 LC130R models (R1 159129 and R2 160740 and 160741) were converted to LC-130H and continue to fly with the NY ANG 109th Airlift Wing.

== Accidents and incidents ==
Twenty sailors and marines assigned to the squadron and four civilians died in Antarctica in support of Operation Deep Freeze as a result of aviation accidents.

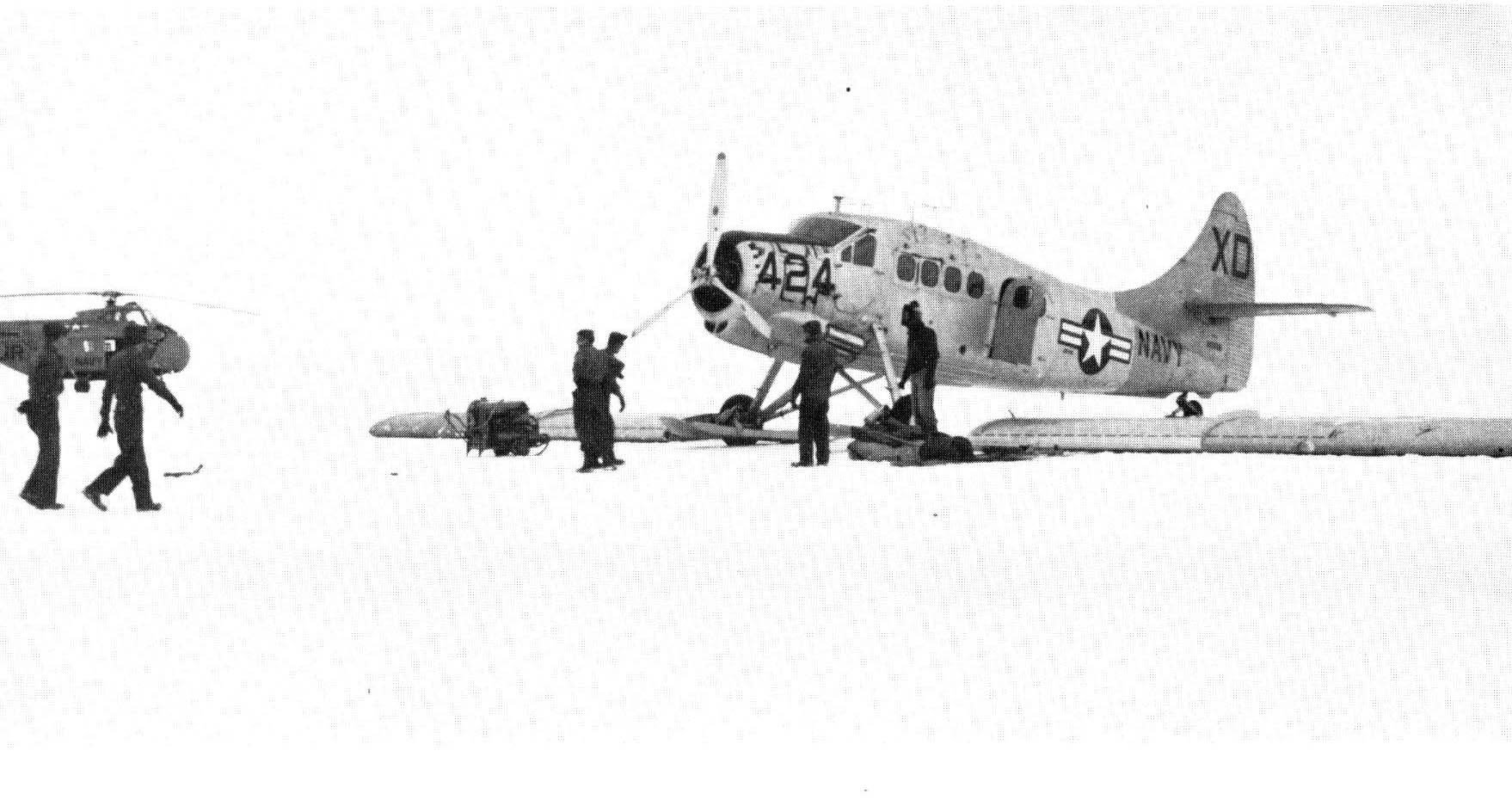
VX-6 crew members assemble a United States Navy UC-1 Otter aircraft at McMurdo Station. The XD tail code is clearly visible. This aircraft crashed on takeoff near Cape Bird, Ross Island, on 2 December 1955. A HO4S-3 is in the left background.

On 18 October 1956, a P2V-2 Neptune crashed at McMurdo Station during a landing in whiteout conditions, killing David W. Carey, Rayburn A. Hudman, Marion O. Marze, and Charles S. Miller.

On 12 July 1957, an HO4S-3 crashed in the vicinity of McMurdo Station during austral winter, killing Nelson R. Cole.

On 4 January 1959, a UC-1 Otter crashed on takeoff at Marble Point, killing Harvey E. Gardner and Lawrence J. Farrell.

On 9 November 1961, a P2V-7 crashed on takeoff from Wilkes Station, killing William D. Counts, Romuald P. Compton, William W. Chastain, James L. Gray and passenger geologist Dr. Edward C. Thiel.

On 2 February 1966, a LC-47J crashed on Ross Ice Shelf during takeoff, killing Ronald Rosenthal, Harold M. Morris, William D. Fordell, Richard S. Simmons, Wayne M. Shattuck, and Charles C. Kelley.

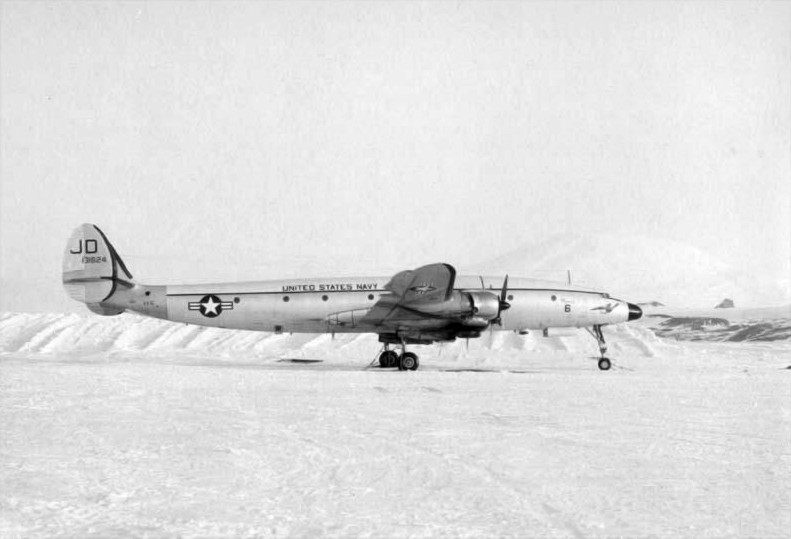
A United States Navy Lockheed C-121J Constellation of squadron VX-6 at Williams Field, McMurdo Station, on 1 November 1964

On 19 November 1969, a helicopter crash near Mount McLennan resulted in the deaths of two civilians—Jeremy Sykes, an NZARP film director and Thomas E. Berg, a USARP geologist. On 9 December 1987, an LC-130R (BuNo 159131, c/n 4522) crashed while landing at Site D-59 (Carrefour), 1,200 kilometers from McMurdo Station. LCDR Bruce Bailey and AK2 Donald M. Beatty were killed in this crash. Ironically, this mission was an attempt to recover the "City of Christchurch" aircraft that had crashed at the same site in February 1971. On 13 October 1992, a UH-1N Huey helicopter (BuNo 158249, c/n 31420) crashed in whiteout conditions near Cape Royds, resulting in the deaths of AMS1 Benjamin Micou and two civilians working for NZARP (Garth Varcoe and Terry Newport).

In addition to the aforementioned fatality accidents, there were a number of less serious accidents. On 8 October 1970, a Lockheed C-121J Constellation (BuNo 131644, c/n 4145, named "Pegasus") departed Christchurch, bound for Williams Field. Aboard were 12 crew and 68 passengers on the first flight of the 1970-1971 season of Operation Deep Freeze. Weather conditions at Williams Field deteriorated during the flight to whiteout conditions, with a fierce snowstorm and zero visibility. After making six low passes over the field, the aircraft attempted to land with 90 degree crosswinds of up to 40 mph. On the second attempt to land, the starboard main undercarriage hit a snow bank and separated. The starboard wing broke off, and the airplane slid through the snow, causing damage to the tail. There were only slight injuries to five people on board. The aircraft hulk is still there.

On 1 February 1971, an LC-130F (BuNo 148321, c/n 3567) crashed in Victoria Land when a JATO bottle broke loose during an open field takeoff. This caused the nose landing gear to collapse. Two weeks later, on 15 February 1971, another LC-130F (BuNo 148318, c/n 3562, named "City of Christchurch") taxied over a snow berm during a storm while maneuvering for take-off at McMurdo Station. The wing hit the ground, and the aircraft was burned beyond salvage. This was the first USN Hercules written off. On 28 January 1973, an LC-130R (BuNo 155917, c/n 4305) crash landed at Amundsen-Scott South Pole Station, after a late go-around in whiteout conditions.

The original LC-130R crashed while landing at Amundsen-Scott South Pole Station in 1973.

In the 1974/75 season during an open field takeoff on Dome C a JATO bottle on an LC-130F came loose and damaged the wing and one propeller thus causing an aborted takeoff. A fire in the wing caused further damage to the wing. An LC-130R was used in an attempt to rescue the scientists and aircrew. Reluctant to use JATO, the nose gear of the LC-130R collapsed in the rough ice and snow during the takeoff, forcing the rescue attempt to be aborted. A third LC-130 finally succeeded in rescuing all of the involved personnel. The National Science Foundation and the U.S. Navy made plans to recover the two downed aircraft during the next season. This involved replacement of the wing on the first aircraft and of the nose landing gear on the second aircraft. Preparations were made during the off-season to accomplish the repairs. After temperatures had risen sufficiently the recovery operations began in November 1975. Many flights were needed to transport all the material to the Dome C site. As an LC-130F took off for return to McMurdo another JATO bottle came loose, again damaging a propeller. Thus, Dome C became the home of three damaged LC-130s. As the damage to the last LC-130 was relatively minor compared to the others it was repaired first. Through the extraordinary effort of the repair team, maintenance team and aircrews, all three aircraft were repaired and recovered from Dome C.

On 31 December 1993, an LC-130 crashed on Lucy Glacier near Mount Isbell in the Geologists Range. The aircraft was retrieving a field party from the University of Wisconsin–Milwaukee who had spent six weeks investigating the geology in the mountains between the Byrd Glacier and Nimrod Glacier. The crash occurred in soft snow during an open-field takeoff when a propeller struck the snow, sending the propeller into the fuselage. Fuel from the damaged engine ignited, and the plane spun sideways sliding for approximately 200 meters down the glacier before coming to a stop. The plane was overhauled on site and flown back to McMurdo Station three weeks later.

== See also ==
- History of the United States Navy
- List of inactive United States Navy aircraft squadrons
- List of United States Navy aircraft squadrons
- VX-4
- VX-9
- VX-20
- VX-23
- VX-30
- VX-31
