= Operation Deep Freeze =

US operations in Antarctica

Operation Deep Freeze is the code name for a series of United States missions to Antarctica, beginning with "Operation Deep Freeze I" in 1955–56, followed by "Operation Deep Freeze II", "Operation Deep Freeze III", and so on. (There was an initial operation before Admiral Richard Byrd proposed "Deep Freeze".) Given the continuing and constant US presence in Antarctica since that date, "Operation Deep Freeze" has come to be used as a general term for US operations in that continent, and in particular for the regular missions to resupply US Antarctic bases, coordinated by the United States military. Task Force 199 was involved.

For a few decades the missions were led by the United States Navy, though the Air National Guard and National Science Foundation are also important parts of the missions. In Antarctica, when the polar dawn starts late in the year things begin warming up and the mission usually runs from late in the year to early the next year before the months of darkness and cold return. During that time bases will over-winter until the next year and Deep Freeze mission.

== Prior to International Geophysical Year ==
The U.S. Navy already had a record of earlier exploration in Antarctica. As early as 1839, Captain Charles Wilkes led the first U.S. Naval expedition into Antarctic waters. In 1929, Admiral Richard E. Byrd established a naval base at Little America I, led an expedition to explore further inland, and conducted the first flight over the South Pole. From 1934 to 1935, the second Byrd Expedition explored much further inland and also "wintered over". The third Byrd Expedition in 1940 charted the Ross Sea.

Byrd was instrumental in the Navy's Operation Highjump after World War II from 1946 to 1947, which charted most of the Antarctic coastline. In 1948, Commander Finn Ronne led an expedition that photographed over 450,000 square miles (1.1 million km^{2}) by air. In 1954–55, the icebreaker USS Atka made a scouting expedition for future landing sites and bays.

== Operation Deep Freeze I ==
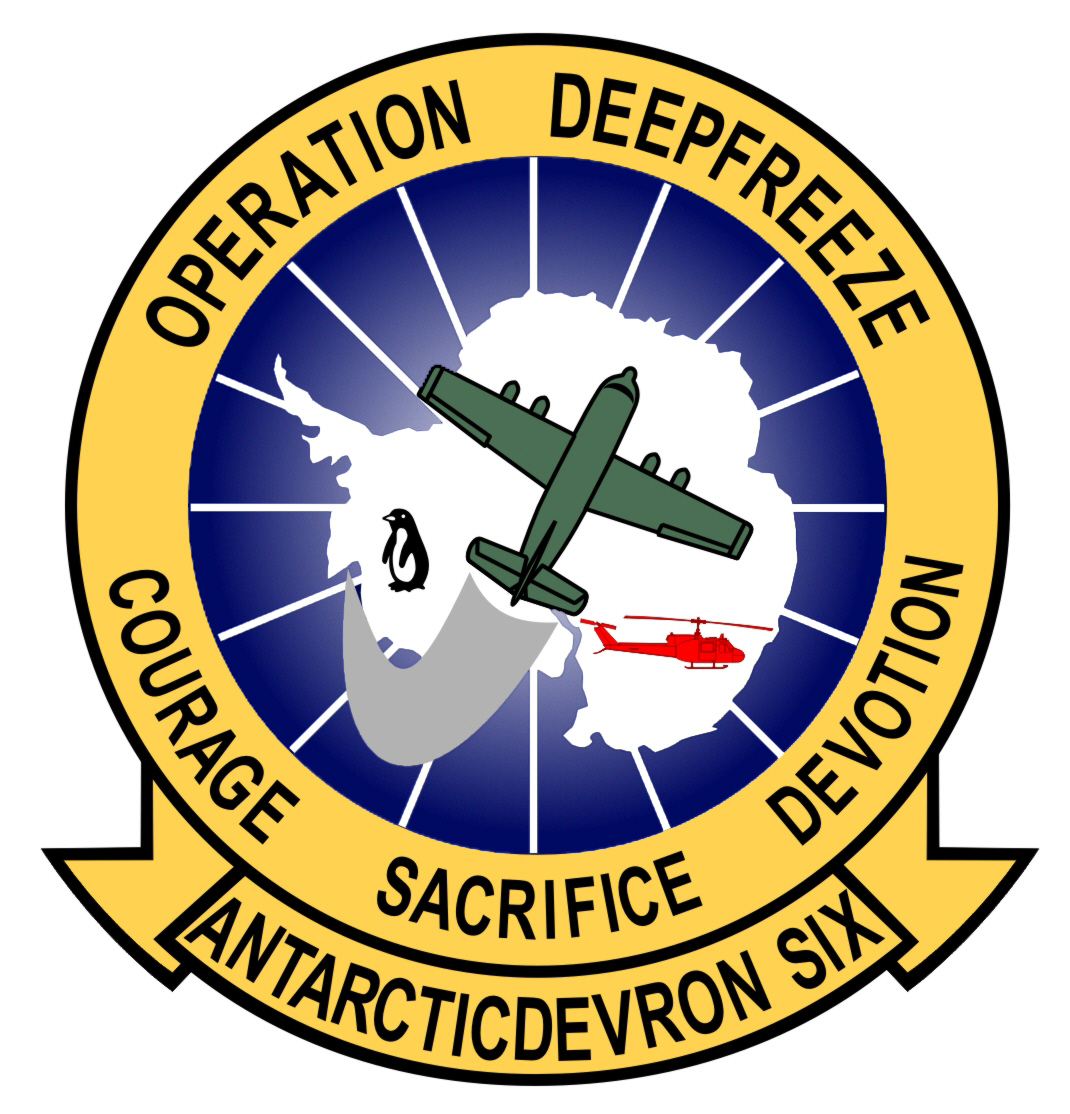
Squadron patch for the Navy Antarctic Development Squadron SIX (VXE-6), known as the Puckered Penguins.

The impetus behind Operation Deep Freeze I was the International Geophysical Year 1957–58. IGY as it was known was a collaborative effort among forty nations to carry out earth science studies from the North Pole to the South Pole and at points in between. The United States along with New Zealand, the United Kingdom, France, Japan, Norway, Chile, Argentina, and the U.S.S.R. agreed to go to the South Pole, the least explored area on Earth. Their goal was to advance world knowledge of Antarctic hydrography and weather systems, glacial movements, and marine life.

The U.S. Navy was charged with supporting the U.S. scientists for their portion of the IGY studies. Rear Admiral Richard E. Byrd, a veteran of four previous Antarctic Expeditions, was appointed as officer in charge of the expedition.

In 1955, Task Force 43, commanded by Rear Admiral George J. Dufek, was formed to provide logistical support for the expedition. Operation Deep Freeze I prepared a permanent research station and paved the way for more exhaustive research in later Deep Freeze operations. The expedition transpired over the Antarctic summer of November 1955 to April 1956, and was filmed by the U.S. Navy and Walt Disney Studios. For having designed the emblem of Task Force 43, Walt Disney became an honorary member of the expedition.

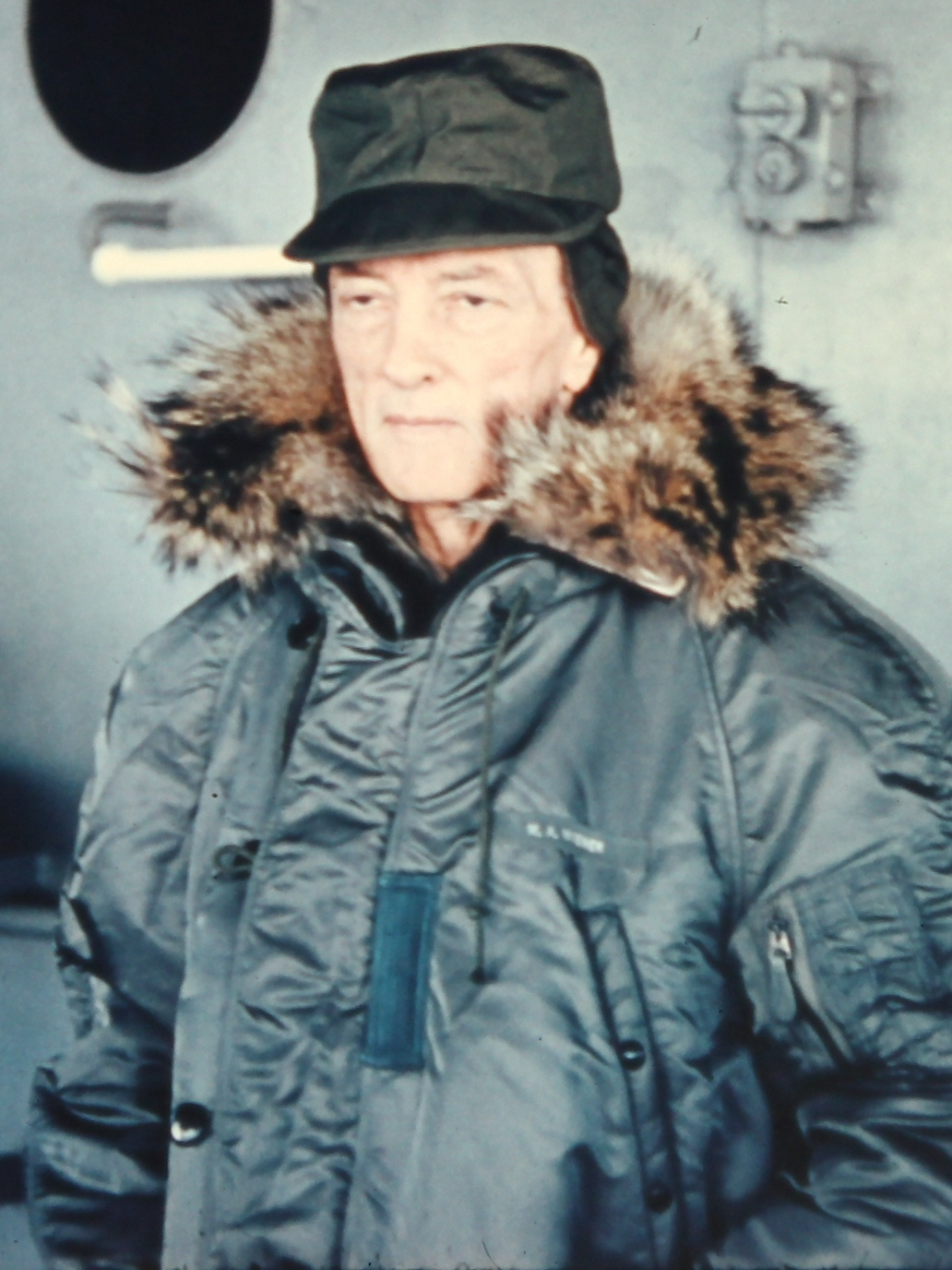
Admiral Richard Byrd on board USS Wyandot (Dec 1955)

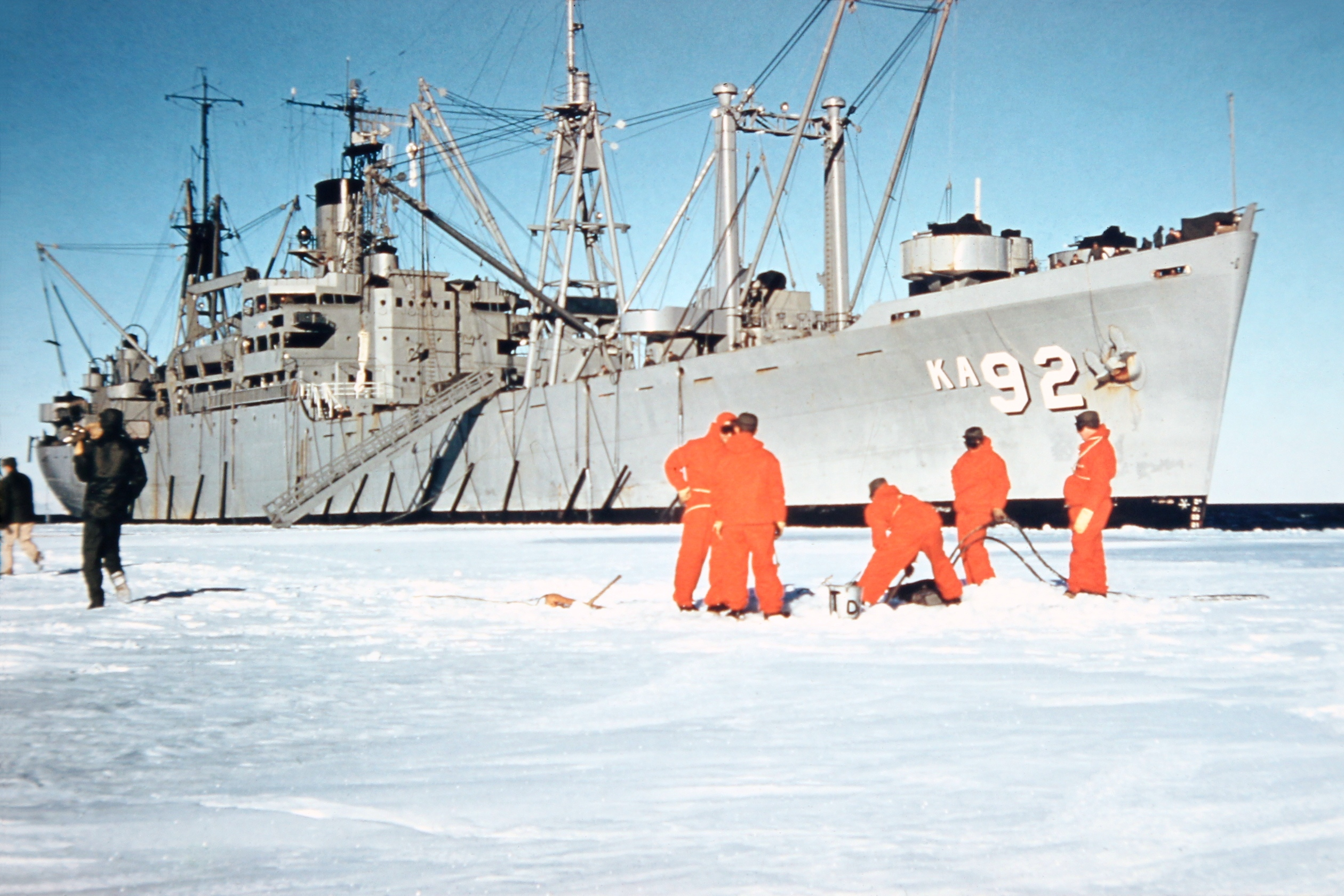
USS Wyandot mooring at McMurdo Station (Dec 1955)

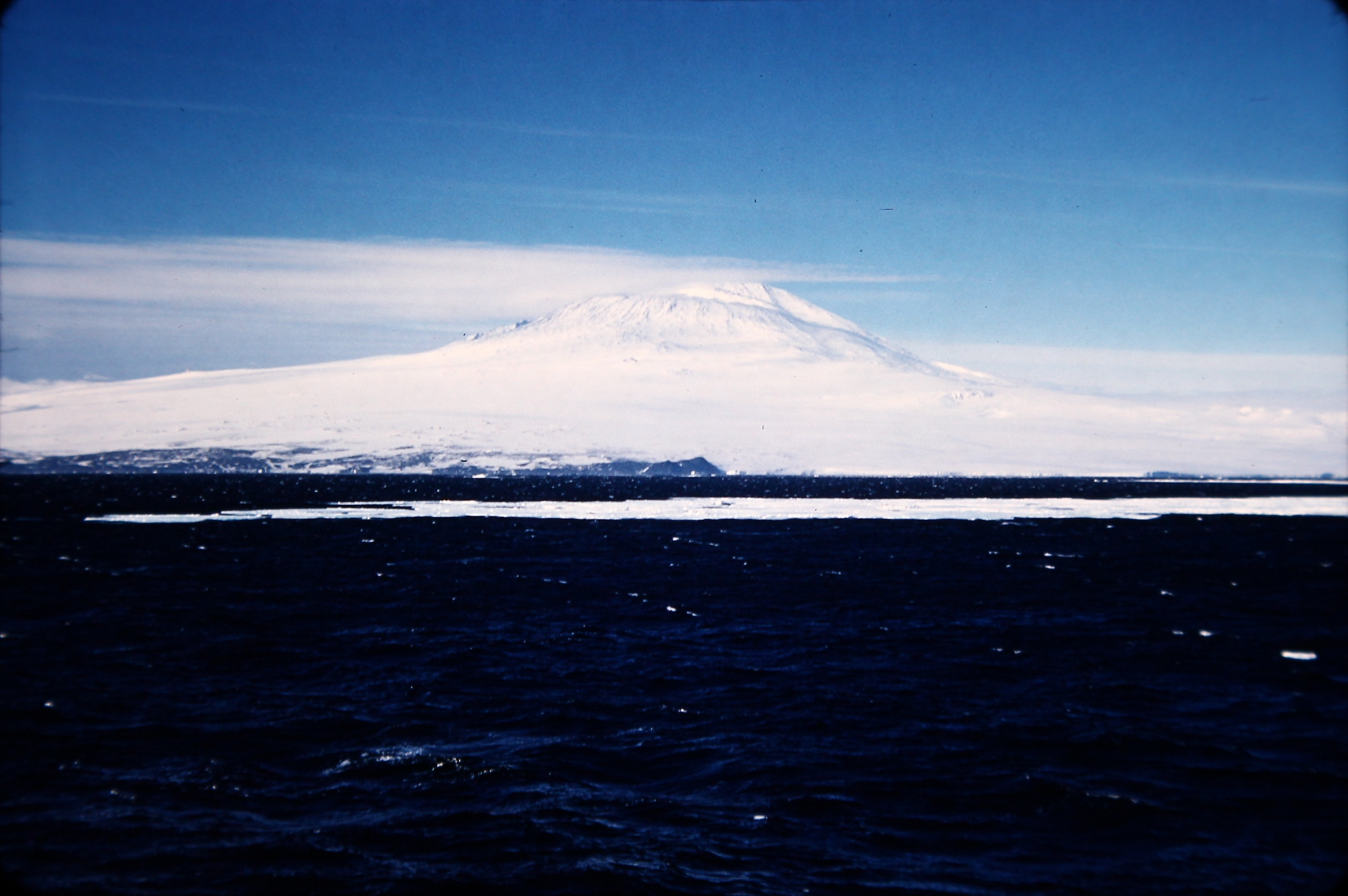
Mount Erebus in December 1955

Task Force 43 consisted of the following ships:

- USS Wyandot (AKA-92), freighter
- USS Arneb (AKA-56), freighter
- USS Edisto (AGB-2), ice breaker
- USS Glacier (AGB-4), ice breaker
- USCGC Eastwind (WAGB-279), ice breaker
- USS Nespelen (AOG-55), gasoline tanker
- USNS Greenville Victory (T-AK-237), merchant marine freighter
- USS YOG-34, aviation fuel carrier
- USS YOG-70, aviation fuel carrier

The ships of the task force were supplemented by a specially trained Navy Construction Battalion, formed at the Naval Construction Battalion Center at Davisville, Rhode Island and several aircraft.

On October 31, 1956, at 8:34 p.m. local time, the first aircraft ever to touch down at the South Pole skied to a halt atop the Antarctic ice sheet at 90 degrees South latitude. The U.S. Navy R4D was piloted by Lieutenant Commander (LCDR) Conrad C. "Gus" Shinn USN and included officer Frederick Ferrara. Immediately after the plane halted--with engines running to avoid a freeze-up (a practice still followed to this day)--U.S. Navy Adm. George J. Dufek., commander of Operation Deep Freeze, stepped out onto the ice, along with pilot Douglas Cordiner, to plant the Flag of the United States at the Pole. They were the first to stand there since Briton Robert Scott did more than 40 years before. Norwegian Roald Amundsen had beaten Scott in his race to the Pole. Amundsen's party survived the 800-mile return trip, Scott's did not. This flight was one part of the expeditions mounted for the IGY. This was not only the first aircraft to land at the South Pole, it was also the first time that Americans had ever set foot on the South Pole. The aircraft was named Que Sera, Sera after a popular song and is now on display at the Naval Aviation Museum in Pensacola, Florida. This marked the beginning of the establishment of the first permanent base, by airlift, at the South Pole (today known as the Amundsen–Scott South Pole Station) to support the International Geophysical Year. It was commissioned on January 1, 1957. The mission's second base, Byrd Station, was a (former) research station in West Antarctica established by the US Navy for Operation Deep Freeze II during the International Geophysical Year. The original station ("Old Byrd") lasted about four years before it began to collapse under the snow. Construction of a second underground station in a nearby location began in 1960, and it was used until 1972. The station was then converted into a summer-only field camp and was abandoned in 2004–05. The United States Antarctic Program airfield, built to service Operation Deep Freeze (first mission) was later named Williams Field or Willy Field.

== Subsequent developments ==
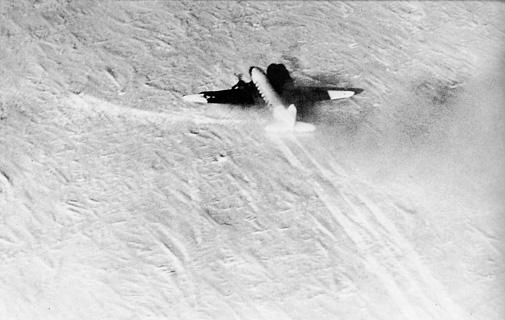
U.S. Navy R4D-5L "Dakota" making the first landing at the South Pole, 31 October 1956 for Operation Deep Freeze II

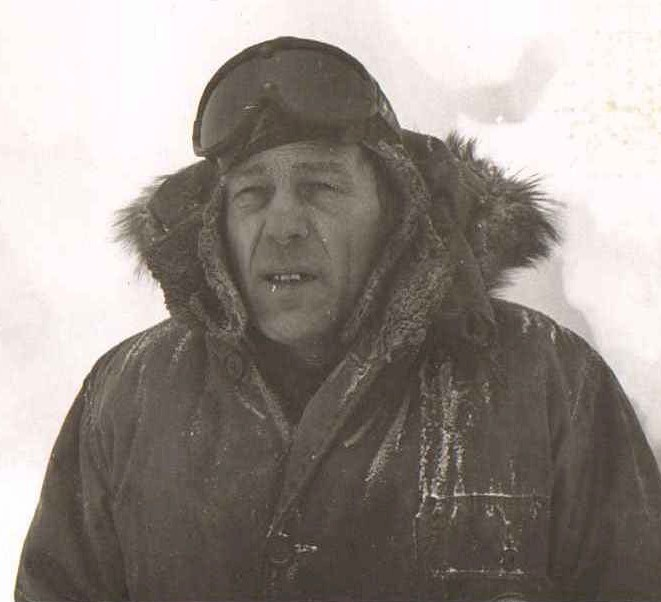
Helmut P. Jaron, Aurora Researcher at Byrd Station in 1961. The Jaron Cliffs are named for him.

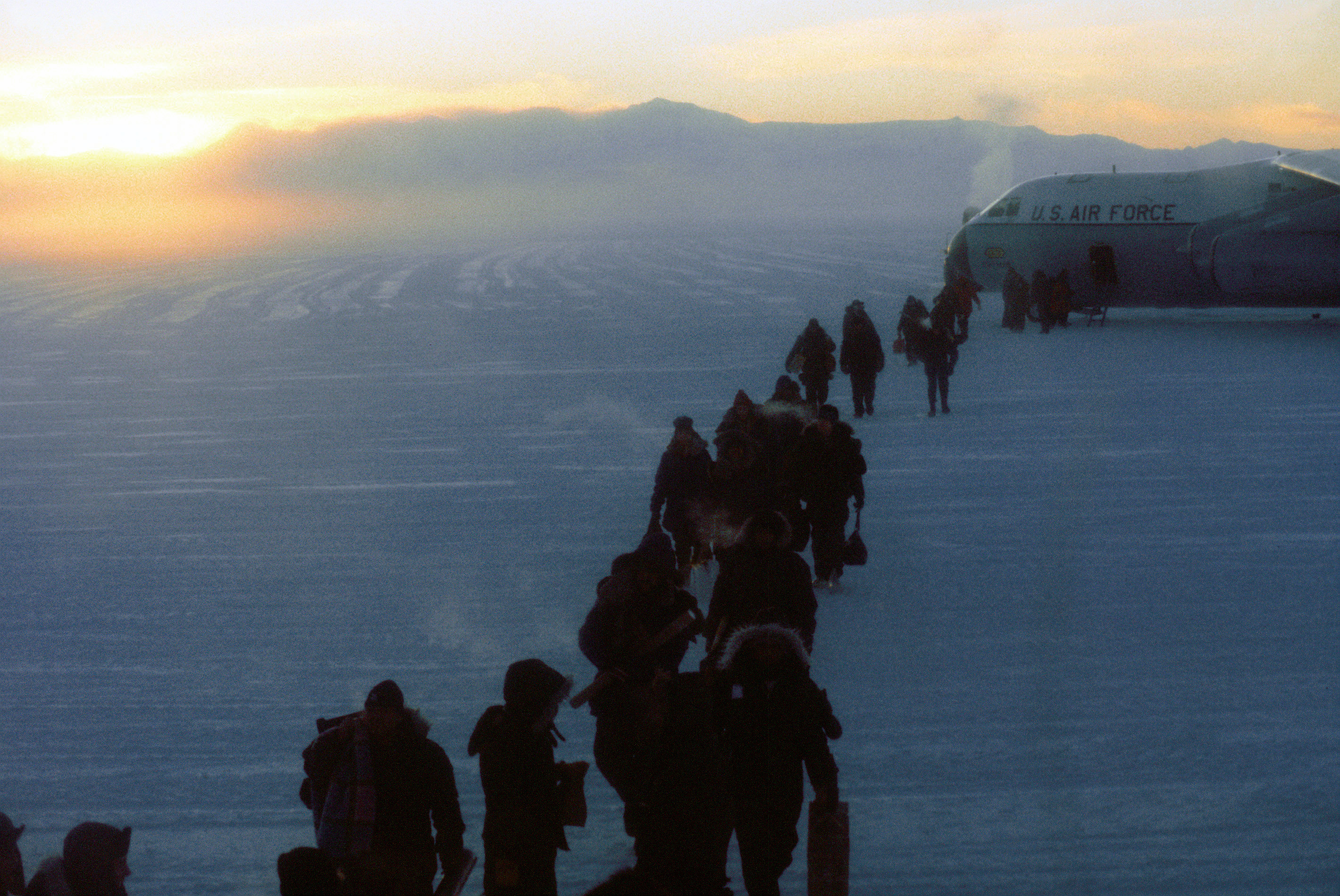
A C-141 loads for the flight back to Christchurch, New Zealand for Operation Deep Freeze '80

The Operation Deep Freeze activities were succeeded by "Operation Deep Freeze II", and so on. In 1960, the year of the fifth mission, codenames began to be based on the year (e.g., "Operation Deep Freeze 60").

Operation Deep Freeze I (1955-56), Operation Deep Freeze II (1956-57), and Operation Deep Freeze III (57-58), prepared the United States for the start of the IGY on 1 July 1957. The Mobile Construction Battalion for ODF I established Little America base in Kainan Bay and a base at McMurdo, and for ODF II built Byrd and the South Pole Station.

The Coast Guard sometimes participated; among others, the USCGC Westwind (WAGB-281), USCGC Northwind, the USCGC Polar Sea and the USCGC Glacier occasionally supported the mission. The Navy's Antarctic Development Squadron Six had been flying scientific and military missions to Greenland and the arctic compound's Williams Field since 1975. The 109th operated ski-equipped LC-130s had been flying National Science Foundation support missions to Antarctica since 1988. The official name for the Navy's command in Antarctica was US Naval Support Force Antarctica, (NSFA) Terminal Operations.

In early 1996, the United States National Guard announced that the 109th Airlift Wing at Schenectady County Airport in Scotia, New York was slated to assume that entire mission from the United States Navy in 1999. The Antarctic operation would be fully funded by the National Science Foundation. The 109th expected to add approximately 235 full-time personnel to support that operation. The decision to switch from Naval leadership to National Guard was one of a cost-saving measure due to post cold war budget cuts.

The possibility of the Air National Guard assuming operational control of the mission had first emerged in 1988. The 109th Airlift Wing had been notified that, almost overnight, one of the Distant Early Warning Line (DEW) radar sites that it supported in Greenland was going to be shut down. The other sites would soon follow, and the 109th would be largely out of business because its primary mission had ended. The unit had been informally keeping tabs on Navy LC-130 operations supporting the National Science Foundation in Antarctica. Because of its aging aircraft fleet and extensive depot maintenance period, the U.S. Navy asked if the 109th could provide limited emergency search and rescue (SAR) capability for two years to support Operation Deep Freeze, which the Air Guard accepted. At that time, it had no thought of taking over the mission. The 109th believed it to be an exercise in futility for its aircraft to deploy to the Antarctic to merely wait for emergency SAR missions, so it asked if the Navy could help carry cargo to the South Pole. The Navy resisted at first because its procedures and cargo configurations differed from those of the Air Guard, but eventually it agreed. The main mission of the U.S. Navy and Air National Guard C-130s was to airlift fuel and supplies to the National Science Foundation's South Pole Station so that its personnel could survive the isolation of the long Antarctic winter, which lasted from February to October.

An Air National Guard working group had been formed to study the idea in 1990. The following year, a dialog began among the Air National Guard, the Air Staff, and the U.S. Navy. Among other issues, it was difficult at first for the Air Guard to convince the Air Staff to commit long term resources to an area of the world that had not been declared a warfighting region because of international treaties. The Air Guard had supported military operations in Greenland and the Arctic (including classified U.S. Navy operations) since the mid-1970s with the ski-equipped C-130s of the 109th Airlift Wing. It convinced Headquarters, United States Air Force that it was not in the nation's best interest to abandon the capability to achieve quick and reliable air access to both polar regions.

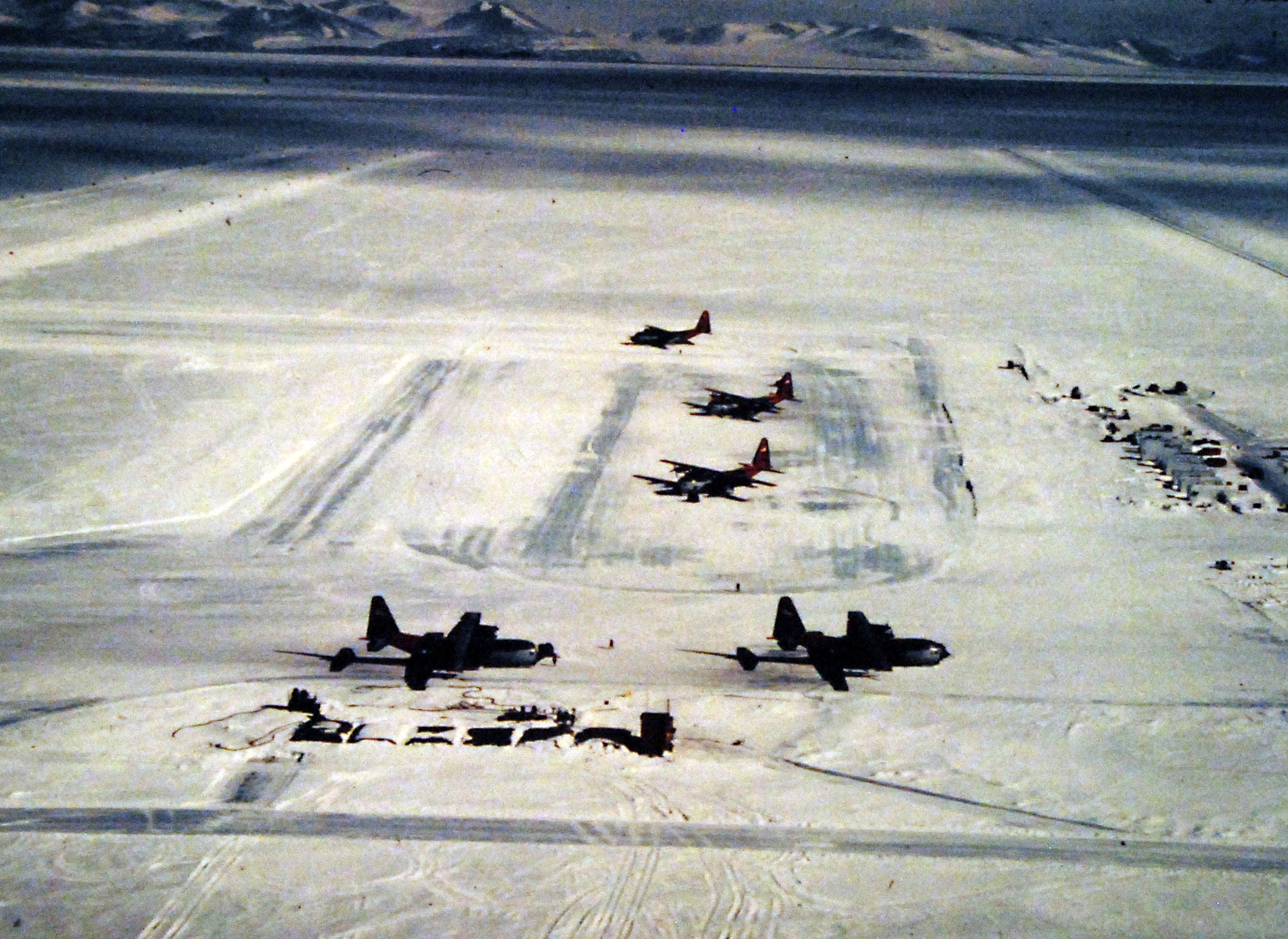
LC-130 of the Antarctic Development Squadron Six (VXE 6) at the McMurdo Sound Ice Runway for Operation Deep Freeze '80. Photo 14 December 1979

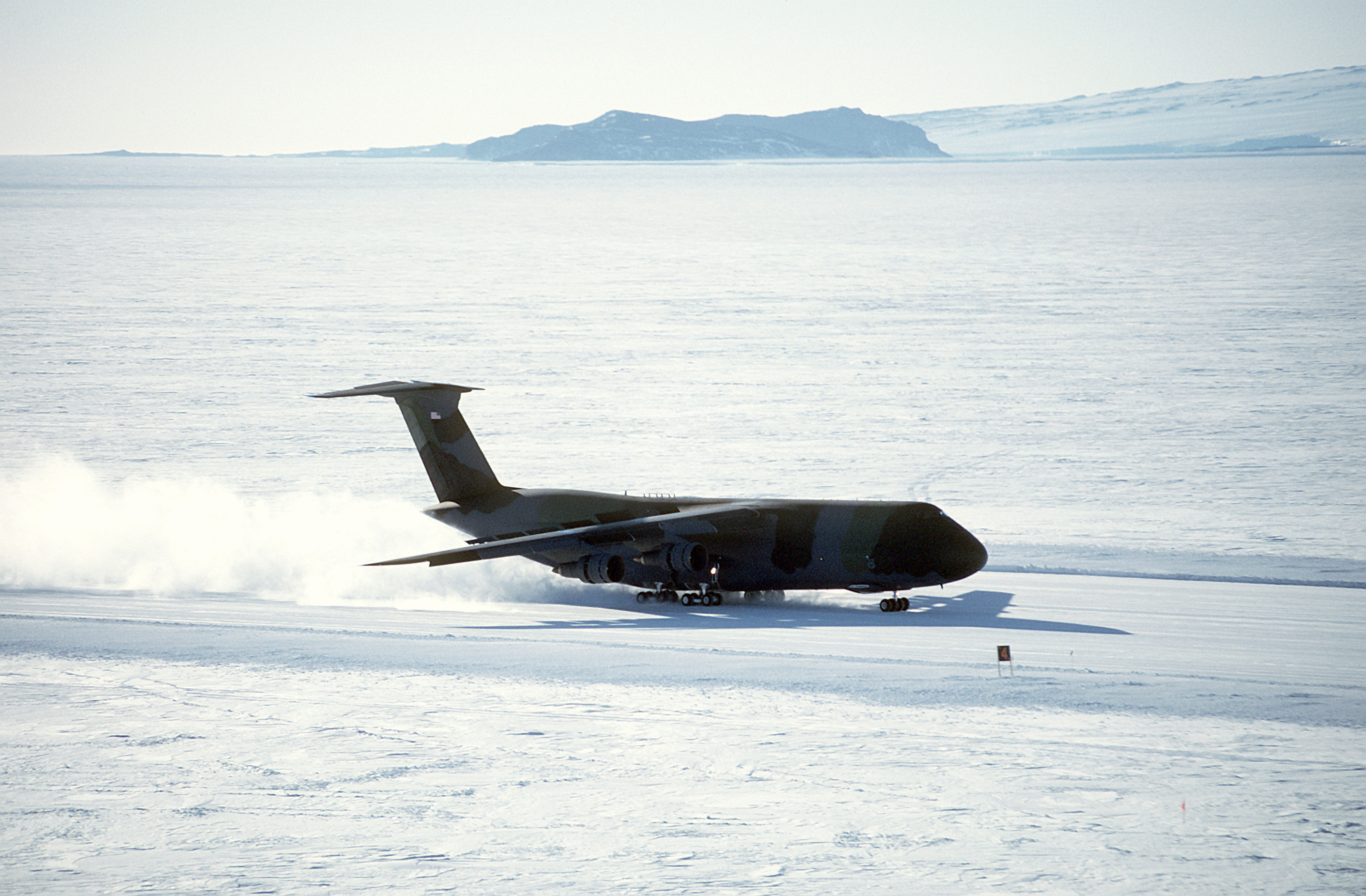
A C-5B lands on the McMurdo sound Ice Runway for Operation Deep Freeze '90

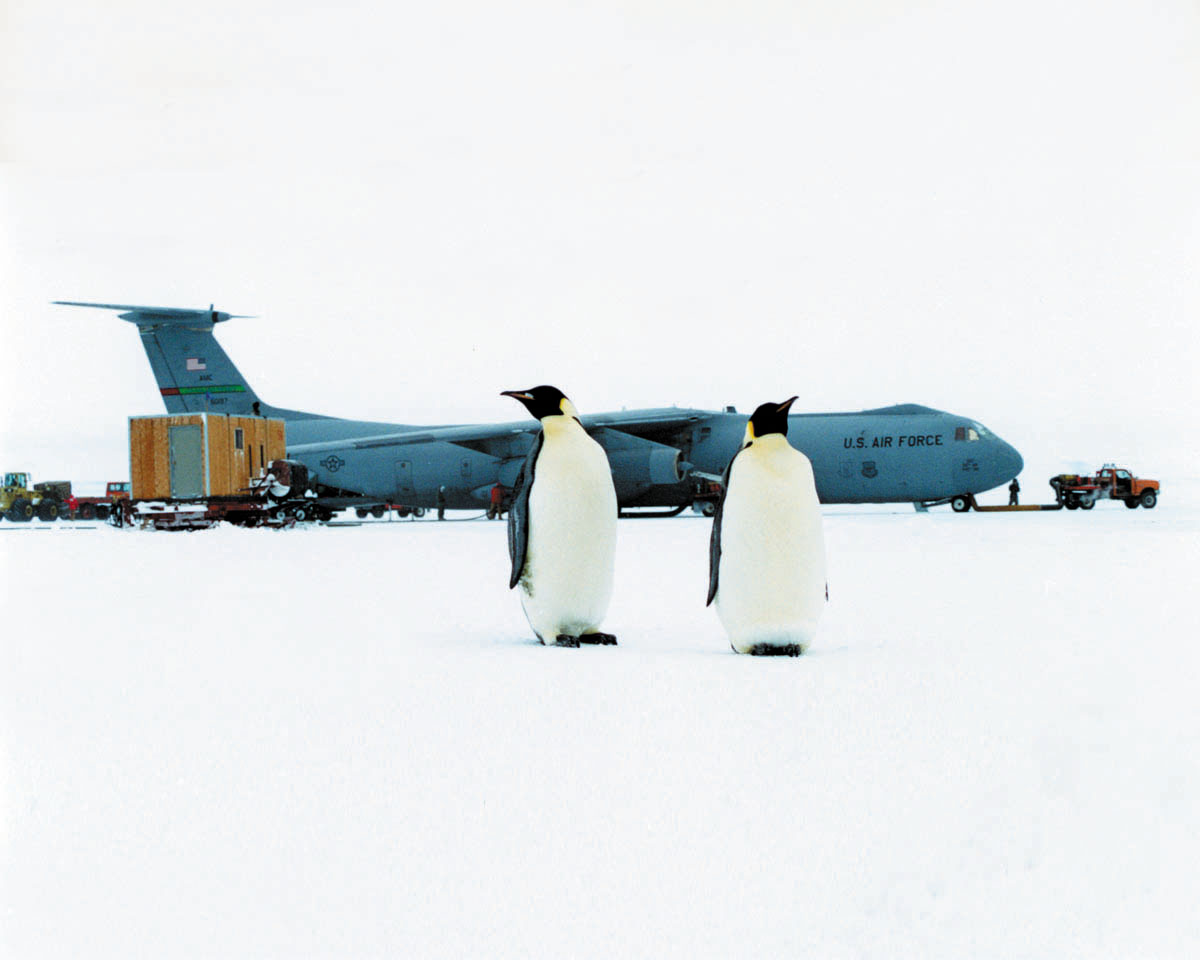
A US Air Force C-141 Starlifter participating in Operation Deep Freeze with penguins, 1997.

In March 1993, the U.S. Navy hosted a two-day workshop with representatives of the National Science Foundation, Air National Guard, and other interested parties to explore logistics support options for the operation. A draft concept of operations had been prepared by the Air Directorate of the National Guard Bureau in 1993. In February 1996, a commitment was made to transfer the Operation Deep Freeze mission and all LC-130H aircraft operating within the U.S. Department of Defense to the Air National Guard. In September 1996, senior officers from the 109th Airlift Wing briefed the National Guard Bureau on their concept of operations and the status of their preparations to implement Operation Deep Freeze.

Under the transition plan which they had developed, the Air National Guard would continue to augment the U.S. Navy during the October 1996 – March 1997 operating season for the United States Antarctic Program. At the end of the October 1997 – March 1998 season, the Air National Guard would assume command of the program. During the third year of the transition program (October 1998 to March 1999), the U.S. Navy would augment the ANG before the latter took over the entire program the following year. There would be seven LC-130s in theater. They would stage from Christchurch International Airport in Christchurch, New Zealand, to McMurdo Station, Antarctica. Traditional Guardsmen, technicians, and the cadre of Active Guard Reservists specifically brought on board to support Operation Deep Freeze would all be involved in the mission. When fully transitioned to the Air National Guard, the 109th Airlift Wing would have ten LC-130s in its inventory. These would include upgrades of four LC-130 aircraft in-service with the unit plus three new aircraft and three that would be transferred from the U.S. Navy. Air National Guard estimates of the savings to be realized by consolidating the operation in the hands of the 109th Airlift Wing ranged from US $5 million to US$15 million a year. The actual transition to Air Guard control began in March 1996.

By 1999, the United States Navy had transferred military support operations for Antarctica over to the United States Air Force and its contractor Raytheon Polar Services. Operation Deep Freeze was managed by the U.S. Air Force and Air National Guard members of Air National Guard Detachment 13, a subordinate unit which administratively reported directly to the Air National Guard Readiness Center (ANGRC) at Andrews Air Force Base in Maryland, and operationally reported to United States Pacific Command (USPACOM) in Honolulu, Hawaii. Upon its deactivation in 2005, the detachment consisted of a full-time officer (Commander) and four full-time non-commissioned officers (Logistics, Communications, Security Forces, and Information Management) which remained in New Zealand year-round. Operational command now belongs to Commander, Thirteenth Air Force as part of USPACOM. In 2005, through the office of the Secretary of Defense, the commander of U.S. Pacific Command was designated to support the Joint Task Force Support Forces Antarctica, Operation Deep Freeze. CDRUSPACOM delegated this joint operation to the Commander, Pacific Air Forces, who then delegated primary responsibility for execution of the JTF SFA operation to the Commander, 13th Air Force.

=== Incidents ===
- 30 December 1946, 1946 Antarctica PBM Mariner crash. Three Naval aviators were killed when their PBM-5 crashed during Operation Highjump.
- 22 January 1955. Pilot John P. Moore (Mount Moore) was killed in helicopter crash at Kainan Bay.
- 6 January 1956. Richard T. Williams (Williams Field) was killed when the tractor he was driving crashed through the ice after being offloaded from the USS Glacier (AGB-4), off Cape Royds during Operation Deep Freeze I.
- 5 March 1956. Max R. Kiel (Kiel Glacier) was swallowed by a 100 foot-deep crevasse while driving a tractor 110 miles east of Little America, during Operation Deep Freeze I. His body was unable to be recovered.
- 18 October 1956. A P2V-2N crashed in a storm at McMurdo Station during Operation Deep Freeze II, killing Lt. David W. Carey (Carey Glacier), AD1 Marion O. Marze (Marze Peak), and AT1 Charles S. Miller (Miller Peak) on impact; Capt. Rayburn A. Hudman, USMC (Hudman Glacier), survived the crash but died of his injuries roughly 24 hours later.
- 14 January 1957. Ollie B. Bartley (Bartley Glacier) was killed after falling through ice at Hut Point.
- 4 January 1959. Two Naval aviators were killed when their Otter cargo aircraft crashed on takeoff at Marble Point.
- 2 November 1960. Orlan F. John (John Nunatak) was killed in an accidental explosion at McMurdo Station.
- 9 November 1961. Four Naval aviators and a civilian seismologist were killed when their P2V Neptune crashed on takeoff from Wilkes Station.
- 3 February 1966. Six Naval aviators killed when their DC-3 crashed on landing while participating in Operation Deep Freeze.
- 9 December 1987. Two Naval aviators were killed and 9 injured when their Lockheed LC-130 Hercules crashed on landing at an airstrip 860 miles northeast of McMurdo Station.

== 21st century ==
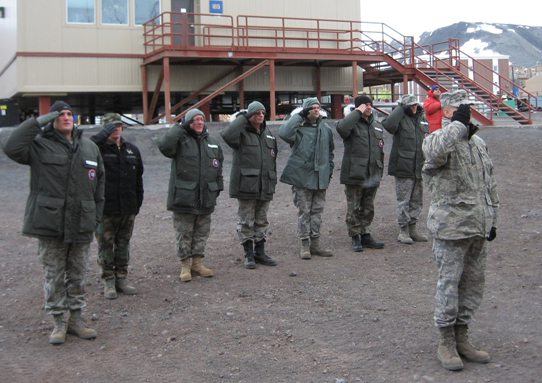
Airmen saluting the last LC-130 to depart from Antarctica in 2010

United States civilian and scientific operations on the Antarctic continent are overseen by the United States Antarctic Program as well as the National Science Foundation. Military support missions flown from Christchurch International Airport are conducted during the Antarctic summer (late September to early March) each year by The 109th Airlift Wing Scotia New York. The Ski equipped LC-130 Hercules is the backbone of Operation Deep Freeze. LC-130 Hercules aircraft provide the logistical movement of cargo to remote operating locations on the continent. These aircraft are augmented by the United States Coast Guard icebreaker USCGC Polar Star, the Air Force Materiel Command, and the Military Sealift Command. The United States Air Force 13th Air Expeditionary Group deploys to Christchurch, New Zealand during the operational season.

A documentary on the early missions was featured in the documentary film Ice Eagles: An Account of American Aviation in Antarctica, which was released on DVD in 2018.

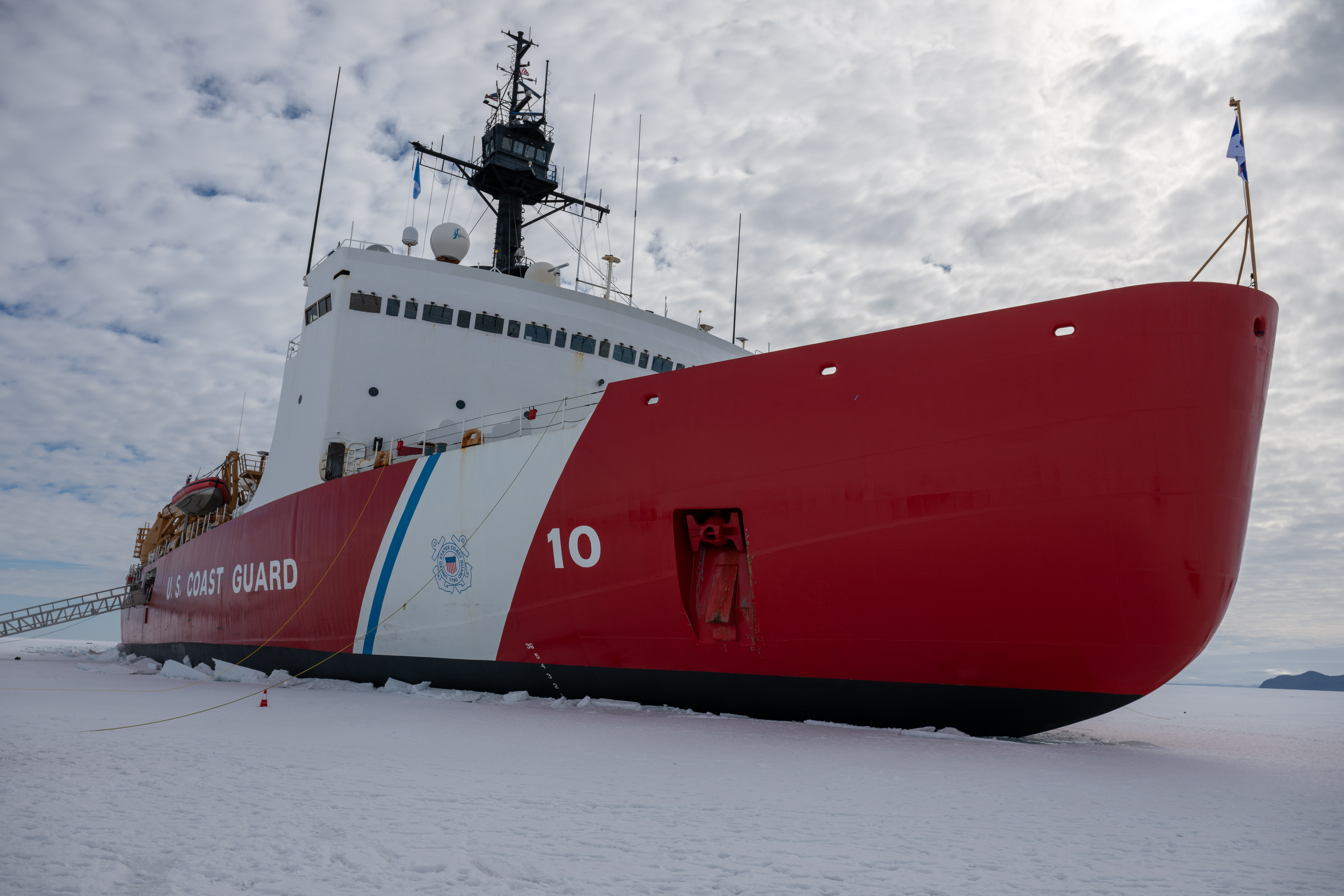
USCGC Polar Star (WAGB 10) in McMurdo Sound for Operation Deep Freeze. January 7, 2025

Lockheed Martin is currently the prime contractor for the National Science Foundation's United States Antarctic Program. The contract award was announced via a NSF press release on 28 December 2011 after a bid solicitation process of almost four years. Support operations began on 1 April 2012. The original contract synopsis indicated that the government was contemplating a contract period of 11 1/2 years.

In 2021-22 Operation Deep Freeze brought in 100 personnel and nearly 50 thousand pounds of food by air to McMurdo station.

== See also ==
- Ice pier
- List of Antarctic expeditions
- McMurdo Sound
- McMurdo Station
- Military activity in the Antarctic
- Mount Lisicky
- Ross Sea
- The Antarctic Sun, online newspaper of the U.S. Antarctic Program
- United States Antarctic Program
- Winter Quarters Bay
- McMurdo Station transportation

== Bibliography ==
- Belanger, Dian Olson. Deep Freeze: The United States, the International Geophysical Year, and the Origins of Antarctica's Age of Science. Boulder, Colorado: University Press of Colorado, 2006. ISBN 0870818309 OCLC 69594000
- Dufek, George J. Operation Deep Freeze. New York: Harcourt Brace, 1957. OCLC 41818128
- Ellery D. Wallwork, Kathryn A. Wilcoxson. Operation Deep Freeze: 50 Years of US Air Force Airlift in Antarctica 1956–2006. Scott Air Force Base: Office of History, Air Mobility Command, 2006. OCLC 156828085
- Gillespie, Noel (November–December 1999). "'Deep Freeze': US Navy Operations in Antarctica 1955–1999, Part One". Air Enthusiast (84): 54–63. ISSN 0143-5450.
- United States. Antarctic Highlights: Operation Deep Freeze. Washington, D.C.: U.S. G.P.O., 1969. OCLC 39250653
