= Fruzhin Peak =

Mountain in Antarctica

Location of Sentinel Range in Western Antarctica.

Sentinel Range map.

Fruzhin Peak (Bulgarian: връх Фружин, romanized: vrah Fruzhin, IPA: [ˈvrɤx ˈfruʒin]) is the peak rising to 1350 m in the south part of Petvar Heights, southeast Sentinel Range in Ellsworth Mountains, Antarctica. It overlooks Hudman Glacier to the west and Carey Glacier to the east.

The peak is named after the Bulgarian prince and military commander Fruzhin (14-15th century).

== Location ==
Fruzhin Peak is located at 78°50′27″S 84°16′40″W, which is 8.02 km east by south of Marze Peak, 6.04 km south-southeast of Miller Peak, 5.83 km west-southwest of Malkoch Peak and 9.5 km northwest of Mountainview Ridge. US mapping in 1961, updated in 1988.

== See also ==
- Mountains in Antarctica

== Maps ==
- Vinson Massif. Scale 1:250 000 topographic map. Reston, Virginia: US Geological Survey, 1988.
- Antarctic Digital Database (ADD). Scale 1:250000 topographic map of Antarctica. Scientific Committee on Antarctic Research (SCAR). Since 1993, regularly updated.
