= Bagra Peak =

Mountain in Antarctica

Location of Sentinel Range in Western Antarctica.

Sentinel Range map.

Bagra Peak (Bulgarian: връх Багра, romanized: vrah Bagra, IPA: [ˈvrɤɣ ˈbaɡrɐ]) is the peak rising to 1990 m in the north part of Petvar Heights, southeast Sentinel Range in Ellsworth Mountains, Antarctica, and overlooking Kornicker Glacier to the northwest, Razboyna Glacier to the northeast, and Drama Glacier to the east.

The peak is named after the settlement of Bagra in Southern Bulgaria.

== Location ==
Bagra Peak is located at 78°43′49″S 84°27′08″W, which is 3.52 km northeast of Mount Landolt, 14.35 km south of Mount Benson, 8.41 km west of Long Peak and 7.12 km north of Miller Peak. US mapping in 1961, updated in 1988.

== See also ==
- Mountains in Antarctica

== Maps ==
- Vinson Massif. Scale 1:250 000 topographic map. Reston, Virginia: US Geological Survey, 1988.
- Antarctic Digital Database (ADD). Scale 1:250000 topographic map of Antarctica. Scientific Committee on Antarctic Research (SCAR). Since 1993, regularly updated.
