= Malkoch Peak =

Mountain in Ellsworth Land, Antarctica

Location of Sentinel Range in Western Antarctica

Sentinel Range map

Malkoch Peak (Bulgarian: връх Малкоч, romanized: vrah Malkoch, IPA: [ˈvrɤx ˈmaɫkot͡ʃ]) is the peak rising to 1299 m in the southeast part of Petvar Heights, southeast Sentinel Range in Ellsworth Mountains, Antarctica, and overlooking Carey Glacier to the west and Rutford Ice Stream to the east.

The peak is named after the village of Malkoch in Bulgaria.

== Location ==
Malkoch Peak is located at 78°49′17″S 84°01′39″W, which is 5.83 km east-northeast of Fruzhin Peak, 8.94 km southeast of Miller Peak, 2.52 km south of Ruset Peak and 8.57 km north of Mountainview Ridge. US mapping in 1961, updated in 1988.

== See also ==
- Mountains in Antarctica
