= Ruset Peak =

Mountain in Antarctica

Location of Sentinel Range in Western Antarctica.

Sentinel Range map.

Ruset Peak (Bulgarian: връх Русет, romanized: vrah Ruset, IPA: [ˈvrɤx ˈrusɛt]) is the peak rising to 1453 m in the southeast part of Petvar Heights, southeast Sentinel Range in Ellsworth Mountains, Antarctica, and overlooking Carey Glacier to the west, Divdyadovo Glacier to the north, and Rutford Ice Stream to the east.

The peak is named after the Bulgarian cartographer Aleksandar Ruset (1810–1861).

== Location ==
Ruset Peak is located at 78°47′56″S 84°01′10″W, which is 8.6 km east of Miller Peak, 8.1 km south of Long Peak and 2.52 km north of Malkoch Peak. US mapping in 1961, updated in 1988.

== Maps ==
- Vinson Massif. Scale 1:250 000 topographic map. Reston, Virginia: US Geological Survey, 1988.
- Antarctic Digital Database (ADD). Scale 1:250000 topographic map of Antarctica. Scientific Committee on Antarctic Research (SCAR). Since 1993, regularly updated.
