= Gabare Glacier =

Glacier in Antarctica

- Location of Sentinel Range in Western Antarctica

- Location within Antarctica
- Location: Ellsworth Land
- Coordinates: 78°44′20″S 84°04′20″W
- Length: 5 nautical miles (9.3 km; 5.8 mi)
- Width: 1.4 nautical miles (2.6 km; 1.6 mi)
- Thickness: unknown
- Terminus: east southeast of Long Peak
- Status: unknown

Sentinel Range map.

Gabare Glacier (Bulgarian: ледник Габаре, romanized: lednik Gabare, IPA: [ˈlɛdniɡ ˈɡabɐrɛ]) is the 5 nautical miles (9.3 km; 5.8 mi) long and 1.4 nautical miles (2.6 km; 1.6 mi) wide glacier in Petvar Heights on the southeast side of Sentinel Range in Ellsworth Mountains, Antarctica situated northwest of Divdyadovo Glacier, northeast of the head of Carey Glacier, and southeast of Drama Glacier. It is flowing eastwards to leave the range east-southeast of Long Peak.

The feature is named after the settlement of Gabare in northwestern Bulgaria.

== Location ==
Gabare Glacier is centred at 78°44′20″S 84°04′20″W. US mapping in 1988.

== See also ==
- List of glaciers in the Antarctic
- Glaciology

== Maps ==
- Vinson Massif. Scale 1:250 000 topographic map. Reston, Virginia: US Geological Survey, 1988.
- Antarctic Digital Database (ADD). Scale 1:250000 topographic map of Antarctica. Scientific Committee on Antarctic Research (SCAR). Since 1993, regularly updated.
