= Divdyadovo Glacier =

Glacier in Antarctica

- Location of Sentinel Range in Western Antarctica

- Location within Antarctica
- Location: Ellsworth Land
- Coordinates: 78°46′20″S 83°58′00″W
- Length: 4.3 nautical miles (8.0 km; 4.9 mi)
- Width: 1.6 nautical miles (3.0 km; 1.8 mi)
- Thickness: unknown
- Terminus: Long Peak
- Status: unknown

Sentinel Range map.

Divdyadovo Glacier (Bulgarian: ледник Дивдядово, romanized: lednik Divdyadovo, IPA: [ˈlɛdniɡ divˈdʲadovo]) is the 4.3 nautical miles (8.0 km; 4.9 mi) long and 1.6 nautical miles (3.0 km; 1.8 mi) wide glacier in Petvar Heights on the southeast side of Sentinel Range in Ellsworth Mountains, Antarctica situated northeast of Carey Glacier and southeast of Drama Glacier. It is flowing northeastwards, then north of Ruset Peak turning east-southeastwards to leave the range southeast of Long Peak.

The feature is named after the settlement of Divdyadovo in northeastern Bulgaria.

== Location ==
Divdyadovo Glacier is centred at 78°46′20″S 83°58′00″W. US mapping in 1988.

== See also ==
- List of glaciers in the Antarctic
- Glaciology

== Maps ==
- Vinson Massif. Scale 1:250 000 topographic map. Reston, Virginia: US Geological Survey, 1988.
- Antarctic Digital Database (ADD). Scale 1:250000 topographic map of Antarctica. Scientific Committee on Antarctic Research (SCAR). Since 1993, regularly updated.
