= Drama Glacier =

Glacier in Antarctica

- Location of Sentinel Range in Western Antarctica

- Location within Antarctica
- Location: Ellsworth Land
- Coordinates: 78°43′30″S 84°16′00″W
- Length: 5.4 nautical miles (10.0 km; 6.2 mi)
- Width: 0.8 nautical miles (1.5 km; 0.92 mi)
- Thickness: unknown
- Terminus: Rutford Ice Stream
- Status: unknown

Sentinel Range map.

Drama Glacier (Bulgarian: ледник Драма, romanized: lednik Drama, IPA: [ˈlɛdniɡ ˈdramɐ]) is the 10 km long and 1.5 km wide glacier in Petvar Heights on the east side of southern Sentinel Range in Ellsworth Mountains, Antarctica, which is situated north of Carey Glacier and Gabare Glacier, east of the east-northeast ridge of Mount Landolt, and south of Razboyna Glacier. It is draining east-northeastwards to join Rutford Ice Stream northeast of Long Peak.

The glacier is named after the settlement of Drama in Southeastern Bulgaria.

== Location ==
Drama Glacier is centred at 78°43′30″S 84°16′00″W. US mapping in 1961, updated in 1988.

== See also ==
- List of glaciers in the Antarctic
- Glaciology

== Maps ==
- Vinson Massif. Scale 1:250 000 topographic map. Reston, Virginia: US Geological Survey, 1988.
- Antarctic Digital Database (ADD). Scale 1:250000 topographic map of Antarctica. Scientific Committee on Antarctic Research (SCAR). Since 1993, regularly updated.
