= Razboyna Glacier =

Glacier in Antarctica

- Location of Sentinel Range in Western Antarctica

- Location within Antarctica
- Location: Ellsworth Land
- Coordinates: 78°42′20″S 84°21′00″W
- Length: 3 nautical miles (5.6 km; 3.5 mi)
- Width: 1 nautical mile (1.9 km; 1.2 mi)
- Thickness: unknown
- Terminus: Long Peak
- Status: unknown

Sentinel Range map

Razboyna Glacier (Bulgarian: ледник Разбойна, romanized: lednik Razboyna, IPA: [ˈlɛdnik razˈbɔjnɐ]) is the 3 nautical miles (5.6 km; 3.5 mi) long and 1 nautical mile (1.9 km; 1.2 mi) wide glacier in Petvar Heights on the southeast side of Sentinel Range in Ellsworth Mountains, Antarctica situated north of Drama Glacier, east of Kornicker Glacier, and south of the lower course of Thomas Glacier. It is draining the north slopes of Bagra Peak, and flowing northeastwards to leave the range north of Long Peak.

The feature is named after the settlements of Razboyna in northeastern and southeastern Bulgaria.

== Location ==
Razboyna Glacier is centred at 78°42′20″S 84°21′00″W. US mapping in 1988.

== See also ==
- List of glaciers in the Antarctic
- Glaciology

== Maps ==
- Vinson Massif. Scale 1:250 000 topographic map. Reston, Virginia: US Geological Survey, 1988.
- Antarctic Digital Database (ADD). Scale 1:250000 topographic map of Antarctica. Scientific Committee on Antarctic Research (SCAR). Since 1993, regularly updated.
