= Ferrell Buttress =

Ferrell Buttress (79°57′S 159°2′E) is a distinctive rock buttress, about 900 metres (3,000 ft) high, near the east end of Cranfield Icefalls, on the south side and near the terminus of Darwin Glacier in Antarctica. It was named by the Advisory Committee on Antarctic Names after Lieutenant Commander W.F. Ferrell, U.S. Navy, a pilot with the VXE-6 detachment at Darwin Glacier Field Camp in the 1978–79 field season.
