= The Antarctic Sun =

Online newspaper

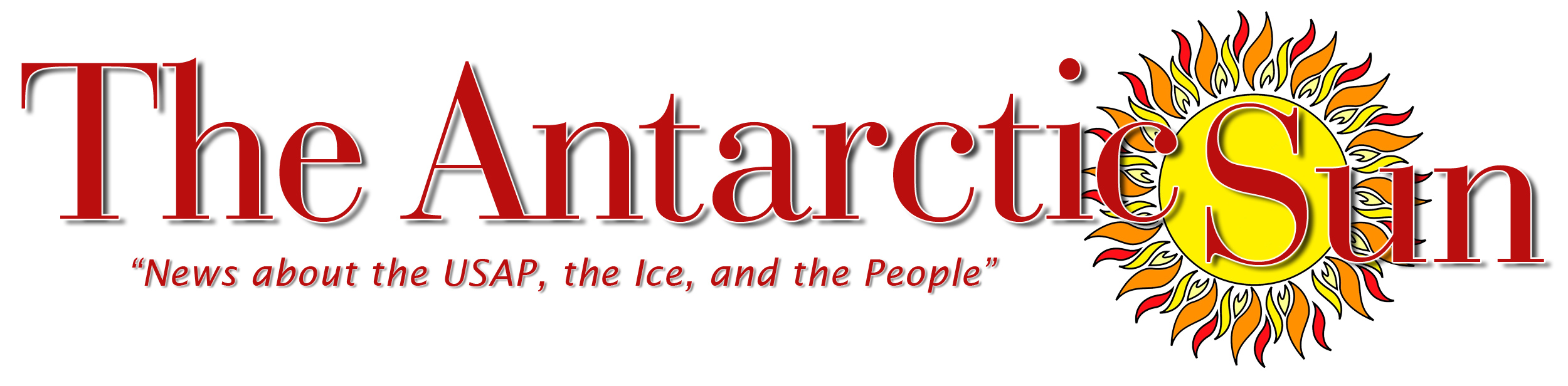
- Industry: News
- Founded: October 27, 1996
- Area served: Antarctica
- Products: Newspaper
- Number of employees: 15
- Website: antarcticsun.usap.gov

The Antarctic Sun is an online newspaper with "News about the USAP, the Ice, and the People." It is funded by the National Science Foundation (contract no. NSFDACS1219442) by its prime civilian contractor, Leidos Antarctic Support Contract.

The online publication has been covering cutting edge science for the National Science Foundation since 1997–1998 austral summer, though it can trace its history back to the 1950s when the U.S. Navy ran logistics for the USAP. From the austral summer of 1997–98 to 2006–07, The Antarctic Sun has been produced at McMurdo Station between the months of October and February. Since October 2007, it has been a year-round news website managed out of the Denver, Colorado area.

The website covers both science and features. The former includes biology, glaciology, geology, astrophysics, and oceanography, among others. Features include USAP operations, Antarctic history, and profiles on people. Since 2016, the website has also featured podcasts primarily about operations. As of 2023, The Antarctic Sun is no longer publishing new content.

== Antarctic Sun journalists ==
In order of tenure, from most recent:

- Lauren Lipuma
- Mike Lucibella
- Peter Rejcek
- Steven Profaizer
- Steve Martaindale
- Emily Stone
- Brien Barnett
- Kris Kuenning
- Melanie Conner
- Mark Sabbatini
- Kristan Hutchison
- Beth Minneci
- Jeff Inglis
- Josh Landis
- Aaron Spitzer
- Ginny Figlar
- Alexander Colhoun
