= McCarthy Inlet =

- Location within Antarctica
- Coordinates: 78°50′S 45°0′W

McCarthy Inlet is an ice-filled inlet which is the largest and northernmost of three inlets indenting the eastern side of Berkner Island, Antarctica. It was discovered by U.S. ground and flying personnel at Ellsworth Station (1957–58) under Captain Finn Ronne of the U.S. Navy Reserve (USNR), and was named by the Advisory Committee on Antarctic Names for Lieutenant Commander Charles J. McCarthy, USNR, commander of the U.S. Navy Squadron VX-6 aircraft unit at Ellsworth Station during this period.
