= Petvar Heights =

Plateau in Antarctica

Location of Sentinel Range in Western Antarctica.

Sentinel Range map.

Petvar Heights (Bulgarian: Петварски възвишения, romanized: Petvarski vazvisheniya, IPA: [ˈpɛtvarski vɐzviˈʃɛnijɐ]) are the heights rising to 2492 m at Mount Mullen in southeast Sentinel Range, Ellsworth Mountains in Antarctica. The heights occupy an oval shaped area with a diameter of 21 km, separated from the rest of Sentinel Range by Wessbecher Glacier to the southwest, Kasilag Pass to the west, and Kornicker Glacier to the northwest and north. Their interior is drained by Hudman, Carey, Razboyna, Gabare and Divdyadovo Glaciers.

The heights are named after the settlement of Petvar in Southern Bulgaria.

== Location ==
Petvar Heights are centred at 78°46′30″S 84°20′20″W. US mapping in 1961, updated in 1988.

== Maps ==
- Vinson Massif. Scale 1:250 000 topographic map. Reston, Virginia: US Geological Survey, 1988.
- Antarctic Digital Database (ADD). Scale 1:250000 topographic map of Antarctica. Scientific Committee on Antarctic Research (SCAR). Since 1993, regularly updated.

== See also ==
- Mountains in Antarctica

Geographical features include:

- Bagra Peak
- Carey Glacier
- Divdyadovo Glacier
- Fruzhin Peak
- Gabare Glacier
- Hudman Glacier
- Kasilag Pass
- Kornicker Glacier
- Long Peak
- Malkoch Peak
- Marze Peak
- Miller Peak
- Mount Landolt
- Mount Mullen
- Mountainview Ridge
- Razboyna Glacier
- Ruset Peak
- Thomas Glacier
- Wessbecher Glacier
