= Mountainview Ridge =

Location of Vinson Massif in Western Antarctica.

Central and southern Sentinel Range map.

Mountainview Ridge (78°55′S 83°42′W) is a gentle ice-covered ridge which forms the southeast extremity of Petvar Heights and the Sentinel Range in the Ellsworth Mountains, Antarctica. It was so named by the University of Minnesota Geological Party in 1963–64, because an excellent view of the high peaks of the Sentinel Range was obtained from the ridge.

== Maps ==
- Vinson Massif. Scale 1:250 000 topographic map. Reston, Virginia: US Geological Survey, 1988.
- Antarctic Digital Database (ADD). Scale 1:250000 topographic map of Antarctica. Scientific Committee on Antarctic Research (SCAR). Since 1993, regularly updated.
