= Kelley Peak =

Mountain in Antarctica

Kelley Peak (Antarctica)
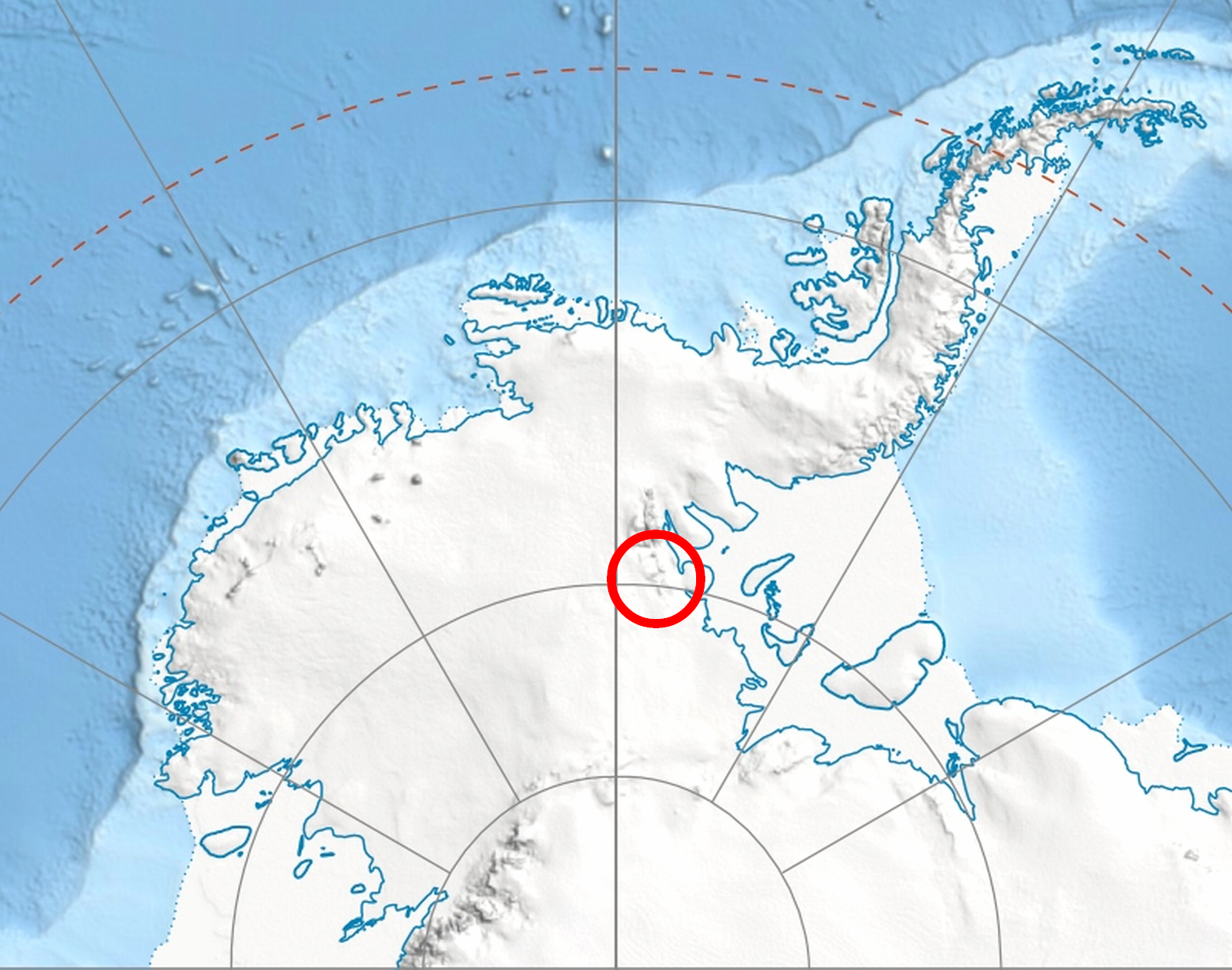
- Location of Kelley Peak in the Heritage Range, West Antarctica

Highest point
- Elevation: 1,710 metres (5,600 ft)
- Coordinates: 80°10′S 82°50′W

Geography
- Location: West Antarctica
- Parent range: Heritage Range

Climbing
- Easiest route: basic snow/ice climb

Kelley Peak is a peak, 1,710 metres (5,600 ft) high, forming the south end of the Liberty Hills in the Heritage Range, Antarctica. It was named by the Advisory Committee on Antarctic Names for air crewman Charles C. Kelley of the United States Navy who perished in the crash of the LC-47 aircraft on the Ross Ice Shelf on February 2, 1966.

== See also ==
- Mountains in Antarctica
