= Morris Cliff =

Cliff in Antarctica

Morris Cliff (80°20′S 81°49′W) is a steep, east-facing cliff between the Marble Hills and Independence Hills in the Heritage Range of the Ellsworth Mountains in Antarctica. It was named by the Advisory Committee on Antarctic Names for Lieutenant Harold M. Morris, U.S. Navy, a pilot of LC-47 aircraft, who perished in a crash on the Ross Ice Shelf, February 2, 1966.
