= Mount Landolt =

Mountain in Ellsworth Land, Antarctica

Location of Sentinel Range in Western Antarctica.

Sentinel Range map.

Mount Landolt (78°46′S 84°30′W) is a mountain, 2,280 metres (7,480 ft) high, standing at the head of Hudman Glacier in the Petvar Heights at the southeastern extremity of the Sentinel Range in the Ellsworth Mountains of Antarctica. It was first mapped by the United States Geological Survey from surveys and U.S. Navy air photos from 1957 to 1959, and was named by the Advisory Committee on Antarctic Names for Arlo U. Landolt, an aurora scientist at the International Geophysical Year South Pole Station in 1957.

== See also ==
- Mountains in Antarctica

== Maps ==
- Vinson Massif. Scale 1:250 000 topographic map. Reston, Virginia: US Geological Survey, 1988.
- Antarctic Digital Database (ADD). Scale 1:250000 topographic map of Antarctica. Scientific Committee on Antarctic Research (SCAR). Since 1993, regularly updated.
