= Long Peak =

Mountain in Antarctica

Location of Sentinel Range in Western Antarctica.

Sentinel Range map.

Long Peak (78°44′S 83°54′W) is a bare rock peak, 1,200 metres (4,000 ft) high, on the extended ridge line, 7 nautical miles (13 km) east-northeast of Mount Landolt in the Petvar Heights of the southeast Sentinel Range in the Ellsworth Mountains of Antarctica. It overlooks the lower courses of Drama Glacier to the north and Gabare Glacier to the south. The peak was mapped by the United States Geological Survey from surveys and U.S. Navy aerial photographs from 1957 to 1959, and was named by the Advisory Committee on Antarctic Names in 1984 after James W. Long, a National Science Foundation physician and consultant on Antarctic health matters for 10 years.

== Maps ==
- Vinson Massif. Scale 1:250 000 topographic map. Reston, Virginia: US Geological Survey, 1988.
- Antarctic Digital Database (ADD). Scale 1:250000 topographic map of Antarctica. Scientific Committee on Antarctic Research (SCAR). Since 1993, regularly updated.
