= Hudman Glacier =

Glacier in Antarctica

- Location of Vinson Massif in Western Antarctica

- Location within Antarctica
- Type: tributary
- Location: Ellsworth Land
- Coordinates: 78°54′00″S 84°12′00″W
- Thickness: unknown
- Terminus: Minnesota Glacier
- Status: unknown

Central and southern Sentinel Range map.

Hudman Glacier (78°54′S 84°12′W) is a glacier draining south of Mount Landolt between Marze Peak and Miller Peak in Petvar Heights at the south end of the Sentinel Range, in the Ellsworth Mountains of Antarctica, flowing south-southeast to Minnesota Glacier. It was mapped by the United States Geological Survey from surveys and U.S. Navy air photos, 1957–59, and was named by the Advisory Committee on Antarctic Names for Captain Rayburn A. Hudman, United States Marine Corps, who died in the crash of a Lockheed P2V-2n Neptune, modified for extreme range, flying in sub zero temperatures and Ski equipped for landing on the Ice runways at McMurdo Sound Antarctica on 18 October 1956.

== See also ==
- List of glaciers in the Antarctic
- Glaciology

== Maps ==
- Vinson Massif. Scale 1:250 000 topographic map. Reston, Virginia: US Geological Survey, 1988.
- Antarctic Digital Database (ADD). Scale 1:250000 topographic map of Antarctica. Scientific Committee on Antarctic Research (SCAR). Since 1993, regularly updated.
