= Marze Peak =

Mountain in Antarctica

Coordinates: 78°52′S 84°30′W

Location of Sentinel Range in Western Antarctica.

Sentinel Range map.

Marze Peak is a rock peak with twin summits near the south end of the ridge between Wessbecher Glacier and Hudman Glacier, in the Petvar Heights at the south end of the Sentinel Range, Ellsworth Mountains, Antarctica. It was mapped by the United States Geological Survey from surveys and U.S. Navy air photos from 1957 to 1959, and was named by the Advisory Committee on Antarctic Names for Marion O. Marze, an aviation machinist's mate from the U.S. Navy who perished in the crash of a P2V Neptune airplane at McMurdo Sound on October 18, 1956.

== See also ==
- Mountains in Antarctica

== Maps ==
- Vinson Massif. Scale 1:250 000 topographic map. Reston, Virginia: US Geological Survey, 1988.
- Antarctic Digital Database (ADD). Scale 1:250000 topographic map of Antarctica. Scientific Committee on Antarctic Research (SCAR). Since 1993, regularly updated.
