= Carey Glacier =

Glacier in Antarctica

- Location of Vinson Massif in Western Antarctica

- Location within Antarctica
- Type: tributary
- Location: Ellsworth Land
- Coordinates: 78°53′S 83°55′W
- Thickness: unknown
- Terminus: Minnesota Glacier
- Status: unknown

Carey Glacier (78°53′S 83°55′W) is a glacier on the east side of Miller and Fruzhin Peaks and west of Ruset and Malkoch Peaks in Petvar Heights at the southeast end of the Sentinel Range, Ellsworth Mountains, flowing southeast to Minnesota Glacier. It was mapped by the United States Geological Survey from surveys and from U.S. Navy air photos, 1957–59, and named by the Advisory Committee on Antarctic Names for Lieutenant David W. Carey, pilot with U.S. Navy Squadron VX-6, who was killed in the crash of a P2V Neptune airplane at McMurdo Sound in October 1956.

== See also ==
- List of glaciers in the Antarctic
- Glaciology

== Maps ==
- Vinson Massif. Scale 1:250 000 topographic map. Reston, Virginia: US Geological Survey, 1988.
- Antarctic Digital Database (ADD). Scale 1:250000 topographic map of Antarctica. Scientific Committee on Antarctic Research (SCAR). Since 1993, regularly updated.
