= Miller Peak (Sentinel Range) =

Mountain in Ellsworth Land, Antarctica

Coordinates: 78°49′S 84°14′W

Location of Sentinel Range in Western Antarctica.

Sentinel Range map.

Miller Peak is a peak with twin summits on the central part of the ridge between Hudman Glacier and Carey Glacier, in the Petvar Heights at the southern end of the Sentinel Range in the Ellsworth Mountains, Antarctica. It was first mapped by the United States Geological Survey from surveys and U.S. Navy air photos from 1957 to 1959. It was named by the Advisory Committee on Antarctic Names after Charles S. Miller, a U.S. Navy aviation electronics technician who was killed in a crash of a P2V Neptune airplane at McMurdo Sound in October 1956.

== See also ==
- Mountains in Antarctica

== Maps ==
- Vinson Massif. Scale 1:250 000 topographic map. Reston, Virginia: US Geological Survey, 1988.
- Antarctic Digital Database (ADD). Scale 1:250000 topographic map of Antarctica. Scientific Committee on Antarctic Research (SCAR). Since 1993, regularly updated.
