= Cheltenham Football Club =

English football club

Cheltenham

Names
- Full name: Cheltenham Football Netball Club
- Nickname: Rosellas

Club details
- Founded: 1891; 135 years ago
- Colours
- Competition: Southern Football Netball League
- Coach: Des Ryan
- Captain: Jack Worrell
- Premierships: 12(1909, 1913, 1915, 1922, 1925, 1934, 1992, 1993, 1995, 2023, 2024, 2025
- Ground: Jack Barker Oval – Cheltenham Recreational Reserve

Uniforms
Home

Other information
- Official website: cheltenhamfc.com.au

The Cheltenham Football Club is an Australian rules football club from Melbourne, that was founded in 1891 and currently plays in Division 1 of the Southern Football Netball League.

== History ==
As early as 1891, the "Cheltenham Football Club" regularly played football matches, often travelling long distances from their southern Melbourne base to play country teams such as Ballarat.

The Cheltenham home games were played on a paddock on the corner of Park and Charman roads in Cheltenham. In 1909, the club moved to its current home at the Cheltenham Recreational Reserve on Weatherall Road.

Also in 1909, Cheltenham entered in the newly formed Federal Association and became the inaugural Federal Association premiers. The club continued its affiliation with this league for many decades, even fielding an open age team during the war years.

Cheltenham went on to win five senior premierships in the Federal Association by the end of the 1920s, they won the flags in 1909, 1911, 1913, 1922 and 1925, with the late Percy Watt playing in all 5 premiership sides and was captain in 1922.

Cheltenham continued to win premierships in the 1920s and 1930s with juniors taking out the 1929 and 1933 flags, and that continued in 1934 when the club took out the 1st XVIII and 2nd XVIII premierships.

The 1940s saw new Cheltenham legends starting their careers. Jack Barker, Jim Sloss, Jeff Farnbach, Eric Whitecross, Jim Brooks, and Norm Wilson, all giving Cheltenham great service during the 1940s and 1950s. Cheltenham produced its only Brownlow Medallist in Peter Box who played in the late 1940s, before going to the Footscray Football Club where he became a champion.

Cheltenham continued to show its strength in the 1940s, but were runner ups in the 1st XVIII in 1946 and also runners up in the juniors in 1942, 1948 and 1949. Cheltenham continued to field sides during the war years 1939–1945.

The early 1950s saw Arthur Rose at the helm as coach until 1952, and then John Hogan arrived from North Melbourne in 1953. Cheltenham won a 2nd XVIII premiership in 1958 led by coach Jim Ostle.

1959 saw all 3 Cheltenham sides making the finals with the 3rd XVIII finishing runners up and with Kevin Roberts and Bob Arnfield finishing 1st and 2nd in the 1st XVIII Federal Association best and fairest, and Jack Barker winning the best and fairest in the Federal Association 2nd XVIII.

The 1960s saw Peter Lucas and Arthur Gooch from Collingwood showing their presence, with Cheltenham being beaten by a kick after the siren against Springvale in the 1960 preliminary final. Cheltenham had great success with their junior sides winning the 3rd XVIII premierships in 1967, 1968, and the 4th XVIII premiers in 1962 and 1968.

The 1970s saw the 1st XVIII play off in the 2 grand finals, the first under coach Tommy New in 1974, saw Cheltenham go down by 1 point to Highett and in 1976, under coach Ian Cooper, lost to Mentone by 6 points. The 3rd XVIII went through the season undefeated in 1974 winning the premiership, with Trevor Barker a key player before going to St Kilda the following year. The 3rd XVIII under coach Jack Hammond in 1975 and the 4ths in 1973, 1975, and 1978 were runners up. Cheltenham had mixed success in the 1980s with Ross Embon taking the 1st XVIII into the finals in 1980. The great Gerry Callaghan, who had coached Williamstown and played in 5 premierships for them, was Cheltenham's last senior coach when the Federal Association ended in 1981.

Cheltenham then joined the South East Suburban Football League under Gerry's coaching in 1982 and he was able to help them become a force in later years with Cheltenham making the finals in the seniors in 1984, 1985, and 1986 and the 4th XVIII taking out the 1981 premiership.

The club won the 2nd Division premiership in 1992, the first of name changed Southern Football League. They were not promoted into 1st division because of the merger with the East Suburban Churches Football Association in 1993.

The 1990s brought back memories of Cheltenham's early years with the club winning 3 senior premierships under coach Barry White in 1992, 1993, and 1995. Cheltenham was very successful in 1995 winning both the 1st XVIII and 4th XVIII premierships and was runner up in 2nd XVIII. The 3rd XVIII were premiers in 1996 and runners up in 1997 under coach Jeff Lyon, who had worked tirelessly recruiting junior players to the club.

Former Richmond and Essendon player Brian Winton took over the coaching duties in 1996 and lead the club to the finals in his first year and then again in 1999. Barry White returned to coach the club in both 2000 and 2001, but not with the success of his early years. David Selleck and David Kilburn showed their skills as coaches in 2000 and 2001 when they led the 3rd XVIII to back-to-back premierships.

Andrew Butterfield took the seniors reins in 2002 and 2003. In 2003 season club stalwart Stephen Kneen took on the enormous task of president, secretary and treasurer all in the same year. Steve 'Spider' Kennedy was appointed senior coach in 2004, and Neil Hassel in 2005.

Season 2006 saw former player Brett Shalders take over as senior coach. In a big turnaround from previous seasons, the Rosellas finished third with a 14–4 record and in the process won the SFL Division 1 Club Championship. The Rosellas once again made the finals in 2007, finishing 3rd with a 12–6 record, but fell to Clayton with the last kick of the day in the first semi-final. Having finished in third place after the home and away season in 2008, Cheltenham defeated Clayton in the first semifinal only to be defeated a week later by St Paul's East Bentleigh in the Preliminary Final. There was some cause for celebration when the Rosella Colts defeated Hampton to win their second premiership in succession. Ruckman Ewen McKenzie capped off a stellar first season at the club by winning the SFL Division 1 Best and Fairest award.

After missing the finals for the first time in five seasons in 2010, former Melbourne defender Nathan Brown took over the coaching reins and led the Rosellas side back to September action. In the Elimination Final, Cheltenham defeated preseason flag favourite Chelsea Heights before falling a week later to St Kilda City in the first semifinal.

On September 17, 2010, Jack Barker died. Over 400 games in the red yellow and black, a committee member and life member, Barker was Cheltenham through and through at both football and cricket clubs. Even in his later years Jack was still a regular around the local football grounds attending as many football matches as he could to watch his footy teams of the Saints, Zebras or Rosellas on a Saturday afternoon. Barker was thrilled to have the club ground named in his honor after many years of rallying by the club committee. On the day of the announcement, many friends and family, Cheltenham, and St. Kilda players came to see the unveiling of Jack's name on the side of the pavilion.

At the start of season 2013, the club entered a female netball team.

During the season of 2014 the club committee, past and present players were saddened with the passing of barman and club stalwart Steve King. Over many years Steve's commitment to the club was admired by many with a large gathering attending his funeral service. The club has honoured King by naming the club bar after him.

In season 2015 the club celebrated 125 years with a big reunion of former and present-day players, supporters and families at the club rooms. Many players from all different eras attended the night to reminisce about the old days.

Long-time secretary Colin Anderson stood down from the role after a consecutive 11 seasons but continued on as president for a 5th season.

At the end of season 2015 senior coach Andrew Butterfield stepped aside to be replaced by former Richmond player Des Ryan as senior coach. The club went on a big recruiting drive with Ryan using many of his contacts to recruit players to Jack Barker Oval.

2016 was generally a disappointing season for the Rosellas. On a positive note, many under 19 players were promoted to the senior team where they gained some valuable experience. 2016 saw club stalwart and long time President Colin Anderson step down after five years in the role and many years on the committee as Secretary. New President was John Graham along with a rejuvenated committee at Jack Barker Oval.

Senior coach Des Ryan was joined at the club by brother Stephen as an assistant coach and with a host of new recruits for the 2017 season. Former AFL Sydney Swans listed player Sean McLaren joined the club alongside senior players Will McTaggert, Daniel Harrison, Richard Ryan and Ange Soldatas. The 2017 season proved disappointing again for the Rosellas, following a mid-year form slump. However, the side rallied late in the season to win their final five games, giving the Rosellas promise for the 2018 season. A highlight for the club also saw the senior team run out on Anzac Day in the SFNL's annual Anzac commemorative match in an Anzac tribute jumper; a first in the club's history.

In season 2019 the seniors made the final five after a few years of absence. Defeating East Malvern and Dingley the seniors made it through to the SFNL Division 1 Grand Final for the first time since in many years. After defeating Dingley in the 2nd semi-final the Dingoes were a bit too strong and experienced for a youthful Rosellas. The grand finale was played at RSEA Park Linton St Moorabbin on a very windy day which made scoring very difficult.

In 2020 the club celebrated 130 years of the Football club which now fields seniors, reserves, thirds and under 19's men's football teams and five senior female netball teams.

There is an alignment with the Cheltenham Panthers Junior Football Club, which fields junior teams in the South Metropolitan Junior Football League.

At the conclusion of the 2022 season, Brad Berry was appointed as the Director of Coaching.

== Premierships ==
=== Seniors ===
- Federal League / Association (6): 1909, 1911, 1913, 1922, 1925, 1934
- South East Suburban Football League (1): 1992
- Southern Football League (5): 1993, 1995, 2023, 2024, 2025

=== Reserves ===
- Federal League / Association (2): 1934, 1958
- Southern Football League (3): 2010, 2017, 2023

=== Thirds ===
- Southern Football League (2): 2009, 2018

=== Under 18/19s ===
- Federal League / Association (7): 1928, 1929, 1930, 1933, 1967, 1973, 1974
- Southern Football League (4): 1996, 2000, 2001, 2008
- Mornington Peninsula Nepean Football League (1): 2007

=== Under 16s ===
- Federal League / Association (4): 1942, 1962, 1968, 1981

=== Netball ===
- Southern Football League (2): 2016, 2018

== Best and Fairests ==
Year	Seniors	Reserves	Under 18/19s	Thirds	Netball
1962	B.Anderson	J.Barker	A.Rainey	J.McEwen	
1963	G.Turton	B.Arnott	V.Ellis	L.Yates	
1964	I.Shepherd	W.Foley	L.Yates	S.Ginn	
1965	P.Twyford	F.Hutchinson	R.Turner	W.Green	
1966	M.Hewitt	R.Brearley	J.Antonie	J.Woolhouse	
1967	M.Ould	L.Yates	J.Antonie	J.Woolhouse	
1968	R.Brearley	R.Wills	W.Higgs	C.Antonie	
1969	E.Williams	R.Newman	M.Lewis	G.Watts	
1970	M.Ward	H.Nicol	M.Campbell	I.Lines	
1971	L.Woodward	W.Warburton	C.Bartram	P.Wilkie	
1972	M.Hewitt	G.Ansell	G.Walker	T.Barker	
1973	B.Dingle	M.Grimmer	T.Barker	M.Roberts	
1974	M.Hewitt	M.Grimmer	T.Barker	S.Emmitt	
1975	J.Austin	E.Williams	P.Sheppard	S.Upton	
1976	G.Dunn	I.Brown	S.Emmitt	W.Smirdell	
1977	B.Hillier	M.Rodwell	R.Cunningham	C.Upton	
1978	M.Donnell	A.Webster	S.Tanian	J.Burke	
1979	G.Ansell	K.Ellis	G.Kelly	P.O'Brien	
1980	R.Embom	M.Shaw	J.Burke	R.Blainey	
1981	D.Caddaye	R.Carruthers	P.Rocke	G.Blainey	
1982	A.Roche	A.Jelleff	R.Blainey	D.O'Riley	
1983	R.Powely	K.Eastwood	M.Jones	J.Clagnan	
1984	T.Ryan	K.Eastwood	R.O'Brien		
1985	L.Caddaye	A.Jelleff	N.McKenzie		
1986	P.Jeans	M.Shaw			
1987	B.McConnell	S.Bawden	R.Aitken		
1988	B.McConnell	D.Kilburn	C.Mason	S.Kneen	
1989	B.McConnell	S.Ellery	B.Campbell		
1990	P.Finlay	S.Ellery			
1991	S.MacKinnon	S.Ellery			
1992	P.Jeans	P.Joyce			
1993	A.Jelleff	B.Crimmin	T.Drinan		
1994	A.Thomas	G.Duckworth			
1995	A.Thomas	P.Goodchild	S.Nish/S.Rowe		
1996	A.Thomas	P.Fielding	M.Rand	M.Spiliotis	
1997	M.Goodchild	W.Jones	W.Wells		
1998	M.Rand	A.Jelleff	J.Mills		
1999	M.Szakacs	B.Crimmin	C.Saddington	P.Groves	
2000	M.Robinson	D.Hughes/C.Saddington	R.Everett		
2001	S.Rowe	S.Clifford/D.Keller	C.Jowett		
2002	A.Daff	C.Sendeckyj			
2003	M.Shalders	C.Sendeckyj/S.Croft			
2004	A.Shilton	D.Schwarze			
2005	J.McGeoch	P.Nunn			
2006	M.Shalders	S.Farnsworth			
2007	M.Shalders	P.Conroy	S.Goodman		
2008	E.McKenzie	D.Macklin	C.Neophitou (Rosellas); L.Woolley (Cockatoos)		
2009	A.Cole	D.Ferguson	J.Jones	R.Mahony	
2010	A.Symes	A.Butterfield	D.Vaughan	A.Pullman	
2011	J.Martin	C.Johnston		C.Tuck	
2012	B.Keast	L.Brookman		M.Ross	
2013	C.Neophitou	J.Lee		T.Lawson	M.Green
2014	P.Bolger	L.Walsh	M.Hampton	E.Hughes	S.Lynch
2015	D.Vaughan	T.Lawson	J.Kilner	M.Crossley	S.Preusche (Div. 5); B.Miller (Div. 6)
2016	J.Worrell	T.Lawson	B.Clark-Henry	A.Cilia	M.Green (Div. 5); B.Miller (Div. 8)
2017	S.McLaren	A.Milesi	A.Malamas	A.Cilia	T.McKay (Div. 5); J.Lamb (Div. 7)
2018					

== AFL / VFL Recruits from Cheltenham ==
- 1898 - Joseph Chandler – South Melbourne, 3 Games, 2 Goals.
- 1910 - Francis Biehl – South Melbourne, 3 Games, 1 Goal.
- 1914–19 - Steve Leehane – Carlton, 82 Games, 14 Goals.
- 1927–37 - Clarrie Lonsdale – Hawthorn, 109 Games, 122 Goals.
- 1932–37 - Archie Roberts – Melbourne, Essendon, 48 Games, 0 Goals.
- 1933–45 - Ted Rippon – Essendon, St Kilda, 85 Games, 31 Goals.
- 1936–37 - Clem Neeson – Carlton, St Kilda, 13 Games, 2 Goals.
- 1937–40 - Arthur Rose – St Kilda, 28 Games, 2 Goals.
- 1942–46 - Bill Butler – St Kilda, 58 Games, 0 Goals.
- 1942 - George Tanner – St Kilda, 2 Games, 0 Goals.
- 1950 - Brian Leary – Hawthorn, 2 Games, 0 Goals.
- 1951–57 - Peter Box – Footscray Brownlow Medallist, 107 Games 43 Goals.
- 1953–61 - Ron Porta – Footscray, South Melbourne, 84 Games, 2 Goals.
- 1960 - John Hogan – St Kilda, 2 Games, 0 Goals.
- 1960–68 - Kevin Roberts – St Kilda, 106 Games, 110 Goals.
- 1965–69 - Vaughan Ellis – Collingwood, 19 Games, 3 Goals.
- 1966–68 - Jack Austin – St Kilda, Fitzroy, 9 Games, 6 Goals
- 1968–71 - Colin Antonie – St Kilda, 17 Games, Goals: 7
- 1975–89 - Trevor Barker – St Kilda, 230 Games 134 Goals.
- 1975–80 - Colin Carter – St Kilda, 49 Games, 16 Goals.
- 1982 - Neil Park – St Kilda, 3 Games, 5 Goals.
- 1982 - Ern Trickey – Fitzroy, South Melbourne, 3 Games, 5 Goals.
- 1998 - John Hynes – Carlton, 4 Games, 2 Goals.
