= 2014 Little League Softball World Series results =

The results of the 2014 Little League Softball World Series will be determined between August 6 and August 13, 2014 in Portland, Oregon. 10 teams were divided into two groups, both with five teams from the United States and international teams.

All times shown are US EDT.◄

Pool Play
Pool A	(Oregon) ORD4 1 (Ohio) OH 10◄ linescore	(Puerto Rico) PUR 7◄ (Czech Republic) CZE 1 linescore	(Ohio) OH 9◄ (Czech Republic) CZE 1 linescore	(Georgia (U.S. state)) GA 11◄ (Oregon) ORD4 0 (F/4) linescore	(Puerto Rico) PUR 0 (Georgia (U.S. state)) GA 1◄ linescore	(Czech Republic) CZE 5 (Oregon) ORD4 7◄ linescore	(Puerto Rico) PUR 1 (Oregon) ORD4 2◄ linescore	(Ohio) OH 3 (Georgia (U.S. state)) GA 6◄ linescore	(Czech Republic) CZE 4 (F/4) (Georgia (U.S. state)) GA 14◄ linescore	(Puerto Rico) PUR 1 (Ohio) OH 4◄ linescore
Pool B	(Canada) CAN 0 (New Jersey) NJ 3◄ linescore	(Canada) CAN 1 (Louisiana) LA 8◄ linescore	(Louisiana) LA 5◄ (California) CA 4 linescore	(Philippines) PHI 1 (F/5) (Canada) CAN 11◄ linescore	(California) CA 1 (Canada) CAN 8◄ linescore	(New Jersey) NJ 12◄ (Louisiana) LA 1 (F/4) linescore	(Louisiana) LA 4◄ (Philippines) PHI 2 linescore	(New Jersey) NJ 11◄ (California) CA 1 (F/5) linescore	Philippines forfeited first two games.	
Consolation Round
5th-10th	Czech Republic 7◄ Philippines 4 linescore			Puerto Rico 11◄ California 2 linescore			Oregon D4 1 Canada 9◄ linescore			
Elimination Round
Semifinals	(Georgia (U.S. state)) Georgia 1 Louisiana 2◄ linescore					New Jersey 11◄ Ohio 1 (F/5) linescore				
3rd Place	Ohio 4 (Georgia (U.S. state)) Georgia 6◄ linescore									
World Championship	Louisiana 1 New Jersey 4◄ linescore									
