= Ray Cross =

Australian rules footballer

Personal information
- Full name: Raymond L. Cross
- Born: 7 September 1941
- Original team: Omeo/East Hampton
- Height: 180 cm (5 ft 11 in)
- Weight: 83 kg (183 lb)
- Position: Defender

Playing career^{1}
Years	Club	Games (Goals)
1962–1967	St Kilda	57 (4)
- ^{1} Playing statistics correct to the end of 1967.

Raymond Cross (born 7 September 1941) is a former Australian rules footballer who played with St Kilda in the Victorian Football League (VFL).

Cross was a half back flanker during his league career, but played on the half forward flank against Essendon in the 1965 VFL Grand Final, having come into the side in place of the injured Kevin Roberts. His role on grand final day was to tag Hugh Mitchell but his efforts couldn't stop St Kilda losing by 35 points.

He was hampered by knee injuries while at St Kilda and it was a strained knee ligament which meant he didn't participate in his clubs drought breaking premiership in 1966.

Cross's grandson, Paddy Cross, currently plays for the Melbourne Football Club.
