= Federal Football League =

Former sports league in Australia

- Formerly: Federal Football Association (1909−32); Federal District Football League (1932−62)
- Sport: Australian rules football
- Founded: 1909
- Folded: 1981; 45 years ago
- Country: Australia
- Most titles: Moorabbin (12)

The Federal Football League (FFL), also known simply as the Federal League, was an Australian rules football competition in the south-eastern suburbs of Melbourne, Victoria. The competition was in existence from 1909 to 1981 and was regarded as one of the strongest metropolitan leagues in Melbourne.

It is said that, in the mid-1960s, Channel 7 was seeking to telecast FFL games on a Sunday.

== History ==
=== Formation ===
Formed in 1909 as the Federal Football Association (FFA), the competition's eight founding members were Cheltenham, Ellindale, Elsternwick, Frankston, Mentone, Mordialloc, Moorabbin, and Glen Huntly, all from the southern/south eastern suburbs.

Local Councillor F. T. Le Page was elected president.

=== History ===
In 1915, the Federal football Association (FFA) A. Grade teams were - Brighton District, Moorabbin, Cheltenham, Moorabbin Park, Oakleigh and Elsternwick, whilst the B. Grade clubs were Sandringham, Mentone, Heatherton and Glenhuntly.

In 1925, the FFA comprised 10 senior and 9 junior club's and had over 1,000 registered players.

In 1937 the A Section competition teams were composed of - Black Rock, Mordialloc, Cheltenham, East Burwood, Moorabbin, Caulfield, Darling and Mentone, and in the B section, Chelsea, Highett, Mt. Waverley, Mordialloc, Black Rock and Edithvale-Aspendale.

Middle Brighton FC kicked 50.40 - 340 v Heatherton: 0.0 - 0 in a match in 1914.

== Clubs ==
=== Final clubs ===
Nine clubs competed in the FFL's final season.

Club	Colours	Nickname	Home Ground	Former League	Est.	Years in FFL	FFL senior premierships		Fate
Club	Colours	Nickname	Home Ground	Former League	Est.	Years in FFL	Total	Years	Fate
Cheltenham		Rosellas	Cheltenham Recreation Reserve, Cheltenham	–	1895	1909–1928; 1930–1981	6	1909, 1911, 1913, 1922, 1925, 1934	Moved to South East Suburban FL in 1982
Clayton		Clays	Clayton Reserve, Clayton	DDFA	1908	1954–1981	2	1980, 1981	Moved to South East Suburban FL in 1982
Highett		Bulldogs	Highett Reserve, Highett	–	1929	1934–1981	4	1971, 1973, 1974, 1979	Moved to South East Suburban FL in 1982
Mentone		Tigers	Mentone Reserve, Mentone	–	1900s	1909; 1913–1914; 1920–1981	5	1928, 1956, 1967, 1968, 1976	Moved to South East Suburban FL in 1982
Moorabbin (II)		Kangas	McKinnon Reserve, McKinnon	–	1979	1979–1981	0	-	Moved to South East Suburban FL in 1982
Noble Park		Bulls	Pat Wright Senior Oval, Noble Park	SESFL	1918	1964–1981	1	1972	Moved to South East Suburban FL in 1982
Oakleigh District		Districts	Princes Highway Reserve, Oakleigh East	SESFL	1950	1964–1981	0	-	Moved to South East Suburban FL in 1982
Parkdale		Seagulls	Gerry Green Reserve, Parkdale	VAFA	1934	1930-1932, 1955–1981	1	1978	Moved to South East Suburban FL in 1982
Springvale		Demons	Springvale Reserve, Springvale	CODFL	1903	1957–1981	7	1960, 1961, 1962, 1963, 1965, 1975, 1977	Moved to VFA in 1982

=== Former clubs ===
Club	Colours	Nickname	Home Ground	Former League	Est.	Years in FFL	FFL senior premierships		Fate
Club	Colours	Nickname	Home Ground	Former League	Est.	Years in FFL	Total	Years	Fate
Aspendale			Aspendale Racecourse, Aspendale	–	1924	1924-1930	0	-	Merged with Edithvale to form Edithvale-Aspendale in 1931
Bentleigh (Ellindale 1909-14)		Demons	Bentleigh Reserve, Bentleigh	SDFA, CODFL	1919	1909-1912, 1914, 1920–1928, 1957-1978	0	-	Moved to VAFA after 1928 season. Merged with McKinnon to form Moorabbin in 1979
Black Rock		Jets	Donald MacDonald Reserve, Beaumaris	–	1908	1913–1914; 1919–1926; 1931–1972	3	1935, 1936, 1954	Entered recess in 1973; re-formed in YCWFL in 1976
Middle Brighton(Brighton Districts 1920-21)			William Street Reserve, Brighton	–		1913-1915; 1919-1921, 1927	3	1915, 1920, 1921	Merged with Brighton in 1928
Brightonvale			Hurlingham Park, Brighton	–		1929	0	-	Senior team entered recess in 1930
Camden (Camden Town 1912-14)			Princes Park, Caulfield South	–		1912-1914, 1939–1956	0	-	Merged with South Caulfield CYMS to form South Caulfield in 1957
Carnegie		Tigers	Koornang Park, Carnegie	VFLSD	1920s	1932-1934	0	-	Moved to VAFA in 1935
Carrum			Keast Park, Seaford	–	1909	1911; 1922–1927	0	-	Folded in 1928; re-formed in Peninsula & District FA in 1932
Carrum-Chelsea			Paddock on Breeze St, Bonbeach	–	1911	1912-1914	0	-	Entered recess in 1915
Chelsea		Seagulls	Chelsea Recreation Reserve, Chelsea	–	1919	1919–1958	1	1955	Moved to Mornington Peninsula FL in 1959
Dandenong (I)			Dandenong Showgrounds, Dandenong	BDFA	1874	1930, 1934	0	-	1931-33, 1935-36 unknown. Moved to Dandenong District FA in 1937.
Dandenong (II)		Redlegs	Dandenong Showgrounds, Dandenong	–	1951	1951–1957	1	1953	Moved to VFA in 1958
Darling			Darling Park, Malvern East	VFLSD		1934–1940	2	1937, 1938	Folded after 1940 season
Doveton		Doves	Robinson Reserve, Doveton	SWGFL	1959	1972–1976	0	-	Returned to South West Gippsland FL in 1977
East Burwood		Rams	East Burwood Reserve, Burwood East	SDFA	1910	1931–1938	1	1932	Senior team entered recess in 1939; re-formed in Eastern Suburban FL in 1945
East Caulfield (Caulfield 1932-70)		Fieldsmen	East Caulfield Reserve, Caulfield East	VFLSD	1894	1932–1976	1	1949	Folded after 1976 season
East Malvern		Demons	Waverley Oval, Malvern East	CODFL	1900s	1962–1973	4	1964, 1966, 1969, 1970	Folded after 1973 season
Edithvale			Regents Park, Aspendale	–	1900s	1921-1930	0	-	Merged with Aspendale to form Edithvale-Aspendale in 1931
Edithvale-Aspendale (Regents Park 1931-35)		Eagles	Regents Park, Aspendale	–	1931	1931-1955	0	-	Moved to Mornington Peninsula FL in 1956
Elsternwick		Wickers	Elsternwick Park, Elsternwick	–	1906	1909–1910, 1913	0	-	Moved to VAFA in 1914
Exchange						1917	0	-	
Frankston			Frankston Park, Frankston	–		1909	0	-	
Freighters (Heatherton 1913-50)		Tonners	Heatherton Recreation Reserve, Heatherton	CODFL	1913	1913–1914; 1920–1921; 1927–1928; 1946-1954	0	-	Moved to CYMSFA as Mentone CYMS in 1954
Glen Orme			Koornang Park, Carnegie	–	1946	1946-1949	0	-	Moved to Eastern Suburban FL after 1950 season
Glen Huntly		Hunters	Glen Huntly Park, Caulfield East	CODFL	1900s	1960–1976	0	-	Folded after 1976 season
Glen Huntly Amateurs			Koornang Park, Carnegie	–	1900s	1909, 1913–1915, 1920–1922	0	-	Moved to Caulfield Oakleigh District FL in 1923
Glen Waverley			Central Reserve, Glen Waverley	BDFA	1908	1930–1931	0	-	Moved to VFL Sub-District FL in 1932
Hampton			Castlefield Reserve, Hampton	–	1919	1920	0	-	Merged with various clubs to form Sandringham in 1929
McKinnon		Maccas	McKinnon Reserve, McKinnon	CODFL		1954–1977	3	1957, 1958, 1959	Entered recess in 1978; merged with Bentleigh to form Moorabbin in 1979
Moorabbin (I)		Magpies	Moorabbin Oval, Moorabbin	–	1909	1909–1950	12	1914, 1926, 1927, 1930, 1931, 1933, 1940, 1941, 1945, 1946, 1947, 1948	Moved to VFA in 1951
Moorabbin Park		Gardeners	Dane Road Reserve, Moorabbin	–		1913-1915, 1920-1928, 1930	0	-	Folded after 1930 season
Mordialloc		Bloodhounds	Ben Kavanagh Reserve, Mordialloc	–	1891	1909–1911; 1921–1957	7	1923, 1924, 1929, 1939, 1950, 1951, 1952	Moved to VFA in 1958
Mount Waverley		Mounts, Blues	Oval on corner of Springvale and High St Roads, Glen Waverley	SDFA	1924	1934-1937	0	-	Moved to Caulfield Oakleigh District FL in 1938
Murrumbeena			Frogmore Estate, Carnegie	–	1915	1915, 1921	0	-	Moved to VAFA in 1923
Navy			HMAS Cerberus	MPFL	1913	1959	0	-	Moved to Nepean FL in 1960
Oakleigh		Oaks, Devils	Warrawee Park, Oakleigh	–	1906	1915	0	-	Moved to VFL Sub-Districts in 1919
Sandringham Amateurs				–		1915–1920	0	-	Moved to VAFA in 1921
South Caulfield			Princes Park, Caulfield South	–	1957	1957–1961	0	-	Merged with Brighton in 1964
Vermont		Eagles	Vermont Reserve, Vermont	RDFA	1920	1936	0	-	Moved to Eastern Suburban FL in 1937
Victoria Brewery				–		1910–1912	2	1910, 1912	Left league in 1913
Wells Road				–	1926	1926-1929	0	-	Split from Chelsea in 1926, re-merged in 1930

=== Notes ===
- Bentleigh is not to be confused with the present-day Bentleigh Football Netball Club

== A. Grade Football Premiers / Runners Up ==
The Agar Wynne Shield. The Honourable Agar Wynne, MHR was the Federal Football Association's Patron from 1909 to 1915.

- 1909 – Cheltenham 6.6.42 d Ellindale 2.12.24
- 1910 – Victorian Brewery 10.12.72 d Mordialloc 5.9.39
- 1911 – Cheltenham 12.14.86 d Moorabbin 4.7.31
- 1912 – Victorian Brewery 6.10.46 d Moorabbin 2.12 - 24
- 1913 – Cheltenham 9.9.63 d Middle Brighton 7.10.52
- 1914 – Moorabbin 5.10.40 d Cheltenham 2.7.19
- 1915 – Brighton Districts 9.8.62 d Cheltenham 6.8.44
- 1916 to 1918 - Federal FL in recess due to World War I
- 1919 – Sandringham Amateurs 6.13.49 d Black Rock 6.10.46
- 1920 – Brighton Districts 7.7.49 d Hampton 6.10.46
- 1921 – Brighton Districts 8.12.60 d Black Rock 7.9.51
- 1922 – Cheltenham 5.10.40 v Mordialloc 4.14.38
- 1923 – Mordialloc 10.9.69 d Black Rock 2.9.21
- 1924 – Mordialloc 6.16.52 d Mentone 4.7.31 (Mordialloc undefeated premiers)
- 1925 – Cheltenham 9.6.60 d Mordialloc 5.21.51
- 1926 – Moorabbin 13.11.89 d Mordialloc 9.17 - 71
- 1927 – Moorabbin 9.11.65 d Middle Brighton 6.9.45
- 1928 – Mentone 6.14.50 d Moorabbin 5.15.45
- 1929 – Mordialloc 13.12.90 d Mentone 7.3.45
- 1930 – Moorabbin 6.11.47 d Mordialloc 5.16.46
- 1931 – Moorabbin 9.9.63 d Mordialloc 8.7.55
- 1932 – East Burwood 13.14.92 d Mentone 11.4.70
- 1933 – Moorabbin 10.26.86 d Mordialloc 10.18.78
- 1934 – Cheltenham 13.12.90 d Mordialloc 8.13.61
- 1935 – Black Rock 14.11.95 d East Burwood 11.12.78
- 1936 – Black Rock 14.9.93 d Darling 12.14.86
- 1937 – Darling 9.14.68 d Moorabbin 7.12.54
- 1938 – Darling 9.17.71 d Mordialloc 9.13.67
- 1939 – Mordialloc 14.9.93 d Moorabbin 12.13.85
- 1940 – Moorabbin 11.15.81 d Cheltenham 7.14.56
- 1941 – Moorabbin 18.16.124 d Cheltenham 11.11.77
- 1942 to 1944 - Federal FL in recess due to World War II
- 1945 – Moorabbin 14.19.103 d Camden 10.5.65
- 1946 – Moorabbin 18.17.125 d Cheltenham 9.17.71
- 1947 – Moorabbin 15.16.106 d Mordialloc 11.13.79
- 1948 – Moorabbin 19.11.125 d Camden 10.5.65
- 1949 - Caulfield 11.15.81 drew Moorabbin 11.15.81
- 1949 – Caulfield 14.10.94 d Moorabbin 11.10.76 (Grand Final Replay)
- 1950 – Mordialloc 9.9.63 d Moorabbin 7.14.56
- 1951 – Mordialloc 21.17.143 d Freighters 6.8.44
- 1952 – Mordialloc 14.7.91 d Camden 10.13.73
- 1953 – Dandenong 11.20.86 d Caulfield 9.6.60
- 1954 – Black Rock 16.17.113 d Dandenong 15.12.102
- 1955 – Chelsea 10.17.77 d Dandenong 7.12.54
- 1956 – Mentone 11.8.74 d Mordialloc 9.11.65
- 1957 – McKinnon 13.9.87 d Mordialloc 12.13.85
- 1958 – McKinnon 8.12.60 d Springvale 6.9.45
- 1959 – McKinnon 8.13.61 d Mentone 8.9.57
- 1960 – Springvale 14.9.93 d McKinnon 8.16.64
- 1961 – Springvale 12.8.80 d Glen Huntly 10.11.71
- 1962 – Springvale 14.13.97 d Glen Huntly 7.12.54
- 1963 – Springvale 17.16.118 d Mentone 8.13.61
- 1964 – East Malvern 8.18.66 d Glen Huntly 7.9.51
- 1965 – Springvale 15.13.103 Glen Huntly 3.12.30
- 1966 – East Malvern 13.13.91 d Springvale 11.13.79
- 1967 – Mentone 14.10.94 d Glen Huntly 11.9.75
- 1968 – Mentone 6.17.53 d Oakleigh District 5.13.43
- 1969 – East Malvern 8.10.58 d Oakleigh District 6.20.56
- 1970 – East Malvern 20.12.132 d Springvale 15.21.111
- 1971 – Highett 17.10.112 d Springvale 12.7.79
- 1972 – Noble Park 15.16.106 d Highett 14.9.93
- 1973 – Highett 17.19.121 d Noble Park 16.14.110
- 1974 – Highett 11.15.81 d Cheltenham 11.14.80
- 1975 – Springvale 20.14.134 d Parkdale 16.13.109
- 1976 – Mentone 12.17.89 d Cheltenham 12.11.83
- 1977 – Springvale 18.19.127 d Oakleigh District 17.13.115
- 1978 – Parkdale 22.19.141 d Oakleigh District 15.17.107
- 1979 – Highett 14.12.96 d Clayton 11.13.79
- 1980 – Clayton 17.30.132 d Springvale 13.14.92
- 1981 – Clayton 16.9.105 d Oakleigh District 11.13.79

== Best and Fairest Awards ==
Senior Football / A. Grade Section

Cr. J.W. ALLNUT MEDAL. (Allnut was President of the FFA from 1936 to 1945 & a life member).

Year	Player's Name	Club	Votes	Year	Player's Name	Club	Votes
1927	P Gleeson	Chelsea		1952	C. Mudge	Mentone	
1928	P Gleeson	Chelsea		1953	A. Beckwith	Mentone	
1929	Les Warren &	Chelsea		1954	G March	Camden	22
	W Hughes	Mordialloc		1955	R Goodes	Parkdale	
1930	Les Warren	Chelsea		1956	George Ashman	Mordialloc	
1931	A Perry	Black Rock		1957	Kevin Phillips	Chelsea	
1932	B.Kavanagh	Mordialloc		1958	Kevan Hamilton	McKinnon	
1933	J Ash &	Caulfield		1959	K Roberts	Cheltenham	
	I Corry	Cheltenham		1960	I Gardner	Springvale	
1934	V Hunter	East Burwood		1961	Kevan Hamilton	McKinnon	
1935	E Roff	East Burwood		1962	Kevan Hamilton	McKinnon	
1936	E Martin	East Burwood		1963	Kevan Hamilton	McKinnon	
1937	J Mitchell	Mentone		1964	K Hamilton	McKinnon	
1938	P Witchell	Black Rock	21	1965	G Gotch	Glenhuntly	
1939	K Dunn	Mentone		1966	W Morrison	Highett	
1940	E.McInerny	Moorabbin		1967	J Ward	Black Rock	
1941	Laurie Kelly	Camden		1968	I House	Caulfield	
1942	In recess. WW2			1969	C Hutchins	East Malvern	
1943	In recess. WW2			1970	K Ellis	Glenhuntly	
1944	In recess. WW2			1971	J Calleja	Bentleigh	
1945	R.Hocking	Camden		1972	D. McGrath	Noble Park	
1946	D.Fankhauser	Mordialloc		1973	F.Clifford	Doveton	
1947	C.Mudge &	Mordialloc		1974	G.Skinner	Parkdale	
	Alf Evans	Chelsea		1975	R.Johnston	McKinnon	
1948	C.Coade &	Glen Orme		1976	A.Sierowkoski	Mentone	
	G.Daley &	Heatherton		1977	L.Studham	Noble Park	
	C.Mudge	Mordialloc		1978	T.Quinn	Bentleigh	
1949	R.Fox	Moorabbin		1979	S.Watt	Noble Park	
1950	C.Dawson	Caulfield		1980	M.Plant	Noble Park	
1951	C.Mudge	Mentone		1981	T.Quinn	Moorabbin	

=== Leading Goal Kickers ===
Year	Player	H&A goals	Finals goals	Total Goals
1945	Noel Neal (Cheltenham)	86	0	86
1946	J Fisher (Chelsea)	87	6	93
1947	Reg Rees (Caulfield)	90	0	90
1948	J McDonald (Camden)	100	0	100
1949	0	0	0	0
1950	0	0	0	0
1951	0	0	0	0
1952	0	0	0	0
1953	0	0	0	0
1954	0	0	0	0
1955	0	0	0	0
1956	0	0	0	0
1957	0	0	0	0
1958	0	0	0	0
1959	J.McNamara (Cheltenham)	101	0	101
1960	R Banfield (Mentone)	60	0	60
1961	Norm Baker (Glenhuntly)	0	113	113
1962	Bill Young (Black Rock)	71	5	76
1963	E Higson (Springvale)	63	4	67
1964	T Mountain (Mentone)	72	0	72
1965	0	0	0	0
1966	John Salvado (East Malvern)	0	105	105
1967	Ted Vale (Mentone)	94	6	100
1968	John Salvado (East Malvern)	0	102	102
1969	John Salvado (East Malvern)	91	11	102
1970	W Godfrey (Parkdale)	0	94	94
1971	John Salvado (East Malvern)	0	95	95
1972	Ian Cummings (Clayton)	107	0	107
1973	M Sertori (Mentone)	0	86	86
1974	Ray Carr (Oakleigh Districts)	106	11	117
1975	Ray Carr (Oakleigh Districts)	70	0	70
1976	Ray Carr (Oakleigh Districts)	0	122	122
1977	Ray Carr (Oakleigh Districts)	88	10	98
1978	Ray Carr (Oakleigh Districts)	0	103	103
1979	Ray Carr (Oakleigh Districts)	0	87	87
1980	Ray Carr (Oakleigh Districts)	0	87	87
1981	Ray Carr (Oakleigh Districts)	0	106	106
