= Archie Roberts =

Archie Roberts may refer to:

- Archie Roberts (American football) (born 1942), cardiac surgeon and American football player
- Archie Roberts (Australian footballer, born 1910) (1910–1945), Australian rules footballer
- Archie Roberts (Australian footballer, born 2005), Australian rules footballer
