= Clarrie Lonsdale =

Australian rules footballer (1906–1971)

Personal information
- Full name: Clarence Alexander Lonsdale
- Nickname: Bluey
- Born: 13 September 1906; Berrigan, New South Wales
- Died: 6 December 1971 (aged 65); Moe, Victoria
- Original team: Cheltenham
- Height: 180 cm (5 ft 11 in)
- Weight: 78 kg (172 lb)
- Position: Halfback

Playing career^{1}
Years	Club	Games (Goals)
1927–1937	Hawthorn	109 (22)
- ^{1} Playing statistics correct to the end of 1937.

Clarence Alexander Lonsdale (13 September 1906 – 6 December 1971) was an Australian rules footballer who played with Hawthorn in the Victorian Football League (VFL).

== Early life ==
The seventh of eleven children born to George Lonsdale (1866–1962) and Elizabeth Lonsdale (1868–1951), nee Moncrieff, Clarence Alexander Lonsdale was born in Berrigan, New South Wales, on 13 September 1906.

Lonsdale was schooled in Henty, New South Wales, and moved with his family to Cheltenham in Victoria when he was a teenager.

== Football ==
Lonsdale played for Cheltenham in the Federal Association for four years before getting recruited by Hawthorn. While at Cheltenham he played mainly as a full forward and on one occasion kicked 100 goals in the season. He played in their 1925 premiership.

Moving to Hawthorn in 1927, Lonsdale made his debut in round three against Footscray at the Western Oval. At Hawthorn Lonsdale mainly played on the half back line, his ability to take strong overhead marks was a feature of his game.

Lonsdale hurt his knee against Essendon in 1929 and subsequently returned to Cheltenham. He also played for Cheltenham in 1930 and 1931. He had two games on permit with the Mayblooms in 1931, before returning to Hawthorn in 1932. Lonsdale was the fifth Hawthorn player to play one hundred VFL games.

After playing in the first 3 rounds of 1937, Lonsdale requested and received a clearance to Darling in the Federal League and he helped Darling win a premiership that year.

== War service ==
In October 1942, Clarrie Lonsdale enlisted in the Australian Army and at the time of his discharge in November 1945 was a member of the 14/32 Australian Infantry Battalion.

== Later life ==
Returning to civilian life after World War II, Lonsdale moved to Moe where he worked as a plasterer. Clarrie Lonsdale died in Moe on 6 December 1971.

== Honours and achievements ==
- Hawthorn life member
