= Trevor Barker =

Australian rules footballer (1956–1996)

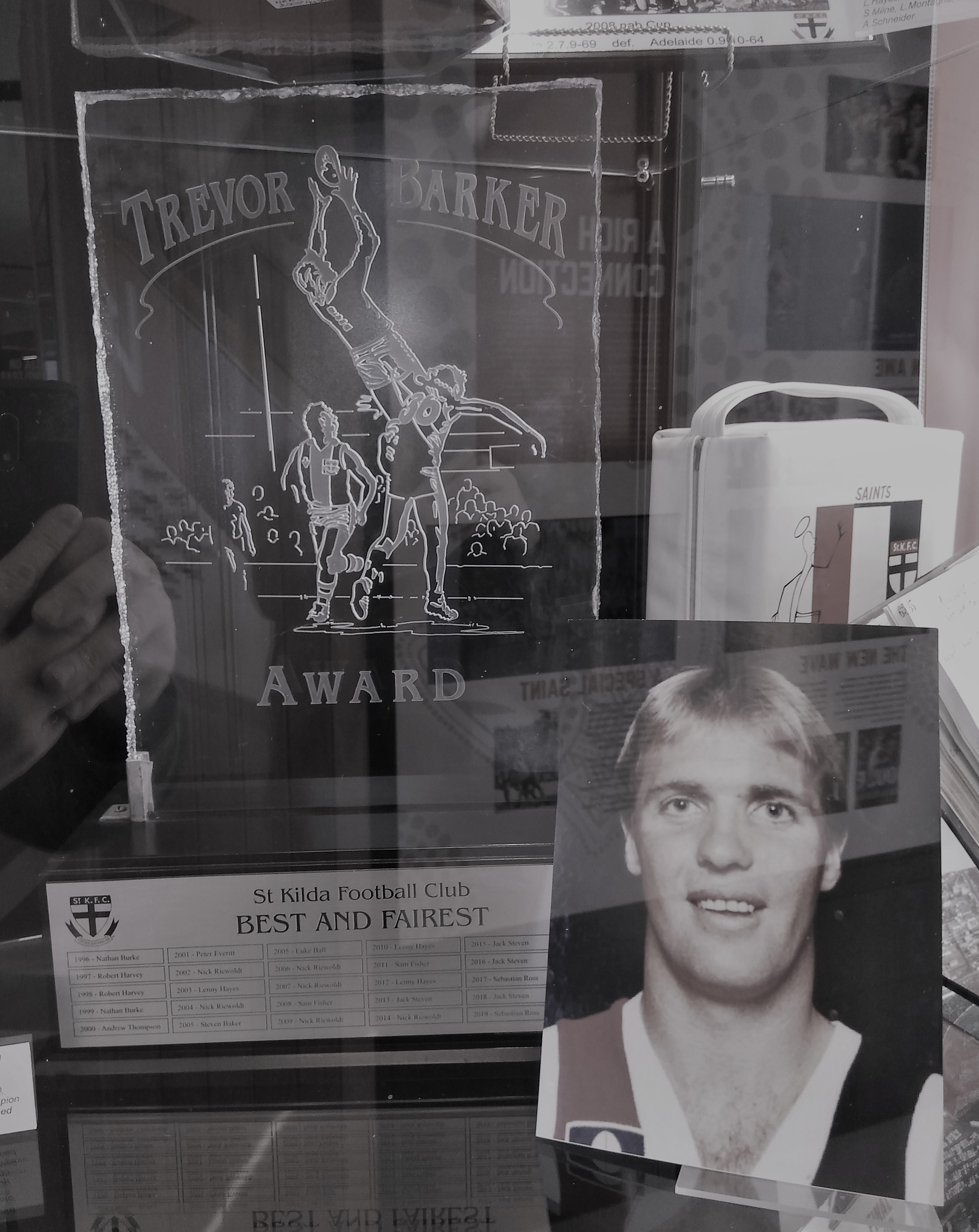

Personal information
- Full name: Trevor Graeme Barker
- Born: 7 October 1956
- Died: 26 April 1996 (aged 39); Hampton, Victoria
- Original team: Cheltenham
- Debut: Round 2, 12 April 1975, St Kilda vs. Hawthorn, at Moorabbin Oval
- Height: 183 cm (6 ft 0 in)
- Weight: 71 kg (157 lb)

Playing career^{1}
Years	Club	Games (Goals)
1975–1989	St Kilda	230 (134)

Representative team honours
Years	Team	Games (Goals)
	Victoria	7 (?)

Coaching career
Years	Club	Games (W–L–D)
1992–1994	Sandringham	58 (44–14–0)
- ^{1} Playing statistics correct to the end of 1989.

Career highlights
- Cheltenham FC Under 16's Best & Fairest 1972; Cheltenham FC Under 18's Best & Fairest 1973 & 1974; St Kilda FC Best & Fairest: 1976 & 1981; St Kilda FC Captain: 1983 to 1986; St Kilda FC Life Member; Sandringham Zebras (VFA) Premiership Coach: 1992 & 1994; St Kilda FC Team of the Century 1900–1999; St Kilda FC Hall of Fame: 2003; St Kilda FC Hall of Fame: Legend Status 2013; Australian Football Hall of Fame: 2019

Trevor Graeme Barker (7 October 1956 – 26 April 1996) was an Australian rules footballer who played for the St Kilda Football Club in the Victorian Football League (VFL).

After his early death from cancer at the age of 39, St Kilda honoured Barker's memory by naming the club's best-and-fairest award in his name. He was posthumously inducted into the Australian Football Hall of Fame in 2019.

== Early life ==
Barker was one of two children born to Jack and Norma Barker. His father was also a footballer, playing over 300 games for the Cheltenham Football Club, winning two club best-and-fairest awards, and once finishing runner-up in the league best and fairest.

In February 1966, Barker's five-year-old sister, Katrina Margaret, died from complications caused by a congenital heart condition. According to Barker's mother, the grief of losing his younger sister remained with him his whole life.

Barker followed in his father's footsteps, playing football for Cheltenham and winning three consecutive club best-and-fairest awards: in 1972 in the Under-16s/17s team, and then in 1973 and 1974 with the Under-18s. Barker grew up barracking for the St Kilda Football Club.

== Career with St Kilda FC ==
=== 1975: Recruitment and debut ===
Barker's boyhood dream was fulfilled when the Saints recruited him for the 1975 VFL season. After playing just one game in the reserves, Barker was selected on the half-forward flank for his senior debut in the Round 2 match against Hawthorn at Moorabbin Oval, wearing the number 25. After an even first quarter, in which St Kilda captain Barry Lawrence kicked four goals, Hawthorn took control and eventually won comfortably by 40 points. Barker had a respectable 15 touches and was named among St Kilda's best players in The Age on the Monday following the game. Barker would play a further 17 games for the season to cement his place in the senior team, averaging 14 disposals a game in his first year.

=== 1976: First Best & Fairest ===
In the 1976 VFL season, which was Allan Jeans' last season as St Kilda coach, Barker was moved to defence. He was often matched on larger opponents, acquitting himself superbly in just his second season. Excited by the challenge, Barker's athleticism, courage and competitiveness throughout the season was obvious. Averaging 12 disposals a game, he relentlessly placed himself in position to challenge his opponents, his courage rewarded with 49 free kicks by the field umpires during the season, conceding just 13 for the year. Barker was recognised for his skill and courage at the end-of-season awards; he won the first of two club Best and Fairest awards and was St Kilda's best representative in the Brownlow Medal count, polling 21 votes to finish equal 13th with Carlton's Rod Ashman and Fitzroy's Kevin O'Keeffe.

=== 1977: Iconic number 1 ===
After his standout season in 1976, Barker changed to the number 1 jumper he would forever become synonymous with at St Kilda FC. Club Champion, Brownlow Medallist, and Premiership Player Ross Smith had served as assistant coach upon returning to St Kilda in 1975, was senior coach for the 1977 VFL season. Barker averaged 14 disposals per game, amassed 70 marks, and 71 free kicks for. He kicked four goals in the Round 17 match against Hawthorn.

=== 1978: Standout season ===
For the 1978 VFL season, Ross Smith was replaced as coach by former Richmond player Mike Patterson. After successful recruiting, the Saints began the season strongly, with Barker being played more in a midfield-forward attacking role. The Saints were in second place after seven rounds on 5 wins and one draw with a fast-paced high-scoring line-up. Barker kicked three goals three times in the first 7 rounds. His ability to play mid-forward punctuated by 29 disposals and 3 goals in the Saints win over Melbourne in Round 6. After a high scoring first quarter which gave the Saints a 17-point lead, the team went on to amass 126 points by half time. The game ending in a 63-point win to St Kilda in a still club record score of 31.18 (204). St Kilda's season faltered mid-season, with six losses in a row followed by a close 3-point win over second placed North Melbourne. Barker collected his first ever 30 disposals or more game against Melbourne in Round 17. The team rebounded to win four of the next five games to sit just outside the top five, separated from fifth-placed Geelong by only two premiership points courtesy of their draw against Richmond in Round 3.

In Round 22, the Saints hosted Carlton at Moorabbin, the standings suggesting St Kilda needed a win and Fitzroy to defeat Geelong to play Finals. The Saints put in one of their finest displays in recent seasons, thoroughly outplaying the Blues in front of a packed Moorabbin crowd to win by 40 points. Barker racked up 28 disposals and 2 goals, and was listed among St Kilda's best afield. St Kilda finished the season an underwhelming 6th. Barker was the Saints leading disposal winner for the season, racking up 493 disposals to go with his 87 marks, 23 goals and 92 free kicks for. It was his most prolific season at St Kilda.

In 1979, Barker was restricted to 15 games through injury, averaging just under 20 disposals per game. His 17 disposal 2 goal effort a standout in the Saints Round 1 win over Hawthorn, in what was a dismal year for the team as a whole. Uncontrollable outside pressures were beginning to mount on St Kilda FC, and they would have a devastating effect in the following years. 1980 saw Barker again restricted through injury, playing 17 games for the season averaging 18.5 disposals per game.

=== 1981: Second Best & Fairest ===
Celebratory Games
Year	Tally
1977	50th Game - Round 14 versus Fitzroy
1980	100th Game - Round 8 versus Geelong
1983	150th Game* - Round 9 versus Sydney Swans (*Life Membership)
1987	200th Game - Round 4 versus Melbourne
1989	Final Game - Round 22 versus Hawthorn

With external financial pressures beginning to mount on St Kilda Football Club in the early 1980s, Barker was again a standout leader at the Saints in 1981. He achieved his highest disposals per game figure for his career, averaging a massive 24.7 disposals per game over 19 games, including six matches where he amassed 30 disposals or more. He was St Kilda Football Club's leading disposal winner for the season with 470, winning his second club Best & Fairest Award. He finished 7th in the Brownlow Medal for the season, clearly St Kilda FC's leading vote-winner. Barker was rumoured to have won a vehicle for being awarded the Best & Fairest in 1981, which he promptly raffled off to raise money for the club to stay in the league and continue to field a team each week.

In 1982, Barker was restricted to 14 games through injury, with his off-field leadership becoming more important to St Kilda FC as severe financial hardship began to have its effect on the organisation as a whole. The Saints were having difficulties meeting financial requirements and commitments required to merely field a team in the competition.

=== 1983 to 1986: Captain of St Kilda FC ===
Barker was appointed Captain of the St Kilda Football Club prior to the start of the 1983 Premiership Season. His commitment to the club was more than that of a full-time player. He was regularly involved in organised and sometimes impromptu fund raising for the team to keep its playing list on the field for matches during his captaincy. Repeatedly replying to queries on whether St Kilda FC would have any kind of future at all with reiterating that the club was too important to let disappear. He worked diligently off the field to help continue St Kilda FC appearing on the field in the most traumatic and stressful time in the clubs history. On-field results began to become an almost secondary issue to off-filed financial restraints, which permeated through all aspects of St Kilda FC through the mid-1980s. Barker continually reiterated the importance of the club as a whole, working off-field to find solutions to financial issues that were seen as insurmountable to some.

Barker played 16 and 14 games respectively in 1983 and 1984, just four in 1985, and 18 in 1986, where he averaged 16.2 disposals per game. He also worked off-field to attempt to settle St Kilda FC's debts with its creditors, to allow the Saints to continue to operate as a business in the League as a whole, and fend off administration or liquidation. The then VFL administration began to discuss plans to further expand the competition, with a view to attempting to make it a national Australian League. The league stated it was in too difficult financial condition to offer St Kilda FC any large short-term financial assistance, and would need to add interstate teams and charge them a multi-million dollar license fee to enter the competition to alleviate overall debt and generate more revenue.

During this period of mooted expansion, with some public plans for new teams interstate revealed, Barker worked to attempt to help negotiate St Kilda FC out of its debts, to try to get a fresh financial start for the club. St Kilda FC's administration and Captain found creditors to be approachable and willing to negotiate. In the end, some creditors took as little as 10 cents in the dollar in exchange for agreeing to write off St Kilda FC's debts to them, so the Saints could continue in the competition. Current and former players of the time who were owed money for their unpaid playing contracts agreed to a final settlement of 10 cents in the dollar, which was brokered in part by Barker himself. The clubs debt were almost totally wiped out by agreements with happy to help creditors, who were initially unaware of the extent of the financial woes. By the time the league administration announced the entry of the West Coast Eagles and Brisbane Bears into the competition for the start of the 1987 Premiership Season, for a license fee of 6 million dollars each, St Kilda FC was almost totally debt free thanks to the generosity of its creditors. Barker stood down from the Captaincy at the end of the 1986 Premiership Season.

=== 1987: Expanded competition and new beginning ===
St Kilda FC appointed Darrel Baldock as its new coach for the start of the 1987 season, with Barker remaining on the playing list. St Kilda was attempting a fresh start with massively reduced debts compared to the previous decade, no player or coaching staff wages owing, and looking forward to competing in an expanded competition that was undergoing restructuring which resulted in a permanent national draft and salary cap. The league administration had also been changed over to a "Commission" style committee intending to operate independently of the clubs themselves. St Kilda had recruited well, including future club legends like Tony Lockett and Nicky Winmar.

Barker was restricted to 14 games during St Kilda FC's top 5 competitive 1987 VFL season, which finished at an underwhelming 10th place on the official standings. St Kilda won 5 consecutive games in Rounds 15 to 19, the last with a caretaker Coach as Darrell Baldock had been admitted to hospital with the diagnosis being a stroke.

=== Retirement ===
Barker played seven games in 1988 and 12 games in 1989. He retired at the end of the 1989 VFL Season after 230 games as a life member of St Kilda Football Club. Playing his whole career during an unsuccessful period for the club, Barker never played a finals match; as of 2025, he holds the VFL/AFL record among all players for the most career games without playing in a final.

== Coaching ==
Barker worked in the media for two years following his retirement in 1989 before embarking on what would be a short-lived coaching career with the Sandringham Football Club, where he became close to many of the players. In three seasons, he led the Zebras to two VFA premierships in 1992 and 1994, winning 44 out of his 58 games as coach. In 1995, he returned to the Saints as an assistant coach to Stan Alves, taking charge of the reserves team and mentoring many young St Kilda FC players who went on to play in the 1996 Ansett Australia Cup premiership. Poor health restricted his time at St Kilda FC headquarters during 1995 and 1996.

== Statistics ==
Legend
G	Goals	K	Kicks	D	Disposals	T	Tackles
B	Behinds	H	Handballs	M	Marks

Season	Team	No.	Games	Totals							Averages (per game)						
Season	Team	No.	Games	G	B	K	H	D	M	T	G	B	K	H	D	M	T
1975	St Kilda	25	18	10	21	186	56	242	29	—N/a	0.6	1.2	10.9	3.3	14.2	1.7	—N/a
1976	St Kilda	25	19	0	2	205	26	231	43	—N/a	0.0	0.1	10.8	1.4	12.2	2.3	—N/a
1977	St Kilda	1	21	6	2	273	24	297	70	—N/a	0.3	0.1	13.0	1.1	14.1	3.3	—N/a
1978	St Kilda	1	22	23	24	431	62	493	87	—N/a	1.0	1.2	19.6	2.8	22.4	4.0	—N/a
1979	St Kilda	1	15	9	21	245	49	294	59	—N/a	0.6	1.4	16.3	3.3	19.6	3.9	—N/a
1980	St Kilda	1	17	12	7	255	59	314	55	—N/a	0.7	0.4	15.0	3.5	18.5	3.2	—N/a
1981	St Kilda	1	19	6	7	330	140	470	77	—N/a	0.3	0.4	17.4	7.4	24.7	4.1	—N/a
1982	St Kilda	1	14	16	5	173	77	250	39	—N/a	1.1	0.4	12.4	5.5	17.9	2.8	—N/a
1983	St Kilda	1	16	10	4	185	86	271	53	—N/a	0.6	0.3	11.6	5.4	16.9	3.3	—N/a
1984	St Kilda	1	14	12	7	131	76	207	34	—N/a	0.9	0.5	9.4	5.4	14.8	2.4	—N/a
1985	St Kilda	1	4	0	1	31	12	43	11	—N/a	0.0	0.3	7.8	3.0	10.8	2.8	—N/a
1986	St Kilda	1	18	16	10	209	83	292	69	—N/a	0.9	0.6	11.6	4.6	16.2	3.8	—N/a
1987	St Kilda	1	14	4	3	142	78	220	45	29	0.3	0.2	10.1	5.6	15.7	3.2	2.1
1988	St Kilda	1	7	2	3	74	37	111	19	13	0.3	0.4	10.6	5.3	15.9	2.7	1.9
1989	St Kilda	1	12	8	8	82	31	113	26	13	0.7	0.7	6.8	2.6	9.4	2.2	1.1
Career			230	134	125	2952	896	3848	716	55	0.6	0.6	12.9	3.9	16.8	3.1	1.7

== Death ==
Barker had to put his coaching career on hold midway through the 1995 season for health reasons. He died at the Linacre Private Hospital in Hampton on 26 April 1996 of liver failure after a prolonged battle with colon cancer. He was 39 years of age.

Barker's funeral at the Moorabbin Town Hall was attended by 6,000 mourners, and he was later buried at the Cheltenham Memorial Cemetery, alongside his sister.

== Legacy ==
His contribution to St Kilda, particularly in the 1980s when the club had severe financial difficulties, was significant. St Kilda's best-and-fairest award, instituted in 1914, is named the Trevor Barker Award as a mark of respect to his contribution to the St Kilda Football Club. Barker was named in the club's Team of the Century 1900–1999.

Barker was inducted to the St Kilda Football Club Hall of Fame in 2003; he was upgraded to Legend status in 2013.

The home ground of the Sandringham Football Club was also named Trevor Barker Beach Oval in his honour.

On 4 June 2019, Barker was inducted into the Australian Football Hall of Fame in a ceremony held at the Crown Palladium. St Kilda champion and teammate Robert Harvey gave the introduction speech in honour of Barker:

"Never have I played with a guy who radiated passion and loyalty for his club like (Barker). He was renowned for his high marking, his blonde locks and often his lifestyle off the field. He was a true St Kilda champion."

After a video tribute, Barker's mother Norma accepted the certificate from AFL Commission chairman Richard Goyder. Tributes flowed from teammates and fans. Western Bulldogs coach Luke Beveridge, who played under Barker for St Kilda's reserve team, had nothing but praise for his boyhood idol:

"Looking at him on the ground it was almost like seeing a polar bear in the Sahara, or a lion in the Arctic – he just stood out. He was a good-looking man and he was only medium-sized but he had amazing courage and he could virtually play anywhere. He was a brilliant and hard tackler ... but then you had the other extreme, which is the frilly bits in a game like the high marks, unbelievable skills — he was so clean. He just had everything and when you combine the ability to run and the courage that he had, he was the complete player. One of the most rounded, respected, hardest, talented, devoted, loyal players in the game.”
