= Ernest Bean =

Australian cricketer

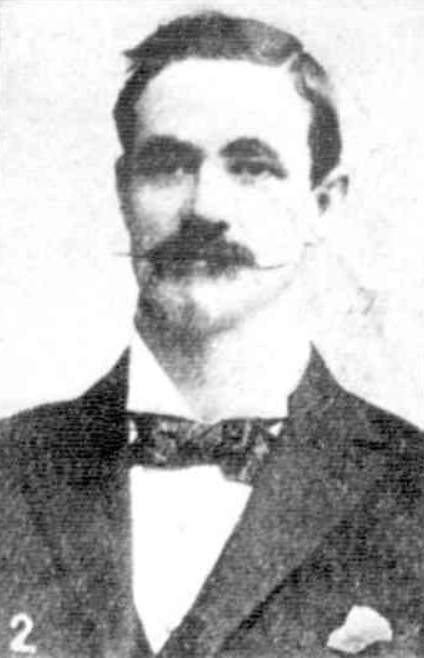

Personal information
- Born: 17 April 1866; Ballarat, Australia
- Died: 22 March 1939 (aged 72); Hampton, Victoria, Australia

Domestic team information
- Years: Team
- 1888-1906: Victoria
- Source: Cricinfo, 25 July 2015

Ernest Bean (17 April 1866 – 22 March 1939) was an Australian cricketer. He played eight first-class cricket matches for Victoria between 1888 and 1906. He was also a patron of the Victorian Cricket Association.

== See also ==
- List of Victoria first-class cricketers
