= Paddy Cross =

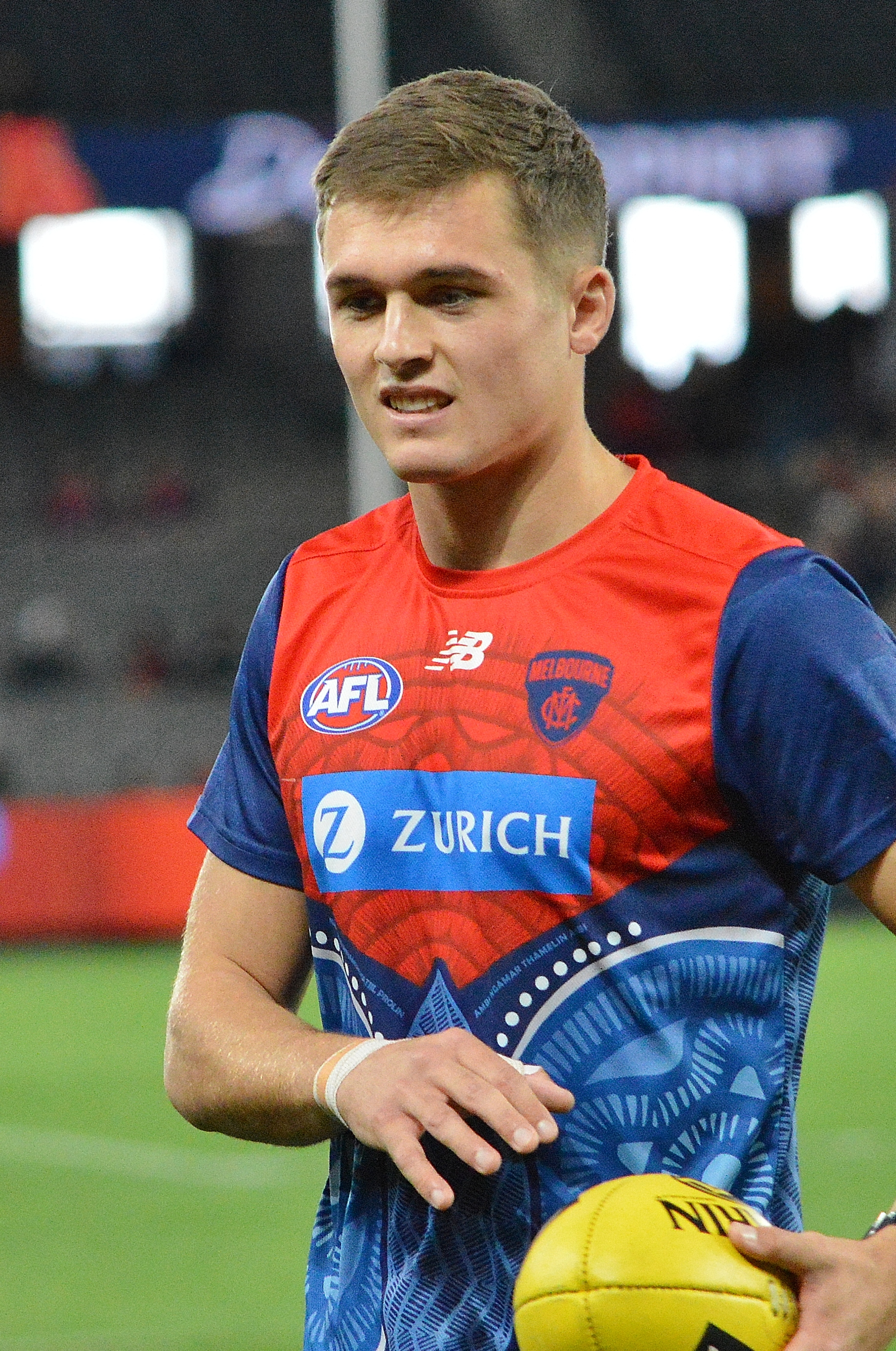
- Cross in May 2026

Personal information
- Born: 14 February 2003 (age 23)
- Original teams: Beaconsfield Football Club (OEFNL); Gippsland Power (Talent League); Nar Nar Goon Football Club (WGFNC); North Melbourne (VFL); Casey Demons (VFL)
- Draft: 2026 pre-season supplemental selection period
- Debut: Round 3, 2026, Melbourne vs. Carlton, at the MCG
- Height: 183 cm (6 ft 0 in)
- Position: Forward

Club information
- Current club: Melbourne
- Number: 41

Playing career^{1}
| Years | Club | Games (Goals) |
| 2026– | Melbourne | 11 (6) |
- ^{1} Playing statistics correct to the end of round 22, 2026.

Patrick Cross (born 14 February 2003) is a professional Australian rules footballer playing for the Melbourne Football Club in the Australian Football League (AFL).

== Pre-AFL career ==
Cross played junior football for the Beaconsfield Football Club. He represented the Gippsland Power in the Talent League. Cross also played for the Nar Nar Goon Football Club in the West Gippsland Football Netball Competition.

In 2022, Cross played one game in the VFL for North Melbourne, before joining the Casey Demons in 2023.

== AFL career ==
Cross joined the Melbourne Football Club during the 2026 pre-season supplemental selection period. He made his debut in round 3 of the 2026 AFL season.

== Personal life ==
Cross's grandfather, Ray Cross, played 57 games for the St Kilda Football Club.

== Statistics ==
Updated to the end of round 22, 2026.

Legend
| G | Goals | K | Kicks | D | Disposals | T | Tackles |
| B | Behinds | H | Handballs | M | Marks |

| Season | Team | No. | Games | Totals | | | | | | | Averages (per game) | | | | | | | Votes |
| Season | Team | No. | Games | G | B | K | H | D | M | T | G | B | K | H | D | M | T | Votes |
|---|---|---|---|---|---|---|---|---|---|---|---|---|---|---|---|---|---|---|
| 2026 | Melbourne | 41 | 11 | 6 | 4 | 51 | 36 | 87 | 23 | 31 | 0.5 | 0.4 | 4.6 | 3.3 | 7.9 | 2.1 | 2.8 | 0 |
| Career | | | 11 | 6 | 4 | 51 | 36 | 87 | 23 | 31 | 0.5 | 0.4 | 4.6 | 3.3 | 7.9 | 2.1 | 2.8 | 0 |
