= Hampton East =

Hampton East Melbourne, Victoria
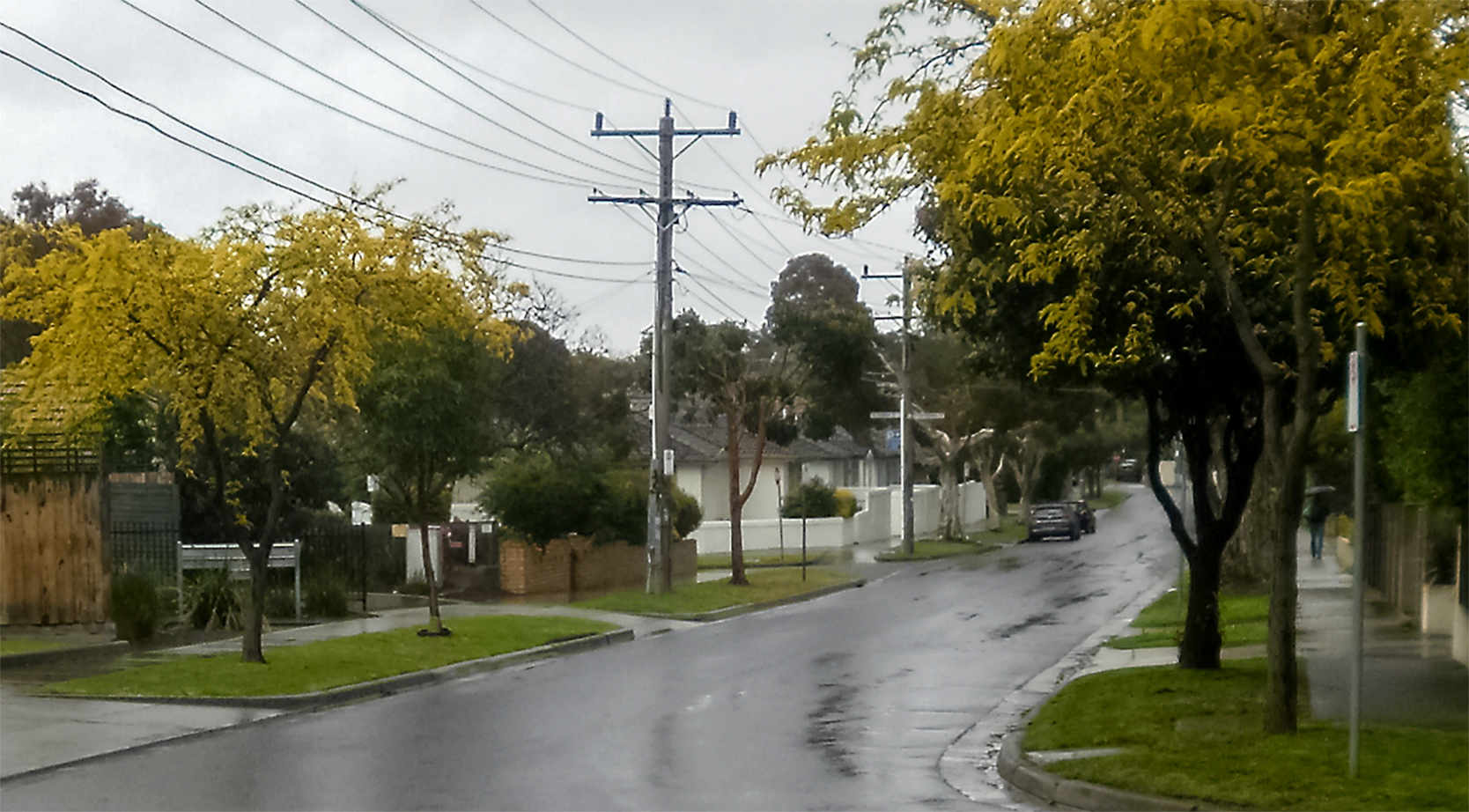
- Keiller Street, Hampton East

- Coordinates: 37.939°S 145.031°E
- Population: 5,069 (2021 census)
  - Density: 3,620/km^{2} (9,400/sq mi)
- Postcode(s): 3188
- Elevation: 32 m (105 ft)
- Area: 1.4 km^{2} (0.5 sq mi)
- Location: 14 km (9 mi) from Melbourne
- LGA(s): City of Bayside
- State electorate(s): Bentleigh; Sandringham
- Federal division(s): Goldstein
Suburbs around Hampton East:
Brighton East	Brighton East	Bentleigh
Hampton	Hampton East	Moorabbin
Hampton	Highett	Highett

Hampton East is a suburb in Melbourne, Victoria, Australia, 14 km south-east of Melbourne's Central Business District, located within the City of Bayside local government area. Hampton East recorded a population of 5,069 at the 2021 census.

== History ==
Hampton East is a residential suburb mainly developed during the 1950s. The Post Office opened on 1 September 1947, closed in 1950 and reopened in 1956.

== See also ==
- City of Moorabbin – Hampton East was previously within this former local government area.

== Notable people ==
- JS - Professional GR Player
