= Steve Leehane =

Australian rules footballer

Personal information
- Full name: John Stephen Leehane
- Born: 20 October 1891; Horsham, Victoria
- Died: 4 April 1972 (aged 80); Parkville, Victoria
- Original team: Cheltenham
- Height: 179 cm (5 ft 10 in)
- Weight: 73 kg (161 lb)
- Position: Defender

Playing career^{1}
| Years | Club | Games (Goals) |
| 1914–1919 | Carlton | 82 (14) |
- ^{1} Playing statistics correct to the end of 1919.

John Stephen "Steve" Leehane (20 October 1891 – 4 April 1972) was an Australian rules footballer who played with Carlton in the Victorian Football League (VFL).

A defender, Leehane was recruited from Cheltenham and played finals football in five of his six league seasons. He missed the 1915 finals series with a groin injury and missed out on playing in back to back premierships, having been a half back flanker in Carlton's 1914 premiership team. Leehane was a full-back in the 1916 VFL Grand Final, which Carlton lost to Fitzroy.

He had two sons, Ted and Tom, who also had VFL careers.
