= Ron Porta =

Australian rules footballer

Personal information
- Full name: Ronald Charles Porta
- Born: 3 June 1936
- Died: 19 March 2010 (aged 73)
- Original team: Cheltenham
- Height: 185 cm (6 ft 1 in)
- Weight: 83 kg (183 lb)
- Position: Half-back

Playing career^{1}
| Years | Club | Games (Goals) |
| 1953–59 | Footscray | 63 (2) |
| 1960–61 | South Melbourne | 21 (0) |
| Total | | 84 (2) |
- ^{1} Playing statistics correct to the end of 1961.

Ronald Charles Porta (3 June 1936 – 19 March 2010) was an Australian rules footballer who played with Footscray and South Melbourne in the Victorian Football League (VFL).

He coached Victorian Football Association club Mordialloc from 1962 to 1964.
