= Kevan Hamilton =

Australian rules footballer

Personal information
- Nickname: Icy
- Born: 1 February 1934
- Died: 30 July 2017 (aged 83)
- Original team: McKinnon
- Debut: Round 3, 1956, Carlton vs. St Kilda, at Junction Oval
- Height: 180 cm (5 ft 11 in)
- Weight: 80 kg (176 lb)

Playing career^{1}
Years	Club	Games (Goals)
1956	Carlton	11 (22)
- ^{1} Playing statistics correct to the end of 1956.

Kevan Hamilton (1 February 1934 – 30 July 2017) was an Australian rules footballer who played for the Carlton Football Club in the Victorian Football League (VFL).

Hamilton made his debut for Carlton in round 6 of the 1956 season and spent 1957 playing in the Reserves.

Hamilton returned to McKinnon Football Club in 1958 and proceeded to win the Federal Football League's best and fairest award, the J. W. Allnut Medal in 1958, 1961, 1962, 1963 and 1964.
