= Highett Football Club =

Highett

Names
- Full name: Highett Football Netball Club
- Nickname: Bulldogs

Club details
- Founded: 1929; 97 years ago
- Colours
- Competition: Southern Football Netball League
- President: Mick Aldridge
- Coach: Anthony Quon
- Ground: Turner Road Reserve, Highett

Uniforms
Home

Other information
- Official website: highettfnc.com.au

The Highett Football Club is a semi-professional Australian rules football club in the southern suburbs of Melbourne. The club participates in the Southern Football Netball League.

== History ==
In 1929 Highett joined the Federal Football League, where it played in the junior section. In 1934 it entered a side in second division. For three years (1936-1938), the Bulldogs were runner-up, then in 1939 it finally won the Premiership, its one and only.

The run of success ended in 1945 when it became a senior section club. From then on the record was not good - 405 games with 102 wins, 299 losses, 4 ties and the wooden spoon on 5 occasions.

Approaching the 1970s the club improved and in 1970 it made the finals for the first time. In 1971, the club finally won the Premiership, the club's first senior flag. Season 1972 resulted in another Grand Final berth only to be beaten by Noble Park. The 1973 season proved to be the most outstanding year the club experienced, fielding senior, reserve, under 18 and under 16 teams in the Federal League and three teams in the Chelsea Junior League (under 10's, 12's and under 14's), with 5 out of 7 entering the finals, resulting in a senior and reserve premiership and the under 14's finishing runners up. The 1974 season again proved to be a remarkable achievement winning a second flag in a row. The club picked up one more premiership in the Federal league in 1979.

1980 saw increasing costs and a lack of success there was a big possibility the club would have to disband, however despite their bad financial situation, the community rallied to keep the club going. The club transferred to the South East Suburban Football League after the Federal Football League dissolved in 1981.

The club continued to struggle - as did the neighbouring Highett West Football Club (the Kookaburras). After many weeks of negotiations the clubs amalgamated in 1989 and became known as the Highett District Bulldogs, wearing the Highett West colour of the blue and white hoops.

The new Highett Districts Football Club began in the first division of the South East Suburban Football League where Highett West had been at the time. An exodus of key players meant the merged club again began to struggle on the field. By 1995, the club had tumbled into the third division.

In 1997, once again facing extinction due to mounting financial difficulties and promotion back to Division 2 after winning the Division 3 premiership in 1996, the Highett Districts Football Club, again became the Highett Football Club and changed its jumpers to an original red, white and blue jumper with a Bulldog image on the front. A drop back to Division 3 upon a league re-structure in 1998, but a double promotion had the club back in Division 2 in 2000. The successful restructure of the club resulted in the Bulldogs clawing its way back into first division after its Division 2 premiership in 2004.

Brad Berry was appointed coach for the 2020 season. The club was relegated at the conclusion of 2021 to Division 2. Berry and Highett parted ways in August, 2022.

== Junior Club ==
The Highett Junior Football Club was established in 2001 after the Moorabbin United Junior Football Club (known as the Bears) decided to align themselves with a senior club in order to provide a developmental continuity for their young players to progress through to the open-age ranks. The junior club fields seven under age teams (from under 9s to under 17s) each weekend in Moorabbin Saints Junior Football League.

== Senior Premierships ==
- Federal Football League (4): 1971, 1973, 1974, 1979
- South East Suburban Football League (1): 1986 Champions and Premiers
- Southern Football Netball League
  - 3rd Division (1): 1996
  - 2nd Division (3): 2004, 2011, 2018
