= Clayton Football Club =

Australian rules football club

Clayton FNC

Names
- Full name: Clayton Football & Netball Club
- Nickname(s): The Clays, Clays, The Claydies (Women's Football team)

Club details
- Founded: 1908; 118 years ago
- Colours
- Competition: Southern Football Netball League
- Premierships: (11): 1934, 1950, 1980, 1981, 1982, 1984, 1993, 2001, 2006, 2010, 2018 (Women's)
- Ground: Meade / Clayton Reserve, Clayton

Uniforms
Home

Other information
- Official website: Clayton Football & Netball Club

The Clayton Football & Netball Club (CFNC) is an Australian rules football club located in the Melbourne bayside suburb of Clayton. They compete in the 3rd Division of the Southern Football Netball League in the Men's football competition, the 2nd Division of the Women's competition and field two Women's Netball teams in the SFNL Netball competition.

== History ==
Founded in 1908 by William Bunny, a local Councillor at the time, the club first played in The Berwick Football Association and its successor the Dandenong District Football Association.

When the Dandenong competition folded and reformed as the South West Gippsland FL in 1954, Clayton opted to join the Federal Football League. They broke through and won the last two premierships, in 1980 and 1981.

Clayton then commenced in the South East Suburban Football League in 1982, winning the premiership. They followed up a few years later by winning the 1984 premiership. Unhappy with the quality of administration in the SESFL, the club applied and were cleared to the Eastern District Football League (EDFL). They spent three years at the top of the 2nd Division ladder before competing in the 1992 Grand Final and breaking through to win the 1993 premiership. That allowed the club to be promoted to the 1st Division. After five years in the top division of the EDFL the club opted to return to their natural local competition in 1999.

The Club has many life members and stalwarts over its vast history, most notably the Meade family. The ground is named after Jack Meade who served the club for over 45 years (1950 - c.1995).

Clayton won the 2001 and 2006 1st Division premierships, a regular finalist for most years, but by 2008 Clayton began to struggle with the quality of the competition, and finished last in their division that year. As a result the club was relegated back to 2nd Division. They bounced back the following year in 2010, winning the premiership and promotion back into 1st Division. After competing in 1st Division since 2010, Clayton went through a winless season in 2017 which had them competing in 2nd Division in 2018. Another winless season from the Men's Senior side in 2018, will see Clayton competing in Men's Football Division 3 in season 2019.

In 2018, Clayton fielded its inaugural Women's football team, nicknamed "The Claydies", who went on to win the SFNL Women's Division 2 Premeriship. In the team's maiden year, Captain Stephanie Sandoval will go down in SFNL history as the inaugural winner of the Women's Division 2 Best & Fairest medal. Sandoval accumulated a total of 22 votes to finish four votes clear of second placed Stephanie Rummel of Frankston. Sandoval also won the SFNL Women's Division 2 Superboot award, having kicked 21 goals for the season.

== Nostalgia ==
An unusual occurrence to the Clayton Football Club took place on 9 May 1914, the club with their new red jerseys and red stockings were leading at three-quarter time against Clyde. An enraged bull attacked the crowd and the players. Though bulls are colorblind, a commonly held misconception attributed the bull's charge to the red jerseys of the Clayton players, who wisely took shelter in the club's dressing rooms. The bull charged at the door of the dressing room and the whole building trembled. The door withstood the first charge, but the bull's second attempt smashed the door in. Only the narrow doorway stopped the bull from getting access to the rooms and the horrified victims.

The people inside the rooms kept up a barrage of boots, coats and everything possible to scare it away. A local farmer came; and, knowing how to handle bulls, was able to control it, and led the animal away to a more secure paddock.

== Senior Premierships ==
- Dandenong District Football Association (DDFA)
  - 1934, 1950
- Federal Football League (FFL)
  - 1980, 1981
- South East Suburban Football League (SESFL)
  - 1982, 1984
- Eastern Districts Football League (EDFL)
  - 1993 (Division 2)
- Southern Football Netball League
  - 2001 (Division 1), 2006 (Division 1), 2010 (Division 2), 2018 (Women's Division 2)
