= Archie Roberts (Australian footballer, born 1910) =

Australian rules footballer (1910–1945)

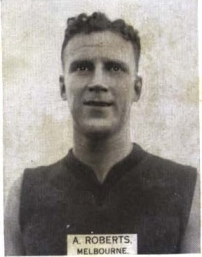

Personal information
- Full name: Archibald Frederick Roberts
- Born: 16 July 1910; Burnley, Victoria
- Died: 6 June 1945 (aged 34); Ambon, Dutch East Indies
- Original team: Cheltenham
- Height: 183 cm (6 ft 0 in)
- Weight: 84 kg (185 lb)
- Position: Defence

Playing career^{1}
Years	Club	Games (Goals)
1932–1936	Melbourne	36 (0)
1937	Essendon	12 (0)
Total		48 (0)
- ^{1} Playing statistics correct to the end of 1937.

Archibald Frederick Roberts (16 July 1910 – 6 June 1945) was an Australian rules footballer who played for the Melbourne Football Club and Essendon Football Club in the Victorian Football League (VFL). Roberts also played with Victorian Football Association (VFA) club Prahran after his VFL career ended.

He took part in the Battle of Ambon during World War II in January 1942. He was captured, and eventually died of illness, still a prisoner of war of the Japanese, on 6 June 1945.

== Family ==
The son of Archibald William Roberts (1887–1943), and Lily Emily Mary Roberts (1887–1971), née Davis, Archibald Frederick Roberts was born at Burnley on 16 July 1910.

== Footballer ==
=== Melbourne ===
Recruited by Melbourne from Cheltenham, he played several matches for the Second XVIII before he played his first senior VFL match for Melbourne, aged 21, against St Kilda, at the MCG on 2 July 1932 (round nine); Lou Riley and Alan Ryan also played their first senior matches on that day. Having lost its first eight matches, this was Melbourne's first win for the 1932 season, winning by 11 points, 12.13 (85) to 10.14 (74).

He also played in the remaining nine matches of the season. He was selected for only two senior games the following year (1933). In 1934, he played in fifteen of Melbourne's eighteen games; however, in 1935 and 1936, he could only manage five and four senior games respectively. His last game for Melbourne was in Melbourne's 50-point victory over Hawthorn on 15 August 1936, 17.10 (112) to 9.8 (62).

In Memoriam
Roll of Honour—On Active Service

ROBERTS.— In loving memory of my dear pal, Arch
Roberts, who died on Ambon Island whilst P.O.W. on
June 6, 1945.
Three little words not hard to write.
But three I'll remember all my life.
My pal, Archie.
(Inserted by Ted Rippon. Glenelg Hotel, Casterton.)
The Argus, 6 June 1946.

=== Essendon ===
Having played a total of 36 senior games for Melbourne, he was given a clearance to Essendon on 21 April 1937. He played at full-back for Essendon, against Footscray, at the Western Oval, on Saturday, 24 April 1937 (round one). Essendon lost by four points in the last minutes of an uninspiring match. In 1937 he played in twelve of a possible eighteen senior matches, playing his last match, in round seventeen, at full-back against Fitzroy, at Windy Hill, on 21 August 1937.

=== Prahran ===
On 1 June 1938, Roberts was granted a clearance from Essendon to the Victorian Football Association club Prahran (the competition's 1937 premiership team), and he played his first senior VFA match, at full-back, for Prahran against Coburg on Saturday, 4 June 1938 (round nine). Most likely due to lack of match practice, he did not play all that well. He played quite a number of the remaining matches of the season, including Prahran's losing semi-final match against Northcote on 30 July 1938. He played at centre half-back, in his last match for Prahran, its 1939 preliminary final loss to Williamstown on 30 September 1939.

== Military service and death ==
Having (pre-war) served for less than three months with the RAAF, he enlisted in the Second AIF on 11 July 1940, and Private Archibald Frederick Roberts (VX44381) was assigned to the 2/21 Australian Infantry Battalion. He was trained at Bonegila, and then his group moved through to Alice Springs, and then Darwin, and then, eventually they marched into the barracks at Tan Tui, just north of Ambon town, the main port of Ambon Island, on 16 December 1941, nine days after the Japanese had entered the war.

As part of the Australian Army's "Gull Force" he took part in the Battle of Ambon during World War II.

He was captured by the Japanese in January 1942. He was taken prisoner by the Japanese, and was treated brutally (as were all of his comrades). He died of illness, due to maltreatment and malnourishment, still a prisoner of war, on 6 June 1945.

== See also ==
- List of Victorian Football League players who died on active service

== Sources ==
- Main, J. & Allen, D., "Roberts, Arch", pp. 327–328 in Main, J. & Allen, D., Fallen – The Ultimate Heroes: Footballers Who Never Returned From War, Crown Content, (Melbourne), 2002.
- Holmesby, Russell & Main, Jim (2007). The Encyclopedia of AFL Footballers. 7th ed. Melbourne: Bas Publishing.
- Deaths: On Active Service: Roberts, The Argus, (Wednesday, 19 September 1945), p. 13.
- Australian War Memorial Roll of Honour – Archibald Frederick Roberts (VX44381)
- Australian War Memorial, Alphabetical list of Prisoners of War – No.795 A F Roberts (VX44381).
- World War II Nominal Roll: Private Archibald Frederick Roberts (VX44381), Department of Veterans' Affairs.
- B883, VX44381: World War Two Service Record: Private Archibald Frederick Roberts (VX44381), National Archives of Australia.
