= George Tanner (Australian footballer) =

Australian rules footballer, born 1914

Personal information
- Full name: George Edward Tanner
- Born: 9 August 1914; Balwyn, Victoria
- Died: 16 February 1982 (aged 67); Fitzroy, Victoria
- Original team: Port Melbourne
- Height: 183 cm (6 ft 0 in)
- Weight: 85 kg (187 lb)

Playing career^{1}
Years	Club	Games (Goals)
1940–41	Port Melbourne (VFA)	26 (0)
1942	St Kilda	2 (0)
1945	Port Melbourne (VFA)	4 (0)
- ^{1} Playing statistics correct to the end of 1945.

George Edward Tanner (9 August 1914 – 16 February 1982) was an Australian rules footballer who played with St Kilda in the Victorian Football League (VFL).
