= Clem Neeson =

Australian rules footballer

Personal information
- Full name: Clem Neeson
- Born: 4 September 1913
- Died: 22 October 1976 (aged 63)
- Original team: Cheltenham
- Height: 182 cm (6 ft 0 in)
- Weight: 78 kg (172 lb)

Playing career^{1}
Years	Club	Games (Goals)
1936–1937	Carlton	10 (2)
1937	St Kilda	3 (0)
Total		13 (2)
- ^{1} Playing statistics correct to the end of 1937.

Clem Neeson (4 September 1913 – 22 October 1976) was an Australian rules footballer who played with Carlton and St Kilda in the Victorian Football League (VFL).
