= Joe Chandler (footballer) =

Australian rules footballer

Personal information
- Full name: Joseph Drummond Chandler
- Born: 18 September 1877; North Melbourne, Victoria
- Died: 18 October 1966 (aged 89); South Yarra, Victoria
- Original team: Cheltenham

Playing career^{1}
Years	Club	Games (Goals)
1898	South Melbourne	3 (2)
- ^{1} Playing statistics correct to the end of 1898.

Joseph Drummond Chandler (18 September 1877 – 18 October 1966) was an Australian rules footballer who played with South Melbourne in the Victorian Football League (VFL).
