= Vaughan Ellis =

Australian rules footballer

Personal information
- Full name: Vaughan Ellis
- Born: 3 August 1947 (age 79)
- Original team: Cheltenham
- Height: 191 cm (6 ft 3 in)
- Weight: 89 kg (196 lb)

Playing career^{1}
Years	Club	Games (Goals)
1965–69	Collingwood	19 (3)
- ^{1} Playing statistics correct to the end of 1969.

Vaughan Ellis is a former Australian rules footballer who played with Collingwood in the Victorian Football League (VFL).
