= Francis Biehl =

Australian rules footballer (1890–1964)

Personal information
- Full name: Francis Henry Biehl
- Born: 23 May 1890; Clifton Hill, Victoria
- Died: 19 July 1964 (aged 74); Cheltenham, Victoria
- Original team: Cheltenham

Playing career^{1}
Years	Club	Games (Goals)
1910	South Melbourne	3 (1)
- ^{1} Playing statistics correct to the end of 1910.

Francis Henry Biehl (23 May 1890 – 19 July 1964) was an Australian rules footballer who played with South Melbourne in the Victorian Football League (VFL).
