= Brian Leary =

Australian rules footballer (born 1930)

Personal information
- Full name: Brian Arthur Leary
- Born: 24 May 1930
- Died: 28 June 2015 (aged 85); Melville, Western Australia
- Original team: Cheltenham
- Height: 175 cm (5 ft 9 in)
- Weight: 76 kg (168 lb)

Playing career^{1}
Years	Club	Games (Goals)
1950	Hawthorn	2 (0)
- ^{1} Playing statistics correct to the end of 1950.

Brian Arthur Leary (24 May 1930 – 28 June 2015) was an Australian rules footballer who played with Hawthorn in the Victorian Football League (VFL). He played his first game in 1950 at the age of 20 years and 17 days, and his second and last game at 20 years and 24 days.
