= Arthur Rose (footballer) =

Australian rules footballer, born 1919

Personal information
- Full name: Arthur Middleton Rose
- Born: 10 July 1919; Cheltenham, Victoria
- Died: 28 April 2000 (aged 80)
- Original team: Cheltenham
- Height: 178 cm (5 ft 10 in)
- Weight: 73 kg (161 lb)

Playing career^{1}
Years	Club	Games (Goals)
1937–1940, 1944	St Kilda	28 (2)
1946–1948	Brighton (VFA)	45 (2)
- ^{1} Playing statistics correct to the end of 1948.

Career highlights
- 1948 VFA Premiership

Arthur Middleton Rose (10 July 1919 – 28 April 2000) was an Australian rules footballer who played for the St Kilda Football Club in the Victorian Football League (VFL).

== Family ==
The son of Walter George Thomas Rose and Gladys Elsie Elizabeth Rose, nee Wilkins, Arthur Middleton Rose was born on 10 July 1919 at Cheltenham where his family ran a funeral business.

== Football ==
Arthur Rose started his football career in 1936 with the Cheltenham Juniors where he won the trophy for the best and fairest player in the Federal District League Juniors and was promoted to the Cheltenham seniors for the last three games of the season. From there he moved to St Kilda in 1937 where he made his senior debut against Collingwood in the final game of the season. He played a further 25 games over the next three seasons. He played his final two games for St Kilda in 1944 while on a period of leave from the Army.

== War Service ==
In 1941, Arthur Rose enlisted in the Australian Army and served in the Middle East, Borneo and New Guinea until his discharge in November 1945.

== Post War Football ==
In 1946 Rose joined Victorian Football Association side Brighton where he played for the next three years, finishing his senior level football career with a winning Grand Final appearance. In 1949 he was appointed as coach of the Cheltenham club where he had started his career thirteen years earlier.
