= Ern Trickey =

Australian rules footballer

Personal information
- Full name: Ernest William Trickey
- Born: 8 November 1933
- Died: 13 May 2011 (aged 77)
- Original team: Cheltenham
- Height: 185 cm (6 ft 1 in)
- Weight: 78 kg (172 lb)

Playing career^{1}
Years	Club	Games (Goals)
1953–1955	Fitzroy	12 (4)
1957	South Melbourne	4 (4)
Total		16 (8)
- ^{1} Playing statistics correct to the end of 1957.

Ernest William Trickey (8 November 1933 – 13 May 2011) was an Australian rules footballer who played for the Fitzroy Football Club and South Melbourne Football Club in the Victorian Football League (VFL).
