= John Hogan (footballer) =

Australian rules footballer

Personal information
- Full name: John Hogan
- Born: 29 December 1941
- Original team: Cheltenham
- Height: 180 cm (5 ft 11 in)
- Weight: 67 kg (148 lb)

Playing career^{1}
Years	Club	Games (Goals)
1960	Collingwood	2 (0)
- ^{1} Playing statistics correct to the end of 1960.

John Hogan (born 29 December 1941) is a former Australian rules footballer who played with Collingwood in the Victorian Football League (VFL).
