= Kevin Roberts (Australian footballer) =

Australian rules footballer (1939–2026)

Personal information
- Full name: Kevin Neilson Roberts
- Born: 11 April 1939
- Died: 26 June 2026 (aged 87)
- Original team: Cheltenham
- Height: 179 cm (5 ft 10 in)
- Weight: 76 kg (168 lb)
- Position: Half-forward flank

Playing career
Years	Club	Games (Goals)
1960–1963, 1965–1969	St Kilda	106 (110)

Kevin Neilson "Noofa" Roberts (11 April 1939 – 26 June 2026) was an Australian rules footballer who played with St Kilda in the Victorian Football League (VFL) during the 1960s.

Roberts was recruited from Cheltenham, where he played as a full-back winning Cheltenham Senior best & fairest and a Federal League best and fairest. A left footer, he became a half forward flanker at St Kilda and kicked three goals in a narrow semi final loss to Melbourne at the MCG in 1963. He often played on the half forward flank next to Darrel Baldock. He came off the bench as a reserve in the 1965 VFL Grand Final loss to Essendon, wearing number 24 in this match instead of his usual number 23. After kicking 17 goals in his first eight games in the 1966 VFL season, Roberts broke his collarbone against Melbourne and as a result missed the premiership win.

He also played for Oakleigh in the Victorian Football Association (VFA) after retiring from St.Kilda. Kevin played the 1970 and 1971 seasons for a total of 28 games and 23 goals. He played in the 1971 first semi final loss to Sandringham. Roberts returned to Cheltenham Football Club and played until 35 years old.

Later he returned to the St Kilda Football club as a player development officer, helping young recruits the likes of Tony Lockett. He also served as a senior runner for Alex Jesaulenko and Tony Jewell in the early 1980s and for Darrel Baldock in 1987. A regular at both Cheltenham and St.Kilda games over the years, Noofa is fondly remembered for his tremendous left foot drop kicks.
