= Hampton, Victoria =

Hampton
- Suburb
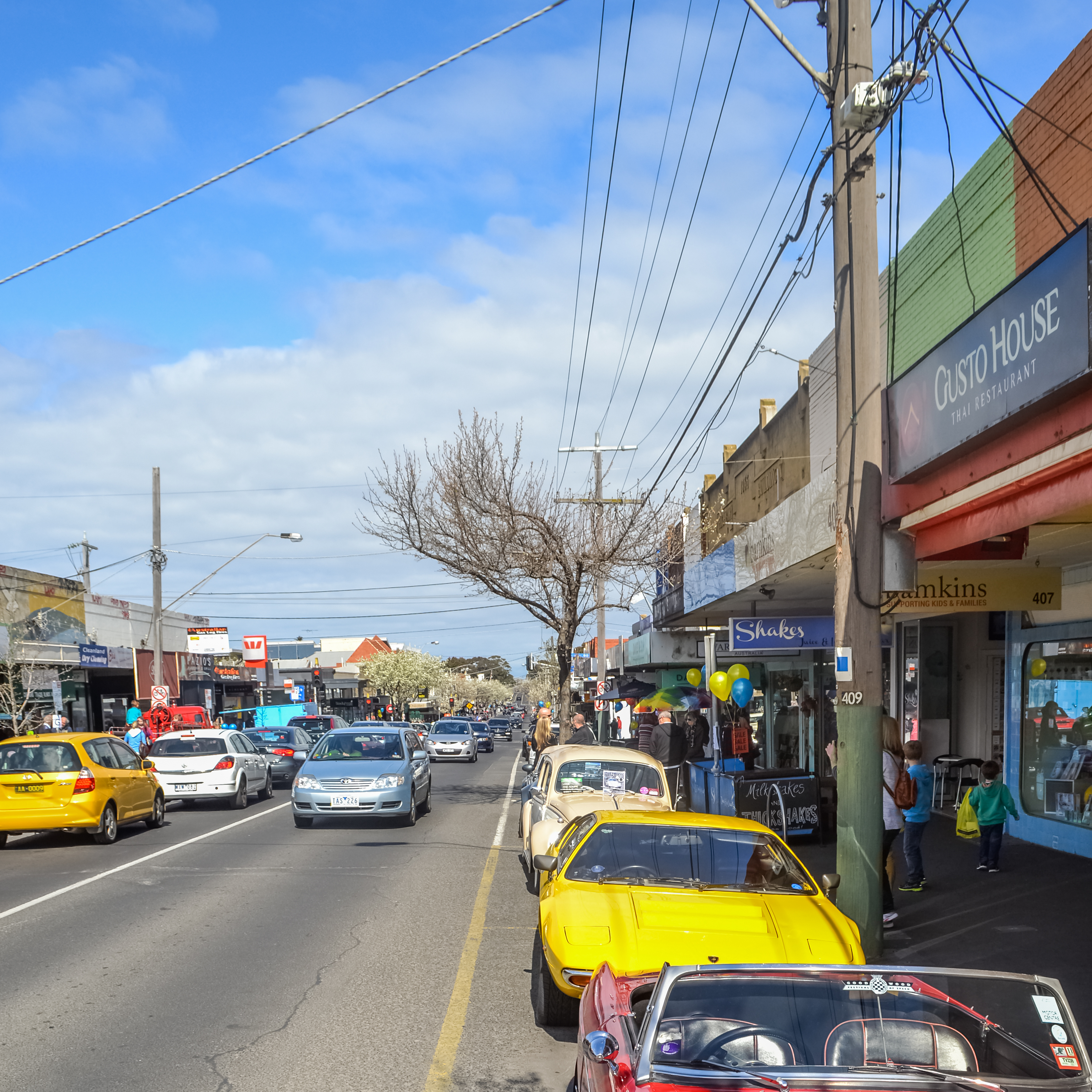
- Hampton shopping strip

- Interactive map of Hampton
- Coordinates: 37.937°S 145.009°E
- Country: Australia
- State: Victoria
- City: Melbourne
- LGA: City of Bayside
- Location: 14 km (8.7 mi) from Melbourne
- Established: 1850s

Government
  - State electorates: Brighton; Sandringham
  - Federal division: Goldstein

Area
  - Total: 4.0 km^{2} (1.5 sq mi)
- Elevation: 16 m (52 ft)

Population
  - Total: 13,518 (2021 census)
  - Density: 3,380/km^{2} (8,750/sq mi)
- Postcode: 3188
Suburbs around Hampton
Port Phillip	Brighton	Brighton East
Port Phillip	Hampton	Hampton East
Port Phillip	Sandringham	Highett

Hampton is a suburb in Melbourne, Victoria, Australia, 14 kilometres (9 mi) south-east of Melbourne's Central Business District, located within the City of Bayside local government area. Hampton recorded a population of 13,518 at the 2021 census.

Hampton is located in Southeast Melbourne, wedged between the suburbs of Brighton and Sandringham. Hampton has a shopping centre along the main road, Hampton Street, with more than 50 cafes and restaurants plus numerous fashion boutiques.

== History ==
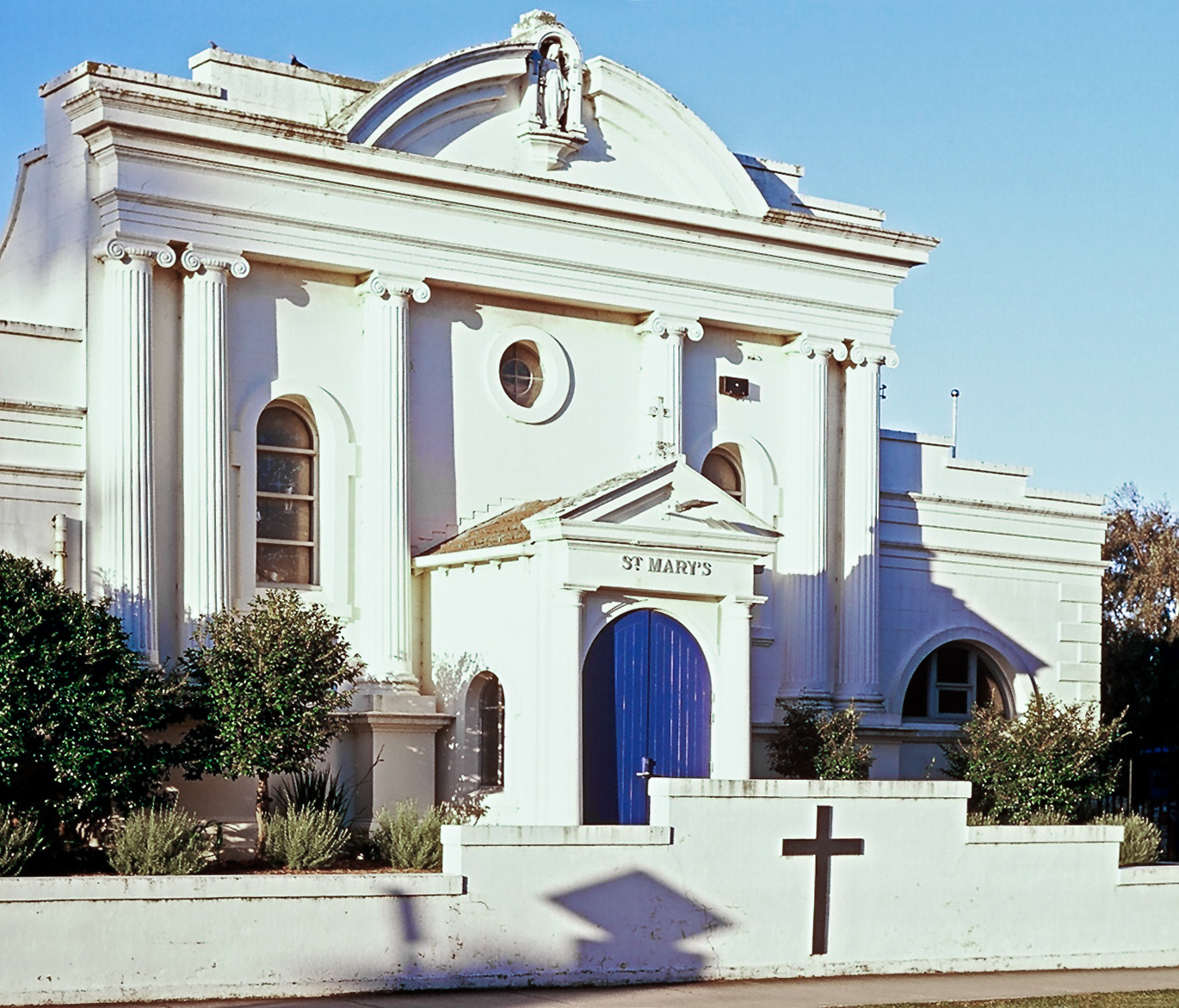
Hampton Catholic Church

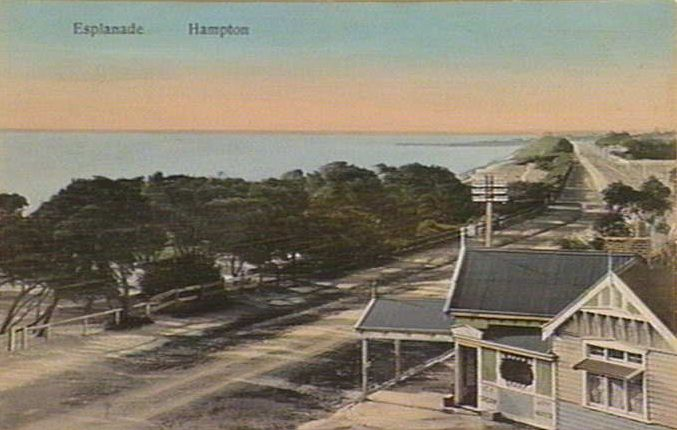
Esplanade, Hampton in 1908

Hampton, like Brighton, started off as a place of market gardens in the 1840s and 1850s, supplying fruits and vegetables for Melbourne. In the 1850s, interest started to grow in the beaches in the area as places for daytrips and holidays for Melburnians, particularly Picnic Point, on the beautiful bay foreshore of Hampton. This expanded when a railway line was built to Brighton Beach in the 1860s. In 1887, the railway line was extended to Sandringham, with a station servicing Picnic Point. It was called Retreat, after the Retreat Hotel at the Point. However, several landmarks in the area, including the beach, had been named Hampton, after a local market gardener Dyas Hampton, and as wealthy landowners began buying subdivided land in the area, they favored the name Hampton as it sounded more regal. The name was set when the station was renamed Hampton. Hampton Post Office opened on 1 July 1909.

The population continued to grow at the start of the new century, with war commission homes being built for returned WW1 soldiers. Rapid development occurred in the 1930s when the market gardens were subdivided, and today Hampton is part of Melbourne's suburban sprawl. In 1957 Hampton North Post Office opened near South Road.

The railway station (which is on the Sandringham Line) remains, although not the original building.

== Sport ==
The major football club in Hampton is the Hampton Rovers AFL Football Club who compete in the Victorian Amateur Football Association and SMJFL with a total of 22 teams.

The suburb also has a football team competing in the Southern Football League.

The main cricket club in the suburb is the Hampton Cricket Club which has teams in both turf and synthetic competitions. The club has both senior and junior teams.

The Hampton Junior Soccer Club caters for boys and girls from U7s to U18s.

The Hampton Angling club is located on the foreshore close to Australasian snapper fishing.

== Notable residents ==
- Zoe Daniel (born 1972/1973) former ABC journalist and Member for Goldstein
- Sir Bernard Evans (1905–1981) architect, army officer and Lord Mayor of Melbourne
- Stanislaw Halpern (1919–1969) artist
- Edward Laurie (1912–1989) barrister, soldier and political activist
- Frank Sedgman (born 1927) retired world No. 1 tennis player
- Hugh Simpson (1894–1968) farmer and administrator
- Professor Ron McCallum (born 1948) legal academic

== See also ==
- City of Sandringham – Hampton was previously within this former local government area.
- Hampton railway station, Melbourne
