= List of VFL debuts in 1914 =

Debuts in the Victorian Football League

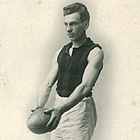
Frank 'Checker' Hughes made his VFL debut in 1914

The 1914 Victorian Football League (VFL) season was the eighteenth season of the VFL. The season saw 105 Australian rules footballers make their senior VFL debut and a further 30 transfer to new clubs having previously played in the VFL.

1914 was University's final season in the VFL.

== Summary ==
Summary of debuts in 1914
| Club | VFL debuts | Change of club |
|---|---|---|
| Carlton | 11 | 4 |
| Collingwood | 7 | 2 |
| Essendon | 8 | 4 |
| Fitzroy | 4 | 1 |
| Geelong | 4 | 1 |
| Melbourne | 18 | 7 |
| Richmond | 13 | 3 |
| South Melbourne | 11 | 3 |
| St Kilda | 15 | 3 |
| University | 14 | 2 |
| Total | 105 | 30 |

== Debuts ==
| Name | Club | Age at debut | Round debuted | Games | Goals | Notes |
|---|---|---|---|---|---|---|
| Percy Daykin | Carlton | 23 years, 292 days | 1 | 134 | 136 | |
| Charlie Fisher | Carlton | 21 years, 166 days | 2 | 111 | 147 | |
| Ted Brown | Carlton | 19 years, 214 days | 1 | 95 | 1 | Previously played for St Kilda |
| Steve Leehane | Carlton | 22 years, 187 days | 1 | 82 | 14 | |
| Dan Keily | Carlton | 21 years, 344 days | 1 | 53 | 1 | |
| Herb Burleigh | Carlton | 21 years, 329 days | 3 | 32 | 55 | |
| Jimmy Morris | Carlton | 23 years, 37 days | 17 | 26 | 14 | |
| George Calwell | Carlton | 22 years, 304 days | 2 | 24 | 3 | |
| Bill Cook | Carlton | 26 years, 266 days | 6 | 16 | 27 | |
| Stanley McKenzie | Carlton | 24 years, 20 days | 7 | 14 | 6 | Played first-class cricket for Tasmania |
| Jack Lowe | Carlton | 21 years, 186 days | 4 | 13 | 9 | Previously played for Collingwood |
| Jim Willis | Carlton | 22 years, 224 days | 1 | 10 | 1 | |
| Albert Scaddan | Carlton | 26 years, 177 days | 6 | 3 | 1 | Brother of Joe Scaddan |
| Joe Andrew | Carlton | 25 years, 43 days | 6 | 2 | 0 | |
| Arthur Harrison | Carlton | 22 years, 354 days | 1 | 1 | 1 | |
| Harry Curtis | Collingwood | 20 years, 296 days | 13 | 122 | 149 | Previously played for Carlton |
| Maurie Sheehy | Collingwood | 20 years, 324 days | 2 | 110 | 22 | |
| Gus Dobrigh | Collingwood | 21 years, 80 days | 2 | 88 | 33 | |
| Max Hislop | Collingwood | 18 years, 250 days | 2 | 9 | 4 | |
| Harry Matheson | Collingwood | 22 years, 331 days | 2 | 9 | 8 | Previously played for St Kilda and Melbourne. |
| Tom Pollard | Collingwood | 19 years, 313 days | 4 | 6 | 2 | |
| Les Huntington | Collingwood | 21 years, 346 days | 1 | 4 | 0 | |
| Charlie Mutch | Collingwood | 20 years, 279 days | 7 | 3 | 0 | |
| Colin Dufty | Collingwood | 24 years, 147 days | 1 | 1 | 1 | |
| Bert Day | Essendon | 20 years, 111 days | 14 | 68 | 0 | |
| Horrie Webster | Essendon | 25 years, 267 days | 3 | 23 | 13 | Previously played for South Melbourne. |
| Tommy Wade | Essendon | 20 years, 107 days | 11 | 23 | 4 | |
| Bill Dinsmore | Essendon | 27 years, 070 days | 1 | 13 | 17 | Previously played for Fitzroy. |
| Neil King | Essendon | 24 years, 299 days | 2 | 3 | 0 | |
| Harry Neate | Essendon | 20 years, 6 days | 2 | 3 | 0 | |
| Arthur Mann | Essendon | 24 years, 343 days | 12 | 3 | 0 | |
| Jim Freeman | Essendon | 24 years, 155 days | 1 | 2 | 0 | |
| Bob Rahilly | Essendon | 26 years, 294 days | 2 | 2 | 4 | Previously played for Fitzroy. |
| Basil Nehill | Essendon | 22 years, 354 days | 6 | 2 | 0 | Previously played for St Kilda. |
| Frank Hurren | Essendon | 20 years, 208 days | 18 | 2 | 1 | |
| Henry Elkington | Essendon | 24 years, 90 days | 5 | 1 | 0 | |
| Paddy Abbott | Fitzroy | 25 years, 103 days | 4 | 40 | 1 | Previously played for South Melbourne. |
| George Pattison | Fitzroy | 24 years, 341 days | 10 | 8 | 0 | |
| Arthur Jones | Fitzroy | 22 years, 202 days | 2 | 7 | 3 | |
| Bob Teasdale | Fitzroy | 22 years, 336 days | 6 | 1 | 0 | |
| Stan Rodgerson | Fitzroy | 20 years, 70 days | 18 | 1 | 0 | |
| Bill Moulden | Geelong | 24 years, 299 days | 1 | 34 | 2 | |
| Harry Allen | Geelong | 23 years, 353 days | 3 | 20 | 6 | |
| Jack Blencowe | Geelong | 23 years, 34 days | 10 | 2 | 2 | Previously played for Essendon |
| Gordon Burleigh | Geelong | 25 years, 53 days | 4 | 1 | 0 | |
| Harold Conradi | Geelong | 19 years, 299 days | 5 | 1 | 0 | |
| George Walker | Melbourne | 19 years, 346 days | 1 | 49 | 0 | |
| Alec Gray | Melbourne | 22 years, 355 days | 2 | 52 | 2 | |
| Jack Huntington | Melbourne | 20 years, 337 days | 1 | 43 | 43 | |
| Tim Collins | Melbourne | 24 years, 122 days | 1 | 20 | 20 | |
| Bert Trahair | Melbourne | 22 years, 238 days | 1 | 18 | 7 | |
| Vic Gordon | Melbourne | 23 years, 167 days | 1 | 15 | 4 | Previously played for St Kilda. |
| Jack Connole | Melbourne | 23 years, 312 days | 7 | 14 | 12 | |
| Arthur Best | Melbourne | 23 years, 229 days | 6 | 12 | 30 | Previously played for St Kilda. |
| Billy Quinn | Melbourne | 23 years, 286 days | 3 | 11 | 2 | |
| Alex Fraser | Melbourne | 21 years, 346 days | 16 | 10 | 2 | |
| Rupe Lowell | Melbourne | 19 years, 239 days | 5 | 9 | 0 | Previously played for Essendon. |
| Bill Brunier | Melbourne | 25 years, 88 days | 15 | 9 | 8 | |
| Alf Williamson | Melbourne | 18 years, 225 days | 7 | 8 | 5 | Previously played for Carlton. |
| John Daly | Melbourne | 23 years, 196 days | 11 | 8 | 0 | |
| Les Smith | Melbourne | 22 years, 61 days | 4 | 7 | 1 | |
| Roy MacDonald | Melbourne | 22 years, 327 days | 11 | 8 | 0 | |
| Cliff Burge | Melbourne | 21 years, 363 days | 1 | 5 | 1 | |
| Percy Colee | Melbourne | 21 years, 165 days | 1 | 5 | 3 | |
| Harry Britter | Melbourne | 22 years, 313 days | 2 | 5 | 5 | |
| Eric Parsons | Melbourne | 23 years, 96 days | 2 | 2 | 0 | |
| Jack Woolley | Melbourne | 27 years, 150 days | 4 | 2 | 2 | Previously played for Essendon. |
| Aubrey MacKenzie | Melbourne | 19 years, 268 days | 14 | 2 | 0 | |
| Herbert Roberts | Melbourne | 23 years, 142 days | 1 | 1 | 0 | |
| Wal Riddington | Melbourne | 20 years, 213 days | 2 | 1 | 0 | |
| Roy Gray | Melbourne | 21 years, 197 days | 4 | 1 | 0 | Previously played for Collingwood. |
| George Bayliss | Richmond | 19 years, 145 days | 17 | 89 | 217 | |
| Frank Hughes | Richmond | 20 years, 072 days | 3 | 87 | 51 | |
| Reg Hede | Richmond | 19 years, 254 days | 10 | 85 | 1 | |
| Artie Bettles | Richmond | 23 years, 38 days | 2 | 73 | 0 | |
| Bill Thomas | Richmond | 27 years, 173 days | 2 | 62 | 3 | Previously played for South Melbourne. Father of Len Thomas. |
| Bill Nolan | Richmond | 25 years, 233 days | 1 | 30 | 4 | |
| Jack Cronk | Richmond | 23 years, 283 days | 2 | 23 | 11 | |
| Allan Granger | Richmond | 19 years, 361 days | 15 | 11 | 11 | |
| Bob McKendry | Richmond | 23 years, 250 days | 1 | 6 | 1 | |
| George McLear | Richmond | 22 years, 247 days | 1 | 3 | 0 | |
| Bill Thorpe | Richmond | 20 years, 122 days | 3 | 2 | 2 | |
| George Driscoll | Richmond | 20 years, 218 days | 15 | 2 | 0 | |
| Harry Maynard | Richmond | 24 years, 97 days | 17 | 2 | 0 | |
| Len Gibb | Richmond | 25 years, 220 days | 4 | 1 | 0 | Previously played for Collingwood. |
| Wal Rogers | Richmond | 25 years, 29 days | 8 | 1 | 0 | |
| Dave Smith | Richmond | 29 years, 267 days | 8 | 1 | 3 | Previously played for Essendon. |
| Harry Morgan | South Melbourne | 24 years, 345 days | 1 | 60 | 100 | |
| Alan O'Donoghue | South Melbourne | 22 years, 340 days | 3 | 44 | 15 | Previously played for Richmond |
| Ben Hair | South Melbourne | 21 years, 208 days | 1 | 43 | 3 | |
| Herb Matthews | South Melbourne | 19 years, 291 days | 10 | 32 | 27 | Son Herbie Matthews won the 1940 Brownlow Medal |
| George Payne | South Melbourne | 20 years, 176 days | 5 | 26 | 14 | |
| Tom Bollard | South Melbourne | 23 years, 268 days | 13 | 24 | 0 | |
| Claude Thomas | South Melbourne | 23 years, 24 days | 3 | 13 | 0 | |
| Percy Jackson | South Melbourne | 20 years, 066 days | 7 | 8 | 5 | |
| Harold Bennett | South Melbourne | 19 years, 324 days | 1 | 7 | 0 | Previously played for University |
| Charlie Jones | South Melbourne | 25 years, 223 days | 9 | 7 | 1 | |
| Bill Hennington | South Melbourne | | 4 | 6 | 0 | |
| Wally Laidlaw | South Melbourne | 22 years, 331 days | 10 | 3 | 0 | |
| Jack O'Brien | South Melbourne | 21 years, 116 days | 9 | 2 | 2 | |
| Herb Joolen | South Melbourne | 23 years, 339 days | 16 | 1 | 1 | Previously played for Melbourne. |
| Pat Maloney | St Kilda | 20 years, 177 days | 18 | 44 | 8 | |
| Norm Turnbull | St Kilda | 19 years, 314 days | 1 | 31 | 14 | |
| Bill Lowrie | St Kilda | 21 years, 161 days | 9 | 30 | 27 | |
| Algy Sharp | St Kilda | 24 years, 355 days | 10 | 21 | 29 | |
| Orm Fowler | St Kilda | 22 years, 177 days | 6 | 9 | 11 | Previously played for Fitzroy. |
| Harry Jane | St Kilda | 20 years, 299 days | 8 | 10 | 1 | Previously played for Carlton. |
| Roy Farmer | St Kilda | 21 years, 139 days | 1 | 8 | 2 | |
| Bobby Donald | St Kilda | 20 years, 46 days | 1 | 7 | 2 | |
| Bert Chapman | St Kilda | 22 years, 152 days | 2 | 7 | 1 | |
| Stan Brady | St Kilda | 27 years, 40 days | 6 | 7 | 5 | |
| Harry Horsenail | St Kilda | 22 years, 223 days | 18 | 6 | 2 | |
| Len Phillips | St Kilda | 24 years, 11 days | 1 | 5 | 6 | |
| Jack Watt | St Kilda | 24 years, 251 days | 13 | 5 | 3 | Previously played for Geelong and Melbourne. |
| Ernie Foo | St Kilda | 22 years, 290 days | 4 | 4 | 2 | |
| Angus McDonald | St Kilda | 23 years, 181 days | 1 | 2 | 1 | |
| Vern Couttie | St Kilda | 23 years, 114 days | 18 | 1 | 1 | |
| George McDonald | St Kilda | 21 years, 188 days | 18 | 1 | 1 | |
| Clarrie Roberts | St Kilda | 25 years, 298 days | 18 | 1 | 0 | |
| Percy Rodriguez | University | 21 years, 110 days | 1 | 17 | 1 | |
| Wally Don | University | 22 years, 226 days | 3 | 15 | 0 | Previously played for Carlton |
| Leslie Marks | University | 21 years, 132 days | 1 | 14 | 13 | |
| Heinrich Schrader | University | 20 years, 141 days | 1 | 13 | 4 | Played first-class cricket for Victoria |
| Gerald Johnston | University | 22 years, 343 days | 6 | 11 | 0 | |
| Frank Cameron | University | 22 years, 57 days | 9 | 8 | 0 | |
| Claude Bryan | University | 21 years, 123 days | 1 | 7 | 0 | |
| Cyril Seelenmeyer | University | 22 years, 3 days | 2 | 6 | 1 | Received the Military Cross for gallantry during WWI |
| Reuben Patton | University | 30 years, 267 days | 3 | 6 | 0 | |
| Howard Stafford | University | 21 years, 76 days | 8 | 5 | 2 | |
| Bob Heatley | University | 19 years, 12 days | 14 | 4 | 0 | |
| Jim Houghton | University | 22 years, 245 days | 5 | 3 | 0 | |
| Will Houghton | University | 24 years, 110 days | 1 | 2 | 0 | |
| Gordon Morrissey | University | 20 years, 045 days | 17 | 2 | 0 | |
| Cyril Steele | University | 22 years, 353 days | 6 | 1 | 0 | Previously played for Melbourne |
| Adrian Farmer | University | 19 years, 161 days | 17 | 1 | 2 | |
