= Gordon Munro =

Australian rules footballer (1893–1951)

Personal information
- Full name: Gordon McKenzie Munro
- Born: 17 December 1893; Frankston, Victoria
- Died: 16 April 1951 (aged 57); Macarthur, Victoria

Playing career^{1}
Years	Club	Games (Goals)
1920	St Kilda	1 (0)
- ^{1} Playing statistics correct to the end of 1920.

Gordon McKenzie Munro (17 December 1893 – 16 April 1951) was an Australian rules footballer who played with St Kilda in the Victorian Football League (VFL).

== Family ==
The son of John Munro (1859–1923), and Caroline Munro (1860–1932), née Lockhart, Gordon McKenzie Munro was born at Frankston, Victoria on 17 December 1893.

He married Adelaide Ina Jean Twist (1898–1955) in 1921; they had four children.

== Football ==
=== Hawthorn (VFA) ===
He played for a number of seasons with Hawthorn in the VFA.

=== South Melbourne (VFL) ===
In the 1920 pre-season, he was training with South Melbourne; and, according to 'Kickero', "Munro, formerly of Hawthorn, a big man with a somewhat awkward style, bids fair to become a player of the stamp of Les. Charge, the old Southern favorite follower".

=== St Kilda (VFL) ===
Prior to the 7 June 1920 match against Collingwood, the St Kilda coach, George Sparrow, and a number of St Kilda players resigned in protest to the selection of Billy Schmidt. Other players who had been selected to play – Arnold Beitzel, Albert Bragg, Bill Cubbins, Wels Eicke, Bill Lowrie, Pat Maloney – refused to play and, in order to field a team, a number of last-minute replacements were used by a desperate St Kilda, having to play Collingwood at Collingwood, including three "first game players", Munro (whose VFL career consisted of this one, single game), Ted Bulmer (aged 30 on debut, who only played one more senior VFL game), and Steve Gill (who only played one more senior VFL game).

Although St Kilda lost the match, due to the positional and tactical changes made by the new playing-coach, Roy Cazaly, at half-time, they out-scored Collingwood in the second half of the match – Collingwood, which had scored 11 goals by half-time, could only score a single goal in the second half, while St Kilda were able to score four – and Munro was one of St Kilda's best players on the day.

"Munro, who played for St Kilda on Monday, had not received his permit to appear with that club. He had played with Hawthorn, and had been training with South Melbourne." – The Herald, 11 June 1920.

== Military service ==
Working as a stock and station agent, Munro enlisted in the Second AIF on 5 June 1942, and served overseas with the 9th Battalion, Australian Military Forces; he was discharged on 20 September 1945.

== Death ==
He died (suddenly) at his home in Macarthur, Victoria on 16 April 1951.
