= Beitzel =

Beitzel is a surname. Notable people with the surname include

- Arnold Beitzel (1897–1982), Australian rules footballer
- Barry Beitzel (born 1934), Australian rules footballer
- Barry J. Beitzel (born 1942), American evangelicals Old Testament scholar, geographer, cartographer, and translator of the Bible
- Devon Beitzel (born 1988), American former professional basketball point guard
- Harry Beitzel (1927–2017), Australian football umpire, print, radio and television sports broadcaster
- Wendell R. Beitzel (born 1943), American Republican politician from Maryland

== See also ==
- Beitzel Peak, southeast of Minaret Peak in the Marble Hills, Heritage Range
