= Scaddan =

Scaddan may refer to:

- Scaddan, Western Australia, a town in Western Australia
- Albert Scaddan, Australian rules footballer
- Joe Scaddan, Australian rules footballer
- John Scaddan, former premier of Western Australia
- Scaddan Ministry
