= Chappell Peak =

Mountain in Antarctica

Chappell Peak (79°57′S 82°54′W) is a peak, 1,860 metres (6,100 ft) high, standing 3 nautical miles (6 km) south of Schoeck Peak on the south side of the Enterprise Hills, overlooking the head of Horseshoe Valley in the Heritage Range. It was mapped by the United States Geological Survey from surveys and from U.S. Navy air photos, 1961–66, and named by the Advisory Committee on Antarctic Names for Richard L. Chappell, scientific aide at Little America V Station in 1957.

== See also ==
- Mountains in Antarctica
