= Strong Peak =

Mountain in Antarctica

Strong Peak (79°56′S 82°18′W) is a small sharp peak at the end of a ridge in the Enterprise Hills, standing 3 nautical miles (6 km) west-southwest of Parrish Peak and overlooking the head of Horseshoe Valley, Heritage Range. It was mapped by the United States Geological Survey (USGS) from surveys and U.S. Navy air photos from 1961 to 1966. It was named by the Advisory Committee on Antarctic Names (US-ACAN) for Jack E. Strong, a United States Antarctic Research Program (USARP) biologist at Palmer Station in 1965.
