= Sponholz Peak =

Mountain in Antarctica

Sponholz Peak (80°8′S 83°0′W) is a sharp peak, 1,730 m, standing 2.5 nautical miles (4.6 km) south of Moulder Peak in Liberty Hills, Heritage Range, Antarctica. It was named by the Advisory Committee on Antarctic Names (US-ACAN) for Martin P. Sponholz, a United States Antarctic Research Program (USARP) meteorologist and a member of the winter party at Plateau Station in 1966. Sponholz is commemorated especially for his mathematical applications and formulas regarding inversion wind systems. Sponholz later served as a professor of physical sciences at Martin Luther College in New Ulm, Minnesota, USA.
