= Hudak Peak =

Mountain in Antarctica

Hudak Peak (79°58′S 81°40′W) is a peak rising to 1,440 metres (4,720 ft) immediately south of Plummer Glacier in the Douglas Peaks of the Heritage Range, in the Ellsworth Mountains of Antarctica. It was named by the Advisory Committee on Antarctic Names in 2004 after Curtis M. Hudak, a geologist on the United States Antarctic Research Program 1979–80 Ellsworth Mountains expedition.

== See also ==
- Mountains in Antarctica
