= Hurren =

Hurren is a surname. Notable people with the surname include:

- Frank Hurren (1894–1963), Australian rules footballer
- Larry Hurren (1955–1996), Canadian outlaw biker
