= Craddock Crags =

Cliff summits in the Ellsworth Mountains, Antarctica

Craddock Crags (80°16′S 82°8′W) are steep, rugged rock summits that rise to about 1,450 metres (4,760 ft) just east of Beitzel Peak in the Marble Hills, Heritage Range, Ellsworth Mountains. They were named by the Advisory Committee on Antarctic Names (2004) after John P. Craddock, a geologist who was a member of a United States Antarctic Research Program 1979–80 Ellsworth Mountains expedition.
