= Trahair =

Trahair is a surname. Notable people with the surname include:

- Aaron Trahair (born 1976), Australian basketballer
- Bert Trahair (1891–1953), Australian rules footballer
