= Kickero =

- Alternative pronunciation of Cicero.
- Nom de guerre of Melbourne sports journalist Thomas Wallis Kelynack (1868–1936)
