= Guarcello Peak =

Mountain in Antarctica

Guarcello Peak (79°55′S 83°10′W) is a peak, 2,050 metres (6,730 ft) high, located 3.5 nautical miles (6 km) south-southeast of Mount Dolence in the Enterprise Hills of the Heritage Range in Antarctica. It was mapped by the United States Geological Survey from surveys and U.S. Navy air photos from 1961 to 1966, and was named by the Advisory Committee on Antarctic Names for Dominic Guarcello, a meteorologist at Little America V Station in 1958. Guarcello Peak was first successfully climbed on 23 December 2011, by Simon Abrahams, Ralf Laier and Todd Passey.

== See also ==
- Mountains in Antarctica
