= Arthur Mann (disambiguation) =

Arthur Mann (1948–1999) was a Scottish footballer and manager

Arthur Mann may also refer to:

- Arthur Mann (rugby league), English rugby league player
- Arthur Mann (Australian footballer) (1889–1949), Australian rules footballer
- Arthur Henry Mann (1850–1929), English organist and composer
- Arthur Henry Mann (journalist) (1876–1972), British newspaper journalist
- Arthur L. Mann Memorial Library, public library in West Paris, Maine

== See also ==
- Art Mann, American television presenter
