= Herbert Roberts =

Herbert Roberts may refer to:

- Herbie Roberts (1905–1944), English footballer
- Herbert Roberts (footballer) (1890–?), Australian footballer for Melbourne
- Ray Roberts (politician) (full name Herbert Ray Roberts) (1913–1992), US congressman
