= Mount Geissel =

Mountain in Ellsworth Land, Antarctica

Mount Geissel (80°25′S 81°47′W) is a mountain, 1,430 metres (4,700 ft) high, standing 3 nautical miles (6 km) south of Mount Simmons in the Independence Hills of the Heritage Range, Antarctica. It was named by the Advisory Committee on Antarctic Names for Robert H. Geissel, a United States Antarctic Research Program geomagnetist and seismologist at Plateau Station in 1966.

== See also ==
- Mountains in Antarctica
