= Lippert Peak =

Mountain in Ellsworth Land, Antarctica

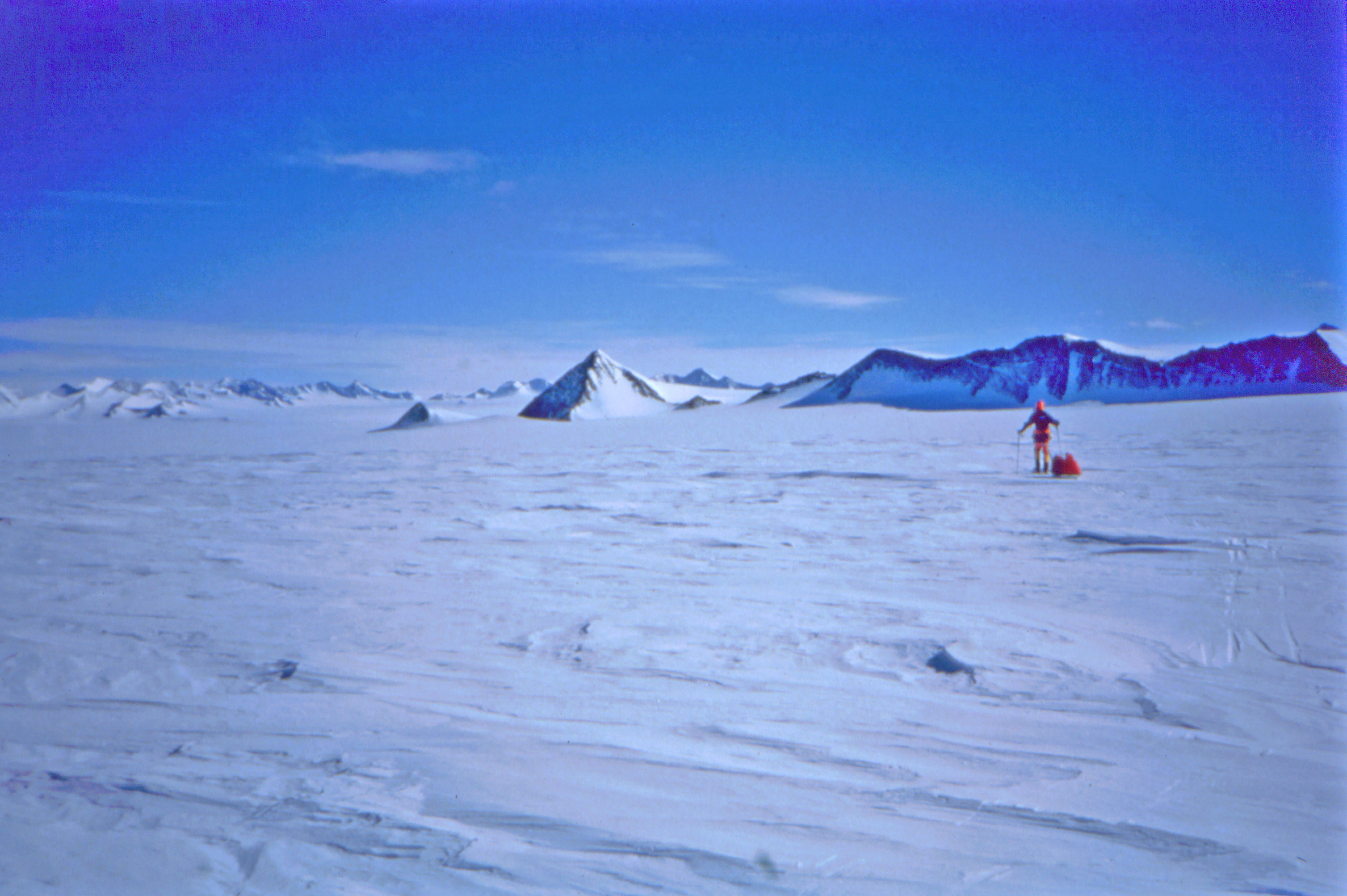
The Horseshoe Valley with the cone formed Lippert Peak

Lippert Peak (79°59′S 81°56′W) is a sharp pointed peak at the end of a ridge that extends west from the Douglas Peaks into Horseshoe Valley. It is located 5 nautical miles (9 km) southeast of Strong Peak (which this peak resembles) in the Heritage Range, Antarctica.

It was mapped by the United States Geological Survey from surveys and U.S. Navy air photos from 1961 to 1966. In 1965, it was named by the Advisory Committee on Antarctic Names for George E. Lippert, a United States Antarctic Research Program biologist at Palmer Station.

== See also ==
- Mountains in Antarctica
