= Walter Rogers =

Walter Rogers may refer to:

- Walter Rogers (footballer) (fl. 1883–1908), English footballer
- Walter Rogers (rugby union), English international rugby union player
- Walter E. Rogers (1908–2001), Democratic congressman from Texas
- Walter S. Rogers (1870–1937), American illustrator
- Walter B. Rogers (1865–1939), staff conductor for Victor Records
- Wal Rogers, Australian rules footballer
- Walter Rogers, founder of the Rogers Group, a Mauritius-based conglomerate
- Walter Henry Rogers, Attorney General of Louisiana from 1888 to 1892

== See also ==
- Walt Rogers, member of the Iowa House of Representatives
