= Shoemaker Peak =

Mountain in Antarctica

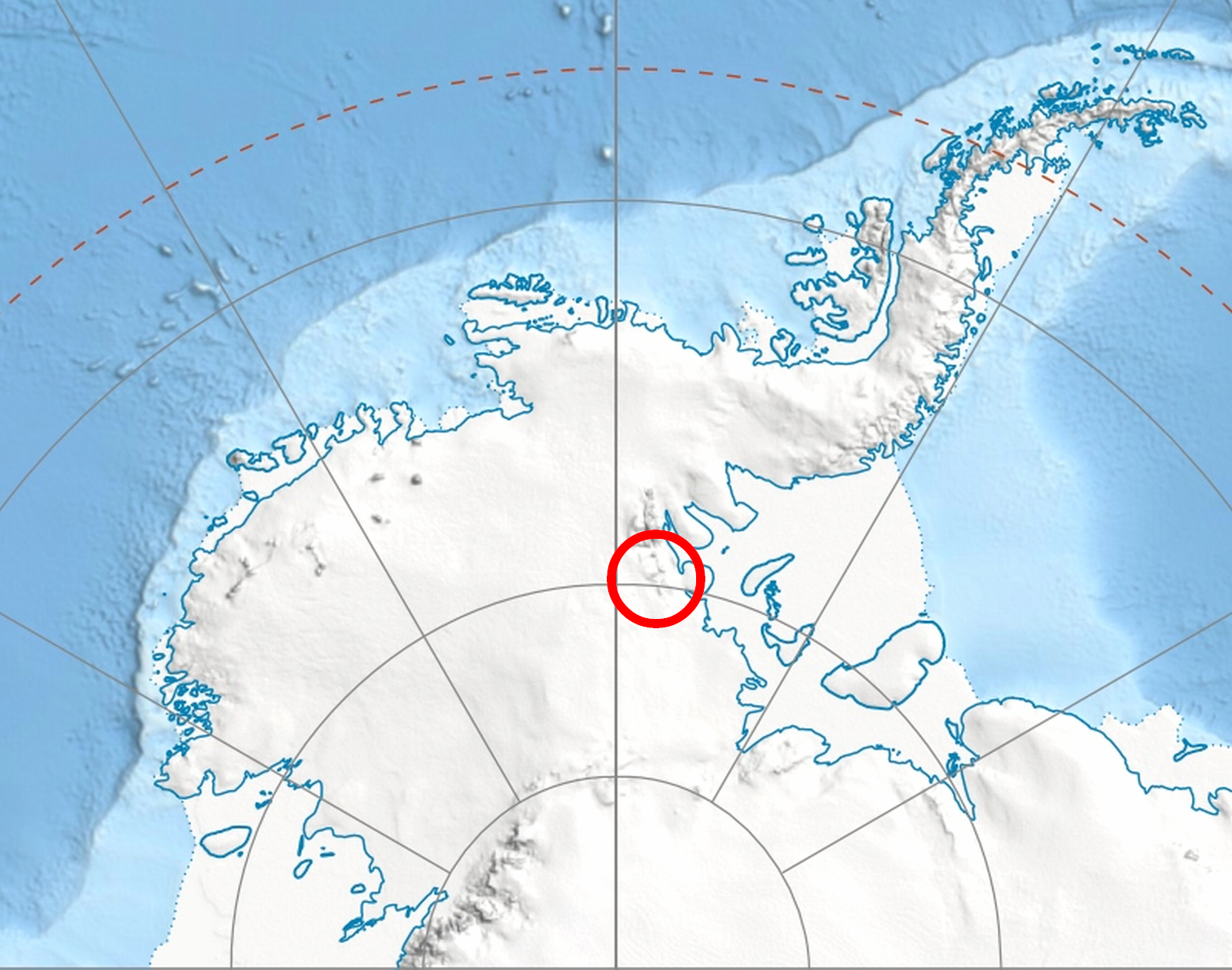
- Location of Heritage Range in Western Antarctica.

Highest point
- Coordinates: 79°51′S 82°19′W

Geography
- Parent range: Heritage Range

Shoemaker Peak is a peak on the east side of Ahrnsbrak Glacier, 3 miles (4.8 km) east-southeast of Sutton Peak in the Enterprise Hills, Heritage Range, Antarctica. It was mapped by the United States Geological Survey (USGS) from surveys and U.S. Navy air photos from 1961 to 1966. It was named by the Advisory Committee on Antarctic Names (US-ACAN) for Dawaine A. Shoemaker, a meteorologist at Little America V Station in 1958.
