= Gliozzi =

Gliozzi is an Italian surname. Notable people with the surname include:

- Ettore Gliozzi (born 1995), Italian footballer
- Ferdinando Gliozzi (born 1940), Italian physicist

== See also ==
- Gliozzi Peak, a mountain of Ellsworth Land, Antarctica
