= Rhodes Bluff =

Rhodes Bluff (79°50′S 83°20′W) is a bare rock bluff 2 nautical miles (3.7 km) northwest of Mount Dolence, forming the northwest end of Enterprise Hills in the Heritage Range of Antarctica. Mapped by air photos taken by the United States Geological Survey (USGS) and U.S. Navy from 1961 to 1966, the bluff was named after Lieutenant Joseph J. Rhodes, who was in charge of the maintenance program at McMurdo Station in 1966.
