= Fordell =

Fordell may refer to:

- Fordell Castle, a restored 16th-century tower house in Fife, Scotland
  - John Henderson, 5th of Fordell (1605–1650)
- Mount Fordell, a mountain in Antarctica
- Fordell, New Zealand, a settlement in the Whanganui District
