= Stan Huntington =

Australian rules footballer

Personal information
- Full name: Stanley Humphrey Huntington
- Born: 17 April 1889; South Yarra, Victoria
- Died: 13 April 1980 (aged 90); Brighton East, Victoria
- Original team: Essendon Association

Playing career^{1}
Years	Club	Games (Goals)
1919	Melbourne	3 (3)
- ^{1} Playing statistics correct to the end of 1919.

Stanley Humphrey Huntington (17 April 1889 – 13 April 1980) was an Australian rules footballer who played with Melbourne in the Victorian Football League (VFL).

His brothers Les and Jack also played VFL football, as did his son Bill.
