= Urban Point =

Rock point in Antarctica

Coordinates: 79°48′S 82°0′W

Urban Point is a sharp rock point lying 2 nautical miles (3.7 km) east of the terminus of Ahrnsbrak Glacier on the north side of the Enterprise Hills, Heritage Range. Mapped by United States Geological Survey (USGS) from surveys and U.S. Navy air photos, 1961–66. Named by Advisory Committee on Antarctic Names (US-ACAN) for Verdis D. Urban, meteorologist with the Ellsworth Station winter party, 1958.

== See also ==
- Bell Valley
