= Mal Lowrie =

Australian rules footballer

Personal information
- Full name: Malcolm Henry Lowrie
- Born: 10 March 1898; South Melbourne, Victoria
- Died: 19 February 1919 (aged 20); Carlton, Victoria
- Original team: Port Melbourne Railway United
- Height: 177 cm (5 ft 10 in)
- Weight: 73 kg (161 lb)

Playing career^{1}
| Years | Club | Games (Goals) |
| 1917 | South Melbourne | 4 (3) |
- ^{1} Playing statistics correct to the end of 1917.

Malcolm Henry Lowrie (10 March 1898 – 19 February 1919) was an Australian rules footballer who played with South Melbourne in the Victorian Football League (VFL).
