= William Angwin (footballer) =

Australian rules footballer (1891–1963)

Personal information
- Full name: William Charles Angwin
- Nickname: Bill
- Born: 13 March 1891; North Melbourne, Victoria
- Died: 4 August 1963 (aged 72); Melbourne
- Original teams: Port Melbourne Railway United / Hirshoe Warriors

Playing career^{1}
Years	Club	Games (Goals)
1913	Melbourne	3 (0)
1913–1914	St Kilda	6 (1)
Total		9 (1)
- ^{1} Playing statistics correct to the end of 1914.

William Charles Angwin (13 March 1891 – 4 August 1963) was an Australian rules footballer who played in the Victorian Football League (VFL). Angwin played three games for Melbourne early in the 1913 VFL season before switching to St Kilda later in the season, playing six games and kicking one goal in the year and a half he was at the club. The one goal that Angwin kicked for his career was the winning goal in a match against Essendon. Angwin was a former Port Melbourne Railway United player who also played in Western Australia before his VFL career.
