= Gliozzi Peak =

Mountain in Antarctica

Coordinates: 80°1′S 81°31′W

Gliozzi Peak is a peak, 1,475 metres (4,840 ft) high, standing 3 nautical miles (6 km) south of Plummer Glacier in the Douglas Peaks of the Heritage Range, Antarctica. It was named by the Advisory Committee on Antarctic Names for James Gliozzi, a glaciologist on the United States Antarctic Research Program South Pole—Queen Maud Land Traverse I of 1964–65.

== See also ==
- Mountains in Antarctica
