= Martin Sponholz =

American meteorologist

Martin Sponholz is an American meteorologist. He was born in Burlington, Wisconsin. He moved to Milwaukee at the age of five (after the death of his parents) to live with relatives. Today he resides in New Ulm, Minnesota with his wife Nancy.

Sponholz has distinguished himself in the field of meteorological research serving on two expeditions to Antarctica. He was Chief Meteorologist on a team of eight at Plateau Station in Antarctica. He is credited with discovering "inversion winds", defined in Weather and Climate of the Antarctic, and represented the U.S. on the Japanese Antarctic Research Expedition. He authored Among the Magi, the story of his Antarctic journey during the 1960s. Martin received the Antarctica Service Medal for courage, devotion and sacrifice from President Lyndon B. Johnson in 1967. Sponholz Peak in Antarctica is named in honor of Martin. Leaving the research world to teach, Martin began serving as professor of science at Martin Luther College in 1982 and continued teaching until the 2010-2011 school year, after which he retired.
