= Douglas Peaks =

Mountain range in Antarctica

The Douglas Peaks (80°0′S 81°25′W) are the group of peaks standing south of Plummer Glacier in the southeast extremity of the Heritage Range, Ellsworth Mountains, Antarctica. They were named by the University of Minnesota Ellsworth Mountains Party, 1962–63, for Lieutenant Commander John Douglas, a U.S. Navy LC-47 Dakota pilot who flew to the area to evacuate one of the party for emergency appendectomy.

Gliozzi Peak — at 1,475 metres (4,840 ft) — is the highest peak in the group — and was first climbed by Di Gilbert. A second ascent by the northwest ridge was achieved by British climbers Dominic Spicer and Rob Jarvis in 2009.

== See also ==
- Mountains in Antarctica

Geographical features include:

- Gliozzi Peak
- Hudak Peak
- Lippert Peak
- Plummer Glacier
