= Seal Glacier =

Glacier in Antarctica

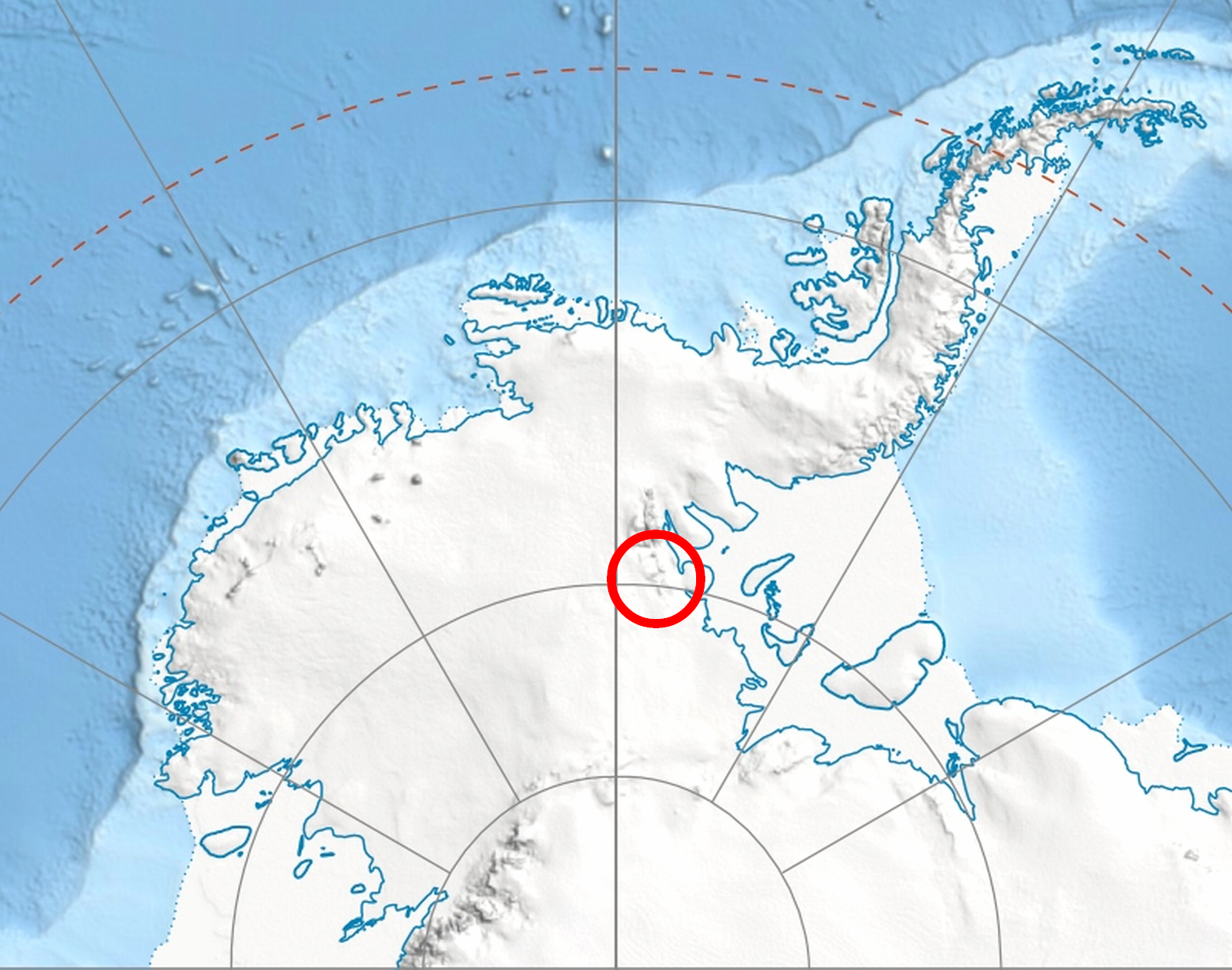
- Location of Heritage Range in Western Antarctica

- Location within Antarctica
- Location: Ellsworth Land
- Coordinates: 79°53′00″S 81°50′00″W
- Thickness: unknown
- Status: unknown

Seal Glacier (79°53′S 81°50′W) is a small glacier draining east, located just north of Parrish Peak in the Enterprise Hills, Heritage Range. Mapped by United States Geological Survey (USGS) from surveys and U.S. Navy air photos, 1961–66. Named by Advisory Committee on Antarctic Names (US-ACAN) for radioman G.L. Seal, U.S. Navy, who up to Operation Deepfreeze 1966 had contributed to efficient communications during four austral summer seasons.

== See also ==
- List of glaciers in the Antarctic
- Glaciology
