= Moulder Peak =

Mountain in Ellsworth Land, Antarctica

Moulder Peak (80°5′S 83°2′W) is a sharp peak 3 nautical miles (6 km) southeast of Mount Rosenthal in the Liberty Hills of the Heritage Range, Antarctica. It was named by the Advisory Committee on Antarctic Names for storekeeper Andrew B. Moulder, U.S. Navy, who was fatally injured in a cargo unloading accident at South Pole Station on February 13, 1966.

== See also ==
- Mountains in Antarctica
