= Marble Hills =

Coordinates: 80°17′S 82°5′W

The Marble Hills are a group of mainly ice-free hills in West Antarctica. They are located on the west side of Horseshoe Valley, between the Liberty Hills and Independence Hills in the southern part of the Heritage Range, Ellsworth Mountains. The hills were named by the University of Minnesota Ellsworth Mountains Party, 1962–63, because the rocks in these hills are composed of marble.

== Features ==
Geographical features include:

- Beitzel Peak
- Craddock Crags
- Minaret Peak
- Mount Fordell
