= Barry Beitzel =

Australian rules footballer (1934–2025)

Personal information
- Full name: Barry Emson Beitzel
- Born: 20 December 1934
- Died: 26 February 2025 (aged 90)
- Original team: Sale
- Height: 182 cm (6 ft 0 in)
- Weight: 72 kg (159 lb)

Playing career
Years	Club	Games (Goals)
1955	Carlton	2 (0)

Barry Beitzel (20 December 1934 – 26 February 2025) was an Australian rules footballer who played for the Carlton Football Club in the Victorian Football League (VFL).

Beitzel transferred from Morwell to Sale in mid 1954 when he got Promoted in his job at the Post Master General department. In 1955 he was recruited by Carlton where he played two senior games. Unable to play another senior game Beitzel decided to transfer to Williamstown (VFA) mid 1957. He joined his elder brother, Eric. Beitzel played in the 1958 and 1959 Williamstown premiership teams. He retired after 1960 season.

Barry was the cousin of former VFL umpire Harry Beitzel. Beitzel died on 26 February 2025, at the age of 90.
