= Bell Valley =

Small valley in Ellsworth Land, Antarctica

- Location within Antarctica

Geography
- Location: Enterprise Hills, Heritage Range, Ellsworth Land, Antarctica
- Coordinates: 79°51′S 82°0′W
- Interactive map of Bell Valley

Bell Valley is a small, mainly ice-free valley lying south of Urban Point in the Enterprise Hills, Heritage Range. It was named by the University of Minnesota geological party after the Bell helicopters used by the party in the exploration of the area in 1963–64.
