= Frank Gomez (footballer) =

Australian rules footballer (1878–1954)

Personal information
- Full name: Francis Patrick Gomez
- Born: 17 August 1878; Warrnambool, Victoria
- Died: 17 March 1954 (aged 75); Port Melbourne, Victoria
- Original team: Warrnambool

Playing career^{1}
Years	Club	Games (Goals)
1901	Carlton	1 (0)
- ^{1} Playing statistics correct to the end of 1901.

Francis Patrick Gomez (17 August 1878 – 17 March 1954) was an Australian rules footballer who played with Carlton in the Victorian Football League (VFL).

His son, Frank Gomez Jr., played for Essendon in the late 1920s.
