= Billy Moxham =

Australian rules footballer and umpire

Personal information
- Full name: William James Moxham
- Born: 21 April 1886; Melbourne, Victoria
- Died: 12 January 1959 (aged 72); South Melbourne, Victoria
- Original team: Port Melbourne Railway United

Playing career^{1}
Years	Club	Games (Goals)
1907–1910	South Melbourne	29 (2)
- ^{1} Playing statistics correct to the end of 1910.

William James Moxham (21 April 1886 – 12 January 1959) was an Australian rules footballer who played with South Melbourne in the Victorian Football League (VFL).

Moxham appeared in two grand finals during his four-season league career, with the first coming in his debut season. South Melbourne lost on that occasion but he was a member of the team which won the 1909 premiership, playing as a wingman.

He later took up umpiring and was a VFL boundary umpire in 25 games from 1913 to 1919.
