= Sutton Peak (Antarctica) =

Mountain in Antarctica

Sutton Peak (79°49′S 82°34′W) is a sharp peak, 1,410 metres (4,630 ft) high, on the ridge separating Henderson Glacier and Ahrnsbrak Glacier in the Enterprise Hills, Heritage Range. It was mapped by the United States Geological Survey from surveys and from U.S. Navy air photos, 1961–66, and named by the Advisory Committee on Antarctic Names for Walter C. Sutton, meteorologist at Little America V Station during 1957.
