= Les Huntington =

Australian rules footballer

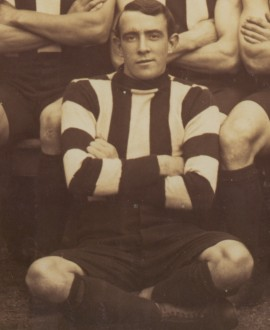
- Huntington in 1914

Personal information
- Full name: Leslie Stuart Huntington
- Born: 14 May 1892; Coburg, Victoria
- Died: 29 October 1968 (aged 76); Corryong, Victoria
- Original team: Coburg
- Height: 180 cm (5 ft 11 in)
- Weight: 75 kg (165 lb)

Playing career^{1}
| Years | Club | Games (Goals) |
| 1914 | Collingwood | 4 (0) |
- ^{1} Playing statistics correct to the end of 1914.

Leslie Stuart Huntington (14 May 1892 – 29 October 1968) was an Australian rules footballer who played with Collingwood in the Victorian Football League (VFL).

He had two brothers, Stan and Jack, who also played VFL football, both playing for Melbourne.
