= Frank Gomez Jr. =

Australian rules footballer (1909–1961)

Personal information
- Full name: Frank Gomez Jr.
- Born: 13 February 1909
- Died: 31 January 1961 (aged 51)

Playing career^{1}
Years	Club	Games (Goals)
1929–32	Essendon	22 (8)
- ^{1} Playing statistics correct to the end of 1932.

Frank Gomez Jr. (13 February 1909 – 31 January 1961) was an Australian rules footballer who played with Essendon in the Victorian Football League (VFL). He also played for Port Melbourne Railway United in the Wednesday Football League (WFL).

His father, Frank Gomez, played one game for Carlton in 1901.
