= Hoinkes Peak =

Mountain in Antarctica

Coordinates: 79°52′S 82°58′W

Hoinkes Peak is a sharp rock peak, 1,840 metres (6,040 ft) high, standing at the head of Henderson Glacier, where it forms part of the west wall of the glacier, in the Heritage Range, Antarctica. It was mapped by the United States Geological Survey from surveys and U.S. Navy air photos from 1961 to 1966, and was named by the Advisory Committee on Antarctic Names for Herfried C. Hoinkes, a meteorologist at Little America V Station in 1957.

== See also ==
- Mountains in Antarctica
