= Port Melbourne Railway United Football Club =

Port Melbourne Railway United
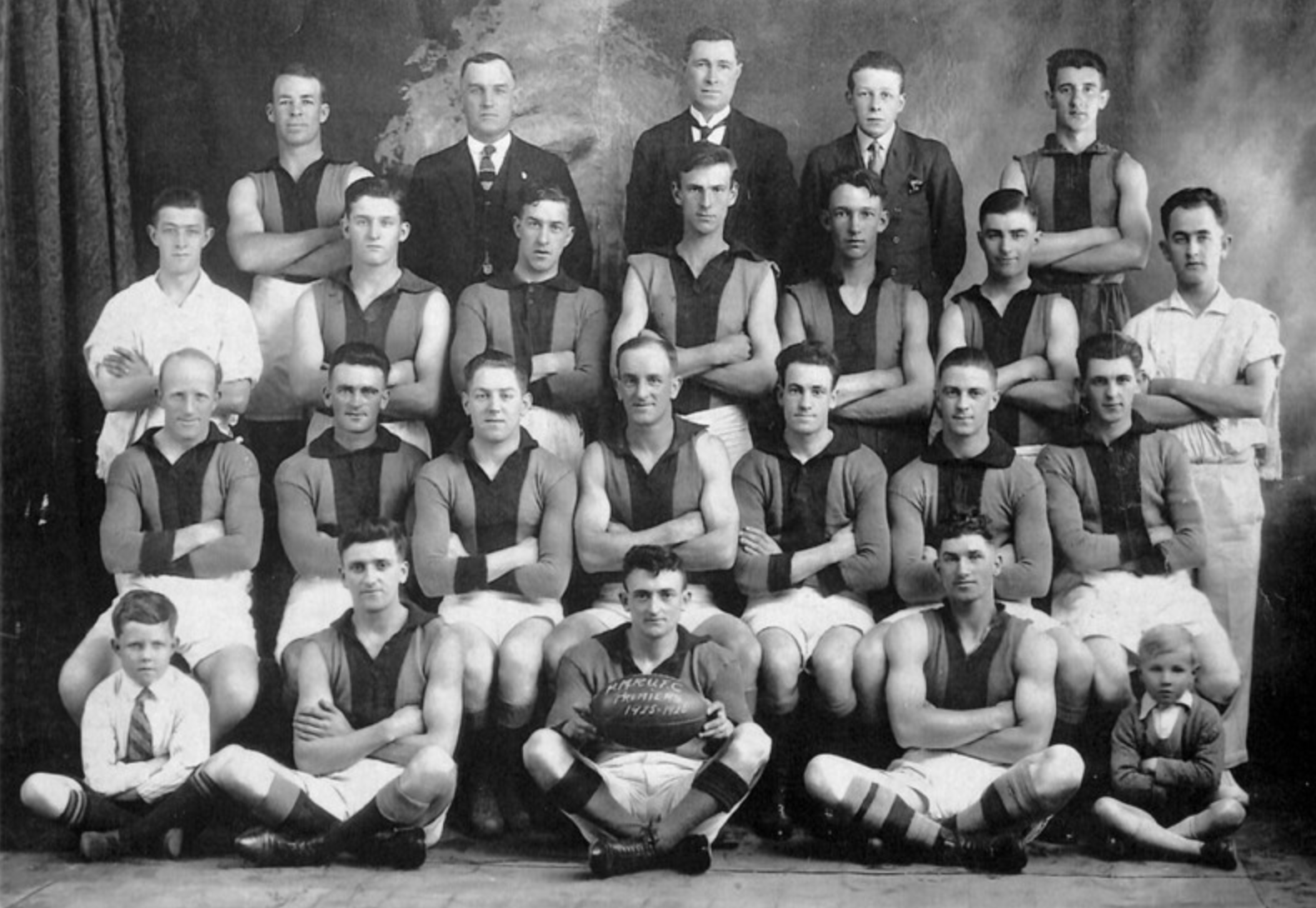

Names
- Full name: Port Melbourne Railway United Football Club
- Former name: Port Melbourne Junior Football Club (c. 1919−c. 1928)
- Nickname(s): Portsmen, Ways

Club details
- Founded: March 1902; 123 years ago
- Dissolved: c. 1939; 87 years ago
- Premierships: VJFA (3): 1910; 1913; 1914
- Ground: Richmond City Reserve

Uniforms
Home

The Port Melbourne Railway United Football Club, also known simply as Railway United or just Railway, was an Australian rules football club based in Port Melbourne.

Railway United was one of the most successful clubs in the Victorian Junior Football Association (VJFA), appearing in seven grand finals between 1910 and 1926. It also had an reserves affiliation with the Port Melbourne Football Club in the mid-1920s.

The club had various rivalries throughout its history, most notably with the Yarraville Football Club, as well as with the Fernside Football Club and Prahran Juniors.

== History ==
=== Early years ===
Port Melbourne Railway United was formed in March 1902 after a meeting at the Prince Arthur Hotel. The club entered the A Section of Fenton and Dinsdale's Suburban 6th rate competition, finishing third at the end of the season. Many of the club's players also worked on the Sandridge railway.

In 1903, Railway United moved to R. Smith's South Suburban 5th rate competition. However, several of the club's best players left shortly before the start of the season. Despite this, the club went onto win its first 5th Rate game with only 16 players, and after gaining more players as the season progressed, went onto win the premiership.

Railway United moved to the Linton 5th rate competition in 1904, going undefeated for the season, and then entered the 3rd rate competition in 1905, although "many thought they were too small for this competition". They were again undefeated for the season, in what The Standard described as "undoubtedly the best team that ever played" in the 3rd rate competition.

The club discussed joining the Victorian Junior Football Association (VJFA) for the 1906 season, but ultimately chose to stay in the 3rd rate competition. Owing to a misunderstanding as to where the first match was to be played, a number of Railway United players did not turn up, and the club was defeated by a point in round 1 (their first defeat in three seasons). Later that year, they won the premiership for the fourth time in a row.

=== VJFA entry ===
In 1907, after a "great deal of discussion", Railway United entered the VJFA with a 1st rate team, playing their home games at Richmond City Reserve. The club finished second on the ladder at the end of the home-and-away season and were widely seen as premiership favourites, but after a disagreement about who would play against Footscray Juniors in the semi-final, players entered the field "very dissatisfied" and a 26-point loss followed.

The 1908 season was a difficult one for Railway United, as they had close losses to Footscray Juniors and Yarraville and just missed out on a place in the finals series. The fifth-placed finish was the club's lowest in its history. They also appeared to have played at least home home game against Port Melbourne Cricket Ground this season.

They returned to the finals series in 1909, but again missed out after a semi-final loss to Yarraville.

=== VJFA success ===
Railway United won its first VJFA premiership in 1910, defeating Yarraville by 25 points. The grand final was again reached in 1911, but Railway United was defeated by Fitzroy Juniors by 38 points.

In 1912, the club was involved in a controversial grand final against Yarraville. Railway United won the match by three points, but Yarraville successfully protested one of Port Melbourne's second quarter goals on the grounds of goal umpire error, and the match was reversed to a three-point Yarraville victory. Although they had the right to challenge, Railway United refused to play as its own act of protest, and was almost banned from the VJFA as a result.

The 1913 and 1914 seasons saw back-to-back premierships for Railway United, with victories over Yarraville and South Melbourne District respectively. The club did not make any grand finals in the following six seasons, possibly because 80 of its players were fighting in World War I (the highest proportion of the total number of players recruited from a VJFA club) and it appears to have been in recess for the 1916 season. Railway United suffered an 11-point loss to Preston in the 1921 grand final.

=== Later years ===
In 1924, the VJFA started to formally become the reserves competition for the Victorian Football Association (VFA). By 1925, Railway United were effectively the reserves team of the VFA's Port Melbourne Football Club, and were referred to in the media as the "Port Melbourne Junior Football Club" (although the Railway United name remained in use locally for many years).

Back-to-back grand final losses against Yarraville came in 1925 and 1926.

In 1928, the VJFA officially became the VFA reserves competition, and Railway United (like all other non-VFA clubs) left the VJFA, joining the Metropolitan Junior Football Association (MJFA).

Exactly what happened with the club in the next decade is unclear. Records show it was still active in the 1930s, with Port Melbourne playing at least one practice game against Railway United ahead of the 1930 VFA season.

It appears the club may have played in the Wednesday Football League (WFL), a mid-week workplace competition that disbanded in the mid-1930s. A club known as "Railways" was known to have competed in the 1920s and 1930s as one of the strongest clubs in the competition, but that included seasons where Port Melbourne Railway United was in the VJFA.

Port Melbourne Railway United still existed in 1938, but no records can be found after this time. It is possible the club dissolved because of the impacts of World War II.

== Honours ==
=== Season records ===
At the end of the 1910 VJFA season, Railway United had an all-time winning record of 84.97%.

Played	Won	Lost	Drawn	GF/BF	TF	GA/BA	TA
173	147	24	2	832.1299	6291	391.609	2955

== Seasons ==
Premiers	Grand Finalist	Minor premiers	Finals appearance	Wooden spoon

Year	League	Division	Finish	W	L	D	Coach	Captain	Best and fairest	Leading goalkicker		Ref
1902	6th rate		3rd									
1903	5th rate		1st									
1904	5th rate		1st		0							
1905	3rd rate		1st		0							
1906	3rd rate		1st									
1907	VJFA		2nd	13	4	1						
1908	VJFA		5th	10	8	0						
1909	VJFA		2nd	13	4	1						
1910	VJFA		1st	15	1	0		A. Hair				
1911	VJFA		2nd	13	5	0			J. Menzies			
1912	VJFA		1st									
1913	VJFA		1st	16	1	0				Moloney	45	
1914	VJFA		1st	11	3	0						
1915	VJFA		5th	11	7	0		W. Critch				
1916	VJFA		(In recess due to World War I)									
1917	VJFA		7th	6	12	0						
1918	VJFA		6th	7	9	0						
1919	VJFA		4th	8	7	0						
1920	VJFA		5th									
1921	VJFA		2nd	13	4	0						
1922	VJFA		6th	10	8	0						
1923	VJFA		8th	7	11	1						
1924	VJFA	VFA Section	5th	10	6	0						
1925	VJFA	VFA Section	(Note: In 1925, Railway United finished in an unknown position in the VFA Section and were runners-up in the VJFA Section grand final.)									
1926	VJFA	VFA Section	1st (Note: In 1926, Railway United finished 1st in the VFA Section but were runners-up in the VJFA Section grand final.)									
1927	VJFA	VFA Section										
1928	MJFA											
1929												
1930												
1931												
1932												
1933												
1934												
1935												
1936												
1937												
1938												

== VFL players ==
A number of Railway United players also played in the Victorian Football League (VFL), which is known today as the Australian Football League (AFL).

- William Angwin − Melbourne, St Kilda
- Harry Brereton − Melbourne
- Frank Gomez Jr. − Essendon
- Mal Lowrie − South Melbourne
- George McDonald − St Kilda
- Billy Moxham − South Melbourne
- Clarrie Roberts − St Kilda
- Jack Robertson − Melbourne
- Claude Thomas − South Melbourne
