= Enterprise Hills =

Group of hills and peaks in the Ellsworth Mountains, Antarctica

Coordinates: 79°55′S 82°0′W

The Enterprise Hills are a prominent group of largely ice-free hills and peaks in the form of an arc. The feature extends for about 30 nautical miles (60 km) to form the north and northeast boundary of Horseshoe Valley in the Heritage Range of the Ellsworth Mountains. These hills were mapped by the United States Geological Survey from surveys and U.S. Navy air photos, 1961–66; the name was applied by the Advisory Committee on Antarctic Names in association with the name Heritage Range.

== Features ==
Geographical features include:

- Ahrnsbrak Glacier
- Bell Valley
- Chappell Peak
- Connell Canyon
- Guarcello Peak
- Henderson Glacier
- Horseshoe Valley
- Mount Dolence
- Mount Rossman
- Parrish Peak
- Plummer Glacier
- Rhodes Bluff
- Schoeck Peak
- Seal Glacier
- Shoemaker Peak
- Strong Peak
- Sutton Peak
- Union Glacier
- Urban Point
