= Liberty Hills (Antarctica) =

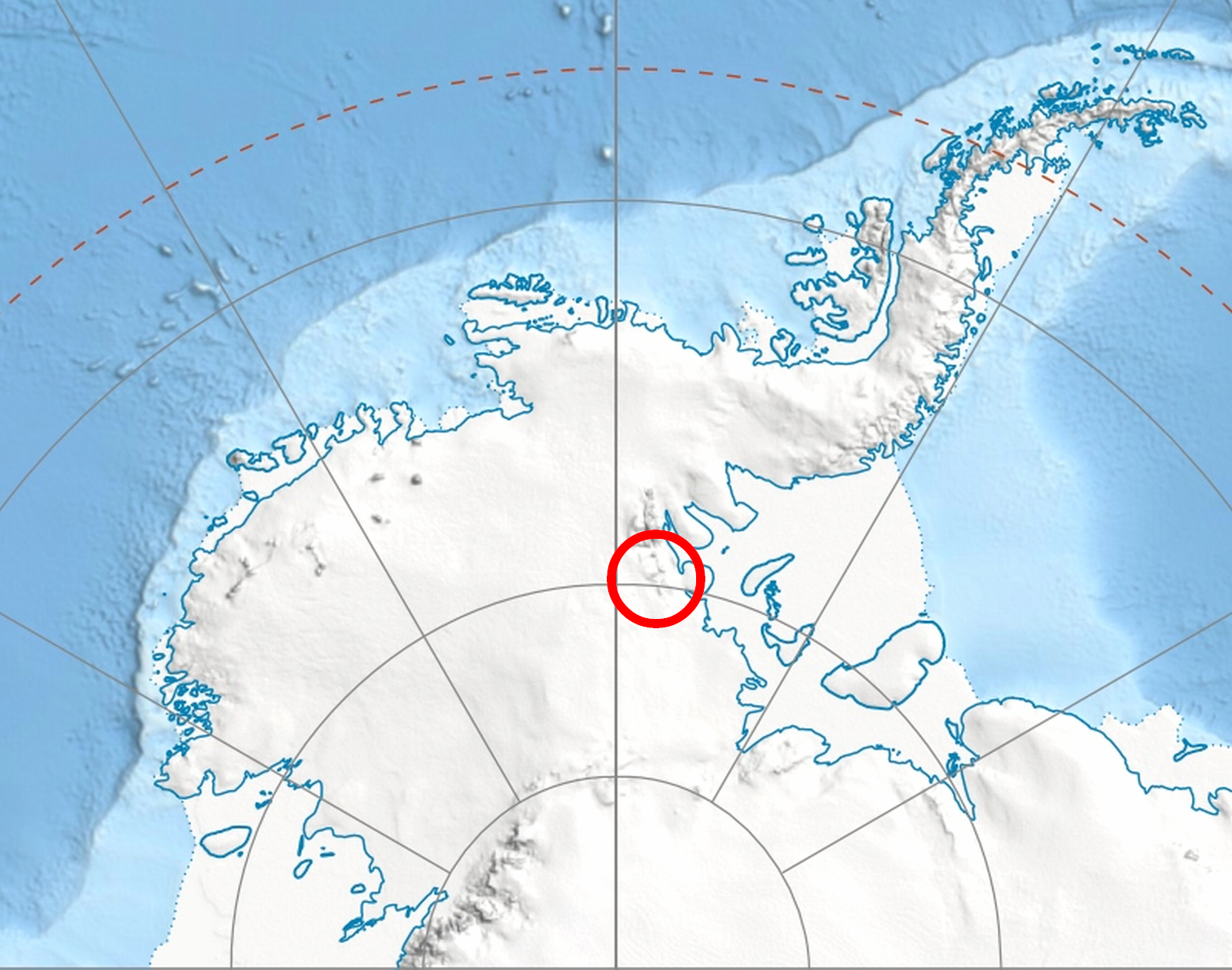
Location of Heritage Range in West Antarctica.

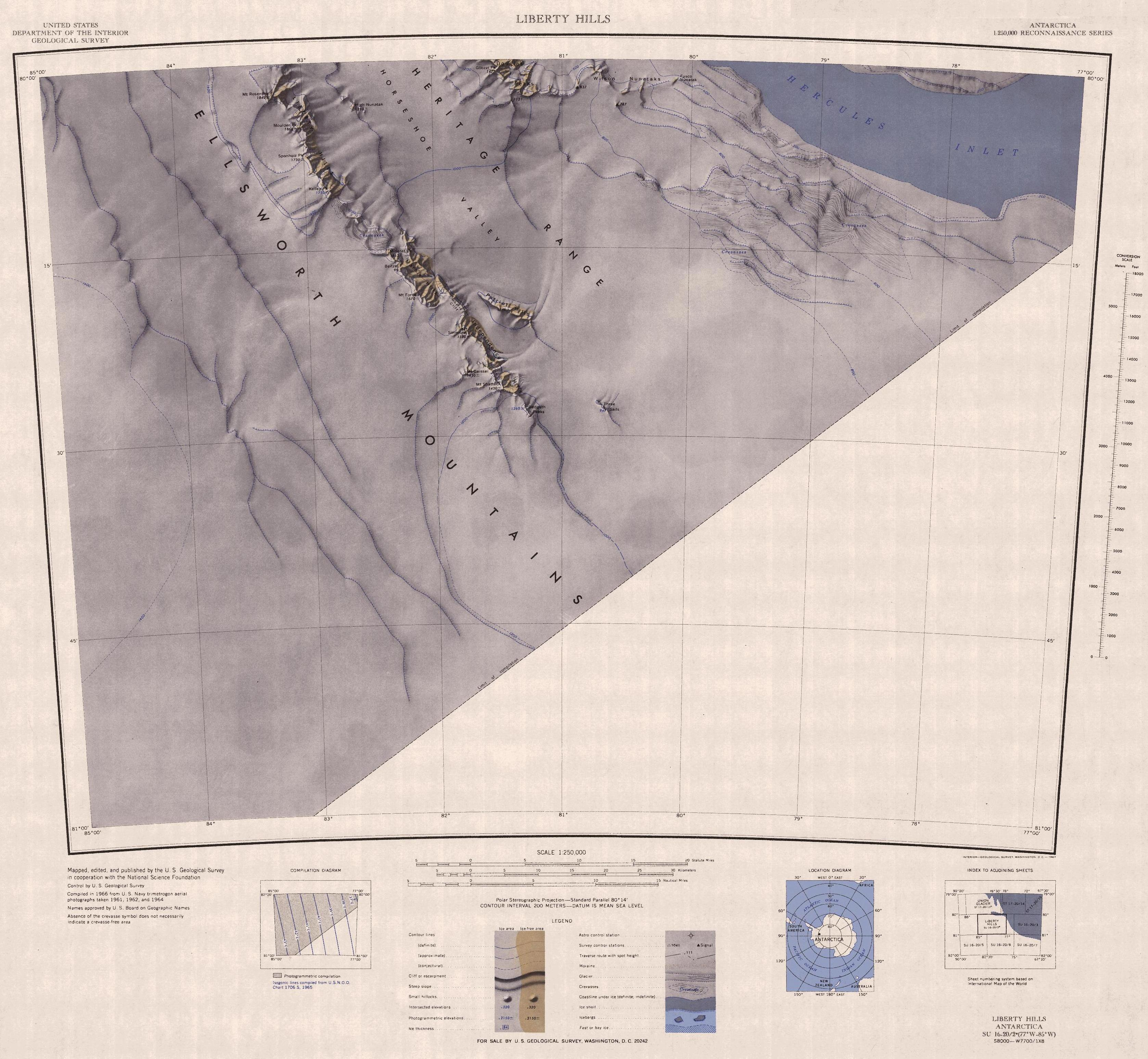
Map of southern Heritage Range featuring Liberty Hills

The Liberty Hills (80°6′S 82°58′W) are a line of rugged hills and peaks with bare rock eastern slopes, about 10 nautical miles (19 km) long, standing 7 nautical miles (13 km) northwest of the Marble Hills and forming part of the west wall of Horseshoe Valley, in the Heritage Range, Ellsworth Mountains, Antarctica. The Liberty Hills were mapped by the United States Geological Survey from ground surveys and U.S. Navy air photos, 1961–66. The name was applied by the Advisory Committee on Antarctic Names in association with the name Heritage Range. The remarkable High Nunatak towers east of the Hills.

== Maps ==
- Liberty Hills. Scale 1:250 000 topographic map. Reston, Virginia: US Geological Survey, 1966.
- Antarctic Digital Database (ADD). Scale 1:250000 topographic map of Antarctica. Scientific Committee on Antarctic Research (SCAR). Since 1993, regularly updated.

== Features ==
Geographical features include:

- Horseshoe Valley
- Kelley Peak
- Moulder Peak
- Mount Rosenthal
- Sponholz Peak
