= Henderson Glacier =

Glacier in Antarctica

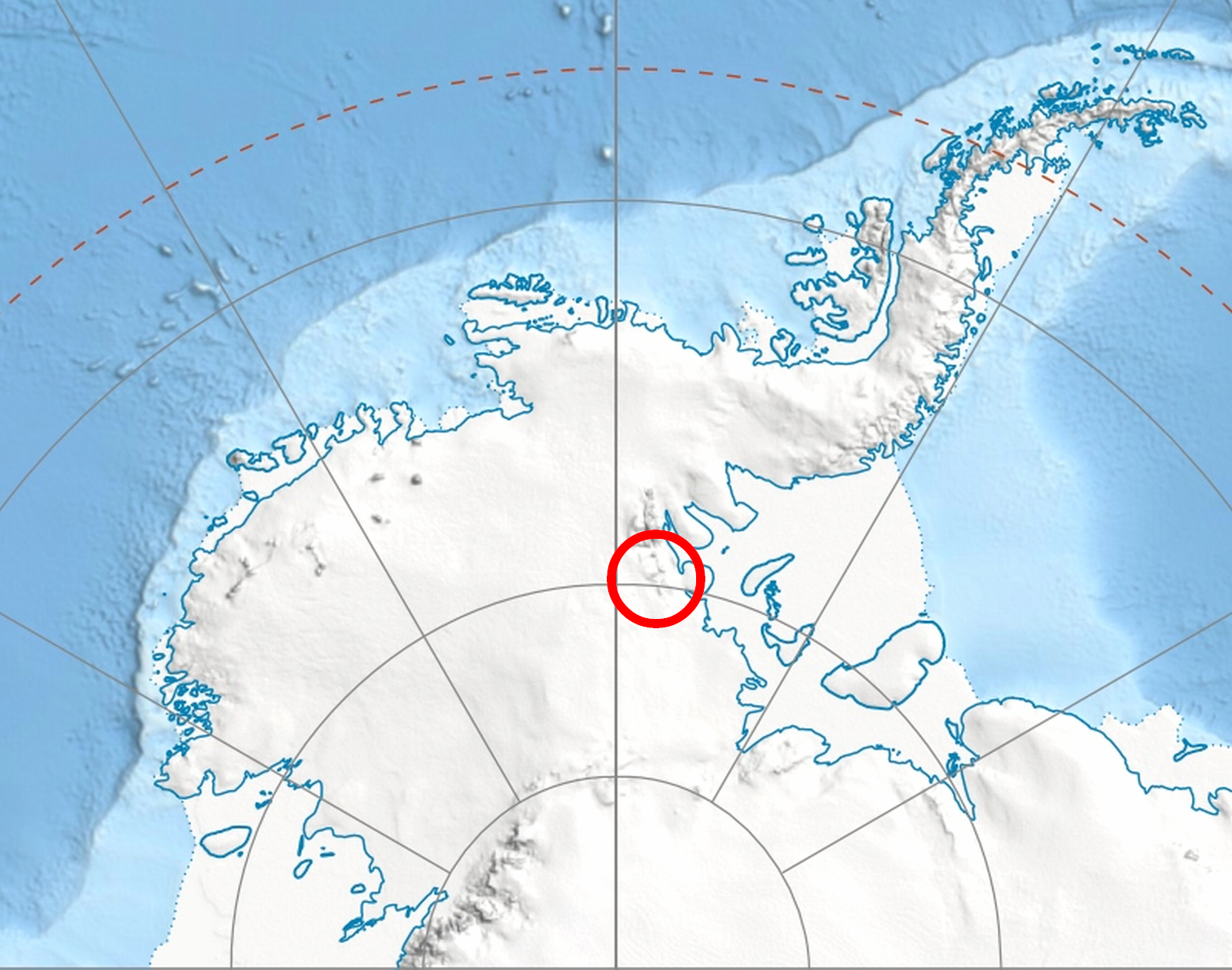
- Location of Heritage Range in Western Antarctica

- Location within Antarctica
- Type: tributary
- Location: Ellsworth Land
- Coordinates: 79°47′00″S 82°25′00″W
- Length: 7 nautical miles (13 km; 8.1 mi)
- Thickness: unknown
- Terminus: Union Glacier
- Status: unknown

Henderson Glacier is a glacier approximately 7 nautical miles (13 km; 8.1 mi) long in the Enterprise Hills of the Heritage Range, Antarctica. It flows northeast from Schoeck Peak and Hoinkes Peak to enter Union Glacier just east of Mount Rossman. Henderson Glacier was mapped by the United States Geological Survey from surveys and U.S. Navy air photos 1961–66, and was named by the Advisory Committee on Antarctic Names for Felix E. Henderson, a United States Antarctic Research Program meteorologist at Eights Station in 1965.

== See also ==
- List of glaciers in the Antarctic
- Glaciology
