= Independence Hills =

Coordinates: 80°25′S 81°33′W

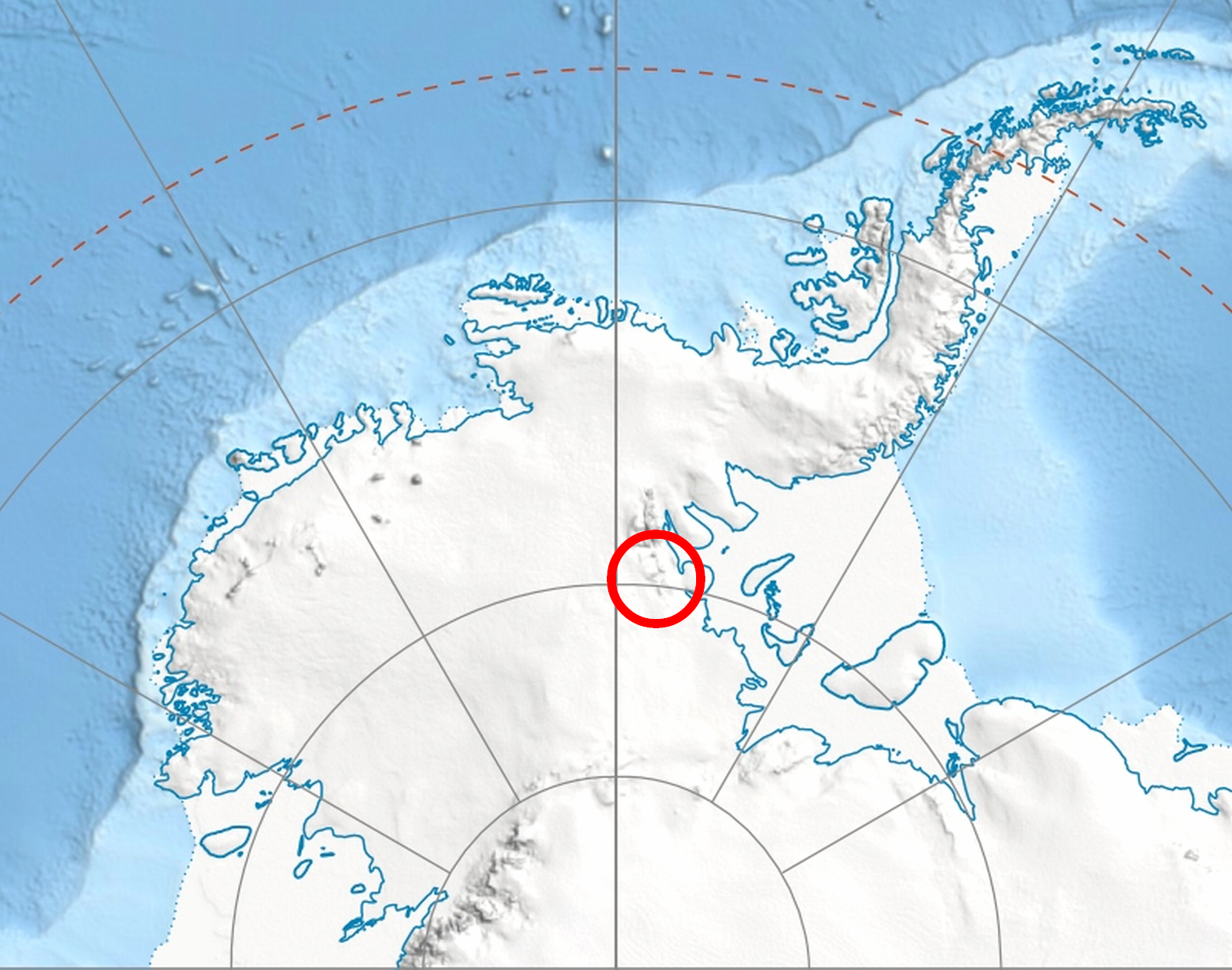
Location of Heritage Range in Western Antarctica.

The Independence Hills are a line of rugged hills and peaks, 10 miles (16 km) long, with mainly bare rock eastern slopes. They lie 3 miles (5 km) southeast of the Marble Hills and form the southern segment of the west wall of Horseshoe Valley, in the Heritage Range of Antarctica. The Independence Hills were mapped by the United States Geological Survey from ground surveys and U.S. Navy air photos, 1961–66. The name was applied by the Advisory Committee on Antarctic Names in association with the name "Heritage Range".

== Features ==
Geographical features include:

- Marble Hills
- Horseshoe Valley
- Morris Cliff
- Mount Geissel
- Mount Shattuck
- Mount Simmons
- Patriot Hills
- Redpath Peaks
