= George McDonald (Australian footballer) =

Australian rules footballer

Personal information
- Full name: George Alexander McDonald
- Born: 22 February 1893; Yarraville, Victoria
- Died: 18 April 1968 (aged 75); Footscray, Victoria
- Original team: Port Melbourne Railway United

Playing career^{1}
Years	Club	Games (Goals)
1914	St Kilda	1 (1)
- ^{1} Playing statistics correct to the end of 1914.

George Alexander McDonald (22 February 1893 – 18 April 1968) was an Australian rules footballer who played with St Kilda in the Victorian Football League (VFL).
