= Parrish Peak =

Mountain in Ellsworth Land, Antarctica

Parrish Peak (79°55′S 82°1′W) is a very pointed, partly snow-topped peak, 1,775 m, surmounting the ridge next south of Seal Glacier in the Enterprise Hills, Heritage Range. It was mapped by the United States Geological Survey (USGS) from surveys and U.S. Navy air photos from 1961 to 1966. It was named by the Advisory Committee on Antarctic Names (US-ACAN) for Edward N. Parrish, a glaciologist on the United States Antarctic Research Program (USARP) South Pole—Queen Maud Land Traverse I and II, 1964–65 and 1965–66.

== See also ==
- Mountains in Antarctica
