= Steve Gill (footballer) =

Australian rules footballer

Personal information
- Full name: Stephen Alphonsus Gill
- Born: 2 August 1896; St Kilda, Victoria
- Died: 6 June 1977 (aged 80); Sandringham, Victoria
- Original team: St Kilda District

Playing career^{1}
Years	Club	Games (Goals)
1920	St Kilda	2 (0)
- ^{1} Playing statistics correct to the end of 1920.

Stephen Alphonsus Gill (2 August 1896 – 6 June 1977) was an Australian rules footballer who played with St Kilda in the Victorian Football League (VFL).
