= Mount Simmons =

Mountain in Ellsworth Land, Antarctica

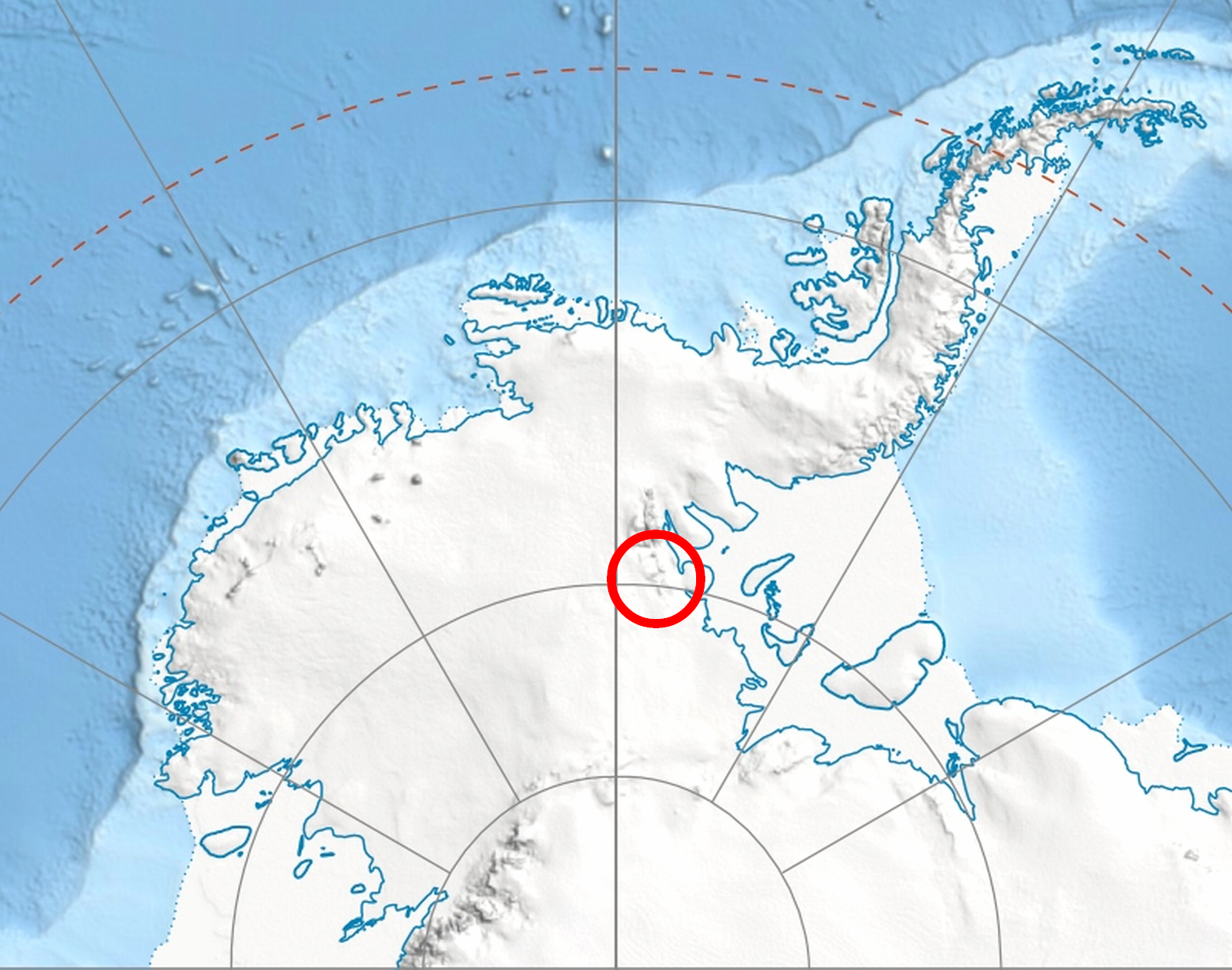
Location of Heritage Range in Western Antarctica.

Mount Simmons (80°22′S 81°45′W) is a mountain, 1,590 m, forming the north end of the Independence Hills, in the Heritage Range. It was named by the Advisory Committee on Antarctic Names (US-ACAN) for aviation electronics technician Richard S. Simmons, U.S. Navy, an air crewman on LC-47 aircraft who perished in a crash on the Ross Ice Shelf on February 2, 1966.
