= Algy Sharp =

Australian rules footballer

Personal information
- Full name: Arnold Alfred Gordon Sharp
- Born: 30 June 1889; Ringarooma, Tasmania
- Died: 29 April 1967 (aged 77); Scottsdale, Tasmania
- Original team: Devonport

Playing career^{1}
Years	Club	Games (Goals)
1914–1915	St Kilda	21 (29)
- ^{1} Playing statistics correct to the end of 1915.

Arnold Alfred Gordon Sharp (30 June 1889 – 29 April 1967) was an Australian rules footballer who played for the St Kilda Football Club in the Victorian Football League (VFL).
