= Claude Thomas (footballer) =

Australian rules footballer

Personal information
- Full name: Claude Edison Thomas
- Born: 15 April 1891; Gisborne, Victoria
- Died: 5 July 1918 (aged 27); Hamel, France
- Original team: Port Melbourne Railway United
- Height: 173 cm (5 ft 8 in)
- Weight: 70 kg (154 lb)

Playing career^{1}
Years	Club	Games (Goals)
1914–15	South Melbourne	13 (0)
- ^{1} Playing statistics correct to the end of 1915.

Claude Edison Thomas (15 April 1891 – 5 July 1918) was an Australian rules footballer who played with South Melbourne in the Victorian Football League. He was killed in action during World War I.

== Family ==
One of children of William Edward Paul Thomas (1851-1918), and Louisa Thomas (1855-1925), née Williams, Claude Edison Thomas was born at Gisborne, Victoria on 15 April 1891.

== Education ==
He was educated at All Saints' Grammar School, in East St Kilda.

== Football ==
Recruited from prominent junior club Port Melbourne Railway United, Thomas played on the wing.

He played in thirteen home-and-away games (i.e., no Finals) over two seasons – the first, replacing George Bower, was against Fitzroy, at the Brunswick Street Oval, on 9 May 1914 – coming in and out of the South Melbourne team on multiple occasions during the two seasons. His football career ended when he enlisted in the First AIF.

== Military service ==
Employed as a fireman with the Victorian Railways, he enlisted in the First AIF on 24 August 1915 and departed from Melbourne aboard HMAT Kabinga (A58) on 8 May 1916. Although given the rank of Driver, he reverted to the rank of Private in May 1918 at his own request in order to serve in the same battalion as his older brother.

Two of his brothers also served in the First AIF: Rupert Clarence Thomas (1893-1918), and Vere Stanley Thomas (1895-1975). Serving in the same unit as Claude, Rupert Clarence Thomas was killed in action, in France. on 8 August 1918, five weeks after Claude's death.

== Death ==
On 5 July 1918, Thomas was lying in a trench near Vaire Wood, during the Battle of Hamel when a piece of shrapnel from a German shell glanced off the parapet and struck his ammunition pouch, "the contents of which exploded and blew a hole right through him, killing him instantly".

He was eventually buried at the Villers-Bretonneux Military Cemetery.

== See also ==
- List of Victorian Football League players who died on active service
