= Herb Joolen =

Australian rules footballer

Personal information
- Full name: Herbert William van Joolen
- Born: 27 August 1890; Port Melbourne, Victoria
- Died: 7 September 1967 (aged 77); Murrumbeena, Victoria
- Height: 178 cm (5 ft 10 in)
- Weight: 67 kg (148 lb)

Playing career^{1}
Years	Club	Games (Goals)
1912–13	Melbourne	16 (11)
1914	South Melbourne	1 (1)
Total		17 (12)
- ^{1} Playing statistics correct to the end of 1914.

Herb Joolen (27 August 1890 – 7 September 1967) was an Australian rules footballer who played with Melbourne and South Melbourne in the Victorian Football League (VFL).
