= Schoeck Peak =

Mountain in Antarctica

Coordinates: 79°53′S 82°51′W

Schoeck Peak is a peak of 1,810 metres (5,940 ft) standing directly at the head of Henderson Glacier in the Enterprise Hills, Heritage Range in Antarctica. It was mapped by the United States Geological Survey (USGS) from surveys and U.S. Navy air photos from 1961 to 1966. It was named by the Advisory Committee on Antarctic Names (US-ACAN) for Peter A. Schoeck, an auroral scientist at Little America V Station in 1957.
