= Tom Pollard (footballer) =

Australian rules footballer

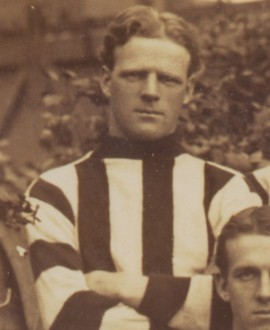
- Pollard in 1914

Personal information
- Full name: Thomas Charles Pollard
- Born: 7 July 1894; Hay, New South Wales
- Died: 10 May 1941 (aged 46); Hamilton, New South Wales
- Original team: Melbourne City
- Height: 177 cm (5 ft 10 in)
- Weight: 72 kg (159 lb)

Playing career^{1}
Years	Club	Games (Goals)
1914	Collingwood	6 (2)
1915	Essendon	8 (5)
Total		14 (7)
- ^{1} Playing statistics correct to the end of 1915.

Thomas Charles Pollard (7 July 1894 – 10 May 1941) was an Australian rules footballer who played with Collingwood and Essendon in the Victorian Football League (VFL).

== Family ==
He married Marion Isabel Douglas on 25 June 1917.

== Death ==
He died at Hamilton, New South Wales on 10 May 1941.
