= Vern Couttie =

Australian rules footballer

Personal information
- Full name: Vernon John Gordon Couttie
- Born: 7 May 1891; Ballarat East, Victoria
- Died: 12 August 1967 (aged 76); Oakleigh South, Victoria
- Original team: Port Melbourne Railways United

Playing career^{1}
Years	Club	Games (Goals)
1914	St Kilda	1 (1)
- ^{1} Playing statistics correct to the end of 1914.

Vernon John Gordon Couttie (7 May 1891 – 12 August 1967) was an Australian rules footballer who played with St Kilda in the Victorian Football League (VFL).
