= Percy Colee =

Australian rules footballer

Personal information
- Full name: Percival Wesley Colee
- Born: 11 November 1892; Coburg, Victoria
- Died: 4 September 1944 (aged 51); South Melbourne, Victoria
- Original team: Coburg

Playing career^{1}
Years	Club	Games (Goals)
1914	Melbourne	5 (3)
- ^{1} Playing statistics correct to the end of 1914.

Percival Wesley Colee (11 November 1892 – 4 September 1944) was an Australian rules footballer who played with Melbourne in the Victorian Football League (VFL).
