= Basil Nehill =

Australian rules footballer

Personal information
- Full name: John Basil Nehill
- Born: 10 June 1891; Terang, Victoria
- Died: 5 March 1942 (aged 50); Brighton East, Victoria
- Original team: South Ballarat

Playing career^{1}
Years	Club	Games (Goals)
1912	St Kilda	13 (2)
1914	Essendon	2 (0)
Total		15 (2)
- ^{1} Playing statistics correct to the end of 1914.

Basil Nehill (10 June 1891 – 5 March 1942) was an Australian rules footballer who played for the St Kilda Football Club and Essendon Football Club in the Victorian Football League (VFL).
