= Harry Britter =

Australian rules footballer

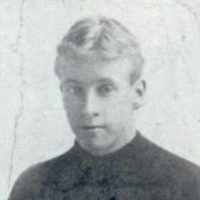
- Picture of Henry Britter in football uniform

Personal information
- Full name: Henry James Britter
- Born: 23 June 1891; Geelong, Victoria
- Died: 5 February 1954 (aged 62); Geelong, Victoria
- Original team: Chilwell
- Height: 180 cm (5 ft 11 in)
- Weight: 79 kg (174 lb)

Playing career^{1}
Years	Club	Games (Goals)
1914	Melbourne	5 (5)
1924	Geelong	1 (0)
Total		6 (5)
- ^{1} Playing statistics correct to the end of 1924.

Harry James Britter (23 June 1891 – 5 February 1954) was an Australian rules footballer who played with Melbourne and Geelong in the Victorian Football League (VFL). He served in the Australian Imperial Force in World War I, enlisting in July 1915.
