= Roy Farmer (footballer) =

Australian rules footballer

Personal information
- Full name: Robert Roy Farmer
- Born: 7 December 1892; Mirboo North, Victoria
- Died: 1 April 1951 (aged 58); Dumbalk, Victoria
- Original team: Queen's College / Mirboo North
- Height: 182 cm (6 ft 0 in)
- Weight: 86 kg (190 lb)

Playing career^{1}
Years	Club	Games (Goals)
1914	St Kilda	8 (2)
- ^{1} Playing statistics correct to the end of 1914.

Robert Roy Farmer (7 December 1892 – 1 April 1951) was an Australian rules footballer who played with St Kilda in the Victorian Football League (VFL).
