= Percy Jackson (footballer, born 1894) =

Australian rules footballer (1894–1959)

Personal information
- Born: 1 April 1894
- Died: 29 March 1959 (aged 64)
- Original team: Port Melbourne Juniors
- Height: 168 cm (5 ft 6 in)
- Weight: 64 kg (141 lb)

Playing career^{1}
Years	Club	Games (Goals)
1914	South Melbourne	8 (5)
1915	St Kilda	7 (3)
1918	Carlton	1 (1)
Total		16 (9)
- ^{1} Playing statistics correct to the end of 1918.

Percy Jackson (1 April 1894 – 29 March 1959) was an Australian rules footballer who played with South Melbourne, St Kilda and Carlton in the Victorian Football League (VFL). His year of death has also been given as 1945.
