= Mount Rosenthal =

Mountain in Ellsworth Land, Antarctica

Mount Rosenthal (80°3′S 83°15′W) is a prominent mountain, 1,840 metres (6,040 ft) in height, at the north end of Liberty Hills, in the Heritage Range, Ellsworth Mountains in Antarctica. Named by Advisory Committee on Antarctic Names (US-ACAN) for Lieutenant Commander Ronald Rosenthal, U.S. Navy, navigator on LC-47 aircraft, who perished in a crash on the Ross Ice Shelf on February 2, 1966.

== See also ==
- Mountains in Antarctica
