= Plummer Glacier =

Glacier in Antarctica

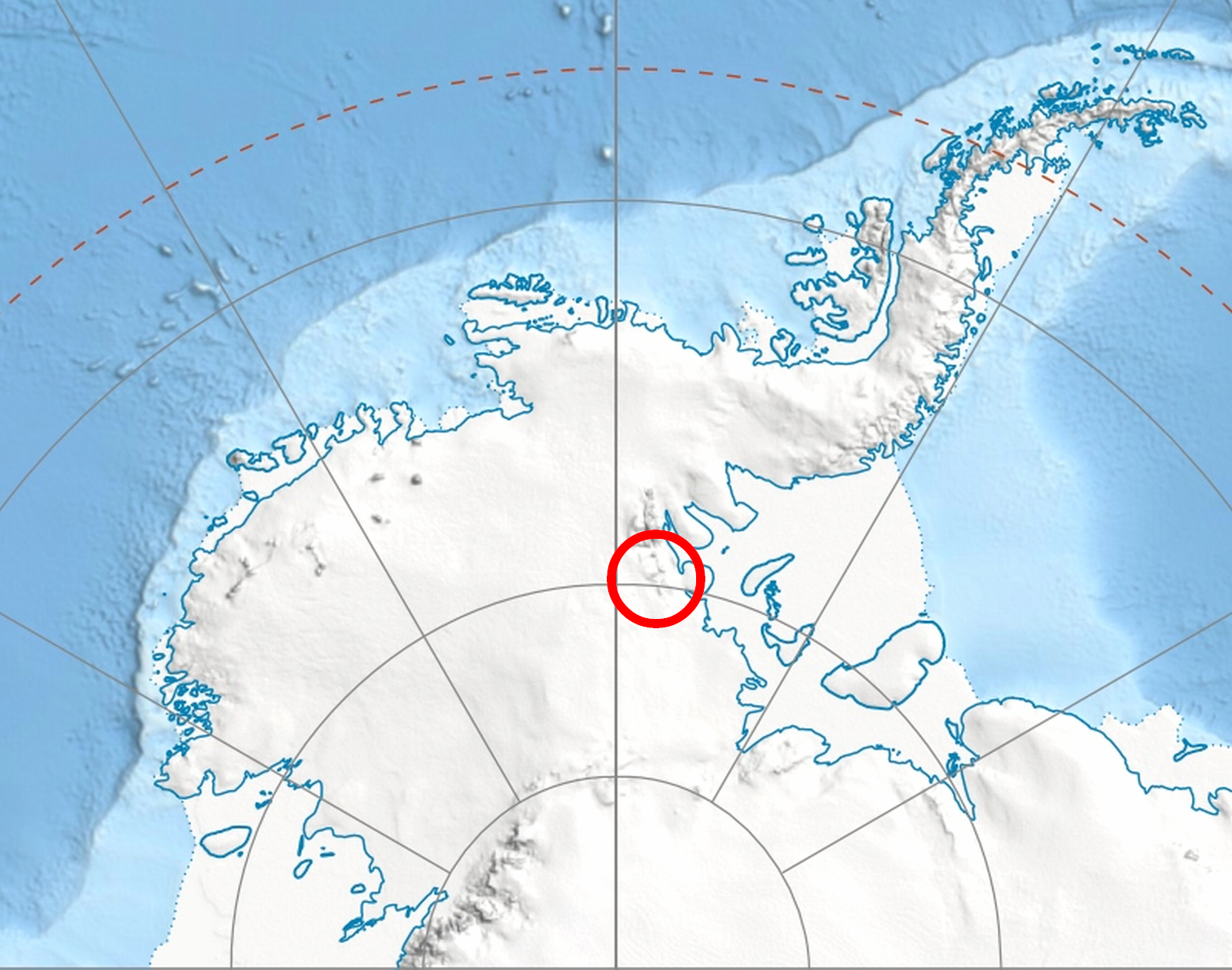
- Location of Heritage Range in Western Antarctica

- Location within Antarctica
- Location: Ellsworth Land
- Coordinates: 79°58′00″S 81°30′00″W
- Thickness: unknown
- Terminus: Heritage Range
- Status: unknown

Plummer Glacier (79°58′S 81°30′W) is a short glacier descending east through the Enterprise Hills to the north of Lippert Peak and the Douglas Peaks, in the Heritage Range in Antarctica. Mapped by United States Geological Survey (USGS) from surveys and U.S. Navy air photos, 1961–66. Named by Advisory Committee on Antarctic Names (US-ACAN) for Charles C. Plummer, United States Antarctic Research Program (USARP) glaciologist at Palmer Station in 1965.

== See also ==
- List of glaciers in the Antarctic
- Glaciology
