= Ahrnsbrak Glacier =

Glacier in Antarctica

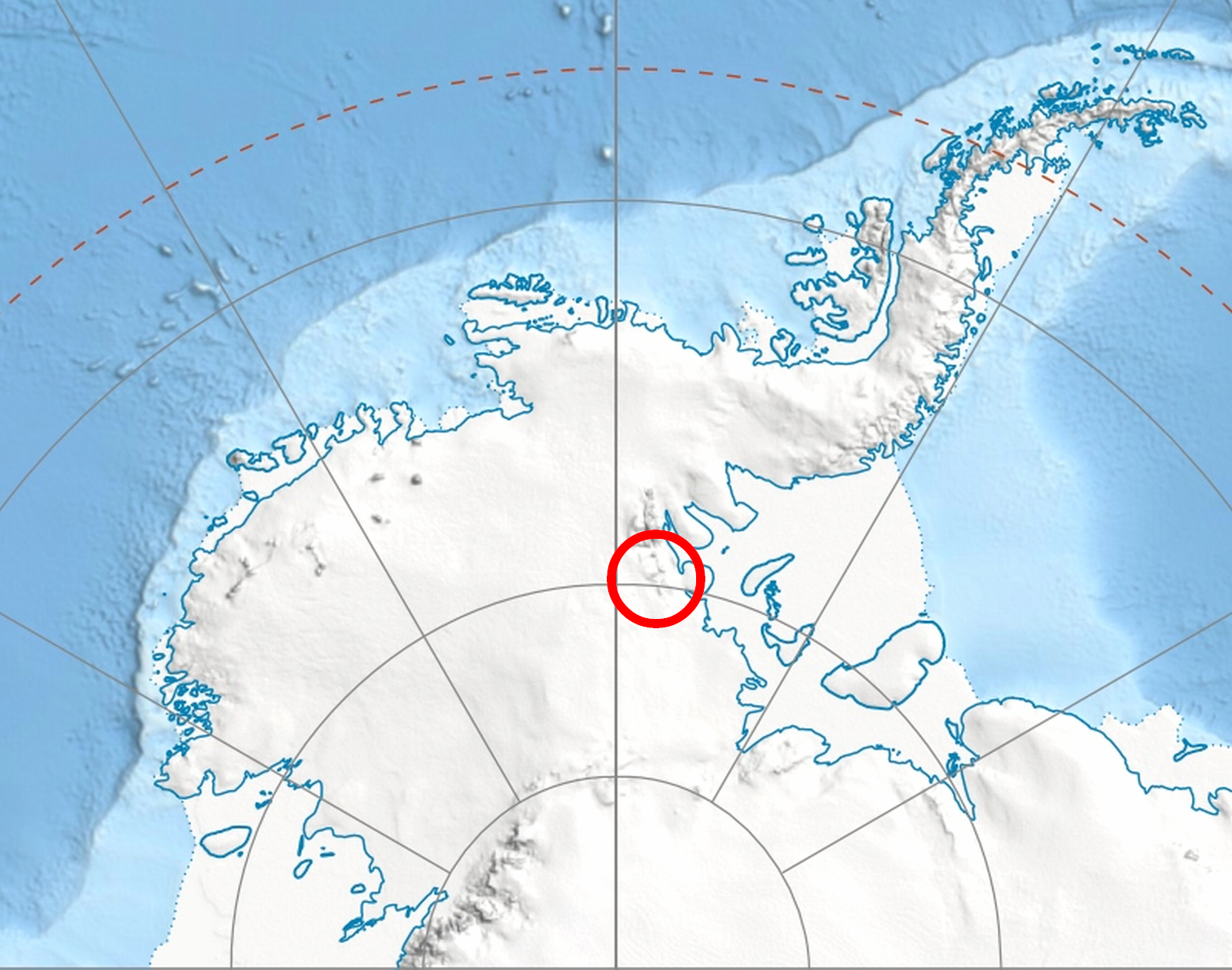
- Location of Heritage Range in Western Antarctica

- Location within Antarctica
- Location: Heritage Range
- Coordinates: 79°48′S 82°18′W
- Thickness: unknown
- Terminus: Union Glacier
- Status: unknown

Ahrnsbrak Glacier is a glacier in the Enterprise Hills of the Heritage Range in Antarctica, flowing north between Sutton Peak and Shoemaker Peak to the confluent ice at the lower end of Union Glacier. It was mapped by the United States Geological Survey from surveys and U.S. Navy air photos, 1961–66, and was named by the Advisory Committee on Antarctic Names for William F. Ahrnsbrak of the United States Antarctic Research Program, a glaciologist at Palmer Station in 1965.

== See also ==
- List of glaciers in the Antarctic
- Glaciology
