= Wal Riddington =

Australian rules footballer

Personal information
- Full name: Walter Ward Riddington
- Born: 1 October 1893; Yackandandah, Victoria
- Died: 15 July 1954 (aged 60); Yackandandah, Victoria
- Original team: Maryborough

Playing career^{1}
Years	Club	Games (Goals)
1914	Melbourne	1 (0)
- ^{1} Playing statistics correct to the end of 1914.

Walter Ward Riddington (1 October 1893 – 15 July 1954) was an Australian rules footballer who played with Melbourne in the Victorian Football League (VFL).
