= Mount Fordell =

Mountain in Ellsworth Land, Antarctica

Coordinates: 80°19′S 82°9′W

Mount Fordell is a 1,670 metres (5,480 ft) high mountain, marking the south end of the Marble Hills in the Heritage Range, Antarctica. It was named by the Advisory Committee on Antarctic Names for Lieutenant William D. Fordell, U.S. Navy, a co-pilot of LC-47 aircraft, who died in a plane crash on the Ross Ice Shelf on February 2, 1966.

== See also ==
- Mountains in Antarctica
