= Minaret Peak =

Mountain in Ellsworth Land, Antarctica

Coordinates: 80°15′S 82°22′W

Minaret Peak is a rock peak at the northwest end of the Marble Hills in the Heritage Range, Ellsworth Mountains, Antarctica. It was named by the University of Minnesota Ellsworth Mountains Party of 1962–63 because it resembles a minaret.

== See also ==
- Mountains in Antarctica
