= George McLear =

Australian rules footballer

Personal information
- Full name: George McLear
- Born: 21 August 1891; Dromana, Victoria
- Died: 26 March 1950 (aged 58); Bundoora, Victoria

Playing career^{1}
Years	Club	Games (Goals)
1914	Richmond	3 (0)
- ^{1} Playing statistics correct to the end of 1914.

George McLear (21 August 1891 – 26 March 1950) was an Australian rules footballer who played with Richmond in the Victorian Football League (VFL).
