= Bill Moulden =

Australian rules footballer

Personal information
- Full name: William John Moulden
- Born: 30 June 1889; Colac, Victoria
- Died: 26 June 1977 (aged 87); Birregurra, Victoria
- Original team: Chilwell Football Club

Playing career^{1}
Years	Club	Games (Goals)
1914, 1917–20	Geelong	34 (2)
- ^{1} Playing statistics correct to the end of 1920.

William John Moulden (30 June 1889 – 26 June 1977) was an Australian rules footballer who played with Geelong in the Victorian Football League (VFL).

== Family ==
The son of William Frederick Moulden (1857–1892), and Alice Moulden (1866–1959) née Le Batt (later, Mrs. Thomas Alfred Reed), William John Moulden was born at Colac, Victoria on 30 June 1889.

He married Florence Edith Brown (1895–1920) in 1918.

== Football ==
Recruited from the Chilwell Football Club in the Geelong and District Junior Football Association,

He retired at the end of 1920, having played in the last five home-and-away matches of the season, due to "injured knees".

== Death ==
He died at Birregurra, Victoria on 26 June 1977.
