= Orm Fowler =

Australian rules footballer

Personal information
- Full name: Thomas Ormer Fowler
- Born: 4 December 1891; Euroa, Victoria
- Died: 25 July 1963 (aged 71); Chelsea, Victoria
- Original team: Fitzroy juniors
- Height: 173 cm (5 ft 8 in)
- Position: Forward

Playing career^{1}
Years	Club	Games (Goals)
1913	Fitzroy	1 (0)
1914–15	St Kilda	9 (11)
Total		10 (11)
- ^{1} Playing statistics correct to the end of 1915.

Thomas Ormer Fowler (4 December 1891 – 25 July 1963) was an Australian rules footballer who played with Fitzroy and St Kilda in the Victorian Football League (VFL).
