= Clarrie Roberts =

Australian rules footballer

Personal information
- Full name: Clarence Richard Roberts
- Born: 4 November 1888; Inglewood, Victoria
- Died: 18 September 1966 (aged 77); Glen Iris, Victoria
- Original team: Port Melbourne Railway United

Playing career^{1}
Years	Club	Games (Goals)
1914	St Kilda	1 (0)
- ^{1} Playing statistics correct to the end of 1914.

Clarence Richard Roberts (4 November 1888 – 18 September 1966) was an Australian rules footballer who played with St Kilda in the Victorian Football League (VFL).
