= Gordon Burleigh =

Australian rules footballer

Personal information
- Full name: Gordon Anderson Burleigh
- Born: 24 March 1889; Nirranda, Victoria
- Died: 7 July 1956 (aged 66); Mepunga West, Victoria
- Original team: Warrnambool

Playing career^{1}
Years	Club	Games (Goals)
1914	Geelong	1 (1)
- ^{1} Playing statistics correct to the end of 1914.

Gordon Anderson Burleigh (24 March 1889 — 7 July 1956) was an Australian rules footballer who played for Geelong in the Victorian Football League (now known as the Australian Football League).
