= Stan Brady =

Australian rules footballer

Personal information
- Full name: Stanley Edward Brady
- Born: 20 April 1887; Dunkeld, Victoria
- Died: 20 June 1921 (aged 34); Brunswick, Victoria
- Original team: Murtoa
- Height: 173 cm (5 ft 8 in)
- Weight: (65kg)
- Position: ruck rover

Playing career^{1}
Years	Club	Games (Goals)
1914	St Kilda	7 (5)
- ^{1} Playing statistics correct to the end of 1914.

Stanley Edward Brady (20 April 1887 – 20 June 1921) was an Australian rules footballer who played with St Kilda in the Victorian Football League (VFL). He died from pleurisy and pneumonia at the age of 34.He also served with the Mediterranean expeditionary Force
