= Harold Conradi =

Australian rules footballer

Personal information
- Full name: Harold Ernest Conradi
- Born: 28 July 1894; Clifton Hill, Victoria
- Died: 25 July 1966 (aged 71); Swan View, Western Australia
- Original team: Hawthorn (VFA)

Playing career^{1}
Years	Club	Games (Goals)
1914	Geelong	1 (0)
- ^{1} Playing statistics correct to the end of 1914.

Harold Ernest Conradi (28 July 1894 – 25 July 1966) was an Australian rules footballer who played with Geelong in the Victorian Football League (VFL).
