= Beitzel Peak =

Mountain of Ellsworth Land

Coordinates: 80°17′S 82°18′W

Beitzel Peak is a peak, 2,170 metres (7,120 ft) high, rising 1.5 nautical miles (3 km) southeast of Minaret Peak in the Marble Hills, Heritage Range. It was named by the Advisory Committee on Antarctic Names for John E. Beitzel, a geophysicist on the United States Antarctic Research Program South Pole—Queen Maud Land Traverse I and II, 1964–65 and 1965–66.

The first ascent is credited to British climbers Dominic Spicer and Rob Jarvis in late December 2009.
