= Jack Blencowe =

Australian rules footballer

Personal information
- Full name: John Francis Blencowe (originally Walter John Blencowe)
- Nickname: Snowy
- Born: 17 May 1891; Birchip, Victoria
- Died: 19 August 1951 (aged 60); East Melbourne, Victoria
- Original team: Nagambie

Playing career^{1}
Years	Club	Games (Goals)
1912	Essendon	1 (0)
1914	Geelong	2 (2)
Total		3 (2)
- ^{1} Playing statistics correct to the end of 1914.

John Francis "Snowy" Blencowe (17 May 1891 – 19 August 1951) was an Australian rules footballer who played with Essendon and Geelong in the Victorian Football League (VFL).

== Family ==
The son of Alfred George Blencowe (1867-1938), and Anastasia Blencowe (-1952), née Breen, Walter John Blencowe (later known as John Francis Blencowe) was born at Birchip, Victoria on 17 May 1891.

== Football ==
=== Essendon (VFL) ===
He played one match for the Essendon First XVIII, against Fitzroy, in the last game of the 1912 season, on 31 August 1912.

=== Geelong (VFL) ===
In 1914, while playing with the Donald Football Club in the Donald District Football Association (DDFA), Blencowe obtained employment as a hairdresser and moved to Geelong.

He played two matches for the Geelong First XVIII: against Essendon, on 20 June 1914, and against Melbourne, on 4 July 1914.

=== Port Melbourne VFA) ===
Cleared from Geelong, he played six games for the Port Melbourne First XVIII in 1919.
