= Joe Scaddan =

Australian rules footballer

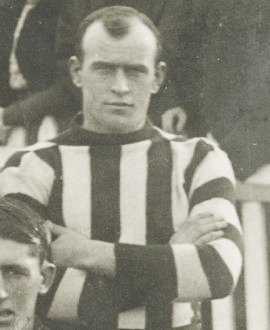
- Scaddan in 1910

Personal information
- Full name: Joseph Scaddan
- Born: 1 August 1886; Sandhurst (Bendigo), Victoria
- Died: 21 July 1971 (aged 84); Perth, Western Australia
- Original team: South Bendigo

Playing career^{1}
Years	Club	Games (Goals)
1910	Collingwood	21 (0)
1911–1915	Subiaco	74
- ^{1} Playing statistics correct to the end of 1915.

Joseph Scaddan (1 August 1886 – 21 July 1971) was an Australian rules footballer who played for Collingwood in the Victorian Football League (VFL) and Subiaco in the West Australian Football League (WAFL).

== Family ==
The son of Richard Scaddan, and Catherine Scaddan, née James, Joseph Scaddan was born at Sandhurst (now known as Bendigo) on 1 August 1886.

His brother, Albert, played at Carlton in 1914, and a brother-in-law, Tom Cain, was a successful coach in the WAFL.

== Football ==
A defender from South Bendigo, Scaddan spent just one year with Collingwood. He was one of six Collingwood footballers to play in every game of the 1910 VFL season and was a half back flanker in their winning Grand Final team.

The next stage of his career was spent in Western Australia, where he captain-coached Subiaco to a premiership in 1912. He also participated in Subiaco's 1913 and 1915 premierships, having resigned as coach.
