= Mount Rossman =

Mountain in Ellsworth Land, Antarctica

Mount Rossman (79°47′S 82°48′W) is a prominent wedge-shaped, ice-free mountain, 1,450 m, located at the north end of the Enterprise Hills between Union and Henderson Glaciers, in the Heritage Range in Antarctica. It was mapped by the United States Geological Survey (USGS) from surveys and U.S. Navy air photos from 1961 to 1966. It was named by the Advisory Committee on Antarctic Names (US-ACAN) after Rossman W. Smith, Jr., an ionospheric physicist at Eights Station, Antarctica in 1965, the Station Scientific Leader at Byrd Station, Antarctica in 1967, and a glaciologist on the Queen Maud Land Traverse, Antarctica in 1968, when it was still "Terra Incognita".

== See also ==
- Mountains in Antarctica
