= Roy MacDonald =

Australian rules footballer (1891–1941)

Personal information
- Full name: Desmond Roy Alexander MacDonald
- Born: 4 July 1891; Bowral, New South Wales
- Died: 18 October 1941 (aged 50); Heidelberg, Victoria

Playing career^{1}
Years	Club	Games (Goals)
1914	Melbourne	7 (2)
- ^{1} Playing statistics correct to the end of 1914.

Desmond Roy Alexander MacDonald (4 July 1891 – 18 October 1941) was an Australian rules footballer who played with Melbourne in the Victorian Football League (VFL).
