= Albert Bragg =

Australian rules footballer

Personal information
- Full name: William Albert Egerton Bragg
- Born: 5 August 1896; Dandenong, Victoria
- Died: 20 January 1970 (aged 73); Heidelberg, Victoria
- Original team: St Kilda District

Playing career^{1}
Years	Club	Games (Goals)
1920	St Kilda	7 (6)
- ^{1} Playing statistics correct to the end of 1920.

William Albert Egerton Bragg (5 August 1896 – 20 January 1970) was an Australian rules footballer who played for the St Kilda Football Club in the Victorian Football League (VFL).
