= Bill Lowrie =

Australian rules footballer

Personal information
- Full name: William John Lowrie
- Born: 3 January 1893; South Melbourne, Victoria
- Died: 16 November 1938 (aged 45); Royal Melbourne Hospital
- Height: 178 cm (5 ft 10 in)
- Weight: 72 kg (159 lb)

Playing career^{1}
Years	Club	Games (Goals)
1914–15, 1919–20	St Kilda	30 (27)
- ^{1} Playing statistics correct to the end of 1920.

William John Lowrie (3 January 1893 – 16 November 1938) was an Australian rules footballer who played with St Kilda in the Victorian Football League (VFL).
