= Frank Hurren =

Australian rules footballer

Personal information
- Full name: Francis Joseph Hurren
- Born: 2 February 1894; South Yarra, Victoria
- Died: 5 July 1963 (aged 69); Ballarat, Victoria
- Original team: Hawthorn
- Height: 174 cm (5 ft 9 in)

Playing career^{1}
| Years | Club | Games (Goals) |
| 1914–1915 | Essendon | 2 (1) |
- ^{1} Playing statistics correct to the end of 1915.

Francis Joseph Hurren (2 February 1894 – 5 July 1963) was an Australian rules footballer for Essendon in the Victorian Football League (VFL).

Hurren began his VFL career for Essendon in 1914. He played his final VFL match in 1915 having played 2 matches.
