= Pat Maloney (footballer) =

Australian rules footballer

Personal information
- Full name: Patrick Aloysius Maloney
- Born: 5 March 1894; Port Melbourne, Victoria
- Died: 11 February 1955 (aged 60); Melbourne, Victoria
- Original team: Port Melbourne Railways United

Playing career^{1}
Years	Club	Games (Goals)
1914–15, 1918–20	St Kilda	44 (8)
- ^{1} Playing statistics correct to the end of 1920.

Patrick Aloysius Maloney (5 March 1894 – 11 February 1955) was an Australian rules footballer who played with St Kilda in the Victorian Football League (VFL).
