= Harry Beitzel =

Australian football umpire, broadcaster & media personality

Personal information
- Full name: Harry John Beitzel
- Born: 6 April 1927; Fitzroy, Victoria, Australia
- Died: 13 August 2017 (aged 90); Gosford, New South Wales, Australia

Playing career^{1}
Years	Club	Games (Goals)	
1944	Fitzroy	0 (0)	

Umpiring career
Years	League	Role	Games
1948–1960	VFL	Field umpire	182
- ^{1} Playing statistics correct to the end of 1960.

Career highlights
- 1955 VFL Grand Final Umpire

Henry John "Harry" Beitzel (6 April 1927 – 13 August 2017) was an Australian football umpire, print, radio and television sports broadcaster and media personality best known for his contribution to Australian rules football.

== Early sporting life ==
Harry attended Melbourne's University High School. He along with fellow schoolboy (future cricket test captain) Neil Harvey developed their skills for both football and cricket. Both boys were left-hander batsmen and together share many high scoring partnerships. Both boys joined the Fitzroy Cricket Club and Beitzel won the second grade batting averages. While Harvey's cricket blossomed, Beitzel's seemed to stall. Beitzel played football with Fitzroy seconds in 1944 and he was part of the premiership team. The following year because Australia was still at war he joined the Australian Navy.

== Umpiring career ==
Harry became interested in umpiring so he joined the VFL umpires' class in 1946 and billeted out to regional Victoria, the NSW Riverina and games in Tasmania for three years. He umpired his first senior game of VFL in the Collingwood -St Kilda match at the end of 1948 VFL season which made him the youngest senior umpire at the time. Beitzel officiated in 182 senior games (including the 1955 Grand Final) from 1948 to 1960. After an operation on his achilles tendon, Beitzel regained fitness and intended to continue umpiring, but instead took up a role in the media for the 1961 season. He joined radio station 3KZ as a replacement for Jack Mueller.

== Media career ==
Beitzel later covered football for 3AW for twenty years with Tommy Lahiff and was known for his saying "Are you there? Tommy". He later joined 3AK and the ABC radio stations, as well as writing for the Herald Sun, The Truth, The Sunday Telegraph and The Australian. He also worked on television for the ABC and the Nine Network. His innovations included the introduction of statistics during broadcasts of matches, as well as comprehensive previews and reviews of games. In 2005, Beitzel rejoined 3AW as a semi-regular contributor to Rex Hunt's pre-match show. For some years, Beitzel has filed his Footy Week section each week with the Melbourne Observer newspaper.

== International rules football ==
Beitzel is also credited with pioneering the development of the composite rules sport International rules football. He drew inspiration from watching the 1966 All-Ireland Senior Football Championship Final on television, and in 1967 sent an Australian side – "The Galahs" – to play the game against an Irish side. He followed this the next year with The Australian Football World Tour, a six-match series with games played against Irish teams in Ireland, the UK and the United States. The 1968 Galahs also played exhibition matches of Australian rules throughout the tour, including a game in Bucharest, Romania.

== Honours and recognition ==
In 2000, Beitzel was inducted into the Melbourne Cricket Ground's Media Hall of Fame. In 2006, he was inducted into the Australian Football Hall of Fame as a media inductee.

== Imprisonment ==
Beitzel became the face for "English soccer pools" in Australia. In October 1994, Beitzel was sentenced to 18 months jail, with a minimum of eight months to be served, after pleading guilty to obtaining financial advantage by deception over matters related to his work for a lottery organisation. Beitzel's downfall was that he introduced lottery winners to a fraudulent financial advisor who took all their money. He served his sentence initially at Pentridge Prison and then at the open, minimum-security Morwell River Prison Farm. Beitzel strenuously denied that he had ever intentionally committed a crime.

== Personal life ==
The son of former St Kilda and Fitzroy player Arnold Beitzel.

Beitzel had three daughters and a son. As of 2014 he lived in Sydney with his second wife, Karolyn. Beitzel had been ill since 2014, after losing sight in one eye and suffering a fall, he also had heart problems. He died on 13 August 2017, aged 90.
