= Bert Trahair =

Australian rules footballer

Personal information
- Full name: Albert Trahair
- Born: 30 August 1891; Bendigo, Victoria
- Died: 11 September 1953 (aged 62); Long Gully, Victoria
- Original team: South Bendigo

Playing career^{1}
Years	Club	Games (Goals)
1914	Melbourne	18 (7)
- ^{1} Playing statistics correct to the end of 1914.

Bert Trahair (30 August 1891 – 11 September 1953) was an Australian rules footballer who played for the Melbourne Football Club in the Victorian Football League (VFL).
