= Arnold Beitzel =

Australian rules footballer

Personal information
- Full name: Henry Arnold Beitzel
- Born: 27 May 1897; Pakenham, Victoria
- Died: 6 November 1982 (aged 85); Townsville, Queensland
- Original team: Shepparton
- Height: 180 cm (5 ft 11 in)

Playing career^{1}
Years	Club	Games (Goals)
1919–1920	St Kilda	14 (18)
1921	Fitzroy	5 (5)
Total		19 (23)
- ^{1} Playing statistics correct to the end of 1921.

Henry Arnold Beitzel (27 May 1897 – 6 November 1982) was an Australian rules footballer who played for the St Kilda Football Club and Fitzroy Football Club in the Victorian Football League (VFL).

In July 1915, Beitzel enlisted to serve in World War I, having his right thumb amputated while fighting in North Africa and later fighting in France. He also served in World War II.

Arnold's son, Harry Beitzel was the umpire in charge of the 1955 VFL Grand Final.
