= Herbert Roberts (footballer) =

Australian rules footballer

Personal information
- Full name: Herbert Arthur Roberts
- Born: 4 December 1890; Bendigo, Victoria
- Died: 17 September 1974 (aged 83); Prahran, Victoria
- Original team: Collingwood Districts
- Height: 170 cm (5 ft 7 in)
- Weight: 64 kg (141 lb)

Playing career^{1}
Years	Club	Games (Goals)
1914	Melbourne	1 (0)
- ^{1} Playing statistics correct to the end of 1914.

Herbert Arthur Roberts (4 December 1890 – 17 September 1974) was an Australian rules footballer who played with Melbourne in the Victorian Football League (VFL).
