= Wal Rogers =

Australian rules footballer

Personal information
- Full name: Walter Benjamin Rogers
- Born: 10 May 1889; Chiltern, Victoria
- Died: 18 July 1965 (aged 76)
- Original team: Public Service Club
- Height: 178 cm (5 ft 10 in)
- Weight: 81 kg (179 lb)

Playing career^{1}
Years	Club	Games (Goals)
1914	Richmond	1 (0)
- ^{1} Playing statistics correct to the end of 1914.

Walter Benjamin Rogers (10 May 1889 – 18 July 1965) was an Australian rules footballer who played with Richmond in the Victorian Football League (VFL).
