= Mount Dolence =

Mountain in Ellsworth Land, Antarctica

Mount Dolence (79°51′S 83°13′W) is a remarkably spired bare rock mountain, 1,950 metres (6,400 ft) high, located in the northwestern extremity of the Enterprise Hills and separated from the Edson Hills by the upper part of Union Glacier, in the Heritage Range, Ellsworth Mountains. It was named by the University of Minnesota Ellsworth Mountains Party, 1962–63, for Jerry D. Dolence, a geologist and a member of the party. In February 2023 Alex Honnold published pictures of a new climb that he and Estaban Mena did on Mt. Dolence.

== See also ==
- Mountains in Antarctica
