= Arthur Mann (Australian footballer) =

Australian rules footballer

Personal information
- Full name: Arthur Ernest Elliott Mann
- Born: 26 July 1889; Armadale, Victoria
- Died: 2 January 1949 (aged 59); Caulfield, Victoria
- Original team: Brighton

Playing career^{1}
Years	Club	Games (Goals)
1914, 1919	Essendon	3 (0)
- ^{1} Playing statistics correct to the end of 1919.

Arthur Ernest Elliott Mann (26 July 1889 – 2 January 1949) was an Australian rules footballer who played for the Essendon Football Club in the Victorian Football League (VFL).
