= Thomas Wallis Kelynack =

Melbourne journalist

- Born: 1868; Long Gully, Bendigo, Victoria
- Died: 16 November 1936 (aged 68); Moreland, Victoria
- Occupations: Crime reporter, sports journalist
- Spouse: Catherine Mary Smith (m.1891)
- Children: 5
- Writing career
- Pen name: Kickero
- Years active: 1889-1930

Thomas Wallis Kelynack (1868 – 16 November 1936) was a leading Melbourne journalist/police roundsman in the early 20th century, especially noted for his extensive, authoritative, and well-regarded sports journalism in The Herald of Melbourne — especially in relation to Australian rules football and cricket — published under the nom de guerre of "Kickero".

== Family ==
The son of Charles Kelynack (1825-1894), and Jane Kelynack (1830-1890), née Wallis, Thomas Wallis Kelynack was born at Long Gully, Bendigo, Victoria, in 1868.

He married Catherine Mary Smith (1864-1928) in 1891; they had five children.

== Journalist ==
He joined The Herald in 1889 — following his earlier press experience in Bendigo and Broken Hill — and he retired from The Herald, and from journalism, in 1930.

== Death ==
He died at his residence at Moreland, Victoria, on 16 November 1936.
