= Jack Huntington =

Australian rules footballer

Personal information
- Full name: John Ernest Huntington
- Born: 23 May 1893; Coburg, Victoria
- Died: 17 July 1971 (aged 78); Preston, Victoria
- Original team: Coburg

Playing career^{1}
Years	Club	Games (Goals)
1914–15, 1919–20	Melbourne	43 (43)
- ^{1} Playing statistics correct to the end of 1920.

John Ernest Huntington (23 May 1893 – 17 July 1971) was an Australian rules footballer who played with Melbourne in the Victorian Football League (VFL).
