= Horseshoe Valley (Antarctica) =

Valley in Antarctica

Coordinates: 80°5′S 82°0′W

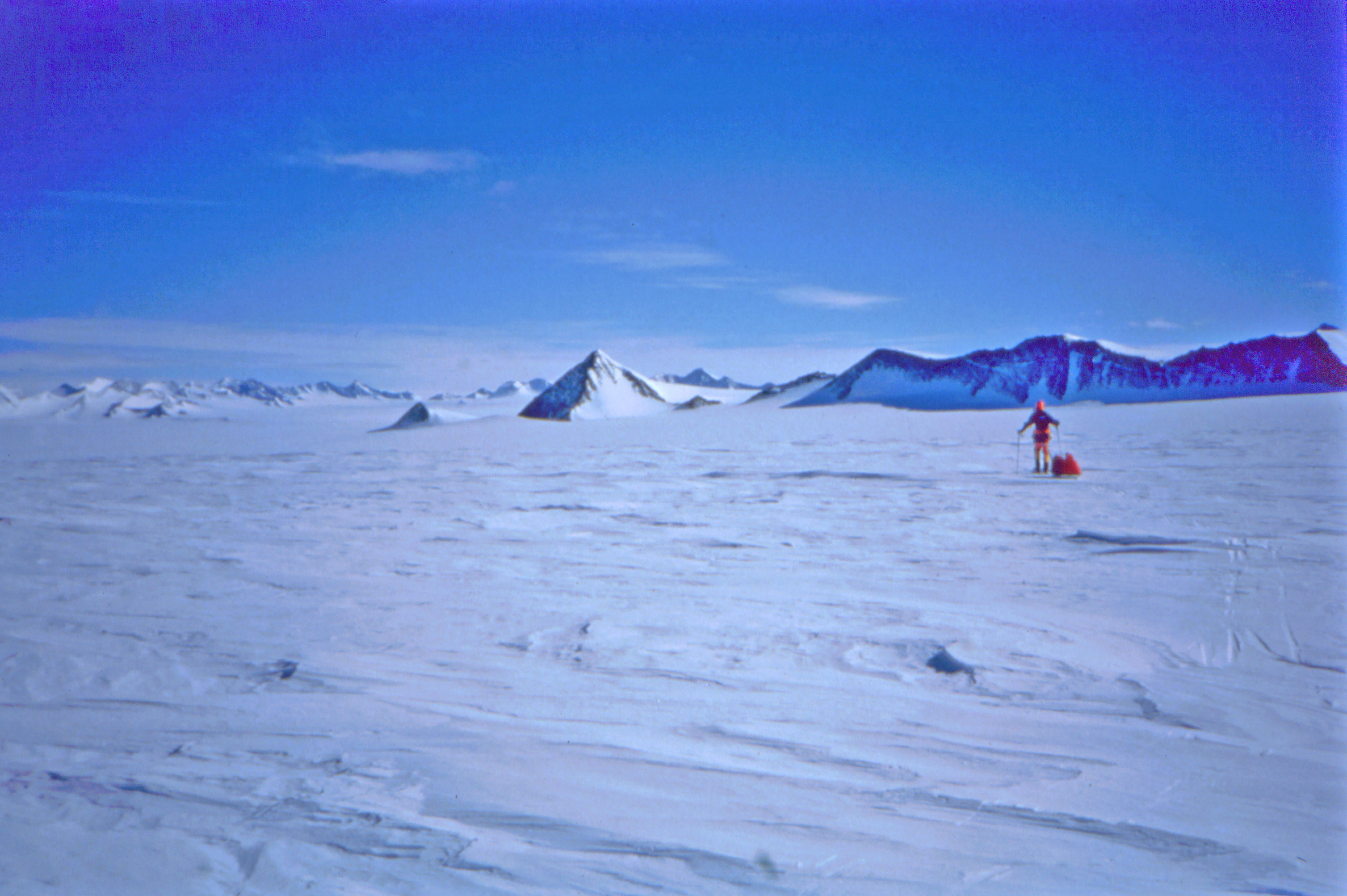
The Horseshoe Valley

Horseshoe Valley is a large ice-filled valley in the southern Heritage Range of the Ellsworth Mountains of Antarctica. It is outlined by the semicircular arrangement of the Independence, Marble, Liberty and Enterprise Hills. Approval of the descriptive name was suggested by the University of Minnesota Ellsworth Mountains Party, 1962–63, who reported the name was in wide use by U.S. Navy flyers in the area.
