= Albert Scaddan =

Australian rules footballer

Personal information
- Full name: Albert Cecil Scaddan
- Born: 4 December 1887; Sandhurst, Victoria
- Died: 21 May 1967 (aged 79); Bendigo, Victoria
- Original team: South Bendigo

Playing career^{1}
Years	Club	Games (Goals)
1914	Carlton	3 (1)
- ^{1} Playing statistics correct to the end of 1914.

Albert Cecil Scaddan (4 December 1887 – 21 May 1967) was an Australian rules footballer who played for the Carlton Football Club in the Victorian Football League (VFL).
