= St Kilda East =

- Suburb
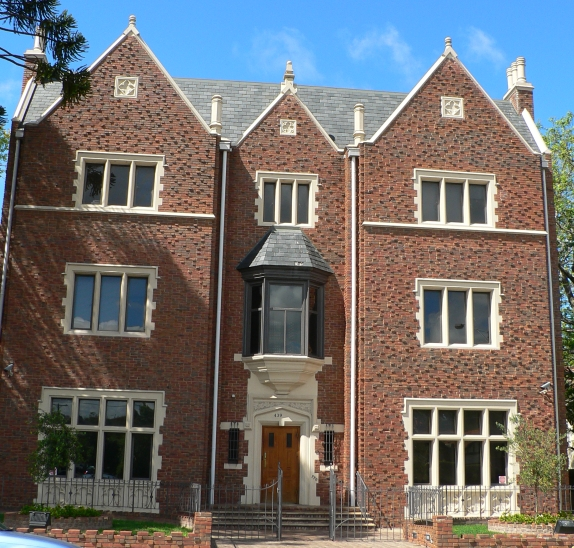
- "770" Synagogue, Inkerman Street

- Interactive map of St Kilda East
- Coordinates: 37.862°S 144.997°E
- Country: Australia
- State: Victoria
- City: Melbourne
- LGAs: City of Glen Eira; City of Port Phillip
- Location: 6 km (3.7 mi) from Melbourne
- Established: 1850s

Government
  - State electorates: Caulfield; Prahran
  - Federal division: Macnamara

Area
  - Total: 2.3 km^{2} (0.89 sq mi)
- Elevation: 20 m (66 ft)

Population
  - Total: 12,571 (2021 census)
  - Density: 5,470/km^{2} (14,160/sq mi)
- Postcode: 3183
Suburbs around St Kilda East
Windsor	Prahran	Armadale
St Kilda	St Kilda East	Caulfield North
Elwood	Balaclava, Elsternwick	Caulfield South

St Kilda East is a suburb in Melbourne, Victoria, Australia, 6 km south-east of Melbourne's Central Business District, located within the Cities of Glen Eira and Port Phillip local government areas. St Kilda East recorded a population of 12,571 at the 2021 census.

St Kilda East is one of the more diverse and densely populated suburbs of Melbourne. It has a prominent Hasidic Jewish community, descended from Polish and Russian immigrants. Quiet and residential, it is quite different from the adjacent suburb of St Kilda. However, the area around Carlisle Street is very diverse with a strong arts, alternative and indie community.

== History ==
The St Kilda East area was part of the lands of the Boonwurrung tribe of Aboriginal Australians before being first settled by Anglo-British settlers in the 1850s. Smaller timber shacks were common during the early 1860s to 1870s, with larger houses on the bigger subdivisions. During the late 1870s, terraced housing began around the railway line.

Alma Park was laid out and areas surrounding the park were set aside for religious purposes, resulting in a large number of convents and chapels along Chapel Street and either side of Dandenong Road. In the 1950s, speculative development resulted in the alteration of many of the suburb's streetscapes. Centred on Chapel Street and to the east of the railway line, flats became common in the area.

Recent development of the suburbs, rising land values and excellent access to public transport has seen recent gentrification in the area. Modern infill medium density apartments are being built on many blocks, with the Carlisle Street area designated an activity centre under the Melbourne 2030 planning scheme.

== Demographics ==
64.6% were born in Australia. Other Countries of birth top responses were England 3.9%, India 2.3%, New Zealand 2.2%, United States of America 2.2% & Israel 1.7%.

Religious affiliation top responses were No Religion (so described) 41.5%, Judaism 26.4%, Catholic 11.2%, Not Stated 7% & Anglican 2.8%.

== Education institutions ==
The main schools in St Kilda East are; the Edmund Rice Campus of St Mary’s College, the Caulfield Campus of Caulfield Grammar School, Malvern Community School, Ripponlea Primary School, the St Kilda East campus of Mount Scopus Memorial College, Yeshivah College, Cheder Levi Yitchak, Bnos Chana, Beth Rivkah Ladies College and part of St Michael's Grammar School. The Rabbinical College of Australia and New Zealand (Yeshivah Gedolah Zal), a tertiary institution for the training of Orthodox rabbis and religious functionaries in the Chabad-Lubavitch denomination, is located on Alexandra Street.

Ripponlea Primary School (No. 4087) was opened on 3 July 1922 with 400 pupils in grades prep to eight. John Edward Woodruff (1867-1944) was the school's first headmaster, and he served as such until his retirement in 1932. In 2011 enrolment at the school was 272 students across prep to grade 6.

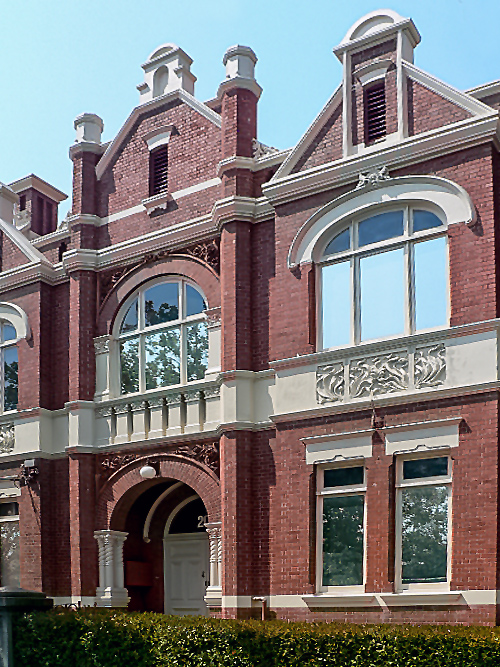
Dandenong Road buildings of Christian Brothers College now known as St Marys College, St Kilda

== Culture ==
St Kilda East is home to the Red Stitch Actors Theatre, a professional theatre, located on the corner of Dandenong Road and Chapel Street.

== Transport ==
St Kilda East is served by several forms of public transport.

Major tram routes operate on Carlisle Street/Balaclava Road, Chapel Street, Dandenong Road and St Kilda Road.

Buses operate along Orrong Road and Hotham Street.

Balaclava and Ripponlea railway stations, on the Sandringham line, also service the suburb.

== Landmarks ==
=== Residential architecture ===
The suburb is dominated by 1960s flats. There are, however, some pockets of preserved heritage streetscapes. Godfrey Avenue has well-preserved rows of Edwardian cottages on either side of the street and is protected by council heritage controls. Camden Street has several rows of Victorian semi-detached timber workers cottages.

Some large Victorian buildings remain along Inkerman Street and Alma Road, but have been since subdivided into flats. The streets in between have a mix of housing from different periods.

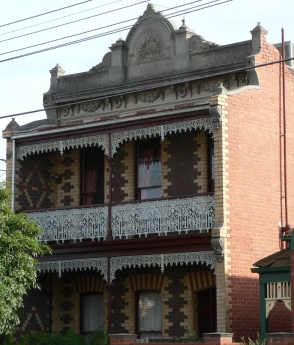
Clement House, Inkerman Street (built 1888). One of the suburb's grander surviving polychrome Victorian era terraces

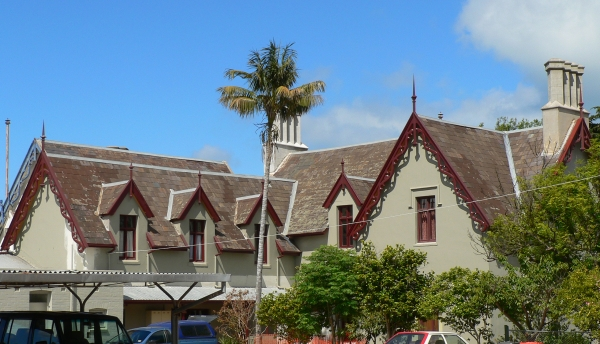
Built in 1857, Glenfern Mansion on the corner of Inkerman and Hotham Streets was home to the Boyd family and is now a writers' colony

=== Non-residential architecture ===
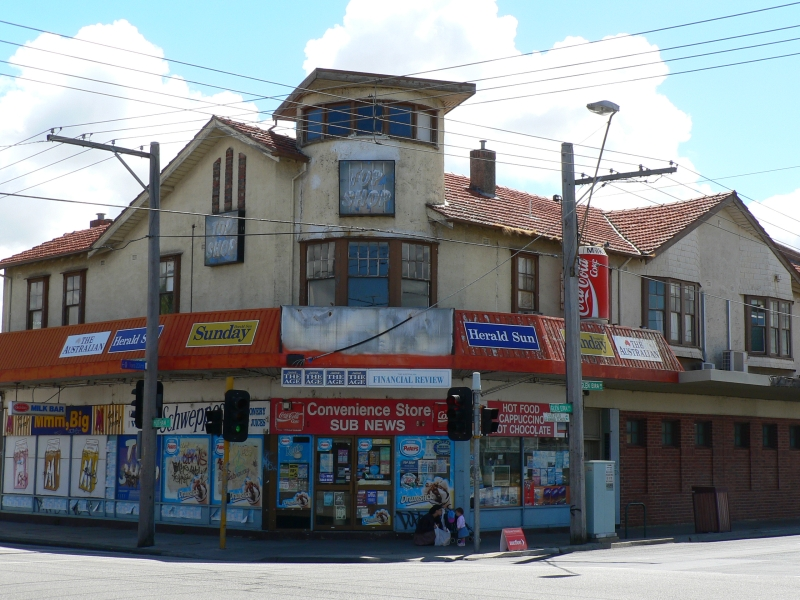
The Top Shop on the corner of Glen Eira Road and Hotham Street is an unusual Edwardian Arts and Crafts design

=== Places of worship ===
There are several churches in St Kilda East, and multiple synagogues, reflecting the area's extensive history of both Christian and Jewish migration. Many of these buildings have historic significance with heritage registration, and often form various religious precincts.

==== Judaism ====
Yeshiva Centre is the headquarters and main synagogue of Chabad in Melbourne.

Chabad House of Caulfield is a replica of the New York headquarters of the Chabad movement at 770 Eastern Parkway.

==== Anglican ====
The bluestone All Saints' Anglican Church on Chapel Street was built in 1861, and is reputed to have the largest seating capacity of any Anglican parish church in the Southern hemisphere, with a capacity of 1500 in the pews. The neighbouring Parish Hall was built as an extension to the church in 1909 and was restored in 2005 during a conversion into a boutique gymnasium.

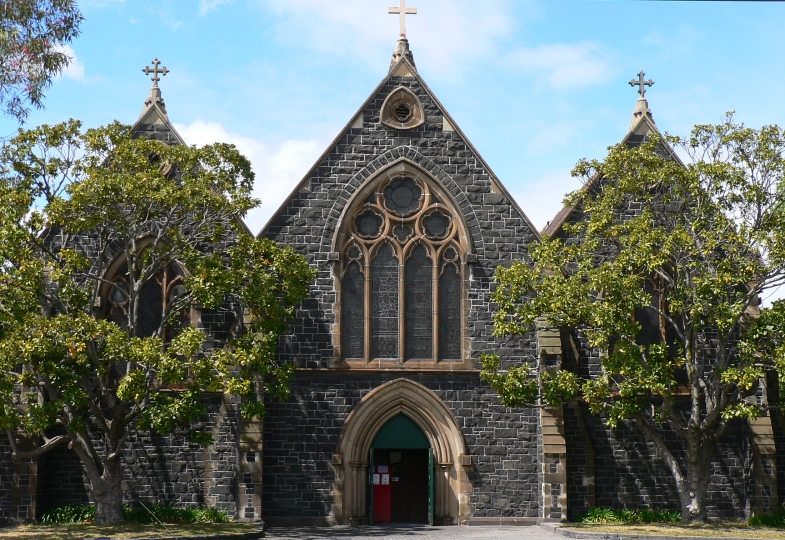
All Saints Anglican Church

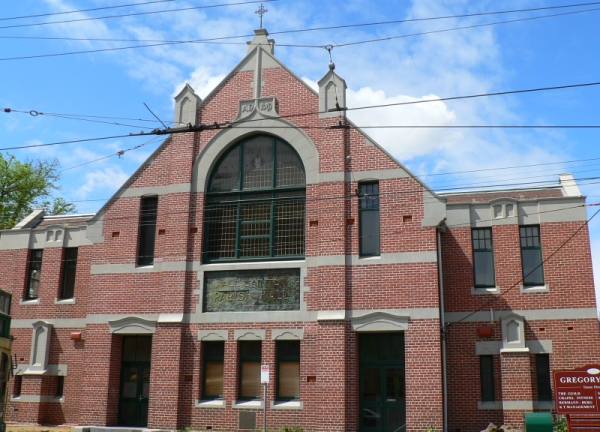
All Saints Parish Hall

Another Anglican Parish Church is St James the Great, established in 1914 and located at 435 Inkerman Street. St James was founded in close association with the former Church of England St John's Theological College, which was located in nearby Alma Road, on the lot now bisected by Wilgah Street. The Diocese closed the seminary in 1919 amid some controversy directed towards the then perceived Anglo-Catholicity of the seminary (which was at odds with the prevailing sentiment of the diocese at the time). The land was sold and subdivided.

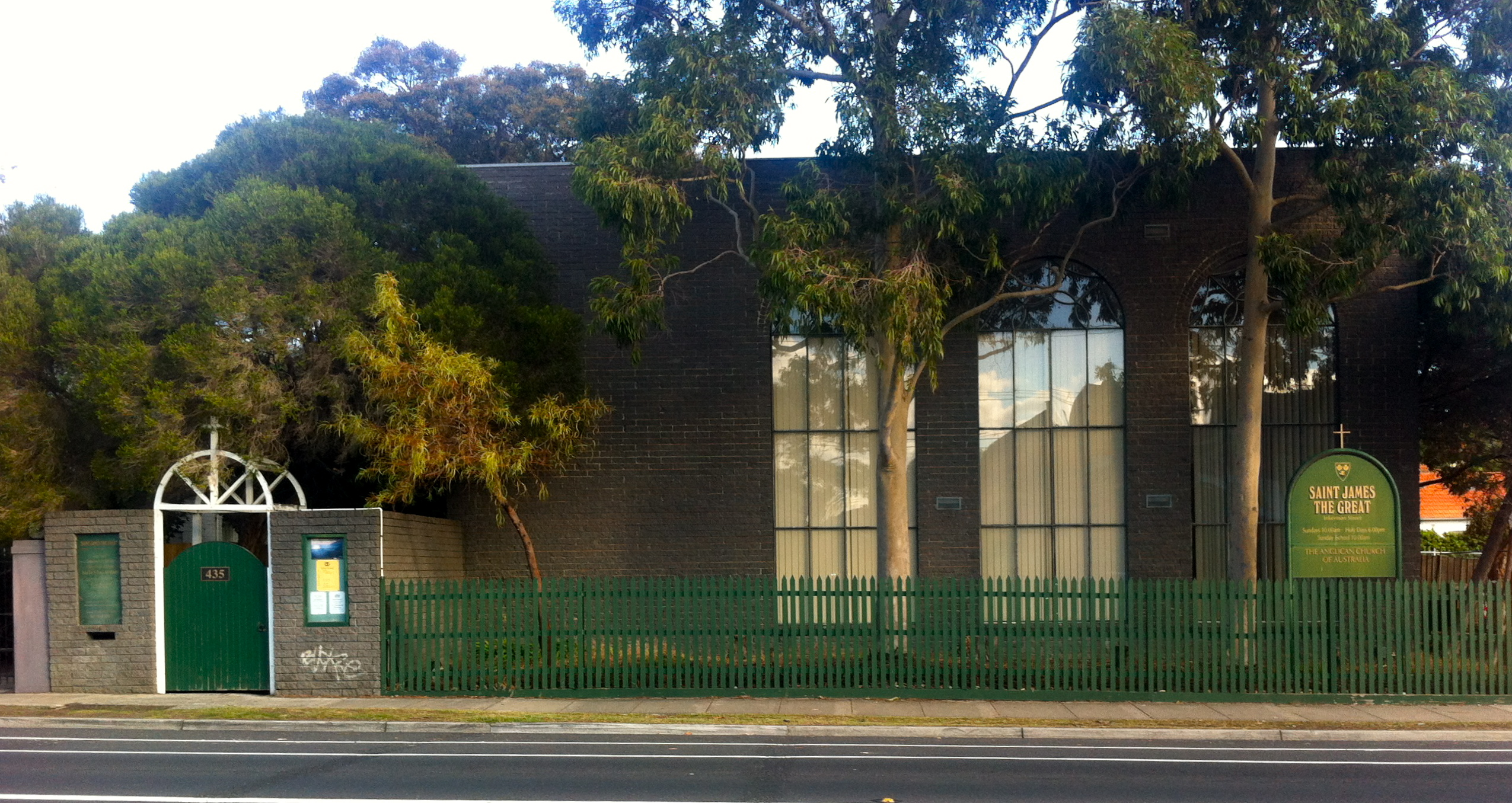
St James the Great Anglican Church

==== Roman Catholic ====
The St Mary's Catholic Church (208-214 Dandenong Road), designed by William Wardell and built in 1858, was one of the earliest bluestone churches.

The East St Kilda Uniting Church, on the corner of Hotham and Inkerman Streets, was built in 1887, to the design of architect Hillson Beasley. Originally a church of the Congregational Union of Australia prior to the formation of the Uniting Church, it was sold by the Uniting Church to the Roman Catholic Diocese of Melbourne in 2011 for the establishment of an Eastern Orthodox use church, according to the provisions of an Ordinariate.

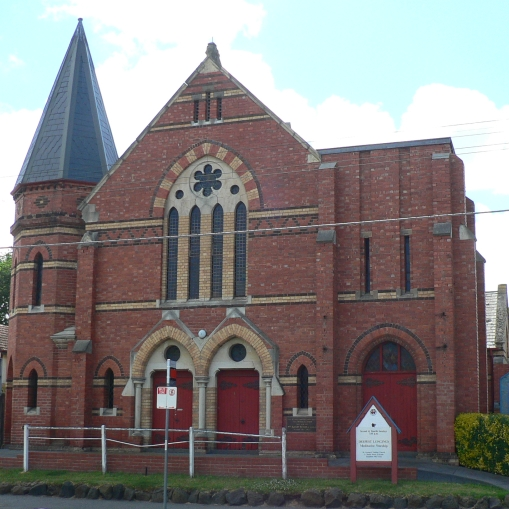
Former East St Kilda Congregational Church (now Byzantine Russian Catholic use)

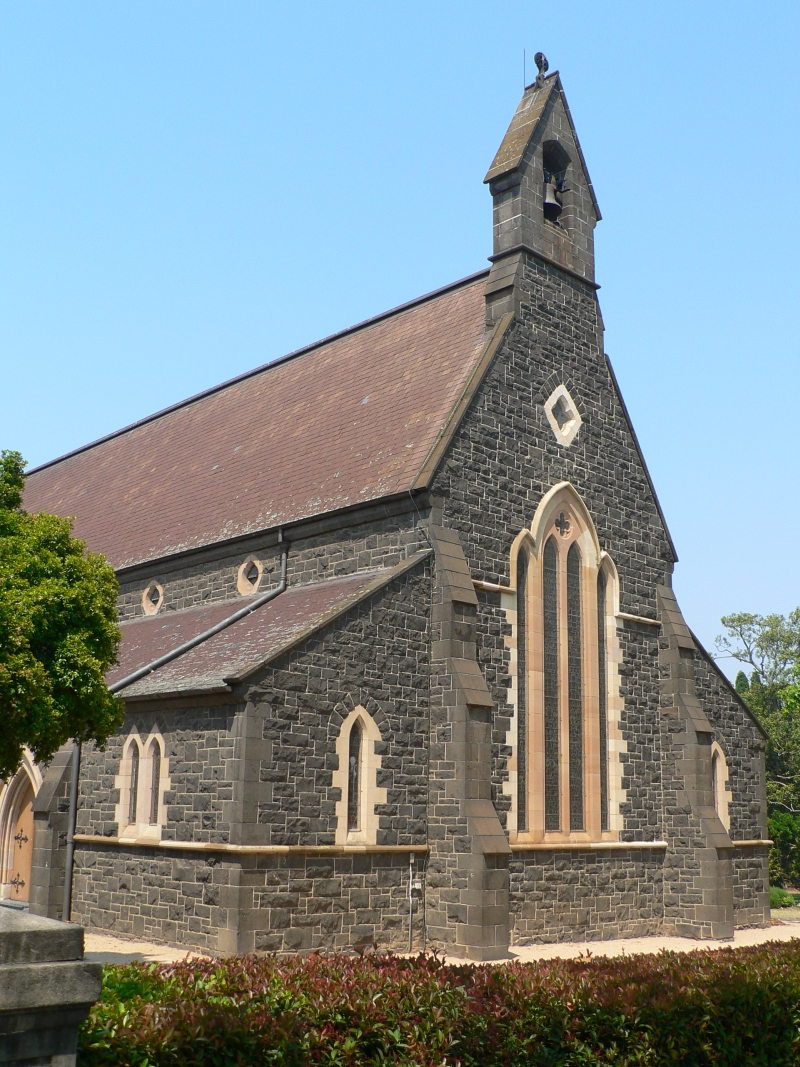
St Mary's Roman Catholic Church

==== Uniting Church ====
The St George's Uniting Church, on Chapel Street, was built in 1877, to the design of Albert Purchas and is listed on the Victorian Heritage Register. It has been leased by St Michael's Grammar School since 1990.

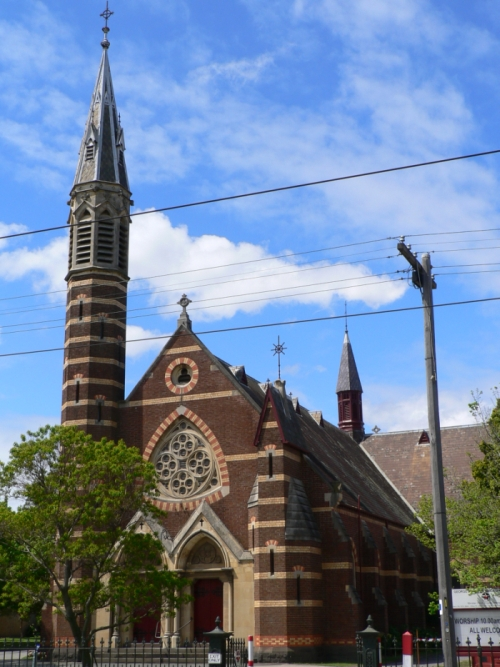
St George's Uniting Church

==== Orthodox ====
The former Balaclava Corps Hall, built in 1929 on Camden Street, is an unusual design, featuring castellated motifs. It was sold to the Autocephalous Orthodox Ukrainian Church in 1976, now being the parish of The Sacred Assumption of the Holy Virgin.

=== Public spaces ===
The suburb's main park is Alma Park, a large park designed by Clement Hodgkinson in 1867, which was split into two linear parks by the Sandringham railway line in 1858. The park has recreational facilities, including a heritage rotunda, a cricket and football (soccer) oval and bike paths, as well as large stands of elm trees, Moreton Bay figs and native vegetation areas.

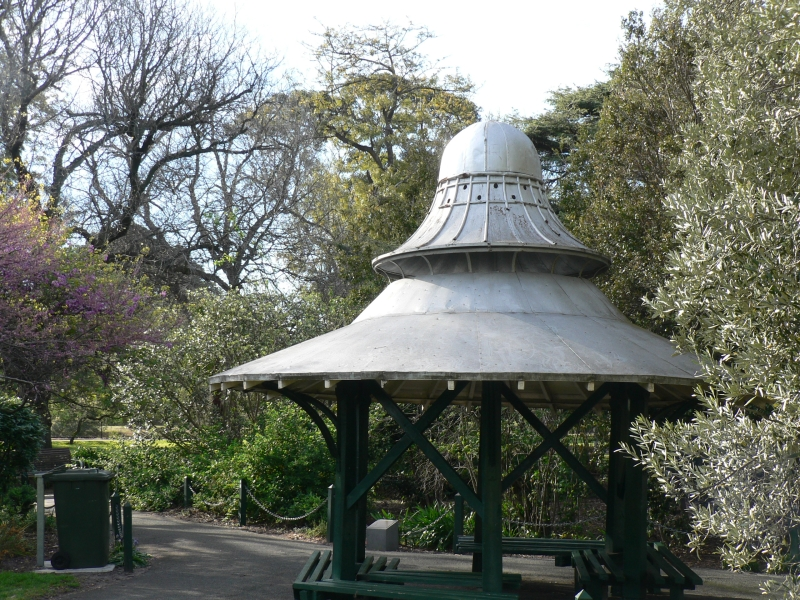
Hexagonal rotunda in Alma Park, probably built between 1910 and 1915

==== St Kilda General Cemetery ====
St Kilda Cemetery covers a large block bordered by Dandenong Road, Hotham Street, Alma Road and Alexandra Street. It is bounded by a historic wall and contains many Victorian era graves. The cemetery is the resting place of Alfred Deakin, the second Prime Minister of Australia, and Albert Jacka VC, MC, barrister and Mayor of St Kilda (1930).

=== East St Kilda Heritage Study ===
In 2004 the City of Port Phillip commissioned a heritage study that recommended the following areas as heritage precincts and places. The Council adopted most of the recommendations in 2004 and the controls which apply to each of the areas so listed.

Heritage Precincts

- Chusan Street (from 1886 onwards)
- Godfrey Avenue / Raglan Street (settled early 1910s)
- Hammerdale Avenue (Former grounds of "Hammerdale House" from 1868, demolished and subdivided 1925)
- Holroyd Court (former grounds of "Fernacre" from c. 1867, demolished and subdivided 1936)
- Kalymna Grove / Inkerman Street (Market gardens until 1914, subdivided and housing erected between 1914 and 1924)
- Mooltan Avenue (Former grounds of "Mooltan Estate" subdivided 1922)
- Murchison Street /Alma Road (Former site of St John's College Anglican Seminary closed 1919, subdivision and building continuing until the late 1930s)
- Orange Grove (from the 1890s)

Individual Heritage Places

- 31-35 Alexandra Street (Houses c. 1887–88)
- 5 -7 Balstan Street (Former Kynoch & Co. Factory c. 1922, 1940)
- 16 Balstan Street (Cottage - oldest surviving dwelling Pre 1863, extended 1869)
- 52 Balstan Street (Electrical Substation, c. 1929)
- 316- 320 Inkerman Street (Houses c. 1888)
- 20 Shirley Grove
- 22 Shirley Grove (House - "Pine Nook" c. 1920)

For some reason, the following properties, although included in the heritage study recommendations, were not included in the overlay.

- 42 Hotham Street (House c. 1927)
- 34 Young Street (House - "Warby Cottage" c. 1870)

== Heritage sites ==
St Kilda East contains a number of heritage-listed sites, including:

- 10 Chapel Street: St Kilda Artillery Orderly Room and Drill Hall
- 417 Inkerman Road: Glenfern House
- 216-238 Dandenong Road; 1-9 and 2-10 Ardoch Avenue; 2-8 Pilley Street: Ardoch Flats
- 260-288 Dandenong Road: St Kilda Cemetery
- 2 Chapel Street: All Saints Church, Hall and Former Vicarage
- Dandenong Road: Ornamental Tramway Overhead Poles

== Notable residents ==
- Ada Mary à Beckett (1872-1948), biologist; leader of the kindergarten movement in Australia, first woman appointed as lecturer at University of Melbourne (lived in Lansdowne Street).
- Ted à Beckett (1907-1989), Australian Test cricketer, son of Ada, born in St Kilda East.
- Hugh Gemmell Lamb-Smith (1889-1951), educator; landed at Anzac Cove on 25 April 1915; member of the staff of Caulfield Grammar School from 1913 to 1951 (lived in Wavenhoe Avenue).
- William Lanfranchi (a.k.a. "Bill Lang") (1882-1952), Richmond footballer; Australian champion heavyweight boxer; first Australian to fight for a world heavyweight title, losing to Tommy Burns by a knockout, in September 1908 (lived in Hotham Street).
- Lady Joan à Beckett Lindsay (1896-1984), Joan à Beckett Weigall, playwright, essayist, visual artist, and novelist (author of Picnic at Hanging Rock), was born in East St Kilda, grew up there, and went to School at Carhue Ladies' College (lived in Alma Road).
- Sir John Madden (1884-1918), member of the Victorian Legislative Assembly; Chief Justice of Victoria (built and lived at "Cloyne Mansion", 12 Chapel Street).
- James Newbery (1843-1895), museum administrator; industrial chemist (lived in Hotham Street).
- Arthur John "Doc" Pearce (1881-1902), St Kilda footballer; champion miler (lived in Grosvenor Street).
- Cezary Skubiszewski (1948-), composer for film, television, and orchestra.
- Brett Tucker (1972-), actor, lived on Hughenden Road.
- Jessica Weintraub (born 2007), Olympic rhythmic gymnast.

== See also ==
- City of Caulfield – Parts of St Kilda East were previously within this former local government area.
- City of St Kilda – Parts of St Kilda East were previously within this former local government area.
