= St James the Great, St Kilda East =

St James the Great

- Location within Victoria
- 37.86713°S 145.00333°E
- Location: St Kilda, Victoria
- Country: Australia
- Denomination: Anglican Church of Australia
- Churchmanship: Anglo-Catholic
- Website: stjamesthegreat.org.au

History
- Status: Church
- Founded: 1914
- Dedicated: 23 June 1915
- Consecrated: July 1964

Architecture
- Functional status: Active
- Architect(s): North & Williams (1912)
- Construction cost: £2,600

Administration
- Province: Victoria
- Diocese: Melbourne
- Deanery: Port Phillip

Clergy
- Vicar: Paul Bower

St James the Great, St Kilda East, is an Anglican parish church in the Melbourne suburb of City of Glen Eira in Victoria, Australia.

Located in Inkerman Street, St Kilda East, since its establishment in 1914, the parish is in the Anglican Diocese of Melbourne and is the smallest parish in terms of geographical area. From its beginnings in the chapel of St John's Theological College the church has been observantly Anglo-Catholic in its traditions of liturgy and teaching. Since the 1940s the municipality has gradually become the heart of Melbourne's Haredi Jewish community.

The parish was founded in 1914, the church building commenced in early 1915 with the first regular Sunday service in the completed church on 27 June 1915.

== History ==
=== Establishment ===
The parish was founded in 1914 coinciding with the subdivision of local market gardens and agistment paddocks as Melbourne's suburbs expanded. Although the larger churches of All Saints' Anglican Church, St Mary's Caulfield and Holy Trinity Balaclava were nearby, the Archbishop of Melbourne, Lowther Clarke, responded positively to petitioners for a new parish and determined that there was sufficient support for the establishment of another parish in the easternmost part of what was then St Kilda. Prior to the establishment of the parish, All Saints' East St Kilda had provided the outreach of the Leslie Street Mission Hall for the people of the area from 15 October 1896 until sometime in 1911.

=== Origins at St John's Theological College ===
A number of local people had worshipped for some years with the students at St John's Theological College, a five-acre site located at 195-201 Alma Road, St Kilda East (and formerly the old Cumloden School from 1891 to 1905).

In 1906 Archbishop Lowther Clarke appointed Reginald Stephen as warden of St John's Theological College, which he held concurrently as the Dean of Melbourne from 1910 until his appointment as the Bishop of Tasmania in February 1914. St John's was intended to provide theological training for non-matriculated men without the means to enter university. John Stephen Hart was a lecturer at the college from 1907, succeeding Stephen as warden and chaplain in 1914.

Preston (2011) reports that Ridley College was "opened in 1910 by an evangelical faction, competed with St John's, and was the preferred option of the evangelically-minded rural Bendigo and Gippsland dioceses." In 1919 the theological college was closed by the diocese as it was deemed that the Tractarian influences fostered by the college were at odds with the preferred churchmanship of the diocese. This was despite Hart having recently been elected as Dean of Melbourne; the closure of the college left Hart without an income as the position of dean was non-stipendiary at the time.

Shortly afterwards in 1920 the property was sold, the buildings demolished, the site subdivided and bisected by the creation of Wilgah Street.

=== Foundation ===
By 1914 the local members of the congregation had grown to such an extent that the college chapel had become crowded during services. Some of the local members of the congregation petitioned for the establishment of a parish church where they could continue the Anglo-Catholic liturgical practices to which they were accustomed. Archbishop Clarke excised lands from the parishes of All Saints’ East St Kilda and St Mary's Caulfield in spite of the vigorous protests from both of these parishes. Land was procured on the corner of Inkerman and Alexandra Streets in two lots: the first to build a church on Inkerman Street on 28 May 1913 for £879, the second lot for the establishment of a vicarage behind the church in a "battle axe block" on 24 April 1914 for £500.

The new parish was promulgated on 19 April 1914 at the college and the college chapel continued to be their home until 21 June 1915. The choice of St James as the patron saint of the parish reflected the relationship with St John's College as the apostles James and John were also brothers (the sons of Zebedee).

The foundation stone of church building was laid by Archbishop Lowther Clarke on 10 April 1915. In the service which accompanied the laying of the stone he acknowledged the hospitality of St John's Theological College in making available its chapel to the congregation while the church was being built, as well as publicly announcing the death the previous day of Bishop James Moorhouse. The church was dedicated by Archbishop Clarke some three months later on 23 June 1915 (a Wednesday), with services commencing the following Sunday, 27 June 1915.

The vicarage was completed in 1918, with the incumbent, the Revd J. C. Nankivell, raising more than £200 "singlehandedly" towards the costs. A church hall (now St James House) was completed in 1958 and a separate kindergarten building in 1965.

=== Early years as a parish church ===
The first incumbent was Garnet Eric Shaw, a graduate of the University of Melbourne, taking his BA while resident at Trinity College, and then completing his theological training through St John's College (ThL). He was ordained as a priest in 1911 and appointed as the first Anglican chaplain to the Australian Navy in 1912. Shaw was well accustomed to life at sea, having previously worked extensively in the pearling industry, and holding both a mate's and a master's mariner certificates. He resigned from the Navy because he objected to compulsory attendance at divine service for naval personnel, which was at odds with Navy policy at that time. After the outbreak of the Great War, he decided to resign from the parish and enlisted for active service. It was reported at the time that he did not intend to return to ministry after the war, defending his position that "though the Church [was] right in its principles, it [did] not always follow its principles into practice". Shaw survived the war, having been accepted for officer training and active service in France, and eventually being appointed a chaplain in the AIF. After the war he returned to parish life: his war service records indicate that in applying for his service medals (British War Medal, and Victory Medal) he was the incumbent of All Soul's South Sassafras (Kallista) in 1924.

The first churchwarden of St James was Arthur Knox, a member of the parish until his death at the age of 84 in 1944.

The next incumbent, A. B. Burnaby, was inducted on 2 February 1916 having previously been the curate of the neighbouring parish of All Saints. Burnaby became ill soon after and was unable to continue with his duties in December 1916. A.E. Wood served as interim for approximately three months until June 1917, prior to taking up duties at Christ Church, South Yarra.

In July 1917 John Cuthbert Nankivell was appointed, only to be removed by the archbishop in 1919 despite the support of many parishioners due to suspicions of Nankivell "romanising" the parish through the use of "devotional practices such as prayers for the departed" His removal coincided with the closure of St John's College. It was reported in the press that he had resigned the parish in favour of a temporary appointment as hospital chaplain pending his return to Great Britain.

Canon M. A. Snodgrass, the previous incumbent of St Paul's Geelong, was appointed to St James' in April 1919, married Elsie Kiddle of Toorak in 1922, and then resigned in November 1923 after which they departed for an extended tour of Europe, arriving back in Australia in May 1925. Snodgrass died in December 1929.

H. R. Potter, having previously served with Canon Snodgrass at St Paul's Geelong, was vicar until April 1936 when W. Albert Shaw was appointed. Shaw, who had previously been vicar of St Cuthbert's Brunswick East, for 19 years, was 62 years of age when he arrived at St James and was incumbent for five years until his death in December 1941.

=== Vicars ===
- G. E. Shaw (1914–1916)
- A. B. Burnaby (1916- 1917)
- J. C. Nankivell (1917–1919)
- M. A. Snodgrass (1919–1923)
- H. R. Potter (1923–1936)
- W. A. Shaw (1936 -1941, his death)
- W. G. A. Green (1942–1960)
- H. R. Smythe (1960–1970)
- A. E. Palmer (1970–1973)
- G. R. Davey (1973–1974)
- J. K. R. Good (1974–1977)
- R. F. Kelly (1977–2015)
- P. Bower (2019-present)

=== Building and grounds ===
Construction commenced at the beginning of the First World War: the original church building (and the vicarage) were modest and restrained; the sanctuary end (liturgical east) facing south. There was very little sanctuary area – comprising a "wooden chancel on the south side where it [was] proposed ultimately to extend... in accordance with the plans" and the interior brickwork was pointed but not rendered. The internal roof structure was lined with exposed beams and remains so to this day.

Originally from the north and south transepts of All Saints' East St Kilda, the pews in St James’ were "donated" by All Saints' which nonetheless billed St James' for their removal and for the renovation of the transept floors. Brass plates of the original renters of the pews at All Saints' are still visible. The first incumbent, Shaw, objected to pew rents on principle, and refused to institute this practice at St James.

The original intention was to build in stages, with the ultimate church arranged in proper liturgical axis (sanctuary eastwards) featuring a long nave and west door facing onto Alexandra Street, to be "surmounted by a large square tower, with a spire in the centre".

Tennis courts and a clubhouse were added in early 1922, opened by Archbishop Lees in April of that year. A photograph of the occasion shows a comparatively large congregation.

The following year the annual church bazaar (including merry-go rounds for the children) was held in the then ample parish grounds to augment income for the parish. It was formally opened by the archbishop's wife. Some five years earlier the then incumbent sought permission from the St Kilda Council to use the council "small hall" for a jumble sale to aid the establishment of the free kindergarten.

Walter Green (incumbent 1942–1960) realised that it was unlikely that the original plans would come to pass and accordingly, in the late 1950s, he decided to extend the 1915 nave by building the present sanctuary and vicarage together with an ambulatory leading into a lady chapel made possible by extending the former nursery school building. A sacristy, incense room, vestry and oratory were also built and the interior brickwork of the church was rendered and painted.

In the early 1960s, during the incumbency of Harry Reynolds Smythe, the present narthex and porch were added, as was the porch and the Walsingham Shrine of the lady chapel. The narthices of both the church and chapel are of a somewhat post-modern style (before its time) as opposed to the Gothic sympathy of the original 1915 building.

The four smaller windows of the 1915 building on the liturgical north wall have been replaced with three "sea" windows; the last window was not replaced to accommodate the chamber organ.

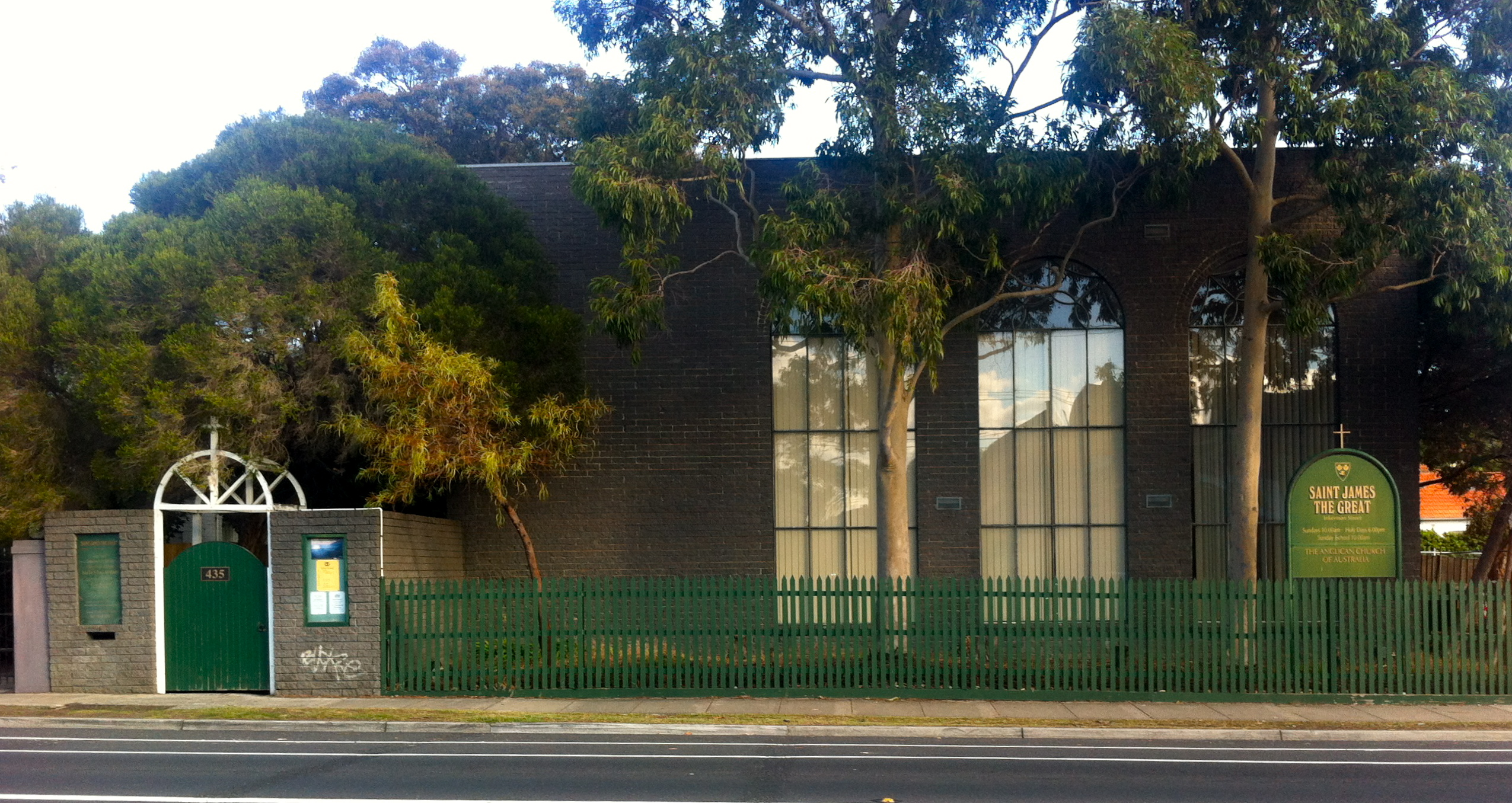
St James' from Inkerman Street

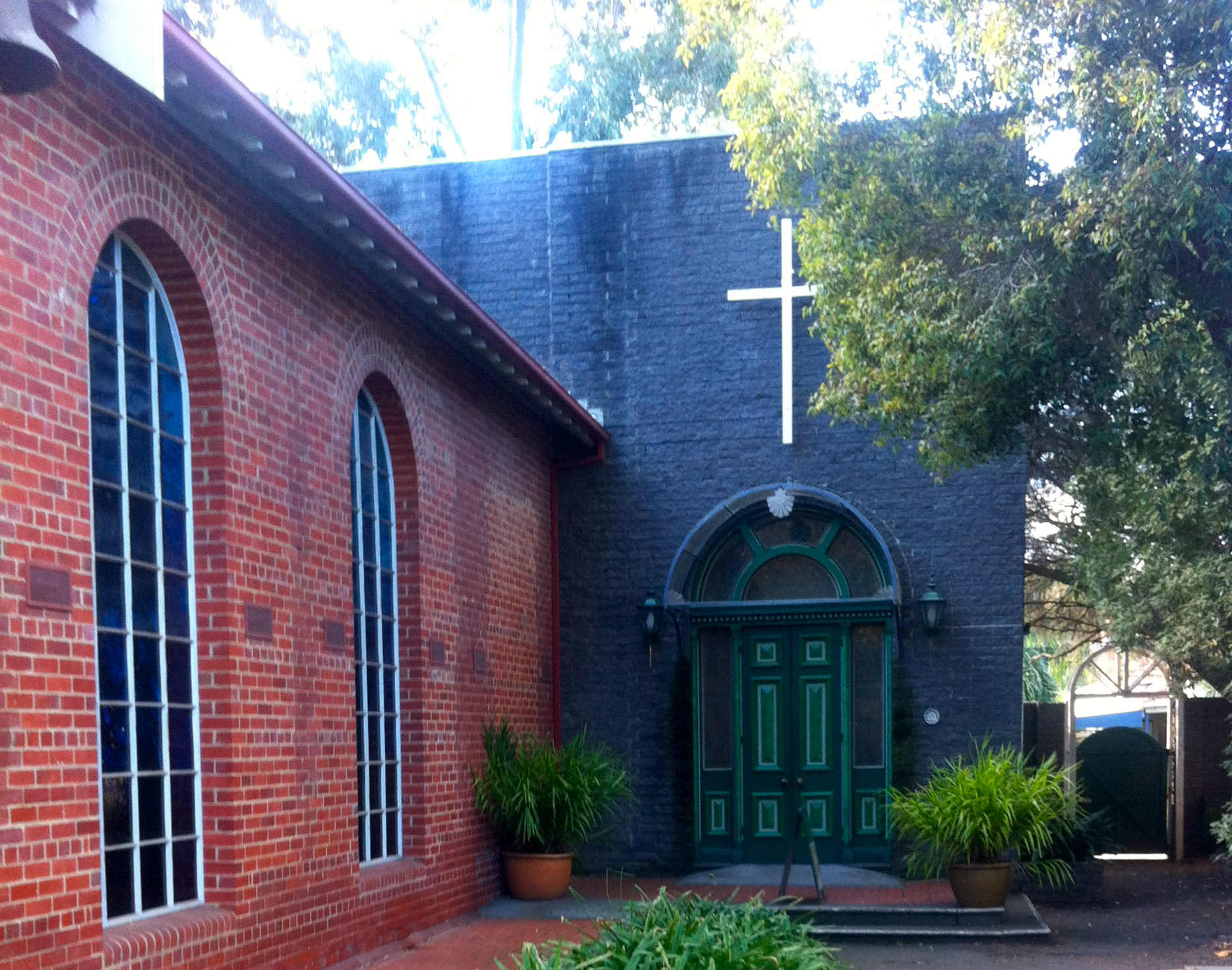
Restored Victorian "west door" entrance

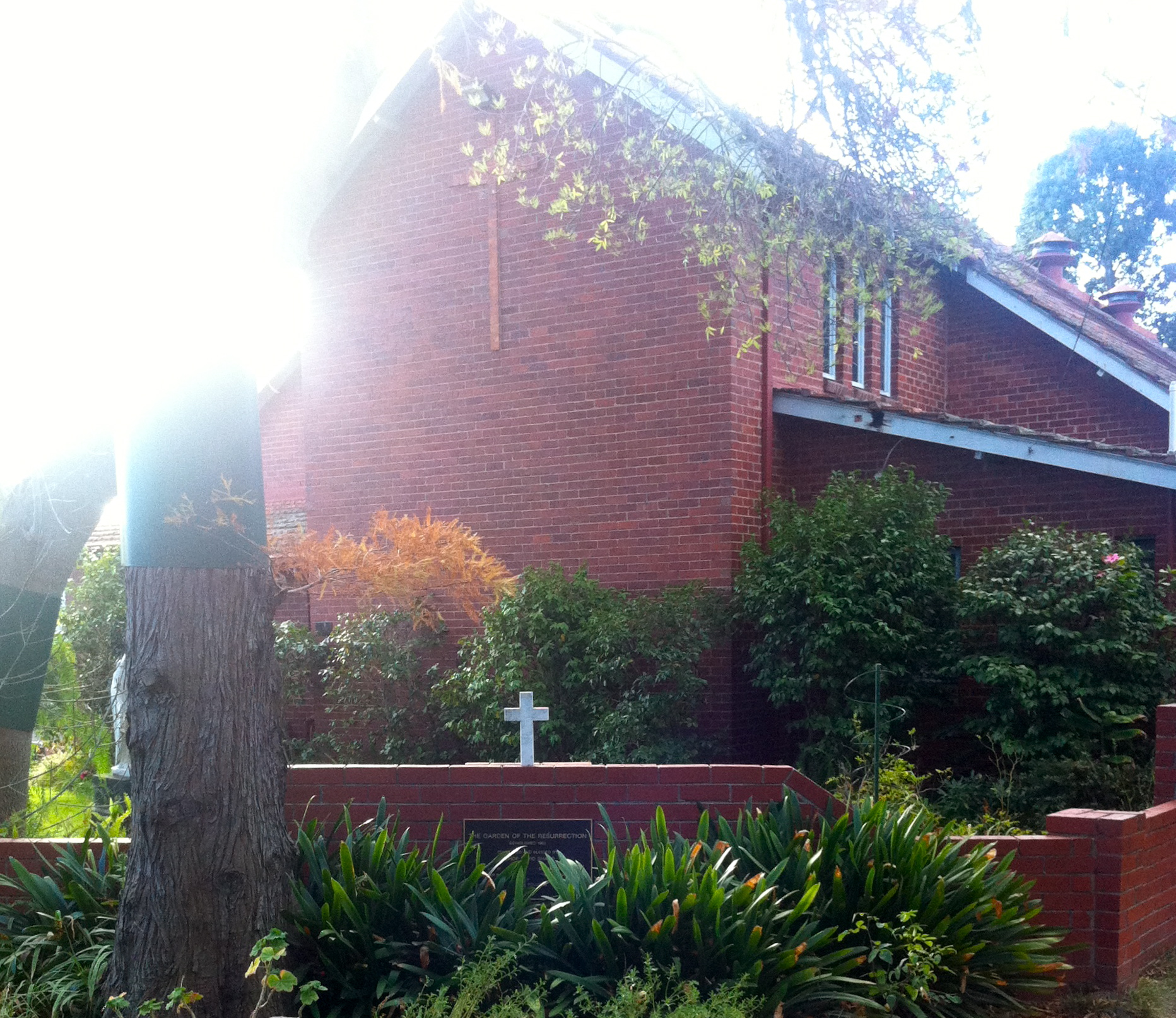
Garden of the Resurrection for the ashes of the dead

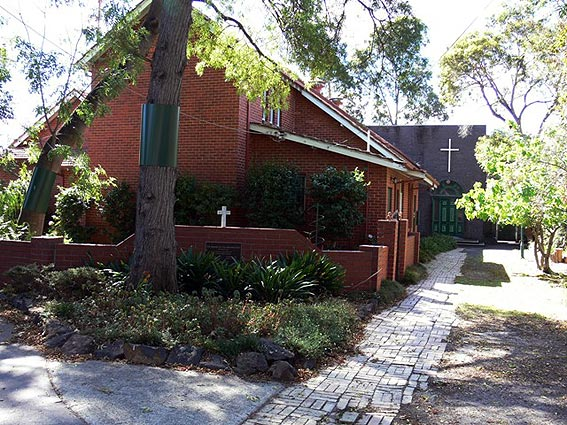
Liturgical east end and Garden of the Resurrection

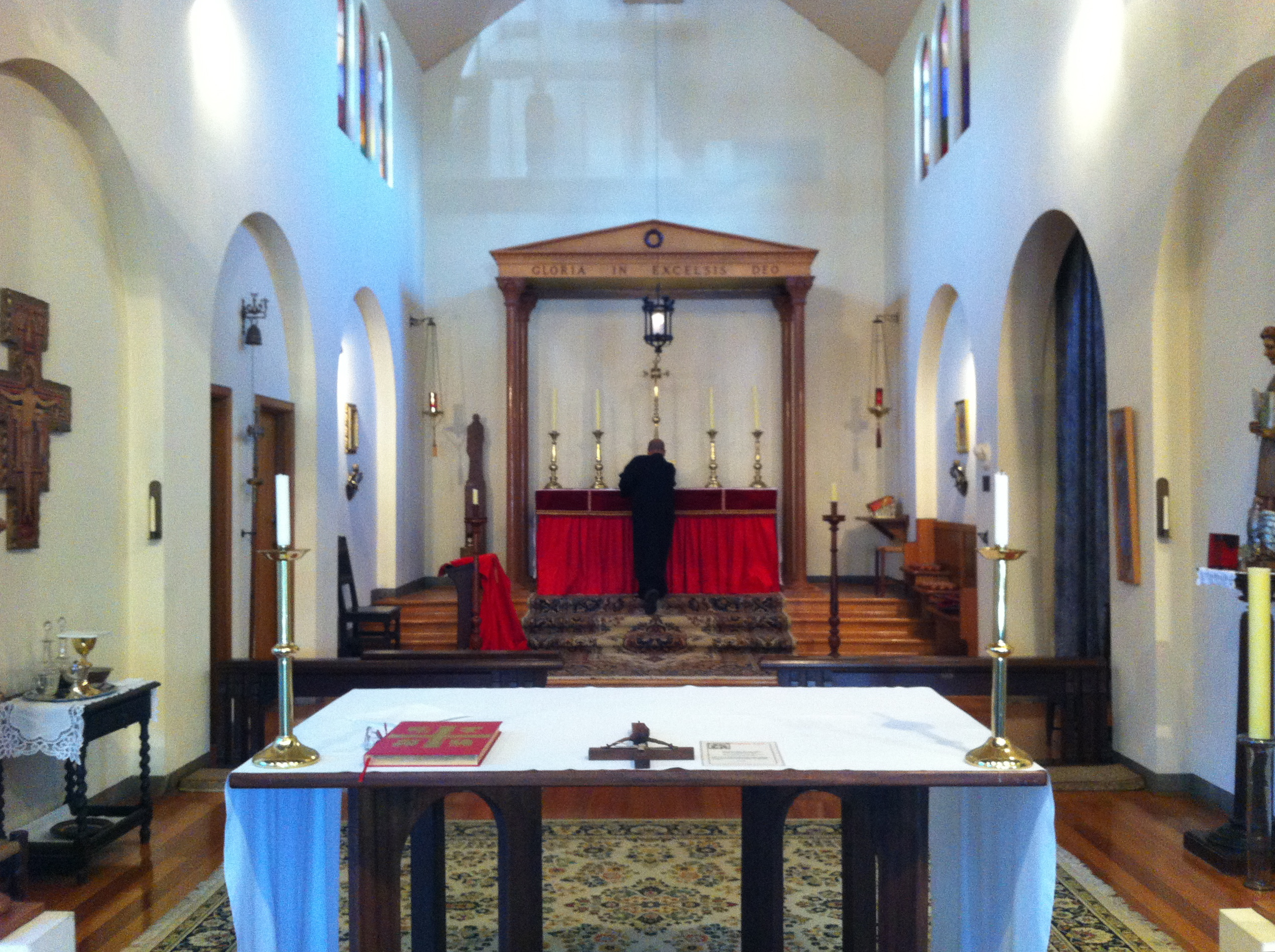
Sanctuary and nave altar, Pentecost 2013

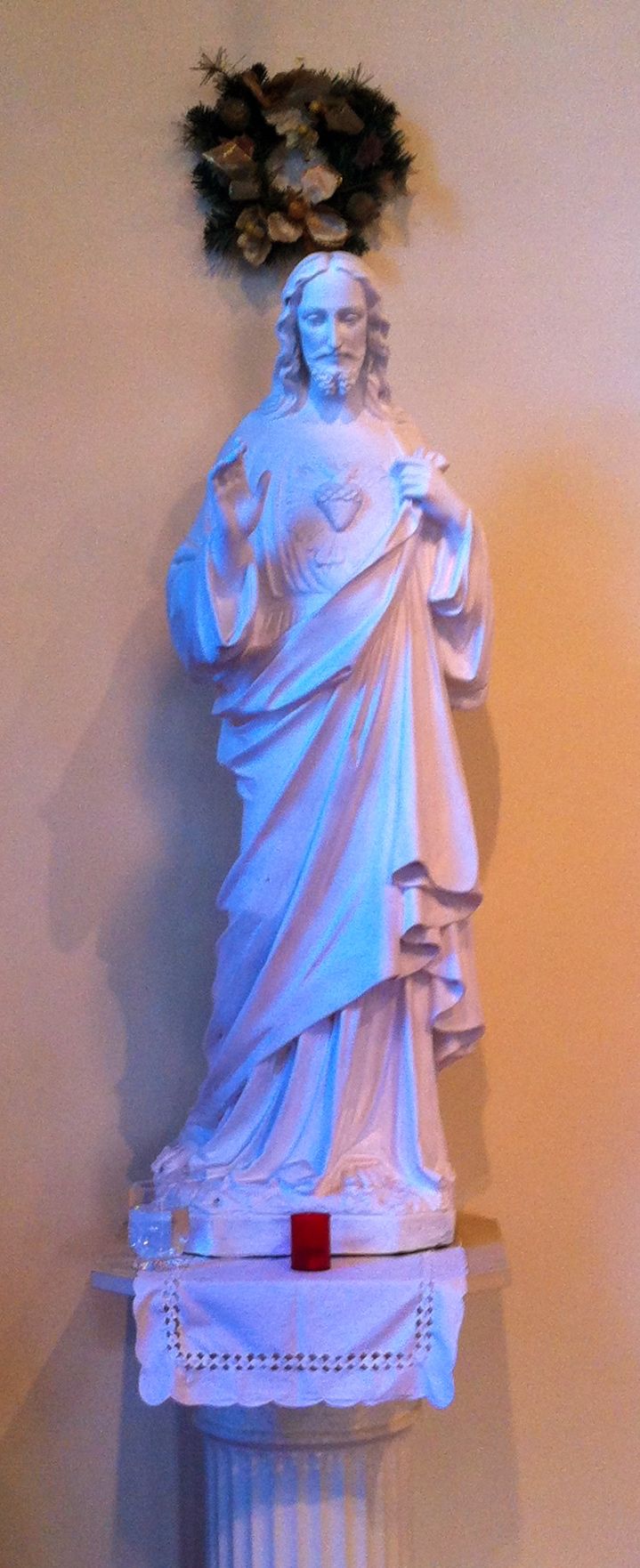
Statue of the Sacred Heart of Jesus on the epistle side of the chancel

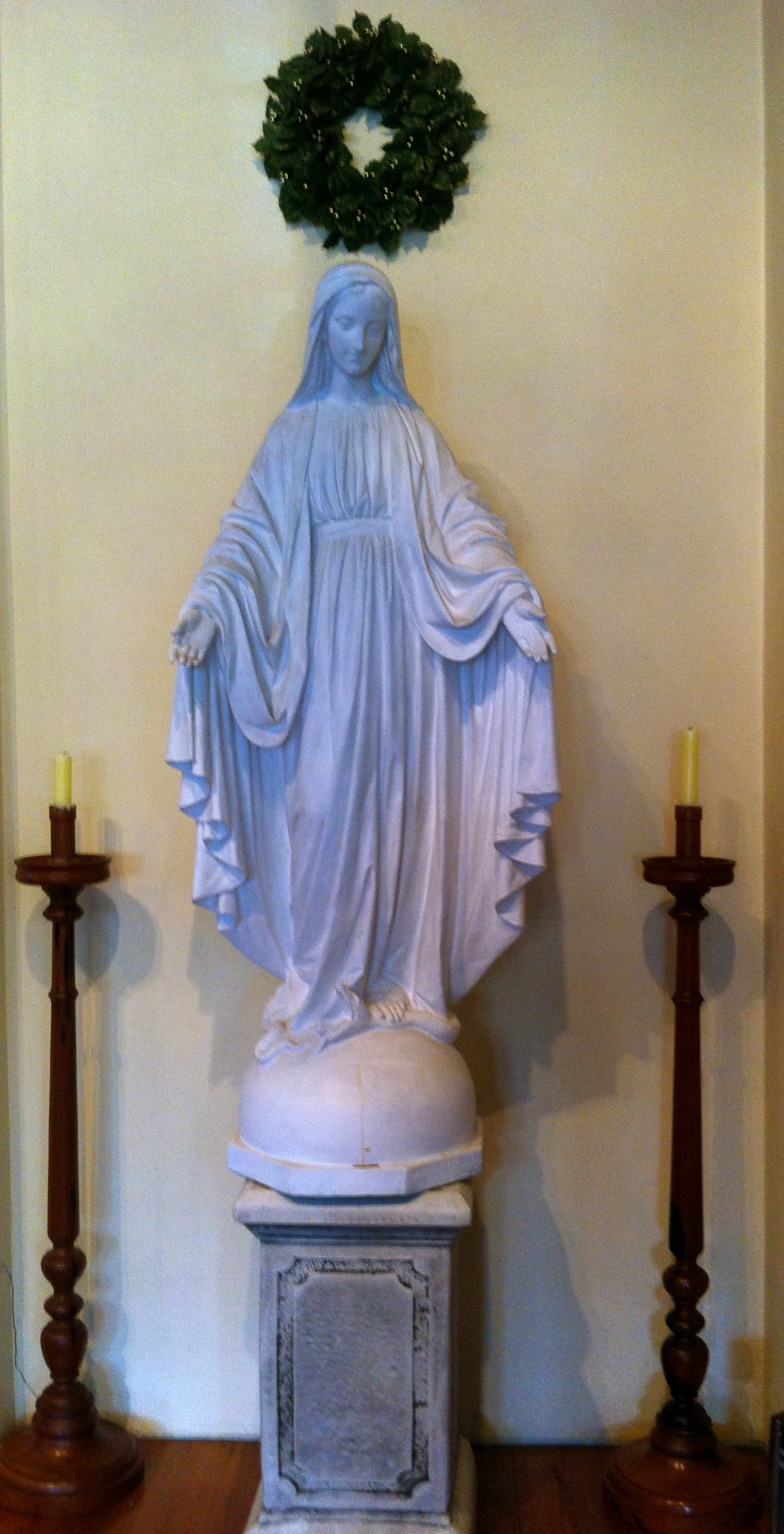
Statue of the Blessed Virgin Mary on the gospel side of the chancel

The corner frontage (Alexandra Street and Inkerman Street) of the property (approximately half an acre or 0.2 hectares) was leased to an oil company and a service station was built. Whilst this provided a significant income for the parish for some fifty years, the service station eventually closed at the end of 2008 and the site remained vacant for five years, resulting in financial hardship for the parish. Despite protest by the vicar and the wardens the corner site was sold by the diocese in 2011. In 2013 a three-storey apartment building was constructed on the site.

=== Windows ===
Many of the stained glass windows in St James the Great are the unique work of Czech-Australian artist Miroslav Dismas Zika. The windows are examples of hagiography and illustrative of Christian teachings. The three blue windows on the liturgical south wall represent the ocean on which the ark of the church bears its members to salvation. The lady chapel has nine clerestory windows on the western wall (the liturgical north), depicting the story of salvation from the creation to the revelation of Jesus and his death and resurrection. The theme continues as at the liturgical west end of the chapel where two antique streaky amber stained glass windows frame Zika's interpretation of the Heavenly Jerusalem – the reward of the faithful.

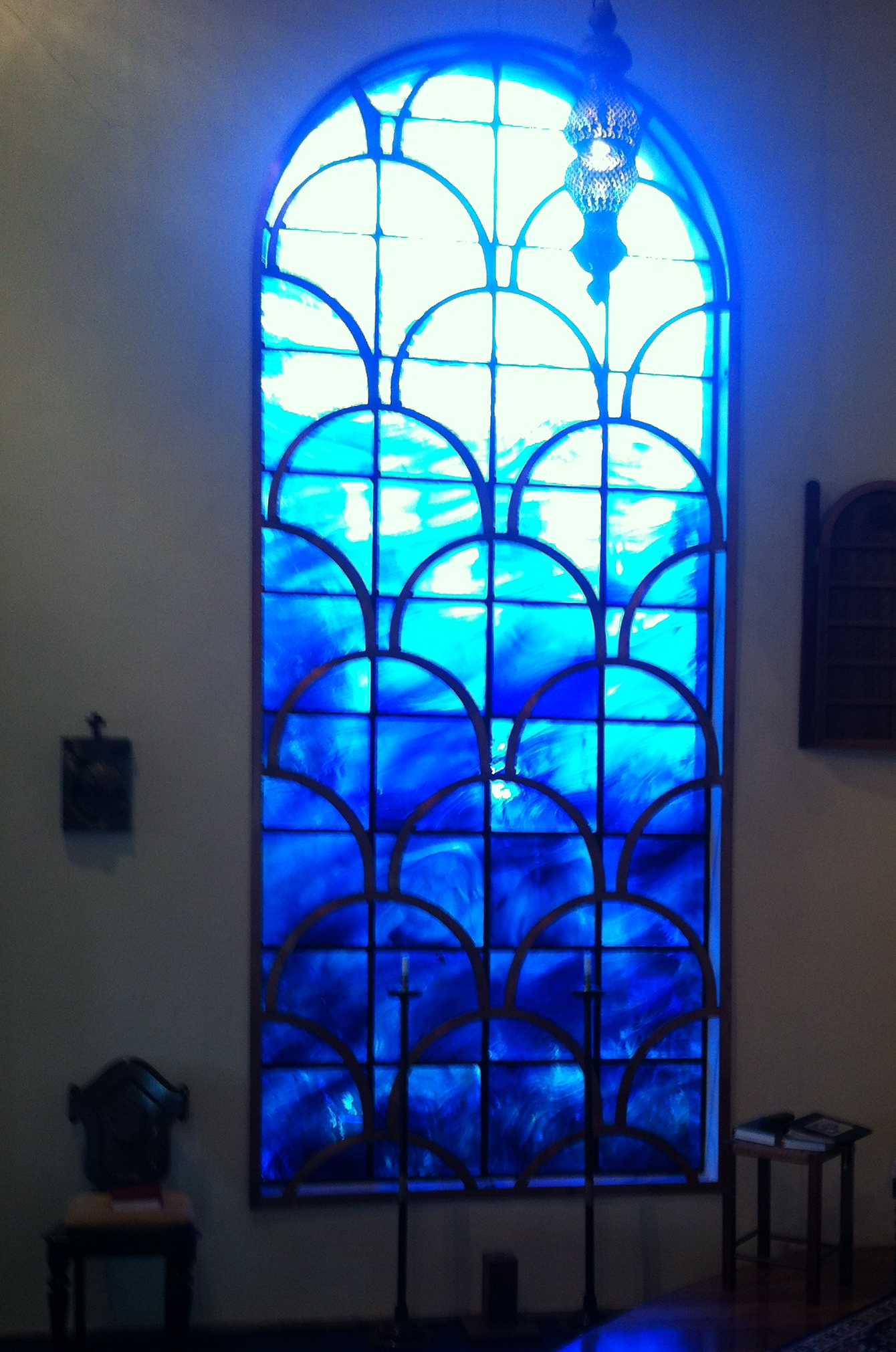
Sea windows

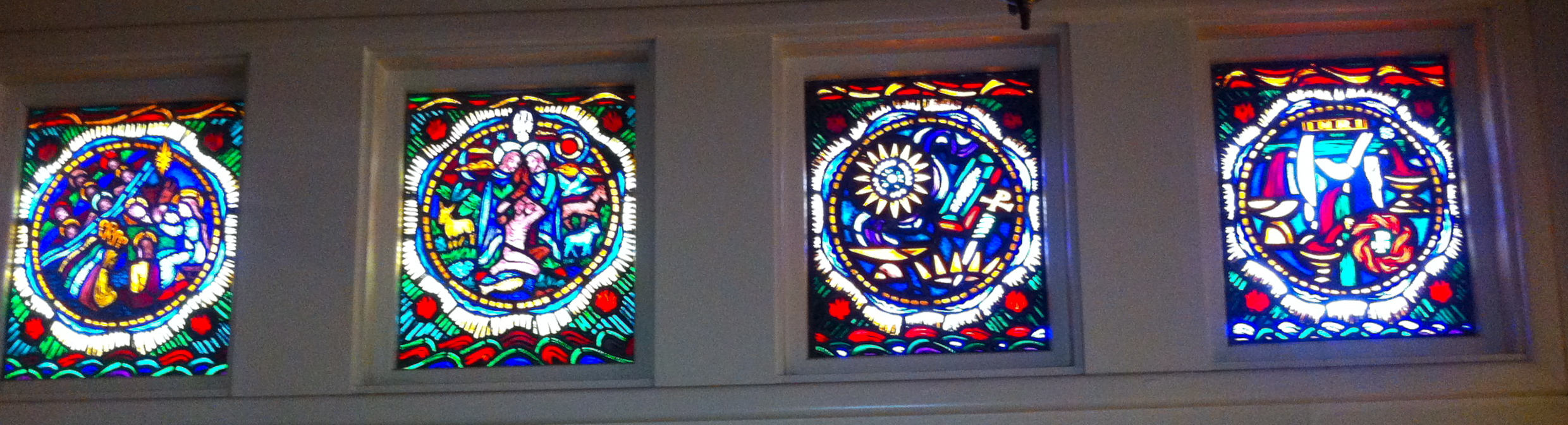
Clerestory windows

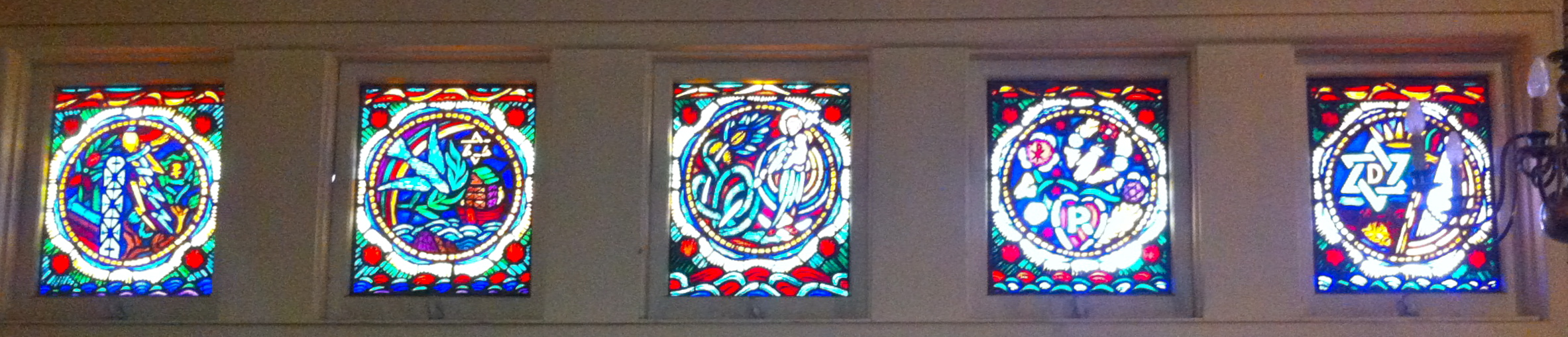
Clerestory windows

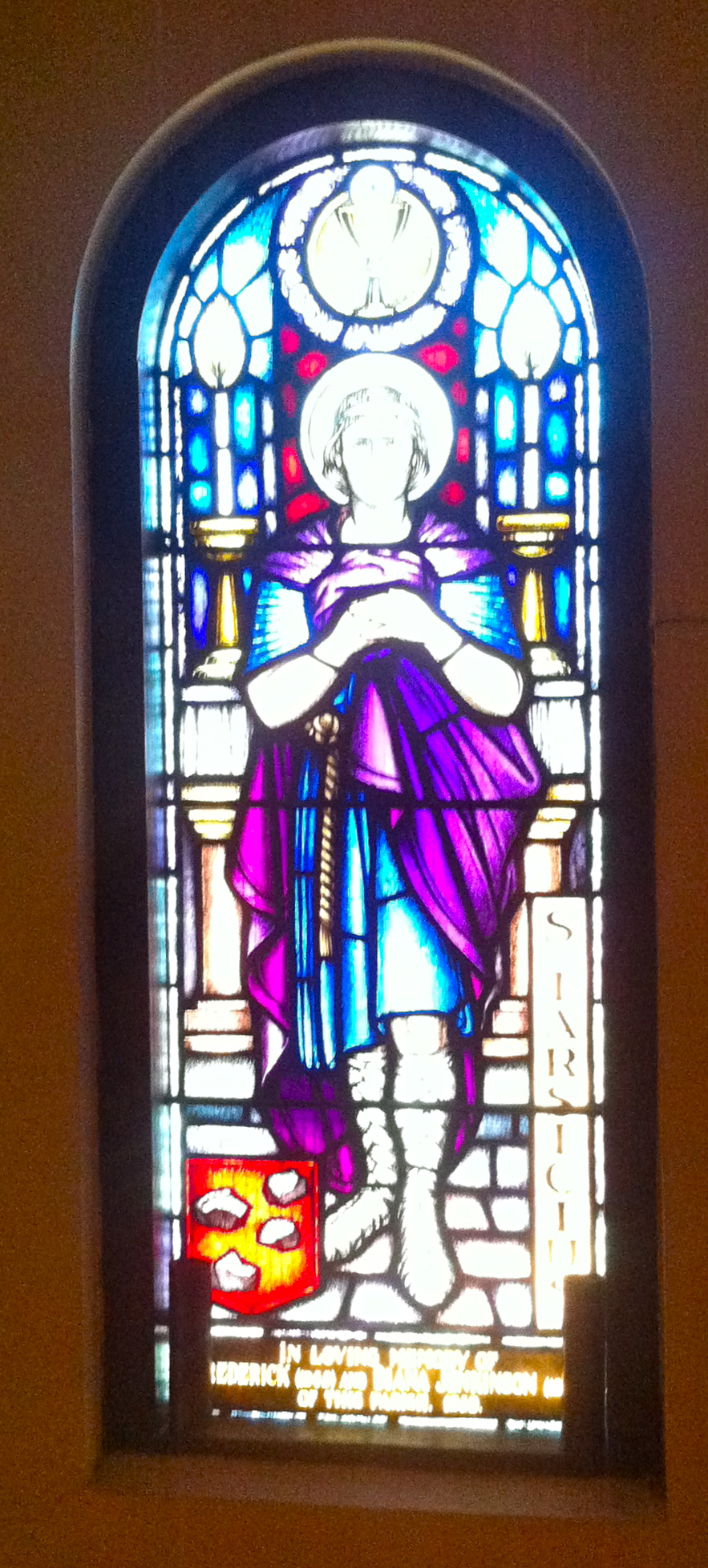
St Tarcisius window in the Lady Chapel apse

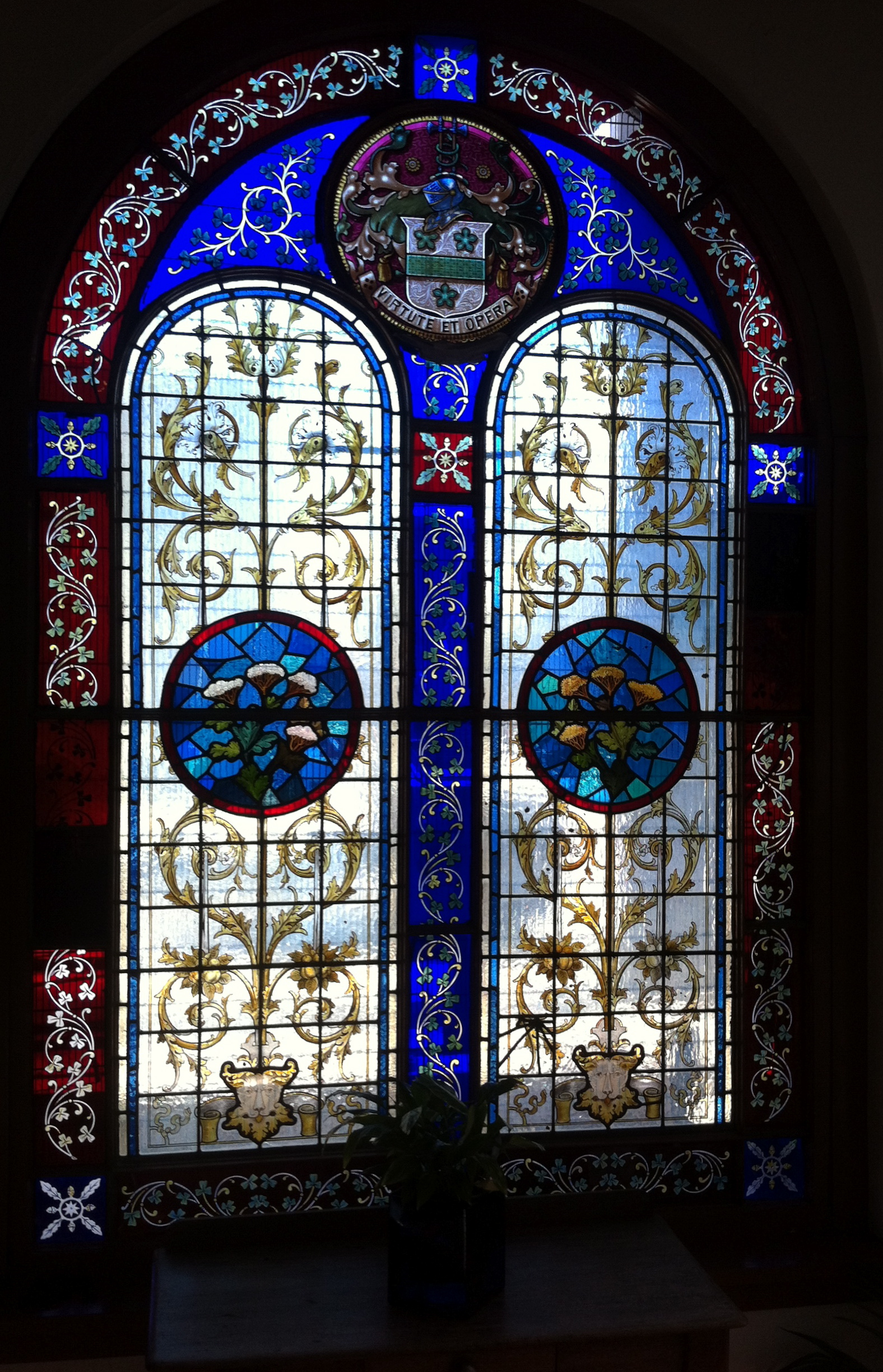
Lady Chapel porch window from the Caulfield mansion which was the home of Australia's fifth prime minister, Andrew Fisher

=== Epiphany window controversy ===
The Epiphany window was created by the artist Miroslav Dismas Zika and blessed by the coadjutor bishop in February 1967. Most of Zika's works were predominantly for Roman Catholic churches, including Tarrawarra Abbey. Following medieval precedent, he dated his work by a significant event of the day, namely the hanging of Ronald Ryan. He etched a Latin inscription into the glass near the base of the window which can be translated as "Dismas made this in 1967 at the beginning of the month when Bolte, scandalous, arrogant, was demanding Ryan suffer capital punishment."

"Bolte", the then Premier of Victoria, Sir Henry Bolte, considered this objectionable. A front-page article in The Age on 4 May 1967 reported that, in response to Bolte's protests, Frank Woods, Anglican Archbishop of Melbourne, had apologised by letter to the premier, clarifying that the inscription had neither been included in the original design brief nor had any "official authorisation". The article went on to say that the offending words had been erased, although the vicar, Harry Smythe (1923–2005), refused to confirm just how this had been done. Zika remained unrepentant. There are various theories as to how the inscription was hidden including the rubbing of a burnt cork over the offending words or similarly the covering of the etched inscription using a soft lead pencil. Cleaning of the window over the years has revealed the inscription – the "removal" was achieved in 1967 by filling in the etching with a soft leaded pencil. Today, however, the Latin inscription is visible once again.

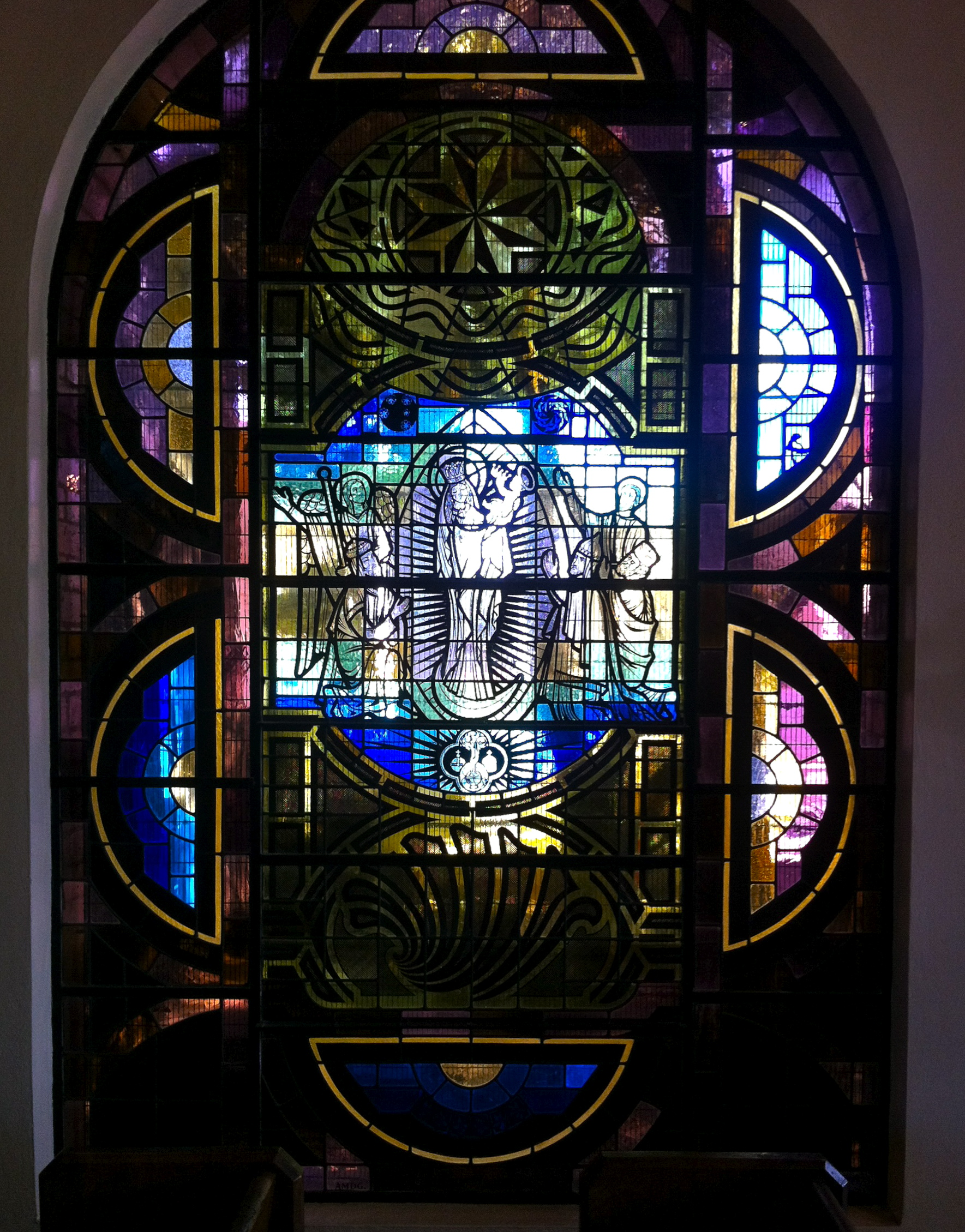
Epiphany window

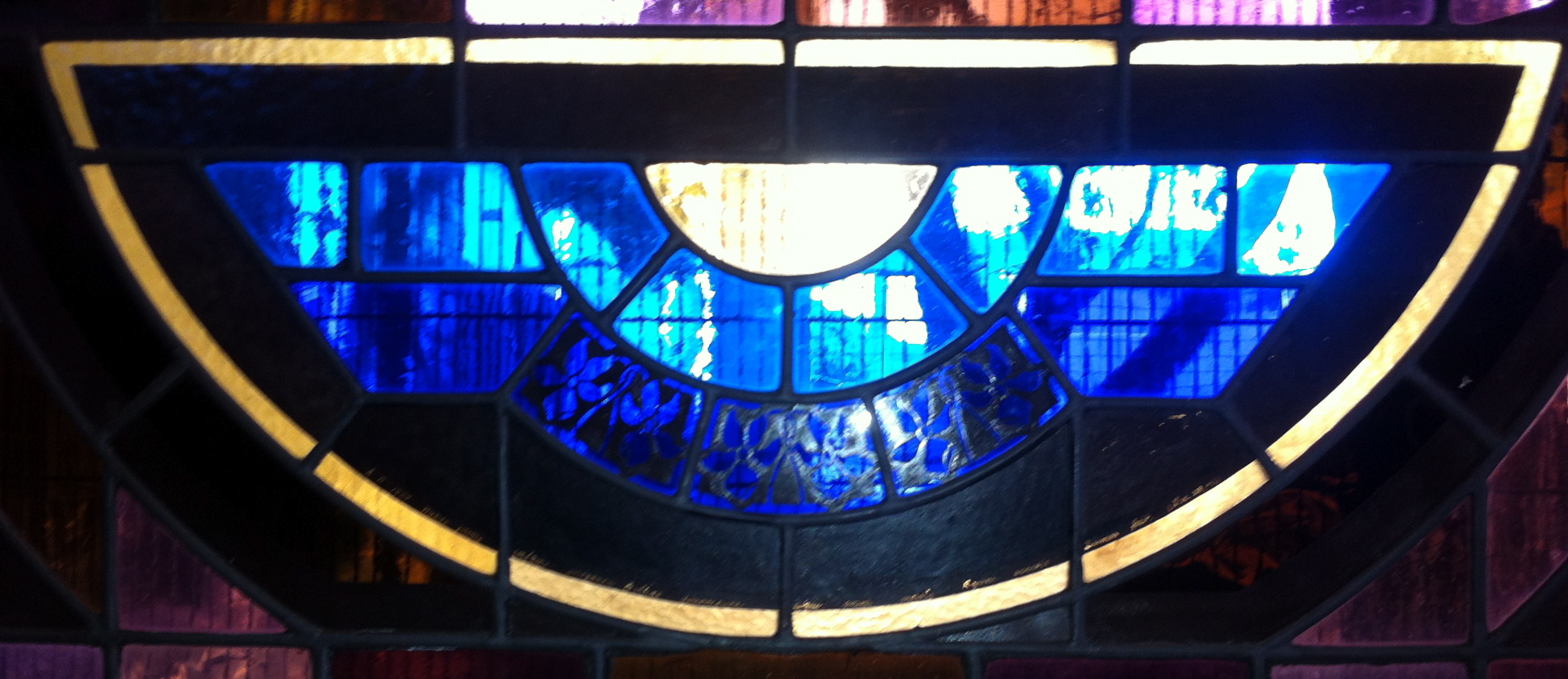
Epiphany window inscription

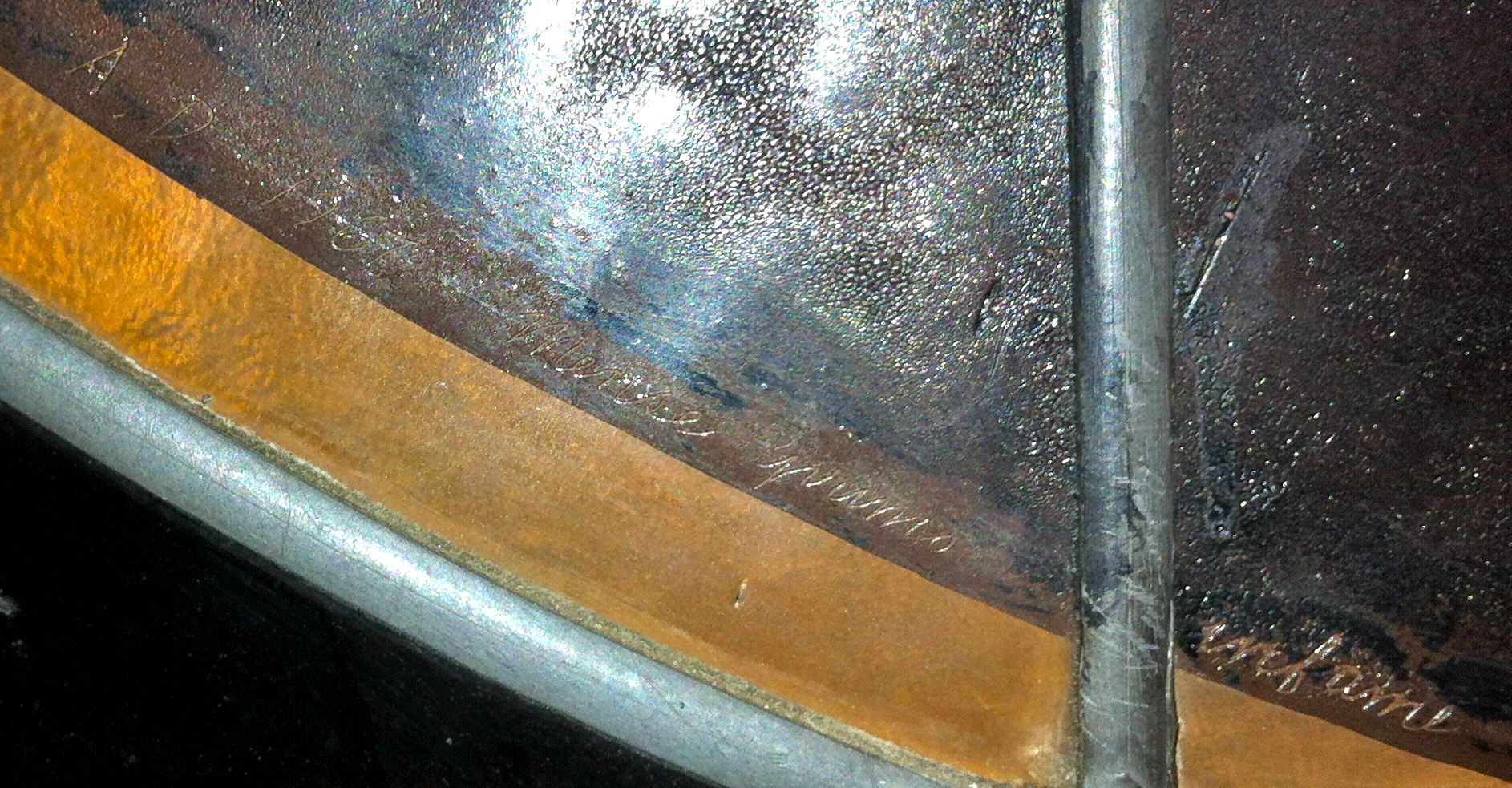
Epiphany window inscription in detail

== Present ==
=== Music ===
Sunday Masses at the church are conducted in English except for the Kyrie eleison which alternates between Greek and English.

The modern rite of the Mass is performed at least three Sundays each month and features the Gloria, Sanctus and Benedictus from the 1969 "Parish congregational mass in honour of the unsung saints" by Australian composer Albert Edwin Lynch.

The Kyrie eleison, Sursum corda and the Acclamation after the Consecration (The Mystery of Faith) are in plainchant.

The Agnus Dei is from the 1971 "A Community Mass" by Richard Proulx.

The proper part of the Mass features a responsorial psalm in plainchant. The Gospel Acclamation (Alleluia and verse) is usually the triple alleluia chant in Mode VI. The service usually includes a Gradual hymn before the Gospel Acclamation, an Offertory hymn and a Post Communion / Dismissal hymn. Hymns are selected from the Australian Hymn Book.

Organ solos are usually played during the opening procession, communion and at the end of service.

The church has a team of cantors who sing the propers of the Mass each week and lead congregational singing. Occasional choirs and musicians participate in the liturgical music, particularly the Canterbury Singers who are informally based at St James’ and the Clerkes of St James who sing settings of the Mass on special occasions and feast days. The parish has a long association with Trio Con Brio (cello, oboe and flute) and other instrumentalists and musicians who enrich the music life of the congregation.

As of 2014, the church has two organs.

The chamber organ is registered with the National Trust. It was built in Tasmania by Samuel Joscelyne in the 1860s and installed in the church in 1988 replacing a chamber organ, made by John Smith of Bristol, which had been sold to St Matthew's Bega in New South Wales. The Joscelyne organ has one manual and an octave pedal board with a range from G2 – G3 (rather than the more customary C2- C3). John Maidment (2007), of the Organ Historical Trust of Australia, has said that the "instrument is of interest for its superlative casework in Australian cedar (Toona Australis) and its outstanding craftsmanship. The casework is one of the largest surviving examples of 19th century Australian furniture and is notable for the excellence of its design; it has a splendid cornice, decorated with carved paterae, carved central cresting with scroll motifs in contrary motion, raised case panels and four flats containing dummy wooden "flatback" pipes covered in gold leaf and backed in red silk; the centre of each opening is surmounted by a carved curving rococo-style motif. The sides of the console opening have fretted inset panels while the large brass nameplate simply has "Joscelyne" engraved in copperplate script."

In 2011 a "Johannus Opus 20" organ was purchased to complement the Jocelyne organ. It has a wider range of application than the chamber organ and a pedal board arrangement to which visiting organists are more accustomed.

The church has a Kawai studio grand piano, on permanent loan from one of the congregation. All three instruments are used in the church's liturgy.

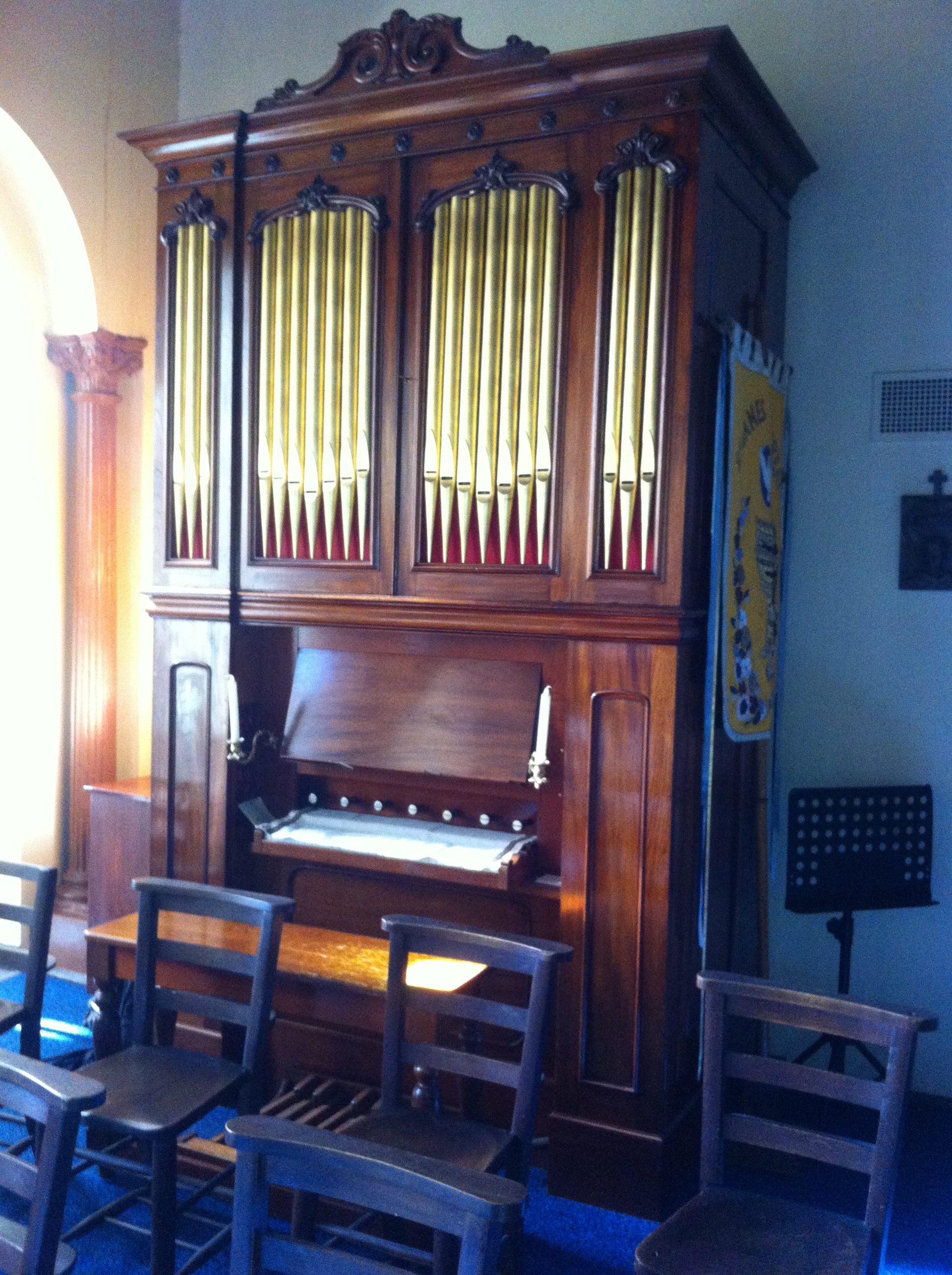
Historic Joscelyne organ

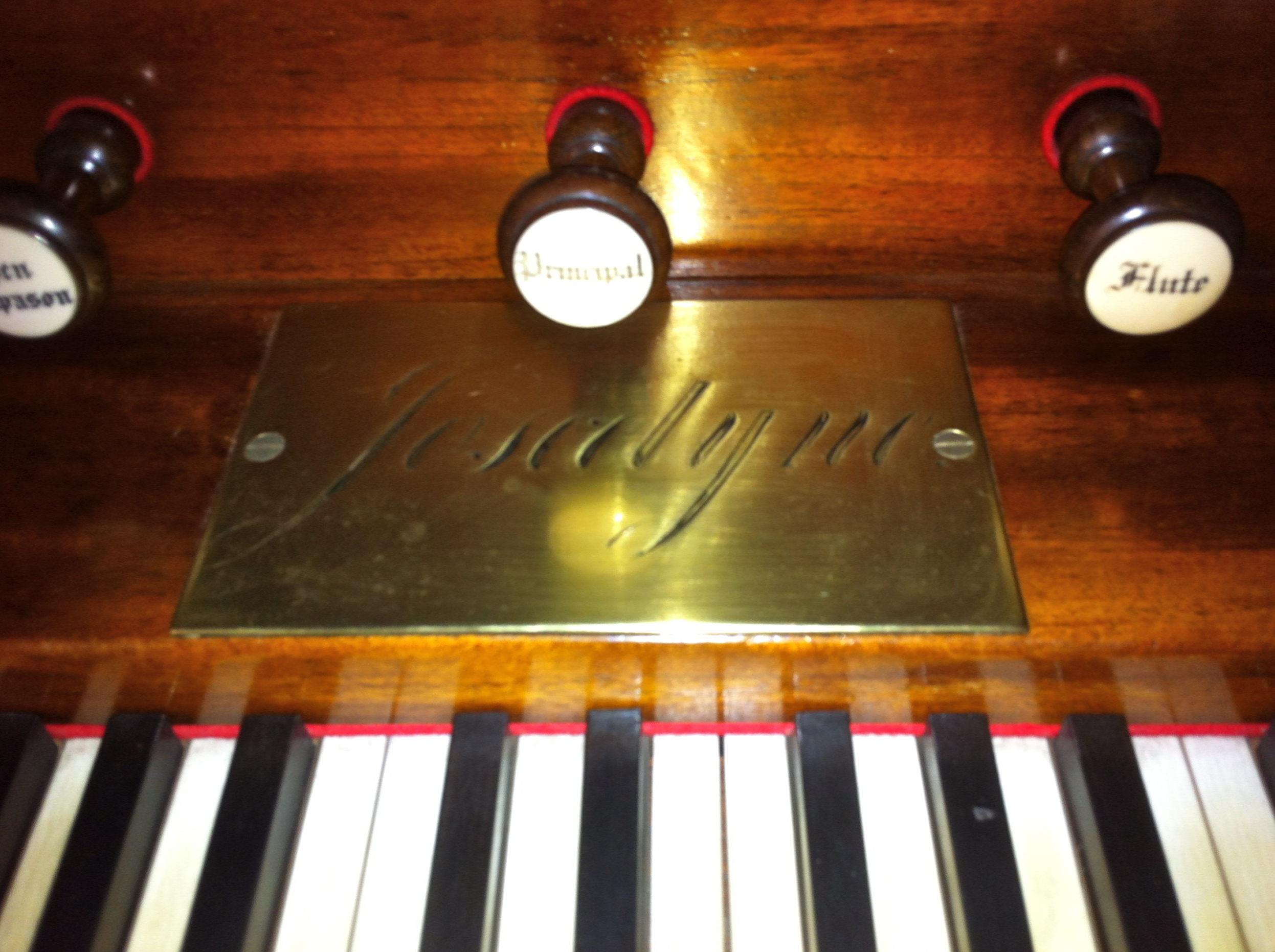
Brass inscription plate – the only one existing on the extant Joscelyn instruments

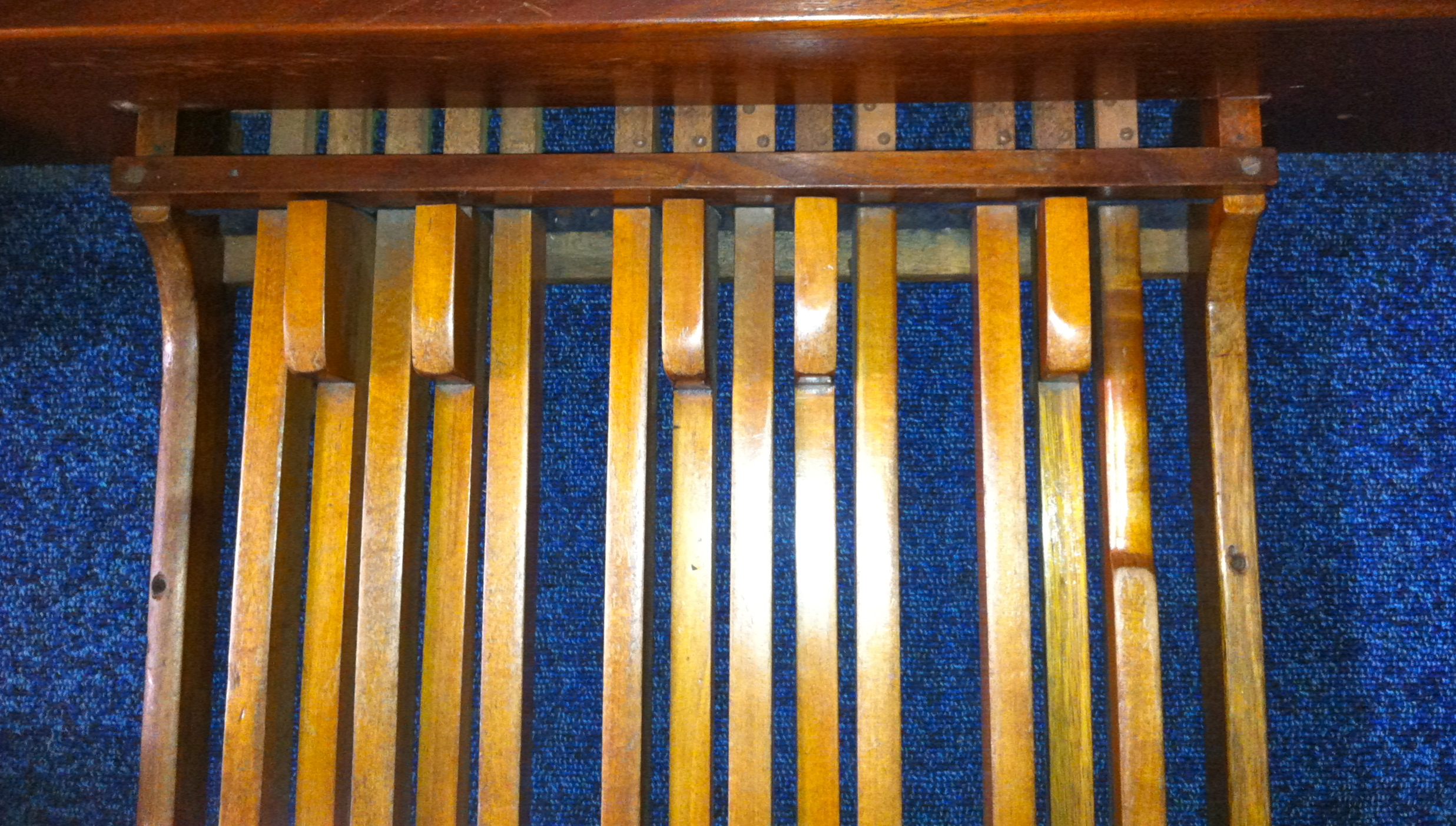
Pedal board – Octave G-G

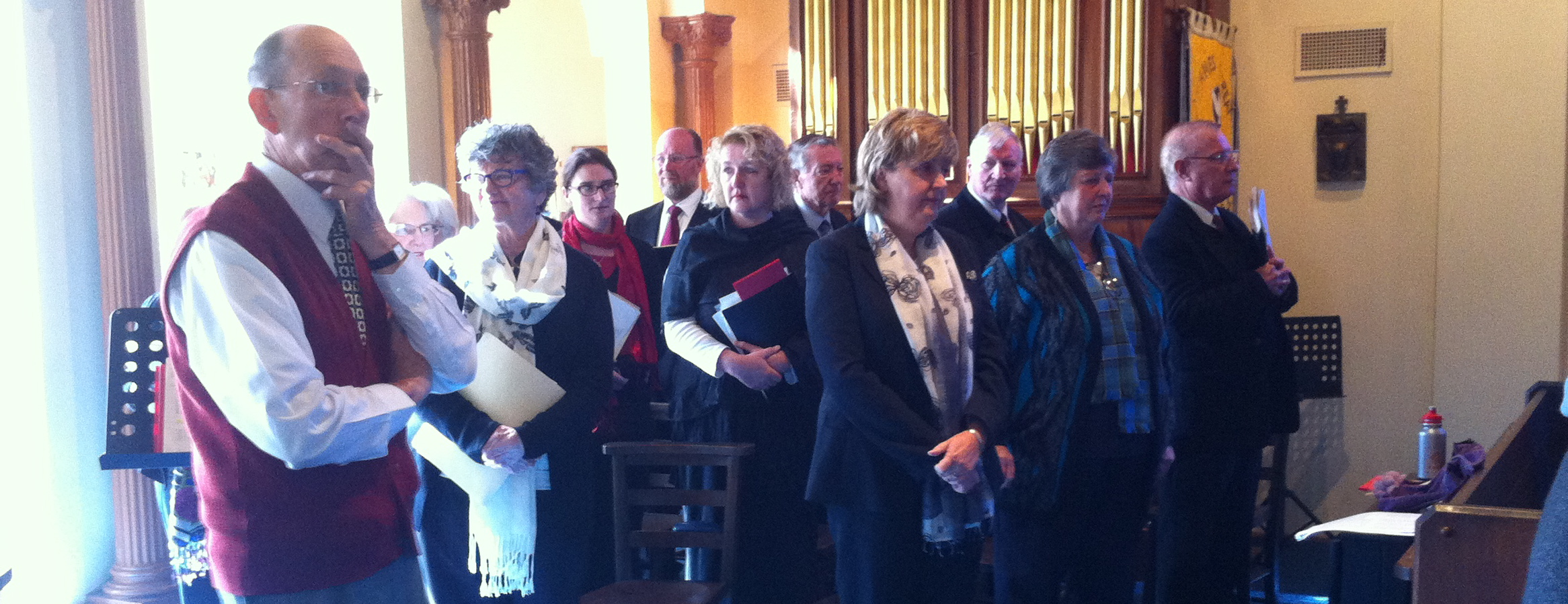
The Canterbury Singers directed by Keith Fullard (foreground) on Pentecost Sunday 2013

=== Annual blessing of the animals ===
Since 1993 the church has celebrated an annual blessing of animals service for St Francis's Day organised by Lorraine Hawkes, one of the parish leaders. For some years the patron of the day has been John-Michael Howson OAM.

=== Ministry to children ===
The parish has had a significant ministry to children, beginning with a "free kindergarten" dating from as early as 1918 until the 1990s. St James supported the 2nd East St Kilda scout troop in the years following the Great War. Since 2002 it has been host to the St Kilda Steiner Pre-School which aims that "children (will) take part in a mixed-age, play-based curriculum in a nurturing environment where learning is by imitation rather than direction".

=== Childcare ===
A decision by the wardens resulted in St James' House being let to a childcare organisation, Little Patch Early Learning Centre. This is in keeping with the tradition of service to the community by the parish and is hoped will lead to increased financial viability of the parish.

== See also ==
- List of Anglo-Catholic churches
- Oratory of the Good Shepherd
