= St Kilda Artillery Orderly Room and Drill Hall =

- Location within Melbourne
- 37.8600°S 144.9924°E
- Location: 10 Chapel Street, St Kilda East, Victoria, Australia

Commonwealth Heritage List
- Official name: Artillery Orderly Room / Drill Hall
- Type: Listed place (Historic)
- Designated: 22 June 2004
- Reference no.: 105175

St Kilda Artillery Orderly Room and Drill Hall is a heritage-listed military installation at 10 Chapel Street, St Kilda East, Victoria, Australia. It was added to the Australian Commonwealth Heritage List on 22 June 2004.

== Description ==
As with all orderly rooms built at this time, the St Kilda East building is of weatherboard construction with corrugated iron roofs. The roof is mainly gabled over the main building, with skillions over rear office areas, and a hipped roof end at the north west of the building. Windows are a combination of double-hung twelve-pane sashes, and casements. Doors are four-panel solid timber, and there are roller doors on the southern side. Porches, gables, window surrounds, a string course connecting window heads on the main facade, and the massing of the structure provide the visual interest to what is otherwise a large, plain building. The closely linked group of three upper windows on the main facade is unusual. There are vents to the gable facades. Unlike the other orderly rooms built in the 1880s, with the exception of Carlton (1888), St Kilda has metal roof trusses allowing a wider roof span and hence hall width. The original side wings are slightly different to each other, avoiding a monotonous rigid symmetry.

The other buildings include the 1889 residence which is weatherboard with a hipped and gabled roof, 1935 brick offices/classrooms, 1935 brick garages, a c. Second World War store clad with asbestos-cement sheeting, a small garden store, a small brick flammable store, an early 1900s store clad with weatherboards, an iron-clad store, and a 1915 store/toilet clad with weatherboards.

The orderly room/drill hall is one of 439 such buildings erected in Australia. Of these, 142 are known to survive, and of these 46 are in Victoria. Some others built around the time of St Kilda are as follows. Fort Queenscliff, 1882–83, is more modest. East Melbourne and Richmond, 1860s, were later added to. Ballarat's, like St Kilda's, is large. Bendigo, built 1880s, is now substantially altered. Castlemaine, 1889, is similar to St Kilda. Geelong, 1899, is more decorative. Kyneton, built 1903, is restrained and austere.

The St Kilda building is the largest surviving nineteenth century timber drill hall in metropolitan Melbourne and is a very good example of its type. It also helps to illustrate the function of a militia field artillery drill hall of the late nineteenth century. Whereas regular forces had parade grounds, citizen forces had to train mainly at night and needed shelter and light. The place is distinctive too for the unusual attached gun park.

The building is part of a group of important churches and other buildings in a significant urban area, and thus it contributes to the local streetscape.

=== Condition ===
The main building and outbuildings are apparently externally intact and in good condition, except that the gable timber decoration has been lost. The building may have been painted relatively recently. (July 2002)

== Heritage listing ==
The Artillery Orderly Room/Drill Hall, dating from 1889, is historically significant. It is associated with the development of military forces in Victoria during the nineteenth century, the Sargood reforms in Victoria during the 1880s and the evolution of paid citizen forces, and the long period following Commonwealth assumption of responsibility for defence matters.

The building helps to reflect the experience of citizen forces. Whereas regular personnel had parade grounds, citizen forces had to train mainly at night and required large, covered spaces providing shelter and light. Consequently, the building illustrates the function of a militia field artillery orderly room/drill hall of the late nineteenth century.

The building is the largest surviving nineteenth century timber drill hall in metropolitan Melbourne, and is significant as a representative example of a large scale building of this type. While the structure has a strong functional character, the design is brought alive by decorative window and door treatments, the string course to the main facade and the unusual linked group of upper windows, as well as the gabled extension. The metal roof trusses set it apart from many of its contemporaries, as does the attached gun park.

Further significance is added through the association with Sir Frederick Thomas Sargood. Sargood rose from a volunteer private to become a commanding officer, but more importantly he was Victoria's first Defence Minister and he introduced reforms significant to the colony's defence reorganisation. He played a range of roles in Victorian politics, and was later elected to the first Commonwealth Senate in 1901.

The Drill Hall is located in a precinct of churches and other notable buildings and it contributes to the streetscape of this significant part of Melbourne.
