= All Saints' Anglican Church, St Kilda East =

Church in Melbourne, Victoria, Australia

Coordinates: 37.8586°S 144.9927°E

All Saints' Anglican Church St Kilda East
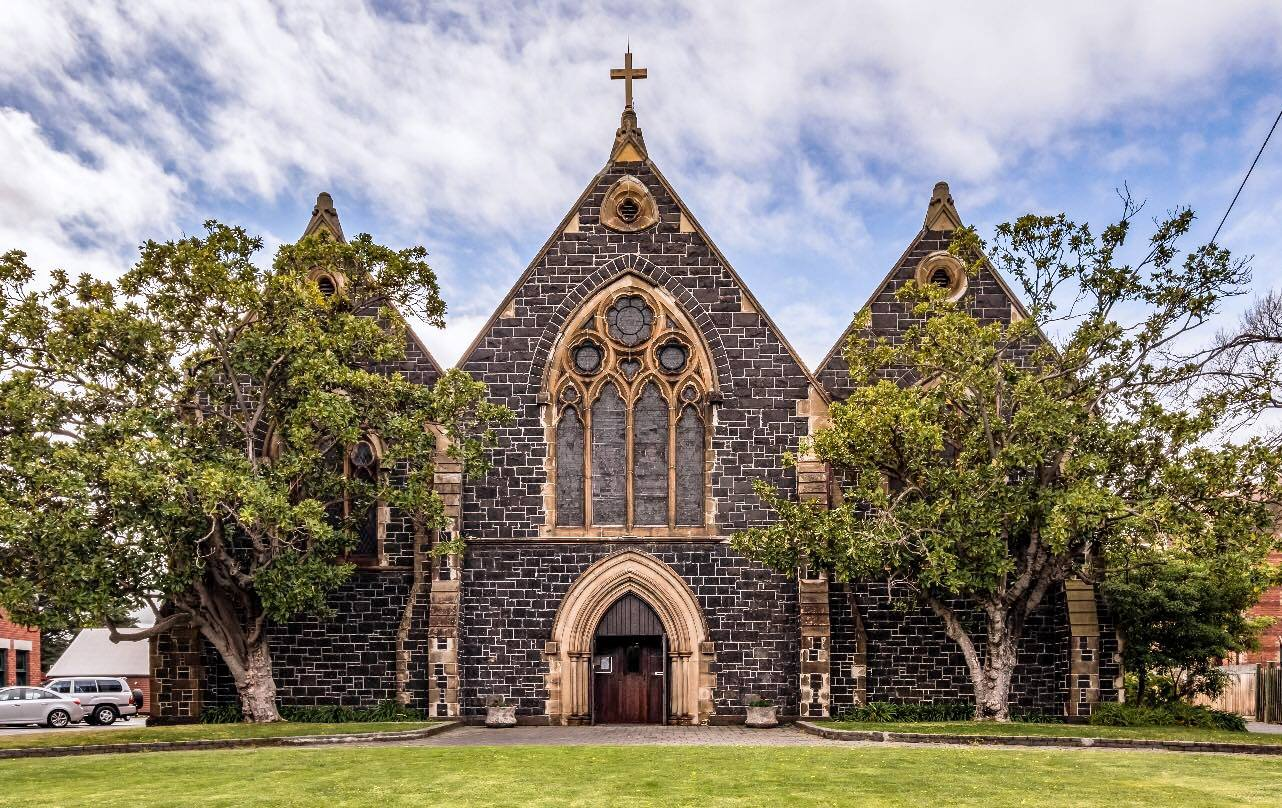
- All Saints' Anglican Church; St Kilda East
- Location: St Kilda, Victoria
- Country: Australia
- Denomination: Anglican Church of Australia
- Churchmanship: Anglo-Catholic
- Website: allsaints.org.au

History
- Founded: 1861

Architecture
- Architect: Nathaniel Billing
- Style: Gothic

Specifications
- Capacity: 1400

Administration
- Province: Victoria
- Diocese: Melbourne

Clergy
- Vicar: René Knaap

All Saints' Church, St Kilda East, is an historic Anglican church within the Anglo-Catholic tradition, located in St Kilda, Victoria, Australia. Although it advertises itself to be in St Kilda East (or East St Kilda), it is located just within the borders of the suburb of St Kilda. The church was initiated by the Reverend John Herbert Gregory in 1857, who would serve as its first vicar, and its foundation stone was laid in November 1858. Designed by architect Nathaniel Billing in the Gothic style, the church was officially opened on 8 December 1861.

The church is known as a fashionable venue for weddings and the Australian Dictionary of Biography lists numerous notable marriages.

== Architecture and interior ==
Billing, a pupil of Sir George Gilbert Scott, designed a long nave with side aisles. The church, built of bluestone with Tasmanian freestone dressings, is considered the largest Anglican parish church in the southern hemisphere, capable of seating up to 1400 people. Although the original plan for a 41-meter tower was never realised owing to financial constraints, All Saints' stands as a notable example of Gothic architecture.

Near the entrance of the church is the baptistry and a sandstone sculpture memorial to parishioners who parishioners who died in the conflicts of World War I and World War II. Along the walls of the nave and toward the north and south transepts are various stained glass windows depicting events in the life of Jesus Christ and many saints. One window depicts Judas Iscariot, possibly the only church window dedicated to him in Australia.

Known for its stencilled chancel decorations, the church features elaborate decorations, most notably in the sanctuary which hosts a marble altar. As with most Anglican churches built in the same period, the altar was designed to be the main focus of the church rather than the pulpit, intended for a more Catholic style of sacramentally-centred worship.

In the north transept next to the sanctuary is a lady chapel dedicated to the Virgin Mary used for weekday Masses. Inside the chapel is an oratory dedicated to Our Lady of Walsingham.

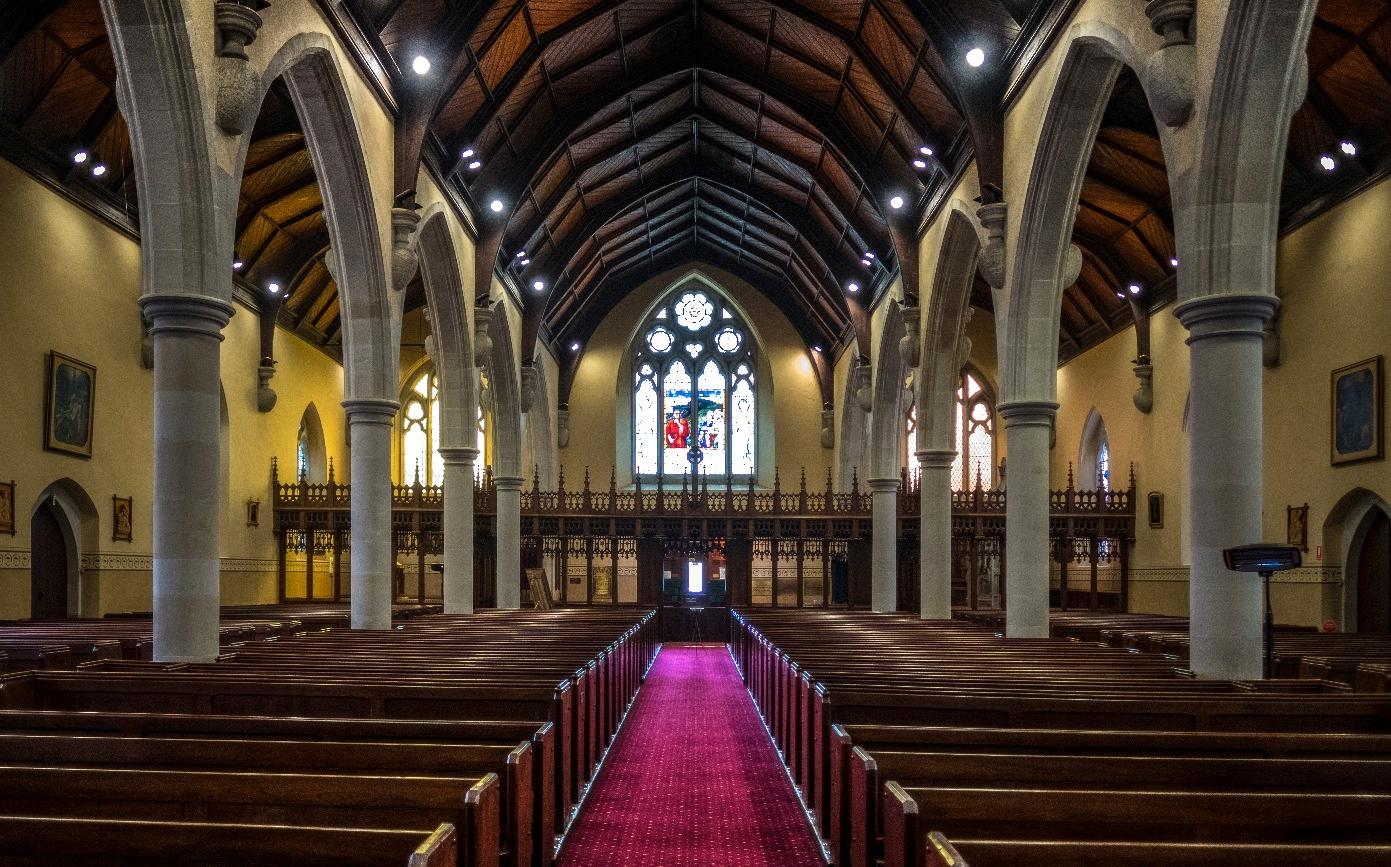
Nave

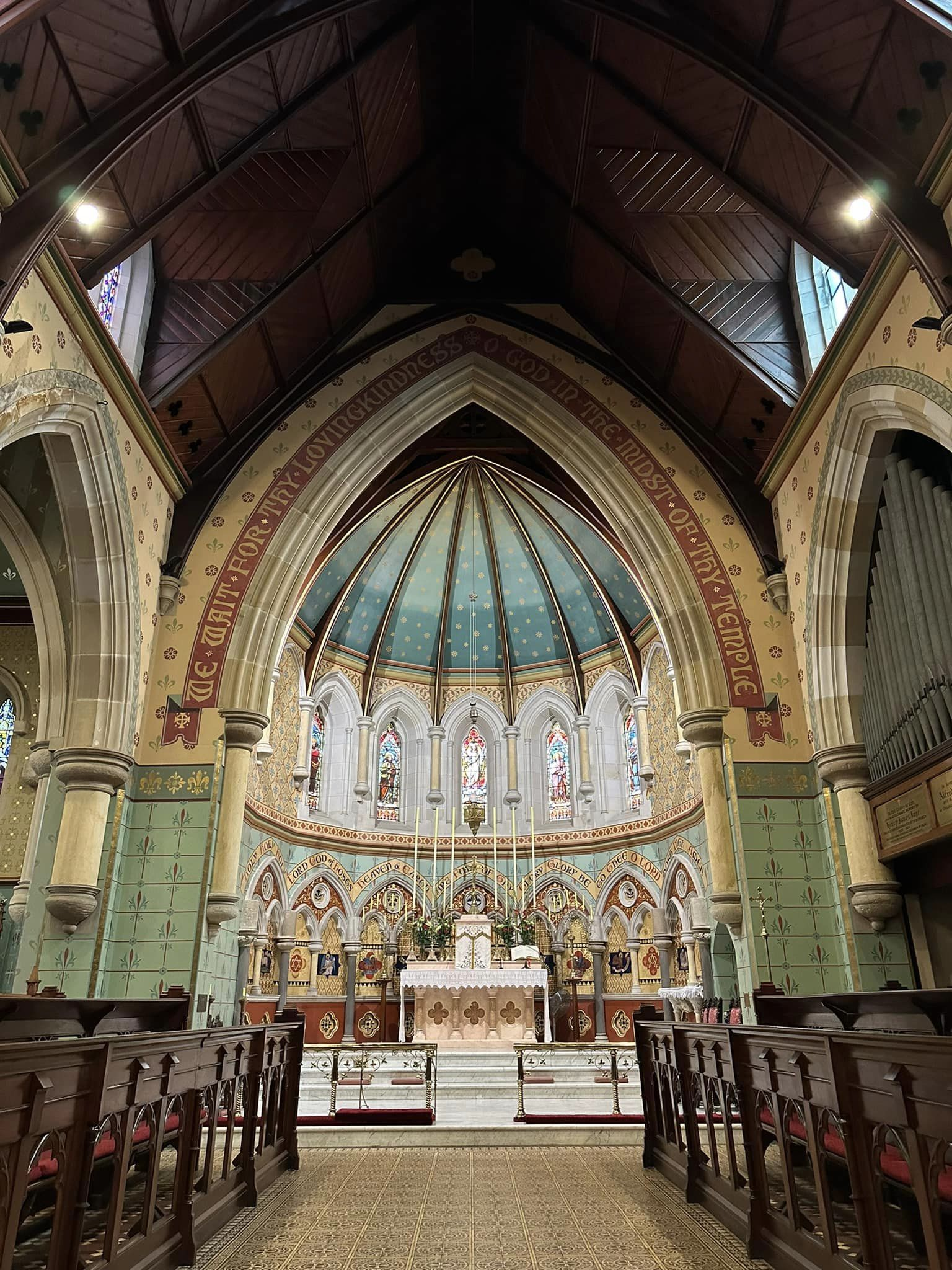
Chancel and sanctuary

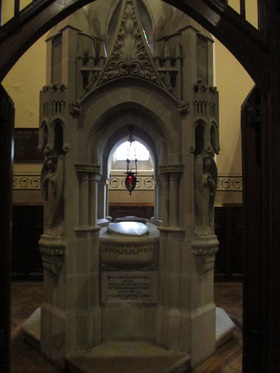
War memorial

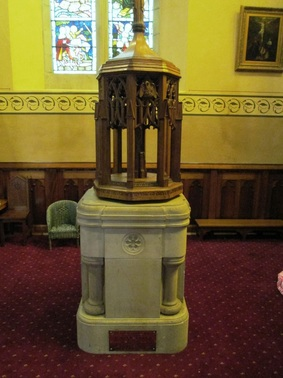
Baptistry

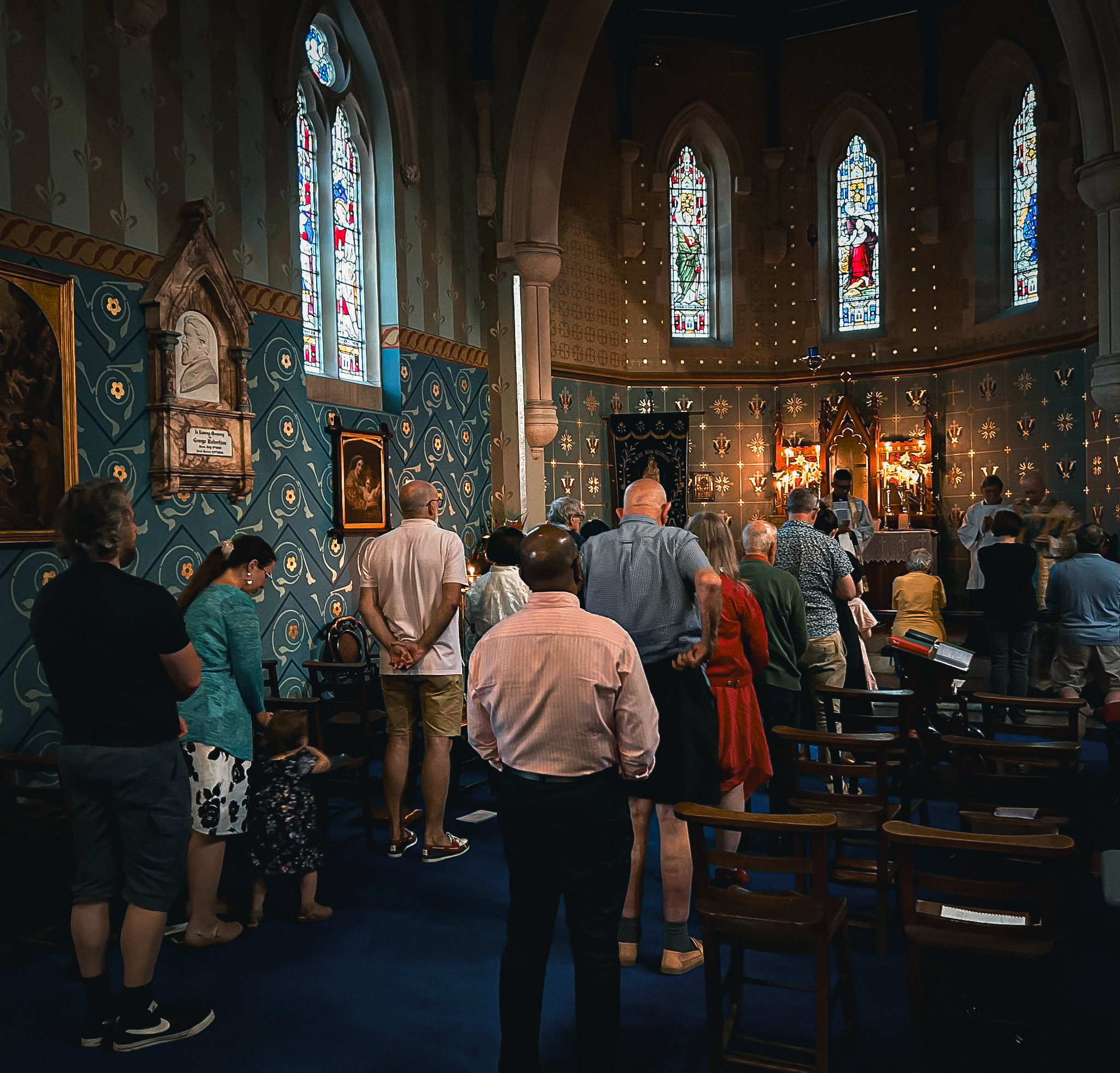
Chapel of Our Lady

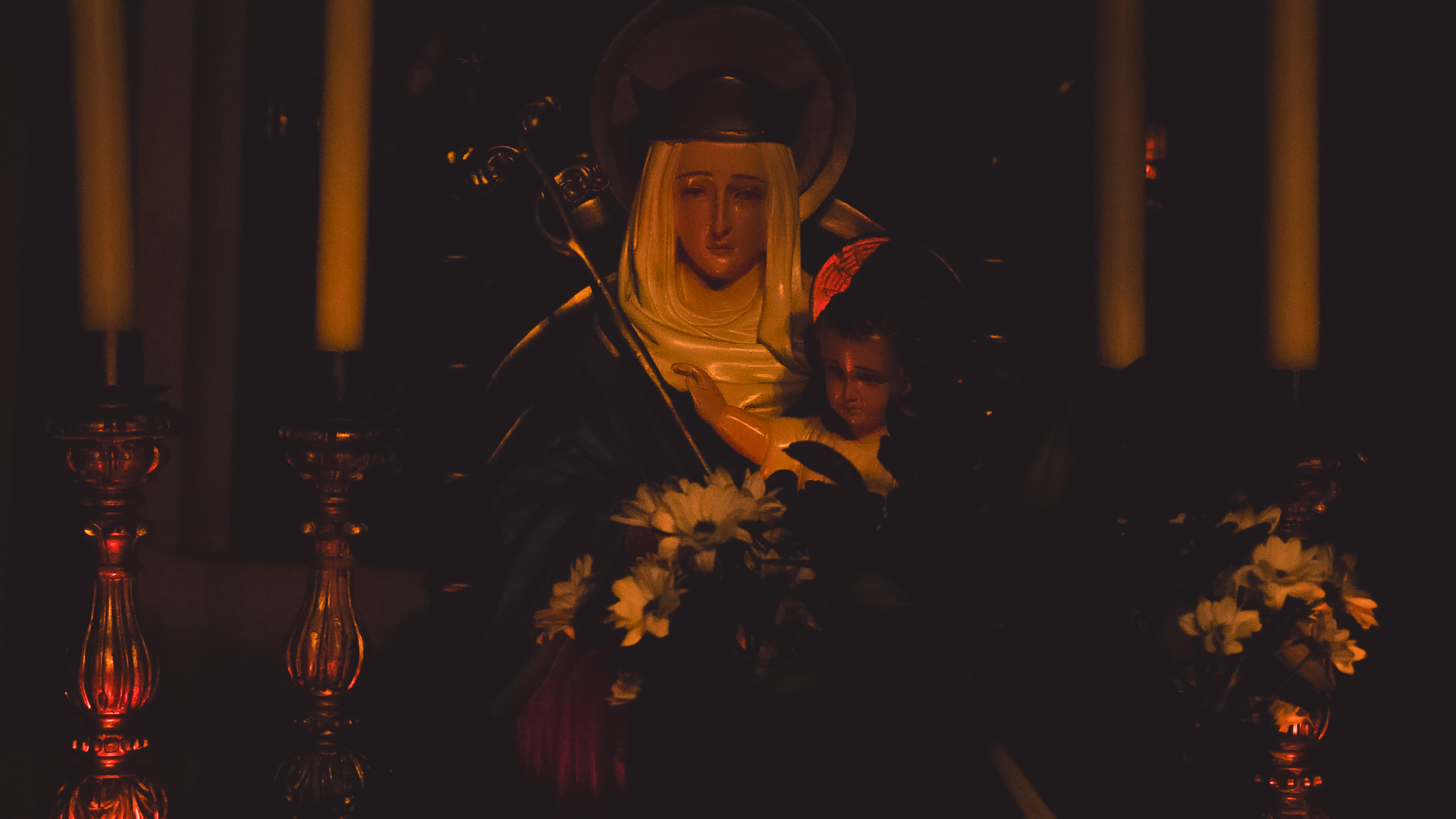
Our Lady of Walsingham shrine

== Liturgical traditions ==
All Saints celebrates Anglo-Catholic style devotional and liturgical practices based on the English Missal, with ample use of incense and the wearing of complete sets of vestments for clergy and servers. Traditional English from the Book of Common Prayer is used throughout the liturgy, with traditional hymns and plainsong chants accompanying the liturgy.

The church supports a rich musical life, with John O'Donnell as music director, maintaining a traditional parish choir of men and boys, along with a girls' choir called the St Hildegard Singers (after Hildegard of Bingen). In addition, there is also a choir of men and women called the All Saints' Singers who mainly sing at the monthly Evensong service and special occasions.

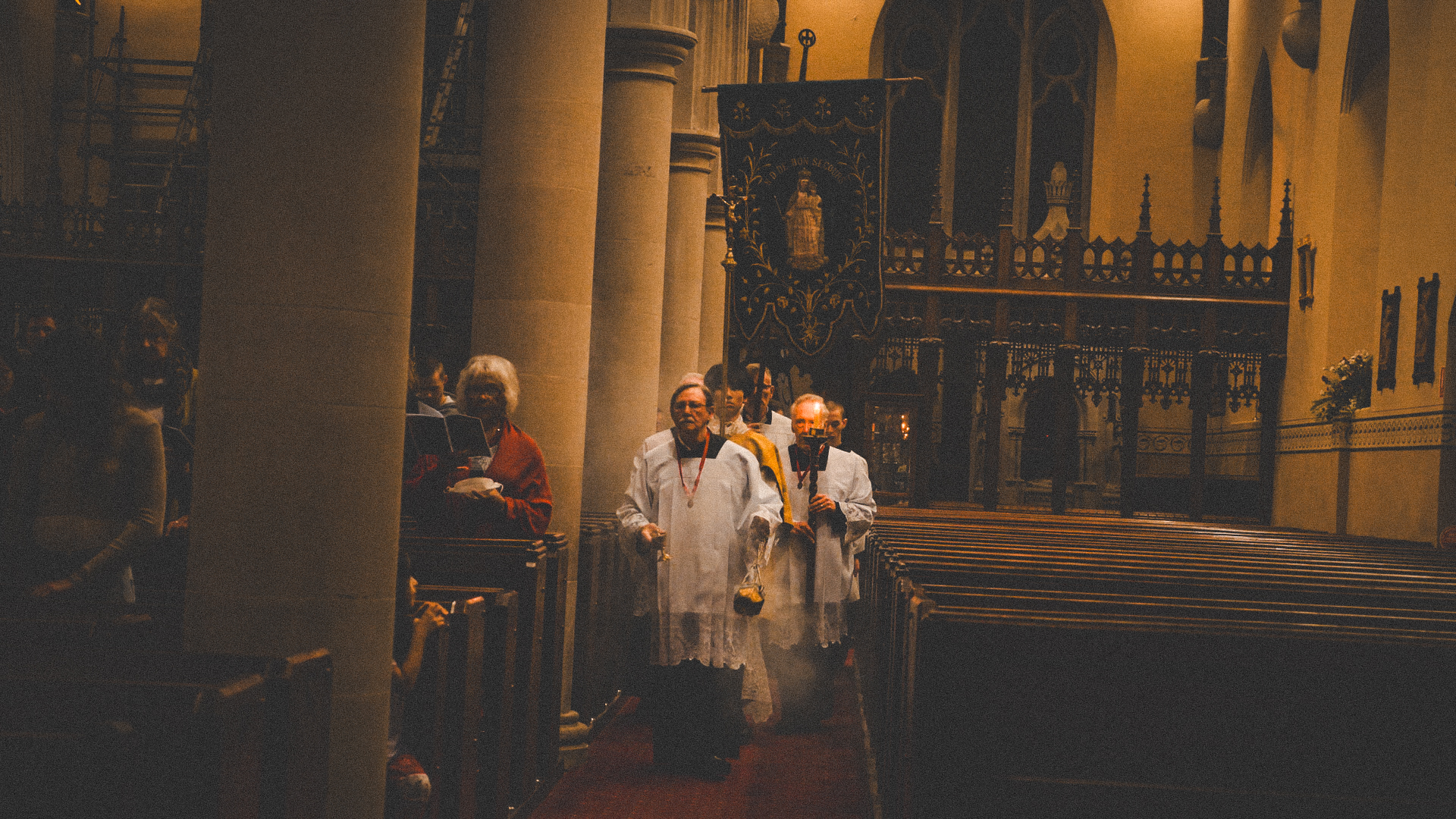
Procession at Christmas Midnight Mass

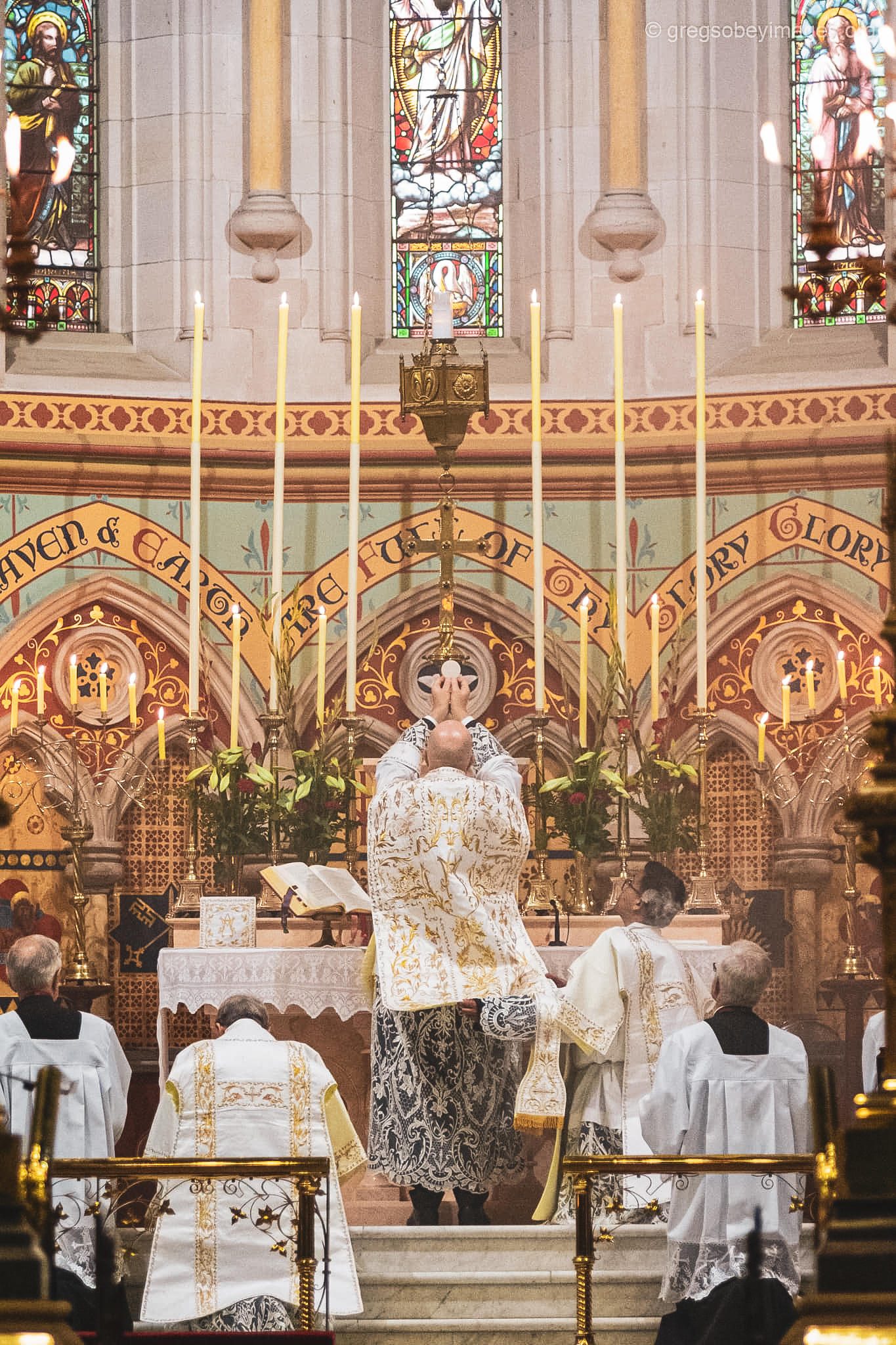
Consecration of the host

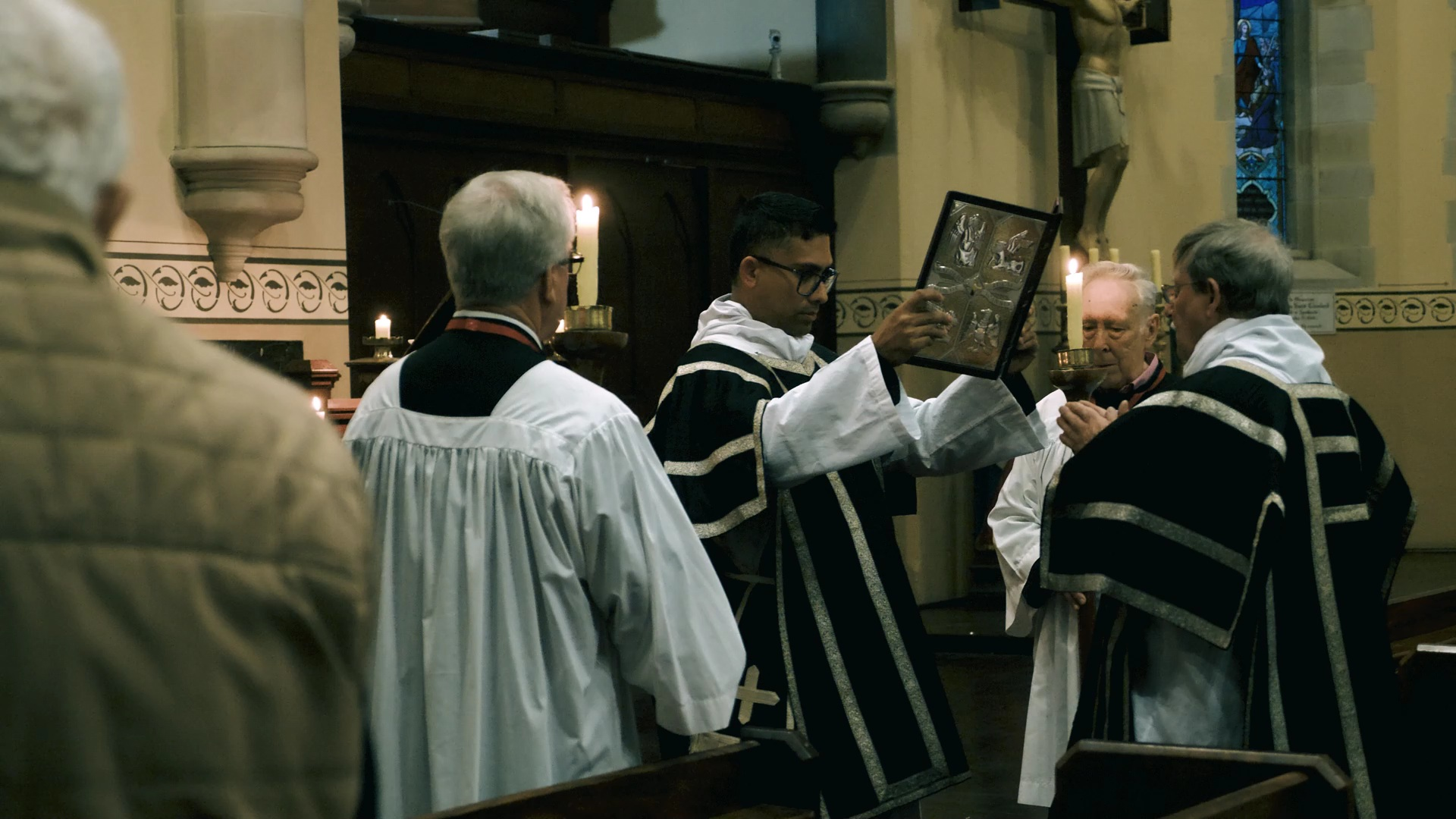
Gospel reading

== Parish priests ==
All Saints has had a succession of parish priests, with the current 16th vicar being Fr René Knaap. The church continues to uphold traditional Anglican doctrine, ministry and worship.

Adjacent to the church is the vicarage, built in 1860, where the parish priests live, showcasing polychrome brickwork.

== Gregory Hall ==
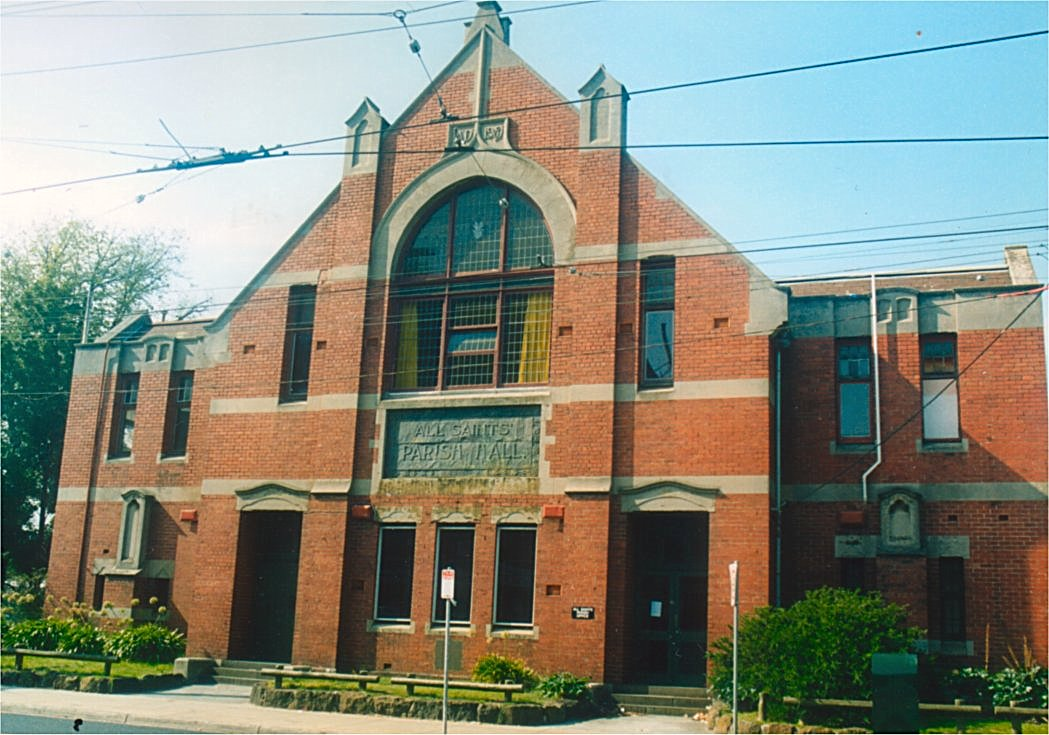
Gregory Hall

Built in 1910–11, Gregory Hall is an integral part of the church's complex, representing abstracted Gothicism with its beaten copper panel. It was named in honour of the church's first vicar and founder, Fr Gregory. Presently, it has been leased and transformed into a gym.

Founded in 1871 and being operated in Gregory Hall, All Saints' Grammar School was one of the earliest church-associated schools. The school saw periods of success and decline, eventually closing in 1937.
