= Albert Edwin Lynch =

Albert Edwin Lynch (10 December 1900 – 23 August 1976) was a musician and Catholic priest born in Collie, Western Australia.
