= List of VFL debuts in 1897 =

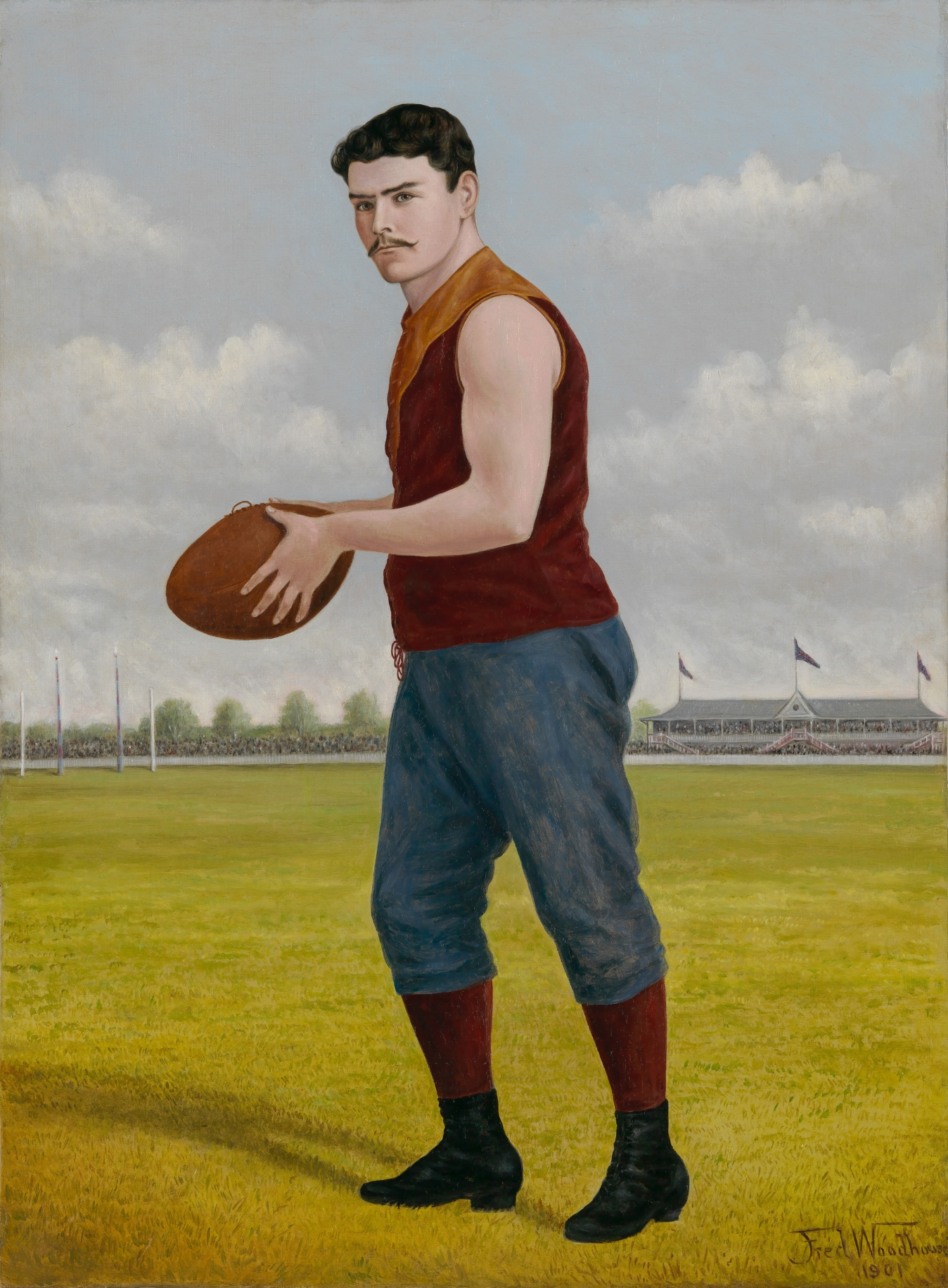
Fitzroy's Geoff Moriarty made his debut in the 1897 VFL season

The inaugural Victorian Football League (VFL) season in 1897 saw 284 players make their senior debut for the eight clubs that comprised the VFL. Many of these players previously played for their clubs in the Victorian Football Association (VFA) prior to the establishment of the VFL.

== Summary ==
Summary of debuts in 1897
Club	VFL debuts
Carlton	39
Collingwood	31
Essendon	36
Fitzroy	37
Geelong	34
Melbourne	38
St Kilda	41
South Melbourne	28
Total	284

== Debuts ==
Name	Club	Age at debut	Round debuted	Games	Goals	Notes
Ernie Walton	Carlton	22 years, 31 days	1	120	8	
Bobby Walsh	Carlton	19 years, 338 days	1	78	21	
Bill Casey	Carlton	24 years, 141 days	5	61	2	
Wally O'Cock	Carlton	21 years, 325 days	1	41	25	
Peter Williams	Carlton	30 years, 30 days	2	34	1	
Tom Sweetman	Carlton	24 years, 123 days	1	30	3	
Jack Reekie	Carlton	26 years, 57 days	1	27	0	
Sam Chapman	Carlton	21 years, 19 days	2	25	17	
Henry Dunne	Carlton	25 years, 76 days	1	24	6	
Chic Breese	Carlton	24 years, 10 days	3	24	10	
Jack Roberts	Carlton	30 years, 164 days	1	24	2	
Bill Weir	Carlton	22 years, 258 days	1	16	1	
Jimmy Aitken	Carlton	24 years, 358 days	1	15	3	
Brook Hannah	Carlton	22 years, 222 days	1	14	0	
Oscar Manchester	Carlton	19 years, 69 days	7	14	3	
Bob Armstrong	Carlton	24 years, 287 days	1	12	0	
Bob Cameron	Carlton	20 years, 5 days	2	11	1	
Jim Lyons	Carlton	21 years, 54 days	4	11	0	
Harry Morgan	Carlton	26 years, 101 days	4	11	0	
Bill Woodhouse	Carlton	23 years, 236 days	1	10	1	
Henry Crane	Carlton	27 years, 266 days	5	8	0	
Arthur Cummins	Carlton	20 years, 262 days	1	7	1	
Jim Caffery	Carlton	25 years, 17 days	3	7	4	
Henry McPetrie	Carlton	20 years, 55 days	1	5	2	
Joe Paton	Carlton	18 years, 245 days	1	5	0	
Bill Patterson	Carlton	23 years, 286 days	8	5	0	
Tom Blake	Carlton	24 years, 297 days	1	4	0	
Jack Frost	Carlton	26 years, 172 days	6	4	0	
Otto Buck	Carlton	20 years, 174 days	1	3	0	
Sam Reid	Carlton	25 years, 23 days	10	3	0	
Ted Heffernan	Carlton	27 years, 357 days	1	2	0	
Harry Howard	Carlton	23 years, 256 days	2	2	0	
Jim Goonan	Carlton	24 years, 5 days	3	2	0	Father of Jimmy Goonan.
Bill Ahern	Carlton	32 years, 67 days	1	1	0	
George Johnston	Carlton	20 years, 85 days	1	1	0	
Harry Gyles	Carlton	16 years, 321 days	2	1	0	
Alby Paterson	Carlton	22 years, 72 days	2	1	0	
Herbie Lowenthal	Carlton	20 years, 339 days	11	1	0	
Billy Arnott	Carlton	24 years, 122 days	14	1	0	
Charlie Pannam	Collingwood	22 years, 218 days	1	179	111	Brother of Albert Pannam, father of Alby and Charlie Pannam, and grandfather of Lou and Ron Richards.
Jack Monohan	Collingwood	23 years, 260 days	1	171	7	Father of Jack Monohan Jr.
Dick Condon	Collingwood	21 years, 50 days	1	149	101	
Lardie Tulloch	Collingwood	26 years, 23 days	1	129	67	
Bill Proudfoot	Collingwood	28 years, 331 days	1	108	0	
Frank Hailwood	Collingwood	24 years, 35 days	1	104	37	
Archie Smith	Collingwood	25 years, 81 days	1	89	119	
Fred Leach	Collingwood	19 years, 108 days	7	84	8	Brother of Arthur and Ted Leach.
Charlie Dow	Collingwood	23 years, 116 days	1	72	1	
Bill O'Brien	Collingwood	20 years, 46 days	1	67	0	
Charlie Sime	Collingwood	25 years, 278 days	1	64	4	
George Williams	Collingwood	26 years, 8 days	1	55	8	
Jim Gregory	Collingwood	21 years, 84 days	1	42	17	
Harry Dowdall	Collingwood	24 years, 313 days	1	38	21	Brother of Jim Dowdall.
Wal Gillard	Collingwood	22 years, 302 days	1	37	20	
Alby Tame	Collingwood	19 years, 303 days	2	29	2	
Arthur Gibbs	Collingwood	24 years, 131 days	2	22	0	
Herman Hellwig	Collingwood	22 years, 17 days	11	21	3	
George Calleson	Collingwood	22 years, 257 days	1	17	5	
Bill Stranger	Collingwood	25 years, 312 days	SF	17	2	
Billy Strickland	Collingwood	32 years, 264 days	1	16	1	
Fred Kay	Collingwood	18 years, 242 days	4	11	6	
Denis Lanigan	Collingwood	23 years, 32 days	6	11	3	
Rhoda McDonald	Collingwood	19 years, 9 days	1	9	2	
Tom Paterson	Collingwood	22 years, 194 days	1	9	0	
Tom Lee	Collingwood	22 years, 218 days	11	8	2	
Jim Dowdall	Collingwood	29 years, 287 days	3	6	1	Brother of Harry Dowdall.
Danny Flaherty	Collingwood	30 years, 187 days	7	4	0	
Dick Poole	Collingwood	24 years, 283 days	1	1	0	
Dick Hall	Collingwood	24 years, 357 days	4	1	0	
Herb Johnson	Collingwood	17 years, 278 days	14	1	0	
Jim Anderson	Essendon	27 years, 172 days	1	136	13	
Son Barry	Essendon	20 years, 61 days	1	134	21	
Hugh Gavin	Essendon	18 years, 202 days	2	112	21	
George Hastings	Essendon	20 years, 115 days	1	109	25	
Ted Kinnear	Essendon	22 years, 193 days	1	108	31	
George Martin	Essendon	22 years, 102 days	1	104	34	
Maurie Collins	Essendon	20 years, 291 days	1	98	7	
Tod Collins	Essendon	21 years, 98 days	1	91	23	
Harry Wright	Essendon	27 years, 25 days	1	86	6	
Pat O'Loughlin	Essendon	23 years, 191 days	1	74	18	
George Stuckey	Essendon	25 years, 306 days	1	71	4	Brother of Harry Stuckey. Played first class cricket for Victoria and won the 1897 Stawell Gift.
Arthur Cleghorn	Essendon	23 years, 158 days	1	61	53	
Joe Groves	Essendon	22 years, 355 days	1	57	0	
Charlie Forbes	Essendon	32 years, 0 days	1	52	13	
Gus Officer	Essendon	21 years, 235 days	2	48	12	
Charlie Moore	Essendon	21 years, 282 days	9	30	34	
George Vautin	Essendon	28 years, 22 days	2	26	1	Played first-class cricket for Tasmania and Victoria.
Norm Waugh	Essendon	22 years, 363 days	1	23	30	
George Cochrane	Essendon	19 years, 337 days	SF	22	4	
Ned Officer	Essendon	28 years, 40 days	1	18	0	
Gus Kearney	Essendon	26 years, 188 days	4	18	8	
Edgar Croft	Essendon	25 years, 8 days	2	15	12	
Colin Campbell	Essendon	25 years, 8 days	SF	12	4	Played first-class cricket for Tasmania.
Archie Sykes	Essendon	30 years, 242 days	03	11	1	
Jim Darcy	Essendon	22 years, 99 days	1	9	1	
Harold Brown	Essendon	18 years, 247 days	3	8	1	
Jim Park	Essendon	22 years, 93 days	8	6	0	
Bert Salkeld	Essendon	20 years, 349 days	1	5	3	
Fred Ball	Essendon	28 years, 265 days	3	5	1	
Alby Stamp	Essendon	17 years, 210 days	12	5	2	
Arthur Leach	Essendon	21 years, 123 days	9	4	2	Brother of Fred and Ted Leach.
Jimmy Thurgood	Essendon	20 years, 342 days	4	3	2	
Dave Ferguson	Essendon	22 years, 160 days	SF	2	0	
Johnny Graham	Essendon	22 years, 3 days	1	1	2	
Bob McCormick	Essendon	18 years, 26 days	1	1	0	
Jim White	Essendon	19 years, 129 days	5	1	1	
Ern Jenkins	Fitzroy	17 years, 216 days	1	182	16	
Bill McSpeerin	Fitzroy	22 years, 225 days	1	126	93	
Geoff Moriarty	Fitzroy	25 years, 192 days	1	106	0	Father of Jack Moriarty.
Chris Kiernan	Fitzroy	19 years, 46 days	1	102	110	
Bert Sharpe	Fitzroy	19 years, 44 days	6	99	59	
Alec Sloan	Fitzroy	26 years, 154 days	2	66	0	
Mick Grace	Fitzroy	22 years, 288 days	1	65	55	Brother of Jim Grace.
Pat Hickey	Fitzroy	25 years, 247 days	1	61	3	
Kelly Robinson	Fitzroy	23 years, 259 days	14	57	1	
Pat Descrimes	Fitzroy	19 years, 128 days	1	55	18	
Jim Grace	Fitzroy	28 years, 229 days	1	47	33	Brother of Mick Grace.
John Dalton	Fitzroy	21 years, 23 days	1	44	0	Brother of Bill Dalton.
Paddy Noonan	Fitzroy	21 years, 260 days	3	36	7	
Jerry Nolan	Fitzroy	27 years, 169 days	1	34	1	
Hugh McEwen	Fitzroy	20 years, 106 days	11	32	0	
Dick McCabe	Fitzroy	19 years, 327 days	1	24	14	
Stan Reid	Fitzroy	24 years, 321 days	4	24	0	
Bill Cleary	Fitzroy	29 years, 105 days	5	21	6	
Arch Muirhead	Fitzroy	20 years, 287 days	1	16	3	
Dan Moriarty	Fitzroy	21 years, 263 days	1	12	2	
Roger Lamley	Fitzroy	27 years, 60 days	1	10	6	
Sam McMichael	Fitzroy	27 years, 294 days	1	10	0	Also played first-class cricket for Victoria.
Tom Banks	Fitzroy	29 years, 325 days	1	8	1	Brother of Albert Banks.
Ivan Astruc	Fitzroy	21 years, 10 days	1	6	1	
Percy Kimberley	Fitzroy	19 years, 120 days	1	5	0	
Ted Staniland	Fitzroy	22 years, 190 days	1	5	3	
Joe Kerrigan	Fitzroy	33 years, 118 days	8	5	1	
Charlie Cameron	Fitzroy	23 years, 101 days	9	5	1	
Mick Peppard	Fitzroy	20 years, 66 days	9	5	0	
Alex Davidson	Fitzroy	20 years, 332 days	10	4	0	
Herb Nolan	Fitzroy	21 years, 245 days	12	4	0	
Tim Curran	Fitzroy	22 years, 92 days	2	3	0	
Bert Rapiport	Fitzroy	31 years, 227 days	2	3	1	
Jim Whelan	Fitzroy	25 years, 135 days	1	2	0	
Fred Nomens	Fitzroy	27 years, 223 days	2	2	1	
Henry Yager	Fitzroy	22 years, 217 days	9	1	0	
Harry James	Fitzroy	20 years, 43 days	13	1	0	
Teddy Rankin	Geelong	25 years, 58 days	1	180	35	Brother of Tom Rankin. Father of Cliff, Bert and Doug Rankin. Great-grandfather of Georgie Rankin.
Henry Young	Geelong	24 years, 6 days	3	167	76	
Peter Burns	Geelong	31 years, 123 days	1	89	7	Brother of Allen Burns.
Teddy Holligan	Geelong	19 years, 043 days	1	84	29	
Jim McShane	Geelong	26 years, 69 days	1	82	53	Brother of Henry and Joe McShane.
Joe McShane	Geelong	28 years, 160 days	1	75	30	Brother of Henry and Jim McShane
Firth McCallum	Geelong	24 years, 132 days	1	74	25	
Charlie Coles	Geelong	17 years, 305 days	1	72	81	
Jim Flynn	Geelong	26 years, 062 days	3	72	22	
Arthur Pincott	Geelong	20 years, 108 days	6	72	0	
Archie Thompson	Geelong	21 years, 276 days	1	61	14	
Jimmy Palmer	Geelong	19 years, 189 days	8	53	8	
Jack Conway	Geelong	30 years, 43 days	1	51	0	
Jack Parkin	Geelong	19 years, 333 days	1	50	11	
Eddy James	Geelong	23 years, 83 days	1	46	85	
Henry McShane	Geelong	23 years, 48 days	1	31	1	Brother of Jim and Joe McShane.
Sam Brockwell	Geelong	26 years, 107 days	3	29	0	
Fred White	Geelong	20 years, 44 days	6	28	28	
Jack Quinn	Geelong	22 years, 222 days	1	21	16	
Ted Greeves	Geelong	18 years, 255 days	SF	20	2	
Bert Barling	Geelong	19 years, 132 days	5	17	4	
Paddy Leahy	Geelong	22 years, 357 days	1	17	0	
Billy Pincott	Geelong	21 years, 288 days	1	17	0	
Tom Maguire	Geelong	23 years, 135 days	1	13	0	
Alf Pontin	Geelong	27 years, 228 days	1	13	1	
Cecil Sandford	Geelong	22 years, 324 days	7	7	1	
Mac Armstrong	Geelong	27 years, 275 days	6	4	0	
Stan Enfield	Geelong	23 years, 257 days	2	3	3	
Bill McKay	Geelong	17 years, 302 days	1	2	0	
Bob Paterson	Geelong	21 years, 210 days	1	2	0	
Ned Moran	Geelong	20 years, 244 days	13	2	0	
John Lucas	Geelong	27 years, 315 days	1	1	0	
Tom Mullen	Geelong	28 years, 134 days	1	1	0	
Jack Sharkey	Geelong	23 years, 117 days	2	1	0	
George Moodie	Melbourne	24 years, 198 days	1	134	29	
Jack Leith	Melbourne	24 years, 269 days	1	133	162	
Charlie Young	Melbourne	19 years, 152 days	1	129	46	
Austin Lewis	Melbourne	26 years, 347 days	1	87	9	
Fred McGinis	Melbourne	22 years, 178 days	1	84	36	
Stewart Geddes	Melbourne	18 years, 133 days	11	91	10	
Maurie Herring	Melbourne	17 years, 236 days	2	68	3	
Dick Wardill	Melbourne	24 years, 349 days	6	60	37	
Eddie Sholl	Melbourne	25 years, 100 days	12	50	2	
Alf Wood	Melbourne	22 years, 82 days	1	46	4	
Henry Mitchell	Melbourne	22 years, 167 days	1	36	1	
George Moysey	Melbourne	22 years, 359 days	1	35	25	Played first-class cricket for Western Australia.
Ned Sutton	Melbourne	29 years, 45 days	1	32	0	
Dave Strahan	Melbourne	22 years, 206 days	2	29	0	
Wally Steele	Melbourne	18 years, 242 days	1	26	12	
Norm McLeod	Melbourne	18 years, 25 days	1	18	1	
Edwin Jenkyn	Melbourne	20 years, 294 days	1	17	2	
Fred Sheahan	Melbourne	26 years, 245 days	1	16	0	Brother of Gerald Sheahan.
Bill McCulloch	Melbourne	24 years, 182 days	1	13	8	
Bert Robinson	Melbourne	18 years, 325 days	1	13	2	
Bert Watson	Melbourne	18 years, 197 days	1	11	0	
Alf Healing	Melbourne	28 years, 286 days	5	10	0	
George Johnstone	Melbourne	27 years, 185 days	1	8	0	
Lew Massey	Melbourne	27 years, 185 days	4	8	1	
John Timothee	Melbourne	27 years, 114 days	4	8	1	
Jack Graham	Melbourne	19 years, 95 days	5	8	2	
Herbert Fry	Melbourne	26 years, 192 days	1	6	1	Played first-class cricket for Victoria.
Jimmy Russell	Melbourne	17 years, 329 days	12	5	4	
Charlie Goding	Melbourne	20 years, 278 days	1	4	1	
Fred Blackham	Melbourne	24 years, 32 days	1	2	0	Brother of Jack Blackham.
Harry Hughes	Melbourne	21 years, 96 days	SF	2	0	
Jim McCoy	Melbourne	21 years, 266 days	3	1	0	
Arthur Kirk	Melbourne	19 years, 144 days	4	1	0	
Tom Crawford	Melbourne	17 years, 297 days	8	1	0	
Jack Godby	Melbourne	17 years, 168 days	8	1	0	
Alex Murdoch	Melbourne	22 years, 1 days	8	1	0	
Walter Lyon	Melbourne	17 years, 289 days	11	1	0	
Gerald Sheahan	Melbourne	24 years, 243 days	SF	1	0	Brother of Fred Sheahan.
Joe Hogan	St Kilda	21 years, 178 days	3	91	11	
Tom McNamara	St Kilda	22 years, 339 days	1	83	1	
Bill Matthews	St Kilda	20 years, 335 days	1	80	7	
Ted Hall	St Kilda	21 years, 89 days	1	73	10	
Mick Blake	St Kilda	22 years, 244 days	2	30	5	Brother of George and Tom Blake.
Fred Whitelaw	St Kilda	19 years, 124 days	4	30	4	
Harry Aylwin	St Kilda	26 years, 143 days	1	29	0	
Billy Shaw	St Kilda	24 years, 186 days	1	29	1	
Syd Phillips	St Kilda	25 years, 274 days	1	25	0	
George Rutherford	St Kilda	21 years, 345 days	10	23	0	
Jerry McGrath	St Kilda	22 years, 150 days	3	21	0	
Reg Stewart	St Kilda	18 years, 246 days	1	15	7	
Billy Beggs	St Kilda	18 years, 268 days	1	13	0	
Danny Dunne	St Kilda	21 years, 24 days	1	13	4	
Ernie Dunne	St Kilda	23 years, 292 days	1	13	4	
Jack Jennings	St Kilda	21 years, 169 days	2	13	1	
Bill Ahern	St Kilda	22 years, 317 days	1	12	6	
Ernest Jones	St Kilda	25 years, 163 days	1	12	1	
George McLeod	St Kilda	17 years, 280 days	4	12	1	
Ernie Stewart	St Kilda	22 years, 184 days	1	11	0	
Algy Hay	St Kilda	22 years, 218 days	1	10	1	
Bill Turner	St Kilda	26 years, 282 days	1	10	1	
Charlie Howell	St Kilda	22 years, 265 days	5	10	0	
Joe O'Grady	St Kilda	24 years, 245 days	1	9	0	
Harry Duigan	St Kilda	21 years, 184 days	8	8	1	
Dan Collins	St Kilda	24 years, 266 days	2	7	0	
George Blake	St Kilda	18 years, 291 days	7	7	0	Represented Australia at the 1906 Intercalated Games and 1908 Summer Olympics as a long distance runner.
Arch Lowe	St Kilda	21 years, 246 days	1	6	1	
Fred Stewart	St Kilda	22 years, 069 days	6	6	0	
George Morrison	St Kilda	24 years, 152 days	9	6	0	
Bill Newton	St Kilda	22 years, 89 days	1	3	0	
Harry Gower	St Kilda	22 years, 135 days	1	2	0	
Charlie Cox	St Kilda	24 years, 135 days	9	2	0	
Gillie Wilson	St Kilda	28 years, 210 days	14	2	1	Played First-class cricket for Victoria, Otago and Wellington.
Alf Bedford	St Kilda	23 years, 49 days	1	1	0	
John Molesworth	St Kilda	19 years, 88 days	2	1	0	
John Grieve	St Kilda	17 years, 277 days	10	1	0	
Mick O'Hagan	St Kilda	19 years, 183 days	12	1	0	
Emery Staines	St Kilda	22 years, 362 days	12	1	0	
Matt Conniff	St Kilda	20 years, 180 days	14	1	0	
Archibald Middleton	St Kilda	25 years, 284 days	14	1	0	
Herb Howson	South Melbourne	24 years, 270 days	1	152	2	Played first-class cricket for Victoria.
Bill Windley	South Melbourne	28 years, 253 days	1	129	36	
Mick Pleass	South Melbourne	22 years, 177 days	1	109	41	
Dave Adamson	South Melbourne	22 years, 328 days	1	90	11	
Bill Fraser	South Melbourne	30 years, 40 days	1	88	18	
Harry Purdy	South Melbourne	21 years, 308 days	1	72	16	Father of Harry Purdy Jnr.
Frank O'Hara	South Melbourne	24 years, 277 days	2	60	1	Brother of Jack and Jim O'Hara.
Tom Gilligan	South Melbourne	22 years, 321 days	1	42	26	
Allen Burns	South Melbourne	26 years, 250 days	1	40	23	Brother of Peter Burns.
Jim O'Hara	South Melbourne	22 years, 231 days	1	37	1	Brother of Jack and Frank O'Hara.
George Davidson	South Melbourne	25 years, 41 days	12	37	0	
Jack Southern	South Melbourne	23 years, 006 days	1	31	3	
Dick Gibson	South Melbourne	30 years, 299 days	1	29	9	
Fred Waugh	South Melbourne	27 years, 154 days	11	22	3	
Dinny McKay	South Melbourne	29 years, 166 days	1	14	14	
Bill Blackwood	South Melbourne	24 years, 84 days	1	13	11	
Charlie McCartney	South Melbourne	23 years, 71 days	1	13	0	
Archie Swannie	South Melbourne	21 years, 337 days	1	13	4	
Michael O'Gorman	South Melbourne	22 years, 181 days	1	12	14	
George Williamson	South Melbourne	31 years, 121 days	2	12	0	
Jack Fleming	South Melbourne	20 years, 318 days	2	12	10	
Dick Doran	South Melbourne	29 years, 89 days	6	9	0	
Eddie Toms	South Melbourne	24 years, 291 days	2	7	0	
Fred Sigmont	South Melbourne	23 years, 359 days	1	6	0	
Horrie Lyons	South Melbourne	21 years, 166 days	6	5	2	
Jack Adamson	South Melbourne	24 years, 122 days	1	3	0	Brother of Dave Adamson.
Jack Deas	South Melbourne	21 years, 184 days	1	2	0	
Alb Thomas	South Melbourne	25 years, 95 days	2	1	0	
