= Caffery =

Caffery is a surname. Notable people with the surname include:

- Chris Caffery (born 1967), heavy metal guitarist, a member of Savatage and the Trans-Siberian Orchestra
- Donelson Caffery (1835–1906), U.S. Senator from Louisiana, soldier in the American Civil War, sugar plantation owner
- Jack Caffery (track and field athlete) (1879–1919), Canadian track and field athlete, competed in the 1908 Summer Olympics
- Jack Caffery (ice hockey) (1934–1992), professional ice hockey player
- Jefferson Caffery (1887–1974), U.S. ambassador to several countries between 1926 and 1955
- Jim Caffery (1872–1918), former Australian rules footballer
- Patrick T. Caffery (1932–2013), attorney and politician from New Iberia, Louisiana, grandson of Donelson Caffery
- Terry Caffery (1949–2022), a retired ice hockey forward with the New England Whalers of the World Hockey Association

== See also ==
- Cafferty
- McCafferty
- McCaffery
