= Arthur Gibbs =

Arthur Gibbs may refer to:

- Arthur Gibbs (cricketer), English cricketer
- Arthur Gibbs (footballer), Australian rules footballer
- A. Hamilton Gibbs (1888–1964), English-American novelist
