= Book of the Dead (anthology) =

1989 horror anthology

- First edition (publ. Mark V. Ziesing)
- Editor: John Skipp and Craig Spector
- Genre: Horror
- Publisher: Mark V. Ziesing

Book of the Dead is an anthology of horror stories first published in 1989, edited by John Skipp and Craig Spector and featuring a foreword written by George A. Romero (erroneously credited as George R. Romero in first print editions of the book). All the stories in the anthology are united by the same premise seen in Romero's apocalyptic films, depicting a worldwide outbreak of zombies and various reactions to it. The first book was followed three years later by a follow-up, Still Dead: Book of the Dead 2, with a new group of writers tackling the same premise, though the second book put the stories in order according to their imagined chronology of the zombie takeover.

The Book of the Dead compilations are regarded as classic anthologies in the horror and splatterpunk genres, featuring a great number of famous names including Stephen King, Joe R. Lansdale, Robert R. McCammon and foreworded by George A. Romero and Tom Savini. They are likely the first anthologies of zombie-themed tales ever printed, and have been cited as perhaps the first true "zombie literature" as such.

According to author Ian McDowell, a third anthology was planned back in 1991. However, bad luck led to it going "through many permutations and publishers over the years. I've been paid for my story by two different publishers and I've proofed two different sets of galleys." Cemetery Dance finally released it under the title Mondo Zombie in 2006.

== Anthology contents ==
=== Book of the Dead ===
1. Foreword by George A. Romero (credited as George R. Romero in first print editions)
2. "Introduction: On Going Too Far, or Flesh Eating Zombies: New Hope for the Future" by Skipp and Spector
3. "Blossom" by Chan McConnell (pseudonym for David J. Schow)
4. "Mess Hall" by Richard Laymon
5. "It Helps If You Sing" by Ramsey Campbell
6. "Home Delivery" by Stephen King
7. "Wet Work" by Phillip Nutman
8. "A Sad Last Love at the Diner of the Damned" by Edward Bryant
9. "Bodies and Heads" by Steve Rasnic Tem
10. "Choices" by Glen Vasey
11. "The Good Parts" by Les Daniels
12. "Less than Zombie" by Douglas E. Winter
13. "Like Pavlov's Dogs" by Steven R. Boyett
14. "Saxophone" by Nicholas Royle
15. "On the Far Side of the Cadillac Desert With Dead Folks" by Joe R. Lansdale
16. "Dead Giveaway" by Brian Hodge
17. "Jerry's Kids Meet Wormboy" by David J. Schow
18. "Eat Me" by Robert R. McCammon

=== Still Dead: Book of the Dead 2 ===
1. Foreword by Tom Savini
2. "Introduction: Nineteen New Ways to Kick Ass" by Skipp and Spector
3. "The Old Man and the Dead" by Mort Castle
4. "DONt/Walk" by Chan McConnell
5. "Necrophile" by Nancy A. Collins
6. "Rise Up and Walk" by K. W. Jeter
7. "One Step at a Time" by Glen Vasey
8. "The Ones You Love" by Skipp and Spector
9. "This Year's Class Picture" by Dan Simmons
10. "Night of the Living Dead Bingo Women" by Simon McCaffery
11. "Abed" by Elizabeth Massie
12. "Come One, Come All" by Gahan Wilson
13. "The Prince of Nox" by Kathe Koja
14. "Beer Run" by Gregory Nicoll
15. "Prayer" by Douglas Morningstar and Maxwell Hart
16. "Calcutta, Lord of Nerves" by Poppy Z. Brite
17. "I Walk Alone" by Roberta Lannes
18. "Undiscovered Countries" by J. S. Russell
19. "Moon Towers" by Brooks Caruthers
20. "Passion Play" by Nancy Holder
21. "Bright Lights, Big Zombie" by Douglas E. Winter

=== Mondo Zombie ===
1. Anne Abrams - "Next to Godliness"
2. Jay Alamares - "Rise"
3. Richard Laymon - "The Living Dead"
4. Caitlin R. Kiernan - "Two Worlds. And In Between"
5. Lucy Taylor - "Fuck the Dead"
6. Jack Ketchum - "The Visitor"
7. Marc Levinthal - "Kids"
8. Adam-Troy Castro - "From Hell It Came"
9. Yvonne Navarro - "Feeding the Dead Inside"
10. Robert Bloch - "Maternal Instinct"
11. Dana Fredsti - "You'll Never Be Lunch in this Town Again"
12. Ian McDowell - "Dead Loves"
13. John Skipp and Marc Levinthal - "God Save the Queen"
14. Simon McCaffery - "Connections"
15. Steve Rasnic Tem and Melanie Tem - "Pit's Edge"
16. Jack Ketchum - "Twins"
17. Robert Devereaux - "Holy Fast, Holy Feast"
18. Lisa Morton - "Sparks Fly Upward"
19. Del James - "Eye Gouge"
20. Nancy Kilpatrick - "Going Down"
21. Stephen L. Antczak and Gregory Nicoll - "Levanta Muertos"
22. Brian Hodge - "Naked Lunchmeat"
23. Buddy Martinez - "Anonymous"
24. Terry Morgan and Christopher Morgan - "Zaambi"
25. M. Christian - "The Buried and the Dead"
26. Douglas E. Winter - "The Zombies of Madison County"
27. Adam-Troy Castro - "Dead Like Me"

== Bibliography ==
- Book of the Dead, eds. John Skipp and Craig Spector. New York: Bantam, June 1989. Paperback. ISBN 0-553-27998-X
- Still Dead: Book of the Dead 2, eds. John Skipp and Craig Spector. New York: Bantam Falcon, August 1992. Paperback. ISBN 0-553-29839-9

== See also ==
- Zombies in popular culture
