= Harry Purdy =

Harry Purdy may refer to:

- Harry Purdy (footballer, born 1867) (1867–1922), Australian rules footballer for South Melbourne between 1897 and 1901
- Harry Purdy (footballer, born 1898) (1898–1978), Australian rules footballer for South Melbourne in 1917 and 1919
