= Joseph Kerrigan =

Joseph Kerrigan may refer to:

- Joe Kerrigan (born 1954), American relief pitcher and longtime pitching coach in Major League Baseball
- J. M. Kerrigan (1884–1964), Irish-American character actor who has a star on the Hollywood Walk of Fame

== See also ==
- John Thomas Kerrigan (1864–1942), Australian rules footballer, nicknamed "Joe"
