= Ernie Stewart =

Ernie Stewart may refer to:

- Earnie Stewart (born 1969), American soccer player
- Ernie Stewart (Australian footballer) (1874–1946), Australian rules footballer
- Ernie Stewart (umpire) (1909–2001), American baseball umpire
