= The Light at the End =

1986 novel by John Skipp and Craig Spector

- Author: John Skipp, Craig Spector
- Language: English
- Publication date: 1986

The Light at the End is a 1986 vampire novel by John Skipp & Craig Spector which became a New York Times bestseller and is often credited as the book that started the splatterpunk movement.

== Story ==
The book takes place in the 1980s punk subculture of New York City. While riding the subway, a young street punk named Rudy Pasko is attacked and turned by an old vampire. Drunk off his new power, Rudy takes to the nightlife and goes on a murder spree, but his actions lead to the formation of a posse composed of several local messengers, artists, and working class citizens who devise a plan to hunt him through the New York underground.

== Influences ==
According to Joss Whedon, the novel was the inspiration for Spike, the punk vampire on Buffy the Vampire Slayer. Coincidentally, in the Season Five episode, "Fool For Love" there is a scene in which Spike fights a hunter in the subways of New York.

== Re-release ==
For its 25th anniversary, the novel was re-released as an ebook from Crossroad Press on October 31, 2010.
