= James McCoy =

James McCoy may refer to:

- James McCoy (politician) (1821–1895), California politician
- James B. McCoy (1839–1911), Wisconsin politician
- James M. McCoy (1930–2022), sixth Chief Master Sergeant of the Air Force
- James Russell McCoy (1845–1924), Magistrate of the British Overseas Territory of Pitcairn Island

== See also ==
- Jim McCoy (1875–1913), Australian footballer
