= Alex Murdoch (disambiguation) =

Alex Murdoch (1875–1958) was an Australian rules footballer

Alex Murdoch may also refer to:

- Alex Murdoch (singer), a participant in the UK series of The X Factor
- Alex Murdoch (River City), fictional character
- Alex Murdoch, participant in series two of Dirty Dancing: The Time of Your Life
- Alex Murdoch, Chair of Governors of Oxted School
- Alex Murdaugh, subject of a high-profile murder case in South Carolina, see Trial of Alex Murdaugh

== See also ==
- Alexi Murdoch (born 1973), a British folk musician and songwriter
