= Home Delivery (disambiguation) =

Home delivery refers to a form of goods delivery directly to the recipient's home.

Home Delivery may also refer to:

- Home Delivery, a 2005 Indian Hindi comedy film
- "Home Delivery" (short story), a 1989 short story by Stephen King
- Julia Zemiro's Home Delivery, an Australian television interview series
