= Frederick Stewart =

Fred, Freddie or Frederick Stewart may refer to:

== Noblemen, politicians and public servants ==
- Frederick Stewart, 1st Lord Pittenweem (c.1590–1625), Scottish nobleman first bearer of title Lord Pittenweem
- Frederick Stewart, 4th Marquess of Londonderry (1805–1872), Anglo-Irish nobleman and minor politician
- Frederick Stewart (colonial administrator) (1836–1889), Scottish Colonial Secretary in Hong Kong
- Fred E. Stewart (c.1881–1942), American tax administrator in California from 1926 to 1942
- Frederick Stewart (Australian politician) (1884–1961), Australian businessman, politician and government minister
- Sir Frederick Stewart (geologist) (1916–2001), Scottish geologist, academic and government advisor
- Fred Stewart (Alberta politician) (1934–2023), Canadian member of Legislative Assembly of Alberta

== Performers ==
- Frederick Stewart, English baritone on 1917 recording of Elgar's The Fringes of the Fleet#Recordings
- Fred Stewart (actor) (1906–1970), American TV and film actor
- Freddie Stewart (actor) (1921–2000), American film actor and singer
- Freddie Stone Stewart (born 1947), American guitarist and vocalist, co-founder of Sly and the Family Stone

== Writers ==
- Fred W. Stewart (1894–1991), American surgical pathologist and author of medical texts
- Fred Mustard Stewart (1932–2007), American novelist
- Fred Stewart (bridge) (born 1948), American bridge player and author

== Other people ==
- Frederick Charles Stewart (1879–1950), Scottish electrical engineer and industrialist
- Fred Stewart (football manager) (1872–1954), English manager of Stockport County and Cardiff City
- Fred Stewart (Australian footballer) (1875–1941), Australian with St Kilda in VFL

== See also ==
- Frederick Stuart (disambiguation)
