= Kristopher Triana =

American writer of horror, southern gothic, and crime fiction

Kristopher Triana (born 1977) is an American writer of horror, southern gothic, and crime fiction. He is a three-time winner of the Splatterpunk Award for Best Novel, winning for Full Brutal (2019), The Night Stockers (with Ryan Harding, 2022), and The Old Lady (2025).

== Career ==
Triana has published novels, collections, novellas, and short fiction. His work is exclusively horror and is associated with the splatterpunk movement, and is also in the genres of crime, noir, and western. He has also been a columnist for Backwoods Survival Guide magazine.

== Reception ==
A Baltimore Sun review of Gone to See the River Man said, "If you thought obsession was creepy, Triana takes it to a whole other level....What unfolds is a descent into pure depravity, where every page feels like it’s watching you back. By the time you reach the River Man himself, you’ll be hollowed out and you’ll love Triana for it."

A Publishers Weekly review of The Detained called it "Triana's pedestrian horror riff on The Breakfast Club" and that the author "rushes through the emotional meltdowns, recriminations, and drastic measures without allowing enough space for real chills".

== Personal life ==
According to ISFDB, Triana was born in New York in 1977. As of 2024, he lived in Connecticut.

== Selected works ==
The following bibliography is listed by Fantastic Fiction.

=== Series ===
==== Gone to See the River Man ====
- Gone to See the River Man (2021)
- Along the River of Flesh (2023)

=== Novels ===
- The Ruin Season (2016)
- Body Art (2016)
- Shepherd of the Black Sheep (2018)
- Full Brutal (2018)
- Toxic Love (2019)
- The Long Shadows of October (2019)
- Blood Relations (2020)
- They All Died Screaming (2020)
- The Night Stockers (with Ryan Harding) (2021)
- And the Devil Cried (2021)
- A Fine Evening in Hell (2022)
- Ex-Boogeyman (2022)
- The Prettiest Girl in the Grave (2023)
- That Night in the Woods (2023)
- The Old Lady (2024)
- Because You're Mine (2024)
- I Don't Recognize This World Anymore (2025)
- Music to Sacrifice Virgins To (2025)

=== Collections ===
- Growing Dark (2015)

=== Novellas and short stories ===
- The Bone Orchard (2017)
- From the Storms, A Daughter (2017)
- Giving From the Bottom (2017)
- The Detained (2018)
- A Cold Place for Dying (2022)

=== Series contributions ===
- The Thirteenth Koyote (2020) — Splatter Western No. 8
- Ballad of the Werevixens (2022) — Splatter Western No. 14

== Awards and honors ==
=== Speculative fiction ===
Speculative fiction awards
Award	Year	Category	Work	Result	Ref.
Splatterpunk Award	2019	Best Novel	Full Brutal	Won	
Splatterpunk Award	2020	Best Novel	Toxic Love	Nominated	
Splatterpunk Award	2021	Best Novel	Gone to See the River Man	Nominated	
Splatterpunk Award	2021	Best Novel	They All Died Screaming	Nominated	
Splatterpunk Award	2021	Best Collection	Blood Relations	Nominated	
Splatterpunk Award	2022	Best Novel	The Night Stockers (with Ryan Harding)	Won	
Splatterpunk Award	2023	Best Novel	Ex-Boogeyman	Nominated	
Splatterpunk Award	2024	Best Novel	Along the River of Flesh	Nominated	
Splatterpunk Award	2025	Best Novel	The Old Lady	Won	
Splatterpunk Award	2025	Best Short Story	"Baby, I'd Die 4 U"	Nominated	
Splatterpunk Award	2025	Best Anthology	The Obituaries #6: Red Romance (with Aron Beauregard, C. V. Hunt, and Daniel J. Volpe)	Nominated	
Splatterpunk Award	2026	Best Novel	Music to Sacrifice Virgins To	Nominated	
