= Jim Goonan =

Jim Goonan may refer to:

- Alf Goonan (1904–1942), Australian rules footballer for North Melbourne
- Jim H. Goonan (1873–1950), Australian rules footballer for Carlton
- Jimmy Goonan (1897–1988), Australian rules footballer for Preston, Carlton and Brunswick
