= Walter Lyon =

Walter Lyon may refer to:

- Walter Lyon (poet) (1886–1915), war poet
- Walter Lyon (cricketer) (1841–1918), English cricketer
- Walter Lyon (footballer) (1879–1964), Australian footballer
- Walter Lyon (politician) (1853–1933), Lieutenant Governor of Pennsylvania
