= Jim O'Hara (footballer) =

Australian rules footballer

Personal information
- Full name: James Andrew O'Hara
- Born: 19 September 1874; South Melbourne, Victoria
- Died: 14 July 1960 (aged 85); South Melbourne, Victoria
- Position: Centre

Playing career^{1}
Years	Club	Games (Goals)
1897; 1899–1901	South Melbourne	37 (1)
- ^{1} Playing statistics correct to the end of 1901.

James Andrew O'Hara (19 September 1874 – 14 July 1960) was an Australian rules footballer who played for the South Melbourne Football Club in the Victorian Football League (VFL).

He was the younger brother of Jack and Frank, who also played for South Melbourne.
