= Fred Whitelaw =

Fred Whitelaw may refer to:

- Fred Whitelaw (footballer) (1878–1959), Australian rules footballer who played with St Kilda
- Fred Whitelaw (brigadier), Australian brigadier
