= Reg Stewart =

Reg Stewart may refer to:

- Reg Stewart (footballer, born 1925) (1925–2011), English footballer for Sheffield Wednesday and Colchester United
- Reg Stewart (Australian footballer) (1878–?), Australian rules footballer for St Kilda
