= Clifford Monohan =

Australian cricketer

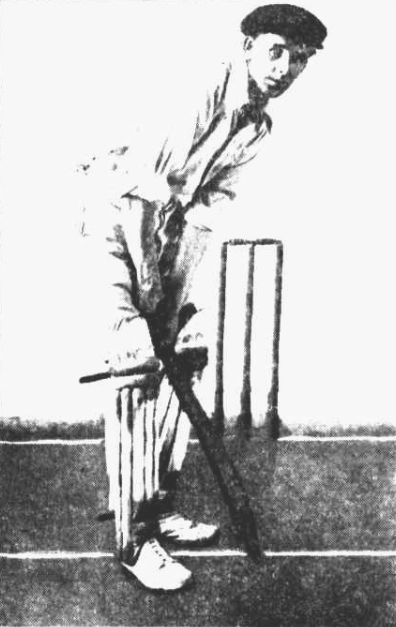

Personal information
- Born: 22 April 1896; Melbourne, Australia
- Died: 9 July 1974 (aged 78); Linden Park, South Australia, Australia

Domestic team information
- Years: Team
- 1922: Victoria
- Source: Cricinfo, 20 November 2015

Clifford Monohan (22 April 1896 – 9 July 1974) was an Australian cricketer. He played one first-class cricket match for Victoria in 1922.

He was born and raised in the suburb of Collingwood in Melbourne and had a brother, Jack, who played for the Collingwood Football Club. He attended Victoria Park State school where he took up Australian rules football and cricket and after graduating he began playing in a Church of England cricket competition for the St. Phillip's Crescent team as an allrounder. Jack Ryder encouraged Monohan to join the Collingwood cricket club ahead of the 1915-16 season and he played two games for the thirds side, five games for the seconds, and made the best eleven by the end of the season as a solid batsman and change bowler.

== See also ==
- List of Victoria first-class cricketers
