= John Skipp =

American horror and fantasy author

- Born: John Mason Skipp; May 20, 1957 (age 69); Milwaukee, Wisconsin, U.S.
- Occupations: Author; screenwriter; editor; songwriter; filmmaker
- Writing career
- Pen name: Gina McQueen, Maxwell Hart
- Period: 1982 – present
- Genres: Horror fiction, fantasy, splatterpunk, bizarro fiction, erotica, porn, satire, social criticism, comedy
- Website: www.johnskipp.com

John Skipp (born May 20, 1957) is a splatterpunk horror and fantasy author and anthology editor, as well as a songwriter, screenwriter, film director, and film producer. He collaborated with Craig Spector on multiple novels, and has also collaborated with Marc Levinthal and Cody Goodfellow. He worked as editor-in-chief of both Fungasm Press and Ravenous Shadows.

Skipp has also been a past contributor to liner notes for cult film distributors Grindhouse Releasing/Box Office Spectaculars on the North American Blu-ray/DVD release of An American Hippie in Israel.

== Biography ==
Skipp's first published short story was in The Twilight Zone Magazine in 1982, called "The Long Ride". He co-authored with Craig Spector his first novel, The Light at the End, which was purchased by Bantam Books in 1984 and published in 1986. It sold over a million copies worldwide. He co-wrote five more original horror novels with Spector over the next six years as well as a novelization of the 1985 cult film Fright Night (based on Tom Holland's script) which managed to be published before their previously sold novel The Light at the End.

Skipp and Spector published their modern post-Romero zombie anthology, Book of the Dead, in 1989 through Bantam. The anthology featured Stephen King (the first printing of his short story "Home Delivery"), Joe R. Lansdale, Ramsey Campbell, Richard Laymon, David J. Schow, Robert R. McCammon, and many other top names in the horror genre.

Skipp and Spector moved to Hollywood where they wrote the screenplay for the 1989 A Nightmare on Elm Street 5: The Dream Child. They separated as writing partners following that, and he stopped publishing for about nine years while working on other pursuits and attending guerilla film school.

As lead singer and songwriter, he performed and recorded with original Megadeth guitar virtuoso Chris Poland in a band called Mumbo's Brain. They recorded an unreleased album called The Book of Mumbo. Tracks from the unreleased album appear on Chris Poland's CD Rare Trax.

Under the pseudonym Maxwell Hart, Skipp wrote the screenplay and songs for Misty Beethoven: the Musical (a musical remake of the adult film The Opening of Misty Beethoven), which won two AVN Awards for "Best Sex Comedy" and "Most Outrageous Sex Scene" (which involved a singing penis).

During this time, he edited what was originally called The Very Last Book of the Dead, which was eventually released as Mondo Zombie in 2006 from Cemetery Dance Publications. He spent four years unsuccessfully attempting to produce his first original feature film, Peekaboo and he wrote the screenplays for the 2011 collection Sick Chick Flicks, including Rose (a film he is currently working on).

He wrote the screenplay for The Long Last Call (that he would eventually novelize in the mid-2000s), and one novel: The Emerald Burrito of Oz (co-written with Marc Levinthal) released by Babbage Press in 2000, later re-released in 2010 by the bizarro fiction company Eraserhead Press.

Under the publishing house Friendly Firewalk Press, Skipp self-published Conscience (a novella) and Stupography (a non-fiction cultural critique). Cemetery Dance Publications released Mondo Zombie in May 2006 and it won the Bram Stoker Award for Best Anthology (tying with Joe R. Lansdale’s Retro-Pulp Tales). He returned to mass market horror with the novel The Long Last Call and teamed up with Cody Goodfellow for a group of novels (Jake's Wake, The Day Before, Spore) as well as many short stories and scripts. In December 2008, Skipp released the ebook and audiobook download, Opposite Sex, under the pen name "Gina McQueen," through publisher Ravenous Romance.

His editing career began with some mammoth anthologies for Black Dog and Leventhal (Zombies: Encounters with the Hungry Dead, Werewolves and Shape Shifters: Encounters with the Beasts Within, and Demons: Encounters with the Devil and His Minions, Fallen Angels, and the Possessed). He edited #4 of The Magazine of Bizarro Fiction which led to him becoming an acquiring editor at Eraserhead Press, and forming his own imprint, Fungasm Press. The first books from Fungasm Press came out October 2011 (Haunt by Laura Lee Bahr and I Am Genghis Cum by Violet LeVoit).

In 2011, e-publisher Literary Partners Group (owners of Ravenous Romance) announced that Skipp would be the editor-in-chief of their new horror/thriller e-publishing imprint named Ravenous Shadows. He is in charge of scheduling four genre titles a month which will begin starting at the end of 2011. The innovation of Ravenous Shadows will be shorter books that can be read in the time it takes to watch a feature film.

Skipp is directing a short film titled Stay at Home Dad (written by Cody Goodfellow) which he is co-directing with Andrew Kasch (Never Sleep Again: The Elm Street Legacy). He is also working on the film version of his script Rose as a 3-D puppet musical.

== Written works ==
=== Novels ===
- Fright Night (1985, Tor Books). (with Craig Spector, based upon the screenplay by Tom Holland)
- The Light at the End (1986, Bantam Books) (with Craig Spector)
- The Cleanup (1987, Bantam Books) (with Craig Spector)
- The Scream (1988, Bantam Books) (with Craig Spector)
- Dead Lines (1989, Bantam Books) (with Craig Spector)
- The Bridge (1991, Bantam Books) (with Craig Spector)
- Animals (1992, Bantam Books) (with Craig Spector)
- The Emerald Burrito of Oz (2000, Babbage Press / re-released 2009, Eraserhead Press) (with Marc Levinthal)
- Conscience, a novella (2004, Friendly Firewalk Press)
- The Long Last Call (2006, Cemetery Dance Publications; Limited edition hardcover / Leisure Books, 2007; paperback)
- Opposite Sex (writing as Gina McQueen) (Ravenous Romance, e-book and audiobook only, 2008) (Ravenous Romance, paperback, 2009)
- Jake's Wake (2008, Dorchester Publishing) (with Cody Goodfellow)
- The Day Before (2009, Bad Moon Books) (with Cody Goodfellow)
- Spore (2010, Dorchester Publishing) (with Cody Goodfellow)
- The Last Goddamn Hollywood Movie (2013, Fungasm Press) (with Cody Goodfellow)
- The Art of Horrible People (2015, Lazy Fascist Press)

=== Short story ===
- with Autumn Christian, "How the Monsters Found God" in Out of the Ruins by Preston Grassmann, ed. (2021) Titan Books, ISBN 978-1-78909-739-9
- with Autumn Christian, "Perfection" in The Unquiet Dreamer by Preston Grassmann, ed. (2019) Titan Books, ISBN 978-1-78636-340-4

=== Anthologies ===
As editor:

- Book of the Dead (with Craig Spector) (1989, Bantam Books)
- Still Dead: Book of the Dead 2 (with Craig Spector) (1992, Bantam Falcon Books)
- Mondo Zombie (2006, Cemetery Dance Publications) – includes John Skipp's short story "God Save The Queen" which was co-written with Marc Levinthal
- Zombies: Encounters with the Hungry Dead (2009, Black Dog and Leventhal Publishers)
- Werewolves and Shape Shifters: Encounters with the Beasts Within (2010, Black Dog and Leventhal Publishers)
- Demons: Encounters with the Devil and His Minions, Fallen Angels, and the Possessed (2011, Black Dog and Leventhal Publishers)
- Psychos: Serial Killers, Depraved Madmen, and the Criminally Insane (2012, Black Dog and Leventhal Publishers)
- The Magazine of Bizarro Fiction #4 – guest editor

=== Non-fiction ===
- Stupography (2004)

=== Published screenplays ===
- Sick Chick Flicks (2012, Cemetery Dance Publications) – contains three scripts: Afterparty, The Legend of Honey Love, and Rose

=== Awards for written works ===
| Work | Year & Award | Category | Result | Ref. |
|---|---|---|---|---|
| The Scream | 1989 Locus Award | Horror Novel | Nominated | |
| Book of the Dead (with Craig Spector) | 1990 Locus Award | Anthology | Nominated | |
| Book of the Dead (with Craig Spector) | 1990 World Fantasy Award | Anthology | Nominated | |
| Mondo Zombie | 2006 Bram Stoker Award | Anthology | Won | |
| Demons: Encounters with the Devil and his Minions, Fallen Angels and the Possessed | 2011 Bram Stoker Award | Anthology | Won | |
| The Long Last Call | 2007 Black Quill Award | Dark Genre Book Trailer | Nominated | |

== Films ==
- Death Collector (1988) – actor, "Splatterpunk #1"
- A Nightmare on Elm Street 5: The Dream Child (1989) – story
- Class of 1999 (1990) – co-writer (uncredited)
- Nightbreed (1990) – actor, "Hotel Room Corpse" (uncredited)
- "Sorry" and "You Lie" – two promo music videos directed by Skipp for the band Mumbo's Brain (he's also the lead singer and songwriter)
- The Storytellers (1999) – wrote and performed the end credits song "Let Them All Know" (performed with a mariachi band)
- Misty Beethoven: the Musical (2004) – wrote screenplay and songs, writing as Maxwell Hart
- "The Disappearing Heart" (2005) – music video for the band ALSO which was conceptualized and directed by John Skipp
- Animals (2008) – based on his 1992 novel
- Stay at Home Dad (2012) – Skipp and Andrew Kasch are co-directing, written by Cody Goodfellow
- Rose (in development)
- Jake's Wake (in development)
- Tales of Halloween (2015) – writer and director (Along with Andrew Kasch) of the short, "This Means War"

== Music ==
- Member of the 70's–80's band Arcade from York, Pennsylvania
- When The Bridge was published in 1991, Skipp and Craig Spector released a soundtrack, with all music written and performed by them and Brian Emrich, to go along with the book called "Music From The Bridge: Soundtrack for the Movie in Your Mind"
- Lead singer and songwriter for the band Mumbo's Brain with guitar virtuoso Chris Poland of Megadeth (some tracks from their unreleased album, The Book of Mumbo, were released on Chris Poland's Rare Trax CD)
- Wrote and performed the song "Let Them All Know" which was featured in the end credits of The Storytellers (a 1999 film starring Brad Dourif and Tippi Hedren)
- Under the pseudonym Maxwell Hart, he wrote the songs for the soundtrack of Misty Beethoven: The Musical (available on CD and MP3)

== Interviews ==
- Author/Filmmaker/Musician John Skipp - A Deep Blue Interview - Cuddly Metaphysics 101 by David Niall Wilson (2006)
- Interview with John Skipp and Cody Goodfellow, Authors of "The Price of a Slice" by John Joseph Adams (2010)
- A Conversation with John Skipp by John Boden (2011)
- An Interview with John Skipp Part I by Lisa Morton (2011)
- Video interviews with Skipp on his first sale, horror, zombies, splatterpunk, bizarro, The Day Before, Werewolves and Shapeshifters, The Long Last Call & Jake's Wake, and film projects (including Rose)
- The Horror Show with Brian Keene - John Skipp and Laura Lee Bahr Ep. 77 (2016)

== See also ==
- List of horror fiction authors
- Bizarro Fiction
- Splatterpunk
