= Full Brutal =

2018 novel

- Author: Kristopher Triana
- Genre: Horror
- Publisher: Grindhouse Press
- Publication date: 12 June 2018
- Media type: Paperback
- Pages: 264
- ISBN: 978-1-96-175800-1

Full Brutal is a 2018 splatterpunk horror novel written by Kristopher Triana and published by Grindhouse Press. The novel received the 2019 Splatterpunk Award for Best Novel.

== Premise ==
Kim White is a sixteen-year-old high school cheerleader who's relatively popular, intelligent, and attractive, and has a wealthy father that enables her to live a privileged life. However, she finds herself growing bored with her life, and her friends persuade her that losing her virginity will be a life-changing experience. Kim decides to seduce and manipulate her sex ed teacher Mr. Blakley into being her first sexual partner, but the experience doesn't satisfy her. She soon finds that she derives extreme pleasure from ruining a person's life, so she embarks on a plan to first destroy Mr. Blakley by exposing his infidelity. Her physical state after seducing him hints that she may be pregnant with Blakley's child, and as her pregnancy becomes more and more obvious, she believes the baby inside her craves violence and human flesh.

Over time, Kim finds herself engaging in even more sadistic pursuits, first manipulating her sometimes-date Derek into sexually assaulting Mr. Blakley's daughter Caitlin, then taking pictures of her afterwards and distributing them. She also kills Mr. Blakley when he tries to physically retaliate against her, leading to a spiral of events ending in Caitlin attempting suicide; Kim intentionally waits to call an ambulance until she's sure Caitlin will die. As the baby grows inside her, Kim engages in more murders--killing Derek after he assaults her, then her friend Dakota--and begins preserving and consuming the bodies.

Kim's best friend Amy eventually finds Mr. Blakley's wallet in Kim's bathroom, leading her to assault and abduct Amy and her boyfriend before killing them both. She finally obtains a gun and goes on a killing spree of her fellow cheerleaders, cornering two in a public restroom before experiencing extreme pain from the baby inside her. The novel ends with police and EMTs surrounding Kim as she mutilates herself while trying to stab her unborn child to death, supposedly succumbing to blood loss and dying.

== Reception ==
Full Brutal's reception as a splatterpunk novel was well received. Many critics praised the novel's abundance of violence and gore. In particular, Kristopher Triana's depiction of a female perspective was praised, with critics claiming that it perfectly conveyed Kim's experience with her sadistic traits, but also with her struggles with womanhood.

Full Brutal was also the winner of the 2019 Splatterpunk Medal for best novel.
