= McCafferty (disambiguation) =

"McCafferty" is an Irish folk song.

McCafferty may also refer to:

- McCafferty (band)
- McCafferty (surname)
- McCafferty Spur, a geographical feature in the Cook Mountains, Antarctica
- Elizabeth McCafferty Three-Decker, house in Worcester, Massachusetts
- McCafferty's, a former interstate bus company that merged with Greyhound Australia in 2004.

== See also ==
- McCaffery
