= Autumn Christian =

American horror and science fiction writer

- Born: Texas
- Occupation: Author
- Writing career
- Genres: Horror; Science Fiction
- Website: www.autumnchristian.net

Autumn Christian is an American horror and science fiction writer known for her book Girl Like a Bomb.

== Biography ==
Christian self-published her debut novel The Crooked God Machine in 2011. She wrote the book between the ages of 19 and 21. Christian also self-published her 2013 novel We Are Wormwood. In 2019, her novel Girl Like a Bomb was published by Clash Books.

Christian has two short story collections, A Gentle Hell (2012, Dark Continents Publishing) and Ecstatic Inferno (2015, Eraserhead Press). Christian has had short stories featured in the anthologies Eternal Frankenstein (2016), You, Human (2016), A Breath from the Sky: Unusual Stories of Possession (2017), and Broad Knowledge: 35 Women Up to No Good (2018).

Christian was a writer on the game State of Decay 2.

Christian is originally from Texas. As of 2026, she lives in Kingfisher, Oklahoma.

- A Gentle Hell (2012) — Short story collection
- We are Wormwood (2013)
- Ecstatic Inferno (2015) — Short story collection
- "Sewn Into Her Fingers" in Eternal Frankenstein (2016)
- "Pink Crane Girls" inYou, Human (2016)
- "Skin Suits" in A Breath from the Sky: Unusual Stories of Possession (2017)
- "Flowers for Dogman" in Broad Knowledge: 35 Women Up To No Good (2018)
- Girl Like a Bomb (2019)
- with John Skipp, "How the Monsters Found God" in Preston Grassmann, ed. (2021). Out of the Ruins, Titan Books, ISBN 978-1-78909-739-9
