= Gerald Sheahan =

Australian rules footballer

Personal information
- Full name: James Gerald Sheahan
- Born: 28 December 1872; Melbourne
- Died: 30 August 1959 (aged 86); Yea, Victoria
- Original team: St Patrick's College

Playing career^{1}
Years	Club	Games (Goals)
1897	Melbourne	1 (0)
- ^{1} Playing statistics correct to the end of 1897.

James Gerald Sheahan (28 December 1872 – 30 August 1959) was an Australian rules footballer who played with Melbourne in the Victorian Football League (VFL).

His brother Fred Sheahan also played for Melbourne.
