= McCaffery =

McCaffery is a surname. Notable people with the surname include:

- Aidan McCaffery (born 1957), English footballer and manager
- Anne McCaffery (1926–2011), American writer, winner of Hugo and Nebula awards
- Christian McCaffrey (born 1996), American football player
- Ed McCaffrey (born 1968), American football player
- Edward McCaffery (born 1958), American legal scholar
- Fran McCaffery (born 1959), American college basketball coach
- Harry McCaffery (1858–1928), American baseball player
- John McCaffery (1913–1983), American television host
- Ken McCaffery (1929–2021), Australian rugby league player
- Larry McCaffery (born 1946), American literary critic and editor
- Margo McCaffery, American nurse
- Seamus McCaffery (born 1950), American judge
- Simon McCaffery (born 1963), American writer
- Steve McCaffery (born 1947), Canadian poet and academic
- Trudy McCaffery (1944–2007), racehorse owner and breeder
- Patrick McCaffery, (1844-1862), executed on 11 January 1862, who is the subject of the traditional song McCafferty
- Cathal McCaffrey (born 2011), singer songwriter, session musician, conductor and businessman.

Fictional Characters

- Meg McCaffery, one of the main characters of The Trials of Apollo series by Rick Riordan. She is a demigod daughter of Demeter and Phillip McCaffery.

== See also ==
- McCafferty (disambiguation)
