= Bob Molesworth =

Australian rules footballer

Personal information
- Full name: Robert Hickman Molesworth
- Born: 24 November 1879; St Kilda, Victoria
- Died: 15 June 1948 (aged 68); Hampton, Victoria
- Original team: Cumloden College

Playing career^{1}
Years	Club	Games (Goals)
1902	St Kilda	2 (0)
- ^{1} Playing statistics correct to the end of 1902.

Robert Hickman Molesworth (24 November 1879 – 15 June 1948) was an Australian rules footballer who played with St Kilda in the Victorian Football League (VFL).

Robert Hickman Molesworth, one of three sons of Flora Macdonald (née Matheson) and Robert Arthur Molesworth, was born on 24 November 1879; his paternal grandfather was judge Robert Molesworth and his brother was John Molesworth, also a footballer.
