= Frederick Stuart =

Frederick Stuart may refer to:

- Frederick Stuart (British politician) (1751–1802), MP for Ayr Burghs and Buteshire
- Frederick Stuart (Australian politician) (1879–1954), Australian member of New South Wales Legislative Assembly
- Freddie Stuart, English actor in the 2002 Spooks episode "Traitor's Gate"

== See also ==
- Frederick Stuart Church (1842–1924), American drawing artist and illustrator
- Frederick Stuart Greene (1870–1939), American Superintendent of New York State Public Works
- Frederick Stewart (disambiguation)
