= Henry Yager (footballer) =

Australian rules footballer

Personal information
- Full name: Henry Adam Peter Yager
- Born: 28 November 1874; Fitzroy North, Victoria
- Died: 15 February 1915 (aged 40); Melbourne, Victoria
- Original team: Fitzroy Juniors

Playing career^{1}
Years	Club	Games (Goals)
1897	Fitzroy	1 (0)
- ^{1} Playing statistics correct to the end of 1897.

Henry Yager (28 November 1874 – 15 February 1915) was an Australian rules footballer who played with Fitzroy in the Victorian Football League.

Born in Fitzroy North to John G. Yager, who would later serve as Mayor of Fitzroy from 1892 to 1893. Yager had a brother, Phillip, and two sisters, Lizzie and Mary.

After playing with the Fitzroy Juniors, Yager was part of Fitzroy's senior squad for the inaugural VFL season in 1897. He made his VFL debut in Round 9 on 3 July 1897 against St Kilda at Brunswick Street Oval. This was to be Yager's only VFL game.

Following the outbreak of war in 1899, Yager enlisted in the 5th Victorian Mounted Rifles (as "Harry Yager"). In recognition of his service, Yager was awarded the Queen's South Africa Medal with three campaign clasps.

Yager was also a member of the Cumberland Cricket Club and worked at the local Hoffman Brickworks, where he was active in the Pottery and Tile Association.

Yager died in Melbourne Hospital on 15 February 1915 following "a long illness from dropsy and heart trouble." The burial service was Church of England.

== Sources ==
- Cullen, B. (2015) Harder than football, Slattery Media Group: Melbourne, ISBN 9780992379148.
- Holmesby, R. & Main, J. (2009) The Encyclopedia of AFL Footballers, 8th ed. Bas Publishing: Melbourne, ISBN 9781920910198.
- Henry Yager at AustralianFootball.com
