= John Molesworth =

Australian rules footballer

Personal information
- Full name: John Matheson Molesworth
- Born: 16 February 1878; St Kilda, Victoria
- Died: 27 August 1942 (aged 64); Morrisons, Victoria
- Original team: Cumloden College

Playing career^{1}
| Years | Club | Games (Goals) |
| 1897 | St Kilda | 1 (0) |
- ^{1} Playing statistics correct to the end of 1897.

John Matheson Molesworth (16 February 1878 – 27 August 1942) was an Australian rules footballer who played with St Kilda in the Victorian Football League (VFL).

John Matheson Molesworth, one of three sons of Flora Macdonald (née Matheson) and Robert Arthur Molesworth, was born on 16 February 1878; his paternal grandfather was judge Robert Molesworth and his brother was Bob Molesworth, also a footballer.
