= Tom Mullen (Australian footballer) =

Australian rules footballer

Personal information
- Full name: Thomas Stephen Mullen
- Born: 25 December 1868; Geelong West, Victoria
- Died: 11 April 1942 (aged 73); Stawell, Victoria

Playing career^{1}
Years	Club	Games (Goals)
1897	Geelong	1 (0)
- ^{1} Playing statistics correct to the end of 1897.

Thomas Stephen Mullen (25 December 1868 – 11 April 1942) was an Australian rules footballer who played with Geelong in the Victorian Football League (VFL).
