= Bill Blackwood (footballer) =

Australian rules footballer

Personal information
- Full name: William Herbert Vernon Blackwood
- Born: 13 February 1873; Daylesford, Victoria
- Died: 31 March 1957 (aged 84); Kew, Victoria

Playing career^{1}
Years	Club	Games (Goals)
1897	South Melbourne	13 (11)
1899	St Kilda	10 (2)
Total		23 (13)
- ^{1} Playing statistics correct to the end of 1899.

William Herbert Vernon Blackwood (13 February 1873 – 31 March 1957) was an Australian rules footballer who played with South Melbourne and St Kilda in the Victorian Football League (VFL).
