= Charlie McCartney =

Australian rules footballer (1873–1949)

Personal information
- Full name: Charles Patrick McCartney
- Born: 17 March 1873; West Melbourne, Victoria
- Died: 26 May 1949 (aged 76); Colac, Victoria
- Original team: West Melbourne

Playing career^{1}
Years	Club	Games (Goals)
1897	South Melbourne	13 (0)
1899	Essendon	4 (0)
Total		17 (0)
- ^{1} Playing statistics correct to the end of 1899.

Charles Patrick McCartney (17 March 1873 — 26 May 1949) was an Australian rules footballer who played with South Melbourne and Essendon in the Victorian Football League (VFL).

== Family ==
The son of Francis McCartney (1840-1895), and Ann McCartney (1840-1898), née Ryan, Charles Patrick McCartney was born on 17 March 1873.

He married Alice Maud Felton (1877-1925) in 1904. He later married Jessie Wilhelmina Rachel Johnson (1866-1946), née Gail, in 1933.

== Football ==
McCartney first played with West Melbourne in the junior competition and joined South Melbourne for the 1896 VFA season. He played for South Melbourne in its first VFL match, against Melbourne, at the Lake Oval, on 8 May 1897.

In 1898 he returned to West Melbourne, the team wearing crepe in the week following his mother's death.

In 1899 McCartney returned to the VFL, this time playing with Essendon.

== Later life ==
McCartney worked for the International Harvester Company for nearly fifty years, retiring in 1940.

== Death ==
Charles Patrick McCartney died at Colac on 26 May 1949.
