= Algy Hay =

Australian rules footballer

Personal information
- Full name: Alexander Gosse Hay
- Born: 2 October 1874; Linden Park, South Australia
- Died: 28 August 1901 (aged 26) on board G.M.S. Weimar near Fremantle
- Original team: Cumloden
- Height: 166 cm (5 ft 5 in)
- Weight: 62 kg (137 lb)

Playing career^{1}
Years	Club	Games (Goals)
1897	St Kilda	10 (1)
- ^{1} Playing statistics correct to the end of 1897.

Alexander Gosse "Algy" Hay (2 October 1874 – 28 August 1901) was an Australian rules footballer. He played 10 games for St Kilda in the inaugural Victorian Football League season in 1897 and kicked one goal. His debut match was the Round 1 clash with Collingwood at Victoria Park and he was said to be the smallest player in the VFL at the time.

Hay died from Bright's disease on board a vessel returning from Europe in August 1901.
