= Jimmy Aitken =

Australian rules footballer

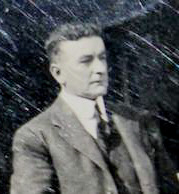
- Aitken in 1920

Personal information
- Full name: James Munroe Aitken
- Born: 15 May 1872; Sebastopol, Victoria
- Died: 27 August 1944 (aged 72); Carlton North, Victoria
- Position: Utility

Playing career^{1}
Years	Club	Games (Goals)
1891–1896	Carlton (VFA)	83 (19)
1897–1898	Carlton (VFL)	15 (3)
1898	Melbourne	4 (0)
- ^{1} Playing statistics correct to the end of 1898.

James Munroe Aitken (15 May 1872 – 27 August 1944) was an Australian rules footballer who played in the Victorian Football Association (VFA) and the Victorian Football League (VFL).

== Early life ==
The third child of the Scottish born John Aitken (1837–1885) and Catherine Kerr (1842–1879), James Munroe Aitken was born at the Ballarat suburb of Sebastopol on 15 May 1872. Both of his parents died from tuberculosis before he turned 13.

== Football career ==
=== Carlton (VFA) ===
Jimmy Aitken made his senior football debut aged 19, late in the 1891 VFA season against Melbourne on 12 September. The Australasian report of the match described him as “a recruit of sterling promise”. He played consistently across the next five seasons, establishing himself as one of Carlton’s leading players.

=== Carlton (VFL) ===
Aitken was Carlton's inaugural VFL captain when the league was formed for the 1897 season, replacing Tom Blake. He had been the club's vice-captain the previous season when they competed in the Victorian Football Association (VFA), and was elected captain before the start of the season, with a twelve to eight majority vote. He played in all 14 of Calton’s games in 1897, scoring three goals in their Round 13 match with St. Kilda.

After showing disappointing form at the start of the 1898 season, just making the side to play against South Melbourne and Melbourne, he was left out of the team and replaced by Ernie Walton for Round 3.

=== Melbourne (VFL) ===
Aitken left the Blues midway through the 1898 season and joined Melbourne. He played four games for Melbourne before leaving the game. He was the first player in the VFL to play senior premiership matches for two clubs in the same season.

== Later life ==
James Aitken married Katie Middlemiss at East Brunswick on 22 May 1901. Their son, Archibald James Aitken, was born at their Brunswick home on 12 June 1904. Archibald later served as Melbourne Football Club’s Chief Medical Officer.

Aitken worked as a bookmaker and caterer after his football career.

James Ernest Munroe Aitken died at his Carlton North home on 27 August 1944.
