= Bill Patterson (footballer, born 1873) =

Australian rules footballer

Personal information
- Full name: William Arthur Patterson
- Born: 13 September 1873; Learmonth, Victoria
- Died: 17 December 1939 (aged 66); Ballarat
- Original team: Rainbow

Playing career^{1}
Years	Club	Games (Goals)
1897–98	Carlton	5 (0)
- ^{1} Playing statistics correct to the end of 1898.

William Arthur Patterson (13 September 1873 – 17 December 1939) was an Australian rules footballer who played for the Carlton Football Club both before and after the formation of the Victorian Football League (VFL).
