= Arthur Kirk =

Australian rules footballer

Personal information
- Full name: Arthur Edward Kirk
- Born: 5 January 1878; Melbourne, Victoria
- Died: 28 February 1958 (aged 80); Murrumbeena, Victoria
- Height: 168 cm (5 ft 6 in)

Playing career^{1}
Years	Club	Games (Goals)
1897	Melbourne	1 (0)
- ^{1} Playing statistics correct to the end of 1897.

Arthur Edward Kirk (5 January 1878 – 28 February 1958) was an Australian rules footballer who played for the Melbourne Football Club in the Victorian Football League (VFL).
