= Tim Curran (Australian rules footballer) =

Australian rules footballer

Personal information
- Full name: Thomas Felix Curran
- Born: 12 February 1875; Collingwood, Victoria
- Died: 14 September 1915 (aged 40); Clifton Hill, Victoria
- Original teams: Fitzroy Jnrs, Primrose

Playing career^{1}
Years	Club	Games (Goals)
1897	Fitzroy	3 (0)
1900	St Kilda	10 (1)
Total		13 (1)
- ^{1} Playing statistics correct to the end of 1900.

Thomas Felix "Tim" Curran (12 February 1875 – 14 September 1915) was an Australian rules footballer who played with Fitzroy and St Kilda.

== Sources ==
- Holmesby, Russell & Main, Jim (2009). The Encyclopedia of AFL Footballers. 8th ed. Melbourne: Bas Publishing.
- Tim Curran's playing statistics from AFL Tables
- Tim Curran at AustralianFootball.com
