= Bill Woodhouse (footballer) =

Australian rules footballer

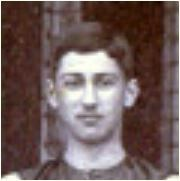
- Woodhouse in 1891

Personal information
- Full name: William Theodore Woodhouse
- Born: 14 September 1873; St Kilda, Victoria
- Died: 24 November 1934 (aged 61); Launceston, Tasmania
- Original team: Broken Hill
- Position: Follower

Playing career^{1}
Years	Club	Games (Goals)
1897	Carlton	10 (1)
1898	St Kilda	7 (2)
Total		17 (3)
- ^{1} Playing statistics correct to the end of 1897.

William Theodore Woodhouse (14 September 1873 – 24 November 1934) was an Australian rules footballer who played with Carlton and St Kilda in the Victorian Football League (VFL).

A tall man, Woodhouse was also a keen athlete who occasionally missed games to compete in cross country races. He started his football career at St. Kilda in 1891. In 1893 he relocated to Broken Hill for a year before returning to Melbourne. He started at Carlton in 1894 and played in its first VFL match in 1897.

He settled in St. Kilda and eventually took over his father pharmacy.

Bill Woodhouse committed suicide by ingesting cyanide while on holiday in Launceston, Tasmania. He usual place of residence was in Park St. St. Kilda, Victoria. His son gave evidence at the Coroners inquest that his father was a chemist.
