= Archie Swannie =

Australian rules footballer

Personal information
- Full name: Archibald Ernest Swannie
- Born: 5 June 1875; Emerald Hill, Victoria
- Died: 29 May 1941 (aged 65); Moreland, Victoria

Playing career^{1}
Years	Club	Games (Goals)
1897	South Melbourne	13 (4)
- ^{1} Playing statistics correct to the end of 1897.

Archibald Ernest Swannie (5 June 1875 – 29 May 1941) was an Australian rules footballer who played for the South Melbourne Football Club in the Victorian Football League (VFL).

== Family ==
The son of David Swannie (1828-1888), and Mary Swannie (1836-1901), née Hassett, Archibald Ernest Swannie was born at Emerald Hill, Victoria on 5 June 1875.

He married Alice Josephine Shea (1877-1920) at Tarrawingee, Victoria in November 1902. They had three children; two sons and a daughter: John (b.1903), Doris (b.1907), and James (b.1908).

== Football ==
Commencing his football career with Hawthorn (not the current AFL club), he played a game for Melbourne in 1895, before spending two years with South Melbourne (1896–1897), including their first year in the VFL.

In 1898 he returned to Hawthorn, before moving to West Melbourne halfway through the season.

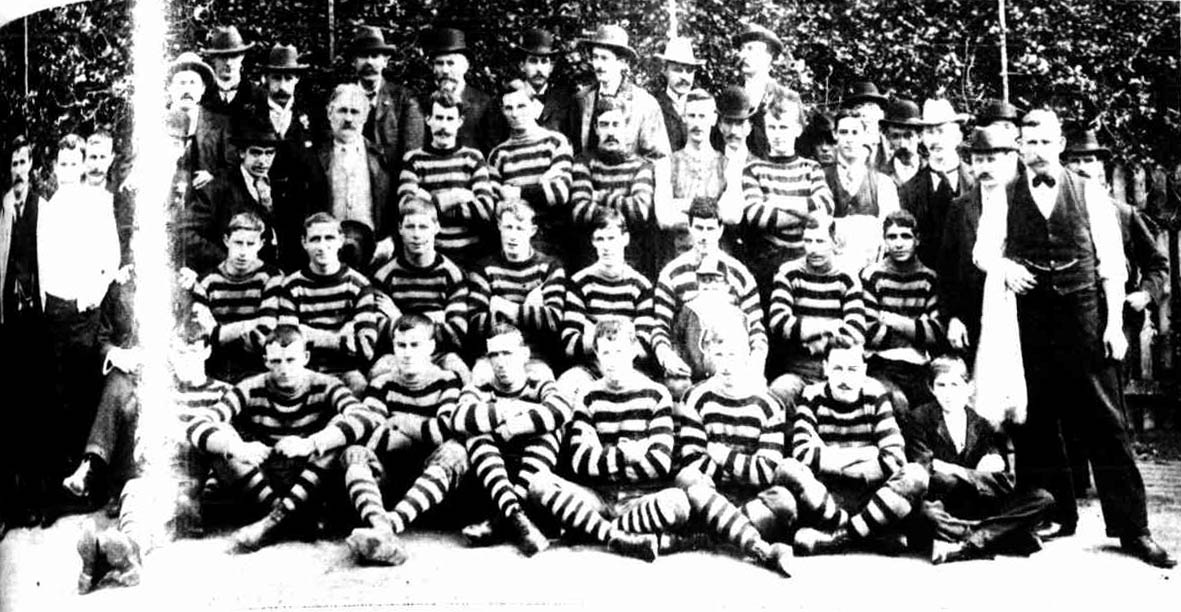
Port Melbourne Premiership Team (1901) Swannie is third player from right, front row.

=== Port Melbourne (VFA) ===
He then moved to Port Melbourne for the 1899 VFA season, and was a member of their 1901 premiership team. His final game for Port Melbourne came at the end of the 1902 season, when it was reported that he was moving to Queensland.

=== Sydney Naval (NSWANFL) ===
He played for Sydney Naval Football Club, in the New South Wales Australian National Football League (NSWANFL) for six seasons (1903-1908) — for three of them, he was also the team's coach (1906-1908), winning the premiership in 1907 — and, also, over those six seasons, he played in six representative matches for New South Wales.

== Rescuer ==
He was awarded the bronze medal of the Royal Humane Society of Australasia on two occasions:

- 1899: For saving the life of Maud Fazackerly (1878-1949), on 13 February 1899, who jumped into the Yarra River near Queen's Bridge in Melbourne.
- 1900: For saving the life of Nicolson Lee, a school teacher, from drowning, at the Port Melbourne Railway Pier, on Christmas Day, 1899.

== Death ==
After a few years living in Queensland and New South Wales, he and his wife returned to Victoria and lived in Essendon. He died on 29 May 1941 at the Sacred Heart Private Hospital, Moreland, Victoria, after a brief illness.
