= Jim McShane =

Australian rules footballer, born 1871

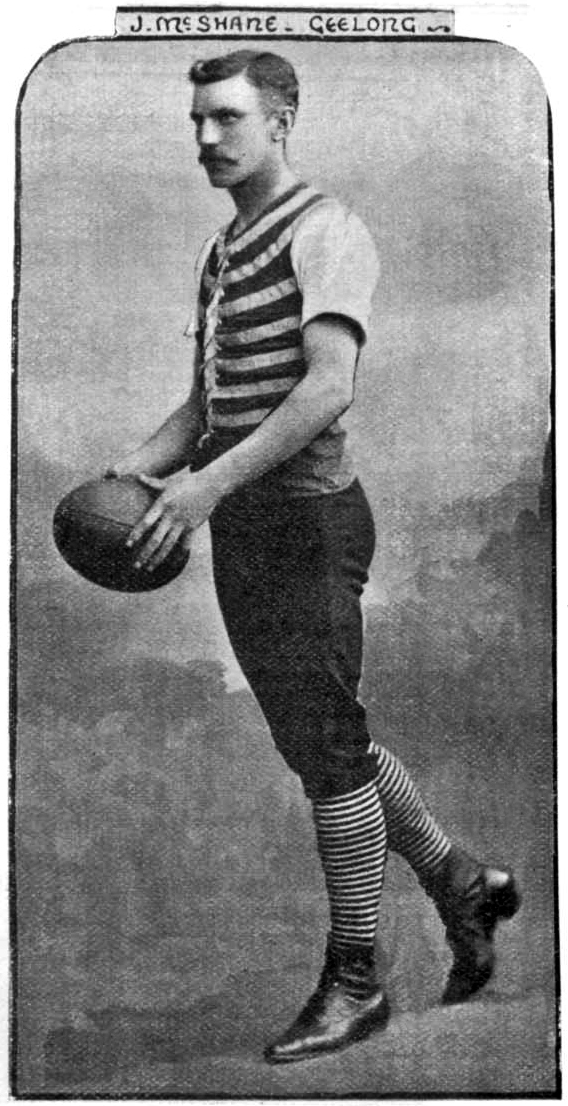

Personal information
- Full name: James McShane
- Born: 28 February 1871; Geelong, Victoria
- Died: 25 October 1946 (aged 75); Hawthorn, Victoria
- Debut: Round 1, 1897, Geelong vs. Essendon, at Corio Oval

Playing career^{1}
Years	Club	Games (Goals)
1897–1901	Geelong	82 (53)
- ^{1} Playing statistics correct to the end of 1901.

James McShane (28 February 1871 – 25 October 1946) was an Australian rules footballer for the Geelong Football Club. McShane was the first player in the VFL/AFL competition to kick ten goals or more in a match when he scored eleven goals against St Kilda in 1899.

His brothers Henry and Joe McShane also played with Geelong, and later at Carlton.
