= John Timothee =

Australian rules footballer

Personal information
- Full name: John Timothee
- Born: 4 February 1870; Melbourne
- Died: 10 December 1901 (aged 31); Melbourne
- Original team: Fitzroy (VFA)

Playing career^{1}
Years	Club	Games (Goals)
1897–98	Melbourne	8 (1)
- ^{1} Playing statistics correct to the end of 1898.

John Timothee (4 February 1870 – 10 December 1901) was an Australian rules footballer who played with Melbourne in the Victorian Football League (VFL).
