= Mick Blake =

Australian rules footballer

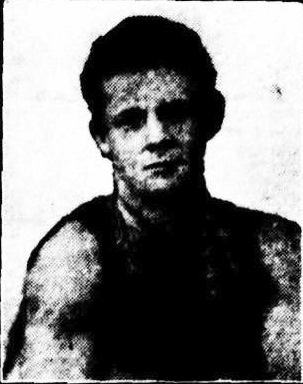

Personal information
- Full name: Michael Patrick Blake
- Born: 13 September 1874; St Kilda, Victoria
- Died: 2 January 1931 (aged 56); St Kilda, Victoria
- Original team: Collegians

Playing career^{1}
Years	Club	Games (Goals)
1897–1899	St Kilda	30 (5)
- ^{1} Playing statistics correct to the end of 1899.

Michael Patrick Blake (13 September 1874 – 2 January 1931) was an Australian rules footballer who played with St Kilda in the Victorian Football League (VFL).

== Biography ==
=== Early life and family ===
Blake was born in St Kilda, Victoria on 13 September 1874, one of 11 children to Irish emigrants John Blake and Ellen Coen, who came from County Galway. He had seven brothers, many of whom were also gifted sportsmen, two of them played in the VFL. A younger brother, George Blake, was a two-time olympic long-distance runner who also appeared in the VFL, for St Kilda and Carlton. James Blake and Tom Blake, both elder brothers, played football for the same two clubs. James, who captained St Kilda, retired by the time the VFL was formed, but Tom continued his career in the VFL. Another brother, Harry Blake, was a prominent cross country runner.

He had three children with wife Holly: Allyn, Thomas and Winifred.

=== Football ===
Recruited from Collegians, Blake started his career with Carlton in the VFA, where he played until transferring to St Kilda in the 1895 season.

At Carlton he had played under the captaincy of his brother Tom and was described by the Sporting Globe as having been one of the formidable ruckmen in the team.

He missed St Kilda's inaugural league game in the 1897 VFL season but was in the side from round two and played 13 games that year, followed by 14 in 1898. Both were winless seasons and he was also in the losing team for his three appearances in 1899, which agonisingly included a two-point loss. He didn't continue in 1900 and finished his VFL career with 30 games and no wins, joint fourth most in the league's history, all ahead of him played for University.

=== Other sports ===
Blake, a member of the Collegian Harriers, was also an amateur athlete like some of his brothers. He first competed in athletics at the Victorian 10-mile cross-country championships in 1891. In addition to athletics and football, Blake was a good enough diver to win the Victorian title, in a field which included Cecil Healy.
