= Bert Rapiport =

Australian rules footballer

Personal information
- Full name: Henry Alexander Rapiport
- Born: 30 September 1865; Melbourne, Victoria Colony, British Empire
- Died: 30 December 1913 (aged 48); St Kilda, Victoria, Australia
- Original team: Normanby
- Weight: 80 kg (176 lb)

Playing career^{1}
Years	Club	Games (Goals)
1897	Fitzroy	3 (1)
- ^{1} Playing statistics correct to the end of 1897.

Henry Alexander "Bert" Rapiport (30 September 1865 – 30 December 1913) was an Australian rules footballer who played for the Fitzroy Football Club in the Victorian Football League (VFL) and South Adelaide and West Adelaide Football Clubs in the South Australian Football Association (SAFA).

In 2015, it was discovered that Rapiport was Jewish, making him the first and one of few Jews to have played senior VFL/AFL football.

== Sources ==
- Holmesby, Russell & Main, Jim (2009). The Encyclopedia of AFL Footballers. 8th ed. Melbourne: Bas Publishing.
