= Ted Heffernan =

Australian rules footballer

Personal information
- Full name: Edward Page Heffernan; (later, Richard Page Heffernan)
- Born: 16 May 1869; Gisborne, Victoria
- Died: 16 May 1904 (aged 35); Princes Hill, Victoria
- Original team: Fitzroy Juniors

Playing career^{1}
Years	Club	Games (Goals)
1894, 1896	Carlton (VFA)	23 (4)
1897	Carlton (VFL)	2 (0)
- ^{1} Playing statistics correct to the end of 1897.

Edward Page Heffernan (16 May 1869 – 16 May 1904) was an Australian rules footballer who played with Carlton in the Victorian Football League (VFL).

== Family ==
The son of Thomas Heffernan (1832–1892), a policeman, and Mary Heffernan (1834–1875), née Minogue, Edward Page Heffernan was born at Gisborne, Victoria on 16 May 1869.

He married Margaret Celia Berwick (1873–1948), later Mrs. William Francis Fuseo, in 1897. They had two daughters.

== Football ==
=== Carlton (VFA) ===
Recruited from Fitzroy Juniors in 1894, he played at least 23 senior games for Carlton in the VFA over three seasons (1894 to 1896).

=== Carlton (VFL) ===
He played 2 senior games for Carlton in the VFL, including the team's first-ever match in the VFL's inaugural season, against Fitzroy, at the Brunswick Street Oval, on 8 May 1897.

== Death ==
He died at Princes Hill on his 35th birthday, 16 May 1904.
