= Alf Bedford =

Australian rules footballer

Personal information
- Full name: Alfred Francis Bedford
- Born: 20 March 1874; Richmond, Victoria
- Died: 17 December 1949 (aged 75); Elwood, Victoria
- Original team: Abbotsford

Playing career^{1}
Years	Club	Games (Goals)
1897	St Kilda	1 (0)
- ^{1} Playing statistics correct to the end of 1897.

Alfred Francis Bedford (20 March 1874 – 17 December 1949) was an Australian rules footballer who played one game for the St Kilda Football Club in the Victorian Football League (VFL).
