= Billy Beggs =

Australian rules footballer

Personal information
- Full name: William Goodwin Beggs
- Born: 13 August 1878; Wickliffe, Victoria
- Died: 4 January 1957 (aged 78); Hamilton, Victoria
- Original team: Cumloden College
- Height: 169 cm (5 ft 7 in)

Playing career^{1}
Years	Club	Games (Goals)
1897–98	St Kilda	13 (0)
- ^{1} Playing statistics correct to the end of 1898.

William Goodwin Beggs (13 August 1878 – 4 January 1957) was an Australian rules footballer who played with St Kilda in the Victorian Football League (VFL).
