= Bill Weir (footballer) =

Australian rules footballer

Personal information
- Full name: William Rich Weir
- Born: 23 August 1874; Fitzroy North, Victoria
- Died: 8 July 1955 (aged 80); Manly, New South Wales
- Original team: Fitzroy Juniors

Playing career^{1}
Years	Club	Games (Goals)
1897–98	Carlton	16 (1)
- ^{1} Playing statistics correct to the end of 1898.

William Rich Weir (23 August 1874 – 8 July 1955) was an Australian rules footballer who played with Carlton in the Victorian Football League (VFL).

After football, he qualified as a pharmacist and commenced work as a chemist in Williamstown. He later enlisted in the Australian Army to fight in the Boer War, and was awarded the Queen's South Africa Medal.
