= Bill Turner (footballer, born 1870) =

Australian rules footballer

Personal information
- Full name: Frederick William Turner
- Born: 30 July 1870; Glen Iris, Victoria
- Died: 21 February 1952 (aged 81); Windsor, Victoria

Playing career^{1}
Years	Club	Games (Goals)
1897	St Kilda	10 (1)
- ^{1} Playing statistics correct to the end of 1897.

Frederick William Turner (30 July 1870 – 21 February 1952) was an Australian rules footballer who played with St Kilda in the Victorian Football League (VFL).

== Family ==
The son of John Charles Turner (1838–1921), and Martha Turner (1848–1921), née Maxwell, Frederick William Turner was born at Glen Iris, Victoria on 30 July 1870.

He married Edith Bowyer Eyre (1867–1939) in December 1898. They had three children: Vera Beatrice Mary Turner (1900–1984), Leslie William Turner (1905-), and Clive Eyre Turner (1907–1912).

He died at Windsor, Victoria on 21 February 1952.
