= Arch Lowe =

Australian rules footballer

Personal information
- Full name: William Archibald Burnside Lowe
- Born: 4 September 1875; Melbourne, Victoria
- Died: 8 April 1942 (aged 66); Brunswick, Victoria
- Original team: Carlisle Imperials

Playing career^{1}
Years	Club	Games (Goals)
1897–1898	St Kilda	6 (1)
- ^{1} Playing statistics correct to the end of 1898.

William Archibald Burnside Lowe (4 September 1875 – 8 April 1942) was an Australian rules footballer who played for the St. Kilda Football Club in the Victorian Football League (VFL).
