= Tom Blake (footballer) =

Australian rules footballer

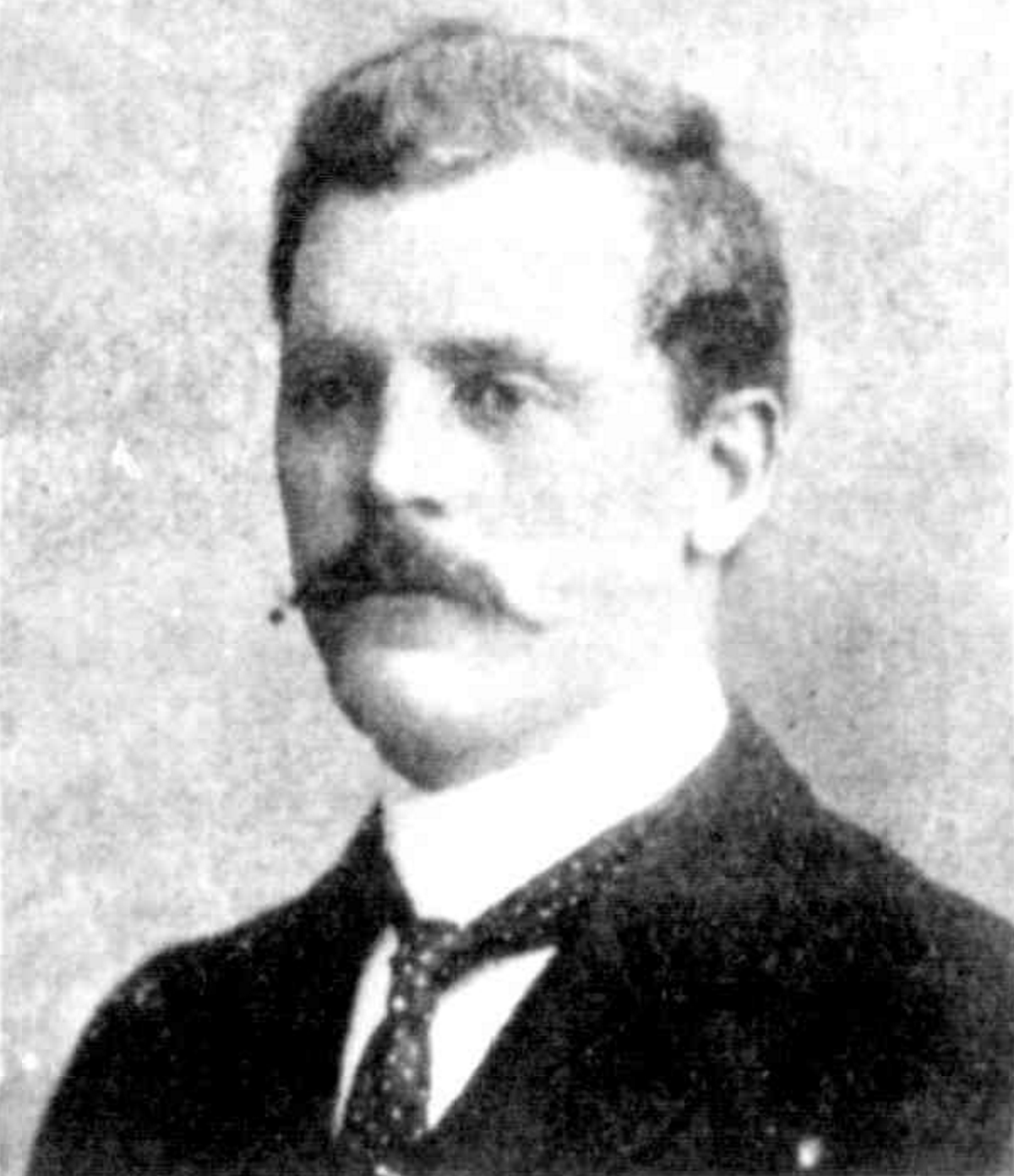
- Blake in 1899

Personal information
- Full name: Thomas Joseph Blake
- Born: 15 July 1872; St Kilda, Victoria
- Died: 3 May 1935 (aged 62); Prahran, Victoria
- Original team: St Kilda Royal

Playing career^{1}
Years	Club	Games (Goals)
1892–1896	Carlton (VFA)	66 (27)
1897	Carlton	4 (0)
1899–1900	St Kilda	24 (4)
- ^{1} Playing statistics correct to the end of 1900.

Thomas Joseph Blake (15 July 1872 – 3 May 1935) was an Australian rules footballer who played with Carlton and St Kilda in the Victorian Football League (VFL).

== Early life and family ==
Tom Blake was born in St Kilda, Victoria on 15 July 1872, the fourth of 11 children born to Irish emigrants John Blake (1824–1886) and Ellen Coen (1843–1921), who came from County Galway.

He had seven brothers, many of whom were also gifted sportsmen, three of them also playing in the VFA/VFL. James, who played for Carlton and captained St Kilda, had retired by the time the VFL was formed. His younger brothers, Mick Blake and George Blake also played for St Kilda and Carlton, and George was also a two-time olympic long-distance runner. Another brother, Harry Blake, was a prominent cross country runner.

The family lived in St Kilda during Tom’s early years and he attended school at the Christian Brothers College in St Kilda.

== Football ==
=== Carlton (VFA) ===
Tom Blake began his football career with the St Kilda Royals junior team before commencing his senior football career in 1892 playing as a follower for Carlton in the Victorian Football Association. Blake was a natural leader and served as vice-captain in 1894 before assuming the captaincy of Carlton during 1895 and 1896.

=== Carlton (VFL) ===
Blake relinquished the captaincy to Jimmy Aitken after the club's entrance to the VFL but continued to play with the club. Carlton lost the first five games of the season but then defeated St Kilda in round 6, which would prove to be Tom Blake’s final game for the club. He injured his ankle while competing in a cross-country running event and did not play again that year.

=== St Kilda (VFL) ===
Over a year after leaving Carlton, St Kilda requested Blake’s experience after failing to win a match in the 1898 season. He went on to play 24 games with St Kilda across two seasons before retiring as a footballer.

== Athletics ==
Tom Blake was a noted cross-country runner in the 1890s, twice winning the Victorian State Cross Country (10 mile) Championship, in 1893 and 1895. He later coached his younger brother George, who was a champion long-distance runner and represented Australia at the 1906 Intercalated Games and 1908 Summer Olympics.

== Later life ==
Blake was a keen sportsman throughout his life, taking an interest in swimming, yachting and golf in his later years.

Thomas Joseph Blake died on 3 May 1935 and is buried at Brighton General Cemetery.
