= Cafferty =

Cafferty is a surname, and may refer to:

- Bernard Cafferty (born 1934), British Chess Master and Writer
- Jack Cafferty (born 1942), American CNN commentator
- John Cafferty (born 1950), American musician

== Fictional characters ==
- 'Big Ger' Cafferty, fictional character in novels by Scottish author Ian Rankin
- Mitch Cafferty, Jericho character
