= Herman Hellwig =

Australian rules footballer

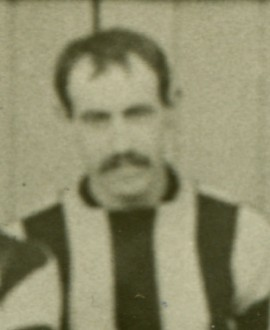

Personal information
- Full name: Herman Otto Hellwig
- Born: 30 June 1875; Northcote, Victoria
- Died: 5 August 1952 (aged 77); Oakleigh, Victoria
- Original team: Preston
- Height: 179 cm (5 ft 10 in)
- Weight: 79 kg (174 lb)

Playing career^{1}
Years	Club	Games (Goals)
1893–94	North Melbourne (VFA)	8 (0)
1895	Carlton (VFA)	1 (0)
1897–99	Collingwood	21 (3)
- ^{1} Playing statistics correct to the end of 1899.

Herman Otto Hellwig (30 June 1875 – 5 August 1952) was an Australian rules footballer who played with Collingwood in the Victorian Football League (VFL).

== Family ==
The son of German immigrants Emil Waldemar Hellwig (1838–1902) and Johanna Auguster Hellwig, nee Meisgeier, (1837–1927), Herman Otto Hellwig was born in Northcote, Victoria on 30 June 1875.

Hellwig married Frances Jean "Fanny" Forrester Jubb (1874–1935) in 1896 and they had four children together. Their third child, Gordon Hellwig, was a VFL footballer for Fitzroy.

== Football ==
Hellwig played for both North Melbourne and Carlton in the Victorian Football Association prior to his VFL appearances with Collingwood.

In 1896 Hellwig played for Preston in the Victorian Junior Football Association.

Hellwig returned to senior ranks when he transferred to Collingwood in the 1897 season, making a total of 21 appearances before transferring back to Preston in the middle of the 1899 season.

From 1900 Hellwig played for Northcote in the Victorian Junior Football Association. Hellwig continued playing for Northcote when they joined the Victorian Football Association in 1908.

In 1909 Herman Helwig was coach of the Preston District football team.

== Death ==
Hellwig died at Oakleigh Community hospital on 5 August 1952 and was cremated at Springvale Botanical Cemetery.
