= Harry Gower =

Australian rules footballer

Personal information
- Full name: Harry Carew Gower
- Born: 24 December 1874; Mount Barker, South Australia
- Died: 2 October 1930 (aged 55); Brighton, Victoria

Playing career^{1}
Years	Club	Games (Goals)
1897	St Kilda	2 (0)
- ^{1} Playing statistics correct to the end of 1897.

Harry Carew Gower (24 December 1874 – 2 October 1930) was an Australian rules footballer who played with St Kilda in the Victorian Football League (VFL).
