= Oscar Manchester =

Australian rules footballer

Personal information
- Full name: Oscar Henry Manchester
- Born: 14 April 1878; Preston, Victoria
- Died: 20 February 1958 (aged 79); Sunbury, Victoria

Playing career^{1}
Years	Club	Games (Goals)
1897–1898	Carlton	14 (3)
- ^{1} Playing statistics correct to the end of 1898.

Oscar Henry Manchester (14 April 1878 – 20 February 1958) was an Australian Rules footballer. He played 14 games for Carlton in the VFL between 1897 and 1898 and kicked three goals.

His debut match was the 1897 Round 7 clash with Collingwood.
