= Sam Reid (footballer, born 1872) =

Australian rules footballer

Personal information
- Full name: Samuel Alexander Reid
- Born: 17 June 1872; Ravenswood, Victoria
- Original team: Hawthorn (VJFA)

Playing career^{1}
Years	Club	Games (Goals)
1897	Carlton	3 (0)
- ^{1} Playing statistics correct to the end of 1897.

Samuel Alexander Reid (born 17 June 1872) was an Australian rules footballer who played with Carlton in the Victorian Football League (VFL).
