= Jack Monohan Jr. =

Australian rules footballer, born 1902

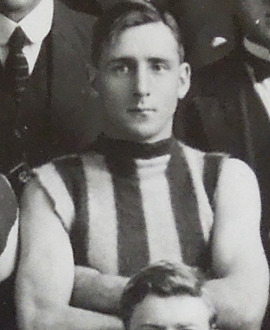
- Monohan during his Collingwood career

Personal information
- Full name: John Richard Monohan
- Born: 9 September 1902; Collingwood, Victoria
- Died: 1 February 1987 (aged 84); Greensborough, Victoria
- Original team: Collingwood District
- Height: 185 cm (6 ft 1 in)
- Weight: 81 kg (179 lb)

Playing career
Years	Club	Games (Goals)
1924–1925	Collingwood	7 (3)
1928–1933	Preston (VFA)	111 (32)

Jack Monohan Jr. (9 September 1902 – 1 February 1987) was an Australian rules footballer who played two seasons for Collingwood in the Victorian Football League.

== Playing career ==
=== Collingwood ===
Monohan, son of the Collingwood half-back Jack Monohan, played seven games over the 1924 and 1925 VFL seasons.

=== Preston ===
By the late 1920s Monohan had crossed to Preston in the Victorian Football Association.
