= George Blake (athlete) =

Australian rules footballer and long-distance runner

Personal information
- Full name: George Bernard Blake
- Born: 4 September 1878; St Kilda, Victoria
- Died: 6 February 1946 (aged 67); Cheltenham, Victoria
- Original team: St Kilda College

Playing career^{1}
Years	Club	Games (Goals)
1897–98, 1903	St Kilda	7 (0)
1905	Carlton	1 (0)
Total		8 (0)
- ^{1} Playing statistics correct to the end of 1905.

George Bernard Blake (4 September 1878 – 6 February 1946) was an Australian sportsman who competed in the 1906 Intercalated Games and 1908 Summer Olympics as a long distance runner. He also played Australian rules football with St Kilda and Carlton in the Victorian Football League (VFL).

== Biography ==
Blake, the son of Irish immigrants, had 10 siblings. One of them, Tom Blake, was also a league footballer and distance runner of note. Another, Mick Blake, also played in the VFL.

In 1897, Blake made three appearances for St Kilda in the inaugural VFL season. He played three more games in 1898 and then, due to his running career, had to wait five years for his seventh and final league game with St Kilda. He returned for the 1905 to play one more game, this time at Carlton.

A national record holder for the 10 miles, Blake was one of Australia's leading long distance runners of the early 1900s and was a member of the East Melbourne Harriers Athletic Club. He went to Auckland in 1901 for the Australasian Championships and finished second in the three miles but was the first placed Australian.

He was one of just four Australians to go to Athens in 1906 for the Olympics. His first event was the Men's 1,500 metres, where he finished far back in his heat and missed the final. The longer distances were more to his liking, and in the Men's five mile race, he placed sixth out of 28 competitors.

Blake's best performance of the 1906 Games was in the Men's Marathon, where he was the only athlete from the southern hemisphere to compete. He led the race at the 24 km mark, by a distance of 1200 metres, but succumbed to cramp. Blake was still able to finish the race and finished sixth, in a time of three hours, nine minutes and thirty five seconds. He was involved in a sprint for the finish with Greece's Ioannis Alepous, who beat him to the line by ten seconds. His placing was not bettered by an Australian at an Olympic Games until Robert de Castella finished fifth in 1984. (Note: Although considered to be at the time; the 1906 Games are no longer recognised by the IOC as being an "Olympic" Games. They are instead referred to as the Intercalated Games, as they took place outside of the usual four year cycle.)

Blake made the long journey to Europe again two years later to participate in the London Olympics, this time competing for Australasia. He narrowly missed out on making the Men's Five Mile final after finishing third in his heat, and only the top two qualified. He couldn't repeat his performance from Athens in the marathon and didn't finish the race. He could, however, feel aggrieved as his retirement after five and a half miles was due to an injury sustained when the bicycle riding attendant collided with him while giving out refreshments.
