= Henry McShane =

Australian rules footballer

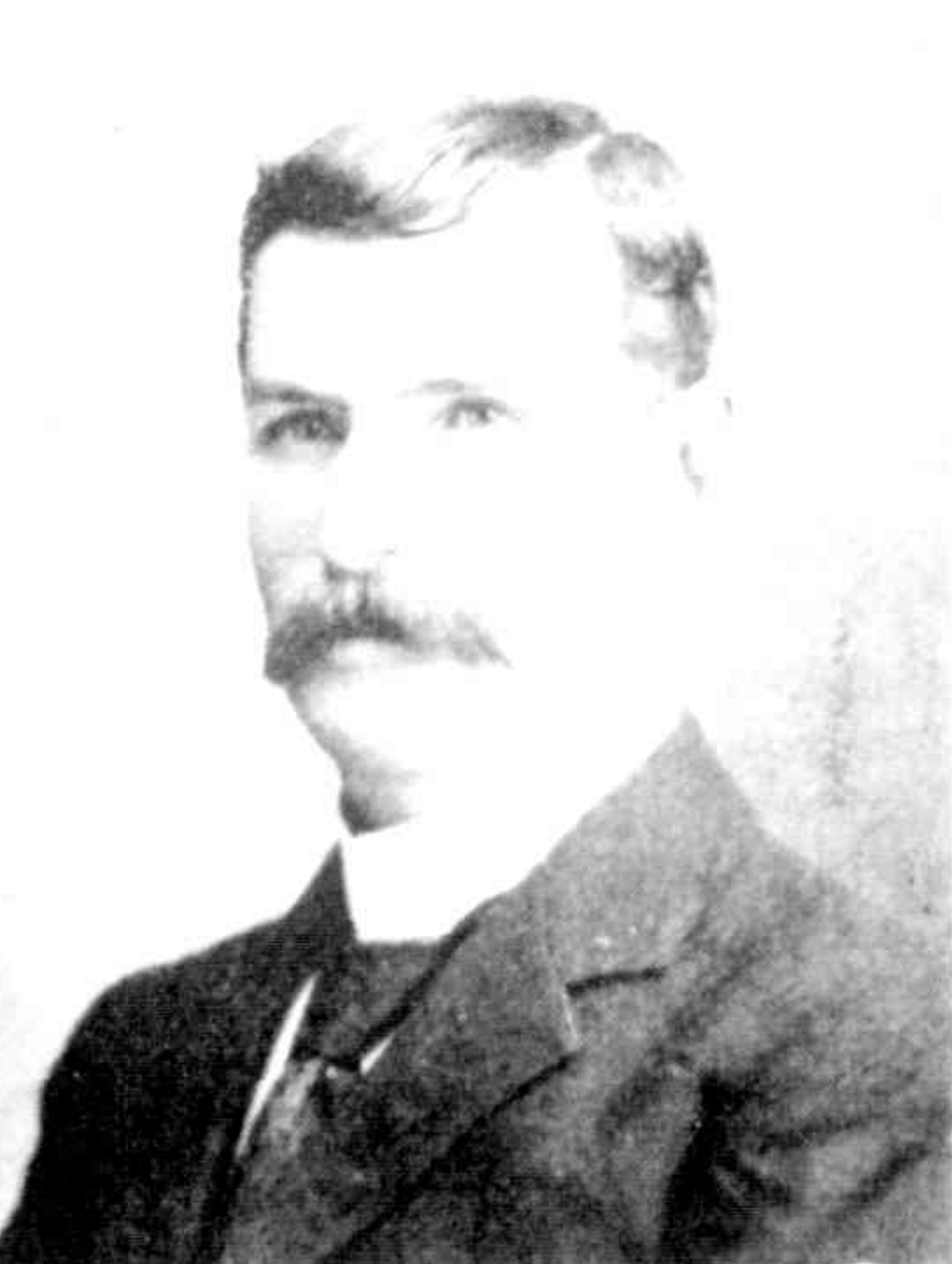
- McShane in 1899

Personal information
- Full name: Henry John McShane
- Born: 9 February 1873; Geelong
- Died: 1 December 1912 (aged 39); Melbourne
- Original team: Geelong (VFA)

Playing career^{1}
Years	Club	Games (Goals)
1894–96	Geelong (VFA)	47 (45)
1897–98	Geelong	31 (1)
1899–1904	Carlton	82 (28)
Total		160 (74)
- ^{1} Playing statistics correct to the end of 1904.

Henry John McShane (9 February 1873 – 1 December 1912) was an Australian rules footballer who played with Geelong and Carlton in the Victorian Football Association (VFA) and the Victorian Football League (VFL).

His brothers Jim and Joe also played VFL football with Geelong and Carlton.
