= Ernie Dunne =

Australian rules footballer

Personal information
- Full name: Ernest Albert Dunne
- Born: 20 July 1873; Kilmore, Victoria
- Died: 15 September 1931 (aged 58); Prahran, Victoria

Playing career^{1}
Years	Club	Games (Goals)
1897–98	St Kilda	13 (4)
- ^{1} Playing statistics correct to the end of 1898.

Ernest Albert Dunne (20 July 1873 – 15 September 1931) was an Australian rules footballer who played with St Kilda in the Victorian Football League (VFL).
