= Tom Crawford (Australian footballer) =

Australian rules footballer

Personal information
- Full name: Thomas Bruce Crawford
- Born: 2 September 1879; South Melbourne, Victoria
- Died: 24 February 1969 (aged 89); Malvern East, Victoria

Playing career^{1}
Years	Club	Games (Goals)
1897	Melbourne	1 (0)
- ^{1} Playing statistics correct to the end of 1897.

Thomas Bruce Crawford (2 September 1879 – 24 February 1969) was an Australian rules footballer who played with Melbourne in the Victorian Football League (VFL).
