= Mick Peppard =

Australian rules footballer

Personal information
- Full name: Michael Carroll Peppard
- Born: 28 April 1877; Collingwood, Victoria
- Died: 30 January 1939 (aged 61); Fitzroy North, Victoria
- Original teams: Fitzroy Juniors, Melbourne Juniors
- Height: 179 cm (5 ft 10 in)
- Weight: 82 kg (181 lb)
- Positions: Half back, follower

Playing career^{1}
Years	Club	Games (Goals)
1897	Fitzroy	5 (0)
1900–03	Essendon	42 (10)
Total		47 (10)
- ^{1} Playing statistics correct to the end of 1903.

Mick Peppard (28 April 1877 – 30 January 1939) was an Australian rules footballer who played with Fitzroy and Essendon in the Victorian Football League (VFL).

== Sources ==
- Holmesby, Russell & Main, Jim (2009). The Encyclopedia of AFL Footballers. 8th ed. Melbourne: Bas Publishing.
- Mick Peppard's playing statistics from AFL Tables
- Essendon Football Club profile
