= Tom McNamara (footballer, born 1874) =

Australian rules footballer

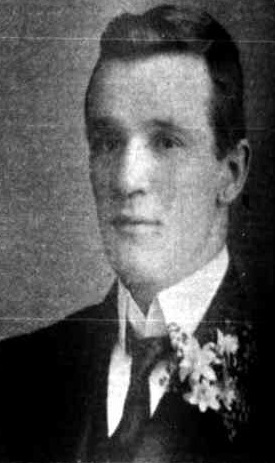
- McNamara in 1899

Personal information
- Full name: Thomas Patrick McNamara
- Born: 3 June 1874; North Melbourne, Victoria
- Died: 8 March 1936 (aged 61); Northcote, Victoria
- Original team: St Mary's North Melbourne
- Position: Defence

Playing career^{1}
Years	Club	Games (Goals)
1897–99, 1901–04	St Kilda	83 (1)
- ^{1} Playing statistics correct to the end of 1904.

Tom McNamara (3 June 1874 – 8 March 1936) was an Australian rules footballer who played with St Kilda in the Victorian Football League (VFL).
