= Tom Paterson (footballer) =

Australian rules footballer

Personal information
- Full name: Thomas Paterson
- Born: 26 October 1874; Northcote, Victoria
- Died: 11 September 1945 (aged 70); Richmond, Victoria
- Original team: Preston
- Height: 182 cm (6 ft 0 in)
- Weight: 82 kg (181 lb)

Playing career^{1}
Years	Club	Games (Goals)
1897	Collingwood	4 (0)
- ^{1} Playing statistics correct to the end of 1897.

Thomas Paterson (26 October 1874 – 11 September 1945) was an Australian rules footballer who played with Collingwood in the Victorian Football League (VFL).
