= Mick O'Hagan =

Australian rules footballer

Personal information
- Full name: Michael Joseph O'Hagan
- Born: 22 January 1878; Carlton, Victoria
- Original team: University

Playing career^{1}
Years	Club	Games (Goals)
1897	St Kilda	1 (0)
- ^{1} Playing statistics correct to the end of 1897.

Michael Joseph O'Hagan (born 22 January 1878, date of death unknown) was an Australian rules footballer who played with St Kilda in the Victorian Football League (VFL).

== Family ==
The son of John O'Hagan (1845–1882), and Mary Ann O'Hagan (1846–1891), née Creed, Michael Joseph O'Hagan was born in Carlton, Victoria on 22 January 1878.

== Education ==
O'Hagan was educated at the Christian Brothers College, in Victoria Parade.

In 1895, he was studying pharmacy at the University of Melbourne.

== Football ==
O'Hagan played VFL football for St Kilda on one occasion, against Essendon, at the East Melbourne Cricket Ground, on 24 July 1897 — Essendon thrashed St Kilda 13.16 (94) to 0.3 (3).
