= Reg Stewart (Australian footballer) =

Australian rules footballer (1878–1952)

Personal information
- Full name: Oscar Reginald Stewart
- Born: 4 September 1878; Brighton, Victoria
- Died: 17 January 1952 (aged 73); Manly, New South Wales
- Original team: Scotch College

Playing career^{1}
Years	Club	Games (Goals)
1897–1898	St Kilda	15 (7)
- ^{1} Playing statistics correct to the end of 1898.

Oscar Reginald Stewart (4 September 1878 – 17 January 1952) was an Australian rules footballer who played with St Kilda in the Victorian Football League (VFL).

Stewart kicked six goals from 13 appearances in the 1897 VFL season, which was enough to share the year's goal-kicking honours with teammate Bill Ahern. He played just twice the following year and finished his VFL career with no wins.

He had a brother, Ernest, who played some games with him at St Kilda in 1897.
