= Jerry McGrath =

Australian rules footballer

Personal information
- Full name: Jeremiah McGrath
- Born: 25 December 1874; Warrenheip, Victoria
- Died: 27 September 1932 (aged 57); Ballarat East, Victoria
- Original team: Collegians

Playing career^{1}
Years	Club	Games (Goals)
1897–1903	St Kilda	21 (0)
- ^{1} Playing statistics correct to the end of 1903.

Jerry McGrath (25 December 1874 – 27 September 1932) was an Australian rules footballer who played with St Kilda in the Victorian Football League (VFL).
