= Alb Thomas =

Australian rules footballer (1872–1957)

Personal information
- Full name: Alban Howell Causse Thomas
- Born: 9 February 1872; Emerald Hill
- Died: 4 November 1957 (aged 85); Ascot Vale, Victoria
- Original team: Albert Park

Playing career^{1}
Years	Club	Games (Goals)
1897	South Melbourne	1 (0)
- ^{1} Playing statistics correct to the end of 1897.

Alban Howell Causse Thomas (9 February 1872 – 4 November 1957) was an Australian rules footballer who played for the South Melbourne Football Club in the Victorian Football League (VFL). Thomas was recruited to South Melbourne at the beginning of the 1897 VFL season along with his brother Gilligan. They had both played for Albert Park in the Victorian Junior Football Association (VJFA) the season prior and won the VJFA premiership that year.
