= Bill Ahern (footballer, born 1874) =

Australian rules footballer (1874–1920)

Personal information
- Full name: William Thomas Ahern
- Born: 25 June 1874; Collingwood, Victoria
- Died: 27 January 1920 (aged 45); Stratford, Victoria
- Original team: Melbourne Grammar
- Height: 180 cm (5 ft 11 in)
- Weight: 76 kg (168 lb)

Playing career^{1}
Years	Club	Games (Goals)
1897	St Kilda	12 (6)
- ^{1} Playing statistics correct to the end of 1897.

William Thomas Ahern (25 June 1874 – 27 January 1920) was an Australian rules footballer who played with St Kilda in the Victorian Football League (VFL).

== Family ==
The son of Patrick Ahern and Elizabeth Caroline Ahern (1840–1906), née White, William Thomas Ahern was born in Collingwood on 25 June 1874.

He married Annie Amelia Alberta Spry (1872–1962) in 1899.

== Education ==
He was educated at Scotch College (1887) and at Melbourne Grammar School (1888–1894). He was captain of Melbourne Grammar's football and cricket teams.

== Football ==
He had already played for two Victorian Football Association (VFA) clubs before joining St Kilda in 1896. He began his VFA career at Fitzroy in 1893; he then crossed to Melbourne in 1895.

He made his VFL debut for St Kilda in the opening round of the inaugural VFL season in 1897 and played a total of 12 games. Along with Reg Stewart, Ahern was St Kilda's joint leading goalkicker that year, with six goals.

== Death ==
He died at Stratford, Victoria, on 27 January 1920.
