= Bobby Walsh =

Australian rules footballer

Personal information
- Full name: Robert John Walsh
- Born: 25 June 1877; Heathcote, Victoria
- Died: 20 August 1910 (aged 33); South Yarra, Victoria
- Original team: Footscray (VFA)

Playing career^{1}
Years	Club	Games (Goals)
1897–1902	Carlton	78 (21)
- ^{1} Playing statistics correct to the end of 1902.

Robert John Walsh (25 June 1877 – 20 August 1910) was an Australian rules footballer who played with Carlton in the Victorian Football League (VFL).
