= Emery Staines =

Australian rules footballer

Personal information
- Full name: Emery James Staines
- Born: 27 July 1874; Collingwood, Victoria
- Died: 28 July 1959 (aged 85); Fremantle, Western Australia
- Original team: Williamstown

Playing career^{1}
Years	Club	Games (Goals)
1897	St Kilda	1 (0)
- ^{1} Playing statistics correct to the end of 1897.

Emery James Staines (27 July 1874 – 28 July 1959) was an Australian rules footballer who played with St Kilda in the Victorian Football League (VFL).
