= Jack Monohan Sr. =

Australian rules footballer and umpire

Jack Monohan
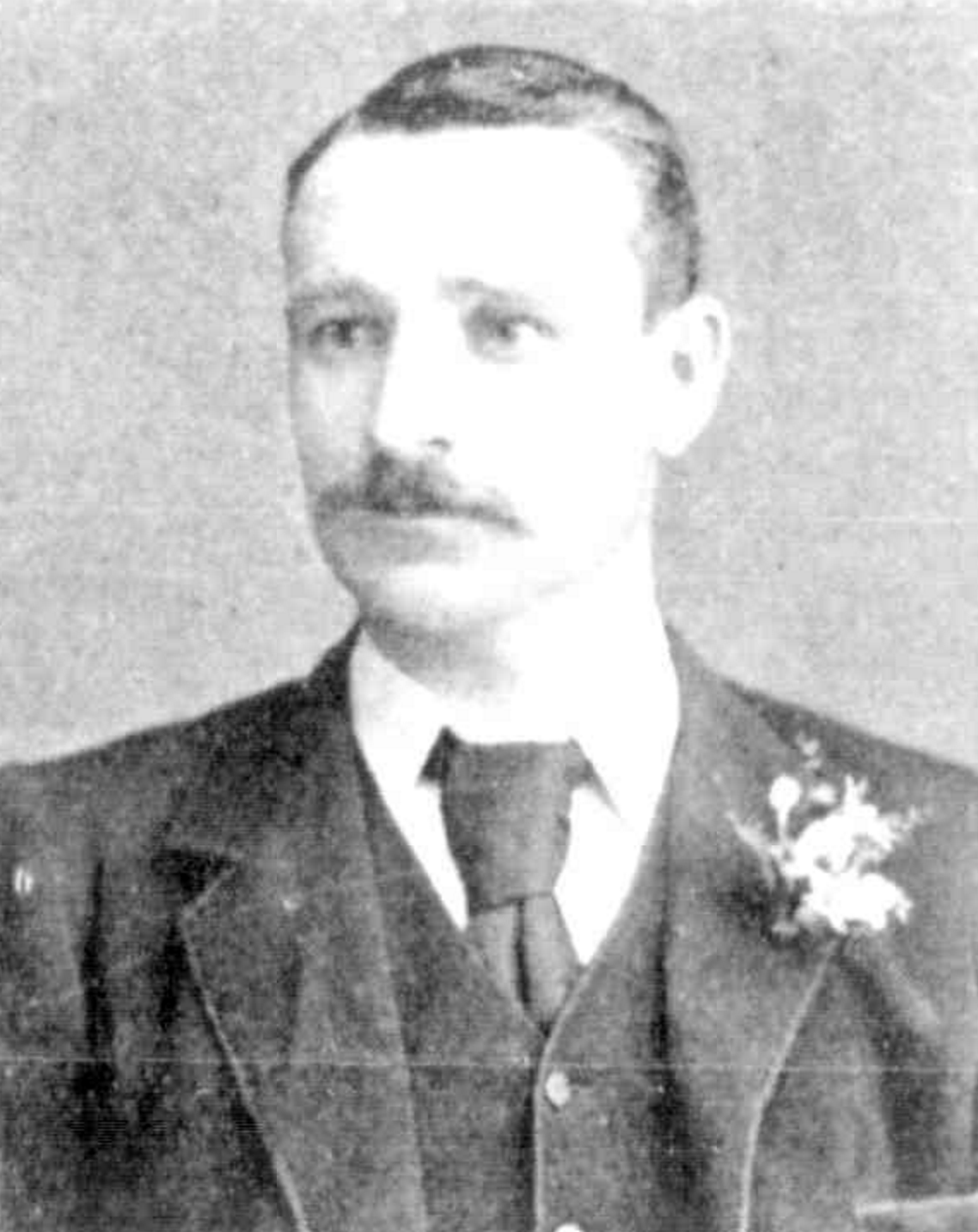
- Monohan in 1899

Personal information
- Full name: John James Monohan
- Born: 21 August 1873; Yan Yean, Victoria
- Died: 27 August 1934 (aged 61); Collingwood, Victoria
- Original team: Collingwood Juniors
- Height: 184 cm (6 ft 0 in)
- Weight: 82 kg (181 lb)
- Position: Half-back

Playing career^{1}
Years	Club	Games (Goals)	
1893–1896	Collingwood (VFA)	65 (2)	
1897–1907	Collingwood (VFL)	171 (7)	
Total		236 (9)	

Umpiring career
Years	League	Role	Games
1913–1926	VFL	Goal umpire	181
- ^{1} Playing statistics correct to the end of 1907.

Career highlights
- VFA premiership player: 1896; VFL premiership player: 1903

John James Monohan (21 August 1873 – 27 August 1934) was an Australian rules footballer who played for the Collingwood Football Club in the Victorian Football League (VFL).

== Playing career ==
Monohan was part of Collingwood's inaugural VFL season, having played four seasons for the club when they were in the Victorian Football Association (VFA). Renowned for his high marking, he was used mainly as a follower and half back.

He was a premiership player with Collingwood in 1896 and 1903, but missed the 1901 Grand Final loss (despite playing every game that season) and the 1902 premiership through injury.

Monohan also captained the Victorian interstate football team between 1903 and 1906. He was the first Collingwood player to play 200 games for the club, with his 236 career games being a club record until it was broken by James "Jock" McHale in the 1915 Grand Final.

His son, Jack Monohan Jr., played for Collingwood in the 1920s.

Monohan was inducted into the Collingwood Football Club Hall of Fame in 2012, and he was the 53rd Collingwood player to receive the honour.

== Umpiring career ==
Monohan became a VFL goal umpire in 1913. After umpiring 181 VFL senior matches and three Grand Finals, Monohan retired as an umpire in 1926.
