= Jack O'Hara =

Australian rules footballer

Personal information
- Full name: John James O'Hara
- Born: 24 September 1866; South Melbourne, Victoria
- Died: 28 August 1931 (aged 64); South Melbourne, Victoria

Playing career^{1}
Years	Club	Games (Goals)
1898	South Melbourne	2 (1)
- ^{1} Playing statistics correct to the end of 1898.

John James O'Hara (24 September 1866 – 28 August 1931) was an Australian rules footballer who played with South Melbourne in the Victorian Football League (VFL).
