= Joe Kerrigan (footballer) =

Australian rules footballer

Personal information
- Full name: John Thomas Kerrigan
- Born: 28 February 1864; Richmond, Victoria
- Died: 28 November 1942 (aged 78); Fitzroy, Victoria
- Original team: Fitzroy (VFA)

Playing career^{1}
Years	Club	Games (Goals)
1897–99	Fitzroy	5 (1)
- ^{1} Playing statistics correct to the end of 1899.

John Thomas "Joe" Kerrigan (28 February 1864 – 28 November 1942) was an Australian rules footballer who played with Fitzroy in the Victorian Football League (VFL). He was the first born player in VFL/AFL history.
