= Fred Stewart (Australian footballer) =

Australian rules footballer

Personal information
- Full name: Frederick George Stewart
- Born: 11 April 1875; Melbourne, Victoria
- Died: 21 December 1941 (aged 66); Prahran, Victoria

Playing career^{1}
Years	Club	Games (Goals)
1897	St Kilda	6 (0)
- ^{1} Playing statistics correct to the end of 1897.

Frederick George Stewart (11 April 1875 – 21 December 1941) was an Australian rules footballer who played with St Kilda in the Victorian Football League (VFL).
