= Arthur Gibbs (footballer) =

Australian rules footballer

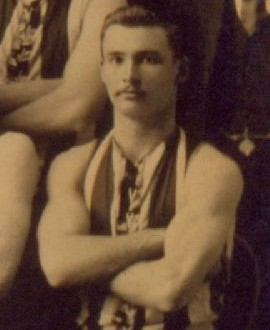
- Gibbs in 1896 during his Collingwood career in the VFA

Personal information
- Full name: Arthur Elliott Gibbs
- Born: 28 December 1872; Woodend, Victoria
- Died: 8 August 1940 (aged 67); Hawthorn, Victoria
- Original team: Collingwood Juniors
- Height: 174 cm (5 ft 9 in)
- Weight: 62 kg (137 lb)

Playing career^{1}
Years	Club	Games (Goals)
1896	Collingwood (VFA)	13 (0)
1897–1898	Collingwood	22 (0)
- ^{1} Playing statistics correct to the end of 1898.

Arthur Elliott Gibbs (28 December 1872 – 8 August 1940) was an Australian rules footballer who played for the Collingwood Football Club in the Victorian Football League (VFL).
