= Home Delivery (short story) =

- Short story by Stephen King
- Country: United States
- Language: English
- Genre: Science fiction horror comedy short story

Publication
- Published in: Book of the Dead (1st release), Nightmares & Dreamscapes
- Publication type: Anthology
- Media type: Print (Paperback)

"Home Delivery" is a short story by American writer Stephen King. It was first published in the zombie anthology Book of the Dead (1989) and later included in King's short story collection Nightmares & Dreamscapes (1993).

== Plot ==
The protagonist of the story is Maddie Pace, a timid and indecisive young woman who lives on a small island named Gennesault (or "Jenny"), off the coast of Maine. Maddie is both pregnant and a widow, having recently lost her husband in a fishing boat accident.

After a scattering of initial outbreaks, dead bodies all over the world begin to reanimate en masse and attack the living. The source of the phenomenon is eventually traced to "Star Wormwood", a bizarre alien construct orbiting above the ozone layer at the Earth's South Pole. A space shuttle under joint American-Soviet authority visits the site and promptly meets with disaster. After further attempts to destroy the object fail, the zombie plague spreads and civilization collapses.

Jenny's inhabitants gather up all the available firearms to prepare for their own attack, which all too soon erupts from the island's small cemetery. The island's men are forced to destroy their undead loved ones as they crawl out of their graves. The still-moving pieces of the reanimated corpses are then burned with kerosene and the remains plowed underground by a bulldozer. Frank Daggett, the elderly man who did most of the organizing of the successful defense, suffers a fatal heart attack and has himself blasted to pieces so he won't reanimate.

While she is hearing about the battle at the cemetery from her neighbor, Maddie recalls her own confrontation with the animated corpse of her husband, come back to get her from the bottom of the sea. She succeeds in destroying him/it and faces the future, however grim, with renewed confidence and hope.

== Version changes ==
There are some differences between the versions published in The Book of the Dead and Nightmares and Dreamscapes, none of which are significant to the plot. For example, the space expedition in the original publication was U.S.-Soviet; it is changed to U.S.-Chinese in later publication to reflect the end of the Cold War.

== Adaptations ==
A 2005 animated short of the story was directed by Elio Quiroga and produced by Guillermo del Toro. It was screened at RiverRun International Film Festival. The short is a Dollar Baby film.

"Home Delivery" has been adapted by artist Glenn Chadbourne for the book The Secretary of Dreams, a collection of comics based on King's short fiction released by Cemetery Dance in December 2006.

In September 2009, the story was optioned as a theatrical release and was in pre-production, with John and Paul Buckholts, of Our Thing Productions, writing the screenplay and Japanese director Ryuhei Kitamura scheduled to direct.

== Reception ==
George Beahm said that the story is "quintessential King" and that King writes the characters with "considerable skill and sympathy".

== See also ==
- Stephen King short fiction bibliography
