= Harry Purdy (footballer, born 1867) =

Australian rules footballer

Personal information
- Full name: Henry Robert Purdy
- Born: 28 August 1867; Learmonth, Victoria
- Died: 26 November 1922 (aged 55); Gardenvale, Victoria
- Original team: South Ballarat
- Position: Rover

Playing career^{1}
Years	Club	Games (Goals)
1885	South Ballarat	13 (0)
1886-1890, 1892–1896	South Melbourne (VFA)	124 (0)
1897–1901	South Melbourne (VFL)	72 (16)
Total		209 (16)
- ^{1} Playing statistics correct to the end of 1901.

Career highlights
- VFA premiership player 1888-1890

Henry Robert Purdy (28 August 1867 – 26 November 1922) was an Australian rules footballer who played with South Melbourne in the Victorian Football Association (VFA) and the Victorian Football League (VFL).

== Family ==
The son of William Frederick Purdy (1834-1918), and Hannah Purdy (1835-1931), née Coates, Henry Robert Purdy was born at Learmonth, Victoria on 28 August 1867.

He married Louisa Hannah Seeley (1870–1937), at South Melbourne, on 27 February 1895. Their son, Henry Frederick Burnett Purdy (1898-1978), also known as "Harry", played nine games for South Melbourne in the 1910s.

== Football ==
Originally from the South Ballarat Football Club, he moved to Melbourne in 1886.

The knee injury that he sustained in a charity game, against Fitzroy, on 20 September 1890, meant that he was unable to play in the 1891 season.

Purdy later played for Brighton in the Metropolitan Junior Football Association (MJFA), including in the club's 1902 grand final loss to Collegians.

== Death ==
He died at Gardenvale, Victoria on 26 November 1922.
