= Fred Sheahan =

Australian rules footballer

Personal information
- Full name: Frederick Michael Sheahan
- Born: 5 September 1870; Melbourne
- Died: 29 December 1946 (aged 76); East Melbourne, Victoria

Playing career^{1}
Years	Club	Games (Goals)
1897	Melbourne	16 (0)
- ^{1} Playing statistics correct to the end of 1897.

Frederick Michael Sheahan (5 September 1870 – 29 December 1946) was an Australian rules footballer who played with Melbourne in the Victorian Football League (VFL).
