= Alex Murdoch =

Australian rules footballer

Personal information
- Full name: Alexander Murdoch
- Born: 25 June 1875; South Melbourne, Victoria
- Died: 13 June 1958 (aged 82); Prahran, Victoria

Playing career^{1}
Years	Club	Games (Goals)
1897	Melbourne	1 (0)
- ^{1} Playing statistics correct to the end of 1897.

Alexander Murdoch (25 June 1875 – 13 June 1958) was an Australian rules footballer who played for the Melbourne Football Club in the Victorian Football League (VFL).
