= Jim H. Goonan =

Australian rules footballer (1873–1950)

Jim Goonan
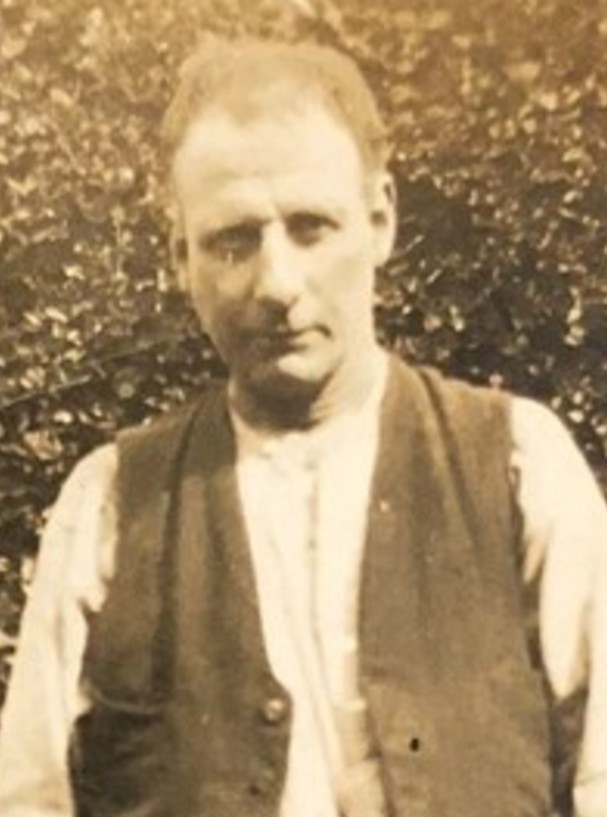
- Goonan pictured in the 20th century

Personal information
- Full name: James H. Goonan
- Born: 26 July 1873; North Melbourne, Victoria
- Died: 25 July 1950 (aged 76); Parkville, Victoria

Playing career^{1}
Years	Club	Games (Goals)
1897	Carlton	2 (0)
- ^{1} Playing statistics correct to the end of 1897.

James H. Goonan (26 July 1873 – 25 July 1950) was an Australian rules footballer who played with Carlton in the Victorian Football League (VFL).

His son Jimmy Goonan also played for Carlton in the 1920s.
