= Simon McCaffery =

American author of speculative fiction (born 1963)

Simon McCaffery (born 1963) is an American author of speculative fiction. Trained as a journalist and magazine editor, he was an Honorable Mention recipient in the L. Ron Hubbard Writers of the Future contest twice before he began publishing short fiction in a variety of professional science fiction, horror and mystery publications in the 1990s, including Alfred Hitchcock's Mystery Magazine, Tomorrow SF (edited by Algis Budrys), and Space and Time. He was a contributor in the anthology, Other Worlds Than These, edited by John Joseph Adams, alongside authors Stephen King and Ian McDonald. His fiction has also been collected in anthologies including the "Book of the Dead" series edited by Splatterpunk authors John Mason Skipp and Craig Spector (Still Dead and Mondo Zombie), 100 Wicked Little Witch Stories, ''Mondo Zombie", and The Haunted Hour.

He also served as president of the Oklahoma Science Fiction Writers in Tulsa, Okla., and edited the monthly newsletter, Son of GPIC, for a number of years.
