= Jim McCoy =

Australian rules footballer

Personal information
- Full name: James John McCoy
- Born: 29 August 1875; St Kilda, Victoria
- Died: 8 February 1913 (aged 37); Rockdale, New South Wales

Playing career^{1}
Years	Club	Games (Goals)
1897	Melbourne	1 (0)
- ^{1} Playing statistics correct to the end of 1897.

James John McCoy (29 August 1875 – 8 February 1913) was an Australian rules footballer who played with Melbourne in the Victorian Football League (VFL).
