= Jim Caffery =

Australian rules footballer

Personal information
- Full name: James Francis Caffery
- Born: 7 May 1872; Carlton, Victoria
- Died: 8 June 1918 (aged 46); East Melbourne, Victoria
- Original team: Rainbow
- Height: 183 cm (6 ft 0 in)
- Weight: 88 kg (194 lb)

Playing career^{1}
Years	Club	Games (Goals)
1897	Carlton	7 (0)
- ^{1} Playing statistics correct to the end of 1897.

James Francis Caffery (7 May 1872 – 8 June 1918) was an Australian rules footballer who played with Carlton in the Victorian Football League (VFL).
