= Walter Lyon (footballer) =

Australian rules footballer

Personal information
- Full name: Walter William Lyon
- Born: 1 October 1879; Lyons, Victoria
- Died: 3 January 1964 (aged 84); Perth, Western Australia
- Original team: Scotch College

Playing career^{1}
Years	Club	Games (Goals)
1897	Melbourne	1 (0)
- ^{1} Playing statistics correct to the end of 1897.

Walter William Lyon (1 October 1879 – 3 January 1964) was an Australian rules footballer who played with Melbourne in the Victorian Football League (VFL).
