= Frank O'Hara (footballer) =

Australian rules footballer

Personal information
- Full name: Francis O'Hara
- Born: 11 August 1872; South Melbourne, Victoria
- Died: 24 June 1944 (aged 71); Prince Henry's Hospital, Southbank, Victoria

Playing career^{1}
Years	Club	Games (Goals)
1897–1901	South Melbourne	60 (1)
- ^{1} Playing statistics correct to the end of 1901.

Francis O'Hara (11 August 1872 – 24 June 1944) was an Australian rules footballer who played with South Melbourne in the Victorian Football League (VFL).
