= Fred Whitelaw (footballer) =

Australian rules footballer (1878–1959)

Personal information
- Full name: Frederick Godfrey Whitelaw
- Born: 25 January 1878; Collingwood, Victoria
- Died: 30 March 1959 (aged 81); Chadstone, Victoria

Playing career^{1}
Years	Club	Games (Goals)
1897–99	St Kilda	30 (4)
- ^{1} Playing statistics correct to the end of 1899.

Frederick Godfrey Whitelaw (25 January 1878 – 30 March 1959) was an Australian rules footballer who played with St Kilda in the Victorian Football League (VFL).
