= Harry Purdy (footballer, born 1898) =

Australian rules footballer

Personal information
- Full name: Henry Frederick Burnett Purdy
- Born: 18 March 1898; South Melbourne, Victoria
- Died: 7 April 1978 (aged 80); Elwood, Victoria
- Height: 168 cm (5 ft 6 in)
- Weight: 62 kg (137 lb)

Playing career^{1}
Years	Club	Games (Goals)
1917, 1919	South Melbourne	9 (6)
- ^{1} Playing statistics correct to the end of 1919.

Henry Frederick Burnett Purdy (18 March 1898 – 7 April 1978) was an Australian rules footballer who played with South Melbourne in the Victorian Football League (VFL).

His father, also named Harry Purdy, was a renowned footballer for South Melbourne in the 1890s.
