= Ernie Stewart (Australian footballer) =

Australian rules footballer

Personal information
- Full name: Ernest Robert Stewart
- Born: 5 November 1874; St Kilda, Victoria
- Died: 25 March 1946 (aged 71); Frankston, Victoria

Playing career^{1}
Years	Club	Games (Goals)
1894–96	St Kilda (VFA)	29 (10)
1897	St Kilda	11 (0)
- ^{1} Playing statistics correct to the end of 1897.

Ernest Robert Stewart (5 November 1874 – 25 March 1946) was an Australian rules footballer who played with St Kilda in the Victorian Football Association (VFA) and Victorian Football League (VFL). He had a brother, Reg, who once topped St Kilda's goalkicking in the 1897 season.
