= Splatterpunk =

Movement within horror fiction

Splatterpunk is a movement within horror fiction originating in the 1980s, distinguished by its graphic, often gory, depiction of violence, countercultural alignment and "hyperintensive horror with no limits." The term was coined in 1986 by David J. Schow at the Twelfth World Fantasy Convention in Providence, Rhode Island. Splatterpunk is regarded as a revolt against the "traditional, meekly suggestive horror story". Splatterpunk has been defined as a "literary genre characterised by graphically described scenes of an extremely gory nature."

== History ==
Michael Shea's short story "The Autopsy" (1980) has been described as a "proto-splatterpunk" story.

Splatterpunk provoked considerable controversy among horror writers. Robert Bloch criticized the movement, arguing "there is a distinction to be made between that which inspires terror and that which inspires nausea". William F. Nolan and Charles L. Grant also censured the movement. However, critics R. S. Hadji and Philip Nutman praised the movement, the latter describing splatterpunk as a "survivalist" literature that "reflects the moral chaos of our times".

Though the term gained some prominence in the 1980s and 1990s, and, as a movement, attracted a cult following, the term "splatterpunk" has since been replaced by other synonymous terms for the genre. The last major commercial endeavor aimed at the splatterpunk audience was 1995's Splatterpunks II: Over the Edge, an anthology of short stories which also included essays on horror cinema and an interview with Anton LaVey. By 1998, one commentator suggested interest in splatterpunk was declining, saying it "seemed to have reached a peak" in the mid-1990s. The term is still sometimes used for horror with a strong gruesome element, such as Philip Nutman's novel Cities of Night.

In 2018, the organizers of KillerCon established the Splatterpunk Awards (or "Bernies") to honor achievement in the fields of splatterpunk and extreme horror. An author who won a Splatterpunk Medal for his novel, Full Brutal, was Kristopher Triana.

== Genre writers ==
Writers known for writing in this genre include Clive Barker, William Joseph Martin, Jack Ketchum, Richard Laymon, J. F. Gonzalez, Joe Lansdale, Brian Keene, Richard Christian Matheson, Robert R. McCammon, Shane McKenzie, Wrath James White, David J. Schow (described as "the father of splatterpunk" by Richard Christian Matheson), John Skipp, Craig Spector, Edward Lee, Ray Garton, Dan Shrader, and Michael Boatman. Some commentators also regard Kathe Koja as a splatterpunk writer.

== See also ==
- Splatter film
- Transgressive fiction
