= Charlie Forbes =

Australian rules footballer

Charles Forbes
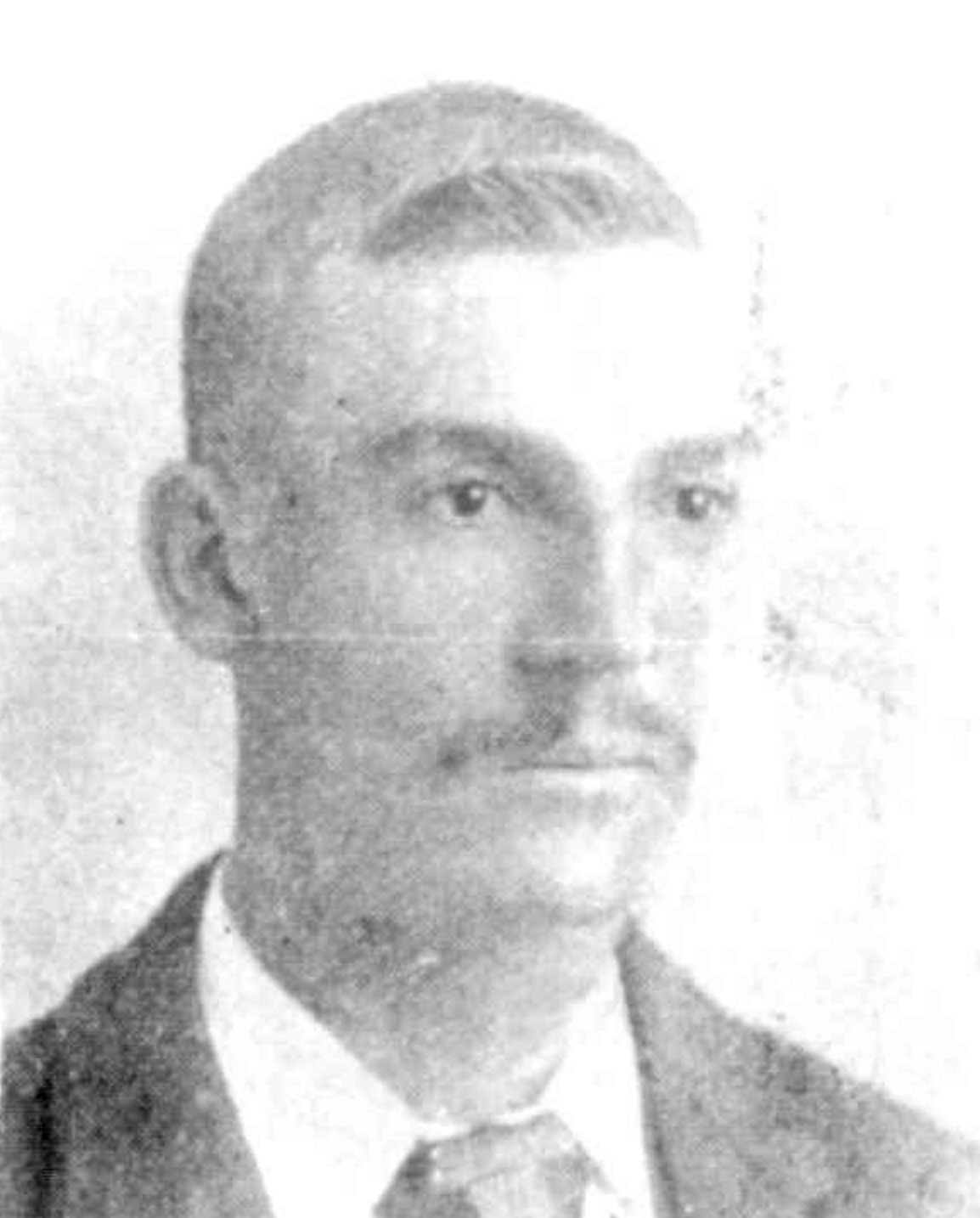
- Forbes in 1899

Personal information
- Full name: Charles Forbes
- Nickname: Tracker
- Born: 8 May 1865; West Melbourne, Victoria
- Died: 20 June 1922 (aged 57); West Melbourne, Victoria
- Original team: North Park Juniors
- Height: 191 cm (6 ft 3 in)
- Weight: 84 kg (185 lb)

Playing career^{1}
Years	Club	Games (Goals)
1889–1896	Essendon (VFA)	140 (39)
1897–1902	Essendon	52 (13)
Total		192 (52)
- ^{1} Playing statistics correct to the end of 1902.

Career highlights
- VFA premiership player 1891-94; VFL premiership player: 1897

Charlie "Tracker" Forbes (8 May 1865 – 20 June 1922) was an Australian rules footballer who played for the Essendon Football Club in the Victorian Football League (VFL).

== Family ==
The son of James Forbes (1815-1900), and Jessie Forbes (1830-1914), née Walker, Charles Forbes was born at West Melbourne, Victoria on 8 May 1865.

== Football ==
Forbes was a high marking ruckman — "being strong and wiry with a long reach he was able to take the ball well above the head of the average size footballer" — who, with his Essendon team-mates, ruckman Fred Ball and rover Colin Campbell, formed the dominant ruck combination of the era.

=== Essendon (VFA) ===
Recruited from the North Park "junior team" in West Melbourne, Forbes played 140 games between 1889 and 1896 for Essendon in the VFA, prior to the VFL's foundation.

A member of the Essendon teams that won four successive premierships from 1891 and 1894, Forbes was named Player of the Season in 1892 by The Argus.

=== Essendon (VFL) ===
In 1897, already 32, and playing as a "follower", he was one of the 20 who played for Essendon in its first VFL match against Geelong, at Corio Oval, on 8 May 1897: Jim Anderson, Edward "Son" Barry, Arthur Cleghorn, Tod Collins, Jim Darcy, Charlie Forbes, Johnny Graham, Joe Groves, George Hastings, Ted Kinnear, George Martin, Bob McCormick, Pat O'Loughlin, Gus Officer, Ned Officer, Bert Salkeld, George Stuckey, George Vautin, Norman Waugh, and Harry Wright.

He played in Essendon's VFL premiership team in 1897 (there was no "Grand Final" that year). He also played in the first-ever VFL "Grand Final" in 1898, which Essendon lost to Fitzroy.

== Death ==
Forbes died at his residence in West Melbourne, Victoria, following a protracted period of illness, on 20 June 1922.

== See also ==
- The Footballers' Alphabet
