= Jim Anderson (footballer) =

Australian rules footballer (1869–1947)

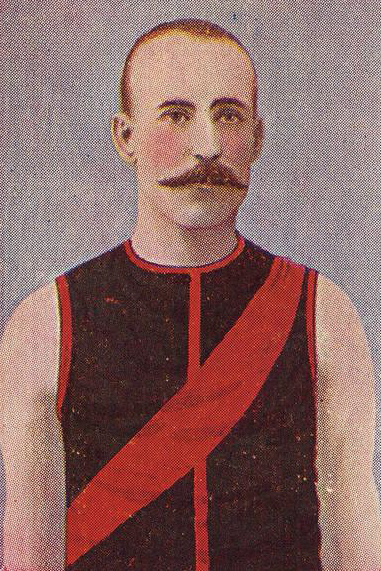
- Cigarette card of Anderson in 1905

Personal information
- Full name: James Anderson
- Born: 17 November 1869; Casterton, Victoria
- Died: 13 September 1947 (aged 77); Horsham, Victoria
- Original team: Scotch College

Playing career^{1}
Years	Club	Games (Goals)
1892–1896	Essendon (VFA)	65 (7)
1897–1905	Essendon (VFL)	136 (13)
Total		201 (20)
- ^{1} Playing statistics correct to the end of 1905.

Career highlights
- 3 × VFA premiership player: 1892-1894; 2 × VFL premiership player: 1897, 1901; Essendon captain: 1903–1904

Jim Anderson (17 November 1869 – 13 September 1947) was an Australian rules footballer who played for the Essendon Football Club in the Victorian Football League (VFL).

== Family ==
The son of John Stewart Anderson (1846-1918), and Rebecca Irene Anderson (1835-1915), née Oswald, née Tyrer, James Anderson was born at Sandford, near Casterton, Victoria on 17 November 1869.

He married Phoebe Faull Rodda (1871-1955) on 30 September 1896.

== Football ==
=== Essendon (VFA) ===
Recruited from Scotch College, Melbourne, then situated in East Melbourne, Anderson, a defender, played in three successive premiership teams in 1892-1894 during his time with Essendon in the VFA.

In his debut match, playing against North Melbourne in the first home-and-away match for the 1892 season, at the East Melbourne Cricket Ground, on 7 May 1892, it was noted that "Anderson, a Scotch College follower, played remarkably well", and that he was "a very promising follower" (especially significant given that the experienced follower, Fred Ball, in the second of his six seasons with Essendon, was unable to play in that match due to illness).

=== Essendon (VFL) ===
Playing at center half-back, he was one of the 20 who played for Essendon in its first VFL match against Geelong, at Corio Oval, on 8 May 1897: Jim Anderson, Edward "Son" Barry, Arthur Cleghorn, Tod Collins, Jim Darcy, Charlie Forbes, Johnny Graham, Joe Groves, George Hastings, Ted Kinnear, George Martin, Bob McCormick, Pat O'Loughlin, Gus Officer, Ned Officer, Bert Salkeld, George Stuckey, George Vautin, Norman Waugh, and Harry Wright.

He was also a member of VFL premiership team in 1897 (there was no Grand Final in 1897) and in the 1901 team that beat Collingwood in the Grand Final.

In 1903 and for part of 1904, he was club captain, and he twice represented Victoria at interstate football.

He played a total of 201 VFA and VFL games over 14 seasons, becoming the first Essendon player to play 200 games, with his games total being the club record until it was broken by Dick Reynolds in Round 8, 1945.

=== Horsham (WFA) ===
In 1906 he became the captain-coach of the Horsham Football Club in the Wimmera Football Association. He was still playing at the age of 43.

== Death ==
He died at Horsham, Victoria on 13 September 1947.

== See also ==
- The Footballers' Alphabet
