= Johnny Graham (Australian footballer) =

Australian rules footballer (1875–1946)

Personal information
- Full name: John Alexander Graham
- Born: 5 May 1875; Geelong
- Died: 16 August 1946 (aged 71); Boronia, Victoria

Playing career^{1}
Years	Club	Games (Goals)
1897	Essendon	1 (2)
- ^{1} Playing statistics correct to the end of 1897.

Johnny Graham (5 May 1875 – 16 August 1946) was an Australian rules footballer who played with Essendon in both the Victorian Football League (VFL).

== Family ==
The son of George Graham (1837-1897), and Sarah Graham (1833-1898), née McPhail, John Alexander Graham was born at Geelong on 5 May 1875.

He married Alice Eliza Lemmon at Carlton, Victoria on 22 February 1899. They were divorced in 1932.

He married Elsie Jane Morrow (1891-1962) in 1933.

== Football ==
=== Essendon (VFA) ===
He played for Essendon in the VFA in 1896.

=== Essendon (VFL) ===
Playing at full-forward in his only VFL senior match — in which he kicked two goals — he was one of the 20 who played for Essendon in its first VFL match against Geelong, at Corio Oval, on 8 May 1897: Jim Anderson, Edward "Son" Barry, Arthur Cleghorn, Tod Collins, Jim Darcy, Charlie Forbes, Johnny Graham, Joe Groves, George Hastings, Ted Kinnear, George Martin, Bob McCormick, Pat O'Loughlin, Gus Officer, Ned Officer, Bert Salkeld, George Stuckey, George Vautin, Norman Waugh, and Harry Wright.

== Death ==
He died at his residence in Boronia, Victoria on 16 August 1946.
