= Son Barry =

Australian rules footballer

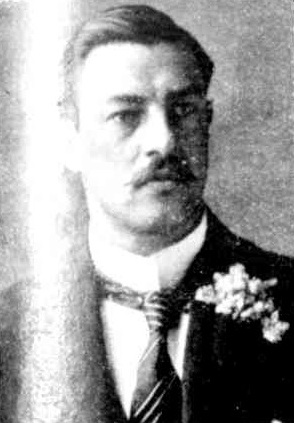
- Barry in 1901

Personal information
- Full name: Edward Barry
- Born: 8 March 1877; Melbourne, Victoria
- Died: 31 December 1959 (aged 82); Melbourne, Victoria
- Original team: Albert Park
- Position: Rover

Playing career^{1}
Years	Club	Games (Goals)
1896	Essendon (VFA)	16 (0)
1897–1905	Essendon	131 (24)
Total		147 (24)
- ^{1} Playing statistics correct to the end of 1905.

Career highlights
- 2× VFL premiership player: 1897, 1901

Edward "Son" Barry (8 March 1877 – 31 December 1959) was an Australian rules footballer who played for the Essendon Football Club in the Victorian Football League (VFL).

== Family ==
The son of John Barry (1843-1908), and Mary Ann Barry (1850-1897), née McLaughlin, Edward Barry was born on 8 March 1877.

He married Minnie Selina Young (1878-1945) in 1898.

== Cricket ==
Barry was a well-established cricketer; and, according to the sporting journalist, former Fitzroy footballer, former Essendon football coach, and former Australian Test cricketer, Jack Worrall, writing in 1936, a significant historical error needed to be corrected:

"The [recent] death of B.J.T. Bosanquet at the comparatively early age of 59 years has removed a great personality from the cricket world. Most people, and many scribes, are under the erroneous impression that [Bosanquet] was the discoverer of the class of ball known as the "googly" a name, I am led to believe, invented in New Zealand.
But while Bosanquet was not the founder of the "googly" he opened up a new era in the game by being the pioneer of that type of bowling in international games.
When [I was] a member of Darling's team in England in 1899 Bosanquet played for Oxford against us, and was fast medium, about the most prevalent type of bowling imaginable. He bowled really well, too, on that occasion, taking six for 83 in our first innings.
But many years before that period Son Barry, of East Melbourne, an Essendon footballer, bowled the googly, the first man to my knowledge that ever indulged in the art.
For smoothness and easiness of action, break, and non-detection Barry has never been approached, though with all his other gifts his length was atrocious. And for that reason he could not keep his place in East Melbourne's first eleven, playing mostly with the seconds.
Like many others of greater fame Barry's invention has passed to the credit of others, for he bowled the right as well as the "wrong 'un" at least 10 years before Bosanquet favoured its eccentricities." — J. Worrall, 24 October 1936.

A decade earlier, Worrall had drawn these same facts to his readers' attention when criticizing the claim made by Bosanquet, in his article, "The Googly", in the 1925 edition of Wisden, that he (Bosanquet) had bowled the first-ever googly in Australia to Victor Trumper, in a match against New South Wales, in 1903:

"If Bosanquet had said that he sent down the first googly in first-class cricket in Australia I would not have been able to contradict his statement on my own knowledge.
When I played against Oxford and Bosanquet in 1899 he was a fast, medium bowler, and at least 10 years before that time there played with East Melbourne a googly bowler named "Son" Barry, a famous Essendon footballer. Sometimes he played with the first eleven, but more often with the second. And so the honour of bowling the first googly in Australia is not Bosanquet's.
And though we have had many copyists we have never produced a more perfect bowler in style or break than Barry, who afterwards played with South Melbourne.
None have disguised the break so well, or could turn as much either way, yet for all his skill he could never master length, hence his comparative obscurity. The reason I mention the fact is that the distinction should be given to the right person."— J. Worrall, 29 May 1926.

== Football ==
Although his first name was Edward, Barry was known during his career by the nickname "Son".

=== Essendon (VFA) ===
He joined Essendon, from Albert Park, in 1896, after apparently trying out with South Melbourne in the pre-season, along with his Albert Park team-mate Mick Pleass, before he was offered "all sorts of inducements" to move to Essendon. He played his first game for Essendon, against Melbourne, at the MCG on 2 May 1896, the first of the season's home-and-away matches.

=== Essendon (VFL) ===
Playing as a "follower", Barry was one of the 20 who played for Essendon in its first VFL match against Geelong, at Corio Oval, on 8 May 1897: Jim Anderson, Son Barry, Arthur Cleghorn, Tod Collins, Jim Darcy, Charlie Forbes, Johnny Graham, Joe Groves, George Hastings, Ted Kinnear, George Martin, Bob McCormick, Pat O'Loughlin, Gus Officer, Ned Officer, Bert Salkeld, George Stuckey, George Vautin, Norman Waugh, and Harry Wright.

He was a rover in the Essendon team that won the 1897 VFL premiership (there was no "Grand Final" in 1897).

A regular Victorian interstate representative, Barry also played as a half forward and half back.

In 1901 he was a member of Essendon's second VFL premiership side.

== See also ==
- The Footballers' Alphabet
