= Arthur Cleghorn =

Australian rules footballer (1873–1951)

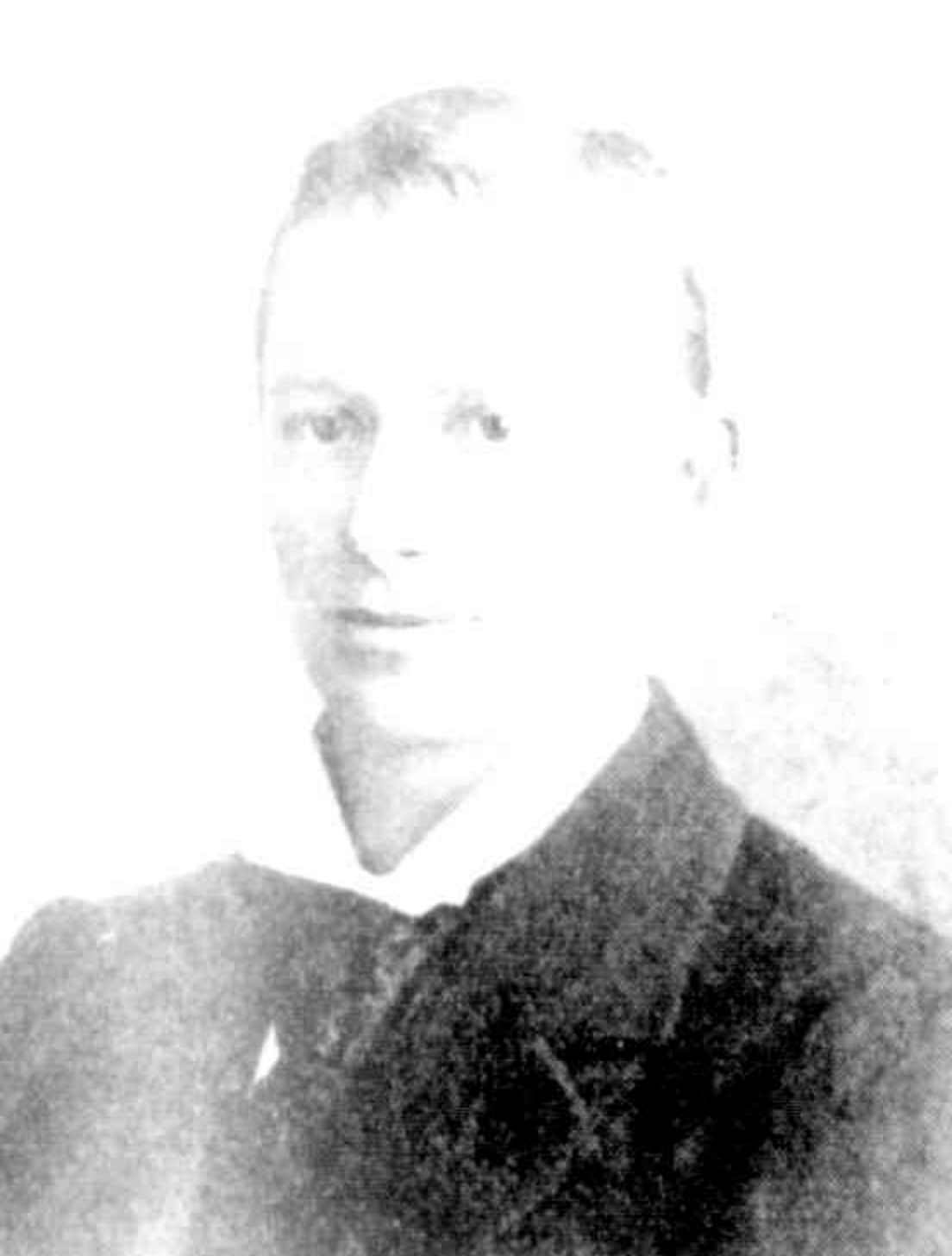
- Cleghorn in 1899

Personal information
- Full name: Arthur Cleghorn
- Born: 1 December 1873; Richmond, Victoria
- Died: 27 May 1951 (aged 77); The Alfred Hospital, Prahran, Victoria
- Original team: Richmond City

Playing career^{1}
Years	Club	Games (Goals)
1897–1903	Essendon	61 (53)
- ^{1} Playing statistics correct to the end of 1903.

Career highlights
- VFL premiership player: 1897; Essendon leading goalkicker: 1899

Arthur Cleghorn (1 December 1873 – 27 May 1951) was an Australian rules footballer who played for the Essendon Football Club in the Victorian Football League (VFL).

== Family ==
The son of the tailor and outfitter James Cleghorn (1826-1886), and Ann McPherson Cleghorn, née McGregor (1847-1928), Arthur Cleghorn was born at Richmond, Victoria on 1 December 1873.

== Football ==
=== Essendon (VFL) ===
Playing as a rover, and making his debut, he was one of the 20 who played for Essendon in its first VFL match against Geelong, at Corio Oval, on 8 May 1897: Jim Anderson, Edward "Son" Barry, Arthur Cleghorn, Tod Collins, Jim Darcy, Charlie Forbes, Johnny Graham, Joe Groves, George Hastings, Ted Kinnear, George Martin, Bob McCormick, Pat O'Loughlin, Gus Officer, Ned Officer, Bert Salkeld, George Stuckey, George Vautin, Norman Waugh, and Harry Wright.

In the first year of the VFL competition, 1897, he became one of the club's and the VFL's first premiership players.

He topped the club's goalkicking tally in 1899 and, on 26 August 1899 kicked 5 goals against St Kilda.

=== Richmond (VFA) ===
He was cleared from Essendon to Richmond in June 1904.

Playing on the half-forward flank, he was a member of Richmond's 1905 Victorian Football Association (VFA) premiership team.

== Death ==
He died on 27 May 1951, at the Alfred Hospital, Prahran, Victoria, three weeks after he was struck by a car, near his home in Moorabbin, on 5 May 1951.
