= Tod Collins =

Australian rules footballer and coach (1876–1942)

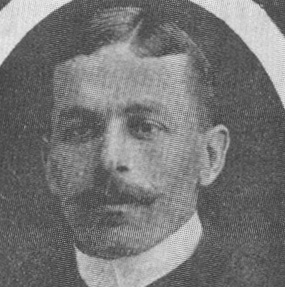

Personal information
- Full name: George Robert Collins
- Born: 30 January 1876; Hobart, Tasmania
- Died: 24 August 1942 (aged 66); Malvern, Victoria
- Original team: Austral / Ballarat
- Position: Defender

Playing career^{1}
Years	Club	Games (Goals)
1896	Essendon (VFA)	7 (4)
1897–1903	Essendon	91 (23)
Total		98 (27)
- ^{1} Playing statistics correct to the end of 1903.

Career highlights
- 2× VFL premiership player: 1897, 1901; Essendon captain 1901–1902

George Robert "Tod" Collins (30 January 1876 – 24 August 1942) was an Australian rules footballer who played for the Essendon Football Club in the Victorian Football League (VFL).

== Family ==
The son of George Washington Collins (1852-1916), and Mary Collins (1851-1941), née McConnell, George Robert Collins was born at Hobart, Tasmania on 30 January 1876: although his given name was George, he was always known as "Tod Collins".

He married Ada Catherine McKinnell (1875-1961) on 24 April 1912 in Hawthorn, Victoria.

== Football ==
=== Essendon (VFA) ===
Collins played mostly as a half back flanker and was a strong marker of the ball.

=== Essendon (VFL) ===
Playing on the half-forward flank, he was one of the 20 who played for Essendon in its first VFL match against Geelong, at Corio Oval, on 8 May 1897: Jim Anderson, Edward "Son" Barry, Arthur Cleghorn, Tod Collins, Jim Darcy, Charlie Forbes, Johnny Graham, Joe Groves, George Hastings, Ted Kinnear, George Martin, Bob McCormick, Pat O'Loughlin, Gus Officer, Ned Officer, Bert Salkeld, George Stuckey, George Vautin, Norman Waugh, and Harry Wright.

Collins was a member of the inaugural VFL premiership side with Essendon in 1897. During his career he was chosen to represent the Victoria interstate team, appearing in games against South Australia in 1900, 1901 and 1902.

He captained Essendon in 1901 and 1902, the former a premiership team.

=== Preston (VFA) ===
In 1906 he became captain-coach of Victorian Football Association club Preston, but retired five games into the season.

== Death ==
He died at Malvern, Victoria on 24 August 1942.
