= Jim Darcy =

Australian rules footballer (1875–1932)

Personal information
- Full name: Jim Darcy
- Born: 29 January 1875
- Died: 3 October 1932 (aged 57)
- Original team: West Melbourne Juniors

Playing career^{1}
Years	Club	Games (Goals)
1897	Essendon	9 (1)
- ^{1} Playing statistics correct to the end of 1897.

James Darcy (29 January 1875 – 3 October 1932) was an Australian rules footballer who played with Essendon in the Victorian Football League (VFL).

== Family ==
James Darcy was born on 29 January 1875.

== Football ==
Recruited from West Melbourne Juniors, and playing on the half-back flank, he was one of the 20 who played for Essendon in its first VFL match against Geelong, at Corio Oval, on 8 May 1897: Jim Anderson, Edward "Son" Barry, Arthur Cleghorn, Tod Collins, Jim Darcy, Charlie Forbes, Johnny Graham, Joe Groves, George Hastings, Ted Kinnear, George Martin, Bob McCormick, Pat O'Loughlin, Gus Officer, Ned Officer, Bert Salkeld, George Stuckey, George Vautin, Norman Waugh, and Harry Wright.

== Death ==
He died on 3 October 1932.
