= MacCormick =

MacCormick is a surname. Notable people with the surname include:

- Arthur MacCormick (1864–1948), Australian banker and cricketer
- Austin MacCormick (1893–1979), American criminologist and prison reformer
- Bill MacCormick (born 1951), English bassist and vocalist
- Cara Duff-MacCormick, Canadian actress best known for her work in American theatre
- Charles MacCormick (1862–1945), New Zealand lawyer, judge and cricketer
- Donald MacCormick (1939–2009), Scottish broadcast journalist
- Evan MacCormick (1882–1918), New Zealand cricketer and barrister
- Iain MacCormick (1939–2014), Scottish National Party (SNP) politician
- John MacCormick (1904–1961), lawyer and advocate of Home Rule in Scotland
- Neil MacCormick (1941–2009), legal philosopher and Scottish politician
- Niall MacCormick, television director for the BBC

== See also ==
- MacCormick v Lord Advocate (1953 SC 396), Scottish legal action in which John MacCormick (Rector of the University of Glasgow) and Ian Hamilton (then part of the Glasgow University Scottish Nationalist Association) contested the right of Queen Elizabeth II to style herself ‘Elizabeth II’ within Scotland
- MacCormick Fjord
- McCormick (surname)
- McCormack
