= Cormick =

Cormick may refer to:

- Coal Valley, Alabama, United States, also known as Cormick

== People with the surname ==
- Cormick (surname)

== See also ==
- Cormack (disambiguation)
- Cornick, a surname
- McCormick (disambiguation)
- McCormack, a surname
