= Robert McCormick =

Robert McCormick may refer to:

- Robert R. McCormick (1880–1955), American publisher of the Chicago Tribune
- Robert McCormick (explorer) (1800–1890), naturalist with the British Royal Navy
- Robert McCormick (Virginia inventor) (1780–1846), American inventor, and progenitor of the McCormick family of Chicago
- Robert McCormick, the ex-CEO of SAVVIS, Inc.
- Mack McCormick (Robert McCormick, 1930–2015), American musicologist and folklorist
- Robert Sanderson McCormick (1849–1919), American diplomat
- Robert J. McCormick (1949–2014), head of the Center for Child Advocacy and Policy program
- Robert John McCormick (1848–1919), Ontario farmer and political figure
- Bob McCormick (Scottish footballer) (1864–?), Scottish footballer
- Bob McCormick (Australian footballer) (1879–1957), Australian rules footballer

== See also ==
- Robert R. McCormick School of Engineering and Applied Science of Northwestern University
- Robert C. McCormack (born 1939), U.S. assistant secretary of the Navy (financial management), 1990–93
