= Cormack =

Cormack may refer to:

- Cormack, Newfoundland and Labrador, a community in Canada
- Cormack (surname), people with the surname Cormack

== See also ==
- McCormack
- Cormac
