= McCormick (surname) =

Origin
- Meaning: "son of Cormac"
- Region of origin: Ireland

Other names
- Variant forms: Cormack, MacCormack, McCormack, McCormick, MacCormick, Cormac, Cormach, Cormich, Cormiche, Cormack, Cormick

McCormick is a family name that originated in Ireland, Munster and later Scotland from the Irish given name. Spelling variations: Cormack, MacCormack, McCormack, McCormick, MacCormick, Carmack, Cormac, Cormach, Cormich and Cormiche. It comes from the first name of the original bearer. A person whose father was named Cormac would identify as Mc (i.e. "son of") Cormac; the combination was continued as the family name by subsequent generations.

Cormac is translated literally as "Charioteer, Warrior" in old Irish. The name was a very popular choice of names by parents in medieval times: this was due to the influences of the Saint of the same name. Saint Cormac Cormac mac Cuilennáin was the first Bishop of Cashel, an important diocese in the south of Ireland. Cashel was also the King of Munster and responsible for a famous book of Psalms, the Cashel Psalter, he died in battle in AD 908. See also earlier Irish saint Cormac of Armagh. In those days the McCormack was the name of a powerful Sept (Clan or Family) in the county of Longford, Cormac mac Airt, a semi-historical Irish high king who ruled from Tara ca. 227–266 AD. Cormac, son of Cabhsan, was the first chieftain to be called Cormack, and, of course, MacCormack came later as a direct descendant, Mac or Mc signifying the 'son of'.

In 1576, 1598 and 1600, MacCormicks are recorded as leading gentry in County Cork and one, of Muskerry, was influential enough to raise a large force to assist Desmond in the Elizabethan wars. The Annals of the Four Masters record the deaths of several prominent MacCormicks of County Fermanagh; the last of these died in 1431.

Another possible derivation of the name is that it comes from the Gaelic Mac Cormaic which comes from corb and mac meaning "Ravenson".

== Mac, Mc prefix ==
Scottish and Irish patronymic surnames frequently have the prefix Mac or Mc. When these surnames were originally developed, they were formed by adding the Gaelic word, mac, which means son of, to the name of the original bearer's father, or to the father's trade.

== Business ==
- Cyrus McCormick (1809–1884), US inventor and businessman
- Daniel McCormick (1739/40–1834), Irish-born US businessman and banker
- Harold Fowler McCormick (1872–1941), US businessman, son of Cyrus McCormick
- Joseph B. McCormick (born 1942), head of a branch at the Centers for Disease Control and Prevention
- L. Hamilton McCormick (1859–1934), US inventor and businessman, nephew of Cyrus McCormick
- Leander J. McCormick (1819–1900), US businessman and philanthropist
- Richard D. McCormick (born 1940), US businessman
- Robert Hall McCormick (1780–1846), US inventor, father of Cyrus McCormick
- Robert R. McCormick (1880–1955), US newspaper publisher
- William McCormick (born 1939), US businessman and government ambassador
- William Sanderson McCormick (1815–1865), US businessman, brother of Cyrus McCormick

== Education ==
- Bruce H. McCormick (1928–2007), US professor of computer science at Texas A&M University
- Charles T. McCormick (1889–1963), US professor of law and dean at The University of Texas, the University of North Carolina, and Northwestern University
- John Owen McCormick (1918–2010), American literary scholar
- John McCormick (born 1954), professor of political science at Indiana University Purdue University Indianapolis
- John P. McCormick (born 1966), American political scientist and Karl J. Weintraub Professor at the University of Chicago
- Marie McCormick (born 1946), the Sumner and Esther Feldberg Professor of Maternal and Child Health at Harvard T.H. Chan School of Public Health
- Richard L. McCormick (born 1947), US professor and university administrator at Rutgers University and the University of Washington
- Samuel McCormick (1858–1928), US professor and administrator of the University of Pittsburgh
- Robert J. McCormick (1948–2014), US professor of psychology, Italian, Spanish, and departmental chair of child advocacy at Montclair State University

== Entertainment ==
- Alyce McCormick (1899–1932), American actress and leader in the Volunteers of America
- Carolyn McCormick (born 1959), US film and television actress
- F. J. McCormick (1889–1947), Irish theater and film actor
- Gayle McCormick (1948–2016), American singer, member of the band Smith
- Haley McCormick (born 1985), American television and film actress
- Jill McCormick (born 1977), US fashion model
- Larry McCormick (1933–2004), US television personality
- Lisa McCormick (born c. 1971), US singer and songwriter
- Malcolm McCormick (1992–2018), birth name of Mac Miller, American rapper and singer
- Matt McCormick, US film producer and director
- Maureen McCormick (born 1956), US television and film actress
- Megan McCormick (born 1973), US television personality
- Myron McCormick (1908–1962), US stage, radio, film actor
- Pat McCormick (1927–2005), US film actor and screenwriter
- Pat McCormick (born c. 1933), US television personality
- Peter Dodds McCormick (1833–1916), Australian songwriter, composer of Australian anthem
- Robert "Mack" McCormick (1930–2015), US musicologist and folklorist
- Sierra McCormick (born 1997), US film actress

== Law ==
- Andrew Phelps McCormick (1832–1916), US federal judge
- John E. McCormick (1924–2010), longest serving Wisconsin circuit judge and Wisconsin State Assemblyman
- Mark McCormick (judge) (1933–2025), justice of the Iowa Supreme Court (1972–1986)

== Navy ==
- Daniel G. McCormick (1930–2011), Rear Admiral, retired as Inspector General of the United States Navy, 31 October 1981
- Lynde D. McCormick (1895–1956), Four-Star Admiral, Commander in Chief of the United States Atlantic Fleet, First supreme allied commander of all NATO forces in the Atlantic
- Robert McCormick (explorer) (1800–1890), British Royal Navy surgeon, explorer and naturalist

== Politics ==
- Adelbert J. McCormick (1845–1903), US member of the New York State Assembly
- C. L. McCormick (1919–1987), Illinois politician and businessman
- Dale McCormick (born 1947), Maine State Treasurer
- Dave McCormick (born 1965), US senator from Pennsylvania
- George M. McCormick (1841–1913), Illinois state senator
- Gerald McCormick (1962–2025), US member of the Tennessee House of Representatives
- Geraldine McCormick (1924–2005), American politician
- Henry C. McCormick (1839–1902), US Representative from Pennsylvania
- Hope Baldwin McCormick (1919–1993), US member of the Minnesota House of Representatives
- James Robinson McCormick (1824–1897), US Representative from Missouri
- John Patrick McCormick (born 1950), political journalist (Chicago Tribune, Newsweek)
- Joseph Medill McCormick (1877–1925), US Representative and Senator from Illinois
- Larry McCormick (1940–2011), Canadian Member of Parliament
- Norma McCormick (born 1944), Canadian Member of the Legislative Assembly
- Richard Cunningham McCormick (1832–1901), Governor of Arizona Territory and US Representative from New York
- Richard Dean McCormick (born 1968), US Representative from Georgia
- Robert Sanderson McCormick (1849–1919), US diplomat
- Ruth Hanna McCormick (1880–1944), US Representative from Illinois
- Terri McCormick (born 1956), US member of the Wisconsin Assembly

== Sports ==
- Andrew McCormick (rugby union) (born 1967), New Zealand-born Japanese rugby player
- Bob McCormick (Scottish footballer) (born 1864), Scottish footballer
- Chas McCormick (born 1995), US baseball player
- Cody McCormick (born 1983), Canadian ice hockey player
- Daniel McCormick (born 1986), US Olympic judoka
- Debbie McCormick (born 1974), Canadian-born US curler
- Enda McCormick (born 1997/8), Irish Gaelic footballer
- Ernie McCormick (1906–1991), Australian cricketer
- Fergie McCormick (1939–2018), New Zealand rugby player
- Frank McCormick (1911–1982), US baseball player
- Guillermo Mc Cormick (1938–2005), Argentine rugby union player
- Hugh J. McCormick (1854–1911), Canadian speed skater, World Professional Speed Skating Champion 1890–92
- Jim McCormick (1856–1918), Scottish-born US baseball player
- Jim McCormick (1884–1959), US football player
- Judy McCormick, All-American Girls Professional Baseball League player
- Kelly McCormick (born 1960), US diver
- Luke McCormick (born 1983), English footballer
- Luke McCormick (born 1999), English footballer
- Mason McCormick (born 2000), American football player
- Max McCormick (born 1992), American ice hockey player
- Mike McCormick (1938–2020), US baseball player
- Moose McCormick (1881–1962), US baseball player
- Nick McCormick (born 1981), English long-distance runner
- Pat McCormick (1930–2023), US diver
- Ricky McCormick (born 1952), American water skier
- Sincere McCormick (born 2000), American football player
- Stan McCormick (1923–1999), English rugby player and coach
- Steve McCormick (footballer) (born 1969), Scottish footballer
- Tim McCormick (born 1962), US basketball player
- Tom McCormick (1930–2012), American football halfback for the Los Angeles Rams and San Francisco 49ers
- Tom McCormick (boxer) (1890–1916), welterweight boxer of the 1910s

== Fictional characters ==
- Dan McCormick, in the film Man-Made Monster
- Kenny McCormick, one of the main characters on South Park
  - Stuart McCormick, Kenny's father
  - Carol McCormick, Kenny's mother
  - Kevin McCormick, Kenny's older brother
  - Karen McCormick, Kenny's younger sister
- Helen and Bartley McCormick, in The Cripple of Inishmaan (play by Martin McDonagh)
- Mark McCormick, on the TV series Hardcastle and McCormick
- Anoha McCormick, in the anime Brain Powerd

== Other ==
- Arthur David McCormick (1860–1943), British artist
- Cami McCormick (born 1961), American news reporter for CBS
- Caroline McCormick, British British cultural sector leader and consultant
- Donald B. McCormick (born 1932), American biochemist
- Edith Rockefeller McCormick (1872–1932), US socialite and opera patron
- Eric Hall McCormick (1906–1995), New Zealand historian
- Katherine McCormick (1875–1967), US biologist, suffragette, philanthropist
- James McCormick (1910–1940), IRA member, perpetrator of the 1939 Coventry bombing
- John Wesley McCormick (1754–1837), early US settler in Indiana
- Malky McCormick (1943–2019), Scotland's best known cartoonist and caricaturist
- Moses McCormick (1981–2021), American YouTuber and language coach
- Nancy Fowler McCormick (1835–1923), US philanthropist. Widow of Cyrus McCormick
- Ricky McCormick (murder victim) (1958–1999), American man who died mysteriously

== See also ==
- MacCormick
- McCormack
- Cormac
- Carmack
- McCormick (disambiguation)
