= Carmack =

Carmack is a surname derived from the Irish given name "Cormac". Notable people with the surname include:

- Adrian Carmack (born 1969), game artist, cofounder of id Software
- Chris Carmack (born 1980), American actor
- Edward W. Carmack (1858–1908), American politician
- George Carmack (1860–1922), American discoverer of gold in the Klondike region
- Howard Carmack, Internet spammer
- John Carmack (born 1970), American game programmer, co-founder of id Software
- Justin Carmack (1981–2000), American child actor
- Kate Carmack (1862–1920), First Nation woman
- Kona Carmack (born 1976), American model
- Douglas Carmack (born 1970) American Entrepreneur

== See also ==
- Carmack Amendment to the Interstate Commerce Act regarding the liability of carriers under receipts and bills of lading
- Carmacks, Yukon
- Carmacks Group
- Carmacks Airport
- Carmack's Reverse, computer graphics technique
- Little Salmon/Carmacks First Nation
- Cormack (surname)
- McCormack
- McCormick (surname)
