= McCornick =

McCornick may refer to:

- McCornick, Utah, a ghost town
- McCornick Building, a historic place in Salt Lake City

== See also ==
- McCormick (surname)
- McCormick (disambiguation)
