= McCormick =

McCormick may refer to:

== Business ==
- McCormick & Company, an American food company specializing in spices and flavorings
- McCormick & Schmick's, an American restaurant chain specializing in seafood
- McCormick Distilling Company, an American distillery
- McCormick Harvesting Machine Company, a manufacturer of the first mechanical reaper
- McCormick Tractors, a manufacturer of tractors, headquartered in Fabbrico, Italy

== Education ==
- McCormick Observatory, at the University of Virginia, in Albemarle County, Virginia
- McCormick School of Engineering, at Northwestern University, in Evanston, Illinois
- McCormick Theological Seminary, a Presbyterian school of theology in Chicago, Illinois

== Places in the United States ==
- McCormick, Illinois
- McCormick, South Carolina
- McCormick, Washington
- McCormick Gap, a windgap in Virginia

== People ==
- McCormick (surname)

== Sports ==
- McCormick Place, an exposition complex in Chicago, Illinois
- HomeTrust Park, a Minor League Baseball park in Asheville, North Carolina formerly named McCormick Field

== Other uses ==
- McCormick Dam, a hydroelectric generating station in Baie-Comeau, Quebec
- McCormick Ranch, a planned community in Arizona
- USS McCormick (DD-223), a Clemson-class destroyer in the US Navy during World War II
- USS Lynde McCormick (DDG-8), a Charles F. Adams class guided missile destroyer launched in 1959
- Hardcastle and McCormick, a 1980s television series
- Andrew Mellon Building, a former apartment house in Washington, DC, originally known as the McCormick

== See also ==
- McCormack
- Cormick (disambiguation)
