= Cormick (surname) =

Cormick is a surname, and may refer to:

- Craig Cormick (born 1961), Australian science communicator and author
- Georgia Cormick (born 1995), Australian rugby union footballer
- Johnny Cormick (1880–1957), Australian rules footballer
- Michael Cormick, Australian singer and actor
- William Cormick (1822–1877), physician of Irish origin in Qajar Iran

== See also ==
- Cormack (surname)
