= CBS News Radio =

Radio service of CBS News (1927–2026)

- Final logo, used from 2021 to 2026
- Type: News radio network
- Country: United States

Ownership
- Owner: Paramount Skydance Corporation
- Parent: CBS News (producer)

History
- Launch date: September 18, 1927
- Closed: May 22, 2026; (98 years, 246 days)

CBS News Radio, previously known as CBS Radio News and historically known as the CBS Radio Network, was a radio network that at its peak provided news to more than 1,000 radio stations throughout the United States. The network was owned by Paramount Skydance Corporation and its predecessors. On March 20, 2026, CBS News announced that service to approximately 700 remaining affiliate stations would end on May 22, 2026, with all staff positions being eliminated. It was the last of the three original national U.S. radio networks (CBS, NBC Radio Network and Mutual Broadcasting System) still operating and still owned by its original parent company, even though CBS sold its owned and operated radio stations in 2017 to Entercom (now known as Audacy, Inc.) (Note: The current NBC Radio Network is owned by iHeartMedia, and licenses use of the NBC name and audio from NBC News.)

== Background ==
Previous CBS News Radio logo

The network was the second-oldest unit of Paramount Skydance Corporation after Paramount Pictures. CBS Radio traces its roots to CBS's predecessor, United Independent Broadcasters, founded in 1927 with 47 network affiliates. Before United Independent Broadcasters went to air, Columbia Records invested in the radio network, which was renamed the Columbia Phonographic Broadcasting System. Eventually, the record company pulled its backing from the struggling web. William S. Paley bought a half-interest in what became the Columbia Broadcasting System in 1928 and became its president. (In 1938, CBS bought its former parent, Columbia Records.)

In its early years, the news service on the CBS network consisted only of United Press bulletins being read out on the air. The network's first regular news program, a five-minute segment on the morning show Something for Everyone, was introduced in 1929. In December 1930, CBS chief Paley hired journalist Paul W. White away from United Press as CBS's news editor. Paley put the radio network's news operation at the same level as entertainment, and authorized White to interrupt programming if events warranted. Along with other networks, CBS chafed at the breaking news embargo imposed upon radio by the wire services, which prevented them from using bulletins until they first appeared in print. CBS disregarded an embargo when it broke the story of the Lindbergh kidnapping in 1932, using live on-the-air reporting. Radio networks scooped print outlets with news of the 1932 presidential election.

On February 2, 2017, CBS Corporation announced that its shareholders had acquired a majority stake in Entercom (now Audacy, Inc.), whose corporate management would continue to oversee the company along with CBS's radio assets. The merger was approved on November 9, 2017, and was consummated on November 17. The CBS News Radio network service continued to be managed by CBS News. The shareholders sold their controlling stake in Audacy to Soros Fund Management in 2024.

On August 2, 2017, CBS announced that it had signed a contract with Skyview Networks for distribution of CBS News Radio. This went into effect January 1, 2018. On October 22, 2025, Audacy-owned Infinity Networks announced that it would take over distribution of CBS News Radio.

== Programming ==
=== Stations and affiliates ===
Until May 22, 2026, CBS News Radio was best known for its news and public affairs programming distributed to more than 500 affiliates, including former flagship station WCBS in New York (which ended their all-news format in August 2024 and is now known as WHSQ), and current flagship WINS and WINS-FM and several other all-news and news-talk stations. Prior to the closure announcement, affiliates included KNX in Los Angeles, WBBM in Chicago, KCBS in San Francisco, KRLD in Dallas, KYW in Philadelphia, KDKA in Pittsburgh, WTOP-FM in Washington, WBZ in Boston, WWJ in Detroit, WCCO in Minneapolis, KXNT in Las Vegas, KMOX in St. Louis, KFNX in Phoenix, KVOI in Tucson, and WTIC in Hartford. Several of these stations switched to other networks in the weeks leading up to the network's 2026 closure.

CBS News Radio offered hourly News-on-the-Hour newscasts (available in three- and six-minute versions) and a one-minute newscast at 31 minutes past the hour. They are sent to member stations 24 hours a day, 7 days a week. In addition to the over-the-air product, reports and actualities were made available to affiliates via the network's Newsfeed service. Many of the aforementioned outlets made heavy use of the CBS network feed material throughout their broadcast day.

The network was home to the morning edition of the CBS World News Roundup, U.S. broadcasting's oldest news series. The Roundup dates back to a special network broadcast on March 13, 1938, featuring live reports from Europe on Germany's annexation of Austria. Steve Kathan anchored the morning show, which aired at 8 am ET and 7 am PT, from 2010 to 2026.

=== News reporters and anchors ===
CBS News Radio had an impressive list of reporters around the world including Jim Krasula, Peter King, Linda Kenyon, Cami McCormick, Vicki Barker, Elaine Cobbe, Sabina Castelfranco and Robert Berger.

Mark Knoller was the network's long-time White House correspondent. Knoller made occasional appearances on CBS Television News, especially if he was the day's pool reporter for the White House press corps. Knoller no longer filed radio reports after about 2011, transitioning to report mostly on twitter. He left CBS in 2020.

=== Features and news programs ===
In 2009, CBS launched a long-form late night talk program hosted by Jon Grayson, based at KMOX in St. Louis, and a morning talk show hosted by Michael Smerconish, based at WPHT in Philadelphia, on some of its owned-and-operated stations. CBS handled the syndication of Grayson's show itself, while syndication for Smerconish's show to non-CBS stations had been outsourced to Dial Global (which at that time was not involved with the CBS Radio Network itself). Grayson's show, Overnight America, also entered national syndication via Dial Global on January 30, 2012. Smerconish discontinued the morning show in 2011 and Grayson's show was dropped by Westwood One at the end of 2016.

Three of CBS's television programs were simulcast over CBS News Radio affiliates; those are Face the Nation, 60 Minutes, and the CBS Evening News. Some stations, including WCBS in New York and WBZ in Boston, aired the entire Evening News. In addition, the Late Show with David Letterman Top Ten List was also broadcast by the network in a short-form-feature format until the show's conclusion with David Letterman's retirement in 2015.

Other public-affairs features included CBS Healthwatch with Dr. Emily Senay, Raising Our Kids (formerly suffixed with in the 90s during that decade) with former WCBS morning anchor Pat Carroll, What's in the News, and "Eye on Washington", a daily look at goings on in the nation's capital.

During the overnight hours, the CBS News 24/7 streaming service carried a simulcast of CBS News Radio's top-of-the-hour reports.

In March 2021, CBS News Radio hired John Batchelor to host a nightly newsmagazine, Eye on the World. Batchelor had previously hosted an eponymous show that was syndicated through Westwood One and, before that, through ABC Radio Networks.

CBS News Radio offered several weekly one-hour programs to its affiliates for airing on Saturdays and Sundays. They include The CBS News Weekend Roundup with Allison Keyes, CBS Eye on Travel with Peter Greenberg, Jill on Money with Jill Schlesinger and The Takeout with Major Garrett.

=== Sports programs ===
Historically, the sports coverage now produced by Westwood One was branded as CBS Radio Sports and, like the news features, was associated with the CBS Radio Network. However, after CBS began managing the original Westwood One in the mid-1990s, the sports broadcasts came under the Westwood One banner, with both identities used in the late 1990s. It was a practice that would continue even after CBS stopped managing Westwood One in 2007.

CBS launched a 24/7 sports radio network, CBS Sports Radio, in fall 2012. It was distributed through Cumulus Media Networks, owned by Cumulus Media. (Cumulus Media Networks was merged into Westwood One in 2013, following Cumulus' acquisition of Westwood One.) CBS Sports Radio was included in the 2017 sale of CBS Radio to Entercom (now Audacy, Inc.); after a license to use the CBS name ended in April 2024, it was renamed Infinity Sports Network.

== Closure ==
External videos
- Last CBS News Radio bulletins, via YouTube

On March 20, 2026, CBS News announced its intention to close CBS News Radio on May 22, 2026, after almost a century in operation; CBS News president Tom Cibrowski and editor-in-chief Bari Weiss cited that "[shifts] in radio station programming strategies, coupled with challenging economic realities, has made it impossible to continue the service." At the time of the announcement, CBS News Radio provided content to approximately 700 stations.

During a story on the closure for CBS News Sunday Morning, former CBS News chief correspondent Dan Rather stated that CBS News Radio "for many, many years, was a part, and I would argue not a small part, of what held the country together", while World News Roundup anchor Steve Kathan described the network as having been an American institution. The final day of operation featured various on-air tributes during its programming and bulletins. Christopher Cruise anchored the final two CBS News Radio bulletins at 11:00 p.m. and 11:31 p.m. ET on May 22, 2026; the latter featured final farewells from CBS News Radio anchors such as Kathan, Allison Keyes, and Deborah Rodriguez, as well as archival audio of Edward R. Murrow's signature signoff of "good night, and good luck", before Cruise himself signed off as the final voice heard on the network.

Prior to the closedown, most of Audacy's legacy news/talk stations began transitioning to ABC News Radio the same day, joining existing Audacy-owned affiliates WINS in New York and KYW in Philadelphia. Two broadcasters announced plans to launch their own news bulletin services on May 23, 2026, with an intent to service former CBS News Radio affiliates: free ad-supported streaming television content provider Live Channel USA announced that it would soft launch Radio Network News (RNN) on May 23, while Red Apple Media—owner of New York conservative station WABC—announced the Worldwide News Network, which is led by former WINS anchor Lee Harris. Harris stated that WNN would mimic the format and scheduling of CBS News Radio's bulletins to maintain familiarity (aside from, at the request of affiliates, moving the bottom-of-hour news update to be right at 30 minutes past the hour rather than 31), while several former CBS News Radio anchors (including Cooper Lawrence, Matt Pieper, Bill Rehkopf, and Michael Wallace) were hired to serve as its initial airstaff.
