= Magick Macabre =

Magick Macabre is a stage show by Irish Magician, Joe Daly. It had its world premiere at the Olympia Theatre in 2008. Before its world premiere, it had a preview on The Late Late Show before a national audience. It has been endorsed by Wes Craven and Riverdance creator John McColgan..

"
