= Gardiner Brothers =

Professional American dancers and social media personalities

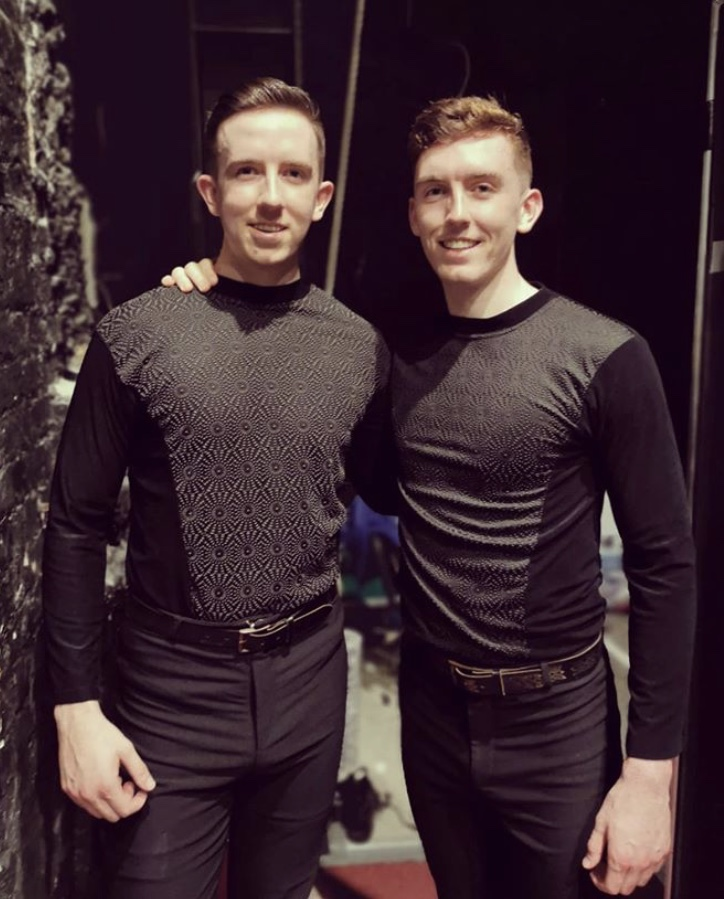
The Gardiner Brothers backstage before a Riverdance Performance in the Gaiety Theatre in Dublin.

The Gardiner Brothers are professional Irish dancers and social media personalities with over 10 million followers across their platforms. Michael (born 1995) and Matthew (born 1999) are Irish-American dancers and choreographers. They are both cast members of Riverdance and have toured the world extensively since auditioning for the show in 2015. They are known for their rhythm, innovation and syncopation and have both won the Irish dancing World Championship multiple times.

== Early lives ==
The brothers were born in Denver, Colorado to Irish parents, grew up in Galway, Ireland and are now based in Nashville, Tennessee. Their dad Eoin grew up in Dublin and their mother Marianne came from Sligo. Both parents wanted their kids to have some Irish culture while growing up in America. Michael and Matthew's older sister Anna began dancing at the age of 5 at the Wick School of Irish dance and the brothers soon followed. They fell in love with the Irish culture from an early age and it became extremely important to them. Their mother Marianne played in an Irish Folk band, 'The Chancers' during their years in Denver, and from a very young age, Anna, Michael and Matthew would perform with the band at gigs and concerts. Just after starting in their first dance class, their parents took them to see Riverdance which inspired their love of Irish dancing.

When the family moved to Galway, Ireland in 2006, they joined the Hession School of Irish Dance and developed their skills under the tutelage of Celine Hession, Gemma Carney, Deirdre Gallagher and Mary McDonnagh.

Both brothers attended university in Ireland. Michael qualified in architecture from the University of Limerick in 2019 and Matthew is qualified with first class honors in civil engineering from his studies at the National University of Galway, Ireland.

== Careers ==
=== Competitive career ===
Michael and Matthew have been dancing almost their entire lives. They started competing at the age of 5 at local competitions in Denver through An Coimisiún Le Rincí Gaelacha (CLRG). Between them, they have won over 40 major Irish dancing championship titles across the globe including 5 World Champion titles. These international solo titles they have won include: Oireachtas Rince na Cruinne (World Championships), All Ireland Championships, All Scotland Championships, Great Britain Championships, British National Championships, Irish National Championships, Connacht Championships and Western Regional Oireachtas. They competed in the solo events in each of these major competitions.

Their first major title was the Western Regional Oireachtas in the United States, which is a World Qualifying event. Michael (4) and Matthew (2) won 6 of these titles between them before moving to Ireland. While living in Ireland, they continued competing under the Hession School of Irish Dance in Galway. Along with their World Champion titles, between them they went on to win 6 Great Britain titles, 3 British National titles, 1 All Ireland title, 6 Irish National titles, 4 All Scotland titles and 16 Connacht titles. Their most impressive win was at the World Championships in Montreal in 2015, when both won their respective age groups in the same week. They were the first brothers to achieve this feat in nearly 40 years. Matthew won on April 1 (14-15 age group) with a perfect score of 700/700 and Michael won his second consecutive title (18-19 age group) 3 days later.

Michael retired from competition after his 2 consecutive World Championship wins in London (18-19 age group, 2014) and Montreal (19-20 age group, 2015). Matthew went on to win his final 2 World Championships in Dublin (17-18 age group, 2017) and Glasgow (18-19 age group, 2018).

=== Professional career ===
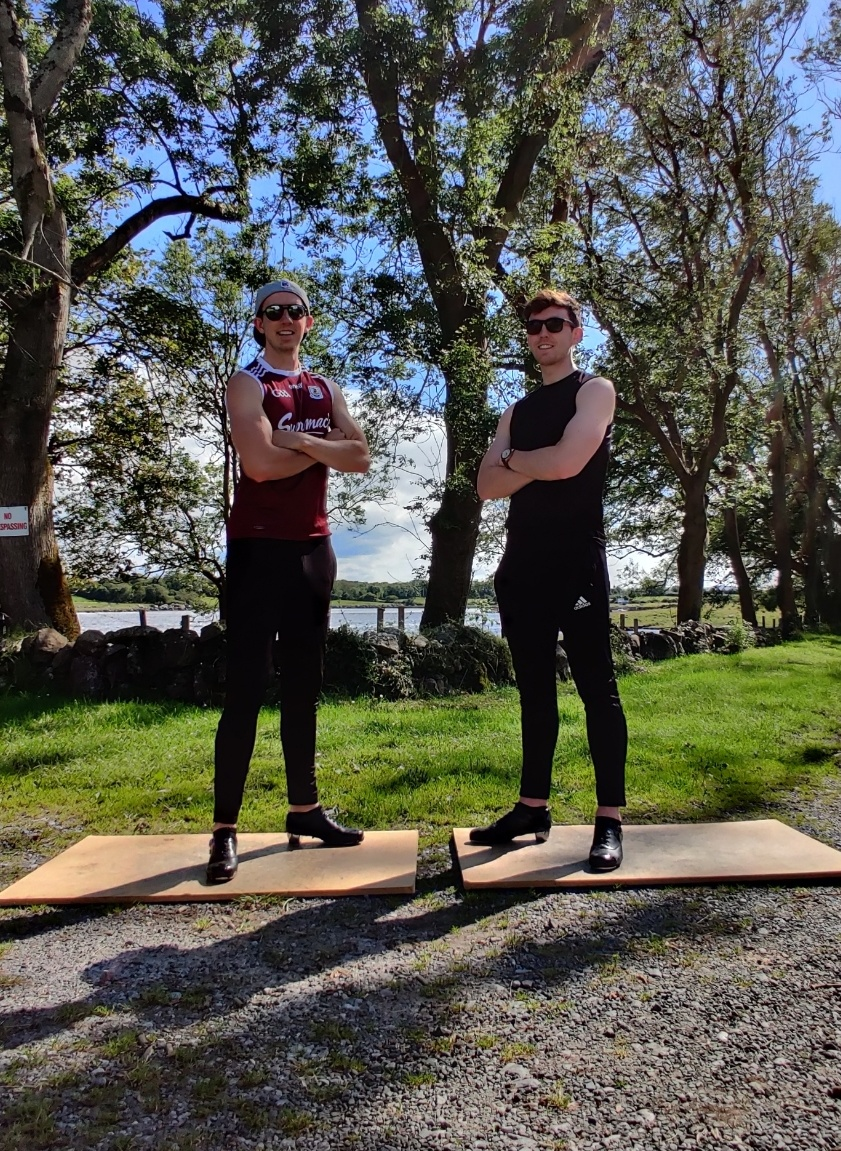
Michael and Matthew Gardiner dancing during lockdown in Ireland 2020.

In their professional careers, they have performed across the world as themselves 'The Gardiner Brothers' and as principal dancers in various touring companies including Riverdance, The Kilfenora Ceili Band, Fusion Fighters and Trad on the Prom. They have performed in collaboration with world renowned venues, artists and companies such as Andrea Bocelli, Pope Francis, The Grand Ole Opry, Youtube, Tiktok, General Mills and more. Michael and Matthew were both a part of Riverdance's 25th anniversary tour and feature in the Riverdance 25 movie. Michael featured as a member of the Riverdance cast that performed in Radio City Music Hall from March 10–14, 2020. He also appeared with the cast on NBCs Today Show. Matthew featured as a member of the Riverdance cast in the 3 Arena in Dublin from February 6–9, 2020.

The brothers have had numerous appearances on television. Their first big appearance was when they performed on The Late Late Toy Show in 2011. They have also appeared on This Morning, The Late Late Show, NBC Today Show, The Jennifer Hudson Show, Home and Family on the Hallmark Channel, RTE Today Show and RTE Nationwide.

Michael and Matthew have become known for their unique choreography. Up until 2020, they choreographed and taught for the Hession School of Irish Dance. Michael choreographed with the Trinity Irish Dance Company in Chicago in 2016 and 2018 and together they were a part of the choreography team on a piece performed for Pope Francis' visit to Ireland in 2018. They are both instructors at the Riverdance Summer School.

Matthew appeared in Ed Sheeran's Galway Girl music video which was filmed in O'Connors pub in Salthill, Galway.

=== Social media ===
The Gardiner Brothers first posted a video to social media in 2012 to Michael Jackson's 'Smooth Criminal' which amassed over 39,000 shares on Facebook. Since then, they have enjoyed posting dancing videos showcasing their talent and the Irish culture to their social media audience.

At the beginning of the COVID-19 pandemic, the brothers spent their time choreographing and creating videos to various artists, with the aim of showcasing how modern, athletic and versatile Irish dancing has become. They started actively posting content on the video sharing apps TikTok and Instagram in 2020. Due to their success on social media, they were approached by multiple media outlets for interviews and features including The LA Times, The Irish Times, This Morning, The Late Late Show, NBC Today Show, The Jennifer Hudson Show, Home and Family on the Hallmark Channel, RTE Today Show and RTE Nationwide, Spin South West and Virgin Media's Six O'clock show.

By 2026, they have accumulated over 10 million followers across their social media platforms and have collaborated as content creators and ambassadors with global brands including Lucky Charms, Visit Dubai, Hugo Boss, McDonald's, and Aer Lingus.

=== Speaking appearances ===
The Gardiner Brothers appeared as speakers at the 2026 Global Leadership Conference.
