= McCormac =

McCormac is a surname. Notable people with the surname include:

- Gerry McCormac (born 1958), Northern Irish physicist and academic administrator
- John McCormac (born 1958), American politician

== See also ==
- McCormack
