= Cormac =

Given name

- Gender: Masculine
- Language: English, Irish

Origin
- Language: Irish
- Origin: Gaelic
- Meaning: charioteer, raven

Other names
- Pet name: Mac
- Derivatives: Kormákr, Corbmac

Cormac is a masculine given name in the Irish and English languages. The name is ancient in the Irish language and is also seen in the rendered Old Norse as Kormákr.

Mac is Irish for "son", and can be used as either a prefix or a suffix. The derivation of "cor" is not so clear. The most popular speculation is that it is from "corb," the old Irish for wheel, perhaps designating someone who fought in a cart or chariot as male names are often derived from the order of battle. (For instance "Gary, Garth, etc., from "gar" for "spear.") However, some etymologies suggest it derives from the old Irish for "raven", a bird laden with mystical meaning for the Celts, and often used to mean "legend" or "legendary". Similarly, it might refer specifically to Corb, one of the legendary Fomorians of Irish mythology. Today the name is typically listed in baby names books as meaning "raven" or "legend" or sometimes as "charioteer".

== People with the name ==
- Cormac Antram (1926–2013), American priest
- Cormac of Armagh, medieval Irish archbishop
- Cormac Breslin (1902–1978), Irish politician
- Cormac J. Carney (born 1959), American judge
- Cormac Cond Longas, legendary Irish prince
- Cormac Costello (born 1994), Gaelic football player
- Cormac Cullinan, South African attorney
- Cormac Devlin (born 1980), Irish politician
- Cormac Izuchukwu (born 2000), Irish rugby union player
- Cormac Kennedy-Leverett (born 2000), Australian rower
- Cormac Kinney (born 1981), American entrepreneur
- Cormac mac Airt, legendary Irish king
- Cormac Mac Carthaigh, medieval Irish king
- Cormac Laidir MacCarthy (1411–1494), Irish royal
- Cormac mac Cuilennáin (died 908), Irish bishop and regional king of Munster
- Cormac McAnallen (1980–2004), Irish Gaelic footballer
- Cormac McCarthy (1933–2023), American novelist
- Cormac Murphy (born 1993), Irish hurler
- Cormac Murphy-O'Connor (1932–2017), British cardinal
- Cormac O'Brien (disambiguation), multiple people
- Cormac O'Doherty (born 1996), Irish Gaelic footballer
- Cormac O'Raifeartaigh, Irish physicist
- Cormac Roth, 16th century Irish archbishop
- Cormac Rowe (born 1983), Irish chef
- Cormac Ryan (born 1998), American basketball player
- Cormac Ua Liatháin, Irish saint

== Fictional characters ==
- Cormac McLaggen, fictional character from Harry Potter
- Cormac O'Sullivan, fictional character from River City

== See also ==
- List of Irish-language given names
- Cormack (surname)
- McCormack
