= Cromack =

Cromack is a surname of English origin. The surname was first recorded in Yorkshire, England.

People with the surname include:

- Bernard Cromack (born 1937), former English cricketer
- Sam Cromack (born 1989), lead vocalist and frontman of Australian indie rock band Ball Park Music
- Roy Cromack (1940–2017), English racing cyclist
- Vic Cromack (1920–1984), English professional footballer
