= Joanne Doyle =

Irish dancer

- Born: 1973 (age 52–53); Dublin, Ireland
- Occupation: Irish dancer
- Years active: 1995–2005
- Career
- Former groups: Dualta, Riverdance
- Dances: Irish stepdance

Joanne Doyle (born 1973) is a former professional Irish dancer who is most famous for her lead role in Riverdance. In her 10 years with Riverdance, Doyle became the longest-serving lead in the show's history and danced in over 2,500 performances.

== Early life ==
Born and raised in Lucan, Dublin, Doyle started dancing at the age of three and won several bronze, silver and gold medals at Irish and World Championships. After graduating from Mount Sackville Secondary School in nearby Chapelizod, Doyle began a Masters in European Social Policy where she was required to study at a different university for each semester. In early 1994, she moved to Ljubljana to study in Slovenia. It was at this time that Riverdance performed their seven-minute interval act at the Eurovision Song Contest. Being aware of the performance, she convinced a local pub to put it on the television. Her good friend, Breandán de Gallaí, was one of the troupe members that night and it was only because of her university commitments that Doyle herself did not audition for a role in the performance.

== Riverdance ==
=== Early years ===
After completing her studies, Doyle returned to Dublin with the goal of joining Riverdance for their first full-length show. Dancing alongside Breandán de Gallaí with their dance company Dualta, Doyle gained recognition from Riverdance lead Michael Flatley. She subsequently bypassed the rigorous auditions the other dancers were put through and joined the show's troupe for rehearsals just eight months after the Eurovision Song Contest interval act. She went on to dance in the show's opening night performance at the Point Theatre in Dublin on 9 February 1995.

In November 1995, Doyle was named a principal understudy to lead female dancer Jean Butler. Learning the trade from Butler, Doyle went on to do her first show as the lead in London on 29 January 1996. However, she tore a cartilage in her knee on 10 February and subsequently missed out on performing in the show's first overseas tour in March 1996 at Radio City Music Hall in New York City. Later that year, Riverdance divided into two companies which later grew into three. Doyle and Breandán de Gallaí paired up as lead dancers of the Liffey company which toured Europe and Asia.

=== Later years ===
In 2002, Doyle featured in the third Riverdance live recording instalment as she danced the lead alongside Breandán de Gallaí in Geneva, Switzerland. In June 2003, she performed at the Opening Ceremony of the Special Olympics at Croke Park, Dublin. In October 2003, Doyle and Conor Hayes were the leads when Riverdance toured China for the first time with multiple sell out performances in the Great Hall of the People in Beijing.

Doyle stopped performing full-time for Riverdance in late 2003 and moved to France with her partner. However, she continued on with the show for two more years as part of the Riverdance Flying Squad which did occasional shows. As lead for the Avoca company, she performed in France throughout 2005 before finally leaving the show for good at the end of the year.

== Personal life ==
In October 2005, Doyle got engaged to French restaurant owner Pierre Sansonetti. As of 2022, she was teaching Irish dance in various schools in the south of France.
