= Breandán de Gallaí =

Irish dancer (born 1969)

- Born: 10 June 1969 (age 57); Belfast, County Antrim
- Occupation: Irish dancer
- Years active: 1994–2003
- Dancing career
- Former groups: Dualta, Riverdance
- Dances: Irish stepdance

Breandán de Gallaí, a.k.a. Brendan de Gallaí or Brendan Galway (born 10 June 1969), is a professional Irish dancer and former lead in Riverdance.

== Dancing career ==
=== Early years ===
de Gallaí was born into a family of seven by his father Gerry of Belfast and his mother Nellie of County Donegal. In 1987, he moved to the United States and joined Gus Giordano’s dance academy in Chicago where he studied ballet, jazz, modern dance and tap dancing. In 1988, he moved back to Ireland and enrolled at Dublin City University and studied Applied Physics for four years. He was also an occasional substitute primary school teacher in physical education, Irish and mathematics.

=== Riverdance ===
In early 1994, de Gallaí received a call to audition for Riverdance's Eurovision Song Contest interval act. It was here that he met Michael Flatley, and after just two weeks of rehearsals, he was picked as one of just 24 dancers for the performance. Around that time, de Gallaí and long-time friend Joanne Doyle set up their own dance company called Dualta. He and Joanne both went on to be part of the Riverdance: The Show premiere in Dublin in February 1995, and both later starred for Riverdance as lead dancers for the Liffey Company. de Gallaí's tenure with Riverdance spanned 9½ years, with his final gig for the show coming in 2003 at the Opening Ceremony of the Special Olympics at Croke Park, Dublin. As the lead male dancer for seven of those years, he performed in Europe, Asia, Australia and New Zealand, and performed live for Presidents McAleese and Robinson of Ireland, Queen Elizabeth, and Prince Charles. He was also honoured to perform for and to meet King Hussein of Jordan, the Emperor of Japan, the Crown Prince of Japan, Princess Diana, Prince Rainier of Monaco, and Queen Sonia of Norway. de Gallaí continued on with Riverdance as a dance director and later helped out behind the scenes with the 2010 DVD, Riverdance: Live from Beijing.

=== Outside of Riverdance ===
As a choreographer, de Gallaí has created several works, most notably Noċtú and Rite of Spring. In 2011, Noċtú completed a five-week residency at the Irish Repertory Theatre in New York. On the back of this run, the show was nominated for two Drama Desk awards, "Outstanding Choreography" and "Unique Theatrical Event". His second work, Stravinsky's Rite of Spring, premiered at the opening of the Fleadh Fringe in August 2012, attracting 14,000 spectators. The work received a nomination for the coveted Allianz Business to Arts Awards (Dublin 2012).
