= Bernard Cromack =

English cricketer

Personal information
- Full name: Bernard Cromack
- Born: 5 June 1937; Rothwell, Yorkshire
- Batting: Right-handed
- Bowling: Left-arm orthodox spin
- Role: All-rounder

Domestic team information
- Years: Team
- 1959–68: Leicestershire
- First-class debut: 12 August 1959 Leicestershire v Ireland
- Last First-class: 24 June 1968 Leicestershire v Surrey

Career statistics
Competition	First-class
Matches	34
Runs scored	626
Batting average	11.81
100s/50s	0/2
Top score	55
Balls bowled	2272
Wickets	38
Bowling average	26.47
5 wickets in innings	1
10 wickets in match	0
Best bowling	6/48
Catches/stumpings	14/–
- Source: CricketArchive, 7 January 2014

Bernard Cromack (born 5 June 1937) is a former English cricketer who played first-class cricket for Leicestershire between 1959 and 1961, reappearing in a single match in 1968. He was a right-handed lower-order batsman and a left-arm orthodox spin bowler. He was born at Rothwell in Yorkshire.

== Cricket career ==
Cromack played second eleven cricket for Yorkshire in 1955 but was not able to break into the county's first team. He joined Leicestershire in 1959, following in the footsteps of Jack van Geloven, also in Yorkshire's 1955 second team, and made his first-class debut in two matches that season, bowling just four overs in the two games.

In 1960, in a very weak Leicestershire team, Cromack played in 20 first-team matches, often, in a brittle batting line-up, coming in as high as No 6, though he averaged less than 11 runs per innings for the season. With a bowling attack geared towards seam bowling with Terry Spencer and Brian Boshier, and an established spinner in John Savage, Cromack was bowled sparingly, and took only 28 wickets all season. The match against Middlesex at Lord's was his sixth first-class game, but to that point he had taken just two first-class wickets; he took six for 48 in Middlesex's first innings, the best bowling figures of his career. But then Leicestershire had to follow on and when they batted again they squandered a first-wicket partnership of 196 by losing all 10 wickets for a further 18 runs, giving the home team an easy victory. Two weeks later, he scored 55 against Hampshire, his highest score. There was a second half-century at the end of June with 53 in the game against Nottinghamshire. But Cromack's season subsided after that and he was left out of several matches in August.

He reappeared regularly in the first month of the 1961 season, but had neither batting nor bowling success, and was dropped by early June. He did not play first-class cricket again, apart from a solitary appearance in 1968 when Leicestershire were beset by injuries and Test calls, and he played in a rain-ruined match against Surrey, but did not bat or bowl.
