= Charles MacCormick =

New Zealand cricketer and judge (1862–1945)

Personal information
- Full name: Charles Edward MacCormick
- Born: 29 January 1862; Sydney, New South Wales, Australia
- Died: 30 July 1945 (aged 83); Auckland, New Zealand
- Relatives: Arthur MacCormick (brother); Evan MacCormick (brother)

Domestic team information
- Years: Team
- 1884/85–1893/94: Auckland
- Source: ESPNcricinfo, 16 June 2016

Charles Edward MacCormick (29 January 1862 – 30 July 1945) was an Australian-born lawyer, judge and cricketer. He played five first-class matches in New Zealand for Auckland between the 1884–85 and 1893–94 seasons.

Charles MacCormick was born at Balmain in Sydney, Australia in 1862, one of 11 children. He was the son of Charles MacCormick, a barrister who worked at the Supreme Court of New South Wales. The family moved to Auckland in New Zealand in 1865 and MacCormick was educated at Auckland Grammar School and Auckland University College.

MacCormick trained as a lawyer and was clerk to Thomas DuFaur before becoming a partner in the firm in around 1900. The firm specialised in Māori land law, and in 1906 MacCormick was appointed as one of the judges of the Native Land Court. In 1940 he became the court's Chief Justice. He served as the President of the New Zealand Amateur Athletic Association and was involved in running cricket and rugby union clubs in Auckland.

MacCormick died at Auckland in 1945. He was aged 83.
