= Howard Carmack =

Howard Carmack, also known as the Buffalo Spammer, was the first sender of spam in the United States to be imprisoned. He was arrested in New York in May 2003, and sentenced in March 2004 to between 3.5 and 7 years in prison.

Carmack sent out 825 million e-mails, fraudulently using the identities of two people from the city of Buffalo, as well as hundreds of aliases.

Before this conviction, Carmack also lost a lawsuit before a federal court in Atlanta, which required him to pay damages of US$14.5 million to Earthlink, his former internet service provider, for the same actions.

== See also ==
- List of spammers
