= Paul Cormack =

English cricketer (born 1962)

Personal information
- Full name: Paul Gregory Cormack
- Born: 15 April 1962 (age 64); Blyth, Northumberland, England
- Batting: Right-handed
- Bowling: Off Spin

Domestic team information
- Years: Team
- 1985–1993: Northumberland

Career statistics
Competition	List A
Matches	3
Runs scored	53
Batting average	17.66
100s/50s	–/–
Top score	36
Balls bowled	–
Wickets	–
Bowling average	–
5 wickets in innings	–
10 wickets in match	–
Best bowling	–
Catches/stumpings	–/–
- Source: Cricinfo, 1 July 2011

Paul Gregory Cormack (born 15 April 1962) is a former English cricketer. Cormack was a right-handed batsman who occasionally bowled off spin. He was born in Blyth, Northumberland.

Cormack made his debut for Northumberland in the 1985 MCCA Knockout Trophy against Lincolnshire. Cormack played Minor counties cricket for Northumberland from 1985 to 1993, which included 31 Minor Counties Championship appearances and 7 MCCA Knockout Trophy matches. He made his List A debut against Essex in the 1986 NatWest Trophy. He made 2 further List A appearances, against Essex in the 1987 NatWest Trophy and Surrey in the 1989 NatWest Trophy. In his 3 List A matches, he scored 53 runs at an average of 17.66, with a high score of 36.
