= Cormac O'Brien =

Cormac O'Brien may refer to:

- Cormac O'Brien (author)
- Cormac O'Brien (hurler)
