= Cormac Rowe =

Irish chef

- Born: abt. 1983; Bridgetown, County Wexford
- Occupation: Head chef
- Known for: Michelin starred Lady Helen Restaurant

Cormac Rowe (Bridgetown, County Wexford, born abt. 1983 ) is an Irish Michelin star winning head chef with Lady Helen in Thomastown, County Kilkenny Ireland

Rowe started his kitchen career in Kelly's Hotel in Rosslare. Later he went to college followed by a stint at The Park Hotel. Since 2006, Rowe works at the Lady Helen Restaurant in the Mount Juliet Hotel. He is the head chef since 2010.

== Awards ==
- Michelin star: 2014

== Personal ==
Cormarc Rowe is the son of Peter and Bernie Rowe.
