= Cormac Roth =

Cormac Roth (or Roche) was Archdeacon of Armagh from 1535 until 1548. He was also Rector of Heynestown, Vicar of Termonfeckin and Prebendary of Kene in Armagh cathedral.
