= Arthur MacCormick =

New Zealand cricketer

Personal information
- Full name: Arthur Deloitte MacCormick
- Born: 1864; Balmain, Sydney, New South Wales, Australia
- Died: 14 January 1948 (aged 83–84); Sydney, New South Wales, Australia
- Role: Bowler
- Relatives: Charles MacCormick (brother); Evan MacCormick (brother)

Domestic team information
- Years: Team
- 1888/89: Otago
- Source: ESPNcricinfo, 15 May 2016

Arthur Deloitte MacCormick (1864 – 14 January 1948) was an Australian cricketer. He played one first-class match in New Zealand for Otago in the 1888–89 season.

MacCormick was born at Balmain in Sydney, Australia in 1864. He was one of 11 children. His father, John MacCormick, was a barrister who worked in Auckland, (Note: John Charles MacCormick was born in the Spanish West Indies and educated in England before going to Australia. He worked in the Supreme Court of New South Wales and was admitted to the bar there before moving in Auckland in 1865 where he was a leading barrister. He died in 1904.) but both Arthur and his older brother Charles were born in Australia. The family moved to Auckland in 1865. and Arthur was educated at Auckland Grammar School and Auckland University College.

MacCormick worked for the Colonial Bank of New Zealand, initially in Auckland before transferring to Dunedin in March 1888. He had played club cricket for Auckland United and was described at the time as "the well-known Auckland cricketer". He had been considered for selection for an Auckland team against a touring Australian team in 1886, but was unable to get leave to play. The New Zealand Herald described him as a change bowler who "bowls pretty well" and who "is a fair batsman" despite being "very nervous" at the crease.

His only first-class match was a January 1889 fixture between Otago and Canterbury played at Lancaster Park in Christchurch. He took two wickets in the match as Otago lost by an innings.

Having returned to Sydney by the time of his mother's death in 1926, MacCormick died in the city in 1948.
