= Johnny Cormick =

Australian rules footballer

Personal information
- Full name: John Dobson Cormick
- Born: 22 January 1880; Port Melbourne, Victoria
- Died: 2 August 1957 (aged 77); Cheltenham, Victoria
- Original team: Blenheim / West Melbourne

Playing career^{1}
Years	Club	Games (Goals)
1902–03	South Melbourne	5 (3)
- ^{1} Playing statistics correct to the end of 1903.

John Dobson Cormick (22 January 1880 – 2 August 1957) was an Australian rules footballer who played with South Melbourne from 1902 to 1903 in the Victorian Football League (VFL). Cormick played in 5 games, scoring 3 goals.
