= Riverdance =

Irish musical and dance production

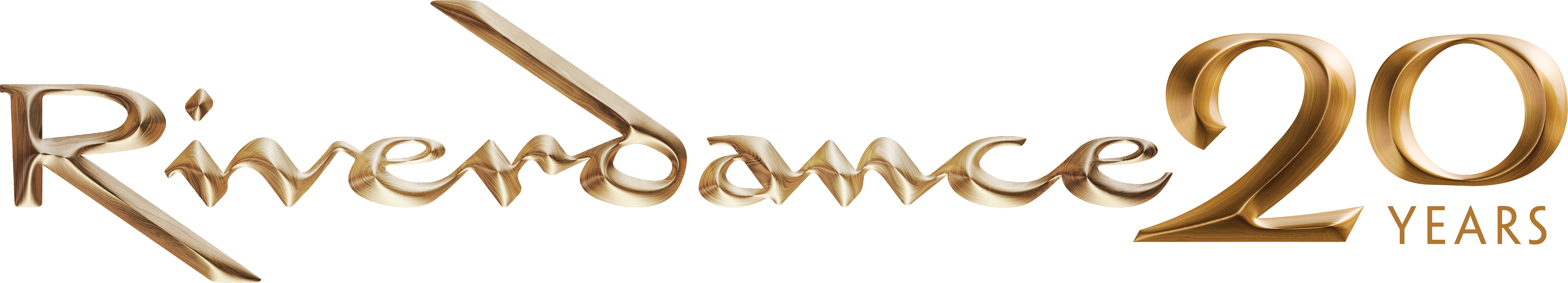
- 20th Anniversary logo
- Genre: Irish folk music, Irish dance
- Show type: Touring theatrical show
- Date of premiere: 9 February 1995
- Location: Point Theatre, Dublin

Creative team
- Composer: Bill Whelan
- Producer: Moya Doherty
- Director: John McColgan

Other information
- Starring: Michael Flatley; Jean Butler; Colin Dunne; Breandán de Gallaí; Joanne Doyle
- Origin: Interval performance act at the Eurovision Song Contest 1994
- Notable early runs: February 1995, Point Theatre, Dublin; March 1996, Radio City Music Hall, New York City
- Official website

Riverdance is a theatrical show that consists mainly of traditional Irish music and dance. With a score composed by Bill Whelan, it originated as an interval act during the Eurovision Song Contest 1994, featuring Irish dancing champions Jean Butler and Michael Flatley, and the vocal ensemble Anúna. Shortly afterwards, husband and wife production team John McColgan and Moya Doherty expanded it into a stage show, which opened in Dublin on 9 February 1995. As of 2025, the show continues touring the world.

== Background ==
Riverdance is rooted in a three-part suite of baroque-influenced traditional music called Timedance. The suite was composed, recorded and performed for the interval act of the Eurovision Song Contest 1981, thirteen years prior to the famous 1994 Eurovision interval act. For the 1981 performance, Bill Whelan and Dónal Lunny composed the music alongside Irish folk band Planxty, with accompanying dancers from Dublin City Ballet. It was later released as a Planxty single. When describing the origin of the name "Riverdance", Whelan said: "It was no mistake of mine to call it Riverdance because it connected absolutely to Timedance".

Whelan had also produced EastWind, a 1992 album by Planxty member Andy Irvine with Davy Spillane, which fused Irish and Balkan folk music and influenced the genesis of Riverdance the song.

== History ==
=== 1994 ===
External videos
- Riverdance YouTube video
- Riverdance at the Eurovision Song Contest 30 April 1994, Dublin

Riverdance was first performed during the seven-minute interval of the Eurovision Song Contest 1994 at the Point Theatre in Dublin on 30 April 1994. The performance was transmitted to an estimated 300 million viewers worldwide and earned a standing ovation. The performance is often considered the most well-known interval act in Eurovision history and is credited with transforming Irish dance from a chaste and reserved traditional dance form into a new, modern form. The original seven-minute version was invited to perform at Dominion Theatre in London at the Royal Variety Performance in the presence of Prince Charles in November 1994.

The song "Riverdance", featuring Anúna and the RTÉ Concert Orchestra, was released as a single and subsequently topped the Irish Singles Chart for a record-setting 18 weeks. As of 2010, it was still the second highest-selling single of all time in Ireland, behind only Elton John's 1997 double A-side "Candle in the Wind 1997"/"Something About the Way You Look Tonight".

=== 1995 ===
After witnessing the initial enthusiasm for the interval act performance in Ireland, husband and wife production team John McColgan and Moya Doherty invested over $1 million into producing a full-length show. Tickets for the show were released for a five-week run and sold out within three days of going on sale.

"Riverdance: The Show" opened at the Point Theatre in Dublin on 9 February 1995. The show starred lead dancers Michael Flatley and Jean Butler. The video of the show topped the Irish and UK charts in 1995.

The show moved to London in June 1995, where it had a sell-out four-week run at The Apollo. During its time in London, Riverdance performed at the Royal Gala 50th Anniversary of VE Day celebrations at the invitation of Prince Charles and at the Royal College of Music in the presence of Queen Elizabeth II.

The show returned to the Point Theatre in July 1995 for a sell-out six-week run.

The show's growing success coincided with lead dancer Michael Flatley clashing with the producers over salary and royalty fees. By early October 1995, a contract dispute over creative control led to Riverdance parting ways with Flatley on the eve of reopening for a second sell-out run at The Apollo. He was replaced by Colin Dunne. At the same time, female lead Jean Butler was unable to perform due to an injury. As a result, Dunne paired up with Eileen Martin for the opening night. The initial six weeks at The Apollo was extended twice. During this extended period, Riverdance returned to the Royal Variety Performance at Dominion Theatre.

=== 1996–1998 ===
Riverdance travelled to the United States for the first time in March 1996. On 13 March, the show opened at Radio City Music Hall in New York City for the first of eight sold-out performances over five days. Costing about $2 million to bring the show from Ireland, Riverdance broke even in its first New York outing.

Upon returning from New York, Riverdance went on to have another notable extended run at The Apollo between May 1996 and January 1997. By late 1996, Riverdance had created separate companies in order to tour multiple cities at the same time. The Lee company began a U.S. tour in October 1996. Riverdance toured Australia for the first time in 1997.

In 1997, Bill Whelan received a Best Musical Show Album Grammy Award for his recording of 'Riverdance'.

A number of notable cast departures occurred around this time, with Anúna leaving in September 1996, Butler leaving in January 1997, and Dunne leaving in June 1998.

=== Early 2000s ===
In 2000, Riverdance performed on Broadway in New York at the Gershwin Theatre. In 2003, Riverdance featured at the Opening Ceremony of the Special Olympics in Dublin and toured China for the first time.

== Legacy ==
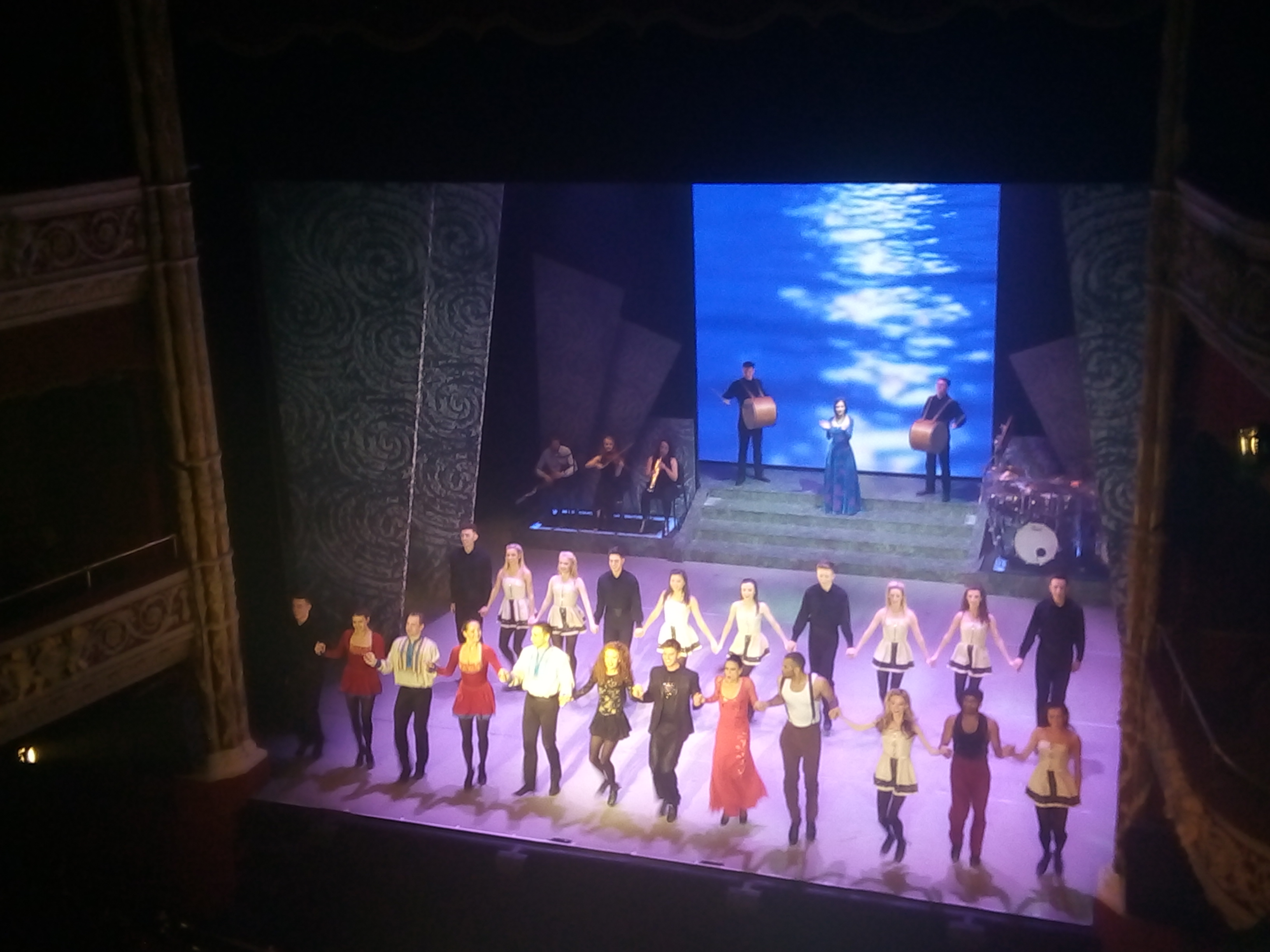
Riverdance at the Gaiety Theatre, Dublin, in 2019

In 2020, Riverdance's 25th Anniversary show began touring. As of 2023, Riverdance has played more than 15,000 performances across 49 countries and six continents. The show has been seen live by more than 30 million people.

In 2021, an animated feature film titled Riverdance: The Animated Adventure was released.

== Dance numbers and songs performed ==
Riverdance songs and dance numbers from the five live recordings of the show
Riverdance: The Show (1995) Michael Flatley & Jean Butler	Riverdance: Live From New York City (1996) Colin Dunne & Jean Butler	Riverdance: Live From Geneva (2002) Breandán de Gallaí & Joanne Doyle	Riverdance: Live From Beijing (2010) Padraic Moyles & Aislinn Ryan	Riverdance 25 Anniversary Show: Live In Dublin (2020) Bobby Hodges & Amy-Mae Dolan
1. Reel Around the Sun; 2. The Heart's Cry; 3. Countess Cathleen – Women of the Sidhe; 4. Caoineadh Chú Chulainn; 5. Distant Thunder; 6. Firedance; 7. Cloudsong / Riverdance; 8. Lift the Wings; 9. Freedom; 10. Harlem to Hollywood; 11. Andalucía; 12. Macedonian Morning; 13. Marta's Dance – The Russian Dervish; 14. Hope to the Suffering; 15. Michael Flatley Flute Solo – Whispering Winds; 16. Home and the Heartland / Heartland; 17. Finale / Riverdance International	1. Reel Around the Sun; 2. The Heart's Cry; 3. Women of Ireland / Countess Cathleen – Women of the Sidhe; 4. Caoineadh Chú Chulainn; 5. Thunderstorm; 6. Firedance; 7. Slip into Spring – The Harvest; 8. Cloudsong; 9. Riverdance; 10. American Wake (The Nova Scotia Set); 11. Lift the Wings; 12. Heal Their Hearts – Freedom; 13. Trading Taps; 14. Marta's Dance – The Russian Dervish; 15. Oscail An Doras; 16. Heartbeat of the World; 17. Homecoming; 18. Home and the Heartland; 19. Heartland; 20. Finale / Riverdance International	1. Reel Around the Sun; 2. The Heart's Cry; 3. Countess Cathleen – Women of the Sidhe; 4. Caoineadh Chú Chulainn; 5. Thunderstorm; 6. Shivna; 7. Firedance; 8. Slip into Spring – The Harvest; 9. Cloudsong; 10. Riverdance; 11. American Wake (The Nova Scotia Set); 12. Lift the Wings; 13. Heal Their Hearts – Freedom; 14. Trading Taps; 15. Macedonian Morning; 16. Marta's Dance – The Russian Dervish; 17. Andalucía; 18. Rí Rá (Oscail An Doras); 19. Slow Air / The Tunes; 20. Home and the Heartland; 21. Heartland; 22. Finale / Riverdance International	1. Reel Around the Sun; 2. The Heart's Cry; 3. Countess Cathleen – Women of the Sidhe; 4. Caoineadh Chú Chulainn; 5. Thunderstorm; 6. Shivna; 7. Firedance; 8. Slip into Spring – The Harvest; 9. Cloudsong; 10. Riverdance; 11. American Wake (The Nova Scotia Set); 12. Lift the Wings; 13. Heal Their Hearts – Freedom; 14. Trading Taps; 15. Marta's Dance – The Russian Dervish; 16. Oscail An Doras; 17. Andalucía; 18. Slow Air / The Tunes; 19. Heartland; 20. Finale / Riverdance International	1. Reel Around the Sun; 2. The Heart's Cry; 3. Countess Cathleen – Women of the Sidhe; 4. Caoineadh Chú Chulainn; 5. Thunderstorm; 6. Firedance; 7. Shivna; 8. Slip into Spring – The Harvest; 9. Cloudsong; 10. Riverdance; 11. American Wake (The Nova Scotia Set); 12. Lift the Wings; 13. Trading Taps; 14. Macedonian Morning; 15. Marta's Dance – The Russian Dervish; 16. Heartbeat of the World; 17. Andalucía; 18. Anna Livia; 19. Slow Air / The Tunes; 20. Heartland; 21. Finale / Riverdance International

== Notable lead dancers ==
- Michael Flatley
- Jean Butler
- Colin Dunne
- Breandán de Gallaí
- Joanne Doyle
- Kevin McCormack

=== Other notable dancers ===
- María Pagés (flamenco dancer)
- Michael and Matthew Gardiner (troupe dancers)

== Musicians ==
- Anúna - vocal ensemble
- Máire Breatnach - fiddle
- Ronan Browne - uilleann pipes
- Anthony Drennan - guitar
- Eileen Ivers - fiddle
- Declan Masterson - uilleann pipes, low whistle
- Katie McMahon - vocals
- Máirtín O'Connor - accordion
- Michael McGlynn - choral director
- Rafael Riqueni - guitar
- Davy Spillane - uilleann pipes, tin whistle

== Recordings ==
=== CD ===
- Riverdance: Music from the Show (1995)
- Riverdance 25th Anniversary: Music from the Show (2019)

=== VHS ===
- Riverdance: The Show (1995)

=== DVD ===
- Riverdance: A Journey (1996)
- Riverdance: Live From New York City (1996)
- Riverdance: Live From Geneva (2002)
- Riverdance: The Documentary 10 Years (2005)
- The Best Of Riverdance (2005)
- Riverdance: Live From Beijing (2010)
- Riverdance: The Collection [5 DVD Set] (2010)
- Riverdance 25 Anniversary Show: Live In Dublin (2020)

== See also ==
- The Countess Cathleen
- Cú Chulainn
- Music of Ireland

Preceded by Johnny Logan	Eurovision Song Contest; Final Interval act 1994	Succeeded by Mícheál Ó Súilleabháin
