= Cormack (surname) =

Cormack is a Scottish and Irish surname derived from the Gaelic "Mac Cormaic" and the Irish given name "Cormac".

== People with the surname ==
=== Academics ===
- Lesley Cormack (born 1957), Canadian historian of mathematics and geography
- Robert Cormack, Scottish academic
- Robin Cormack, British classicist and art historian

=== Film ===
- Bartlett Cormack, American actor, playwright, screenwriter, and producer
- Danielle Cormack, New Zealand actress
- Matthew Cormack, Australian filmmaker
- Scott Cormack, Irish film assistant director, and art director

=== Literature ===
- Karen Mac Cormack, British/Canadian poet
- Patrick Cormack, English politician and writer
- William Cormack, Scottish-Canadian explorer and author

=== Science ===
- Allan McLeod Cormack, South African-American Nobel prize winner as co-inventor of computed tomography
- Gordon Cormack, Canadian computer scientist and co-inventor of the DMC data compression algorithm

=== Sport ===
- Christian Cormack, British rowing cox
- Graham Cormack, Scottish curler
- Joe Cormack, Australian footballer
- John Cormack, Irish sportsman
- Paul Cormack, former English cricketer
- Peter Cormack, Scottish footballer

=== Other fields ===
- Arthur Cormack, Scottish singer and musician
- Magnus Cormack, Australian politician
- Minnie Cormack (1862 - 1919), Irish-British painter and engraver
- Peter McKenzie Cormack, crew member of the SS Sauternes
- Teresa Cormack, New Zealand murder victim

== See also ==
- Carmack
- McCormack
