= Kevin McCormack (dancer) =

Irish dancer

Kevin McCormack (born 1970) is a former professional Irish dancer who spent many years as a Dance Captain with Riverdance. The Dublin native was part of the original 24 troupe members for Riverdance's seven-minute interval act at the 1994 Eurovision Song Contest. A 10-time World Irish Dance Champion, McCormack holds ADCRG titleship which means he is recognised by An Coimisiún Le Rincí Gaelacha, the governing body of Irish dancing worldwide, as being qualified to adjudicate Irish Step dancing on any competitive level throughout the world.

McCormack began dancing at the age of three years due to his parents' influence. He graduated from Trinity College in Dublin with a Bachelor of Science in pharmacy, and subsequently gave up dancing to become a pharmacist. However, he started up again in 1994 when Riverdance producer Moya Doherty began looking for dancers to perform in Eurovision's interval act. McCormack was one of the first dancers selected for the performance in which his brother, Ronan, also featured. McCormack went on to tour with the show for six years. He was Dance Captain for the Lee and Lagan companies, as well as a principal understudy to Michael Patrick Gallagher.
