= Evan MacCormick =

New Zealand cricketer

- Auckland in January 1904, MacCormick standing second from left

Personal information
- Born: 15 March 1882; Auckland, New Zealand
- Died: 13 November 1918 (aged 36); Auckland, New Zealand
- Relatives: Charles MacCormick (brother); Arthur MacCormick (brother)

Domestic team information
- Years: Team
- 1900/01–1913/14: Auckland

Career statistics
Competition	First-class
Matches	13
Runs scored	329
Batting average	14.95
100s/50s	0/1
Top score	77
Balls bowled	18
Wickets	0
Bowling average	–
5 wickets in innings	–
10 wickets in match	–
Best bowling	–
Catches/stumpings	1/–
- Source: ESPNcricinfo, 13 January 2020

Evan MacCormick (15 March 1882 – 13 November 1918) was a New Zealand cricketer. He played thirteen first-class matches for Auckland between 1900 and 1914.

MacCormick was educated at Auckland Grammar School and became a barrister and solicitor, a partner in an Auckland law firm. His highest first-class score was 77, the highest score in the match, when Auckland lost narrowly to the touring MCC in 1906-07. He was the outstanding batsman of the Auckland Cricket Association competition in 1914–15, scoring 809 runs at an average of 101.12, with four centuries.

MacCormick died in November 1918 after contracting influenza and then pneumonia.
