= McCormick Gap =

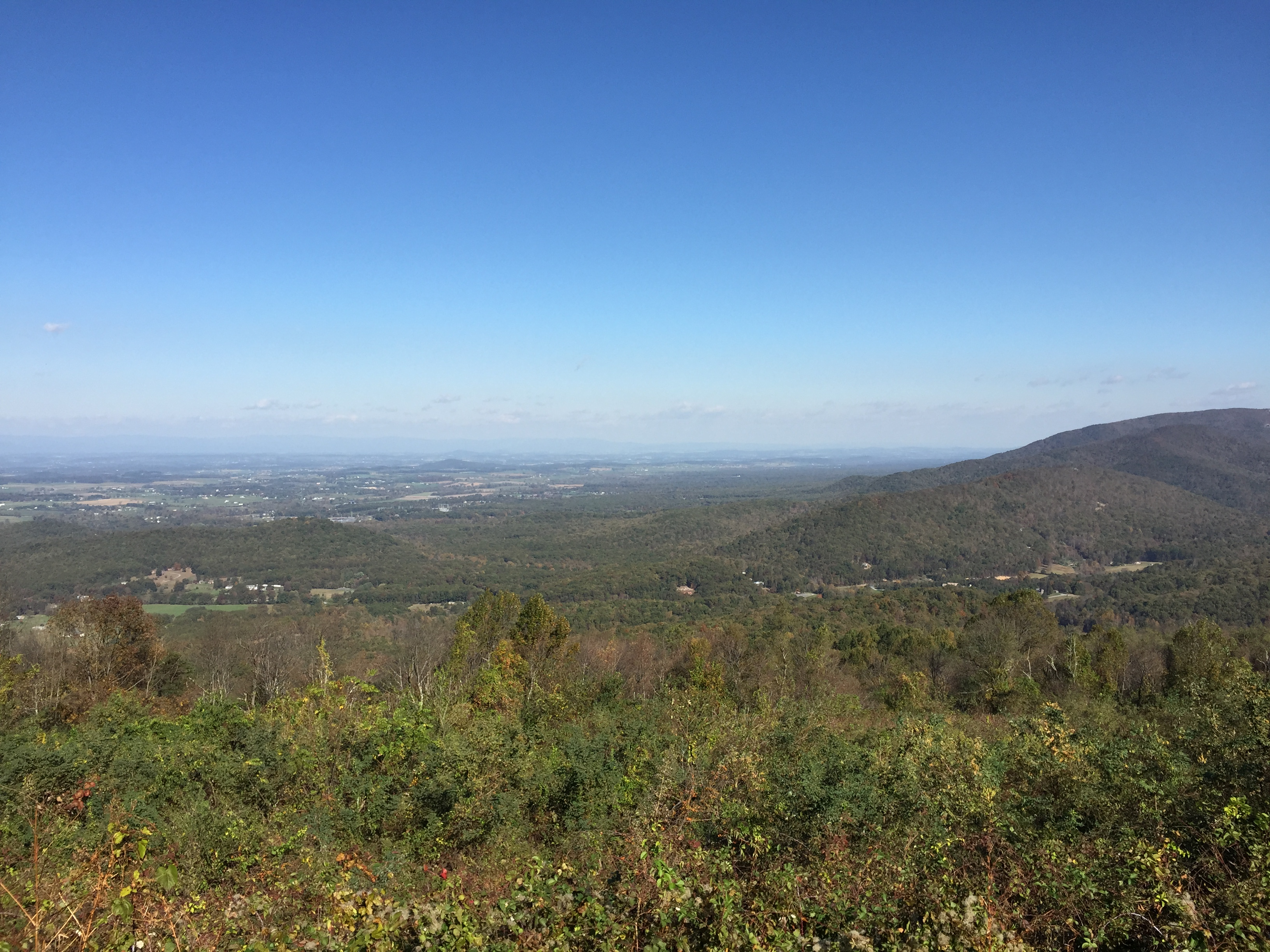
- View north-northwest from the McCormick Gap Overlook

- Location within Virginia
- Elevation: 2,441 feet (744 m)
- Traversed by: Blue Ridge Parkway

Third Approach
- Location: Border of Augusta and Albemarle County counties, Virginia, United States
- Range: Blue Ridge Mountains
- Coordinates: 38°03′36″N 78°49′04″W
- Topo map: Waynesboro East

McCormick Gap is a wind gap located in the Blue Ridge Mountains east of Rockfish Gap.
