= Cami McCormick =

American radio journalist (born 1961)

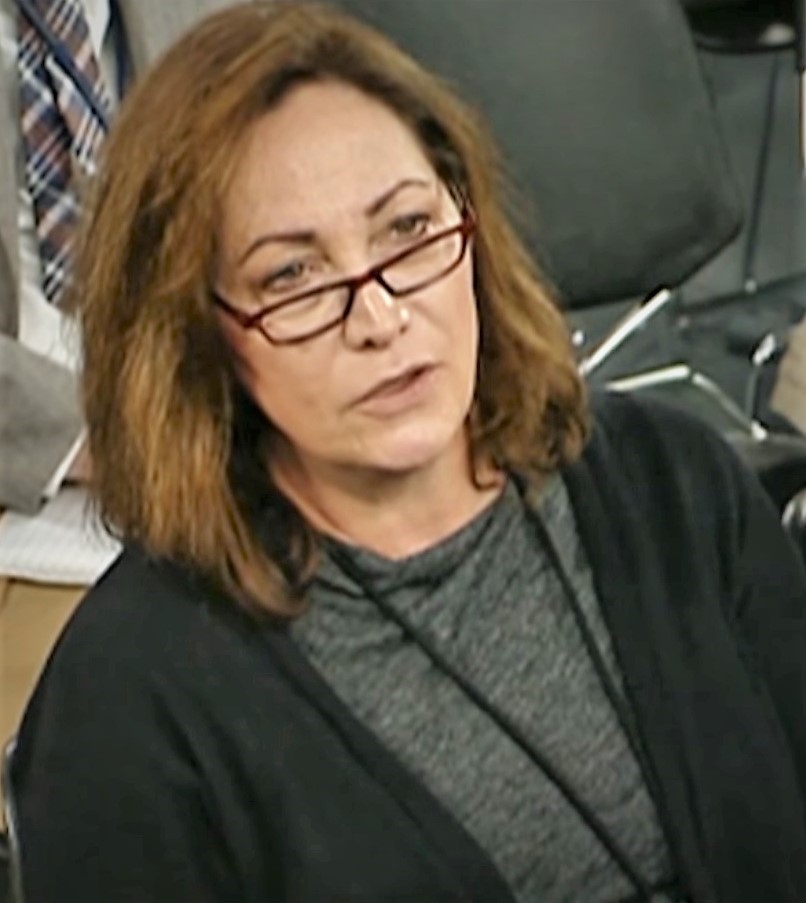
McCormick asks a question at a US Army media briefing in 2016.

Cami McCormick (born November 5, 1961) is a radio journalist for CBS News who previously worked for CNN. She was injured in Afghanistan on August 28, 2009, when the vehicle in which she was traveling was hit by an improvised explosive device.

== Professional career ==
McCormick worked in the 1980s and early 1990s as a morning news broadcaster on WEZB (B-97FM) in New Orleans with "Cajun" Ken Cooper, then later with Walton and Johnson in the mornings.

In 1991, McCormick moved to Moscow in hopes of becoming a foreign correspondent. While there, McCormick initially did radio spots for the Associated Press, and eventually got the opportunity to put together morning programming for a new radio station in Moscow. In early 1992, the show—titled "Moscow in the Morning"—went on the air on Radio Maximum, with McCormick and fellow American Charles Bornstein as co-hosts. The three-hour show was the first English-language radio program in Russia. The program was not designed as a moneymaker; instead, it was created as a way to promote the station and attract new advertisers. "We always understood that it would not last forever," McCormick told The Moscow Times in 1994. "It was not put on the air to make money." The show ended on July 9, 1994.

From 1994 until 1998, McCormick worked for CNN as a reporter, writer, producer and anchor. In September 1998, McCormick joined CBS News as a New York-based radio anchor and as a radio correspondent.

In her career, McCormick has been awarded six Edward R. Murrow Awards.

== Injury in Afghanistan in 2009 ==
On August 28, 2009, McCormick was injured while in Afghanistan reporting for CBS News. McCormick was traveling in a vehicle with members of the United States Army when their vehicle was hit by an improvised explosive device (IED). She was initially treated at a field hospital, where she underwent surgery to stabilize her condition. McCormick then was taken to Bagram Air Base in Afghanistan for additional treatment. An American serviceman was killed in the same explosion. She has since returned to reporting for CBS news.

Since returning to work Cami has covered both the State Department and the Pentagon.

== See also ==
- Embedded journalism
