= Robert J. McCormick =

Robert McCormick

Director of the Center For Child Advocacy and Policy

Personal details
- Born: Robert De Nigris Mazza James McCormick; April 3, 1948 (age 78) New York City, U.S.
- Died: January 3, 2014 (aged 65) New Jersey
- Party: Democratic
- Education: St. John's University; Rutgers Law School; CUNY; Rutgers University

Robert DeNigris McCormick (1948-2014) was the head of the Center for Child Advocacy and Policy program CHAD, run by Montclair State University. Concurrently he was also a full-time psychologist, a teacher, and a lawyer. The Child Advocacy program is supported by the Division of Child Protection and Permanency (DCPP) formerly known as the Division of Youth and Family Services (DYFS).

McCormick died unexpectedly on January 3, 2014.

== Early life and education ==
Robert McCormick was born in Manhattan, New York, the son of Florence D. (née Mazza) and Robert McCormick, Sr., an architect. His father was of Irish descent, and his mother was of Italian ancestry. He was raised in Brooklyn, graduating from James Madison High School in 1965. He graduated from St. John's University in 1969 and received a masters degree from Queens College, City University of New York. He McCormick had moved to Colombia with his family, and got his first glimpse of poverty stricken children. It is said that this was his first kicker into helping children who were abused.

McCormick graduated from the City University of New York with a Ph.D. in 18th Century Spanish Literature in 1976. He earned a Ph.D. in psychology from Rutgers University and a J.D. from Rutgers Law School in Newark, New Jersey.
