= Fred Ball (footballer) =

Australian rules footballer (1868–1902)

Personal information
- Full name: Frederick Charles Ball
- Nickname: Snowy
- Born: 1 September 1868; Vaughan, Victoria
- Died: 4 September 1902 (aged 34); Islington, London, England
- Original team: Scotch College

Playing career^{1}
Years	Club	Games (Goals)
1888-96	Essendon (VFA)	158 (29)
1897	Essendon (VFL)	5 (1)
Total		163 (309)
- ^{1} Playing statistics correct to the end of 1897.

Frederick Charles Ball (1 September 1868 – 4 September 1902) was an Australian rules footballer who played with Essendon in the Victorian Football Association (VFA) and in the Victorian Football League (VFL).

== Family ==
The son of Charles Ball (1818-1876), founder of Ball & Welch, and Tabitha Ball (1842-1919), née Reardon, Frederick Charles Ball was born at Vaughan, Victoria on 1 September 1868.

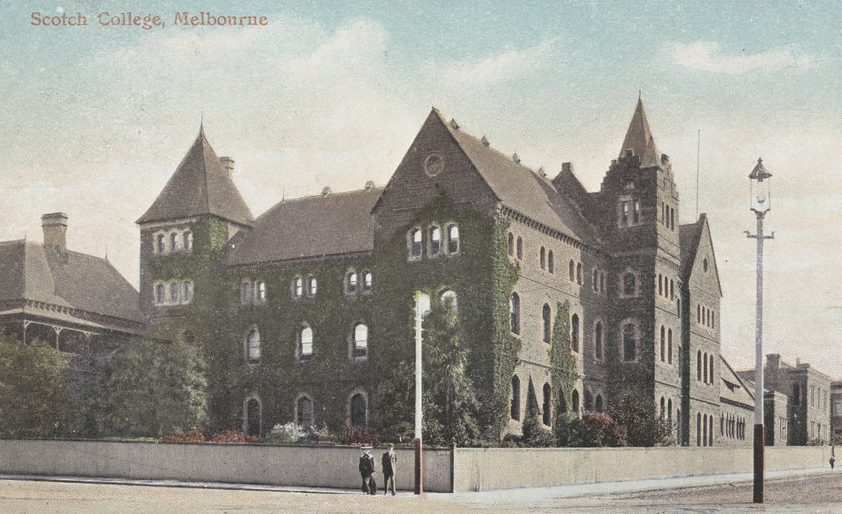
Scotch College at East Melbourne.

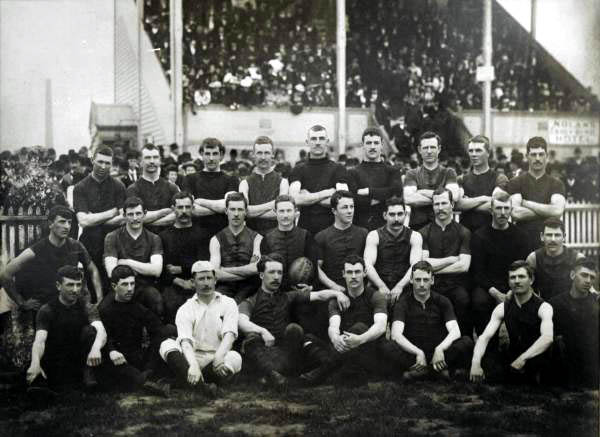
Essendon Football Team (1893). Fred Ball is in the middle row, fourth to right of team captain, Alick Dick (holding the football).

== Education ==
He was educated at Scotch College, Melbourne.

== Football ==
He was recruited from Scotch College; which, at the time, was located in East Melbourne, within easy walking distance of Essendon's home ground, the East Melbourne Cricket Ground.

"Having many influential patrons and supporters, [Essendon] was in a good financial position and was able to call upon all the leading Public School and College boys and leading junior players by holding out better prospects for their future employment and careers as well as their social positions." (Maplestone, 1996, p. 37)

=== Essendon (VFA) ===
He played in 158 games (29 goals) for Essendon in the VFA, between 1888 and 1896.

=== Essendon (VFL) ===
He played in 5 games (1 goal) for Essendon in the VFL in 1897.

== Death ==
He later moved to London; and, in September 1902, was found dead in his home in Islington with stab wounds. An inquest determined that he had committed suicide.
