= McCormack =

- Pronunciation: (Muh-core-mack)

Origin
- Meaning: "son of Cormac'"
- Region of origin: Ireland, Scotland

Other names
- Variant forms: [[Cormack (surname)|]], MacCormack, McCormick, MacCormick, Cormac, Cormach, Cormich, Cormiche, Mac Cormaic

McCormack is a Scottish and Irish surname that originated in Ireland and Scotland. Spelling variations include: Cormack, MacCormack, MacCormac, McCormac, Cormac, Cormach.

== Architecture ==
- Sir Richard MacCormac, (1938–2014), British architect, founder of MJP Architects

== Business ==
- Arthur John McCormack (1865–1936), English businessman associated with Wolseley Motors
- Derek McCormack (academic), New Zealand professor and administrator
- Emmet J. McCormack (1880–1965), US director and treasurer, One of the founders of Moore-McCormack

== Entertainment ==
- Adetokumboh McCormack (born 1982), Sierra Leone-born American actor
- Ange McCormack (born 1996 or 1997), Australian journalist and radio presenter
- Catherine McCormack (born 1972), English actress
- Danielle McCormack (born 1983), English actress
- Daryl McCormack (born 1992/1993), Irish actor
- David McCormack (born 1968), Australian singer and songwriter
- Eric McCormack (born 1963), Canadian-born American actor
- Franklyn MacCormack (1906–1971), American radio personality
- Geoffrey MacCormack known as Warren Peace, English vocalist
- John McCormack (1884–1945), Irish tenor singer
- Kevin McCormack (born 1970), Irish dancer
- Mary McCormack (born 1969), American actress
- Niamh McCormack (born 2001), Irish actress
- Patty McCormack (born 1945), US actress
- Sean McCormack, sound editor
- Will McCormack (born 1974), American actor, brother of Mary

== Fictional characters ==
- Cliff McCormack, fictional character on The CW television series Veronica Mars
- Clive McCormack, fictional character in the video game The Getaway
- Ren McCormack, fictional character in the film Footloose (1984)

== Law ==
- Beth McCormack, lawyer and academic administrator
- Bridget Mary McCormack (born 1966), Justice of the Michigan Supreme Court (January 1, 2013 – Present)
- Michael McCormack (born 1939), US state judge (Nebraska)
- Mike McCormack, Toronto Police officer and Toronto Police Association president
- William J. McCormack (police officer) (1933–2016), Mauritius-born Canadian Chief of Police

== Literature ==
- Derek McCormack (born 1969), Canadian writer
- Mike McCormack (born 1965), Irish writer
- Tara McCormack, British academic and author
- Una McCormack (born 1972), British-Irish novelist

== Medicine ==
- Henry MacCormac, Irish dermatologist and physician who served as a lieutenant-colonel in Royal Army Medical Corps during the First World War
- Henry MacCormac, (1800–1886), Irish physician who advocated open-air theory
- William MacCormac, (1836–1901), British surgeon who served as the President of the Royal College of Surgeons of England.

== Military ==
- James McCormack (1910–1975), United States Army officer who served in World War II, and was later the first Director of Military Applications of the United States Atomic Energy Commission

== Politics ==
- Billy McCormack (1928–2012), director and vice president of the Christian Coalition of America and pastor of University Worship Center in Shreveport, Louisiana
- Edward J. McCormack, Jr. (1923–1997), Massachusetts Attorney General, nephew of John William McCormack
- Ellen McCormack (1926–2011), US third-party candidate for US president in 1980
- John McCormac, US politician (Democratic Party)
- John William McCormack (1891–1980), US Representative from Massachusetts and Speaker of the United States House of Representatives
- Michael McCormack (born 1964), Australian Member of Parliament
- Mike McCormack (1921–2020), US Representative from Washington
- Pádraic McCormack (born 1942), Irish delegate to Teachta Dála
- Richard T. McCormack (born 1941), United States Ambassador to the Organization of American States and United States Under Secretary of State for Economic and Agricultural Affairs
- Sean McCormack (born 1964), US Assistant Secretary of State
- William McCormack (1879–1947), Australian politician, Premier of Queensland

== Sports ==
- Alan McCormack (born 1984), Irish footballer
- Charlie McCormack (1895–1975), Scottish footballer
- Chris McCormack (triathlete) (born 1973), Australian triathlete
- Damien McCormack (born 1987), Australian rules footballer
- David McCormack (basketball) (born 1999), American basketball player
- Don McCormack (born 1955), American baseball player
- Fergal McCormack (born 1974), Irish hurler and Gaelic footballer
- Frank MacCormack (born 1954), baseball pitcher for Detroit Tigers, Seattle Mariners
- Jack McCormack (Australian rules footballer) (1904–1966), Australian rules footballer
- Jack McCormack (rugby league) (1904–1996), Australian rugby league footballer
- John McCormack, several sportspeople
- Mark McCormack (1930–2003), American lawyer, sports agent and writer, founder and chairman of IMG
- Mike McCormack (American football) (1930–2013), American football player (Cleveland Browns) and coach
- Ross McCormack (born 1986), Scottish footballer
- Steve McCormack (born c.1973), Scottish rugby league coach
- Tom McCormack (Erin's Own hurler) (1888–1959), Irish hurler for Kilkenny and Erin's Own

== Other genre ==
- Billy McCormack (1928–2012), American clergyman
- Bruce L. McCormack (born 1952), professor of theology at Princeton Theological Seminary
- Franklyn MacCormack (1906–1971), US radio personality in Chicago
- Gavan McCormack, Australian historian and orientalist
- Hilary McCormack (1934–2022), New Zealand advocate for the Deaf community
- Sir William MacCormac, 1st Baronet (1836–1901), British surgeon

== Other ==
- MacCormack method, a discretization scheme for the numerical solution of partial differential equations. It is introduced by Robert W. MacCormack in 1969.
- McCormack Motorsports, former Indy Racing League team owned by Dennis McCormack that operated from 1996 to 2001.
- McCormack, Minnesota, an unorganized territory in St. Louis County, Minnesota

== See also ==
- McCormac
- Carmack
- Cormac
- Cormack (surname)
- Cromack
- McCormick (surname)
