= Ted Kinnear =

Australian rules footballer (1874–1965)

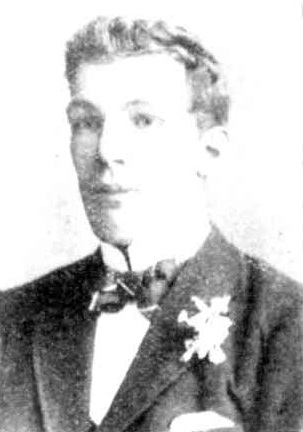
- Kinnear in 1901

Personal information
- Full name: Edward Hore Kinnear
- Born: 27 October 1874; Essendon, Victoria
- Died: 3 March 1965 (aged 90); Essendon, Victoria
- Original team: Essendon District
- Positions: Follower, forward

Playing career^{1}
Years	Club	Games (Goals)
1895–1896	Essendon (VFA)	35 (8)
1897–1903	Essendon	108 (31)
Total		143 (39)
- ^{1} Playing statistics correct to the end of 1903.

Career highlights
- 2× VFL premiership player: 1897, 1901

Edward Hore Kinnear (27 October 1874 – 3 March 1965) was an Australian rules footballer who played for the Essendon Football Club in the Victorian Football League (VFL).

== Family ==
The son of George Steemson Kinnear (1825-1902), and his second wife, Susannah Hamlyn Kinnear (1840-1927), née Hore, Edward Hore Kinnear was born at Essendon, Victoria on 27 October 1874.

He married Jessie Frew Connelly (1877-1944) on 18 September 1901. They had eight children: four sons, and four daughters.

== Football ==
=== Essendon (VFA) ===
Recruited from local club, Essendon District, in 1895, Kinnear played in 35 games and scored 8 goals for Essendon in the 1895 and 1896 (pre-VFL) VFA competition.

=== Essendon (VFL) ===
Playing in the back-pocket, Kinnear was part of the team that played in Essendon's first VFL match against Geelong, at Corio Oval, on 8 May 1897. He was also part of the Essendon team that won the 1897 premiership -- it is significant that, because the Essendon team had won the end-of-season round-robin competition contested by the top four home-and-away teams, there was no "Grand Final" required in 1897.

He was used as a full-forward in 1901 and kicked 16 goals, including five in a win over Carlton. Kinnear was a member of the Essendon team that won the premiership in the 1901 Grand Final match, against Collingwood, on 7 September 1901.

He was Essendon's vice-captain in 1901 and 1902, was acting-captain on eleven occasions in those two years, and retired as a footballer after the match against Collingwood, at Victoria park, on 8 June 1903.

In all he appeared in ten final matches, with losing grand finals in 1898 and 1902.

=== 100 VFL games ===
Towards the end of his career, and playing as a follower, Kinnear became the first Essendon player to reach 100 VFL games — that is, in addition to his 35 games for the Essendon team in the (pre-VFL) VFA competition in the 1895 and 1896 seasons — a milestone he reached when playing against Fitzroy in the 1902 Preliminary Final on 13 September 1902.

== Mayor of Essendon ==
An Essendon councillor from 1911 to 1934, he served as the Lord Mayor of Essendon in 1919 and 1920.

== Rope-maker ==
He had a highly successful commercial career over many years as the chairman of the major Australian rope-makers, George Kinnear & Sons Pty Ltd, until he retired at the age of 89.

== Death ==
He died at his Essendon residence on 3 March 1965; and, with his old team-mate Joe Groves having died four years earlier (on 3 July 1961), at the time of his death Kinnear was the last surviving player of Essendon's 1897 premiership team.
