= George Hastings (footballer) =

Australian rules footballer and umpire

Personal information
- Full name: George Albert Hastings
- Born: 13 January 1877; Belfast, Victoria
- Died: 29 January 1956 (aged 79); Leongatha, Victoria
- Original team: North Melbourne (VFA)

Playing career^{1}
Years	Club	Games (Goals)	
1897–1904	Essendon	107 (25)	

Umpiring career
Years	League	Role	Games
1905–10	VFL	Field umpire	8
- ^{1} Playing statistics correct to the end of 1904.

Career highlights
- 2× VFL premiership player: 1897, 1901

George Albert Hastings (13 January 1877 – 29 January 1956) was an Australian rules footballer who played for Essendon Football Club in the early years of the Victorian Football League (VFL).

Hastings usually played on the wing but was also a centreman at times. A member of Essendon's inaugural premiership team in 1897 and again in 1901, Hastings also played in losing Grand Final sides in 1898 and 1902. He represented the Victorian interstate team against South Australia in 1903. His career ended when he began suffering from rheumatic fever and he later returned to the VFL as an umpire.

== Sources ==
- George Hastings's playing statistics from AFL Tables
- Essendon Football Club profile
