= Ned Officer =

Australian rules footballer

Personal information
- Full name: Edward Albert Officer
- Born: 29 March 1869; Tower Hill, Victoria
- Died: 10 June 1927 (aged 58); Perth, Western Australia
- Original teams: Warrnambool (HFL); Geelong College
- Position: Full-back

Playing career^{1}
Years	Club	Games (Goals)
1891–1896	Essendon (VFA)	105 (10)
1897–1898	Essendon (VFL)	18 (0)
- ^{1} Playing statistics correct to the end of 1898.

Career highlights
- VFA premiership player 1891–1894; VFL premiership player: 1897

Edward Albert Officer (29 March 1869 – 10 June 1927) was an Australian rules footballer who played for the Essendon Football Club in both the Victorian Football Association (VFA) and the Victorian Football League (VFL).

== Career ==
In his first four seasons, he played in Essendon's successive premierships, and played in a fifth in the first year of the VFL competition under the captaincy of good friend George Stuckey. Officer made his VFL debut against Geelong in Round 1 of the season, at Corio Oval.

After retiring from football, Officer moved to Perth and practiced as a physician until his death in 1927.
