= Gus Officer =

Australian rules footballer

Personal information
- Full name: Augustus Percy Officer
- Born: 15 September 1875; Koroit, Victoria
- Died: 25 February 1935 (aged 59); Warrnambool, Victoria
- Original team: Warrnambool
- Height: 173 cm (5 ft 8 in)

Playing career^{1}
Years	Club	Games (Goals)
1897–1900	Essendon	48 (12)
- ^{1} Playing statistics correct to the end of 1900.

Augustus Percy "Gus" Officer (15 September 1875 – 25 February 1935) was an Australian rules footballer who played with Essendon in the Victorian Football League (VFL).
