= Pat O'Loughlin =

Australian rules footballer

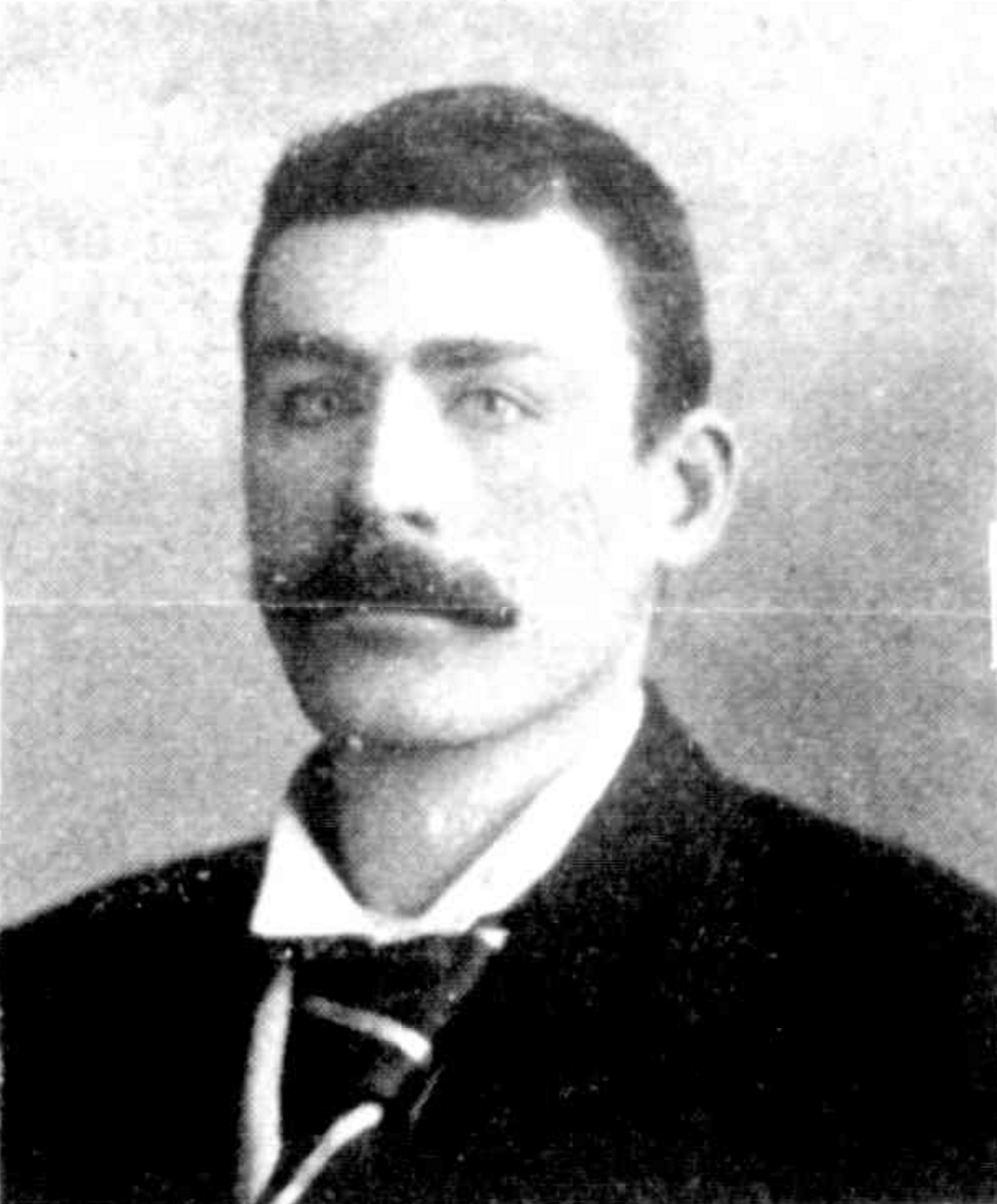
- O'Loughlin in 1899

Personal information
- Full name: Patrick Joseph O'Loughlin
- Born: 29 October 1873; Heidelberg, Victoria
- Died: 14 August 1956 (aged 82); Brunswick, Victoria
- Original team: Brunswick (VFA)

Playing career^{1}
Years	Club	Games (Goals)
1897–1902	Essendon	74 (18)
- ^{1} Playing statistics correct to the end of 1902.

Career highlights
- VFL premiership player: 1897

Patrick Joseph O'Loughlin (29 October 1873 – 14 August 1956) was an Australian rules footballer who played for the Essendon Football Club in the Victorian Football League (VFL). In the first year of competition, 1897, he became one of the club's and league's first premiership players. O'Loughlin made his VFL debut against Geelong in round 1 of the season at Corio Oval.
