= George Vautin =

Australian rules footballer & cricketer (1869–1949)

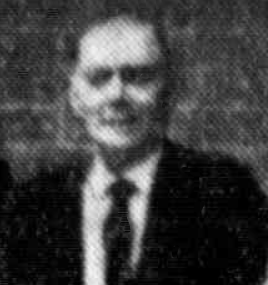
- Born: George James Phillips Vautin; 23 April 1869; Orielton, Tasmania
- Died: 9 January 1949 (aged 79); East Melbourne, Victoria
Australian rules football career
Personal information
- Original team: City (Hobart)
Playing career^{1}
| Years | Club | Games (Goals) |
| 1892–1896 | Essendon (VFA) | 87 (13) |
| 1897–1898 | Essendon | 26 (1) |
| Total | | 113 (14) |
- ^{1} Playing statistics correct to the end of 1898.
Career highlights
- VFA premiership player 1892–1894; VFL premiership player: 1897
- Cricket career

Cricket information
- Batting: Right-handed

Domestic team information
- Years: Team
- 1889/90: Tasmania
- 1894/95: Victoria
- FC debut: 8 January 1890 Tasmania v Victoria
- Last FC: 26 January 1895 Victoria v Tasmania

Career statistics
| Competition | First-class |
|---|---|
| Matches | 2 |
| Runs scored | 55 |
| Batting average | 18.33 |
| 100s/50s | 0/0 |
| Top score | 44 |
| Catches/stumpings | 1/– |
- Source: CricketArchive, 28 January 2023

George James Phillips Vautin (23 April 1869 – 9 January 1949) was an Australian sportsman who played Australian rules football for the Essendon Football Club in the Victorian Football League (VFL) and first-class cricket for both Tasmania and Victoria.

== Family ==
Vautin was born in Orielton, Tasmania and died in the Mercy Hospital in East Melbourne.

== Football ==
Vautin was from Tasmania and played at the City Football Club in Hobart. A rover, he represented his league in 1889 in an away series in Victoria, impressing the Essendon recruiters who signed him up for the 1892 VFA season and he was a key part of their premiership teams over the next three seasons. The VFL began in 1897 and Vautin was a member of Essendon's inaugural VFL premiership side.

== Cricket ==
Vautin was also a cricketer, playing a first-class match for Tasmania in 1889/90 and another for Victoria in 1894/95. He played club cricket for East Melbourne Cricket Club and St Kilda Cricket Club during the 1890s.

== See also ==
- The Footballers' Alphabet
