= Bert Salkeld =

Australian rules footballer

Personal information
- Full name: Albert Ernest Salkeld
- Nickname: Baron
- Born: 24 May 1876; Clunes, Victoria
- Died: 26 May 1917 (aged 41); St Pancras, London
- Original team: Melbourne (VFA)

Playing career^{1}
Years	Club	Games (Goals)
1895	Melbourne (VFA)	1 (0)
1896	Essendon (VFA)	15 (3)
1897	Essendon	5 (3)
- ^{1} Playing statistics correct to the end of 1897.

Albert Ernest Salkeld (24 May 1876 – 26 May 1917) was an Australian rules footballer who played for the Essendon Football Club in the Victorian Football League (VFL).

== Family ==
The son of Robert Salkeld (1833-1897), and Annie Salkeld (1837-1919), née Carey, Albert Ernest Salkeld was born at Clunes, Victoria on 24 May 1876.

== Education ==
Educated at Christian Brothers' College, Victoria Parade, and at the medical faculty of the University of Melbourne, in 1893, to study medicine. Rather than completing his medical qualification in Melbourne, he went to Scotland, in pursuit of the conjoint medical and surgical qualification available to international medical candidates, known as the "Scottish Triple".

== Football ==
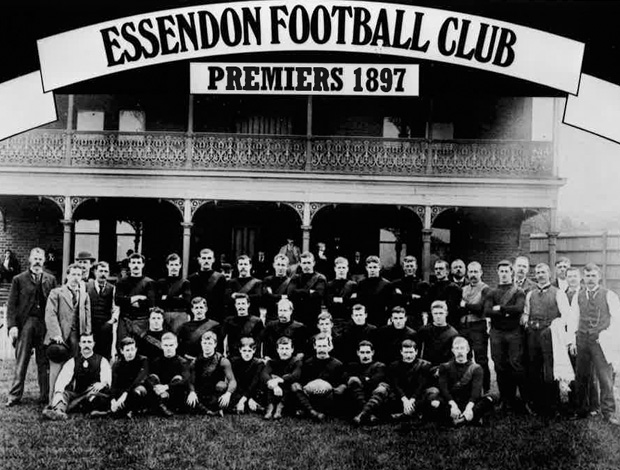
Essendon Football Club Team (1897) Salkeld is fifth player from the left, back row.

=== Melbourne (VFA) ===
Recruited from Melbourne University, he played in one game for Melbourne in the VFA in 1895.

=== Essendon (VFA) ===
Following a clearance from Melbourne, played 15 games for Essendon in the VFA in 1896.

=== Essendon (VFL) ===
He played for Essendon, as a follower, in the team's first five matches in the new VFL competition in 1897. He was injured, playing for a representative VFL side against a combined Bendigo Football Association team, at Bendigo, on 9 June 1897, and did not play again.

== Surgeon ==
He passed the third year examinations in Scotland in 1898, and concluded his Scottish medical studies in 1900. On 14 December 1904 (Register no.2522), Albert Ernest Salkeld, L.R.C.P. Edin. (Licentiate of the Royal College of Physicians of Edinburgh) 1900, L.R.C.S. Edin. (Licentiate of the Royal College of Surgeons of Edinburgh) 1900, L.F.P.S. Glasg. (Licentiate of the Faculty of Physicians and Surgeons of Glasgow) 1900, was entered into in the New South Wales Register of Medical Practitioners. For a number of years he was employed as a surgeon at the Northern Hospital at Liverpool, in England.

=== Civil Surgeon ===
He served as a "Civil Surgeon" with the Royal Army Medical Corps, during the Second Boer War (1899-1902). As a "Civil Surgeon" he was on the S.S. Montrose, that left Point Natal on 15 July 1902 repatriating Australian and New Zealand troops bound for Albany, Western Australia, Victoria, and Wellington, New Zealand. Immediately upon his arrival at Melbourne, on 11 August 1902, he was admitted to a private hospital and operated upon for pleural empyema.

== Military service ==
He later moved to England and enlisted to serve in the Royal Army Medical Corps in World War I.

"Temporary Captain Albert Ernest Salkeld is dismissed the service [on 15 February 1917] by sentence of a general court-martial [conducted at Guildhall, London on 31 January 1917]." — British Medical Journal, 10 March 1917.

== Death ==
He died in London on 26 May 1917. His death was not related to his military service.
