= George Martin (footballer, born 1875) =

Australian rules footballer

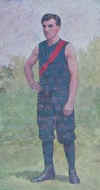

Personal information
- Full name: George Arthur Martin
- Born: 26 January 1875; Brunswick, Victoria
- Died: 2 September 1943 (aged 68); St Kilda, Victoria
- Original team: Brunswick

Playing career^{1}
| Years | Club | Games (Goals) |
| 1897–1904 | Essendon | 105 (34) |
- ^{1} Playing statistics correct to the end of 1904.

Career highlights
- 2× VFL premiership player: 1897, 1901

George Arthur Martin (26 January 1875 – 2 September 1943) was an Australian rules footballer who played for the Essendon Football Club in the Victorian Football League (VFL).

A ruckman, Martin was a dual premiership player at Essendon, playing in the inaugural VFL premiership side in 1897 and again in 1901. He was sacked from the club during the 1904 after a disagreement with the board and finished his career with Essendon Association in the Victorian Football Association (VFA).

== Sources ==
- George Martin's playing statistics from AFL Tables
- George Martin at AustralianFootball.com
- Essendon Football Club profile
