= Joe Groves =

Australian rules footballer

Personal information
- Full name: Joseph Henry Groves
- Born: 18 May 1874; Ballarat East, Victoria
- Died: 3 July 1961 (aged 87); Macleod, Victoria
- Original team: Footscray (VFA)

Playing career^{1}
| Years | Club | Games (Goals) |
| 1897–1900, 1908 | Essendon | 58 (0) |
- ^{1} Playing statistics correct to the end of 1908.

Career highlights
- VFL premiership player: 1897

Joe "Corker" Groves (18 May 1874 – 3 July 1961) was an Australian rules footballer who played for the Essendon Football Club in the Victorian Football League (VFL). A smart winger whose tact overpowered other players, he played in Essendon's first premiership side in 1897. After leaving Essendon in 1900, he had stints with Footscray and North Melbourne in the Victorian Football Association (VFA), and later returned to play one game in the 1908 VFL season.

== Sources ==
- Holmesby, Russell & Main, Jim (2007). The Encyclopedia of AFL Footballers. 7th ed. Melbourne: Bas Publishing.
- Joe Groves's playing statistics from AFL Tables
- Essendon Football Club profile
