= Bob McCormick (Australian footballer) =

Australian rules footballer

Personal information
- Full name: Bob McCormick
- Born: 12 April 1879
- Died: 25 August 1957 (aged 78)

Playing career^{1}
Years	Club	Games (Goals)
1897	Essendon	1 (0)
- ^{1} Playing statistics correct to the end of 1897.

Bob McCormick (12 April 1879 – 25 August 1957) was an Australian rules footballer who played with Essendon in the Victorian Football League (VFL).
