= Charlie Moore (Australian rules footballer) =

Australian rules footballer (1875–1901)

Personal information
- Full name: Walter Charles Moore
- Born: 24 September 1875; Colony of Fiji
- Died: 12 May 1901 (aged 25); Kwaggashoek Farm, Orange Free State (now South Africa)
- Original team: Albert-park (VFA)
- Debut: Round 9, 1897, Essendon vs. Collingwood, at Victoria Park

Playing career^{1}
Years	Club	Games (Goals)
1897–1899	Essendon	30 (34)
- ^{1} Playing statistics correct to the end of 1899.

Career highlights
- Essendon leading goalkicker 1898 (20 goals)

Walter Charles Moore (24 September 1875 – 12 May 1901) was an Australian rules footballer who played for Albert Park and South Melbourne in the Victorian Football Association (VFA) and for Essendon in the Victorian Football League (VFL). He served as a trooper in the Anglo-Boer War, but died of wounds after a battle.

He was the first Fijian-born player in the VFL/AFL and the first VFL player to die on active service in any war.

== Private life ==
The third son (the sixth child of twelve) of George Moore (1843–1925) and Elizabeth Jane née Cazaly (1845–1924), Walter Charles Moore was born in Fiji on 24 September 1875.

His mother was the aunt of Roy Cazaly; making Moore Cazaly's cousin. His eldest sister, Edith (1868–1907), was married to Sir Francis Pratt Winter (1848–1919). Moore married Rose Alice Walters (1872–1924) on 9 May 1898 at Fitzroy, Victoria; they had one child, George Clarence Leonard Moore (1898–1967), born in Collingwood on 8 November 1898.

His father the Hon. George Moore, originally a soldier, worked as a government official in Fiji from 1872. In 1876 he was appointed as the first Government Surveyor; in 1880 was promoted to Staff Surveyor; and in 1899 he became the Commissioner of Lands, Works, and Water Supply, and the Crown Surveyor. He was awarded the Imperial Service Order for his service in 1903. At the time of Moore's death in South Africa, his father resided in Fiji, and his mother and sister lived at 46 St Vincent Place, Albert Park — the street surrounding the park in which a memorial to Charlie Moore would later be erected.

== Footballer ==
Moore played for the Albert Park Football Club — and possibly the South Melbourne Football Club — in the Victorian Football Association before playing in the VFL. He made his debut for Essendon in the first season of the VFL, on 3 July 1897, against Collingwood at Victoria Park.

Although short (169 cm; 5 ft 6 1/2 in), Moore played at full-forward for Essendon. At a time when a team's best goal-kicker usually played at centre half-forward, he was their leading goal-kicker in 1898 (his first full season), kicking 20 goals. In just 15 games, he came fifth in the competition's goal-kicking list. In three seasons he played a total of 30 senior games for Essendon, kicking 34 goals.

In the 1898 VFL Grand Final, Moore played against Fitzroy's Stan Reid, who would also die in the Boer War. Moore kicked one goal in Essendon's loss to Fitzroy:

In the Geelong game at East Melbourne (viz., Round 12 on Saturday 29 July 1899), according to "The Argus", all hell broke loose when "Moore, the Essendon forward, marked just outside kicking distance and Thompson (Geelong) was holding him ... Moore struggled and in doing so struck Thompson ... as Moore stood back McShane (Geelong) ran up and deliberately struck him behind the ear.
"Moore swung around to hit his assailant, and in doing so struck the umpire on the mouth."

== Sportsman ==
In addition to his footballing skills, Moore was also an excellent swimmer and a highly talented boxer. In the early days of his sojourn in South Africa, Moore showed off his sporting prowess by winning the Regiment boxing competition and being runner-up in the swimming competition:

Christmas Day 25 December 1900.
We camped and organised a sports day, the chief and ever popular item being a boxing competition — light hitting and sparring for points. Well, all morning they banged away till only three stalwarts remained — Charles Moore being the favourite. After rest and refreshment Sergeant Sanderson came into the ring seeking for a knockout. Tall and strong he made it a rushing bout, but never a blow got home. Moore danced nimbly away watching his chance then hooked the Sergeant, just one to the chin, it proved sufficient. Last man in — short thick set and powerful — he tried much the same tactics as Sanderson, with identical results. He couldn't hit the favourite, who cleverly evaded each attack, waited for an opening, then got one home which knocked the other man right out under the ropes, where he lay wondering just what struck him. Light tapping for points you say. Well the pace may have been a bit merry, but that's how they did it in the army. Poor Charlie Moore, who also aimed at being the regiments crack swimmer, but here he bumped into Frank Felstead — a lighter built man with just the right build for surging through water with little apparent effort, so Corporal Moore had to rest content with second place and he was a bad loser.

== Soldier ==
According to a fellow trooper in South Africa, Moore was "university trained, gifted, and well fitted to lead men and gain respect from his comrades". Following the outbreak of the Anglo-Boer War, Moore enlisted in the Imperial Military Forces in the Fourth Victoria (Colonial) Imperial Bushmen's Contingent. The stated requirement for enlistment was that candidates must be capable horsemen, and have a certain amount of bush experience. According to (Main & Allen, (2002), pp. 3,5), The Official Records of the Military Contingents to the War in South Africa noted that:

At the request of the Imperial Government, which desired that a corps of seasoned bushmen, bold riders, and sharpshooters, should be enrolled, capable of contending with a guerilla enemy, this [Fourth (Imperial)] Contingent was raised.The officers and men were to serve directly under the Imperial Government and be subject entirely to it. The period of service was limited to twelve months or the duration of the war."

At the time of his enlistment, Moore listed his occupation as "chainman", which indicated that his work was with surveying teams in the bush, and, in particular, that he was responsible for the application of the Gunter's chain. At the time, his height was measured at 5 ft 6 1/4 in (168.3 cm), and his chest at 36 inches (91 cm). Corporal Moore left Australia for South Africa on 1 May 1900, with the Fourth (Imperial) Contingent, under the command of Lieutenant-Colonel Kelly,

According to a fellow trooper, soon after Moore arrived in South Africa, he was demoted to Private for getting "too big for his boots", and having "looked upon the wine when it was red" On 12 May 1901, he was part of a reconnaissance squad patrolling in the location of the Toorberg Mountain above the Doornbosch Farm when they came across and engaged a group of Boers. In the ensuing battle, Moore's horse was shot out from underneath him, and he took cover behind the body of the fallen horse. He was then seriously wounded when a Boer bullet hit him in the waist, having passed through the body of the dead horse. Moore eventually killed his Boer opponent after eight shots, and had struggled back to a ridge and was crawling along it on his hands and knees when his mates found him. They took the gravely wounded Moore to the nearby Kwaggashoek Farmhouse. He died of his wounds that night; a contemporary South Melbourne newspaper claimed that Moore "was the first man of the Imperial Contingent to die of gunshot wounds".

He was originally buried near to where he died; his body was later exhumed and he is now buried in the Dutch Reformed Church cemetery, Somerset East, Eastern Cape, South Africa.

== Remembered ==
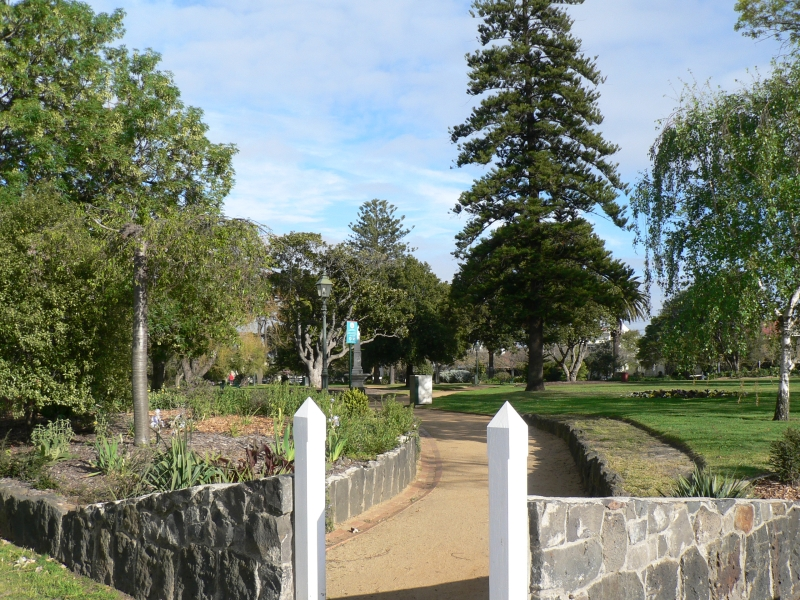
A view of the drinking fountain erected by public subscription as a memorial to Charles Moore at St Vincent Gardens, Albert Park (the fountain is in the centre of the photograph)

Charles Moore is commemorated on war memorials at:

- Charles Moore Memorial drinking fountain, St Vincent Gardens, St Vincent Place, Albert Park, Victoria, erected by public subscription, unveiled on 25 January 1903.
- Boer War Memorial in Ballarat, Victoria.
- Memorial Shrine with drinking fountain and a lamp, at Bank Street South Melbourne; a memorial to the 140 residents of the City of South Melbourne who served in the Boer War in various contingents (includes a separate list of the eight of the 140, including Moore, who had lost their lives in active service).
- Australian War Memorial, Canberra, Australian Capital Territory.
- Albert Park State School.

== See also ==
- List of Victorian Football League players who died on active service
- 1898 VFL Grand Final
