= Joe Grace (Australian footballer) =

Australian rules footballer (1878–1919)

Personal information
- Full name: Joseph Patrick Grace
- Born: 9 October 1878; Richmond, Victoria
- Died: 5 September 1919 (aged 40); Perth, Western Australia

Playing career^{1}
Years	Club	Games (Goals)
1900	Fitzroy	2 (0)
- ^{1} Playing statistics correct to the end of 1900.

Joseph Patrick Grace (9 October 1878 – 5 September 1919) was an Australian rules footballer who played with Fitzroy.

== Family ==
The son of Thomas Grace, and Julia Grace, née O'Callaghan, Joseph Patrick Grace was born in Richmond, Victoria on 9 October 1878. He was the brother of Fitzroy footballers Jim Grace and Mick Grace.

He married Annie Jane Smith (1879-1951) in 1905. She later remarried, becoming Mrs. Joseph McCormick. She died at Manly, New South Wales on 16 April 1951.

== Death ==
Employed as an insurance agent, he died in Perth Hospital on 5 September 1919.
