= 1898 VFL grand final =

Grand final of the 1898 Victorian Football League season

1898 VFL Grand final

Fitzroy	Essendon
5.8 (38)	3.5 (23)
	1	2	3	4
FIT	2.5 (17)	4.5 (29)	5.6 (36)	5.8 (38)
ESS	1.0 (6)	3.1 (19)	3.2 (20)	3.5 (23)
- Date: 24 September 1898
- Stadium: Junction Oval
- Attendance: 16,538
- Umpires: Crapp

Accolades
- Australian Football Hall of Fame: 1. Albert Thurgood (1996)

The 1898 VFL Grand Final was an Australian rules football game contested between the Essendon Football Club and Fitzroy Football Club, held in Melbourne on 24 September 1898. The match was played to determine the premiers for the 1898 VFL season. Fitzroy won the match by 15 points. The game was played under atrocious ground conditions in front of 16,538 people at the Junction Oval.

The match is recognised as the first VFL grand final, although the term "grand final" was not in wide use until 1931. It was the first time that Victorian Football League premiership was decided in a final match, as the 1897 premiership was won under a different finals system by Essendon when they finished above three other clubs on the finals series ladder.

Both Fitzroy back pocket Stan Reid and the Essendon full-forward Charlie Moore later died in South Africa in active service during the Anglo-Boer War—Moore on 5 May 1901, and Reid on 23 June 1901.

== Season ==
During the 1898 home-and-away season, all teams played each other twice. The final end-of season ladder was as follows:

(P)	Premiers
	Section A
	Section B

#	Team	P	W	L	D	PF	PA	%	Pts
1	Essendon	14	11	3	0	756	374	202.1	44
2	Collingwood	14	10	4	0	657	363	181.0	40
3	Fitzroy (P)	14	10	4	0	568	467	121.6	40
4	Geelong	14	9	5	0	645	425	151.8	36
5	South Melbourne	14	7	7	0	482	538	89.6	28
6	Melbourne	14	5	8	1	529	545	97.1	22
7	Carlton	14	3	10	1	382	634	60.3	14
8	St Kilda	14	0	14	0	339	1012	33.5	0

Rules for classification: 1. premiership points; 2. percentage; 3. points for
Average score: 38.9
Source: AFL Tables

Qualified for finals

#	Team	P	W	L	D	PF	PA	%	Pts
1	Fitzroy	3	3	0	0	182	56	325.0	12
2	Essendon	3	2	1	0	132	77	171.4	8
3	South Melbourne	3	1	2	0	104	110	94.5	4
4	Carlton	3	0	3	0	37	212	17.5	0

Rules for classification: 1. premiership points; 2. percentage; 3. points for
Source: AFL Tables

Qualified for finals

#	Team	P	W	L	D	PF	PA	%	Pts
1	Collingwood	3	3	0	0	203	98	207.1	12
2	Geelong	3	2	1	0	210	88	238.6	8
3	Melbourne	3	1	2	0	95	150	63.3	4
4	St Kilda	3	0	3	0	71	243	29.2	0

Rules for classification: 1. premiership points; 2. percentage; 3. points for
Source: AFL Tables

== Lead-up ==
According to the 1898 VFL finals system, the eight teams in the VFL competition were divided into two sections based on their positions on the ladder: the first group were the teams that finished first, third, fifth and seventh and the second group were the teams that finished second, fourth, sixth and eighth.

The teams in the two sections played three rounds of four round-robin matches on three consecutive Saturdays:

- Round One: (1) v (3), (2) v (4), (5) v (7), and (6) v (8).
- Round Two: (1) v (5), (2) v (6), (3) v (7), and (4) v (8).
- Round Three: (1) v (7), (2) v (8), (3) v (5), and (4) v (6).

The winners of the two sections were Fitzroy and Collingwood, respectively (for results of all of the round-robin matches); and, a week later (17 September 1898), the two teams played each other at Brunswick Street Oval, with Fitzroy winning the match 2.10 (22) to 1.5 (11).

The 1898 rules stipulated that, if the team at the top of the ladder at the end of the home-and-away season (the "minor premiers") had not won the "sectional final" match between the two sectional winners, the "minor premier" had the right to "challenge" the winner and, having done so, the winner of that grand finale match was declared the season's premiership team.

== Venue selection ==
The VFL had not anticipated a challenge final in the match fixtures before the home-and-away season began, nor had it made any sort of a tentative venue booking to provide for such a possible eventuality—this was a significant omission given that each of the grounds were to be top-dressed and otherwise "cultivated" in preparation for the oncoming cricket season immediately after the scheduled football season was over.

Although Essendon and Fitzroy could not agree on the choice of a single venue, they suggested three mutually acceptable venues for the match:

- The East Melbourne Cricket Ground, the home ground of minor premiers Essendon.
- The Brunswick Street Oval, the home ground of Fitzroy.
- The neutral Lake Oval on the verge of Albert Park Lake, close to the city and well served by rail and a number of tram routes.

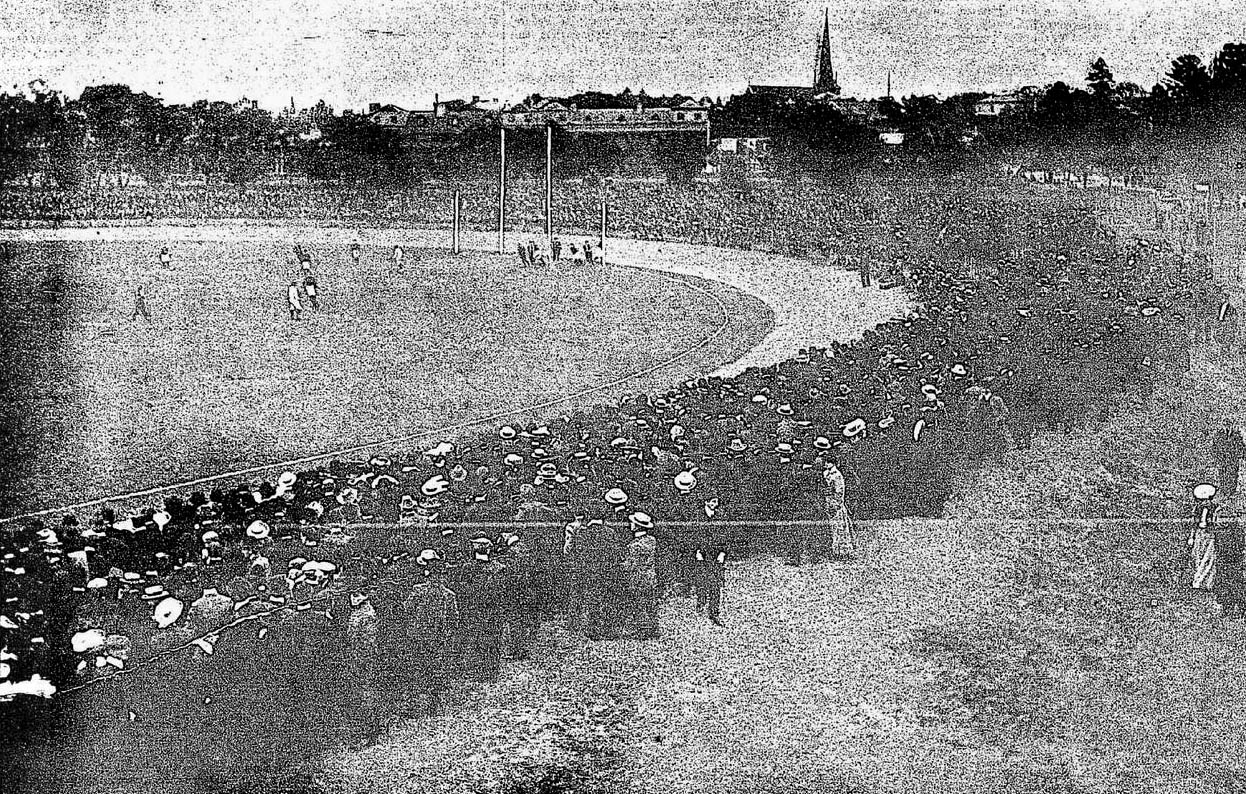
The Junction Oval, venue for the match

After the VFL referred the decision to the VFL's Match Arrangement Committee, they, upon the express instructions of that committee, rejected the suggestions of the two teams outright and the match was controversially scheduled to be played at the Junction Oval.

The Junction Oval was in an appalling condition, as the ground had not been used since the second Saturday of the sectional round-robin match three weeks earlier (3 September); and, since then, it had been thoroughly top-dressed and "cultivated" in anticipation of the coming cricket season. Also, the cricket ground's asphalt cycling track that lay between the boundary line and the fence presented a considerable danger to the footballers.

Despite being the "challenger", Essendon flatly refused to play in the scheduled match, declaring that it would rather forfeit the match and the premiership than play on such a dangerous surface. This view was also strongly supported by Fitzroy, whose captain, Alec Sloan, had also taken the step of signing a statutory declaration to the effect that, in his opinion, the ground was entirely unfit to play on.

Essendon immediately lodged an appeal with the VFL against the match arrangement committee's decision, partly on the basis of the condition of the ground and partly because the committee, asked to decide on one of three mutually acceptable venues, had chosen a fourth that was acceptable to neither participant.

The VFL, perhaps somewhat driven by the fact that the attraction of a finals system was one of the major reasons that the eight teams had left the VFA and formed the VFL in the first place, had a special meeting to hear Essendon's appeal. While it chose to endorse the committee's decision, it also did everything it could to convince Essendon to play the match.

Essendon did not actually agree to play the match until the night before the game; ultimately, this "in-doubt-until-the-last-minute match" was still attended by 16,538 paying spectators; it certainly would have been a much larger crowd otherwise.

The ground had been in such a dreadful condition that, in the week prior to the match, over 40 dray-loads of rubbish, soil and street-sweepings had been taken from the ground. All of this last-minute work greatly improved the playing surface at the ground, with sportswriters noting that while the ground was imperfect, it was nevertheless fit for use. Dry, windy weather and patches of ground where the topsoil had not bound meant that players often fell on the grassless slippery ground for want of some sort of grip, and play was often impeded by clouds of dust.

To prevent any repeat of the events leading up to the 1898 challenge final, the VFL agreed that from 1899 they would schedule for a possible challenge final in advance.

== Teams ==
In 1898, all VFL teams had 20 on-the-field players and no "reserves". Although there were no reserves, any player who had left the playing field for any reason at all could resume his place on the field at any time. Fitzroy selected a set of brothers in its team, Jim and Mick Grace.

The Fitzroy and the Essendon teams were as follows:

Fitzroy	Essendon

Fitzroy
B:	Stan Reid	Johnny Power	Jerry Nolan
HB:	Alec Sloan (c)	Pat Hickey	John G. Dalton
C:	Eddie Drohan	Harry Clarke	Kelly Robinson
HF:	Chris Kiernan	Bert Sharpe	Bill Dalton
F:	Fred Fontaine	Jim Grace	Alf McDougall
Foll:	Mick Grace	Bill McSpeerin	Bill Potter
Foll:	Pat Descrimes	Paddy Noonan	
Coach:	None		

Essendon
B:	Ted Kinnear	Ned Officer	Hugh Gavin
HB:	George Stuckey (c)	Jim Anderson	George Vautin
C:	Joe Groves	Harry Wright	Alf Gray
HF:	Tod Collins	Colin Campbell	George Hastings
F:	Conrad ten Brink	Charlie Moore	Gus Kearney
Foll:	Charlie Forbes	Arthur Cleghorn	Pat O'Loughlin
Foll:	Bill Jackson	Son Barry	
Coach:	None		

- Umpire – Ivo Crapp

== Match ==
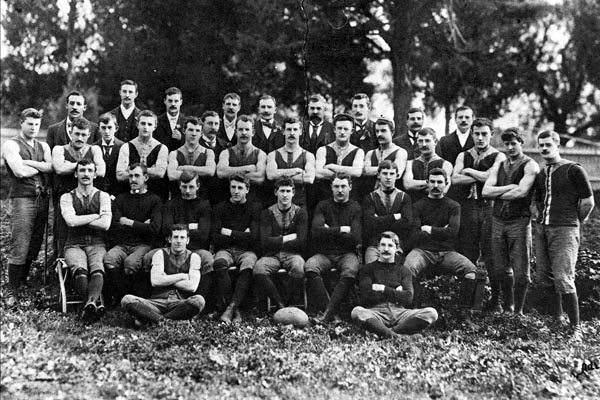
Fitzroy, winning team.

Essendon had beaten Fitzroy in their round 1 and round 8 matches by 53 and 43 points, respectively. Fitzroy had beaten Essendon by 29 points in the third match of their round-robin Sectional matches.

Both teams had great difficulty playing football in the appalling ground conditions—as evidenced by the low scores—and the tough, bustling Fitzroy team handled the conditions far better than the Essendon team that had hoped to spread the game out as far as possible. Fitzroy took the lead in the first few minutes of the match, and Essendon were never able to catch up.

Essendon were further demoralized when Fitzroy champion forward and follower Mick Grace, renowned for his marking skill and kicking prowess, flew high over a pack to take a spectacular high mark and kicked a long-range goal.

In a very tight, defensive second half, as the playing conditions deteriorated even further, only one goal was scored. Fitzroy went on to beat Essendon 5.8 (38) to 3.5 (23).

=== Scoreboard ===
Grand Final
Saturday, 24 September (2:50 pm)	Fitzroy	def.	Essendon	Junction Oval (crowd: 16,538)	Report
2.5 (17); 4.5 (29); 5.6 (36); 5.8 (38)	Q1; Q2; Q3; Final	1.0 (6); 3.1 (19); 3.2 (20); 3.5 (23)	Umpires: Crapp
J. Grace 2, M. Grace, McDougall, McSpeerin	Goals	Collins 2, Moore
M. Grace, Reid, Drohan, Hickey, Potter, Sloan, Descrimes, McSpeerin, J. Grace	Best	Forbes, Stuckey, Jackson, Cleghorn, Hastings, Gavin, Officer, Kearney
Fitzroy won the first VFL Grand Final (there was no "grand final" in 1897), and its first premiership, by 15 points against minor premiers Essendon.; Fitzroy led by 10 points at half-time before keeping Essendon to one goal in the second half.

== See also ==
- 1898 VFL season

== Sources ==
- Grand Final Umpires: VFL/AFL 1897–2016, AFL Umpires Association 2016 Yearbook, AFL Umpires Association, (Docklands), 2016, pp.52–53.
- Main, J. & Allen, D., Fallen — The Ultimate Heroes: Footballers Who Never Returned From War, Crown Content, (Melbourne), 2002. ISBN 1-74095-010-0
- Maplestone, M., Flying Higher: History of the Essendon Football Club 1872–1996, Essendon Football Club, (Melbourne), 1996. ISBN 0-9591740-2-8
- Rogers, S. & Brown, A., Every Game Ever Played: VFL/AFL Results 1897–1997 (Sixth Edition), Viking Books, (Ringwood), 1998. ISBN 0-670-90809-6
- Ross, J. (ed), 100 Years of Australian Football 1897–1996: The Complete Story of the AFL, All the Big Stories, All the Great Pictures, All the Champions, Every AFL Season Reported, Viking, (Ringwood), 1996. ISBN 0-670-86814-0
