= Abe McDougall =

Australian rules footballer

Personal information
- Full name: Albert Henry McDougall
- Born: 30 November 1876; Auckland, New Zealand
- Died: 9 March 1948 (aged 71); Caulfield, Victoria
- Original team: St Mary's
- Position: Forward

Playing career^{1}
Years	Club	Games (Goals)
1898–1902	Fitzroy	59 (28)
- ^{1} Playing statistics correct to the end of 1902.

Career highlights
- 2× VFL premiership player: 1898, 1899

Albert Henry "Abe" McDougall (30 November 1876 – 9 March 1948) was an Australian rules footballer who played for the Fitzroy Football Club in the Victorian Football League (VFL).

McDougall commenced his football career with St Mary's in the Metropolitan Junior Football League in 1895 and made some appearances for North Melbourne in the Victorian Football Association before being cleared to Fitzroy in 1898.

McDougall was the match winner in his debut VFL game against Carlton, kicking two goals in a low-scoring affair. He played as a forward pocket in the Fitzroy premiership teams of 1898 and 1899. In 1900 he appeared in his third successive grand final, as a centre half-forward, but finished on the losing side.

A coppersmith by trade, McDougall later served in World War I as a mechanic for the 1st Australian Flying Corps.

McDougall's son, Roy McDougall, also played for Fitzroy.
