= St Vincent Gardens =

Small park in Melbourne, Victoria, Australia

St Vincent Garden
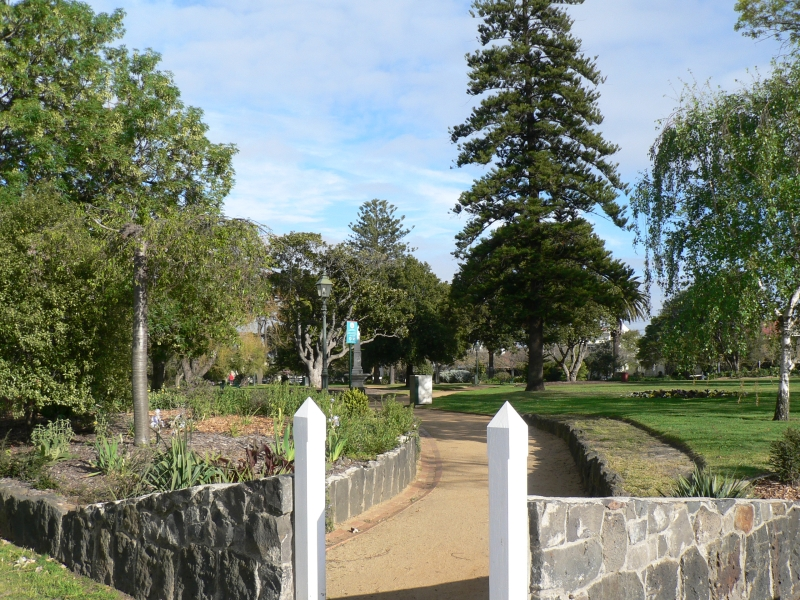
- The Victorian-era garden square, 2006

- Location within Melbourne
- Interactive map of St Vincent Garden
- Type: Garden square
- Location: Albert Park, Melbourne, Victoria
- Coordinates: 37°50′20″S 144°57′20″E
- Area: 3.41 ha (8.4 acres)
- Established: 1868; 158 years ago
- Designer: Andrew Clarke (attrib.); Clement Hodgkinson
- Etymology: John Jervis, 1st Earl of St Vincent (attrib.)
- Operator: City of Port Phillip
- Open: All year
- Status: Open
- Public transit: –, – 606
- Facilities: Playgrounds; bowling green; tennis courts; toilets; drinking fountain
- Website: portphillip.vic.gov.au

St Vincent Gardens is a 3.4-hectare (8.4-acre) garden square set in a Victorian Georgian residential development located in Albert Park, an inner-city suburb of Melbourne, Victoria, Australia. Envisaged in the 1850s, the park and dwellings were designed by Clement Hodgkinson in the 1860s. The park and surrounding streets are located within the City of Port Phillip.

The garden square is a focal point of a landscaped square surrounded by a series of nineteenth century residential dwellings. Development occurred as a result of a boom following the Victorian gold rush. It was influenced by similar garden square designs in London that were unparalleled in Australia.

The St Vincent Place residential precinct, inclusive of the Gardens, was added to the Victorian Heritage Register on 9 January 1997 for its "aesthetic, historical, architectural and social significance". (Note: The Victorian Heritage Register lists: "… comprising all the land, gardens, buildings and works… in the places known as St Vincent Gardens East, St Vincent Gardens West, Numbers 2-94 St Vincent Place North, Numbers 1-99 St Vincent Place South, 10 Merton Street, the Albert Park Bowling Club, the Albert Park Tennis Club, the roadway and footpath of St Vincent Place, and the roadway and footpath of Montague Street between the property lines of St Vincent Place North and St Vincent Place South.") The precinct is also included on the Victorian branch of the National Trust non-statutory register, and, in 1980, was added to the now defunct Register of the National Estate. A separate area, adjoining the Gardens, known as St Vincent Place East, was nominated in 2020 for inclusion on the Victorian Heritage Register.

== Description ==
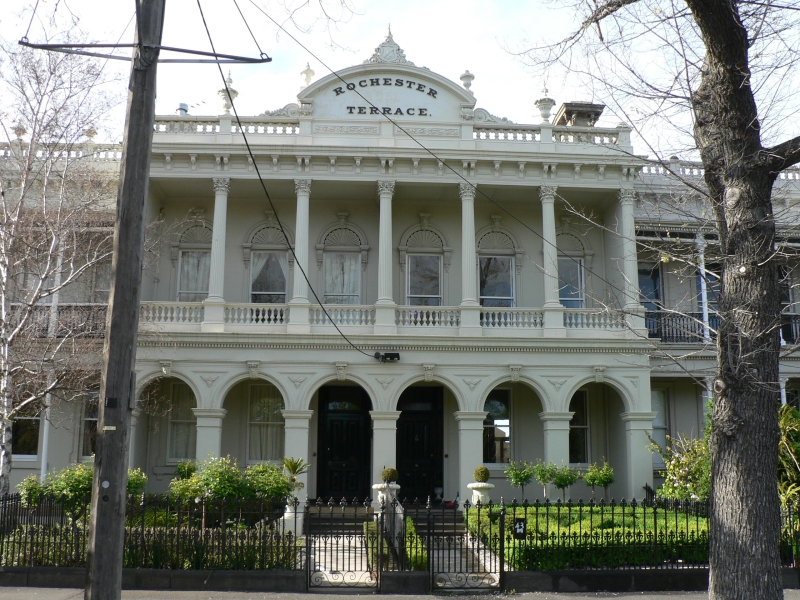
One of the houses surrounding the garden square

The park is the shape of a large rectangle. Semi-circular crescents at either end of the park surround the park and are included in the heritage area, bounded by Park, Cecil, and Bridport streets, Cardigan Place, and Nelson Road. The park is bisected by Montague Street, allowing the passage of trams on route 1. Several of the streets are lined with the original cobbled blue stone and gutters.

The Gardens are particularly important including their layout and collections of mature trees, and the relationship of the gardens with the adjacent residential buildings. According to the heritage listing, the Gardens are "… a reflection of the aspirations of middle class residents… [and] are also socially important as a focus of community life for the surrounding district with the maintenance of their amenity a priority of municipal government since their inception. The existence of the tennis and bowls clubs in the gardens for over a century is a further manifestation of this social importance."

Plantings include lines of Algerian oak (Quercus canariensis) and Canary Island palms (Phoenix canariensis), and individual specimens of brush cherry, coral tree, lilly pilly, Moreton Bay fig, Norfolk Island pine, peony, the southern magnolia (Magnolia grandiflora), and white willow. Lonicera plants from Cruden Farm donated by Dame Elisabeth Murdoch form a hedge around the gardens.

In addition to facilities for the respective bowls and tennis clubs, other structures include a Returned Services League building, built as a memorial between 1923 and 1925; a memorial rest house constructed in 1916 to the north of the bowling green; red brick toilet blocks built in 1910 on the eastern side of the garden; and children's playgrounds.

=== Monuments and memorials ===
The Charles Moore Memorial Drinking Fountain commemorates Charlie Moore, a Boer War soldier and Essendon Football Club full forward. Moore was killed in action in the Orange Free State (later, South Africa), and at the time, his mother and sister lived in St Vincent Place. The memorial was funded by public donations and unveiled on 25 January 1903.

The Alexander Rose Garden commemorates the contribution of Harold Alexander, a former player for the South Melbourne Football Club, who later served as Clerk of the City of South Melbourne from 1936 to 1964, and fostered municipal welfare services with the support of Mayor, Doris Condon. Under his administration, Australia's first "community chest" for social welfare was set up. After the war, be bought Nissen huts to provide hot meals to returned servicemen. They were the forerunners of today's senior citizens clubs. Alexander appointed the council's first social worker and oversaw Australia's first meals on wheels service in 1953. He helped set up "Claremont" aged care hostel. From 1927 he also fought to have Wirth's Circus site on Southbank reserved for the state's art gallery and cultural centre.

There is a monumental garden dedicated to the Australian entertainers Maurie Fields and his wife Val Jellay, former residents of the area, most likely installed following Jelley's death in 2017.

== History ==
Bowling in the gardens, 1878. Rochester Terrace is in the background.

The first designs of the Gardens and associated precinct in 1854 or 1855 were attributed to Andrew Clarke, (Note: An officer in the Corps of Royal Engineers of the British Army, Clarke later served in both the Victorian Legislative Council and the Victorian Legislative Assembly, and was knighted as Lieutenant-General Sir Andrew Clarke GCMG CB CIE.) a Surveyor-General of Victoria. Clement Hodgkinson adapted the design in 1857 to allow for its intersection by the St Kilda railway line. Development of the Gardens occurred between 1864 and 1870 with plans by Hodgkinson in 1869 showing an overall plan of the reserve, including the older tree plantings, the path system at the western end, and the circular theme of the paths design at the eastern end.

The South Melbourne Bowling Club, later to become the Albert Park Bowls Club, was established in the park on 6 December 1873 with a notice published in The Age that read:

We have been requested to call attention to the fact that the South Melbourne Bowling Club will open their new green in the Public Gardens, St. Vincent’s-place, Emerald-hill, this afternoon, at three p.m. The club is open to every resident of the hill.

The South Melbourne Lawn Tennis Club, later to become the Albert Park Lawn Tennis Club, was established in the park in 1884 and has two clay courts.

The gardens were rejuvenated during 1903–1910 with much of the original landscaping being retained.

In 2004, a Canary Island palm was removed suffering from fusarium wilt otherwise known as Panama disease. In 2005 six significant trees were lost after a wild storm.

== Etymology ==
All the streets in the St Vincent Place precinct have nautical themes. It is most likely that St Vincent Gardens was named in honour of John Jervis, 1st Earl of St Vincent, a Royal Navy admiral, who was First Lord of the Admiralty between 1801 and 1804.
