= Bill Dalton (footballer) =

Australian rules footballer (1876–1955)

Personal information
- Full name: William Joseph Dalton
- Born: 11 March 1876; Melbourne
- Died: 14 December 1955 (aged 79); Brunswick, Victoria
- Original team: Albert Park Juniors

Playing career^{1}
Years	Club	Games (Goals)
1898–1902	Fitzroy	57 (9)
- ^{1} Playing statistics correct to the end of 1902.

Career highlights
- 2× VFL premiership player: 1898, 1899

William Joseph Dalton (11 March 1876 – 14 December 1955) was an Australian rules footballer who played for the Fitzroy Football Club in the Victorian Football League (VFL).

== Family ==
The son of William Dalton (1845–1914), and Anna Dalton (1853–1925), née Brophy, William Joseph Dalton was born in Melbourne on 11 March 1876.

He married Ellen Theresa "Nellie" Tipping (1875–1919) in 1905.

== Football ==
A dual premiership player, Dalton played on the half-forward flank in Fitzroy's 1898 premiership team and its 1899 premiership team.

== Death ==
He died at his Brunswick, Victoria residence on 14 December 1955.
