= Pat Descrimes =

Australian rules footballer

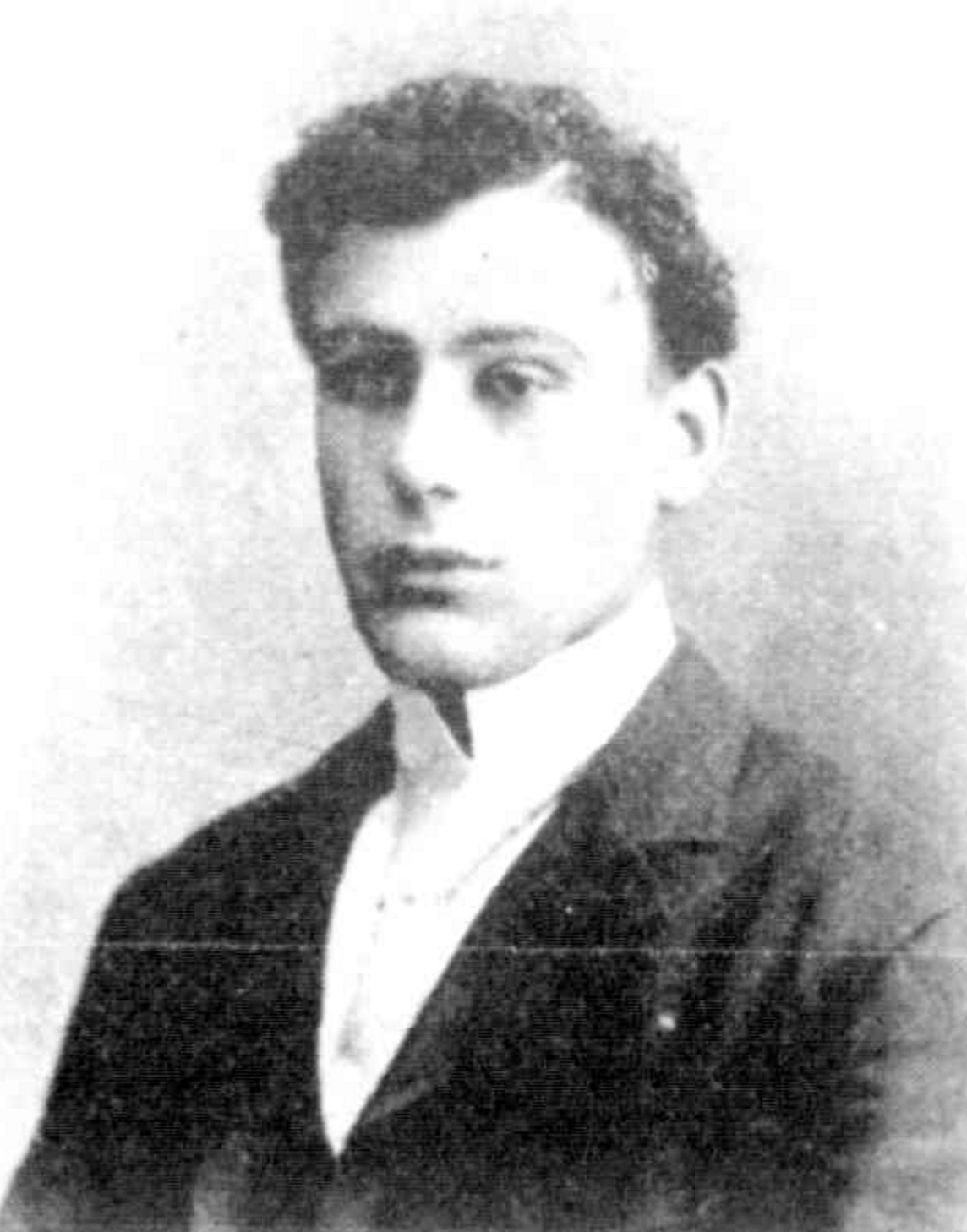
- Descrimes in 1899

Personal information
- Full name: Patrick Joseph Descrimes
- Born: 31 December 1877; Geelong, Victoria
- Died: 5 January 1939 (aged 61); Dromana, Victoria
- Original team: North Carlton
- Position: Follower

Playing career^{1}
Years	Club	Games (Goals)
1897–1900	Fitzroy	55 (18)
- ^{1} Playing statistics correct to the end of 1900.

Career highlights
- 2× VFL premiership player: 1898, 1899

Patrick Joseph "Pat" Descrimes (31 December 1877 – 5 January 1939) was an Australian rules footballer who played for the Fitzroy Football Club in the Victorian Football League (VFL).

Descrimes debuted at Fitzroy in opening game of the inaugural VFL season in 1897 and went on to play four seasons for the club. He was a follower in Fitzroy's 1898 premiership team and a half forward flanker in their premiership side in 1899.
