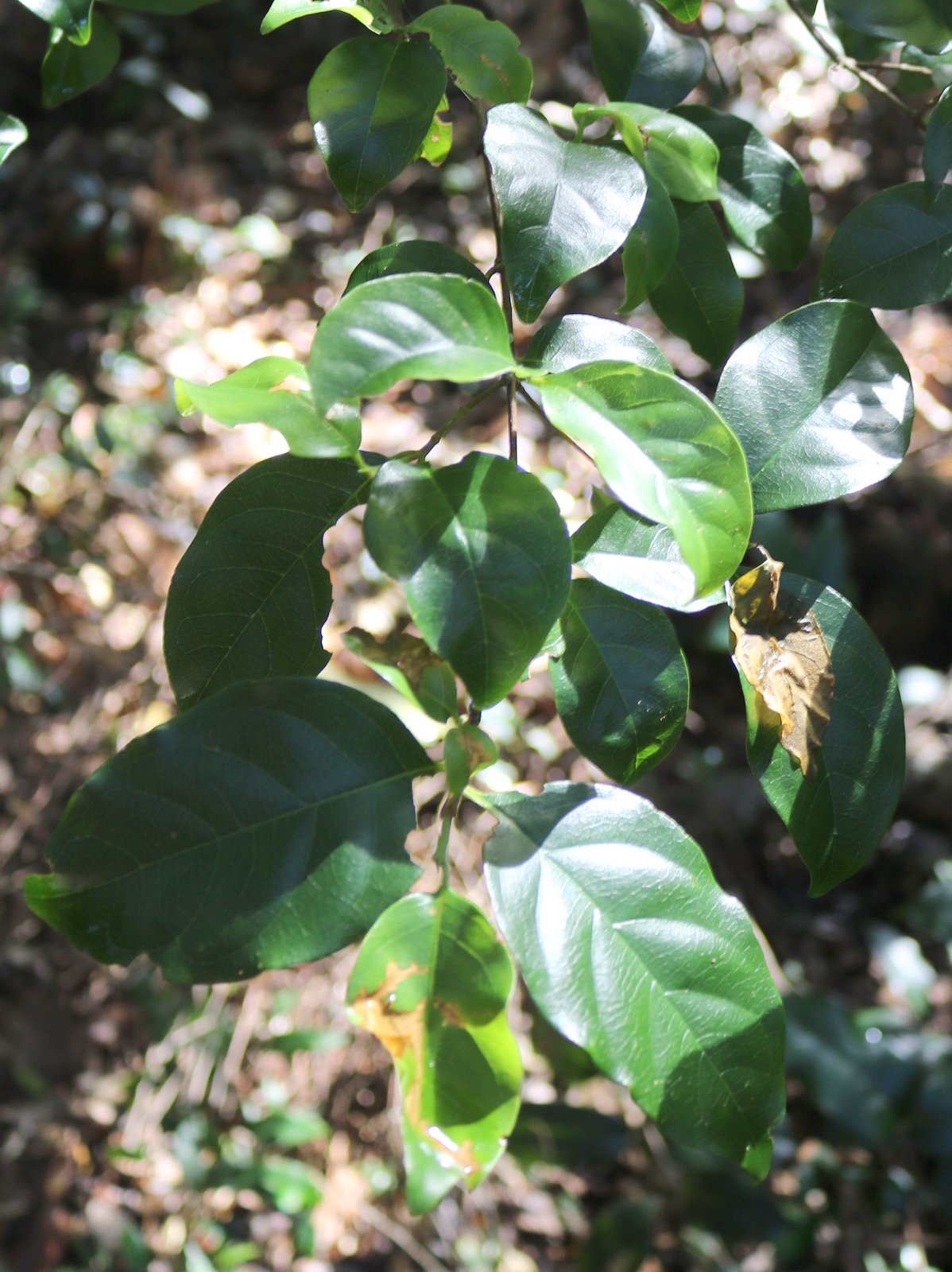
- Hodgkinsonia ovatiflora

Scientific classification
- Kingdom: Plantae
- Clade: Tracheophytes
- Clade: Angiosperms
- Clade: Eudicots
- Clade: Asterids
- Order: Gentianales
- Family: Rubiaceae
- Genus: Hodgkinsonia; F.Muell.

= Hodgkinsonia =

Genus of plants

Hodgkinsonia is a monotypic genus of flowering plants belonging to the family Rubiaceae. It only contains one species, Hodgkinsonia ovatiflora F.Muell.

Its native range is eastern Australia, in the territories of New South Wales and Queensland.

The genus name of Hodgkinsonia is in honour of Clement Hodgkinson (1818–1893), an English naturalist, explorer and surveyor of Australia. The Latin specific epithet of ovatiflora is derived from ovatus L meaning egg-shaped and flora meaning flower. Both genus and species were first described and published in Fragm. (Fragmenta Phytographiae Australiae) Vol.2 on page 132 in 1861.
