= Harold Alexander (footballer) =

Australian rules footballer, born 1902

Harry Alexander

Personal information
- Full name: Harold Francis Alexander
- Born: 21 April 1902; Albert Park, Victoria
- Died: 17 August 1964 (aged 62)
- Original team: Leopold
- Height: 188 cm (6 ft 2 in)
- Weight: 79 kg (174 lb)
- Position: Follower

Playing career^{1}
| Years | Club | Games (Goals) |
| 1922–26 | South Melbourne | 70 (40) |
- ^{1} Playing statistics correct to the end of 1926.

Harold Francis Alexander (21 April 1902 – 17 August 1964) was an Australian rules footballer who played with South Melbourne in the Victorian Football League (VFL).

== Public service career ==
Alexander later served as Clerk of the City of South Melbourne from 1936 to 1964 and fostered municipal welfare services with the support of Mayor, Doris Condon AM. Under his administration, Australia's first 'community chest' for social welfare was set up. After World War II, he bought Nissen huts to provide hot meals to returned servicemen. They were the forerunners of today's senior citizens clubs. Alexander appointed the council's first social worker and oversaw Australia's first meals on wheels service in 1953. He helped set up 'Claremont' aged care hostel. From 1927 he also fought to have Wirth's Circus site on Southbank reserved for the state's art gallery and cultural centre.

== Legacy ==
In St Vincent Gardens, Albert Park, a diamond-shaped rose garden was dedicated in his honour; and in 2017, an area front of the Emerald Hill Library was named the Harold Alexander Forecourt.
