= St Vincent Place =

Heritage precinct in Melbourne, Victoria, Australia

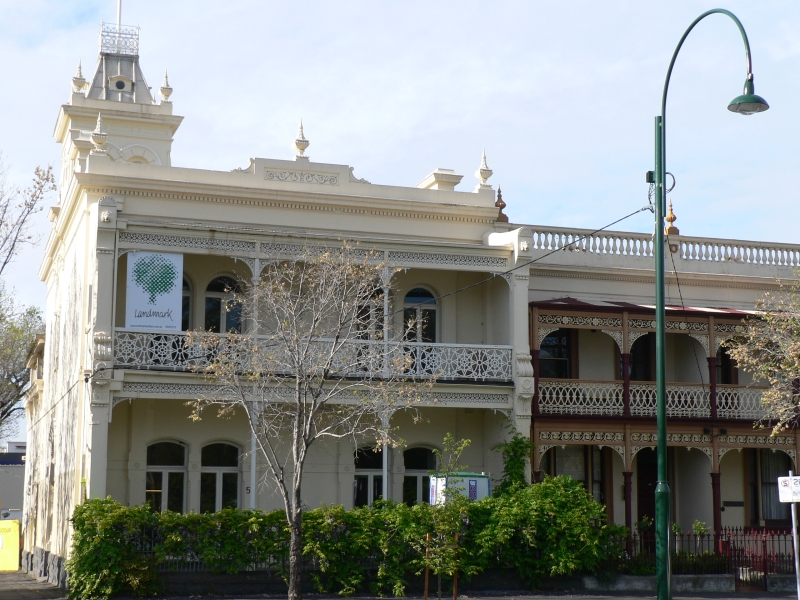
- Terrace house in the Victorian Regency style

- Location of the heritage site in Melbourne
- Interactive map of St Vincent Place
- 37°50′21″S 144°57′18″E
- Type: Residential urban development
- Location: Albert Park, Victoria
- Nearest city: Melbourne

History
- Built: 1868; 158 years ago

Site notes
- Architect(s): Clement Hodgkinson (urban designer)
- Architectural style: Victorian Regency

Victorian Heritage Register
- Official name: St Vincent Place Precinct
- Type: Registered place
- Designated: 9 January 1997
- Reference no.: H1291
- Heritage overlay no.: HO258
- Category: Urban Area

Register of the National Estate
- Official name: St Vincent Place Conservation Area
- Type: Defunct register
- Criteria: Historic
- Designated: 21 October 1980
- Reference no.: 5460

St Vincent Place is a heritage precinct in Albert Park, an inner-city suburb of Melbourne, in Victoria, Australia. Characterised by Victorian Regency–style terrace houses surrounding St Vincent Gardens—a landscaped garden square—the precinct is a rare Australian example of late nineteenth–century residential development, modelled on similar residential garden squares in London and other parts of England.

The St Vincent Place heritage precinct is bounded by Park, Cecil, and Bridport streets, Cardigan Place, and Nelson Road; and is bisected by Montague Street, allowing the passage of trams on route 1.

The precinct, inclusive of St Vincent Gardens and St Vincent Place West, was added to the Victorian Heritage Register on 9 January 1997 due to its "… aesthetic, historical, architectural and social significance…" (Note: The Victorian Heritage Register lists: "… comprising all the land, gardens, buildings and works… in the places known as St Vincent Gardens East, St Vincent Gardens West, Numbers 2-94 St Vincent Place North, Numbers 1-99 St Vincent Place South, 10 Merton Street, the Albert Park Bowling Club, the Albert Park Tennis Club, the roadway and footpath of St Vincent Place, and the roadway and footpath of Montague Street between the property lines of St Vincent Place North and St Vincent Place South.") The precinct is also included on the Victorian branch of the National Trust non-statutory register, and, in 1980, was added to the now defunct Register of the National Estate. A separate area, known as St Vincent Place East, was nominated in 2020 for inclusion on the Victorian Heritage Register.

== Description ==
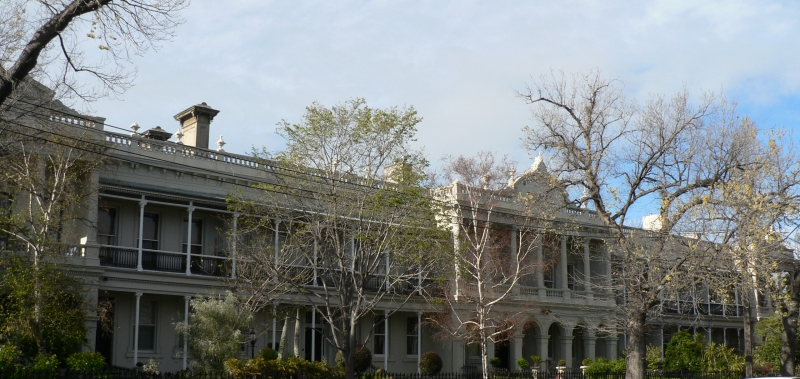
Rochester Terrace

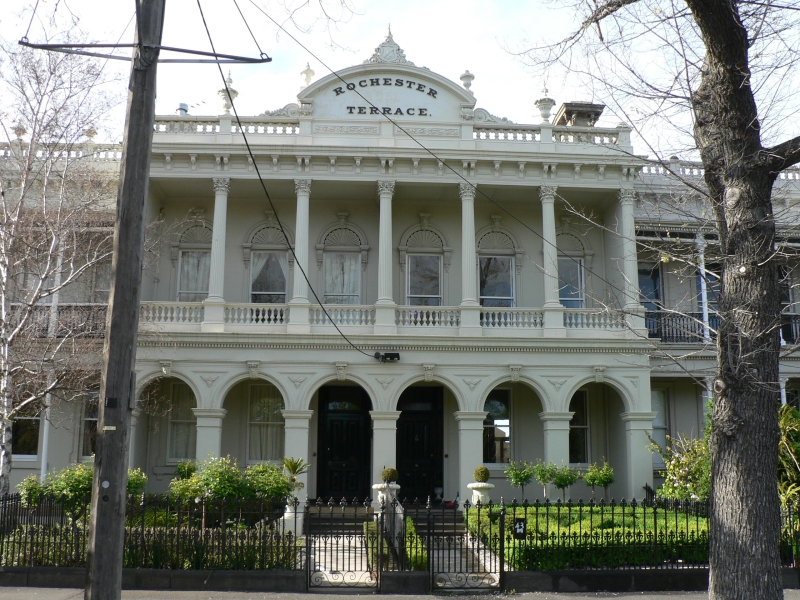
Detail of the main pavilion, Rochester Terrace

The site of a former race track for horses, in 1854 or 1855 Andrew Clarke, (Note: An officer in the Corps of Royal Engineers of the British Army, Clarke later served in both the Victorian Legislative Council and the Victorian Legislative Assembly, and was knighted as Lieutenant-General Sir Andrew Clarke GCMG CB CIE.) a Surveyor-General of Victoria, was attributed with design of the initial plans for St Vincent Place. The original configuration, an emulation of similar 'garden square' developments in London, Bath, and Bristol, extended from Park Street in the north to Bridport Street in the south, and from Howe Crescent in the east to Nelson Road and Cardigan Street in the west.

However, plans for the former St Kilda railway line (1857–1987) interrupted this plan. Clement Hodgkinson adapted the design, effectively creating an 'east' and 'west' portion of St Vincent Place. The first land sales commenced in 1864 and, as housing developed over the next ten years or more, included both quality terrace row dwellings and detached houses.

The most significant building is Rochester Terrace, located at 33-51 St Vincent Place. This row of ten ornate brick terraces was erected in two stages, completed in 1869 and 1879, as an investment for William Parton Buckhurst, a local auctioneer and property developer. (Note: Buckhurst was born in Rochester, England.) Designed by Charles Boykett (d.1876) and his son, Charles Bolten Boykett (d.1877), in the Victorian Regency style, the terrace has a dominant central block, flanking intermediate wings, and detailed Palladian-style pavilions. The terrace is reminiscent of the London terraces of the nineteenth century and faces onto St Vincent Place Gardens.

In 2006 Bernard Salt, an Australian demographer, included the precinct as first among his favourite places that have been designed by planners:

"St Vincent Place, Albert Park: …this residential precinct known only to Melburnians must be one of this nation's town planning treasures. Here are two extended but connecting crescents laid out around gardens which are overlooked by double-storey Victorian terrace houses. Designed in the early 1850s, St Vincent Place was virtually a gated community: the well-to-do would promenade around their public gardens; smaller wooden houses for servants and the working classes were relegated to the lesser enveloping crescents."

== Historical significance ==
The precinct is believed to be the premier garden square development in Victoria that was based on similar models in London. It is the largest development of its type in Victoria and the St Vincent Gardens is much larger than the small parks in the Argyle, Lincoln, Macarthur, and Murchison squares in Carlton. In addition to its importance in terms of its designers and the quality of housing, the precinct is socially important as a reflection of the aspirations of middle class residents in South Melbourne and as a focus of community life for the surrounding district including both the bowls and tennis clubs, located in the St Vincent Gardens, in continual operation since 1873 and 1884 respectively.

In the late 1960s and early 1970s, there was pressure to demolish some of dwellings in the precinct to make way for the proposed F14 East Southeastern Freeway, part of the 1969 Melbourne Transportation Plan. Barbara Niven, a founder of the Emerald Hill Association, successfully fought to protect the area's 19th-century heritage from demolition. The campaign was launched with a pamphlet, authorised by Reg Macey, a South Melbourne politician, showing a map of the alternative routes.

== Etymology ==
All the streets in the St Vincent Place precinct have nautical themes. It is most likely that St Vincent Place was named in honour of John Jervis, 1st Earl of St Vincent, a Royal Navy admiral, who was First Lord of the Admiralty between 1801 and 1804.

== In popular culture ==
St Vincent Place is sometimes dubbed as "millionaire's row", and was home to notable residents, including models, business people, lawyers, doctors and architects.

Several households in St Vincent Place lost families members during World War I including Major Frederick Miller Johnson of number 32; Staff Sergeant John Alfred Eric Crawford, the son of Mrs. S.M. Cowen, of number 82; and Private Harold Frederick Robinson, the husband of Ada May Robinson of number 5.

The Gilded Cage (2002), the first novel of a Melbourne historical trilogy by Marshall Browne, narrates a love story with a backdrop of "graceful St Vincent Place".
