= Alma Park, St Kilda East =

Park in St Kilda East, Victoria, Australia

Coordinates: 37°51′36″S 144°59′40″E

Alma Park is a park in St Kilda East, Victoria, Australia, in the local government area of the city of Port Phillip.

== Location ==
It is bounded by private properties to the east and west, Dandenong Road to the north, and Alma Road to the south. Alma Park is the main park for residents of St Kilda East and Windsor.

It includes a hexagonal rotunda described as "a rare Victorian example of an early twentieth century park rotunda" and the former Keepers Lodge, which are both registered on the Register of the National Estate.

The park was originally designed by Clement Hodgkinson, and includes two children's playgrounds, a cricket and football (soccer) oval and large stands of elm trees, Moreton Bay figs, bike paths and native vegetation areas.

== Railway line ==
In 1859, the construction of the then Brighton railway line from St Kilda severed the park into two. The line was sunken through the park to facilitate grade separations at Chapel Street, Dandenong Road, and Alma Road.

The train line now forms part of the Sandringham line from Flinders Street. Its sunken grade now also provides for uninterrupted view of amenities across the park.

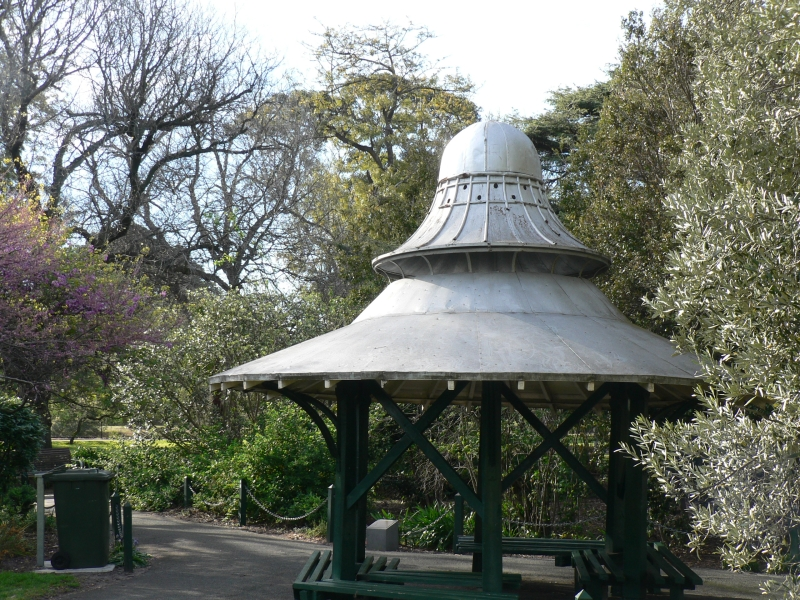
Hexagonal rotunda in Alma Park, probably built between 1910 and 1915
