= Stan Reid =

Australian rules footballer and soldier (1872–1901)

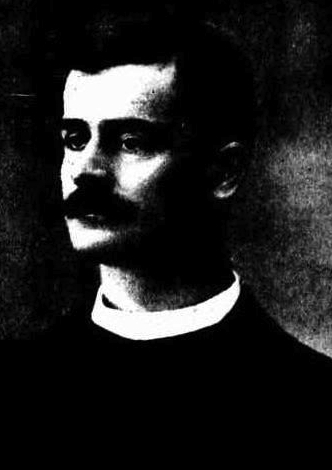

Personal information
- Full name: Stanley Spencer Reid
- Born: 12 July 1872; Swan Hill, Victoria
- Died: 29 June 1901 (aged 28); Middel-Kraal, South Africa
- Original team: Fitzroy (VFA)
- Debut: Round 4, 1897, Fitzroy vs. Essendon, at Brunswick Street Oval

Playing career^{1}
Years	Club	Games (Goals)
1897–1898	Fitzroy	24 (8)
- ^{1} Playing statistics correct to the end of 1898.

Career highlights
- VFL premiership player: 1898

Stanley Spencer Reid (12 July 1872 – 29 June 1901) was an Australian rules footballer with the Fitzroy Football Club from 1894 to 1898.

Soon after his retirement from VFL football, he became an ordained minister of the Presbyterian Church.

He also, later, became a member of the Imperial Forces in the Anglo-Boer War, firstly as a trooper in the Second Western Australian (Mounted Infantry) Contingent (2WAMI) in 1900, and then as a commissioned officer in the Sixth Western Australian (Mounted Infantry) Contingent (6WAMI) in 1901.

He died in active service in the Anglo-Boer War.

== Early life ==
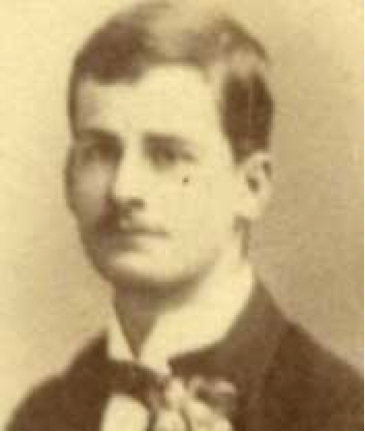
Reid at Scotch College, c.1890

Stanley Spencer Reid was the third child of Rev. John Bentley Reid (1843–1910) and Sibyl Rose Reid, née Drury (1849–1943). He was born in Swan Hill, Victoria on 12 July 1872, and was one of their five sons and two daughters.

The Reids had arrived in Australia in 1871 on the Hampshire, and moved straight to Swan Hill, Victoria where Rev. John Reid became its first Presbyterian minister. He was ordained as soon as Swan Hill's first Presbyterian Church, The John Knox Church, was completed in December 1872.

After spending some time in Victoria Rev. John Bentley Reid moved to Western Australia. He was the joint minister of both the Leederville and the Subiaco Presbyterian churches in 1899. He died on 10 August 1910, in Victoria, aged 68.

== Education ==
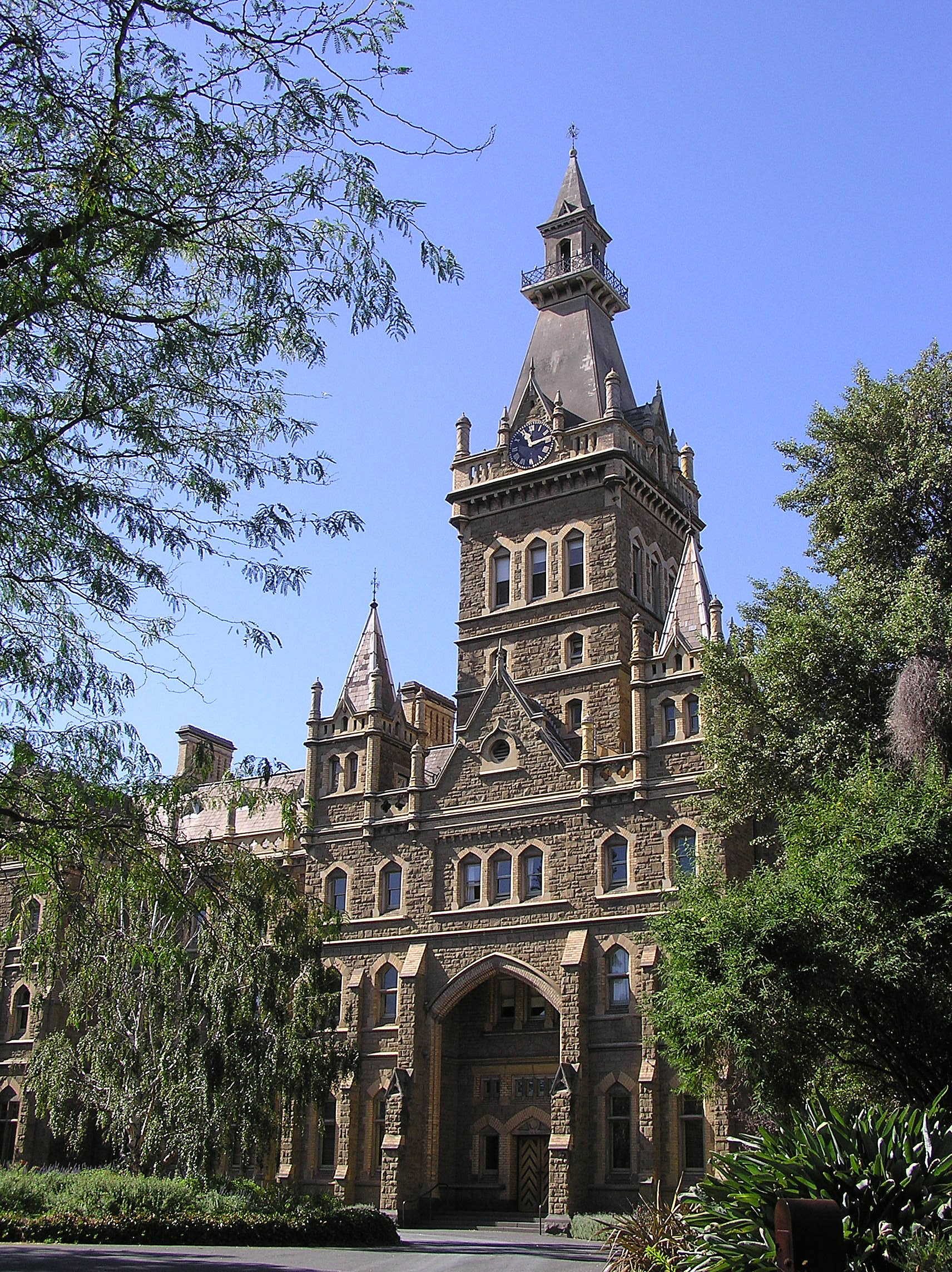
Ormond College, University of Melbourne

He attended Caulfield Grammar School, Scotch College, and the University of Melbourne, where he was a resident of Ormond College.

He graduated from Melbourne University with a Bachelor of Arts in 1896.

=== School sports ===
As well as playing football whilst he was at Scotch College – he played for the Scotch College First XVIII in both 1889 and 1890 – he also played cricket. In a match against Wesley College in 1888, he took 7 wickets for 16 runs in the first innings.

He also competed in, and came second in the open age pole vault and the running high jump at the Scotch College School Sports in 1888.

=== University sports ===
In 1893 and 1894, whilst attending Melbourne University, he participated in a number of lawn tennis tournaments. He won the high jump championship at the 1897 Melbourne University sports meeting, representing the Arts faculty, with a jump of 5 ft. 5in; was captain of the Ormond rugby team and, also, came second in the 120 yards hurdles championship race.

== Football ==
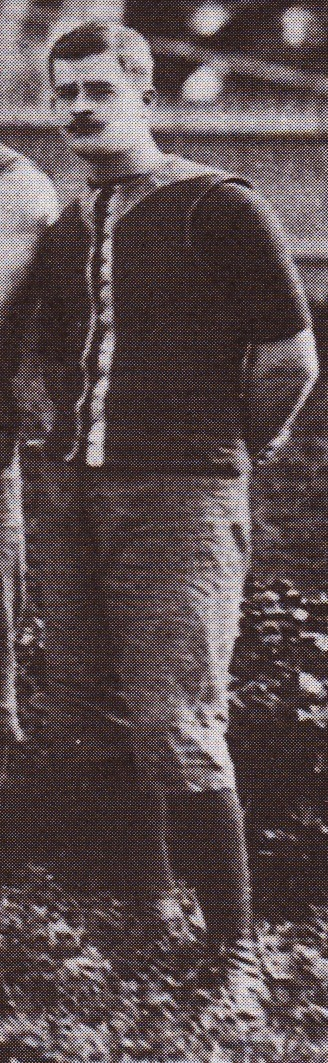
Reid during his football career, 1898

=== VFA footballer (1894–1896) ===
Reid made his debut for Victorian Football Association (VFA) team Fitzroy, as a backman, on Saturday 9 June 1894, at the Richmond Cricket Ground. It was Fitzroy's seventh game for the 1894 season, and Fitzroy won 10 goals 7 behinds to Richmond's 3 goals 11 behinds.

In its match report The Argus commented that "The Fitzroy captain [viz., Tom Banks] was immensely pleased with the high marking of Reid, a former Scotch College boy". In its report, The Age, noting that "it was his first game in the maroons' ranks", and that "he is a decided acquisition to the team", remarked that "Reid, among the backs, played almost perfect football throughout".

He played a number of senior VFA games for Fitzroy between 1894 and 1896, and came to be considered as one of the game's best defenders.

=== VFL footballer (1897–1898) ===
By the start of 1897, when the Fitzroy Football Club left the VFA and took part in the inaugural VFL competition, Reid was already well established as a defender, and had gained a reputation for his strength, his high making and his long kicking.

He played a total of 24 senior Victorian Football League (VFL) games; eight in 1897, and sixteen in 1898.

In his first VFL match, at the Brunswick Street Oval, on Saturday 29 May 1897, Reid played an outstanding defensive game – "Reid was playing a sure and fast game"; "Reid marked beautifully and invariably got in a splendid long low kick" – in a team that was unexpectedly very soundly beaten by a very inexperienced Essendon side, 6.6 (42) to 2.8 (20); the three-quarter time score had been 5.5 (35) to 1.3 (9).

=== Representative team (1897) ===
In June 1897, in the first season of the new V.F.L. competition, the Victorian Football League arranged a match between a combined team of V.F.L. players and a combined team from what was, perhaps, the second strongest competition in Australia at that time, the Ballarat Football Association. Whilst the selected team was listed as "Melbourne", and the match spoken of as the Ballarat v. Melbourne match, all of the contemporary newspaper accounts indicate that most people referred to them as "The Metropolitans" (by contrast with the "Country" team from Ballarat). There is no record of the team ever being referred to as either the "Victorian" team or the "V.F.L." team.

The representative match was originally proposed to take place at the Melbourne Cricket Ground on Saturday, 12 June 1897; however, for some trivial reasons, relating to the question of the free admission of V.F.L. delegates to the Members' Reserves, the Melbourne Cricket Club refused to allow the V.F.L. to use its pavilion facilities, and the V.F.L. decided well before the match to transfer the game to the Brunswick Street Oval in North Fitzroy.

Reid was not selected in the original team, which contained players from Melbourne, Essendon, South Melbourne, Fitzroy, Geelong, Carlton and St Kilda. However, for reasons that were never made quite clear, six of the selected twenty players, Firth McCallum and Henry Young from the Geelong Football Club, Bill McCulloch from the Melbourne Football Club, and Jim Anderson, George Vautin and Harry Wright all of the Essendon Football Club failed to turn up for the match.

The match did not start on time, and there was a rush to find last minute replacements. Eventually, Ernie Walton from the Carlton Football Club, Joe O'Grady from the St Kilda Football Club, and Tom Banks, Bill Cleary, Bill McSpeerin, and Stan Reid, all from the Fitzroy Football Club took the field in place of the absentees in the Metropolitan team. Thus, Stan Reid played for the first combined Victorian Football League side that ever played in metropolitan Melbourne – earlier in that same week, a far weaker combined V.F.L. team had travelled to Bendigo, and played a combined team there, winning the match 14.14 (98) to 9.4 (58).

Reid was injured early in the game, was unable to continue, and left the field; which, according to the rules of the day, which allowed for twenty "run on" players for each team with no replacements, left his team one man short (he was, however, fit enough by the following Saturday to play for Fitzroy against South Melbourne). Another of the Metropolitan team, Norm Waugh, from the Essendon Football Club, was very badly concussed during the match; he remained on the field for the whole match, but was of no help to his team-mates at all.

The well trained and highly skilled Ballarat team beat the VFL side, no doubt because the VFL team had not trained together, had the six last minute replacements, played as separate, selfish individuals, and effectively played two men short, by a score of 13.11 (89) to 8.6 (54).

=== VFL Grand Final (1898) ===
His last game for Fitzroy was in the 1898 VFL Grand Final, on Saturday, 24 September 1898, at the Junction Oval, the first ever VFL Grand Final Match.

Selected on the full-back line, he played a strong game and was one of Fitzroy's best players.

Fitzroy Football Team

…Mr. T. Banks then presented on behalf of the
Fitzroy Football Club, Mr. Stanley Reid with a very
useful travelling companion and pair of field glasses.
Mr Banks commented on the good the game
received from gentlemen of the position of Mr. Reid
in playing football.
The club was sorry to lose Mr. Reid, and he was
carrying to West Australia their best wishes for his
future welfare.
Mr. Reid made a very feeling speech in reply,
he stated that he thoroughly loved the game and
although he was donning the clerical robes, he
would still feel an interest in the sport and would
always look for Fitzroy's welfare. (Cheers).
Fitzroy City Press, 20 October 1898.

=== After the VFL ===
Once in Western Australia, he continued to play football; he played for one of the local teams, the Boulder City Rovers.

Although stationed on the West Australian goldfields, Reid kept in touch with his old team. On Monday 1 April 1901, at the annual meeting of the Fitzroy Football Club held at the Fitzroy Town Hall, prizes were awarded to Mick Grace and Ern Jenkins for having been the most "consistent" players in the 1900 season.

The prizes had been donated by the Rev. Stanley S. Reid of Boulder, and the West Australian dental surgeon, Edgar Henry McGillicuddy.

== Presbyterian Church ==
Because Melbourne University was a secular institution in the nineteenth century, it did not offer degrees in Divinity.

Consequently, Reid had to pursue his theological studies at the separate Presbyterian theological college that was situated on the university's campus, Ormond College, graduating at the end of 1898.^{,} Whilst he was at Ormond College he was also captain of the College's football team.

He was ordained as the first minister to the newly formed St. George's Presbyterian Church in the Western Australian gold mining town of Boulder on 15 March 1899, having arrived there in December 1898.

On Monday 5 June 1899, as a mark of the high esteem with which he was already held by the congregation (and the citizens of Boulder in general), the ladies of St George's Presbyterian Church presented Reid with a silk gown. At the same gathering, presided over by the Mayor of Boulder, Mr. John M. Hopkins, Reid was also presented with an illuminated address to mark the auspicious occasion.

== Military service ==
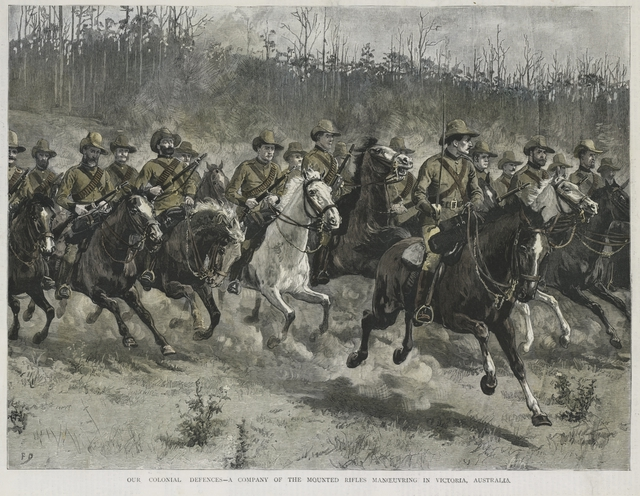
A Company of the Victorian Mounted Rifles on manoeuvres in Victoria in 1889

=== Victorian Mounted Rifles ===
Whilst still in Victoria, Reid had served for 18 months as a member of the self-funded voluntary citizens' military force known as the Victorian Mounted Rifles. The men were required to supply and maintain their own horse, and supply their own uniform, rifle, saddles, harness, and all other equipment. They were trained in various cavalry activities, such as marksmanship and both mounted and dismounted parade drills.

Reid was a highly skilled horseman. More than a year after leaving Victoria and taking up his post at Boulder in Western Australia, he was still able to produce a good performance. He competed in the "Military Sports" division of the four-day carnival arranged to aid the St George's Presbyterian Church in Boulder. Reid competed in the tilting at the ring without success, came second in the tent pegging competition, came third in the umbrella and cigar race, came second in his heat of the rescue race, and won his first bout in the horseback wrestling only to lose his second bout to a much heavier and stronger opponent.

=== Chaplain Reid ===
Soon after the Second Boer War had broken out in October 1899, Reid volunteered to serve as a chaplain to the Second Contingent of the Western Australian Mounted Infantry. His offer to serve as a chaplain was not successful because there were no vacant positions at the time of his application.

=== Trooper Reid ===
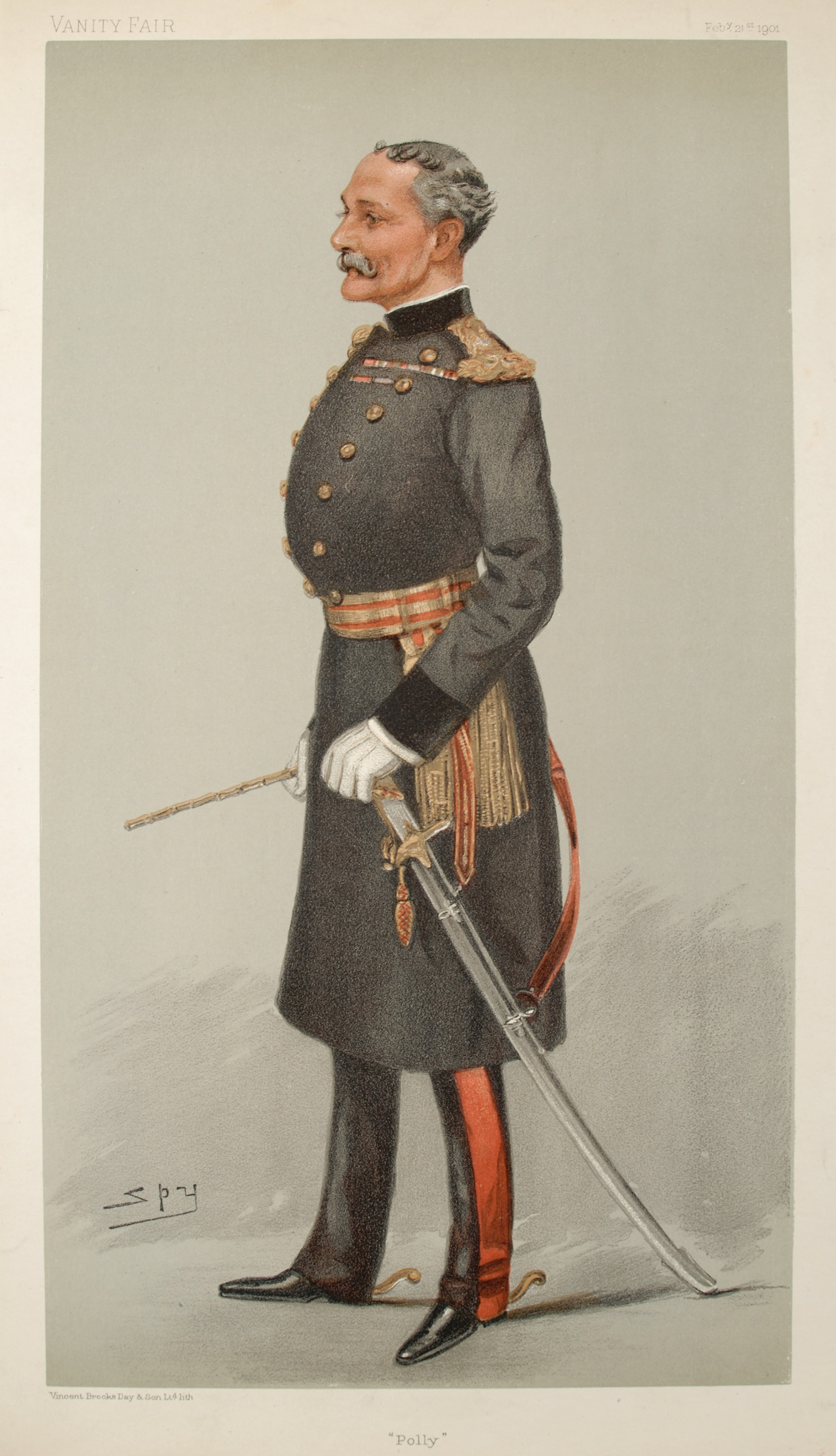
Lieutenant-General Reginald Pole-Carew in 1901

He eventually enlisted as a private in the Second Western Australian (Mounted Infantry) Contingent (2WAMI) which left Australia on 3 February 1900.

On Wednesday, 26 December 1899, Reid was given a special farewell by the town council and residents of Boulder.

In his response to the toasts, he said that whilst "he had got over the youthful glamor of war" he was also totally "prepared to take his part in what was in store for him" in South Africa. He added that he hoped that, if he returned, those present "would be able to say that they had given a farewell to a man who had taken his part for the British Empire". He also stressed that his enlistment had been thought out at some length and was not the consequence of a momentary whim, remarking that "to outsiders… it might seem peculiar for a clergyman to join as a common soldier"; however, in his view, "when the time and opportunity offered… every man should act patriotically as well as talk patriotism", and that "[although] there might be questions as to the beginning of the war" it was clear that, "now that it had started they should all unite to see it through. (Loud applause.)"

BOULDER CLERGYMAN VOLUNTEERS

KALGOORLIE, 27 December

The Rev. Stanley Reid, Presbyterian minister at the Boulder, left this afternoon by the express to join the West Australian contingent for the Transvaal. Last night he was accorded a hearty send-off by friends and church communicants. As the train moved away he was accorded ringing cheers. Mr. Reid, who was in the first flight of Melbourne athletes, has joined the contingent as a private.

He was a popular soldier and he was well respected for his military skills by his fellow troopers.

The contingent (consisting of 6 officers, 97 other ranks, 125 horses, one spring cart, and one wagon) left Australia on the SS Surrey on 3 February 1900. Immediately the West Australian contingent arrived in South Africa it was attached to the 11th Division of the South Africa Field Force, commanded by Lieutenant-General Reginald Pole-Carew. On 25 July 1900, as the division began its advance to Komatipoort on the Komati River, at the frontier between Mozambique and South Africa, Reid became separated from his Division, and was listed as "missing" for twelve days. He rejoined his Division at Middelburg. The Division eventually reached Komatipoort on 24 September.

During this first tour of duty, Reid had seen action in Johannesburg, Diamond Hill, Belfast, Cape Colony, and Orange Free State.

=== Arrest and repatriation to Australia ===
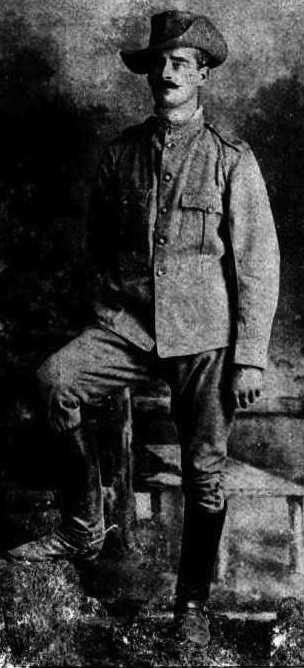
Lieutenant Reid, 1901

During this time Reid had written a letter from Middelburg, dated 22 August 1900, to his mother in Perth.

In his letter he was highly critical of a senior officer. Although he did not name him in the letter to his mother, the officer was later identified as one "Sergeant Robinson", who had been promoted to "Captain Robinson". Consequent upon matters connected with the Bush Veldt Carbineers and "the Handcock-Morant military scandal" Robinson was relieved of his command, and reduced to "Corporal Robinson", thus effectively exonerating Reid, and verifying that his privately expressed views were reliable. The West Australian newspaper obtained the letter from his mother, and noting that "this letter gives an account of his experiences during a very anxious time" (viz., the time that he was missing), published it on 11 October 1900, without seeking Reid's permission to do so.

As soon as the military authorities in South Africa became aware of the letter's publication, Reid was arrested and repatriated to Australia (he reached Fremantle, along with the rest of the Second Western Australian (Mounted Infantry) Contingent, on 8 December 1900).

=== Charges dropped ===
Having returned to Australia under arrest, Reid had the reasonable expectation that he would be court-martialled. However, no official investigation of any kind was ever made into the circumstances of the publication of the letter; and, for some undisclosed reason, his case was unexpectedly dropped altogether.

In the absence of any "official" explanation, is reasonable to suppose that one or more of several possible influences may have played a part in the decision of the authorities not to proceed against Reid:

- His father and himself were ordained ministers of the Presbyterian Church (and, apparently, held in high regard).
- Despite still being part of the "Imperial Forces" when he returned to Australia on 8 December 1900 (effectively as a member of the military forces of the Colony of Western Australia), he was released after the Australian Commonwealth Government (in Commonwealth Gazette No. 9 of 20 February 1901) had authorized the formation of the Commonwealth Military Forces, effective from 1 March 1901.
- The Sixth Western Australian (Mounted Infantry) Contingent, being composed of just 14 officers, 214 men, and 237 horses, were greatly in need of the experience and leadership of a man who had already displayed great military talent in the South African conditions.
- His younger brother was also in the contingent.

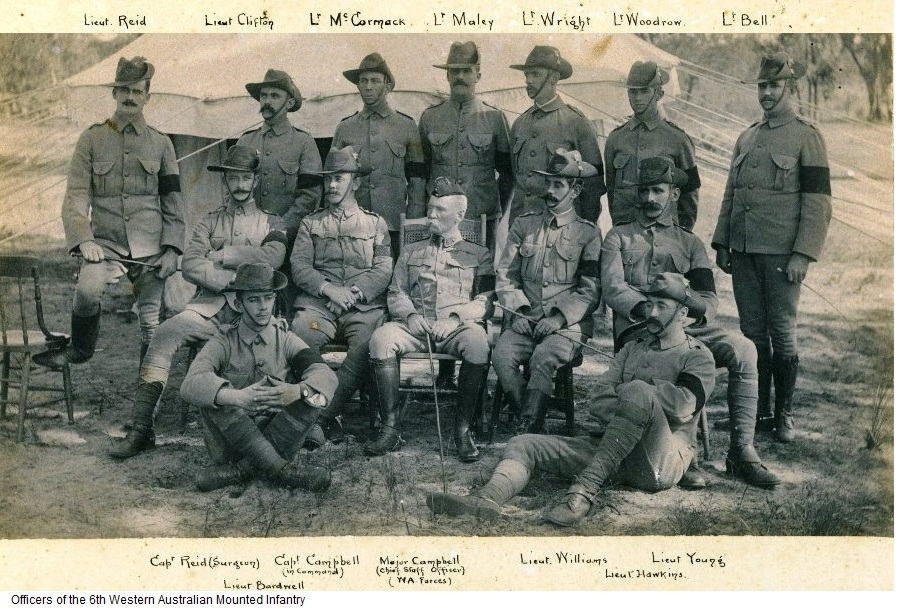
Officers of the 6th Western Australia Mounted Infantry, 1901. Reid is standing at the far left of the back row; his brother, Surgeon-Captain Francis Bentley Reid, in on the far left of the seated row, and another Caulfield Grammarian, Lieutenant Bernard Everett Bardwell is sitting cross-legged at the far left of the front row.

=== Lieutenant Reid ===
Having been released from custody, and having been selected as one of the 25 returned soldiers to represent the State of Western Australia at the celebrations held in Sydney to celebrate the Federation of Australia on 1 January 1901, Reid was promoted to Lieutenant on 7 March 1901, and he joined the Sixth Western Australian (Mounted Infantry) Contingent in camp at Karrakatta.^{,}

His younger brother, Surgeon-Captain Francis Bentley Reid, was medical officer to the same unit.

The entire contingent left Western Australia on 10 April 1901 on the S.S. Ulstermore. Reid made a speech at the quayside and a presentation of a purse of sovereigns to the W.C.T.U. on behalf of the members of the contingent who had received their support at Karrakatta. The contingent arrived in South Africa on 29 April 1901.

Reid's unit saw action in Eastern Transvaal; and, on 16 May 1901, Reid was badly wounded in the stomach in a heavy fire fight at a farm near Brakpan. Reid was taken to a field hospital 39 miles from Carolina. Both Reid and his brother were mentioned in despatches for their bravery at this time:

Lieutenant S S Reid at [Brakapan]… remained with his men though severely wounded early in the fight…
Surgeon-Captain F B Reid showed absolute disregard of danger in performing his duties on the same occasion".

Reid recovered from his stomach wound and returned to action with his unit. In 1902, Mr. Collick, a military chaplain, reported that when he had gone up to the wounded Reid (Collick had been riding in company with Dr. Francis Reid) and told him that he would call an ambulance, pointing to the two wounded men by his side, Reid had responded "Don't mind me; see to these fellows". Collick also remarked that, he was one of the bravest officers in South Africa; and that, although "Reid's wound was serious enough to get him three months' leave of absence", he insisted on returning to action immediately he had recovered sufficiently and leading his men.

== Death ==
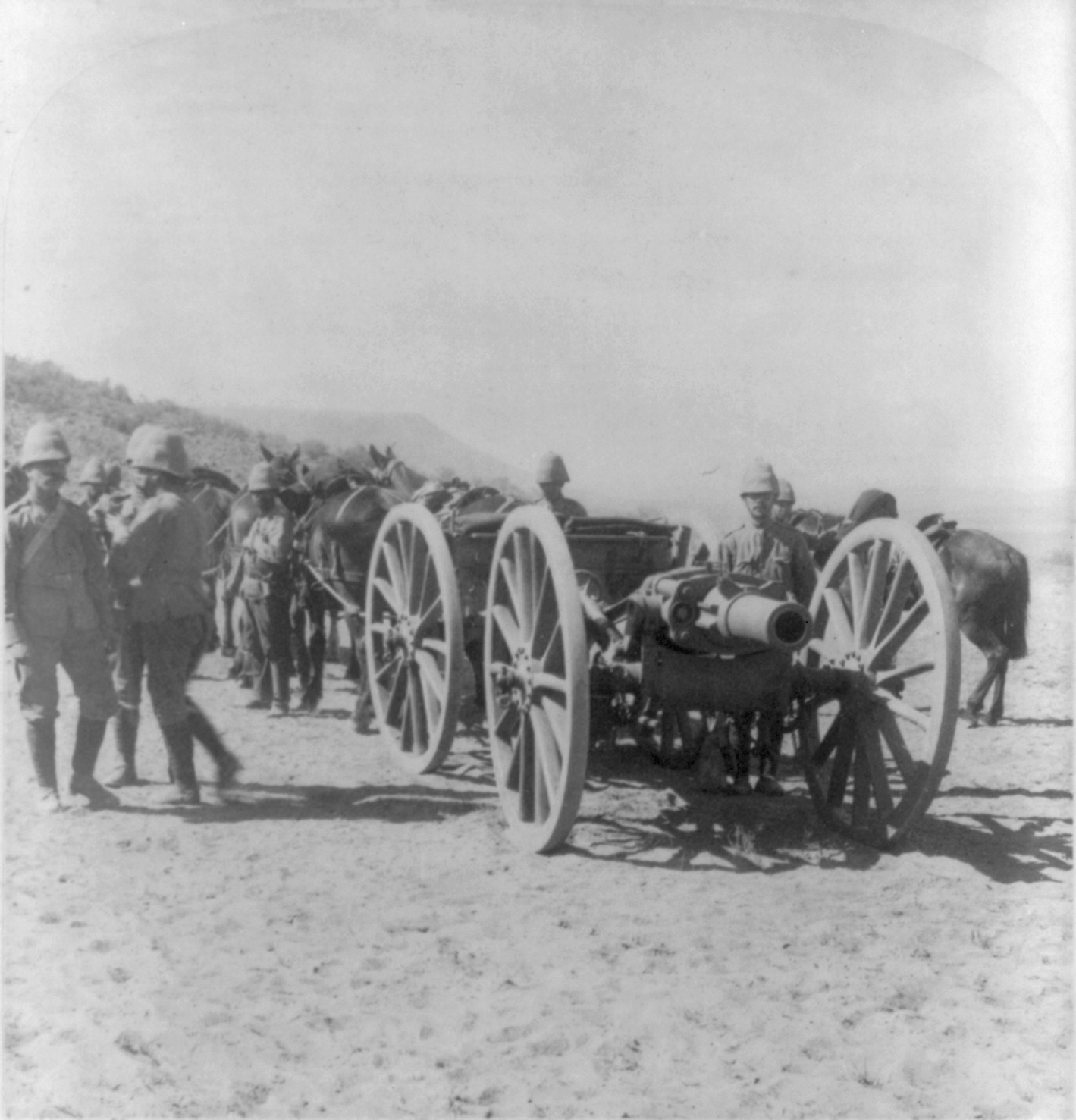
A British Army Field Artillery's 5-inch Howitzer, in Cape Colony, South Africa, January 1900

On 23 June 1901, during a reconnaissance at Renshoogte Farm, near Ermelo, Reid was once again shot in the stomach. His brother placed Reid and the other wounded in an ambulance cart and set off back to their camp.

In a letter to their parents, written after Reid's death, his brother described his wounding:

[On 23 June], as soon as it was light enough to march, the Fifth and Sixth W.A.M.I. and Imperial Light Horse, with two Colt guns, left camp to reconnoitre the surrounding country, as the Boer snipers had been giving a lot of annoyance on the previous day. On a kopje about three miles from camp we lodged the guns in a position in which they had command on all sides within a range of about 3,000 yards. From the kopje we advanced, the Fifth on the left and the Sixth in the centre, and on the right we advanced two and a half miles from the guns to some kaffir kraals, where we halted, while Stanley was further ahead with his troops in skirmishing order to see what was over the sky-line which was about three miles away from us. They advanced slowly, and when they were near the sky-line we heard heavy firing going on. Stanley and his troops disappeared from view behind a ridge, and the rifle firing became very heavy and continuous in their direction. Then we saw about twenty mounted men appear from the ridge over which his troops had disappeared from view. We took them to be our men returning until they came within 300 yards or so. Then we discovered they were Boers chasing two of Stanley's men. We opened fire on them and drove them back. Then these two men told us that of Stanley's troops' two men were killed and three wounded, the rest being taken prisoners. In the meantime the 5in. gun had been sent for and taken into position alongside the Colt guns. These now commenced firing on the enemy for a while at a range of about five miles. After they finished my orderly and myself rode across with the Red Cross flag, to the scene of the troops' engagement. There we found two dead and three wounded – Stanley through the stomach, his sergeant in three places, through the neck, through the leg, and through his lungs; and a private through the chest. We at once dressed Stanley's wounds, and made him as comfortable as it was possible, the men of ours doing all they could to make him comfortable, taking off half their own clothes to make a bed for him and to cover him. In about an hour and a half the ambulance waggon came, and we took them all back to camp. Major Jones, who is in charge of the hospital, has done everything to make him comfortable.

Three days later, on the morning of 29 June 1901, Reid died of his wounds at Middel-Kraal: his brother described the circumstances in his letter to their parents:

Stanley died [on the morning of 29 June] at 5 o'clock. Since he was wounded I have been near him all the time, and was with him when he passed away. I had all the surgeons in the camp. but they all agreed it was hopeless. He was in considerable pain, but stood it as I have seldom seen a man stand it. The men of the contingent fairly worshipped him; and are very cut up over his death. Poor Stanley's grave is the best I have seen in South Africa. The men asked leave from the captain to look after the grave. Leave was granted, and they worked away at it and made it up splendidly.

He was buried in a grave especially arranged by the men he had commanded – situated beneath a clump of Australian wattles, with a large wooden cross bearing his name at its head – with full military honours in a ceremony, attended by his commanding officer Colonel Campbell and his staff, representatives of all of the regiments comprising the Sixth W.A.M.I., conducted by regimental chaplain and Reid's old friend, Mr. Collick.

A fellow officer, Lieutenant Bernard Bardwell, reported that "His brother, the doctor, was almost mad with grief. It will take a strong hand to pull him together again, as he is utterly broken down, poor fellow."

In 1902, Mr. Collick praised Reid, stating that "though Stanley Reid went to South Africa as a soldier he lived up to the high standard of life that he would have had to live as a minister, and in every way he set a good example to his men.

Reid, the second VFL player known to have died in active service, is buried at the Middelburg Cemetery, Mpumalanga.

At probate, in April 1902, his estate was worth £200.

== Remembered ==
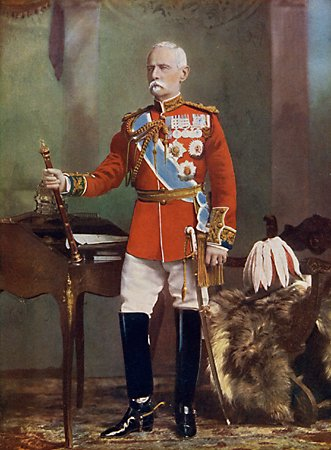
Field Marshal Frederick Sleigh Roberts, 1st Earl Roberts of Kandahar, VC, KG, KP, GCB, OM, GCSI, GCIE, PC, in 1900)

The West Australian of 21 May 1901, noting that Reid "was for some time the minister of the Presbyterian Church at Boulder", reported that "he was regarded as a fine soldier, and one who had a more than ordinary moral influence over his comrades in the field".

In its 20 July 1901 tribute to Reid, The Western Mail, having made reference to his academic and clerical careers, reported that Field Marshal Lord Roberts, the Commander in Chief of the British Forces in Second Boer War, had said of Reid: "He is one of the best men on the field of battle".

At the same time the newspaper observed that "his death has caused sorrow in many a home", and reported that a memorial service had been held in Boulder on Sunday 14 July 1901 for the town's former Presbyterian minister and that "many Roman Catholics and people of other denominations [had] attended to show their respect to the memory of one who had proved himself a man among men". The Kalgoorlie Western Argus also published an obituary.

After his death his commanding Officer wrote to his mother:

Both officers and men under my command feel acutely the loss of your gallant son who by his kindliness and manly bearing had endeared himself to everybody with whom he was associated.
His conduct in the field was most exemplary.
During our engagement at Breakpan [sic] he was severely wounded in the stomach, but not withstanding the severity of his wound he continued in action, and led his division until the close of the action.
For his conspicuous bravery I mentioned him in despatches, and to the general commanding this column was pleased to forward it on to the commander in chief.

In a match against Trinity College on Tuesday, 9 July 1901, not long after the news of Reid's death had reached Melbourne, the Ormond College football team all wore black arm-bands as a mark of respect for their former captain.

Reid was specifically mentioned in the address given by Sir James George Steere, the chairman of the W.A. Fallen Soldiers' Memorial Committee, on Friday 26 July 1901 in Kings Park, when Steere formally invited the Duke of York (later King George V) to lay the foundation stone for the monument that was to serve as a memorial to the 4 officers and 24 men (of the more than 900 that went to South Africa in six different contingents from Western Australia) who were killed in action or died of their wounds in the Boer War.

Stanley Spencer Reid is commemorated on war memorials at:

- Australian War Memorial, Canberra
- Caulfield Grammar School, St Kilda East, Victoria
- King's Park, Perth
- Ormond College, Parkville, Victoria
- Scotch College, Hawthorn, Victoria
- Middelburg Cemetery, Mpumalanga, South Africa.

== Private papers ==
Reid's personal diary and a collection of letters that were written by Reid whilst on active service in South Africa are held by the Australian War Memorial in Canberra.

== See also ==
- List of Victorian Football League players who died on active service
- 1898 VFL Grand Final
- List of Caulfield Grammar School people
