= Kelly Robinson =

Australian rules footballer

Personal information
- Full name: James Peter Robinson
- Born: 1876; Tooborac, Victoria
- Died: 26 November 1943 (aged 67); Heidelberg, Victoria
- Original team: Collingwood Imperials
- Position: Wingman

Playing career^{1}
Years	Club	Games (Goals)
1897–1901	Fitzroy	57 (1)
- ^{1} Playing statistics correct to the end of 1901.

Career highlights
- 2× VFL premiership player: 1898, 1899

James Peter "Kelly" Robinson (1876 – 26 November 1943) was an Australian rules footballer who played for the Fitzroy Football Club in the Victorian Football League (VFL).

== Family ==
The son of George Robinson, and Mary Robinson, née Higgins, James Peter Robinson was born at Tooborac, Victoria in 1876.

He married Teresa Florence Skinner (1881–1956) in 1907.

== Football ==
Robinson was recruited to Fitzroy from the Collingwood Imperials. He was a wingman in Fitzroy's 1898 and 1899 premierships and also played in their losing 1900 Grand Final team.

At one stage in his career he played in 19 consecutive wins. Robinson kicked just one goal in his career, against Collingwood, in the opening game of the 1900 season.

== Death ==
He died at the Austin Hospital, in Heidelberg, Melbourne on 26 November 1943.

== See also ==
- The Footballers' Alphabet
- 1898 VFL Grand Final
- 1899 VFL Grand Final
- 1900 VFL Grand Final
