= Johnny Power =

Australian rules footballer

Personal information
- Full name: John Power
- Born: 10 April 1874; Bendigo, Victoria
- Died: 16 May 1958 (aged 84); Prahran, Victoria
- Height: 175 cm (5 ft 9 in)
- Weight: 78 kg (172 lb)

Playing career^{1}
Years	Club	Games (Goals)
1898–1899	Fitzroy	10 (0)
- ^{1} Playing statistics correct to the end of 1899.

Career highlights
- VFL premiership player: 1898

Johnny Power (10 April 1874 – 16 May 1958) was an Australian rules footballer who played for the Fitzroy Football Club in the Victorian Football League (VFL).

Although Power only made 10 senior appearances for Fitzroy, he was a premiership player. In his seventh game he played as a full-back in their 1898 premiership team.
