= Jerry Nolan (footballer) =

Australian rules footballer (1869–1947)

Personal information
- Full name: Jeremiah Lucius Nolan
- Born: 20 November 1869; Williamstown, Victoria
- Died: 4 April 1947 (aged 77); South Yarra, Victoria
- Position: Defender

Playing career^{1}
Years	Club	Games (Goals)
1897–1899	Fitzroy	34 (1)
- ^{1} Playing statistics correct to the end of 1899.

Career highlights
- VFL premiership player: 1898

Jeremiah Lucius Nolan (20 November 1869 – 4 April 1947) was an Australian rules footballer who played for the Fitzroy Football Club in the Victorian Football League (VFL).

Nolan was a premiership player with Fitzroy in 1898 and played as a back pocket in the Grand Final that season. He kicked just one goal in his career, against Carlton at Brunswick Street Oval in 1898. His last game came early in the 1899 season, despite having played in 13 successive wins.

Nolan (also known as Lou Nolan) worked as a water supply engineer with the Melbourne & Metropolitan Board of Works where he worked for 43 years, retiring on 28 November 1934.
