= Conrad ten Brink =

Australian rules footballer

Personal information
- Full name: Conrad Caesar ten Brink
- Born: 31 January 1875; Smythesdale, Victoria
- Died: 3 March 1938 (aged 63); Benalla, Victoria
- Original team: Albury
- Height: 180 cm (5 ft 11 in)
- Weight: 82 kg (181 lb)
- Position: Follower

Playing career^{1}
Years	Club	Games (Goals)
1898	Essendon	12 (10)
- ^{1} Playing statistics correct to the end of 1898.

Conrad Caesar ten Brink (31 January 1875 – 3 March 1938) was an Australian rules footballer who played with Essendon in the Victorian Football League (VFL).

== Early life ==
Ten Brink was born in the Courthouse Hotel in Smythesdale, Victoria on 31 January 1875. His father, Conrad ten Brink Sr, was a German immigrant from Schleswig-Holstein, who came to Australia as a child in 1854.

Conrad Ted Brink Sr promoted Sheffield Handicap running races into Victoria when he was based at Smythesdale, near Ballarat.

The family moved to Albury, New South Wales when Ten Brink was young and his father twice served as the town's mayor, in 1898 and 1906.

The Ten Brink family operated the Globe Hotel, Albury.

== Football career ==
A follower, Ten Brink developed a high reputation during his time with the Albury Football Club and joined Essendon in 1898. He played 12 games and kicked 10 goals for Essendon, all in the 1898 VFL season. His final appearance came in the 1898 VFL Grand Final, which he started as a forward, but was unable to register a goal in a 15-point loss.

He returned to play with Albury FC in the Ovens and Murray Football League in 1899 and was still playing with Albury in 1903.

== Later years ==
At the time of his death in 1938, Ten Brink was based in Brisbane.
