= Bill Potter =

Australian rules footballer

Personal information
- Full name: William Potter
- Born: 8 February 1872; Lucknow, Victoria
- Died: 26 September 1970 (aged 98); Prahran, Victoria
- Position: Follower

Playing career^{1}
Years	Club	Games (Goals)
1898–1902	Fitzroy	60 (8)
- ^{1} Playing statistics correct to the end of 1902.

Career highlights
- 2× VFL premiership player: 1898, 1899

William Potter (8 February 1872 – 26 September 1970) was an Australian rules footballer who played for the Fitzroy Football Club in the Victorian Football League (VFL).

== Family ==
The son of David Potter, and Joanna Potter, née Fyffe, William Potter was born at Lucknow, Victoria on 8 February 1872.

== Football ==
Potter, a follower, made his debut in 1898. He played in each of the first three VFL Grand Finals: in the 1898 premiership team, the 1899 premiership team, and the losing 1900 Grand Final team.
