= Alf Gray (Australian footballer) =

Australian rules footballer

Personal information
- Full name: Alured Blanchard Gray
- Born: 20 November 1874; Melbourne
- Died: 2 September 1931 (aged 56); Hawthorn, Victoria
- Original team: Collegians

Playing career^{1}
Years	Club	Games (Goals)
1898, 1902	Essendon	5 (0)
- ^{1} Playing statistics correct to the end of 1902.

Alured Blanchard Gray (20 November 1874 – 2 September 1931) was an Australian rules footballer who played for the Essendon Football Club in the Victorian Football League (VFL).
