= Jim Grace =

Australian rules footballer

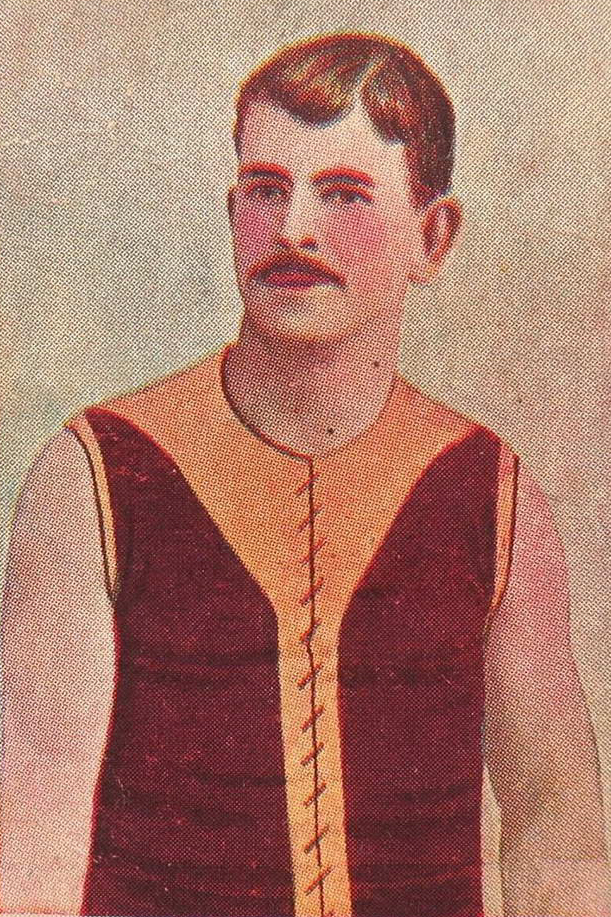
- Cigarette card of Grace in 1905

Personal information
- Full name: James Grace
- Born: 21 September 1868; Burnley, Victoria
- Died: 31 December 1938 (aged 70); Royal Park, Melbourne
- Debut: Round 5, 1890, Fitzroy vs. Geelong
- Height: 182 cm (6 ft 0 in)
- Weight: 78 kg (172 lb)

Playing career^{1}
Years	Club	Games (Goals)
1890–1896	Fitzroy (VFA)	131 (248)
1897–1899	Fitzroy (VFL)	47 (33)
Total		178 (281)
- ^{1} Playing statistics correct to the end of 1899.

Career highlights
- VFA premiership player: 1895; 2× VFL premiership player: 1898, 1899; VFA leading goalkicker: 1890, 1891; Fitzroy leading goalkicker: 1890, 1891, 1892, 1893, 1894, 1895, 1896

Jim Grace (21 September 1868 – 31 December 1938) was an Australian rules footballer who played for the Fitzroy Football Club in the club's early years. His younger brother, Mick Grace, played beside him at Fitzroy.

== Football ==
Grace joined Fitzroy in the Victorian Football Association (VFA) in 1890. He played as a full-forward and dominated Fitzroy's goalkicking during his time at the club, winning the club's leading goalkicker award every year from his debut through until 1896. He was also the league's leading goalkicker in his first two seasons, 1890 and 1891. Grace was part of Fitzroy's 1895 premiership team, the same season that his younger brother Mick joined him at the Maroons.

After Fitzroy broke away from the VFA to join the new Victorian Football League (VFL) competition, Grace spent a further three seasons at Fitzroy, playing in Fitzroy's 1898 and 1899 premierships. By this stage of his career, he played often as a ruckman and follower, spending less time at full-forward than he had earlier in his career.

He retired at the end of 1899, with his career tally of 281 goals standing as a club record until Round 3 of 1918, when it was broken by Jim Freake.
