= Mick Grace =

Australian rules footballer (1874–1912)

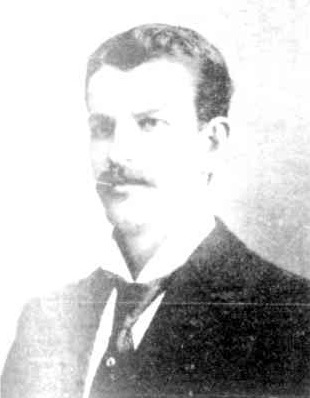
- Grace in 1899

Personal information
- Full name: Michael John Grace
- Born: 24 July 1874; Burnley, Victoria
- Died: 21 May 1912 (aged 37); Heidelberg, Victoria
- Height: 180 cm (5 ft 11 in)
- Weight: 78 kg (172 lb)

Playing career
Years	Club	Games (Goals)
1895–1896	Fitzroy (VFA)	35 (19)
1897–1900	Fitzroy	65 (55)
1903–1907	Carlton	86 (133)
1908	St Kilda	16 (26)
Total		202 (233)

Coaching career
Years	Club	Games (W–L–D)
1908	St Kilda	19 (10–9–0)
1910	University	18 (10–8–0)

Career highlights
- 4× VFL premiership player: 1898, 1899, 1906, 1907; VFA premiership: 1895; VFL leading goalkicker: 1906; Fitzroy Club Champion: 1898; 2× Carlton leading goalkicker: 1904, 1906

Michael John Grace (24 July 1874 – 21 May 1912) was an Australian rules footballer who played for the Fitzroy Football Club, Carlton Football Club and St Kilda Football Club in the Victorian Football League (VFL).

== Family ==
The son of Thomas Grace, and Julia Grace, née O'Callaghan, Michael John Grace was born in Burnley, Victoria on 24 July 1874. He was the brother of Fitzroy footballers Jim Grace and Joe Grace.

He married Martha Drew in 1903.

== Football ==
Mick Grace was a follower/forward who started his career at the top level in the VFA in 1895 with Fitzroy, joining his older brother Jim. Grace was part of Fitzroy's premiership team in that season (although no Grand Final was played in the VFA at the time). In 1897, Fitzroy was one of the eight clubs to form the VFL as a breakaway competition from the VFA, and in 1898 and 1899, Grace was part of back-to-back VFL premierships with the Maroons. He was regarded as the best player on the ground in the 1898 Grand Final. Grace was part of the Maroons' 1900 losing premiership side, then retired from playing.

In 1903, influential coach Jack Worrall persuaded Grace to return to the VFL for Carlton. Grace played for Carlton between 1903 and 1907. He won a further two VFL premierships with Carlton (in 1906 and 1907), and in 1906 he kicked 50 goals in a single season, the first VFL player ever to do so.

Grace retired from the VFL again halfway through the 1907 season, and was set to play for Brighton in the VFA for the remainder of the season, before Worrall convinced him to return to Carlton for the successful finals campaign.

Grace left Carlton again at the end of the 1907 season, and moved to St Kilda where he played 16 games in 1908.

Altogether throughout his career in Victoria, Grace won five premierships (three with Fitzroy, and two with Carlton). Grace also played four state games for Victoria.

== Coach ==
Grace had a brief coaching career, serving as St Kilda's coach in 1908 while playing and as coach of university in 1910, and later coaching in Sydney.

== Cricket ==
Grace was also a leading junior cricketer, representing the Combined Victorian Juniors against the Marylebone Cricket Club (MCC) side during MCCs 1903/04 tour.

== Death ==
He had been suffering from tuberculosis for some time. He died of tuberculosis, at Heidelberg, on 21 May 1912.
