= Roy McDougall =

Australian rules footballer

Personal information
- Full name: Albert Roy McDougall
- Born: 2 July 1907; Port Melbourne, Victoria
- Died: 15 November 1993 (aged 86)
- Height: 177 cm (5 ft 10 in)
- Weight: 74 kg (163 lb)

Playing career^{1}
Years	Club	Games (Goals)
1930–1932	Fitzroy	8 (0)
- ^{1} Playing statistics correct to the end of 1932.

Albert Roy McDougall (2 July 1907 – 15 November 1993) was an Australian rules footballer who played with Fitzroy in the Victorian Football League (VFL).
