= Brush cherry =

Brush cherry is a common name for several plants and may refer to:

- Syzygium australe, native to eastern Australia
- Syzygium paniculatum, native to New South Wales
