= Clement Hodgkinson =

English naturalist, explorer and surveyor

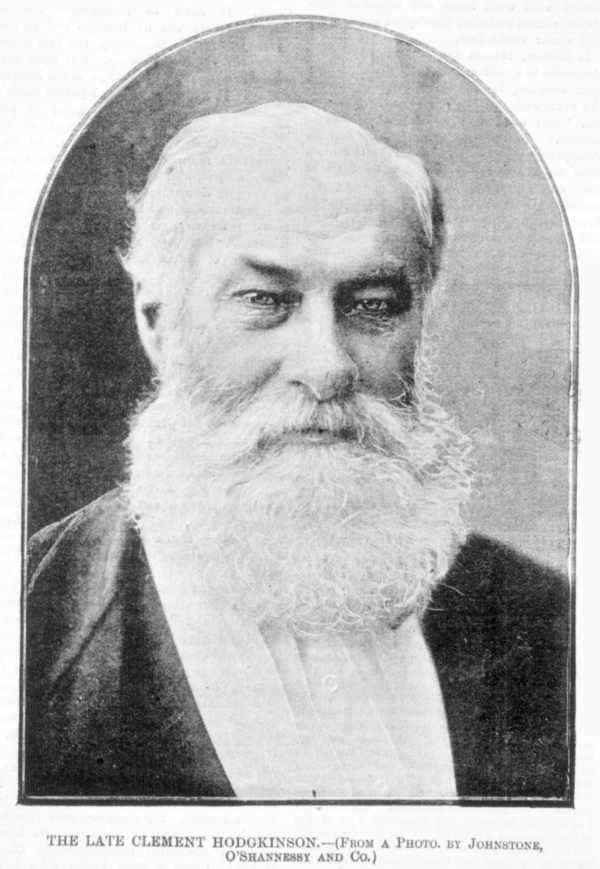

Clement Hodgkinson (1818 – 5 September 1893) was an English naturalist, explorer and surveyor of Australia. He was Victorian Assistant Commissioner of Crown Lands and Survey from 1861 to 1874.

== Exploration in New South Wales ==
Qualified as a civil engineer, Hodgkinson left England in 1839 intending to become a pastoralist. After his arrival, he bought into a cattle station near Kempsey on the Mid North Coast of New South Wales. A year later, the Government of New South Wales hired Hodgkinson to survey and explore the northeastern areas of New South Wales as far as Moreton Bay. In March 1841 he explored the upper reaches of the Nambucca and Bellinger rivers. He then followed the Macleay, Clarence, Hastings, Richmond and Tweed river valleys, visiting Port Macquarie, Brisbane and Moreton Bay. After returning to England, he published an account of his explorations, Australia, from Port Macquarie to Moreton Bay, in 1845. In it he included observations about the Aboriginal tribal life he had witnessed and the natural history of the areas he had explored.

== Landscape design of Melbourne's gardens ==
In the 1850s he again journeyed from England to the young colony of Victoria. In 1854 his wife, Amelia Diana Hunt, gave birth to a son. A year later his first wife had died at the age of 26. In 1857 he married Anne Smart and they subsequently had several children.

In 1852, Hodgkinson joined the Survey Office as a draftsman and was appointed as District Surveyor for Victoria in 1855. As part of his surveying duties, the township of Warrandyte was laid out in 1856. In 1857-1858 he was the Surveyor General of Victoria.

St Vincent Gardens in Albert Park, now a nationally significant park, is an example of nineteenth century residential development around a landscaped square which Hodgkinson initially designed in 1857 and developed in 1864-1870.

In 1860 responsibility for the government reserves was exercised by Clement Hodgkinson, the new administrative head of the Lands Department, who took a detailed interest in the planning and development of the city parks, including Fitzroy Gardens. This started an extensive period of landscape design of Melbourne's parks and gardens including:

- Prepared a plan in 1862 for the Flagstaff Gardens.
- Designed and oversaw the development of the Fitzroy Gardens.
- Queen Victoria provided the grant of land in 1865 for the Edinburgh Gardens, in Fitzroy North, which were subsequently laid out by Clement Hodgkinson
- Designed the Treasury Gardens in 1867 as a pattern of diagonally crossing paths lined with trees, to emulate the Union Jack. Willow trees were planted around an ornamental pond.
- Awarded the task of designing the St Kilda recreational reserve, known today as Alma Park in 1867.
- Made minor changes to Edward La Trobe Bateman's design of the Carlton Gardens after the colonial government resumed control of the site from the Melbourne City Council. Soon afterwards, the gardens were drastically redesigned for the 1880 Melbourne International Exhibition by the Melbourne architect Joseph Reed and horticulturalist William Sangster. Areas cleared by demolition of temporary buildings from the Exhibitions (including the 1888 Centennial Exhibition), were designed by Hodgkinson, his bailiff Nicholas Bickford, and the later City of Melbourne curator of parks and gardens John Guilfoyle. The Carlton Gardens are now a listed World Heritage Site.
- Other notable parks include Princes Park in Maryborough, which was a combined effort by a trio of important landscape designers in Victoria, Clement Hodgkinson, William Guilfoyle and Hugh Linaker.

In 1873, Hodgkinson accepted the position of Inspector General of Metropolitan Parks and Reserves and a year later he retired. During his retirement he landscaped the Melbourne General Cemetery and in March 1882, joined the Melbourne Public Parks and Gardens Committee.

=== Managing Victoria's forests ===
During Hodgkinson's final years as Victorian Assistant-Commissioner of Crown Lands and Survey he established a programme of reservation, regulation, administration and education to control the use of Victoria's forests. The Central Forest Board was established to oversee the entire system on 6 March 1874, with Hodgkinson on the board. On 11 March 1874 Clement Hodgkinson retired from public service. In 1883 he briefly came out of retirement to sit on a new Committee of Management to inspect the City Gardens he had contributed to the creation of.

=== Royal Society of Victoria ===
Hodgkinson was involved in what would become the Royal Society of Victoria, which discussed and advised the colonial government on scientific issues. One of his papers discussed at the Philosophical Institute held at the Museum of Natural History was titled On the favourable geological and chemical nature of the principal rocks and soils of Victoria, in reference to the production of ordinary cereals and wine. Other papers presented included on Hydrometry, and the Geology of the Upper Murray area. Historian Georgina Whitehead has argued that his most notable contribution as a member was to argue, along with Secretary for Mines, Robert Brough Smyth, the need to use Australian rather than European calculations of evaporation and precipitation to site Melbourne’s first reservoir, leading the government to choose Yan Yean.

Hodgkinson was Vice-President of the Philosophical Institute of Victoria in 1856 and again in 1858, and Council Member of the Royal Society of Victoria in 1859-1860.

Hodgkinson was a member of the Royal Society's Exploration Committee which organised the Burke and Wills expedition.

== Works ==
- Hodgkinson, Clement (1845), Australia, from Port Macquarie to Moreton Bay: with descriptions of the natives, their manners and customs; the geology, natural productions, fertility and resources of that region (1st ed.), London: T. and W. Boone, Wikidata Q19053460

== Tributes ==
Hodgkinsonia ovatiflora, commonly referred to as Hodgkinsonia or Golden ash was named after Clement Hodgkinson. The species is found from the Hastings River, NSW to Mackay, Queensland. It grows in Subtropical, dry and littoral rainforest, and also open forest.

In 1858, John Hardy named Olinda creek after Alice Olinda Hodgkinson, the daughter of Clement Hodgkinson. Subsequently the suburb of Olinda was named after the creek.

Preceded by George Christian Darbyshire	Surveyor General of Victoria; 1857–1858	Succeeded by Charles Whybrow Ligar
